= Clásico Joven =

Name for América and Cruz Azul rivalry

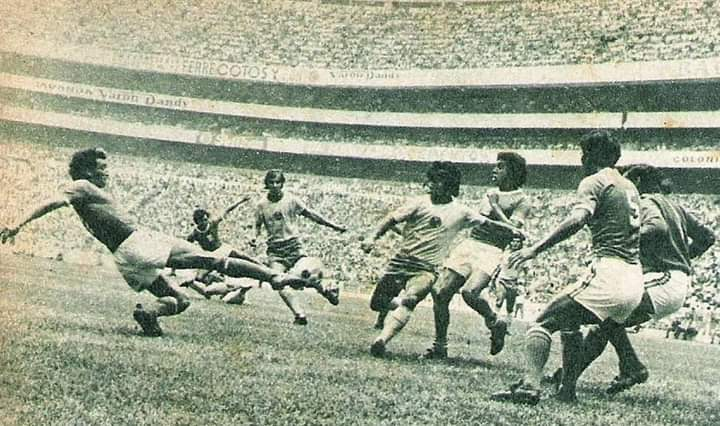
- América and Cruz Azul in the 1971–72 Primera División season
- Location: Mexico City
- Teams: América; Cruz Azul
- First meeting: 23 June 1963; Friendly; Cruz Azul 0–4 América
- Latest meeting: 1 October 2026; Friendly; América 0–0 Cruz Azul
- Stadiums: Estadio Azteca

Statistics
- Total meetings: 207
- Most wins: América (74)
- Most player appearances: Luís Roberto Alves (38, América)
- Top scorer: Carlos Hermosillo (15, 7 with América and 8 with Cruz Azul)
- All-time series: América: 74; Drawn: 70; Cruz Azul: 63
- Largest victory: América 7–0 Cruz Azul; Liga MX Apertura (20 August 2022)
- Largest goal scoring: América 5–3 Cruz Azul; Primera División (8 December 1966)
- Longest win streak: 7 games América (2004–2006)
- Longest unbeaten streak: 16 games América (2003–2010)
- Current unbeaten streak: 4 games Cruz Azul (2025–present)

The Clásico Joven (Spanish for: The Young Classic) is an association football rivalry between Mexico City-based teams América and Cruz Azul. The first match between both teams took place on 23 June 1963, a friendly match where América defeated Cruz Azul 4–0, with Francisco Valdés scoring the first goal in the history of the rivalry. With Cruz Azul having been promoted to the top flight, the first official match between them was played on 30 August 1964 in the Primera División at the Estadio 10 de Diciembre. América won this match 2–1, with an own goal by Francisco Ulibarri and a goal by Alfonso Portugal, while Hilario Díaz scored for Cruz Azul. The first victory for Cruz Azul in the rivalry occurred in the 1967–68 season, when they defeated América 1–0 with a goal by Raúl Arellano. However, the rivalry gained significant intensity and its iconic status on 9 August 1972, during the final of the 1971–72 season, in which Cruz Azul secured a 4–1 victory over América.

== History of the Rivalry ==
=== Early years and the origin of the "Clásico" (1963–72) ===
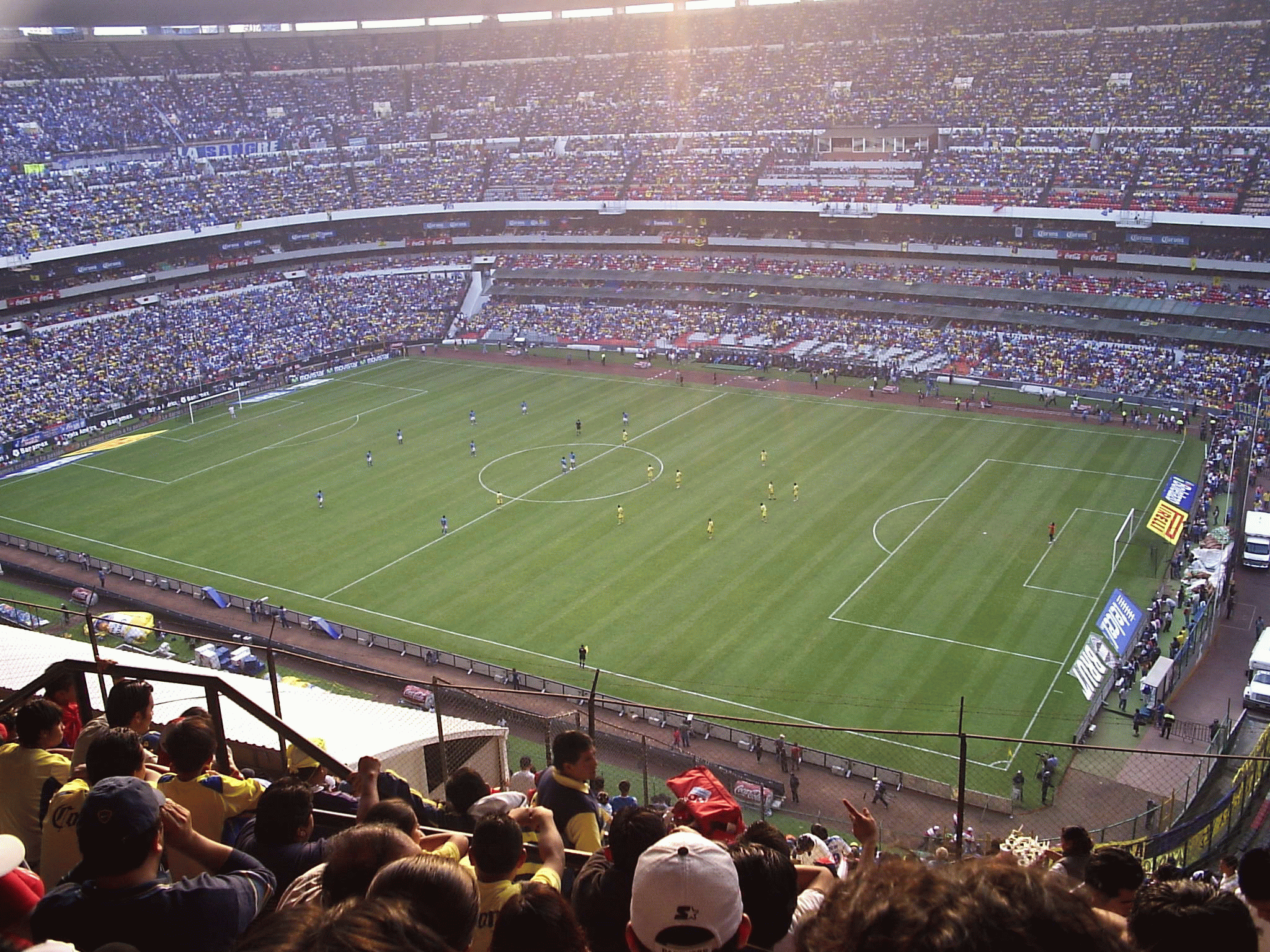
A Clásico Joven match between América and Cruz Azul at Estadio Azteca in 2005.

The rivalry between América and Cruz Azul began prior to the match that officially gave rise to the term "Clásico Joven." The two teams first met on 23 June 1963, in a friendly match that América won decisively by a score of 4–0. Francisco Valdés scored the first goal in the history of the rivalry in the 32nd minute. In the following season, Cruz Azul earned promotion to Mexico's top division by winning the 1963–64 Mexican Segunda División. This promotion set the stage for their first official encounter, where América again emerged victorious, defeating Cruz Azul 2–1. It took 12 matches for Cruz Azul to secure their first win against América, which came on matchday 26 of the 1967–68 season with a goal by Raúl Arellano.

The rivalry intensified in the 1971–72 season when the two teams faced off in a match that decided the league champion. Cruz Azul defeated América 4–1 in a decisive victory, denying América a consecutive championship. This match, regarded as the catalyst for the rivalry, followed América's elimination by Cruz Azul in the quarterfinals of the Copa México during the previous season. The league final was played as a single-leg match, as stipulated by tournament regulations at the time. In the final, Héctor Pulido opened the scoring for Cruz Azul with a well-placed shot past América's goalkeeper Prudencio Cortés. Shortly after, Fernando Bustos sent a precise cross that was headed by Octavio Muciño and finished by Cesáreo Victorino to make it 2–0. Cruz Azul dominated the match, and a one-two play between Bustos and Muciño near the end of the first half resulted in a third goal. Early in the second half, Muciño scored again to extend the lead to 4–0. América's only response came in the 90th minute, with a header from Enrique Borja. Cruz Azul's goalkeeper, Miguel Marín, delivered an outstanding performance, making several crucial saves to secure the victory. This win marked Cruz Azul's third league title.

=== Cruz Azul dominance (1973–79) ===
América sought redemption a year after their decisive loss in the 1971–72 league final by defeating Cruz Azul in the 1973–74 Copa México final. América secured a 3–2 aggregate victory, with two goals from Osvaldo Castro and one from Roberto Hodge. However, Cruz Azul responded in the same season by defeating América 2–1 in the 1974 Campeón de Campeones, avenging their Copa México loss from five months earlier. The goals for Cruz Azul were scored by Horacio López Salgado and Eladio Vera, while Osvaldo Castro netted for América. This victory marked Cruz Azul's eighth official title in competitions organized by the Federación Mexicana de Fútbol, including League, Cup, and Campeón de Campeones championships.

During the 1970s, Cruz Azul established their dominance by remaining unbeaten at home against América in all competitions, including Copa México, Campeón de Campeones, and the group-stage liguillas of the 1978–79 season. Between the 1977–78, 1978–79, and 1979–80 seasons, Cruz Azul maintained an unbeaten home record against all opponents for over a year and a half, setting the longest home unbeaten streak in Mexican football history. These successes significantly increased Cruz Azul's fan base in Mexico City.

Between 1970 and 1979, Cruz Azul won eight official titles across various competitions, while América secured six, including an Copa Interamericana victory against Boca Juniors. The teams faced each other in three finals during this decade, with Cruz Azul winning two of them.

=== Birth of the Nickname ===
"All I did was add the adjective, that's it. It was a spur-of-the-moment thing; I didn't think about it or analyze it. The Clásicos, this Clásico, were created by the Maríns, the Floreses, the Quintanos; the Cárdenases, who was champion with both teams; Carlos Reinoso, Enrique Borja—these are the real Clásicos, and those who strengthen them are the football fans."

— Gerardo Peña Kegel in 1980.

The term "Clásico Joven" (Young Classic) was first used on 24 May 1980, during a match between Cruz Azul and América on matchday 36 of the 1979–80 season. It was coined by sports journalist Gerardo Peña Kegel, who covered the training sessions of both teams at the time. Peña observed that both squads featured a significant number of young players, including Rafael Toribio, Guillermo Mendizábal, Sergio Rubio, and Adrián Camacho for Cruz Azul, and Héctor Zelada, Mario Trejo, Alfredo Tena, and Cristóbal Ortega for América. The nickname caught on and has since become synonymous with the rivalry.

=== America's revenge (1980–89) ===
Match ticket for the Clásico Joven between América and Cruz Azul, played at Estadio Azteca on 12 October 1986, during the 1986–87 season. Cruz Azul won the match 2–1.

The 1980s marked a period of league dominance for América. Not only did they claim a league title against Cruz Azul in the 1988–89 season, but they also eliminated Cruz Azul in the semifinals of the 1983–84 season and the quarterfinals of the México 1986 tournament. The decade also saw the most lopsided victory in the history of the rivalry when, in the 1981–82 season, América defeated Cruz Azul 5–0, eliminating them from any chance of reaching the playoffs, which were ultimately won by Tigres UANL.

The two teams faced off in the final of the 1988–89 season, with América securing the title after a 3–2 victory in the first leg and a 2–2 draw in the second leg. The decisive goal was scored by América's homegrown player, Carlos Hermosillo, who would later become a Cruz Azul legend by winning three individual scoring titles between 1993 and 1996. In the first leg, América built a lead with goals from Luís Roberto Alves, Carlos Hermosillo, and Antônio Carlos Santos, though Cruz Azul managed to fight back from a 2–0 deficit with goals from Porfirio Jiménez and Narciso Cuevas by the 39th minute.

In the second leg, América took an early lead with a goal from Juan Hernández, but Cruz Azul equalized the aggregate score at 4–4 with goals from Patricio Hernández and Ricardo Mojica. In the second half, Antonio Carlos Santos set up Carlos Hermosillo, who scored to secure a 2–2 draw and América's back-to-back league title. With this victory, América claimed their eighth league title.

By 1989, América capped off a golden era by winning eight league titles compared to Cruz Azul's single title during the decade, as well as dominating most head-to-head encounters between the two teams.

=== The Era of Liguillas (1990–99) ===
The 1990s were characterized by alternating dominance between the two teams, with América winning four playoff series and Cruz Azul winning three. During the 1990–91 season, the rivalry witnessed its most infamous brawl when Agustín Coss was kicked by Edu Manga near the end of a match. This incident sparked a fight that resulted in three Cruz Azul players and two América players being sent off.

In the 1991–92 playoff repechage, Cruz Azul eliminated América with a commanding 4–0 victory in the first leg, featuring goals from José Manuel de la Torre, Carlos Hermosillo, and Mario Ordiales. Goalkeeper Olaf Heredia delivered an outstanding performance. América won the second leg 2–0, with goals from Luis Roberto Alves and Eduardo Córdoba, but it was not enough to overturn the deficit.

The 1992–93 and 1993–94 playoffs also featured memorable encounters, with América eliminating Cruz Azul in both quarterfinals by aggregate scores of 6–4 and 3–2, respectively. However, Cruz Azul exacted revenge in the 1994–95 playoffs by defeating América 3–2 on aggregate to advance to the final, where they ultimately lost to Necaxa.

In the 1995–96 playoffs, América defeated Cruz Azul 3–2 on aggregate. The first leg featured goals from François Omam-Biyik and a double from Luis García. In the second leg, Francisco Palencia and Hermosillo gave Cruz Azul a 2–0 lead, but they were unable to score the additional goal needed to advance. One of the match's defining moments was a missed opportunity by Kalusha Bwalya, who hit the post with an open goal, allowing goalkeeper Norberto Scoponi to recover the ball. This was the last long-tournament match between the two teams.

In the Verano 1998 tournament, the teams clashed again in the playoffs, with América winning the series thanks to goals by Raúl Lara and Sergio Zárate. After this match, América did not defeat Cruz Azul at the Estadio Azteca in seven regular-season games until the Apertura 2004 tournament. Cruz Azul's revenge came in the Invierno 1999 playoffs, when they won 2–1 at the Azteca, with a header from Argentine Diego Latorre, eliminating América and propelling Cruz Azul to the finals.

=== The Americanista streak (2004–10) ===
Cruz Azul experienced a seven-game unbeaten streak at the Estadio Azteca that ended in 2004 with a 2–1 loss to América, sealed by a last-minute goal from Álvaro Ortiz. From 2003 onwards, Cruz Azul endured a seven-year stretch without defeating América in 16 consecutive official matches, whether at the Estadio Azul or the Estadio Azteca. This included seven consecutive losses to América between 2004 and 2006, marking the longest undefeated streak in the history of the Clásico Joven.

In the Clausura 2005 playoffs, América defeated Cruz Azul in the semifinals with a dominant 6–2 aggregate score. The first leg featured two goals by Cuauhtémoc Blanco and one by Claudio López, while Francisco Fonseca scored for Cruz Azul. In the second leg, América extended their lead with goals from Aarón Padilla, Francisco Torres, and Claudio López, while César Delgado scored Cruz Azul's lone goal. América advanced to the final, where they defeated Tecos UAG to claim their 10th league title.

The only match Cruz Azul won during this streak was a friendly played on 19 July 2008, in San Diego, California. Cruz Azul secured a 2–1 victory with a brace from Uruguayan Nicolás Vigneri, while América's goal came from Argentine-born naturalized Mexican Alfredo Moreno.

=== The rivalry intensifies (2011–13) ===
On 3 October 2010, Cruz Azul defeated América 1–0 at the Estadio Azul, ending América's seven-year, 16-game unbeaten streak against them. The winning goal was scored by Argentine Christian Giménez, who celebrated by mimicking the flight of an eagle, parodying América's mascot. This victory was Cruz Azul's first win in the Clásico Joven at the Estadio Azul since the Verano 2002 tournament, when they defeated América 2–0 with goals from Cesáreo Victorino and Sebastián Abreu. The win ended an eight-year drought in home matches against América.

On 13 March 2011, Cruz Azul defeated América 2–0 at the Estadio Azteca, with both goals scored by Emanuel Villa. This victory ended another streak for América, as Cruz Azul had not beaten them at the Azteca since the Apertura 2003 tournament. Cruz Azul's last victory at the Azteca had been on 4 May 2003, with a 3–1 win. Goals for Cruz Azul came from Francisco Palencia (two) and Juan Carlos Cacho, while América's lone goal was scored by Uruguayan Marcelo Lipatín.

On 6 November 2011, Cruz Azul defeated América 3–1 in the Apertura 2011 tournament, pushing América to second-to-last place in the standings. However, in the Clausura 2013 tournament, América responded with a resounding 3–0 victory, led by a hat-trick from Christian Benítez. One month later, in the Clausura 2013 Copa MX, Cruz Azul eliminated América in the semifinals via a penalty shoot-out and went on to win the tournament.

==== The Clausura 2013 final ====
The Clausura 2013 tournament culminated in a final between Cruz Azul and América. Cruz Azul entered the final seeking their first league title in 15 years, while América had gone eight years without lifting the championship. The first leg, held on 23 May 2013, at the Estadio Azul, ended in a 1–0 victory for Cruz Azul, with the goal scored by Christian Giménez.

The decisive second leg took place on 26 May 2013, at the Estadio Azteca in what would become one of the most memorable matches in Mexican league history. This match recorded the highest television ratings for a Liga MX final. Early in the match, América was reduced to ten players after Jesús Molina was sent off in the 14th minute. Six minutes later, Teófilo Gutiérrez scored for Cruz Azul, giving them a 1–0 lead in the match and a 2–0 advantage on aggregate. Gutiérrez had another crucial opportunity in the 73rd minute to seal the victory, but his shot hit the post from close range with the goalkeeper out of position.

With Cruz Azul seemingly on the brink of victory—so much so that their name had begun to be inscribed on the championship trophy—América launched a dramatic comeback. In the 88th minute, Aquivaldo Mosquera headed in a goal to reduce the aggregate deficit to 2–1. In stoppage time (92nd minute), América’s goalkeeper Moisés Muñoz came forward for a corner kick and scored a header, deflected into the net by Cruz Azul's Alejandro Castro, to tie the aggregate score at 2–2 and force extra time. The additional 30 minutes failed to produce a winner, and the championship was decided via penalty shoot-out.

In the shootout, Cruz Azul's Javier Orozco had his penalty saved by Muñoz, while América’s Raúl Jiménez scored the first penalty. Alejandro Castro slipped during his attempt, sending the ball over the bar, and Christian Benítez converted to extend América's lead. Rogelio Chávez then scored for Cruz Azul, but Osvaldo Martínez restored América's advantage. Gerardo Flores scored Cruz Azul's second penalty, but Miguel Layún sealed the victory for América, converting the decisive penalty and securing América's 11th league title.

=== Recent Era (2014–Present) ===
In the Apertura 2014 tournament, Cruz Azul defeated América 4–0, marking the third time in history that Cruz Azul achieved this scoreline against their rivals. However, following this match, Cruz Azul entered a winless streak against América that spanned 16 consecutive matches. This included their elimination in the quarterfinals of the Apertura 2017, where both legs ended in 0–0 draws, with América advancing due to their higher position in the league table. Cruz Azul was also eliminated by América in the Copa MX of the same year.

América's dominance ended during the second leg of the Clausura 2019 quarterfinals, when Cruz Azul secured a 1–0 victory thanks to a goal by Uruguayan forward Jonathan Rodríguez. Despite this win, it was not enough for Cruz Azul to overturn the aggregate score, as América had won the first leg 3–1, with an own goal by Igor Lichnovsky and two goals from Roger Martínez. Milton Caraglio had scored Cruz Azul's lone goal in the first leg through a penalty.

==== The Fourth Final: Apertura 2018 ====
Cruz Azul and América faced each other in yet another final, offering the possibility of a celeste revenge. Heading into the match, Cruz Azul had the opportunity to equal América with two finals won apiece. Adding intrigue to the encounter, Ricardo Peláez, who had previously served as América's sporting president, was now working with Cruz Azul. Additionally, Cruz Azul's roster included four former América players—Adrián Aldrete, Pablo Aguilar, Martín Zúñiga, and José Madueña—all of whom had won titles with América. Further fueling the rivalry, Cruz Azul had returned to the Estadio Azteca as their home venue for the tournament, which sparked controversy and dissatisfaction among América supporters.

Cruz Azul and América entered the final as the top two seeds in the league standings, with Cruz Azul boasting the best defensive record of the tournament and América having the strongest offense. Similar to the 2013 final, Cruz Azul was pursuing the domestic double, having already won the Apertura 2018 Copa MX.

The first leg ended in a goalless draw, with few notable moments apart from a post-match scuffle between América goalkeeper Agustín Marchesín and Cruz Azul's fitness coach. In the second leg, Edson Álvarez broke the deadlock in the 50th minute, capitalizing on an error by Iván Marcone after a ball was intercepted by Oribe Peralta. Álvarez scored again in the 89th minute on a counterattack, securing América's 13th league title.

==== Cruz Azul's biggest victory (Apertura 2019) ====
On 5 October 2019, Cruz Azul and América met once again during matchday 13 of the Apertura 2019 at the Estadio Azteca, with Cruz Azul as the designated home team. In the 15th minute, Cruz Azul opened the scoring with a header by Julio César Domínguez off a corner kick from the left. Domínguez outjumped Bruno Valdez and sent the ball past goalkeeper Guillermo Ochoa. América equalized in the 36th minute when Guido Rodríguez unleashed a long-range strike that Jesús Corona could not stop. Three minutes later, Henry Martín capitalized on a bouncing ball that went over Pablo Aguilar and scored with a left-footed shot from the edge of the box, putting América ahead 2–1 by halftime.

The second half saw a dramatic turnaround for Cruz Azul. In the 51st minute, América's Roger Martínez was sent off for an elbow to Rafael Baca. Two minutes later, in the 53rd minute, Pablo Aguilar scored a header off a corner kick, leveling the match at 2–2. Just five minutes later, Cruz Azul took the lead with a set-piece goal. Roberto Alvarado headed in a cross at the far post to make it 3–2 in the 58th minute.

In the 61st minute, Cruz Azul added a fourth goal. A long clearance by Corona found Orbelín Pineda, who dribbled past two América defenders and scored with a precise left-footed strike. Cruz Azul sealed the victory in the 74th minute when Jonathan Rodríguez scored after an impressive solo run, chipping the ball past Ochoa for the fifth goal.

This 5–2 victory marked the first time Cruz Azul scored five goals against América, making it their most significant result in the history of the Clásico Joven. It occurred five years after their 4–0 win in the Apertura 2014.

==== América's biggest victory (Apertura 2022) ====
On 20 August 2022, Cruz Azul and América faced off again during matchday 10 of the Apertura 2022 at the Estadio Azteca, with América as the home team. The two teams arrived in vastly different circumstances: América, under the management of Fernando Ortiz, was fighting to secure a direct playoff spot after a rocky start to the tournament. In contrast, Cruz Azul, now led by Diego Aguirre, had lost many key players who contributed to their historic ninth title and was struggling at the bottom of the standings, outside playoff contention.

In the first half, América initially faced difficulty breaking through Cruz Azul's defense. However, in the 14th minute, Richard Sánchez scored the opening goal with a long-range strike after a pass from Álvaro Fidalgo. Eight minutes later, Henry Martín took advantage of a defensive lapse by Ramiro Funes Mori and set up Jonathan Rodríguez to double the lead.

Cruz Azul attempted to respond in the 44th minute when Carlos Rotondi appeared to reduce the deficit to 2–1. However, following a VAR review, referee Luis Enrique Santander disallowed the goal due to a prior foul on América's Emilio Lara. Before halftime, VAR intervened again, leading to the expulsion of Rafael Baca for a hard foul on Henry Martín. On the resulting free kick, Diego Valdés scored to give América a 3–0 lead.

The second half offered no respite for Cruz Azul. Substitutions by Ángel Romero and Michael Estrada for Carlos Rodríguez and Gonzalo Carneiro failed to improve their performance. In the 53rd minute, Henry Martín scored his second goal to make it 4–0.

The situation worsened for Cruz Azul as América scored three more goals in the closing stages. Álvaro Fidalgo, Federico Viñas, and Salvador Reyes, the latter two coming off the bench, scored in the 73rd, 85th, and 90th minutes, respectively, to complete a historic 7–0 victory.

This result solidified América's playoff ambitions while marking the worst defeat in the history of the rivalry and for Cruz Azul as a club. The loss prompted immediate changes within Cruz Azul, including the dismissal of Diego Aguirre as head coach just hours after the match.

==== Recent Encounters (2025) ====
The two clubs met in the quarter-finals of the 2025 CONCACAF Champions Cup, marking the first time they had faced each other in the history of the competition. The first-leg ended in a 0–0 draw at the Estadio Ciudad de los Deportes. In the second-leg, held at the Estadio Olímpico Universitario, Cruz Azul secured a 2–1 victory, with both goals scored by Ángel Sepúlveda, to eliminate América and advance to the semi-finals.

Weeks later, they faced each other again in the Clausura 2025 semi-finals. Cruz Azul won the first-leg 1–0 with a goal from captain Ignacio Rivero. América won the second-leg 2–1, with goals from captain Henry Martín and Cristian Borja. With the aggregate score level at 2–2, América advanced to the final based on their higher placement in the regular season standings.

== Players who played on both sides ==
Several players have represented both América and Cruz Azul over the years. A smaller group has achieved titles with both teams.

Players in bold won at least one official title with both clubs.

- **(Mexico) Amado Palacios**
- **(Mexico) Javier Sánchez Galindo**
- (Mexico) Sergio Ceballos
- (Mexico) Francisco Macedo
- (Argentina) Silvio Fogel
- (Mexico) Alberto Macías
- (Mexico) Nicolás Ramírez
- **(Mexico) Cesáreo Victorino**
- **(Mexico) Horacio López Salgado**
- **(Argentina) Miguel Ángel Cornero**
- (Argentina) Rubén Omar Romano
- **(Mexico) Héctor Tapia**
- **(Mexico) Adrián Camacho**
- (Mexico) Agustín Manzo
- (Mexico) Luis Hernández
- **(Mexico) Carlos Hermosillo**
- (Mexico) Pedro Pineda
- (Mexico) Arturo Álvarez
- (Mexico) Héctor Islas
- (Mexico) Adrián Chávez
- (Mexico) Miguel Zepeda
- (Mexico) Edoardo Isella
- (Uruguay) Sebastián Abreu
- (Uruguay) Richard Núñez
- **(Argentina) (Mexico) Christian Giménez**
- (Mexico) Alfonso Blanco
- (Mexico) Francisco Javier Rodríguez
- (Argentina) (Mexico) Matías Vuoso
- **(Mexico) Adrián Aldrete**
- **(Mexico) José Madueña**
- **(Paraguay) Pablo Aguilar**
- (Mexico) Jordan Silva
- (Mexico) Alonso Escoboza
- **(Uruguay) Jonathan Rodríguez**
- **(Chile) Igor Lichnovsky**
- **(Mexico) Jorge Sánchez**
- (Mexico) Alexis Gutiérrez
- (United States) Ralph Orquin

== Notable meetups ==
- 1972 Primera División Final
- 1974 Campeón de Campeones
- 1989 Primera División Finals
- 2013 Clausura Finals
- 2018 Apertura Finals
- 2024 Clausura Finals
- 2024 Apertura Semi-finals
- 2025 CONCACAF Champions Cup Quarter-finals
- 2025 Clausura Semi-finals

== Statistics ==
=== Head-to-head ===
As of match played on 1 October 2026

This table takes into account all disputed tournaments that have been endorsed by the Mexican Football Federation, CONCACAF, or any other tournaments and friendlies.

| Competition | Matches | América wins | Draws | Cruz Azul wins | América goals | Cruz Azul goals |
|---|---|---|---|---|---|---|
| League | 125 | 40 | 48 | 37 | 186 | 173 |
| Liguilla/Playoffs | 39 | 18 | 11 | 10 | 53 | 41 |
| Copa México/Copa Presidente/Copa MX | 14 | 8 | 3 | 3 | 23 | 13 |
| Campeón de Campeones | 1 | 0 | 0 | 1 | 1 | 2 |
| CONCACAF Champions Cup | 2 | 0 | 1 | 1 | 1 | 2 |
| Subtotal | 181 | 66 | 63 | 52 | 264 | 231 |
Other Tournaments and Friendlies
| Pre Pre Libertadores | 3 | 1 | 1 | 1 | 3 | 2 |
| InterLiga | 1 | 0 | 1 | 0 | 3 | 3 |
| Exhibition games | 22 | 7 | 5 | 10 | 32 | 33 |
| Total | 207 | 74 | 70 | 63 | 302 | 269 |

=== All-time results ===
==== América in the league at home ====
| Date | Venue | Score | Competition |
|---|---|---|---|
| 10 December 1964 | Estadio Olímpico Universitario | 1–1 | Primera División de México |
| 13 June 1965 | Estadio Olímpico Universitario | 4–1 | Primera División de México |
| 8 December 1966 | Estadio Azteca | 5–3 | Primera División de México |
| 17 September 1967 | Estadio Azteca | 0–0 | Primera División de México |
| 9 June 1968 | Estadio Azteca | 0–2 | Primera División de México |
| 28 September 1969 | Estadio Azteca | 1–4 | Primera División de México |
| 7 May 1970 | Estadio Olímpico Universitario | 3–0 | Primera División de México |
| 4 July 1971 | Estadio Azteca | 3–0 | Primera División de México |
| 27 April 1972 | Estadio Azteca | 2–2 | Primera División de México |
| 17 December 1972 | Estadio Azteca | 0–0 | Primera División de México |
| 4 October 1973 | Estadio Azteca | 2–1 | Primera División de México |
| 4 May 1975 | Estadio Azteca | 0–2 | Primera División de México |
| 18 March 1976 | Estadio Azteca | 4–2 | Primera División de México |
| 2 January 1977 | Estadio Azteca | 1–2 | Primera División de México |
| 29 April 1978 | Estadio Azteca | 1–1 | Primera División de México |
| 18 November 1978 | Estadio Azteca | 0–0 | Primera División de México |
| 13 January 1980 | Estadio Azteca | 1–1 | Primera División de México |
| 8 February 1981 | Estadio Azteca | 1–2 | Primera División de México |
| 17 January 1982 | Estadio Azteca | 1–1 | Primera División de México |
| 13 March 1983 | Estadio Azteca | 0–0 | Primera División de México |
| 4 March 1984 | Estadio Azteca | 1–1 | Primera División de México |
| 17 February 1985 | Estadio Azteca | 2–2 | Primera División de México |
| 12 October 1986 | Estadio Azteca | 1–2 | Primera División de México |
| 3 January 1988 | Estadio Azteca | 2–2 | Primera División de México |
| 5 April 1989 | Estadio Azteca | 1–2 | Primera División de México |
| 17 December 1989 | Estadio Azteca | 2–0 | Primera División de México |
| 24 March 1991 | Estadio Azteca | 3–3 | Primera División de México |
| 16 February 1992 | Estadio Azteca | 1–1 | Primera División de México |
| 29 November 1992 | Estadio Azteca | 3–1 | Primera División de México |
| 19 September 1993 | Estadio Azteca | 0–3 | Primera División de México |
| 5 February 1995 | Estadio Azteca | 3–1 | Primera División de México |
| 24 March 1996 | Estadio Azteca | 1–2 | Primera División de México |
| 10 September 1996 | Estadio Azteca | 2–1 | Primera División de México |
| 4 April 1998 | Estadio Azteca | 1–1 | Primera División de México |
| 30 October 1998 | Estadio Azteca | 1–3 | Primera División de México |
| 20 October 1999 | Estadio Azteca | 1–3 | Primera División de México |
| 17 February 2001 | Estadio Azteca | 0–0 | Primera División de México |
| 12 September 2001 | Estadio Azteca | 1–2 | Primera División de México |
| 4 May 2003 | Estadio Azteca | 1–3 | Primera División de México |
| 10 August 2003 | Estadio Azteca | 1–1 | Primera División de México |
| 13 November 2004 | Estadio Azteca | 2–1 | Primera División de México |
| 6 November 2005 | Estadio Azteca | 1–0 | Primera División de México |
| 11 March 2007 | Estadio Azteca | 0–0 | Primera División de México |
| 30 September 2007 | Estadio Azteca | 2–2 | Primera División de México |
| 28 September 2008 | Estadio Azteca | 2–0 | Primera División de México |
| 14 February 2010 | Estadio Azteca | 2–0 | Primera División de México |
| 13 March 2011 | Estadio Azteca | 0–2 | Primera División de México |
| 20 April 2012 | Estadio Azteca | 2–2 | Primera División de México |
| 2 March 2013 | Estadio Azteca | 3–0 | Liga MX |
| 5 April 2014 | Estadio Azteca | 1–2 | Liga MX |
| 4 April 2015 | Estadio Azteca | 1–0 | Liga MX |
| 20 February 2016 | Estadio Azteca | 3–3 | Liga MX |
| 25 February 2017 | Estadio Azteca | 2–0 | Liga MX |
| 31 March 2018 | Estadio Azteca | 2–1 | Liga MX |
| 14 April 2019 | Estadio Azteca | 0–0 | Liga MX |
| 15 March 2020 | Estadio Azteca | 0–1 | Liga MX |
| 17 April 2021 | Estadio Azteca | 1–1 | Liga MX |
| 30 April 2022 | Estadio Azteca | 0–0 | Liga MX |
| 20 August 2022 | Estadio Azteca | 7–0 | Liga MX |
| 24 February 2024 | Estadio Azteca | 1–0 | Liga MX |
| 12 April 2025 | Estadio Ciudad de los Deportes | 0–0 | Liga MX |
| 11 April 2026 | Estadio Azteca | 1–1 | Liga MX |

==== Cruz Azul in the league at home ====
| Date | Venue | Score | Competition |
|---|---|---|---|
| 30 August 1964 | Estadio 10 de Diciembre | 1–2 | Primera División de México |
| 26 September 1965 | Estadio 10 de Diciembre | 2–2 | Primera División de México |
| 28 August 1966 | Estadio 10 de Diciembre | 2–3 | Primera División de México |
| 31 December 1967 | Estadio 10 de Diciembre | 1–0 | Primera División de México |
| 29 December 1968 | Estadio 10 de Diciembre | 2–0 | Primera División de México |
| 15 June 1969 | Estadio 10 de Diciembre | 2–2 | Primera División de México |
| 22 March 1970 | Estadio 10 de Diciembre | 0–1 | Primera División de México |
| 7 March 1971 | Estadio 10 de Diciembre | 1–1 | Primera División de México |
| 1 January 1972 | Estadio Azteca | 2–1 | Primera División de México |
| 14 April 1973 | Estadio Azteca | 2–2 | Primera División de México |
| 23 March 1974 | Estadio Azteca | 4–2 | Primera División de México |
| 9 November 1974 | Estadio Azteca | 0–0 | Primera División de México |
| 8 November 1975 | Estadio Azteca | 2–2 | Primera División de México |
| 14 May 1977 | Estadio Azteca | 2–1 | Primera División de México |
| 17 December 1977 | Estadio Azteca | 1–1 | Primera División de México |
| 31 March 1979 | Estadio Azteca | 3–1 | Primera División de México |
| 24 May 1980 | Estadio Azteca | 2–0 | Primera División de México |
| 20 June 1981 | Estadio Azteca | 0–0 | Primera División de México |
| 15 May 1982 | Estadio Azteca | 0–5 | Primera División de México |
| 6 November 1982 | Estadio Azteca | 1–1 | Primera División de México |
| 22 October 1983 | Estadio Azteca | 0–2 | Primera División de México |
| 6 October 1984 | Estadio Azteca | 1–0 | Primera División de México |
| 7 March 1987 | Estadio Azteca | 2–2 | Primera División de México |
| 28 May 1988 | Estadio Azteca | 2–4 | Primera División de México |
| 3 December 1988 | Estadio Azteca | 1–3 | Primera División de México |
| 21 April 1990 | Estadio Azteca | 0–3 | Primera División de México |
| 18 November 1990 | Estadio Azteca | 1–1 | Primera División de México |
| 26 October 1991 | Estadio Azteca | 1–1 | Primera División de México |
| 19 April 1993 | Estadio Azteca | 1–1 | Primera División de México |
| 22 January 1994 | Estadio Azteca | 1–0 | Primera División de México |
| 1 October 1994 | Estadio Azteca | 1–1 | Primera División de México |
| 2 December 1995 | Estadio Azteca | 1–1 | Primera División de México |
| 1 February 1997 | Estadio Azteca | 2–1 | Primera División de México |
| 26 October 1997 | Estadio Azul | 0–1 | Primera División de México |
| 17 April 1999 | Estadio Azul | 4–0 | Primera División de México |
| 11 March 2000 | Estadio Azul | 2–3 | Primera División de México |
| 16 September 2000 | Estadio Azul | 1–0 | Primera División de México |
| 16 February 2002 | Estadio Azul | 2–0 | Primera División de México |
| 9 November 2002 | Estadio Azul | 1–1 | Primera División de México |
| 24 January 2004 | Estadio Azul | 1–1 | Primera División de México |
| 30 April 2005 | Estadio Azul | 2–3 | Primera División de México |
| 15 April 2006 | Estadio Azul | 1–3 | Primera División de México |
| 16 September 2006 | Estadio Azul | 1–2 | Primera División de México |
| 16 March 2008 | Estadio Azul | 2–2 | Primera División de México |
| 14 March 2009 | Estadio Azul | 1–3 | Primera División de México |
| 22 August 2009 | Estadio Azul | 2–3 | Primera División de México |
| 3 October 2010 | Estadio Azul | 1–0 | Primera División de México |
| 5 November 2011 | Estadio Azul | 3–1 | Primera División de México |
| 22 September 2012 | Estadio Azul | 1–1 | Liga MX |
| 19 October 2013 | Estadio Azul | 1–1 | Liga MX |
| 4 October 2014 | Estadio Azul | 4–0 | Liga MX |
| 29 August 2015 | Estadio Azul | 0–2 | Liga MX |
| 10 September 2016 | Estadio Azul | 3–4 | Liga MX |
| 14 October 2017 | Estadio Azul | 1–3 | Liga MX |
| 27 October 2018 | Estadio Azteca | 0–0 | Liga MX |
| 5 October 2019 | Estadio Azteca | 5–2 | Liga MX |
| 27 September 2020 | Estadio Azteca | 0–0 | Liga MX |
| 31 October 2021 | Estadio Azteca | 2–1 | Liga MX |
| 15 April 2023 | Estadio Azteca | 1–3 | Liga MX |
| 2 September 2023 | Estadio Azteca | 2–3 | Liga MX |
| 31 August 2024 | Estadio Ciudad de los Deportes | 4–1 | Liga MX |
| 18 October 2025 | Estadio Olímpico Universitario | 2–1 | Liga MX |
| 12 September 2026 | Estadio Azteca | 4–3 | Liga MX |

==== Total league head-to-head ====
League home record
| Home team | Wins | Losses | Draws |
| América | 20 | 16 | 26 |
| Cruz Azul | 21 | 20 | 22 |

Overall league head-to-head record
| América wins | Cruz Azul wins | Draws |
| 40 | 37 | 48 |

==== Liguilla matches ====
| # | Date | Venue | Result | Competition |
|---|---|---|---|---|
| 1 | 9 August 1972 | Estadio Azteca | Cruz Azul 4–1 América | 1971–72 Final |
| 2 | 13 June 1979 | Estadio Azteca | América 1–0 Cruz Azul | 1978–79 Semi-finals |
| 3 | 17 June 1979 | Estadio Azteca | Cruz Azul 2–1 América | 1978–79 Semi-finals |
| 4 | 31 May 1984 | Estadio Azteca | Cruz Azul 0–2 América | 1983–84 Semi-finals |
| 5 | 3 June 1984 | Estadio Azteca | América 0–0 Cruz Azul | 1983–84 Semi-finals |
| 6 | 13 February 1986 | Estadio Azteca | Cruz Azul 0–1 América | México 1986 Quarter-finals |
| 7 | 16 February 1986 | Estadio Azteca | América 1–0 Cruz Azul | México 1986 Quarter-finals |
| 8 | 13 July 1989 | Estadio Azteca | Cruz Azul 2–3 América | 1988–89 Finals |
| 9 | 16 July 1989 | Estadio Azteca | América 2–2 Cruz Azul | 1988–89 Finals |
| 10 | 13 May 1992 | Estadio Azteca | América 2–0 Cruz Azul | 1991–92 Qualification Liguilla |
| 11 | 16 May 1992 | Estadio Azteca | Cruz Azul 4–0 América | 1991–92 Qualification Liguilla |
| 12 | 13 May 1993 | Estadio Azteca | Cruz Azul 0–3 América | 1992–93 Quarter-finals |
| 13 | 16 May 1993 | Estadio Azteca | América 3–4 Cruz Azul | 1992–93 Quarter-finals |
| 14 | 13 April 1994 | Estadio Azteca | América 1–1 Cruz Azul | 1993–94 Quarter-finals |
| 15 | 17 April 1994 | Estadio Azteca | Cruz Azul 1–2 América | 1993–94 Quarter-finals |
| 16 | 25 May 1995 | Estadio Azteca | Cruz Azul 1–1 América | 1994–95 Semi-finals |
| 17 | 29 May 1995 | Estadio Azteca | América 1–2 Cruz Azul | 1994–95 Semi-finals |
| 18 | 17 April 1996 | Estadio Azteca | Cruz Azul 0–3 América | 1995–96 Quarter-finals |
| 19 | 21 April 1996 | Estadio Azteca | América 0–2 Cruz Azul | 1995–96 Quarter-finals |
| 20 | 16 April 1998 | Estadio Azul | Cruz Azul 1–1 América | Verano 1998 Quarter-finals |
| 21 | 19 April 1998 | Estadio Azteca | América 2–1 Cruz Azul | Verano 1998 Quarter-finals |
| 22 | 8 December 1999 | Estadio Azul | Cruz Azul 0–0 América | Invierno 1999 Semi-finals |
| 23 | 11 December 1999 | Estadio Azteca | América 1–2 Cruz Azul | Invierno 1999 Semi-finals |
| 24 | 26 May 2005 | Estadio Azteca | América 3–1 Cruz Azul | Clausura 2005 Semi-finals |
| 25 | 29 May 2005 | Estadio Azul | Cruz Azul 1–3 América | Clausura 2005 Semi-finals |
| 26 | 23 May 2013 | Estadio Azul | Cruz Azul 1–0 América | Clausura 2013 Finals |
| 27 | 26 May 2013 | Estadio Azteca | América 2–1 Cruz Azul | Clausura 2013 Finals |
| 28 | 23 November 2017 | Estadio Azul | Cruz Azul 0–0 América | Apertura 2017 Quarter-finals |
| 29 | 26 November 2017 | Estadio Azteca | América 0–0 Cruz Azul | Apertura 2017 Quarter-finals |
| 30 | 13 December 2018 | Estadio Azteca | América 0–0 Cruz Azul | Apertura 2018 Finals |
| 31 | 16 December 2018 | Estadio Azteca | Cruz Azul 0–2 América | Apertura 2018 Finals |
| 32 | 13 May 2019 | Estadio Azteca | América 3–1 Cruz Azul | Clausura 2019 Quarter-finals |
| 33 | 16 May 2019 | Estadio Azteca | Cruz Azul 1–0 América | Clausura 2019 Quarter-finals |
| 34 | 23 May 2024 | Estadio Ciudad de los Deportes | Cruz Azul 1–1 América | Clausura 2024 Finals |
| 35 | 26 May 2024 | Estadio Azteca | América 1–0 Cruz Azul | Clausura 2024 Finals |
| 36 | 5 December 2024 | Estadio Ciudad de los Deportes | América 0–0 Cruz Azul | Apertura 2024 Semi-finals |
| 37 | 8 December 2024 | Estadio Ciudad de los Deportes | Cruz Azul 3–4 América | Apertura 2024 Semi-finals |
| 38 | 15 May 2025 | Estadio Olímpico Universitario | Cruz Azul 1–0 América | Clausura 2025 Semi-finals |
| 39 | 18 May 2025 | Estadio Ciudad de los Deportes | América 2–1 Cruz Azul | Clausura 2025 Semi-finals |

==== Total liguilla head-to-head ====
Overall liguilla head-to-head record
| América wins | Cruz Azul wins | Draws |
| 18 | 10 | 11 |

==== Copa MX ====
| Date | Venue | Matches | | | Competition |
| Date | Venue | Home | Score | Away | Competition |
|---|---|---|---|---|---|
| 21 February 1965 | Estadio 10 de Diciembre | Cruz Azul | 0–1 | América | 1964–65 Copa México Semi-finals |
| 28 February 1965 | Estadio Olímpico Universitario | América | 2–2 (a.e.t) | Cruz Azul | 1964–65 Copa México Semi-finals |
| 23 February 1966 | Estadio Olímpico Universitario | América | 3–0 | Cruz Azul | 1965–66 Copa México Group 3 |
| 20 March 1966 | Estadio 10 de Diciembre | Cruz Azul | 1–2 | América | 1965–66 Copa México Group 3 |
| 17 November 1968 | Estadio Azteca | América | 0–1 | Cruz Azul | 1968–69 Copa México Quarter-finals |
| 15 December 1968 | Estadio 10 de Diciembre | Cruz Azul | 1–0 | América | 1968–69 Copa México Quarter-finals |
| 26 September 1971 | Estadio Azteca | América | 1–2 (a.e.t) | Cruz Azul | 1970–71 Copa México Quarterfinal |
| 18 November 1973 | Estadio Azteca | América | 3–2 | Cruz Azul | 1973–74 Copa México Group 1 |
| 13 December 1973 | Estadio Azteca | Cruz Azul | 1–1 | América | 1973–74 Copa México Finals |
| 16 December 1973 | Estadio Azteca | América | 2–1 | Cruz Azul | 1973–74 Copa México Finals |
| 24 October 1990 | Estadio Azteca | Cruz Azul | 1–4 | América | 1990–91 Copa México Semi-finals |
| 31 October 1990 | Estadio Azteca | América | 2–0 | Cruz Azul | 1990–91 Copa México Semi-finals |
| 3 April 2013 | Estadio Azteca | América | 1–1 (Note: Cruz Azul won 5–4 on penalties.) | Cruz Azul | Clausura 2013 Copa MX Semi-final |
| 24 October 2017 | Estadio Azteca | América | 1–0 | Cruz Azul | Apertura 2017 Copa MX Round of 16 |

Overall Copa MX head-to-head record
| América wins | Cruz Azul wins | Draws |
| 8 | 3 | 3 |

==== Campeón de Campeones ====
| Date | Venue | Matches | | | Competition |
| Date | Venue | Home | Score | Away | Competition |
|---|---|---|---|---|---|
| 26 May 1974 | Estadio Azteca | Cruz Azul | 2–1 | América | 1974 Campeón de Campeones |

==== CONCACAF Champions Cup ====
| Date | Venue | Matches | | | Competition |
| Date | Venue | Home | Score | Away | Competition |
|---|---|---|---|---|---|
| 1 April 2025 | Estadio Ciudad de los Deportes | América | 0–0 | Cruz Azul | 2025 CONCACAF Champions Cup Quarter-finals |
| 8 April 2025 | Estadio Olímpico Universitario | Cruz Azul | 2–1 | América | 2025 CONCACAF Champions Cup Quarter-finals |

Overall CONCACAF Champions Cup head-to-head record
| América wins | Cruz Azul wins | Draws |
| 0 | 1 | 1 |

==== Pre Pre Libertadores ====
| Date | Venue | Matches | | | Competition |
| Date | Venue | Home | Score | Away | Competition |
|---|---|---|---|---|---|
| 1 September 1999 | Soldier Field | Cruz Azul | 1–1 | América | 1999 Pre Pre Libertadores |
| 6 September 2000 | Bulldog Stadium | América | 0–1 | Cruz Azul | 2000 Pre Pre Libertadores |
| 22 August 2001 | Soldier Field | Cruz Azul | 0–2 | América | 2001 Pre Pre Libertadores |

Overall Pre Pre Libertadores head-to-head record
| América wins | Cruz Azul wins | Draws |
| 1 | 1 | 1 |

==== InterLiga ====
| Date | Venue | Matches | | | Competition |
| Date | Venue | Home | Score | Away | Competition |
|---|---|---|---|---|---|
| 12 January 2008 | Home Depot Center | América | 3–3 (a.e.t) (Note: América won 5–3 on penalties.) | Cruz Azul | 2008 InterLiga |

==== Results in friendly matches ====
| Date | Venue | Matches | | | Competition |
| Date | Venue | Home | Score | Away | Competition |
|---|---|---|---|---|---|
| 23 June 1963 | Estadio 10 de Diciembre | Cruz Azul | 0–4 | América | Friendly |
| 25 May 1969 | Estadio Nemesio Díez | Cruz Azul | 2–1 | América | Lic. Fernández Albarrán |
| 10 August 1974 | Los Angeles Memorial Coliseum | Cruz Azul | 1–2 (a.e.t) | América | Copa João Havelange |
| 10 May 1981 | Estadio Azteca | Cruz Azul | 2–1 | América | Azteca 81 |
| 17 November 1981 | Estadio Revolución Mexicana | Cruz Azul | 4–1 | América | Hidalgo 81 |
| 12 August 1987 | Estadio Azteca | América | 1–1 | Cruz Azul | Copa Azteca |
| 12 July 1997 | Estadio Hidalgo | América | 0–1 | Cruz Azul | Copa Pachuca |
| 15 July 1998 | Estadio Hidalgo | América | 2–2 (Note: Cruz Azul won 4–3 on penalties.) | Cruz Azul | Copa Pachuca |
| 10 March 1999 | Cotton Bowl | Cruz Azul | 1–1 | América | Friendly |
| 23 February 2005 | Robertson Stadium | Cruz Azul | 1–1 | América | Friendly |
| 19 July 2008 | Qualcomm Stadium | Cruz Azul | 2–1 | América | Friendly |
| 25 March 2009 | Sun Bowl | América | 2–0 | Cruz Azul | Friendly |
| 10 July 2010 | Rose Bowl | América | 2–1 | Cruz Azul | Friendly |
| 11 July 2012 | Cotton Bowl | Cruz Azul | 2–1 | América | Friendly |
| 30 June 2013 | Toyota Stadium | Cruz Azul | 2–1 | América | Friendly |
| 12 July 2014 | Estadio Azul | Cruz Azul | 0–1 | América | Friendly |
| 11 July 2020 | Estadio Olímpico Universitario | América | 1–4 | Cruz Azul | 2020 Copa por México |
| 29 January 2022 | Nido Águila Coapa | América | 3–1 | Cruz Azul | Friendly |
| 11 December 2022 | Estadio Nemesio Díez | América | 1–2 | Cruz Azul | 2022 Copa por México |
| 24 June 2023 | Nido Águila Coapa | América | 3–1 | Cruz Azul | Friendly |
| 23 March 2024 | Dignity Health Sports Park | América | 2–3 | Cruz Azul | Friendly |
| 1 October 2026 | Snapdragon Stadium | América | 0–0 | Cruz Azul | Friendly |

Overall friendly matches head-to-head record
| América wins | Cruz Azul wins | Draws |
| 7 | 10 | 5 |
