= 1971–72 Mexican Primera División season =

30th professional season of the top-flight football league in Mexico

Primera División de México
- Season: 1971–72
- Champions: Cruz Azul (3rd title)
- Relegated: Irapuato
- Matches: 317
- Goals: 824 (2.6 per match)

Statistics of the Primera División de México for the 1971–72 season.

== Overview ==
San Luis was promoted to Primera División.

This season was contested by 18 teams, and Cruz Azul won the championship.

Irapuato was relegated to Segunda División.

=== Teams ===
Location of the 1971-72 Primera División teams

Team	City	Stadium
América	Mexico City	Azteca
Atlante	Mexico City	Azteca
Atlético Español	Mexico City	Azteca
Cruz Azul	Mexico City	Azteca
Guadalajara	Guadalajara, Jalisco	Jalisco
Irapuato	Irapuato, Guanajuato	Irapuato
Jalisco	Guadalajara, Jalisco	Jalisco
Laguna	Torreón, Coahuila	San Isidro
León	León, Guanajuato	León
Monterrey	Monterrey, Nuevo León	Tecnológico
Pachuca	Pachuca, Hidalgo	Revolución Mexicana
Puebla	Puebla, Puebla	Cuauhtémoc
San Luis	San Luis Potosí, S.L.P.	Plan de San Luis
Toluca	Toluca, State of Mexico	Toluca 70
Torreón	Torreón, Coahuila	Moctezuma
UNAM	Mexico City	Olímpico Universitario
Veracruz	Veracruz, Veracruz	Veracruzano
Zacatepec	Zacatepec, Morelos	Agustín "Coruco" Díaz

== Group stage ==
=== Group 1 ===
Pos	Team	Pld	W	D	L	GF	GA	GD	Pts	Qualification
1	Cruz Azul	34	22	7	5	65	36	+29	51	Playoffs
2	América	34	20	8	6	70	35	+35	48	Playoffs
3	Jalisco	34	15	9	10	57	48	+9	39	
4	León	34	12	11	11	76	58	+18	35	
5	Zacatepec	34	11	12	11	34	36	−2	34	
6	Laguna	34	9	15	10	34	34	0	33	
7	San Luis	34	11	10	13	37	47	−10	32	
8	Veracruz	34	8	13	13	40	51	−11	29	Relegation Playoffs
9	Atlético Español	34	8	8	18	48	72	−24	24	Relegation Playoffs

=== Group 2 ===
Pos	Team	Pld	W	D	L	GF	GA	GD	Pts	Qualification
1	Monterrey	34	14	12	8	41	37	+4	40	Playoffs
2	Guadalajara	34	14	11	9	37	33	+4	39	Playoffs
3	Puebla	34	13	9	12	47	42	+5	35	
4	Atlante	34	13	9	12	30	28	+2	35	
5	Pachuca	34	10	13	11	38	46	−8	33	
6	UNAM	34	11	9	14	36	38	−2	31	
7	Toluca	34	11	9	14	46	51	−5	31	
8	Torreón	34	8	11	15	35	55	−20	27	Relegation Playoffs
9	Irapuato	34	2	12	20	26	50	−24	16	Relegation Playoffs

== Results ==
Home \ Away	AME	ATT	ATE	CRA	GDL	IRA	JAL	LAG	LEO	MTY	PAC	PUE	SNL	TOL	TOR	UNM	VER	ZAC
América		0–0	2–2	2–2	2–0	4–2	3–0	2–0	3–1	2–0	4–1	3–1	6–1	5–1	0–0	0–1	3–0	1–1
Atlante	1–2		0–1	0–2	0–1	1–0	2–0	1–0	1–1	1–0	0–1	2–0	2–0	2–1	2–0	1–0	0–0	2–1
Atlético Español	1–2	0–1		1–1	0–1	0–0	1–1	3–1	0–5	2–3	1–3	0–3	2–1	1–2	4–0	3–1	0–2	0–4
Cruz Azul	2–1	2–1	2–0		3–1	2–0	2–2	1–1	1–1	1–3	3–1	3–2	3–1	1–0	3–1	1–0	1–0	3–0
Guadalajara	1–3	1–1	5–3	0–2		2–0	0–0	1–0	1–0	0–0	2–2	0–0	0–0	3–1	0–1	2–1	1–0	2–0
Irapuato	1–3	0–0	4–4	2–3	0–0		1–1	0–2	1–1	0–2	1–1	3–1	2–3	2–2	0–0	0–1	0–0	0–0
Jalisco	4–3	2–1	3–0	2–1	0–2	2–0		0–1	2–3	1–1	2–2	3–1	0–1	2–1	1–0	3–1	1–0	3–0
Laguna	1–1	0–0	3–4	1–1	2–0	2–0	1–2		1–1	1–1	1–1	1–0	1–1	1–1	1–0	0–0	0–2	0–1
León	2–2	3–1	5–1	0–3	1–1	2–5	3–7	0–1		5–2	6–1	1–1	3–1	4–1	11–3	3–1	3–0	2–2
Monterrey	0–1	1–0	1–0	3–0	2–0	1–0	4–3	1–1	1–1		1–1	0–0	3–1	1–0	1–0	1–1	1–1	1–0
Pachuca	0–3	0–2	1–1	0–0	1–2	1–0	1–1	2–1	2–0	1–1		0–1	0–2	3–0	2–1	0–0	2–0	0–2
Puebla	3–0	0–0	1–2	1–2	1–0	2–1	1–1	1–1	3–1	0–0	2–1		1–2	3–1	4–1	0–3	4–2	2–0
San Luis	2–1	4–0	2–2	0–3	1–1	1–0	1–1	0–1	1–1	2–0	1–2	1–0		0–2	1–0	0–0	0–0	1–1
Toluca	1–2	1–0	3–2	2–1	1–2	1–0	2–1	2–2	0–0	4–0	1–3	0–1	1–1		2–0	0–0	5–2	2–0
Torreón	0–1	2–1	3–3	5–2	2–1	2–0	1–1	0–2	2–1	1–1	1–1	2–2	0–2	1–1		0–0	2–0	0–0
UNAM	0–1	0–2	3–1	1–3	0–1	1–0	1–2	0–0	4–3	2–1	1–1	4–1	3–2	2–2	0–1		3–1	1–0
Veracruz	3–2	2–2	1–2	1–3	2–2	0–0	4–2	2–0	1–1	2–3	0–0	1–1	4–2	1–1	3–2	1–0		2–2
Zacatepec	0–0	0–0	2–1	0–2	1–1	2–1	3–1	1–3	2–1	2–0	2–0	1–2	0–0	2–1	1–1	1–0	0–0	

Legend: Blue = home team win; Yellow = draw; Red = away team win.

== Relegation Playoffs ==
=== Bracket ===
Semifinals
15	Veracruz	3	0	3
18	Irapuato	1	0	1
16	Torreón	1	2	3
17	Atlético Español	1	3	4

Final
16	Torreón	1	1
18	Irapuato	0	0

=== Semifinals ===
25 June 1972

Torreón	1–1	Atlético Español
Gómez Orozco 8'		Rosete 87'

Estadio Moctezuma, Torreón
2 July 1972

Atlético Español	3–2	Torreón
Brandón 25', 44', 90'		Fragoso 61'; Gennoni 65'

Estadio Azteca, Mexico City

Atlético Español won 4-3 on aggregate

25 June 1972

Veracruz	3–1	Irapuato
Batata 42' (pen.); Álvarez 74'; Matta 84'		Rojas 78'

Estadio Veracruzano, Veracruz
9 July 1972

Irapuato	0–0	Veracruz

Estadio Irapuato, Irapuato

Veracruz won 3-1 on aggregate

=== Final ===
Torreón	1–0	Irapuato
Tarabini 5'

Estadio Jalisco, Guadalajara, Jalisco

Irapuato relegated to Segunda Division

== Championship Playoffs ==
=== Bracket ===
Semifinals
1	Cruz Azul	0	2	2
4	Guadalajara	1	0	1
2	América	1	1	3
3	Monterrey	0	2	1

Final
1	Cruz Azul	4	1
2	América	1	0

=== Semifinal ===
24 June 1972

Cruz Azul	0–1	Guadalajara
		Raúl Gómez 90'

Estadio Azteca, Mexico City

Guadalajara	0–2	Cruz Azul
		Fernando Bustos 74'; Octavio Muciño 83'

Estadio Jalisco, Guadalajara

Cruz Azul won 2-1 on aggregate

25 June 1972

América	1–0	Monterrey
Toninho 74'

Estadio Azteca, Mexico City

Monterrey	2–1	América
Barbosa 62'; Chagas 78' (pen.)		Ceballos 76'

Estadio Tecnológico, Monterrey

Aggregate tied. 3rd match will be played

América	3–1	Monterrey
Reinoso 60', 67'; Ceballos 87'		Guerra 45'

Estadio León, León, Guanajuato

America won 5-4 on aggregate

=== Final ===
August 9, 1972

Cruz Azul	4–1	América
Pulido 10'; Victorino 28'; Muciño 35', 46'	Report	Borja 89'

Estadio Azteca, Mexico City
Attendance: 100,000
Referee: Arturo Yamasaki

Cruz Azul	América

GK	1	(Argentina) Miguel Marín
DF	2	(Mexico) Marco Antonio Ramírez
DF	3	(Mexico) Javier Guzmán
DF	4	(Mexico) Alberto Quintano
DF	5	(Mexico) Javier Sánchez Galindo
MF	7	(Mexico) Héctor Pulido (c)
MF	6	(Mexico) Juan Manuel Alejándrez	(substituted off) 77'
MF	8	(Mexico) Cesáreo Victorino	(substituted off) 77'
FW	9	(Mexico) Fernando Bustos
FW	10	(Mexico) Octavio Muciño
FW	11	(Paraguay) Eladio Vera
Substitutes:
FW	12	(Mexico) Jesús Prado	(substituted on) 77'
FW	13	(Argentina) Alberto Gómez	(substituted on) 70'
Manager:
(Mexico) Raúl Cárdenas

GK	1	(Mexico) Prudencio Cortés
DF	2	(Mexico) René Trujillo
DF	3	(Mexico) Antonio Zamora
DF	4	(Mexico) Guillermo Hernández
DF	5	(Mexico) Fernando Santillán
MF	10	(Brazil) Toninho
MF	6	(Chile) Roberto Hodge	(substituted off) 46'
MF	8	(Chile) Carlos Reinoso
FW	7	(Mexico) Sergio Ceballos
FW	9	(Mexico) Enrique Borja (c)
LM	11	(Mexico) Juan Manuel Borbolla
Substitutes:
FW	14	(Mexico) Juan Manuel Herrero	(substituted off) 46'
Manager:
(Mexico) José Antonio Roca

1971–72 winners

3rd title

== Top scorers ==
Player	Nationality	Goals	Club
Enrique Borja	Mexico	26	América
Roberto Salomone	Argentina	17	León
Rafael Albrecht	Argentina	16	León
Batata	Mexico	16	Veracruz
Marcos Conigliaro	Argentina	15	Jalisco
Pedro Araya Toro	Chile	13	San Luis
Horacio López Salgado	Mexico	13	Cruz Azul
Alacrán Jiménez	Mexico	13	Monterrey
Héctor Veira	Argentina	13	Laguna
Fernando Bustos	Mexico	12	Cruz Azul
Octavio Muciño	Argentina	12	Cruz Azul
Benito Pardo	Spain	12	Atlético Español
