= 1970–71 Club América season =

Club América
1970–71 season
- Owner: Guillermo Cañedo de la Bárcena
- Manager: Luis Grill Prieto; José Antonio Roca
- Stadium: Estadio Azteca
- Primera División: Champions
- Copa México: Quarter-finals
- Campeón de Campeones: Runners-up
- Top goalscorer: Enrique Borja (20)
Home colours

The 1970–71 Club América season is the club's 33rd consecutive season in the top-flight of Mexican football. The team competed in the Liga MX, Copa México and the Campeón de Campeones, winning the Liga MX that season.

== Season summary ==
The 1970–71 season saw a radical shift in Mexican football. Initially, the club had a rough start throughout the few games under Argentine manager Luis Grill Prieto until he was sacked and replaced with José Antonio Roca who was already working with the Mexican Football Federation at the suggestion of Pedro Portilla to club president Guillermo Cañedo de la Bárcena. This season also saw Horacio López Salgado resume his position as a forward alongside Enrique Borja who was also the top goalscorer of the season with 20 goals scored. Finally, the season saw the signing of various foreign players as Brazilian midfielder Toninho and Chilean midfielder Roberto Hodge. With América winning the Primera División through the new final stage of the tournament, it would solidify its rivalry with Toluca.

== Squad ==
No.	Pos.	Nation	Player
—	GK	MEX	Amado Palacios
—	GK	MEX	Prudencio Cortés
—	DF	MEX	René Trujillo
—	DF	MEX	Fernando Santillán
—	DF	MEX	Antonio Zamora
—	DF	MEX	Guillermo Hernández
—	DF	MEX	Luis Miguel Barberena
—	DF	MEX	Luis Haneine
—	DF	MEX	Mario Pérez
—	DF	MEX	Fernando Cuenca
—	MF	CHI	Roberto Hodge
—	MF	CHI	Carlos Reinoso

No.	Pos.	Nation	Player
—	MF	BRA	Toninho
—	MF	MEX	Rubén Cárdenas
—	MF	MEX	Eduardo Del Mázo
—	FW	MEX	Monito Rodríguez
—	FW	MEX	Sergio Ceballos Aldape
—	FW	MEX	Enrique Borja
—	FW	MEX	Horacio López Salgado
—	FW	MEX	Juan Manuel Borbolla
—	FW	MEX	José Luis Rosete
—	FW	MEX	Gabriel Julián
—	FW	MEX	Francisco Macedo

== Match Results ==
=== Torneo Metropolitano ===
29 November 1970 1	América	2–0	Puebla	Azteca, Mexico City
		Report

6 December 1970 2	Pachuca	2–1	América	Revolución Mexicana, Pachuca
		Report

10 December 1970 3	América	2–1	Jalisco	Azteca, Mexico City
		Report

20 December 1970 4	Monterrey	2–1	América	Tecnológico, Monterrey
		Report

27 December 1970 5	América	2–4	Zacatepec	Azteca, Mexico City
		Report

3 January 1971 6	Atlante	3–1	América	Azteca, Mexico City
		Report

7 January 1971 7	América	2–0	Irapuato	Azteca, Mexico City
		Report

17 January 1971 8	Necaxa	1–0	América	Victoria, Aguascalientes
		Report

24 January 1971 9	América	2–1	Laguna	Azteca, Mexico City
		Report

31 January 1971 10	León	1–1	América	León, León de Los Aldama
		Report

4 February 1971 11	América	5–2	Guadalajara	Azteca, Mexico City
		Report

14 February 1971 12	Veracruz	0–0	América	Luis "Pirata" Fuente, Veracruz
		Report

21 February 1971 13	América	1–0	Toluca	Azteca, Mexico City
		Report

27 February 1971 14	Atlas	0–1	América	Jalisco, Guadalajara
		Report

7 March 1971 15	Cruz Azul	1–1	América	Ciudad de los Deportes, Mexico City
		Report

12 March 1971 16	América	0–0	Pumas UNAM	Azteca, Mexico City
		Report

18 March 1971 17	Torreón	1–1	América	Azteca, Mexico City
		Report

28 March 1971 18	Puebla	0–2	América	Cuauhtémoc, Puebla
		Report

1 April 1971 19	América	1–1	Pachuca	Azteca, Mexico City
		Report

7 April 1971 20	Jalisco	1–0	América	Jalisco, Guadalajara
		Report

18 April 1971 21	América	2–3	Monterrey	Azteca, Mexico City
		Report

25 April 1971 22	Zacatepec	1–1	América	Estadio Agustín Coruco Díaz, Zacatepec
		Report

29 April 1971 23	América	2–0	Atlante	Azteca, Mexico City
		Report

9 May 1971 24	Irapuato	1–2	América	Sergio León Chávez, Irapuato
		Report

16 May 1971 25	América	2–1	Necaxa	Azteca, Mexico City
		Report

23 May 1971 26	Laguna	0–2	América	San Isidro, Torreón
		Report

27 May 1971 27	América	1–1	León	Azteca, Mexico City
		Report

5 June 1971 28	Guadalajara	1–2	América	Jalisco, Guadalajara
		Report

13 June 1971 29	América	4–1	Veracruz	Azteca, Mexico City
		Report

20 June 1971 30	Toluca	0–0	América	Nemesio Díez, Toluca
		Report

24 June 1971 31	América	2–1	Atlas	Azteca, Mexico City

4 July 1971 32	América	3–0	Cruz Azul	Azteca, Mexico City

8 July 1971 33	Pumas UNAM	2–2	América	Olímpico Universitario, Mexico City
		Report

15 July 1971 34	América	5–0	Torreón	Azteca, Mexico City
		Report

25 July 1971 Final – First leg	Toluca	0–0	América	Nemesio Díez, Toluca
		Report

1 August 1971 Final – Second leg	América	2–0	Toluca	Azteca, Mexico City
	Reinoso 13'; López Salgado 75'	Report		Attendance: 105,000+ Referee: Abel Aguilar

=== Copa México ===
==== Round of 16 ====
9 September 1971 Round of 16	América	2–0	Veracruz	Azteca, Mexico City
		Report

16 September 1971 Round of 16	Veracruz	1–3	América	Luis "Pirata" Fuente, Veracruz
		Report

26 September 1971 Semi-finals	América	1–2	Cruz Azul	Azteca, Mexico City
		Report

=== Campeón de Campeones ===
24 October 1971	América	0–1	León	Azteca, Mexico City
		Report	Estrada 74'
