= 1970–71 Mexican Primera División season =

29th professional season of the top-flight football league in Mexico

Primera División de México
- Season: 1970–71
- Champions: América (2nd title)
- Relegated: Atlas
- Champions' Cup: América; Toluca
- Matches: 311
- Goals: 717 (2.31 per match)

Statistics of the Primera División de México for the 1970–71 season.

== Overview ==
Zacatepec was promoted to Primera División (Segunda División 1969–70 Champion)

Puebla was also promoted to Primera División (winner of promotional tournament between Unión de Curtidores, Nacional and Naucalpan) to increase the number of teams to 18.

The season was contested by 18 teams, and America won the championship.

Atlas was relegated to Segunda División.

After this season Necaxa was sold and changed its name to Atlético Español.

Cruz Azul moves to Mexico City.

=== Teams ===
Location of the 1970-71 Primera División teams

Team	City	Stadium
América	Mexico City	Azteca
Atlante	Mexico City	Azteca
Atlas	Guadalajara, Jalisco	Jalisco
Cruz Azul	Jasso, Hidalgo	10 de Diciembre
Guadalajara	Guadalajara, Jalisco	Jalisco
Irapuato	Irapuato, Guanajuato	Irapuato
Jalisco	Guadalajara, Jalisco	Jalisco
Laguna	Torreón, Coahuila	San Isidro
León	León, Guanajuato	León
Monterrey	Monterrey, Nuevo León	Tecnológico
Necaxa	Mexico City	Azteca
Pachuca	Pachuca, Hidalgo	Revolución Mexicana
Puebla	Puebla, Puebla	Cuauhtémoc
Toluca	Toluca, State of Mexico	Toluca 70
Torreón	Torreón, Coahuila	Moctezuma
UNAM	Mexico City	Olímpico Universitario
Veracruz	Veracruz, Veracruz	Veracruzano
Zacatepec	Zacatepec, Morelos	Agustín "Coruco" Díaz

== Group stage ==
=== Group 1 ===
Pos	Team	Pld	W	D	L	GF	GA	GD	Pts	Qualification
1	Toluca	34	14	15	5	38	21	+17	43	Playoff
2	Jalisco	34	12	14	8	35	29	+6	38	
3	Zacatepec	34	14	10	10	39	37	+2	38	
4	Cruz Azul	34	11	15	8	39	39	0	37	
5	UNAM	34	10	15	9	43	38	+5	35	
6	Necaxa	34	10	11	13	44	39	+5	31	
7	Irapuato	34	8	13	13	34	53	−19	29	
8	Laguna	34	10	8	16	37	47	−10	28	
9	Atlas	34	5	12	17	32	48	−16	22	Relegation Playoff

=== Group 2 ===
Pos	Team	Pld	W	D	L	GF	GA	GD	Pts	Qualification
1	América	34	17	10	7	56	33	+23	44	Playoff
2	Monterrey	34	15	10	9	46	37	+9	40	
3	León	34	14	10	10	50	41	+9	38	
4	Atlante	34	9	16	9	33	31	+2	34	
5	Veracruz	34	12	9	13	39	40	−1	33	
6	Puebla	34	11	10	13	43	49	−6	32	
7	Torreón	34	11	9	14	27	35	−8	31	
8	Guadalajara	34	11	8	15	34	44	−10	30	
9	Pachuca	34	11	7	16	38	46	−8	29	Relegation Playoff

== Results ==
Home \ Away	AME	ATT	ATL	CRA	GDL	IRA	JAL	LAG	LEO	MTY	NEC	PAC	PUE	TOL	TOR	UNI	VER	ZAC
América		2–0	2–1	3–0	5–2	2–0	2–1	2–1	1–1	2–3	2–1	1–1	2–0	1–0	5–0	0–0	4–1	2–4
Atlante	3–1		0–0	0–0	3–0	0–0	1–2	1–2	1–1	1–1	1–1	1–0	1–2	0–0	1–0	2–2	2–2	2–1
Atlas	0–1	0–1		2–2	1–2	1–1	0–1	1–0	2–1	2–1	1–1	2–3	2–4	1–1	0–0	2–3	0–0	1–1
Cruz Azul	1–1	0–0	1–1		2–1	0–1	0–0	1–0	0–1	1–1	0–4	1–0	4–1	0–0	3–1	1–1	0–2	0–0
Guadalajara	1–2	0–0	2–1	1–1		2–0	0–1	1–0	1–2	1–0	1–3	0–0	0–0	0–0	1–0	1–1	0–1	1–2
Irapuato	1–2	2–2	1–0	4–4	3–2		1–0	1–1	1–1	1–3	0–0	2–1	3–3	1–3	0–0	2–1	2–0	0–0
Jalisco	1–0	1–1	0–3	1–1	2–0	0–0		5–1	0–0	2–0	0–0	1–0	1–1	1–0	0–1	3–1	2–1	1–1
Laguna	0–2	2–2	4–1	2–2	1–2	2–0	0–0		2–0	0–1	0–0	3–1	3–1	0–1	1–0	1–1	1–0	3–1
León	1–1	1–2	3–2	1–4	1–2	2–2	1–1	4–0		0–0	0–3	5–1	4–1	2–0	3–0	2–0	2–1	2–1
Monterrey	2–1	1–0	0–1	0–2	3–2	1–0	0–0	1–0	4–1		1–1	0–2	2–0	1–1	2–0	1–1	4–1	4–0
Necaxa	1–0	1–0	3–1	1–1	1–3	7–0	0–2	1–1	0–2	2–2		2–1	1–3	0–2	0–0	1–3	2–0	0–1
Pachuca	2–1	1–0	0–0	3–1	0–1	1–2	1–1	4–1	2–1	4–0	0–3		1–1	0–0	1–0	1–2	2–2	1–0
Puebla	0–2	0–0	2–0	2–0	0–1	3–2	2–0	1–1	0–1	2–0	2–1	3–1		3–0	1–2	1–1	1–1	1–1
Toluca	0–0	2–0	0–0	0–1	3–0	4–1	1–1	3–2	2–0	1–1	2–0	1–0	1–1		3–0	2–1	1–0	1–0
Torreón	1–1	1–0	2–1	0–1	1–1	1–0	0–1	3–0	1–1	1–2	2–0	3–1	2–0	0–0		2–0	1–1	1–0
UNAM	2–2	1–1	0–0	2–0	1–0	0–0	3–0	1–0	1–1	2–2	2–2	0–1	3–0	2–2	1–0		3–0	0–1
Veracruz	0–0	0–1	4–2	1–2	1–0	1–0	3–2	1–0	0–1	0–1	2–1	4–1	3–0	1–1	0–0	3–1		2–0
Zacatepec	1–1	1–3	1–0	1–2	2–2	3–0	2–2	2–1	2–1	2–1	1–0	1–0	2–1	0–0	3–1	1–0	0–0	

Legend: Blue = home team win; Yellow = draw; Red = away team win.

== Relegation Playoffs ==
25 July 1971

Pachuca	2-2	Atlas
Juan Manuel Medina 37'; Moacyr dos Santos 82'		Javier Bazán 32' (own); Ricardo Chavarín 57'

Estadio Revolución Mexicana, Pachuca
31 July 1971

Atlas	1–1	Pachuca
Magdaleno Mercado 77'		Jorge Rodríguez 49'

Estadio Jalisco, Guadalajara

Aggregate score tied so a 3rd match will be played

3 August 1971

Pachuca	2-0	Atlas
Alfonso Madrigal 15'; Césareo Acosta 75'

Estadio León, León, Guanajuato

Pachuca won on aggregate 5-3. Atlas was relegated to Segunda Division

== Final ==
=== First Leg ===
Toluca	0–0	América

Nemesio Diez, Toluca
Referee: Alfonso González Archundia

Toluca	América

GK	1	(Mexico) Roberto Silva
RB	2	(Mexico) José Vantolrá
LB	3	(Mexico) Carlos Zavala
CM	4	(Mexico) Eduardo Ramos
CB	5	(Mexico) Aurelio Hernández
CB	6	(Mexico) Luis Regueiro
RM	7	(Mexico) Jesús Romero Reyes
CM	8	(Mexico) Moisés Figueroa
CF	9	(Uruguay) Sergio Silva
CF	10	(Mexico) Vicente Pereda
LM	11	(Mexico) José Antonio Pérez	(substituted off) 31'
Substitutes:
FW	12	(Mexico) Albino Morales	(substituted on) 31' (substituted off) 70'
FW	13	(Uruguay) Hugo Esquivel	(substituted on) 70'
Manager:
(Mexico) Ignacio Trelles

GK	1	(Mexico) Prudencio Cortés
DF	2	(Mexico) René Trujillo
DF	3	(Mexico) Antonio Zamora
DF	4	(Mexico) Guillermo Hernández
DF	5	(Mexico) Mario Pérez
MF	6	(Chile) Roberto Hodge
MF	7	(Chile) Carlos Reinoso
MF	8	(Brazil) Toninho
FW	9	(Mexico) Monito Rodríguez
FW	10	(Mexico) Enrique Borja	(substituted off) 75'
LM	11	(Mexico) Juan Manuel Borbolla
Substitutes:
FW	12	(Mexico) Horacio López Salgado	(substituted on) 75'
Manager:
(Mexico) José Antonio Roca

=== Second Leg ===
August 1, 1971
12:00

América	2–0	Toluca
Carlos Reinoso 13'; Horacio López Salgado 75'

Estadio Azteca, Mexico City
Attendance: 105,000+
Referee: Abel Aguilar

América	Toluca

GK	1	(Mexico) Prudencio Cortés
DF	2	(Mexico) René Trujillo
DF	3	(Mexico) Antonio Zamora
DF	4	(Mexico) Guillermo Hernández
DF	5	(Mexico) Mario Pérez
MF	6	(Chile) Roberto Hodge
MF	7	(Chile) Carlos Reinoso
MF	8	(Brazil) Toninho
FW	9	(Mexico) Monito Rodríguez
FW	10	(Mexico) Enrique Borja	(substituted off) 46'
LM	11	(Mexico) Juan Manuel Borbolla
Substitutes:
FW	12	(Mexico) Horacio López Salgado	(substituted on) 46'
Manager:
(Mexico) José Antonio Roca

GK	1	(Mexico) Roberto Silva
RB	2	(Mexico) José Vantolrá
LB	3	(Mexico) Carlos Zavala
CM	4	(Mexico) Eduardo Ramos
CB	5	(Mexico) Aurelio Hernández
CB	6	(Mexico) Luis Regueiro
RM	7	(Mexico) Jesús Romero Reyes	(substituted off) 46'
CM	8	(Mexico) Moisés Figueroa
CF	9	(Mexico) Albino Morales
CF	10	(Mexico) Ricardo Montalbán
LM	11	(Mexico) Vicente Pereda
Substitutes:
FW	12	(Spain) Julio Alas	(substituted on) 46'
Manager:
(Mexico) Ignacio Trelles

America won on aggregate 2-0

1970–71 winners

2nd title

== Top scorers ==
Player	Nationality	Goals	Club
Enrique Borja	Mexico	20	América
Octavio Muciño	Mexico	19	Cruz Azul
Alacrán Jiménez	Mexico	18	Monterrey
Luis Montoya	Mexico	18	Necaxa
Mario Velarde	Mexico	14	Pumas UNAM
Juan José Valiente	Argentina	12	León
Jesús Romero Reyes	Mexico	12	Toluca
Ubirajara Chagas	Brazil	12	Monterrey
Benito Pardo	Spain	12	Puebla
Batata	Brazil	10	Veracruz
Juan Carlos Carone	Argentina	10	Veracruz
Ramón Cruz Zárate	Mexico	10	Irapuato
