= 1974 Campeón de Campeones =

Football match in Mexico City

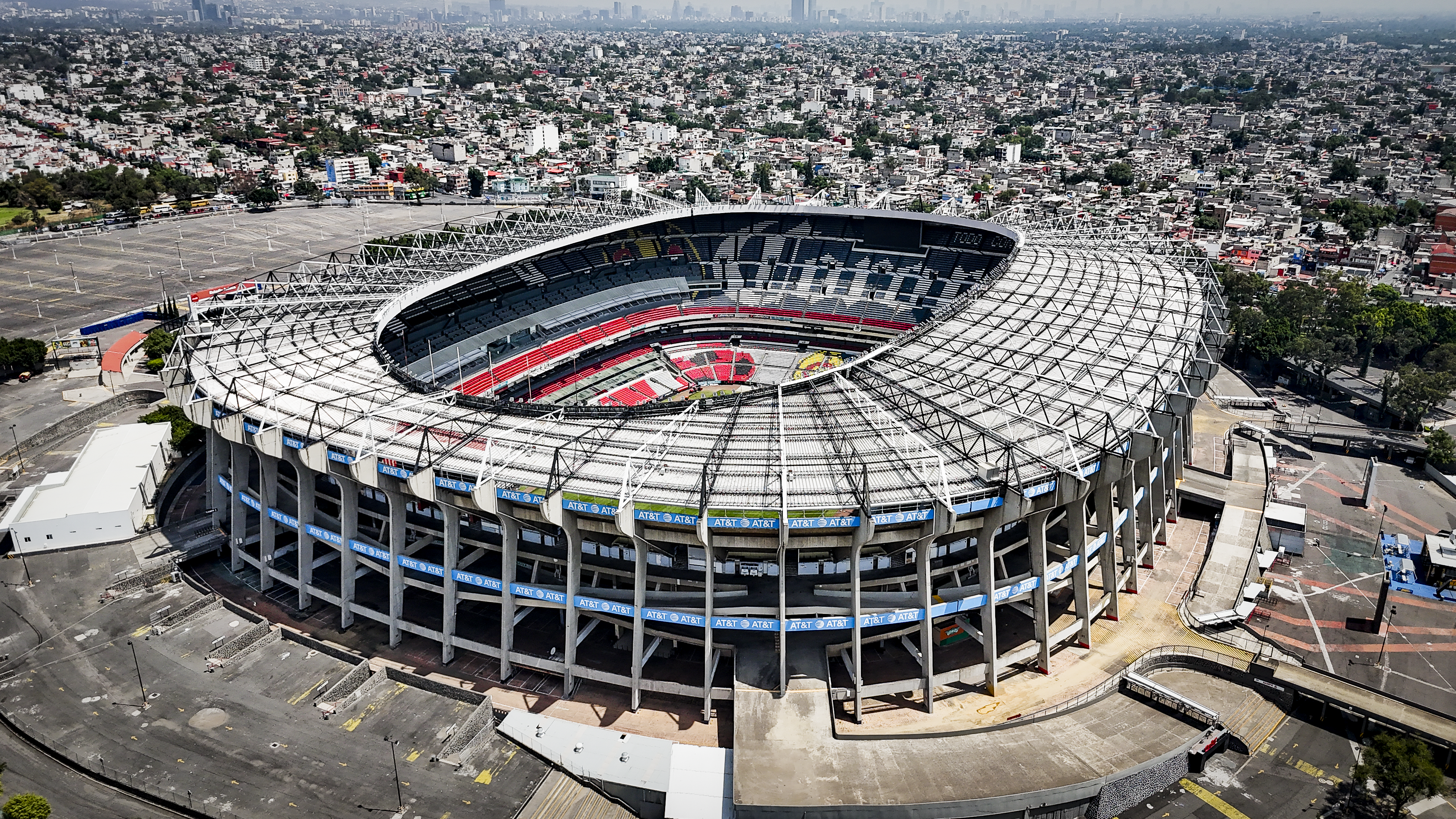
- Estadio Azteca hosted the match.
Cruz Azul	América
2	1
- Date: 26 May 1974
- Venue: Estadio Azteca, Mexico City
- Referee: Enrique Mendoza Guillén
- Attendance: 110,000

The 1974 Campeón de Campeones was the 32nd edition of the Campeón de Campeones, an annual football super cup match. (Note: The edition number was calculated based on figures provided by Goal.com, with the first Campeón de Campeones having been held in 1941–42.) The match-up featured Cruz Azul, the winners of the 1973–74 Mexican Primera División, and América, the winners of the 1973–74 Copa México. It was played at the Estadio Azteca, Mexico City, on 26 May 1974.

Cruz Azul won the match 2–1 to secure their second Campeón de Campeones title.

== Match details ==
26 May 1974

Cruz Azul	2–1	América
Ocampos 55'; Vera 80'	Report	Ceballos 20'

Estadio Azteca, Mexico City
Attendance: 110,000
Referee: Enrique Mendoza Guillén

=== Details ===
Cruz Azul	América

GK	1	(Argentina) Miguel Marín
DF	2	(Mexico) Ignacio Flores
DF	3	(Mexico) Javier Guzmán
DF	16	(Mexico) Pedro Velázquez
DF	5	(Mexico) Javier Sánchez
MF	6	(Mexico) Héctor Pulido	(substituted off) 7'
MF	7	(Mexico) Joel Andrade
MF	8	(Argentina) Alberto Gómez
FW	9	(Mexico) Fernando Bustos
FW	14	(Mexico) Luis Estrada
FW	11	(Paraguay) Eladio Vera
Substitutions:
MF	15	(Paraguay) Juan Ocampos	(substituted on) 7'
Manager:
(Mexico) Raúl Cárdenas

GK	1	(Mexico) Prudencio Cortés
DF	2	(Mexico) René Trujillo
DF	3	(Mexico) Alfredo Tena
DF	4	(Mexico) Guillermo Hernández
DF	5	(Mexico) Mario Pérez
MF	6	(Mexico) Alberto Ojeda
MF	7	(Mexico) Sergio Ceballos
MF	8	(Chile) Carlos Reinoso
FW	9	(Mexico) Juan Borbolla
FW	10	(Uruguay) Gustavo León
FW	11	(Chile) Osvaldo Castro
Manager:
(Mexico) José Antonio Roca
