= 1973 CONCACAF Championship qualification =

Football competition

Tournament details
- Dates: 15 April – 10 December 1972
- Teams: 14 (from 1 confederation)

Tournament statistics
- Matches played: 18
- Goals scored: 73 (4.06 per match)

The 1973 CONCACAF Championship qualification competition was the qualifying contest to decide the finalists for the 1973 CONCACAF Championship – the sixth international association football championship for members of the Confederation of North, Central America and Caribbean Association Football (CONCACAF). Qualifying ran from 15 April – 10 December 1972 and was contested by the national teams of 14 CONCACAF member associations. For the first time, the competition doubled as the qualification competition for the FIFA World Cup.

Unlike previous editions, no teams qualified automatically. Six teams – Mexico, Guatemala, Honduras, the Netherlands Antilles, Haiti and Trinidad and Tobago – qualified for the final tournament.

== Background ==
The Confederation of North, Central America and Caribbean Association Football (CONCACAF) was founded as a merger of the Confederación Centroamericana y del Caribe de Fútbol (CCCF) and North American Football Confederation (NAFC) in 1961. The first CONCACAF Championship, in which all the competing nations qualified automatically, was held in 1963. A qualifying competition was introduced from the second edition in 1965. Starting from the 1973 edition, the competition doubled as the qualifying competition for the FIFA World Cup for teams in North, Central America and the Caribbean. Only the winner of each edition would qualify for the World Cup.

== Format ==
Qualification for the 1973 CONCACAF Championship was split into six groups of either two or three teams. The four groups of two teams would contest a two-legged tie, in which the team scoring more goals on aggregate in each tie would qualify for the final tournament. The two groups of three would contest a double round-robin where each team would play all of the others twice. The winners would qualify for the final tournament.

=== Participants ===
- Antigua and Barbuda
- Canada
- Costa Rica
- El Salvador
- Guatemala
- Haiti
- Honduras
- Jamaica
- Mexico
- Netherlands Antilles
- Puerto Rico
- Suriname
- Trinidad and Tobago
- United States

== Group A ==
The group began on 20 August when Canada defeated the United States 3–2. Four days later, Mexico recorded a 1–0 win against Canada in their first match. On 29 August, the United States drew 2–2 with Canada. As a result, with half the matches played, Canada led the group on three points, one ahead of Mexico who still had three matches left to play.

On 3 September, Mexico went top of the group with a 3–1 win against the United States. Four days later, they followed that up with a 2–1 win against Canada – a result which meant Mexico had won the group and had qualified for the final tournament. In the final match, on 10 September, Mexico completed a clean sweep, winning all their games, after beating the United States 2–1.

=== Table ===
Pos	Team	Pld	W	D	L	GF	GA	GD	Pts	Qualification
1	Mexico	4	4	0	0	8	3	+5	8	Qualification for 1973 CONCACAF Championship
2	Canada	4	1	1	2	6	7	−1	3	
3	United States	4	0	1	3	6	10	−4	1	

=== Results ===
20 August 1972

Canada	3–2	United States
Parsons 5'; Twamley 41'; Johnson 63'		Roy 65'; Getzinger 88'

King George V Park, St. John's
Attendance: 7,600
Referee: Parsons (Bermuda)

24 August 1972

Canada	0–1	Mexico
		Borbolla 61'

Varsity Stadium, Toronto
Attendance: 14,000
Referee: Chaplin (Jamaica)

29 August 1972

United States	2–2	Canada
Roy 14'; Geimer 25'		MacKay 9'; Douglas 81'

Memorial Stadium, Baltimore, United States
Attendance: 3,273
Referee: Henriquez (El Salvador)

3 September 1972

Mexico	3–1	United States
Victorino 14'; Bustos 48'; Borja 60'		Roy 78'

Estadio Azteca, Mexico City, Mexico
Attendance: 29,891
Referee: De Gourville (Trinidad and Tobago)

6 September 1972

Mexico	2–1	Canada
Victorino 2'; Bustos 46'		Robinson 40'

Estadio Azteca, Mexico City, Mexico
Attendance: 30,000
Referee: Koetsier (Netherlands Antilles)

10 September 1972

United States	1–2	Mexico
Geimer 8'		Ceballos 11'; Borbolla 48'

Memorial Coliseum, Los Angeles, United States
Attendance: 9,620
Referee: Soto Paris (Costa Rica)

== Group B ==
The first leg was held on 3 December when Guatemala defeated El Salvador 1–0. A week later, Guatemala won the second leg against El Salvador by the same score line to qualify for the final tournament 2–0 on aggregate.

Group B
Team 1	Agg.	Team 2	1st leg	2nd leg
Guatemala	2–0	El Salvador	1–0	1–0

=== Results ===
3 December 1972

Guatemala	1–0	El Salvador
Melgar 89' (pen.)

Estadio Doroteo Guamuch Flores, Guatemala City
Attendance: 39,008
Referee: Pageotte (Haiti)
10 December 1972

El Salvador	0–1	Guatemala
		Melgar 65'

Estadio Nacional Flor Blanca, San Salvador
Attendance: 24,828
Referee: Kibritpan (United States)

Guatemala won 2–0 on aggregate.

== Group C ==
The first leg was held on 3 December when Honduras defeated Costa Rica 2–1. A week later, Honduras drew the second leg against Costa Rica 3–3 to qualify for the final tournament 5–4 on aggregate.

Group C
Team 1	Agg.	Team 2	1st leg	2nd leg
Honduras	5–4	Costa Rica	2–1	3–3

=== Results ===
3 December 1972

Honduras	2–1	Costa Rica
Bran 32'; Gómez 57'		Paniagua 40'

Estadio Nacional Chelato Uclés, Tegucigalpa
Attendance: 16,727
Referee: Archundia (Mexico)
10 December 1972

Costa Rica	3–3	Honduras
Elizondo 8'; Sáenz 50'; Cárcamo 60' (pen.)		Urquía 70'; Gómez 85', 90'

Estadio Ricardo Saprissa, San Juan
Attendance: 14,274
Referee: Ramirez (Puerto Rico)

Honduras won 5–4 on aggregate.

== Group D ==
Jamaica withdrew and the Netherlands Antilles were given a walkover to the final tournament.

Group D
Team 1	Agg.	Team 2	1st leg	2nd leg
Jamaica	w/o (Note: El Jamaica withdrew.)	Netherlands Antilles	—	—

== Group E ==
The first leg was held on 15 April when a hat-trick from Emmanuel Sanon helped Haiti to a 7–0 win against Puerto Rico. Eight days later, Sanon again scored a hat-trick as Haiti won the second leg against Puerto Rico 5–0 to qualify for the final tournament 12–0 on aggregate.

Group E
Team 1	Agg.	Team 2	1st leg	2nd leg
Haiti	12–0	Puerto Rico	7–0	5–0

=== Results ===
15 April 1972

Haiti	7–0	Puerto Rico
Barthélemy 11'; Désir 14'; François 21'; Sanon 30', 33', 67'; Vorbe 73'

Stade Sylvio Cator, Port-au-Prince
Attendance: 2,152
Referee: Archundia (Mexico)
23 April 1972

Puerto Rico	0–5	Haiti
		Bayonne 22'; Désir 39'; Sanon 48', 73', 80'

Estadio Sixto Escobar, San Juan
Attendance: 1,592
Referee: Canessa (Guatemala)

Haiti won 12–0 on aggregate.

== Group F ==
The group began on 10 November when Sammy Llewellyn and Steve David both scored hat-tricks as Trinidad and Tobago defeated Antigua and Barbuda 11–1. Nine days later, Trinidad and Tobago defeated Antigua and Barbuda 2–1. On 28 November Trinidad and Tobago defeated Suriname 2–1 which meant, after half the matches had been played, Trinidad and Tobago were top of the group with six points, six ahead of both Suriname and Antigua and Barbuda.

Two days later, in their final match, Trinidad and Tobago drew 1–1 with Suriname to qualify for the final tournament. On 3 December, Suriname defeated Antigua and Barbuda 6–0. Two days later, the group was completed when Suriname defeated Antigua and Barbuda 3–1.

=== Table ===
Pos	Team	Pld	W	D	L	GF	GA	GD	Pts	Qualification
1	Trinidad and Tobago	4	3	1	0	16	4	+12	7	Qualification for 1973 CONCACAF Championship
2	Suriname	4	2	1	1	11	4	+7	5	
3	Antigua and Barbuda	4	0	0	4	3	22	−19	0	

=== Results ===
10 November 1972

Trinidad and Tobago	11–1	Antigua and Barbuda
Llewellyn 19', 38', 44'; David 42', 70', 79'; Spann 49', 68'; Brewster 59'; Roberts 84', 89'		Morris 20'

Queen's Park Oval, Port of Spain
Attendance: 6,510
Referee: Alvarez Alfaro (Nicaragua)

19 November 1972

Antigua and Barbuda	1–2	Trinidad and Tobago
Edwards 80'		Llewellyn 10'; David 30'

Antigua Recreation Ground, St. John's
Attendance: 2,750
Referee: Ortiz Perez (Honduras)

28 November 1972

Trinidad and Tobago	2–1	Suriname
Brewster 63'; Roberts 68'		Zebeda 87' (pen.)

Queen's Park Oval, Port of Spain
Attendance: 7,964
Referee: Landauer (United States)

30 November 1972

Suriname	1–1	Trinidad and Tobago
Zebeda 35'		David 75'

Skinner Park, San Fernando, Trinidad and Tobago (Note: Suriname played their home matches in San Fernando, Trinidad and Tobago and St. John's, Antigua and Barbuda.)
Attendance: 9,276
Referee: Landauer (United States)

3 December 1972

Antigua and Barbuda	0–6	Suriname
		Doesburg 2'; Schal 2'; Miller 2'

Antigua Recreation Ground, St. John's
Attendance: 2,027
Referee: Amarica (Canada)

5 December 1972

Suriname	3–1	Antigua and Barbuda
Zebeda 24', 68'; Sordam 41'		Morris 33'

Antigua Recreation Ground, St. John's, Antigua and Barbuda
Attendance: 1,003
Referee: Amarica (Canada)

== Goalscorers ==
There were 73 goals scored in 18 matches, for an average of 4.06 goals per match.

6 goals

- (Haiti) Emmanuel Sanon

5 goals

- (Trinidad and Tobago) Steve David

4 goals

- (Suriname (Kingdom of the Netherlands)) Arnold Robert Zebeda
- (Trinidad and Tobago) Sammy Llewellyn

3 goals

- (Honduras) Rigoberto Gómez
- (Trinidad and Tobago) Raymond Roberts
- (United States) Willy Roy

2 goals

- (Antigua and Barbuda) Patrick Morris
- (Guatemala) Nelson Melgar
- (Haiti) Jean-Claude Désir
- (Mexico) Juan Manuel Borbolla
- (Mexico) Fernando Bustos
- (Mexico) Cesário Victorino
- (Suriname (Kingdom of the Netherlands)) Armand Doesburg
- (Suriname (Kingdom of the Netherlands)) Arnold Miller
- (Suriname (Kingdom of the Netherlands)) Edwin Schal
- (Trinidad and Tobago) Leo Brewster
- (Trinidad and Tobago) Leroy Spann
- (United States) Gene Geimer

1 goal

- (Antigua and Barbuda) Vernon Edwards
- (Canada) Jimmy Douglas
- (Canada) Glen Johnson
- (Canada) Ike MacKay
- (Canada) Buzz Parsons
- (Canada) Brian Robinson
- (Canada) Bruce Twamley
- (Costa Rica) Nemesia Cárcamo
- (Costa Rica) Wálter Elizondo
- (Costa Rica) Asdrúbal Paniagua
- (Costa Rica) Roy Sáenz
- (Haiti) Claude Barthélemy
- (Haiti) Pierre Bayonne
- (Haiti) Guy François
- (Haiti) Philippe Vorbe
- (Honduras) Jorge Bran
- (Honduras) Jorge Urquía
- (Mexico) Enrique Borja
- (Mexico) Sergio Ceballos Aldape
- (Suriname (Kingdom of the Netherlands)) Eugene Sordam
- (United States) Rudy Getzinger
