= Toninho (footballer, born 1949) =

Brazilian footballer (born 1949)

Personal information
- Full name: Antonio Martins dos Santos
- Date of birth: 28 January 1949 (age 77)
- Place of birth: São Paulo, São Paulo, Brazil
- Position: Midfielder

Youth career
- Municipal

Senior career*
Years	Team	Apps	(Gls)
1968–1969	Sonsonate		
1969–1970	Municipal		
1970–1973	América		
1973–1974	Belenenses		
- * Club domestic league appearances and goals

Antonio Martins dos Santos (born 28 January 1949), more commonly known as simply Toninho or Antonio Martins is a Brazilian former footballer. He primarily played abroad in his career, notably for Municipal in Guatemala and América in Mexico where he achieved success with both clubs.

== Career ==
Toninho began his career within the youth sector of Municipal in Guatemala. Despite briefly playing for Sonsonate in El Salvador for the second half of the 1967–68 Primera División de Fútbol Profesional, he returned to Municipal to participate in the 1969–70 Guatemalan Liga Nacional where he was a part of the winning squad that season. This success would attract the attention of América which was currently looking for foreign players to sign for the club. Following his signing, he was assigned to the midfield of the club's starting XI where he was part of the club's attacking midfield composition alongside other players such as Roberto Hodge, Carlos Reinoso, Juan Manuel Borbolla and Roberto Rodríguez Pérez. The 1970–71 season would see the club obtain their second title through defeating Toluca in the final. He continued playing for the Águilas until the 1972–73 season season as he played abroad in Portugal for Belenenses in the 1973–74 Primeira Divisão.

== Personal life ==
Toninho's son, Antonio Martins Jr. was involved in an América youth football academy scam through the use of his father's name alongside several former América players such as Cesilio de los Santos, Israel Martínez and Isaac Terrazas.
