= Sergio Ceballos =

Sergio Ceballos may refer to:

- Sergio Ceballos (footballer, born 1950), Mexican football forward
- Sergio Ceballos (footballer, born 1994), Mexican football midfielder

== See also ==
- Sergio Zeballos (born 1987), Bolivian football manager
