= Horacio López Salgado =

Mexican footballer (born 1948)

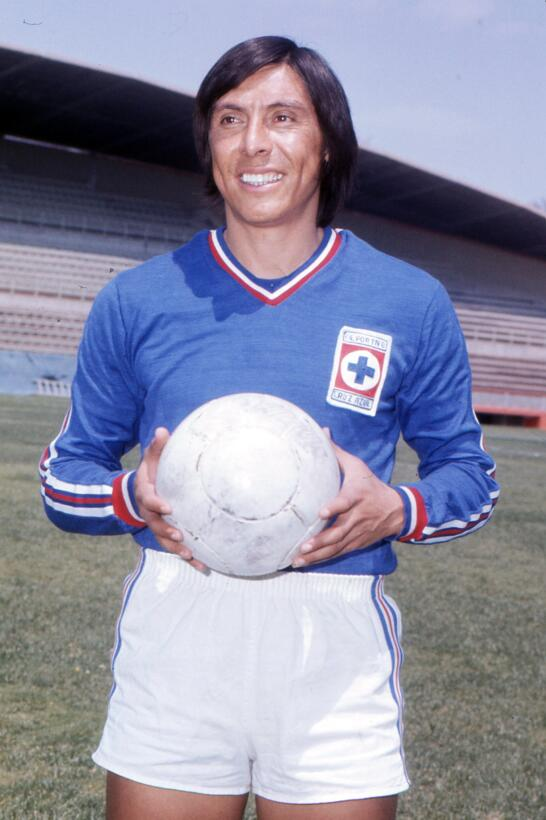

Personal information
- Full name: Horacio José López Salgado
- Date of birth: 15 September 1948 (age 78)
- Place of birth: Taxco, Mexico
- Height: 1.68 m (5 ft 6 in)
- Position: Forward

Senior career*
Years	Team	Apps	(Gls)
1967–1971	América		
1971–1982	Cruz Azul		
1982–1983	Necaxa		

International career
1968–1980	Mexico	50	(13)
- * Club domestic league appearances and goals

Horacio José López Salgado (born 15 September 1948) is a Mexican former footballer who played as forward. He played for most of his career with Cruz Azul, where he established himself as the club's all-time leading scorer, a distinction he retained for nearly two decades. Furthermore, he won five Primera División league titles, one international CONCACAF Champions Cup, and one Campeón de Campeones super cup.

== Club career ==
López Salgado was born in Taxco, Guerrero, Mexico. He made his professional debut for Club América.

He played for most of his career in Cruz Azul, where he won five Liga MX league titles, one CONCACAF Champions Cup, and one Campeón de Campeones.

== International Career ==
At the international level, López Salgado earned 50 caps for Mexico and scored 13 goals over a twelve-year career with the national team. He represented Mexico at the 1970 FIFA World Cup on home soil.

== Honours ==
América

- Mexican Primera División: 1970–71

Cruz Azul

- Mexican Primera División: 1971–72, 1972–73, 1973–74, 1978–79, 1979–80
- Campeón de Campeones: 1974
- CONCACAF Champions' Cup: 1971

Individual

- Mexican Primera División Top Scorer: 1974–75
