= Miguel Marín (Argentine footballer) =

Argentine footballer and coach

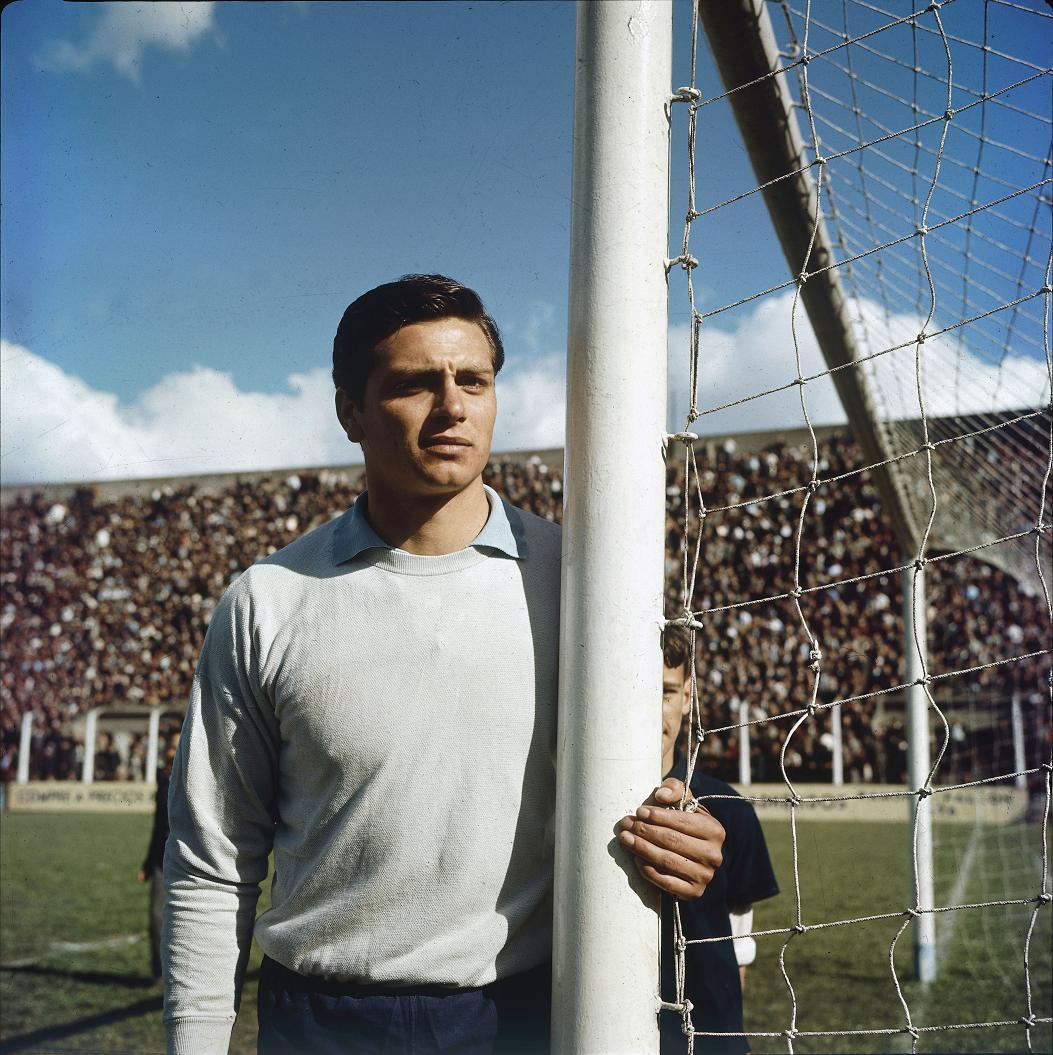
- Marin in 1968

Personal information
- Full name: José Miguel Marín Ocotto
- Date of birth: 15 March 1945
- Place of birth: Río Tercero, Córdoba, Argentina
- Date of death: 30 December 1991 (aged 46)
- Place of death: Querétaro, Mexico
- Height: 1.81 m (5 ft 11 1/2 in)
- Position: Goalkeeper

Senior career*
Years	Team	Apps	(Gls)
1964–1971	Vélez Sarsfield	222	(0)
1971–1981	Cruz Azul	309	(0)
Total		531	(0)

International career
1971	Argentina	2	(0)
- * Club domestic league appearances and goals

José Miguel Marín Ocotto (15 March 1945 – 30 December 1991) was an Argentine footballer who played as a goalkeeper and as a football coach. He started his career in Club Atlético Vélez Sarsfield, and became champion with this Argentine team. He then became a Mexican football star with Cruz Azul, where he won several championships and became an iconic player. He is widely regarded as one of the best international goalkeepers to play in Mexico.

== Early life ==
Born on May 15, 1945, in Río Tercero, Córdoba, Marín was of a modest family. He grew up working in the greengrocery stores of his neighborhood. Marín would play in the pastures and use the frame of the trees as goals. This caught the attention of a boss at work who subsequently took him to Buenos Aires for a trial at Vélez Sarsfield. Despite conceding eight goals, Victorio Spinetto accepted him into the institution and was enrolled into the club's youth team at 14. Marín was notably disciplined. He devoted himself to train his physical and technical skills twice a day.

== Career ==
Marín began his career with Vélez Sarsfield. He joined Cruz Azul in 1971, making his league debut at Guadalajara on 26 December 1971. Marín played for Cruz Azul until he retired in 1980, appearing in 309 Mexican Primera División matches. Marin won five league championships with Cruz Azul.

Marín was selected in the Argentina national football team for the 1964 Summer Olympics in Tokyo, but did not appear in any matches. He made two appearances for the senior side.

After retiring from playing, Marín became a football coach. He was appointed manager of Cruz Azul during the 1982–83 season. Later, he managed Deportivo Neza.

== Nicknames ==
He was initially referred to by the nickname "El Gato" (The Cat). However, due to his spectacular saves, the label of "El Superman" was applied by the famed commentator and broadcaster Rugama Angel Fernandez. Marin's brilliant career would place him in a unique position in football statistics, with a minimum number of goals allowed, making him the most effective goalkeeper in the history of Mexican football.

== Death ==
He was working as coach of the University of Querétaro when on 30 December 1991 he suffered a massive heart attack and was admitted to the Hospital of Santa Cruz de Querétaro.

== Honours ==
Vélez Sarsfield

- Argentine Primera División: 1968 Nacional

Cruz Azul

- Mexican Primera División: 1971–72, 1972–73, 1973–74, 1978–79, 1979–80
- Campeón de Campeones: 1974
- CONCACAF Champions' Cup: 1971

Argentina Youth

- CONMEBOL Pre-Olympic Tournament: 1964

Individual

- Mexican Primera División Golden Ball: 1979–80
