= Monito Rodríguez =

Mexican footballer (1946–2026)

Personal information
- Full name: Roberto Rodríguez Pérez
- Date of birth: 1 April 1946
- Place of birth: Tlaquiltenango, Morelos, Mexico
- Date of death: 7 September 2026 (aged 80)
- Position: Forward

Youth career
- 1962–1966: Tlahuicas

Senior career*
Years	Team	Apps	(Gls)
1966–1969	Zacatepec		
1969–1973	América		
1973–1976	Zacatepec		

International career
1971–1972	Mexico	16	(4)
Medal record
Men's football
Representing Mexico
CONCACAF Championship
Gold medal – first place	1971 Trinidad and Tobago	Team
- * Club domestic league appearances and goals

Roberto Rodríguez Pérez (1 April 1946 – 7 September 2026) was a Mexican football player and manager. Nicknamed "Monito", he played as a forward for Zacatepec and América throughout the late 1960s and the 1970s, being part of the squad that won the 1970–71 Mexican Primera División. He was also part of the winning Mexican squad for the 1971 CONCACAF Championship.

== Club career ==
Born as the youngest of 10 children in Tlaquiltenango, Rodríguez aspired to become a footballer at a young age. Despite initially not having enough time to practice playing for the sport, his speed and technical skill allowed talent scouts to notice and he began his career through his local club of Tlahuica. In 1962, he was accepted into the youth sector of Zacatepec and was later promoted to the senior squad for the 1966–67 Mexican Segunda División. He remained with the club for the remainder of the 1960s until he was signed to América for the 1969–70 season. He remained there throughout the early 1970s, winning the 1970–71 Mexican Primera División throughout his tenure with the club. He returned to Zacatepec which had recently been promoted to the top-flight of Mexican football for their 1973–74 season and stayed for two further seasons until his retirement in the 1975–76 season.

== International career ==
Rodríguez played for Mexico throughout 1971 and 1972, notably participating in the 1971 CONCACAF Championship where he was a part of the winning squad of the tournament.

== Managerial career ==
Following his retirement, he began his activity as an auxiliary coach of several reserve teams affiliated with América within the second, third and fourth divisions. Notably, he served as the assistant coach to Jorge Silva Vieira when the first team won the league championship in the 1988–89 Mexican Primera División. In addition, he coached Mexico's youth national team for the 1985 FIFA U-16 World Championship held in China.

== Death ==
Rodríguez died in September 2026, at the age of 80.
