= Amado Palacios =

Mexican footballer (1941–2025)

Personal information
- Full name: Amado Palacios Rendón
- Date of birth: 12 February 1941
- Place of birth: Juanacatlán, Jalisco, Mexico
- Date of death: 9 February 2025 (aged 83)
- Place of death: Mexico City, Mexico
- Height: 1.82 m (6 ft 0 in)
- Position: Goalkeeper

Senior career*
Years	Team	Apps	(Gls)
1957–1964	Necaxa		
1964–1969	Cruz Azul		
1970–1974	América		
1974–1975	→ Veracruz (loan)		
1975–1976	Atlético Potosino		
1976–1977	Zacatepec		

International career
1969	Mexico	2	(0)
- * Club domestic league appearances and goals

Amado Palacios Rendón (12 February 1941 – 9 February 2025) was a Mexican footballer and restaurant owner. Nicknamed "Tarzán", he played as a goalkeeper for Cruz Azul and América throughout the 1960s and the 1970s. He also represented Mexico for the 1969 CONCACAF Championship.

== Club career ==
Palacios began his career in 1957 with Necaxa where he primarily played as a reserve goalkeeper with not much success. This would change in the 1964–65 Mexican Primera División as he signed for Cruz Azul which had recently gained promotion to the top-flight of Mexican football for their 1964–65 season. Around this time, he was given his nickname of Tarzan due to his jumping abilities by club manager György Marik. During his final season with the club in the 1968–69 season, he was part of the first half of the "La Maquina" generation of players as he was part of the winning squads for the 1968–69 Mexican Primera División, the 1968–69 Copa México, the 1968–69 Campeón de Campeones and the 1969 CONCACAF Champions' Cup.

Following this immense success, Palacios then played for América for their 1970 season. During the subsequent 1970–71 season, during a match against Atlas, his teammate Mario Pérez got into a fight with Atlas midfielder Ernesto Cisneros. Palacios himself participated in the escalating brawl after tackling Juan Ignacio Basaguren who had thrown Pérez to the ground. This incident caused Palacios to not play in the final despite the protests of club owner Emilio Azcárraga Milmo. He would remain in the club in spite of this incident however, remaining until the 1973–74 season where he was part of the winning squad for the 1973–74 Copa México. Following his move to Veracruz, he was sold to the Tiburones Rojos de Veracruz. He would be unable to play for the club throughout the entire 1974–75 season as he spent his final seasons with Atlético Potosino and Zacatepec before retiring.

== International career ==
Palacios was called up to represent Mexico for the 1969 CONCACAF Championship. Throughout the tournament, he made three appearances in the 2–0 victory against Jamaica and the 0–2 and 0–1 losses against Costa Rica and Guatemala respectively.

== Personal life ==
Following his retirement, Palacios opened up a tortería in 1988 in Mexico City called "Las Tortas del Cheff" which has gone on to achieve a modicum of success as it would proceed to open up various other franchises across the city.

Palacios died on 9 February 2025, 3 days away from his 84th birthday.
