= 1988–89 Mexican Primera División season =

47th professional season of the top-flight football league in Mexico

Primera División de México
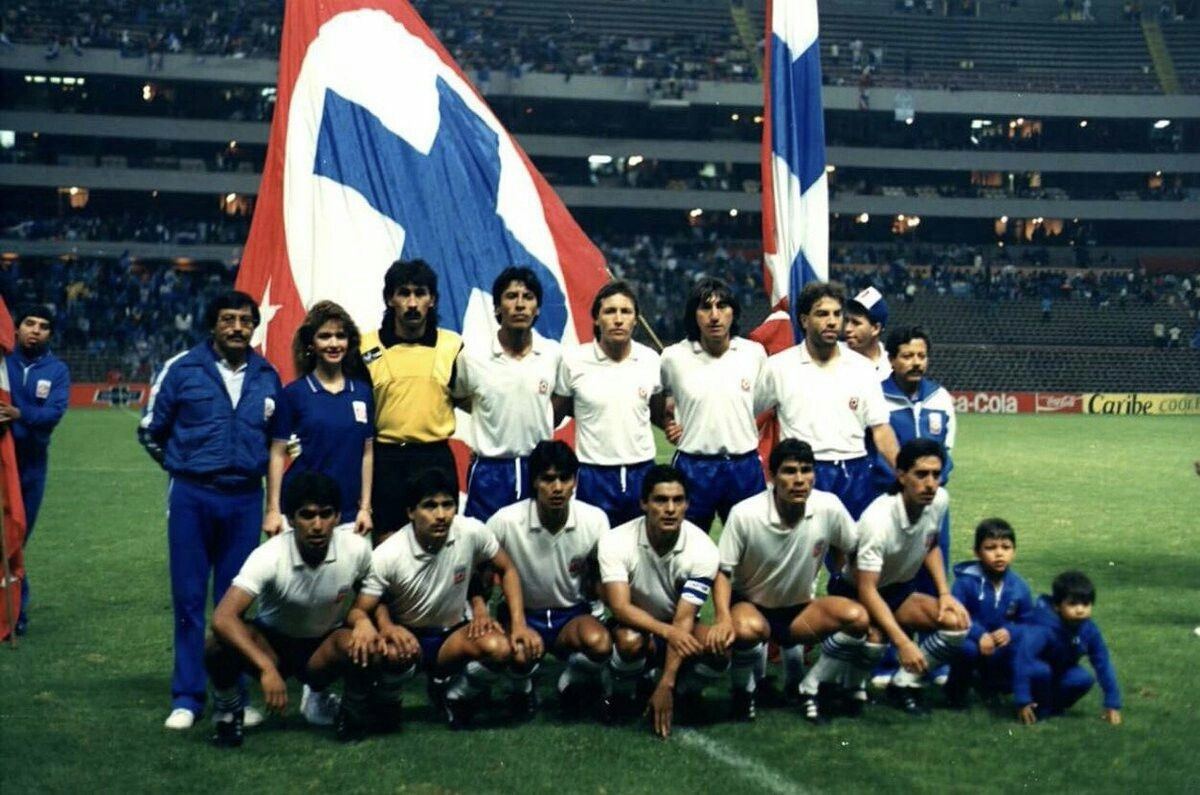
- Season: 1988–89
- Champions: América (8th title)
- Relegated: Atlético Potosino
- Champions' Cup: América
- Matches: 406
- Goals: 1,134 (2.79 per match)

Statistics of Primera División de México in season 1988–89.

== Overview ==
It was contested by 20 teams, and América won the championship.

Cobras was promoted from Segunda División.

Atlético Potosino was relegated to Segunda División.

=== Teams ===
Location of the 1988-89 Primera División teams

Team	City	Stadium
América	Mexico City	Azteca
Atlante	Mexico City	Azulgrana
Atlas	Guadalajara, Jalisco	Jalisco
Atlético Potosino	San Luis Potosí, S.L.P.	Plan de San Luis
Cobras	Ciudad Juárez, Chihuahua	Olímpico Benito Juárez
Cruz Azul	Mexico City	Azteca
Guadalajara	Guadalajara, Jalisco	Jalisco
Irapuato	Irapuato, Guanajuato	Irapuato
Morelia	Morelia, Michoacán	Venustiano Carranza / Morelos
Monterrey	Monterrey, Nuevo León	Tecnológico
Necaxa	Mexico City	Azteca
Puebla	Puebla, Puebla	Cuauhtémoc
Santos Laguna	Torreón, Coahuila	Estadio Corona
Tampico Madero	Tampico-Madero, Tamaulipas	Tamaulipas
Tecos	Zapopan, Jalisco	Tres de Marzo
Toluca	Toluca, State of Mexico	Toluca 70-86
UANL	Monterrey, Nuevo León	Universitario
UAT	Ciudad Victoria, Tamaulipas	Estadio Marte R. Gómez
UdeG	Guadalajara, Jalisco	Jalisco
UNAM	Mexico City	Olímpico Universitario

== Group stage ==
=== Group 1 ===
Pos	Team	Pld	W	D	L	GF	GA	GD	Pts	Qualification
1	América	38	17	9	12	58	39	+19	43	Playoff
2	Cruz Azul	38	16	11	11	68	59	+9	43	Playoff
3	Toluca	38	11	10	17	58	67	−9	32	
4	Irapuato	38	9	14	15	43	57	−14	32	
5	Monterrey	38	7	15	16	44	66	−22	29	

=== Group 2 ===
Pos	Team	Pld	W	D	L	GF	GA	GD	Pts	Qualification
1	Puebla	38	20	13	5	73	31	+42	53	Playoff
2	Atlante	38	20	9	9	59	41	+18	49	Playoff
3	U. de G.	38	15	11	12	48	51	−3	41	
4	UANL	38	11	11	16	38	60	−22	33	
5	Santos	38	7	15	16	31	56	−25	29	

=== Group 3 ===
Pos	Team	Pld	W	D	L	GF	GA	GD	Pts	Qualification or relegation
1	Tampico Madero	38	20	7	11	87	56	+31	47	Playoff
2	Guadalajara	38	19	9	10	66	43	+23	47	Playoff
3	Necaxa	38	17	11	10	57	38	+19	45	
4	Morelia	38	12	17	9	60	53	+7	41	
5	Atlético Potosino	38	6	10	22	31	68	−37	22	Relegated

=== Group 4 ===
Pos	Team	Pld	W	D	L	GF	GA	GD	Pts	Qualification
1	UNAM	38	13	15	10	42	30	+12	41	Playoff
2	Tecos	38	13	12	13	51	51	0	38	Playoff
3	Cobras	38	8	19	11	44	56	−12	35	
4	UAT	38	11	12	15	48	58	−10	34	
5	Atlas	38	9	8	21	47	73	−26	26	

== Results ==
Home \ Away	AME	ATE	ATS	COB	CAZ	GDL	IRA	MOR	MTY	NEC	POT	PUE	SAN	TAM	TEC	TOL	UNL	UAT	UDG	UNM
América	—	0–2	1–1	0–0	1–2	3–1	3–0	1–0	3–1	0–2	4–0	0–1	2–1	3–2	3–0	3–0	4–0	3–1	0–0	0–1
Atlante	3–0	—	2–0	3–1	2–2	1–1	3–1	4–3	3–2	2–0	1–0	0–2	4–2	0–0	1–0	1–0	3–0	2–1	2–1	1–0
Atlas	1–5	0–2	—	2–1	2–1	2–2	5–1	2–2	2–0	0–0	4–1	1–2	1–1	2–4	0–0	2–3	1–1	2–1	0–2	1–0
Cobras	3–2	1–1	3–0	—	1–1	1–1	1–1	0–0	2–2	2–1	0–0	0–0	2–2	3–5	0–0	1–1	4–1	3–0	2–1	1–3
Cruz Azul	1–3	0–3	5–0	1–1	—	0–1	2–1	1–1	2–2	2–0	2–1	0–0	1–0	1–2	3–4	4–2	4–0	3–2	2–1	1–0
Guadalajara	2–2	2–1	3–0	3–0	3–1	—	3–0	2–1	3–1	3–2	1–0	2–1	5–2	4–1	2–2	2–1	3–1	4–2	2–3	1–1
Irapuato	1–1	2–0	1–0	4–0	2–2	1–1	—	1–1	2–0	0–0	3–0	1–0	3–2	1–2	1–4	1–3	0–2	1–1	4–2	1–0
Morelia	2–1	1–0	3–2	4–0	3–3	3–2	1–1	—	1–1	2–1	4–0	2–1	0–0	1–0	4–2	3–3	4–2	1–1	1–2	1–0
Monterrey	1–1	1–2	2–1	0–0	1–4	1–1	0–0	2–2	—	0–1	1–1	0–2	1–0	3–1	3–2	0–2	1–0	0–1	1–1	0–3
Necaxa	0–0	3–1	6–0	1–1	4–1	1–0	2–0	1–1	2–2	—	4–3	1–0	2–0	3–0	1–0	0–0	3–0	3–1	1–2	0–2
Atlético Potosino	1–2	1–1	1–2	1–2	0–2	0–1	1–0	0–0	1–1	0–0	—	2–2	3–1	2–1	0–1	2–0	0–2	2–1	0–0	1–1
Puebla	3–1	1–1	3–1	3–0	1–1	2–0	2–0	4–1	3–0	2–2	4–0	—	6–0	1–1	4–1	3–0	3–1	2–2	2–1	1–1
Santos	1–2	1–0	0–0	0–0	1–1	1–0	0–0	1–1	2–0	0–0	3–1	1–4	—	0–0	1–1	2–1	2–1	1–0	0–1	0–0
Tampico Madero	2–0	3–1	2–1	3–2	5–0	0–1	2–0	3–0	4–2	2–1	4–0	5–1	4–1	—	1–3	7–2	3–0	5–5	5–1	1–1
Tecos	1–0	3–0	3–0	0–0	1–4	1–1	2–2	2–2	1–3	2–3	1–0	0–0	2–0	0–2	—	1–1	1–1	3–0	2–1	0–1
Toluca	0–2	1–1	2–1	1–1	2–3	1–0	3–3	1–0	3–3	2–3	5–3	0–1	2–0	4–2	1–2	—	4–1	4–1	0–0	0–1
UANL	0–0	2–2	1–0	3–2	3–2	1–0	0–0	2–1	1–3	1–2	2–1	0–0	1–1	1–0	1–1	2–0	—	1–0	1–0	0–3
UAT	0–0	2–1	2–0	1–1	1–0	1–0	1–1	3–2	3–0	3–1	1–0	1–1	0–0	2–2	0–1	2–1	1–1	—	0–1	2–0
UdeG	1–0	0–1	2–8	1–2	1–1	1–0	2–0	1–1	2–2	1–0	4–2	0–4	3–0	0–0	3–1	2–1	0–0	2–2	—	1–0
UNAM	1–2	1–1	2–0	3–0	1–2	0–3	3–2	0–0	1–1	0–0	0–0	1–1	1–1	3–1	1–0	1–1	1–1	3–0	1–1	—

Updated to match(es) played on 18 June 1989. Source: RSSSF
Legend: Blue = home team win; Yellow = draw; Red = away team win.

== Playoff ==
=== Semifinal ===
==== Group 1 ====
Pos	Team	Pld	W	D	L	GF	GA	GD	Pts	Qualification
1	América	6	3	2	1	12	6	+6	8	Final
2	Guadalajara	6	4	0	2	9	4	+5	8	
3	Puebla	6	1	3	2	7	10	−3	5	
4	Tecos	6	1	1	4	4	12	−8	3	

==== Group 2 ====
Pos	Team	Pld	W	D	L	GF	GA	GD	Pts	Qualification
1	Cruz Azul	6	4	0	2	10	9	+1	8	Final
2	Tampico Madero	6	3	1	2	9	10	−1	7	
3	UNAM	6	2	2	2	12	7	+5	6	
4	Atlante	6	0	3	3	9	14	−5	3	

== Final ==
Cruz Azul	2–3	América
Porfirio Jiménez 45'; Narciso Cuevas 47'	Report	Luís Roberto Alves 1'; Carlos Hermosillo 31'; Antonio Carlos Santos 58'

July 16, 1989

América	2–2	Cruz Azul
Juan Hernández 6'; Carlos Hermosillo 77'	Report	Patricio Hernández 20'; Ricardo Mojica 27'

Estadio Azteca, Mexico City
Referee: José Antonio Garza y Ochoa

America won 5-4 on aggregate.

1988-89 winners

8th title
