= Vernon Edwards =

American football player (born 1972)

No. 95
- Position: Defensive end

Personal information
- Born: June 23, 1972 (age 54); Houston, Texas, U.S.
- Listed height: 6 ft 4 in (1.93 m)
- Listed weight: 255 lb (116 kg)

Career information
- High school: Kashmere
- College: SMU
- NFL draft: 1995: undrafted

Career history
- San Diego Chargers (1995–1996)
- Stats at Pro Football Reference

Vernon Lajvin Edwards (born June 23, 1972) is an American former professional football defensive end who played for the San Diego Chargers of the National Football League (NFL). He played college football at Southern Methodist University.
