= Sergio Ceballos (footballer, born 1950) =

Mexican footballer (born 1951)

Personal information
- Full name: Sergio Ceballos Aldape
- Date of birth: 8 July 1950 (age 76)
- Place of birth: Mexico City, Mexico
- Position: Forward

Senior career*
Years	Team	Apps	(Gls)
1968–1974	América		
1974–1975	Atlético Potosino		
1975–1976	Cruz Azul		
1976	Guadalajara		
1977	Fort Lauderdale Strikers	5	(1)
1977–1978	Tigres UANL		
1978–1980	Atlético Potosino		
1980–1982	Atletas Campesinos		
1982–1984	Tampico Madero		

International career
1972	Mexico	4	(1)
- * Club domestic league appearances and goals

Sergio Ceballos Aldape (born 8 July 1950) is a retired Mexican footballer. Nicknamed "Tanque", he played as a forward for América, Atlético Potosino and many other clubs throughout the 1970s and early 1980s. He also briefly represented Mexico in 1972.

== Club career ==
Ceballos began his career within América for the 1968–69 Mexican Primera División for an average 5th place result, tying in 34 points with Pumas UNAM and Atlas. Following two mediocre seasons, the 1970–71 season saw one of the best results of the club's history, earning their second title following the 1970–71 Mexican Primera División. Following the 1973–74 season and winning the 1973–74 Copa México, he left for Atlético Potosino that had found itself recently promoted to the top-flight of Mexican football. He then briefly played for Cruz Azul for their 1974–75 season, becoming one of the few players to play for both clubs. He also briefly played for Guadalajara during the first half of their 1976–77 season, being an exceptionally rare anomaly in playing for all three clubs. Due to a lack of opportunities in Chivas however, he then played abroad in the United States for North American Soccer League club for the Fort Lauderdale Strikers. Despite only making only 5 appearances, he did manage to score a goal in his brief career abroad. He later spent the remainder of his career with Atlético Potosino, Atletas Campesinos and Tampico Madero until his retirement following the Mexican Primera División.

== International career ==
Ceballos was first called up in a 1–0 away loss in a friendly against Costa Rica on 6 August 1972 before playing in another friendly against Chile on 16 August that same year that ended in a 0–2 victory. His biggest international contribution came during the 1973 CONCACAF Championship qualifiers where he played in both matches against rivals United States with Ceballos even scoring in the 1–2 away victory. Despite qualifying for the final tournament, Ceballos was left out of the final roster.
