= 1979–80 Mexican Primera División season =

38th professional season of the top-flight football league in Mexico

Primera División de México
- Season: 1979–80
- Champions: Cruz Azul (7th title)
- Relegated: Jalisco
- Champions' Cup: Cruz Azul; UANL
- Matches: 406
- Goals: 1,106 (2.72 per match)

Statistics of the Primera División de México for the 1979–80 season.

== Overview ==
Atlas was promoted to Primera División.

This season was contested by 20 teams, and Cruz Azul won the championship.

Jalisco was relegated to Segunda División.

=== Teams ===
Location of the 1979-80 Primera División teams

Team	City	Stadium
América	Mexico City	Azteca
Atlante	Mexico City	Azteca
Atlas	Guadalajara, Jalisco	Jalisco
Atlético Español	Mexico City	Azteca
Atlético Potosino	San Luis Potosí, S.L.P.	Plan de San Luis
Cruz Azul	Mexico City	Azteca
Guadalajara	Guadalajara, Jalisco	Jalisco
Jalisco	Guadalajara, Jalisco	Jalisco
León	León, Guanajuato	León
Monterrey	Monterrey, Nuevo León	Universitario
Neza	Nezahualcóyotl, State of Mexico	Municipal de Texcoco
Puebla	Puebla, Puebla	Cuauhtémoc
Tampico	Tampico, Tamaulipas	Tamaulipas
Tecos	Zapopan, Jalisco	Tres de Marzo
Toluca	Toluca, State of Mexico	Toluca 70
Unión de Curtidores	León, Guanajuato	La Martinica
UANL	Monterrey, Nuevo León	Universitario
UdeG	Guadalajara, Jalisco	Jalisco
UNAM	Mexico City	Olímpico Universitario
Zacatepec	Zacatepec, Morelos	Agustín Coruco Díaz

== Group stage ==
=== Group 1 ===
Pos	Team	Pld	W	D	L	GF	GA	GD	Pts	Qualification
1	Cruz Azul	38	20	15	3	67	34	+33	55	Playoffs
2	Atlante	38	20	9	9	70	40	+30	49	Playoffs
3	Monterrey	38	9	16	13	40	50	−10	34	
4	Puebla	38	11	11	16	56	62	−6	33	
5	Jalisco	38	8	12	18	46	65	−19	28	Relegation Playoff

=== Group 2 ===
Pos	Team	Pld	W	D	L	GF	GA	GD	Pts	Qualification
1	UNAM	38	17	12	9	68	55	+13	46	Playoffs
2	Tampico	38	15	11	12	61	54	+7	41	Playoffs
3	Guadalajara	38	11	16	11	45	41	+4	38	
4	Atlético Potosino	38	8	13	17	34	52	−18	29	
5	Unión de Curtidores	38	10	8	20	39	53	−14	28	Relegation Playoff

=== Group 3 ===
Pos	Team	Pld	W	D	L	GF	GA	GD	Pts	Qualification
1	América	38	23	11	4	71	37	+34	57	Playoffs
2	Deportivo Neza	38	12	20	6	53	38	+15	44	Playoffs
3	Toluca	38	14	11	13	44	45	−1	39	
4	UDG	38	9	13	16	41	56	−15	31	
5	León	38	9	11	18	41	60	−19	29	

=== Group 4 ===
Pos	Team	Pld	W	D	L	GF	GA	GD	Pts	Qualification
1	Zacatepec	38	16	12	10	72	52	+20	44	Playoffs
2	UANL	38	14	12	12	62	64	−2	40	Playoffs
3	Tecos	38	11	14	13	51	61	−10	36	
4	Atlético Español	38	11	8	19	37	56	−19	30	
5	Atlas	38	9	11	18	47	70	−23	29	

== Results ==
Home \ Away	AME	ATN	ATL	ATE	APO	CRA	GDL	JAL	LEO	MTY	NEZ	PUE	TAM	TOL	UDC	TEC	UNL	UDG	UNM	ZAC
América		1–1	5–0	1–0	2–0	1–1	3–1	3–1	2–1	4–1	1–1	4–1	1–0	3–1	1–0	1–1	2–0	2–1	0–2	2–1
Atlante	1–0		2–2	4–1	2–2	1–2	3–2	2–1	3–0	1–0	0–1	3–0	3–1	3–2	3–1	2–0	1–2	0–1	2–3	3–2
Atlas	1–2	0–2		0–1	0–0	1–1	0–4	0–1	3–2	1–2	1–3	2–1	5–3	0–0	3–0	1–0	1–3	2–1	4–2	1–2
Atlético Español	0–1	0–3	1–2		2–1	1–2	0–0	1–1	0–2	1–1	0–3	1–2	1–1	0–3	3–1	1–0	2–0	4–0	2–3	1–4
Atlético Potosino	0–0	0–0	3–0	1–0		1–2	2–1	0–1	2–4	0–0	0–1	0–2	1–0	1–1	1–1	1–0	2–1	0–0	0–1	2–3
Cruz Azul	2–0	2–1	3–2	5–1	1–0		0–0	1–0	2–1	1–1	0–0	1–1	1–1	1–0	2–2	0–0	1–1	1–1	0–0	4–1
Guadalajara	1–1	1–1	0–0	0–0	2–3	1–2		3–2	1–1	0–1	0–0	1–1	0–0	2–1	0–2	1–0	4–1	2–0	1–1	2–0
Jalisco	0–1	0–1	1–1	0–1	0–0	0–3	2–1		0–0	2–1	1–1	1–1	0–1	1–0	2–0	3–0	2–4	5–2	2–2	1–2
León	2–2	1–0	3–2	1–2	1–2	1–6	0–0	3–2		1–1	0–0	0–4	1–1	1–1	0–1	0–0	3–0	1–2	1–3	1–1
Monterrey	2–1	2–4	2–1	2–0	1–1	2–1	2–3	0–0	0–0		1–1	2–0	0–1	1–0	1–1	2–0	1–1	2–2	1–1	1–3
Deportivo Neza	1–2	1–1	2–2	2–2	5–1	1–1	0–1	2–2	2–1	0–0		1–1	2–0	3–0	2–2	0–0	5–3	3–1	1–1	3–0
Puebla	3–3	2–3	1–1	0–1	2–0	1–4	0–0	5–2	2–1	5–2	0–0		2–1	0–1	4–5	0–0	0–2	1–0	1–1	2–1
Tampico	1–3	0–0	2–0	2–0	2–0	1–1	0–2	7–5	3–1	2–2	4–1	4–2		2–1	2–1	2–0	3–1	2–1	3–1	1–1
Toluca	1–3	1–0	2–2	2–2	2–1	0–3	3–1	2–1	2–0	2–0	0–0	3–4	2–2		3–1	2–0	3–3	4–3	2–1	1–0
Unión de Curtidores	0–1	1–1	1–2	0–2	3–0	1–0	0–3	4–0	1–0	1–1	0–1	2–1	2–2	4–1		0–1	3–1	0–1	1–0	3–3
Tecos	2–2	1–1	2–2	0–0	1–1	1–2	4–1	1–0	0–1	1–1	1–0	1–1	3–2	0–0	2–0		1–1	1–0	4–1	1–0
UANL	1–3	0–7	4–0	2–0	1–1	4–2	1–1	1–1	2–0	2–1	3–0	2–1	0–0	2–0	5–2	1–3		1–1	3–1	1–1
UDG	2–2	0–2	1–1	0–2	1–0	1–1	3–1	1–1	1–2	1–0	1–1	3–1	2–1	0–1	3–0	1–1	0–0		2–3	0–0
UNAM	2–4	4–1	3–1	2–1	2–2	1–3	1–1	2–2	0–1	2–0	2–1	1–0	2–0	2–0	5–2	1–0	3–0	1–1		1–1
Zacatepec	1–1	0–2	2–0	2–0	4–2	1–2	0–0	5–0	4–2	2–0	2–2	2–1	3–1	5–0	1–1	2–1	2–2	4–0	4–4	

Legend: Blue = home team win; Yellow = draw; Red = away team win.

== Relegation playoff ==
June 21, 1980

Jalisco	2-1	Unión de Curtidores
Manuel Nájera 49'; Samuel Rivas 50'	Report	Geraldo Goncalvez 90'

Estadio Jalisco, Guadalajara
June 28, 1980

Unión de Curtidores	3-1	Jalisco
Geraldo Goncalvez 64', 73'; José Ángel Martínez 80'	Report	Rubén Hugo Ayala 61'

Estadio La Martinica, León

Unión de Curtidores won 4-3 on aggregate. Jalisco was relegated to Segunda División.

== Playoff ==
=== Semifinal ===
==== Group 1 ====
Pos	Team	Pld	W	D	L	GF	GA	GD	Pts	Qualification
1	UANL	6	2	3	1	9	6	+3	7	Finals
2	América	6	2	2	2	6	5	+1	6	
3	UNAM	6	1	4	1	3	3	0	6	
4	Zacatepec	6	1	3	2	5	9	−4	5	

Group A Results

Round 1
América 1 - 2 U.A.N.L.
U.N.A.M. 0 - 0 Zacatepec

Round 2
América 2 - 0 Zacatepec
U.A.N.L. 0 - 1 U.N.A.M.

Round 3
U.N.A.M. 0 - 1 América
Zacatepec 1 - 1 U.A.N.L.

Round 4
Zacatepec 0 - 0 U.N.A.M.
U.A.N.L. 0 - 0 América

Round 5
Zacatepec 3 - 2 América
U.N.A.M. 2 - 2 U.A.N.L.

Round 6
América 0 - 0 U.N.A.M.
U.A.N.L. 4 - 1 Zacatepec

==== Group B ====
Pos	Team	Pld	W	D	L	GF	GA	GD	Pts	Qualification
1	Cruz Azul	6	4	0	2	8	6	+2	8	Finals
2	Atlante	6	2	2	2	12	10	+2	6	
3	Deportivo Neza	6	2	2	2	5	5	0	6	
4	Tampico Madero	6	1	2	3	6	10	−4	4	

Group B Results

Round 1
Tampico Madero 0 - 1 Cruz Azul
Neza 1 – 0 Atlante

Round 2
Cruz Azul 4 - 2 Atlante
Neza 1 - 1 Tampico Madero

Round 3
Neza 0 - 2 Cruz Azul
Atlante 5 - 2 Tampico

Round 4
Cruz Azul 0 - 1 Tampico Madero
Atlante 1 – 1 Neza

Round 5
Cruz Azul 1 - 0 Neza
Tampico Madero 1 - 1 Atlante

Round 6
Tampico Madero 1 - 2 Neza
Atlante 3 - 1 Cruz Azul

== Final ==
July 10, 1980

UANL	0-1	Cruz Azul
	Report	Rodolfo Montoya 86'

Estadio Universitario, San Nicolás de los Garza
July 13, 1980

Cruz Azul	3-3	UANL
Adrián Camacho 4'; Rodolfo Montoya 11', 56'	Report	Gerónimo Barbadillo 52'; Alfredo Jiménez 80'; Juan Manuel Azuara 86'

Estadio Azteca, Mexico City

Cruz Azul won 4-3 on aggregate.

1979–80 winners

7th title
