= Prudencio Cortés =

Mexican footballer (born 1951)

Personal information
- Full name: Prudencio Cortés Sánchez
- Date of birth: 18 November 1951 (age 74)
- Place of birth: El Salto, Jalisco, Mexico
- Position: Goalkeeper

Senior career*
Years	Team	Apps	(Gls)
1969–1970	Zamora		
1970–1975	América	121	(51)
1975–1987	Tecos UAG		

International career
1972–1981	Mexico	7	(0)
Medal record
Men's football
Representing Mexico
CONCACAF Championship
Bronze medal – third place	1981 Honduras	Team
- * Club domestic league appearances and goals

Prudencio Cortés Sánchez (born 18 November 1951) is a Mexican retired footballer. Nicknamed "Pajarito", he played as a goalkeeper for América and Tecos UAG throughout the 1970s and the 1980s. He also represented Mexico internationally for the 1981 CONCACAF Championship.

== Club career ==
Cortés began his career with Zamora for the 1969–70 Mexican Segunda División where the club had an average performance at 7th place. Despite this, he only stayed for a single season as in a surprise decision, América took interest in Cortés as he slowly began to take over the main goalkeeper position from Amado Palacios as despite his age, he played in the final of the 1970–71 Mexican Primera División where he contributed to the Águilas winning their second title in the top-flight of Mexican football. He continued to play for the following few seasons, being part of the winning squad for the 1973–74 Copa México before leaving the club following the 1974–75 season. He then spent the remainder of his career with Tecos UAG, retiring following the 1986–87 Mexican Primera División.

== International career ==
Cortés made his international debut as a substiute for Rafael Puente who was the main goalkeeper for Mexico at the time in a friendly against Chile on 26 January 1972 that ended in a 2–0 victory, becoming the youngest goalkeeper in international Mexican history. His role as a substitute goalkeeper continued that same year as he served as Ignacio Calderón's substitute in another friendly against Peru on 5 April that ended in a 2–1 victory as well as in another friendly against Hungary that ended in a 4–0 beating, coming in as a substitute for Moisés Camacho on 3 February 1976. His largest role came during the 1981 CONCACAF Championship where he served as the Tricolor's main goalkeeper throughout nearly every match except for the game against Honduras. His international career soon ended following Mexico's failure to qualify for the 1982 FIFA World Cup.
