= Cesáreo Victorino (footballer, born 1947) =

Mexican footballer

Cesáreo Victorino Ramírez
Personal information
- Date of birth: 8 February 1947
- Date of death: 19 June 1999 (aged 52)
- Position: Forward

Senior career*
Years	Team	Apps	(Gls)
1965–1973	Cruz Azul	?	(?)
1973–1975	Oro Jalisco	?	(?)
1975–1980	Club América	53	(3)

International career
1967–1973	Mexico	18	(4)
- * Club domestic league appearances and goals

Cesáreo Victorino Ramírez (8 February 1947 – 19 June 1999) was a Mexican footballer who competed in the 1968 Summer Olympics.

After his active career, Victorino worked as a coach. He had recently trained a young team from CF Pachuca. On 19 June 1999, he was on a bus trip to Acapulco with a team he trained to complete a friendship game. In the immediate vicinity of the city of Cuernavaca the bus failed. There were 15 injured and five death victims, including Cesáreo Victorino.
