= Atlético Potosino =

Association football club in Mexico

Club Atlético Potosino
- Full name: Club Atlético Potosino A.C.
- Nickname: Cachorros
- Founded: 1972 (original); 2008 (revival)
- Dissolved: 1989, 2010
- Ground: Estadio Plan de San Luis; San Luis Potosí, San Luis Potosí, Mexico
- Capacity: 20,000
- Owner: Gregorio Navarro Cano
- League: Liga de Ascenso de México

Club Atlético Potosino was a Mexican football team that played most of their years in the Primera División de México. The club was last held in the city of San Luis Potosí, San Luis Potosí. They were known by the nickname of Cachorros and played with blue uniform with two vertical stripes on the left side of about 7 cm wide yellow and white that meant gold and silver that were exploited by the Spaniards in colonial times and their shield was the water box emblem historical monument of the city.

== History ==
The team was founded in 1972 by the name of Pumas de la Universidad Autónoma de San Luis (Pumas - UASLP), debuting at Segunda División de México. At first, it was regarded as an inferior when compared to the San Luis which had been founded in 1966 and then active in the Primera División de México.

After two seasons in the Segunda Division de Mexico, the team was invited by the Federación Mexicana de Fútbol (FMF) part of the Primera División de México for the 1974–75 season, with the aim of expanding the league to 20 teams, the other club that was invited was Unión de Curtidores, this privilege was given at the end as semi-finalists in the Segunda División, but the name UASLP-Pumas had to be changed to Atlético Potosino because UNAM did not allow the team used the same nickname. In the 1973–74 season, Club San Luis had dropped to the Segunda División and Atlético Potosino had taken the place as the main team in the region.

In the 1975–76, season the team was in very serious relegation trouble and played a relegation playoff against Atlante to decide who descended. With an aggregate score of 2–1, Atlético Potosino achieved permanence and send Atlante to the Segunda División de México.

For the 1976 season, San Luis returned the maximum circuit and gave rise to a Potosino classic. They would play two games in the 1976–1977 season, the first of which was at Week 14 ended in a 1–1 tie, while the second was in Week 33 with a score of 2–0 for the San Luis. In this season, both teams qualified for the playoffs but did not face each other again. In 1977, San Luis was moved to Tampico, Tamaulipas and sold to Tampico Madero, and the city of San Luis Potosí would only have one team.

Atlético Potosino continued with outstanding seasons in the top level, reaching three liguillas. Their best season was the 1978–79 season, in which they finished in fifth place overall command of Alberto Guerra.

In the 1983–84 season, they played another relegation playoff against Unión de Curtidores and once again were saved from relegation. However, it fell disastrously in the campaign 1988–89 season with Jesús de Anda as coach, his last match was a 4–0 defeat against Tampico Madero.

Their last 3 seasons in the Primera División were quite contrasting, in the 1986–87 season they were just a point to qualify for the playoffs with a team formed by 80% by Potosinos players, including notable players such as René Isidoro García, Mauricio López and Víctor Medina, reinforced by players Nelson Sanhueza, Chilean Luis "Cholo" Castro, the Paraguayan Eligio Torres, and other prominent players. The manager in this tournament was José Camacho.

For the following season, the team did not reinforce themselves leading to José Camacho was soon sacked, and Pedro Araya was hired, he could but he was unable to help the team to top form. Then after the Argentine Luis Grill Prieto coached the last match and saves the team from relegation after earning a tie against Correcaminos, with a goal from midfielder Jaime León.

In the 1988–89 season, the team suffered the losses of key players coming pretty bad reinforcements as the Chilean Juan "Rápido" Rojas, and some other players who did not perform as expected, Rodolfo Villegas, Paco Uribe, Rafael Bautista among others, emerging as figure midfielder David Rangel. This caused the team to be relegated to the Primera División 'A' de México.

Their last two seasons in the Liga de Ascenso went unnoticed until the owner decided to sell the franchise.

=== Total Numbers ===
Atlético Potosino in the Primera División de México:

GP	W	T	L	GF	GA	Pts	DIF
576	165	174	237	646	865	504	−219

Copa México:

GP	W	T	L	GF	GA	Pts
24	7	8	9	27	36	22

== Coaches ==
- Jesús de Anda
- Ángel Zubieta
- José Navarro Corona
- Jesus Silva Cabrera
- Ciro Barbosa
- Luis Grill Prieto
- Carlos Turcato
- Alberto Guerra
- Jesús Prado
- José Camacho
- Pedro Araya
- Jorge Ortega
- Ildefonso Mendoza
- Marco Antonio Martínez
- José Luis Hernández

== Honours ==
- (Mexico) Segunda División de México:

Runner-up 1973–74
