= Guillermo Hernández (footballer, born 1942) =

Mexican footballer (born 1942)

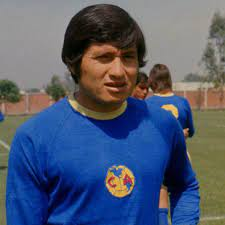
- Hernández playing for Club América

Personal information
- Full name: Guillermo Alejandro Hernández Sánchez
- Date of birth: June 25, 1942 (age 84)
- Place of birth: Zacoalco de Torres, Jalisco, Mexico
- Position: Defender

Senior career*
Years	Team	Apps	(Gls)
1963–1967	Atlas		
1967–1969	Veracruz		
1969–1974	América		

International career
1966–1973	Mexico	55	(2)
- * Club domestic league appearances and goals

Guillermo Alejandro Hernández Sánchez (born June 25, 1942) is a Mexican former football defender, who played for the Mexico national team between 1966 and 1973, gaining 55 caps and scoring 2 goals. He was part of the Mexico squad for the 1966 and 1970 World Cups.
