= Juan Manuel Borbolla =

Mexican footballer (born 1951)

Personal information
- Full name: Juan Manuel Borbolla Pérez
- Date of birth: 28 June 1951 (age 75)
- Place of birth: Mexico City, Mexico
- Position: Forward

Senior career*
Years	Team	Apps	(Gls)
1970–1974	América		
1974–1978	Atlético Español		
1978–1982	Puebla		

International career
1971–1973	Mexico	7	(2)
- * Club domestic league appearances and goals

Juan Manuel Borbolla (born 28 June 1951) is a retired Mexican footballer. He played as a forward for América, Atlético Español and Puebla throughout the 1970s and early 1980s. He also represented Mexico internationally from 1971 to 1973.

== Club career ==
Making his senior debut for the 1970 season, Borbolla's first taste of success was found during the following 1970–71 season where the Águilas achieved their second title in the top-flight of Mexican football. He remained in the club throughout the remainder of the early 1970s, winning his final title with the club following their success in the 1973–74 Copa México. He then played for Atlético Español where his biggest career highlight came through their victory at the 1975 CONCACAF Champions' Cup, being the only international title Borbolla would secure as he scored in the first legged match against Surinamese club Transvaal. He then spent the remainder of his career with Puebla throughout the late 1970s and early 1980s, playing alongside players such as Carlos Gómez, Picolé and Lino Espín.

== International career ==
Borbolla was first called up to represent Mexico in a friendly against West Germany on 8 September 1971 that ended in a 0–5 away loss. However, the Tricolor would recoup their loss in another away match against Chile in a 0–2 victory on 16 August. His most significant contribution came during the 1973 CONCACAF Championship qualifiers as they served as the first stage of qualification for the 1974 FIFA World Cup. He gained prominence upon scoring a goal against Canada on 24 August 1972. He then scored another goal against the United States on 10 September that same year as he played in all matches within their group. Despite ultimately qualifying for the 1973 CONCACAF Championship, Borbolla was left out of the final roster for the tournament for some reason as his final international appearance came in a friendly against the United States on 16 October 1973 that ended in a 2–0 victory.
