= José Antonio Roca =

Mexican footballer and manager (1928–2007)

Personal information
- Full name: José Antonio Roca García
- Date of birth: 24 May 1928
- Place of birth: Mexico City, Mexico
- Date of death: 4 May 2007 (aged 78)
- Place of death: Mexico City, Mexico
- Position: Defender

Senior career*
Years	Team	Apps	(Gls)
1949–1950	Necaxa		
1950–1952	Asturias		
1954–1958	Zacatepec		
- Atlante

International career
1949–1958	Mexico	10	(1)

Managerial career
- 1970–1975: América
- 1975–1976: Laguna
- 1976: Atlético Español
- 1977–1978: Mexico
- 1978–1979: Tampico
- 1979–1981: América
- 1981–1982: Atlas
- 1982–1984: Toluca
- 1984–1985: Necaxa
- 1985–1987: Atlante
- 1987–1988: Ángeles Puebla
- * Club domestic league appearances and goals

José Antonio Roca García (24 May 1928 – 4 May 2007) was a Mexican football player and manager.

== Life and career ==
Born in Mexico City, Roca played football for Asturias F.C., Club Necaxa, Zacatepec and Atlante F.C.

After he retired from playing, Roca became a football manager, leading Club América for 173 matches during 1970 to 1975. He would also manage Club de Fútbol Laguna, Atlético Español, Tampico Madero, Atlas, Toluca, Club Necaxa, Atlante F.C. and Ángeles de Puebla.

== International career ==
He played internationally with the Selección de fútbol de México, in three FIFA World Cup (1950, 1954 and 1958) tournaments as a player and one (1978) as manager.
