= Roberto Hodge =

Chilean footballer (1944–1986)

Personal information
- Full name: Roberto Williams Hodge Rivera
- Date of birth: 30 July 1944
- Place of birth: La Serena, Chile
- Date of death: 12 August 1986 (aged 42)
- Place of death: Santiago, Chile
- Position: Midfielder

Senior career*
Years	Team	Apps	(Gls)
1962–1970	Universidad de Chile	159	(19)
1971–1974	América	134	(6)
1974–1975	Tigres UANL		
1975–1977	Tecos		
1977	Palestino		
1978–1980	Aviación		
1981	Cobresal		

International career
1964–1977	Chile	39	(1)
- * Club domestic league appearances and goals

Roberto Williams Hodge Rivera (30 July 1944 – 12 August 1986) was a Chilean footballer who played as a midfielder.

== Career ==
Hodge played for Chile in the 1966 FIFA World Cup. He also played for Universidad de Chile, América, Tigres UANL and Tecos. Hodge died from pancreatic cancer in 1986.
