= 1972–73 Mexican Primera División season =

31st professional season of the top-flight football league in Mexico

Primera División de México
- Season: 1972–73
- Champions: Cruz Azul (4th title)
- Relegated: Pachuca
- Matches: 321
- Goals: 837 (2.61 per match)

Statistics of the Primera División de México for the 1972–73 season.

== Overview ==
Atlas was promoted to Primera División.

It was contested by 18 teams, and Cruz Azul won the championship.

Pachuca was relegated to Segunda División.

=== Teams ===
Location of the 1972-73 Primera División teams

Team	City	Stadium
América	Mexico City	Azteca
Atlante	Mexico City	Azteca
Atlas	Guadalajara, Jalisco	Jalisco
Atlético Español	Mexico City	Azteca
Cruz Azul	Mexico City	Azteca
Guadalajara	Guadalajara, Jalisco	Jalisco
Jalisco	Guadalajara, Jalisco	Jalisco
Laguna	Torreón, Coahuila	San Isidro
León	León, Guanajuato	León
Monterrey	Monterrey, Nuevo León	Tecnológico / Universitario
Pachuca	Pachuca, Hidalgo	Revolución Mexicana
Puebla	Puebla, Puebla	Cuauhtémoc
San Luis	San Luis Potosí, S.L.P.	Plan de San Luis
Toluca	Toluca, State of Mexico	Toluca 70
Torreón	Torreón, Coahuila	Moctezuma
UNAM	Mexico City	Olímpico Universitario
Veracruz	Veracruz, Veracruz	Veracruzano
Zacatepec	Zacatepec, Morelos	Agustín "Coruco" Díaz

== Group stage ==
=== Group 1 ===
Pos	Team	Pld	W	D	L	GF	GA	GD	Pts	Qualification
1	Cruz Azul	34	19	8	7	60	37	+23	46	Playoffs
2	Atlético Español	34	12	12	10	43	43	0	36	Playoffs
3	UNAM	34	14	7	13	37	32	+5	35	
4	Puebla	34	12	9	13	46	46	0	33	
5	Guadalajara	34	10	12	12	38	39	−1	32	
6	Monterrey	34	10	12	12	31	38	−7	32	
7	Veracruz	34	10	12	12	41	51	−10	32	
8	Zacatepec	34	8	12	14	41	50	−9	28	Relegation Playoffs
9	Pachuca	34	9	6	19	40	68	−28	24	Relegation Playoffs

=== Group 2 ===
Pos	Team	Pld	W	D	L	GF	GA	GD	Pts	Qualification
1	León	34	18	8	8	59	34	+25	44	Playoffs
2	Atlas	34	18	8	8	63	38	+25	44	Playoffs
3	América	34	13	16	5	52	33	+19	42	
4	Toluca	34	13	13	8	51	39	+12	39	
5	Atlante	34	9	14	11	40	47	−7	32	
6	Jalisco	34	12	7	15	45	57	−12	31	
7	San Luis	34	9	11	14	49	57	−8	29	
8	Torreón	34	9	9	16	37	54	−17	27	Relegation Playoffs
9	Laguna	34	8	10	16	36	46	−10	26	Relegation Playoffs

== Results ==
Home \ Away	AME	ATT	ATL	ATE	CRA	GDL	JAL	LAG	LEO	MTY	PAC	PUE	SNL	TOL	TOR	UNM	VER	ZAC
América		3–2	2–1	1–1	0–0	1–0	2–1	1–0	1–1	1–1	4–0	2–2	1–2	0–0	2–0	0–0	5–1	3–0
Atlante	0–0		1–1	1–1	1–0	2–0	2–1	0–0	0–2	2–2	1–1	2–2	5–2	2–2	2–2	1–2	2–0	2–1
Atlas	3–1	3–2		0–1	1–2	2–1	3–3	3–2	1–0	1–3	5–1	0–0	4–0	4–1	2–1	1–1	4–1	2–0
Atlético Español	0–4	2–1	1–3		2–3	0–0	0–2	2–1	0–0	0–0	4–4	2–3	1–0	0–0	3–0	2–0	1–1	2–1
Cruz Azul	2–2	0–1	2–0	1–2		3–1	1–0	2–1	1–1	3–1	2–1	3–2	4–0	2–4	1–0	2–1	3–0	1–1
Guadalajara	0–0	0–0	1–0	1–1	1–3		2–2	2–1	2–2	1–0	1–1	6–0	1–2	0–2	3–0	2–1	1–1	0–0
Jalisco	3–2	2–0	0–4	2–1	0–2	1–2		0–3	0–1	1–1	3–2	3–2	1–0	3–2	0–4	0–2	0–1	2–2
Laguna	0–0	0–0	0–2	1–2	2–3	2–1	3–1		0–1	0–0	0–0	2–0	2–1	2–1	2–0	1–1	0–3	0–2
León	1–2	4–0	0–1	2–0	2–2	1–0	3–1	2–3		2–1	3–0	2–0	1–0	3–2	2–0	1–0	6–1	5–3
Monterrey	1–1	0–1	1–1	1–0	2–1	0–0	2–1	1–0	2–1		1–0	3–2	1–1	2–2	2–1	0–2	0–0	1–0
Pachuca	1–2	2–2	1–2	1–0	1–4	0–2	2–4	3–2	1–0	3–0		2–1	1–1	3–1	3–0	0–1	1–1	2–1
Puebla	3–2	0–1	0–0	2–3	2–1	4–2	0–1	2–1	1–0	1–0	3–0		3–1	0–1	2–1	0–1	3–0	2–2
San Luis	0–0	0–0	2–3	2–2	1–1	3–0	1–1	4–0	2–4	2–2	2–0	1–1		2–2	2–0	3–0	1–2	4–1
Toluca	2–2	2–1	1–1	2–2	0–0	0–0	0–0	1–0	1–1	1–0	3–0	2–0	1–0		4–0	0–1	4–2	0–1
Torreón	0–0	3–2	2–1	0–2	1–2	2–1	2–3	2–2	4–1	1–0	2–0	0–0	3–3	0–3		2–1	0–0	1–0
UNAM	1–2	2–0	1–1	1–0	1–0	0–0	1–2	2–2	0–2	3–0	0–2	3–0	1–2	0–1	2–2		1–0	2–0
Veracruz	3–2	1–1	1–0	1–2	1–1	1–2	1–1	1–1	1–1	1–0	1–0	0–1	6–1	4–2	0–0	1–0		2–3
Zacatepec	1–1	4–0	2–3	1–1	1–2	1–2	1–0	0–0	1–1	1–0	4–2	1–1	2–1	1–1	1–1	0–2	1–1	

Legend: Blue = home team win; Yellow = draw; Red = away team win.

== Relegation playoff ==
=== Bracket ===
Semifinals
15	Laguna (agg 4-1)	1	0	3
17	Zacatepec	0	1	0
16	Torreón	0	3	3
18	Pachuca	0	1	1

Final
17	Zacatepec	0	1	1
18	Pachuca	0	0	0

=== Semifinal ===
27 May 1973

Laguna	1-0	Zacatepec
Ramírez 56'

Estadio San Isidro, Torreón
3 June 1973

Zacatepec	1-0	Laguna
Estrada 31' (pen.)

Estadio Agustín Coruco Díaz, Zacatepec

Aggregate tied. 3rd match will be played.

6 June 1973

Laguna	3-0	Zacatepec
Lostaunau 5'; Reyes 43'; Ramírez 66'

Estadio Jalisco, Guadalajara

Laguna won 4–1 on aggregate.

3 June 1973

Torreón	0-0	Pachuca

Estadio Moctezuma, Torreón
10 June 1973

Pachuca	1-3	Torreón
González 46'		Tarabini 28'; Estrada 28'; Cibeyra 87'

Estadio Revolución Mexicana, Pachuca

Torreón won 3–1 on aggregate.

=== Relegation Final ===
20 June 1973

Pachuca	0-0	Zacatepec

Estadio Azteca, Mexico City

Aggregate tied. A replay will be played

23 June 1973

Pachuca	0-1	Zacatepec
		Peralta 61'

Estadio Azteca, Mexico City

Zacatepec won 1–0 in aggregate. Pachuca was relegated to Segunda Division.

== Championship playoff ==
=== Bracket ===
Semifinals
1	Cruz Azul	3	1	4
3	Atlas	2	0	2
2	León	0	3	1 (6)
4	Atlético Español	0	3	1 (5)

Final
1	Cruz Azul	1	0	2
2	León	1	0	1

=== Semifinal ===
26 May 1973

Atlas	2-3	Cruz Azul
Chavarín 8', 36'		Pulido 49'; López Salgado 57'; Muciño 85'

Estadio Jalisco, Guadalajara
3 June 1973

Cruz Azul	1-0	Atlas
López Salgado 38'

Estadio Azteca, Mexico City

Cruz Azul won 4–2 on aggregate.

26 May 1973

Atlético Español	0-0	León

Estadio Azteca, Mexico City
3 June 1973

León	3-3	Atlético Español
Salomone 25', 66'; Albrecht 52' (pen.)		Tabaré González 2'; Boy 76'; Brandon 89'

Estadio León, León

Aggregate tied. 3rd match will be played.

6 June 1973

León	1-1 (a.e.t.)	Atlético Español
Albrecht 80' (pen.)		Bustos 20'
Penalties
	6–5

Estadio Cuauhtémoc, Puebla

Aggregate 4-4. León won in penalties 6-5.

=== Final ===
June 12, 1973

León	1-1	Cruz Azul
Albrecht	Report	Bustos

Estadio León, Leon, Guanajuato

León	Cruz Azul

GK	1	(Mexico) Darío Miranda	(substituted off) 28'
DF	2	(Mexico) Arturo Razo
DF	3	(Mexico) Héctor Santoyo
DF	4	(Argentina) Rafael Albrecht
DF	5	(Mexico) Carlos Gómez
MF	6	(Mexico) Chepe Chávez	(substituted off) 70'
MF	7	(Mexico) Luis Estrada
MF	8	(Mexico) Mario Ayala (c)
FW	9	(Mexico) José de Jesús Valdez
FW	10	(Argentina) Jorge Davino
FW	11	(Argentina) Roberto Salomone
Substitutes:
MF	12	(Uruguay) Roberto Repetto	(substituted on) 70'
Manager:
(Brazil) José Gomes Nogueira

GK	1	(Argentina) Miguel Marín
DF	2	(Mexico) Marco Antonio Ramírez
DF	3	(Mexico) Javier Guzmán
DF	4	(Chile) Alberto Quintano
DF	5	(Mexico) Pedro Velázquez
MF	7	(Mexico) Héctor Pulido (c)
MF	6	(Mexico) Juan Manuel Alejándrez	(substituted off) 77'
MF	8	(Mexico) Cesáreo Victorino	(substituted off) ?'
FW	9	(Mexico) Fernando Bustos
FW	10	(Mexico) Horacio López Salgado	(substituted off) ?'
FW	11	(Paraguay) Eladio Vera
Substitutes:
FW	12	(Argentina) Alberto Gómez	(substituted on) ?'
Manager:
(Mexico) Raúl Cárdenas

June 17, 1973

Cruz Azul	0-0	León
	Report

Estadio Azteca, Mexico City
Referee: Javier Galindo

Cruz Azul	León

GK	1	(Argentina) Miguel Marín
DF	2	(Mexico) Marco Antonio Ramírez
DF	3	(Mexico) Javier Guzmán
DF	4	(Chile) Alberto Quintano
DF	5	(Mexico) Pedro Velázquez
MF	7	(Mexico) Héctor Pulido (c)
MF	6	(Mexico) Juan Manuel Alejándrez	(substituted off) 77'
MF	8	(Mexico) Cesáreo Victorino	(substituted off) ?'
FW	9	(Mexico) Fernando Bustos
FW	10	(Mexico) Octavio Muciño	(substituted off) ?'
FW	11	(Paraguay) Eladio Vera
Substitutes:
FW	12	(Argentina) Alberto Gómez	(substituted on) ?'
FW	13	(Mexico) Horacio López Salgado	(substituted on) ?'
Manager:
(Mexico) Raúl Cárdenas

GK	1	(Mexico) Darío Miranda	(substituted off) 28'
DF	2	(Mexico) Arturo Razo
DF	3	(Mexico) Héctor Santoyo
DF	4	(Argentina) Rafael Albrecht
DF	5	(Mexico) Carlos Gómez
MF	6	(Mexico) Chepe Chávez
MF	7	(Mexico) Mario Ayala (c)
MF	8	(Mexico) Luis Estrada
FW	9	(Mexico) José de Jesús Valdez
FW	10	(Argentina) Jorge Davino
FW	11	(Argentina) Roberto Salomone
Substitutes:
GK	12	(Mexico) Jorge Jaramillo	(substituted on) 28'
Manager:
(Brazil) José Gomes Nogueira

Aggregate 1-1. 3rd match will be played.

June 19, 1973

Cruz Azul	2-1 (a.e.t.)	León
Guzmán; Davino 115' (o.g.)	Report	Salomone 26'

Estadio Cuauhtémoc, Puebla
Attendance: 35,000

Cruz Azul	León

GK	1	(Argentina) Miguel Marín
DF	2	(Mexico) Marco Antonio Ramírez	(substituted off) 40'
DF	3	(Mexico) Javier Guzmán
DF	4	(Chile) Alberto Quintano
DF	5	(Mexico) Pedro Velázquez
MF	7	(Mexico) Cesáreo Victorino
MF	6	(Mexico) Héctor Pulido (c)
MF	8	(Mexico) Juan Manuel Alejándrez
FW	9	(Mexico) Fernando Bustos
FW	10	(Mexico) Octavio Muciño
FW	11	(Paraguay) Eladio Vera	(substituted off) 76'
Substitutes:
FW	12	(Argentina) Ignacio Flores	(substituted on) 40'
FW	13	(Mexico) Alberto Gómez	(substituted on) 76'
Manager:
(Mexico) Raúl Cárdenas

GK	1	(Mexico) Darío Miranda
DF	2	(Mexico) Arturo Razo
DF	3	(Mexico) Carlos Gómez
DF	4	(Argentina) Rafael Albrecht
DF	5	(Mexico) Martín Villanueva
DF	6	(Mexico) Salvador Carrillo	(substituted off) 80'
MF	7	(Mexico) Luis Estrada	(substituted off) 74'
MF	8	(Mexico) Mario Ayala (c)
MF	9	(Mexico) Chepe Chávez
FW	10	(Mexico) José de Jesús Valdez	(substituted off) 66'
FW	11	(Argentina) Roberto Salomone
Substitutes:
FW	13	(Argentina) Jorge Davino	(substituted on) 66'
FW	14	(Mexico) Mario Cuevas	(substituted on) 74'
DF	15	(Mexico) Héctor Santoyo	(substituted on) 80'
Manager:
(Brazil) José Gomes Nogueira

Cruz Azul won 3–2 on aggregate.

1972–73 winners

4th title

== Top scorers ==
Player	Nationality	Goals	Club
Enrique Borja	Mexico	24	América
Ricardo Chavarín	Mexico	23	Atlas
Horacio López Salgado	Mexico	18	Cruz Azul
Amaury Silva	Brazil	14	Atlas
Cirilo Peralta	Mexico	14	Zacatepec
Carlos Reinoso	Chile	14	América
Eladio Vera	Paraguay	12	Cruz Azul
Jorge Davino	Argentina	12	León
Juan González	Mexico	12	Pachuca
Roberto Salomone	Argentina	11	León
Ricardo Brandon	Uruguay	11	Atlético Español
