= List of Cruz Azul records and statistics =

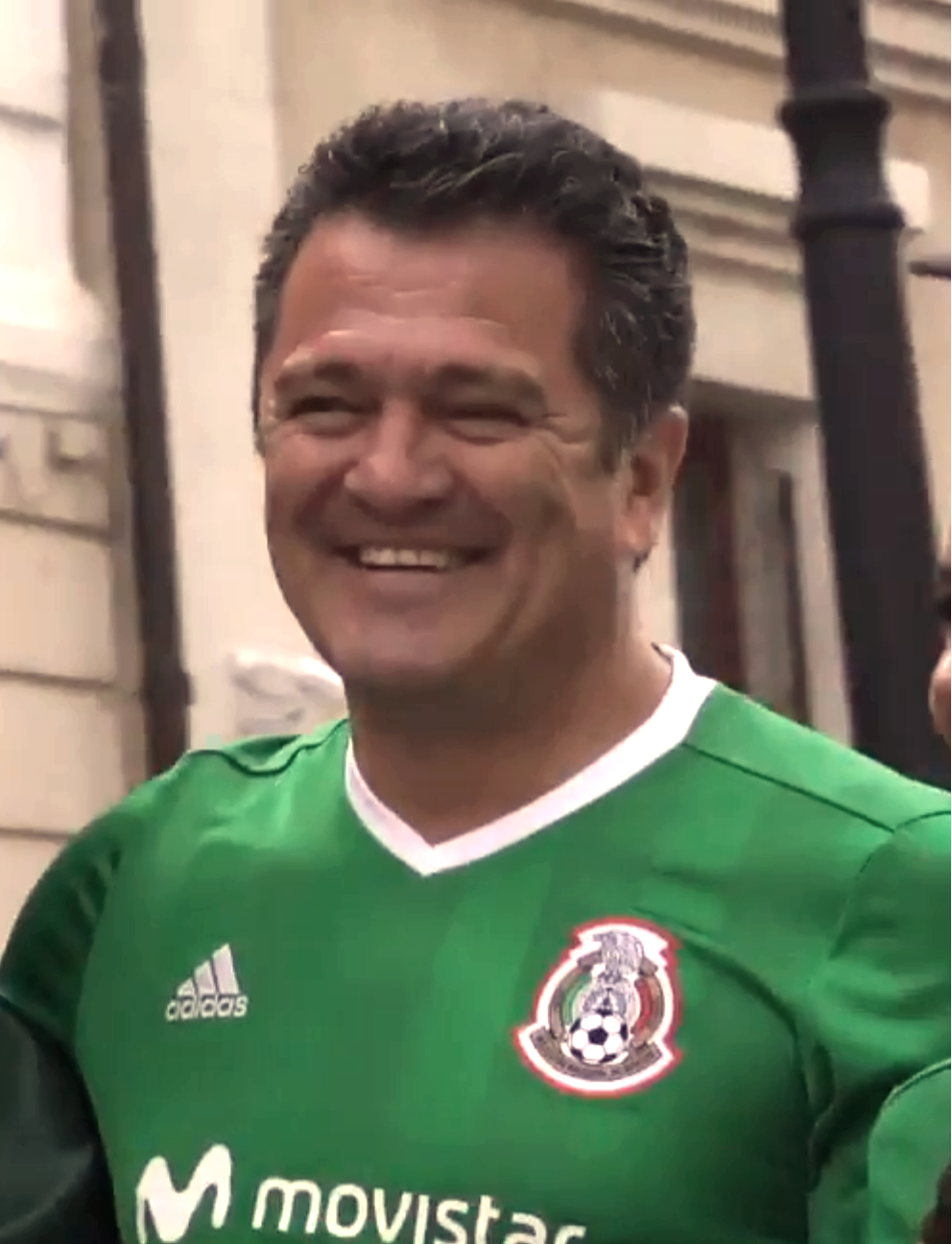
Carlos Hermosillo is Cruz Azul's all-time leading goalscorer, with 198 goals in all competitions.

Club de Futbol Cruz Azul is a Mexican professional association football club based in Mexico City, who currently play in Liga MX, Mexico's top division. Founded in 1927 in Ciudad Cooperativa Cruz Azul, Hidalgo, the club entered professional football in the Segunda División in 1961 and made its Primera División debut in 1964, and has competed in the top flight in every season since.

This list encompasses the major honours won by Cruz Azul and records set by the club, its managers and its players. The player records section includes details of the club's leading goalscorers and those who have made most appearances in first-team competitions. It also records notable achievements by Cruz Azul players on the international stage, and the highest transfer fees paid and received by the club. The list also includes the club's all-time records in domestic and international competitions, and its results in league finals. (Note: Only official competitive matches from the club's entry into professional football in 1961 onwards are included. League figures cover the regular phase only; Liguilla (play-off) matches are counted separately, following the presentation used by Liga MX and the RSSSF.)

The club has won ten league titles and a joint-record seven CONCACAF Champions Cups, and in 2001 became the first Mexican club to reach the final of the Copa Libertadores. The record for most appearances is held by Julio César Domínguez, with 655, while Carlos Hermosillo is the club's record goalscorer, with 198 goals in all competitions. Its most successful manager is Raúl Cárdenas, who won 11 trophies between 1966 and 1975.

All statistics are correct as of 14 October 2026.

== Honours ==
Cruz Azul have won honours both domestically and in international competitions. They have won the Mexican league title ten times, the fourth-highest total, and have never been relegated from the top flight. The club have also won a joint-record seven CONCACAF Champions Cups. After winning the Segunda División in 1963–64, the club won their first league title five seasons later, in 1968–69, and between 1971–72 and 1973–74 became the second Mexican club to win three consecutive league titles. In 2001 they became the first Mexican club to reach the final of the Copa Libertadores. Their most recent success came in 2026, when they won their fourth Campeón de Campeones, two months after their tenth league title.

Cruz Azul honours
| Type | Competition | Titles | Winning years | Runners-up | Source |
|---|---|---|---|---|---|
| Top division | Primera División/Liga MX | 10 | 1968–69, México 1970, 1971–72, 1972–73, 1973–74, 1978–79, 1979–80, Invierno 1997, Guard1anes 2021, Clausura 2026 | 1969–70, 1980–81, 1986–87, 1988–89, 1994–95, Invierno 1999, Clausura 2008, Apertura 2008, Apertura 2009, Clausura 2013, Apertura 2018, Clausura 2024 | |
| Top division | Copa México/Copa Presidente/Copa MX | 4 | 1968–69, 1996–97, Clausura 2013, Apertura 2018 | 1973–74, 1987–88 | |
| Top division | Campeón de Campeones | 4 | 1969, 1974, 2021, 2026 | 1972 | |
| Top division | Supercopa MX | 1 | 2019 | — | |
| Top division | Supercopa de la Liga MX | 1 | 2022 | — | |
| Promotion division | Segunda División | 1 | 1963–64 | — | |
| Intercontinental; FIFA | FIFA Derby of the Americas | 0 | — | 2025 | |
| Intercontinental; CONCACAF; CONMEBOL | Copa Interamericana | 0 | — | 1971 | |
| Continental; CONCACAF | CONCACAF Champions Cup/Champions League | 7 | 1969, 1970, 1971, 1996, 1997, 2013–14, 2025 | 2008–09, 2009–10 | |
| Continental; CONMEBOL | CONMEBOL Libertadores | 0 | — | 2001 | |
| Regional; North America; USSF–FMF | Leagues Cup | 1 | 2019 | — | |
| Regional; North America; USSF–FMF | Campeones Cup | 0 | — | 2021, 2026 | |

== Player records ==
Miguel Marín won all five league finals he played for Cruz Azul.

=== Titles ===
- Most titles won: Fernando Bustos, 13; followed by Héctor Pulido (12), Javier Sánchez (11) and Cesáreo Victorino (9)
- Most league finals won: Miguel Marín, 5, winning every league final he played for the club

=== Appearances ===
Julio César Domínguez holds the record for the most appearances made for Cruz Azul, with 655.

- Most appearances: Julio César Domínguez, 655
  - Domínguez broke the previous record of 551, held by Ignacio Flores, on 29 November 2020
- First foreign player: Alberto Quintano (Chile), debut on 4 December 1971
- Youngest first-team player: Martín Galván, 15 years, 8 months and 25 days, against Indios de Ciudad Juárez, Apertura 2008, the second-youngest debutant in Mexican top-flight history (Note: Récord gives 15 years, 8 months and 26 days.)
- Most appearances by a goalkeeper: José de Jesús Corona, 504

=== Most appearances ===
Competitive, professional matches only.

Players with most appearances for Cruz Azul
| Rank | Player | Years | Apps |
|---|---|---|---|
| 1 | (Mexico) Julio César Domínguez | 2006–2023 | 655 |
| 2 | (Mexico) Ignacio Flores | 1972–1990 | 551 |
| 3 | (Mexico) José de Jesús Corona | 2009–2023 | 504 |
| 4 | (Mexico) Héctor Pulido | 1963–1977 | 496 |
| 5 | (Mexico) Javier Guzmán | 1964–1978 | 482 |
| 6 | (Mexico) Óscar Pérez | 1993–2013; 2019 | 470 |

=== Goalscorers ===
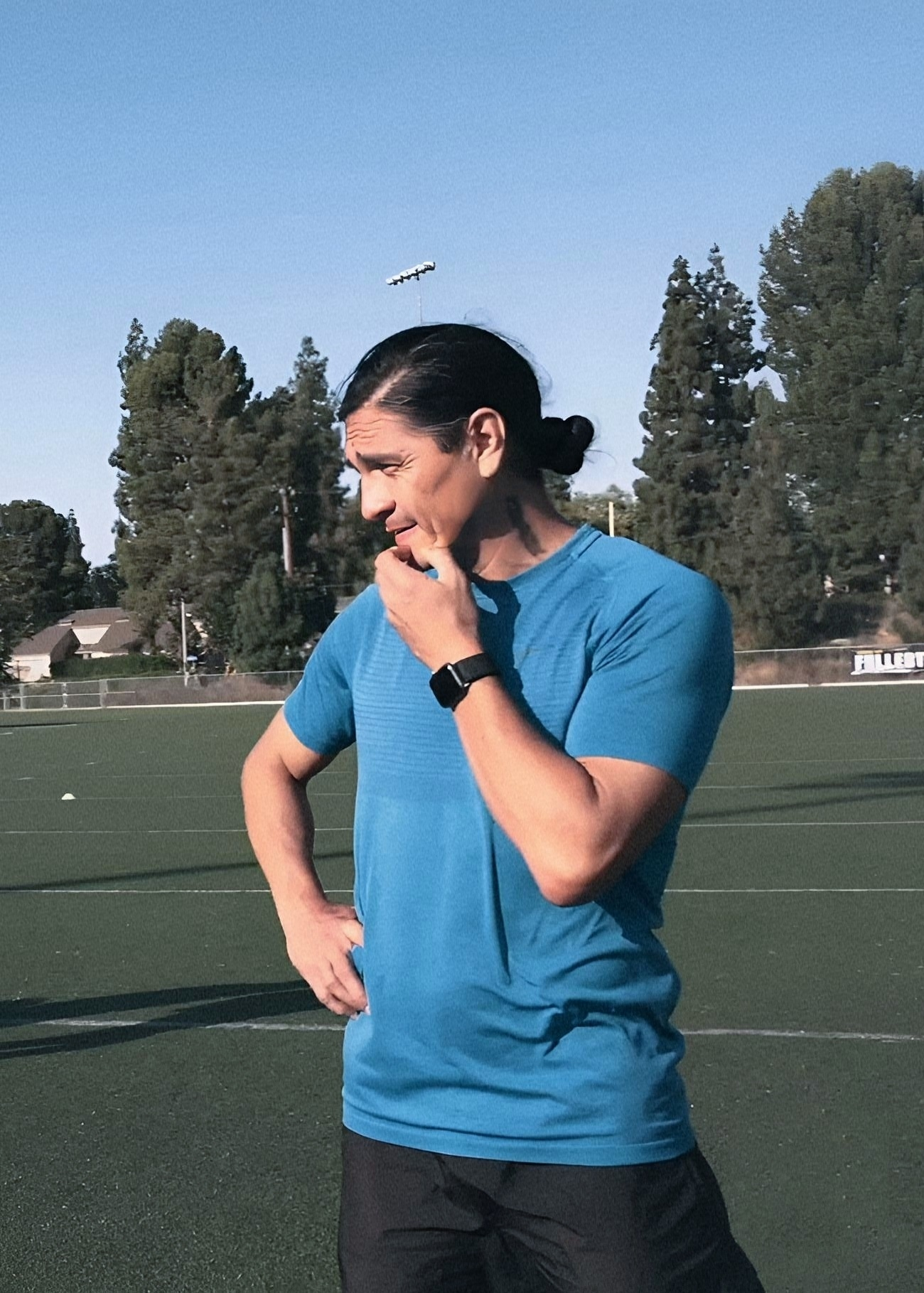
Francisco Palencia is Cruz Azul's all-time leading league goalscorer of the short-tournament era.

- Most goals in all competitions: Carlos Hermosillo, 198
- Most league goals: Carlos Hermosillo, 169 (155 in the regular phase and 14 in the Liguilla)
- Most league goals in a season: Carlos Hermosillo, 35, (in the 1994–95 season)
- Most Liguilla goals: Carlos Hermosillo, 14
- Most league goals in the short-tournament era: Francisco Palencia, 82 (Note: Récord gives 81.)
- Most goals in the CONCACAF Champions Cup: Javier Orozco, 23
- Fastest goal scored in a match: Ángel Sepúlveda, 25 seconds, (against Pumas UNAM, 26 October 2024)

=== Top goalscorers ===
Competitive, professional matches only.

Top goalscorers for Cruz Azul
| Rank | Player | Years | Goals |
|---|---|---|---|
| 1 | (Mexico) Carlos Hermosillo | 1991–1998 | 198 |
| 2 | (Mexico) Horacio López Salgado | 1971–1982 | 133 |
| 3 | (Mexico) Francisco Palencia | 1994–2003 | 110 |
| 4 | (Mexico) Fernando Bustos | 1963–1979 | 92 |
| 5 | (Paraguay) Eladio Vera | 1971–1977 | 81 |
| 6 | (Argentina) (Mexico) Christian Giménez | 2010–2018 | 72 |
| 7 | (Mexico) Pedro Duana | 1986–1995 | 71 |
| 8 | (Mexico) Adrián Camacho | 1977–1986 | 67 |
| 9 | (Argentina) Emanuel Villa | 2009–2012 | 66 |
| 10 | (Mexico) Octavio Muciño | 1969–1973 | 63 (Note: Other sources list Javier Orozco in tenth place with 63 goals; CONCACAF's official record credits him with 23 goals in the CONCACAF Champions Cup rather than 24, giving a total of 62.) |

==== Primera División/Liga MX ====
Since the club's Primera División debut in 1964, six Cruz Azul players have finished as the league's top scorer, winning the title nine times between them. Carlos Hermosillo is the only one to have done so three times, in consecutive seasons from 1993–94 to 1995–96, and his 35 goals in 1994–95 remain the club's single-season record.

Players who finished as league top scorer
| Player | Nationality | Season | Goals |
|---|---|---|---|
| Horacio López Salgado | Mexico | 1974–75 | 25 |
| Carlos Hermosillo | Mexico | 1993–94 | 27 |
| Carlos Hermosillo | Mexico | 1994–95 | 35 |
| Carlos Hermosillo | Mexico | 1995–96 | 26 |
| Sebastián Abreu | Uruguay | Verano 2002 | 19 |
| Emanuel Villa | Argentina | Apertura 2009 | 17 |
| Jonathan Rodríguez | Uruguay | Guard1anes 2020 | 12 |
| Uriel Antuna | Mexico | Clausura 2024 (Note: Joint top scorer.) | 8 |

==== Liguilla ====
Cruz Azul players have finished as the top scorer of the Liguilla in eleven seasons up to the Clausura 2026, most of them as joint top scorers. Hermosillo is the only player to have done so twice, while Luciano Figueroa's seven goals in the Clausura 2004 are the most scored by a Cruz Azul player who finished as Liguilla top scorer.

Players who finished as Liguilla top scorer
| Player | Nationality | Season | Goals |
|---|---|---|---|
| Octavio Muciño | Mexico | 1971–72 | 3 |
| Eladio Vera | Paraguay | 1973–74 | 3 |
| Adrián Camacho | Mexico | 1979–80 | 4 |
| Narciso Cuevas | Mexico | 1988–89 | 4 |
| Carlos Hermosillo | Mexico | 1991–92 | 5 |
| Carlos Hermosillo | Mexico | Invierno 1997 | 4 |
| Luciano Figueroa | Argentina | Clausura 2004 | 7 |
| Miguel Sabah | Mexico | Apertura 2008 | 2 |
| César Villaluz | Mexico | Apertura 2008 | 2 |
| Luis Romo | Mexico | Guard1anes 2020 | 3 |
| Lorenzo Faravelli | Argentina | Clausura 2024 | 2 |
| Christian Ebere | Nigeria | Clausura 2026 | 3 |

==== Copa México/Copa MX ====
In the Copa México/Copa MX, three Cruz Azul players have finished as the tournament's top scorer on four occasions, Hermosillo twice in consecutive editions.

Players who finished as cup top scorer
| Player | Nationality | Season | Goals |
|---|---|---|---|
| Carlos Hermosillo | Mexico | 1995–96 | 5 |
| Carlos Hermosillo | Mexico | 1996–97 | 9 |
| Joffre Guerrón | Ecuador | Clausura 2016 | 7 |
| Martín Cauteruccio | Argentina | Apertura 2018 | 6 |

==== CONCACAF Champions Cup/Champions League ====
Five Cruz Azul players have finished as the top scorer of the CONCACAF Champions Cup/Champions League, across five editions. Javier Orozco is the only one to have done so twice, and he is also the club's all-time top scorer in the competition, with 23 goals.

Players who finished as CONCACAF Champions Cup/Champions League top scorer
| Player | Nationality | Season | Goals |
|---|---|---|---|
| Octavio Muciño | Mexico | 1971 | 9 |
| Carlos Hermosillo | Mexico | 1997 | 3 |
| Benjamín Galindo | Mexico | 1997 | 3 |
| Javier Orozco | Mexico | 2008–09 | 7 |
| Javier Orozco | Mexico | 2010–11 | 11 |
| Ángel Sepúlveda | Mexico | 2025 | 9 |

=== International ===
==== FIFA World Cup ====
- First Cruz Azul player at a FIFA World Cup: Jesús del Muro for Mexico, at 1966 FIFA World Cup
- Most Cruz Azul players in a single World Cup: 5, 1970, all for Mexico (Juan Manuel Alejándrez, Gustavo Peña, Antonio Munguía, Javier Guzmán and Héctor Pulido)
- Players at a World Cup while at Cruz Azul: 32 (21 Mexican and 11 foreign), with the club represented at every World Cup from 1966 to 2026 except 1982
- Most foreign World Cup players of any Mexican club: 11 (4 Paraguayan, 2 Ecuadorian, 2 Uruguayan, 1 American, 1 Colombian and 1 Chilean)
- Only Primera División player at the 1990 World Cup: Santiago Ostolaza for Uruguay

==== FIFA Confederations Cup ====
- FIFA Confederations Cup winners while playing for Cruz Azul:
  - Óscar Pérez and Francisco Palencia, with Mexico in 1999.

==== CONCACAF Championship ====
- CONCACAF Championship winners while playing for Cruz Azul:
  - Hilario Díaz, with Mexico in 1965. (Note: Fernando Bustos was also registered, but as a reserve who did not travel to the tournament.)
  - Javier Sánchez and Octavio Muciño, with Mexico in 1971.
  - Javier Guzmán and Alacrán Jiménez, with Mexico in 1977.

==== CONCACAF Gold Cup ====
- CONCACAF Gold Cup winners while playing for Cruz Azul:
  - Óscar Pérez and Francisco Palencia, with Mexico in 1998.
  - Ricardo Osorio, Miguel Zepeda and Óscar Pérez with Mexico in 2003.
  - Gerardo Torrado and Fausto Pinto, with Mexico in 2009.
  - Gerardo Torrado, with Mexico in 2011.
  - Orbelín Pineda and Roberto Alvarado, with Mexico in 2019.
  - Carlos Rodríguez and Uriel Antuna, with Mexico in 2023.
  - Carlos Rodríguez, Érik Lira, Jesús Orozco, Jorge Sánchez and Ángel Sepúlveda, with Mexico in 2025.

==== CONCACAF Nations League ====
- CONCACAF Nations League winners while playing for Cruz Azul:
  - Carlos Rodríguez, Érik Lira, Jorge Sánchez, Alexis Gutiérrez and Ángel Sepúlveda, with Mexico in 2025. (Note: Sánchez, Gutiérrez and Sepúlveda were part of the squad for the quarter-finals against Honduras in November 2024 but not for the Finals in March 2025.)

=== Transfers ===
- Record transfer fee paid: Jonathan Rodríguez, from Santos Laguna, 2019, a reported €11.4 million (Note: Other reports give the fee as US$11.5–13 million.)
- Record transfer fee received: Iván Marcone, to Boca Juniors, 2019, a reported €7.5 million (Note: Other reports give the fee as US$8 million.)

== Managerial records ==
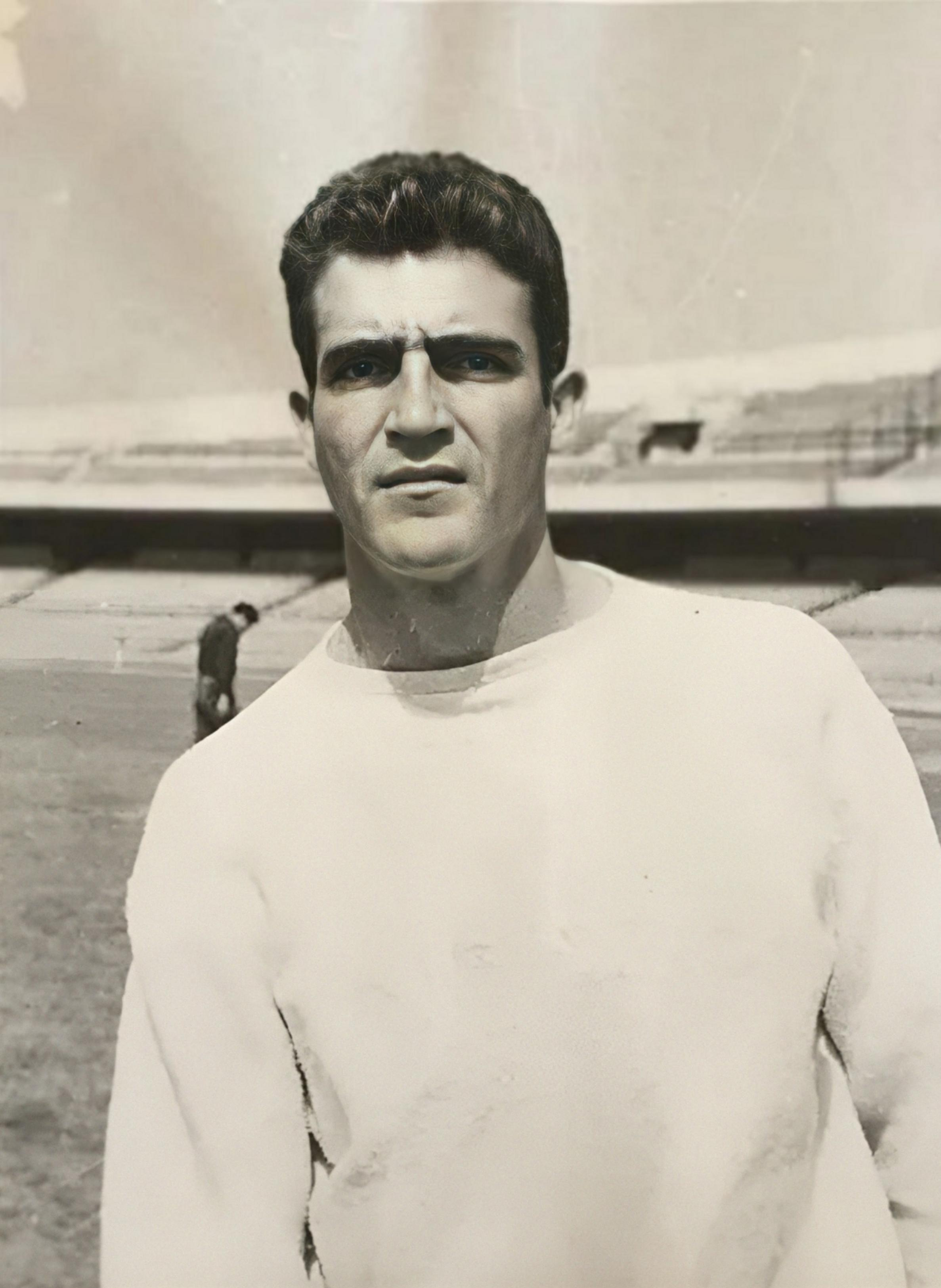
Raúl Cárdenas is Cruz Azul's most successful manager of all time.

- First manager: Paulino Sánchez, for the 1960–61 Copa de la Segunda División and the 1961–62 Segunda División season, from 1961 to 1962
- First manager in the Primera División: Jorge Marik, from 1964 to 1966
- First Mexican manager in the Primera División: Raúl Cárdenas, appointed in 1966
- Longest-serving manager by time: Raúl Cárdenas, nine years (1966–1975)
- Longest-serving manager by matches: Raúl Cárdenas managed the club for 327 matches over a period of nine years, from 1966 to 1975
- Fewest matches before winning a league title: 7, Joel Huiqui (Clausura 2026), the second-fewest by any manager in Mexican top-flight history
- Fewest matches before winning a trophy: 1, Diego Aguirre, who won the Supercopa de la Liga MX against Atlas in his first match in charge, on 26 June 2022
- Most matches managed: 327, Raúl Cárdenas
- Most league titles: 5, Raúl Cárdenas (1968–69, México 1970, 1971–72, 1972–73 and 1973–74)
- Most matches won as manager: 164, Raúl Cárdenas
- Most successful manager: Raúl Cárdenas, won 11 trophies with the club (five league titles, one Copa México, two Campeón de Campeones and three CONCACAF Champions Cups)

=== Trophy-winning managers ===
The following managers have won at least one trophy with Cruz Azul:

| Manager | Nationality | Period | Trophies | Total |
|---|---|---|---|---|
| Jorge Marik | Hungary | 1962–1966; 1976 | 1 Segunda División | 1 |
| Raúl Cárdenas | Mexico | 1966–1975 | 5 Primera División (Note: Including México 1970, for which Paulino Sánchez was interim manager during the first stage.); 1 Copa México; 2 Campeón de Campeones; 3 CONCACAF Champions' Cup | 11 |
| Ignacio Trelles | Mexico | 1976–1982 | 2 Primera División | 2 |
| Víctor Manuel Vucetich | Mexico | 1996–1997 | 1 Copa México | 1 |
| Luis Fernando Tena | Mexico | 1995–1996; 1997–2000; 2004; 2013–2015 | 1 Primera División; 3 CONCACAF Champions' Cup / Champions League | 4 |
| Guillermo Vázquez | Mexico | 2012–2013 | 1 Copa MX | 1 |
| Pedro Caixinha | Portugal | 2017–2019 | 1 Copa MX; 1 Supercopa MX | 2 |
| Robert Siboldi | Uruguay | 2009; 2019–2020 | 1 Leagues Cup (Note: Siboldi was in charge for the 2019 final; Pedro Caixinha managed the team in the earlier rounds.) | 1 |
| Juan Reynoso | Peru | 2021–2022 | 1 Liga MX; 1 Campeón de Campeones | 2 |
| Diego Aguirre | Uruguay | 2022 | 1 Supercopa de la Liga MX | 1 |
| Vicente Sánchez | Uruguay | 2025 | 1 CONCACAF Champions Cup | 1 |
| Joel Huiqui | Mexico | 2026– | 1 Liga MX; 1 Campeón de Campeones | 2 |

== Club records ==
=== Amateur era ===
Before turning professional, Cruz Azul played in the Primera División Amateur del Estado de Hidalgo from 1932 to 1961, with a team made up entirely of workers from the Cooperativa La Cruz Azul cement factory.

- First match in the Hidalgo amateur league: a win against Jilotepec in 1932, in which Cruz Azul scored 16 goals
- Primera División Amateur del Estado de Hidalgo titles: 15, between 1935 and 1960

=== Firsts ===
- First professional match: Cruz Azul 2–1 Zamora, Copa de la Segunda División, 2 April 1961
- Promotion to the Primera División: Cruz Azul 7–1 Zamora, 19 January 1964, clinching the Segunda División title
- First match in the top flight: Necaxa 1–0 Cruz Azul, 1963–64 Copa México, 23 February 1964
- First Primera División match: Monterrey 4–1 Cruz Azul, 6 June 1964

=== Wins ===
- Record win: 11–0 against Seattle Sounders, 1996 CONCACAF Champions' Cup final round, Guatemala City, 20 July 1997
- Most goals scored in a match: 12, in a 12–2 win against Leslie Verdes, 1988 CONCACAF Champions' Cup first round, second leg, Ciudad Cooperativa Cruz Azul, 20 April 1988
- Record league win: 7–0 against Veracruz, Primera División, 12 June 1976
- Most goals scored in a league match: 8, in an 8–2 away win against Toros Neza, 9 February 1993
- Record CONCACAF Champions League win: 8–0 against Arcahaie, 2021 CONCACAF Champions League round of 16, 14 April 2021

=== Defeats ===
- Record defeat: 0–7 against América in Apertura 2022, Estadio Azteca, 20 August 2022, 0–7 against Seattle Sounders FC in 2025 Leagues Cup Phase One, Lumen Field, 31 July 2025
- Record league defeat: 0–7 against América, Apertura 2022, 20 August 2022
- Record continental defeat: 1–6 against Fénix, 2003 Copa Libertadores group stage, 5 March 2003

=== Sequences ===
- Most consecutive league wins: 12, from 25 January to 10 April 2021 (Guard1anes 2021), equalling the Mexican top-flight record and surpassing the club's previous best of 10 from the 1971–72 season
- Longest unbeaten run (all competitions): 20 matches, 1997, under Luis Fernando Tena
- Longest unbeaten run in a single league tournament: 15 matches, Guard1anes 2021
- Longest run without a league win: 11 matches
- Most consecutive league matches scoring: 24, from 30 November 2025 to 16 May 2026, surpassing the previous club record of 23 set in 1991–92
- Longest unbeaten run at a single stadium: 31 matches (22 wins, 9 draws) at Estadio Olímpico Universitario, from the Apertura 2022 to the Apertura 2026, in league and international matches (Note: The run includes matches against Pumas UNAM, for whom the stadium is home, and those played there as Cruz Azul's home ground in the 2025 season.)
- Longest unbeaten home run in the league: 47 matches, 1979–1980, a Mexican top-flight record

=== Seasons ===
- Most trophies in a calendar year: 4, in 1969 (Primera División, Copa México, CONCACAF Champions' Cup and Campeón de Campeones), the only Mexican club to achieve this

==== Long seasons ====
- Most points (two points for a win): 55 (20 wins, 15 draws, 3 defeats), 1979–80
- Most points (three points for a win): 56 (14 wins, 14 draws, 6 defeats), 1995–96, the only long season played under three points for a win and the last before the league was split into short tournaments
- Fewest points: 26, 1965–66 (30 matches)
- Most wins: 22, 1971–72 (34 matches)
- Most away wins: 11, 1979–80, a Mexican top-flight record
- Fewest defeats: 3, in 1973–74 (34 matches) and 1979–80 (38 matches)
- Most goals scored: 91, 1994–95 (36 matches)
- Fewest goals conceded: 19, 1969–70 (30 matches)

==== Short tournaments ====
- Most points: 42 (13 wins, 3 draws, 1 defeat), Apertura 2024, a record for a 17-match Liga MX tournament; its 82.4 per cent of available points is the highest in Mexican top-flight history, and the previous club best was 41 in the Guard1anes 2021
- Fewest points: 13, Clausura 2009, finishing bottom of the table
- Most wins: 13, in the Guard1anes 2021 and the Apertura 2024, equalling the Mexican short-tournament record
- Most goals scored: 41, Invierno 1998
- Fewest defeats: 1, in the Invierno 1998 and the Apertura 2024
- Fewest goals conceded: 11, Guard1anes 2021
- Best goal difference: +27, in the Invierno 1998 and the Apertura 2024
- Most clean sheets: 9, in the Guard1anes 2021 and the Apertura 2024
- Unbeaten at home throughout a tournament: three times, in the Invierno 1998, the Apertura 2018 and the Apertura 2024
- Perfect home record: 9 wins from 9 home matches, Verano 1999, the only club to win all nine home matches in a short tournament; the club also won all eight in the Apertura 2010
- Scored in every match of a tournament: Apertura 2024, equalling a Mexican short-tournament record

Calendar years

- Most league points: 75, 2024 (33 in the Clausura and 42 in the Apertura), a Mexican record for two 17-match tournaments; the previous club best was 70 in 1998
- Fewest league goals conceded: 26, 2024 (regular phase), surpassing 28 in 2021

== Finals and Liguilla ==
- League titles: 10 – two decided on points (1968–69 and México 1970) and eight in finals
- League runners-up: 12 – once on points (1969–70) and 11 times in finals
- League finals contested: 19 (8 won, 11 lost)
- Liguilla appearances: 60, the second-most in Mexican football (Note: Counts appearances from the quarter-finals onwards. Cruz Azul were also eliminated in the qualifying round (repechaje or play-in) in the Verano 2002, Clausura 2003, Apertura 2021 and Clausura 2023.)
- Regular-phase first-place finishes: 13, including 8 in short tournaments; both are the second-highest totals in Mexican football
- Most finals against one opponent: 5, against América (1971–72, 1988–89, Clausura 2013, Apertura 2018 and Clausura 2024), the most-repeated final in Mexican football
- League finals in every decade: one of three clubs to have reached a league final in every decade since the introduction of the Liguilla in 1970
- Most consecutive Liguilla qualifications: 10, from 1971–72 to 1980–81; the most in short tournaments is 8, from the Clausura 2005 to the Apertura 2008
- Longest run without qualifying: 6 tournaments, from the Apertura 2014 to the Clausura 2017

=== League finals ===
Cruz Azul in league finals
| Season | Opponent | First leg | Second leg | Aggregate | Result |
|---|---|---|---|---|---|
| 1971–72 | América | 4–1 (Note: Single match, played at the Estadio Azteca on 9 July 1972.) | | | Won |
| 1972–73 | León | 1–1 | 0–0 | 1–1 (Note: Won the replay 2–1 after extra time at the Estadio Cuauhtémoc, Puebla.) | Won |
| 1973–74 | Atlético Español | 1–2 | 3–0 | 4–2 | Won |
| 1978–79 | Pumas UNAM | 0–0 | 2–0 | 2–0 | Won |
| 1979–80 | Tigres UANL | 1–0 | 3–3 | 4–3 | Won |
| 1980–81 | Pumas UNAM | 1–0 | 1–4 | 2–4 | Lost |
| 1986–87 | Guadalajara | 2–1 | 0–3 | 2–4 | Lost |
| 1988–89 | América | 2–3 | 2–2 | 4–5 | Lost |
| 1994–95 | Necaxa | 1–1 | 0–2 | 1–3 | Lost |
| Invierno 1997 | León | 1–0 | 1–1 (Note: Decided by a golden goal in extra time.) | 2–1 | Won |
| Invierno 1999 | Pachuca | 2–2 | 0–1 | 2–3 | Lost |
| Clausura 2008 | Santos Laguna | 1–2 | 1–1 | 2–3 | Lost |
| Apertura 2008 | Toluca | 0–2 | 2–0 | 2–2 (Note: After extra time; lost the penalty shoot-out.) | Lost |
| Apertura 2009 | Monterrey | 3–4 | 1–2 | 4–6 | Lost |
| Clausura 2013 | América | 1–0 | 1–2 | 2–2 | Lost |
| Apertura 2018 | América | 0–0 | 0–2 | 0–2 | Lost |
| Guard1anes 2021 | Santos Laguna | 1–0 | 1–1 | 2–1 | Won |
| Clausura 2024 | América | 1–1 | 0–1 | 1–2 | Lost |
| Clausura 2026 | Pumas UNAM | 0–0 | 2–1 | 2–1 | Won |

== Domestic record ==
- All-time regular-phase table: fourth, behind América, Guadalajara and Toluca
- All-time Liguilla table: second, behind América
- League and cup double: 1968–69, the club's only Campeonísimo
- Campeón de Campeones titles: 4 (1969, 1974, 2021 and 2026)

=== By competition ===
As of match played 25 July 2026

Cruz Azul record in domestic competitions (Note: Matches decided by a penalty shoot-out are counted as draws.)
| Competition | Pld | W | D | L | GF | GA | GD | Win% |
|---|---|---|---|---|---|---|---|---|
| Primera División/Liga MX (regular phase) | 2,188 | 950 | 680 | 558 | 3,410 | 2,537 | +873 | 43.42 |
| Liguilla (Note: Includes qualifying-round (repechaje) matches, which are excluded from the count of 60 Liguilla appearances given above.) | 247 | 101 | 57 | 89 | 316 | 316 | +0 | 40.89 |
| Extra play-off (Note: The 1969–70 play-off for second place against Veracruz, played at the Estadio Azteca on 4 January 1970 after both clubs finished level on 39 points; Cruz Azul won 3–2 on penalties after a 3–3 draw.) | 1 | 0 | 1 | 0 | 3 | 3 | +0 | 0.00 |
| League total | 2,436 | 1,051 | 738 | 647 | 3,729 | 2,856 | +873 | 43.14 |
| Segunda División (Note: League matches from 1961–62 to 1963–64; excludes the Copa de la Segunda División.) | 90 | 49 | 18 | 23 | 188 | 119 | +69 | 54.44 |
| Copa México/Copa Presidente/Copa MX | 188 | 93 | 43 | 52 | 286 | 203 | +83 | 49.47 |
| Campeón de Campeones (Note: Cruz Azul's 1968–69 title was awarded without a match, as the club had won both the league and the cup.) | 4 | 3 | 1 | 0 | 7 | 3 | +4 | 75.00 |
| Supercopa MX | 1 | 1 | 0 | 0 | 4 | 0 | +4 | 100.00 |
| Supercopa de la Liga MX | 1 | 0 | 1 | 0 | 2 | 2 | +0 | 0.00 |
| Total | 2,720 | 1,197 | 801 | 722 | 4,216 | 3,183 | +1033 | 44.01 |

== International record ==
- CONCACAF Champions Cup titles: 7 (1969, 1970, 1971, 1996, 1997, 2013–14 and 2025), a joint record shared with América
- CONCACAF Champions Cup consecutive titles: 3 (1969, 1970 and 1971), a joint-record
- CONCACAF Champions Cup runners-up: 2 (2008–09 and 2009–10)
- Most matches, wins, draws, goals and points by a Mexican club in the CONCACAF Champions Cup
- CONMEBOL Libertadores: runners-up in 2001, the first Mexican club to reach the final
- Leagues Cup: winners of the inaugural edition in 2019
- FIFA Club World Cup: fourth place in 2014

=== By competition ===
As of match played 16 September 2026

Cruz Azul record in international football by competition
| Competition | Pld | W | D | L | GF | GA | GD | Win% |
|---|---|---|---|---|---|---|---|---|
| CONCACAF Champions Cup/Champions League (Note: CONCACAF's totals to the end of the 2025 edition (119 matches: 69 won, 27 drawn, 23 lost; 271–94), plus the six matches of the 2026 edition: Vancouver FC 3–0 (away) and 5–0; Monterrey 3–2 (away) and 1–1; Los Angeles FC 0–3 (away) and 1–1.) | 125 | 72 | 29 | 24 | 284 | 101 | +183 | 57.60 |
| CONCACAF Cup Winners Cup | 2 | 1 | 1 | 0 | 3 | 2 | +1 | 50.00 |
| CONMEBOL Libertadores | 44 | 21 | 11 | 12 | 77 | 50 | +27 | 47.73 |
| Leagues Cup (Note: The 2019 edition was organised by Major League Soccer and Liga MX as an invitational tournament, before the competition was sanctioned by CONCACAF from 2023.) | 16 | 5 | 8 | 3 | 18 | 21 | −3 | 31.25 |
| Campeones Cup (Note: A single match between the MLS Cup winners and the Campeón de Campeones winners, organised by Major League Soccer and Liga MX as part of the same partnership as the Leagues Cup. Cruz Azul lost to Columbus Crew in 2021 and to Inter Miami CF in 2026, both 0–2.) | 2 | 0 | 0 | 2 | 0 | 4 | −4 | 0.00 |
| Copa Interamericana | 2 | 0 | 1 | 1 | 2 | 3 | −1 | 0.00 |
| FIFA Intercontinental Cup | 1 | 0 | 0 | 1 | 1 | 2 | −1 | 0.00 |
| FIFA Club World Cup | 3 | 1 | 1 | 1 | 4 | 6 | −2 | 33.33 |
| Total | 195 | 100 | 51 | 44 | 389 | 189 | +200 | 51.28 |
