= Cruz Azul in international football =

Mexican club in international football

- Club: Cruz Azul
- Seasons played: 26
- Most appearances: Julio César Domínguez (46) (Note: In the CONCACAF Champions Cup only.)
- Top scorer: Javier Orozco (23)
- First entry: 1969 CONCACAF Champions' Cup
- Latest entry: 2026 Campeones Cup

Titles
- Champions Cup: 7: 1969; 1970; 1971; 1996; 1997; 2013–14; 2025
- Leagues Cup: 1: 2019

Club de Futbol Cruz Azul is a Mexican professional football club based in Mexico City. The club has taken part in international competition since 1969, when it won the CONCACAF Champions' Cup in its first appearance. As of September 2026, Cruz Azul has played 195 matches in international club competitions organised by CONCACAF, CONMEBOL and FIFA, and in tournaments run jointly by Liga MX and Major League Soccer.

Cruz Azul has won the CONCACAF Champions Cup, formerly known as the Champions' Cup and the Champions League, seven times, a record it shares with América. It won three consecutive titles from 1969 to 1971 under Raúl Cárdenas, and two more in 1996 and 1997 under Luis Fernando Tena, who also led the club to its sixth title in 2013–14. Vicente Sánchez was the manager when the club won its seventh title in 2025. Cruz Azul was also runner-up in 2008–09 and 2009–10. Its 1969 and 1997 titles formed part of continental trebles alongside the league and the Copa México. As of 2026, Cruz Azul had played more matches, won more matches and scored more goals in the competition than any other Mexican club. (Note: Based on CONCACAF's figures to the end of the 2025 edition (Cruz Azul: 119 matches, 69 wins, 271 goals), plus Cruz Azul's six matches in the 2026 edition.) Javier Orozco, who scored 23 of his 24 goals in the competition for Cruz Azul, is the competition's all-time top scorer.

Outside CONCACAF, Cruz Azul became the first Mexican club to reach the final of the Copa Libertadores in 2001, losing to Boca Juniors on penalties, and also took part in the 2003 and 2012 editions. It was runner-up in the 1971 Copa Interamericana against Nacional, finished fourth at the 2014 FIFA Club World Cup and lost to Flamengo in the Derby of the Americas at the 2025 FIFA Intercontinental Cup. In the competitions organised jointly by Liga MX and Major League Soccer, the club won the inaugural Leagues Cup and was runner-up in the Campeones Cup in 2021 and 2026.

== History ==
=== 1969–1988: Early continental success ===
Cruz Azul qualified for the 1969 CONCACAF Champions' Cup as champions of the 1968–69 Primera División, with Raúl Cárdenas as manager. In the second round, the club lost 1–0 on aggregate to defending champions Toluca but advanced after Toluca were disqualified on 19 June for fielding three ineligible players. It then beat Saprissa 4–3 on aggregate in the semi-finals and faced Comunicaciones in the final. The second legs of both ties were played at the Estadio Azteca instead of the club's home ground, the Estadio 10 de Diciembre in Ciudad Cooperativa Cruz Azul. After a goalless first leg away, Cruz Azul won the second leg 1–0 on 30 September 1969 with a goal from Juan Manuel Alejándrez. It was the club's first continental title and completed a continental treble alongside the league and the Copa México.

Cruz Azul retained the title in 1970. After beating New York Greek American SC 6–0 on aggregate in the Northern Section, with Octavio Muciño scoring three of the goals, it was declared champion on 15 December 1970 when Saprissa and Transvaal, the winners of the Central American and Caribbean sections, withdrew.

The 1971 edition was decided by a six-team final tournament held in Guatemala City in March 1972. Cruz Azul qualified for it after Elizabeth S.C. forfeited the second leg of their Northern Section tie. The club was unbeaten in its five matches, which included a 9–0 win over SV Estrella and a 3–1 win over Comunicaciones, and finished level on eight points with Alajuelense. Cruz Azul won the resulting play-off 5–1 in Mexico City on 19 April 1972, with Eladio Vera and Muciño each scoring twice, to win a third consecutive title.

As CONCACAF champions, Cruz Azul played Nacional, the winners of the 1971 Copa Libertadores, in the 1971 Copa Interamericana. The first leg at the Estadio Azteca on 15 July 1972 ended 1–1, with Héctor Pulido scoring for Cruz Azul in the first minute. Nacional won the second leg 2–1 at the Estadio Centenario in Montevideo on 7 November to win the trophy.

Cruz Azul returned to the Champions' Cup in 1980 under Ignacio Trelles, who had led the club to consecutive league titles in 1978–79 and 1979–80. It beat Brooklyn Dodgers 12–3 on aggregate, with Adrián Camacho scoring four goals in the 9–1 first-leg win at Ciudad Cooperativa Cruz Azul, before losing 4–1 on aggregate to Pumas UNAM, the eventual champions, in the third round of the Northern Section. In 1981, the club beat Honduras's Real España 4–2 on aggregate and was eliminated in the second round by Marathón, also 4–2 on aggregate. Cruz Azul withdrew from the 1982 edition before its first-round tie against Xelajú. In 1988, it beat Leslie Verdes 14–2 and Seattle Mitre Eagles 9–0 on aggregate, before losing 2–1 on aggregate to Honduras's Olimpia, the eventual champions, in the fourth round of the North/Central Zone. The club did not take part in the competition again until 1996.

=== 1996–2001: Back-to-back CONCACAF titles and Libertadores final ===
Cruz Azul's next Champions' Cup appearance was in the 1996 edition, which was played from March 1996 to July 1997. After receiving byes in the first two rounds of the North/Central Zone, the club beat Victoria 2–1 and Alajuelense 5–2 on aggregate, with Carlos Hermosillo scoring three times in the two legs against Alajuelense. The final tournament was played as a four-team group in Guatemala City in July 1997. Under Luis Fernando Tena, Cruz Azul drew 1–1 with Necaxa, beat Comunicaciones 2–1 and defeated the Seattle Sounders 11–0 on 20 July, with Hermosillo and Julio César Yegros each scoring three goals. The club won the group by two points to claim its fourth continental title and its first since 1971.

Cruz Azul entered the 1997 edition as holders. It beat Comunicaciones 5–0 in a quarter-final played in Mexico City on 16 August, and the remaining rounds were held in Washington, D.C., where the club defeated Guadalajara 3–2 in the semi-finals. In the final at RFK Stadium on 24 August, Cruz Azul came from two goals down to beat the Los Angeles Galaxy 5–3, with Hermosillo scoring twice in the second half. It was Tena's second CONCACAF title in just over a month. The title also formed part of the club's second continental treble, alongside the league and the Copa México. Cruz Azul reached the final round of the 1997 CONCACAF Cup Winners Cup, played in March 1998, where it beat the Dallas Burn 2–1 and drew 1–1 with Necaxa, a match that also counted towards the Mexican league. Necaxa won the group on goal difference, and the final was never played. As holders, Cruz Azul received a bye to the final tournament of the 1998 Champions' Cup in Washington, D.C., where it was eliminated in the quarter-finals by Saprissa on penalties after a goalless draw on 11 August 1998.

In late 2000, Cruz Azul won a qualifying group of Mexican and Venezuelan clubs, finishing ahead of Atlante, Deportivo Táchira and Deportivo Italchacao, to qualify for the Copa Libertadores for the first time. Managed by José Luis Trejo, the club won its group in the 2001 Copa Libertadores with 13 points, ahead of São Caetano, Defensor Sporting and Olmedo. In the knockout stage, it beat Cerro Porteño 4–3 on aggregate after losing the first leg 2–1 in Asunción, eliminated River Plate 3–0 on aggregate after a goalless draw at the Estadio Monumental, and beat Rosario Central 5–3 on aggregate in the semi-finals. Cruz Azul was the first Mexican club to reach the final of the competition. Holders Boca Juniors won the first leg of the final 1–0 at the Estadio Azteca on 20 June 2001, in front of more than 110,000 spectators. Cruz Azul won the second leg 1–0 at La Bombonera on 28 June with a goal from Francisco Palencia, becoming the first team to beat Boca at home in a Copa Libertadores final, but lost the penalty shoot-out 3–1. Palencia was the club's top scorer in the campaign with seven goals.

=== 2002–2013: Libertadores quarter-final and consecutive CONCACAF finals ===
In 2003, Cruz Azul again qualified for the Copa Libertadores through the Mexico–Venezuela qualifying tournament. In the 2003 Copa Libertadores group stage, it lost 6–1 away to Fénix but advanced after winning all three of its home matches, including a 3–0 victory over Corinthians. The club eliminated Deportivo Cali on penalties after two goalless draws and was knocked out by Santos in the quarter-finals, 3–2 on aggregate. Palencia scored both of Cruz Azul's goals in the 2–2 home draw, and Robinho scored the only goal of the second leg. Palencia's eleven goals in the 2001 and 2003 editions made him the club's top scorer in the competition.

Cruz Azul returned to CONCACAF competition in the 2008–09 tournament, the first edition of the CONCACAF Champions League, having qualified as runners-up in the Clausura 2008. After beating Hankook Verdes 12–0 on aggregate in the preliminary round, the club finished second in its group behind Marathón and beat Pumas UNAM 2–0 on aggregate in the quarter-finals. In the semi-finals, it lost the first leg 2–0 to the Puerto Rico Islanders, won the second leg 3–1 after extra time on 7 April 2009 and advanced 4–2 on penalties. In the final, Atlante won the first leg 2–0 at the Estadio Azul on 22 April, and the second leg on 12 May ended goalless.

Enrique Meza, who became manager in 2009, led Cruz Azul to a second consecutive final in 2009–10. The club won its group without losing a match, beat Árabe Unido 4–0 on aggregate in the quarter-finals and overcame a 1–0 first-leg defeat to Pumas UNAM in the semi-finals with a 5–0 home win on 6 April 2010. In the final against Pachuca, Cruz Azul won the first leg 2–1 at home on 21 April but lost the second leg 1–0 a week later to a stoppage-time goal from Edgar Benítez, and Pachuca won the title on away goals. In 2010–11, Javier Orozco scored eleven goals, including four in a 5–4 group-stage win over Real Salt Lake, and Cruz Azul reached a third consecutive semi-final, which it lost 3–2 on aggregate to Monterrey, the eventual champions. By 2015, Cruz Azul and Monterrey were the only clubs to have reached three consecutive semi-finals in the Champions League format.

Meza also managed the club in the 2012 Copa Libertadores, in which Cruz Azul finished second in its group behind Corinthians, the eventual champions. In the round of 16, it drew 1–1 at home with Libertad and lost the second leg 2–0 in Asunción, going out 3–1 on aggregate.

=== 2014–2020: Sixth CONCACAF title, Club World Cup and Leagues Cup ===
Cruz Azul qualified for the 2013–14 CONCACAF Champions League as runners-up in the Clausura 2013 and won all four of its group matches against Herediano and Haiti's Valencia. Achille Emaná scored a hat-trick in the 3–0 home win over Valencia. In the quarter-finals, the club lost the first leg 1–0 away to Sporting Kansas City and won the second leg 5–1, with Mariano Pavone scoring three goals. It then beat Tijuana 2–1 on aggregate in the semi-finals after losing the first leg 1–0. In the final against Toluca, the first leg at the Estadio Azul on 15 April 2014 ended goalless. The second leg at the Nemesio Diez Stadium on 23 April ended 1–1, and Pavone's first-half goal gave Cruz Azul the title on away goals. It was the club's sixth CONCACAF title and its first since 1997, and Tena's third after the 1996 and 1997 titles.

As CONCACAF champions, Cruz Azul played in the 2014 FIFA Club World Cup in Morocco, its first appearance in the competition. It beat Asian champions Western Sydney Wanderers 3–1 after extra time in Rabat on 13 December 2014 and lost 4–0 to Real Madrid in the semi-finals in Marrakesh three days later. In the third-place match on 20 December, it drew 1–1 with Auckland City and lost the penalty shoot-out, finishing fourth. The club qualified for the 2014–15 Champions League with the best regular-season record in the Clausura 2014 but was eliminated in the group stage, finishing second behind Alajuelense with one win in four matches.

In 2019, Cruz Azul took part in the first Leagues Cup, an invitational tournament between Liga MX and Major League Soccer clubs. Under Pedro Caixinha, it beat Chicago Fire FC 2–0 on 23 July, in the competition's first match, and the LA Galaxy 2–1 in the semi-finals on 20 August. Cruz Azul beat Tigres UANL 2–1 in the final at Sam Boyd Stadium in Las Vegas on 18 September, with goals from Yoshimar Yotún, from a penalty, and Jonathan Rodríguez. It was Robert Siboldi's second match as manager.

Cruz Azul qualified for the 2020 CONCACAF Champions League as runners-up in the Apertura 2018. Under Siboldi, it beat Portmore United 2–1 away and 4–0 at the Estadio Azteca in the round of 16, before the competition was suspended because of the COVID-19 pandemic. In December 2020, Siboldi resigned after the club was eliminated in the Guardianes 2020 semi-finals, and Armando González, the coach of the under-20 team, was appointed on an interim basis. González managed Cruz Azul in the quarter-final against Los Angeles FC, played as a single match in Orlando on 16 December, which LAFC won 2–1 after Yotún had given Cruz Azul the lead.

=== 2021–present ===
Cruz Azul qualified for the 2021 CONCACAF Champions League as the best-placed team in the regular phase of the Clausura 2020, with Juan Reynoso as manager. After a goalless first leg against Arcahaie FC in Santo Domingo, it won the second leg 8–0, with eight different players scoring. The club beat Toronto FC 4–1 on aggregate in the quarter-finals, with Brayan Angulo scoring three of the goals, and lost 5–1 on aggregate to Monterrey, the eventual champions, in the semi-finals, including a 4–1 home defeat in the second leg on 16 September 2021. Later that month, as winners of the 2021 Campeón de Campeones, the club played in the 2021 Campeones Cup, losing 2–0 to the Columbus Crew on 29 September. In the 2022 edition, for which it qualified as Guardianes 2021 champions, Cruz Azul beat Forge FC 4–1 and CF Montréal 2–1 on aggregate, with Uriel Antuna scoring in both legs of the quarter-final, before losing 2–1 on aggregate to Pumas UNAM in the semi-finals.

The Leagues Cup was expanded in 2023 to include all Liga MX and Major League Soccer clubs and was sanctioned by CONCACAF. Under Ricardo Ferretti, Cruz Azul lost its first match of the 2023 edition 2–1 to Inter Miami CF on 21 July, a match in which Lionel Messi scored the winning goal in stoppage time on his debut for Inter Miami. Cruz Azul advanced from its group after beating Atlanta United FC on penalties but was eliminated in the round of 32 by Charlotte FC, also on penalties, after a goalless draw. In 2024, under Martín Anselmi, the club did not win a match in regulation time and was eliminated by Mazatlán on penalties in the round of 16 on 13 August.

Cruz Azul qualified for the 2025 CONCACAF Champions Cup as Clausura 2024 finalists, with Vicente Sánchez, who had replaced Anselmi at the start of 2025, as manager. The club beat Real Hope 7–0 and Seattle Sounders FC 4–1 on aggregate, then eliminated América 2–1 on aggregate in the quarter-finals, its first win over América in a two-legged international tie. In the semi-finals, it drew 1–1 away to Tigres UANL and won the second leg 1–0 with a penalty from Ángel Sepúlveda. Cruz Azul beat Vancouver Whitecaps FC 5–0 in the final at the Estadio Olímpico Universitario on 1 June 2025, with goals from Ignacio Rivero, Lorenzo Faravelli, Mateusz Bogusz and Sepúlveda, who scored twice. The title was the club's seventh in the competition, equalling América's record. It also qualified the club for the 2025 FIFA Intercontinental Cup and the 2029 FIFA Club World Cup.

Nicolás Larcamón was appointed manager after Sánchez left the club. In his fourth match in charge, Cruz Azul lost 7–0 to Seattle Sounders FC in its first match of the 2025 Leagues Cup, and the club was eliminated in the opening phase. On 10 December 2025, Cruz Azul played Copa Libertadores champions Flamengo in the Derby of the Americas of the Intercontinental Cup at the Ahmad bin Ali Stadium in Al Rayyan, Qatar. Giorgian de Arrascaeta gave Flamengo the lead and Jorge Sánchez equalised shortly before half-time, but a second goal from De Arrascaeta gave Flamengo a 2–1 win. Cruz Azul qualified for the 2026 CONCACAF Champions Cup as the best-placed team in the 2024–25 Liga MX overall standings. It beat Canadian club Vancouver FC 8–0 and Monterrey 4–3 on aggregate, but lost the first leg of the quarter-final 3–0 away to Los Angeles FC and was eliminated after a 1–1 draw in the second leg on 14 April 2026.

Larcamón left the club later that month and was replaced by Joel Huiqui, who led the club to the Clausura 2026 league title and the Campeón de Campeones. In the 2026 Leagues Cup, Cruz Azul won its first two matches, including a 2–1 win over New York City FC, but lost its final match of the opening phase 2–1 to Chicago Fire FC, who scored the winning goal in the 93rd minute. The club finished fifth among the Liga MX clubs and was eliminated. As Campeón de Campeones winners, Cruz Azul played in the 2026 Campeones Cup, losing 2–0 to Inter Miami CF in Miami on 16 September 2026.

== Overall record ==
=== By competition ===
As of match played 16 September 2026

Cruz Azul record in international football by competition (Note: Matches decided by penalty shoot-outs are counted as draws.)
Competition	Pld	W	D	L	GF	GA	GD	Win%
CONCACAF Champions Cup/Champions League (Note: CONCACAF's totals to the end of the 2025 edition (119 matches: 69 won, 27 drawn, 23 lost; 271–94), plus the six matches of the 2026 edition: Vancouver FC 3–0 (away) and 5–0; Monterrey 3–2 (away) and 1–1; Los Angeles FC 0–3 (away) and 1–1.)	125	72	29	24	284	101	+183	57.60
CONCACAF Cup Winners Cup	2	1	1	0	3	2	+1	50.00
CONMEBOL Libertadores (Note: Includes the Mexico–Venezuela qualifying tournaments played in 2000 and 2002.)	44	21	11	12	77	50	+27	47.73
Leagues Cup (Note: The 2019 edition was organised by Major League Soccer and Liga MX as an invitational tournament, before the competition was sanctioned by CONCACAF from 2023.)	16	5	8	3	18	21	−3	31.25
Campeones Cup (Note: A single match between the MLS Cup winners and the Campeón de Campeones winners, organised by Major League Soccer and Liga MX as part of the same partnership as the Leagues Cup. Cruz Azul lost to Columbus Crew in 2021 and to Inter Miami CF in 2026, both 0–2.)	2	0	0	2	0	4	−4	0.00
Copa Interamericana	2	0	1	1	2	3	−1	0.00
FIFA Intercontinental Cup	1	0	0	1	1	2	−1	0.00
FIFA Club World Cup	3	1	1	1	4	6	−2	33.33
Total	195	100	51	44	389	189	+200	51.28

=== By country ===
As of match played 16 September 2026

Cruz Azul record in international football by opponents' country
Country	Pld	W	D	L	GF	GA	GD	Win%
Argentina	6	3	2	1	9	4	+5	50.00
Australia	1	1	0	0	3	1	+2	100.00
Belize	4	4	0	0	26	2	+24	100.00
Bolivia	2	1	0	1	4	4	+0	50.00
Brazil	9	2	3	4	8	8	+0	22.22
Canada	11	8	2	1	24	5	+19	72.73
Colombia	2	0	2	0	0	0	+0	0.00
Costa Rica	17	11	5	1	38	14	+24	64.71
Ecuador	2	2	0	0	6	3	+3	100.00
Guatemala	5	4	1	0	11	2	+9	80.00
Haiti	6	5	1	0	20	1	+19	83.33
Honduras	10	2	3	5	10	12	−2	20.00
Jamaica	2	2	0	0	6	1	+5	100.00
Mexico	39	13	13	13	45	43	+2	33.33
Netherlands Antilles	1	1	0	0	9	0	+9	100.00
New Zealand	1	0	1	0	1	1	+0	0.00
Panama	8	7	0	1	24	3	+21	87.50
Paraguay	6	3	1	2	11	8	+3	50.00
Puerto Rico	4	2	1	1	8	6	+2	50.00
Spain	1	0	0	1	0	4	−4	0.00
Suriname	1	0	1	0	1	1	+0	0.00
United States	41	20	12	9	89	46	+43	48.78
Uruguay	6	2	1	3	11	12	−1	33.33
Venezuela	10	7	2	1	25	8	+17	70.00
Total	195	100	51	44	389	189	+200	51.28

=== By club ===
As of match played 16 September 2026

Cruz Azul record in international football by opponent
Club	Pld	W	D	L	GF	GA	GD	Win%
(Costa Rica) Alajuelense	6	4	2	0	15	6	+9	66.67
(Mexico) América	2	1	1	0	2	1	+1	50.00
(Panama) Árabe Unido	4	4	0	0	12	0	+12	100.00
(Haiti) Arcahaie FC	2	1	1	0	8	0	+8	50.00
(United States) Atlanta United FC	1	0	1	0	1	1	+0	0.00
(Mexico) Atlante	4	1	1	2	5	7	−2	25.00
(New Zealand) Auckland City	1	0	1	0	1	1	+0	0.00
(Argentina) Boca Juniors	2	1	0	1	1	1	+0	50.00
(United States) Brooklyn Dodgers	2	2	0	0	12	3	+9	100.00
(Paraguay) Cerro Porteño	2	1	0	1	4	3	+1	50.00
(Canada) CF Montréal	2	1	1	0	2	1	+1	50.00
(United States) Charlotte FC	2	0	2	0	0	0	+0	0.00
(United States) Chicago Fire FC	2	1	0	1	3	2	+1	50.00
(Panama) Chorrillo	2	1	0	1	3	1	+2	50.00
(United States) Colorado Rapids	1	0	1	0	2	2	+0	0.00
(United States) Columbus Crew	3	2	0	1	7	2	+5	66.67
(Guatemala) Comunicaciones	5	4	1	0	11	2	+9	80.00
(Brazil) Corinthians	4	1	1	2	3	2	+1	25.00
(United States) Dallas Burn	1	1	0	0	2	1	+1	100.00
(United States) D.C. United	2	2	0	0	3	0	+3	100.00
(Uruguay) Defensor Sporting	2	1	0	1	4	3	+1	50.00
(Colombia) Deportivo Cali	2	0	2	0	0	0	+0	0.00
(Venezuela) Deportivo Italchacao	2	2	0	0	6	1	+5	100.00
(Venezuela) Deportivo Táchira	4	2	1	1	9	3	+6	50.00
(United States) Elizabeth	2	1	1	0	2	0	+2	50.00
(Netherlands Antilles) Estrella	1	1	0	0	9	0	+9	100.00
(Venezuela) Estudiantes de Mérida	2	1	1	0	3	2	+1	50.00
(Uruguay) Fénix	2	1	0	1	5	6	−1	50.00
(Brazil) Flamengo	1	0	0	1	1	2	−1	0.00
(Canada) Forge FC	2	2	0	0	4	1	+3	100.00
(Mexico) Guadalajara	1	1	0	0	3	2	+1	100.00
(Costa Rica) Herediano	4	3	1	0	11	3	+8	75.00
(United States) Inter Miami CF	2	0	0	2	1	4	−3	0.00
(United States) LA Galaxy	3	2	1	0	8	5	+3	66.67
(Paraguay) Libertad	2	0	1	1	1	3	−2	0.00
(United States) Los Angeles FC	3	0	1	2	2	6	−4	0.00
(Honduras) Marathón	4	0	2	2	3	7	−4	0.00
(Mexico) Mazatlán	1	0	1	0	2	2	+0	0.00
(Mexico) Monterrey	6	1	2	3	7	11	−4	16.67
(Uruguay) Nacional	2	0	1	1	2	3	−1	0.00
(Paraguay) Nacional	2	2	0	0	6	2	+4	100.00
(Venezuela) Nacional Táchira	2	2	0	0	7	2	+5	100.00
(Mexico) Necaxa	2	0	2	0	2	2	+0	0.00
(United States) New York City FC	1	1	0	0	2	1	+1	100.00
(United States) New York Greek-Americans	2	2	0	0	6	0	+6	100.00
(Honduras) Olimpia	2	0	1	1	1	2	−1	0.00
(Ecuador) Olmedo	2	2	0	0	6	3	+3	100.00
(United States) Orlando City SC	1	0	1	0	0	0	+0	0.00
(Mexico) Pachuca	2	1	0	1	2	2	+0	50.00
(United States) Philadelphia Union	2	1	1	0	2	1	+1	50.00
(Jamaica) Portmore United	2	2	0	0	6	1	+5	100.00
Puerto Rico Islanders	4	2	1	1	8	6	+2	50.00
(Mexico) Pumas UNAM	10	3	2	5	10	10	+0	30.00
(Honduras) Real España	2	1	0	1	4	2	+2	50.00
(Haiti) Real Hope	2	2	0	0	7	0	+7	100.00
(Spain) Real Madrid	1	0	0	1	0	4	−4	0.00
(United States) Real Salt Lake	2	1	0	1	6	7	−1	50.00
(Argentina) River Plate	2	1	1	0	3	0	+3	50.00
(United States) Rochester Lancers	1	0	1	0	1	1	+0	0.00
(Argentina) Rosario Central	2	1	1	0	5	3	+2	50.00
(Panama) San Francisco	2	2	0	0	9	2	+7	100.00
(Brazil) Santos	2	0	1	1	2	3	−1	0.00
(Mexico) Santos Laguna	2	2	0	0	5	1	+4	100.00
(Brazil) São Caetano	2	1	1	0	2	1	+1	50.00
(Costa Rica) Saprissa	7	4	2	1	12	5	+7	57.14
(United States) Seattle Mitre Eagles	2	1	1	0	9	0	+9	50.00
(United States) Seattle Sounders	1	1	0	0	11	0	+11	100.00
(United States) Seattle Sounders FC	3	1	1	1	4	8	−4	33.33
(United States) Sporting Kansas City	2	1	0	1	5	2	+3	50.00
(Bolivia) The Strongest	2	1	0	1	4	4	+0	50.00
(Mexico) Tigres UANL	3	2	1	0	4	2	+2	66.67
(Mexico) Tijuana	2	1	0	1	2	1	+1	50.00
(Mexico) Toluca	4	0	3	1	1	2	−1	0.00
(Canada) Toronto FC	4	2	1	1	5	3	+2	50.00
(Suriname) Transvaal	1	0	1	0	1	1	+0	0.00
(Haiti) Valencia	2	2	0	0	5	1	+4	100.00
(Canada) Vancouver FC	2	2	0	0	8	0	+8	100.00
(Canada) Vancouver Whitecaps FC	1	1	0	0	5	0	+5	100.00
(Belize) Verdes FC	4	4	0	0	26	2	+24	100.00
(Honduras) Victoria	2	1	0	1	2	1	+1	50.00
(Australia) Western Sydney Wanderers	1	1	0	0	3	1	+2	100.00
Total	195	100	51	44	389	189	+200	51.28

== Matches ==
Note: Cruz Azul's score is always listed first.

Season	Competition	Round	Opponent	Home	Away	Agg.
1969	Champions' Cup	2R	(Mexico) Toluca	0–0	0–1	0–1 (Note: Toluca were disqualified on 19 June 1969 for fielding three ineligible players, and Cruz Azul advanced to the semi-finals.)
1969	Champions' Cup	SF	(Costa Rica) Saprissa	2–1	2–2	4–3
1969	Champions' Cup	Final	(Guatemala) Comunicaciones	1–0	0–0	1–0
1970	Champions' Cup	1R	(United States) New York Greek-Americans	5–0	1–0	6–0
1970	Champions' Cup	Final	Declared champions after (Costa Rica) Saprissa and (Suriname) Transvaal withdrew			
1971	Champions' Cup	1R	(United States) Elizabeth	2–0 (awd.) (Note: The second leg was awarded 2–0 to Cruz Azul after Elizabeth forfeited. Following CONCACAF, it is included in the club's overall record.)	0–0	2–0
1971	Champions' Cup	FT	(Suriname) Transvaal	1–1		Joint 1st out of 6 (Note: The final tournament was played in Guatemala City. Cruz Azul and Alajuelense finished level on eight points, and the title was decided by a play-off.)
1971	Champions' Cup	FT	(United States) Rochester Lancers	1–1		Joint 1st out of 6
1971	Champions' Cup	FT	(Netherlands Antilles) Estrella	9–0		Joint 1st out of 6
1971	Champions' Cup	FT	(Costa Rica) Alajuelense	3–1		Joint 1st out of 6
1971	Champions' Cup	FT	(Guatemala) Comunicaciones	—	3–1	Joint 1st out of 6
1971	Champions' Cup	PO	(Costa Rica) Alajuelense	5–1	—	—
1971	Copa Interamericana	Final	(Uruguay) Nacional	1–1	1–2	2–3
1980	Champions' Cup	1R	Bye			
1980	Champions' Cup	2R	(United States) Brooklyn Dodgers	9–1	3–2	12–3
1980	Champions' Cup	3R	(Mexico) Pumas UNAM	1–3	0–1	1–4
1981	Champions' Cup	1R	(Honduras) Real España	3–0	1–2	4–2
1981	Champions' Cup	2R	(Honduras) Marathón	1–3	1–1	2–4
1982	Champions' Cup	1R	(Guatemala) Xelajú	Withdrew		
1988	Champions' Cup	1R	(Belize) Leslie Verdes	12–2	2–0	14–2
1988	Champions' Cup	2R	(United States) Seattle Mitre Eagles	9–0	0–0 (Note: Both legs were played in Ciudad Cooperativa Cruz Azul.)	9–0
1988	Champions' Cup	4R	(Honduras) Olimpia	1–2	0–0	1–2
1996	Champions' Cup	1R	Bye			
1996	Champions' Cup	2R	Bye			
1996	Champions' Cup	3R	(Honduras) Victoria	2–0	0–1	2–1
1996	Champions' Cup	4R	(Costa Rica) Alajuelense	3–2	2–0	5–2
1996	Champions' Cup	FT	(Mexico) Necaxa	1–1		1st out of 4 (Note: The final tournament was played in Guatemala City in July 1997.)
1996	Champions' Cup	FT	(Guatemala) Comunicaciones	—	2–1	1st out of 4
1996	Champions' Cup	FT	(United States) Seattle Sounders	11–0		1st out of 4
1997	Champions' Cup	QF	(Guatemala) Comunicaciones	5–0	—	—
1997	Champions' Cup	SF	(Mexico) Guadalajara	3–2		—
1997	Champions' Cup	Final	(United States) Los Angeles Galaxy	5–3		—
1997	Cup Winners Cup	GS	(United States) Dallas Burn	—	2–1	2nd out of 3 (Note: The tournament was abandoned before the final was played.)
1997	Cup Winners Cup	GS	(Mexico) Necaxa	1–1	—	2nd out of 3
1998	Champions' Cup	QF	(Costa Rica) Saprissa	0–0		0–0 (3–5 p)
2001	Copa Libertadores	QS	(Mexico) Atlante	1–3	4–2	1st out of 4 (Note: Mexico–Venezuela qualifying tournament, played in 2000.)
2001	Copa Libertadores	QS	(Venezuela) Deportivo Italchacao	4–1	2–0	1st out of 4
2001	Copa Libertadores	QS	(Venezuela) Deportivo Táchira	4–1	0–1	1st out of 4
2001	Copa Libertadores	GS	(Brazil) São Caetano	1–0	1–1	1st out of 4
2001	Copa Libertadores	GS	(Uruguay) Defensor Sporting	2–0	2–3	1st out of 4
2001	Copa Libertadores	GS	(Ecuador) Olmedo	3–1	3–2	1st out of 4
2001	Copa Libertadores	R16	(Paraguay) Cerro Porteño	3–1	1–2	4–3
2001	Copa Libertadores	QF	(Argentina) River Plate	3–0	0–0	3–0
2001	Copa Libertadores	SF	(Argentina) Rosario Central	2–0	3–3	5–3
2001	Copa Libertadores	Final	(Argentina) Boca Juniors	0–1	1–0	1–1 (1–3 p)
2003	Copa Libertadores	QS	(Mexico) Pumas UNAM	0–2	1–1	2nd out of 4 (Note: Mexico–Venezuela qualifying tournament, played in 2002.)
2003	Copa Libertadores	QS	(Venezuela) Estudiantes de Mérida	2–1	1–1	2nd out of 4
2003	Copa Libertadores	QS	(Venezuela) Nacional Táchira	4–0	3–2 (Note: Played in Mérida.)	2nd out of 4
2003	Copa Libertadores	GS	(Brazil) Corinthians	3–0	0–1	2nd out of 4
2003	Copa Libertadores	GS	(Bolivia) The Strongest	3–2	1–2	2nd out of 4
2003	Copa Libertadores	GS	(Uruguay) Fénix	4–0	1–6	2nd out of 4
2003	Copa Libertadores	R16	(Colombia) Deportivo Cali	0–0	0–0	0–0 (3–2 p)
2003	Copa Libertadores	QF	(Brazil) Santos	2–2	0–1	2–3
2008–09	Champions League	PR	(Belize) Hankook Verdes	6–0	6–0 (Note: Played in Guatemala City.)	12–0
2008–09	Champions League	GS	(Honduras) Marathón	1–1	0–2	2nd out of 4
2008–09	Champions League	GS	(Costa Rica) Saprissa	4–0	0–1	2nd out of 4
2008–09	Champions League	GS	(United States) D.C. United	2–0	1–0	2nd out of 4
2008–09	Champions League	QF	(Mexico) Pumas UNAM	1–0	1–0	2–0
2008–09	Champions League	SF	Puerto Rico Islanders	3–1 (a.e.t.)	0–2	3–3 (4–2 p)
2008–09	Champions League	Final	(Mexico) Atlante	0–2	0–0	0–2
2009–10	Champions League	PR	(Costa Rica) Herediano	0–0	6–2	6–2
2009–10	Champions League	GS	(Costa Rica) Saprissa	2–0	2–1	1st out of 4
2009–10	Champions League	GS	(United States) Columbus Crew	5–0	2–0	1st out of 4
2009–10	Champions League	GS	Puerto Rico Islanders	2–0	3–3	1st out of 4
2009–10	Champions League	QF	(Panama) Árabe Unido	3–0	1–0	4–0
2009–10	Champions League	SF	(Mexico) Pumas UNAM	5–0	0–1	5–1
2009–10	Champions League	Final	(Mexico) Pachuca	2–1	0–1	2–2 (a)
2010–11	Champions League	PR	(Panama) San Francisco	6–0	3–2	9–2
2010–11	Champions League	GS	(Canada) Toronto FC	0–0	1–2	2nd out of 4
2010–11	Champions League	GS	(United States) Real Salt Lake	5–4	1–3	2nd out of 4
2010–11	Champions League	GS	(Panama) Árabe Unido	2–0	6–0	2nd out of 4
2010–11	Champions League	QF	(Mexico) Santos Laguna	2–0	3–1	5–1
2010–11	Champions League	SF	(Mexico) Monterrey	1–1	1–2	2–3
2012	Copa Libertadores	GS	(Paraguay) Club Nacional	4–1	2–1	2nd out of 4
2012	Copa Libertadores	GS	(Venezuela) Deportivo Táchira	4–0	1–1	2nd out of 4
2012	Copa Libertadores	GS	(Brazil) Corinthians	0–0	0–1	2nd out of 4
2012	Copa Libertadores	R16	(Paraguay) Libertad	1–1	0–2	1–3
2013–14	Champions League	GS	(Costa Rica) Herediano	3–0	2–1	1st out of 3
2013–14	Champions League	GS	(Haiti) Valencia	3–0	2–1	1st out of 3
2013–14	Champions League	QF	(United States) Sporting Kansas City	5–1	0–1	5–2
2013–14	Champions League	SF	(Mexico) Tijuana	2–0	0–1	2–1
2013–14	Champions League	Final	(Mexico) Toluca	0–0	1–1	1–1 (a)
2014–15	Champions League	GS	(Costa Rica) Alajuelense	1–1	1–1	2nd out of 3
2014–15	Champions League	GS	(Panama) Chorrillo	3–0	0–1	2nd out of 3
2014–15	Club World Cup	QF	(Australia) Western Sydney Wanderers	3–1 (a.e.t.)		—
2014–15	Club World Cup	SF	(Spain) Real Madrid	0–4		—
2014–15	Club World Cup	3P	(New Zealand) Auckland City	1–1 (a.e.t.)		1–1 (2–4 p)
2019	Leagues Cup	QF	(United States) Chicago Fire	—	2–0	—
2019	Leagues Cup	SF	(United States) LA Galaxy	—	2–1	—
2019	Leagues Cup	Final	(Mexico) Tigres UANL	2–1		—
2020	Champions League	R16	(Jamaica) Portmore United	4–0	2–1	6–1
2020	Champions League	QF	(United States) Los Angeles FC	1–2		— (Note: Played as a single match in Orlando, Florida, after the competition was suspended because of the COVID-19 pandemic.)
2021	Champions League	R16	(Haiti) Arcahaie FC	8–0	0–0 (Note: Played in Santo Domingo.)	8–0
2021	Champions League	QF	(Canada) Toronto FC	1–0	3–1 (Note: Played in Tampa, Florida.)	4–1
2021	Champions League	SF	(Mexico) Monterrey	1–4	0–1	1–5
2021	Campeones Cup	Final	(United States) Columbus Crew	—	0–2	—
2022	Champions League	R16	(Canada) Forge FC	3–1	1–0	4–1
2022	Champions League	QF	(Canada) CF Montréal	1–0	1–1	2–1
2022	Champions League	SF	(Mexico) Pumas UNAM	0–0	1–2	1–2
2023	Leagues Cup	GS	(United States) Inter Miami CF	—	1–2	2nd out of 3 (Note: Group matches level after 90 minutes were decided by a penalty shoot-out, the winner earning an extra point. Cruz Azul beat Atlanta United FC 5–4 on penalties.)
2023	Leagues Cup	GS	(United States) Atlanta United FC	—	1–1	2nd out of 3
2023	Leagues Cup	R32	(United States) Charlotte FC	—	0–0	0–0 (3–4 p)
2024	Leagues Cup	GS	(United States) Charlotte FC	—	0–0	2nd out of 3 (Note: Cruz Azul lost 2–4 to Charlotte FC and beat Philadelphia Union 5–3 in the penalty shoot-outs that followed both group matches.)
2024	Leagues Cup	GS	(United States) Philadelphia Union	—	1–1	2nd out of 3
2024	Leagues Cup	R32	(United States) Orlando City SC	—	0–0	0–0 (5–4 p)
2024	Leagues Cup	R16	(Mexico) Mazatlán	2–2		2–2 (1–3 p) (Note: Played at Audi Field in Washington, D.C.)
2025	Champions Cup	1R	(Haiti) Real Hope	5–0	2–0	7–0
2025	Champions Cup	R16	(United States) Seattle Sounders FC	4–1	0–0	4–1
2025	Champions Cup	QF	(Mexico) América	2–1	0–0	2–1
2025	Champions Cup	SF	(Mexico) Tigres UANL	1–0	1–1	2–1
2025	Champions Cup	Final	(Canada) Vancouver Whitecaps FC	5–0	—	—
2025	Leagues Cup	LP	(United States) Seattle Sounders FC	—	0–7	12th out of 18 (Note: Cruz Azul won the penalty shoot-outs that followed both draws, earning an extra point each time.)
2025	Leagues Cup	LP	(United States) LA Galaxy	—	1–1	12th out of 18
2025	Leagues Cup	LP	(United States) Colorado Rapids	—	2–2	12th out of 18
2025	Intercontinental Cup	DA	(Brazil) Flamengo	1–2		— (Note: Played at the Ahmad bin Ali Stadium in Al Rayyan, Qatar.)
2026	Champions Cup	1R	(Canada) Vancouver FC	5–0	3–0	8–0
2026	Champions Cup	R16	(Mexico) Monterrey	1–1	3–2	4–3
2026	Champions Cup	QF	(United States) Los Angeles FC	1–1	0–3	1–4
2026	Leagues Cup	LP	(United States) Philadelphia Union	—	1–0	5th out of 18
2026	Leagues Cup	LP	(United States) New York City FC	—	2–1	5th out of 18
2026	Leagues Cup	LP	(United States) Chicago Fire FC	—	1–2	5th out of 18
2026	Campeones Cup	Final	(United States) Inter Miami CF	—	0–2	—

== Statistics ==
=== CONCACAF Champions Cup ===
==== Top scorers ====
As of end of the 2026 edition

Cruz Azul's top scorers in the CONCACAF Champions Cup
Rank	Player	Goals
1	(Mexico) Javier Orozco	23
2	(Mexico) Octavio Muciño	12
3	(Argentina) Emanuel Villa	11
4	(Mexico) Carlos Hermosillo	10
5	(Mexico) Ángel Sepúlveda	9

==== Other records ====
Orozco is the competition's all-time top scorer, with 24 goals, 23 of them for Cruz Azul. He also holds the records for the most goals in a single edition, with eleven in 2010–11, and the most hat-tricks, with four, all scored for Cruz Azul. As of the start of the 2026 edition, Julio César Domínguez had made 46 appearances in the competition, all for Cruz Azul, the fourth-highest total in its history; the record of 50 was held by Javier Aquino, who played in it for Cruz Azul and Tigres UANL. Since the competition adopted its Champions League format in 2008–09, José de Jesús Corona has made the most saves for the club, with 66, and Alejandro Vela has provided the most assists, with eleven.

=== Copa Libertadores top scorers ===
Cruz Azul's top scorers in the Copa Libertadores (Note: Excludes the Mexico–Venezuela qualifying tournaments played in 2000 and 2002.)
Rank	Player	Goals	Editions
1	(Mexico) Francisco Palencia	11	2001, 2003
2	(Mexico) Javier Orozco	5	2012
3	(Paraguay) José Saturnino Cardozo	4	2001

=== Hat-tricks ===
Hat-tricks scored for Cruz Azul in international competition
No.	Player	Goals	Opponent	Result	Venue	Competition	Date	Ref.
1	Octavio Muciño	3	(Netherlands Antilles) Estrella	9–0	Neutral	1971 Champions' Cup	21 March 1972	
2	Daniel Astegiano	3	(United States) Brooklyn Dodgers	9–1	Home	1980 Champions' Cup	10 September 1980	
3	Adrián Camacho	4	(United States) Brooklyn Dodgers	9–1	Home	1980 Champions' Cup	10 September 1980	
4	Miguel Ángel Gómez	3	(Belize) Leslie Verdes	12–2	Home	1988 Champions' Cup	20 April 1988	
5	Martín Gálvez	4	(United States) Seattle Mitre Eagles	9–0	Home	1988 Champions' Cup	11 May 1988	
6	Carlos Hermosillo	3	(United States) Seattle Sounders	11–0	Neutral	1996 Champions' Cup	20 July 1997	
7	Julio César Yegros	3	(United States) Seattle Sounders	11–0	Neutral	1996 Champions' Cup	20 July 1997	
8	Javier Orozco	3	(Belize) Hankook Verdes	6–0	Home	2008–09 Champions League	26 August 2008	
9	Javier Orozco	3	(Costa Rica) Herediano	6–2	Away	2009–10 Champions League	30 July 2009	
10	Jaime Lozano	3	(United States) Columbus Crew	5–0	Home	2009–10 Champions League	26 August 2009	
11	Emanuel Villa	3	(Panama) San Francisco	3–2	Away	2010–11 Champions League	27 July 2010	
12	Javier Orozco	3	(Panama) San Francisco	6–0	Home	2010–11 Champions League	3 August 2010	
13	Javier Orozco	4	(United States) Real Salt Lake	5–4	Home	2010–11 Champions League	25 August 2010	
14	Javier Orozco	3	(Panama) Árabe Unido	6–0	Away	2010–11 Champions League	15 September 2010	
15	Achille Emaná	3	(Haiti) Valencia	3–0	Home	2013–14 Champions League	24 September 2013	
16	Mariano Pavone	3	(United States) Sporting Kansas City	5–1	Home	2013–14 Champions League	19 March 2014	
17	Luka Romero	3	(Canada) Vancouver FC	5–0	Home	2026 Champions Cup	12 February 2026	

== Honours ==
Cruz Azul honours in international competitions
Type	Competition	Titles	Seasons won	Runners-up
Continental	CONCACAF Champions Cup/Champions League	7	1969, 1970, 1971, 1996, 1997, 2013–14, 2025	2008–09, 2009–10
Continental	CONMEBOL Libertadores	0	—	2001
Intercontinental	FIFA Derby of the Americas	0	—	2025
Intercontinental	Copa Interamericana	0	—	1971
Liga MX–MLS	Leagues Cup	1	2019	—
Liga MX–MLS	Campeones Cup	0	—	2021, 2026

== See also ==
- List of Cruz Azul records and statistics
- List of Cruz Azul seasons
