= Octavio Muciño =

Mexican football player (1950–1974)

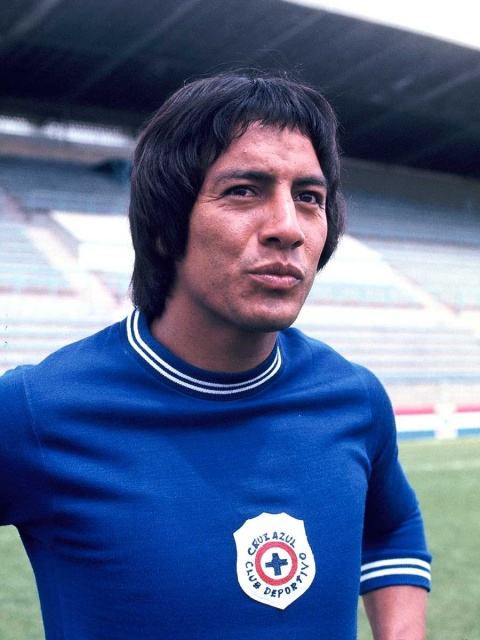
- Muciño in 1972

Personal information
- Full name: Octavio Muciño Valdés
- Date of birth: 14 May 1950
- Place of birth: Jasso, Hidalgo, Mexico
- Date of death: 3 June 1974 (aged 24)
- Place of death: Colonia Ayuntamiento, Guadalajara, Mexico
- Positions: Centre-forward; midfielder

Youth career
- 1957–1969: Cruz Azul

Senior career*
Years	Team	Apps	(Gls)
1969–1973	Cruz Azul	116	(51)
1973–1974	Guadalajara	26	(15)

International career
1971–1973	Mexico	16	(7)
Medal record
Men's football
Representing Mexico
CONCACAF Championship
Winner	1971 Trinidad and Tobago
Third place	1973 Haiti
- * Club domestic league appearances and goals

Octavio Muciño Valdés (14 May 1950 – 3 June 1974) was a Mexican professional footballer who played as a centre-forward and midfield for Cruz Azul and Guadalajara as well as the Mexico national football team.

Muciño was born in Jasso, Hidalgo where he played in Cruz Azul's youth academy until his debut with the senior team in 1969. During his time at Cruz Azul, Muciño won three league titles and two continental cups. His only season with Guadalajara, he managed to become the team's top goal scorer with 15 goals. At the time of his death, Muciño was regarded as a key player for the Mexico national football team alongside Enrique Borja. Along with Borja, Muciño is often cited to be one of the greatest Mexican forwards of his generation.

In the early hours of 31 May 1974, Muciño was shot three times outside of a restaurant by 32-year old Jaime Antonio Muldoon Barreto, an engineer with whom he had a physical confrontation earlier in the evening. Muciño succumbed to his injuries and died three days later at a hospital in Guadalajara. Muldoon Barreto left for Europe shortly after and never stood trial for the murder when he returned to Mexico years later. Muldoon Barreto's freedom is widely attributed to his family's high status and ties with the government of Jalisco.

== Early life ==
Octavio Muciño Valdés was born to Roberto Muciño Martínez, a mechanic, and Genoveva Valdés in Jasso, Hidalgo on 14 May 1950. He had two brothers and one sister. His father, Roberto Muciño Martínez, was also a footballer who played for Cruz Azul during both the club's amateur and professional eras. Muciño Martínez was part of the squad which won the club's promotional title in the 1963–64 season and subsequently played in the Primera División de México. Muciño Valdés was encouraged by his father to pursue a career in football.

== Club career ==
=== Cruz Azul ===
Muciño had enrolled in Cruz Azul's youth team at the age of 7. At the age of 19, he was debuted with the senior team during the 1969–70 Mexican Primera División season against C.F. Monterrey on 19 November 1969. Muciño scored his first senior league goal on 29 March 1970 in the México 1970 tournament against Laguna. Cruz Azul went on to win the México 1970 competition, with Muciño netting a total of 14 league goals at the end of the season.

=== Guadalajara ===
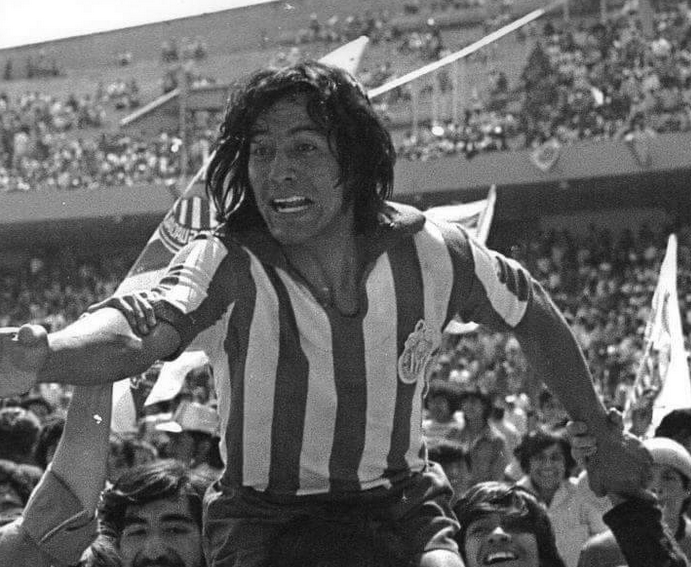
Muciño being carried by Guadalajara fans during a pitch invasion vs UNAM, 10 February 1974

In 1973, Muciño was transferred to C.D. Guadalajara for a fee of about 1 million pesos.

The team had been undergoing poor performances in the league for a number of seasons at this point, ending the 1973–74 season 11th on the general table. In spite of this, Muciño established himself as a fan favorite and key player, netting 15 goals in 26 games becoming the team's top goal scorer.

Muciño played his final match with Guadalajara on 21 April 1971 in a 1-0 loss against Club Jalisco.

At the time of his death, there had been transfer negotiations between Guadalajara and Atlas where Muciño would be exchanged for Ricardo Chavarín.

== Personal life ==
Muciño was nicknamed El Centavo due to his small stature as a child. He had one child, Octavio Muciño Jr., who was born on 1 February 1973.

== International career ==
At the age of 21, Muciño debuted for the Mexico national football team on 6 July 1971 in a friendly match against Greece.

Muciño scored his first and second international goals on 4 December 1971 against Honduras in the 1971 CONCACAF Championship. Mexico would win the competition largely in part of his goals.

Muciño was a key figure in the 1973 CONCACAF Championship, which doubled as CONCACAF's 1974 FIFA World Cup qualification, starting in all of Mexico's 5 games. Muciño scored 4 goals in a 8 - 0 win against the Netherlands Antilles, becoming Mexico's top goal scorer in the competition. Muciño played his final match international match on 18 December 1973 in a 1-0 win against Haiti in the competition.

== Death ==
=== Murder ===
At approximately 11 on night of 30 May 1974, Muciño met with 3 friends and their dates at Carlos O' Willys, a fine dining restaurant frequented by wealthy patrons located in Guadalajara. A few tables away from where Muciño's party was situated, sat 32-year-old Jaime Antonio Muldoon Barreto. Muldoon Barreto was described to be in an inebriated state. Purportedly a fan of Guadalajara's rival team Atlas, Muldoon Barreto recognized Muciño and walked towards his table and began to discuss football with him. Eventually, Muldoon Barreto began to antagonize and hurl insults towards Muciño and his date which escalated into a physical altercation between the two men. The two were broken up by fellow patrons and Muldoon Barreto was thrown out of restaurant. Approximately an hour and a half later, Muciño and his group left the restaurant. Muldoon Barreto was inside a luxury car near the entrance of the restaurant, apparently waiting for Muciño to exit. Muciño wishing to make peace with Muldoon Barreto, extended his hand for a handshake. Muldoon Barreto, however, immediately shot Muciño point-blank 3 times with a .25 ACP, once in the head, thorax, and shoulder. Muldoon Barreto then sped away from the area evading capture. Muciño was taken to Hospital México Americano where he was in a coma for 3 days. At approximately 5:30 on the morning of 3 June 1974, Muciño died from his injuries.

=== Aftermath ===
News of Muciño's death quickly spread and shocked the city of Guadalajara and Mexico City. Angered football fans vandalized and attempted to set fire to Carlos O' Willys. Thousands of fans attended Muciño's funeral held in Jasso, Hidalgo, where he was subsequently buried.

According to Muciño's son, a month or two after the murder occurred, Jaime Antonio Muldoon Barreto left Mexico for Spain, where there did not exist an extradition treaty between the two countries. When he returned to Mexico in 1980, Muldoon Barreto's lawyers cited poor mental faculties as reason he was unfit to stand trial. Muldoon Barreto was subsequently never prosecuted for Muciño's murder and remained free.

=== Perpetrator ===
Jaime Antonio Muldoon Barreto (born 1942) was a mechanical-electrical engineer who belonged to a wealthy architecture and real estate family based in Guadalajara. Muldoon Barreto graduated from Monterrey Institute of Technology and Higher Education in 1967. Muldoon Barreto's freedom is widely attributed to the influence and power possessed by the Muldoon Barreto family in the Mexican government.

== Legacy ==
Despite his short career, Muciño established himself as an important figure in both Cruz Azul and Mexican football. Muciño is often cited to be one of Cruz Azul's integral players who had helped achieve the club's rapid rise to prominence in the 1970s. Along with Enrique Borja, whose career statistics rivaled that of Muciño's, he is often deemed to be one of the greatest Mexican footballers of his generation.

On 3 June 2009, 35 years after his death, Octavio Muciño was inducted into Cruz Azul's hall of fame. A ceremony was held with Muciño's family in attendance as well as former teammate Alberto Quintano. In November 2011, Muciño was honored in a similar fashion by Guadalajara having Muciño's number 9 shirt inducted into the club's museum.

== Career statistics ==
=== Club ===
Appearances and goals by club, season and competition
Club	Season	Division	League		Cup		International		Total		Average goals per game
Club	Season	Division	Apps	Goals	Apps	Goals	Apps	Goals	Apps	Goals	Average goals per game
Cruz Azul	1969–70	Primera División	28	14	–	–	2	3	30	17	0.57
Cruz Azul	1970–71	Primera División	30	19	4	1	–	–	34	20	0.62
Cruz Azul	1971–72	Primera División	30	12	6	3	8	9	44	24	0.55
Cruz Azul	1972–73	Primera División	22	1	4	1	–	–	26	2	0.08
Cruz Azul	Total		110	46	14	5	10	12	134	63	0.47
Guadalajara	1973–74	Primera División	26	15	4	4	–	–	30	19	0.63
Career total			136	61	18	9	10	12	164	82	0.5

=== International ===
Appearances and goals by national team and year
National team	Year	Apps	Goals
Mexico	1971	6	2
Mexico	1972	5	1
Mexico	1973	5	4
Total		16	7

Scores and results list Muciño's goal tally first, score column indicates score after each Mexico goal.

List of international goals scored by Octavio Muciño
No.	Date	Venue	Opponent	Score	Result	Competition	Ref.
1	4 December 1971	Queen's Park Oval, Port of Spain, Trinidad and Tobago	Honduras	1–0	2–1	1971 CONCACAF Championship	
2	4 December 1971	Queen's Park Oval, Port of Spain, Trinidad and Tobago	Honduras	2–1	2–1	1971 CONCACAF Championship	
3	4 April 1972	Estadio Azteca, Mexico City, Mexico	Peru	1–1	2–1	Friendly	
4	8 December 1973	Stade Sylvio Cator, Port-au-Prince, Haiti	Netherlands Antilles	2–0	8–0	1973 CONCACAF Championship	
5	8 December 1973	Stade Sylvio Cator, Port-au-Prince, Haiti	Netherlands Antilles	4–0	8–0	1973 CONCACAF Championship	
6	8 December 1973	Stade Sylvio Cator, Port-au-Prince, Haiti	Netherlands Antilles	5–0	8–0	1973 CONCACAF Championship	
7	8 December 1973	Stade Sylvio Cator, Port-au-Prince, Haiti	Netherlands Antilles	8–0	8–0	1973 CONCACAF Championship	

== Honours ==
Cruz Azul

- Mexican Primera División: México 1970, 1971–1972, 1972–1973
- CONCACAF Champions' Cup: 1970, 1971

Mexico

- CONCACAF Championship: 1971

== See also ==
- Fernando Bustos
- Salvador Cabañas
- Andrés Escobar
- Tommy Ball
- Luciano Re Cecconi
