= Jorge Davino =

Argentinian footballer (born 1945)

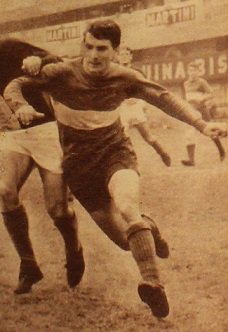
- Davino in 1966

Personal information
- Full name: Jorge Manuel Davino Bianchini
- Date of birth: 27 April 1945 (age 81)
- Place of birth: Buenos Aires, Argentina
- Position: Right winger

Youth career
- ???–1964: Boca Juniors

Senior career*
Years	Team	Apps	(Gls)
1965–1966	Boca Juniors	1	(0)
1966	Millonarios	19	(6)
1967–1968	Huracán	35	(11)
1969	Deportivo Cali	38	(10)
1970	Kimberley	26	(2)
1970–1974	León		
1974–1976	Atlético Potosino		
1976–1978	Puebla		
1977	→ Kimberley (loan)		
1978–1979	Quilmes		
1979	Kimberley		
- * Club domestic league appearances and goals

Jorge Manuel Davino Bianchini (born 27 April 1945) is an Argentinian former footballer and chef. Nicknamed "Cholín" in his home country and "Tarzán" in Mexico, he played as a offensive midfielder for a variety of clubs in Argentina, Colombia and Mexico throughout the 1970s. He is most known for playing for León throughout his career, achieving several titles throughout his career as well as being the father of Mexican internationals Flavio and Duilio Davino.

== Career ==
Davino began his career within the Boca Juniors Reserves and Academy throughout his youth career. He was then promoted to the senior squad following his prior success but made his only appearance in the 0–1 defeat against San Lorenzo during the 1965 Argentine Primera División on 11 July. Due to these disappointing results, during the middle of the 1966 season, he switched over to play for Millonarios in Colombia where he got far more consistent success with 19 appearances and 6 goals. He then returned to Argentina to play for Huracán with his debut being on 16 April 1967 against Vélez Sarsfield in a 2–1 victory with goals from his teammates Alfredo Obberti and Hugo Tedesco. Throughout his two seasons with the Globos, he made 35 appearances and scored 11 goals with his final match being a 0–1 defeat against Los Andes on 22 September 1968.

Following this relative success, he once again returned to Colombia to play for Deportivo Cali this time where he made 38 appearances and scoring 10 goals, ultimately helping the club win their 3rd title in the 1969 Campeonato Profesional. Following a brief stint with Kimberley throughout a majority of the 1970 season with twenty-six appearances and two goals, León club manager Antonio Carbajal was interested in signing Argentinian players and alongside his teammate Juan José Valiente and San Lorenzo defender Rafael Albrecht as they all began playing in the Mexican Primera División for the 1970 season with Ferro Carril Oeste forward Roberto Salomone later joining the three for the 1971–72 season. This decision would bring about a football dynasty for the Esmeraldas with their successes beginning in the 1970–71 Copa México as well that season's Campeón de Campeones. This same success would continue into the 1971–72 season with that season's Copa México and Campeón de Campeones with his career with León being well-regarded by both his teammates and fans.

Following his success with León, he began playing for Atlético Potosino and Puebla throughout his career in Mexico. When he played for Kimberly in a loan in 1977, met a young Diego Maradona where he saw potential in the future international legend as he went on to win the 1986 FIFA World Cup.

== Later career ==
Following his retirement from professional football, Davino took up in several ventures in the restaurant business. Following several attempts, he eventually found success through opening up a restaurant in León that specializes in Argentine cuisine. He also currently operates a highly regarded football training facility in León.

== Personal life ==
Davino has cited Alfredo Di Stéfano as his main inspiration for the sport growing up as well as for being one of the earliest examples of Argentinian success abroad. He also cited successes of Chilean forward Carlos Reinoso throughout his career in the Liga MX.

Davino met his future wife in León as he was later the father of Flavio and Duilio Davino, both of whom chose to represent Mexico internationally.
