= Duilio Davino =

Mexican footballer (born 1976)

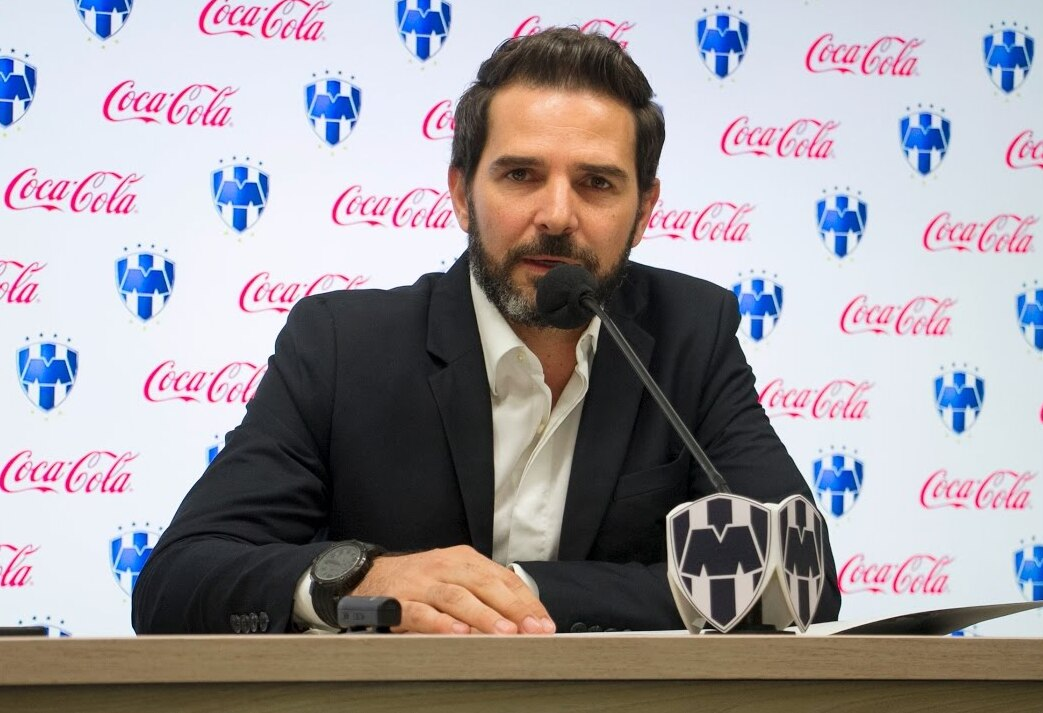
- Davino in 2016

Personal information
- Full name: Duilio César Jean Pierre; Davino Rodríguez
- Date of birth: 21 March 1976 (age 50)
- Place of birth: León, Guanajuato, Mexico
- Height: 1.80 m (5 ft 11 in)
- Position: Defender

Senior career*
Years	Team	Apps	(Gls)
1993–1997	Tecos UAG	69	(3)
1997–2007	América	323	(11)
2008	FC Dallas	23	(0)
2009	Puebla	19	(1)
2009–2011	Monterrey	66	(0)
2011–2012	Tecos UAG	24	(1)
Total		524	(16)

International career
1996–2006	Mexico	84	(2)
Medal record
Representing Mexico
Winner	CONCACAF Gold Cup	1998
Third place	Copa America	1997
- * Club domestic league appearances and goals

Duilio César Jean Pierre Davino Rodríguez (born 21 March 1976) is a Mexican former professional footballer and football executive. As a player, he played as a defender for several clubs, including Club América and Monterrey, and represented the Mexico national team at the 1998 FIFA World Cup.

After retiring, he worked in Monterrey's club management. In 2023, he was appointed sporting director of Mexico's men's national teams by the Mexican Football Federation.

== Club career ==
Davino made his professional debut with Tecos UAG in 1994. He played for Tecos from the 1993–94 season through the 1996–97 season before joining Club América in 1997.

Davino spent approximately ten years at América, remaining with the club until 2007. He made 323 appearances and scored 11 goals across the league's regular season and playoffs, and also served as the team's captain. During his time at the club, América won the Mexican league titles in the 2002 Verano and 2005 Clausura tournaments.

In January 2008, Davino signed with FC Dallas of Major League Soccer. He made 23 regular-season appearances during the 2008 season. After the season ended, he concluded his contract with the club and returned to Mexico.

In January 2009, he joined Puebla, playing in the Clausura tournament. In June 2009, he moved on loan to Monterrey, where he began playing in the Apertura tournament.

At Monterrey, Davino played as a centre-back and won league titles in the 2009 Apertura and 2010 Apertura tournaments. He also contributed to the club's victory in the 2010–11 CONCACAF Champions League. In June 2011, he returned to Tecos on loan. During the 2011–12 season, he made 24 league appearances and scored one goal.

== International career ==
Davino made his debut for the Mexico national team in 1996 and was part of the Mexican squad that won the 1996 CONCACAF Gold Cup. In the same year, he also represented Mexico in the football tournament at the 1996 Summer Olympics.

In 1997, he participated in the 1997 Copa América and the 1997 FIFA Confederations Cup. At the 1998 FIFA World Cup, held in France, Davino started all four of Mexico's matches, including all three group-stage games and the round of 16. Mexico advanced from the group stage after defeating the South Korea 3–1 and drawing against the Belgium and Netherlands national teams. However, Mexico were eliminated after losing 2–1 to the Germany.

Davino also played as a regular defender in the 1998 CONCACAF Gold Cup, where Mexico defeated the United States 1–0 in the final to win the tournament. He continued to represent Mexico until 2006, participating in several international tournaments, including the 2001 FIFA Confederations Cup and the 2004 Copa América.

== Personal life ==
He is the son of former Argentine footballer Jorge Davino and the brother of Flavio Davino, a defender who played for Tecos UAG and retired from professional football in 2006. Duilio had another brother, Jorge Davino, who died in a traffic accident and was reportedly considered to have had greater potential than his two brothers. Davino also has Italian ancestry and was believed to have been eligible to represent the Italy national team.

== Honours ==
UAG

- Mexican Primera División: 1993–94
- CONCACAF Cup Winners Cup: 1995

América

- Mexican Primera División: Verano 2002, Clausura 2005
- Campeón de Campeones: 2005
- CONCACAF Champions' Cup: 2006
- CONCACAF Giants Cup: 2001

Monterrey

- Mexican Primera División: Apertura 2009, Apertura 2010
- CONCACAF Champions League: 2010–11

Mexico

- CONCACAF Gold Cup: 1996, 1998
- CONCACAF Pre-Olympic Tournament: 1996

Individual

- Mexican Primera División Rookie of the Tournament: 1995–96
- Mexican Primera División Center Back of the Tournament: Apertura 2009

== Career statistics ==
Goal	Date	Venue	Opponent	Score	Result	Competition
1.	8 October 2000	Estadio Azteca, Mexico City, Mexico	Trinidad and Tobago	5–0	7–0	2002 FIFA World Cup qualification
2.	19 June 2004	Alamodome, San Antonio, United States	Dominica	8–0	10–0	2006 FIFA World Cup qualification
