= Flavio Davino =

Mexican footballer (born 1974)

Personal information
- Full name: Flavio Germán Davino Rodríguez
- Date of birth: 15 August 1974 (age 52)
- Place of birth: León, Mexico
- Height: 1.80 m (5 ft 11 in)
- Position: Midfielder

Senior career*
Years	Team	Apps	(Gls)
1995–1997	Tecos UAG	45	(1)
1997–1998	León	34	(4)
1998–2002	Morelia	136	(10)
2002–2003	Cruz Azul	15	(1)
2003–2006	Tecos UAG	88	(4)
Total		318	(20)

International career
2001	Mexico	1	(0)

Managerial career
- 2006: Boca Juniors (Assistant)
- 2007: Vélez Sarsfield (Assistant)
- 2008–2009: Monterrey (Assistant)
- 2009: Atlas (Assistant)
- 2011: Banfield (Assistant)
- 2012–2013: Atlante (Assistant)
- 2014: Atlético San Luis
- 2016: Oaxaca
- * Club domestic league appearances and goals

Flavio Germán Davino Rodríguez (Note: In this Spanish name, the first or paternal surname is Davino and the second or maternal family name is Rodríguez.) (born 15 August 1974) is a Mexican former professional footballer.

== Club career ==
Flavio began his career in top-flight football with his current club Tecos. In winter 1997, he was transferred to León and later to Monarcas Morelia. For eight seasons, he played with Morelia and in apertura 2002. Then he got transferred to Cruz Azul. He retired in 2006 as a player but continues being in the soccer arena, but now to study to become coach.

== International career ==
He appeared with the Mexico national football team in 2001 under the wing of Enrique Meza in an exhibition match against Bulgaria of which was held in Morelia, Michoacán.

== Personal life ==
He is the son of the former Argentine footballer Jorge Davino, and the brother of Duilio Davino. Davino is also of Italian descent.

== Honours ==
Morelia

- Mexican Primera División: Invierno 2000
