= Aníbal Cibeyra =

Argentinian footballer (born 1949)

Personal information
- Full name: Aníbal Francisco Cibeyra
- Date of birth: 29 July 1949 (age 77)
- Place of birth: Santos Lugares, Buenos Aires, Argentina
- Position: Right winger

Youth career
- 1956–1966: River Plate

Senior career*
| Years | Team | Apps | (Gls) |
| 1967–1969 | River Plate | | |
| 1969–1977 | Guadalajara | | |
| 1973–1974 | → Unión Tumán (loan) | | |
| 1976–1976 | → Atlanta (loan) | | |
| 1976 | → Atlético Junior (loan) | | |
| 1977 | Boca Juniors | 16 | (2) |
| 1978 | Emelec | | |
| 1979–1980 | Everest | | |

International career
| 1967 | Argentina U20 | | |
- * Club domestic league appearances and goals

Francisco Aníbal Cibeyra (born 29 July 1949) is a retired Argentine footballer. Nicknamed "Loco", he was known for playing for both River Plate and Boca Juniors throughout the 1970s as well as for a variety of clubs across Peru, Colombia and Ecuador.

== Club career ==
Cibeyra was born on 29 July 1949 at Santos Lugares, he began playing as a right winger within the youth sector of Club Atlético River Plate in 1956. Following his promotion to the senior squad in 1967, he played for two more years until he was loaned out to Guadalajara in the beginning of the 1969–70 season. Throughout his career with Chivas, he would be loaned out to several clubs including Unión Tumán in Peru, Atlanta and Atlético Junior in Colombia. In the 1977 season, Cibeyra arrived at Boca Juniors but only made 16 appearances and scored two goals against Platense and Huracán.

Following this, he spent the rest of his career in Ecuador as he first began playing for Emelec in 1978. Despite being around the end of his career, Cibeyra's tenures with Emelec in 1978 and Everest in 1979 and 1980 with the latter being his final season before retirement. During the 1978 editions of the Clásico del Astillero, he scored three consecutive Olympic goals with his first being in a 2–1 victory alongside a goal from his teammate Lupo Quiñónez on 9 June, surprising Barcelona goalkeeper Gerardo Rodríguez. His second Olympic goal came during a 2–1 defeat following goals from Ángel Liciardi and Jorge Chica where he managed to save the club from a complete defeat as after Barcelona goalkeeper Enrique Aguirre managing to save a goal, Cibeyra soon supported the effort by ultimately scoring the only goal of the Bombillo on 17 September. His third came on 19 November that year in a 1–0 victory just as the season was concluding. This set a new record of the amount of Olympic goals scored by a single player in the Liga Pro with Cibeyra serving as a contributor to the worldwide recognition of the strategy.

== International career ==
Cibeyra represented the Argentina U20 for the 1967 South American U-20 Championship where the club claimed their first title.
