= Rafael Albrecht =

Argentine footballer (1941–2021)

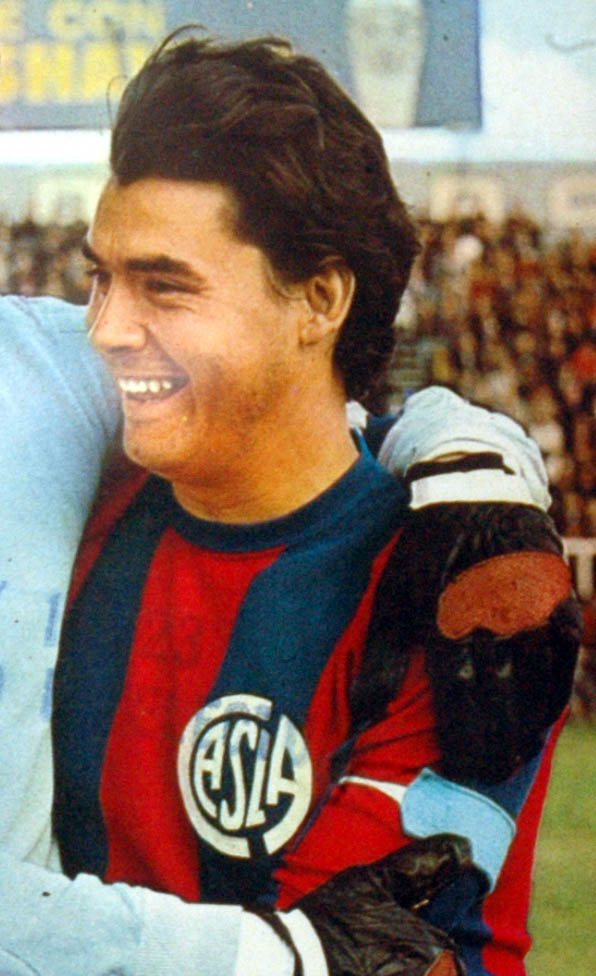
- Albrecht in 1968

Personal information
- Full name: José Rafael Albrecht
- Date of birth: 23 August 1941
- Place of birth: Tucumán, Argentina
- Date of death: 3 May 2021 (aged 79)
- Place of death: Buenos Aires, Argentina
- Height: 1.77 m (5 ft 10 in)
- Position: Defender

Youth career
- Atlético Tucumán

Senior career*
Years	Team	Apps	(Gls)
1957–1960	Atlético Tucumán		
1960–1962	Estudiantes	70	(0)
1963–1970	San Lorenzo	229	(56)
1970–1974	Club León	145	(36)
1974–1975	Atlas	62	(3)

International career
1961–1969	Argentina	39	(3)
- * Club domestic league appearances and goals

José Rafael Albrecht (23 August 1941 – 3 May 2021) was an Argentine professional footballer who played as a defender. He represented Argentina at the 1962 and 1966 World Cups.

== Career ==
Albrecht was born in Tucumán. He started his career with Club Atlético Tucumán in 1957. In 1960, he was signed by Estudiantes, where he excelled and, thus, was called to play for the Argentina national team in 1961.

In 1962 he was transferred to San Lorenzo for 10 million pesos, a huge amount for those days. In San Lorenzo, he was part of two famous teams, the 'Carsucias' in 1964 and the 'Matadores' in 1968. The 'Matadores' team won the 1968 Metropolitano Championship without losing a single game. He played 229 games for the club, scoring 56 goals. Most of them were by way of penalties.

In the 1966 FIFA World Cup, during the scoreless draw with West Germany in a group stage match, Albrecht was sent off and suspended for the next match. FIFA cautioned Argentina for its violent style in the group games.

In 1970 Albrecht moved to Mexico. He first played with Club León, helping the team win two Copa México and two Campeón de Campeones super cups. He then played for Atlas, where he retired from football in 1975.

Albrecht played a total of 506 top flight games in his career, scoring a total of 95 goals, putting him in 7th place on the IFFHS list of top scoring defenders.

== Death ==
Albrecht died on 3 May 2021, aged 79, after two weeks of hospitalisation with COVID-19, amid the COVID-19 pandemic in Argentina.

== Honours ==
Atlético Tucumán

- Campeonato de Campeones de la República Argentina: 1960
- Annual Liga Tucumana: 1957, 1958, 1959, 1960

San Lorenzo

- Argentine Primera División: 1968 Metropolitano

Club León

- Copa México: 1970–71, 1971–72
- Campeón de Campeones: 1970–71, 1971–72
- Liga MX runner-up: 1972–73

Argentina

- Copa América runner-up: 1967

Individual

- IFFHS Argentina All Times Dream Team (Team C): 2021
