= José de Jesús Valdez =

Mexican footballer (born 1947)

Personal information
- Full name: José de Jesús Valdez Rodríguez
- Date of birth: 1 June 1947 (age 79)
- Place of birth: León, Guanajuato, Mexico
- Position: Forward

Senior career*
Years	Team	Apps	(Gls)
1965–1974	León		
1974–1978	América		
1978–1979	Unión de Curtidores		

International career
1971–1974	Mexico	13	(0)
Medal record
Men's football
Representing Mexico
CONCACAF Championship
Gold medal – first place	1971 Trinidad and Tobago	Team
- * Club domestic league appearances and goals

José de Jesús Valdez Rodríguez (born 1 June 1947) is a retired Mexican footballer. Nicknamed "Cocodrilo", he played as forward for León and América throughout the 1970s, winning many titles with both clubs across the decade. He also represented Mexico internationally for the 1971 and 1973 CONCACAF Championships, being part of the winning squad for the former.

== Club career ==
Valdez began his career with his hometown club of León in 1965, achieving his first title in the 1967–68 Copa México with this achievement being repeated in the 1970–71 Copa México and the 1971–72 Copa México. He then began playing for América beginning in the 1974–75 season. His greatest success with the club came during the following 1975–76 Mexican Primera División as he was part of the winning squad that won the tournament with that same season also seeing the Águilas winning the 1975–76 Copa México and the 1977 CONCACAF Champions' Cup. He would play until the 1977–78 season as he spent his final season playing for Unión de Curtidores.

== International career ==
Bermúdez was first called up to play for Mexico for the 1971 CONCACAF Championship where he was part of the winning squad of the tournament. He then played in friendlies across in 1972 and played in the following 1973 CONCACAF Championship where the Tricolor would fail to qualify for the 1974 FIFA World Cup.

== Later life ==
Following his retirement, Valdez still remained active within the Águilas, becoming a talent scout for the club's youth academy.
