= Alberto Gómez (Argentine footballer) =

Argentine footballer

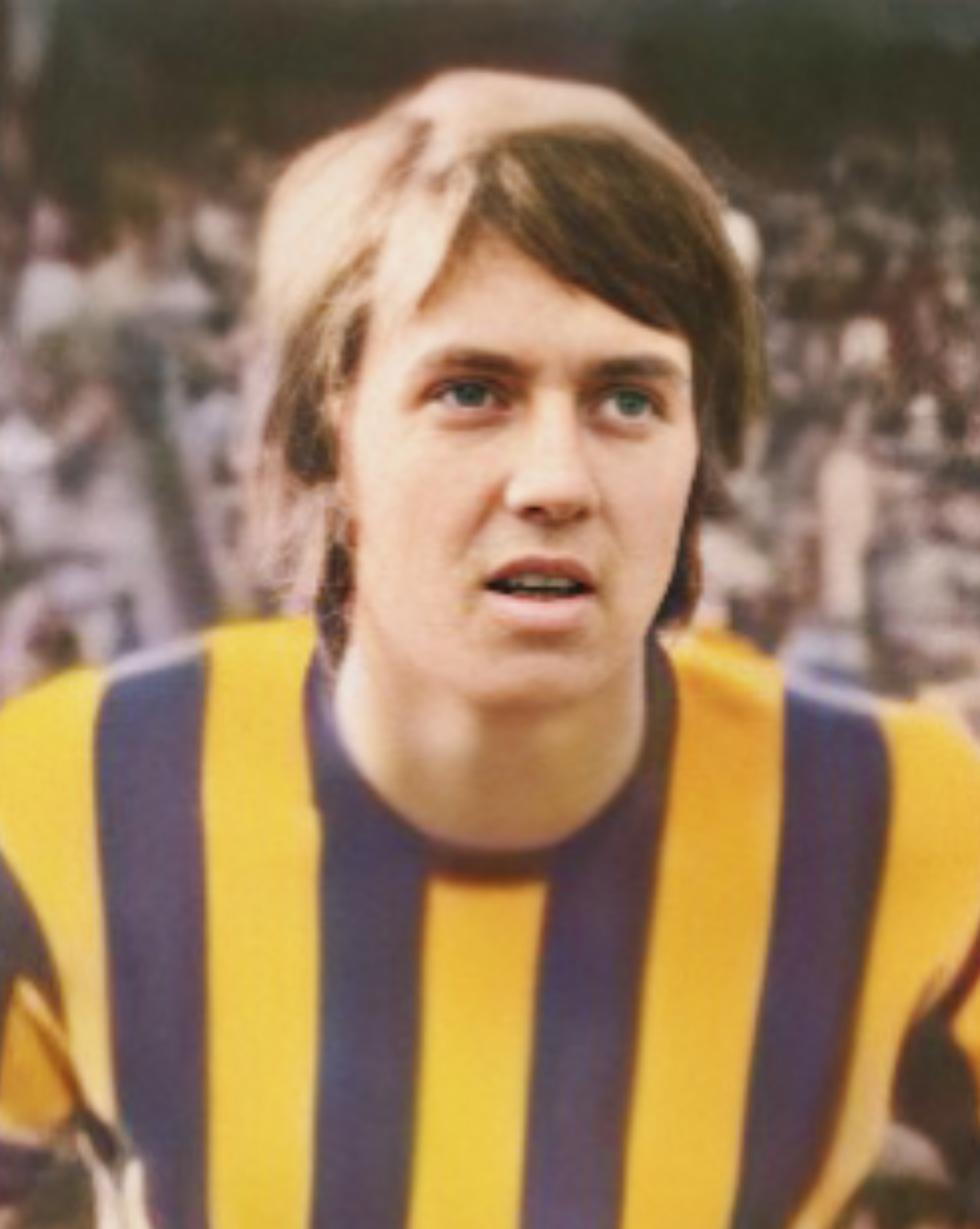
- Gomez in 1970

Personal information
- Full name: Alberto Jesus Gómez Franzutti
- Date of birth: 18 March 1950 (age 76)
- Place of birth: Rosario, Argentina
- Position: Midfielder

Senior career*
| Years | Team | Apps | (Gls) |
| 1968–1971 | Rosario Central | | |
| 1971–1978 | Cruz Azul | | |
| 1976–1977 | Atlético Potosino | 38 | (4) |
| 1978–1980 | Deportivo Neza | 51 | (8) |
| – | Renato Cesarini | | |
| 1980 | Platense | | |

International career
- Argentina
- * Club domestic league appearances and goals

Alberto Jesús "Hijitus" Gómez Franzutti (born 18 March 1950) is a retired Argentine football player.

== Career ==
Gómez began his playing career with Argentine first division club Rosario Central. He made his league debut against Argentinos Juniors in 1968.

In 1972, Gómez joined Liga MX México Primera División side Cruz Azul and made his league debut against Club de Fútbol Laguna on 11 March 1972. He would spend the next seven seasons with Cruz Azul, winning the league three times. hg
