= Carlos Gómez (footballer, born 1952) =

Mexican footballer (1952–2017)

Personal information
- Full name: Carlos Gómez Casillas
- Date of birth: 16 August 1952
- Place of birth: Mexico
- Date of death: 16 December 2017 (aged 65)
- Position: Defender

Senior career*
Years	Team	Apps	(Gls)
1970–1978	Club León		
1978–1979	Monterrey	30	
1979–1980	Tampico FC	23	
1980–1982	Puebla	31	
1980–1984	Atlético Potosino	21	

International career
1977–1979	Mexico	8	(0)
- * Club domestic league appearances and goals

Carlos Gómez Casillas (16 August 1952 – 16 December 2017) was a Mexican football defender who played for Mexico in the 1978 FIFA World Cup. He also played for Club León.
