= Fernando Bustos =

Mexican footballer (1944–1979)

Personal information
- Full name: Fernando Bustos Castañeda
- Date of birth: 1 August 1944
- Place of birth: Mexico City, Mexico
- Date of death: 23 September 1979 (aged 35)
- Place of death: Tepeji del Río, Mexico
- Position: Midfielder

Youth career
- 1959-1963: Union Obrera

Senior career*
Years	Team	Apps	(Gls)
1963–1979	Cruz Azul		(84)
1976–1977	→ Atlético Español (loan)	19	(2)

International career
1967–1973	Mexico	39	(11)
1968	Mexico Olympic	4	(0)
- * Club domestic league appearances and goals

Fernando Bustos Castañeda (1 August 1944 – 23 September 1979) was a Mexican footballer who competed in the 1968 Summer Olympics.

== Death ==
Bustos died in a car accident on the road to Querétaro in 1979, aged just 35.

== Legacy ==
Bustos was inducted into Salón de la Fama del futbol in Pachuca on November 13, 2018.

== Honours ==
Cruz Azul

- Mexican Primera División: 1968–69, México 1970, 1971–72, 1972–73, 1973–74, 1978–79
- Mexican Segunda División: 1963–64
- Copa México: 1968–69
- Campeón de Campeones: 1969, 1974
- CONCACAF Champions' Cup: 1969, 1970, 1971
