= Alberto Quintano =

Chilean footballer (born 1946)

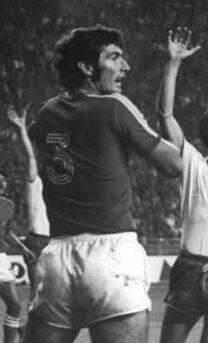
- Quintano during the 1974 World Cup

Personal information
- Full name: Alberto Fernando Quintano Ralph
- Date of birth: 26 April 1946 (age 80)
- Place of birth: Santiago, Chile
- Height: 1.86 m (6 ft 1 in)
- Position: Defender

Youth career
- Universidad de Chile

Senior career*
Years	Team	Apps	(Gls)
1965–1971	Universidad de Chile	179	(1)
1971–1977	Cruz Azul		
1977–1980	Universidad de Chile	146	(5)
1981	Universidad Católica		
1982	Magallanes		

International career
1967–1979	Chile	50	(0)

Managerial career
- 1983–1985: Cruz Azul
- 1986: Everton
- 1987–1988: Universidad de Chile
- 1988–1989: Deportes La Serena
- 1991: Universidad de Chile
- * Club domestic league appearances and goals

Alberto Fernando Quintano Ralph (born 26 April 1946), commonly known as El Mariscal, is a Chilean former professional footballer. He played as a defender for Universidad de Chile in Chile's Primera División.

== Career ==
=== Player ===
He emerged from the University of Chile in the 1960s. These years were historic for the "U" and were the period known as Ballet Azul. For a decade and a half he was a key figure in La Red.

At the end of that decade he migrated to Mexican football, where he became the star in the central defense of Cruz Azul, pairing with Javier "Kaliman" Guzman. He stayed there for six years.

He found a partner in Elias Figueroa, with whom he formed a defensive partnership, described as a true "wall" in the World Alemania '74.

He participated in the 1969 playoffs for the World Cup in Mexico '70 and in the 1977 playoffs for the World Cup in Argentina 1978. On both occasions Chile was not ranked.

Quintano ended his career as an active player playing for Club Deportivo Magallanes.

=== Manager ===
Quintano took over the youth categories in the table on U. Club Cruz Azul offered him the post as technical director until 1986, delivering good accounts but without the desired title.

He returned to Chile where he directed Everton, Deportes La Serena and University of Chile, where he first took over the youth divisions and then the first team. Between 1992 and 1993 he became Chief of Technical Divisions under the University of Chile, and then Director-General of all classes indoors.

From 1996 to 1998, he participated as Technical Manager at the National Association of Professional Football. (ANFP). In this capacity, he worked with Nelson Acosta, participating in the South American playoffs for the France 98 World Cup.

In 2000 became Professor of Football Instruction of the National Institute of Football, and in 2001 he became Director of the Career Coach of Football.

In June 2009 Quintano replaced Eduardo de la Torre and became the new Sporting Director For Mexican Club Cruz Azul.
