= Ignacio Flores (Mexican footballer) =

Mexican footballer (1953-2011)

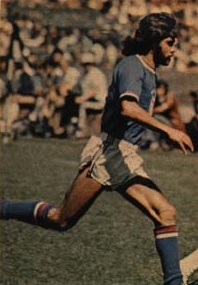
- Flores playing for Cruz Azul

Personal information
- Full name: Ignacio Flores Ocaranza
- Date of birth: 31 July 1953
- Place of birth: Mexico City, Mexico
- Date of death: 11 August 2011 (aged 58)
- Place of death: Cuernavaca, Morelos, Mexico
- Position: Right-back

Senior career*
| Years | Team | Apps | (Gls) |
| 1972–1990 | Cruz Azul | 522 | (13) |

International career
| 1975–1981 | Mexico | 14 | (0) |
- * Club domestic league appearances and goals

Ignacio Flores Ocaranza (31 July 1953 – 11 August 2011) was a Mexican professional footballer who played as a right-back.

== Club career ==
Born in Mexico City, Flores spent his entire professional career with Cruz Azul.

He also represented Mexico at international level, and participated at the 1978 FIFA World Cup.

== Personal life ==
Flores was killed when a van carrying his family was attacked by gunmen in August 2011.

His brother, Luis Flores, also was a Mexico international footballer.
