= Adrián Camacho =

Mexican footballer (born 1955)

Personal information
- Full name: Adrián Camacho Solís
- Date of birth: 5 March 1957 (age 69)
- Place of birth: Mexico City, Mexico
- Position: Forward

Senior career*
Years	Team	Apps	(Gls)
1977–1986	Cruz Azul		(55)
1986–1989	América	78	(10)
1989–1991	Irapuato	57	(5)
1991–1992	Santos Laguna	4	(0)

International career
1980–1981	Mexico	5	(2)
Medal record
Men's football
Representing Mexico
CONCACAF Championship
Bronze medal – third place	1981 Honduras	Team
- * Club domestic league appearances and goals

Adrián Camacho Solís (born 5 March 1957) is a Mexican retired footballer. He played as a forward for Cruz Azul, América and Irapuato throughout the late 1970s and 1980s. He also represented Mexico internationally for the 1981 CONCACAF Championship.

== Club career ==
Camacho began his career within Cruz Azul for their 1977–78 season. Despite a good performance in his debut season with the club reaching the semi-finals, the following 1978–79 season saw the club win their 6th title of the tournament. His career throughout the late 1970s was often sparse due to the attacking formation being well established by players such as Rodolfo Montoya, Horacio López Salgado and José Luis Ceballos. However, the dawn of the 1980s through the 1979–80 season saw Camacho earn significantly more opportunities to score goals to where he played in the 1979–80 Mexican Primera División final and scored the first goal of the second legged match in just four minutes with the Maquina later achieving their 7th title after defeating Tigres UANL on aggregate. He remained with the club throughout the majority of the decade until his departure following the 1986 season as he switched to city rivals América.

His 1986–87 season debut for the Águilas saw them reach the semi-finals but ultimately eliminted relatively early. However, the following 1987–88 season saw the club earn their second title with Camacho scoring the third goal in an eventual 4–1 victory following the contributions of his teammates Gonzalo Farfán and Antônio Carlos. This success was repeated in the following 1988–89 season as after making his way to the final, Camacho now faced his former club of Cruz Azul for another edition of the Clásico Joven. During the first leg of the match, Camacho scored the second goal for América with the match ultimately ending in a 2–3 victory with his teammates Luis Roberto Alves and Carlos Hermosillo also scoring. Following the 1–0 victory, alongside with the Águilas earning their 8th title, Camacho became the only footballer to win two titles with both Cruz Azul and América respectively.

Throughout the early 1990s, Camacho played for Irapuato until their relegation in 1991 and Santos Laguna for a single season before retiring following their 1991–92 season.

== International career ==
Camacho was first called up to represent Mexico for the 1981 CONCACAF Championship qualification away match against Canada on 18 October 1980, coming in as a substitute for Alejandro Ramírez Monroy at the 74th minute. The following match against national rivals United States resulted in a 5–1 beating with Camacho scoring the 2nd and 5th goals of the match. Despite both playing an extensive role in the qualifiers and listed for the 1981 CONCACAF Championship proper, he only made a single appearance throughout the tournament in the 1–1 draw against Canada on 15 November 1981 with Mexico going on to fail to qualify for the 1982 FIFA World Cup.

== Later life ==
Camacho remained a fan of Cruz Azul throughout his later years, often giving his pieces on the state of the club at the moment.
