= Ricardo Chavarín =

Mexican footballer (born 1951)

Personal information
- Full name: Ricardo Heliodoro Chavarín Dueñas
- Date of birth: 3 July 1951 (age 75)
- Place of birth: Atenguillo, Jalisco, Mexico
- Position: Striker

Senior career*
Years	Team	Apps	(Gls)
1969–1971	Nacional		
1971–1976	Atlas		
1976–1982	Universidad Guadalajara	81	(16)
1979	→ Deportivo Neza (loan)	6	(1)

International career
1971–1979	Mexico	11	(1)
- * Club domestic league appearances and goals

Ricardo Heliodoro Chavarín Dueñas (born July 3, 1951) is a former Mexican football striker.

== Club career ==
Born in Atenguillo, Jalisco, Chavarín began playing football with local side Club Deportivo Nacional in the Segunda Division. In 1971, he joined Club Atlas where he was nicknamed Astro Boy after a Japanese cartoon popular at the time. Chavarín scored a goal for Atlas on his debut, but the club couldn't avoid relegation in his first season.

== International career ==
Chavarín made eleven appearances for Mexico, including the 1971 CONCACAF Championship finals.
