= Javier Guzmán =

Mexican footballer (1945-2014)

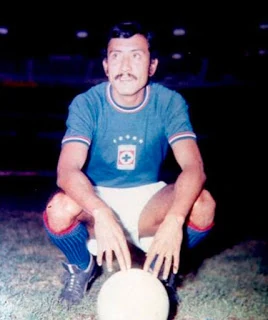

Personal information
- Full name: Javier Guzmán Colin
- Date of birth: 9 January 1945
- Place of birth: El Higo, Veracruz, Mexico
- Date of death: 14 August 2014 (aged 69)
- Height: 1.82 m (5 ft 11 1/2 in)
- Position: Defender

Senior career*
Years	Team	Apps	(Gls)
1962–1964	Tampico		
1964–1978	Cruz Azul		
1968–1969	→ UNAM (loan)		
1978–1979	Veracruz		

International career
1970–1977	Mexico	38	(2)
- * Club domestic league appearances and goals

Javier Guzmán Colin (January 9, 1945 – August 14, 2014) was a Mexican football defender, who played for the Mexico national team between 1970 and 1977. He was part of the Mexico squad for the 1970 World Cup on home soil.

At club level, Guzmán played for Tampico, Cruz Azul, Pumas UNAM, and Veracruz.
