= Juan Manuel Alejándrez =

Mexican footballer (1944–2007)

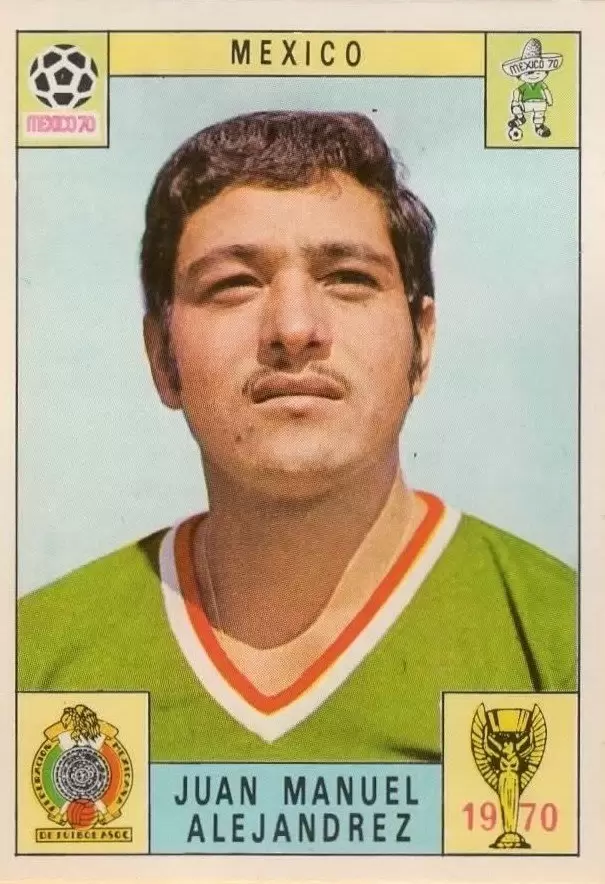
- Alejándrez in 1970

Personal information
- Full name: Juan Manuel Alejándrez Rodríguez
- Date of birth: May 17, 1944
- Place of birth: San Pedro Tesistan, Jalisco, Mexico
- Date of death: January 6, 2007 (aged 62)
- Height: 1.70 m (5 ft 7 in)
- Position: Defender

Senior career*
Years	Team	Apps	(Gls)
1964–1965	Club Deportivo Nacional		
1965–1973	Cruz Azul		
1973–1977	CD Oro		
1977–1978	Atlante		

International career
1967–1970	Mexico	24	(0)
- * Club domestic league appearances and goals

Juan Manuel Alejándrez Rodríguez (May 17, 1944 – January 6, 2007) was a Mexican football defender. He played for the Mexico national team between 1967 and 1970, including the World Cup on home soil in 1970.
