= 1976 Campeón de Campeones =

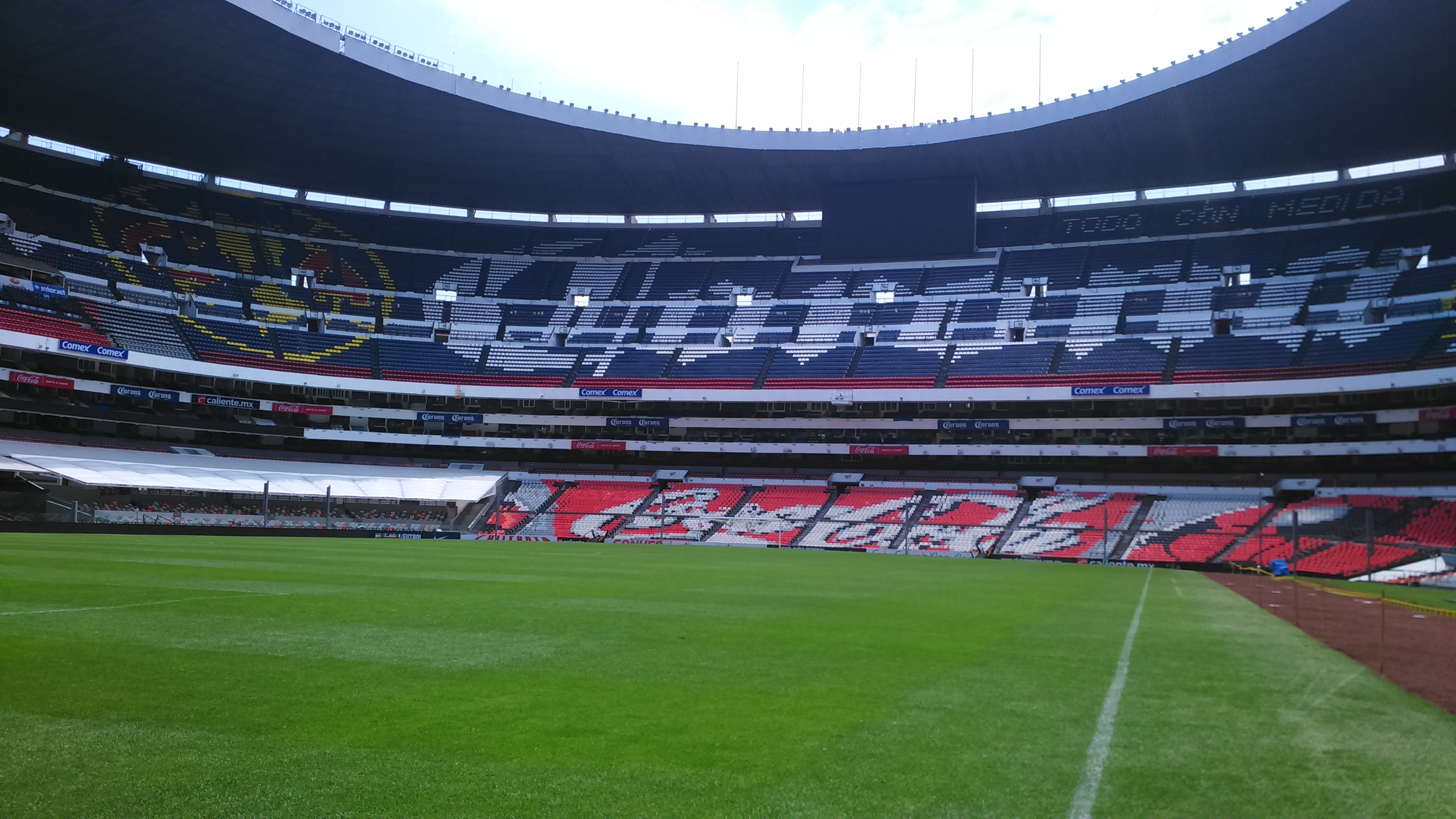
- Estadio Azteca hosted the match.
| América | Tigres |
| 2 | 0 |
- Date: 15 August 1976
- Venue: Estadio Azteca, México City
- Referee: Enrique Mendoza Guillén
- Attendance: 80,000

The 1976 Campeón de Campeones was the 34th edition of the Campeón de Campeones, an annual football super cup match. (Note: The edition number was calculated based on figures provided by Goal.com, with the first Campeón de Campeones having been held in 1941–42.) The match-up featured Cruz Azul, the winners of the 1975–76 Mexican Primera División, and América, the winners of the 1975–76 Copa México. It was played at the Estadio Azteca, Mexico City, on 15 August 1976.

América won the match 2–0 to secure their second Campeón de Campeones title.

== Match details ==
15 August 1976

| América | 2–0 | Tigres |
|---|---|---|
| Miguel Ángel Cornero 37'; Carlos Reinoso 44' |

Estadio Azteca, México DF
Attendance: 80,000
Referee: Enrique Mendoza Guillén

Club América:
| (Mexico) Francisco Castrejón |
| (Mexico) René Trujillo |
| (Mexico) Javier Sánchez Galindo |
| (Argentina) Miguel Ángel Cornero |
| (Mexico) Mario Pérez |
| (Mexico) Javier García López |
| (Mexico) Antonio de la Torre |
| (Mexico) Cesáreo Victorino | Substituted off |
| (Chile) Carlos Reinoso |
| (Brazil) Alcindo | Substituted off |
| (Paraguay) Hugo Enrique Kiesse |
Substitutes:
| (Mexico) Cristóbal Ortega | Substituted on |
| (Mexico) Enrique Borja | Substituted on |
Manager:
(Mexico) Raúl Cárdenas

Tigres:
| (Mexico) Mateo Bravo |
| (Mexico) René Pérez (footballer) |
| (Uruguay) Roberto Gadea |
| (Mexico) Orlando Bandala |
| (Mexico) Martín Navarro |
| (Mexico) Héctor González |
| (Mexico) Alberto Rodríguez | Substituted off |
| (Uruguay) Enrique Washington Olivera |
| (Peru) Gerónimo Barbadillo |
| (Mexico) Adrián Freyre |
| (Mexico) Tomás Boy | Substituted off |
Substitutes:
| (Mexico) Marcos Menéndez | Substituted on |
| (Mexico) Octavio Rodríguez | Substituted on |
Manager:
(Peru) Claudio Lostanau
