= 1978 Copa Interamericana =

1978 Copa Interamaricana
Boca Juniors	América
(Argentina)	(Mexico)
- Tied 2–2 on points, no goal difference into account, América won the playoff 2–1

First leg
Boca Juniors	América
3	0
- Date: March 28, 1978
- Venue: La Bombonera, La Boca
- Referee: Ramón Barreto (Uruguay)

Second leg
América	Boca Juniors
1	0
- Date: April 12, 1978
- Venue: Estadio Azteca, Mexico City
- Referee: Luis Siles (Costa Rica)

Playoff
América	Boca Juniors
2	1
- Date: April 14, 1978
- Venue: Estadio Azteca, Mexico City
- Referee: Gino D'Hipolito (USA)

The 1978 Copa Interamericana was a multi-leg football match contested between 1977 Copa Libertadores champion Boca Juniors and 1977 CONCACAF Champions' Cup champion Club América. It was the 6th edition of the competition.

Organized by the Confederation of North, Central American and Caribbean Association Football (CONCACAF) and Confederación Sudamericana de Fútbol (CONMEBOL), the 1978 edition was played between March and April 1978. In the first leg, held in La Bombonera in Buenos Aires, Boca Juniors won 3–0. In the second leg, held in Estadio Azteca in Mexico City, América beat Boca Juniors 1–0. Despite Boca Juniors had a goal difference of 3–1, it was not taken into account and a playoff match had to be played. Agreed by both clubs, it was held in Estadio Azteca again, where América beat Boca Juniors 2–1 to win the series 4–2 on points, achieving their first Copa Interamericana title.

== Qualified teams ==
Team	Qualification	Previous final app.
(Argentina) Boca Juniors	1977 Copa Libertadores champion	(none)
(Mexico) América	1977 CONCACAF Champions' Cup champion	(none)

Bold indicates winning years

== Venues ==
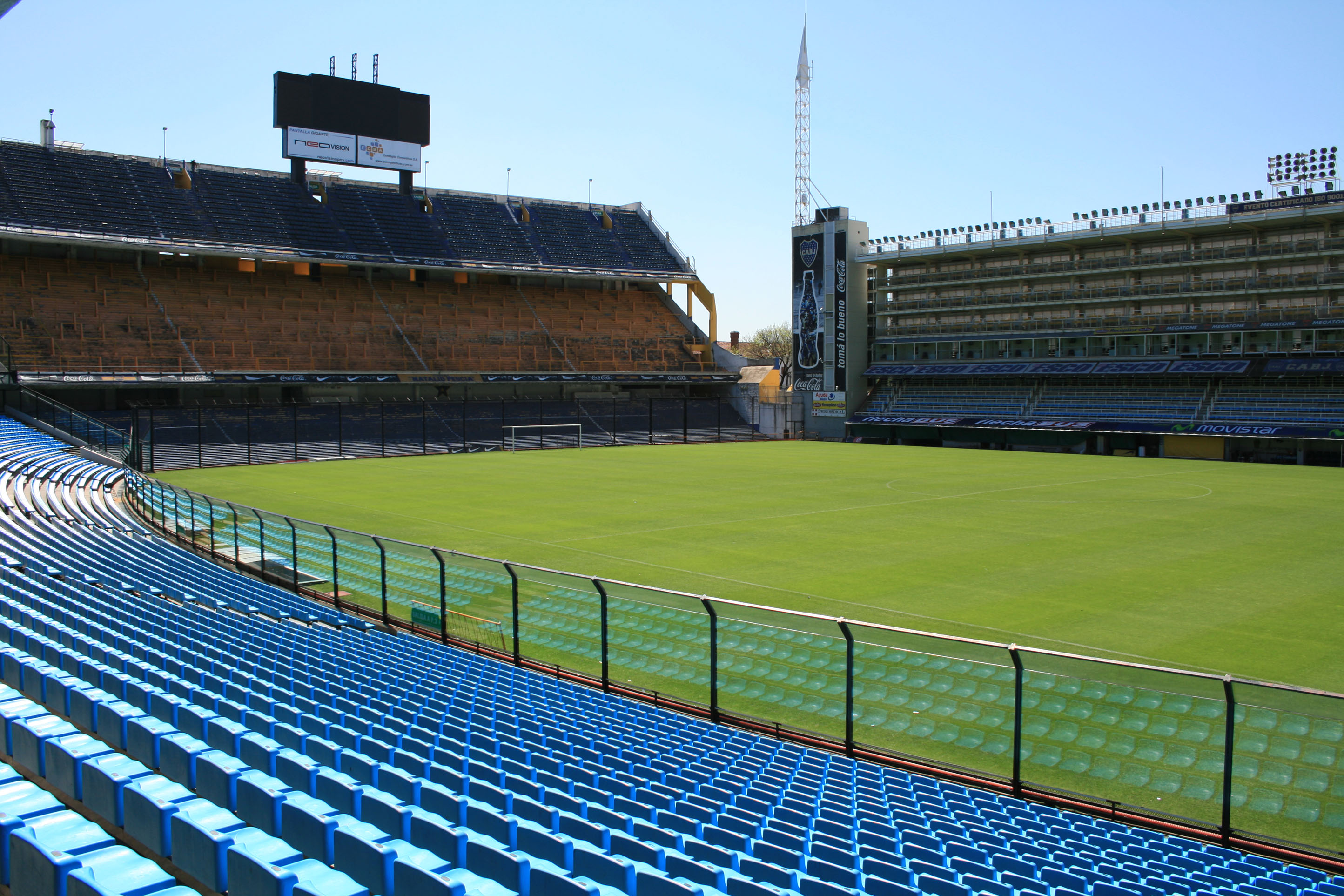
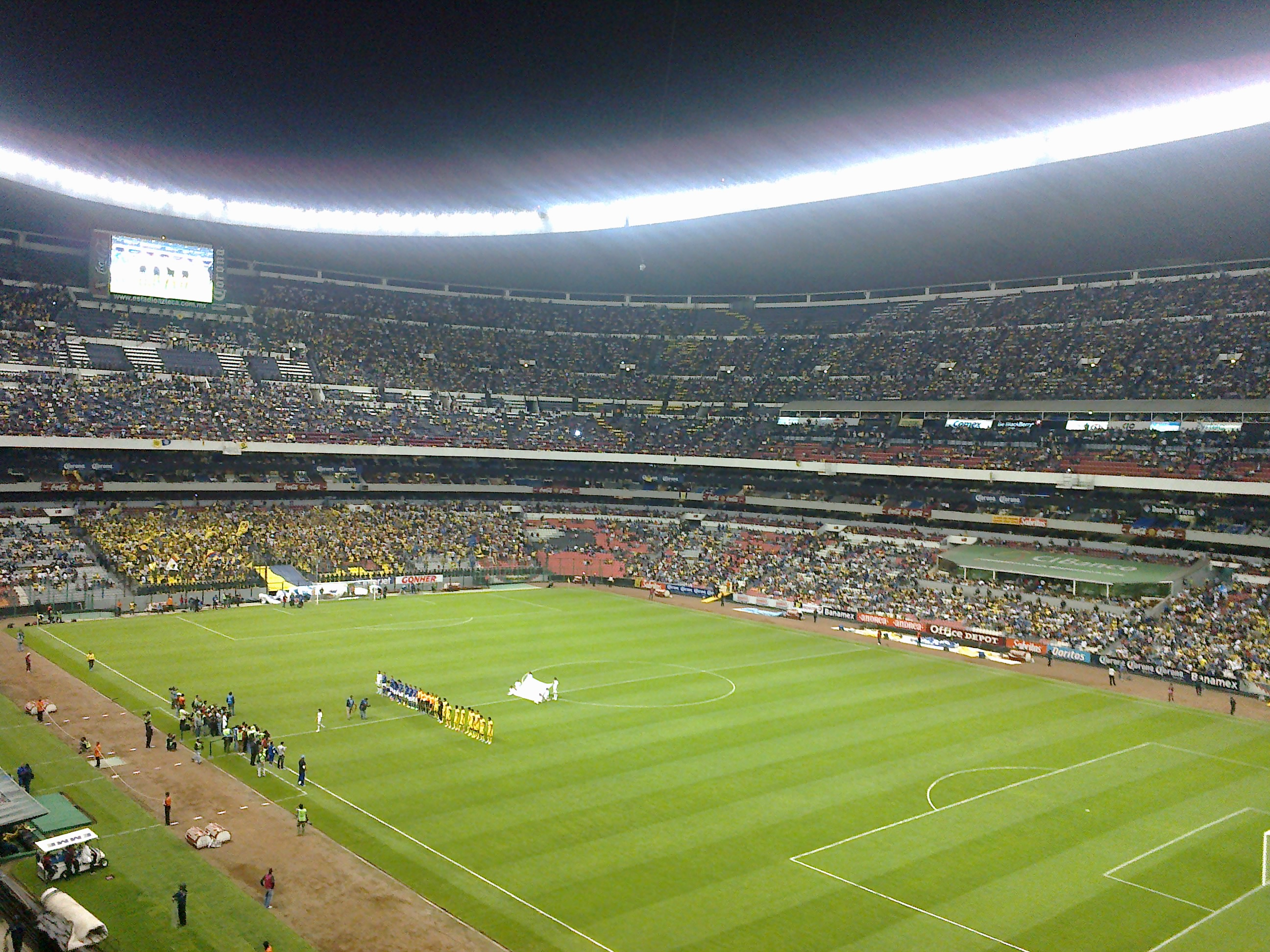
La Bombonera (left) and Estadio Azteca, venues for the series

== Matches ==
=== First leg ===
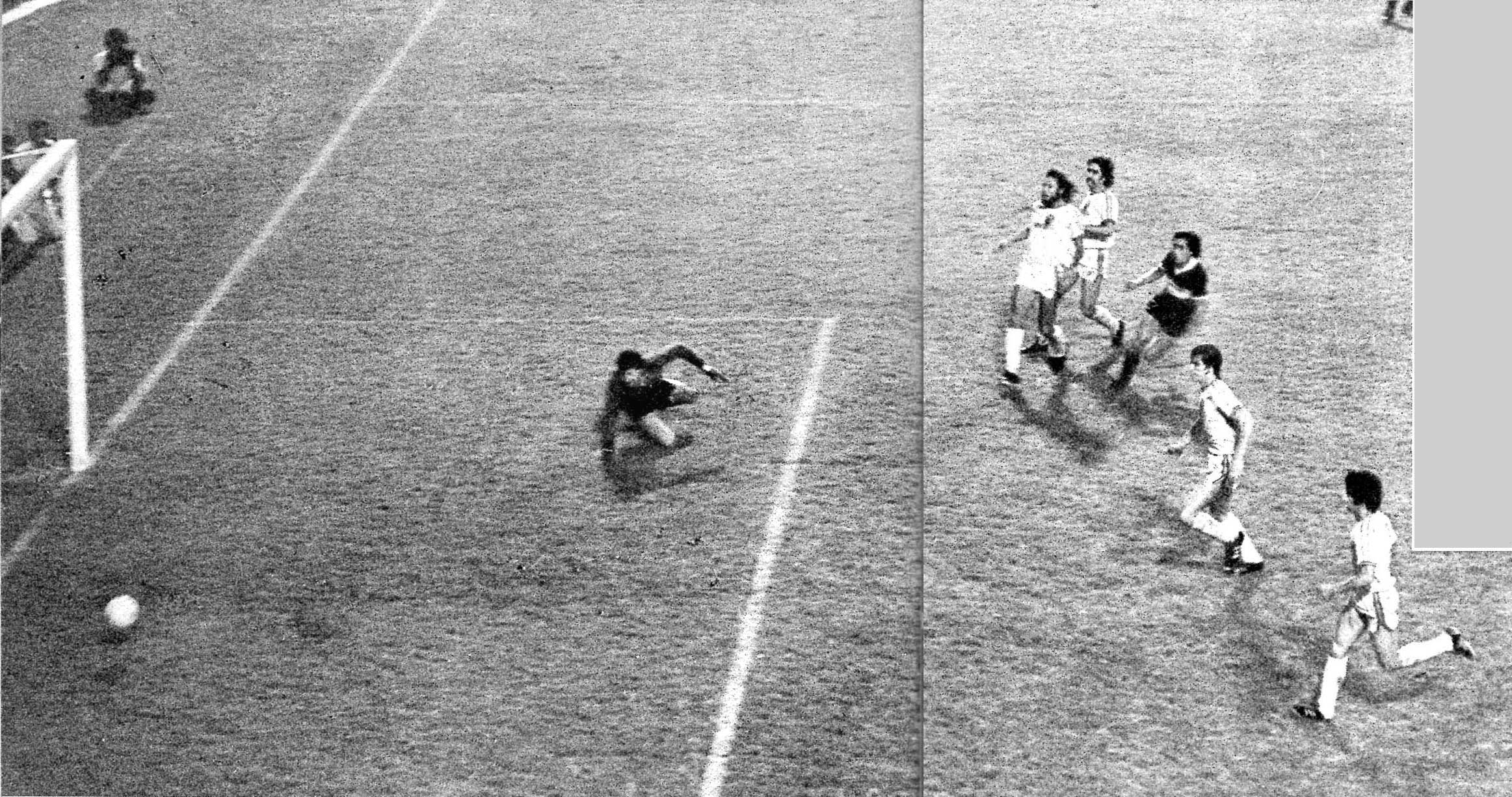
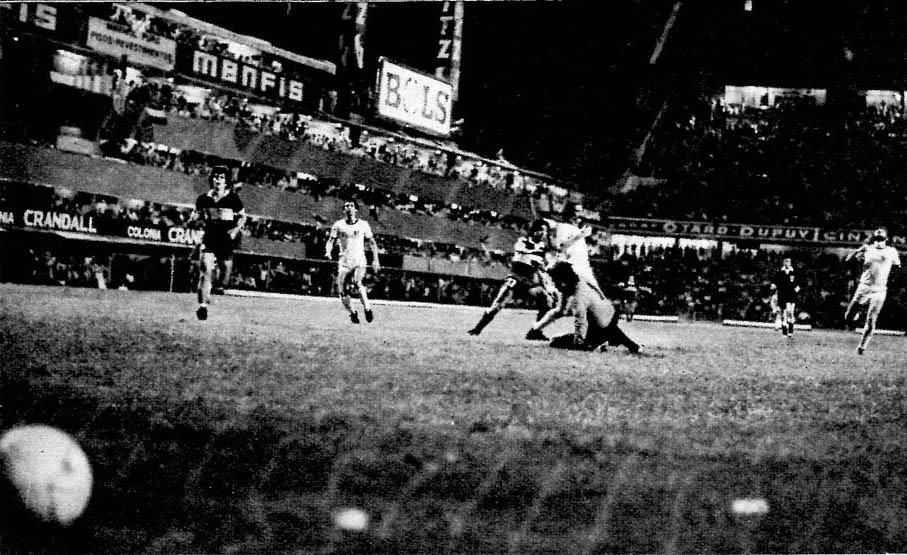
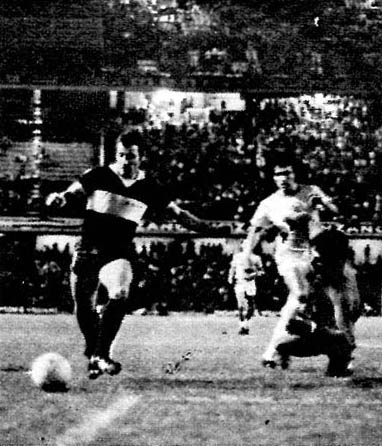
The Boca Juniors goals at La Bombonera, scored by (fltr) Salinas (2) and Mastrángelo
1978 Copa Interamericana
March 28, 1978
First leg

Boca Juniors (Argentina)	3–0	(Mexico) América
Salinas 42', 53'; Mastrángelo 57'	Report (1); Report (2)

La Bombonera, Buenos Aires
Attendance: 25,000
Referee: Ramón Barreto (Uruguay)

**Boca Juniors**
**América**

GK	1	(Argentina) Hugo Gatti
DF	4	(Argentina) Vicente Pernía
DF	2	(Argentina) Francisco Sá
DF	6	(Argentina) Roberto Mouzo
DF	3	(Argentina) Miguel Bordón
MF	10	(Argentina) Jorge Ribolzi
MF	5	(Argentina) Rubén Suñé
MF	18	(Argentina) Mario Zanabria
FW	7	(Argentina) Ernesto Mastrángelo
FW		(Argentina) José Luis Saldaño	(substituted off) 45'
FW	17	(Argentina) Carlos Horacio Salinas
Substitutes:
FW		(Argentina) Carlos Veglio	(substituted on) 45'
Manager:
(Argentina) Juan Carlos Lorenzo

GK	**1**	(Mexico) Francisco Castrejón
DF		(Mexico) René Trujillo
DF		(Mexico) Alfredo Tena
DF		(Mexico) Javier Sánchez Galindo
DF		(Mexico) Jesús Martínez
MF	**7**	(Mexico) Antonio de la Torre
MF		(Mexico) Cesáreo Victorino
MF	**10**	(Paraguay) Hugo Kiese
FW		(Mexico) Cristóbal Ortega
FW		(Ecuador) Ítalo Estupiñán
FW		(Mexico) Agustín Manzo	Substituted off
Substitutes:
FW		(Brazil) Luisinho Lemos	Substituted on
Manager:
(Mexico) Raúl Cárdenas

=== Second leg ===
April 12, 1978
Second leg

América (Mexico)	1–0	(Argentina) Boca Juniors
Kiese 75'	Report (1); Report (2)

Estadio Azteca, Mexico City
Attendance: 40,000
Referee: Luis Siles (Costa Rica)

**América**
**Boca Juniors**

GK	**1**	(Mexico) Francisco Castrejón
DF		(Mexico) René Trujillo
DF		(Mexico) Javier Sánchez Galindo
DF		(Mexico) Eduardo Rergis
DF		(Mexico) Jesús Martínez
MF	**7**	(Mexico) Antonio de la Torre
MF		(Mexico) Chocolate García	(substituted off) 66'
MF	**10**	(Paraguay) Hugo Kiese
FW	**8**	(Chile) Carlos Reinoso
FW	**9**	(Mexico) José de Jesús Aceves
FW		(Brazil) Luisinho Lemos	(substituted off) 66'
Substitutes:
FW		(Mexico) Agustín Manzo	(substituted on) 66'
DF		(Ecuador) Ítalo Estupiñán	(substituted on) 66'
Manager:
(Mexico) Raúl Cárdenas

GK	1	(Argentina) Hugo Gatti
DF	4	(Argentina) Vicente Pernía
DF	2	(Argentina) Francisco Sá
DF	6	(Argentina) Roberto Mouzo
DF	3	(Argentina) Miguel Bordón
MF	10	(Argentina) Jorge Ribolzi
MF	5	(Argentina) Rubén Suñé
MF	18	(Argentina) Mario Zanabria	(substituted off) 80'
FW		(Argentina) Carlos Veglio	(substituted off) 80'
FW	17	(Argentina) Carlos Horacio Salinas
FW	7	(Argentina) Ernesto Mastrángelo
Substitutes:
FW	21	(Argentina) Severiano Pavón	(substituted on) 80'
FW		(Argentina) Carlos Salguero	(substituted on) 80'
Manager:
(Argentina) Juan Carlos Lorenzo

=== Playoff ===
April 14, 1978
Playoff

América (Mexico)	2–1 (a.e.t.)	(Argentina) Boca Juniors
Aceves 35'; Reinoso 119'	Report (1); Report (2)	Pavón 5'

Estadio Azteca, Mexico City
Attendance: 50,000
Referee: Gino D'Hipólito (USA)

**América**	**Boca Juniors**

GK	**1**	(Mexico) Francisco Castrejón
DF		(Mexico) René Trujillo
DF		(Mexico) Javier Sánchez Galindo
DF		(Mexico) Eduardo Rergis	(red card) 58'
DF		(Mexico) Jesús Martínez
MF	**7**	(Mexico) Antonio de la Torre
MF		(Mexico) Chocolate García
MF	**10**	(Paraguay) Hugo Kiese
FW	**8**	(Chile) Carlos Reinoso
FW	**9**	(Mexico) José de Jesús Aceves		(substituted off) 67'
FW		(Brazil) Luisinho Lemos		(substituted off) 66'
Substitutes:
FW		(Ecuador) Ítalo Estupiñán		(substituted on) 66'
DF		(Mexico) Alfredo Tena		(substituted on) 67'
Manager:
(Mexico) Raúl Cárdenas

GK	1	(Argentina) Hugo Gatti
DF	4	(Argentina) Vicente Pernía
DF	2	(Argentina) Francisco Sá
DF	6	(Argentina) Roberto Mouzo
DF	3	(Argentina) Miguel Bordón
MF	10	(Argentina) Jorge Ribolzi
MF	5	(Argentina) Rubén Suñé
MF	18	(Argentina) Mario Zanabria		(substituted off) 77'
FW	21	(Argentina) Daniel Pavón		(substituted off) 89'
FW	17	(Argentina) Carlos Horacio Salinas	(red card) 43'
FW	7	(Argentina) Ernesto Mastrángelo
Substitutes:
DF		(Argentina) Carlos Squeo		(substituted on) 77'
FW		(Argentina) Carlos Salguero		(substituted on) 89'
Manager:
(Argentina) Juan Carlos Lorenzo
