= 1975–76 Mexican Primera División season =

34th professional season of the top-flight football league in Mexico

Primera División de México
- Season: 1975–76
- Champions: América (3rd title)
- Relegated: Atlante
- Champions' Cup: América
- Matches: 396
- Goals: 1,026 (2.59 per match)

Statistics of Mexican Primera División in season 1975–76.

== Overview ==
Tecos was promoted to Primera División.

This season was contested by 20 teams, and América won the championship.

Atlante was relegated to Segunda División.

=== Teams ===
Location of the 1975-76 Primera División teams

Team	City	Stadium
América	Mexico City	Azteca
Atlante	Mexico City	Azteca
Atlas	Guadalajara, Jalisco	Jalisco
Atlético Español	Mexico City	Azteca
Atlético Potosino	San Luis Potosí, S.L.P.	Plan de San Luis
Cruz Azul	Mexico City	Azteca
Guadalajara	Guadalajara, Jalisco	Jalisco
Jalisco	Guadalajara, Jalisco	Jalisco
Laguna	Torreón, Coahuila	San Isidro
León	León, Guanajuato	León
Monterrey	Monterrey, Nuevo León	Universitario
Puebla	Puebla, Puebla	Cuauhtémoc
Tecos	Zapopan, Jalisco	Tres de Marzo
Toluca	Toluca, State of Mexico	Toluca 70
Unión de Curtidores	León, Guanajuato	La Martinica
UANL	Monterrey, Nuevo León	Universitario
UdeG	Guadalajara, Jalisco	Jalisco
UNAM	Mexico City	Olímpico Universitario
Veracruz	Veracruz, Veracruz	Veracruzano
Zacatepec	Zacatepec, Morelos	Agustín "Coruco" Díaz

== Group stage ==
=== Group 1 ===
Pos	Team	Pld	W	D	L	GF	GA	GD	Pts	Qualification
1	América	38	23	7	8	62	40	+22	53	Playoffs
2	Tecos	38	13	11	14	40	52	−12	37	Playoffs
3	Guadalajara	38	11	13	14	47	52	−5	35	
4	Puebla	38	9	10	19	42	61	−19	28	
5	Atletico Potosino	38	10	6	22	40	67	−27	26	Relegation Playoff

=== Group 2 ===
Pos	Team	Pld	W	D	L	GF	GA	GD	Pts	Qualification
1	Monterrey	38	16	12	10	47	37	+10	44	Playoffs
2	Unión de Curtidores	38	10	20	8	52	47	+5	40	Playoffs
3	Atlas	38	13	11	14	59	57	+2	37	
4	UANL	38	12	13	13	50	54	−4	37	
5	Atlante	38	5	17	16	27	53	−26	27	Relegation Playoff

=== Group 3 ===
Pos	Team	Pld	W	D	L	GF	GA	GD	Pts	Qualification
1	Cruz Azul	38	15	14	9	60	38	+22	44	Playoffs
2	UDG	38	15	13	10	51	36	+15	43	Playoffs
3	Atlético Español	38	10	18	10	51	48	+3	38	
4	Zacatepec	38	12	8	18	41	57	−16	32	
5	Veracruz	38	10	12	16	38	64	−26	32	

=== Group 4 ===
Pos	Team	Pld	W	D	L	GF	GA	GD	Pts	Qualification
1	UNAM	38	18	13	7	67	40	+27	49	Playoffs
2	León	38	17	12	9	57	38	+19	46	Playoffs
3	Toluca	38	14	12	12	47	41	+6	40	
4	Laguna	38	12	15	11	53	46	+7	39	
5	Jalisco	38	10	13	15	59	62	−3	33	

== Results ==
Home \ Away	AME	ATT	ATL	ATE	APO	CRA	GDL	JAL	LAG	LEO	MTY	PUE	TOL	UDC	TEC	UNL	UDG	UNM	VER	ZAC
América		0–1	3–2	3–2	1–0	4–2	0–0	2–1	2–1	0–0	1–0	1–0	3–0	1–3	3–1	1–0	0–3	2–1	4–2	4–0
Atlante	0–0		1–1	0–1	1–0	1–1	0–2	1–2	0–0	1–1	0–0	1–0	0–1	1–0	1–1	1–1	0–1	2–2	0–0	0–1
Atlas	0–1	3–2		2–1	5–1	1–2	1–2	2–1	1–3	1–0	0–2	2–2	1–1	0–2	1–1	1–2	2–1	3–1	2–0	0–0
Atlético Español	1–1	3–0	2–2		3–0	2–2	2–2	4–4	1–1	3–1	1–2	0–0	0–0	3–2	2–0	0–0	2–2	1–0	0–0	1–1
Atlético Potosino	0–2	0–1	3–2	2–1		1–0	0–0	2–7	1–3	1–1	1–0	0–4	1–0	1–1	0–1	1–0	1–4	0–1	2–0	6–2
Cruz Azul	2–2	3–2	2–0	1–1	0–0		0–2	1–0	3–2	0–0	0–1	3–1	1–1	2–0	1–0	5–0	2–0	0–0	7–0	2–1
Guadalajara	0–3	5–0	1–2	1–0	1–1	2–1		0–3	0–1	2–2	2–0	3–0	2–4	2–2	2–1	0–0	1–1	1–2	2–3	0–1
Jalisco	3–2	2–2	3–2	0–0	1–2	0–2	2–2		1–1	0–1	1–1	5–2	1–1	0–2	3–4	3–2	1–0	0–0	1–0	2–1
Laguna	0–1	4–2	2–2	2–2	1–0	1–1	1–2	2–2		2–1	1–2	3–1	1–1	3–1	0–1	3–2	0–1	1–1	0–0	0–0
León	2–1	1–1	2–2	3–1	2–1	3–1	1–2	3–1	1–1		0–1	4–2	0–0	2–0	4–1	4–0	1–1	1–1	3–0	0–1
Monterrey	3–1	1–1	1–2	1–2	2–1	0–0	0–0	1–1	2–1	1–2		3–1	3–1	1–2	2–0	0–0	3–1	1–0	2–0	4–3
Puebla	0–1	1–1	2–1	0–2	4–2	0–4	1–0	1–1	1–2	0–1	2–2		1–1	2–0	2–3	2–1	0–3	1–1	4–0	3–2
Toluca	6–0	1–1	1–0	2–1	2–0	1–1	0–0	3–1	0–1	0–0	0–0	0–1		1–1	1–0	1–2	1–0	1–3	2–0	4–0
Unión de Curtidores	1–1	1–1	0–1	4–4	1–0	2–1	1–1	2–1	3–5	1–3	3–0	1–1	4–0		1–1	5–2	2–2	1–1	4–2	1–1
UAG	0–3	2–0	0–0	1–0	1–0	0–0	1–0	2–0	2–2	3–1	2–1	0–0	0–1	0–0		1–2	0–0	1–3	3–0	0–1
UANL	2–1	4–0	2–2	1–2	3–1	2–2	3–1	1–1	0–0	1–0	0–1	0–0	1–1	2–0	2–2		1–0	4–2	3–1	2–2
UDG	1–2	3–0	1–3	0–0	4–2	2–1	1–1	0–0	3–1	0–1	1–1	2–0	0–0	1–1	2–0	1–1		2–2	2–0	1–0
UNAM	0–0	2–0	3–2	3–0	3–1	0–2	4–0	4–3	2–1	3–2	1–1	1–0	2–2	9–0	2–1	2–1	1–0		0–0	3–0
Veracruz	0–3	1–1	2–2	2–0	1–1	2–2	3–2	1–0	0–0	1–2	1–0	2–0	1–0	2–2	1–1	2–0	1–2	1–1		2–1
Zacatepec	0–2	1–0	1–3	0–0	1–4	1–0	4–1	3–1	1–0	0–1	1–1	2–0	0–1	1–2	0–0	2–0	1–2	1–0	3–4	

Legend: Blue = home team win; Yellow = draw; Red = away team win.

== Relegation playoff ==
25 July 1976

Atletico Potosino	2-1	Atlante
Coscia 9'; Davino 36'		Romero 39'

Estadio Plan de San Luis, San Luis Potosí
29 July 1976

Atlante	0-0	Atletico Potosino

Estadio Azteca, Mexico City

Atletico Potosino won 2-1 on aggregate. Atlante was relegated to Segunda División.

== Championship Playoffs ==
=== Bracket ===
Quarterfinals
1	América	1	0	1
8	Tecos	0	0	0
2	UNAM	0	2	2
7	Unión de Curtidores	3	1	4
3	Leon	0	0	0
6	UdeG	5	1	6
4	Cruz Azul	1	1	2
5	Monterrey	5	2	7

Semifinals
1	América	1	1	2
7	Unión de Curtidores	0	0	0
5	Monterrey	1	1	2
6	UdeG	1	2	3

Finals
1	América	3	1	4
6	UdeG	0	0	0

=== Quarterfinal ===
22 July 1976

Tecos	0-1	América
	Report	Alcindo 42'

Estadio Tres de Marzo, Zapopan
25 July 1976

América	0-0	Tecos
	Report

Estadio Azteca, Mexico City

América won 1-0 on aggregate.

21 July 1976

Unión de Curtidores	3-0	UNAM
Cardaccio 50'; Mejía Barón 52' (own); Dávila 90' (pen.)	Report

Estadio León, León
24 July 1976

UNAM	2-1	Unión de Curtidores
Castro 52'; Vergara 62'	Report	Álvarez 80'

Estadio Olímpico Universitario, Mexico City

Unión de Curtidores won 4-2 on aggregate.

21 July 1976

UdeG	5-0	León
Jair 14', 56'; Chavarín 29', 54'; Martínez 90' (pen.)	Report

Estadio Jalisco, Guadalajara
25 July 1976

León	0-1	UdeG
	Report	Chavarín 34'

Estadio León, León

UdeG won 6-0 on aggregate.

21 July 1976

Monterrey	5-1	Cruz Azul
Corbo 45', 59', 80'; Solís 46'; Carlos 87'	Report	Mendizábal 55'

Estadio Universitario, San Nicolás de los Garza
24 July 1976

Cruz Azul	1-2	Monterrey
Vera 8'	Report	Flores 42' (o.g.); Montoya 75'

Estadio Azteca, Mexico City

Monterrey won 7-2 on aggregate.

=== Semi-finals ===
29 July 1976

Unión de Curtidores	0-1	América
	Report	Dávila 73' (o.g.)

Estadio León, León
1 August 1976

América	1-0	Unión de Curtidores
Alcindo 84'	Report

Estadio Azteca, Mexico City

América won 2-0 on aggregate.

28 July 1976

UdeG	1-1	Monterrey
Santoyo 90'	Report	Saldívar 12'

Estadio Jalisco, Guadalajara
31 July 1976

Monterrey	1-2	UdeG
Carlos 40'	Report	Euzébio 30'; Chavarín 89'

Estadio Universitario, San Nicolás de los Garza

UdeG won 3-2 on aggregate.

== Final ==
=== First leg ===
August 4, 1976

UdeG	0-3	América
	Report	Alcindo 48'; Kiesse 87'; Reinoso 90'

Estadio Jalisco, Guadalajara
Referee: Marcel Pérez Guevara

Leones Negros UdeG	América

GK	1	(Mexico) Ignacio Calderón
DF	2	(Mexico) Daniel Montes de Oca
DF	3	(Mexico) Héctor Santoyo
DF	4	(Brazil) Roberto da Silva
DF	5	(Mexico) Manuel Nájera
MF	6	(Mexico) Joel Andrade
MF	7	(Brazil) Euzébio	(substituted off) 63'
MF	8	(Brazil) Jair
FW	9	(Mexico) Ricardo Chavarín
FW	10	(Brazil) Nenê Belarmino
FW	11	(Mexico) Rubén Anguiano	(substituted off) 82'
Substitutes:
MF	12	(Mexico) Raúl Ángel Mañón	(substituted on) 63'
FW	13	(Mexico) Jaime Reyes	(substituted on) 82'
Manager:
(Brazil) José Gomes Nogueira

GK	1	(Mexico) Francisco Castrejón
DF	2	(Mexico) René Trujillo
DF	3	(Mexico) Javier Sánchez Galindo
DF	4	(Argentina) Miguel Ángel Cornero
DF	5	(Mexico) Mario Pérez
MF	6	(Mexico) Javier García López
MF	7	(Mexico) Antonio de la Torre
MF	8	(Mexico) Cesáreo Victorino
FW	9	(Brazil) Alcindo	(substituted off) 84'
FW	10	(Paraguay) Hugo Kiese
LM	11	(Chile) Carlos Reinoso
Substitutes:
FW	12	(Mexico) Alfredo Tena	(substituted on) 84'
Manager:
(Mexico) Raúl Cárdenas

August 8, 1976
12:00

América	1-0	UdeG
Kiesse 63'	Report

Estadio Azteca, Mexico City
Attendance: 105,000
Referee: Marco Antonio Dorantes

Leones Negros UdeG	América

GK	1	(Mexico) Francisco Castrejón
DF	2	(Mexico) René Trujillo
DF	3	(Mexico) Javier Sánchez Galindo
DF	4	(Argentina) Miguel Ángel Cornero
DF	5	(Mexico) Mario Pérez
MF	6	(Mexico) Javier García López
MF	7	(Mexico) Antonio de la Torre
MF	8	(Mexico) Cesáreo Victorino
FW	9	(Chile) Carlos Reinoso
FW	10	(Brazil) Alcindo
FW	11	(Paraguay) Hugo Kiese
Manager:
(Mexico) Raúl Cárdenas

GK	1	(Mexico) Ignacio Calderón
DF	2	(Mexico) Daniel Montes de Oca
DF	3	(Mexico) Héctor Santoyo
DF	4	(Brazil) Roberto da Silva
DF	5	(Mexico) Manuel Nájera
MF	6	(Mexico) Aurelio Martínez
MF	7	(Brazil) Euzébio
MF	8	(Mexico) Ricardo Chavarín	(substituted off) 76'
FW	9	(Mexico) Rubén Anguiano	(substituted off) 45'
FW	10	(Brazil) Nenê Belarmino
FW	11	(Brazil) Jair
Substitutes:
MF	12	(Mexico) Raúl Ángel Mañón	(substituted on) 76'
FW	13	(Mexico) Joel Andrade	(substituted on) 45'
Manager:
(Brazil) José Gomes Nogueira

América won 4-0 on aggregate.

1975–76 winners

3rd title

== Top scorers ==
Player	Nationality	Goals	Club
Cabinho	Brazil	29	Pumas UNAM
Osvaldo Castro	Chile	26	Jalisco
Alacrán Jiménez	Mexico	23	Tigres UANL
Alcindo	Brazil	20	América
Perucci	Brazil	18	Laguna
José de Jesús Aceves	Mexico	17	Atlas
Bernardino García	Mexico	16	Atlas
Roberto Salomone	Argentina	16	León
Ítalo Estupiñán	Ecuador	14	Toluca
Hugo Dávila	Mexico	14	Unión de Curtidores
