= Cristóbal Ortega =

Mexican footballer (1956–2025)

Personal information
- Full name: Cristóbal Ortega Martínez
- Date of birth: 25 July 1956
- Place of birth: Mexico City, Mexico
- Date of death: 2 January 2025 (aged 68)
- Place of death: Mexico City, Mexico
- Position: Midfielder

Senior career*
| Years | Team | Apps | (Gls) |
| 1974–1992 | América | 608 | (36) |
| Total | | 608 | (36) |

International career
| 1977–1986 | Mexico | 24 | (4) |
- * Club domestic league appearances and goals

Cristóbal Ortega Martínez (25 July 1956 – 2 January 2025) was a Mexican professional footballer who played as a midfielder for América in the Mexican Primera División from 1974 to 1992. He also played for the Mexico national team, including playing in the World Cups of 1978 and 1986. He earned 24 caps and scored four goals in his international career.

== Club career ==
On 5 October 1974, Cristóbal Ortega made his debut for Club América against Ciudad Madero. In his Primera Liga debut on 8 June 1975, Ortega scored his first goal against Veracruz - so began an 18-year career in which he remained in the Club América midfield. Club América won league titles in the seasons 1975–76, 1983–84, 1984–85, Prode 1985, 1987-88 and 1988–89. The club won three Supercups, in 1976, 1988–89; three CONCACAF Cup titles in 1978, 1987, and 1991; and the Interamerican Cup in 1991.

Ortega retired in the middle of the 1991–92 season. In his final game for Club América, on 15 December 1991 at Santos Laguna, he started and was substituted at the start of the second half by manager Isaac Terrazas; he scored his last goal three years prior on 3 January 1988, against Cruz Azul. In his career at Club América, Ortega played in 711 games, including a team-record 75 playoff games.

== International career ==
Ortega played in 24 games for Mexico and scored four goals. He played in the World Cups of 1978 and 1986.

== Illness and death ==
Ortega suffered from cancer for several years. He was readmitted to a hospital in December 2024, after undergoing surgery for the disease earlier that year. However, it had metastasised, and he died on 2 January 2025, at the age of 68.

== Honours ==
América

- Méxican Primera División: 1975–76, 1983–84, 1984–85, Prode-1985, 1987–88, 1988–89
- Campeón de Campeones: 1976, 1988, 1989
- CONCACAF Champions' Cup: 1977, 1987, 1990
- Copa Interamericana: 1977, 1991

Mexico

- CONCACAF Championship: 1977

Individual

- Mexican Primera División Golden Ball: 1982–83

== Sources ==
- Cristobal Ortega trabaja para que sus Albinegros sean contundentes (Spanish; article dated 22 January 2009)
