= 1977 CONCACAF Champions' Cup =

13th edition of premier club football tournament organized by CONCACAF

Copa de Campeones Concacaf
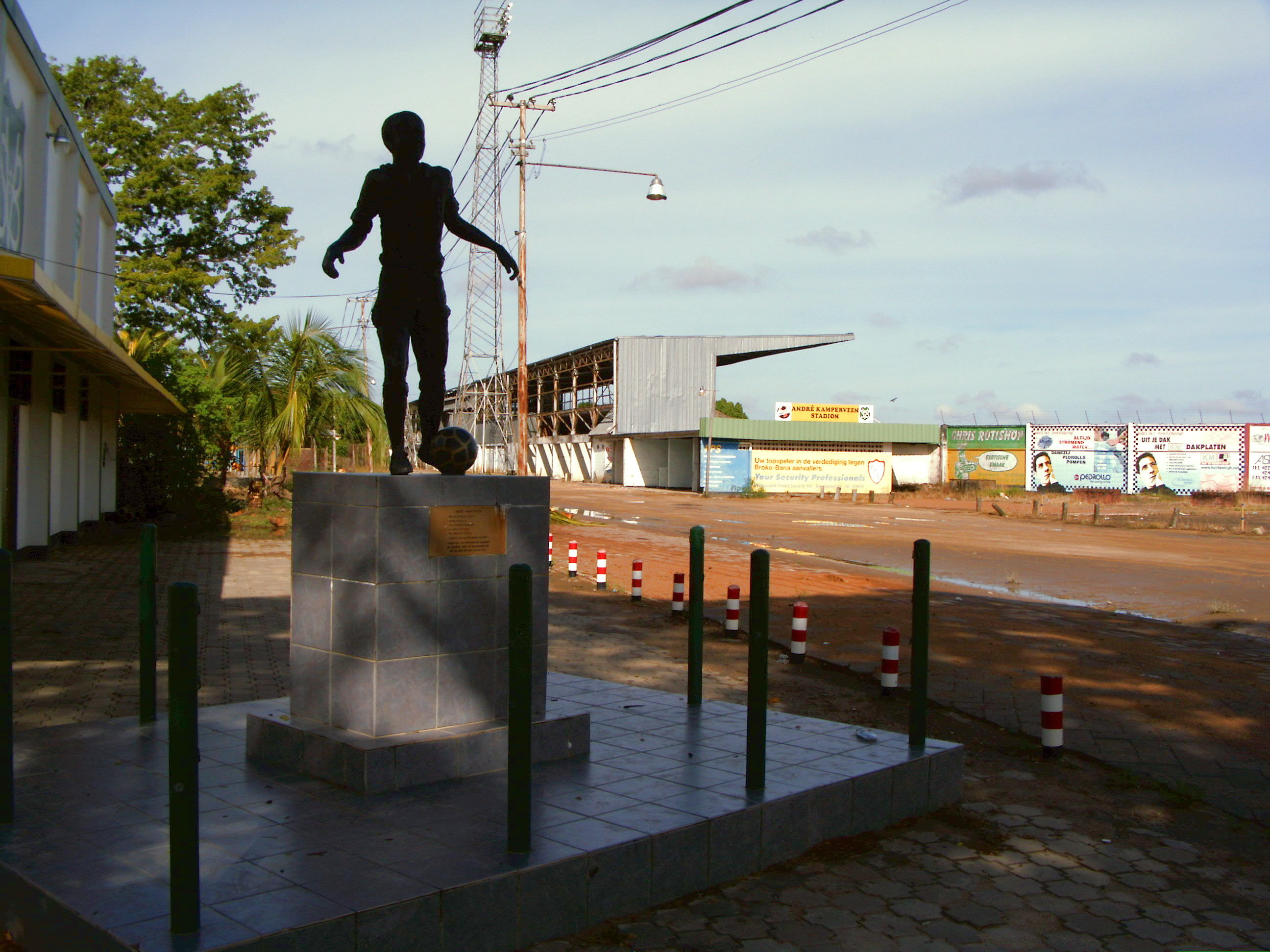
- The National Stadion in Paramaribo hosted the final
- Dates: 17 April 1977 – 18 February 1978

Final positions
- Champions: (Mexico) América
- Runners-up: (Suriname) Robinhood

The 1977 CONCACAF Champions' Cup was the 13th edition of the annual international club football competition held in the CONCACAF region (North America, Central America and the Caribbean), the CONCACAF Champions' Cup. It determined that year's club champion of association football in the CONCACAF region and was played from 17 April 1977 till 18 February 1978.

The teams were split in 3 zones (North American, Central American and Caribbean), each one qualifying the winner to the final tournament, where the winners of the North and Central zones played a semi-final to decide who was going to play against the Caribbean champion in the final. All the matches in the tournament were played under the home/away match system.

Mexican club América beat Surinamese side Robinhood in the final, winning their first CONCACAF champion cup.

== North American Zone ==
Team 1	Agg.	Team 2	1st leg	2nd leg
América (Mexico)	w/o	(United States) New York Inter-Giuliana		

- New York Inter-Giuliana withdrew
- América advances to the CONCACAF Semi-Final.

== Central American Zone ==
=== First round ===
Torneo Centroamericano de Concacaf 1977

Team 1	Agg.	Team 2	1st leg	2nd leg
Águila (El Salvador)	1–3	(Guatemala) Municipal	0–2	1–1
Diriangén (Nicaragua)	w/o	(Costa Rica) Barrio México	2–0	2–0
Saprissa (Costa Rica)	w/o	(Honduras) Real España	{{{6}}}	{{{7}}}

- Motagua: Bye

17 April 1977	Águila (El Salvador)	0–2	(Guatemala) Municipal	San Salvador, El Salvador
			Goal	Stadium: Estadio Flor Blanca

5 May 1977	Municipal (Guatemala)	1–1 (3–1 agg.)	(El Salvador) Águila	Guatemala City, Guatemala
	Miguel Angel Coban		Alfredo Vasquez	Stadium: Estadio Doroteo Guamuch Flores

- Barrio México did not have match dates communicated to them by CONCACAF, and failed to appear for the first leg: CONCACAF awarded both legs to Diriangén 2-0.
- Real España withdrew.
- Municipal, Diriangén and Saprissa advanced to the second round.

=== Second round ===
Team 1	Agg.	Team 2	1st leg	2nd leg
Municipal (Guatemala)	16–2	(Nicaragua) Diriangén	13–1	3–1
Saprissa (Costa Rica)	w/o	(Honduras) Motagua	{{{6}}}	{{{7}}}

- Motagua withdrew.
- Municipal and Saprissa advance to the third round.

12 June 1977	Municipal (Guatemala)	13–1	(Nicaragua) Diriangén	Guatemala City, Guatemala
	Julio César Anderson		Mauricio Cruz	Stadium: Estadio Doroteo Guamuch Flores

26 June 1977	Diriangén (Nicaragua)	1–3 (16-2 agg.)	(Guatemala) Municipal	Diriamba
	TBD		José Emilio Mitrovich; Julio César Anderson	Stadium: Estadio Colegio La Salle

=== Third round ===
Team 1	Agg.	Team 2	1st leg	2nd leg
Municipal (Guatemala)	1–3	(Costa Rica) Saprissa	1–2	0–1

- Saprissa advances to the CONCACAF Semi-Final.

10 July 1977	Municipal (Guatemala)	1–2	(Costa Rica) Saprissa	Guatemala City, Guatemala
	Omar Sanzogni		Wilbert Barquero; Gerardo Solano	Stadium: Estadio Doroteo Guamuch Flores

24 July 1977	Saprissa (Costa Rica)	1–0 (3–1 agg.)	(Guatemala) Municipal	San Juan de Tibás
				Stadium: Estadio Ricardo Saprissa Aymá

== Caribbean Zone ==
=== First round ===
Team 1	Agg.	Team 2	1st leg	2nd leg
Defence Force (Trinidad and Tobago)	0 - 4	(Haiti) Violette	0 - 2	0 - 2
Pele (Guyana)	3 - 4	(Suriname) Voorwaarts	2 - 0	1 - 4
Robinhood (Suriname)	6 - 0	(Guyana) YMCA	5 - 0	1 - 0
TECSA (Trinidad and Tobago)	w/o	(Haiti) Victory		

- Victory withdrew.
- Violette and Robinhood advanced to the Second Round.
- Voorwaarts on a bye to the Third Round.
- TECSA on a bye to the Fourth Round.

Defence Force (Trinidad and Tobago)	0–2	(Haiti) Violette

Violette (Haiti)	2-0 (4-0 agg.)	(Trinidad and Tobago) Defence Force

Pele (Guyana)	2–0	(Suriname) Voorwaarts

Voorwaarts (Suriname)	4-1 (4-3 agg.)	(Guyana) Pele

Robinhood (Suriname)	5–0	(Guyana) YMCA

YMCA (Guyana)	0-1 (0-6 agg.)	(Suriname) Robinhood

=== Second round ===
Team 1	Agg.	Team 2	1st leg	2nd leg
Violette (Haiti)	0 - 1	(Suriname) Robinhood	0 - 0	0 - 1

- Robinhood advanced to the third round.

Violette (Haiti)	0–0	(Suriname) Robinhood

Robinhood (Suriname)	1-0 (1-0 agg.)	(Haiti) Violette

=== Third round ===
Team 1	Agg.	Team 2	1st leg	2nd leg
Voorwaarts (Suriname)	2 - 3	(Suriname) Robinhood	0 - 1	2 - 2

- Robinhood advanced to the fourth round.

Voorwaarts (Suriname)	0-1	(Suriname) Robinhood

Robinhood (Suriname)	2-2 (3-2 agg.)	(Suriname) Voorwaarts
TBD

=== Fourth round ===
Team 1	Agg.	Team 2	1st leg	2nd leg
TECSA (Trinidad and Tobago)	2 - 4	(Suriname) Robinhood	1 - 1	1 - 3

- Robinhood advanced to the CONCACAF Champions'Cup Final.

TECSA (Trinidad and Tobago)	1–1	(Suriname) Robinhood

Robinhood (Suriname)	3-1 (4-2 agg.)	(Trinidad and Tobago) TECSA

== CONCACAF Final Series ==
=== Semi-final ===
Team 1	Agg.	Team 2	1st leg	2nd leg
América (Mexico)	w/o	(Costa Rica) Saprissa		

- Saprissa withdrew.
- América advances to the CONCACAF Final.

== Final ==
=== First leg ===
1977 CONCACAF Champions' Cup Final
January 15, 1978
First leg

Robinhood (Suriname)	0–1	(Mexico) América
	Report	Luizinho 49'

National Stadion, Paramaribo

=== Second leg ===
January 17, 1978
Second leg

Robinhood (Suriname)	1–1	(Mexico) América
Emanuelson	Report (1); Report (2)	Kiesse 70'

National Stadion, Paramaribo
Attendance: 5,000

Team details

América
Robinhood

GK	(Mexico) Pedro Soto
DF	(Mexico) Jesús Martínez D.
DF	(Mexico) Javier Sánchez G.
DF	(Mexico) Alfredo Tena
DF	(Mexico) Mario Pérez
MF	(Mexico) Narciso Ramírez
MF	(Mexico) Antonio de la Torre
MF	(Paraguay) Hugo Kiese
FW	(Chile) Carlos Reinoso	(substituted on) a'
FW	(Ecuador) Ítalo Estupiñán
FW	(Brazil) Luizinho
Substitutions:
FW	(Mexico) José Aceves	(substituted on) a'
Manager:
(Mexico) Raúl Cárdenas

GK	(Suriname)
DF	(Suriname)
DF	(Suriname)
DF	(Suriname)
DF	(Suriname)
MF	(Suriname)
MF	(Suriname)
MF	(Suriname)
MF	(Suriname)
FW	(Suriname)
FW	(Suriname)
Manager:
(Suriname)

- América won 2–1 on aggregate.

== Champion ==
CONCACAF Champions' Cup
1977 Champions
(Mexico)
América
First title
