= Enrique Borja =

Mexican footballer (born 1945)

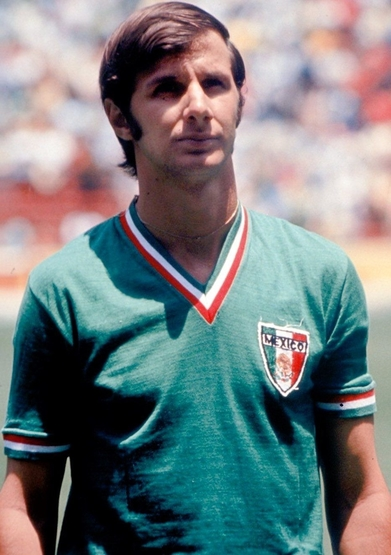
- Borja in 1970

Personal information
- Full name: Enrique David Borja García
- Date of birth: 30 December 1945 (age 80)
- Place of birth: Mexico City, Mexico
- Height: 1.85 m (6 ft 1 in)
- Position: Forward

Senior career*
Years	Team	Apps	(Gls)
1964–1969	UNAM	112	(69)
1969–1977	América	191	(99)
Total		303	(168)

International career
1966–1975	Mexico	65	(31)
- * Club domestic league appearances and goals

Enrique David Borja García (born 30 December 1945) is a Mexican former professional footballer who played as a forward.

== Career ==
Borja was recruited by Universidad Nacional at the age of 17. He made his professional debut for the club on 1 March 1964 in a Copa Mexico match against Zacatepec, and made his league debut a year later. Borja quickly established himself as a key player, becoming the league's second-leading scorer during the 1968-69 season.

On 27 March 1969, Borja was transferred to Club América for a fee of 400,000 pesos. According to statements made by the club's president, the player's transfer was due to his desire for a salary increase, which the institution was unable to provide at that time. Borja, who was not in agreement with the transfer, sought to halt the move. On 4 July, Borja and Club América reached an agreement.

Borja achieved notable success at Club América, leading the league in scoring for three consecutive seasons and winning five trophies, including two Primera División titles. He scored over 100 goals in all competitions for the club before retiring from professional football in September 1977.

On the international stage, Borja made 65 appearances for Mexico over a nine-year period, scoring 31 goals. He represented his home country at the FIFA World Cup in 1966 and 1970. Borja retired from the national team as its all-time leading goalscorer, a record he held for two decades until Carlos Hermosillo surpassed it.

== After retirement ==
Borja has been the club president of Club Necaxa and of the Federación Mexicana de Fútbol Asociación.

He was co-commentator for the American television network, Univision, for the FIFA World Cup Germany 2006 tournament (June – July 2006), with Fernando Fiore, a veteran Univision sports commentator.

On 31 October 2007, he signed as club president for Tigres UANL of Mexico after the destitution of Fernando Urdiales from the team. He was destituted of the Presidency of Tigres UANL 25 May 2009.

== Career statistics ==
Scores and results list Mexico's goal tally first, score column indicates score after each Borja goal.

List of international goals scored by Enrique Borja
No.	Date	Venue	Opponent	Score	Result	Competition
1	11 May 1966	Estadio Olímpico Universitario, Mexico City, Mexico	Chile	1–0	1–0	Friendly
2	13 July 1966	Wembley Stadium, London, England	France	1–0	1–1	1966 FIFA World Cup
3	5 January 1967	Estadio Azteca, Mexico City, Mexico	Switzerland	2–0	3–0	Friendly
4	5 January 1967	Estadio Azteca, Mexico City, Mexico	Switzerland	3–0	3–0	Friendly
5	6 December 1967	Estadio Azteca, Mexico City, Mexico	Hungary	1–1	2–1	Friendly
6	21 May 1968	Estadio Azteca, Mexico City, Mexico	Uruguay	2–2	3–3	Friendly
7	10 July 1968	Estadio Azteca, Mexico City, Mexico	Brazil	1–0	2–1	Friendly
8	10 July 1968	Estadio Azteca, Mexico City, Mexico	Brazil	2–0	2–1	Friendly
9	16 October 1968	Estadio El Campín, Bogotá, Colombia	Colombia	1–0	1–0	Friendly
10	20 October 1968	Estadio Nacional, Lima, Peru	Peru	1–3	3–3	Friendly
11	23 October 1968	Estadio Nacional, Santiago, Chile	Chile	1–3	1–3	Friendly
12	26 October 1968	Estadio Centenario, Montevideo, Uruguay	Uruguay	1–0	2–0	Friendly
13	3 November 1968	Mineirão, Belo Horizonte, Brazil	Brazil	1–2	1–2	Friendly
14	1 January 1969	Estadio Azteca, Mexico City, Mexico	Italy	1–0	2–3	Friendly
15	22 January 1969	Estadio Azteca, Mexico City, Mexico	Denmark	3–0	3–0	Friendly
16	22 May 1969	Estadio León, León, Mexico	Peru	1–0	3–0	Friendly
17	22 May 1969	Estadio León, León, Mexico	Peru	2–0	3–0	Friendly
18	18 September 1971	Zentralstadion, Leipzig, East Germany	East Germany	1–1	1–1	Friendly
19	30 September 1971	Toumba Stadium, Thessaloniki, Greece	Greece	1–0	1–0	Friendly
20	6 October 1971	Bermuda National Stadium, Hamilton, Bermuda	Bermuda	1–0	2–0	1971 CONCACAF Championship qualification
21	13 October 1971	Estadio Azteca, Mexico City, Mexico	Bermuda	1–0	4–0	1971 CONCACAF Championship qualification
22	5 April 1972	Estadio Azteca, Mexico City, Mexico	Peru	2–1	2–1	Friendly
23	9 August 1972	Estadio Nacional, Lima, Peru	Peru	1–0	2–3	Friendly
24	16 August 1972	Estadio Nacional, Santiago, Chile	Chile	2–0	2–0	Friendly
25	3 September 1972	Estadio Azteca, Mexico City, Mexico	United States	3–0	3–1	1973 CONCACAF Championship qualification
26	12 October 1972	Estadio Azteca, Mexico City, Mexico	Costa Rica	1–0	3–1	Friendly
27	12 October 1972	Estadio Azteca, Mexico City, Mexico	Costa Rica	2–0	3–1	Friendly
28	12 October 1972	Estadio Azteca, Mexico City, Mexico	Costa Rica	3–0	3–1	Friendly
29	6 February 1973	Estadio Azteca, Mexico City, Mexico	Argentina	1–0	2–0	Friendly
30	8 December 1973	Stade Sylvio Cator, Port-au-Prince, Haiti	Haiti	1–0	1–0	1973 CONCACAF Championship
31	24 August 1975	Estadio Azteca, Mexico City, Mexico	United States	1–0	2–0	Friendly

== Honours ==
América

- Mexican Primera División: 1970–71, 1975–76
- Copa México: 1973–74
- Campeón de Campeones: 1976
- CONCACAF Champions' Cup: 1977

Individual

- Mexican Primera División Top Scorer: 1970–71, 1971–72, 1972–73
