= Eliomar Marcón =

Brazilian footballer (born 1975)

Personal information
- Full name: Eliomar Marcón
- Date of birth: November 15, 1975 (age 50)
- Place of birth: Seberi, Brazil
- Height: 1.75 m (5 ft 9 in)
- Position: Forward

Team information
- Current team: Esporte Clube Guarani

Senior career*
| Years | Team | Apps | (Gls) |
- Esporte Clube Guarani
| 1998–2002 | Defensor Sporting | 150 | (88) |
| 2003 | S.S.C. Venezia (loan) | 10 | (1) |
| 2003–2006 | Tecos UAG | 102 | (40) |
| 2006–2007 | Santos Laguna | 30 | (4) |
| 2007 | Indios de Ciudad Juarez | 8 | (1) |
| 2008 | Nautico | | |
| 2009 | Brasil de Farroupilha | | |
| 2010 | Esporte Clube Guarani | | |
- * Club domestic league appearances and goals as of 05:04, 30 October 2007 (UTC)

Eliomar Marcon (born November 15, 1975, in Seberi, Rio Grande do Sul) is a Brazilian striker as of 2008 playing for the Brazilian professional football club Nautico of the Brasileirao "Serie A".

== Football career ==
On 31 January 2003, he was on loan to S.S.C. Venezia.

=== Mexico ===
He exploded onto the scene in the Apertura 2003 with 10 goals in 20 games leading his team to the repechaje where Tecos lost to Cruz Azul. He finished his career with Tecos with 40 goals in 102 games. After the Clausura 2006 he left Tecos UAG and signed with Santos Laguna for an undisclosed amount of money. Eliomar has struggled to find his place with Santos Laguna only scoring 4 goals in 30 games. In Apertura 2007 Marcon arrived to Indios de Ciudad Juarez as the premier booking of the season but after a few games into the season he was severely injured and was out for the rest of the 2007 Apertura in which Indios were champions.
