= René Trujillo =

Mexican footballer (born 1947)

Personal information
- Full name: René Lisandro Trujillo Caloca
- Date of birth: 4 September 1947 (age 79)
- Place of birth: Mexico City, Mexico
- Position: Defender

Senior career*
Years	Team	Apps	(Gls)
1966–1968	Pumas UNAM		
1968–1979	América		

International career
1972–1977	Mexico	8	(1)
Medal record
Men's football
Representing Mexico
CONCACAF Championship
Gold medal – first place	1977 Mexico	Team
- * Club domestic league appearances and goals

René Lisandro Trujillo Caloca (born 4 September 1947) is a retired Mexican footballer. Nicknamed "Popeye", he played as a defender for Pumas UNAM and América throughout the 1970s. He also represented Mexico internationally for the 1977 CONCACAF Championship.

== Club career ==
Trujillo began his career within Pumas UNAM for their 1966–67 season with a poor 13th place finish. Despite a significant improvement in the following 1967–68 season as runners-up, Trujillo later signed for América for their 1968–69 season. Throughout his career the Aguilas, he played alongside other players such as Enrique Borja, Monito Rodríguez, Prudencio Cortés, Mario Pérez and Carlos Reinoso, notably playing with comedian Polo Polo. Trujillo also helped the club win the 1970–71 and 1975–76 Mexican Primera División as well as winning the 1973–74 Copa México. He remained with the club until his retirement following their 1978–79.

== International career ==
Trujillo made his international debut in a friendly against Chile in a 0–2 victory on 16 August 1972 but wouldn't make another international appearance until appearing in another friendly against Brazil in a 1–1 away draw on 31 March 1974. That year also saw Trujillo score the winning goal in a 0–1 away match against rivals United States on 8 September. He continued to play in various friendlies into the late 1970s with his most significant contribution to the Tricolor came during the 1977 CONCACAF Championship as he was part of the squad that gave a 8–1 thrashing to Suriname on 15 October 1977. Despite Mexico ultimately qualifying for the 1978 FIFA World Cup, Trujillo was not named in the final roster for the tournament and never returned to international football.
