= Cornero =

Cornero is a surname. Notable people with the surname include:

- Anthony Cornero (1899–1955), Italian-born American bootlegger and gambling entrepreneur
- Lola Cornero (1892–1980), Dutch film actress
- Miguel Ángel Cornero (1952–1999), Argentine footballer
