= Alfredo Tena =

Mexican footballer and coach (born 1956)

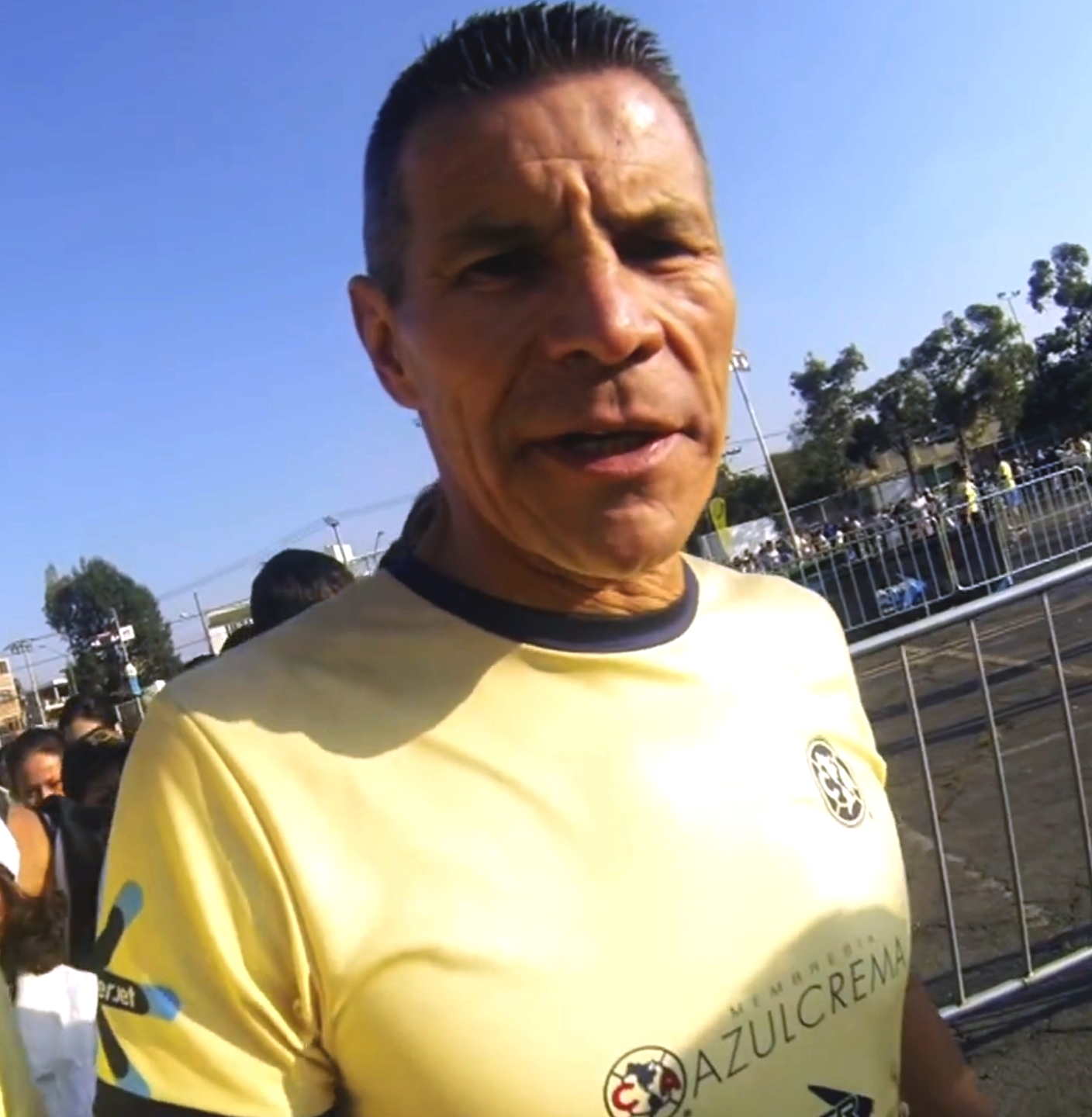
- Tena in 2016

Personal information
- Full name: Alfredo Tena Garduño
- Date of birth: 21 November 1956 (age 69)
- Place of birth: Mexico City, Mexico
- Height: 1.85 m (6 ft 1 in)
- Position: Defender

Senior career*
Years	Team	Apps	(Gls)
1974–1991	América	603	(34)
1991–1992	Tecos UAG	2	(0)
Total		605	(34)

International career
1976–1991	Mexico	30	(0)

Managerial career
- 1993–1995: Puebla
- 1995–1998: Santos Laguna
- 1998–1999: Puebla
- 1999–2000: América
- 2001–2003: Pachuca
- 2003–2004: Querétaro
- 2005: Pachuca
- 2006: Veracruz
- 2006–2007: América (Assistant)
- 2011: América (Interim)
- 2012–2014: Espanyol (Assistant)
- 2014–2015: Morelia
- 2016: León (Assistant)
- 2023–2025: Mexico U21
- * Club domestic league appearances and goals

Alfredo Tena Garduño (born 21 November 1956), also known by his nickname Capitán Furia ("Captain Fury"), is a Mexican football manager and former professional footballer.

Tena devoted nearly his entire playing career to Club América, becoming the club’s second most capped player and a pillar of the squad that secured six Primera División championships. As a manager, he has led seven different clubs in Mexican football, winning two Primera División titles.

His brother, Luis Fernando, is also a manager and former footballer. He is also the father of footballer Alfredo Omar.

== Club career ==
Tena was born on November 21, 1956, in Mexico City. From a very young age, his passion for football was evident on the pitch. As a player, he excelled as a centre-back and quickly established himself as a natural leader on the field.

He made his professional debut with Club América in 1974, a team he would go on to represent for the next 17 years. From the start, he displayed remarkable qualities that earned him the captain’s armband for nearly his entire career with the Águilas.

Over the course of his career, he won six Primera División titles, three CONCACAF Champions Cup and lifted the Interamerican Cup twice.

His playing career came to an end in 1992 with Tecos UAG, where he appeared in just two matches before transitioning into coaching.

Tena also represented the Mexico national team, earning 30 caps. He played for El Tri at the 1978 FIFA World Cup in Argentina.

== Managerial career ==
Tena's managerial career began in 1993 with Puebla. Two years later, he took charge of Santos Laguna. There, he achieved his first league championship as a coach, the Inverno 1996.

He returned to Club América in 1999, this time as manager. He coached three tournaments and led the team to the semifinal of the 2000 Copa Libertadores.

After a year away from coaching, he took the reins of Pachuca in 2001. During his tenure with the club, he captured his second league championship as a coach, the Invierno 2001, and became the first Mexican to win the CONCACAF Champions Cup both as a player and as a coach.

Later, he managed Querétaro in the Apertura 2003, but results were poor: one win, three draws, and eight losses. He began the Clausura 2004 but lasted only three matches, all ending in draws. In the Clausura 2005, he returned to Pachuca, but his record remained disappointing, with just one win in five games.

In the Clausura 2006, he joined Veracruz, where he endured his most difficult spell, losing all five matches he managed. Later that year, Tena returned once more to Club América, this time not as head coach but as assistant to his brother, Luis Fernando Tena.

In 2012, he joined the technical staff of Javier Aguirre at Espanyol. In December 2014, he became the head coach of Monarcas Morelia. In May 2017, he was appointed director of Club América’s youth academy. In December 2023, Tena was named manager of the Mexico national U-21 team.

== Honours ==
=== Player ===
América

- Primera División: 1975–76, 1983–84, 1984–85, Prode 85, 1987–88, 1988–89
- Campeón de Campeones: 1976, 1988, 1989
- CONCACAF Champions' Cup: 1978, 1987, 1990
- Copa Interamericana: 1977, 1990

Mexico

- CONCACAF Championship: 1977

=== Manager ===
Santos Laguna

- Primera División: Invierno 1996

Pachuca

- Primera División: Invierno 2001
- CONCACAF Champions' Cup: 2002
