= José de Jesús Aceves =

Mexican footballer (born 1952)

Personal information
- Full name: José de Jesús Aceves Padilla
- Date of birth: 9 February 1953 (age 73)
- Place of birth: Guadalajara, Jalisco, Mexico
- Position: Forward

Youth career
- 1967–1970: Atlas

Senior career*
| Years | Team | Apps | (Gls) |
| 1970–1976 | Atlas | | |
| 1976–1978 | América | | |
| 1978–1980 | Atlante | | |
| 1980–1981 | Tampico | | (5) |
| 1981–1983 | Tecos UAG | | (17) |
| 1983–1986 | Atlas | | |
| 1986–1987 | Tigres UANL | | |
| 1987–1988 | Atlas | | |
| 1988–1990 | Tigres UANL | | |

International career
| 1976–1977 | Mexico | 9 | (1) |
Medal record
Men's football
Representing Mexico
CONCACAF Championship
| Gold medal – first place | 1977 Mexico | Team |
- * Club domestic league appearances and goals

José de Jesús Aceves Padilla (born 9 February 1953) is a retired Mexican footballer. Nicknamed "Güero", he played as a forward for Atlas, América and Tigres UANL throughout the 1970s and the 1980s. He also represented Mexico internationally for the 1977 CONCACAF Championship.

== Club career ==
Following his youth career under Ramón Cano Figueroa, Aceves began his career within Atlas for their 1970–71 season where he was brought up around the same time as other players such as Ricardo Chavarín, Héctor Brambila and Jaime Pajarito. His debut season would be a terrible one as Atlas were ultimately relegated from the top-flight of Mexican football. In spite of this initial setback however, the Rojinegros immediately bounced back and immediately achieved re-promotion following their success within the 1971–72 Mexican Segunda División. This would be his only title with Atlas as following a few mediocre seasons, he was then signed to América for their 1976–77 season. Despite only spending two seasons within the Águilas, he had an incredibly successful tenure as he tied with former América player Toninho for having one of the best match-to-goal ratio within the playoffs of the Liga MX. He also enjoyed success in international competitions as he was part of the winning squads for the 1977 CONCACAF Champions' Cup as well as the 1978 Copa Interamericana.

Following brief spells with Tampico for the 1980–81 season and Tecos UAG for two seasons, Aceves returned to Atlas with his notable contribution during his second tenure with the club being during the 1984–85 season where the Rojinegros had achieved surmountable success in the 1984–85 Mexican Primera División and advanced to the final knockout stage, narrowly losing to his former club of América through penalties. The remainder of his career was spent between playing for Tigres UANL and Atlas interchangeably with Aceves cementing himself as the top league scorer for Atlas at 82 goals, surpassing the previous record set by Edwin Cubero.

== International career ==
Aceves was first called up to represent Mexico for the 1977 CONCACAF Championship qualification match against Canada on 10 October 1976, coming in a substitute for Alacrán Jiménez with the Tricolor losing 1–0. He saw more consistent appearances in 1977 with his only international goal being scored against Peru that ended in a 2–1 victory on 24 May 1977. His most significant international contribution came during the 1977 CONCACAF Championship as he played in the victories against Guatemala and Canada that helped Mexico return to the 1978 FIFA World Cup after missing the previous edition. In spite of his contributions however, Aceves wouldn't make the final roster and his international career ended that same year.
