= Alfredo Omar Tena =

Mexican footballer (born 1985)

Personal information
- Full name: Alfredo Omar Tena Salamano
- Date of birth: 28 April 1985 (age 41)
- Place of birth: Mexico City, Mexico
- Height: 1.75 m (5 ft 9 in)
- Positions: Midfielder; defender

Team information
- Current team: Querétaro U-21 (Fitness coach)

Senior career*
Years	Team	Apps	(Gls)
2006–2009	América	3	(0)
2009–2011	Querétaro	7	(0)
2011–2012	Como	0	(0)
2013–2014	Zacatepec	6	(0)

Managerial career
- 2017–2018: América Premier (Fitness coach)
- 2018–2019: América Reserves and Academy
- 2019–2020: Querétaro Reserves and Academy
- 2022–2023: Atlético San Luis Reserves and Academy
- 2023–2025: Venados (Fitness coach)
- 2025–: Querétaro Reserves and Academy
- * Club domestic league appearances and goals as of 29 August 2011

Alfredo Omar Tena Salamano (born 28 April 1985, in Mexico City) is a Mexican former footballer who played as a midfielder and defender.

He started his career with Club América in 2005 and made three appearances for them in the Clausura 2008 season. He moved to Querétaro for the Apertura 2009 season and he made 6 appearances for them in his first season. In 2011, Alfredo was transferred to 2nd division Italian Side Como.

== Career ==
Born in Mexico City, Tena began playing football with the youth side of Club América. He retired after the 2014 season, playing for Club América.

Tena is the son of Club América player Alfredo Tena.
