= Raúl Cárdenas =

Mexican footballer and coach (1928–2016)

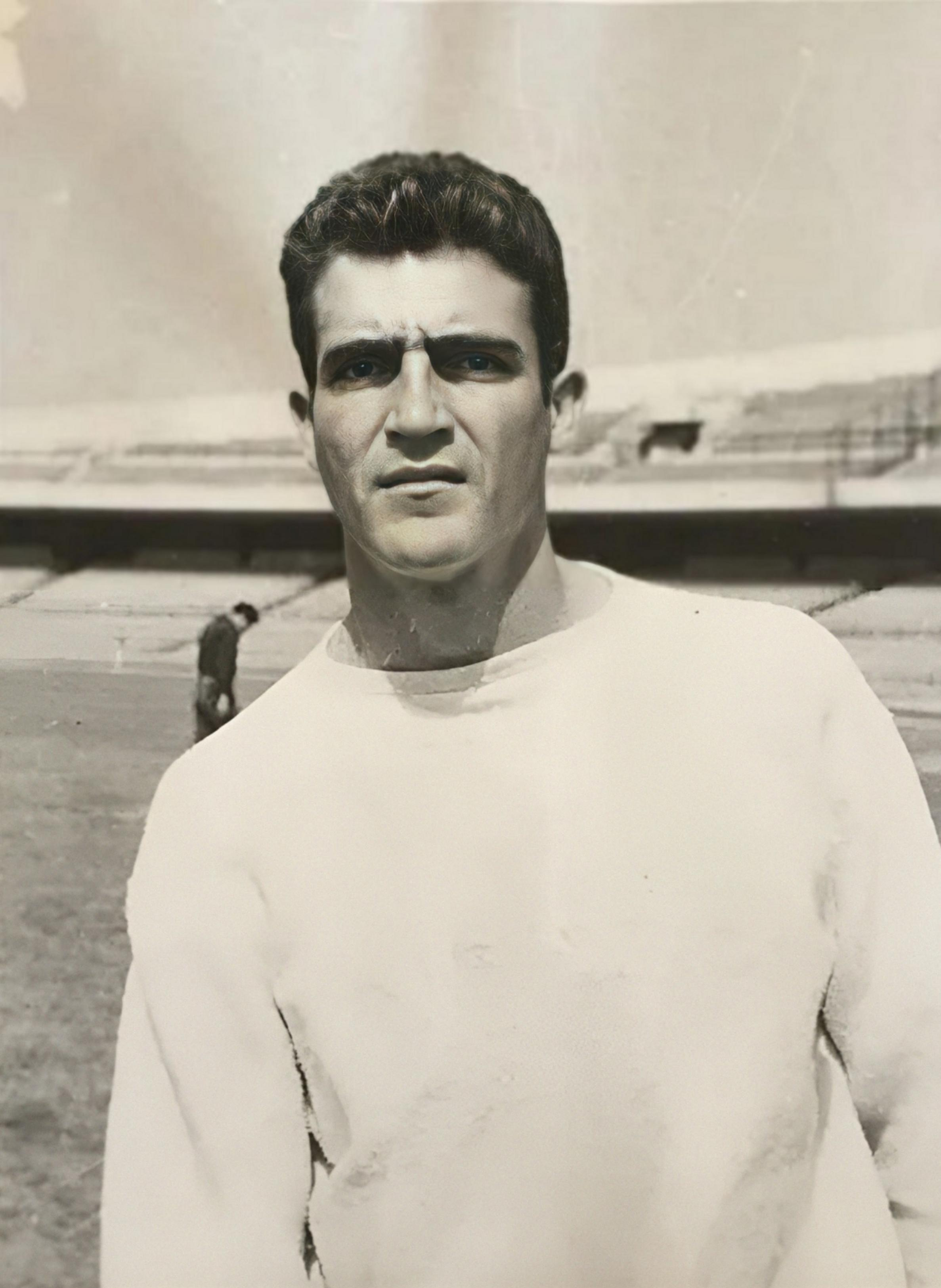
- Cárdenas in 1962

Personal information
- Full name: Raúl Cárdenas de la Vega
- Date of birth: 30 October 1928
- Place of birth: Mexico City, Mexico
- Date of death: 26 March 2016 (aged 87)
- Place of death: Cuernavaca, Mexico
- Height: 1.82 m (6 ft 0 in)
- Position: Centre-back

Senior career*
Years	Team	Apps	(Gls)
1947–1950	Real Club España		
1950–1951	Guadalajara		
1951–1953	Marte		
1953–1954	Puebla		
1954–1965	Zacatepec		

International career
1948–1962	Mexico	37	(3)

Managerial career
- 1966–1975: Cruz Azul
- 1968: Mexico
- 1969: Mexico
- 1970: Mexico
- 1975–1978: América
- 1979–1981: Mexico
- 1988–1991: Toluca
- 1998: Puebla
- * Club domestic league appearances and goals

Raúl Cárdenas de la Vega (30 October 1928 – 26 March 2016) was a Mexican professional footballer and manager. He represented Mexico at the 1948 Olympics.

== Playing career ==
=== Club ===
Born in Mexico City, Cárdenas began playing football with Real Club España, making his Mexican Primera División debut against Asturias F.C. in the 1947–48 season. He would play three seasons with España before the club withdrew from the league. He also competed for Mexico at the 1948 Summer Olympics.

Cárdenas played for Guadalajara, C.D. Marte and Puebla, before joining Zacatepec for 10 seasons. He retired from playing at age 37, becoming a coach for Cruz Azul.

=== International ===
Cárdenas represented the Mexico national team as a player in three FIFA World Cups: 1954, 1958 and 1962 tournaments. He earned a total of 37 caps, scoring 3 goals.

== Managerial career ==
Cárdenas had four separate stints coaching the national team, including in the 1970 FIFA World Cup, held in home soil, where they reached the quarterfinals for the first time in their history. He also managed Cruz Azul towards their first 5 titles in 7 years in 8 finals. He also managed Club América for their 3rd title.

Cárdenas died in Cuernavaca, Morelos, on 25 March 2016, aged 87.

== Honours ==
=== Player ===
Zacatepec

- Mexican Primera División: 1954–55, 1957–58
- Mexican Segunda División: 1962–63
- Copa México: 1956–57, 1958–59
- Campeón de Campeones: 1958

Individual

- IFFHS CONCACAF Men's Team of All Time: 2021

=== Manager ===
Cruz Azul

- Mexican Primera División: 1968–69, México 1970, 1971–72, 1972–73, 1973–74
- Copa México: 1968–69
- Campeón de Campeones: 1969, 1974
- CONCACAF Champions' Cup: 1969, 1970, 1971

América

- Mexican Primera División: 1975–76
- Campeón de Campeones: 1976
- CONCACAF Champions' Cup: 1977
- Copa Interamericana: 1978
