= Osvaldo Castro =

Chilean footballer (born 1947)

Personal information
- Full name: Osvaldo Castro Pelayo
- Date of birth: 14 April 1947 (age 79)
- Place of birth: Copiapó, Chile
- Height: 1.71 m (5 ft 7 in)
- Position: Forward

Senior career*
Years	Team	Apps	(Gls)
1965–1968	Unión La Calera	95	(71)
1969–1971	Deportes Concepción	109	(65)
1972–1975	América	88	(45)
1975–1978	Jalisco	130	(91)
1978	Universidad Católica	5	(0)
1979–1981	Deportivo Neza	85	(45)
1981–1982	Atlético Potosino	36	(24)
1983–1984	Pumas UNAM	53	(9)
Total		601	(350)

International career
1966–1977	Chile	28	(7)

Managerial career
- 1984–: Pumas UNAM (youth)
- * Club domestic league appearances and goals

Osvaldo Castro Pelayo (born 14 April 1947) is a Chilean former professional footballer who played league football for clubs in Chile and Mexico, as well as playing international football for the Chile national team.

== Career ==
Castro started his career Chilean club Unión La Calera in 1965, before joining Deportes Concepción. After three seasons he transferred to Mexican side Club América.

Castro joined Club Jalisco for the 1975–76 season, scoring 26 goals in 32 league appearances. In all he scored 91 league goals for the club in his four seasons with them. Following Jalisco's removal from the Primera División, Castro returned to Chile and joined Universidad Católica for about a month. Next, he joined Deportivo Neza in 1979–80, before moving on to Atlético Potosino for 1981/82. He played his last Mexican seasons with Pumas de la UNAM, finishing with them in 1983/84.

He played for the Chile national team on four occasions during the 1978 FIFA World Cup Qualifiers.

Following his retirement, he has worked as coach for the Pumas UNAM youth ranks.

== Post-retirement ==
Castro made his home in Mexico City, working as a football coach, also founding the Escuela de Fútbol Colo-Colo (Colo-Colo Football Academy), where footballers such as Pablo Barrera and Luis Pérez began their career. In addition, Castro worked for the American football team Los Angeles Rams, helping players to develop strong shoots.

== Personal life ==
His nickname was Pata Bendita (Blessed Foot) since he was a young player, due to his strong shoots.

== Honours ==
Deportes Concepción

- Torneo Provincial de Chile: 1970
- Copa Francisco Candelori: 1970

América

- Copa México: 1973–74

Chile

- Copa del Pacífico: 1971

Individual

- Primera División de Chile Top Goalscorer: 1970
- Chilean Footballer of the Year: 1970
- Primera División de México Top Goalscorer: 1973–74
- Copa México Top Goalscorer: 1973–74
- Soccer Hall of Fame: 2025
