= Héctor Brambila =

Mexican footballer (born 1947)

Personal information
- Full name: Héctor Brambila Quintero
- Date of birth: 8 July 1950 (age 76)
- Place of birth: Guadalajara, Jalisco, Mexico
- Position: Goalkeeper

Youth career
- ???–1965: Atlas

Senior career*
Years	Team	Apps	(Gls)
1969–1977	Atlas		
1977–1984	León		
1984–1989	Leones Negros UdeG		

International career
1971–1973	Mexico	5	(0)
Medal record
Men's football
Representing Mexico
CONCACAF Championship
Bronze medal – third place	1973 Haiti	Team
- * Club domestic league appearances and goals

Héctor Brambila Quintero (born 8 July 1950) is a retired Mexican footballer. He played as a goalkeeper for Atlas, León and Leones Negros UdeG throughout the 1970s and the 1980s. He also represented Mexico for the 1973 CONCACAF Championship.

== Club career ==
Born in Guadalajara, Brambila quickly caught the attention of Atlas manager Alfredo Torres who signed him for the 1969–70 season, playing as the reserve goalkeeper for Javier Vargas. He made his debut in a 2–1 victory over Toluca, quickly becoming a popular player within the Rojinegros. Following the club's relegation in the 1970–71 season, Brambila was made the main goalkeeper for the 1971–72 Mexican Segunda División where the club immediately returned to the top-flight of Mexican football. Throughout his era, he played alongside Bernardino García, Abel Verónico, Pepe Delgado, Ricardo Chavarín, Magdaleno Mercado and José de Jesús Aceves. One of Brambila's greatest achievements occurred on 13 January 1971 where he would significantly contribute towards Atlas's victory over Bayern Munich on 13 January 1971 where after the match went into a penalty shoot-out with the score ending 9–5 in penalties, making Atlas one of the very few clubs to against Die Bayern. He then switched to play for León for their 1977–78 season until switching to Leones Negros UdeG for their 1984–85 season where he remained until his retirement following the 1988–89 season.

== International career ==
Brambila made his debut on 16 August 1971 in a friendly against East Germany which ended in a 0–1 loss. His biggest contribution came during the 1973 CONCACAF Championship where his final appearance was in the critical loss against Trinidad and Tobago which ended 4–0, causing Mexico to fail to qualify for the 1974 FIFA World Cup.
