= Daniel Pavón =

Spanish diver

Personal information
- Nationality: Spanish
- Born: 26 August 1972 (age 52); Cobeja, Spain

Sport
- Sport: Diving

Daniel Pavón (born 26 August 1972) is a Spanish diver. He competed in the men's 10 metre platform event at the 1996 Summer Olympics.
