= Jesús Martínez (footballer, born 1952) =

Mexican footballer (born 1952)

Personal information
- Full name: Jesús Martínez Díez
- Date of birth: 7 June 1952 (age 74)
- Place of birth: Mexico
- Position: Defender

Senior career*
Years	Team	Apps	(Gls)
1975–1976	San Isidro Laguna	33	(0)
1976–1980	Club América	87	(2)
Total		120	(2)

International career
1978	Mexico	2	(0)
- * Club domestic league appearances and goals

Jesús Martínez Díez (born 7 June 1952) is a Mexican former football defender who played for Mexico in the 1978 FIFA World Cup. He also played for Club América.
