= Seberi =

Municipality in Rio Grande do Sul, Brazil

Coordinates: 27°29′S 53°24′W

- Municipality
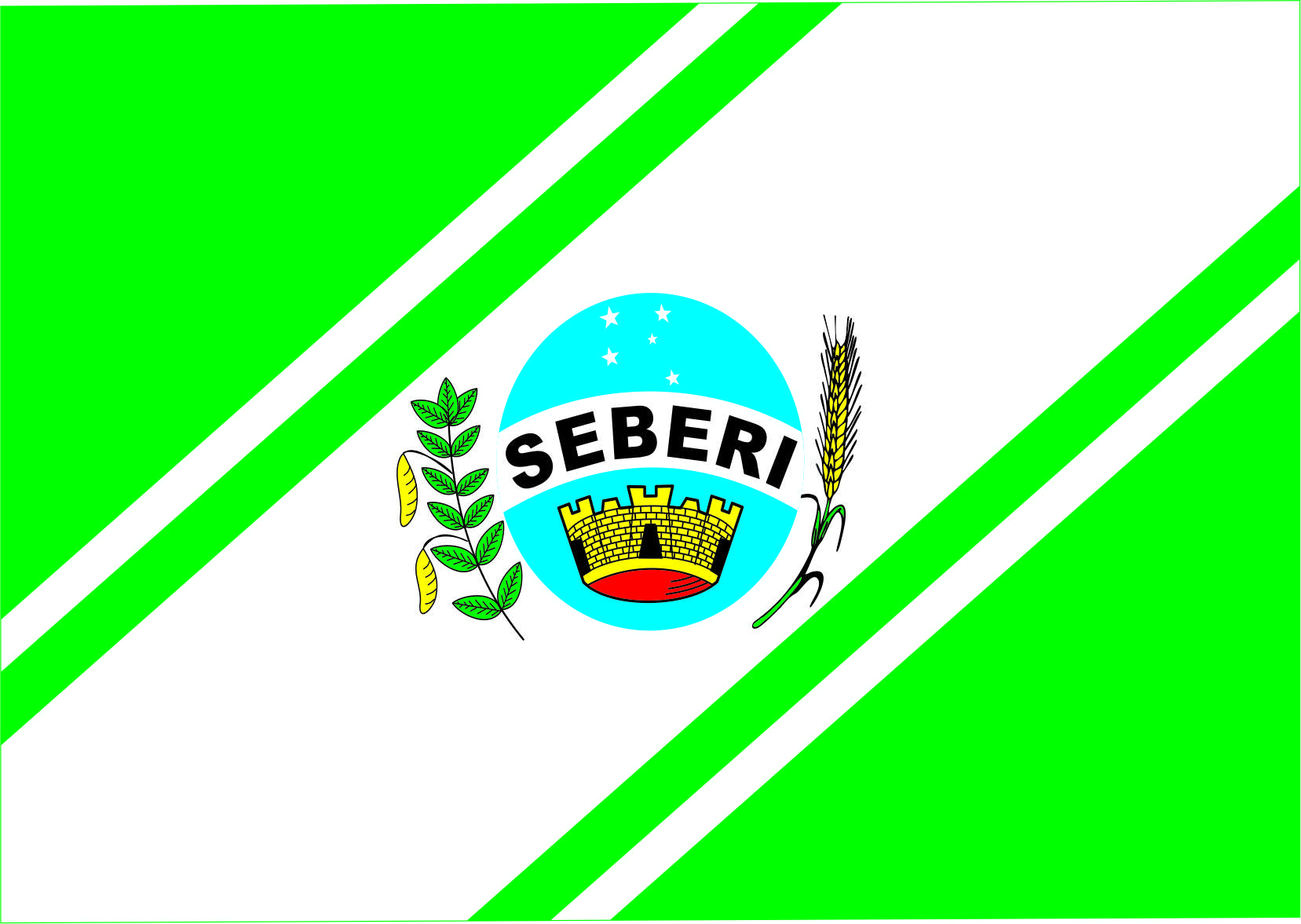
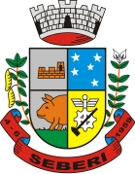
- Flag Coat of arms
- Interactive map of Seberi
- Country: Brazil
- Time zone: UTC−3 (BRT)

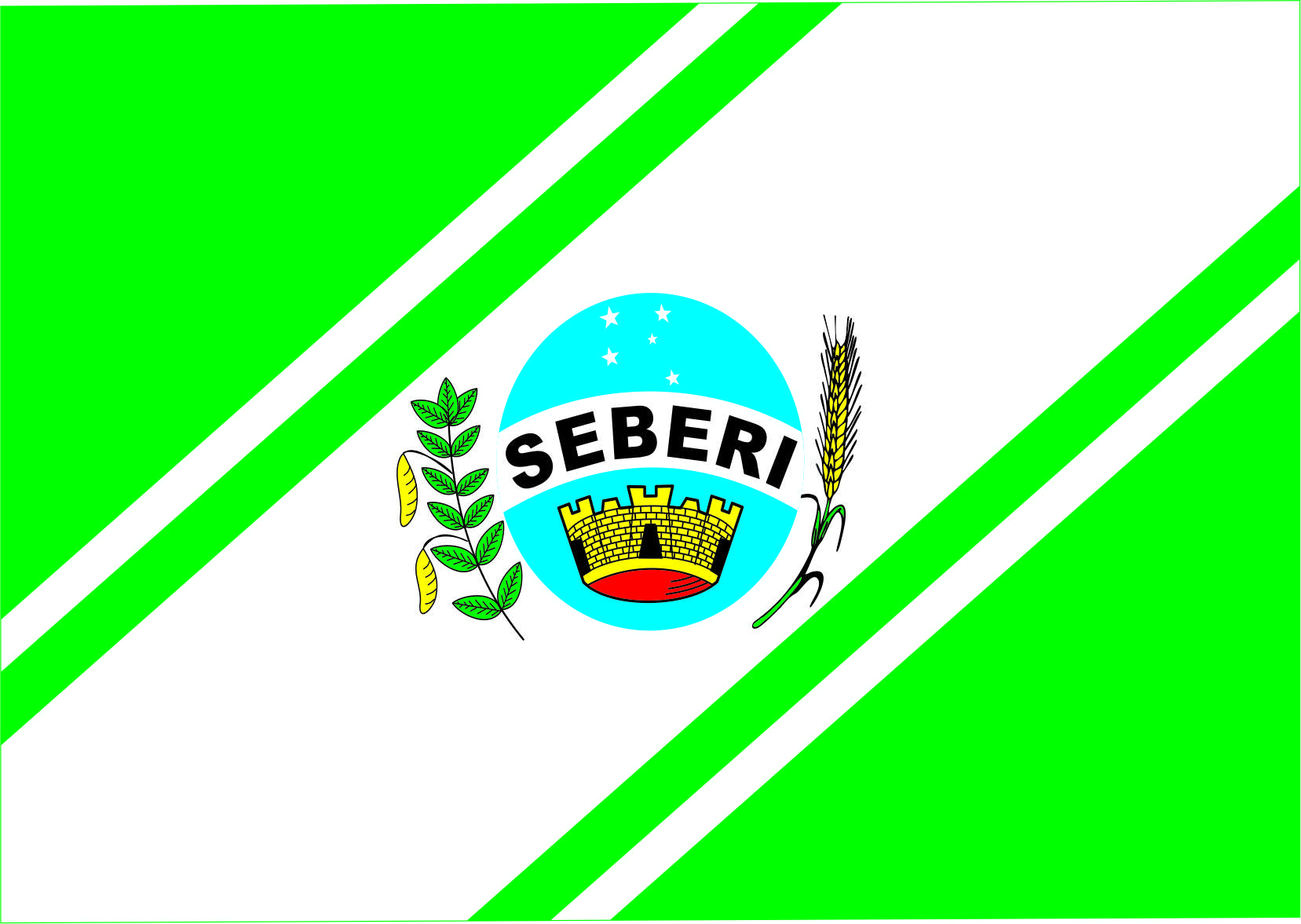

Seberi is a municipality in the state of Rio Grande do Sul, Brazil. As of 2020, the estimated population was 10,713.

== See also ==
- List of municipalities in Rio Grande do Sul
