= Alcindo =

Brazilian footballer (1945–2016)

Personal information
- Full name: Alcindo Martha de Freitas
- Date of birth: 31 March 1945
- Place of birth: Sapucaia do Sul, Brazil
- Date of death: 27 August 2016 (aged 71)
- Place of death: Porto Alegre, Brazil
- Position: Midfielder

Senior career*
Years	Team	Apps	(Gls)
1963	Rio Grande		
1964–1971	Grêmio		
1971–1973	Santos	22	(5)
1973–1975	Jalisco		
1975–1976	América	38	(21)
1977–1978	Gremio		
1978	Francana		

International career
1966–1967	Brazil	7	(1)
- * Club domestic league appearances and goals

Alcindo Martha de Freitas (31 March 1945 – 27 August 2016), known simply as Alcindo, was a Brazilian footballer who played as a midfielder.

== Career ==
During his club career he played for Rio Grande (1963), Grêmio (1964–1971), Santos (1971–1973), Club Jalisco (1973-1975) and Club América (1975–76) of Mexico, and Francana (1978). Alcindo is Grêmio's all-time leading scorer with 636 career goals for the club.

He was part of the Brazilian team for the 1966 FIFA World Cup. In total he earned 7 caps and scored 1 goal for Brazil. His brother Alfeu played for San Lorenzo de Almagro, in Argentina. He died from complications of diabetes on 27 August 2016.

== Honours ==
Grêmio

- Campeonato Gaúcho: 1964, 1965, 1966, 1967, 1968, 1977

Santos

- Campeonato Paulista: 1973

América

- Liga MX: 1975-76
