= Miguel Bordón =

Argentine footballer

Miguel Ángel Bordón
Personal information
- Date of birth: 27 October 1952
- Place of birth: Rosario
- Date of death: 16 June 2003 (aged 50)
- Place of death: Dolores, Buenos Aires

International career
Years	Team	Apps	(Gls)
1979	Argentina	4	(0)

Miguel Ángel Bordón (Rosario, 27 October 1952 – Dolores, Buenos Aires, 16 June 2003) was an Argentine footballer. He played in four matches for the Argentina national football team in 1979. He was also part of Argentina's squad for the 1979 Copa América tournament.

== Honours ==
Boca Juniors

- Intercontinental Cup: 1977
- Copa Libertadores: 1978
