= Euzébio =

Brazilian footballer (1951-2010)

Personal information
- Full name: Carlos de Jesus Euzébio
- Date of birth: 16 November 1951
- Place of birth: Santa Bárbara d'Oeste, Brazil
- Date of death: 11 March 2010 (aged 58)
- Place of death: Santa Bárbara d'Oeste, Brazil
- Height: 1.88 m (6 ft 2 in)
- Position: Striker

Senior career*
Years	Team	Apps	(Gls)
–	União Barbarense		
–	Vasco da Gama de Americana (SP)		
1972–1974	Santos		
1974–1982	Leones Negros		
1982–1983	Monterrey	20	(0)
1983–1985	León	69	(7)
1985–1986	União Barbarense		
- * Club domestic league appearances and goals

Carlos de Jesus Euzébio, known as Euzébio, (16 November 1951 – 11 March 2010) was a Brazilian football striker.

== Career ==
Born in Santa Bárbara d'Oeste, Euzébio began playing football with hometown União Agrícola Barbarense Futebol Clube. He played one season with now-defunct Esporte Clube Vasco da Gama in Americana, São Paulo before joining Santos Futebol Clube in 1972. He won the Campeonato Paulista with Santos in 1973.

Euzébio moved to Mexico in 1974, joining newly promoted Leones Negros. He would spend 10 years playing in the Mexican Primera División with Leones Negros, CF Monterrey and Club León. In 1985, he returned to Brazil where he finished his career with União Barbarense.

== Personal ==
Euzébio died in an automobile accident in his hometown of Santa Bárbara d'Oeste at age 58.
