= Antonio de la Torre (footballer, born 1951) =

Mexican footballer (1951–2021)

Personal information
- Full name: Antonio de la Torre Villalpando
- Date of birth: 21 September 1951
- Place of birth: Mexico City, Mexico
- Date of death: 1 August 2021 (aged 69)
- Position: Defender

Senior career*
Years	Team	Apps	(Gls)
1971–1974	Pumas UNAM		(?)
1974–1982	América	197	(20)
1981	→ Los Angeles Aztecs (loan)	14	(1)
1982–1984	Puebla	68	(5)
1984–1988	Atlas	94	(2)

International career
1972–1978	Mexico	44	(1)
- * Club domestic league appearances and goals

Antonio de la Torre Villalpando (21 September 1951 – 2 August 2021) was a Mexican professional footballer who played as a defender, spending most of his career with Club América.

== Career ==
De la Torre helped Club América win the 1975–76 Primera División de México Cup along with 1978 CONCACAF Champions' Cup and the Copa Interamericana that same year. He was also part of the 1978 FIFA World Cup in Argentina. He played for America for five years before joining Puebla F.C. where he won the 1982–83 Primera División Mexicana. After two years with Puebla he decided to retire.

== Personal life ==
He was the father of Antonio de la Torre García.

He died on 2 August 2021, aged 69.

== Honours ==
América

- Primera División Mexicana: 1975–76
- Copa Interamericana: 1977

Puebla

- Primera División Mexicana: 1982–83
