= Tecos F.C. =

Association football club in Mexico

Tecos
- Full name: Tecos Fútbol Club
- Nicknames: Tecos; Los Tecolotes (The Owls); Los Estudiantes (The Students); La Autónoma (The Autonomous); Los Emplumados (The Feathered); El Tecolote (The Owl)
- Short name: UAG, TEC
- Founded: 5 July 1971; 55 years ago (as Club de Fútbol Universidad Autónoma de Guadalajara); 7 August 2015; 11 years ago (refounded as Tecos Fútbol Club)
- Ground: Cancha Anexa Tres de Marzo; Zapopan, Jalisco
- Capacity: 1,000
- Owner: Antonio Leaño
- Chairman: Juan Carlos Leaño
- Manager: Vacant
- League: Liga Premier (Serie A)
- 2025–26: Regular phase: 5th (Group I); Final phase: Reclassification
- Website: www.tecos.mx
| Home colours | Away colours |

Tecos Fútbol Club, simplified as Tecos FC, is a Mexican professional football club based in Zapopan, Jalisco. It competes in Liga Premier - Serie A, the third level division of Mexican football, and plays its home matches at the Tres de Marzo attached field. Founded in 1971 as Club de Fútbol Universidad Autónoma de Guadalajara and commonly known as Tecos UAG, the club represents the Universidad Autónoma de Guadalajara, it changed its name to Club Deportivo Estudiantes Tecos in 2009. After the franchise was moved to Zacatecas and renamed Mineros de Zacatecas in 2014, the club was later revived in 2015 and rebranded under its current name.

Domestically, Tecos FC has won one Primera División title. Internationally, the club has won one CONCACAF Cup Winners Cup. It is the only club in Mexican football history to ascend from the two lower divisions and get the Primera División title.

== History ==
The university was founded in 1935 and soon had a team to play amateur football until 1971 when they joined Federación Mexicana de Fútbol. They gained promotion to Liga de Ascenso in their second season after beating La Piedad 4–0 under the management of Guillermo Sepulveda; and two years later in the 1974–75 season, they were promoted to Primera División Mexicana by beating Irapuato in a promotion game under the management of Everardo Villaseñor.

=== First Years in the First Division ===
The club played its first Primera División Mexicana match on September 3, 1975 against Puebla F.C., a match which the club went on to lose 2–3. The club's first win was played against Atleticos Campesinos, with the match being played in the Jalisco Stadium. That year the club finished in second place and qualifying to its first liguilla playoff stage. In quarterfinals the club went up against Club América who eliminated the newly promoted club. The following year, the club finished 4th overall and once again qualified to the liguilla, but is once again, knocked out in quarterfinals, this time by Tigres de la UANL.

In the 1979-80 tournament the clubs invited to play a friendly tournament in Spain the Torneo Sol de Valencia which the club manages to win. The story being the complete opposite in their domestic league, where the club failed to qualify to the liguilla.

In the 1980–81 season, Tecos UAG achieved 20 games without losing and ended in the first position of the table creating a national record, but they were unable to get to the finals in the post-season round robin elimination.

In the 1986–87 season, Tecos UAG was shown as one of the biggest contenders of the tournament. Jose Luis Zalazar achieved the Goal Scoring Championship by making 21 goals, most of them from penalty kicks. They reached the quarterfinals against Cruz Azul and they lost in the penalty shootout where Zalazar failed to score one of the shoots deciding the fate of the game.

=== 1993-94 Championship ===
After some seasons where they faced bad seasons and others where they could not pass the quarterfinals in the Liguilla, the club hired manager Víctor Manuel Vucetich, known at the time for promoting clubs Potros Neza and León. Vucetich had also managed the last team to win the league title years before. The squad was formed by players like Carlos Briones, Jorge Gabrich, Porfirio Jiménez, Osmar Donizette, Marcelo Gonçalvez and others. During the first part of the season they fought the top of the table with CD Guadalajara and at the end of the first part of the season, Guadalajara got the first place, but a consistent second part of the season, combined with a record input by goalkeeper Alan Cruz of having more time with his goal undefeated, made the Tecos reach the top of the table, beating CD Guadalajara in the last game and making them play the Repechaje against Atlético Morelia. At the end of the regular tournament Tecos made 51 points, scored 49 goals and only received 26 to be the best defense of the season.

In the Quarterfinals, Tecos beat a weak Atlético Morelia, scoring 3–0 in both games. In the semifinals, they met América. Tecos got the first win of 3–2 in the Azteca Stadium; in a dramatic game, América beat Tecos in the Estadio Tres de Marzo 2–1, but the goal from Edson Zwarich put the tie in the global score and Tecos was able to pass the finals in the top position.

The final was against Santos Laguna, another team that, after surviving relegation several seasons, got reinforced with good players and achieved its first final game. The first game, played on April 27, 1994 was a very rough game that ended 1-0 for Santos in the Corona Stadium in Torreón, that goal was a penalty shot scored by Daniel Guzmán.

The second and final game was played on April 30, 1994, in the Tres de Marzo Stadium. The game was also noted for its aggressiveness, but Tecos was able to beat Santos 1–0 in the normal time due to an own goal by Jesús Gómez, making the global score to tie and forcing the game to overtime, during which Osmar Donizette make a wild run with the ball over Santos defense and scored a goal to break the tie and give Tecos UAG the title.

=== Irregular years (1994-2005) ===
After getting the championship Tecos tried to keep most of the players that helped to get the championship, unfortunately some of them, like Jorge Gabrich and Porfirio Jimenez retired, others were transferred to other teams like Javier Hernandez Gutierrez and others began to lose the quality shown on the previous season like Osmar Donizzette and Edson Zwarich. Finally, Victor Manuel Vucetich resigned his position and this was taken by Luis Fernando Tena.

And with this began a long story of irregular seasons were Tecos UAG barely got qualification. In 1997, the offensive line reinforced with Serbian Zdenko Muf and, later in 1999 with Sebastian Abreu, an Uruguayan player that got himself the last best scorer award for a player from Tecos, and Adolfo Bautista. With these three players Tecos tried to go back to the first places but in 1998 they were eliminated in quarterfinals by Atlas (Verano 98) and Necaxa (Invierno 98). In Invierno 99 they lost again the quarterfinals again against Atlas.

After Invierno 99, the team began to lose positions and the percentage of points in three tournaments began to drop. Tecos survived relegation in 2003. After the Clausura tournament, they scored 7 points by winning one game and losing 14, but Colibríes de Cuernavaca (formerly Atlético Celaya) was relegated instead.

In 1999, Juan Carlos Leaño, the son the team's owner, debuted as a defender in the club's first team.

In Apertura 2002, Tecos managed to get on the second place of group 2, but was easily eliminated by Monarcas 7–2 in quarterfinals round. Their top scorer was Reinaldo Navia with 9 goals. This tournament helped Tecos to survive the Clausura 2003 session when they scored 7 points and finished at the bottom of the table.

In Apertura 2003, Tecos acquired Eliomar Marcon who scored 10 goals in that season, helping the team to reach the repechaje round in that tournament, only to be defeated there by Cruz Azul. The next season, Tecos only made 18 points and was on the last positions of the table, the next season, the relegation was beginning to feel close when they shared the last place of the tournament with Cruz Azul and Dorados with 16 points.

=== Clausura 2005 ===
For Clausura 2005 tournament, Tecos formed another good squad with Daniel Guzman as the trainer, and reinforced the squad with players with Daniel Ludueña and Juan Pablo Rodriguez.

This season was one of the best for Tecos in terms of goal effectiveness, as long as Ludueña and Eliomar Marcon were able to reach the top 10 scorers table. Tecos was able to reach the fourth position in the table and, even though they were third in their group, they qualified for the Liguilla.

In the quarterfinals they beat Necaxa in two games 4–1. In the semifinals they confronted the top team of the tournament, Monarcas Morelia, in the first game in Zapopan. Tecos won the game 1-0 and then were able to retain their advantage by getting a tie 1–1 in the Morelos Stadium, eliminating the leader.

In the finals against América, Tecos were close to get a big advantage in Zapopan, but in the last minutes a penalty allowed América to get the tie 1-1. Finally, Tecos lost in the Azteca Stadium, 6–3.

For Apertura 2005, Tecos lost some of their score power, but managed to get again to the Liguilla where they were eliminated by Monterrey in the quarterfinal round. In Clausura 2006, Tecos made 21 points that were not enough to reach the Liguilla.

After Daniel Ludueña was transferred to Santos, Tecos lost its score power and, even with the help of Hugo Droguett they began to drown in the position table in the 2007–2008 season.

=== 2009 renovation project ===
In 2009 a renovation plan was released, where a name and logo change for the club were proposed. This plan was supported by Mexican chairman José Antonio Leaño and family (the club owners), and Juan José Frangie, chairman, who previously worked with C.D. Guadalajara. On May 25, 2009 the project was officially released. The first change was the name; C.F. U.A.G. (Universidad Autónoma de Guadalajara) turned into C.F. Estudiantes, The reason as to the name change was as to update the club's image, resulting in an aesthetic make-over to reference South American team monikers. The new colors are now wine and yellow, formerly a white and red theme. The new uniform and project have been in use since Clausura 2009.

After the rename and also a relocation of their time schedule allowing them to play on Friday nights (in order to attract more people from Guadalajara to see their games), Estudiantes had a good season in the Apertura 2009 enough to pull them in the InterLiga, where they were able to get the pass to the 2010 Copa Libertadores, but they were unable to pass the qualification round after being beaten by Juan Aurich team 4–1.

=== Relegation ===
The 2010–2011 seasons shown very poor results for Estudiantes and began in the third worst place of the relegation percentage table just behind Atlas and recently ascended Tijuana. The Apertura 2011 was hard for the three teams and Estudiantes retained its position at the end of that tournament, but a renovation in Tijuana squad and Atlas solid defense during the Clausura 2012 pulled Estudiantes to the last position. Estudiantes lost its position in Mexico's Primera División when Atlas defeated Monterrey 1–0 in Jalisco Stadium, while Tecos draw 1–1 to Puebla in Tres de Marzo stadium, pulling a disadvantage of 7 points with only 2 games (6 points) to play. Last game of Tecos on Primera División was against Querétaro that ended in a draw 1-1.

=== Sale of Equipment ===
The Autonomous University of Guadalajara confirmed the sale of Estudiantes Tecos to Grupo Pachuca; Further, it was clarified that the school would still take the student club for Clausura 2013.

"Grupo Pachuca will take operation in May 2013 The Autonomous University of Guadalajara wishes the best of luck to Grupo Pachuca and hopes that this new phase of the team is full of victories and championships", was announced.

=== Disappearance of Team ===
On May 22, 2014, the president of Grupo Pachuca, Jesús Martínez Patiño announced that the Club Deportivo Estudiantes Tecos would be moved from Zapopan, Jalisco to Zacatecas, Zacatecas; this happened because there was an agreement with the Zacatecas government to send a professional football team to the state.

By not being able to get Tecos back to Liga Bancomer MX, on May 28, 2014, the change of venue and name was confirmed, giving birth to a new team, Mineros de Zacatecas.

The reserve team that played in Segunda División de Mexico stayed in Zapopan, Jalisco for a little while. In July, it was made official that Estudiantes Tecos would play for the 2014–15 Season in Liga Premier de Ascenso in Group 1 using the badge and uniform of the former Estudiantes Tecos CF.

After the 2014–15 Season, the reserved team of Estudiantes Tecos was also moved to Zacatecas and dissolved, too.

=== Re-founding (New Era) ===
In August 2015, the Leaño family announced they had bought the image rights from Grupo Pachuca, thus, re-founding the club to play in the Tercera División, the fourth tier of Mexican football. The previous owner, Antonio Leaño and his son Juan Carlos Leaño, estimate that the club's goal is to reach the Ascenso MX and/or the 1st Division within 5–6 years.

In the 2016–17 season, under the leadership of Rodrigo 'El Pony' Ruiz, the team managed to promote to the Segunda División after reaching the final by defeating Tuzos Pachuca in the semi-finals 4–2. In the final, Tecos faced Sporting Canamy, tying 2-2 after 120 minutes of playing. In the penalty shootout, however, Sporting Canamy would be crowned champion.

Subsequently, Tecos requested the annulment of the result of the final arguing the use of players over the age limit allowed by the regulation, known in Mexico as (Cachirules). On June 19, 2017, the disciplinary commission accepted the request of Tecos to find evidence of alteration of the birth certificate of a Canamy player, in this way Tecos was proclaimed champion of the Third Division, achieving his promotion to the Second Division Serie A.

After the team's promotion to the Liga Premier, Tecos had unremarkable performances in the league, reaching the playoffs only a few times. Consequently, the club's management began investing in other sports, seeking ways to cut costs and explore alternative revenue streams, due to the team's meager profits resulting from a lack of opportunities to advance to higher divisions. Therefore, in November 2025, UAG granted the concert promoter OCESA the use of the Estadio Tres de Marzo for a period of 10 years, in exchange for a reconstruction of the venue, which left the Tecos without a stadium suitable for professional football, since the new use of the stadium will be concerts.

On June 3, 2026, the Tecos board announced the hiatus of the club's first team, thus abandoning professional football due to the lack of a suitable stadium and a restructuring of the club to seek promotion when it is definitively reinstated in all Mexican leagues. However, the club maintained activity through its youth squad participating in the Liga TDP, the fourth category of Mexican football, in addition to the football training centers maintained by Tecos and the university.

== The Tecos name ==
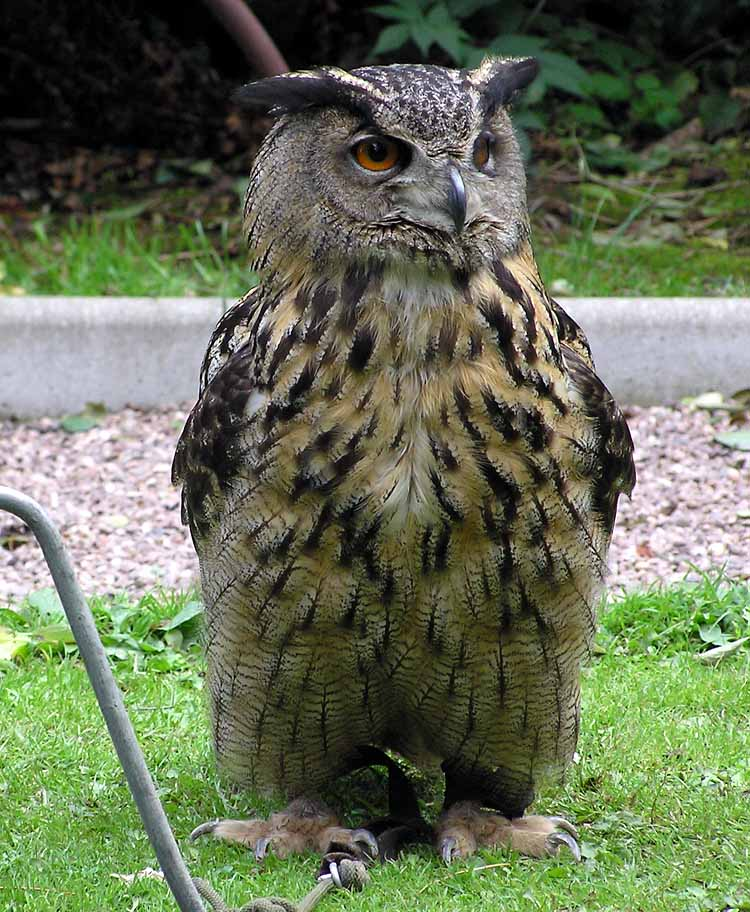
Tecolote (Owl in Mexican Spanish)

Originally Estudiantes Tecos was commonly called Tecos U.A.G., since the name Tecos has a double meaning for U.A.G. students, as it is a short way for saying "Tecolote" (some types of owl in Mexico), as well as an acronym for "Tarea Educativa y Cultural hacia el Orden y la Sintesis" (Educative and Cultural Work for the Order and the Synthesis), a group formed by students and academics of the university.

Club de Fútbol Universidad Autónoma de Guadalajara: (1971-2009) Official name of the football club affiliated with the Universidad Autónoma de Guadalajara, commonly known as Tecos UAG.

Club Deportivo Estudiantes Tecos: (2009-2015) Name assumed after the acquisition of the club by Grupo Pachuca.

Tecos Fútbol Club: (2015-) Name assumed after the re-foundation of the club following the sale of sporting rights to Zacatecas.

== Low position in Guadalajara football history ==
When Tecos UAG ascended to the First Division, Guadalajara was unexpectedly saturated with football teams with five teams playing in the First Division (Guadalajara, Atlas, Tecos, Universidad de Guadalajara and Jalisco). This number was eventually reduced to three due to the relegation of Jalisco and Atlas for one season.

Initially Tecos biggest rival was the Universidad de Guadalajara. This rivalry was based on the fact that both teams represent universities in the same city, with U.A.G. being a private university and U. de G. a public university. The U. de G. team was more popular than Tecos and also sometimes more successful by reaching the finals more times than U.A.G. and even winning a Mexico Cup. Unfortunately, the U. de G. never won a regular season while Tecos did. Tragically, the U. de G. lost their franchise due to economic issues that lead to the team being sold to FEMEXFUT in 1994.

Tecos tried to maintain the popularity it received after their championship but bad campaigns, combined with the success of Chivas in 1997 and the popularity boost that Atlas got at the end of the nineties resulted in Tecos keeping a low profile compared to the other teams in the city.

In the last years of Tecos' stay in the Primera, the team tried to create a rivalry with both Atlas and Guadalajara, but it never was taken seriously due to Tecos' lack of fan support. Unofficially, the rivalry with Atlas was called "El clasico de la avenida Patria" (Patria avenue derby) and "El clasico de Zapopan" (The Zapopan Derby) due to both teams having their clubs located on the same avenue in Zapopan.

In the history of the team, Tecos distinguished itself from other teams as it was the only team in the League that did not have a barra brava and instead a student supporters squad, called "Los Reprovados" (The Undergraduates). In the first years of the club, U.A.G. students were allowed to enter the stadium to see most games for free. However, the cheerleading squad was distinguished to keep standing and making noise all the time they were in the stadium unaware of the results and by respecting fellow animation squads.

== Kit evolution ==
- Home kit: Burgundy shirt with a yellow transparent slash going from the right shoulder to the left waist, with burgundy shorts and socks.
- Away kit: White shirt with a golden slash going from the right shoulder to the left waist, with white shorts and socks.

First kit evolution

| 1971 | 1977 | 1980 | 1987 | 1990 | 1991–92 | 1994 | 1995 | 2006 |

=== Checker patterns ===
First kit evolution

| 1994 | 1997 | 1998 | 2001 | 2004 | 2006 | 2007 | 2008 |

=== University colors 2009–2014 ===
First kit evolution

| 2010 | 2011 |

== Stadium ==
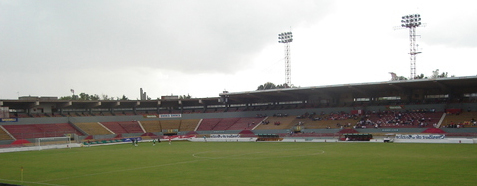
Estadio 3 de Marzo

They play their home games at the Estadio Tres de Marzo which is located in Zapopan, Jalisco. It has a capacity of 30,015 and was constructed in 1971. Its most recent renovation was in 1999.

== Goal Scoring Records ==
All time Goal Leaders

| Position | Player | Goals |
|---|---|---|
| *1 | (Paraguay) Hugo Enrique Kiesse | 115 |
| *2 | (Mexico) Eustacio Rizo | 51 |
| *3 | (Serbia) Zdenko Muf | 42 |
| *4 | (Brazil) Osmar Donizete | 42 |
| *5 | (Brazil) Eliomar Marcón | 40 |
| *6 | (Chile) Miguel Ángel Gamboa | 40 |
| *7 | (Mexico) Javier Hernández | 40 |
| *8 | (Mexico) Enrique Villalba | 36 |
| *9 | (Uruguay) Sebastián Abreu | 34 |
| *10 | (Brazil) Edmur Lucas | 34 |

Goal Scoring Champions

| Position | Player | Goals | Year |
|---|---|---|---|
| *1 | José Zalazar | 27 | 1986-87 |
| *2 | Sebastián Abreu | 14 | Winter 2000 |

== Players ==
=== Current roster ===
As of January 10, 2026

Note: Flags indicate national team as defined under FIFA eligibility rules; some limited exceptions apply. Players may hold more than one non-FIFA nationality.

| No. | Pos. | Nation | Player |
|---|---|---|---|
| 1 | GK | MEX | José Pintado |
| 2 | DF | MEX | Sebastián Medina |
| 3 | DF | MEX | Ángel García |
| 4 | MF | MEX | César López |
| 6 | MF | MEX | Brandon Fonseca |
| 7 | FW | MEX | Christian Sánchez |
| 8 | MF | MEX | Francisco Lugo |
| 9 | FW | MEX | Éver Corona |
| 10 | MF | MEX | José Casillas |
| 11 | FW | MEX | Kevin Hernández |
| 12 | MF | MEX | Kevin Esquivel |
| 13 | GK | MEX | Joel Santana |
| 16 | FW | MEX | Francisco Romero |
| 17 | FW | MEX | Adrián Canales |

| No. | Pos. | Nation | Player |
|---|---|---|---|
| 18 | DF | MEX | Diego Trujillo |
| 19 | FW | MEX | Gerardo Padilla |
| 20 | MF | MEX | Guillermo Gallardo |
| 21 | MF | MEX | David Reyes |
| 22 | DF | MEX | Néstor Arriaga |
| 23 | DF | MEX | Diego Romero |
| 24 | DF | MEX | Marlon Sayas |
| 25 | FW | MEX | David Negrete |
| 31 | GK | MEX | Alejandro Guzmán |
| 32 | FW | MEX | Iván Ramírez |
| 34 | DF | MEX | Óscar Martínez |
| 36 | GK | MEX | Juan Pablo Ledesma |
| 38 | MF | MEX | Mauricio Pérez |
| 50 | MF | MEX | Santiago Medina |

=== Reserve teams ===
Tecos F.C. (Liga TDP)
Reserve team that plays in the Liga TDP, the fourth level of the Mexican league system.

=== Notable former players ===
- (Mexico) Francisco Guareño Robles
- (Argentina) Mauro Cejas
- (Argentina) Diego Colotto
- (Argentina) (Mexico) Daniel Ludueña
- (Argentina) Emanuel Villa
- (Brazil) Antônio Carlos Santos
- (Brazil) Eliomar Marcón
- (Brazil) Gonçalves
- (Brazil) Osmar Donizete
- (Cameroon) David Embé
- (Chile) Hugo Droguett
- (Chile) Miguel Ángel Gamboa
- (Chile) Sebastián González
- (Chile) Reinaldo Navia
- (Chile) Nelson Pinto
- (Chile) (Mexico) Rodrigo Ruiz
- (Costa Rica) Reynaldo Parks
- (Costa Rica) Jafet Soto
- (Ecuador) Nicolas Asencio
- (Guatemala) Byron Pérez
- (Honduras) Danilo Turcios
- (Kenya) Mathayo Huma
- (Mexico) Adolfo Bautista
- (Mexico) Alfredo Tena
- (Mexico) Duilio Davino
- (Mexico) Flavio Davino
- (Mexico) José de Jesús Corona
- (Mexico) Cristo Fernández
- (Mexico) Javier Hernández Gutiérrez
- (Mexico) Juan Carlos Leaño
- (Mexico) Rafael Medina
- (Mexico) Jaime Ordiales
- (Mexico) Pável Pardo
- (Mexico) Arnhold Rivas
- (Mexico) José Luis Salgado
- (Mexico) Joel Sánchez
- (Mexico) Juan Carlos Valenzuela
- (Mexico) Taufic Guarch
- (Mexico) Eduardo Lillingston
- (Mexico) Said Godínez
- (Paraguay) Freddy Bareiro
- (Paraguay) Diego Gavilán
- (Paraguay) (Mexico) Hugo Kiesse
- (Peru) Roberto Palacios
- (Peru) Franco Navarro
- (Peru) Julio César Uribe
- (Serbia) Zdenko Muf
- (United States) (Mexico) Sammy Ochoa
- (United States) Herculez Gomez
- (Uruguay) Sebastián Abreu
- (Uruguay) Antonio Alzamendi
- (Uruguay) Juan Ramón Carrasco
- (Uruguay) Rubén da Silva
- (Uruguay) Marcelo Sosa
- (Uruguay) José Luis Zalazar
- (Uruguay) Eduardo Acevedo

== Honours ==
=== Domestic ===
| Type | Competition | Titles | Winning years | Runners-up |
|---|---|---|---|---|
| Top division | Primera División | 1 | 1993–94 | Clausura 2005 |
| Promotion divisions | Ascenso MX | 1 | Clausura 2014 | – |
| Promotion divisions | Campeón de Ascenso | 0 | – | 2014 |
| Promotion divisions | Segunda División | 1 | 1974–75 | – |
| Promotion divisions | Copa México de la Segunda División | 1 | Clausura 2015 | – |
| Promotion divisions | Tercera División | 2^{s} | 1972–73, 2016–17 | – |
| Promotion divisions | Campeón de Campeones de la Tercera División | 1^{s} | 1973 | – |

=== International ===
| Type | Competition | Titles | Winning years | Runners-up |
|---|---|---|---|---|
| Continental CONCACAF | CONCACAF Cup Winners Cup | 1^{s} | 1995 | – |

Notes

- record
- ^{s} shared record

=== Friendly ===
- Torneo Sol de Valencia: 1979
- Torneo Cuadrangular Guadalupano: 1980

== Managers ==
- (Hungary) Árpád Fekete (1977–1978)
- (Austria) Helmut Senekowitsch (1978–1979, 1985–1988)
- (Socialist Federal Republic of Yugoslavia) (Mexico) Bora Milutinović (1988–1989)
- (Mexico) Víctor Manuel Vucetich (July 1993–June 1995), (July 1997–Aug 1998)
- (Argentina) Roberto Saporiti (July 1999–Dec 1999)
- (Argentina) Rubén Omar Romano (July 2000–Nov 2001)
- (Argentina) Oscar Ruggeri (2003)
- (Uruguay) Eduardo Acevedo (2003–2004)
- (Mexico) Daniel Guzmán (Oct 2004–June 5 2005)
- (Uruguay) Eduardo Acevedo (2005–2006)
- (Chile) Carlos Reinoso (March 2006–Sept 2006)
- (Argentina) Darío Franco (Sept 2006–Aug 2007)
- (Mexico) Jaime Ordiales (interim) (Aug 2007)
- (Argentina) César Luis Menotti (Sept 2007–Jan 2008)
- (Mexico) Jaime Ordiales (Jan 2008–March 2008)
- (Mexico) José Luis Trejo (March 2008–Sept 2008)
- (Mexico) Miguel Herrera (Sept 2008–Sept 2010)
- (Uruguay) Eduardo Acevedo (Sept 2010–Dec 2010)
- (Mexico) José Luis Sánchez (Jan 2011–Aug 2011)
- (Mexico) Álvaro Galindo (interim) (Aug 2011)
- (Mexico) Raúl Arias (Aug 2011–Nov 2011)
- (Mexico) José Luis Salgado (interim) (Nov 2011–Dec 2011)
- (Mexico) José Luis Salgado (Jan 2012)
- (Mexico) Gilberto Adame (Jan 2012) (interim)
- (Uruguay) Héctor Eugui (Jan 2012 – Dec 2012)
- (Mexico) Manuel Vidrio (Jan 2013 – Sep 2013)
- (Spain) Pako Ayestarán (Sep 2013 – Jun 2014)
- (Chile) Rodrigo Ruiz (Aug 2015 – May 2019)
- (Mexico) Daniel Alcántar (Jun 2019 – Dec 2020)
- (Mexico) Isaac Moreno (Dec 2020 – May 2021)
- (Mexico) Héctor Medrano (Jul 2021 – Jul 2022)
- (Mexico) Jorge Hernández (Jul 2022 – May 2025)
- (Mexico) Jesús Chávez (Jun 2025 – )

== Reserves ==
=== Tecos B/Estudiantes Tecos B ===
The team participated in the Liga de Nuevos Talentos of the Liga Premier, finishing as champions in the Apertura 2011, defeating América Coapa 4–1 on aggregate. It also finished as runners-up in the Campeón de Campeones de la Liga de Nuevos Talentos 2012, losing to Atlas "B" 4–2 on aggregate. The team also participated in the Torneo de Filiales de la Liga TDP, finished as champions in the 2021–22 season.

=== Tecos C/Tecos TDP ===
The team competes in the Liga TDP and won the Torneo de Filiales de la Liga TDP three times.

=== CEFO-ALR ===
The team participated in the Liga TDP, it was not eligible for promotion.
