= Francisco Castrejón =

Mexican footballer (born 1947)

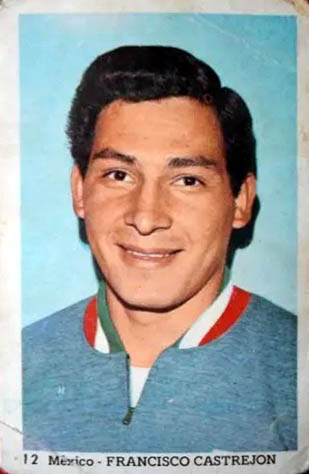
- Castrejón in 1970

Personal information
- Full name: Francisco Castrejón Ramírez
- Date of birth: June 11, 1947 (age 79)
- Place of birth: Mexico

Senior career*
Years	Team	Apps	(Gls)
1964–1972	Universidad Nacional		
1972–1973	Laguna		
1973–1975	Puebla		
1975–1979	América	85	(0)
1979–1980	Tampico	22	(0)
1980–1982	Atlas	56	(0)
1982–1983	Atlético Morelia	21	(0)

International career
1969–1981	Mexico	26	(0)
- * Club domestic league appearances and goals

Francisco Castrejón Ramírez (born 11 June 1947) is a Mexican former professional footballer who played as a goalkeeper. He was one of three goalkeepers for Mexico in the 1970 FIFA World Cup, but did not play any games there.

== Club career ==
Born in Tuxpan, Jalisco, Castrejón played club football for UNAM Pumas, Club de Fútbol Laguna, Puebla F.C., Club América, Tampico, F.C. Atlas and Atlético Morelia. He made his senior debut at age 18, appearing for Pumas in a match against Toluca on 3 February 1964.

Castrejón joined Laguna and played for the club in the 1972–73 Primera season. He signed with Puebla for the two following seasons, then joined América in 1975, where he would win the 1975–76 Mexican Primera División season title.

== International career ==
Castrejón made several appearances for the Mexico national football team. He made his debut as a substitute in a friendly against Colombia on 4 February 1969.
