= Miguel Ángel Cornero =

Argentine footballer

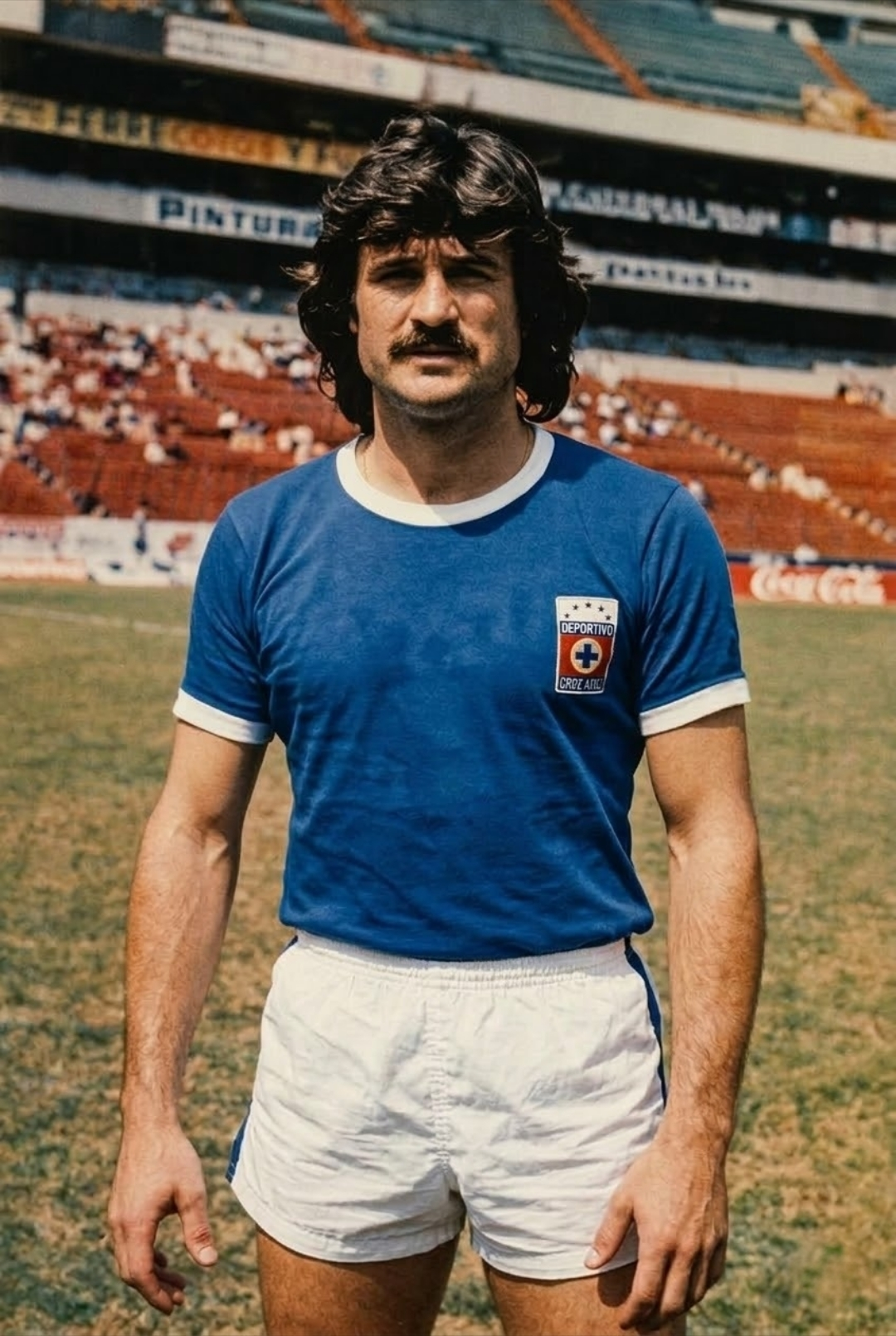

Personal information
- Full name: Miguel Ángel Cornero Valinotti
- Date of birth: 12 March 1952
- Place of birth: Rosario, Santa Fe, Argentina
- Date of death: 19 November 1999 (aged 47)
- Place of death: Mexico City, Mexico
- Height: 1.78 m (5 ft 10 in)
- Position: Defender

Senior career*
| Years | Team | Apps | (Gls) |
| 1971–1974 | Rosario Central | 12 | (1) |
| 1974–1977 | América | | |
| 1977–1982 | Cruz Azul | 146 | (17) |
| 1983–1984 | Toluca | 13 | (0) |
- * Club domestic league appearances and goals

Miguel Ángel Cornero (12 March 1952 – 19 November 1999) was an Argentine football defender.

== Career ==
Born in Rosario, Santa Fe, Cornero began playing football as a sweeper or stopper with hometown club Rosario Central. He was called into the Argentina national under-21 football team, but never appeared for the senior national team.

Cornero moved to Mexico in 1974, joining Club América for three seasons. He moved to crosstown rivals Cruz Azul, where he won the Mexican Primera División twice. He finished his career playing with Deportivo Toluca F.C. during the 1983–84 season, giving way to a debilitating nervous system injury which stemmed from a kick to the head suffered earlier in his career.

== Personal ==
Cornero died in a Mexico City hospital at age 47, survived by his wife and three children.
