= Javier Sánchez (footballer, born 1947) =

Mexican footballer (1947–2025)

Personal information
- Full name: José Javier Sánchez Galindo
- Date of birth: 26 November 1947
- Place of birth: Mexico City, Mexico
- Date of death: 29 September 2025 (aged 77)
- Position: Defender

Senior career*
Years	Team	Apps	(Gls)
1966–1974	Cruz Azul		
1974–1975	Guadalajara		
1975–1979	América	111	(1)
1979	Los Angeles Aztecs	1	(0)
1979–1982	Deportivo Neza	73	(1)

International career
1968–1977	Mexico	52	(0)
- * Club domestic league appearances and goals

José Javier Sánchez Galindo (26 November 1947 – 29 September 2025) was a Mexican footballer who played as a defender. He competed in the 1968 Summer Olympics. He died in September 2025, at the age of 77.
