= Mario Pérez (footballer, born 1946) =

Mexican footballer

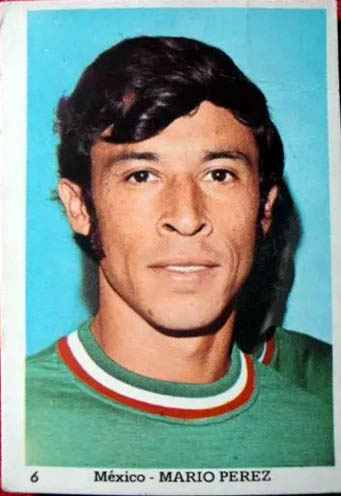
- Pérez in a trading card issued in Argentina, 1970

Personal information
- Full name: Mario Pérez Guadarrama
- Date of birth: 30 December 1946 (age 79)
- Place of birth: Mexico City, Mexico
- Height: 1.75 m (5 ft 9 in)
- Position: Defender

Senior career*
Years	Team	Apps	(Gls)
1965–1970	Necaxa		
1970–1978	América		
1978–1979	Tampico Madero	35	(2)

International career
1967–1973	Mexico	30	(1)

Managerial career
- 1986–1987: Necaxa
- 2003–2004: Alacranes de Durango
- 2008–2009: Pioneros de Cancún
- 2009–2012: Guerreros de Acapulco
- 2012: Reynosa
- 2013: Tampico Madero
- 2018: Gavilanes de Matamoros
- * Club domestic league appearances and goals

Mario Pérez Guadarrama (born 30 December 1946) is a Mexican former professional footballer who played as a defender for the Mexico national team between 1967 and 1973. He was part of the Mexico squad for the 1970 World Cup.

== Career ==
After he retired from playing, Pérez became a football manager. He was appointed manager of Club Necaxa in 1986.
