= Hugo Kiese =

Paraguayan footballer (born 1954)

Hugo Enrique Kiese Wisner (born 18 October 1954 in Tebicuary) is a former football midfielder that could also play as a striker, from Paraguay.

== Career ==
Kiese started his career in Olimpia Asunción where he won the 1975 Paraguayan 1st division and was the league topscorer in the same year. He was transferred to Club America of Mexico for the 1975/1976 season where he became an important player for the club winning several titles and playing a total of 105 games scoring 19 goals. Kiesse then moved to Tecos UAG where he became the all-time topscorer of the club with 115 goals. He also played for Atlas. He became Mexican citizen.

== Titles ==
Season	Team	Title
1975	(Paraguay) Olimpia	Paraguayan 1st Division
1975/76	(Mexico) América	Mexican 1st division
1976	(Mexico) América	Campeón de Campeones
1977	(Mexico) América	CONCACAF Champions League
1978	(Mexico) América	Copa Interamericana
