= Carlos Reinoso =

Chilean footballer (born 1945)

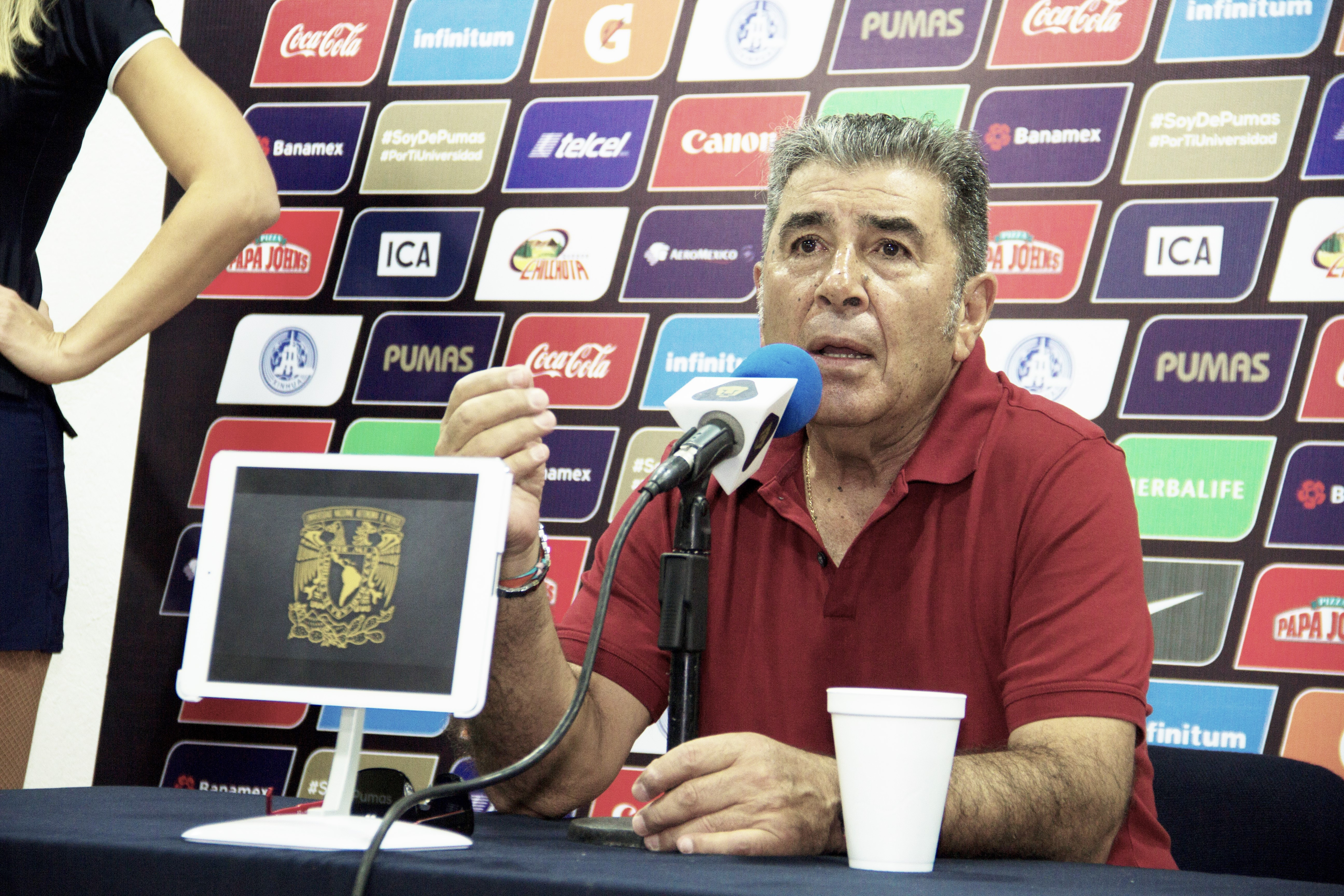
- Reinoso in 2015

Personal information
- Full name: Carlos Enzo Reinoso Valdenegro
- Date of birth: 7 March 1945 (age 81)
- Place of birth: Santiago, Chile
- Height: 5 ft 7 in (1.70 m)
- Position: Midfielder

Youth career
- Audax Italiano

Senior career*
| Years | Team | Apps | (Gls) |
| 1962–1969 | Audax Italiano | 158 | (73) |
| 1970–1979 | América | 297 | (88) |
| 1979–1981 | Deportivo Neza | 33 | (7) |
| Total | | 488 | (168) |

International career
| 1966–1977 | Chile | 34 | (7) |

Managerial career
- 1981–1984: América
- 1985–1987: Tampico
- 1987–1988: Atlas
- 1988–1989: Tampico Madero
- 1989–1992: Tigres UANL
- 1992–1994: Veracruz
- 1994–1996: Toros Neza
- 1997: León
- 1998: América
- 1999: Tecos
- 1999–2000: León
- 2001–2002: Atlante
- 2003: León
- 2004: San Luis
- 2005–2006: Tecos
- 2009–2010: Querétaro
- 2011: América
- 2015–2016: Veracruz
- 2016–2017: Veracruz
- 2019: Correcaminos UAT
- * Club domestic league appearances and goals

Carlos Enzo Exzequiel Reinoso Valdenegro (born 7 March 1945) is a Chilean former footballer and manager who recently managed Mexican club UAT.

He began his career in the 1960s playing for Audax Italiano in his native Chile. In 1970 Reinoso was scouted by Mexican club América, with whom he played for nine years. He is considered one of the greatest foreign players in Mexican football history, and widely regarded as the greatest player in Club América history.

== Playing career ==
Carlos Reinoso began his playing career playing for boyhood club Audax Italiano, joining them at age 15. He played in over 150 games with Audax before he was sold to Club América of Mexico.

His debut with América came in 1970 in a league match against Atlante. Reinoso played in over 200 matches with the Mexican club, winning the league in the 1970–71 and 1975–76 seasons, as well as the Copa México in 1973–74, a Campeón de Campeones cup in 1975–76, a CONCACAF Cup in 1977, and a Copa Interamericana in 1978. To date, he is the foreigner with the most games played for Club América, playing in 364 games across all competitions, and with 95 goals he is the club's seventh-highest scorer of all time.

In 1979, Reinoso played a season with Deportivo Neza, before retiring and embarking on a coaching career.

A Chilean international, Reinoso played in 34 matches and scored 7 goals with the national team from 1966 till 1977, and played at the 1974 FIFA World Cup, as well as the 1975 Copa America.

== Coaching career ==
In 1981, Reinoso was named head coach of Club América, with whom he won two league titles, most notably winning the 1983–84 final against rivals Guadalajara. He would go on to manage a number of different clubs in Mexico including former club Neza, Tigres UANL, Tampico Madero, Atlas, Veracruz, León, Atlante, Quéretaro, Tecos UAG, and San Luis, with varying degrees of success.

He managed América twice more, in 1998 and 2011, and last managed Veracruz from 2015 till 2017, winning the Clausura 2016 Copa MX after defeating Necaxa in the final.

He also has won two league titles of the Mexican second level with León and San Luis.

== Personal life ==
In Mexico, he was nicknamed El Gran Chaparral by the journalist Ángel Fernández due to his short height and great football qualities.

He married the Mexican singer Lupita D'Alessio and dated Verónica Castro.

His son Carlos Jr. is a Mexican football manager and former footballer.

== Honours ==
=== Player ===
América

- Primera División (2): 1970–71, 1975–76
- Copa México (1): 1973–74
- Campeón de Campeones (1): 1976
- CONCACAF Champions' Cup (1): 1977
- Copa Interamericana (1): 1977

=== Managerial ===
América

- Primera División (1): 1983–84

León

- Primera División A: 2003 Verano

San Luis

- Primera División A: 2004 Apertura

Veracruz

- Copa MX (1): Clausura 2016

=== Individual ===
- Top scorer of the Chilean Primera División (1): 1968
- Club América Hall of Fame
- Soccer Hall of Fame: 2011
