= 1975 Copa Ciudad de México squads =

These are the squads for the countries that played in the 1975 Copa Ciudad de México.

The age listed for each player is on 17 August 1975, the first day of the tournament. The numbers of caps and goals listed for each player do not include any matches played after the start of the tournament. The club listed is the club for which the player last played a competitive match before the tournament. The nationality for each club reflects the national association (not the league) to which the club is affiliated. A flag is included for coaches who are of a different nationality than their own national team.

Argentina had a single player represent a foreign club.

== Argentina ==
Head coach: Miguel Juárez

No.	Pos.	Player	Date of birth (age)	Caps	Club
1	GK	Ricardo La Volpe	2 June 1952 (aged 23)		(Argentina) San Lorenzo
2	DF	Aldo Espinoza	5 January 1955 (aged 20)		(Argentina) Huracán
3	DF	Edgar Oscar Fernández	21 February 1952 (aged 23)		(Argentina) Colón
4	DF	José María Suárez	1 May 1951 (aged 24)		(Argentina) Belgrano
5	MF	Américo Gallego	25 April 1955 (aged 20)		(Argentina) Newell's Old Boys
6	DF	Pablo de las Mercedes Cárdenas	15 January 1949 (aged 26)		(Argentina) Juventud Antoniana
7	FW	Hugo Coscia	12 October 1952 (aged 22)		(Mexico) Atlético Potosino
8	MF	Armando Ignacio Quinteros	28 March 1956 (aged 19)		(Argentina) Vélez Sársfield
9	FW	Daniel Astegiano	27 August 1952 (aged 22)		(Argentina) Ledesma
10	MF	José Daniel Valencia	3 October 1955 (aged 19)		(Argentina) Talleres de Córdoba
11	MF	Osvaldo Ardiles	3 August 1952 (aged 23)		(Argentina) Huracán
12	GK	Héctor Baley	16 November 1950 (aged 24)		(Argentina) Huracán
13	MF	Miguel Oviedo	12 October 1950 (aged 24)		(Argentina) Talleres de Córdoba
14	DF	Enzo Trossero	23 May 1953 (aged 22)		(Argentina) Independiente
15	MF	Daniel Marangoni	19 August 1952 (aged 22)		(Argentina) San Martín de Tucumán
16	FW	Jorge Valdano	4 October 1955 (aged 19)		(Argentina) Newell's Old Boys
17	FW	Ángel Bocanelli	22 January 1953 (aged 22)		(Argentina) Talleres de Córdoba

== Costa Rica ==
Head coach: (Uruguay) José Etchegoyen

No.	Pos.	Player	Date of birth (age)	Caps	Club
1	GK	Gladstone Edmond	20 March 1950 (aged 25)		(Costa Rica) Herediano
2	DF	Alfonso Estupiñán	4 June 1948 (aged 27)		(Costa Rica) Alajuelense
3	DF	Jorge Enrique Vásquez	23 February 1954 (aged 21)		(Costa Rica) Alajuelense
4	DF	Dervin Barboza	30 July 1953 (aged 22)		(Costa Rica) Ramonense
5	MF	Fernando Hernández	28 May 1944 (aged 31)		(Costa Rica) Saprissa
6	DF	Carlos Watson	22 November 1951 (aged 23)		(Costa Rica) Herediano
7	MF	Rafael Ángel Camacho	24 October 1950 (aged 24)		(Costa Rica) Herediano
8	FW	Asdrúbal Paniagua	29 June 1951 (aged 24)		(Costa Rica) Saprissa
9	FW	Alfredo Piedra Gutiérrez	28 July 1953 (aged 22)		(Costa Rica) Cartaginés
10	MF	Rolando Villalobos	25 July 1953 (aged 22)		(Costa Rica) Alajuelense
11	FW	Javier Jiménez	1 August 1952 (aged 23)		(Costa Rica) Alajuelense
12	MF	Mario Barrantes	14 July 1954 (aged 21)		(Costa Rica) Alajuelense
13	FW	Vicente Wanchope	16 July 1946 (aged 29)		(Costa Rica) Herediano
14	DF	Álvaro Sánchez Guzmán	14 December 1949 (aged 25)		(Costa Rica) Herediano
15	DF	José María Agüero	25 June 1947 (aged 28)		(Costa Rica) Alajuelense
16	FW	Carlos Solano	2 July 1952 (aged 23)		(Costa Rica) Saprissa
17	DF	Heriberto Rojas	18 July 1943 (aged 32)		(Costa Rica) Saprissa
18	FW	Johnny Alvarado	5 August 1954 (aged 21)		(Costa Rica) Cartaginés
19	GK	Dennis Valladares			(Costa Rica) Saprissa
20	GK	Víctor Monge	30 October 1954 (aged 20)		(Costa Rica) Cartaginés
21	DF	Miguel Simpson	25 September 1955 (aged 19)		(Costa Rica) Limonense
22	FW	Eduardo Chavarría	21 March 1943 (aged 32)		(Costa Rica) Herediano

== Mexico ==
Head coach: Nacho Trelles

No.	Pos.	Player	Date of birth (age)	Caps	Club
1	GK	Moisés Camacho	27 April 1947 (aged 28)		(Mexico) Atlético Español
2	DF	Ignacio Flores	31 July 1953 (aged 22)	4	(Mexico) Cruz Azul
3	DF	Eduardo Ramos	9 November 1949 (aged 25)		(Mexico) Toluca
4	DF	Javier Sánchez	26 November 1947 (aged 27)		(Mexico) Guadalajara
5	DF	Arturo Vázquez	26 June 1949 (aged 26)		(Mexico) Pumas UNAM
6	MF	Antonio de la Torre	21 September 1951 (aged 23)		(Mexico) América
7	FW	Juan Alvarado	27 December 1948 (aged 26)		(Mexico) Puebla
8	MF	Chepe Chávez	4 August 1952 (aged 23)		(Mexico) León
9	FW	Fausto Vargas	8 February 1947 (aged 28)		(Mexico) Tecos UAG
10	FW	Pepe Delgado	10 January 1947 (aged 28)		(Mexico) Atlas
11	FW	Leonardo Cuéllar	14 January 1952 (aged 23)		(Mexico) Pumas UNAM
12	GK	Alfonso Reynoso	25 October 1953 (aged 21)		(Mexico) Guadalajara
13	DF	José Luis Trejo	4 August 1951 (aged 24)		(Mexico) Atlético Español
14	MF	Manuel Nájera	10 February 1952 (aged 23)		(Mexico) Leones Negros UdeG
15	MF	Manuel Manzo	10 February 1952 (aged 23)		(Mexico) Atlético Español
16	FW	Enrique Borja	30 December 1945 (aged 29)		(Mexico) América
17	FW	Rubén Anguiano	17 November 1950 (aged 24)		(Mexico) Leones Negros UdeG
18	MF	Salvador Carillo	12 July 1949 (aged 26)		(Mexico) Unión de Curtidores
19	DF	Jesús Rico	11 January 1953 (aged 22)		(Mexico) Atlético Español
20	FW	Horacio López Salgado	15 September 1948 (aged 26)		(Mexico) Cruz Azul
21	GK	Jaime Julio Aguilar	12 April 1956 (aged 19)		(Mexico) Atlético Español
22	MF	José Luis Herrera	25 July 1949 (aged 26)		(Mexico) Atlas
23	DF	Alejandro Villalobos	21 April 1953 (aged 22)		(Mexico) Unión de Curtidores
24	FW	Pedro Damián Álvarez	23 February 1949 (aged 26)		(Mexico) Guadalajara
25	FW	Mario Medina	2 September 1952 (aged 22)	5	(Mexico) Toluca

=== United States ===
Head coach: (Germany) Manfred Schellscheidt

No.	Pos.	Player	Date of birth (age)	Caps	Club
1	GK	Arnie Mausser	28 February 1954 (aged 21)		(United States) Hartford Bicentennials
2	DF	Werner Roth	8 April 1948 (aged 27)		(United States) New York Cosmos
3	DF	Bill Straub	11 August 1951 (aged 24)		(United States) Philadelphia Atoms
4	MF	Dick Hall	3 July 1945 (aged 30)		(United States) Dallas Tornado
5	DF	Peter Chandler	19 March 1953 (aged 22)		(United States) Hartford Bicentennials
6	FW	Hank Liotart	15 November 1943 (aged 31)		(United States) Seattle Sounders
7	DF	Alex Skotarek	2 April 1949 (aged 26)		(United States) Chicago Sting
8	MF	Johnny Moore	28 August 1947 (aged 27)		(United States) San Jose Earthquakes
9	FW	Charlie McCully	30 April 1947 (aged 28)		(United States) Hartford Bicentennials
10	FW	Henry McCully	30 April 1948 (aged 27)		(United States) Hartford Bicentennials
11	FW	Archie Roboostoff	9 October 1951 (aged 23)		(United States) San Jose Earthquakes
12	DF	Altino Domingues	2 November 1951 (aged 23)		(United States) Rhode Island Oceaneers
13	DF	Alain Maca	10 February 1950 (aged 25)		(United States) Washington Diplomats
14	FW	Joey Fink	31 July 1951 (aged 24)		(United States) New York Cosmos
15	MF	Johnny Moore	24 November 1948 (aged 26)		(United States) San Jose Earthquakes
16	DF	Robert García	5 October 1953 (aged 21)		(United States) Hartford Bicentennials
22	GK	Bob Rigby	3 July 1951 (aged 24)		(United States) Philadelphia Atoms
