= 1975 Copa Ciudad de México =

Copa Fraternidad

Tournament details
- Host country: Mexico
- Dates: 17 August – 31 August
- Teams: 4 (from 2 confederations)
- Venue: 1 (in 1 host city)

Final positions
- Champions: Mexico (1st title)
- Runners-up: Argentina
- Third place: Costa Rica
- Fourth place: United States

Tournament statistics
- Matches played: 6
- Goals scored: 23 (3.83 per match)
- Top scorer(s): (Mexico) Pepe Delgado (13 goals) (Argentina) Hugo Coscia (13 goals)

The 1975 Copa Ciudad de México was an international football tournament held in Mexico, from 17 August to 31 August 1975 as a series of friendlies to prepare for the 1975 Pan American Games. Sometimes referred to as the Copa Fraternidad, hosts Mexico ultimately won on point difference, narrowly beating Argentina.

== Format ==
Four teams competed with 3 teams from CONCACAF (North and Central America and the Caribbean) as well as Argentina representing CONMEBOL (South America).

== Venue ==
Mexico City, Federal District
Estadio Azteca
Capacity: 107,247
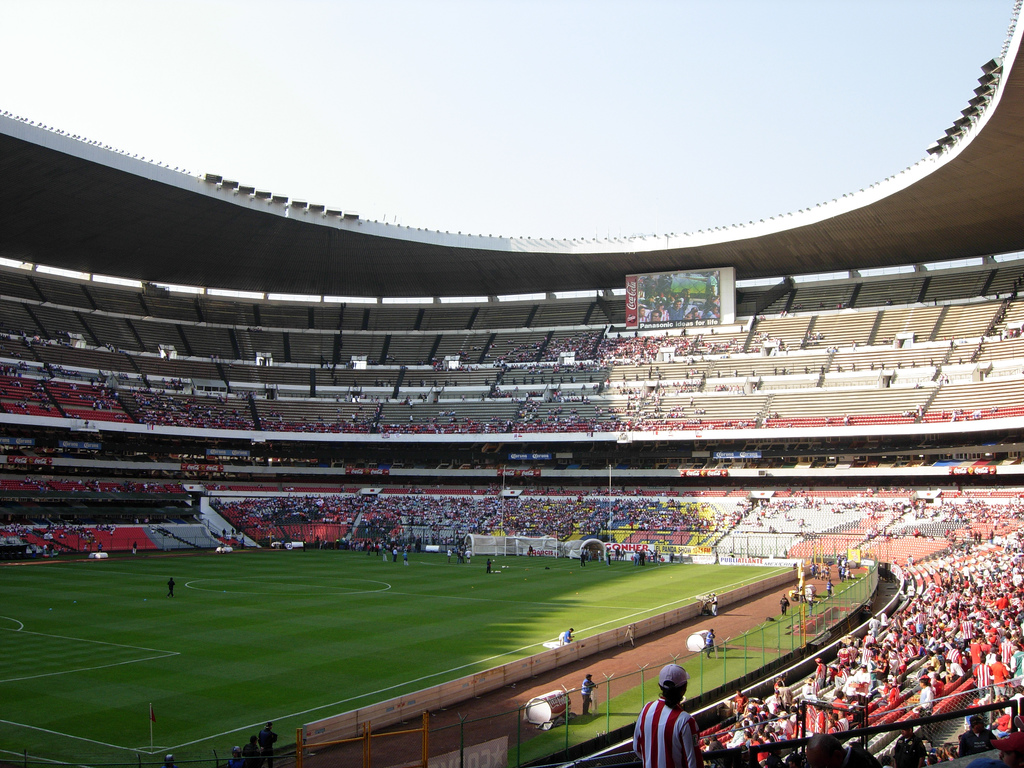

== Tournament review ==
The first match held in the tournament was infamous for Costa Rica as the match would end in a 7–0 thrashing by hosts Mexico with a notable loss being the expulsion of Costa Rican goalkeeper Gladstone Edmond following a foul and Víctor Monge suddenly being tasked to replace him. This match is still the worst result by the Ticos alongside another 7–0 defeat by Spain at the 2022 FIFA World Cup. This tournament was also unique in where Argentina saw 9 players make their international debuts in a similar 6–0 thrashing against the United States. Mexico would narrowly win the tournament following a strong defense within the second half that prevented Argentina from scoring a second goal, winning on goals for difference.

== Matches ==
All times listed are local (UTC−6)

=== Mexico vs Costa Rica ===
17 August 1975
12:00

Mexico	7–0	Costa Rica
Alvarado 2'; Álvarez 9'; Delgado 25', 86'; Cuéllar 67', 70'; Vargas 90'	Report

Estadio Azteca, Mexico City
Attendance: 10,000
Referee: Arturo Yamasaki (Peru & Mexico)

Mexico	Costa Rica

GK	1	Moisés Camacho
DF	2	Ignacio Flores
DF	3	Eduardo Ramos (c)
DF	4	Javier Sánchez	(red card) 89'
DF	5	Arturo Vázquez
MF	6	Antonio de la Torre
MF	8	Chepe Chávez	(substituted off) 62'
MF	10	Pepe Delgado
FW	7	Juan Alvarado
FW	9	Fausto Vargas
FW	11	Pedro D. Álvarez	(substituted off) 62'
Substitutes:
GK	12	Alfonso Reynoso
MF	15	Manuel Manzo	(substituted on) 62'
MF	14	Manuel Nájera
FW	9	Enrique Borja
MF	17	Leonardo Cuéllar	(substituted on) 62'
Manager:
(Mexico) Nacho Trelles

GK	1	Gladstone Edmond	(red card) 31'
DF	2	Alfonso Estupiñán
DF	4	Dervin Barboza	(substituted off) 46'
DF	6	Carlos Watson
DF	4	Wilberth Barquero
MF	18	Johnny Alvarado
MF	5	Fernando Hernández	(substituted off) 46'
MF	12	Mario Barrantes
FW	7	Rafael Ángel Camacho	(substituted off) 73'
FW	8	Asdrúbal Paniagua
FW	10	Rolando Villalobos (c)
Substitutions:
GK	20	Víctor Monge	(substituted on) 31'
FW	16	Carlos Solano	(substituted on) 46'
FW	9	Alfredo Piedra	(substituted on) 73'
Manager:
(Uruguay) José Etchegoyen

=== Costa Rica vs United States ===
19 August 1975
12:00

Costa Rica	3–1	United States
Paniagua 81', 86'; Jiménez 88'	Report	H. McCully 76'

Estadio Azteca, Mexico City
Attendance: 1,000
Referee: Jorge Alberto Narváez (Mexico)

Costa Rica	United States

GK	20	Víctor Monge
DF	2	Álvaro Sánchez
DF	3	Jorge Enrique Vásquez (c)
DF	4	Dervin Barboza
DF	6	Carlos Watson
MF	12	Mario Barrantes
MF	7	Rafael Ángel Camacho	(substituted off) 75'
MF	18	Johnny Alvarado	(substituted off) 63'
FW	16	Carlos Solano	(substituted off) 81'
FW	10	Rolando Villalobos (c)
FW	11	Javier Jiménez
Substitutions:
MF	13	Vicente Wanchope	(substituted on) 75'
MF	19	Asdrúbal Paniagua	(substituted on) 63'
MF	5	Fernando Hernández	(substituted on) 81'
Manager:
(Uruguay) José Etchegoyen

GK	22	Bob Rigby
DF	2	Werner Roth (c)	(substituted off) 46'
DF	3	Bill Straub
DF	7	Alex Skotarek
DF	5	Peter Chandler
MF	6	Hank Liotart
MF	4	Dick Hall
MF	8	Johnny Moore
FW	9	Charlie McCully
FW	10	Henry McCully
FW	11	Archie Roboostoff
Substitutions:
DF	12	Altino Domingues	(substituted on) 46'
Manager:
(Germany) Manfred Schellscheidt

=== Argentina vs United States ===
21 August 1975
12:00

Argentina	6–0	United States
Ardiles 18', 23'; Cárdenas 36'; Coscia 58', 90'; Valencia 82'	Report

Estadio Azteca, Mexico City
Attendance: 1,500
Referee: Javier Galindo (Mexico)

Argentina	United States

GK	1	Ricardo La Volpe	(substituted off) 70'
DF	6	Pablo Cárdenas (c)	(substituted off) 78'
DF	3	Edgar Oscar Fernández
DF	4	José María Suárez
DF	5	Américo Gallego	(substituted off) 66'
MF	2	Aldo Espinoza
MF	8	Armando I. Quinteros
MF	11	Osvaldo Ardiles
FW	9	Daniel Astegiano
FW	10	José Daniel Valencia
FW	20	Hugo Coscia
Substitutions:
GK	12	Héctor Baley	(substituted on) 70'
DF	14	Enzo Trossero	(substituted on) 78'
MF	13	Miguel Oviedo	(substituted on) 66'
Manager:
(Argentina) Miguel Juárez

GK	1	Arnie Mausser
DF	13	Alain Maca
DF	12	Altino Domingues
DF	3	Bill Straub
DF	16	Robert García
MF	4	Dick Hall	(substituted off) 65'
MF	15	Ed Kelly
DF	5	Peter Chandler
FW	9	Charlie McCully (c)
FW	6	Hank Liotart	(substituted off) 38'
FW	11	Archie Roboostoff
Substitutions:
MF	8	Johnny Moore	(substituted on) 65'
MF	14	Joey Fink	(substituted on) 38'
Manager:
(Germany) Manfred Schellscheidt

=== Mexico vs United States ===
24 August 1975
12:00

Mexico	2–0	United States
Borja 44'; Delgado 66'	Report

Estadio Azteca, Mexico City
Attendance: 10,000
Referee: Arturo Yamasaki (Peru & Mexico)

Mexico	United States

GK	1	Moisés Camacho
DF	2	Jesús Rico
DF	3	Eduardo Ramos (c)
DF	4	Javier Sánchez
DF	5	Arturo Vázquez
MF	6	Antonio de la Torre
MF	8	Manuel Manzo	(substituted off) 57'
MF	10	Pepe Delgado
FW	7	Juan Alvarado
FW	9	Horacio López Salgado	(substituted off) 30'
FW	11	Leonardo Cuéllar
Substitutes:
FW	17	Rubén Anguiano	(substituted on) 57'
FW	16	Enrique Borja	(substituted on) 30'
Manager:
(Mexico) Nacho Trelles

GK	22	Bob Rigby
DF	12	Altino Domingues
DF	13	Alain Maca
DF	9	Charlie McCully (c)
DF	5	Peter Chandler
MF	15	Ed Kelly
MF	4	Dick Hall
MF	6	Hank Liotart	(substituted off) 71'
FW	7	Alex Skotarek
FW	14	Joey Fink	(substituted off) 66'
FW	10	Henry McCully
Substitutions:
DF	16	Robert García	(substituted on) 71'
FW	11	Archie Roboostoff	(substituted on) 66' (substituted off) 89'
DF	3	Bill Straub	(substituted on) 89'
Manager:
(Germany) Manfred Schellscheidt

=== Argentina vs Costa Rica ===
28 August 1975
12:00

Argentina	2–0	Costa Rica
Astegiano 26', 50'	Report

Estadio Azteca, Mexico City
Attendance: 1,200
Referee: Alfonso González Archundia (Mexico)

Argentina	Costa Rica

GK	1	Ricardo La Volpe	(substituted off) 70'
DF	4	José María Suárez
DF	6	Pablo Cárdenas (c)
DF	14	Enzo Trossero	(substituted off) 46'
DF	3	Edgar Oscar Fernández
MF	8	Armando I. Quinteros
MF	5	Américo Gallego
MF	11	Osvaldo Ardiles	(substituted off) 81'
FW	7	Hugo Coscia
FW	9	Daniel Astegiano	(substituted off) 82'
FW	20	José Daniel Valencia	(substituted off) 82'
Substitutions:
MF	13	Miguel Oviedo	(substituted on) 46'
MF	15	Daniel Marangoni	(substituted on) 78'
FW	17	Ángel Bocanelli	(substituted on) 82'
Manager:
(Argentina) Miguel Juárez

GK	20	Víctor Monge
DF	2	Álvaro Sánchez	(substituted off) 46'
DF	15	José María Agüero
DF	3	Heriberto Rojas	(substituted off) 46'
DF	6	Jorge Enrique Vásquez
MF	12	Mario Barrantes
MF	19	Asdrúbal Paniagua
MF	10	Rolando Villalobos (c)
FW	7	Rafael Ángel Camacho	(substituted off) 60'
FW	16	Carlos Solano
FW	11	Javier Jiménez
Substitutions:
MF	18	Johnny Alvarado	(substituted on) 46' (red card) 48'
MF	13	Vicente Wanchope	(substituted on) 60'
DF	2	Alfonso Estupiñán	(substituted on) 46'
Manager:
(Uruguay) José Etchegoyen

=== Mexico vs Argentina ===
31 August 1975
12:00

Mexico	1–1	Argentina
Vargas 5'	Report	Coscia 34'

Estadio Azteca, Mexico City
Attendance: 35,000
Referee: Arturo Yamasaki (Peru & Mexico)

Mexico	Argentina

GK	1	Moisés Camacho
DF	2	Manuel Nájera
DF	4	Eduardo Ramos (c)
DF	3	Javier Sánchez
DF	5	Arturo Vázquez
MF	6	Antonio de la Torre
MF	8	Chepe Chávez	(substituted off) 63'
MF	10	Pepe Delgado	(substituted off) 73'
FW	7	Juan Alvarado
FW	9	Fausto Vargas
FW	11	Leonardo Cuéllar
Substitutes:
MF	15	Manuel Manzo	(substituted on) 63'
MF	14	Salvador Carrillo	(substituted on) 73'
Manager:
(Mexico) Nacho Trelles

GK	1	Ricardo La Volpe
DF	4	José María Suárez
DF	2	Aldo Espinoza
DF	6	Pablo Cárdenas (c)
DF	3	Edgar Oscar Fernández
MF	8	Armando I. Quinteros	(substituted off) 60'
MF	5	Américo Gallego
MF	11	Osvaldo Ardiles
FW	7	Hugo Coscia
FW	9	Daniel Astegiano	(substituted off) 82'
FW	10	José Daniel Valencia	(substituted off) 71'
Substitutions:
MF	13	Miguel Oviedo	(substituted on) 35'
MF	15	Daniel Marangoni	(substituted on) 60'
FW	17	Ángel Bocanelli	(substituted on) 71'
Manager:
(Argentina) Miguel Juárez

== Goalscorers ==
3 goals

- (Mexico) Pepe Delgado
- (Argentina) Hugo Coscia

2 goals

- (Argentina) Daniel Astegiano
- (Argentina) Osvaldo Ardiles
- (Costa Rica) Asdrúbal Paniagua
- (Mexico) Leonardo Cuéllar
- (Mexico) Fausto Vargas

1 goal

- (Argentina) Pablo de las Mercedes Cárdenas
- (Argentina) José Daniel Valencia
- (Costa Rica) Javier Jiménez
- (Mexico) Juan Alvarado
- (Mexico) Pedro Damián Álvarez
- (Mexico) Enrique Borja
- (United States) Henry McCully
