= 1973–74 Mexican Primera División season =

32nd professional season of the top-flight football league in Mexico

Primera División de México
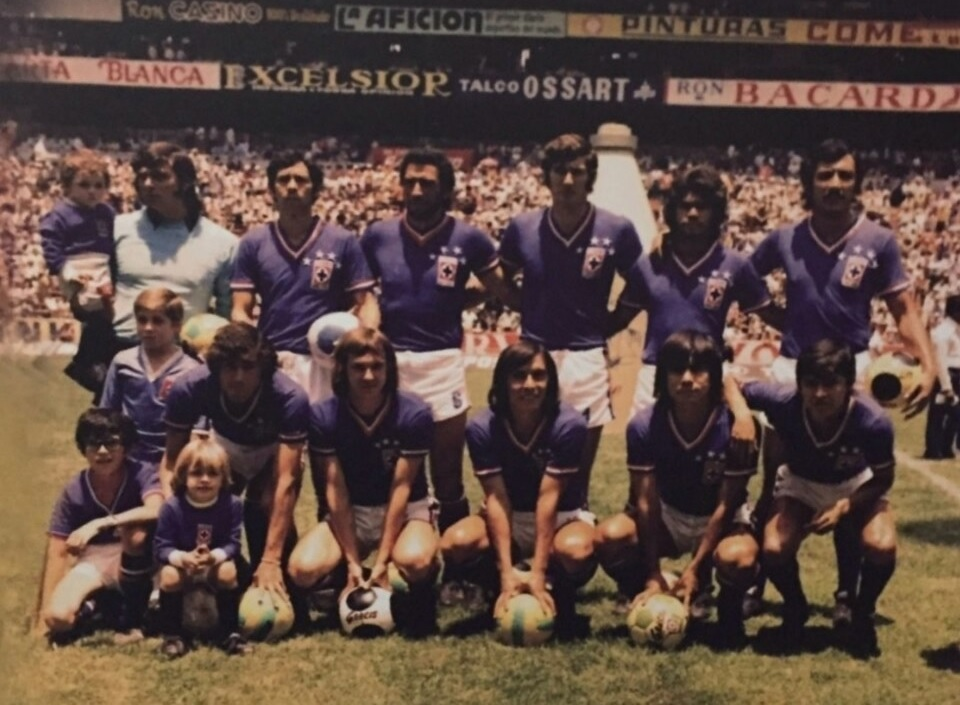
- The Cruz Azul winning squad for the season.
- Season: 1973–74
- Champions: Cruz Azul (5th title)
- Relegated: San Luis
- Champions' Cup: Monterrey; Atlético Español
- Matches: 314
- Goals: 941 (3 per match)
- Top goalscorer: Osvaldo Castro (26 goals)

Statistics of the Primera División de México for the 1973–74 season.

== Overview ==
Ciudad Madero was promoted to Primera División.

This season was contested by 18 teams, and Cruz Azul won the championship.

San Luis was relegated to Segunda División.

UDG acquired Torreón franchise to reach the Primera Division for the 1974–75 season.

Segunda División semifinalists, UASLP-Pumas (re-branded to Atlético Potosino) and Unión de Curtidores were promoted to the Primera División to increase the number of teams to 20 for the 1974–75 season.

=== Teams ===
Location of the 1973-74 Primera División teams

Team	City	Stadium
América	Mexico City	Azteca
Atlante	Mexico City	Azteca
Atlas	Guadalajara, Jalisco	Jalisco
Atlético Español	Mexico City	Azteca
Ciudad Madero	Ciudad Madero, Tamaulipas	Tamaulipas
Cruz Azul	Mexico City	Azteca
Guadalajara	Guadalajara, Jalisco	Jalisco
Jalisco	Guadalajara, Jalisco	Jalisco
Laguna	Torreón, Coahuila	San Isidro
León	León, Guanajuato	León
Monterrey	Monterrey, Nuevo León	Universitario
Puebla	Puebla, Puebla	Cuauhtémoc
San Luis	San Luis Potosí, S.L.P.	Plan de San Luis
Toluca	Toluca, State of Mexico	Toluca 70
Torreón	Torreón, Coahuila	Moctezuma
UNAM	Mexico City	Olímpico Universitario
Veracruz	Veracruz, Veracruz	Veracruzano
Zacatepec	Zacatepec, Morelos	Agustín "Coruco" Díaz

== Group stage ==
=== Group 1 ===
Pos	Team	Pld	W	D	L	GF	GA	GD	Pts	Qualification
1	Cruz Azul	34	18	13	3	69	35	+34	49	Playoffs
2	Monterrey	34	22	4	8	65	36	+29	48	Playoffs
3	Toluca	34	14	11	9	53	43	+10	39	
4	UNAM	34	12	13	9	55	42	+13	37	
5	Atlas	34	14	8	12	53	52	+1	36	
6	Jalisco	34	13	9	12	51	49	+2	35	
7	Guadalajara	34	11	12	11	43	45	−2	34	
8	Zacatepec	34	12	9	13	48	51	−3	33	
9	Laguna	34	9	10	15	39	54	−15	28	Relegation Playoff

=== Group 2 ===
Pos	Team	Pld	W	D	L	GF	GA	GD	Pts	Qualification
1	Atlético Español	34	15	11	8	66	47	+19	41	Playoffs
2	Puebla	34	13	14	7	57	40	+17	40	Playoffs
3	León	34	12	16	6	62	44	+18	40	
4	América	34	14	9	11	55	43	+12	37	
5	Torreón	34	8	9	17	47	72	−25	25	
6	Atlante	34	5	14	15	44	67	−23	24	
7	Ciudad Madero	34	6	11	17	38	75	−37	23	
8	Veracruz	34	7	8	19	33	53	−20	22	
9	San Luis	34	8	5	21	35	65	−30	21	Relegation Playoff

== Results ==
Home \ Away	AME	ATT	ATL	ATE	CRA	GDL	JAL	LAG	LEO	CDM	MTY	PUE	SAL	TOL	TOR	UNI	VER	ZAC
América		2–2	2–1	3–0	2–1	0–1	2–0	1–0	4–0	1–1	0–1	0–1	1–1	1–2	2–0	2–1	3–1	3–2
Atlante	1–4		2–2	2–2	1–4	2–2	2–1	2–1	1–1	2–2	0–3	0–2	4–0	3–2	0–0	0–2	2–4	1–1
Atlas	1–2	1–1		2–2	0–2	1–2	1–1	4–0	1–1	1–2	1–3	3–2	1–0	0–1	4–1	2–0	2–1	0–1
Atlético Español	3–3	3–2	5–1		0–3	3–1	3–0	2–2	3–1	7–0	3–1	0–0	5–1	1–0	3–1	1–1	2–0	1–0
Cruz Azul	4–2	3–2	1–2	3–3		0–0	2–1	1–1	1–0	5–0	2–0	1–1	2–0	1–1	4–1	2–2	2–0	4–0
Guadalajara	0–2	1–0	1–3	1–0	1–1		0–1	3–1	2–2	3–0	1–1	2–2	1–2	3–2	3–4	0–3	1–0	2–2
Jalisco	2–1	0–2	2–3	3–3	1–2	0–1		2–0	1–1	6–3	0–1	1–2	2–1	4–0	2–2	2–2	2–1	1–0
Laguna	1–1	3–2	1–0	2–0	0–0	3–1	3–3		0–1	3–1	2–4	1–4	2–4	2–2	2–0	2–0	2–0	0–0
León	2–2	2–0	1–1	2–2	2–2	4–2	2–3	1–1		1–1	2–0	4–2	3–0	7–0	4–0	3–3	3–2	3–1
Ciudad Madero	0–2	0–0	1–3	0–2	1–2	0–0	2–2	2–1	1–1		3–0	1–1	1–1	1–1	4–0	0–1	3–3	1–2
Monterrey	2–1	3–1	0–2	2–2	1–0	1–0	0–2	1–0	2–0	3–0		4–3	2–1	1–1	3–1	1–0	1–0	0–1
Puebla	2–1	4–1	2–2	1–1	2–2	0–2	0–0	0–0	2–1	0–1	1–1		6–0	1–1	3–3	2–2	3–0	3–1
San Luis	1–0	4–1	1–2	2–3	1–2	1–1	1–2	3–0	0–0	2–1	1–5	2–1		0–2	1–0	1–1	0–1	0–1
Toluca	2–2	0–1	3–0	3–0	3–3	1–0	0–1	1–0	0–0	4–0	2–0	0–1	2–1		3–1	2–2	3–1	1–1
Torreón	3–2	3–1	1–2	1–1	0–1	0–0	3–1	4–0	2–2	4–3	1–5	0–1	2–1	2–2		1–1	2–2	1–3
UNAM	1–1	3–3	4–0	1–0	0–2	0–0	0–0	3–1	2–3	4–0	0–4	1–1	3–1	0–1	4–1		4–0	2–1
Veracruz	0–0	2–0	1–2	0–0	2–2	1–3	2–0	1–1	0–0	1–2	0–2	0–1	2–0	1–0	2–0	0–1		1–1
Zacatepec	3–0	0–0	2–2	2–0	2–2	2–2	1–2	0–1	0–2	6–0	2–7	1–0	3–0	1–5	0–2	2–1	3–1	

Legend: Blue = home team win; Yellow = draw; Red = away team win.

== Relegation playoff ==
28 April 1974

San Luis	0-0	Laguna

Estadio Plan de San Luis, San Luis Potosí
5 May 1974

Laguna	2-0	San Luis
Perucci 32'; Micó 90'

Estadio San Isidro, Torreón

Laguna won 2-0 on aggregate. San Luis relegated to Segunda Division.

== Championship playoff ==
=== Bracket ===
Semifinals
1	Cruz Azul	1	6	7
4	Puebla	1	1	2
2	Monterrey	4	1	5
3	Atlético Español	3	3	6

Final
1	Cruz Azul	1	3	4
3	Atlético Español	2	0	2

=== Semifinal ===
28 April 1974

Puebla	1-1	Cruz Azul
Alvarado 58'		Pérez 23' (own)

Estadio Cuauhtémoc, Puebla
5 May 1974

Cruz Azul	6-1	Puebla
Vera 5', 90'; Estrada 41'; Gómez 51'; López Salgado 74'; Andrade 76'		Zibecchi 7'

Estadio Azteca, Mexico City

Cruz Azul won 7-2 on aggregate.

27 April 1973

Atlético Español	3-4	Monterrey
Brandon 25'; Manzo 66'; Pardo 85'		Álvarez 10'; Milton Carlos 43', 46'; Bertocchi 51'

Estadio Azteca, Mexico City
4 May 1974

Monterrey	1-3	Atlético Español
Peña 35' (pen.)		Manzo 44'; Muñante 59'; Romahn 76'

Estadio Universitario, San Nicolás de los Garza

Atlético Español won 6-5 on aggregate.

== Final ==
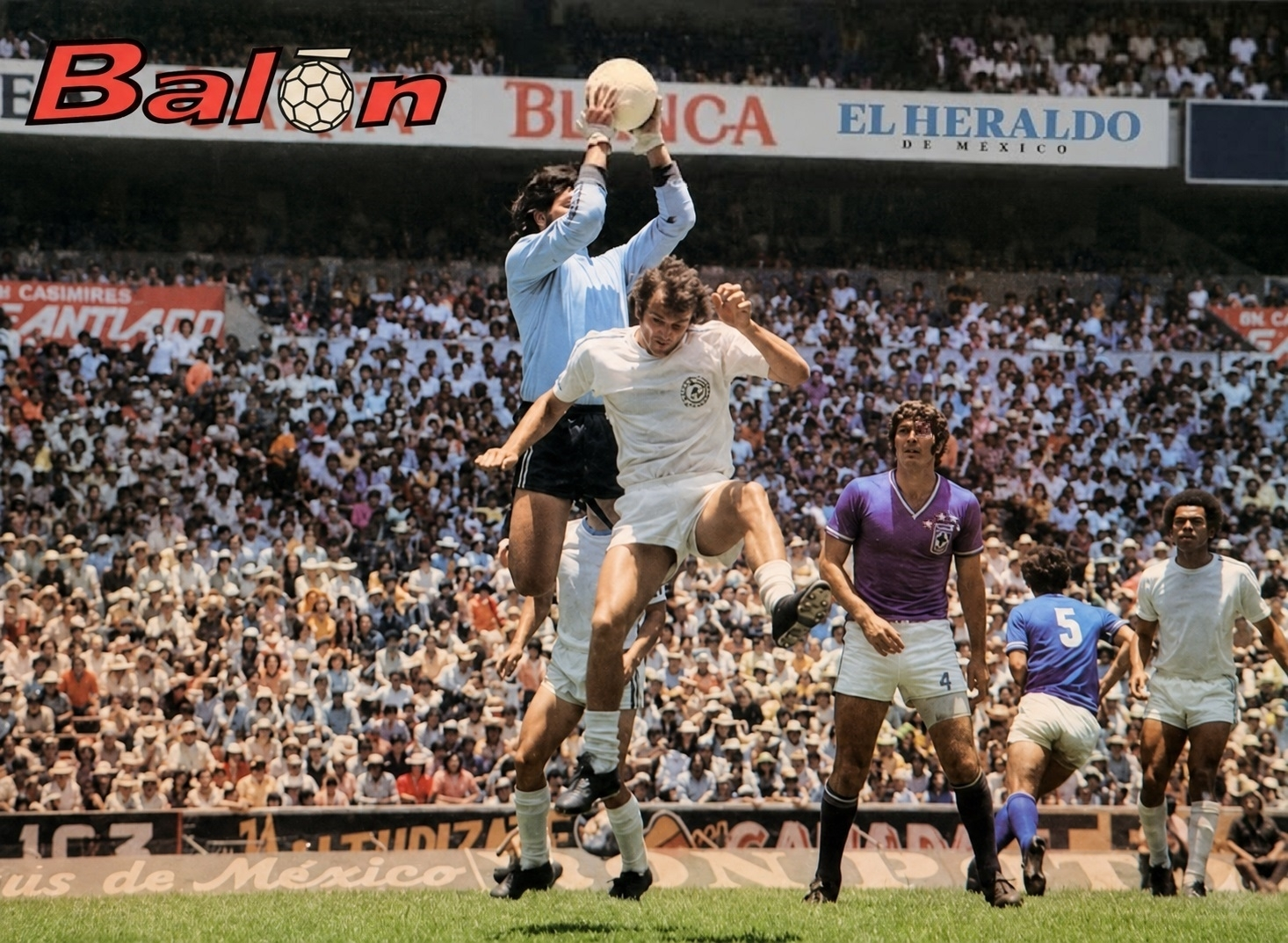
The second legged match with Miguel Marín blocking an attempted goal by Benito Pardo.

=== First leg ===
May 12, 1974

Atlético Español	2-1	Cruz Azul
Romahn; Brandon	Report	Vera 86'

Estadio Azteca, Mexico City

Atlético Español	Cruz Azul

GK	1	(Mexico) Enrique Vázquez
DF	2	(Mexico) Jaime García
DF	3	(Mexico) Juan Manuel Álvarez
DF	4	(Argentina) José Luis Trejo
DF	5	(Mexico) Jesús Rico
MF	10	(Mexico) Manuel Manzo
MF	6	(Chile) Juan Rodríguez Vega
FW	8	(Spain) Benito Pardo
FW	7	(Peru) Juan José Muñante	(substituted off) 76'
FW	9	(Uruguay) Ricardo Brandon
FW	11	(Mexico) Alejandro Romahn
Substitutes:
MF	14	(Mexico) Tomás Boy	(substituted on) 76'
Manager:
(Peru) Walter Ormeño

GK	1	(Argentina) Miguel Marín
DF	2	(Mexico) Ignacio Flores
DF	3	(Mexico) Javier Guzmán
DF	4	(Chile) Alberto Quintano
DF	5	(Mexico) Javier Sánchez Galindo
MF	6	(Mexico) Héctor Pulido (c)
MF	14	(Mexico) Luis Estrada
MF	8	(Argentina) Alberto Gómez
FW	9	(Mexico) Fernando Bustos
FW	10	(Mexico) Horacio López Salgado	(substituted off) 68'
FW	11	(Paraguay) Eladio Vera
Substitutes:
MF	7	(Mexico) Joel Andrade	(substituted on) 68'
Manager:
(Mexico) Raúl Cárdenas

=== Second leg ===
May 19, 1974

Cruz Azul	3-0	Atlético Español
López Salgado 13'; Bustos 70'; Flores	Report

Estadio Azteca, Mexico City
Referee: Abel Aguilar

Cruz Azul	Atlético Español

GK	1	(Argentina) Miguel Marín
DF	2	(Mexico) Ignacio Flores
DF	3	(Mexico) Javier Guzmán
DF	4	(Chile) Alberto Quintano
DF	5	(Mexico) Javier Sánchez Galindo
MF	6	(Mexico) Héctor Pulido (c)
MF	7	(Mexico) Joel Andrade
MF	8	(Argentina) Alberto Gómez
FW	9	(Mexico) Fernando Bustos	(substituted off) 78'
FW	10	(Mexico) Horacio López Salgado	(substituted off) 66'
FW	11	(Paraguay) Eladio Vera
Substitutes:
MF	14	(Mexico) Luis Estrada	(substituted on) 66'
MF	16	(Mexico) Pelón Gutiérrez	(substituted on) 78'
Manager:
(Mexico) Raúl Cárdenas

GK	1	(Mexico) Enrique Vázquez
DF	2	(Mexico) Jaime García
DF	3	(Mexico) Juan Manuel Álvarez
DF	4	(Argentina) José Luis Trejo
DF	5	(Mexico) Jesús Rico
MF	10	(Mexico) Manuel Manzo
MF	6	(Chile) Juan Rodríguez Vega
FW	8	(Spain) Benito Pardo
FW	7	(Peru) Juan José Muñante
FW	9	(Uruguay) Ricardo Brandon
FW	11	(Mexico) Alejandro Romahn	(substituted off) 69'
Substitutes:
MF	14	(Mexico) Tomás Boy	(substituted on) 69'
Manager:
(Peru) Walter Ormeño

Cruz Azul won 4-2 on aggregate.

1973–74 winners

5th title

== Top scorers ==
Player	Nationality	Goals	Club
Osvaldo Castro	Chile	24	América
Horacio López Salgado	Mexico	22	Cruz Azul
Milton Carlos	Brazil	22	Monterrey
Roberto Salomone	Argentina	18	León
Alcindo	Brazil	17	Jalisco
Ricardo Chavarín	Mexico	17	Atlas
Francisco Bertocchi	Uruguay	17	Monterrey
Juan Carlos Cárdenas	Argentina	16	Puebla
Alejandro Romahn	Mexico	15	Atlético Español
Ricardo Brandon	Uruguay	15	Atlético Español
Octavio Muciño	Mexico	15	Cruz Azul
