= El Súper Clásico (Mexico) =

Football rivalry in Mexico

- Other names: El Clásico; El Clásico de Clásicos; El Super Clásico; El Clásico Nacional
- Location: Mexico
- Teams: Club América; Guadalajara
- First meeting: Guadalajara 1–0 Club América; Copa México (29 July 1943)
- Latest meeting: Guadalajara 2–0 Club América (Friendly 4 October 2026)
- Next meeting: TBD
- Stadiums: Estadio Banorte (Club América); Estadio Akron (Guadalajara)

Statistics
- Total meetings: 263
- Most wins: Club América (99)
- Most player appearances: Juan Jasso; Cristóbal Ortega (50)
- Top scorer: Salvador Reyes (13)
- Largest victory: Club América 7–2 Guadalajara (20 February 1944); Guadalajara 7–0 Club América (22 August 1956)

| Club América | Guadalajara |

El Súper Clásico (The Super Classic), also known as El Clásico (The Classic), El Clásico de Clásicos (The Classic of Classics), and El Clásico Nacional (The National Classic), is an association football match between Mexican clubs Club América and Guadalajara. It is considered the biggest rivalry in Mexican football, and one of the biggest in world football. They are the most successful in Mexican football in terms of championships, with Club América winning 16 league titles and Guadalajara trailing them with 12. The clubs are identified by their respective histories, with Club América considered the club of the wealthy and establishment, while Guadalajara are known for exclusively fielding Mexican players, the only club in the country to do so. Both clubs are the league’s most supported, and are known for their extensive fan bases throughout North America.

It is the only derby in the world that has been showcased in two distinct continental tournaments, both the Copa Libertadores and the CONCACAF Champions Cup.

As of 14 February 2026, Club América leads the all-time head-to-head results between the two with 99 wins to Guadalajara's 82, with 82 matches ending in a draw.

== History ==
The first confrontation between what are considered the two most popular teams in Mexico ended with a victory for Guadalajara with a score of 1–0. The rivalry began to flourish after the second match, when Chivas defeated Club América with a score of 7–2 In the year of 1943. Although the huge defeat sparked embarrassment within the ranks of Club América, it was almost two decades before the rivalry became the Clásico that is known today. Initially, Club América was struggling in the Mexican League. Halfway through the 1957–58 tournament, Club América had only managed to win six points, placing them in last place in the overall standings. In danger of finishing lower in the standings, the club hired Fernando Marcos, a retired player and referee. By the 1958–59 tournament, Marcos had transformed the team into a contender for the title. Although Club América 's level rose, Chivas was playing tactical football that was giving them good results. After the 1957–1958 tournament, in which Club Zacatepec was crowned champions, Chivas managed to win a record six consecutive titles.

The late 1950s through the mid-1960s could be considered the best era in Chivas' history. During this time period, Chivas won the majority (7) of their eleven league titles, only interrupted twice in 1958 and 1963, by Zacatepec and Club Deportivo Oro respectively. Although Club América, or any other Mexican club for that matter, never achieved the same success in such a short period of time, an equally impressive feat is achieved much later by Club América.

Mexican football had drastically evolved by the 1980s. The period of football domination between two teams was certainly over. Although absolute parity is never achievable, competition was more evenly distributed throughout the football clubs competing in the México Primera División. The 1980s is perhaps the best decade in Club América's history. Up until then, no other club had managed the incredible success of Chivas. During this time period, Club América won five titles in the course of five years. First, starting in 1984, a series of three consecutive titles, followed by two consecutive titles starting in 1988. Club América achieved what no other team has achieved in present-era Mexican football. Despite consistency from both Chivas and Club América, after Club América's glorious years and long after Chivas' golden age, the two teams have only managed to win four titles between them, two apiece.

=== Riot of 1983 ===
In the second leg of the semi-finals of the 1982–83 season, players of both two teams sparked a brawl better known as "La Bronca del '83" ("The Riot of '83"), which resulted in Chivas going onto play Puebla in the final by eliminating Club América during that playoff.

The following season Club América would get to play Chivas once again in the 1983–1984 final in which Club América came from behind on aggregate to defeat Chivas, in to date the only league final disputed between the two teams.

In between the seasons of 1983 through the year 2000, Club América showed dominance over Chivas recording an impressive record of only 6 losses out of 43 matches against Chivas.

=== 2000s ===
One of the most memorable games played between Chivas and Club América during the Clausura 2005 tournament took place on 13 March in the Estadio Azteca. The game started with a goal by Pável Pardo at the 15th minute of the game. Club América would then attempt to solidify its hold on the game when, in the 38th minute, Óscar Rojas scored the second goal, capitalizing on a pass from Cuauhtémoc Blanco. During the 42nd minute of the game, with the first half about to conclude, Héctor Reynoso scored one of the most beautiful goals of his career, making the score 2–1. Francisco Palencia would score the 100th goal of his career in the 58th minute, tying the score 2–2. But Club América would again take the lead when, at the 78th minute, Pável Pardo made an excellent pass to Claudio López who didn't waste the opportunity to penetrate the gaping goal tended by Oswaldo Sánchez. However, things wouldn't end there. Three minutes before the game ended, Palencia would make his 101st goal as a result of a magnificent play involving Ramón Morales and Alberto Medina. The score was tied 3–3 although Chivas attempted yet another goal that came from Palencia.

In 2007, Club América set the record for most wins in a year by defeating Chivas four times.

In 2016, Club América and Guadalajara met a record seven times between league matches (including play-offs) and their semifinal Copa MX meeting. Club América came out ahead with a note-worthy record of three victories, two draws and two defeats. In the two playoff-round meetings, Club América went undefeated against Guadalajara, with a record of two victories and two draws.

== Overall statistics ==
=== Head-to-head ===
As of 14 September 2025

| Competition | GP | AV | D | GV | GoalA | GoalG |
|---|---|---|---|---|---|---|
| League | 164 | 52 | 55 | 57 | 202 | 217 |
| Playoffs | 30 | 17 | 6 | 7 | 35 | 23 |
| Copa México | 14 | 6 | 7 | 1 | 19 | 11 |
| Campeón de Campeones | 2 | 0 | 0 | 2 | 1 | 4 |
| CONCACAF Champions League | 6 | 3 | 1 | 2 | 13 | 6 |
| Copa Pre-Libertadores | 2 | 2 | 0 | 0 | 3 | 0 |
| Interliga | 1 | 0 | 1 | 0 | 1 | 1 |
| Copa Libertadores | 2 | 2 | 0 | 0 | 3 | 0 |
| Official competitions | 221 | 82 | 70 | 69 | 277 | 262 |
| Other tournaments and friendly matches | 41 | 17 | 12 | 12 | 68 | 53 |
| Total | 262 | 99 | 82 | 81 | 345 | 315 |

GP: Games Played
AV: Club América Victory
D: Draw
GV: Guadalajara Victory
GoalA: América Goals
GoalG: Guadalajara Goals

=== Guadalajara at home ===
| Date | Venue | Score | Competition |
|---|---|---|---|
| 17 August 1960 | Estadio Jalisco | 1-0 | Primera División de México |
| 29 November 1961 | Estadio Jalisco | 1-0 | Primera División de México |
| 8 July 1962 | Estadio Jalisco | 2–2 | Primera División de México |
| 22 September 1963 | Estadio Jalisco | 0–0 | Primera División de México |
| 20 June 1964 | Estadio Jalisco | 0–0 | Primera División de México |
| 22 July 1965 | Estadio Jalisco | 2-0 | Primera División de México |
| 15 January 1967 | Estadio Jalisco | 1–2 | Primera División de México |
| 10 September 1967 | Estadio Jalisco | 0–0 | Primera División de México |
| 16 November 1968 | Estadio Jalisco | 3-0 | Primera División de México |
| 10 April 1969 | Estadio Jalisco | 3-1 | Primera División de México |
| 5 June 1971 | Estadio Jalisco | 1–2 | Primera División de México |
| 18 December 1971 | Estadio Jalisco | 1–3 | Primera División de México |
| 17 March 1973 | Estadio Jalisco | 0–0 | Primera División de México |
| 6 April 1974 | Estadio Jalisco | 0–2 | Primera División de México |
| 6 April 1975 | Estadio Jalisco | 2–2 | Primera División de México |
| 3 December 1975 | Estadio Jalisco | 0–3 | Primera División de México |
| 13 March 1977 | Estadio Jalisco | 1-1 | Primera División de México |
| 22 November 1977 | Estadio Jalisco | 1–1 | Primera División de México |
| 21 October 1978 | Estadio Jalisco | 0–0 | Primera División de México |
| 14 October 1979 | Estadio Jalisco | 1–1 | Primera División de México |
| 17 May 1981 | Estadio Jalisco | 2-0 | Primera División de México |
| 6 December 1981 | Estadio Jalisco | 2-0 | Primera División de México |
| 3 December 1982 | Estadio Jalisco | 0–2 | Primera División de México |
| 12 September 1983 | Estadio Jalisco | 1–1 | Primera División de México |
| 24 March 1985 | Estadio Jalisco | 0–0 | Primera División de México |
| 11 January 1987 | Estadio Jalisco | 2–2 | Primera División de México |
| 15 May 1988 | Estadio Jalisco | 3-2 | Primera División de México |
| 29 December 1988 | Estadio Jalisco | 2–2 | Primera División de México |
| 24 September 1989 | Estadio Jalisco | 2–2 | Primera División de México |
| 9 December 1990 | Estadio Jalisco | 2–2 | Primera División de México |
| 19 January 1992 | Estadio Jalisco | 0–0 | Primera División de México |
| 26 August 1992 | Estadio Jalisco | 1-0 | Primera División de México |
| 5 September 1993 | Estadio Jalisco | 0–0 | Primera División de México |
| 14 November 1994 | Estadio Jalisco | 3–4 | Primera División de México |
| 22 October 1995 | Estadio Jalisco | 0-2 | Primera División de México |
| 25 August 1996 | Estadio Jalisco | 5-0 | Primera División de México |
| 12 August 1997 | Estadio Jalisco | 1–2 | Primera División de México |
| 20 September 1998 | Estadio Jalisco | 1-0 | Primera División de México |
| 14 February 2000 | Estadio Jalisco | 3-0 | Primera División de México |
| 14 February 2001 | Estadio Jalisco | 1-2 | Primera División de México |
| 21 October 2001 | Estadio Jalisco | 1-1 | Primera División de México |
| 12 August 2002 | Estadio Jalisco | 0-1 | Primera División de México |
| 4 May 2004 | Estadio Jalisco | 0-1 | Primera División de México |
| 2 October 2004 | Estadio Jalisco | 0-0 | Primera División de México |
| 26 February 2006 | Estadio Jalisco | 1-0 | Primera División de México |
| 28 September 2006 | Estadio Jalisco | 1-0 | Primera División de México |
| 13 April 2008 | Estadio Jalisco | 3-2 | Primera División de México |
| 17 April 2009 | Estadio Jalisco | 1-0 | Primera División de México |
| 4 April 2010 | Estadio Jalisco | 1-0 | Primera División de México |
| 10 April 2011 | Estadio Akron | 3-0 | Primera División de México |
| 8 April 2012 | Estadio Akron | 0-1 | Primera División de México |
| 31 March 2013 | Estadio Akron | 0–2 | Liga MX |
| 31 March 2014 | Estadio Akron | 0–4 | Liga MX |

=== Liguilla matches ===
| # | Date | Venue | Result | Competition |
|---|---|---|---|---|
| 1 | 1 June 1977 | Estadio Jalisco | Guadalajara, Club América 0-2 | 1976/77 Liguilla |
| 2 | 18 June 1977 | Estadio Azteca | Club América Guadalajara 1-1 | 1976/77 Liguilla |
| 3 | 19 May 1983 | Estadio Jalisco | Guadalajara, Club América 1–2 | 1982/83 Semi-final |
| 4 | 22 May 1983 | Estadio Azteca | Club América, Guadalajara 0–3 | 1982/83 Semi-final |
| 5 | 7 June 1984 | Estadio Jalisco | Guadalajara, Club América 2-2 | 1984/85 Final |
| 6 | 10 June 1984 | Estadio Azteca | Club América, Guadalajara 3–1 | 1984/85 Final |
| 7 | 9 May 1985 | Estadio Jalisco | Guadalajara, Club América 0–2 | 1984/85 Quarterfinal |
| 8 | 13 May 1985 | Estadio Azteca | Club América, Guadalajara 1–0 | 1984/85 Quarterfinal |
| 9 | 20 June 1989 | Estadio Azteca | Club América, Guadalajara 3-1 | 1988/89 Liguilla |
| 10 | 29 June 1989 | Estadio Jalisco | Guadalajara América 3–2 | 1988/89 Liguilla |
| 11 | 12 June 1991 | Estadio Jalisco | Guadalajara, Club América 0–2 | 1990/91 Semi-final |
| 12 | 15 June 1991 | Estadio Azteca | Club América, Guadalajara 3–0 | 1990/91 Semi-final |
| 13 | 18 November 1997 | Estadio Jalisco | Guadalajara, Club América 1-3 | Invierno 1997 Quarterfinal |
| 14 | 21 November 1997 | Estadio Azteca | Club América, Guadalajara 1-0 | Invierno 1997 Quarterfinal |
| 15 | 3 December 1999 | Estadio Jalisco | Guadalajara, Club América 0-0 | Invierno 1999 Quarterfinal |
| 16 | 5 December 1999 | Estadio Azteca | Club América, Guadalajara 1–0 | Invierno 1999 Quarterfinal |
| 17 | 30 November 2006 | Estadio Jalisco | Guadalajara América 2-0 | Apertura 2006 Quarterfinal |
| 18 | 3 December 2006 | Estadio Azteca | Club América, Guadalajara 0-0 | Apertura 2006 Quarterfinal |
| 19 | 17 May 2007 | Estadio Azteca | Club América, Guadalajara 1-0 | Clausura 2007 Semi-final |
| 20 | 20 May 2007 | Estadio Jalisco | Guadalajara, Club América 3-1 | Clausura 2007 Semi-final |
| 21 | 12 May 2016 | Estadio Akron | Guadalajara, Club America 0–0 | Clausura 2016 Quarterfinal |
| 22 | 15 May 2016 | Estadio Azteca | Club América, Guadalajara 2–1 | Clausura 2016 Quarterfinal |
| 23 | 24 November 2016 | Estadio Azteca | Club América, Guadalajara 1–1 | Apertura 2016 Quarterfinal |
| 24 | 27 November 2016 | Estadio Akron | Guadalajara, Club America 0–1 | Apertura 2016 Quarterfinal |
| 25 | 24 November 2020 | Estadio Akron | Guadalajara, Club America 1–0 | Apertura 2020 Quarterfinal |
| 26 | 29 November 2020 | Estadio Azteca | Club América, Guadalajara 1–2 | Apertura 2020 Quarterfinal |
| 27 | 17 May 2023 | Estadio Jalisco | Guadalajara, Club América 0–1 | Clausura 2023 Semifinal |
| 28 | 20 May 2023 | Estadio Azteca | Club América, Guadalajara 1–3 | Clausura 2023 Semifinal |

| Guadalajara wins | Club América wins | Draws |
|---|---|---|
| 6 | 15 | 5 |

== Refereeing ==
The record holders for matches refereeing the matches belonging to Marco Antonio Rodríguez and Armando Archundia with

- Marco Rodríguez (5)
- Armando Archundia (4)
- German Arredondo (3)
- Mauricio Morales (2)
- Francisco Chacon (2)
- Gilberto Alcala (2)
- Erim Ramirez Ulloa (2)
- Fernando Guerrero Ramirez (2)
- Paul Delgadillo (1)
- Hugo Guajardo (1)
- Jorge Antonio Perez Duran (1)
- Jose Alfredo Penaloza Soto (1)
- Cesar Arturo Ramos Palazuelos (1)

== Players that played for both teams ==
A listing of the many footballers who have played for both Guadalajara and Club America :

Note: On May 26, 2013, Francisco Javier Rodriguez became the first player ever in the history of Mexican football to champion with both teams. First having championed with Chivas on December 10, 2006. On December 17, 2023, Alejandro Zendejas became the second player in history to champion with both teams. First having championed with Chivas on May 28, 2017. Rodolfo Cota became the third player in the rivalry's history to champion with both clubs, first with Chivas in May 2017 and with Club América on December 15, 2024.

(*) Indicates that player has championed with both clubs

(Mexico) Salvador Mota – with Club América: 1942–1944 / with Guadalajara: 1944–48 ?

(Mexico) Carlos Iturralde – with Guadalajara: 1950–1951 / with America: 1952–1956

(Mexico) Eduardo Garduño – with Club América: 1947–1949 / with Guadalajara: 1954–1955

(Mexico) Raul Cardenas – with Club América: 1959–1960 / with Guadalajara: 1967–1968

(Mexico) Ramiro Navarro – with Guadalajara: 1965–1968 / with Club América: 1968–69

(Mexico) Sergio Ceballos – with Club América: 1968–1974 / with Guadalajara: 1976–1977

(Mexico) Enrique Vázquez del Mercado – with Guadalajara: 1969–1972 / with Club América: 1969–1970

(Mexico) Ruben Cardenas – with Club América: 1970–1973 / with Guadalajara: 1974–1980

(Mexico) Antonio Zamora – with Club América: 1970–1973 / with Guadalajara: 1975–1978

(Mexico) Francisco Macedo – with Club América: 1971–1973 / with Guadalajara: 1973–1974

(Mexico) Albino Morales – with Club América: 1972–1973 / with Guadalajara: 1973–74

(Mexico) Javier Sánchez Galindo – with Guadalajara: 1974–1975 / with Club América: 1975–1979

(Mexico) Javier Cárdenas – with Club América: 1978–1979 / with Guadalajara: 1979–1985

(Mexico) Javier Aguirre – with Club América: 1979–1984 / with Guadalajara: 1987–1993

(Mexico) Carlos Hermosillo – with Club América: 1st run in 1983–1989, 2nd run in 1999–2000 / with Guadalajara: 2001

(Mexico) Ricardo Peláez – with Club América: 1st run in 1985–1987, 2nd run in 1997–1998 / with Guadalajara: 1998–2000

(Mexico) Luis Manuel Díaz – with Guadalajara: 1983–1987 / with Club América: 1991–1992

(Mexico) Pedro Pineda – with Guadalajara: 1991–1992 / with Club América: 1st run in 1992–1995, 2nd run in 1996–1997

(Mexico) Gerardo Silva – with Guadalajara: 1990–1993 / with Club América: 1993–1994

(Mexico) Luis García – with Club América: 1995–1997 / with Guadalajara: 1998–1999

(Mexico) Oswaldo Sánchez – with Club América: 1996–1999 / with Guadalajara: 1999–2006

(Mexico) Ignacio Hierro – with Club América: 1997–1999 / with Guadalajara: 1999–2000

(Mexico) Damián Álvarez – with Guadalajara: 1998 / with Club América: 1998–2000

(Mexico) Gustavo Napoles – with Guadalajara: 1st run 1995–1998, 2nd run 2000–2002 / with Club América: 1999

(Mexico) Ramón Ramírez – with Guadalajara: 1st run 1994–1998, 2nd run 2002–2004 / with Club América: 1999

(Mexico) Joel Sánchez – with Guadalajara: 1st run 1993–1999, 2nd run 2001–2003 / with Club América: 1999–2000

(Mexico) Jesús Mendoza – with Guadalajara: 1999–2000 / with Club América: 1st run 2000–2002, 2nd run 2003–2005

(Mexico) Manuel Rios – with Guadalajara: 1998–2000 / with Club América: 2002

(Mexico) Alejandro Nava – with Guadalajara: 1st run 2000, 2nd run 2001–2002 / with Club América: 2002

(Mexico) Alvaro Ortiz – with Guadalajara: 1999–2000 / with Club América: 2002–2005

(Mexico) Christian Ramírez – with Club América: 2003–2004 / with Guadalajara: 2005–2006

(Mexico) Oribe Peralta – with Guadalajara: 2005 (loan), 2019–2021 / with Club América: 2014–2019

(Mexico) Edoardo Isella – with Guadalajara: 2000–2001 / with Club América: 2008

(Mexico) Luis Alonso Sandoval – with Guadalajara: 2002–2005 / with Club América: 2010

(Mexico) Luis Ernesto Perez – with Club América: 2007 (loan) / with Guadalajara: 2012–2016

(Mexico) Rafael Marquez Lugo – with Club América: 2008 / with Guadalajara: 2012–2015

(Mexico) Francisco Javier Rodriguez – with Guadalajara: 2002–2008 * / with Club América: 2013–2014 *

(Mexico) Ángel Reyna – with Club América: 2009–2011 / with Guadalajara: 2014–2015

(Mexico) Alberto García Carpizo – with Guadalajara: 2014–2015 / with Club América: 2015

(Mexico) Jesús Molina – with Club América: 2011–2014 / with Guadalajara: 2019-2022

(Mexico) Fernando Rubén González – with Guadalajara: 2013–2015 / with Club América: 2019–2020

(Mexico) José Madueña – with Club América: 2014-2015 / with Guadalajara: 2020

(Mexico) (United States) Alejandro Zendejas - with Guadalajara: 2016–2018 * / with Club América: 2022– ***

(Mexico) Ricardo Marín - with Club América: 2017–2021 / with Guadalajara: 2023–

(Mexico) Cristian Calderón - with Guadalajara: 2020-2023 / with Club América: 2024–2026

(Mexico) Bruce El-mesmari – Club América (2023-2024), Guadalajara (2024–present)

(Mexico) Rodolfo Cota – Guadalajara (2015–2018) *, Club América (2024–present) *

(Mexico) Alan Cervantes – Guadalajara (2017–2020), Club América (2024–present)

Other special notes ** In the cases of Oribe Peralta and Luis Ernesto Perez, Peralta then a player of CF Monterrey was out on loan to Guadalajara for the 2005 edition of the Copa Libertadores playing in four matches. He did not score a single goal. In May 2014, Peralta was transferred from Santos Laguna to Club América. The same happened with Luis Ernesto Perez in 2007, Perez was then a player for CF Monterrey but was loaned to Club América for that year's edition of the Copa Libertadores.

In the case of Ángel Reyna, Reyna was suspended from Chivas' A squad in September 2015 due to disputes. With the firing of Jose Manuel de la Torre of whom Reyna had feuded with for some time and with the coming of Matias Almeyda, Reyna was left out of training sessions and coming matches. Reyna's contract with Chivas was officially terminated on March 9, 2016.

== Managers ==
Several managers have led on both squads. Walter Ormeño and Oscar Ruggeri played for Club América and later managed rival Guadalajara. Luis Fernando Tena served Guadalajara as player in 1983 and later managed Club América in 2006-07. He then replaces Tomás Boy at Guadalajara in September 2019. Ricardo La Volpe (**) is the only manager to have served both squads in more than one occasion. Ignacio Ambríz became the first Mexican manager to lead in both.

(Hungary) György Orth – Guadalajara (1946–1949); América (1950–1951)

(Peru) Walter Ormeño – Club América (1969–1970); Guadalajara (1972–1973)

(Argentina) Miguel Ángel López – Club América (1984–1987 & 1992–1993); Guadalajara (1989–1991)

(Uruguay) Carlos Miloc – Guadalajara (1979–1980); Club América (1991)

(Argentina) Ricardo La Volpe ** – Guadalajara (1989 & 2014); Club América (1996 & 2016–2017)

(Netherlands) Leo Beenhakker – Club América (1994–1995 & 2003–2004); Guadalajara (1996)

(Argentina) Oscar Ruggeri – Guadalajara (2001–2002); Club América (2004)

(Mexico) Ignacio Ambríz – Guadalajara (2012); Club América (2015–2016)

(Mexico) Luis Fernando Tena - Club América (2006-2007); Guadalajara (2019-2020)
