= Jesús Rico =

Jesús Rico can refer to:

- Jesús Rico (footballer) (1953–2026), Mexican footballer
- Jesús Rico (sprinter) (born 1950), Venezuelan sprinter
