= 2019–20 Liga de Ascenso =

Segunda División de Costa Rica
- Season: 2019–20
- Champions: Apertura: Sporting San José; Clausura: [N/A]

The 2019–20 Liga de Ascenso season is the 99th season since its establishment. The tournament is divided into two championships, the Apertura and Clausura, each in an identical format and each contested by 12 teams.

== Teams ==
A total of 18 teams compete in the 2019–20 Liga de Ascenso and separate into two Groups of 9 with the top four progressing to the final stages of the Apertura and Clausura sections.

== Apertura ==
=== Regular season ===
==== Group A ====
| Pos | Team | Pld | W | D | L | GF | GA | GD | Pts | |
|---|---|---|---|---|---|---|---|---|---|---|
| 1 | Carmelita | 16 | 9 | 4 | 3 | 37 | 20 | +17 | 31 | Advance to Apertura Quarterfinals |
| 2 | Barrio México | 16 | 8 | 3 | 5 | 28 | 19 | +9 | 27 | Advance to Apertura Quarterfinals |
| 3 | Rosario | 16 | 8 | 3 | 5 | 25 | 21 | +4 | 27 | Advance to Apertura Quarterfinals |
| 4 | Cofutpa | 16 | 7 | 5 | 4 | 29 | 24 | +5 | 26 | Advance to Apertura Quarterfinals |
| 5 | Municipal Liberia | 16 | 5 | 6 | 5 | 19 | 20 | −1 | 21 | |
| 6 | Guanacasteca | 16 | 5 | 4 | 7 | 22 | 29 | −7 | 19 | |
| 7 | Puntarenas | 16 | 4 | 5 | 7 | 24 | 22 | +2 | 17 | |
| 8 | Cartagena | 16 | 5 | 1 | 10 | 21 | 40 | −19 | 16 | |
| 9 | Santa Rosa | 16 | 3 | 5 | 8 | 15 | 25 | −10 | 14 | |

Source: Soccerway
Rules for classification: 1) points; 2) goal difference; 3) goals scored; 4) head-to-head points; 5) head-to-head goal difference; 6) head-to-head goals scored; 7) draw

==== Group B ====
| Pos | Team | Pld | W | D | L | GF | GA | GD | Pts | |
|---|---|---|---|---|---|---|---|---|---|---|
| 1 | Escazuceña | 16 | 10 | 3 | 3 | 32 | 18 | +14 | 33 | Advance to Apertura Quarterfinals |
| 2 | Sporting San José | 16 | 9 | 3 | 4 | 28 | 17 | +11 | 30 | Advance to Apertura Quarterfinals |
| 3 | Puerto Golfito | 16 | 7 | 5 | 4 | 25 | 16 | +9 | 26 | Advance to Apertura Quarterfinals |
| 4 | Municipal Garabito | 16 | 7 | 5 | 4 | 19 | 18 | +1 | 26 | Advance to Apertura Quarterfinals |
| 5 | Uruguay de Coronado | 16 | 7 | 3 | 6 | 22 | 24 | −2 | 24 | |
| 6 | Santa Ana | 16 | 5 | 4 | 7 | 22 | 31 | −9 | 19 | |
| 7 | Curridabat | 16 | 5 | 3 | 8 | 29 | 32 | −3 | 18 | |
| 8 | Consultants Moravia | 16 | 2 | 6 | 8 | 18 | 26 | −8 | 12 | |
| 9 | Turrialba | 16 | 3 | 2 | 11 | 15 | 28 | −13 | 11 | |

Source: Soccerway
Rules for classification: 1) points; 2) goal difference; 3) goals scored; 4) head-to-head points; 5) head-to-head goal difference; 6) head-to-head goals scored; 7) draw

=== Playoffs ===
==== Quarterfinals ====
| Team 1 | Agg. | Team 2 | 1st leg | 2nd leg |
|---|---|---|---|---|
| Barrio México (A2) | 4–5 | Escazuceña (B1) | 3–2 | 1–3 (a.e.t.) |
| Municipal Garabito (B4) | 2–1 | Carmelita (A1) | 1–0 | 1–1 |
| Puerto Golfito (B3) | 2–1 | Rosario (A3) | 2–1 | 0–0 |
| Sporting San José (B2) | 5–4 | Cofutpa (A4) | 2–3 | 3–1 |

==== Semifinals ====
| Team 1 | Agg. | Team 2 | 1st leg | 2nd leg |
|---|---|---|---|---|
| Puerto Golfito (B3) | 3–1 | Escazuceña (B1) | 1–1 | 2–0 |
| Sporting San José (B2) | 3–1 | Municipal Garabito (B4) | 1–0 | 2–1 |

==== Final ====
| Team 1 | Agg. | Team 2 | 1st leg | 2nd leg |
|---|---|---|---|---|
| Puerto Golfito (B3) | 3–4 | Sporting San José (B2) | 2–1 | 1–3 (a.e.t.) |

== Clausura ==
=== Regular season ===
==== Group A ====
| Pos | Team | Pld | W | D | L | GF | GA | GD | Pts | |
|---|---|---|---|---|---|---|---|---|---|---|
| 1 | Puntarenas | 12 | 6 | 4 | 2 | 19 | 10 | +9 | 22 | Advance to Clausura Quarterfinals |
| 2 | Guanacasteca | 11 | 6 | 3 | 2 | 18 | 13 | +5 | 21 | Advance to Clausura Quarterfinals |
| 3 | Barrio México | 11 | 4 | 6 | 1 | 20 | 13 | +7 | 18 | Advance to Clausura Quarterfinals |
| 4 | Carmelita | 12 | 4 | 5 | 3 | 14 | 16 | −2 | 17 | Advance to Clausura Quarterfinals |
| 5 | Cartagena | 12 | 3 | 7 | 2 | 23 | 19 | +4 | 16 | |
| 6 | Cofutpa | 12 | 4 | 4 | 4 | 10 | 11 | −1 | 16 | |
| 7 | Rosario | 12 | 2 | 5 | 5 | 12 | 17 | −5 | 11 | |
| 8 | Santa Rosa | 11 | 0 | 7 | 4 | 11 | 16 | −5 | 7 | |
| 9 | Municipal Liberia | 11 | 1 | 3 | 7 | 11 | 23 | −12 | 6 | |

Source: Soccerway
Rules for classification: 1) points; 2) goal difference; 3) goals scored; 4) head-to-head points; 5) head-to-head goal difference; 6) head-to-head goals scored; 7) draw

==== Group B ====
| Pos | Team | Pld | W | D | L | GF | GA | GD | Pts | |
|---|---|---|---|---|---|---|---|---|---|---|
| 1 | Sporting San José | 12 | 7 | 2 | 3 | 19 | 13 | +6 | 23 | Advance to Clausura Quarterfinals |
| 2 | Escazuceña | 11 | 6 | 3 | 2 | 17 | 12 | +5 | 21 | Advance to Clausura Quarterfinals |
| 3 | Uruguay de Coronado | 11 | 5 | 4 | 2 | 17 | 11 | +6 | 19 | Advance to Clausura Quarterfinals |
| 4 | Consultants Moravia | 12 | 6 | 1 | 5 | 21 | 20 | +1 | 19 | Advance to Clausura Quarterfinals |
| 5 | Santa Ana | 11 | 4 | 3 | 4 | 24 | 22 | +2 | 15 | |
| 6 | Turrialba | 11 | 4 | 2 | 5 | 15 | 15 | 0 | 14 | |
| 7 | Puerto Golfito | 12 | 3 | 3 | 6 | 14 | 16 | −2 | 12 | |
| 8 | Municipal Garabito | 12 | 1 | 8 | 3 | 8 | 11 | −3 | 11 | |
| 9 | Curridabat | 12 | 0 | 6 | 6 | 11 | 26 | −15 | 6 | |

Source: Soccerway
Rules for classification: 1) points; 2) goal difference; 3) goals scored; 4) head-to-head points; 5) head-to-head goal difference; 6) head-to-head goals scored; 7) draw

=== Playoffs ===
==== Quarterfinals ====
| Team 1 | Agg. | Team 2 | 1st leg | 2nd leg |
|---|---|---|---|---|
| Barrio México (A3) | 1–1 (3–4 p) | Escazuceña (B2) | 0–1 | 1–0 |
| Carmelita (A4) | 1–2 | Sporting San José (B1) | 0–0 | 1–2 |
| Consultants Moravia (B4) | 4–2 | Puntarenas (A1) | 2–1 | 2–1 |
| Uruguay de Coronado (B3) | 3–4 | Guanacasteca (A2) | 1–4 | 2–0 |

==== Semifinals ====
| Team 1 | Agg. | Team 2 | 1st leg | 2nd leg |
|---|---|---|---|---|
| Consultants Moravia (B4) | 2–2 (1–4 p) | Escazuceña (B2) | 1–1 | 1–1 |
| Guanacasteca (A2) | 0–6 | Sporting San José (B1) | 0–1 | 0–5 |

==== Final ====
| Team 1 | Agg. | Team 2 | 1st leg | 2nd leg |
|---|---|---|---|---|
| Escazuceña (B2) | 4–2 | Sporting San José (B1) | 2–1 | 2–1 |

== Aggregate table ==
| Pos | Team | Pld | W | D | L | GF | GA | GD | Pts | |
|---|---|---|---|---|---|---|---|---|---|---|
| 1 | Escazuceña | 27 | 16 | 6 | 5 | 49 | 30 | +19 | 54 | |
| 2 | Sporting San José | 28 | 16 | 5 | 7 | 47 | 30 | +17 | 53 | |
| 3 | Carmelita | 28 | 13 | 9 | 6 | 51 | 36 | +15 | 48 | |
| 4 | Barrio México | 27 | 12 | 9 | 6 | 48 | 32 | +16 | 45 | |
| 5 | Uruguay de Coronado | 27 | 12 | 7 | 8 | 39 | 35 | +4 | 43 | |
| 6 | Cofutpa | 28 | 11 | 9 | 8 | 39 | 35 | +4 | 42 | |
| 7 | Guanacasteca | 27 | 11 | 7 | 9 | 40 | 42 | −2 | 40 | |
| 8 | Puntarenas | 28 | 10 | 9 | 9 | 43 | 32 | +11 | 39 | |
| 9 | Puerto Golfito | 28 | 10 | 8 | 10 | 39 | 32 | +7 | 38 | |
| 10 | Rosario | 28 | 10 | 8 | 10 | 37 | 38 | −1 | 38 | |
| 11 | Municipal Garabito | 28 | 8 | 13 | 7 | 27 | 29 | −2 | 37 | |
| 12 | Santa Ana | 27 | 9 | 7 | 11 | 46 | 53 | −7 | 34 | |
| 13 | Cartagena | 28 | 8 | 8 | 12 | 44 | 59 | −15 | 32 | |
| 14 | Consultants Moravia | 28 | 8 | 7 | 13 | 39 | 46 | −7 | 31 | |
| 15 | Municipal Liberia | 27 | 6 | 9 | 12 | 30 | 43 | −13 | 27 | |
| 16 | Turrialba | 27 | 7 | 4 | 16 | 30 | 43 | −13 | 25 | |
| 17 | Curridabat | 28 | 5 | 9 | 14 | 40 | 58 | −18 | 24 | Advance to Relegation playoffs |
| 18 | Santa Rosa | 27 | 3 | 12 | 12 | 26 | 41 | −15 | 21 | Advance to Relegation playoffs |

Source: Soccerway

== Relegation playoffs ==
| Team 1 | Agg. | Team 2 | 1st leg | 2nd leg |
|---|---|---|---|---|
| Santa Rosa | 2–3 | Curridabat | 1–1 | 1–2 |
