= César Hines =

Costa Rican footballer (born 1958)

Personal information
- Full name: César Antonio Hines Céspedes
- Date of birth: July 13, 1958 (age 68)
- Place of birth: Limón, Costa Rica
- Position: Defender

Senior career*
Years	Team	Apps	(Gls)
1977–1981	Limonense		
- Herediano
- Sagrada Familia
- Alajuelense
- Saprissa
- Curridabat

International career
1983–1985	Costa Rica	14	
- * Club domestic league appearances and goals

César Antonio Hines Céspedes (born 13 July 1958, in Limón) is a retired Costa Rican professional footballer, who played for several clubs in Costa Rica.

Captain of the national team several times, known for his powerful presence in defense and his skillfully way to kick. Called El Kaiser in reference of Franz Beckenbauer nickname.

== Club career ==
Hines played for Limonense, Herediano, Sagrada Familia, Alajuelense, Saprissa and Curridabat.

== International career ==
Hines made 14 appearances for the full Costa Rica national football team from 1983 to 1985, making his debut in a 1–0 victory over Guatemala on 22 October 1983. He also played at the 1984 Olympic Games. In which Costa Rica beat 1982 FIFA World Cup champions Italy 1-0 against all odds.

== Retirement and personal life ==
Hines' early retirement was in order to achieve his other career, law. He studied law at the University of Costa Rica. At present he has a PhD in law.

His daughter Mijal plays for Costa Rica's national volleyball team.
