= 1980–81 Tampa Bay Rowdies indoor season =

Tampa Bay Rowdies
1980–81 indoor season
- Owner: (United States) George Strawbridge, Jr.
- General manager: (United States) Chas Serednesky, Jr
- Manager: (England) Gordon Jago
- Stadium: Bayfront Center
- NASL: Division: 2nd Playoffs: none
- Top goalscorer: (Chile) Óscar Fabbiani (31 goals)
- Highest home attendance: 5,545 (4 times)
- Lowest home attendance: 4,203 (Feb. 11 vs. Kicks)
- Average home league attendance: 5,163
Home colors	Away colors

The 1980–81 Tampa Bay Rowdies indoor season was the seventh indoor season of the club's existence.

== Overview ==
The 1980–81 indoor season was the Tampa Bay Rowdies' seventh season of existence, and their seventh season of indoor play. As in previous years, all home games were played at the Bayfront Center in St. Petersburg, Florida. The Rowdies entered the season as the defending indoor champions. They finished the season second in the Eastern Division with a 9–9 record, but failed to qualify for the playoffs. Óscar Fabbiani led the club with 31 goals and 77 points, while Steve Wegerle was the team's assist leader with 20. For the first time in club history the Tampa Bay Rowdies did not qualify for the playoffs.

== Club ==
=== Roster ===
No.	Position	Nation	Player
1	GK	USA	Winston DuBose
3	DF	SCO	John Gorman
4	DF	YUG	Refik Kozić
5	MF	NED	Jan van der Veen (capt.)
6	DF	RSA	Mike Connell
7	FW	RSA	Steve Wegerle
8	MF	CAN	Wes McLeod
11	MF	USA	Dave Taber
12	MF	USA	Perry Van der Beck
14	DF	USA	Peter Chandler
16	DF	ENG	Farrukh Quraishi
17	DF	USA	Paul Mott
18	FW	URU	Washington Olivera
19	MF	RSA	Neill Roberts
20	FW	CHI	Óscar Fabbiani
21	DF	ENG	Manny Andruszewski
22	GK	USA	Kevin Clinton
24	GK	USA	Tim Hanley
—	FW	ENG	Keith Peacock*

*emergency player

=== Management and technical staff ===
- (United States) George W. Strawbridge, Jr., owner
- (United States) Chas Serednesky, Jr., general manager
- (England) Gordon Jago, head coach
- (England) Keith Peacock, assistant coach
- (United States) Ken Shields, trainer
- (United States) Alfredo Beronda, equipment manager

=== Honors ===
==== Individual honors ====
- East Region All-Star: Steve Wegerle

== Regular season ==
=== Final standings ===
W = Wins, L = Losses, GB = Games Behind 1st Place, % = Winning Percentage, GF = Goals For, GA = Goals Against

Eastern Division	W	L	GB	%	GF	GA
Atlanta Chiefs	13	5	–	.722	97	76
Tampa Bay Rowdies	9	9	4	.500	126	120
Jacksonville Tea Men	8	10	5	.444	96	104
Fort Lauderdale Strikers	1	17	12	.056	58	125

=== Results ===
Date	Opponent	Venue	Result	Attendance	Scorers
November 21, 1980	Atlanta Chiefs	A	8–7	8,619	Wegerle (4), Fabbiani, Quraishi, Gorman
November 30, 1980	Detroit Express	A	5–8	5,387	Roberts (3), Olivera (2), Fabbiani, Gorman, Van der Veen
December 6, 1980	Chicago Sting	H	12–11(OT)	5,545	Olivera (4), Van der Veen (3), Fabbiani (2), Roberts (2), Wegerle
December 12, 1980	Minnesota Kicks	A	7–4	5,061	McLeod (2), Van der Veen, Wegerle
December 13, 1980	Atlanta Chiefs	H	2–6	5,032	Kozić, Wegerle
December 17, 1980	Jacksonville Tea Men	A	9–7	2,132	Fabbiani (3), Wegerle (3), Olivera, Van der Veen
December 19, 1980	Fort Lauderdale Strikers	A	5–12	1,673	Fabbiani (4), McLeod (3), Roberts (2), Olivera, Kozić, Wegerle
December 23, 1980	Fort Lauderdale Strikers	H	7–4	5,063	Fabbiani (4), Wegerle (2), McLeod
December 26, 1980	Chicago Sting	A	9–5	6,104	Fabbiani (2), Kozić, Olivera, Wegerle
January 3, 1981	Detroit Express	H	7–6(OT)	5,545	Wegerle (3), Gorman (2), Andruszewski, Fabbiani
January 10, 1981	Atlanta Chiefs	A	5–4(OT)	9,773	Van der Veen (2), McLeod, Wegerle
January 17, 1981	Jacksonville Tea Men	H	4–3	5,545	Fabbiani (2), Van der Veen, Taber
January 23, 1981	Jacksonville Tea Men	A	7–8(OT)	4,011	McLeod (3), Fabbiani (2), Connell, Taber, Gorman
January 27, 1981	Atlanta Chiefs	H	10–5	4,540	McLeod (3), Wegerle (2), Olivera, Taber, Van der Veen, Gorman, Mott
January 31, 1981	Jacksonville Tea Men	H	9–10(OT)	5,545	Fabbiani (3), Wegerle (2), Andruszewski, Olivera, Taber, McLeod
February 7, 1981	Fort Lauderdale Strikers	H	7–4	5,545	Fabbiani (4), McLeod (3)
February 11, 1981	Minnesota Kicks	H	6–8	4,203	McLeod (2), Wegerle (2), Van der Veen, Fabbiani
February 12, 1981	Fort Lauderdale Strikers	A	8–7(OT)	1,688	McLeod (2), Van der Veen (2), Wegerle, Olivera, Fabbiani

== Statistics ==
=== Season scoring ===
GP = Games Played, G = Goals (worth 2 points), A = Assists (worth 1 point), Pts = Points

Player	GP	G	A	Pts
Óscar Fabbiani	16	31	15	77
Steve Wegerle	18	25	20	70
Wes McLeod	15	21	10	52
Washington Olivera	14	12	19	43
Jan van der Veen	18	12	18	42
John Gorman	18	6	11	23
Neill Roberts	8	7	4	18
Refik Kozić	16	3	7	13
Mike Connell	18	1	10	12
Dave Taber	15	4	3	11
Manny Andruszewski	13	2	3	7
Paul Mott	13	1	1	3
Farrukh Quraishi	1	1	0	2
Peter Chandler	13	0	2	2
Winston DuBose	9	0	2	2
Kevin Clinton	5	0	2	2
Tim Hanley	5	0	0	0
Keith Peacock	2	0	0	0
Perry Van der Beck	0	0	0	0

=== Season goalkeeping ===
Note: GP = Games played; Min = Minutes played; GA = Goals against; GAA = Goals against average; W = Wins; L = Losses

Player	GP	Min	Svs	GA	GAA	W	L
Winston DuBose	9	552	120	56	6.09	5	4
Tim Hanley	5	270	80	30	6.67	2	3
Kevin Clinton	5	271	94	34	7.53	2	2

== Player movement ==
=== In ===
No.	Pos.	Player	Transferred from	Fee/notes	Date	Source
24	GK	(United States) Tim Hanley	none	former Foothill College player	November 1980	

=== Out ===
No.	Pos.	Player	Transferred to	Fee/notes	Date	Source
16	DF	(England) Farrukh Quraishi	(Canada) Calgary Boomers	Left club to accept player/manager position	November 25, 1980	
15	MF	(Socialist Federal Republic of Yugoslavia) Petar Baralić	(United States) Detroit Express	Traded for future draft considerations	December 5, 1980	
9	MF	(England) Peter Anderson	(England) Millwall F.C.	Accepted player/manager position	December 15, 1980	

== See also ==
- 1980–81 NASL Indoor season
- 1981 in American soccer
- Tampa Bay Rowdies (1975–1993)
