= Nilton Nóbrega =

Costa Rican association footballer

Personal information
- Full name: Nilton Nóbrega Pontes
- Date of birth: 24 December 1955 (age 70)
- Place of birth: Rio de Janeiro, Brazil
- Height: 1.75 m (5 ft 9 in)
- Position: Forward

Senior career*
| Years | Team | Apps | (Gls) |
| 1975–1977 | América-RN | | |
| 1978–1985 | Herediano | | |
| 1986–1989 | Saprissa | | |
- UCR
- Curridabat

International career
| 1985 | Costa Rica | 7 | (1) |
- * Club domestic league appearances and goals

Nilton Nóbrega Pontes (born 24 December 1955) is a Brazilian-Costa Rican former footballer who last played as a striker for Saprissa.

== Playing career ==
Nóbrega started his career with Brazilian side América-RN. In 1978, he signed for Costa Rican side Herediano, helping the club win four league titles. Eight years later, he signed for Costa Rican side Saprissa, helping the club win two league titles. Subsequently, he played for Costa Rican sides UCR and Curridabat before retiring from playing professional football.

== Personal life ==
Nóbrega was born on 24 December 1955 in Rio de Janeiro, Brazil and is a naturalized Costa Rican citizen. He has been married and has two children and a grandson. After retiring from playing football, he worked as a youth football manager and lived in Heredia Province.
