= Roger Flores =

Roger Flores may refer to:

- Róger Flores (Costa Rican footballer) (born 1959), Costa Rican football midfielder turned manager
- Roger Flores (Brazilian footballer) (born 1978), Brazilian football attacking midfielder turned pundit
