= Henry McCully =

Scottish-American soccer player and coach

Personal information
- Date of birth: April 30, 1948 (age 78)
- Place of birth: Motherwell, Scotland
- Height: 6 ft 0 in (1.83 m)
- Position: Forward

Senior career*
Years	Team	Apps	(Gls)
1973	New York Cosmos	8	(0)
1974	Rhode Island Oceaneers		
1975–1976	Hartford Bicentennials	37	(6)
1977	Connecticut Bicentennials	17	(0)
1978–1979	Memphis Rogues	49	(9)
1979–1980	Hartford Hellions (indoor)	18	(0)

International career
1975	United States	2	(1)

Managerial career
- Southern Connecticut Fighting Owls (assistant)
- * Club domestic league appearances and goals

Henry McCully (born April 30, 1948) is a retired Scottish-American soccer forward. A native of Scotland, McCully spent most of his career in the New England area of the United States. He earned two caps, scoring one goal, with the United States in 1975.

== Player ==
=== Professional ===
McCully played with the Hartford Italian-American Stars of the National Soccer League of Connecticut for three seasons. In 1967, the Stars won the league title, then went on to win the U.S. Amateur Cup. In 1973, the New York Cosmos of the North American Soccer League signed McCully. He played eight games, scoring no goals that season. The next season, he moved to the Rhode Island Oceaneers of the American Soccer League. That season, the Oceaneers took the ASL title with a win over the New York Apollo. The next year, McCully was back in the NASL, this time with the Hartford Bicentennials. He spent the 1975 and 1976 seasons in Hartford, playing thirty-seven games and scoring six goals. The team renamed itself the Connecticut Bicentennials in 1977. That season, McCully scored no goals in seventeen games. At the end of the 1977 season, the team moved to Oakland, California. McCully did not make that move, but instead moved to the Memphis Rogues for the 1978 and 1979 seasons. He played in forty-nine games, scoring nine goals. At the end of the 1979 NASL season, McCully left the NASL and made one final move, to the Hartford Hellions of Major Indoor Soccer League (MISL) for the 1979–1980 season. At the end of that season, he retired from playing professionally. He continued playing semi-professionally with Ludlow Lusitano in Massachusetts.

=== National team ===
McCully earned two caps with the United States during the 1975 Copa Ciudad de México. He scored in his debut match, an August 19, 1975 loss to Costa Rica. His second cap came a week later in another loss, this time to Mexico. In both matches he played alongside his brother Charlie McCully.

== Coach and personal life ==
In addition to his playing career, McCully also served as an assistant coach of Southern Connecticut State University men's soccer team, and obtained a teaching degree from the university. Outside sport, he joined the U.S. Navy only a few years after arriving in the country and served as a medic during the Vietnam War. In civilian life he worked for the Public Works Department in Wallingford, CT until retiring in 2019.

In 2006, he was inducted into the Connecticut Soccer Hall of Fame.

== See also ==
- List of Scottish football families
- List of United States men's international soccer players born outside the United States
