= Paul Mott =

American soccer player

Personal information
- Full name: Paul B. Mott, III
- Date of birth: June 19, 1958 (age 68)
- Place of birth: Berlin, Germany
- Position: Defender

Youth career
- 1972-1975: Lawrenceville Big Red

College career
Years	Team	Apps	(Gls)
1976-1979	Dartmouth		

Senior career*
Years	Team	Apps	(Gls)
1980	Tampa Bay Rowdies	11	(0)
1980-1981	Tampa Bay Rowdies (indoor)	13	(1)
1981	New York United		
- * Club domestic league appearances and goals

Paul B. Mott, III (born June 19, 1958) is an American retired professional soccer player, as well as a sports consultant and former professional sports executive.

== Early life ==
Mott was born in Berlin, West Germany, to American parents, Paul and Susan Mott, while his father was working there as a U.S. Intelligence officer. After the family returned to the U.S., he lived in Lawrence Township, Mercer County, New Jersey and played high school soccer at the Lawrenceville School in the township's Lawrenceville section, earning All-State honors before attending Dartmouth College.

== Soccer career ==
At Dartmouth, he was team captain, a two-time All-Ivy League selection, and a second team All-American for the college's soccer team, and was later inducted into the school's Hall of Fame in 1984. Mott was selected in the first round of the December 1979 NASL draft by the Tampa Bay Rowdies and was also selected by the New York Arrows in the MISL territorial draft a month earlier. He signed in February with Tampa Bay seeing limited action during the 1980 outdoor season, but was a regular during the team's 1980-81 indoor campaign, appearing in 13 of 18 games. After being released by the Rowdies, he spent the 1981 season as a starter with New York United of the American Soccer League before giving up as a player because of a chronic ankle injury.

== Post-playing career ==
After initially working in college admissions at Rollins College and later at Williams College, he moved to Dallas in 1985 where he coached soccer and taught at St. Mark's School for eleven years.

He worked for both the 1994 FIFA World Cup and the 1996 Summer Olympics as a field producer. From their start up in 1996 until 2000 he worked for the Dallas Burn of MLS as the Vice President of Operations and Administration, and later as a Senior Vice President. In 2000 he became the Vice President of Special Projects for Major League Soccer.

=== NBA years and return to MLS ===
He then moved to the NBA where he spent three and a half years with the league's division of Marketing and Team Business Operation. In April 2005, he was named president of the New Orleans Hornets, and later that year drew praise for his calm handling of team operations during the chaotic aftermath of Hurricane Katrina, which including relocating the team to Oklahoma City while their arena and city recovered. He left the organization in July 2006.

He then returned to MLS as a consultant before being hired full-time in 2007 as the league's head of team services. He left that position in 2011 after four years to work at his own sports firm, TeamBow Consulting.
