= Róger Flores (Costa Rican footballer) =

Costa Rican footballer (born 1959)

Personal information
- Full name: Róger Flores Solano
- Date of birth: 26 May 1959 (age 67)
- Place of birth: San José, Costa Rica
- Position: Defender

Senior career*
Years	Team	Apps	(Gls)
1978–1979	Sagrada Familia		
1980–1981	San Carlos		
1982	Sagrada Familia		
1983–1987	Alajuelense		
1987–1996	Saprissa		
1996	Turrialba		
Total		-	(30)

International career^{‡}
1983–1991	Costa Rica	49	(2)

Managerial career
- 1996–1998: Goicoechea
- 2000: Santa Bárbara
- 2001: Herediano
- 2007–2008: Barrio Mexico
- 2009: Liberia Mía (assistant)
- * Club domestic league appearances and goals ‡ National team caps and goals as of 1 July 2014

Róger Flores Solano (born 26 May 1959) is a retired Costa Rican football player, a manager and father of three.

He was the captain of the Costa Rica national football team during the 1990 FIFA World Cup held in Italy. It was the country's first World Cup ever and the national squad accomplished the historic feat of qualifying for the second round against all odds, beating teams apparently much stronger such as Scotland and Sweden. He scored a goal against Sweden, even though he was a defender.

== Club career ==
In Costa Rica, Il Capitano (The Captain in Italian) started his career at Sagrada Familia and played for the two most popular teams, Alajuelense and Saprissa. He started out in Alajuela in the mid 80's, and was part of the team that won the CONCACAF Champions Cup in 1986. He won two national titles with Alajuelense as well. After his transfer to Saprissa, he reached the pinnacle of his career, becoming a star and the captain of the team as well of the national squad. With Saprissa, he won three more local tournaments, and another two CONCACAF Champions Cup.

He retired in 1996. As a player, he is remembered for his leadership and security on the field, and his excellent coverages of the opposing teams' strikers.

== International career ==
Flores made his debut for Costa Rica in a March 1983 friendly match against Mexico and collected a total of 49 caps, scoring two goals. He represented his country in 18 FIFA World Cup qualification matches and played at the 1991 UNCAF Nations Cup, winning that title, and the 1991 CONCACAF Gold Cup.

His final international was a July 1991 CONCACAF Gold Cup match against Mexico.

=== International goals ===
Scores and results list Costa Rica's goal tally first.

N.	Date	Venue	Opponent	Score	Result	Competition
1.	2 April 1989	Estadio Ricardo Saprissa Aymá, San José, Costa Rica	Guatemala	1-0	2–1	1990 FIFA World Cup qualification
2.	20 June 1990	Stadio Luigi Ferraris, Genoa, Italy	Sweden	1–1	2–1	1990 FIFA World Cup

== Managerial career ==
After retiring, he went on to coach several teams in Costa Rica's First Division, as well as a minor national team. His first job was as coach of Goicoechea in 1996, where he was replaced by Didier Castro in March 1998. He was in charge at Santa Bárbara for only 4 weeks in 2000 and also managed Herediano.

In August 2009 Flores was appointed assistant at Liberia Mía.

== Personal life ==
His son Andrés is a professional footballer who, like his father, plays as a defender.
