= Dave Taber =

American soccer player

Personal information
- Full name: G. David Taber
- Date of birth: September 26, 1958 (age 68)
- Place of birth: Doylestown, Pennsylvania, United States
- Position: Defender

College career
Years	Team	Apps	(Gls)
- Philadelphia Textile

Senior career*
Years	Team	Apps	(Gls)
1980–1981	Tampa Bay Rowdies	4	(0)
1980–1981	Tampa Bay Rowdies (indoor)	15	(4)
- * Club domestic league appearances and goals

Dave Taber (born September 26, 1958) is a retired American soccer defender who played two seasons in the North American Soccer League. He is currently the Vice President of Marketing and Sales for The Wealth Maintenance Organization.

== Playing career ==
A high school All American soccer player, Taber attended Philadelphia Textile where he played on the men's soccer team. In 1980, he signed with the Tampa Bay Rowdies of the North American Soccer League. He saw time in only one game that season, but became a regular during the 1980–81 indoor season.

== After soccer ==
After Taber retired from soccer, he entered the marketing department of Hercules Incorporated. After eight years with Hercules, he moved to Fresh Western Marketing which was located in Salinas, California before becoming a manager with Comcast Cellular. He then moved to Ericsson, Inc., where he was a vice president for six years. In September 2008, he became a vice president of marketing and sales with The Wealth Maintenance Organization.
