= Alfonso Estupiñán =

Costa Rican footballer (born 1948)

Personal information
- Full name: Alfonso Estupiñán Quirós
- Date of birth: 4 June 1948 (age 78)
- Place of birth: Puntarenas, Puntarenas Province, Costa Rica
- Position: Right-back

Senior career*
Years	Team	Apps	(Gls)
1965–1969	Municipal Puntarenas		
1970–1978	Alajuelense		
1978	Limonense		
1979–1981	Ramonense		

International career
1967–1976	Costa Rica	19	(1)
- * Club domestic league appearances and goals

Alfonso Estupiñán Quirós (born 4 June 1948) is a Costa Rican retired footballer. He played as a right-back for Municipal Puntarenas, Alajuelense and Limonense throughout the late 1960s and the 1970s. He also represented his native Costa Rica internationally for the 1969 and 1971 CONCACAF Championships as well as playing in the 1975 Copa Ciudad de México.

== Club career ==
Estupiñán began his career during the 1965 Primera División de Costa Rica for Municipal Puntarenas. Despite the 1960s never seeing Puntarenas achieving any titles, Estupiñán had been known as a team player to where he stood up for his teammates against the decisions of referees. Around this time, Estupiñán established himself as the club's main right-back. The dawn of the 1970s saw Estupiñán switch over to Alajuelense to be within the club's defense as the team later won the 1970 Primera División de Costa Rica. This success was later repeated in the following 1971 Primera División de Costa Rica with yet another title as well as Estupiñán being promoted to the club's captain around the same time. He remained in Alajuelense throughout the majority of the 1970s though he would begin to get prone to injury as the years progressed. During the middle of the 1978 season, he switched to play for Limonense. His career there was short lived as by January 1979, he was within the ranks of Ramonense as the club was undergoing a major restructuring. There, he remained until his retirement in 1981 following the final match of the season.

== International career ==
Estupiñán was first called up to represent Costa Rica in a 3–1 loss against El Salvador on 29 October 1967. His first major tournament would be through the 1970 FIFA World Cup qualifiers. Despite a poor campaign in where Costa Rica would be eliminated by Honduras, Estupiñán would be praised for being one of the few players to be efficient even with the odds against him. This led to him being subsequentlly called up for the 1969 CONCACAF Championship where he would contribute to Costa Rica achieving their second title following an absence in the previous edition despite Estupiñán himself never making any appearance in the tournament itself. He had a far more prevalent role in the following 1971 CONCACAF Championship where in the opening match against Cuba, he scored the third goal in a 3–0 victory. He primarily served as a substitute player throughout his other appearances for Asdrúbal Paniagua and Álvaro Grant in the matches against Honduras and Trinidad and Tobago. Four years later, he made another appearance at the 1975 Copa Ciudad de México in Costa Rica's worst ever result in a 7–0 thrashing against Mexico. He made his final appearance during the 1977 CONCACAF Championship qualifiers where the Ticos would once again fail to qualify for both the 1977 CONCACAF Championship and the 1978 FIFA World Cup.
