= Altino Domingues =

Portuguese-American soccer player

Tino Domingues
Personal information
- Full name: Altino Domingues
- Date of birth: November 2, 1951 (age 74)
- Place of birth: Coimbra, Portugal
- Height: 5 ft 8 in (1.73 m)
- Position: Defender
- Newark Portuguese

College career
Years	Team	Apps	(Gls)
1971–1972	Montclair State Red Hawks		

Senior career*
Years	Team	Apps	(Gls)
1974–1975	Rhode Island Oceaneers		
1976	Hartford Bicentennials	5	(0)
1977–1978	New Jersey Americans	45	(0)

International career
1975	United States	4	(0)
- * Club domestic league appearances and goals

Altino "Tino" Domingues (born November 2, 1951) is a retired Portuguese-American soccer defender. He played professionally in the United States and earned four caps with the U.S. national team in 1976.

== Club career ==
In 1971 and 1972, Domingues played soccer for Montclair State. He was a 1972 New Jersey All State at Montclair. He also played for the Newark Portuguese. In 1974, he turned professional with the Rhode Island Oceaneers. In 1976, Domingues played a single season with the Hartford Bicentennials in the North American Soccer League. In 1977, he played for the New Jersey Americans in the ASL.

== National team ==
Domingues earned his first cap in a 4–0 loss to Poland on June 24, 1976. He then played all three U.S. losses at the Mexico City Tournament in August 1976. Of his four games with the U.S., Domingues started three and came on for Werner Roth in the 46th minute of the August 18th loss to Costa Rica.
