= Peter Chandler (soccer) =

American soccer player (born 1953)

Personal information
- Date of birth: March 19, 1953 (age 73)
- Place of birth: Duxbury, Massachusetts, United States
- Positions: Forward; defender

College career
Years	Team	Apps	(Gls)
1971–1972	Springfield Pride		
1973–1974	South Florida Bulls		

Senior career*
Years	Team	Apps	(Gls)
1975–1976	Hartford Bicentennials	31	(0)
1977	Connecticut Bicentennials	9	(0)
1978–1981	Tampa Bay Rowdies	4	(0)
1980–1981	Tampa Bay Rowdies (indoor)	13	(0)

International career
1975	United States	3	(0)

Managerial career
- Peak to Peak Charter School
- * Club domestic league appearances and goals

Peter Chandler is an American former soccer player who spent four seasons in the North American Soccer League. He also earned three caps with the U.S. national team in 1975.

== Player ==
=== College ===
Chandler attended Springfield College in Springfield, Massachusetts where he played as a forward on the men's soccer team during the early 1970s. He graduated with a bachelor's degree in physical education. He later attended the University of South Florida where he earned a master's degree in physical education.

=== Professional ===
In 1975, he attended a tryout camp held by the expansion Hartford Bicentennials of the North American Soccer League. He impressed the team enough to gain a contract. While he was a forward in college, the Bicentennials moved Chandler to defense. After the 1976 season, the Bicentennials moved to New Haven, Connecticut and adopted the name, the Connecticut Bicentennials. Chandler played nine games of the 1977 season with Connecticut. The team moved again at the end of the season, this time to Oakland, California. However, Chandler did not remain with the team, but signed with the Tampa Bay Rowdies as a free agent for the 1978 season. He broke the tibia in his right leg after only four games with the Rowdies. He lost the rest of the season, then rebroke his tibia in July 1979. He finally took the field again for the Rowdies during the 1980-1981 NASL indoor season. He played 13 games.

In addition to his regular teams, Chandler was part of an NASL All Star team, called Team America, which competed with the national teams of Italy, Brazil and England in the 1976 U.S.A. Bicentennial Cup Tournament.

=== National team ===
Chandler played three games with the U.S. national team. All three came in the 1975 Copa Ciudad de México. His first game was a 3–1 loss to Costa Rica on August 19, 1975. The team then lost to Argentina two days later and finished with a 2–0 loss to Mexico on August 24.

== Coach ==
After retiring from playing professional soccer, Chandler entered the educational career field. He has served as a high school physical education teacher, athletic director and soccer, basketball and baseball coach. He is currently the head coach of the boys' soccer team and an assistant with the girls' soccer team at Peak to Peak Charter School in Lafayette, Colorado. In 2005, he took his boys' team to the 2005 Colorado Class 3A State championship. In 1989, Chandler and his wife had quintuplets. Four of those were girls who now play college soccer at four different colleges.
