= Carlos Solano =

Costa Rican footballer

Personal information
- Full name: Carlos Solano Fernández
- Place of birth: Turrialba, Costa Rica
- Position: Striker

Senior career*
Years	Team	Apps	(Gls)
1968–1969	Turrialba		
1970–	Saprissa		
- Cartaginés
1980	Real España		
- Olimpia
- Suchitepéquez
1986–1987	Ramonense		
1987	Sagrada Familia		

International career^{‡}
- Costa Rica
- * Club domestic league appearances and goals as of 20 June 2006 ‡ National team caps and goals as of 20 June 2006

Carlos Solano Fernández (born 1950 or 1951) is a Costa Rican former professional footballer. He played most of his career for Deportivo Saprissa.

== Club career ==
Solano helped Saprissa win several national titles during the 1970s, becoming one of the best goal scorers of the mythical Saprissa team that won six national championships in a row from 1972 to 1977, and was the top scorer in the 1976 national tournament, scoring a total of 49 goals during those six seasons. He is one of few players who scored 5 goals in one Costa Rica Primera División match.

He also played abroad in Honduras, winning another league title, and Guatemala before returning home to finish his career as player/manager of Sagrada Familia.

== International career ==
He played with the Costa Rica national football team during the 1978 FIFA World Cup qualification. He also represented Costa Rica at the 1975 Pan American Games in Mexico.

== Retirement ==
After retiring, Solano ran a sports shop in Siquirres. He appeared in the 2017 film La paisana Jacinta en búsqueda de Wasaberto.
