= Eduardo Garduño =

Mexican footballer (born 1928)

Personal information
- Full name: Eduardo Garduño Gómez
- Date of birth: 2 October 1928
- Place of birth: Cuernavaca, Mexico

International career
Years	Team	Apps	(Gls)
1948	Mexico	1	(0)

Eduardo Garduño Gómez (born 2 October 1928, date of death unknown) was a Mexican footballer. He competed in the men's tournament at the 1948 Summer Olympics.
