= Enrique Vázquez =

Mexican footballer (1950–2011)

Personal information
- Full name: Carlos Enrique Vázquez del Mercado
- Date of birth: 31 July 1950
- Place of birth: Guadalajara, Mexico
- Date of death: 16 June 2011 (aged 60)
- Place of death: Mexico
- Height: 1.81 m (5 ft 11 1/2 in)
- Position: Goalkeeper

Youth career
- 1960–1969: Guadalajara

Senior career*
Years	Team	Apps	(Gls)
1969–1972	Guadalajara	4	(0)
1969–1970	→ América (loan)		
1972–1974	Atlético Español		
1974–1975	Veracruz		
1975–1977	Pumas	64	(0)
1977–1978	Tecos	39	(0)
1978–1979	Atlante	0	(0)
1979–1982	Tampico	65	(0)
- * Club domestic league appearances and goals

Carlos Enrique Vázquez del Mercado (31 July 1950 – 16 June 2011) was a Mexican footballer who played as a goalkeeper.

== Career ==
Born in Guadalajara, Jalisco, Vázquez began playing football with the youth sides of C.D. Guadalajara. In 1969, he joined the senior side as the third goalkeeper. To get regular playing time, Vázquez went on loan to Club América for the 1969–70 season. He made his professional debut under América manager Walter Ormeño, but returned to Guadalajara the following season.

Vázquez played sparingly for Guadalajara before venturing on a journeyman's career with Atlético Español, Tiburones Rojos de Veracruz, Club Universidad Nacional, Tecos, Atlante F.C. and Jaibos Del Tampico before retiring at age 32. He won the 1976–77 Mexican Primera División title with Pumas.

== Personal ==
Vázquez died from a heart attack at age 61.
