= Charlie McCully =

US international soccer player (1947–2007)

Personal information
- Full name: Charles Findlay McCully
- Date of birth: April 30, 1947
- Place of birth: Motherwell, Scotland
- Date of death: October 23, 2007 (aged 60)
- Place of death: Meriden, Connecticut, United States
- Height: 6 ft 0 in (1.83 m)
- Position: Forward

Youth career
- Cambuslang Rangers

Senior career*
Years	Team	Apps	(Gls)
1966	Stirling Albion	1	(0)
1967	Philadelphia Ukrainians		
1968	Boston Beacons	6	(0)
1971–1972	New York Cosmos	31	(6)
1975–1976	Hartford Bicentennials	30	(5)
1976	Washington Diplomats	8	(1)
1977	Connecticut Yankees	5	(1)

International career
1973–1975	United States	11	(0)
- * Club domestic league appearances and goals

Charles Findlay McCully (April 30, 1947 – October 23, 2007) was a soccer player who played as a forward. He spent two seasons in the American Soccer League, one in the German American Soccer League and five in the North American Soccer League. An emigrant from Scotland, he also earned eleven caps with the U.S. national team between 1973 and 1975. He was the brother of Scottish American soccer player Henry McCully.

== Professional career ==
Born in Motherwell, Scotland, McCully relocated to the United States and initially played two seasons in the American Soccer League. In 1968, he signed with the Boston Beacons of the North American Soccer League (NASL). The Beacons folded at the end of the season and McCully moved to the German American Soccer League for the next two seasons. In 1971, the expansion New York Cosmos signed McCully. He played twenty-four games, scoring six goals in 1971. The next season, he played in only seven games and scored no goals before leaving the NASL. In 1975, he returned to the NASL with the Hartford Bicentennials. In 1976, Hartford traded him to the Washington Diplomats. He retired from the professional game at the end of the season. He played semi-professional and amateur soccer until age 55.

== National team ==
As a naturalized citizen, McCully earned eleven caps with the U.S. national team between 1973 and 1975. His first game with the national team came in a 1–0 win over Poland on August 12, 1973. His last game was a 2–0 loss to Mexico on August 25, 1975 at the 1975 Copa Ciudad de México in which he played alongside his brother Henry McCully, who gained both of his two caps at the tournament.

In 1999, McCully was inducted into the Connecticut Soccer Hall of Fame as an inaugural member.

== See also ==
- List of Scottish football families
- List of United States men's international soccer players born outside the United States
