= A.D. Municipal Curridabat =

Costa Rican football club

- Full name: Asociación Deportiva Municipal Curridabat
- Nickname(s): Curri
- Founded: 6 November 1979
- Ground: Estadio José Joaquín ''Colleya'' Fonseca, Guadalupe; José Ángel Lito Monge, Curridabat

Asociación Deportiva Municipal Curridabat was a Costa Rican football club, that played a few seasons in the Primera División.

== History ==
Founded in November 1979, Curridabat made it to the Segunda División in 1980 and won promotion to the Primera División in 1985. They played their first match in the top flight on 31 March 1985 against Sagrada Familia and played two seasons in the Primera División, in 1985 and 1987. The club later fell in decline and finally disappeared.

== Honours ==
=== National ===
- Segunda División de Costa Rica: 2

1984, 1986

== Players ==
=== Player Records ===
Most Primera División appearances: # / Name / Career / Apps / Goals; 1 / Otoniel Hidalgo / 51	Most Primera División goals: # / Player / Career / Apps / Goals; 1 / Victor Calvo / / / 12

=== Notable players ===
- (Costa Rica) Víctor Badilla
- (Costa Rica) Henry Duarte
- (Costa Rica) César Hines
- (Costa Rica) Miguel Lacey (1987)
- (Costa Rica) Asdrúbal Paniagua (1985)
- (Costa Rica) Rolando Villalobos (1985)

== Historical list of coaches ==
- (Costa Rica) Floyd Daniels (1985)
- (Costa Rica) Saddy Gutiérrez (1986)
- (Costa Rica) Juan José Gámez (1987)
