= Rolando Villalobos =

Costa Rican footballer and manager (born 1953)

Personal information
- Full name: Rolando Villalobos Chacón
- Date of birth: 25 July 1953 (age 73)
- Place of birth: San José, Costa Rica
- Height: 1.78 m (5 ft 10 in)
- Position: Midfielder

Youth career
- 1965–1971: Alajuelense

Senior career*
Years	Team	Apps	(Gls)
1971–1979	Alajuelense		
1980	San Carlos		
1981	Alajuelense		
1982–1984	Saprissa		
1983	Juventud Retalteca		
1985	Curridabat		
1986–1988	Saprissa		
Total		411	(46)

International career
1972–1975	Costa Rica	9	(1)

Managerial career
- 1991: Costa Rica
- 1991–1992: Saprissa
- 1992–1993: Turrialba
- 1993–1994: Herediano
- 1995–1996: Cartaginés
- 1997: Costa Rica U23
- 1998: Costa Rica
- 2001–2002: Cartaginés
- 2004–2005: UCR
- 2006: Alajuelense
- 2011–2012: Costa Rica (selection coordinator)
- 2012: Cartaginés (sports director)
- 2013–2014: Puntarenas (sports director)
- * Club domestic league appearances and goals

Rolando Villalobos Chacón (born 25 July 1953) is a retired Costa Rican footballer and football manager.

== Club career ==
After coming through their youth ranks, Villalobos made his senior debut for Alajuelense on 9 May 1971 against rivals Saprissa and he scored his first goal on 12 April 1972 against Ramonense. He had a stint in Guatemala as well and also played for San Carlos and Saprissa.

He retired at Saprissa in 1988, his last game was on 12 May that year against his first club Alajuelense.

== International career ==
He made his debut for Costa Rica in an August 1972 friendly match against Mexico and collected a total of 9 caps, scoring 1 goal. Villalobos played for Costa Rica at the 1975 Pan American Games.

=== International goals ===
Scores and results list Costa Rica's goal tally first.

N.	Date	Venue	Opponent	Score	Result	Competition
1.	1975		El Salvador			1976 Summer Olympics qualification

== Managerial career ==
Nicknamed el Cadáver, Villalobos has managed the Big Four clubs of Costa Rica as well as the national team on two occasions. He was assistant to Bora Milutinović at the 1990 FIFA World Cup.

He was named sports director of Cartaginés in May 2012 and in January 2014 he resigned as sports director of Puntarenas. Now he works for Club Sport Herediano as a sports manager.

== Personal life ==
His son Walter Villalobos also is a professional football player. Married twice, Villalobos has 5 children.
