= Rubén Anguiano =

Mexican footballer (1950–2020)

Personal information
- Date of birth: 17 November 1950
- Place of birth: Mexico City, Mexico
- Date of death: 28 September 2020 (aged 69)
- Place of death: Mexico City, Mexico
- Position: Midfielder

Senior career*
Years	Team	Apps	(Gls)
1971–1975	Zacatepec		
1975–1978	Leones Negros		
1978–1985	Atlante		

International career
1974–1977	Mexico	8	(0)
- * Club domestic league appearances and goals

Rubén Anguiano (17 November 1950 – 28 September 2020) was a Mexican footballer who played as a midfielder.

== Career ==
Born in Mexico City, Anguiano played for Zacatepec, Leones Negros and Atlante.

He earned 8 caps for the Mexico national football team from 1974 to 1977.

He died on 28 September 2020, aged 69, from COVID-19 during the COVID-19 pandemic in Mexico.
