= Alain Maca =

Soccer player (born 1950)

Personal information
- Full name: Alain F. Maca
- Date of birth: February 10, 1950 (age 76)
- Place of birth: Brussels, Belgium
- Position: Defender

Youth career
- 1968–1971: Brockport University

Senior career*
Years	Team	Apps	(Gls)
1972	Miami Gatos	11	(0)
1973	Baltimore Bays		
1974–1976	Washington Diplomats	31	(1)
1978–1979	New York Apollo		

International career
1973–1975	United States	5	(0)
- * Club domestic league appearances and goals

Alain F. Maca (born February 10, 1950) is a former soccer defender and former President of the JFK International Air Terminal (Terminal 4). He was the first person drafted by the North American Soccer League and spent four seasons in the league. Born in Belgium, he earned five caps with the United States national team between 1973 and 1975.

== College ==
Maca's father, Joe, was a member of the U.S. team at the 1950 FIFA World Cup. Maca attended the State University of New York at Brockport (SUNY Brockport) where he played on the men's soccer team from 1968 to 1971. He was a second team All-American in 1969 and a third team All-American in 1970 and graduated in 1972 with a bachelor's degree in sports science. The university inducted Maca into its Athletic Hall of Fame in 2000. Inducted into the Brockport Athletic Hall of Fame in 2000.

== Soccer career ==
=== Professional ===
On February 9, 1972, the North American Soccer League (NASL) held its first college draft. The Miami Toros drafted Maca with the first draft pick in that draft. Maca spent the 1972 NASL season in Miami, seeing time in eleven games. He moved to the Baltimore Bays of the American Soccer League (ASL) for the 1973 season. In 1974, the expansion Washington Diplomats of the NASL signed Maca. He spent three seasons with the Dips. He finished his playing career with the ASL New York Apollo in 1977 and 1978.

=== National team ===
Maca earned five caps with the U.S. national team. His first cap came in a 1–0 win over Bermuda on September 9, 1973. His last came in a 2–0 loss to Mexico on August 24, 1975.

== Aviation career ==
=== KLM ===
Maca joined KLM in 1972. Over his years playing soccer, Maca also spent time during the athletic off seasons working for KLM in airports in New York, Atlanta, Georgia and Orlando, Florida. After a brief time working for Ogden Aviation Services in 1994, he rejoined the company and remained with it until 1998. His final position with the company was the Area Director Customer Services North America.

=== JKK International Terminal ===
After leaving KLM in 1998, Maca was the General Manager at the JFK International Air Terminal (JFKIAT). In that capacity, he oversaw the reconstruction of the terminal. When the reconstruction was complete in May 2001, Maca moved to GlobeGround Aviation. He has since returned to JFKIAT where he serves as its president.

=== Amsterdam Schiphol Airport ===
In 2005, he spent about nine months as the interim Chief Operating Officer at Amsterdam Schiphol Airport.
