= Hugo Coscia =

Argentine footballer

Personal information
- Full name: Hugo Oscar Coscia
- Date of birth: 12 October 1952 (age 74)
- Place of birth: Chacabuco, Buenos Aires, Argentina
- Position: Striker

Senior career*
Years	Team	Apps	(Gls)
1972–1973	Estudiantes de La Plata		
1974–1975	Colón		
1975–1977	Potosino	35	(9)
1977–1978	River Plate		
1979	San Lorenzo		
1980	Boca Juniors		
1981	Rosario Central		

International career
1975–1979	Argentina	9	(4)
- * Club domestic league appearances and goals

Hugo Oscar Coscia (born 12 October 1952) is a retired football striker who played for several clubs in the Argentine Primera División and the Argentina national football team.

== Career ==
Born in Chacabuco, Buenos Aires, Coscia began playing professional football with Estudiantes de La Plata in the Primera División. Next, he passed through Colón de Santa Fe.

In 1975, Coscia moved abroad to play for Mexican Primera División side Atlético Potosino for two seasons. When his contract expired, Coscia returned to Argentina to play for Club Atlético River Plate. In 1979, Coscia joined San Lorenzo de Almagro and would play in the club's final match at Estadio Gasómetro, a 0–0 draw with Club Atlético Boca Juniors where Coscia had a penalty kick saved by Hugo Gatti. The following season, he joined Boca Juniors, making Coscia one of a select few players to appear for rivals River Plate and Boca Juniors.

Coscia made several appearances for the Argentina national football team and participated in the 1979 Copa América.
