= Pepe Delgado =

Mexican footballer (born 1947)

Personal information
- Full name: José Delgado Pérez
- Date of birth: 10 January 1947 (age 79)
- Place of birth: Guadalajara, Jalisco, Mexico
- Position: Forward

Youth career
- ???–1965: Atlas

Senior career*
Years	Team	Apps	(Gls)
1965–1979	Atlas		

International career
1968–1976	Mexico	14	(2)
Medal record
Men's football
Representing Mexico
CONCACAF Championship
Bronze medal – third place	1973 Haiti	Team
- * Club domestic league appearances and goals

José Delgado Pérez (born 18 January 1947) is a retired Mexican footballer. Nicknamed Pepe, he played for Atlas throughout the late 1960s and the 1970s, overseeing the club be relegated and promoted two times throughout his career. He also represented Mexico for the 1973 CONCACAF Championship.

== Club career ==
Due to a project by Atlas manager Javier Novello wanting to bring in younger players to the senior team, Delgado at the age of 17, made his debut during the 1965–66 Copa México match against Tampico Madero. Despite only making one appearance in the Liga MX overall that season, the club narrowly missed the 1965–66 Mexican Primera División title following an away loss to Atlante. Thus, the following season saw a new generation of players known as the "Niños Catedráticos" such as José Luis Herrera, Guillermo Torres and Delgado all made more and more appearances. These decisions would lead to Atlas earning their only title throughout the 1960s via winning the 1967–68 Copa México. The 1970s wouldn't get any better for the Rojinegros as they were relegated in their 1970–71 season though Delgado would contribute significantly to the club winning the 1971–72 Mexican Segunda División, earning their place back in the top-flight of Mexican football. The same deal would happen during their second relegation in the 1977–78 season with Delgado again securing the club's place following their immediate win at the 1978–79 Mexican Segunda División with Delgado retiring in the following season, holding a legacy as one of the club's finest goalscorers.

== International career ==
Delgado made his debut on a 3–3 away draw against Peru on 20 October 1968. He wouldn't see any further appearances until 9 February 1973 in a 2–0 victory over Argentina. He was notably called up for the 1973 CONCACAF Championship with Delgado making 4 appearances throughout the tournament but Mexico would fail to qualify for the first time since the 1934 FIFA World Cup. He continued to play for El Tricolor throughout various friendlies across the mid-1970s until his final appearance on 3 February 1976 in 4–1 beating against Hungary.

== Personal life ==
Since 2018, Delgado had been suffering from Alzheimer's disease. That same year saw former players from the 1990s from both Atlas and Guadalajara such as Daniel Osorno, Miguel Zepeda, Mario Méndez, Erubey Cabuto and Héctor López to hold two matches in his honor.

=== International goals ===
No	Date	Venue	Opponent	Score	Result	Competition
1.	17 August 1975	Azteca, Mexico City, Mexico	Costa Rica	3–0	7–0	Friendly
2.	24 August 1975	Azteca, Mexico City, Mexico	United States	2–0	2–0	Friendly

== See also ==
- List of one-club men in association football
