= Heriberto Rojas =

Costa Rican footballer

Personal information
- Full name: Heriberto Rojas Herrera
- Position: Defender

Youth career
- 1960–1963: Saprissa

Senior career*
Years	Team	Apps	(Gls)
1963–1977	Saprissa	336	
1977–	Cartaginés		

International career
- Costa Rica
- * Club domestic league appearances and goals

Heriberto Rojas Herrera (born 1942 or 1943) is a former Costa Rican footballer who played his entire career for Deportivo Saprissa, during the 1960s and 1970s.

He was a defender, which was always felt by his teammates in both Saprissa and the Costa Rica national football team.

== Club career ==
Herrera made his debut in the Costa Rican Primera División in 1963 and played 17 years for Saprissa. He won 11 national championships with Saprissa and was a key element in the legendary team that won six national championships in a row during the 70s, during which he led the defence.

== International career ==
Rojas played 4 games for Costa Rica in the 1974 FIFA World Cup qualifying rounds. He also played at the NORCECA tournament in 1969.

== Retirement and personal life ==
During his football career, Rojas also worked at the Instituto Nacional de Seguros (National Insurance Institute). After retiring from football, he worked as an insurance agent for Megaseguros. He is married and has two children.
