= José María Agüero =

Costa Rican footballer (1947–2023)

Personal information
- Full name: José María Agüero Araya
- Date of birth: 25 June 1947
- Place of birth: Alajuela, Costa Rica
- Date of death: 6 September 2023 (aged 76)
- Position: Defender

Senior career*
| Years | Team | Apps | (Gls) |
| 1969–1978 | Alajuelense | 189 | (0) |

International career
| | Costa Rica | 3 | (0) |
- * Club domestic league appearances and goals

José María Agüero Araya (25 June 1947 – 6 September 2023) was a Costa Rican professional footballer who played as a defender. He spent his entire club career with Alajuelense and represented the Costa Rica national team.

== Club career ==
Agüero was nicknamed "macho" and played his entire career with his hometown club Alajuelense, playing 189 games without scoring a goal. He was two-time champion of the Primera División in 1970 and 1971.

== International career ==
Agüero earned three caps with the Costa Rica national team, with his debut being on 26 February 1970, in a 2–0 victory against El Salvador.

== Death ==
Agüero died on 6 September 2023, at the age of 76.

== Honours ==
Alajuelense

- Primera División: 1970, 1971
