= José Daniel Valencia =

Argentine footballer

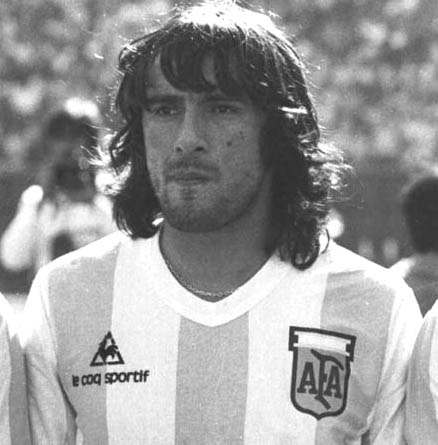
- Valencia with the Argentina national team, 1982

Personal information
- Full name: José Daniel Valencia
- Date of birth: 3 October 1955 (age 71)
- Place of birth: San Salvador de Jujuy, Argentina
- Height: 1.69 m (5 ft 7 in)
- Position: Attacking midfielder

Senior career*
Years	Team	Apps	(Gls)
1973–1974	Gimnasia de Jujuy	5	(1)
1975–1988	Talleres de Córdoba	274	(29)
1986	→ LDU Quito (loan)	26	(1)
1988	Guaraní Antonio Franco	?	(?)
1989	Rosario Central	0	(0)
1989–1990	Wilstermann	26	(0)
1991–1993	Club San José	78	(6)

International career
1975–1982	Argentina	41	(5)
Medal record
Representing Argentina
FIFA World Cup
Winner	1978 Argentina	Team
- * Club domestic league appearances and goals as of 3 September 2007

José Daniel Valencia (born 3 October 1955) is an Argentine former professional footballer who played as an attacking midfielder. He played for Argentina when the team won 1978 World Cup.

== Club career ==
Valencia started his club career at Gimnasia y Esgrima de Jujuy but was soon transferred to Talleres de Córdoba, the club at which he would play most of his career.

At Talleres, Valencia suffered the disappointment of finishing runner-up in Nacional 1977, finishing third in Metropolitano 1980, and losing the semi-finals on four occasions.

In 1986, he had a spell in Ecuadorian football with Liga Deportiva Universitaria de Quito, but only stayed one year before returning to Talleres for a further two seasons.

In 1988, he left Talleres to play for third division club Guaraní Antonio Franco in Misiones, Argentina. After a short spell in the lower leagues, he made a brief return to the first division with Rosario Central in 1989 before moving to Bolivia where he played for Club Jorge Wilstermann and then Club San José.

At San José, he again experienced the disappointment of being a losing finalist on two occasions; in the 1991 Clausura and the 1992 season. He also got his first taste of Copa Libertadores football, but with little success, as San José finished bottom of their group in both 1992 and 1993.

Valencia retired from club football in 1993 at the age of 37.

== International career ==
The highlight of Valencia's footballing career came in 1978 when he was selected to represent Argentina at the FIFA World Cup tournament. Although he featured in the first game, he was dropped due to a tactical reshuffle by manager César Luis Menotti. He was unlucky to miss out on the World Cup final in the Monumental stadium, but he did play a part in helping Argentina win their first World Cup.

Valencia was selected to play for Argentina at 1982 World Cup, but the team had a disappointing campaign, eliminated in the second group phase. He retired from international football at the end of the tournament, having represented his country 41 times, scoring five goals.

== Honours ==
=== Club ===
Talleres de Córdoba

- Copa Hermandad: 1977
- Liga Cordobesa de Fútbol: 1975, 1976, 1977, 1978, 1979
- Primera División runner-up: 1977 Nacional

=== International ===
Argentina Youth

- Toulon Tournament: 1975

Argentina

- FIFA World Cup: 1978
