= Miguel Juárez =

Argentine footballer

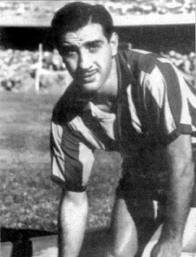

Personal information
- Full name: Miguel Antonio Juárez
- Date of birth: 29 September 1931
- Date of death: 4 March 1982 (aged 50)

International career
Years	Team	Apps	(Gls)
1957–1958	Argentina	5	(2)

Miguel Antonio Juárez (29 September 1931 – 4 March 1982) was an Argentine footballer. He played in five matches for the Argentina national football team in 1957 and 1958. He was also part of Argentina's squad for the 1957 South American Championship.
