= Manuel Nájera =

Mexican footballer (born 1952)

Personal information
- Full name: Manuel Nájera Siller
- Date of birth: 20 December 1952 (age 73)
- Place of birth: Cuautla, Morelos, Mexico
- Position: Defender

Senior career*
| Years | Team | Apps | (Gls) |
| 1971–1973 | Club Atlético Zacatepec | | |
| 1973–1975 | Puebla F.C. | | |
| 1975–1979 | Club Universidad de Guadalajara | 105 | (1) |
| 1979–1980 | CSD Jalisco | 27 | (2) |
| 1980–1983 | C.F. Monterrey | 83 | (0) |

International career
| 1972–1979 | Mexico | 20 | (0) |
- * Club domestic league appearances and goals

Manuel Nájera Siller (born 20 December 1952) is a Mexican former football defender who played for Mexico in the 1978 FIFA World Cup. He also played for Club Universidad de Guadalajara.
