= Miguel Oviedo =

Argentine footballer

Personal information
- Full name: Miguel Ángel Oviedo
- Date of birth: 12 October 1950 (age 76)
- Place of birth: Córdoba, Argentina
- Height: 1.72 m (5 ft 8 in)
- Position: Midfielder

Senior career*
Years	Team	Apps	(Gls)
1973	Instituto	14	(1)
1974–1982	Talleres	366 (total)	(36)
1983–1986	Independiente	9	(1)
1986–1987	Talleres	(see above)	
1987–1992	Deportivo Armenio	47	(7)
1992–1993	Los Andes		

International career
1978	Argentina	1	(0)
Medal record
Representing Argentina
FIFA World Cup
Winner	1978 Argentina	Team
- * Club domestic league appearances and goals

Miguel Ángel Oviedo (born 12 October 1950 in Córdoba) is an Argentine former football midfielder who was part of the Argentina squad that won the 1978 FIFA World Cup.

Oviedo played his entire club career in the Argentine league system, starting with Instituto de Córdoba in 1973.

In 1974, he was signed by Instituto's fierce local rivals Talleres de Córdoba. Over the next eight years Talleres were one of the strongest teams in Argentina, they reached several Semi-Finals in the Nacional championships and lost the final in 1977 on the away goals rule to Club Atlético Independiente.

In 1983 Oviedo joined Independiente, helping the team to win the Metropolitano 1983 championship in his first season with the club and the Copa Libertadores in his second season.

In 1986 Oviedo returned to Talleres but after one season in Córdoba he moved back to Buenos Aires to play for Deportivo Armenio he stayed with the club between 1987 and 1992 despite their relegation from the Primera in 1989.

Oviedo played for Club Atlético Los Andes of the Argentine 3rd division between 1992 and his retirement in 1993.

== Honours ==
=== Club ===
Talleres

- Copa Hermandad: 1977
- Liga Cordobesa de Fútbol: 1974, 1975, 1976, 1977, 1978, 1979
- Primera División runner-up: 1977 Nacional

Independiente

- Primera Division Argentina: Metropolitano 1983
- Copa Libertadores: 1984
- Intercontinental Cup: 1984

=== International ===
Argentina

- FIFA World Cup: 1978
