= Eduardo Ramos (Mexican footballer) =

Mexican footballer (born 1949)

Personal information
- Full name: Eduardo Ramos Escobedo
- Date of birth: 8 November 1949 (age 76)
- Place of birth: Mazatlán, Sinaloa, Mexico
- Position: Defender

Senior career*
Years	Team	Apps	(Gls)
- C.D. Guadalajara

International career
1971-1978	Mexico	38	(0)
- * Club domestic league appearances and goals

Eduardo Ramos Escobedo (born 8 November 1949) is a Mexican former football defender who played for Mexico in the 1978 FIFA World Cup. He also played for C.D. Guadalajara.
