= Pedro Damián Álvarez =

Mexican footballer (born 1949)

Personal information
- Full name: Pedro Damián Álvarez Alvarado
- Date of birth: 23 February 1949 (age 77)
- Place of birth: Irapuato, Guanajuato, Mexico
- Position: Forward

Senior career*
Years	Team	Apps	(Gls)
1967–1968	Monterrey		
1968–1969	Jabatos de Nuevo León		
1969–1973	Veracruz		
1973–1975	Monterrey		
1975–1980	Guadalajara	110	(25)
1980–1982	León		

International career
1970–1976	Mexico	17	(3)
- * Club domestic league appearances and goals

Pedro Damián Álvarez Alvarado (born 23 February 1949) is a retired Mexican footballer. He played as a forward for Monterrey, Veracruz, Guadalajara and León throughout the 1970s and early 1980s. He also represented Mexico internationally across the same decade, playing in the 1975 Copa Ciudad de México.

== Club career ==
Álvarez received his first professional contract in 1967 with Monterrey. A year later, he moved to Jabatos de Nuevo León, with whom he was relegated to the Segunda División at the end of the 1968–69 Mexican Primera División. Finding disinterest in playing in the Segunda División, he then began playing for Veracruz where he remained for the following four seasons with. He then chose to return to Monterrey for their 1973–74 season and continued to play for following 1974–75 season where he played alongside players such as Francisco Bertocchi, Gustavo Peña and Alacrán Jiménez. His career highlights began the following season when he was signed to play for Guadalajara for their 1975–76 season and remainder there for the following four seasons. Notably, he scored four goals against Atlas throughout various editions of the Clásico Tapatío within the Liga MX. He then spent the remainder of his career with León from their 1980–81 season and played for an additional season before retiring.

== International career ==
Álvarez made his international debut in a 2–1 loss against Brazil on 30 September 1970 in a friendly after appearing as substitute for Aarón Padilla. His international career primarily was spent playing in various home and away friendlies with his most notable appearance scoring the second goal in an eventual 7–0 thrashing against Costa Rica on 17 August 1975 during the 1975 Copa Ciudad de México with Mexico ultimately winning the tournament. He also the first goal in a 4–1 beating against Hungary on 3 February 1976. That year also saw his biggest contribution for El Tricolor came through his participation in the 1977 CONCACAF Championship qualifiers where he scored the second goal against rivals United States on 15 October. Despite helping the team qualify for the 1977 CONCACAF Championship, he wasn't selected for the final team and by proxy, was left out of the 1978 FIFA World Cup squad.

== Personal life ==
Pedro's son, Damián Álvarez followed his father's roots in becoming a professional footballer for Chivas as well as also playing in the national team.
