= Juan Alvarado (Mexican footballer) =

Mexican footballer (born 1948)

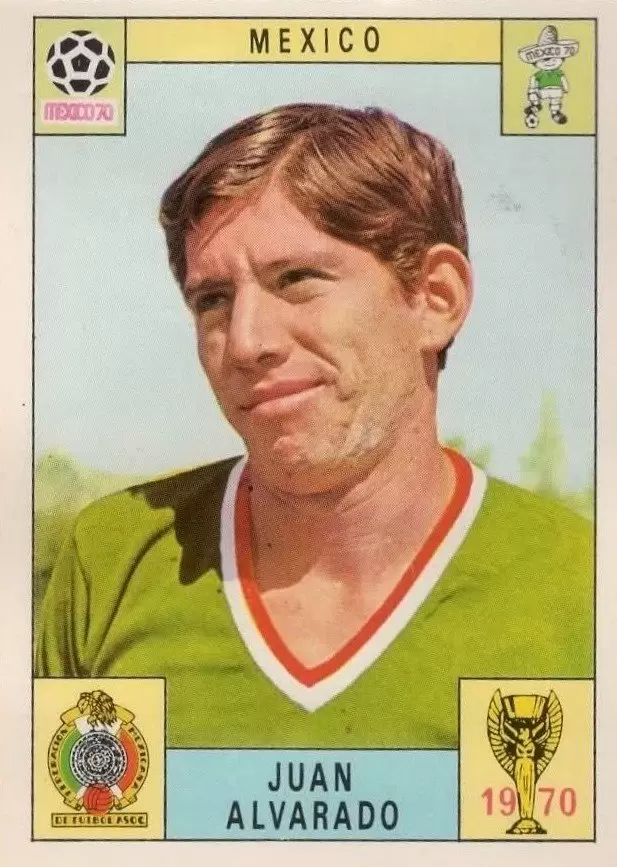

Personal information
- Full name: Juan Alvarado Marin
- Date of birth: December 27, 1948 (age 77)
- Place of birth: Zamora, Mexico
- Position: Striker

Senior career*
Years	Team	Apps	(Gls)
1972–1983	Puebla	180	(45)
1966–1972	Pumas	341	(33)
- * Club domestic league appearances and goals

Juan Alvarado Marin is a Mexican former Primera División (First Division) player, who played most of his career with Puebla F.C. where he won the 1982-83 league title and where he ranks 8th all time in goals scored with 33. In addition, he played the Club Universidad Nacional.

== Achievements ==
- Puebla FC
  - Mexican Primera División 1982-83
