= Asdrúbal Paniagua =

Costa Rican footballer (born 1951)

Personal information
- Full name: Asdrúbal Paniagua Ramírez
- Date of birth: 29 July 1951 (age 75)
- Place of birth: San Rafael de Heredia
- Position: Midfielder

Senior career*
Years	Team	Apps	(Gls)
1970–1976	Saprissa	245	(44)
1977–1984	Herediano		
1985	Curridabat		
Total		475	(78)

International career
1971–1985	Costa Rica	36	(3)
- * Club domestic league appearances and goals

Asdrúbal Paniagua Ramírez (born 29 July 1951, in San Rafael de Heredia) is a retired professional football player from Costa Rica.

Better known as Yuba, he played most of his career for Deportivo Saprissa, where he is still remembered as an idol.

== Career ==
=== Club career ===
Paniagua is generally for his shooting skills and passing abilities.

Paniagua was part of the Saprissa squad that won six consecutive championships from 1972 to 1977, a record both in Costa Rica as well as in the Americas. He was the club's leading scorer with twelve goals in 1974.

Paniagua also won three titles with Herediano.

=== International career ===
Paniagua appeared in 36 matches for the full Costa Rica national football team from 1971 to 1985, scoring 3 goals, and represented his country in 3 FIFA World Cup qualification matches. He played for Costa Rica at the 1975 Pan American Games.

== Personal life ==
Paniagua is married to Ligia Fuentes and has fathered seven children; Andrea, Ana Lucrecia, Rebecca, Ana Sofia, Fiorela, Kevin Hasdrubal and Asley. After retiring, he fell into a depression and became an alcoholic but he beat his addiction and worked as a sales agent for Grupo TACA. Ironically, he survived a serious car crash after being hit by a drunk-driver in 1997.
