= Walter Ormeño =

Peruvian football player and coach (1926–2020)

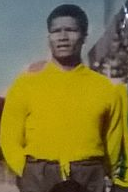
- Ormeño in 1956

Personal information
- Full name: José Francisco Walter Ormeño Arango
- Date of birth: 3 December 1926
- Place of birth: Lima, Peru
- Date of death: 4 January 2020 (aged 93)
- Height: 1.92 m (6 ft 4 in)
- Position: Goalkeeper

Senior career*
Years	Team	Apps	(Gls)
1946–1949	Universitario		
1950–1951	Huracán de Medellín		
1951–1952	Mariscal Sucre		
1952–1955	Boca Juniors	10	(0)
1956	Rosario Central	30	(0)
1957–1958	Alianza Lima		
1959–1961	América		
1962–1963	Atlante		
Total		40+	(0+)

International career
1949–1957	Peru		
- * Club domestic league appearances and goals

José Francisco Walter Ormeño Arango (3 December 1926 – 4 January 2020) was a Peruvian footballer who played as a goalkeeper.

== Playing career ==
Born in Lima, Ormeño played for Universitario de Deportes, Huracán de Medellín, Mariscal Sucre, Boca Juniors, Rosario Central, Alianza Lima, América and Atlante.

He also played for the Peruvian national team between 1949 and 1957, including playing at the 1949 South American Championship.

== Coaching career ==
After retiring as a player, he managed a number of clubs in Mexico. He also went on to manage noted Indian club Dempo in 1994, coached the team in the inaugural edition of the National Football League.

== Death ==
He died on 4 January 2020, aged 93.

== Personal life ==
Ormeño is the grandfather of Mexican-born Peru international footballer Santiago Ormeño.
