= Manuel Manzo =

Mexican footballer (born 1952)

Personal information
- Full name: Manuel Manzo Ortega
- Date of birth: 10 February 1952 (age 74)
- Place of birth: Mexico City, Mexico
- Height: 1.87 m (6 ft 1 1/2 in)
- Position: Midfielder

Senior career*
Years	Team	Apps	(Gls)
1968–1972	León		
1972–1975	Atlético Español		
1975–1977	Chivas		
1977–1978	Pumas		
1978–1979	Atlético Español		
1979	Houston Hurricane	10	(2)
1979–1980	Chivas		
1980–1983	Pumas		
1983–1984	Tigres		
1984–1985	Deportivo Neza		
1986–1987	Atlante		

International career
1981	Mexico	3	(1)

Managerial career
- 1997–1998: Toros Neza
- * Club domestic league appearances and goals

Manuel Manzo (born 10 February 1952) is a Mexican former footballer who played professionally in the Liga MX. He is an Olympian.

== Career ==
Born in Mexico City, Manzo began his career with Club León at age 16. He made his Primera División debut and quickly had success.

Manzo won the Primera División with Pumas in the 1980–81 season.

Manzo made three appearances for the Mexico national football team in 1981. He also played for Mexico at the 1972 Summer Olympics in Munich.

After he retired from playing, Manzo became a football coach. He managed Toros Neza from 1997 to 1998.

== Personal ==
Manzo suffered from alcoholism and nearly died while under contract with Chivas after he wandered into an empty swimming pool while drunk.
