= Jesús Rico (footballer) =

Mexican footballer (1953–2026)

Personal information
- Full name: Jesús Rico Espejel
- Date of birth: 11 January 1953
- Place of birth: Mexico City, Mexico
- Date of death: 11 September 2026 (aged 73)
- Position: Defender

International career
Years	Team	Apps	(Gls)
1972–1978	Mexico	5	(0)

Jesús Rico Espejel (Note: In this Mexican name, the surname is Rico and the second or maternal family name is Espejel.) (11 January 1953 – 11 September 2026) was a Mexican footballer who played as a defender. He competed in the men's tournament at the 1972 Summer Olympics. Rico died on 11 September 2026, at the age of 73.
