= Connecticut Bicentennials =

Defunct American soccer team

Connecticut Bicentennials (1977)
- Full name: Connecticut Bicentennials
- Nickname(s): Bicentennials; The Bi's
- Founded: 1975
- Dissolved: 1977
- Stadium: Yale Bowl; Dillon Stadium
- Capacity: 70,000
- League: NASL
Home colors	Away colors

Hartford Bicentennials (1975-76)
Home colors	Away colors

The Connecticut Bicentennials were an American soccer team that competed in the North American Soccer League (NASL) from 1975 to 1977. Originally founded as the Hartford Bicentennials, the team relocated to New Haven, Connecticut after the 1976 NASL season. At the end of 1977 season, the team was sold and relocated to California becoming the Oakland Stompers.

== History ==
Founded in 1975, and owned by local businessman Bob Darling, the team's name was a reference to the upcoming bicentennial anniversary of the United States founding in 1976. The team began play during the 1975 NASL Indoor tournament, finishing second in Region 2 and missing the final four on goal difference. Prior to the 1975 outdoor season, the Bicentennials signed fourteen players from the 1974 American Soccer League (ASL) champions Rhode Island Oceaneers, including goalkeeper Arnie Mausser, Charlie McCully, and Mohammad Attiah, as well as hiring the Oceaneers' head coach Manny Schellscheidt and General Manager Michael Bosson. The Bicentennials finished their inaugural season in last place of the Northern Division with a record of six wins and sixteen loses and an average attendance of 3,720 playing their home games at the Dillon Stadium which they shared with the Connecticut Yankees of the ASL. After the season, Bosson was replaced by the GM of the Connecticut Yankees Rudi Schiffer and, along with the signing of three European players, the contract of goalkeeper Arnie Mausser, who had allowed a record 50 goals during the season, was sold to the Tampa Bay Rowdies. Schellscheidt was replaced by Bobby Thompson after a 2-3 start to the 1976 outdoor season. The team ended the 1976 season with a record of twelve wins and twelve losses and averaging 3,420 fans per game. The team relocated to New Haven, Connecticut and rebranded as the Connecticut Bicentennials before the 1977 season. Playing their home games at the Yale Bowl, the team finished the 1977 season in last place of the Atlantic Conference Northern Division with a record of seven wins and nineteen losses. The Bicentennials drew their biggest crowd ever, with 17,302 fans in attendance, for their 1977 home opener against the New York Cosmos featuring Brazilian star Pelé, but averaged only 3,848 fans for the season. Citing low gate revenues and the cost to adequately light the Yale Bowl for night games, Darling sold the team to Milan Mandarić who relocated the team to Oakland, California for the 1978 season, where they became known as the Oakland Stompers.

== Year-by-year ==
Year	League	W	L	T	Pts	Regular season	Playoffs	Avg. attendance
1975	NASL indoor	1	1	—	2	2nd, Tournament Region 2	Did not qualify	2,682
1975	NASL	6	16	—	61	5th, Northern Division	Did not qualify	3,720
1976	NASL	12	12	—	107	4th, Atlantic Conference, Northern Division	Did not qualify	3,420
1977	NASL	7	19	—	72	5th, Atlantic Conference, Northern Division	Did not qualify	3,902
