= A.D. Sagrada Familia =

Costa Rican football club

Sagrada Familia
- Full name: Asociación Deportiva Sagrada Familia
- Founded: 14 April 1967; 57 years ago
- Ground: Estadio Teodoro Picado, San José
- Capacity: 1,000
Home colours

Asociación Deportiva Sagrada Familia is a Costa Rican football club. They are based in a southern suburb of Costa Rica's capital San José.

== History ==
Founded in April 1967, they won promotion to the Segunda División in 1975 and to Primera División in 1981. They played their first match in the top flight on 28 February 1982 against San Carlos.

They spent a total of 6 seasons in the Primera División. They played their last season in the top tier in 1994–95.

In the 2010/11 season, they were named Municipal Sagrada Familia, after a cooperation with the Municipality of San José, and played their home games at the González Víquez. In April 2011 they appealed to get Barrio México punished for using manager Rodrigo Cordero who was not eligible to lead that team, in a bid to avoid the upcoming relegation to the Tercera Division.

== Honours ==
=== National ===
- Segunda División de Costa Rica: 2

1981, 1994

- Tercera División de Costa Rica: 1

1975
