= Football at the Central American and Caribbean Games =

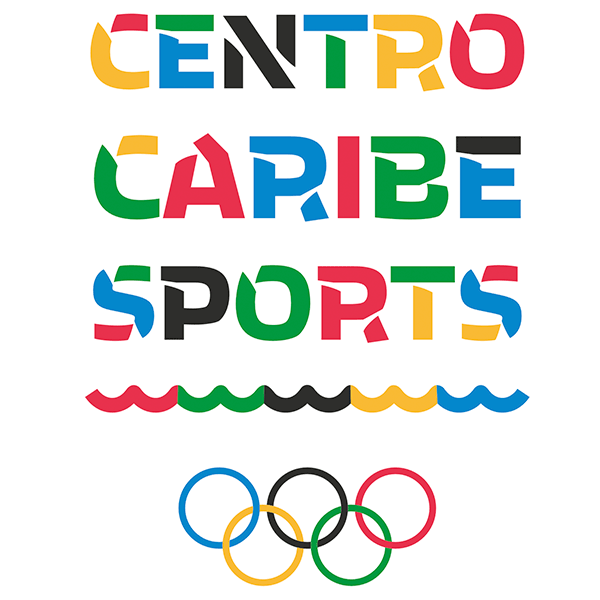
- Organiser(s): CCS
- Founded: Men: 1930; 96 years ago Women: 2010; 16 years ago
- Region: Central America; Caribbean
- Teams: 8 (men and women)
- Related competitions: Pan American Games; Central American Games
- Current champions: Men: Venezuela (3rd title); Women: Mexico (3rd title)
- Most championships: Men: Mexico (7 titles); Women: Mexico (3 titles)
- Football at the 2026 Central American and Caribbean Games

Football at the Central American and Caribbean Games is an association football competition organized by Centro Caribe Sports in the regional multi-sport event of the Central American and Caribbean Games. The men's tournament has been played since 1930, only four editions were played with senior national teams (1930, 1935, 1938 and 1946). The women's tournament has been played since 2010, it is for senior national teams.

== Results ==
=== Men's tournament ===
Year	Host city	Gold	Results	Silver	Bronze	Results	Fourth place	Top goalscorer(s)
Senior teams
1930	(Cuba) Havana	Cuba	Robin-Round	Costa Rica	Honduras	Robin-Round	El Salvador	(Costa Rica) Rafael Madrigal (11)
1935	(El Salvador) San Salvador	Mexico	Robin-Round	Costa Rica	El Salvador	Robin-Round	Cuba	(Costa Rica) Emmanuel Amador (10) (Mexico) Hilario López (10)
1938	Panama City	Mexico	Robin-Round	Costa Rica	Colombia	Robin-Round	El Salvador	(Costa Rica) Hernán Bolaños (10)
1946	(Colombia) Barranquilla	Colombia	Robin-Round	Panama	Curaçao	Robin-Round	Costa Rica	(Costa Rica) Gonzalo Fernández (9) (Colony of Curaçao and Dependencies) Maximiliano Juliana (9)
Olympic teams (amateur)
1950	Guatemala City	Curaçao	Robin-Round	Guatemala	Honduras	Robin-Round	El Salvador	(Guatemala) Mario Camposeco (5)
1954	Mexico City	El Salvador	Robin-Round	Mexico	Colombia	Robin-Round	Panama	(Colombia) Fernando Rengifo (4)
1959	(Venezuela) Caracas	Mexico	Robin-Round	Netherlands Antilles	Venezuela	Robin-Round	Panama	(Netherlands Antilles) Erno Jansen (8)
1962	(Jamaica) Kingston	Netherlands Antilles	Robin-Round	Mexico	Venezuela	Robin-Round	Jamaica	(Netherlands Antilles) Ruben Brandborg (6) (Mexico) Javier Fragoso (6)
1966	(Puerto Rico) San Juan	Mexico	Robin-Round	Netherlands Antilles	Cuba	Robin-Round	El Salvador	(Netherlands Antilles) Feliz Angelico Perez (6)
1970	Panama City	Cuba	Robin-Round	Netherlands Antilles	Venezuela	Robin-Round	Jamaica	(Cuba) José Verdecia (9)
1974	(Dominican Republic) Santo Domingo	Cuba	1–1 (3–0 p)	Trinidad and Tobago	Bermuda	3–0	Mexico	(Bermuda) Ralph Bean (9)
1978	(Colombia) Medellín	Cuba	2–0 (a.e.t.)	Venezuela	Bermuda	3–0	Mexico	(Bermuda) Ralph Bean (7) (Cuba) Roberto Pereira (7)
1982	(Cuba) Havana	Venezuela	1–0	Mexico	Cuba	2–1	Bermuda	–
1986	(Dominican Republic) Santo Domingo	Cuba	1–1 (4–2 p)	Honduras	Mexico	2–1	Dominican Republic	–
Olympic teams (U-23)
1990	Mexico City	Mexico	3–0	Venezuela	Costa Rica	2–1	Cuba	–
U-20 teams
1993	(Puerto Rico) Arroyo	Costa Rica	2–0	Mexico	Jamaica	3–1	Cuba	–
Olympic teams (U-21)
1998	(Venezuela) Maracaibo	Venezuela	3–1	Mexico	Costa Rica	6–1	Trinidad and Tobago	–
2002	(El Salvador) San Salvador	El Salvador	1–1 (4–3 p)	Mexico	Costa Rica	0–0 (4–1 p)	Haiti	(Mexico) Juan Carlos Cacho (3)
2006	(Colombia) Cartagena	Colombia	2–1	Venezuela	Costa Rica	1–0	Honduras	(Costa Rica) Kenny Cunningham (5) (Colombia) Juan Pablo Pino (5)
2010	(Puerto Rico) Mayagüez	The tournament was not held						
2014	(Mexico) Veracruz	Mexico	4–1	Venezuela	Cuba	3–1 (a.e.t.)	Honduras	(Honduras) Eddie Hernández (6)
2018	(Colombia) Barranquilla	Colombia	2–1	Venezuela	Honduras	3–0	Haiti	(Colombia) Julián Quiñones (4)
Olympic teams (U-22)
2023	(El Salvador) Santa Tecla	Mexico	2–1	Costa Rica	Honduras	2–1	El Salvador	(Mexico) Ettson Ayón (3) (Costa Rica) Kenneth Vargas (3)

=== Women's tournament ===
Year	Host city	Gold	Results	Silver	Bronze	Results	Fourth place	Top goalscorer(s)
Senior teams
2010	(Puerto Rico) Mayagüez	Venezuela	Robin-Round	Trinidad and Tobago	Guatemala	Robin-Round	Haiti	–
2014	(Mexico) Veracruz	Mexico	2–0	Colombia	Costa Rica	3–2 (a.e.t.)	Venezuela	(Mexico) Charlyn Corral (5)
2018	(Colombia) Barranquilla	Mexico	3–1	Costa Rica	Venezuela	1–0	Trinidad and Tobago	(Mexico) Charlyn Corral (3) (Mexico) Katie Johnson (3) (Mexico) Mónica Ocampo (3)
2023	(El Salvador) Santa Tecla	Mexico	2–1 (a.e.t.)	Venezuela	El Salvador	2–1	Centro Caribe Sports	(Venezuela) Deyna Castellanos (5)

== Performances ==
=== Men's medals ===
Team	Gold	Silver	Bronze	Total
Mexico	7 (1935, 1938, 1959, 1966, 1990, 2014, 2023)	6 (1954, 1962, 1982, 1993, 1998, 2002)	1 (1986)	14
Cuba	5 (1930, 1970, 1974, 1978, 1986)	–	3 (1966, 1982, 2014)	8
Colombia	3 (1946, 2006, 2018)	–	3 (1938, 1954, 1970)	6
Venezuela	2 (1982, 1998)	5 (1978, 1990, 2006, 2014, 2018)	2 (1959, 1962)	9
Curaçao/Netherlands Antilles	2 (1950, 1962)	3 (1959, 1966, 1970)	1 (1946)	6
El Salvador	2 (1954, 2002)	–	1 (1935)	3
Costa Rica	1 (1993)	4 (1930, 1935, 1938, 2023)	4 (1990, 1998, 2002, 2006)	9
Honduras	–	1 (1986)	4 (1930, 1950, 2018, 2023)	5
Panama	–	1 (1946)	–	1
Guatemala	–	1 (1950)	–	1
Trinidad and Tobago	–	1 (1974)	–	1
Bermuda	–	–	2 (1974, 1978)	2
Jamaica	–	–	1 (1993)	1

Notes

Italic — Hosts

=== Women's medals ===
Team	Gold	Silver	Bronze	Total
Mexico	3 (2014, 2018, 2023)	–	–	3
Venezuela	1 (2010)	1 (2023)	1 (2018)	3
Costa Rica	–	1 (2018)	1 (2014)	2
Colombia	–	1 (2014)	–	1
Trinidad and Tobago	–	1 (2010)	–	1
Guatemala	–	–	1 (2010)	1
El Salvador	–	–	1 (2023)	1

Notes

Italic — Hosts

== Player records ==
=== Top goalscorers (until 1974) ===
Rank	Name	Team	Goals	Tournament(s)
1	(Costa Rica) Hernán Bolaños	Costa Rica	15	1930(5) and 1938(10)
2	(Panama) James Santiago Anderson	Panama	12	1938(5) and 1946(7)
3	(Costa Rica) Rafael Madrigal	Costa Rica	11	1930(11)
3	(Guatemala) Mario Camposeco	Guatemala	11	1946(6) and 1950(5)
5	(Costa Rica) Emmanuel Amador	Costa Rica	10	1935(10)
5	(Mexico) Hilario López	Mexico	10	1935(10)
7	(Costa Rica) Gonzalo Fernández	Costa Rica	9	1946(9)
7	(Netherlands Antilles) Maximiliano Juliana	Curaçao	9	1946(9)
7	(Cuba) José Verdecia	Cuba	9	1970(9)
7	(Bermuda) Ralph Bean	Bermuda	9	1974(9)
11	(Netherlands Antilles) Erno Jansen	Netherlands Antilles	8	1959(8)
12	(El Salvador) Miguel Cruz	El Salvador	7	1935(6) and 1938(1)
12	(Netherlands Antilles) Felix Angelico Perez	Netherlands Antilles	7	1962(1) and 1966(6)
12	(Cuba) Francisco Piedra	Cuba	7	1974(7)

=== Hat-tricks (until 1974) ===
Since the first official tournament in 1930 until the edition in 1974, 40 hat-tricks have been scored in over 100 matches of the 11 editions of the tournament in-between that period. The first hat-trick was scored by Rafael Madrigal of Costa Rica, playing against Guatemala on 17 March 1930; and the last was by Martín Zúñiga of Mexico, playing against Jamaica on 22 November 2014. The record number of hat-tricks in a single Central American and Caribbean Games is ten, during the 1946 edition. The only player to have scored three hat-tricks is Costa Rica's Hernán Bolaños, one in the inaugural edition in 1930 and two in 1938, in which he was the top goal scorer with 10 goals. He is closely followed by Rafael Madrigal, Hilario López, Emmanuel Amador, Gonzalo Fernández, José Verdecia and Francisco Piedra with two hat-tricks each. The record for the most goals scored in a single Central American and Caribbean Game is 7, which has been achieved once: by Maximiliano Juliana when he scored 7 for Netherlands Antilles in a 14-0 win over Puerto Rico. Puerto Rico also holds the record for most hat-tricks conceded with 15, with the next closest being Honduras and Guatemala with 6. On the other hand, Costa Rica holds the record for most hat-tricks scored with 11, with the next closest being Cuba with 7.

=== List ===
Far Eastern Championship Games hat-tricks
#	Player	G	Time of goals	For	Result	Against	Tournament	Date	report
1.	Daniel Bustillo	3	?', ?', ?'	Honduras	5–4	Jamaica	1930 Central American and Caribbean Games	18 March 1930	Report
2.	Mario López	3	7', 15', ?'	Cuba	7–0	Honduras	1930 Central American and Caribbean Games	20 March 1930	Report
3.	Rafael Madrigal	4	10', 16'(pen.)), 43', 78'	Costa Rica	8–1	Guatemala	1930 Central American and Caribbean Games	17 March 1930	Report
4.	Gustavo Marroquín	3	2', 10', 62'	El Salvador	8–2	Guatemala	1930 Central American and Caribbean Games	19 March 1930	Report
5.	Mario Calvo	3	13', 35', 40'	El Salvador	8–2	Guatemala	1930 Central American and Caribbean Games	19 March 1930	Report
6.	Hernán Bolaños	3	?', ?', ?'	Costa Rica	9–2	El Salvador	1930 Central American and Caribbean Games	22 March 1930	Report
7.	Enrique Ferrer	3	46', 48', ?'	Cuba	5-0	Honduras	1930 Central American and Caribbean Games	23 March 1930	Report
8.	Rafael Madrigal (2)	3	?', ?', ?'	Costa Rica	8-0	Honduras	1930 Central American and Caribbean Games	4 April 1930	Report
9.	Hilario López	3	73', 80', 86'	Mexico	8–1	El Salvador	1935 Central American and Caribbean Games	27 March 1935	Report
10.	Emmanuel Amador	3	4', 14', 51'	Costa Rica	6–1	El Salvador	1935 Central American and Caribbean Games	30 March 1935	Report
11.	Hilario López (2)	3	8', 55', 80'	Mexico	8–2	Honduras	1935 Central American and Caribbean Games	1 April 1935	Report
12.	Julio Lores	3	26', 42', 73'	Mexico	8–2	Honduras	1935 Central American and Caribbean Games	1 April 1935	Report
13.	Emmanuel Amador (2)	4	15', 25', ?', ?'	Costa Rica	6–0	Honduras	1935 Central American and Caribbean Games	3 April 1935	Report
14.	Hernán Bolaños (2)	3	5', 55', 83'	Costa Rica	7–0	El Salvador	1938 Central American and Caribbean Games	12 February 1938	Report
15.	Hernán Bolaños (3)	5	14', 15', 23', 43', 59'	Costa Rica	11–0	Panama	1938 Central American and Caribbean Games	16 February 1938	Report
16.	Gonzalo Fernández	4	?', ?', ?', ?'	Costa Rica	12–0	Puerto Rico	1946 Central American and Caribbean Games	10 December 1946	Report
17.	José Manuel Retana	3	?', ?', ?'	Costa Rica	12–0	Puerto Rico	1946 Central American and Caribbean Games	10 December 1946	Report
18.	Jesús María Araya	3	?', ?', ?'	Costa Rica	12–0	Puerto Rico	1946 Central American and Caribbean Games	10 December 1946	Report
19.	James Santiago Anderson	3	?', ?', ?'	Panama	12–1	Puerto Rico	1946 Central American and Caribbean Games	13 December 1946	Report
20.	Carlos Martinez	3	?', ?', ?'	Panama	12–1	Puerto Rico	1946 Central American and Caribbean Games	13 December 1946	Report
21.	Octavio Carrillo	3	3', 44', 80'	Colombia	12–1	Guatemala	1946 Central American and Caribbean Games	15 December 1946	Report
22.	Maximiliano Juliana	7	?', ?', ?', ?', ?', ?', ?'	Netherlands Antilles	14–0	Puerto Rico	1946 Central American and Caribbean Games	15 December 1946	Report
23.	Gonzalo Fernández (2)	3	?', ?', ?'	Costa Rica	6–0	Guatemala	1946 Central American and Caribbean Games	16 December 1946	Report
24.	Andrés Sucre	3	10', 25', 28'	Venezuela	3–2	Guatemala	1946 Central American and Caribbean Games	18 December 1946	Report
25.	Víctor García	3	37', 60', 68'	Venezuela	6–0	Puerto Rico	1946 Central American and Caribbean Games	20 December 1946	Report
26.	Carlos Calderón de la Barca	3	11', 64', 66'	Mexico	4–0	Panama	1954 Central American and Caribbean Games	10 March 1954	Report
27.	Erno Jansen	5	8', 48', 53', 65', 84'	Netherlands Antilles	15–0	Puerto Rico	1959 Central American and Caribbean Games	7 January 1959	Report
28.	Wilhelm Canword	3	29', 56', 88'	Netherlands Antilles	15–0	Puerto Rico	1959 Central American and Caribbean Games	7 January 1959	Report
29.	José Ángel Vidal	3	53', 66', 79'	Venezuela	7–0	Puerto Rico	1959 Central American and Caribbean Games	16 January 1959	Report
30.	José Luis Estrada	3	50', 64', 82'(pen.))	Mexico	8–0	Puerto Rico	1962 Central American and Caribbean Games	15 August 1962	Report
31.	Ruben Brandborg	3	25', 30', 80'	Netherlands Antilles	4–0	Puerto Rico	1962 Central American and Caribbean Games	17 August 1962	Report
32.	Javier Fragoso	3	?', ?', ?'	Mexico	6–0	Cuba	1962 Central American and Caribbean Games	17 August 1962	Report
33.	Peter Chavannes	3	8', 13', ?'	Jamaica	6–1	Cuba	1962 Central American and Caribbean Games	24 August 1962	Report
34.	José Verdecia	3	38', 82', 87'	Cuba	4–3	Panama	1970 Central American and Caribbean Games	4 March 1970	Report
35.	José Verdecia (2)	3	10', 44', 87'	Cuba	4–0	Nicaragua	1970 Central American and Caribbean Games	7 March 1970	Report
36.	Francisco Piedra	3	5', 48', 63'	Cuba	8–0	Puerto Rico	1974 Central American and Caribbean Games	4 March 1970	Report
37.	Andrés Roldán	3	18', 29', 69'	Cuba	8–0	Puerto Rico	1974 Central American and Caribbean Games	4 March 1970	Report
38.	Francisco Piedra (2)	3	40', 43', 70'	Cuba	5–0	Nicaragua	1974 Central American and Caribbean Games	8 March 1974	Report
39.	Noel Llewelyn	3	18', 40', 69'	Trinidad and Tobago	4–0	Puerto Rico	1974 Central American and Caribbean Games	8 March 1974	Report
40.	Ralph Bean	3	17', 65', 88'	Bermuda	3–0	Bahamas	1974 Central American and Caribbean Games	8 March 1974	Report

== See also ==
- Football at the Pan American Games
- Football at the Central American Games
- Football at the South American Games
- Football at the Bolivarian Games
