= Haiti national under-23 football team =

Haiti
- Nickname(s): Les Grenadiers; Le Rouge et Bleu; Les Bicolores; La Sélection Nationale
- Association: Fédération Haïtienne de Football
- Confederation: CONCACAF
- Sub-confederation: CFU (Caribbean)
- Head coach: Webens Princimé
- Home stadium: Stade Sylvio Cator
- FIFA code: HAI
First colours	Second colours

The Haiti national under-23 football team represents Haiti in international football competitions and qualifications for the Olympic Games. The selection is limited to players under the age of 23, except three overage players. The team is controlled by the Fédération Haïtienne de Football (FHF).

== Competitive record ==
=== Olympic Games ===
Olympics record
Year	Result	Position	Pld	W	D*	L	GF	GA
1896 to 1988	See Haiti national football team							
1992 to 2024	Did not qualify							
Total		0/8						

=== Pan American Games ===
Pan American Games record
Year	Result	Position	Pld	W	D*	L	GF	GA
1951 to 1995	See Haiti national football team							
(Canada) 1999	Did not participate							
(Dominican Republic) 2003	Did not participate							
(Brazil) 2007	Group stage	10th	3	0	1	2	1	6
(Mexico) 2011	Did not participate							
(Canada) 2015	Did not participate							
(Peru) 2019	Did not participate							
(Chile) 2023	To be determined							
Total	Group stage	1/6	3	0	1	2	1	6

=== Central American and Caribbean Games ===
Central American and Caribbean Games record
Year	Result	Position	Pld	W	D*	L	GF	GA
1930 to 1986	See Haiti national football team							
(Mexico) 1990	Did not enter							
Since 1993	See Haiti national under-20 football team							
Total		0/1						

== Players ==
=== Current squad ===
The following 20 players were called up for the 2020 CONCACAF Men's Olympic Qualifying Championship.

No.	Pos.	Player	Date of birth (age)	Club
	GK	Marc-Emy Florestal	6 January 2004 (aged 17)	(Haitian Football Federation) Baltimore
	GK	Alan Jérome	22 August 2000 (aged 20)	(Haitian Football Federation) Don Bosco
	GK	Alexandre Pierre	25 February 2001 (aged 20)	(French Football Federation) Strasbourg
	DF	Djimy Alexis	8 October 1997 (aged 23)	(Football Federation of Armenia) Lori
	DF	Odilon Jérôme	7 December 1999 (aged 21)	(Haitian Football Federation) Don Bosco
	DF	Wendy St. Felix	1 October 1997 (aged 23)	(Haitian Football Federation) Real Hope
	DF	Martin Expérience	9 March 1999 (aged 22)	(French Football Federation) Avranches
	DF	Sébastien Lauture	7 April 2000 (aged 20)	(Royal Spanish Football Federation) Cultural Leonesa
	DF	Denilson Pierre	21 January 1998 (aged 23)	(Haitian Football Federation) Violette
	DF	Francois Dulysse	13 April 1999 (aged 21)	(United States Soccer Federation) New England Revolution II
	MF	Bicou Bissainthe	15 March 1999 (aged 22)	(Haitian Football Federation) Real Hope
	MF	Eliader Dorlus	12 November 1997 (aged 23)	(Haitian Football Federation) Don Bosco
	MF	Sheelove Archelus	25 September 1999 (aged 21)	(Danish Football Association) Næstved Boldklub
	MF	Christopher Attys	13 March 2001 (aged 20)	(Italian Football Federation) Inter Milan
	MF	Dutherson Clerveaux	29 January 1999 (aged 22)	(Haitian Football Federation) Cavaly
	MF	Emmanuel François	25 January 2000 (aged 21)	(French Football Federation) Rodez
	MF	Danley Jean Jacques	20 May 2000 (aged 20)	(Haitian Football Federation) Don Bosco
	FW	Karl Andy Bell	20 December 1997 (aged 23)	(Royal Spanish Football Federation) La Virgen del Camino
	FW	Roberto Louima	3 April 1997 (aged 23)	(Haitian Football Federation) Violette
	FW	Peterson Joseph	17 December 1997 (aged 23)	(Haitian Football Federation) Tempête

== Honours ==
Friendly competitions

- Copa de Las Antillas
  - Winners (1): 2002

== See also ==
- Haiti national football team
- Haiti national under-20 football team
- Haiti national under-17 football team
- Haiti national under-15 football team
