= Mexico national football team records and statistics =

This is a list of the Mexico national football team's records and statistics.

== Individual records ==
=== Player records ===
As of 5 July 2026
Players in bold are still active with Mexico.

==== Most capped players ====
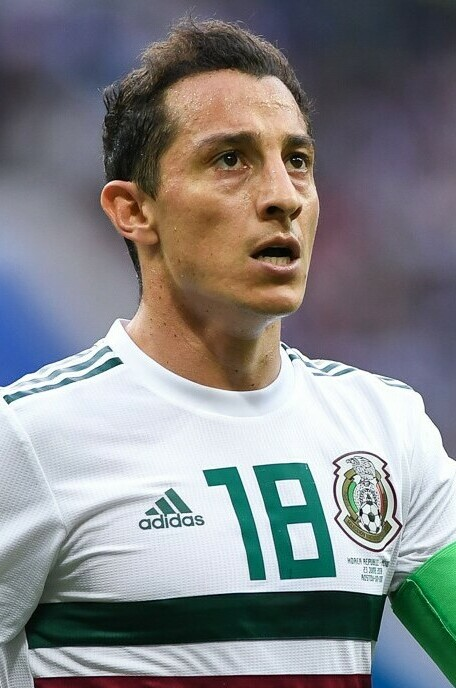
Andrés Guardado is the most capped player in the history of Mexico with 180 caps.

Rank	Player	Caps	Goals	Career
1	Andrés Guardado	180	28	2005–2024
2	Claudio Suárez	178	7	1992–2006
3	Guillermo Ochoa	153	0	2005–2026
4	Pável Pardo	147	11	1996–2009
4	Rafael Márquez	147	17	1997–2018
6	Gerardo Torrado	144	5	1999–2013
7	Héctor Moreno	132	5	2007–2023
8	Jorge Campos	129	0	1991–2003
9	**Raúl Jiménez**	128	48	2013–present
10	**Jesús Gallardo**	126	3	2016–present

==== Top goalscorers ====
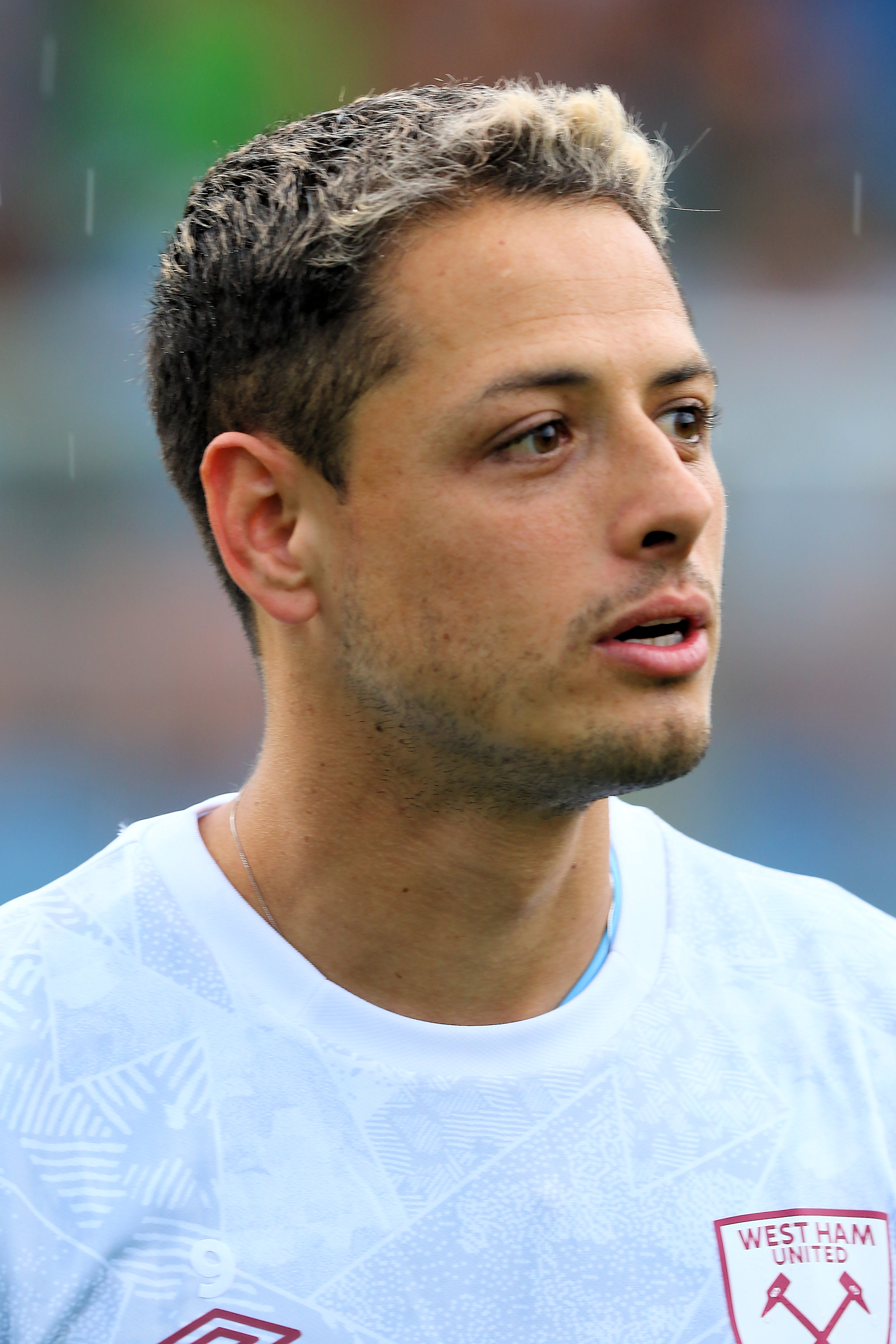
Javier Hernández is Mexico's all-time top scorer with 52 goals.

Rank	Player	Goals	Caps	Average	Career
1	Javier Hernández (list)	52	109	0.48	2009–2019
2	**Raúl Jiménez**	48	128	0.38	2013–present
3	Jared Borgetti (list)	46	89	0.52	1997–2008
4	Cuauhtémoc Blanco	38	119	0.32	1995–2014
5	Luis Hernández	35	85	0.41	1995–2002
6	Carlos Hermosillo	34	90	0.38	1984–1997
7	Enrique Borja	31	65	0.48	1966–1975
8	Luís Roberto Alves	30	84	0.36	1988–2001
9	Hugo Sánchez	29	58	0.5	1977–1998
10	Luis García	28	77	0.36	1991–1999
10	Andrés Guardado	28	180	0.16	2005–2024

== Competition records ==
For the all-time record of the national team against opposing nations, see the team's all-time record page.

=== FIFA World Cup ===
FIFA World Cup record										Qualification record					
Year	Round	Position	Pld	W	D*	L	GF	GA	Squad	Pld	W	D	L	GF	GA
(Uruguay) 1930	Group stage	13th	3	0	0	3	4	13	Squad	Qualified as invitees					
(Italy) 1934	Did not qualify									4	3	0	1	14	7
(France) 1938	Withdrew									Withdrew					
(Brazil) 1950	Group stage	12th	3	0	0	3	2	10	Squad	4	4	0	0	17	2
(Switzerland) 1954	Group stage	13th	2	0	0	2	2	8	Squad	4	4	0	0	19	1
(Sweden) 1958	Group stage	16th	3	0	1	2	1	8	Squad	6	5	1	0	21	3
(Chile) 1962	Group stage	11th	3	1	0	2	3	4	Squad	8	4	3	1	18	5
(England) 1966	Group stage	12th	3	0	2	1	1	3	Squad	8	6	2	0	20	4
(Mexico) 1970	Quarter-finals	6th	4	2	1	1	6	4	Squad	Qualified as hosts					
(West Germany) 1974	Did not qualify									9	6	2	1	18	8
(Argentina) 1978	Group stage	16th	3	0	0	3	2	12	Squad	9	6	2	1	23	6
(Spain) 1982	Did not qualify									9	2	5	2	14	8
(Mexico) 1986	Quarter-finals	6th	5	3	2	0	6	2	Squad	Qualified as hosts					
(Italy) 1990	Banned									Disqualified					
(United States) 1994	Round of 16	13th	4	1	2	1	4	4	Squad	12	9	1	2	39	8
(France) 1998	Round of 16	13th	4	1	2	1	8	7	Squad	16	8	6	2	37	13
(South Korea) (Japan) 2002	Round of 16	11th	4	2	1	1	4	4	Squad	16	9	3	4	33	11
(Germany) 2006	Round of 16	15th	4	1	1	2	5	5	Squad	18	15	1	2	67	10
(South Africa) 2010	Round of 16	14th	4	1	1	2	4	5	Squad	18	11	2	5	36	18
(Brazil) 2014	Round of 16	10th	4	2	1	1	5	3	Squad	18	10	5	3	31	14
(Russia) 2018	Round of 16	12th	4	2	0	2	3	6	Squad	16	11	4	1	29	8
(Qatar) 2022	Group stage	22nd	3	1	1	1	2	3	Squad	14	8	4	2	17	8
(Canada) (Mexico) (United States) 2026	Round of 16	9th	5	4	0	1	10	3	Squad	Qualified as co-hosts					
Total	Quarter-finals	18/23	65	21	15	29	72	104	—	189	121	41	27	453	134

FIFA World Cup history
First match	France 4–1 Mexico (13 July 1930; Montevideo, Uruguay)
Biggest win	Mexico 4–0 El Salvador (7 June 1970; Mexico City, Mexico)
Biggest defeat	West Germany 6–0 Mexico (6 June 1978; Córdoba, Argentina)
Best result	Quarter-finals (1970, 1986)
Worst result	Group stage (1930, 1950, 1954, 1958, 1962, 1966, 1978, 2022)

=== CONCACAF Gold Cup ===
CONCACAF Championship & Gold Cup record										Qualification record					
Year	Round	Position	Pld	W	D*	L	GF	GA	Squad	Pld	W	D	L	GF	GA
(El Salvador) 1963	Group stage	7th	3	1	1	1	9	2	Squad	Qualified automatically					
(Guatemala) 1965	Champions	1st	5	4	1	0	13	2	Squad	Automatically entered					
(Honduras) 1967	Runners-up	2nd	5	4	0	1	10	1	Squad	Qualified as defending champions					
(Costa Rica) 1969	Fourth place	4th	5	1	2	2	4	5	Squad	2	1	0	1	4	2
(Trinidad and Tobago) 1971	Champions	1st	5	4	1	0	6	1	Squad	2	2	0	0	6	0
(Haiti) 1973	Third place	3rd	5	2	2	1	10	5	Squad	4	4	0	0	8	3
(Mexico) 1977	Champions	1st	5	5	0	0	20	5	Squad	4	1	2	1	3	1
(Honduras) 1981	Third place	3rd	5	1	3	1	6	3	Squad	4	1	2	1	8	5
1985	Withdrew to host the 1986 FIFA World Cup									Withdrew					
1989	Banned									Banned					
(United States) 1991	Third place	3rd	5	3	1	1	10	5	Squad	Qualified automatically					
(Mexico) (United States) 1993	Champions	1st	5	4	1	0	28	2	Squad	Qualified automatically					
(United States) 1996	Champions	1st	4	4	0	0	9	0	Squad	Qualified automatically					
(United States) 1998	Champions	1st	4	4	0	0	8	2	Squad	Qualified automatically					
(United States) 2000	Quarter-finals	7th	3	1	1	1	6	3	Squad	Qualified automatically					
(United States) 2002	Quarter-finals	5th	3	2	1	0	4	1	Squad	Qualified automatically					
(Mexico) (United States) 2003	Champions	1st	5	4	1	0	9	0	Squad	Qualified automatically					
(United States) 2005	Quarter-finals	6th	4	2	0	2	7	4	Squad	Qualified automatically					
(United States) 2007	Runners-up	2nd	6	4	0	2	7	5	Squad	Qualified automatically					
(United States) 2009	Champions	1st	6	5	1	0	15	2	Squad	Qualified automatically					
(United States) 2011	Champions	1st	6	6	0	0	22	4	Squad	Qualified automatically					
(United States) 2013	Semi-finals	3rd	5	3	0	2	8	5	Squad	Qualified automatically					
(Canada) (United States) 2015	Champions	1st	6	4	2	0	16	6	Squad	Qualified automatically					
(United States) 2017	Semi-finals	3rd	5	3	1	1	6	2	Squad	Qualified automatically					
(United States) (Costa Rica) (Jamaica) 2019	Champions	1st	6	5	1	0	16	4	Squad	Qualified automatically					
(United States) 2021	Runners-up	2nd	6	4	1	1	9	2	Squad	4	4	0	0	13	3
(Canada) (United States) 2023	Champions	1st	6	5	0	1	13	2	Squad	4	2	2	0	8	3
Total	12 Titles	25/27	123	85	21	17	271	73		24	15	6	3	50	17

CONCACAF Championship & Gold Cup history
First match	Netherlands Antilles 2–1 Mexico (24 March 1963; Santa Ana, El Salvador)
Biggest win	Mexico 9–0 Martinique (11 July 1993; Mexico City, Mexico)
Biggest defeat	Trinidad and Tobago 4–0 Mexico (14 December 1973; Port-au-Prince, Haiti)
Best result	Champions (1965, 1971, 1977, 1993, 1996, 1998, 2003, 2009, 2011, 2015, 2019, 2023)
Worst result	7th (1963, Quarter-finals 2000)

=== CONCACAF Nations League ===
CONCACAF Nations League record
League phase											Knockout phase							
Season	Div	Pos.	P/R	Pld	W	D	L	GF	GA	Rank	Finals	Pos.	Pld	W	D	L	GF	GA
2019–20	A	1st	Same position	4	4	0	0	13	3	1st	(United States) 2021	Runners-up	2	0	1	1	2	3
2022–23	A	1st	Same position	4	2	2	0	8	3	4th	(United States) 2023	Third place	2	1	0	1	1	3
2023–24	Bye		Same position	N/A							(United States) 2024	Runners-up	4	2	0	2	5	4
2024–25	Bye		Same position	N/A							(United States) 2025	Champions	4	3	0	1	8	3
Total				8	6	2	0	21	6	—	Total	1 Title	12	6	1	5	16	13

CONCACAF Nations League history
First match	Bermuda 1–5 Mexico (11 October 2019; Hamilton, Bermuda)
Biggest win	Bermuda 1–5 Mexico (11 October 2019; Hamilton, Bermuda); Mexico 4–0 Honduras (19 November 2024; Toluca, Mexico)
Biggest defeat	United States 3–0 Mexico (15 June 2023; Paradise, United States)
Best result	Champions (2024–25)
Worst result	Third place (2022–23)

=== Copa América ===
Copa América record
Year	Round	Position	Pld	W	D*	L	GF	GA	Squad
(Ecuador) 1993	Runners-up	2nd	6	2	2	2	8	7	Squad
(Uruguay) 1995	Quarter-finals	7th	4	1	2	1	5	4	Squad
(Bolivia) 1997	Third place	3rd	6	2	2	2	8	9	Squad
(Paraguay) 1999	Third place	3rd	6	3	1	2	10	9	Squad
(Colombia) 2001	Runners-up	2nd	6	3	1	2	7	5	Squad
(Peru) 2004	Quarter-finals	6th	4	2	1	1	5	7	Squad
(Venezuela) 2007	Third place	3rd	6	4	1	1	13	5	Squad
(Argentina) 2011	Group stage	12th	3	0	0	3	1	4	Squad
(Chile) 2015	Group stage	11th	3	0	2	1	4	5	Squad
(United States) 2016	Quarter-finals	7th	4	2	1	1	6	9	Squad
(Brazil) 2019	Not invited								
(Brazil) 2021	Not invited								
(United States) 2024	Group stage	9th	3	1	1	1	1	1	Squad
Total	Runners-up	11/13	51	20	14	17	67	63	—

Copa América history
First match	Colombia 2–1 Mexico (16 June 1993; Machala, Ecuador)
Biggest win	Mexico 6–0 Paraguay (8 July 2007; Maturín, Venezuela)
Biggest defeat	Mexico 0–7 Chile (18 June 2016; Santa Clara, United States)
Best result	Runners-up (1993, 2001)
Worst result	Group stage (2011, 2015, 2024)

=== FIFA Confederations Cup ===
FIFA Confederations Cup record
Year	Round	Position	Pld	W	D*	L	GF	GA	Squad
(Saudi Arabia) 1992	Did not qualify								
(Saudi Arabia) 1995	Third place	3rd	3	1	2	0	4	2	Squad
(Saudi Arabia) 1997	Group stage	5th	3	1	0	2	8	6	Squad
(Mexico) 1999	Champions	1st	5	4	1	0	13	6	Squad
(South Korea) (Japan) 2001	Group stage	8th	3	0	0	3	1	8	Squad
(France) 2003	Did not qualify								
(Germany) 2005	Fourth place	4th	5	2	2	1	7	6	Squad
(South Africa) 2009	Did not qualify								
(Brazil) 2013	Group stage	6th	3	1	0	2	3	5	Squad
(Russia) 2017	Fourth place	4th	5	2	1	2	8	10	Squad
Total	1 title	7/10	27	11	6	10	44	43	—

FIFA Confederations Cup history
First match	Saudi Arabia 2–1 Mexico (6 January 1995; Riyadh, Saudi Arabia)
Biggest win	Saudi Arabia 0–5 Mexico (14 December 1997; Riyadh, Saudi Arabia)
Biggest defeat	France 4–0 Mexico (3 June 2001; Ulsan, South Korea)
Best result	Champions (1999)
Worst result	Group stage (1997, 2001, 2013)

=== Olympic Games ===
Olympic Games record
Year	Round	Position	Pld	W	D*	L	GF	GA	Squad
(Netherlands) 1928	First round	14th	2	0	0	2	2	10	Squad
(United Kingdom) 1948	First round	11th	1	0	0	1	3	5	Squad
(Finland) 1952	Did not qualify								
(Australia) 1956	Did not qualify								
(Italy) 1960	Did not qualify								
(Japan) 1964	Group stage	11th	3	0	1	2	2	6	Squad
(Mexico) 1968	Fourth place	4th	5	3	0	2	10	7	Squad
(West Germany) 1972	Second group stage	7th	6	2	1	3	4	14	Squad
(Canada) 1976	Group stage	9th	3	0	2	1	4	7	Squad
(Soviet Union) 1980	Did not qualify								
(United States) 1984	Did not qualify								
(South Korea) 1988	Banned								
Since 1992	See Mexico national under-23 football team								
Total	Fourth place	6/13	20	5	4	11	25	49	—

== Head-to-head record ==
The list shown below shows the Mexico national football team's all-time international record against opposing nations. The statistics are composed of FIFA World Cup, FIFA World Cup Qualifying, FIFA Confederations Cup, CONCACAF Gold Cup (including CONCACAF Championship), CONCACAF Cup, Summer Olympics, Copa America, and CONCACAF Nations League matches, as well as international friendly matches.

Key
Positive balance (More wins)
Neutral balance (Wins = Losses)
Negative balance (More losses)

After the match against the Chile on 6 October 2026.

Team	Played	Won	Drawn	Lost	Goals for	Goals against	Goal difference	Last meeting (Note: Mexico's score is listed first.)
Albania	1	1	0	0	4	0	+4	13 March 2002; 4-0
Algeria	2	1	1	0	4	2	+2	13 October 2020; 2-2
Angola	2	1	1	0	1	0	+1	13 May 2010; 1-0
Argentina	32	4	12	16	28	53	-25	26 November 2022; 0-2
Australia	7	2	3	2	10	10	0	30 May 2026; 1-0
Belarus	1	0	0	1	2	3	-1	18 November 2014; 2-3
Belgium	8	3	3	2	10	12	-2	31 March 2026; 1-1
Belize	2	2	0	0	9	0	+9	21 June 2008; 7-0
Bermuda	8	7	0	1	23	4	+19	19 November 2019; 2-1
Bolivia	14	11	2	1	22	5	+17	25 January 2026; 1-0
Bosnia and Herzegovina	4	3	0	1	5	2	+3	31 January 2018; 1-0
Brazil	42	10	7	25	38	78	-40	8 June 2024; 2–3
Bulgaria	13	4	6	3	16	14	+2	16 November 2005; 0-3
Cameroon	3	2	1	0	4	2	+2	10 June 2023; 2-2
Canada	40	25	11	4	89	26	+63	20 March 2025; 2-0
Chile	34	15	6	13	37	44	-7	6 October 2026; 0–2
China	3	3	0	0	7	2	+5	16 April 2008; 1-0
Colombia	30	10	10	10	30	32	–2	26 September 2026; 1-1
Costa Rica	59	32	21	6	88	34	+54	22 June 2025; 0-0
Croatia	6	2	0	4	6	9	-3	27 March 2018; 0-1
Cuba	13	13	0	0	51	6	+45	15 June 2019; 7-0
Curaçao	1	1	0	0	2	0	+2	16 July 2017; 2-0
Czech Republic	2	1	0	1	4	2	+2	24 June 2026; 3–0
DR Congo	1	1	0	0	2	1	+1	12 May 2006; 2-1
Denmark	4	1	1	2	5	6	-1	9 June 2018; 0-2
Dominica	2	2	0	0	18	0	+18	27 June 2004; 8-0
Dominican Republic	1	1	0	0	3	2	+1	14 June 2025; 3–2
Ecuador	29	17	7	5	46	27	+19	30 June 2026; 2–0
Egypt	4	2	1	1	8	4	+4	27 July 1999; 2-2
El Salvador	37	32	1	4	106	20	+86	30 March 2022; 2-0
England	11	2	1	8	6	30	-24	5 July 2026; 2-3
Estonia	1	1	0	0	6	0	+6	9 May 1998; 6-0
Ethiopia	1	1	0	0	3	0	+3	29 September 1968; 3-0
Fiji	1	1	0	0	2	0	+2	30 August 1980; 2-0
Finland	5	4	1	0	11	4	+7	30 October 2013; 4-2
France	7	1	1	5	6	15	-9	17 June 2010; 2-0
Gambia	1	1	0	0	5	1	+4	30 May 2010; 5-1
Germany	13	2	6	5	13	26	-13	17 October 2023; 2-2
Ghana	5	5	0	0	8	1	+7	22 May 2026; 2-0
Greece	4	1	2	1	4	4	0	22 June 2005; 0-0
Guadeloupe	2	2	0	0	3	0	+3	12 July 2009; 2-0
Guatemala	37	24	9	4	74	32	+42	7 June 2023; 2-0
Guinea	1	0	0	0	4	0	+4	17 October 1968; 4-0
Guyana	2	2	0	0	8	1	+7	12 October 2012; 5-0
Haiti	11	9	2	0	30	3	+27	29 June 2023; 3-1
Honduras	51	31	10	10	92	39	+53	2 July 2025; 1–0
Hungary	7	5	1	1	15	6	+9	14 December 2005; 2-0
Iceland	6	4	2	0	10	1	+9	25 February 2026; 4–0
Iran	3	3	0	0	9	2	+7	2 June 2007; 4-0
Iraq	2	2	0	0	5	0	+5	9 November 2022; 4-0
Israel	2	1	0	1	3	1	+2	28 May 2014; 3-0
Italy	12	1	4	7	10	28	-18	16 June 2013; 1-2
Ivory Coast	1	1	0	0	4	1	+3	14 August 2013; 4-1
Jamaica	29	21	5	3	72	15	+57	22 June 2024; 1-0
Japan	8	6	1	1	15	6	+9	6 September 2025; 0–0
Jordan	1	0	1	0	0	0	0	18 October 1985; 0-0
Kuwait	1	0	1	0	0	0	0	25 October 1985; 0-0
Liberia	1	1	0	0	5	4	+1	23 August 2001; 5-4
Libya	1	0	0	1	1	3	-2	11 October 1985; 1-3
Luxembourg	1	0	0	1	1	2	-1	10 April 1969; 1-2
Martinique	3	3	0	0	15	3	+12	23 June 2019; 3-2
Myanmar	1	1	0	0	1	0	+1	30 August 1972; 1-0
Morocco	1	0	0	1	1	2	-1	11 September 1971; 1-2
Netherlands	9	4	1	4	16	15	+1	7 October 2020; 1-0
New Zealand	8	7	0	1	21	9	+12	7 September 2024; 3-0
Nicaragua	3	3	0	0	10	1	+9	5 July 2009; 2-0
Nigeria	7	3	4	0	13	7	+6	28 May 2022; 2-1
North Korea	1	1	0	0	2	1	+1	17 March 2010; 2-1
Northern Ireland	2	1	0	1	4	4	0	11 June 1994; 3-0
Norway	6	3	1	2	11	8	+3	25 January 2006; 2-1
Panama	29	21	6	2	52	16	+36	22 January 2026; 1-0
Paraguay	22	11	5	6	38	19	+19	18 November 2025; 1-2
Peru	29	13	7	9	39	33	+6	29 September 2026; 1-1
Poland	9	3	3	3	13	9	+4	22 November 2022; 0-0
Portugal	6	0	3	3	4	7	-3	28 March 2026; 0-0
Qatar	1	0	0	1	0	1	-1	2 July 2023; 0-1
Republic of Ireland	6	2	4	0	9	6	+3	1 June 2017; 3-1
Romania	2	1	0	1	2	2	0	10 February 1993; 2-0
Russia	4	1	0	3	4	11	-7	24 June 2017; 2-1
Saint Kitts and Nevis	2	2	0	0	13	0	+13	17 November 2004; 8-0
Saint Vincent and the Grenadines	7	7	0	0	36	1	+35	10 October 2004; 1-0
Saudi Arabia	7	6	1	0	18	3	+15	28 June 2025; 2-0
Scotland	1	1	0	0	1	0	+1	2 June 2018; 1-0
Senegal	2	2	0	0	3	0	+3	10 February 2016; 2-0
Serbia	2	2	0	0	7	1	+6	4 June 2026; 5-1
Slovakia	1	1	0	0	5	2	+3	17 May 1996; 5-2
Slovenia	1	0	0	1	1	2	-1	6 December 1995; 1-2
South Africa	5	3	1	1	12	5	+7	11 June 2026; 2-0
South Korea	16	9	3	4	32	20	+12	18 June 2026; 1–0
Spain	8	0	3	5	4	16	-12	11 August 2010; 1-1
Suriname	4	4	0	0	15	1	+14	18 June 2025; 2-0
Sweden	11	2	3	6	6	13	-7	16 November 2022; 1-2
Switzerland	6	1	1	4	9	14	-5	7 June 2025; 2-4
Sudan	1	1	0	0	1	0	+1	28 August 1972; 1-0
Tahiti	1	1	0	0	1	0	+1	2 September 1980; 1-0
Trinidad and Tobago	24	15	6	3	54	22	+32	10 July 2021; 0-0
Tunisia	1	0	0	1	1	3	-2	2 June 1978; 1-3
Turkey	1	1	0	0	1	0	+1	10 June 2025; 1-0
Ukraine	1	1	0	0	2	1	+1	20 October 1993; 2-1
United Arab Emirates	1	0	1	0	2	2	0	22 October 1985; 2-2
United States	80	38	17	25	149	96	+53	3 October 2026; 0–3
Uruguay	24	8	8	8	29	35	-6	15 November 2025; 0-0
Uzbekistan	1	0	1	0	3	3	0	12 September 2023; 3-3
Venezuela	14	10	3	1	30	11	+19	26 June 2024; 0-1
Wales	5	2	2	1	5	3	+2	27 March 2021; 0-1
Yemen	1	1	0	0	2	0	+2	15 October 1985; 2-0
Total	1,008	537	224	247	1781	1033	+768	

=== Record against former nations ===
Team	Played	Won	Drawn	Lost	Goals for	Goals against	Goal difference	Latest meeting
Czechoslovakia	2	1	0	1	4	3	+1	7 June 1962; 3–1
East Germany	4	0	2	2	3	5	-2	15 February 1986; 1–2
Netherlands Antilles	6	3	2	1	23	4	+19	8 December 1973; 8–0
Soviet Union	10	1	7	2	2	6	-4	19 February 1986; 1–0
Yugoslavia	7	1	1	5	8	16	-8	13 February 2002; 1–2
Total	29	6	12	11	40	34	6	

=== Penalty shootouts ===
Team	Match score (PSO score)	Competition	Venue (Date)
Argentina	1–1 (5–6)	2005 FIFA Confederations Cup	(Germany) AWD-Arena, Hanover; 26 June 2005
Bulgaria	1–1 (1–3)	1994 FIFA World Cup	(United States) Giants Stadium, East Rutherford; 5 July 1994
Costa Rica	1–1 (5–3)	2009 CONCACAF Gold Cup	(United States) Soldier Field, Chicago; 23 July 2009
Costa Rica	1–1 (5–4)	2019 CONCACAF Gold Cup	(United States) NRG Stadium, Houston; 29 June 2019
Costa Rica	0–0 (5–4)	2021 CONCACAF Nations League Finals	(United States) Empower Field at Mile High, Denver; 3 June 2021
Denmark	1–1 (2–4)	1995 King Fahd Cup	(Saudi Arabia) King Fahd II Stadium, Riyadh; 10 January 1995
Ecuador	1–1 (4–3)	1997 Copa América	(Bolivia) Estadio Félix Capriles, Cochabamba; 22 June 1997
Germany	0–0 (1–4)	1986 FIFA World Cup	(Mexico) Estadio Universitario, San Nicolás de los Garza; 21 June 1986
Honduras	2–0 (2-2) (4–2)	2023–24 CONCACAF Nations League A	Estadio Azteca, Mexico City; 21 November 2023
South Korea	0–0 (2–4)	2002 CONCACAF Gold Cup	(United States) Rose Bowl, Pasadena; 27 January 2002
Nigeria	1–1 (5–4)	1995 King Fahd Cup	(Saudi Arabia) King Fahd II Stadium, Riyadh; 13 January 1995
Peru	3–3 (4–2)	1999 Copa América	(Paraguay) Estadio Defensores del Chaco, Asunción; 10 July 1999
United States	0–0 (1–4)	1995 Copa América	(Uruguay) Estadio Parque Artigas, Paysandú; 17 July 1995

== FIFA World Ranking ==
A line chart depicting the history of the Mexico's year-end placements in the FIFA World Rankings.

Last update was on 21 December 2023.

Best Ranking Worst Ranking Best Mover Worst Mover

Mexico's FIFA World Ranking History
Rank	Year	Best		Worst	
Rank	Year	Rank	Move	Rank	Move
15	2023	12	▲2	14	▼2
15	2022	9	▲3	15	▼3
14	2021	9	▲2	14	▼5
9	2020	9	▲2	11	Steady
11	2019	11	▲6	18	▼1
17	2018	10	▲5	17	▼1
16	2017	14	▲2	18	▼2
18	2016	14	▲6	23	▼2
22	2015	18	▲14	40	▼17
20	2014	16	▲2	21	▼3
21	2013	14	▲4	24	▼3
15	2012	14	▲5	22	▼3
21	2011	9	▲19	28	▼11
27	2010	15	▲2	28	▼7
17	2009	15	▲6	33	▼7
26	2008	14	▲8	32	▼13
15	2007	10	▲16	26	▼6
20	2006	4	▲2	20	▼14
5	2005	5	▲2	8	▼2
7	2004	4	▲2	10	▼2
7	2003	4	▲6	11	▼3
8	2002	6	▲1	9	▼1
9	2001	9	▲2	15	▼2
12	2000	8	▲2	14	▼5
10	1999	9	▲3	14	▼2
10	1998	4	▲2	12	▼8
5	1997	5	▲6	12	▼2
11	1996	8	▲4	15	▼2
12	1995	7	▲6	16	▼6
15	1994	13	▲4	19	▼3
16	1993	14	▲11	18	▼2
