= Jared Borgetti =

Mexican footballer (born 1973)

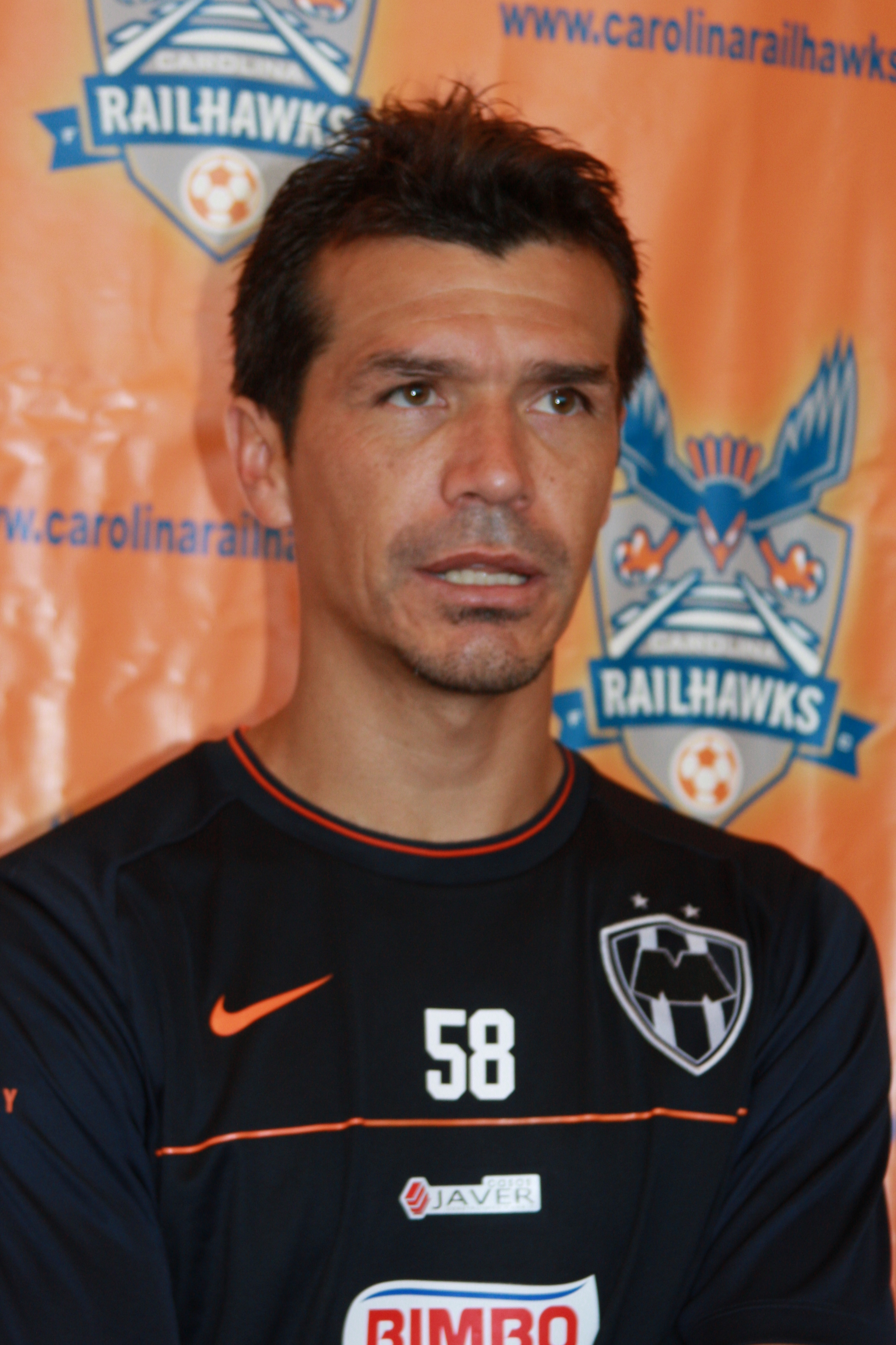
- Borgetti in 2008

Personal information
- Full name: Jared Francisco Borgetti Echavarría
- Date of birth: 14 August 1973 (age 53)
- Place of birth: Culiacán, Sinaloa, Mexico
- Height: 1.85 m (6 ft 1 in)
- Position: Forward

Youth career
- Águilas UAS
- Atlas

Senior career*
Years	Team	Apps	(Gls)
1993–1996	Atlas	61	(21)
1996–2004	Santos Laguna	295	(189)
2004	Sinaloa	14	(8)
2005	Pachuca	15	(8)
2005–2006	Bolton Wanderers	19	(2)
2006	Al-Ittihad	15	(10)
2007	Cruz Azul	26	(7)
2008	Monterrey	27	(10)
2009	Guadalajara	7	(0)
2009	Puebla	15	(5)
2010	Monarcas Morelia	15	(4)
2010	León	16	(7)
Total		525	(271)

International career
1997–2008	Mexico	89	(46)
Medal record
Men's football
Representing Mexico
Copa América
Runner-up	2001 Colombia
Third place	2007 Venezuela
CONCACAF Gold Cup
Winner	2003 Mexico-United States
Runner-up	2007 United States
Central American and Caribbean Games
Silver medal – second place	1993 Puerto Rico
CONCACAF Pre-Olympic Tournament
Winner	1996 Canada
- * Club domestic league appearances and goals

Jared Francisco Borgetti Echavarría (Spanish: [xaˈɾeð βoɾˈxeti]; born 14 August 1973) is a Mexican former professional footballer who works as a commentator for ESPN Deportes and ESPN Mexico.

Borgetti built a reputation as a highly prolific goal scorer, distinguished in particular by his exceptional ability in the air. He spent the majority of his career with Santos Laguna, where he remains the club’s all-time leading scorer. During a brief spell in Europe, he made history as the first Mexican footballer to appear in English football. He ranks as the third-highest scorer in the history of Mexico's top division and is widely regarded as one of the greatest North American footballers of all time.

On the international stage, Borgetti made over 80 appearances and scored 46 goals, making him the third all-time leading scorer for the national team. He represented Mexico at the FIFA World Cup in 2002 and 2006.

== Club career ==
=== Santos Laguna ===
Borgetti began his club career with Atlas in the Primera División de México on 6 March 1994, debuting in a 3–1 loss to América. After two successful seasons, he signed with Santos Laguna, where he claimed three golden boot titles for most goals in the season in his seven-year participation with club. With Santos, he won two league championships. Borgetti later signed a one-year contract with promoted team Dorados de Sinaloa, where he stated he wanted to play in his home team, before joining Pachuca, at the latter where he had little activity due to the qualifying games for the World Cup.

=== Bolton Wanderers ===
On 4 August 2005, Borgetti signed a two-year deal with English club Bolton Wanderers for a fee of around £1 million. He became the first Mexican to play for an English club.

He made his official English debut in a 2–0 Premier League win over Newcastle United twenty days after signing, and scored his first goal for the club during Bolton's UEFA Cup tie against Lokomotiv Plovdiv on September 15, scoring again in the competition against Besiktas on 20 October. He went on to score in the FA Cup against Watford and in the League Cup against West Ham and Leicester City. Having also scored two league goals against Manchester City and Charlton Athletic, Borgetti ended the season with seven goals in all competitions.

=== Al-Ittihad ===
After the 2005–06 season, Borgetti was released by Bolton. He eventually signed with Saudi Arabian club Al-Ittihad. He made his debut on 9 September 2006, scoring two goals in a 3–2 victory over Saudi team Al-Ta'ee. In December 2006, Borgetti left Al-Ittihad. Teams from the leagues of France, England, and Spain showed interest in signing the player.

=== Cruz Azul ===
In mid-December 2006, Santos Laguna showed interest in signing Borgetti and Francisco Fonseca, but days later, Club América signed Vicente Matias Vuoso on loan to Santos. Borgetti and Fonseca turned down the club's offer and later announced that he would return to Mexico as a member of Cruz Azul under a one-year contract. In 2007, Borgetti was called upon by Hugo Sánchez to represent Mexico in a series of international friendly matches and tournaments. His jersey number was 58.

=== Monterrey ===
On 21 December 2007, it was officially announced that Borgetti would play for Monterrey for the next six months in the Mexico Clausura 2008 tournament. Borgetti scored his first goal with the Rayados in the Clásico Regiomontano against Tigres UANL, where Tigres won 3–2.

=== Guadalajara ===
Starting on 14 January 2009, Borgetti played for Guadalajara for six months. He was brought especially to play in the 2009 Copa Libertadores. He always stated that he had accomplished one of his dreams as a footballer, to be on a team where all of the players were Mexican-born and to be on a team with the most championships in the Primera División. Borgetti played seven games in the Torneo Clausura 2009 as a starter and six as a sub, barely recording 220 minutes for the club. In the Copa Libertadores, he played six out of the six games, three as a starter and three as a sub, playing a total of 366 minutes. Shortly after the season ended Borgetti was let go along with other newly recruited teammates due to the club's disappointing season.

=== Puebla ===
Since his departure from Guadalajara, Borgetti has gone on to sign with Puebla as of 13 June 2009 in time for the Apertura 2009 Tournament. In a pre-season game, Borgetti suffered a broken ribcage and had to sit out for the first four weeks of the Apertura Tournament. He scored his first goal on 9 August 2009 against Querétaro. He continued his good form by scoring a header on 22 August 2009, in a 2–1 win against Pachuca. At the end of the season Borgetti left the club to pursue another team. He decided to go back to Mexico with his family and friends.

=== Morelia ===
On 27 December 2009, Borgetti signed a one-year contract with Monarcas Morelia. On 13 February 2010, he scored his first goal with Monarcas Morelia and 249th in Mexico league football. That same goal tied him for third top goal scorer in Mexico league history with José Saturnino Cardozo. On 24 April 2010, he scored his 250th goal, giving him the sole possession of the third position in the top goal scorers of the Mexico League, passing Jose Cardozo who played for Toluca and scored 249 goals.

=== León ===
After his departure from Morelia, Borgetti was considering retirement, but after getting an agreement with Club León, he played for the team in Mexico's Liga de Ascenso in the fall of 2010. After failing to make it to the play-offs he was released from his contract. On 5 December 2010, he announced his retirement from professional football.

== International career ==
On the international stage, Borgetti made his debut with Mexico on 5 February 1997, in a match against Ecuador. His greater impact came during the qualification campaign for the 2002 FIFA World Cup, beginning in late 2000. Following Mexico’s successful qualification, Borgetti became a regular starter.

In the 2002 FIFA World Cup, Borgetti scored a header against Italy in a group stage match that ended 1–1. FIFA later highlighted the technical difficulty of the goal, noting how Borgetti redirected the ball past Gianluigi Buffon while closely marked by Paolo Maldini.

Borgetti’s most notable tournament performance came at the 2005 FIFA Confederations Cup, where he scored three goals against Brazil and Germany, contributing to Mexico’s fourth-place finish. In the match against Brazil, he was required to retake a penalty twice due to infractions; the third attempt was blocked, but he later scored the decisive goal in a 1–0 victory.

On 17 August 2005, Borgetti scored his 36th international goal in a World Cup qualifier against Costa Rica, surpassing Luis Hernández as Mexico’s all-time leading scorer. He continued to add to his tally in subsequent competitions, including the 2007 CONCACAF Gold Cup, where he scored multiple goals before an injury prevented him from participating in the 2007 Copa América.

Borgetti’s final international appearance came on 22 June 2008, in a 2010 FIFA World Cup qualifier against Belize, where he scored twice. He retired from the national team as its all-time leading scorer, a record he held until Javier Hernández surpassed it nearly a decade later.

== Personal life ==
Borgetti is of Italian descent through his grandfather, who migrated from Cuneo, Piedmont, to Sinaloa. Because of this, he was able to get an Italian passport, though he has stated that this was solely for the purpose of playing football in England. This allowed Borgetti to be registered as an EU-member player.

== Career statistics ==
=== Club ===
Appearances and goals by club, season and competition
Club	Season	League			Cup (Note: Includes Crown Prince Cup.)		Continental		Total	
Club	Season	Division	Apps	Goals	Apps	Goals	Apps	Goals	Apps	Goals
Atlas	1993–94	Mexican Primera División	2	0					2	0
Atlas	1994–95	Mexican Primera División	28	13					28	13
Atlas	1995–96	Mexican Primera División	31	8	3	1			34	9
Atlas	Total		61	21	3	1			64	22
Santos Laguna	1996–97	Mexican Primera División	41	21	5	2			46	23
Santos Laguna	1997–98	Mexican Primera División	29	14			1	0	30	14
Santos Laguna	1998–99	Mexican Primera División	38	19	3	2			41	21
Santos Laguna	1999–00	Mexican Primera División	39	22					39	22
Santos Laguna	2000–01	Mexican Primera División	43	41					43	41
Santos Laguna	2001–02	Mexican Primera División	31	23			4	4	35	27
Santos Laguna	2002–03	Mexican Primera División	39	27					39	27
Santos Laguna	2003–04	Mexican Primera División	35	22	4	4	7	4	46	30
Santos Laguna	Total		295	189	12	8	12	8	319	205
Dorados	2004–05	Mexican Primera División	14	8					14	8
Pachuca	2004–05	Mexican Primera División	15	8			5	2	20	10
Bolton Wanderers	2005–06	Premier League	19	2	6	3	7	2	32	7
Al-Ittihad	2006–07	Saudi League	15	10			2	1	17	11
Cruz Azul	2006–07	Mexican Primera División	17	5					17	5
Cruz Azul	2007–08	Mexican Primera División	9	2					9	2
Cruz Azul	Total		26	7				!26	7	
Monterrey	2007–08	Mexican Primera División	16	8	2	0			18	8
Monterrey	2008–09	Mexican Primera División	11	2					11	2
Monterrey	Total		27	10	2	0		0	29	10
Guadalajara	2008–09	Mexican Primera División	7	0			6	0	13	0
Puebla	2009–10	Mexican Primera División	15	5					15	5
Morelia	2009–10	Mexican Primera División	15	4			6	3	21	7
León	2010–11	Liga de Ascenso	16	7					16	7
Career total			525	271	24	12	38	16	587	299

=== International ===
Appearances and goals by national team and year
National team	Year	Apps	Goals
Mexico	1997	1	1
Mexico	2000	6	4
Mexico	2001	21	6
Mexico	2002	9	4
Mexico	2003	11	3
Mexico	2004	12	10
Mexico	2005	17	9
Mexico	2006	5	2
Mexico	2007	9	5
Mexico	2008	3	3
Total		89	47

== Honours ==
Santos Laguna

- Liga MX: Invierno 1996, Verano 2001
- InterLiga: 2004

Pachuca

- Copa Pachuca runner-up: 2005

Bolton Wanderers

- Premier League Asia Trophy: 2005

Al-Ittihad

- Saudi Pro League: 2006–07

Guadalajara

- InterLiga: 2009

Mexico

- FIFA Confederations Cup fourth place: 2005
- Copa América runner-up: 2001; third place: 2007
- CONCACAF Gold Cup: 2003
- Central American and Caribbean Games Silver Medal: 1993
- CONCACAF Pre-Olympic Tournament: 1996

Individual

- Liga MX Golden Ball: Invierno 2000, Verano 2001
- Liga MX Golden Boot: Invierno 2000, Verano 2001
- Liga MX Best Forward: Invierno 2000, Verano 2001
- IFFHS Best First Division Scorer: 2001 (2nd place)
- IFFHS Most Effective Top Division Goal Scorer: 2001 (3rd place)
- IFFHS' World's 5th Best Top Goal Scorer of the Year: 2004
- FIFA Confederations Cup Third Top Scorer: 2005
- FIFA Confederations Cup Fair Play Trophy: 2005
- IFFHS' World's 7th Best Top Goal Scorer of the Year: 2005
- FIFA World Cup Qualification Top Scorer: 2006
- Liga MX Career Achievement Award: 2010
- IFFHS 14th Best Top International Goal Scorer of the Decade: 2001–2010
- FIFA International Football Hall of Fame: 2016
- Lagunero Distinguido: 2018
- Salón de la Fama de Culiacán: 2021

Records

- Santos Laguna All Time Scorer: 205 goals
