= Ettson Ayón =

Mexican footballer (born 2001)

Personal information
- Full name: Ettson Ayón Calderón
- Date of birth: 26 March 2001 (age 25)
- Place of birth: Tijuana, Baja California, Mexico
- Height: 1.83 m (6 ft 0 in)
- Position: Forward

Team information
- Current team: Juárez (on loan from León)
- Number: 29

Youth career
- 2016–2021: Tijuana

Senior career*
Years	Team	Apps	(Gls)
2021–2022	Tijuana	1	(0)
2022–2024	Querétaro	45	(8)
2024–	León	24	(1)
2026–	→ Juárez (loan)	13	(2)

International career^{‡}
2019	Mexico U18	1	(0)
2023–2024	Mexico U23	16	(5)
2024–	Mexico	1	(0)
Medal record
Men's football
Representing Mexico
Pan American Games
Bronze medal – third place	2023 Santiago	Team
Central American and Caribbean Games
Gold medal – first place	2023 San Salvador	Team
- * Club domestic league appearances and goals as of 26 August 2026 ‡ National team caps and goals as of 31 May 2024

Ettson Ayón Calderón (born 26 March 2001) is a Mexican professional footballer who plays as a forward for Liga MX club Juárez, on loan from León.

== International career ==
Ayón made his debut for the Mexico national team on 31 May 2024, in a friendly against Bolivia.

== Career statistics ==
=== Club ===
As of 26 August 2026

Club	Season	League			Cup		Continental		Other		Total	
Club	Season	Division	Apps	Goals	Apps	Goals	Apps	Goals	Apps	Goals	Apps	Goals
Tijuana	2021–22	Liga MX	1	0	—		—		—		1	0
Querétaro	2022–23	Liga MX	19	4	—		—		—		19	4
Querétaro	2023–24	Liga MX	25	4	—		—		1 (Note: Appearance in Leagues Cup)	0	26	4
Querétaro	Total		44	8	—		—		1	0	45	8
León	2024–25	Liga MX	16	1	—		—		—		16	1
León	2025–26	Liga MX	8	0	—		—		3	0	11	0
León	Total		24	1	—		—		3	0	27	1
Juárez (loan)	2025–26	Liga MX	12	2	—		—		—		12	2
Juárez (loan)	2026–27	Liga MX	1	0	—		—		2	1	3	1
Juárez (loan)	Total		13	2	—		—		2	1	15	3
Career total			52	10	0	0	0	0	3	1	55	11

=== International ===
As of match played on 31 May 2024

Appearances and goals by national team and year
National team	Year	Apps	Goals
Mexico	2024	1	0
Total		1	0

== Honours ==
Mexico U23

- Central American and Caribbean Games: 2023
- Pan American Bronze Medal: 2023

Individual

- Central American and Caribbean Games Top Scorer (Shared): 2023
