= Football at the 1962 Central American and Caribbean Games =

Tournament details
- Host country: Jamaica
- Dates: 13–24 August
- Teams: 6 (from 2 confederations)
- Venue: 1 (in 1 host city)

Final positions
- Champions: Netherlands Antilles (1st title)
- Runners-up: Mexico
- Third place: Venezuela
- Fourth place: Jamaica

Tournament statistics
- Matches played: 15
- Goals scored: 63 (4.2 per match)
- Top scorer(s): (Netherlands Antilles) Ruben Brandborg (Mexico) Javier Fragoso (6 goals)

Football was contested for men only at the 1962 Central American and Caribbean Games in Kingston, Jamaica.

The gold medal was won by Netherlands Antilles for the third time, who earned 10 points and finished the tournament unbeaten.

Event	Gold	Silver	Bronze
Men's football	Netherlands Antilles (AHO)	Mexico (MEX)	Venezuela (VEN)

== Participating teams ==
Team	Appearance	Previous best performance
Cuba	4th	Gold medal (1930)
Jamaica	2nd	Group stage (1930)
Mexico	6th	Gold medal (1935, 1938, 1959)
Netherlands Antilles	4th	Gold medal (1950)
Puerto Rico	3rd	5th (1959)
Venezuela	4th	Bronze medal (1959)

== Table ==
A 2-point system used.

Pos	Team	Pld	W	D	L	GF	GA	GD	Pts
1	Netherlands Antilles (C)	5	5	0	0	16	5	+11	10
2	Mexico	5	4	0	1	17	4	+13	8
3	Venezuela	5	3	0	2	12	6	+6	6
4	Jamaica	5	2	0	3	13	8	+5	4
5	Cuba	5	1	0	4	4	16	−12	2
6	Puerto Rico	5	0	0	5	1	24	−23	0

(C) Champions

== Results ==
13 August 1962

Cuba	1–2	Netherlands Antilles
Álvarez 50'	Report	Wernet 35'; Werleman 75'

The National Stadium, Kingston
13 August 1962

Jamaica	6–1	Puerto Rico
Largie 15'; Chavannes 27', 34'; Lewin 49'; East 56'; Bartlett 56'	Report	Mercado 2 half'

The National Stadium, Kingston
13 August 1962

Mexico	2–1	Venezuela
Patiño 10'; Fragoso 90+1'	Report	Á. García 83'

The National Stadium, Kingston
15 August 1962

Jamaica	1–3	Netherlands Antilles
Schloss 40'	Report	Piggott 75'; Brandborg 76'; Schoop 85'

The National Stadium, Kingston
15 August 1962

Mexico	8–0	Puerto Rico
Fragoso 10', 62'; J. González 23'; Estrada 50', 64', 82' (pen.); Yáñez 57'; Díez 87'	Report

The National Stadium, Kingston
15 August 1962

Cuba	0–2	Venezuela
	Report	Á. Garcia 45', 64'

The National Stadium, Kingston
17 August 1962

Jamaica	0–2	Venezuela
	Report	Lopez 14', 75'

The National Stadium, Kingston
17 August 1962

Puerto Rico	0–4	Netherlands Antilles
	Report	Brandborg 25', 30', 80'; Felix 35'

The National Stadium, Kingston
17 August 1962

Cuba	0–6	Mexico
	Report	Fragoso ?', ?', ?'; Romo ?'; Díez ?'; Padilla ?'

The National Stadium, Kingston
20 August 1962

Venezuela	3–4	Netherlands Antilles
Ravelo 57'; Font 63', 71' (pen.)	Report	Wernet 15'; Schoop 21', 56'; Brandborg 36'

The National Stadium, Kingston
20 August 1962

Jamaica	0–1	Mexico
	Report	Padilla 60'

The National Stadium, Kingston
22 August 1962

Cuba	2–0	Puerto Rico
Ricabal 15'; Álvarez 22'	Report

The National Stadium, Kingston
22 August 1962

Mexico	0–3	Netherlands Antilles
	Report	Schoop 42'; Wernet 50'; Brandborg 76'

The National Stadium, Kingston
24 August 1962

Jamaica	6–1	Cuba
Chavannes 8', 13', ?'; Bartlett 52', 53'; East ?' (pen.)	Report	Piedra 47'

The National Stadium, Kingston
24 August 1962

Venezuela	4–0	Puerto Rico
Ravelo ?', ?'; Á. Garcia ?'; Tovar ?'	Report

The National Stadium, Kingston

1962 Central American and Caribbean Games

Netherlands Antilles
1st title

== Statistics ==
=== Goalscorers ===
There were 63 goals scored in 15 matches, for an average of 4.2 goals per match.

6 goals

- (Netherlands Antilles) Ruben Brandborg
- (Mexico) Javier Fragoso

5 goals

- (Jamaica) Peter Chavannes

4 goals

- (Netherlands Antilles) Stanley Schoop
- (Venezuela) Ángel García

3 goals

- (Netherlands Antilles) Ocando Wernet
- (Jamaica) Sydney Bartlett
- (Mexico) José Luis Estrada
- (Venezuela) Antonio Ravelo

2 goals

- (Cuba) Ramón Álvarez
- (Jamaica) Kenneth East
- (Mexico) Aarón Padilla
- (Mexico) Jorge Díez
- (Venezuela) Gustavo Lopez
- (Venezuela) Nicolás Font

1 goal

- (Netherlands Antilles) Damasio Werleman
- (Netherlands Antilles) Rene Piggott
- (Netherlands Antilles) Felix Angelico Perez
- (Cuba) Enrique Ricabal
- (Cuba) Ángel Piedra
- (Jamaica) Henry Largie
- (Jamaica) Elvin Schloss
- (Jamaica) Peter Lewin
- (Mexico) Ezequiel Yáñez
- (Mexico) Juan González
- (Mexico) Marco Antonio Patiño
- (Mexico) Alfredo Romo
- (Puerto Rico) Máximo Mercado
- (Venezuela) Alí Tovar

=== Team of the Tournament ===
Ideal XI by RSSSF
Goalkeeper	Defenders	Midfielders	Forwards
(Mexico) Federico Ochoa	(Netherlands Antilles) Morty Meulens (Netherlands Antilles) Egon Schoop (Venezuela) Jesús Coronado	(Mexico) José Luis Estrada (Netherlands Antilles) Stanley De Lannoy	(Venezuela) Alí Tovar (Jamaica) Peter Chavannes (Netherlands Antilles) Ruben Brandborg (Mexico) Javier Fragoso (Venezuela) Ángel García
