= Football at the 1970 Central American and Caribbean Games =

1970 Central American and Caribbean Games
Tournament details
- Host country: Panama
- City: Panama City
- Dates: 1–13 March
- Teams: 6 (from 1 confederation)
- Venue: 1 (in 1 host city)

Final positions
- Champions: Cuba (2nd title)
- Runners-up: Netherlands Antilles
- Third place: Colombia
- Fourth place: Venezuela

Tournament statistics
- Matches played: 22
- Goals scored: 86 (3.91 per match)
- Top scorer(s): (Cuba) José Verdecia (9 goals)

Football was contested for men only at the 1970 Central American and Caribbean Games in Panama City, Panama. All matches took place at the newly constructed Estadio Rommel Fernández.

The gold medal was won by Cuba for the third time, who earned 6 points in the final stage.

Event	Gold	Silver	Bronze
Men's football	Cuba (CUB)	Netherlands Antilles (AHO)	Colombia (COL)

== Participants ==
- Bahamas
- Colombia
- Cuba
- Dominican Republic
- Netherlands Antilles
- Nicaragua
- Panama (Hosts)
- Puerto Rico
- Venezuela

== Results ==
=== Group 1 ===
A 2-point system used.

Pos	Team	Pld	W	D	L	GF	GA	GD	Pts	Qualification or relegation
1	Colombia	3	3	0	0	12	3	+9	6	Final stage
2	Cuba	3	2	0	1	9	5	+4	4	Final stage
3	Panama	3	1	0	2	7	10	−3	2	Eliminated
4	Nicaragua	3	0	0	3	5	15	−10	0	Eliminated

2 March 1970

Panama	4–3	Nicaragua
G. Romero 13'; I. Torres 32'; Bounting 75', 78'	Report	F. Romero 31'; Cuadra 65', 77'

Estadio Rommel Fernández, Panama City
2 March 1970

Cuba	1–2	Colombia
Hernández 2'	Report	Samboni 14'; Velasquez 44'

Estadio Rommel Fernández, Panama City
4 March 1970

Panama	3–4	Cuba
Espinoza 43', 90'; Nimbley 80'	Report	Hernández 26'; Verdecia 38', 82', 87'

Estadio Rommel Fernández, Panama City
5 March 1970

Colombia	7–2	Nicaragua
Velásquez 2'; Arboleda 7'; A. Torres 20', 57'; Garces 2half', 2half' Buitrago ?' (o.g.)	Report	F. Romero 39'; O. Torres 2half'

Estadio Rommel Fernández, Panama City
6 March 1970

Panama	0–3	Colombia
	Report	A. Torres 42'; Velásquez 75'; Campaz 77'

Estadio Rommel Fernández, Panama City
7 March 1970

Cuba	4–0	Nicaragua
	Report	Verdecia 10', 44', 87'; Fariñas ?' (pen.)

Estadio Rommel Fernández, Panama City

=== Group 2 ===
A 2-point system used.

Pos	Team	Pld	W	D	L	GF	GA	GD	Pts	Qualification or relegation
1	Netherlands Antilles	4	4	0	0	17	2	+15	8	Final stage
2	Venezuela	4	3	0	1	12	6	+6	6	Final stage
3	Dominican Republic	4	1	1	2	8	8	0	3	Eliminated
4	Puerto Rico	4	1	0	3	3	9	−6	2	Eliminated
5	Bahamas	4	0	1	3	3	18	−15	1	Eliminated

1 March 1970

Netherlands Antilles	1–0	Dominican Republic
Martijn 59' (pen.)	Report

Estadio Rommel Fernández, Panama City
1 March 1970

Puerto Rico	3–0	Bahamas
	Report

Estadio Rommel Fernández, Panama City
2 March 1970

Bahamas	2–2	Dominican Republic
Love 85'; Nicholls 88'	Report	Rojas 28'; López 49'

Estadio Rommel Fernández, Panama City
2 March 1970

Venezuela	1–0	Puerto Rico
Gómez ?'	Report

Estadio Rommel Fernández, Panama City
3 March 1970

Netherlands Antilles	3–0	Puerto Rico
Bislip 5'; Victoria 74', 89'	Report

Estadio Rommel Fernández, Panama City
4 March 1970

Netherlands Antilles	8–1	Bahamas
Martina 8', 75'; Loefstok 38'; Martis 42', 43'; Richardson 63'; Flores 66'; Martijn 89'	Report	Haven 50'

Estadio Rommel Fernández, Panama City
4 March 1970

Venezuela	5–1	Dominican Republic
García 31', 74'; Gómez 57'; Marcano 66', 86'	Report	Rojas 70' (pen.)

Estadio Rommel Fernández, Panama City
5 March 1970

Venezuela	5–0	Bahamas
García 18', 40'; Marcano 34'; Gómez 68'; Pérez 80'	Report

Estadio Rommel Fernández, Panama City
6 March 1970

Puerto Rico	0–5	Dominican Republic
	Report

Estadio Rommel Fernández, Panama City
7 March 1970

Netherlands Antilles	5–1	Venezuela
Victoria ?', ?'; Melfor ?', ?'; Loefstok ?'	Report	Marcano ?'

Estadio Rommel Fernández, Panama City

=== Final stage ===
A 2-point system used.

Pos	Team	Pld	W	D	L	GF	GA	GD	Pts
1	Cuba (C)	3	3	0	0	9	2	+7	6
2	Netherlands Antilles	3	1	0	2	3	4	−1	2
3	Colombia	3	1	0	2	2	4	−2	2
4	Venezuela	3	1	0	2	2	8	−6	2

(C) Champions
9 March 1970

Colombia	0–2 Awarded	Venezuela
	Report

Estadio Rommel Fernández, Panama City

Colombia won 3–0, but the result was later awarded to Venezuela 2-0

9 March 1970

Cuba	2–0	Netherlands Antilles
Verdecia 3'; Fariñas 68'	Report

Estadio Rommel Fernández, Panama City
11 March 1970

Venezuela	0–3	Netherlands Antilles
	Report	Victoria 16', 42'; Flores 73'

Estadio Rommel Fernández, Panama City
11 March 1970

Cuba	2–0 Awarded	Colombia
	Report

Estadio Rommel Fernández, Panama City

Colombia won 1–0, but the result was later awarded to Cuba 2-0 when Cuba protested against Colombian players Pedro Zape and Armando Torres for being professionals; in fact, it was discovered that Zape indeed was, and therefore, on 12 March the "Tribunal de Honor de los XI Juegos Centroamericanos y del Caribe" decided to award the match to Cuba 2–0.

13 March 1970

Cuba	5–0	Venezuela
Masso 17', 20'; Verdecia 57', 80'; Fariñas 72'	Report

Estadio Rommel Fernández, Panama City
13 March 1970

Netherlands Antilles	0–2 Awarded to Colombia 2-0	Colombia
	Report

Estadio Rommel Fernández, Panama City

Apparently, due to a misunderstanding (hour change), the Antilleans did not show up to play in the morning, but instead in the afternoon of March 13. Colombia was present in the morning, but not in the afternoon as the game was originally scheduled. Curiously, the same referee who gave the victory to Colombia in the morning also gave a win to the Netherlands Antilles in the afternoon. Finally the "Tribunal de Honor" made a Solomonic decision, Colombia was awarded a 2–0 result in its match against the Netherlands Antilles and with these results, Cuba obtained the gold medal, the Netherlands Antilles the Silver medal on goal difference and Colombia the bronze medal. There are versions that affirm that Colombia was expelled from the tournament after the Cuban protest, but they fall into contradictions because in the medal table Colombia was awarded the bronze medal. Everything indicates that Colombia was not expelled, they only lost the games in which they used professional players against Cuba and Venezuela respectively with the score of 2–0, but won the game against the Netherlands Antilles by forfeit with the score of 2–0.

1970 Central American and Caribbean Games

Cuba
2nd title

== Statistics ==
=== Goalscorers ===
There were 86 goals scored in 22 matches, for an average of 3.91 goals per match.

9 goals

- (Cuba) José Verdecia

6 goals

- (Netherlands Antilles) Franklin Victoria

4 goals

- (Venezuela) Antonio Marcano
- (Venezuela) Iván García

3 goals

- (Colombia) Armando Torres
- (Colombia) Elkin Velasquez
- (Cuba) Francisco Fariñas
- (Venezuela) Carlos Eduardo Gómez

2 goals

- (Netherlands Antilles) Elio Flores
- (Netherlands Antilles) Erwin Melfor
- (Netherlands Antilles) Hubert Martina
- (Netherlands Antilles) Melvyn Loefstok
- (Netherlands Antilles) Ronald Martis
- (Netherlands Antilles) Wilbert Martijn
- (Colombia) José Roberto Garces
- (Cuba) Jorge Masso
- (Cuba) Luis Hernández
- (Dominican Republic) Elvis Rojas
- (Nicaragua) Francisco Romero
- (Nicaragua) Manuel Cuadra
- (Panama) Guillermo Bounting
- (Panama) Rodrigo Espinoza

1 goal

- (Netherlands Antilles) James Richardson
- (Netherlands Antilles) Mario Bislip
- (The Bahamas) Kenneth Love
- (The Bahamas) Stephen Nicholls
- (The Bahamas) Samuel Haven
- (Colombia) Carlos Samboni
- (Colombia) Jairo Arboleda
- (Colombia) Víctor Campaz
- (Dominican Republic) Epifanio López
- (Nicaragua) Oscar Torres
- (Panama) Gaspar Romero
- (Panama) Ignacio Torres
- (Panama) Eduardo Nimbley
- (Venezuela) Ricardo Pérez

1 own goal

- (Nicaragua) Sergio Buitrago (against Cuba)
