= Aarón Padilla (footballer, born 1942) =

Mexican footballer (1942–2020)

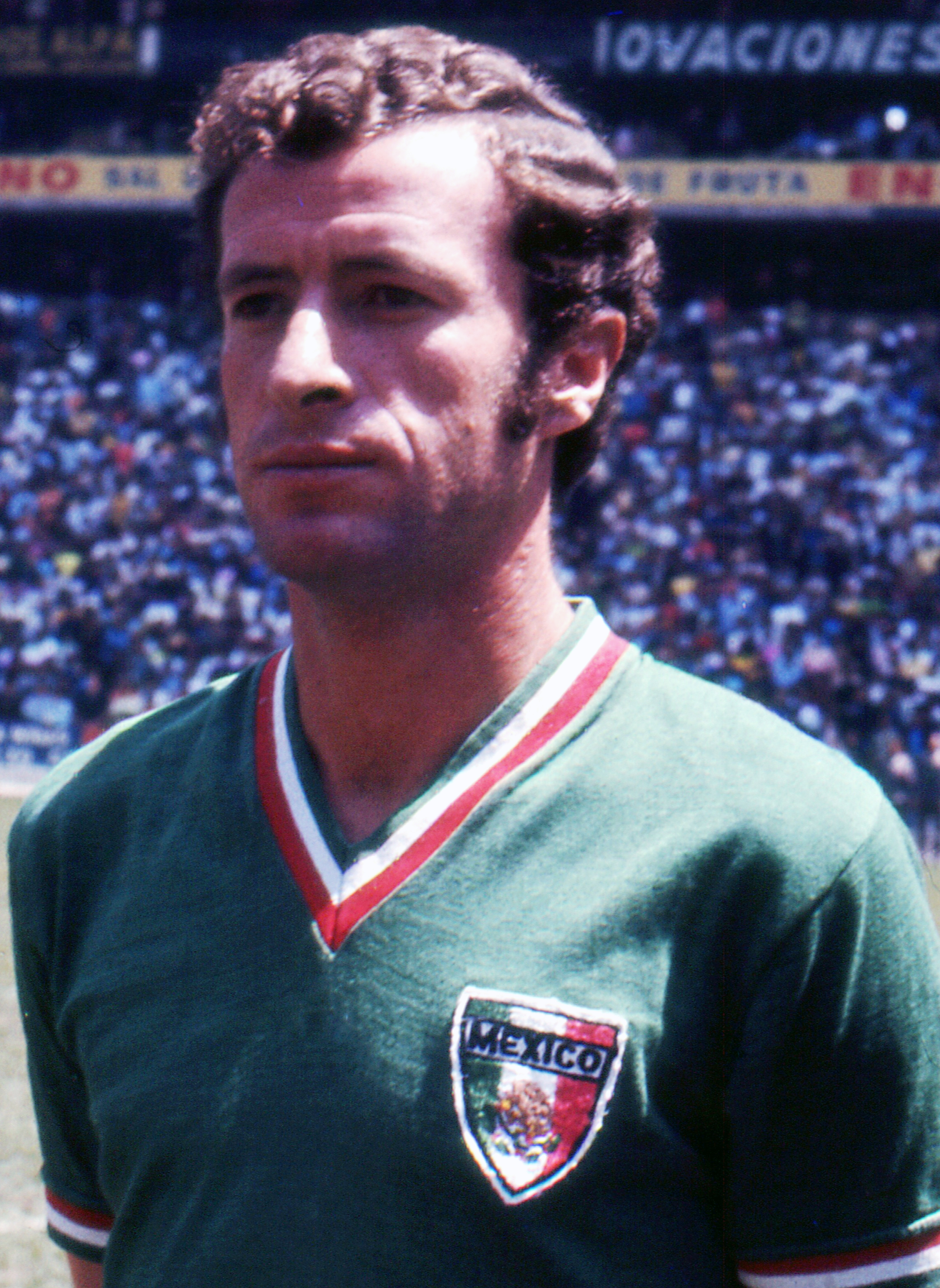

Personal information
- Full name: Aarón Padilla Gutiérrez
- Date of birth: 10 July 1942
- Place of birth: Mexico City, Mexico
- Date of death: 14 June 2020 (aged 77)
- Place of death: Guadalajara, Jalisco, Mexico
- Height: 1.76 m (5 ft 9 in)
- Position: Forward

Senior career*
Years	Team	Apps	(Gls)
1962–1972	Pumas		
1972–1973	Atlante		
1973–1974	Veracruz		
1974–1975	Pumas		

International career
1965–1970	Mexico	55	(8)
Medal record
Men's football
Representing Mexico
Central American and Caribbean Games
Silver medal – second place	Kingston 1962
- * Club domestic league appearances and goals

Aarón Padilla Gutiérrez (10 July 1942 – 14 June 2020) was a Mexican football striker, who played for the Mexico national team between 1965 and 1970, gaining 55 caps and scoring 8 goals.

== Biography ==
He was part of the Mexico squad for the 1966 and 1970 World Cups.

At club level, Padilla played for Pumas, Atlante, and Veracruz.

On 14 June 2020, Padilla died from COVID-19 during the COVID-19 pandemic in Mexico.

He is the father of fellow football striker Aarón Padilla.
