= Antonio Ravelo =

Venezuelan footballer (1940-2014)

Personal information
- Full name: Antonio Ravelo Rodríguez
- Date of birth: 2 April 1940
- Place of birth: Garachico, Spain
- Date of death: 15 February 2014 (aged 73)
- Position: Forward

International career
Years	Team	Apps	(Gls)
1967–1969	Venezuela	7	(2)
Medal record
Men's football
Representing Venezuela
Central American and Caribbean Games
Bronze medal – third place	Kingston 1962

Antonio Ravelo (2 April 1940 – 15 February 2014) was a Venezuelan footballer. He played in seven matches for the Venezuela national football team from 1967 to 1969. He was also part of Venezuela's squad for the 1967 South American Championship.
