= Emmanuel François =

French-Haitian football player (born 2000)

Personal information
- Date of birth: 25 January 2000 (age 26)
- Place of birth: Orange, France
- Height: 1.81 m (5 ft 11 in)
- Position: Winger

Youth career
- Sochaux

Senior career*
Years	Team	Apps	(Gls)
2017–2020	Sochaux B	28	(4)
2020–2021	Rodez B	4	(1)
2021–2022	Lusitanos Saint-Maur	11	(0)
2022	Paris 13 Atletico	0	(0)
2022–2023	Lusitanos Saint-Maur	23	(2)
2023–2024	US Ivry	24	(5)
2024–2025	Siarka Tarnobrzeg	30	(13)
2025–2026	Puszcza Niepołomice	12	(0)

International career
2021	Haiti U23	2	(0)
2021	Haiti	2	(1)
- * Club domestic league appearances and goals as of 16:39, 5 February 2026 (UTC)

Emmanuel François (born 25 January 2000) is a professional footballer who plays as a winger. Born in France, he plays for the Haiti national team.

== Club career ==
A youth product of Sochaux, François began his career with their reserves before joining Rodez's reserves in 2020. He transferred to Lusitanos Saint-Maur in the Championnat National 2 in the summer of 2021. On 25 June 2022, François signed for Championnat National side Paris 13 Atletico, but rejoined Lusitanos Saint-Maur shortly after.

On 31 July 2024, François moved from US Ivry to Polish fourth-tier club Siarka Tarnobrzeg. During his only season at Siarka, he scored 13 goals and provided 11 assists in 30 league appearances.

On 7 July 2025, François signed with Polish I liga club Puszcza Niepołomice. On 12 January the following year, his contract was terminated by mutual consent.

== International career ==
Born in France, François is of Haitian descent. He represented the Haiti U23s at the 2020 CONCACAF Men's Olympic Qualifying Championship. He made his debut with the Haiti in a friendly 6–1 loss to Bahrain on 2 September 2021, scoring his side's only goal.

== Career statistics ==
=== International ===
Appearances and goals by national team and year
National team	Year	Apps	Goals
Haiti
Haiti	2021	2	1
Total		2	1

Scores and results list Haiti's goal tally first, score column indicates score after each François goal.

List of international goals scored by Emmanuel François
No.	Date	Venue	Opponent	Score	Result	Competition
1	1 September 2021	Bahrain National Stadium, Riffa	Bahrain	1–5	1–6	Friendly

== Honours ==
Siarka Tarnobrzeg

- Polish Cup (Subcarpathia regionals): 2024–25
- Polish Cup (Stalowa Wola regionals): 2024–25
