= Ronaldo Webster =

Jamaican footballer (born 2001

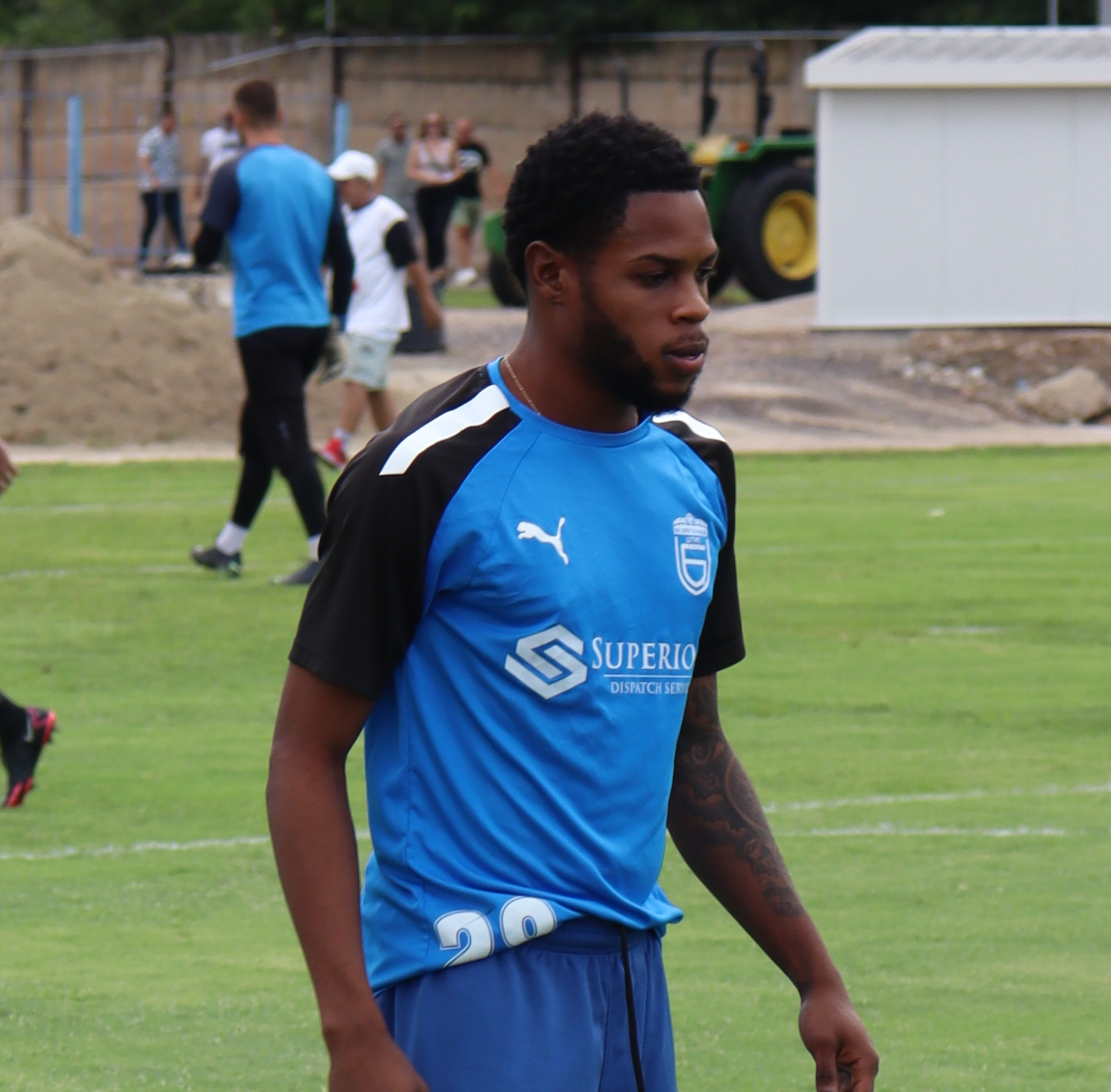
- Webster in 2023

Personal information
- Full name: Ronaldo Romario Webster
- Date of birth: 4 July 2001 (age 25)
- Place of birth: Savanna-la-Mar, Jamaica
- Height: 1.75 m (5 ft 9 in)
- Positions: Left-back; left winger

Team information
- Current team: Universitatea Craiova
- Number: 31

Youth career
- –2017: Reno

Senior career*
Years	Team	Apps	(Gls)
2018	Reno	7	(0)
2019–2024	Cavalier	85	(12)
2023–2024	→ Bregalnica Štip (loan)	18	(4)
2024	Bregalnica Štip	0	(0)
2024	→ Shkëndija (loan)	9	(0)
2024–2026	Shkëndija	41	(0)
2026–	Universitatea Craiova	2	(0)

International career^{‡}
2023	Jamaica Olympic	3	(1)
2022–	Jamaica	10	(0)
- * Club domestic league appearances and goals as of 18 October 2026 ‡ National team caps and goals as of 5 October 2026

Ronaldo Romario Webster (born 4 July 2001) is a Jamaican professional footballer who plays as a Left-back or a left winger for Liga I club Universitatea Craiova and the Jamaica national team.

== Early life ==
Webster was born on 4 July 2001 in Savanna-la-Mar, Jamaica and is a native of Westmoreland Parish, Jamaica. He was raised in the community of Strathbogie by his mother, Khadine Mullings, who has been a key motivator in his life. He has a sister and three brothers, two of whom died at a young age. Growing up, he attended Unity Primary School in Jamaica. Afterwards, he attended Petersfield High School, St. Elizabeth Technical High School, and Wolmer's Trust High School for Boys in Jamaica.

== Club career ==
Webster started his career with Jamaican side Reno, where he made seven league appearances and scored zero goals. In 2019, he signed for Jamaican side Cavalier, where he made eighty-five league appearances and scored twelve goals, and played in the Caribbean Club Championship, helping the club win the league title. Four years later, he signed for Macedonian side Bregalnica, where he made eighteen league appearances and scored four goals. Ahead of the 2024–25 season, he signed for Macedonian side Shkëndija, helping the club win the league title.

In June 2026, he was announced as a Romanian club Universitatea Craiova player for a €400,000 fee.

== International career ==
On 26 August 2022, Webster debuted for the Jamaica national football team during a 1–1 away friendly draw with the Qatar national football team. During the summer of 2023, he played for the Jamaica national under-23 football team at the 2023 Central American and Caribbean Games. On 5 September 2025, Webster earned his second Jamaica cap versus Bermuda in a World Cup qualifier.

== Career statistics ==
=== Club ===
As of match played 29 October 2026

Appearances and goals by club, season and competition
Club	Season	League			National cup (Note: Includes JFF Champions Cup, Macedonian Cup, Cupa României)		Continental		Other		Total	
Club	Season	Division	Apps	Goals	Apps	Goals	Apps	Goals	Apps	Goals	Apps	Goals
Reno	2017–18	National Premier League	7	0	—		—		—		7	0
Cavalier	2018–19	National Premier League	9	0	—		—		—		9	0
Cavalier	2019–20	National Premier League	13	2	—		—		—		13	2
Cavalier	2021	Jamaica Premier League	10	2	—		—		—		10	2
Cavalier	2022	Jamaica Premier League	25	3	—		—		2 (Note: Appearances in CONCACAF Caribbean Cup)	2	27	5
Cavalier	2022–23	Jamaica Premier League	28	5	?	?	—		—		28	5
Cavalier	Total		85	12	?	?	—		2	2	87	14
Bregalnica Štip (loan)	2023–24	1. MFL	18	4	1	0	—		—		19	4
Shkëndija (loan)	2023–24	1. MFL	9	0	—		—		—		9	0
Shkëndija	2024–25	1. MFL	19	0	4	0	2 (Note: Appearances in UEFA Conference League)	0	—		25	0
Shkëndija	2025–26	1. MFL	22	0	3	0	16 (Note: Six appearances in UEFA Champions League, two appearances in UEFA Europa League, eight appearances in UEFA Conference League)	0	—		41	0
Shkëndija	Total		50	0	7	0	18	0	—		75	0
Universitatea Craiova	2026–27	Liga I	2	0	2	0	0	0	0	0	4	0
Career total			162	16	10	0	18	0	2	2	192	18

=== International ===
As of match played 5 October 2026

Appearances and goals by national team and year
National team	Year	Apps	Goals
Jamaica	2022	1	0
Jamaica	2025	1	0
Jamaica	2026	8	0
Total		10	0

== Honours ==
Cavalier

- Jamaica Premier League: 2021
- JFF Champions Cup runner-up: 2022–23

Shkëndija

- 1. MFL: 2024–25
- Macedonian Cup runner-up: 2025–26

Universitatea Craiova

- Supercupa României: 2026
