= Javier Fragoso =

Mexican footballer and manager (1942-2014)

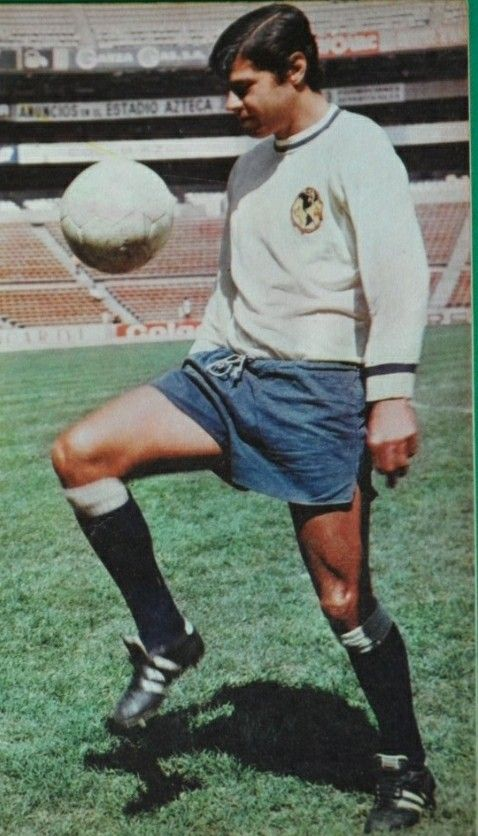
- Fragoso playing for Club América

Personal information
- Full name: Javier Gonzalo Fragoso Rodríguez
- Date of birth: April 19, 1942
- Place of birth: Mexico City, Mexico
- Date of death: December 28, 2014 (aged 72)
- Place of death: Cuernavaca, Morelos, Mexico
- Height: 1.78 m (5 ft 10 in)
- Position: Forward

Senior career*
Years	Team	Apps	(Gls)
1962–1970	América		
1970–1972	Zacatepec		
1972–1973	Puebla		
1973–1974	Zacatepec		

International career
1965–1970	Mexico	46	(19)
Medal record
Men's football
Representing Mexico
Central American and Caribbean Games
Silver medal – second place	Kingston 1962
- * Club domestic league appearances and goals

Javier Gonzalo Fragoso Rodríguez (19 April 1942 – 28 December 2014) was a Mexican football player and manager.

== Club career ==
Born in Mexico City in 1942, he was a forward for Club América, for whom he made his debut in 1962.

== International career ==
Nicknamed Chalo, he also played for the Mexico national team, participating in the 1966 and the 1970 World Cups, and scoring one goal in the latter. He also competed for Mexico at the 1964 Summer Olympics.

=== International goals ===
Scores and results list Mexico's goal tally first.

Goal	Date	Venue	Opponent	Score	Result	Competition
1.	April 1, 1965	Estadio Mateo Flores, Guatemala City, Guatemala	Netherlands Antilles	2–0	5–0	1965 CONCACAF Championship
2.	April 1, 1965	Estadio Mateo Flores, Guatemala City, Guatemala	Netherlands Antilles	3–0	5–0	1965 CONCACAF Championship
3.	April 1, 1965	Estadio Mateo Flores, Guatemala City, Guatemala	Netherlands Antilles	4–0	5–0	1965 CONCACAF Championship
4.	April 4, 1965	Estadio Mateo Flores, Guatemala City, Guatemala	Haiti	3–0	3–0	1965 CONCACAF Championship
5.	April 11, 1965	Estadio Mateo Flores, Guatemala City, Guatemala	Guatemala	2–1	2–1	1965 CONCACAF Championship
6.	May 7, 1965	Estadio Olímpico Universitario, Mexico City, Mexico	Jamaica	1–0	8–0	1966 FIFA World Cup qualification
7.	May 7, 1965	Estadio Olímpico Universitario, Mexico City, Mexico	Jamaica	3–0	8–0	1966 FIFA World Cup qualification
8.	April 24, 1966	Estadio Olímpico Universitario, Mexico City, Mexico	Paraguay	1–0	7–0	Friendly
9.	April 24, 1966	Estadio Olímpico Universitario, Mexico City, Mexico	Paraguay	2–0	7–0	Friendly
10.	April 24, 1966	Estadio Olímpico Universitario, Mexico City, Mexico	Paraguay	7–0	7–0	Friendly
11.	May 29, 1966	Estadio Nacional, Santiago, Chile	Chile	1–0	1–0	Friendly
12.	August 22, 1967	Estadio Azteca, Mexico City, Mexico	Argentina	1–0	2–1	Friendly
13.	August 22, 1967	Estadio Azteca, Mexico City, Mexico	Argentina	2–1	2–1	Friendly
14.	October 31, 1968	Estádio do Maracanã, Rio de Janeiro, Brazil	Brazil	2–1	2–1	Friendly
15.	February 4, 1969	Estadio León, León, Mexico	Colombia	1–0	1–0	Friendly
16.	May 6, 1969	Idrætsparken, Copenhagen, Denmark	Denmark	1–0	3–1	Friendly
17.	May 8, 1969	Ullevaal Stadion, Oslo, Norway	Norway	1–0	2–0	Friendly
18.	May 8, 1969	Ullevaal Stadion, Oslo, Norway	Norway	2–0	2–0	Friendly
19.	June 7, 1970	Estadio Azteca, Mexico City, Mexico	El Salvador	3–0	4–0	1970 FIFA World Cup
