= Football at the 2023 Central American and Caribbean Games – Men's tournament =

2023 men's football tournament

2023 Central American and Caribbean Games – Men's Football Tournament
Tournament details
- Host country: El Salvador
- Dates: 28 June – 6 July
- Teams: 7 (from 1 confederation)
- Venue: 1 (in 1 host city)

Final positions
- Champions: Mexico (7th title)
- Runners-up: Costa Rica
- Third place: Honduras
- Fourth place: El Salvador

Tournament statistics
- Matches played: 13
- Goals scored: 33 (2.54 per match)
- Top scorers: (Costa Rica) Kenneth Vargas; (Mexico) Ettson Ayón; (3 goals each)

The Men's football tournament at the 2023 Central American and Caribbean Games was held in Santa Tecla, El Salvador from 28 June to 6 July.

== Participating teams ==
Seven teams from one confederation participated in the tournament. The seven teams were:

- Centro Caribe Sports (Note: Due to the suspension of the Guatemalan Olympic Committee in 2022, Guatemala is competing at the 2023 Central American and Caribbean Games under the Centro Caribe Sports flag.)
- Costa Rica
- Dominican Republic
- El Salvador (hosts)
- Honduras
- Jamaica
- Mexico

== Squads ==
Teams were restricted to players 22 years old or younger.

== Group stage ==
The tournament's groups were announced on 23 April 2023. Fixtures were announced on 30 May 2023.

=== Group A ===
Pos	Team	Pld	W	D	L	GF	GA	GD	Pts	Qualification
1	Mexico	2	1	1	0	3	1	+2	4	Advance to knockout stage
2	El Salvador (H)	2	0	2	0	2	2	0	2	Advance to knockout stage
3	Dominican Republic	2	0	1	1	1	3	−2	1	

Source: San Salvador 2023
Rules for classification: Tie-breakers
(H) Hosts
28 June
20:00 CST (UTC−6)

Mexico	2–0	Dominican Republic
A. Gómez 8'; Ambríz 39'	Report

Estadio Nacional Las Delicias, Santa Tecla
Referee: Julio Luna (Guatemala)

30 June
20:00 CST (UTC−6)

Dominican Republic	1–1	El Salvador
Messina 71' (pen.)	Report	Cerritos 37'

Estadio Nacional Las Delicias, Santa Tecla
Referee: Christopher Mason (Jamaica)

2 July
20:00 CST (UTC−6)

El Salvador	1–1	Mexico
Vásquez 46'	Report	Carrillo 64'

Estadio Nacional Las Delicias, Santa Tecla
Referee: David Gómez (Costa Rica)

=== Group B ===
Pos	Team	Pld	W	D	L	GF	GA	GD	Pts	Qualification
1	Costa Rica	3	2	0	1	7	1	+6	6	Advance to knockout stage
2	Honduras	3	1	1	1	3	3	0	4	Advance to knockout stage
3	Centro Caribe Sports	3	1	1	1	3	3	0	4	
4	Jamaica	3	0	2	1	2	8	−6	2	

Source: San Salvador 2023
Rules for classification: Tie-breakers
28 June
14:00 CST (UTC−6)

Honduras	1–1	Jamaica
Maldonado 90+2'	Report	Webster 41'

Estadio Nacional Las Delicias, Santa Tecla
Referee: Jaime Herrera (El Salvador)
28 June
17:00 CST (UTC−6)

Costa Rica	0–1	Centro Caribe Sports
	Report	Ortiz 80'

Estadio Nacional Las Delicias, Santa Tecla
Referee: Yadel Martínez (Cuba)

30 June
14:00 CST (UTC−6)

Centro Caribe Sports	1–2	Honduras
Ortiz 16' (pen.)	Report	Arzú 28'; Elvir 46'

Estadio Nacional Las Delicias, Santa Tecla
Referee: Oliver Vergara (Panama)
30 June
17:00 CST (UTC−6)

Jamaica	0–6	Costa Rica
	Report	Acuña 13'; Vargas 24' (pen.); Rodríguez 31', 64'; Zamora 82'; Azofeifa 89'

Estadio Nacional Las Delicias, Santa Tecla
Referee: Filiberto Martínez (El Salvador)

2 July
14:00 CST (UTC−6)

Centro Caribe Sports	1–1	Jamaica
Franco 79'	Report	Daley 50'

Estadio Nacional Las Delicias, Santa Tecla
Referee: Adonis Carrasco (Dominican Republic)
2 July
17:00 CST (UTC−6)

Honduras	0–1	Costa Rica
	Report	Zamora 78'

Estadio Nacional Las Delicias, Santa Tecla
Referee: Diego Montaño (Mexico)

== Knockout stage ==
If necessary, extra time and penalty shoot-out were used to decide the winner.

Semi-finals
4 July – Santa Tecla
Mexico	3
Honduras	0
4 July – Santa Tecla
Costa Rica	2
El Salvador	1

Gold medal match
6 July – Santa Tecla
Mexico	2
Costa Rica	1
Bronze medal match
6 July – Santa Tecla
Honduras	2
El Salvador	1

=== Semi-finals ===
4 July
16:00 CST (UTC−6)

Mexico	3–0	Honduras
López 18'; Ayón 45'; A. Gómez 64'	Report

Estadio Nacional Las Delicias, Santa Tecla
Referee: Yadel Martínez (Cuba)

4 July
19:30 CST (UTC−6)

Costa Rica	2–1	El Salvador
Vargas 33' (pen.), 48'	Report	Sánchez 73'

Estadio Nacional Las Delicias, Santa Tecla
Referee: Nelson Salgado (Honduras)

=== Bronze medal match ===
6 July
16:00 CST (UTC−6)

Honduras	2–1	El Salvador
Núñez 34'; Arzú 86'	Report	Sánchez 48'

Estadio Nacional Las Delicias, Santa Tecla
Referee: David Gómez (Costa Rica)

=== Gold medal match ===
6 July
19:30 CST (UTC−6)

Mexico	2–1	Costa Rica
Ayón 21', 53'	Report	Soto 62'

Estadio Nacional Las Delicias, Santa Tecla
Referee: Filiberto Martínez (El Salvador)

2023 Central American and Caribbean Games
Men's football tournament winners

Mexico
7th title

== Goalscorers ==
There have been 33 goals scored in 13 matches, for an average of 2.54 goals per match.

3 goals

- (Costa Rica) Kenneth Vargas
- (Mexico) Ettson Ayón

2 goals

- Anderson Ortiz
- (Costa Rica) Doryan Rodríguez
- (Costa Rica) Álvaro Zamora
- (El Salvador) Juan Sánchez
- (Honduras) Exon Arzú
- (Mexico) Alejandro Gómez

1 goal

- Jonathan Franco
- (Costa Rica) Sebastian Acuña
- (Costa Rica) Jorkaeff Azofeifa
- (Costa Rica) Andrey Soto
- (Dominican Republic) Fabian Messina
- (El Salvador) Mauricio Cerritos
- (El Salvador) Luis Vásquez
- (Honduras) Samuel Elvir
- (Honduras) Axel Maldonado
- (Honduras) Jonathan Núñez
- (Jamaica) Cristojaye Daley
- (Jamaica) Ronaldo Webster
- (Mexico) Fidel Ambríz
- (Mexico) Jordan Carrillo
- (Mexico) Rodrigo López

Source: San Salvador 2023
