= José Verdecia =

Cuban footballer (born 1944)

Personal information
- Full name: José Verdecia Ochoa
- Date of birth: 13 August 1944 (age 82)
- Place of birth: Manatí, Las Tunas, Cuba
- Position: Centre-forward

Senior career*
Years	Team	Apps	(Gls)
1962–1966	El Relámpago		
1967–1977	Mineros		
1967	→ Oriente (loan)		

International career
1962–1972	Cuba		
Medal record
Men's football
Representing Cuba
Central American and Caribbean Games
Bronze medal – third place	Puerto Rico 1966	Team
Gold medal – first place	Panama 1970	Team
Pan American Games
Bronze medal – third place	Cali 1971	Team
- * Club domestic league appearances and goals

José Verdecia Ochoa (born 13 August 1944) is a Cuban retired footballer. Nicknamed "Pepito", he played as a centre-forward for Mineros throughout the late 1960s and the 1970s. He also represented his native country of Cuba throughout various tournaments, notably being part of the winning squad for the 1971 Pan American Games.

== Club career ==
Born in Manatí, Verdecia began his career with El Relámpago throughout the first half of the 1960s. His success caught the attention of Mineros who signed him to play in the second half of the 1966 Campeonato Nacional de Cuba. He was known for scoring unusual goals from any position on the field through both kicks and headers, becoming a celebrity within children in Manatí that had also wanted to become footballers. Following a brief loan to Oriente in the subsequent 1967 Campeonato Nacional de Cuba. He remained with the club until his retirement in 1977.

== International career ==
Verdecia first played for Cuba in 1962. His first major appearance came through the 1966 Central American and Caribbean Games where he was part of the squad that won bronze for the tournament. He then took part in the 1967 Pan American Games a year later. The 1970s would be defined as the golden age for the Diablos Rojos as his contribution in the subsequent 1970 Central American and Caribbean Games saw the club win their first ever international title. That same year also saw Verdecia take part in their first international tour to play a series of friendlies against North Vietnam. This was followed up with the club receiving bronze at the 1971 Pan American Games and playing in Cuba's debut in the 1971 CONCACAF Championship where the club achieved fourth place.
