= Iván García (footballer) =

Venezuelan footballer (1947-1993)

Personal information
- Date of birth: 18 April 1947
- Date of death: 10 January 1993 (aged 45)
- Position: Forward

International career
| Years | Team | Apps | (Gls) |
| 1975–1981 | Venezuela | 5 | (0) |

Iván García (18 April 1947 – 10 January 1993) was a Venezuelan footballer. He played in five matches for the Venezuela national football team from 1975 to 1981. He was also part of Venezuela's squad for the 1975 Copa América tournament.
