= List of international goals scored by Jared Borgetti =

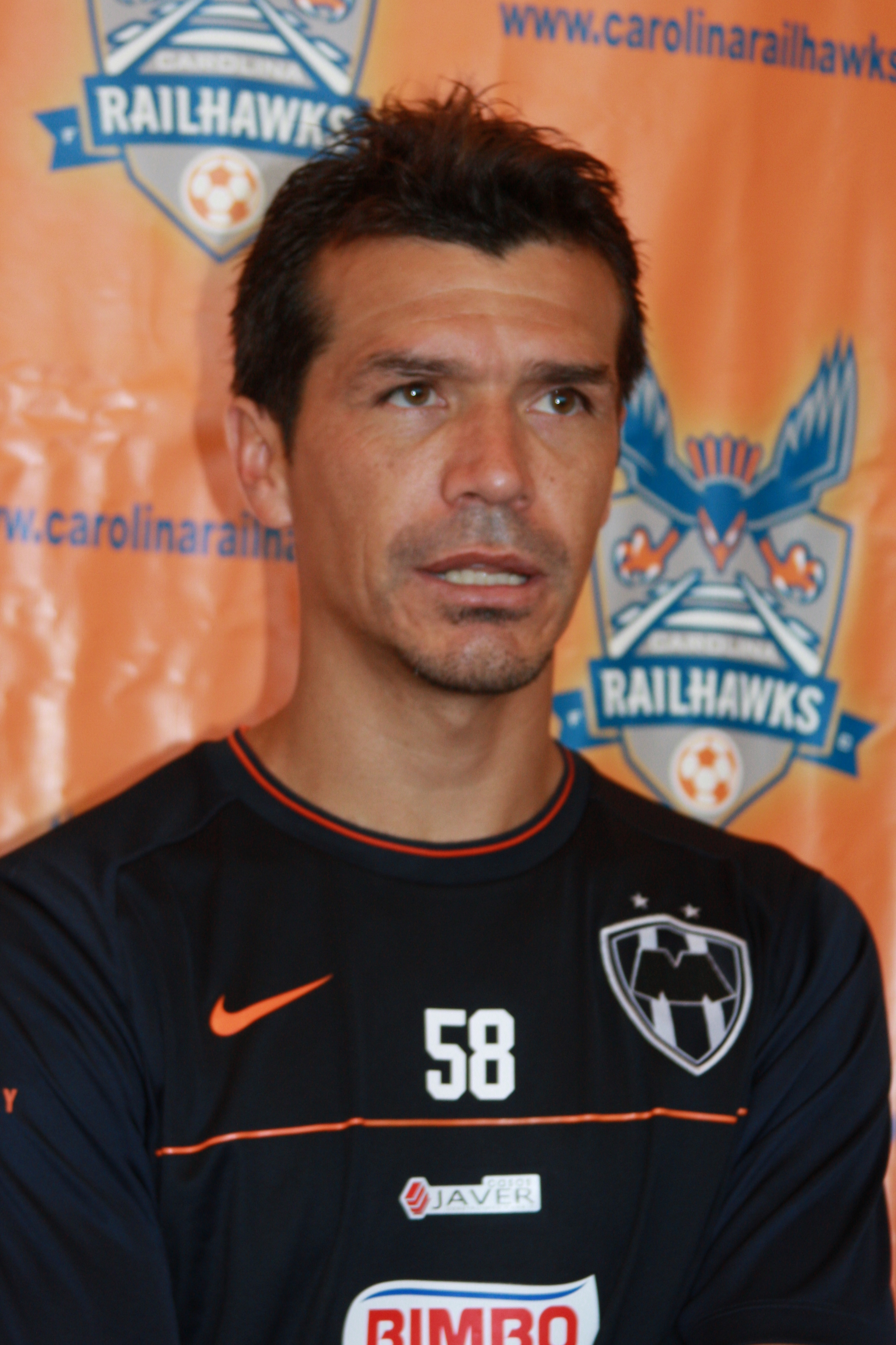
Borgetti scored 46 goals for Mexico.

Jared Borgetti is a retired footballer who represented the Mexico national football team and was his country's all-time highest goalscorer for twelve years with 46 goals until Javier Hernández surpassed him in 2017. He appeared 89 times for Mexico between 1997 and 2008. Called by then national team manager Bora Milutinović making his debut on 5 February 1997 in a friendly against Ecuador at Estadio Azteca, scoring the second goal in a 3–1 victory. Once Milutinović was terminated and upon the arrival of Manuel Lapuente, Borgetti was not included to 1998 World Cup national team roster.

In the 2002 FIFA World Cup, Borgetti scored a memorable header against Italy during the group stage, where Mexico drew 1–1. FIFA has recognized it as “one of the best headers in World Cup history,” noting the technical difficulty of the play: Borgetti turned his head as the ball arrived, curving it into the net while tightly marked by Paolo Maldini, and scoring past Gianluigi Buffon — two players widely regarded among the greatest defender and goalkeeper, respectively, in football history.

Borgetti became his country's top scorer when he scored his 36th goal against Costa Rica in a 2006 FIFA World Cup qualifier in September 2005; at the time the record of 35 was held jointly by Carlos Hermosillo and Luis Hernández.

Out of Borgetti's 46 goals, 37 were in official matches while 9 came in friendlies. Borgetti has scored more goals (five) against Saint Vincent and the Grenadines and Trinidad and Tobago than any other nations. Borgetti scored a hat-trick in a 2002 FIFA World Cup qualifier against Trinidad and Tobago and scored four in a 7–0 victory over Saint Vincent and the Grenadines in a 2006 FIFA World Cup qualifier. Borgetti was the worldwide top scorer in 2006 FIFA World Cup qualification with 14 goals.

== Goals ==
#	Date	Venue	Opponent	Score	Result	Competition
1.	5 February 1997	Estadio Azteca, Mexico City, Mexico	Ecuador	2–0	3–1	Friendly
2.	20 September 2000	Qualcomm Stadium, San Diego, United States	Ecuador	1–0	2–0	Friendly
3.	8 October 2000	Estadio Azteca, Mexico City, Mexico	Trinidad and Tobago	2–0	7–0	2002 FIFA World Cup qualifier
4.	8 October 2000	Estadio Azteca, Mexico City, Mexico	Trinidad and Tobago	4–0	7–0	2002 FIFA World Cup qualifier
5.	8 October 2000	Estadio Azteca, Mexico City, Mexico	Trinidad and Tobago	6–0	7–0	2002 FIFA World Cup qualifier
6.	25 March 2001	Estadio Azteca, Mexico City, Mexico	Jamaica	3–0	4–0	2002 FIFA World Cup qualifier
7.	25 March 2001	Estadio Azteca, Mexico City, Mexico	Jamaica	4–0	4–0	2002 FIFA World Cup qualifier
8.	1 July 2001	Estadio Azteca, Mexico City, Mexico	United States	1–0	1–0	2002 FIFA World Cup qualifier
9.	12 July 2001	Estadio Olímpico Pascual Guerrero, Cali, Colombia	Brazil	1–0	1–0	2001 Copa América
10.	25 July 2001	Estadio Hernán Ramírez Villegas, Pereira, Colombia	Uruguay	1–0	2–1	2001 Copa América
11.	23 August 2001	Estadio Luis "Pirata" Fuente, Veracruz, Mexico	Liberia	3–3	5–4	Friendly
12.	13 March 2002	Qualcomm Stadium, San Diego, United States	Albania	2–0	4–0	Friendly
13.	12 May 2002	Estadio Azteca, Mexico City, Mexico	Colombia	1–0	2–1	Friendly
14.	9 June 2002	Miyagi Stadium, Rifu, Japan	Ecuador	1–1	2–1	2002 FIFA World Cup
15.	13 June 2002	Ōita Stadium, Ōita, Japan	Italy	1–0	1–1	2002 FIFA World Cup
16.	13 July 2003	Estadio Azteca, Mexico City, Mexico	Brazil	1–0	1–0	2003 CONCACAF Gold Cup
17.	20 July 2003	Estadio Azteca, Mexico City, Mexico	Jamaica	4–0	5–0	2003 CONCACAF Gold Cup
18.	24 July 2003	Estadio Azteca, Mexico City, Mexico	Costa Rica	2–0	2–0	2003 CONCACAF Gold Cup
19.	19 June 2004	Alamodome, San Antonio, United States	Dominica	2–0	10–0	2006 FIFA World Cup qualifier
20.	19 June 2004	Alamodome, San Antonio, United States	Dominica	4–0	10–0	2006 FIFA World Cup qualifier
21.	27 June 2004	Estadio Victoria, Aguascalientes, Mexico	Dominica	3–0	8–0	2006 FIFA World Cup qualifier
22.	27 June 2004	Estadio Victoria, Aguascalientes, Mexico	Dominica	5–0	8–0	2006 FIFA World Cup qualifier
23.	8 September 2004	Hasely Crawford Stadium, Port of Spain, Trinidad and Tobago	Trinidad and Tobago	3–0	3–1	2006 FIFA World Cup qualifier
24.	6 October 2004	Estadio Hidalgo, Pachuca, Mexico	Saint Vincent and the Grenadines	1–0	7–0	2006 FIFA World Cup qualifier
25.	6 October 2004	Estadio Hidalgo, Pachuca, Mexico	Saint Vincent and the Grenadines	2–0	7–0	2006 FIFA World Cup qualifier
26.	6 October 2004	Estadio Hidalgo, Pachuca, Mexico	Saint Vincent and the Grenadines	5–0	7–0	2006 FIFA World Cup qualifier
27.	6 October 2004	Estadio Hidalgo, Pachuca, Mexico	Saint Vincent and the Grenadines	6–0	7–0	2006 FIFA World Cup qualifier
28.	10 October 2004	Arnos Vale Stadium, Kingstown, Saint Vincent and the Grenadines	Saint Vincent and the Grenadines	1–0	1–0	2006 FIFA World Cup qualifier
29.	27 March 2005	Estadio Azteca, Mexico City, Mexico	United States	1–0	2–1	2006 FIFA World Cup qualifier
30.	8 June 2005	Estadio Universitario, San Nicolás de los Garza, Mexico	Trinidad and Tobago	1–0	2–0	2006 FIFA World Cup qualifier
31.	19 June 2005	AWD-Arena, Hanover, Germany	Brazil	1–0	1–0	2005 FIFA Confederations Cup
32.	29 June 2005	Zentralstadion, Leipzig, Germany	Germany	2–2	3–4	2005 FIFA Confederations Cup
33.	29 June 2005	Zentralstadion, Leipzig, Germany	Germany	3–3	3–4	2005 FIFA Confederations Cup
34.	10 July 2005	Los Angeles Memorial Coliseum, Los Angeles, United States	Guatemala	1–0	4–0	2005 CONCACAF Gold Cup
35.	10 July 2005	Los Angeles Memorial Coliseum, Los Angeles, United States	Guatemala	2–0	4–0	2005 CONCACAF Gold Cup
36.	17 August 2005	Estadio Azteca, Mexico City, Mexico	Costa Rica	1–0	2–0	2006 FIFA World Cup qualifier
37.	7 September 2005	Estadio Azteca, Mexico City, Mexico	Panama	3–0	5–0	2006 FIFA World Cup qualifier
38.	1 June 2006	Philips Stadion, Eindhoven, Netherlands	Netherlands	1–0	1–2	Friendly
39.	25 March 2007	Estadio Universitario, San Nicolás de los Garza, Mexico	Paraguay	1–0	2–1	Friendly
40.	25 March 2007	Estadio Universitario, San Nicolás de los Garza, Mexico	Paraguay	2–0	2–1	Friendly
41.	2 June 2007	Estadio Alfonso Lastras, San Luis Potosí, Mexico	Iran	1–0	4–0	Friendly
42.	8 June 2007	Giants Stadium, East Rutherford, United States	Cuba	1–1	2–1	2007 CONCACAF Gold Cup
43.	17 June 2007	Reliant Stadium, Houston, United States	Costa Rica	1–0	1–0	2007 CONCACAF Gold Cup
44.	15 June 2008	Reliant Stadium, Houston, United States	Belize	2–0	2–0	2010 FIFA World Cup qualifier
45.	22 June 2008	Estadio Universitario, San Nicolás de los Garza, Mexico	Belize	5–0	7–0	2010 FIFA World Cup qualifier
46.	22 June 2008	Estadio Universitario, San Nicolás de los Garza, Mexico	Belize	7–0	7–0	2010 FIFA World Cup qualifier

== Statistics ==
Goals by year
Year	Apps	Goals
1997	1	1
1998	0	0
1999	0	0
2000	6	4
2001	21	6
2002	9	4
2003	11	3
2004	12	10
2005	17	9
2006	5	1
2007	9	5
2008	3	3
Total	89	46

Goals by competition
Competition	Goals
FIFA World Cup qualification	23
Friendlies	9
CONCACAF Gold Cup	7
FIFA Confederations Cup	3
FIFA World Cup	2
Copa América	2
Total	46

Goals by Confederation
Confederation	Goals
CONCACAF	29
CONMEBOL	10
UEFA	5
AFC	1
CAF	1
Total	46
