= Football at the 1998 Central American and Caribbean Games =

1998 - Football at the Central American and Caribbean Games

Tournament details
- Host country: Venezuela
- City: Maracaibo
- Dates: 9 August – 21 August
- Teams: 12 (from 2 confederations)
- Venue(s): 1 (in 1 host city)

Final positions
- Champions: Venezuela (2nd title)
- Runners-up: Mexico
- Third place: Costa Rica
- Fourth place: Trinidad and Tobago
- All statistics correct as of 2009-06-22.

The football competition at the 1998 Central American and Caribbean Games started on 9 August, although qualification took place beforehand.

== Participants ==
- Barbados
- Colombia
- Costa Rica
- Cuba
- El Salvador
- Guatemala
- Jamaica
- Mexico
- Nicaragua
- Panama
- Trinidad and Tobago
- Venezuela (Hosts)

== Group A ==
1998-08-09

Venezuela	7 - 0	Barbados

Maracaibo
1998-08-09

Nicaragua	2 - 1	Trinidad and Tobago

Maracaibo

1998-08-11

Barbados	0 - 1	Trinidad and Tobago

Maracaibo
1998-08-11

Venezuela	3 - 0	Nicaragua

Maracaibo

1998-08-13

Barbados	1 - 0	Nicaragua

Maracaibo
1998-08-13

Venezuela	3 - 1	Trinidad and Tobago

Maracaibo

=== Standings ===
#	Team	P	W	D	L	F	A	PTS	+/-
1	Venezuela	3	3	0	0	13	1	9	+12
2	Trinidad and Tobago	3	1	0	2	3	5	3	-2
3	Nicaragua	3	1	0	2	2	5	3	-3
4	Barbados	3	1	0	2	1	8	3	-7

- Venezuela, Trinidad and Tobago and Nicaragua qualified to Final round.

== Group B ==
1998-08-10

Colombia	2 - 3	Jamaica

Maracaibo
1998-08-10

Costa Rica	3 - 0	Guatemala

Maracaibo

1998-08-12

Colombia	2 - 4	Guatemala

Maracaibo
1998-08-12

Costa Rica	1 - 0	Jamaica

Maracaibo

1998-08-14

Colombia	1 - 0	Costa Rica

Maracaibo
1998-08-14

Guatemala	0 - 4	Jamaica

Maracaibo

=== Standings ===
#	Team	P	W	D	L	F	A	PTS	+/-
1	Jamaica	3	2	0	1	7	3	6	+4
2	Costa Rica	3	2	0	1	4	1	6	+3
3	Colombia	3	1	0	2	5	7	3	-2
4	Guatemala	3	1	0	2	4	9	3	-5

- Jamaica, Costa Rica and Colombia qualified to Final round.

== Group C ==
1998-08-09

El Salvador	0 - 1	Mexico

Maracaibo
1998-08-09

Cuba	0 - 0	Panama

Maracaibo

1998-08-11

Mexico	2 - 0	Panama

Maracaibo
1998-08-11

Cuba	1 - 1	El Salvador

Maracaibo

1998-08-13

Cuba	1 - 3	Mexico

Maracaibo
1998-08-13

El Salvador	3 - 1	Panama

Maracaibo

=== Standings ===
#	Team	P	W	D	L	F	A	PTS	+/-
1	Mexico	3	3	0	0	6	1	9	+5
2	El Salvador	3	1	1	1	4	3	4	+1
3	Cuba	3	0	2	1	2	4	2	-2
4	Panama	3	0	1	2	1	5	1	-4

- Mexico and El Salvador qualified to Final round.

== Final round ==
=== Quarterfinals ===
1998-08-16

Jamaica	2 - 3	Trinidad and Tobago

Maracaibo
1998-08-16

Venezuela	8 - 1	Nicaragua

Maracaibo
1998-08-17

Costa Rica	1 - 0	El Salvador

Maracaibo
1998-08-17

Colombia	0 - 2	Mexico

Maracaibo

=== Semifinals ===
1998-08-18

Venezuela	5 - 2	Trinidad and Tobago

Maracaibo
1998-08-19

Costa Rica	0 - 2	Mexico

Maracaibo

=== Third place ===
1998-08-21

Costa Rica	6 - 1	Trinidad and Tobago

Maracaibo

=== Final ===
1998-08-21

Venezuela	3 - 1	Mexico

Maracaibo

1998 Central American
and Caribbean Games

Venezuela
2nd title
