= Football at the 1990 Central American and Caribbean Games =

1990 - Football at the Central American and Caribbean Games
Tournament details
- Host country: Mexico
- City: Toluca
- Dates: 21 November – 3 December
- Teams: 9 (from 2 confederations)
- Venue: 1 (in 1 host city)

Final positions
- Champions: Mexico (5th title)
- Runners-up: Venezuela
- Third place: Costa Rica
- Fourth place: Cuba

Tournament statistics
- Matches played: 17
- Goals scored: 56 (3.29 per match)

The football competition at the 1990 Central American and Caribbean Games started on 21 November.

== Participants ==
- Antigua and Barbuda
- Costa Rica
- Cuba
- Dominican Republic
- Mexico (Hosts)
- Netherlands Antilles
- Trinidad and Tobago
- Suriname
- Venezuela

== Group A ==
1990-11-21

Mexico	5 - 1	Dominican Republic

Toluca
1990-11-23

Antigua and Barbuda	2 - 2	Dominican Republic

Toluca
1990-11-25

Mexico	8 - 0	Antigua and Barbuda

Toluca

=== Standings ===
#	Team	P	W	D	L	F	A	PTS	+/-
1	Mexico	2	2	0	0	13	1	4	+12
2	Dominican Republic	2	0	1	1	3	7	1	-4
3	Antigua and Barbuda	2	0	1	1	2	10	1	-8

== Group B ==
1990-11-21

Costa Rica	4 - 0	Netherlands Antilles

Toluca
1990-11-23

Netherlands Antilles	0 - 3	Trinidad and Tobago

Toluca
1990-11-25

Costa Rica	5 - 0	Trinidad and Tobago

Toluca

=== Standings ===
#	Team	P	W	D	L	F	A	PTS	+/-
1	Costa Rica	2	2	0	0	9	0	4	+9
2	Trinidad and Tobago	2	1	0	1	3	5	2	-2
3	Netherlands Antilles	2	0	0	2	0	7	0	-7

== Group C ==
1990-11-21

Cuba	0 - 0	Suriname

Toluca
1990-11-23

Suriname	0 - 2	Venezuela

Toluca
1990-11-25

Cuba	0 - 1	Venezuela

Toluca

=== Standings ===
#	Team	P	W	D	L	F	A	PTS	+/-
1	Venezuela	2	2	0	0	3	0	4	+3
2	Cuba	2	0	1	1	0	1	1	-1
3	Suriname	2	0	1	1	0	2	1	-2

== Second round ==
=== Group 1 ===
1990-11-27

Mexico	1 - 0	Cuba

Toluca
1990-11-29

Cuba	2 - 0	Trinidad and Tobago

Toluca
1990-12-01

Mexico	3 - 0	Trinidad and Tobago

Toluca

=== Standings ===
#	Team	P	W	D	L	F	A	PTS	+/-
1	Mexico	2	2	0	0	4	0	4	+4
2	Cuba	2	1	0	1	2	1	2	+1
3	Trinidad and Tobago	2	0	0	2	0	5	0	-5

=== Group 2 ===
1990-11-27

Costa Rica	4 - 1	Dominican Republic

Toluca
1990-11-29

Dominican Republic	1 - 5	Venezuela

Toluca
1990-12-01

Costa Rica	0 - 0	Venezuela

Toluca

=== Standings ===
#	Team	P	W	D	L	F	A	PTS	+/-
1	Venezuela	2	1	1	0	5	1	3	+4
2	Costa Rica	2	1	1	0	4	1	3	+3
3	Dominican Republic	2	0	0	2	2	9	0	-7

=== Third Place ===
1990-12-03

Costa Rica	2 - 1	Cuba

Toluca

=== Final ===
1990-12-03

Mexico	3 - 0	Venezuela

Toluca

1990 Central American
and Caribbean Games

Mexico
5th title
