= Football at the 1986 Central American and Caribbean Games =

Fútbol en los Juegos Centroamericanos y del Caribe 1986

Tournament details
- Host country: Dominican Republic
- Dates: June – 4 July 1986
- Teams: 9 (from 1 confederation)
- Venue(s): 1 (in 1 host city)

Final positions
- Champions: Cuba (5th title)
- Runners-up: Honduras
- Third place: Mexico
- Fourth place: Dominican Republic
- All statistics correct as of 4 July 1986.

Football was contested for men only at the 1986 Central American and Caribbean Games in Santo Domingo, Dominican Republic.

| Event | Gold | Silver | Bronze |
|---|---|---|---|
| Men's football | Cuba (CUB) | Honduras (HON) | Mexico (MEX) |

== Participants ==
- Antigua and Barbuda
- Bahamas
- Barbados
- Cuba
- Dominican Republic (Hosts)
- Guatemala (Withdrew)
- Honduras
- Mexico
- Netherlands Antilles
- Nicaragua
- Puerto Rico

== Group A ==
| Pos | Team | Pld | W | D | L | GF | GA | GD | Pts | Qualification |
|---|---|---|---|---|---|---|---|---|---|---|
| 1 | Antigua and Barbuda | 1 | 0 | 1 | 0 | 1 | 1 | 0 | 1 | Qualified to Quarterfinals |
| 2 | Dominican Republic | 1 | 0 | 1 | 0 | 1 | 1 | 0 | 1 | Qualified to Quarterfinals |

| June 1986 Day 1 | Dominican Republic | 1–1 | Antigua and Barbuda | Dominican Republic |
| AST |

== Group B ==
| Pos | Team | Pld | W | D | L | GF | GA | GD | Pts | Qualification |
|---|---|---|---|---|---|---|---|---|---|---|
| 1 | Cuba | 1 | 1 | 0 | 0 | 4 | 0 | +4 | 2 | Qualified to Quarterfinals |
| 2 | Puerto Rico | 1 | 0 | 0 | 1 | 0 | 4 | −4 | 0 | Qualified to Quarterfinals |
| 3 | Guatemala | 0 | 0 | 0 | 0 | 0 | 0 | 0 | 0 | Withdrew |

| June 1986 Day 1 | Cuba | 4–0 | Puerto Rico | Dominican Republic |
| AST |

== Group C ==
| Pos | Team | Pld | W | D | L | GF | GA | GD | Pts | Qualification |
|---|---|---|---|---|---|---|---|---|---|---|
| 1 | Honduras | 2 | 2 | 0 | 0 | 3 | 0 | +3 | 4 | Qualified to Quarterfinals |
| 2 | Barbados | 2 | 0 | 1 | 1 | 1 | 2 | −1 | 1 | Qualified to Quarterfinals |
| 3 | Netherlands Antilles | 2 | 0 | 1 | 1 | 1 | 3 | −2 | 1 | Eliminated |

| 25 June 1986 | Netherlands Antilles | 0–2 | Honduras | Dominican Republic |
| AST |

| 26 June 1986 | Netherlands Antilles | 1–1 | Barbados | Dominican Republic |
| AST |

| 28 June 1986 | Barbados | 0–1 | Honduras | Dominican Republic |
| AST |

== Group D ==
| Pos | Team | Pld | W | D | L | GF | GA | GD | Pts | Qualification |
|---|---|---|---|---|---|---|---|---|---|---|
| 1 | Mexico | 0 | 0 | 0 | 0 | 0 | 0 | 0 | 0 | Qualified to Quarterfinals |
| 2 | Bahamas | 0 | 0 | 0 | 0 | 0 | 0 | 0 | 0 | Qualified to Quarterfinals |

Both Mexico and Bahamas advanced to the quarterfinals, results unknown.

== Knockout stage ==
=== Bracket ===
Quarter-finals
30 June 1986
Antigua and Barbuda(a.e.t.) | 0
Honduras | 1
30 June 1986
Dominican Republic | 3
Barbados | 1
30 June 1986
Bahamas | 0
Cuba | 4
30 June 1986
Mexico | 4
Puerto Rico | 0

Semi-finals
2 July 1986
Dominican Republic | 0
Honduras | 2
2 July 1986
Cuba | 2
Mexico | 0

Final
4 July 1986
Cuba (p) | 3
Honduras | 2
Third place
4 July 1986
Dominican Republic | 1
Mexico | 2

| 30 June 1986 | Antigua and Barbuda | 0–1 (a.e.t.) | Honduras | Dominican Republic |
| AST |

| 30 June 1986 | Dominican Republic | 3–1 | Barbados | Dominican Republic |
| AST |

| 30 June 1986 | Bahamas | 0–4 | Cuba | Dominican Republic |
| AST |

| 30 June 1986 | Mexico | 4–0 | Puerto Rico | Dominican Republic |
| AST |

=== Semifinals ===
| 2 July 1986 | Dominican Republic | 0–2 | Honduras | Dominican Republic |
| AST |

| 2 July 1986 | Cuba | 2–0 | Mexico | Dominican Republic |
| AST |

=== Bronze medal match ===
| 4 July 1986 | Dominican Republic | 1–2 | Mexico | Dominican Republic |
| AST |

=== Final ===
| 4 July 1986 | Cuba | 1–1 (4–2 p) | Honduras | Dominican Republic |
| AST |
