= Football at the 1959 Central American and Caribbean Games =

Tournament details
- Host country: Venezuela
- Dates: 7–16 January
- Teams: 5 (from 2 confederations)
- Venue: 1 (in 1 host city)

Final positions
- Champions: Mexico (3rd title)
- Runners-up: Netherlands Antilles
- Third place: Venezuela
- Fourth place: Panama

Tournament statistics
- Matches played: 10
- Goals scored: 50 (5 per match)
- Top scorer(s): (Netherlands Antilles) Erno Jansen (8 goals)

Football was contested for men only at the 1959 Central American and Caribbean Games in Caracas, Venezuela.

The gold medal was won by Mexico for the third time, who earned 8 points

== Participating teams ==
Team	Appearance	Previous best performance
Mexico	5th	Gold medal (1935, 1938)
Netherlands Antilles	3rd	Gold medal (1950)
Panama	4th	Silver medal (1946)
Puerto Rico	2nd	7th (1946)
Venezuela	3rd	5th (1946)

Event	Gold	Silver	Bronze
Men's football	Mexico (MEX)	Netherlands Antilles (AHO)	Venezuela (VEN)

== Table ==
A 2-point system used.

Pos	Team	Pld	W	D	L	GF	GA	GD	Pts
1	Mexico (C)	4	4	0	0	10	3	+7	8
2	Netherlands Antilles	4	2	1	1	21	5	+16	5
3	Venezuela	4	1	2	1	12	7	+5	4
4	Panama	4	1	1	2	6	9	−3	3
5	Puerto Rico	4	0	0	4	1	26	−25	0

(C) Champions

== Results ==
7 January 1959

Netherlands Antilles	15–0	Puerto Rico
Jansen 8', 48', 53', 65', 84'; Valerian 18'; Gumbs 21', 86'; Canword 29', 56', 88'; Dirksz 40'; Cameron 53'; Bibiana 70', 76'	Report

Estadio Olímpico de la UCV, Caracas
8 January 1959

Mexico	3–1	Panama
Contreras 29'; Arias 52', 64'	Report	Valderrama 86'

Estadio Olímpico de la UCV, Caracas
9 January 1959

Netherlands Antilles	2–2	Venezuela
Jansen 4', 65'	Report	Tovar 42'; Rodríguez 47'

Estadio Olímpico de la UCV, Caracas
10 January 1959

Puerto Rico	1–2	Panama
Piñeiro 21'	Report	Ponce 25', 55'

Estadio Olímpico de la UCV, Caracas
11 January 1959

Mexico	3–1	Venezuela
Contreras 17'; Arias 26'; Noriega 67'	Report	Alterio 87'

Estadio Olímpico de la UCV, Caracas
12 January 1959

Panama	1–3	Netherlands Antilles
Ponce 59'	Report	Bernardina 56'; Valerian 63'; Jansen 67'

Estadio Olímpico de la UCV, Caracas
13 January 1959

Mexico	2–0	Puerto Rico
Noriega 22'; Díez 87'	Report

Estadio Olímpico de la UCV, Caracas
14 January 1959

Venezuela	2–2	Panama
Estrada 31'; Vidal 48'	Report	Valderrama 50'; Ponce 75'

Estadio Olímpico de la UCV, Caracas
15 January 1959

Netherlands Antilles	1–2	Mexico
Bibiana 84'	Report	Arias 10', 79'

Estadio Olímpico de la UCV, Caracas
16 January 1959

Venezuela	7–0	Puerto Rico
Casado 22'; Vidal 53', 66', 79'; Rodríguez 73'; Estrada 84'; Tovar 87'	Report

Estadio Olímpico de la UCV, Caracas

1959 Central American
and Caribbean Games

Mexico
3rd title

== Statistics ==
=== Goalscorers ===
There were 50 goals scored in 10 matches, for an average of 5 goals per match.

8 goals

- (Netherlands Antilles) Erno Jansen

5 goals

- (Mexico) José Manuel Arias

4 goals

- (Panama) Luis Carlos Ponce
- (Venezuela) José Ángel Vidal

3 goals

- (Netherlands Antilles) Jose Bibiana
- (Netherlands Antilles) Wilhelm Canword

2 goals

- (Netherlands Antilles) Johan Gumbs
- (Netherlands Antilles) Romualdo Valerian
- (Mexico) Javier Contreras
- (Mexico) Fernando Noriega
- (Panama) Carlos Valderrama
- (Venezuela) Antonio Rodríguez
- (Venezuela) Alí Tovar
- (Venezuela) Florencio Estrada

1 goal

- (Netherlands Antilles) Eustaquio Bernardina
- (Netherlands Antilles) Edwin Dirksz
- (Netherlands Antilles) Rudy Cameron
- (Mexico) Jorge Díez
- (Puerto Rico) Rubén Piñeiro
- (Venezuela) Aniello Alterio
- (Venezuela) Jorge Casado
