= Football at the 1993 Central American and Caribbean Games =

1993 - Football at the Central American and Caribbean Games

Tournament details
- Host country: Puerto Rico
- City: Arroyo
- Dates: 20 November – 29 November
- Teams: 8 (from 2 confederations)
- Venue(s): 1 (in 1 host city)

Final positions
- Champions: Costa Rica (1st title)
- Runners-up: Mexico
- Third place: Cuba
- Fourth place: Jamaica

Tournament statistics
- Matches played: 18
- Goals scored: 66 (3.67 per match)

The football competition at the 1993 Central American and Caribbean Games started on 20 November, although qualification took place beforehand. The games were played at Complejo Deportivo Max Sáchez at Arroyo, Puerto Rico.

== Participants ==
- Cayman Islands
- Colombia
- Costa Rica
- Cuba
- Jamaica
- Mexico
- Puerto Rico (Hosts)
- Trinidad and Tobago

== Group A ==
1993-11-20

Puerto Rico	1 - 4	Mexico
Manolo Santiago 46'

Arroyo
1993-11-20

Costa Rica	2 - 0	Trinidad and Tobago
Ronaldo Gómez Gómez 9' Sergio Morales 36'

Arroyo

1993-11-22

Puerto Rico	0 - 8	Trinidad and Tobago
		Jerry Nixon 19' 38' 62' 73' 76' Lindon Andrews 61' Marvin Oliver 79' David Shurland 88'

Arroyo
1993-11-22

Costa Rica	1 - 0	Mexico
Ronaldo Gómez Gómez 6'

Arroyo

1993-11-24

Mexico	5 - 0	Trinidad and Tobago

Arroyo
1993-11-24

Puerto Rico	0 - 8	Costa Rica

Arroyo

=== Standings ===
#	Team	P	W	D	L	F	A	PTS	+/-
1	Costa Rica	3	3	0	0	11	0	6	+11
2	Mexico	3	2	0	1	9	2	4	+7
3	Trinidad and Tobago	3	1	0	2	8	7	2	+1
4	Puerto Rico	3	0	0	3	1	20	0	-19

== Group B ==
1993-11-21

Cayman Islands	0 - 3	Colombia

Arroyo
1993-11-21

Cuba	1 - 1	Jamaica

Arroyo

1993-11-23

Cayman Islands	0 - 3	Cuba

Arroyo
1993-11-23

Colombia	0 - 0	Jamaica

Arroyo

1993-11-25

Colombia	3 - 4	Cuba

Arroyo
1993-11-25

Cayman Islands	0 - 3	Jamaica

Arroyo

=== Standings ===
#	Team	P	W	D	L	F	A	PTS	+/-
1	Cuba	3	2	1	0	8	4	5	+4
2	Jamaica	3	1	2	0	4	1	4	+3
3	Colombia	3	1	1	1	6	4	3	+2
4	Cayman Islands	3	0	0	3	0	9	0	-9

== Final round ==
=== Semifinals ===
1993-11-27

Costa Rica	2 - 1	Jamaica

Arroyo

1993-11-27

Cuba	0 - 2	Mexico

Arroyo

=== Seventh Place ===
1993-11-28

Puerto Rico	1 - 3	Cayman Islands

Arroyo

=== Fifth Place ===
1993-11-28

Colombia	2 - 2	Trinidad and Tobago
Penalties
	4 - 5

Arroyo

=== Third Place ===
1993-11-29

Cuba	3 - 1	Jamaica

Arroyo

=== Final ===
1993-11-29
19:00

Costa Rica	2 - 0	Mexico
Fonseca 40'; Muñoz 49'

Ponce
Attendance: 600

1993 Central American
and Caribbean Games

Costa Rica
1st title
