= 1978 FIFA World Cup qualification =

1978 FIFA World Cup Qualification
Tournament details
- Dates: 7 March 1976 – 11 December 1977
- Teams: 107 (from 6 confederations)

Tournament statistics
- Matches played: 252
- Goals scored: 721 (2.86 per match)
- Top scorer: (Italy) Roberto Bettega (9 goals)

A total of 107 teams entered the 1978 FIFA World Cup qualification rounds, which began with the preliminary qualification draw on 20 November 1975 at Guatemala City. Argentina, as the hosts, and West Germany, as the defending champions, qualified automatically, leaving 14 spots open for competition.

The 16 places would be distributed among the continental zones as follows:

- Europe (UEFA): 9 or 10 places. One place went to automatic qualifier West Germany, while nine places were contested by 31 teams. The team coming ninth in qualifying would advance to the intercontinental play-offs against a team from CONMEBOL.
- South America (CONMEBOL): 3 or 4 places. One place automatically went to host nation Argentina, while the other three places were contested by nine teams. The team coming third in qualifying would advance to the intercontinental play-offs (against a team from UEFA).
- North, Central America and Caribbean (CONCACAF): 1 place, contested by 16 teams.
- Africa (CAF): 1 place, contested by 26 teams.
- Asia (AFC) and Oceania (OFC): 1 place, contested by 22 teams.

A total of 95 teams played at least one qualifying match. A total of 252 qualifying matches were played, and 721 goals were scored (an average of 2.86 per match).

== Qualified teams ==
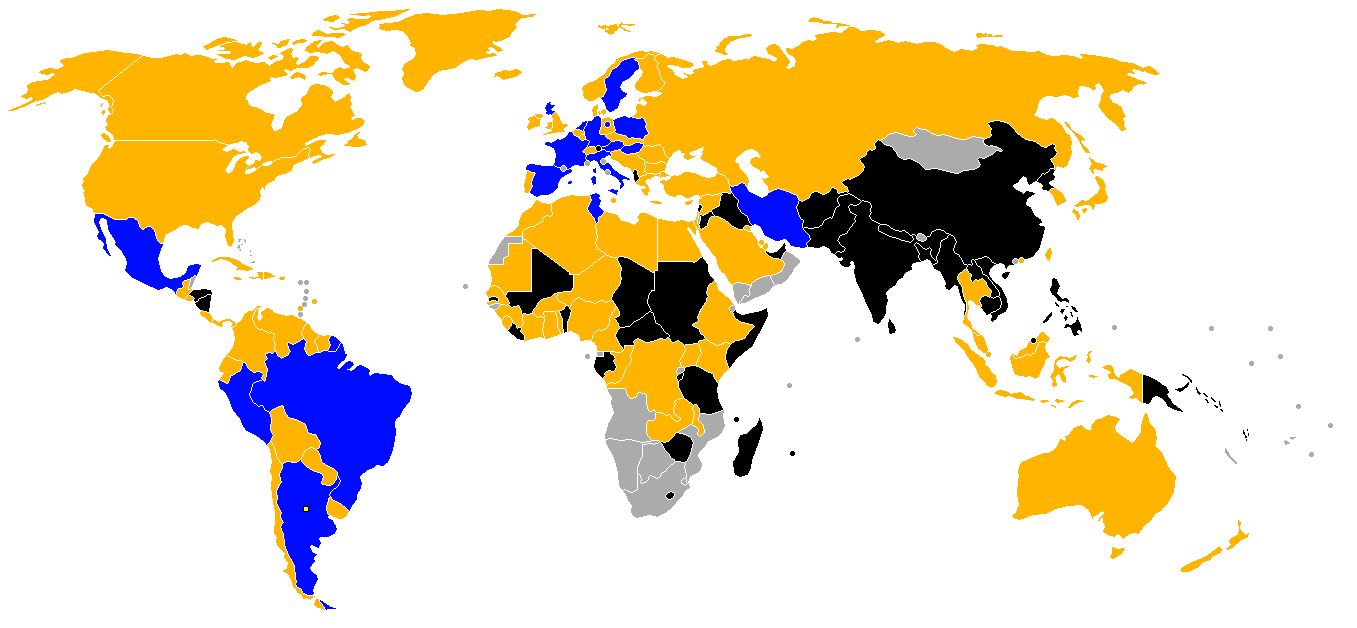
Country qualified for World Cup Country failed to qualify Country did not enter World Cup Country not a FIFA member

The following 16 teams qualified for the 1978 FIFA World Cup:

Team	Date of qualification	Finals appearance	Streak	Last appearance
Argentina (hosts)	6 July 1966	7th	2	1974
Austria	30 October 1977	4th	1	1958
Brazil	14 July 1977	11th	11	1974
France	16 November 1977	7th	1	1966
Hungary	30 November 1977	7th	1	1966
Iran	25 November 1977	1st	1	—
Italy	3 December 1977	9th	5	1974
Mexico	19 October 1977	8th	1	1970
Netherlands	26 October 1977	4th	2	1974
Peru	17 July 1977	3rd	1	1970
Poland	29 October 1977	3rd	2	1974
Scotland	12 October 1977	4th	2	1974
Spain	30 November 1977	5th	1	1966
Sweden	30 October 1977	7th	3	1974
Tunisia	11 December 1977	1st	1	—
West Germany (defending champions)	7 July 1974	9th	7	1974

== Confederation qualification ==
=== AFC and OFC ===
==== Final round ====
Rank	Team	Pts	Pld	Qualification
1	Iran	14	8	Final Tournament
2	South Korea	10	8	
3	Kuwait	9	8	
4	Australia	7	8	
5	Hong Kong	0	8	

Iran qualified.

=== CAF ===
==== Final round ====
Rank	Team	Pts	Pld	Qualification
1	Tunisia	5	4	Final Tournament
2	Egypt	4	4	
3	Nigeria	3	4	

Tunisia qualified.

=== CONCACAF ===
Rank	Team	Pts	Pld	Qualification
1	Mexico	10	5	Final Tournament
2	Haiti	7	5	
3	El Salvador	5	5	
4	Canada	5	5	
5	Guatemala	3	5	
6	Suriname	0	5	

Mexico qualified.

=== CONMEBOL ===
==== Final round ====
Rank	Team	Pts	Pld	Qualification
1	Brazil	4	2	Final Tournament
2	Peru	2	2	Final Tournament
3	Bolivia	0	2	

Brazil and Peru qualified. Bolivia advanced to the inter-confederation play-offs.

=== UEFA ===
Group 1
Group 2
Group 3

Pos	Team	Pld	Pts
1	Poland	6	11
2	Portugal	6	9
3	Denmark	6	4
4	Cyprus	6	0

Pos	Team	Pld	Pts
1	Italy	6	10
2	England	6	10
3	Finland	6	4
4	Luxembourg	6	0

Pos	Team	Pld	Pts
1	Austria	6	10
2	East Germany	6	9
3	Turkey	6	5
4	Malta	6	0

Group 4
Group 5
Group 6

Pos	Team	Pld	Pts
1	Netherlands	6	11
2	Belgium	6	6
3	Northern Ireland	6	5
4	Iceland	6	2

Pos	Team	Pld	Pts
1	France	4	5
2	Bulgaria	4	4
3	Republic of Ireland	4	3

Pos	Team	Pld	Pts
1	Sweden	4	6
2	Norway	4	4
3	Switzerland	4	2

Group 7
Group 8
Group 9

Pos	Team	Pld	Pts
1	Scotland	4	6
2	Czechoslovakia	4	4
3	Wales	4	2

Pos	Team	Pld	Pts
1	Spain	4	6
2	Romania	4	4
3	Yugoslavia	4	2

Pos	Team	Pld	Pts
1	Hungary	4	5
2	Soviet Union	4	4
3	Greece	4	3

Hungary advanced to the UEFA–CONMEBOL play-off.

== Inter-confederation play-offs: UEFA v CONMEBOL ==
The teams would play against each other on a home-and-away basis. The winner would qualify.

Team 1	Agg.	Team 2	1st leg	2nd leg
Hungary	9–2	Bolivia	6–0	3–2

== Goalscorers ==
9 goals

- (Italy) Roberto Bettega

7 goals

- (Austria) Hans Krankl
- (Haiti) Emmanuel Sanon
- (El Salvador) Luis Ramírez Zapata
- (New Zealand) Keith Nelson

6 goals

- (Australia) John Kosmina
- (Australia) Peter Ollerton
- (Egypt) Mahmoud El Khatib
- (Haiti) Leintz Domingue
- (Kuwait) Faisal Al-Dakhil
- (Mexico) Víctor Rangel

5 goals

- (Brazil) Zico
- (East Germany) Martin Hoffmann
- (Guatemala) Óscar Enrique Sánchez
- (Haiti) Pierre Bayonne
- (Iran) Ghafour Jahani
- (South Korea) Cha Bum-kun
- (Suriname) Roy George
- (Turkey) Cemil Turan

4 goals

- (Brazil) Roberto Dinamite
- (Canada) Buzz Parsons
- (East Germany) Joachim Streich
- (England) Kevin Keegan
- (Guatemala) Felix McDonald
- (Hong Kong) Chung Chor Wai
- (Iran) Hassan Roshan
- (Kuwait) Abdulaziz Al-Anberi
- (Kuwait) Jasem Yaqoub
- (Malaysia) James Wong
- (Mexico) Hugo Sánchez
- (Nigeria) Segun Odegbami
- (Poland) Kazimierz Deyna
- (Poland) Grzegorz Lato
- (Portugal) Manuel Fernandes
- (Suriname) Remie Olmberg
- (Sweden) Thomas Sjöberg
- (Trinidad and Tobago) Steve David

3 goals

- (Australia) Attila Abonyi
- (Australia) Jimmy Rooney
- (Barbados) Victor Clarke
- (Bolivia) Miguel Aguilar
- (Bolivia) Carlos Aragonés
- (Bolivia) Porfirio Jiménez
- (Costa Rica) Javier Jiménez
- (Ivory Coast) Kobenan Kouman
- (Ivory Coast) Jérôme Lèbre Mamahou
- (Egypt) Mostafa Abdou
- (England) Mick Channon
- (El Salvador) Elmer Rosas
- (France) Michel Platini
- (Guatemala) Selvin Pennant
- (Guinea) Papa Camara
- (Hong Kong) Kwok Ka Ming
- (Hong Kong) Wun Chee Keung
- (Hungary) Tibor Nyilasi
- (Kuwait) Fat'hi Kameel Fayaz Matar Marzouq
- (Italy) Francesco Graziani
- (Netherlands) Ruud Geels
- (Nigeria) Thompson Usiyan
- (Northern Ireland) Chris McGrath
- (New Zealand) Steve Sumner
- (Peru) José Velásquez
- (South Korea) Park Sang-in
- (Thailand) Jesdaporn Naphatalung
- (Tunisia) Mohamed Akid
- (Socialist Federal Republic of Yugoslavia) Safet Sušić

2 goals

- (Austria) Josef Stering
- (Bahrain) Fuad Abou Shaqr
- (Belgium) Raoul Lambert
- (Brazil) Gilberto Alves
- (Brazil) Marinho Chagas
- (Bulgaria) Pavel Panov
- (Canada) Mike Bakić
- (Canada) Bob Bolitho
- (Canada) Brian Budd
- (Canada) Bob Lenarduzzi
- (Cameroon) Roger Milla
- (Chile) Elías Figueroa
- (Republic of the Congo) Jean-Jacques N'Domba
- (Costa Rica) Johnny Alvarado
- (Ivory Coast) Leon Goua G'Bize
- (Cuba) Francisco Fariñas
- (Denmark) Lars Bastrup
- (Denmark) Henning Munk Jensen
- (Denmark) Per Røntved
- (Denmark) Allan Simonsen
- (East Germany) Hartmut Schade
- (England) Ray Kennedy
- (Egypt) Farouk Gaafar
- (El Salvador) David Cabrera
- (El Salvador) Norberto Huezo
- (El Salvador) Víctor Valencia
- (Finland) Aki Heiskanen
- (Finland) Esa Heiskanen
- (Finland) Olavi Rissanen
- (Greece) Mimis Papaioannou
- (Guatemala) Mario Alfaro
- (Guatemala) José Emilio Mitrovich
- (Guatemala) Peter Sandoval
- (Guatemala) Sergio Rivera
- (Haiti) Arsène Auguste
- (Hong Kong) Lau Wing Yip
- (Hungary) Zoltán Kereki
- (Hungary) András Törőcsik
- (Iran) Hossein Kazerani
- (Iran) Gholam Hossein Mazloumi
- (Israel) Oded Machnes
- (Italy) Giancarlo Antognoni
- (Kuwait) Hamad Khalid Bo Hamad
- (Malaysia) Isa Bakar
- (Mexico) Alacrán Jiménez
- (Mexico) Javier Cárdenas
- (Mexico) Javier Guzmán
- (Mexico) Raúl Isiordia
- (Netherlands) Johan Cruyff
- (Netherlands) Johnny Rep
- (Nigeria) Alloysius Atuegbu
- (Nigeria) Godwin Iwelumo
- (Northern Ireland) Gerry Armstrong
- (Paraguay) Carlos Jara Saguier
- (Peru) Teófilo Cubillas
- (Poland) Andrzej Szarmach
- (Poland) Włodzimierz Lubański
- (Poland) Stanisław Terlecki
- (Portugal) Fernando Chalana
- (Portugal) Nené
- (Romania) Dudu Georgescu
- (Romania) Anghel Iordănescu
- (Scotland) Kenny Dalglish
- (Sierra Leone) Kama Dumbuya
- (Sierra Leone) Wasieu Sounomu
- (Singapore) Quah Kim Song
- (Suriname) Edwin Schal
- (Soviet Union) David Kipiani
- (South Korea) Choi Jong-duk
- (South Korea) Kim Jae-han
- (South Korea) Lee Young-moo
- (Spain) Rubén Cano
- (Sweden) Bo Börjesson
- (Thailand) Vidthaya Laohakul
- (Thailand) Niwat Srisawat
- (Trinidad and Tobago) Sammy Llewellyn
- (Tunisia) Abderraouf Ben Aziza
- (Tunisia) Khemais Labidi
- (Turkey) Sedat Özden
- (Uruguay) Dario Pereyra
- (Uruguay) Nitder Pizzani
- (Republic of Upper Volta) Joseph Kaboré
- (Wales) Leighton James
- (Zambia) Bernard Chanda
- (Zambia) Godfrey Chitalu
- (Zambia) Willie Phiri

1 goal

- (Algeria) Omar Betrouni
- (Algeria) Mahmoud Guendouz
- (Australia) Murray Barnes
- (Australia) Colin Bennett
- (Austria) Roland Hattenberger
- (Austria) Wilhelm Kreuz
- (Austria) Hans Pirkner
- (Austria) Herbert Prohaska
- (Austria) Walter Schachner
- (Bahrain) Ibrahim Al Farhan
- (Bahrain) Ebrahim Zowayed
- (Belgium) Paul Courant
- (Belgium) Maurice Martens
- (Belgium) Gilbert Van Binst
- (Belgium) François Van der Elst
- (Belgium) Roger Van Gool
- (Bolivia) Ovidio Messa
- (Brazil) Toninho Cerezo
- (Brazil) Marcelo Oliveira
- (Brazil) Rivellino
- (Bulgaria) Hristo Bonev
- (Bulgaria) Chavdar Tsvetkov
- (Bulgaria) Andrey Zhelyazkov
- (Cameroon) Jean Manga Onguéné
- (Chile) Sergio Ahumada
- (Chile) Osvaldo Castro
- (Chile) Miguel Ángel Gamboa
- (Colombia) Eduardo Vilarete
- (Republic of the Congo) Jonas Bahamboula
- (Republic of the Congo) Daniel Ebomoa
- (Republic of the Congo) Pierre Lingongo
- (Republic of the Congo) Joseph Mounoudzi
- (Republic of the Congo) Joseph Wamba
- (Costa Rica) Mario Barrantes
- (Costa Rica) Javier Masís
- (Costa Rica) William Fisher Salgado
- (Ivory Coast) Gaston Bawa
- (Ivory Coast) Lucien Kouassi Kouame
- (Ivory Coast) Pascal Miézan
- (Cuba) Dagoberto Lara
- (Cuba) Ramón Núñez
- (Cuba) Agustín Pérez Castillo
- (Cuba) Miguel Rivero
- (Cuba) Andrés Roldán
- (Cyprus) Takis Antoniou
- (Cyprus) Stefanis Michael
- (Cyprus) Stavros Stylianou
- (Czechoslovakia) Miroslav Gajdůšek
- (Czechoslovakia) Zdeněk Nehoda
- (Czechoslovakia) Antonín Panenka
- (Czechoslovakia) Ladislav Petráš
- (Denmark) Allan Hansen
- (Denmark) Jørgen Kristensen
- (Denmark) Benny Nielsen
- (Denmark) Kristen Nygaard
- (Denmark) Ole Rasmussen
- (Denmark) Niels Tune-Hansen
- (East Germany) Peter Kotte
- (East Germany) Wolfram Löwe
- (East Germany) Jürgen Sparwasser
- (East Germany) Gert Weber
- (Ecuador) José Fabián Paz y Miño
- (Egypt) Ahmed Abdel Baki
- (Egypt) Maher Hammam
- (Egypt) Ossama Khalil
- (Egypt) Mokhtar Mokhtar
- (El Salvador) Silvio Aquino
- (El Salvador) Mágico González
- (England) Trevor Brooking
- (England) Trevor Francis
- (England) Paul Mariner
- (England) Stuart Pearson
- (England) Joe Royle
- (England) Dennis Tueart
- (Ethiopia) Tekalinge Kassahun
- (Finland) Kai Haaskivi
- (Finland) Teppo Heikkinen
- (Finland) Ari Mäkynen
- (Finland) Jyrki Nieminen
- (Finland) Matti Paatelainen
- (France) Dominique Bathenay
- (France) Christian Dalger
- (France) Bernard Lacombe
- (France) Dominique Rocheteau
- (Ghana) Opoku Afriyle
- (Ghana) Ofei Ansah
- (Ghana) Ibrahim Kassum
- (Guatemala) Julio César Anderson
- (Guatemala) Leonardo McNish
- (Guatemala) Benjamin Monterroso
- (Guinea) Ousmane Badara Bangoura
- (Guinea) Youssuf Camara
- (Guinea) Mamadou Aliou Keita
- (Guinea) Chérif Souleymane
- (Guinea) Ali Sylla
- (Guinea) Ismael Sylla
- (Guinea) Seydouba Sylla
- (Guinea) Ousmane Thiam Tollo
- (Guyana) Vibert Butts
- (Guyana) Keith Niles
- (Haiti) Guy Dorsainville
- (Haiti) Ernst Jean-Baptiste
- (Haiti) Carlo Brevil
- (Haiti) Jean-Claude Désir
- (Haiti) Louidor Labissiere
- (Hong Kong) Chan Fat Chi
- (Hong Kong) Fung Chi Ming
- (Hong Kong) Tang Hung Cheong
- (Hungary) László Fazekas
- (Hungary) István Halász
- (Hungary) László Nagy
- (Hungary) Sándor Pintér
- (Hungary) László Pusztai
- (Hungary) Béla Várady
- (Hungary) Sándor Zombori
- (Iceland) Ingi Björn Albertsson
- (Iceland) Ásgeir Sigurvinsson
- (Indonesia) Junaedi Abdillah
- (Indonesia) Anjas Asmara
- (Indonesia) Iswadi Idris
- (Indonesia) Andi Lala
- (Indonesia) Ronny Pattinasarany
- (Indonesia) Risdianto
- (Indonesia) Waskito
- (Iran) Behtash Fariba
- (Iran) Habib Khabiri
- (Iran) Ali Parvin
- (Iran) Habib Shareefi
- (Iran) Mohsin Yousifi
- (Republic of Ireland) Liam Brady
- (Republic of Ireland) Don Givens
- (Israel) Haim Bar
- (Israel) Uri Malmilian
- (Israel) Itzhak Peretz
- (Italy) Romeo Benetti
- (Italy) Franco Causio
- (Italy) Claudio Gentile
- (Italy) Renato Zaccarelli
- (Jamaica) Carl Brown
- (Kuwait) Ibrahim Mohammed Al Duraihem
- (Kuwait) Farouk Ibrahim Al Awadi Al Saleh
- (Kuwait) Badr Abdul Hameed Bo Abbas
- (Kuwait) Abdullah Yousuf Ma'yoof
- (Luxembourg) Nico Braun
- (Luxembourg) Gilbert Zender
- (Malaysia) Bakri Ibni
- (Mauritania) Gagny Coulibaly
- (Morocco) Abdelghani Lakhal
- (Morocco) Mustapha Tahir
- (Mexico) Pedro Damián Álvarez
- (Mexico) Arturo Vázquez Ayala
- (Mexico) Chepe Chávez
- (Mexico) Hugo Dávila
- (Mexico) Francisco Solís Cruz
- (Netherlands) Ruud Krol
- (Netherlands) Willem van Hanegem
- (Netherlands) René van de Kerkhof
- (Netherlands) Willy van de Kerkhof
- (Netherlands Antilles) Monico Eluterio Ruiz
- (Niger) Boukari Adamou
- (Niger) Moussa Kanfideni
- (Niger) Sanda Seydou
- (Nigeria) Adokie Amiesimaka
- (Nigeria) Kunle Awesu
- (Nigeria) Christian Chukwu
- (Nigeria) Kelechi Emeteole
- (Nigeria) Johnny N'Wadioha
- (Nigeria) Samuel Ojebode
- (Northern Ireland) Sammy McIlroy
- (Northern Ireland) Derek Spence
- (Norway) Odd Iversen
- (Norway) Tom Lund
- (Norway) Rune Ottesen
- (New Zealand) Clive Campbell
- (New Zealand) Dave Taylor
- (New Zealand) Kevin Weymouth
- (Panama) Hector Nestor Hernández
- (Panama) Daniel Montillo Ruíz
- (Panama) Federico Ponce
- (Panama) Agustín Sánchez
- (Panama) Luis Ernesto Tapia
- (Panama) Virgílio Vázquez
- (Paraguay) Carlos José Báez
- (Peru) Alejandro Luces
- (Peru) Juan José Muñante
- (Peru) Percy Rojas
- (Peru) Hugo Sotil
- (Poland) Zbigniew Boniek
- (Poland) Bohdan Masztaler
- (Poland) Włodzimierz Mazur
- (Portugal) Rui Jordão
- (Portugal) Octávio Machado
- (Portugal) Seninho
- (Portugal) Francisco Vital
- (Qatar) Anbar Bashir Abubakr
- (Qatar) Hassan Myuter Saied Al Suwaidi
- (Qatar) Mansour Muftah Faraj Bekhit
- (Romania) László Bölöni
- (Romania) Iosif Vigu
- (Saudi Arabia) Samir Sultan Al Fahad
- (Saudi Arabia) Saoud Al Gassem Mohammed Bo Saeed
- (Saudi Arabia) Mohammed Abdul Ghani
- (Scotland) Asa Hartford
- (Scotland) Joe Jordan
- (Scotland) Don Masson
- (Singapore) Mohammed Noh Hussein
- (Singapore) Dollah Kassim
- (Singapore) Suriamurthy Rajagopal
- (Senegal) Abdoulaye Ba
- (Sierra Leone) Ismail Dyfan
- (Sierra Leone) Mohammed Sama
- (Sierra Leone) William Sango
- (Sierra Leone) Samuel Tray
- (Soviet Union) Leonid Burjak
- (Soviet Union) Anatoliy Konkov
- (South Korea) Huh Jung-moo
- (South Korea) Kim Ho-kon
- (Spain) Eugenio Leal
- (Spain) Pirri
- (Suriname) Delano Rigters
- (Suriname) Errol Emanuelson
- (Suriname) Rinaldo Entingh
- (Suriname) Henry Playfair
- (Sweden) Björn Andersson
- (Switzerland) Peter Risi
- (Switzerland) Claudio Sulser
- (Switzerland) Serge Trinchero
- (Syria) Abdul Hamid Al Katbi
- (Syria) Marwan Khalifa Khouri
- (Taiwan) Chang Kuo Chi
- (Thailand) Cherdsak Chaiyabutr
- (Togo) Anani Afanou
- (Togo) Tabania Ametepé
- (Togo) Alirou Rachidou
- (Trinidad and Tobago) Leon Carpette
- (Trinidad and Tobago) Anthony Douglas
- (Trinidad and Tobago) Selris Figaro
- (Tunisia) Tarak Dhiab
- (Tunisia) Amor Jebali
- (Tunisia) Néjib Liman
- (Tunisia) Ali Kaabi
- (Tunisia) Moncef Khouini
- (Turkey) Mehmet Özgül
- (Turkey) Volkan Yayim
- (Uganda) Abdulla Nasur
- (Uganda) Denis Obua
- (Uganda) Polly Ouma
- (Uruguay) Washington Oliveira
- (Republic of Upper Volta) Joseph Ouattara
- (Republic of Upper Volta) Kouligo Zoma
- (United States) Boris Bandov
- (United States) Miro Rys
- (United States) Juli Veee
- (Wales) Nick Deacy
- (Venezuela) Vicente Flores
- (Venezuela) Rafael Iriarte
- (Socialist Federal Republic of Yugoslavia) Zoran Filipović
- (Socialist Federal Republic of Yugoslavia) Dražen Mužinić
- (Socialist Federal Republic of Yugoslavia) Aleksandar Trifunović
- (Zambia) Alex Chola
- (Zambia) Obby Kapita

1 own goal

- (Barbados) Victor Clarke (against Trinidad and Tobago)
- (Bolivia) Windsor del Llano (playing against Hungary)
- (Guatemala) Allan Wellmann (against Panama)
- (Hungary) László Bálint (playing against the Soviet Union)
- (Malawi) Jack Chamangwana (playing against Zambia)
- (Nigeria) Godwin Odiye (playing against Tunisia)
- (Paraguay) José Domingo Insfrán (playing against Brazil)
- (Spain) Gregorio Benito (playing against Romania)
- (Taiwan) Lo Chih Tsong (playing against New Zealand)
- (Wales) Ian Evans (playing against Scotland)

== Notes ==
- For the first time, over 100 teams entered qualification for the World Cup.
- Statistically, this was the most difficult World Cup to qualify for. Taking the two automatic places into account, and excluding twelve teams who withdrew before playing, 95 teams competed for the remaining 14 places (14.7%). The number of spots was increased to 24 for the next World Cup.
- Tunisia's victory over Morocco on penalties was the first penalty shoot-out in World Cup qualification matches.
