= 1977 CONCACAF Championship squads =

These are the squads for the countries that played in the 1977 CONCACAF Championship.

The age listed for each player is on 8 October 1977, the first day of the tournament. The numbers of caps and goals listed for each player do not include any matches played after the start of the tournament. The club listed is the club for which the player last played a competitive match before the tournament. The nationality for each club reflects the national association (not the league) to which the club is affiliated. A flag is included for coaches who are of a different nationality than their own national team.

For the first time, more than half of the countries had players representing foreign clubs with Canada (10), El Salvador (2), Guatemala (1) and Haiti (3).

== Canada ==
Head coach: (West Germany) Eckhard Krautzun

No.	Pos.	Player	Date of birth (age)	Caps	Club
1	GK	Željko Bilecki	28 April 1950 (aged 27)		(Canada) Toronto Metros-Croatia
2	DF	Robert Iarusci	8 November 1954 (aged 22)		(United States) New York Cosmos
3	DF	Bruce Wilson	20 June 1951 (aged 26)		(Canada) Vancouver Whitecaps
4	MF	Bruce Twamley	23 May 1952 (aged 25)		(United States) Minnesota Kicks
5	DF	Bob Lenarduzzi	1 May 1955 (aged 22)		(Canada) Vancouver Whitecaps
6	DF	Sam Lenarduzzi	19 December 1949 (aged 27)		(Canada) Vancouver Whitecaps
7	FW	Victor Kodelja	26 November 1951 (aged 25)		(United States) Team Hawaii
8	MF	Gene Strenicer	12 August 1945 (aged 32)		(Canada) Toronto Metros-Croatia
9	MF	Buzz Parsons	16 December 1950 (aged 26)		(Canada) Vancouver Whitecaps
10	MF	Bob Bolitho	20 July 1955 (aged 22)		(Canada) Vancouver Whitecaps
11	FW	Ike MacKay	2 August 1948 (aged 29)		(United States) Portland Timbers
12	FW	Wes McLeod	24 October 1957 (aged 19)		(United States) Tampa Bay Rowdies
14	DF	John McGrane	24 October 1957 (aged 19)		(United States) Los Angeles Aztecs
15	FW	Brian Budd	8 April 1952 (aged 25)		(Canada) Vancouver Whitecaps
16	DF	Peter Roe	23 September 1955 (aged 22)		(Canada) Toronto Metros-Croatia
17	DF	Brian Gant	23 April 1952 (aged 25)		(United States) Portland Timbers
18	MF	Brian Robinson	29 June 1948 (aged 29)		(Canada) Vancouver Whitecaps
19	DF	Garry Ayre	12 October 1953 (aged 23)		(Canada) Vancouver Whitecaps
20	FW	Gary Thompson	9 August 1945 (aged 32)		(Canada) Vancouver Whitecaps
21	MF	Mike Bakić	30 December 1952 (aged 24)		(United States) Rochester Lancers
22	GK	Tony Chursky	13 June 1953 (aged 24)		(United States) Seattle Sounders
23	GK	Tino Lettieri	27 September 1957 (aged 20)		(United States) Minnesota Kicks

== El Salvador ==
Head coach: (Uruguay) Juan Ricardo Faccio

No.	Pos.	Player	Date of birth (age)	Caps	Club
1	GK	Albert Fay	28 January 1949 (aged 28)		(Uruguay) Peñarol
2	DF	Francisco Jovel	26 May 1951 (aged 26)		(El Salvador) Luis Ángel Firpo
3	DF	Billy Bou	31 August 1950 (aged 27)		(El Salvador) FAS
4	DF	Héctor Piccioni	17 January 1945 (aged 32)		(El Salvador) FAS
5	DF	Carlos Recinos	30 June 1950 (aged 27)	0	(El Salvador) FAS
6	DF	Ramón Fagoaga	12 January 1952 (aged 25)	0	(El Salvador) Atlético Marte
7	DF	Luis Felipe Romero	12 June 1951 (aged 26)	0	(El Salvador) Atlético Marte
8	DF	Jorge Alberto Peña	13 September 1946 (aged 31)	0	(El Salvador) Atlético Marte
9	FW	David Cabrera	12 September 1945 (aged 32)		(El Salvador) FAS
10	MF	Norberto Huezo	6 June 1956 (aged 21)		(El Salvador) Atlético Marte
11	GK	Jorge Suárez	17 April 1945 (aged 32)		(El Salvador) Once Municipal
12	MF	Alfredo Rivera	22 October 1952 (aged 24)		(El Salvador) Atlético Marte
13	MF	Eduardo Valdez	30 April 1951 (aged 26)		(El Salvador) FAS
14	MF	Juan Quinteros	20 March 1947 (aged 30)		(El Salvador) Juventud Olímpica
15	FW	Luis Ramírez Zapata	6 January 1954 (aged 23)		(Costa Rica) Cartaginés
16	DF	Wilfredo Peñate	27 May 1955 (aged 22)		Universidad de El Salvador
17	MF	Víctor Valencia	22 December 1949 (aged 27)		(El Salvador) Sonsonate
18	FW	Mágico González	13 March 1958 (aged 19)		(El Salvador) Independiente
19	FW	Elmer Rosas	29 July 1949 (aged 28)		(El Salvador) Juventud Olímpica
20	GK	Mauricio Humberto Castillo	18 April 1955 (aged 22)		(El Salvador) Alianza
21	MF	Silvio Aquino	30 June 1949 (aged 28)	?	(El Salvador) Juventud Olímpica
22	FW	Werner Solís	20 September 1949 (aged 28)	?	(El Salvador) Juventud Olímpica

== Guatemala ==
Head Coach: Carlos Wellman

No.	Pos.	Player	Date of birth (age)	Caps	Club
1	GK	Ricardo Piccinini	7 September 1949 (aged 28)		(Guatemala) Comunicaciones
2	GK	Julio Rodolfo García	23 November 1945 (aged 31)		(Guatemala) Municipal
3	GK	Oscar Cordero			(Guatemala) Galcasa
4	DF	Julio Gómez	28 October 1954 (aged 22)		(Guatemala) Aurora
5	DF	Carlos Pérez McNish			(Guatemala) Galcasa
6	MF	Luis Alberto Valle			(Guatemala) Aurora
7	MF	Oswaldo Morales Pinzón			(Guatemala) Galcasa
8	DF	Julio Roberto Gil			(Guatemala) Tipografía Nacional
9	DF	Allan Wellman	26 May 1954 (aged 23)		(Guatemala) Comunicaciones
10	DF	Sergio Rivera	28 November 1955 (aged 21)		(Guatemala) Municipal
11	MF	Juan Pérez Monge	1957 (aged 20)		(Guatemala) Comunicaciones
12	MF	Benjamín Monterroso	1 January 1952 (aged 25)		(Guatemala) Municipal
13	MF	Edgar Bolaños	20 February 1951 (aged 26)		(Guatemala) Comunicaciones
14	MF	Mario Alfaro			(Guatemala) Juventud Retalteca
15	MF	Eduardo Salguero			(Guatemala) Cobán Imperial
16	FW	Oscar Sánchez	15 July 1955 (aged 22)		(Guatemala) Municipal
17	MF	Edgar Toledo			(Guatemala) Comunicaciones
18	FW	Edgar Hernán González	1 February 1948 (aged 29)		(Guatemala) Comunicaciones
19	FW	Julio César Anderson	27 November 1947 (aged 29)		(Mexico) Atlético Potosino
20	FW	José Emilio Mitrovich	8 July 1947 (aged 30)		(Guatemala) Municipal
21	FW	Juan Rozzoto	16 January 1951 (aged 26)		(Guatemala) Municipal
22	FW	Felix McDonald	26 June 1954 (aged 23)		(Guatemala) Comunicaciones

== Haiti ==
Head coach: (West Germany) Sepp Piontek

No.	Pos.	Player	Date of birth (age)	Caps	Club
1	GK	Wilner Piquant	12 October 1949 (aged 27)		(Haiti) Aigle Noir
2	DF	Joseph-Marion Leandré	9 May 1945 (aged 32)	1	(Haiti) Racing Haïtien
3	MF	Ernst Jean-Joseph	11 June 1948 (aged 29)		(Haiti) Violette
4	MF	Frantz Mathieu	23 December 1952 (aged 24)		(Haiti) Violette
5	DF	Wilner Nazaire (captain)	30 March 1950 (aged 27)		(France) Fontainebleau
6	MF	Louidor Labissiere			(Haiti) Aigle Noir
7	FW	Roger Saint-Vil	8 December 1949 (aged 27)		(Haiti) Violette
8	MF	Jean-Claude Désir	8 August 1946 (aged 31)		(Haiti) Aigle Noir
9	MF	Philippe Vorbe	14 September 1947 (aged 30)		(Haiti) Violette
10	FW	Emmanuel Sanon	25 June 1951 (aged 26)		(Belgium) Beerschot
11	MF	Guy Dorsainville			(Haiti) Racing Haïtien
12	MF	Gerald Romulus			(Haiti) Racing Haïtien
13	MF	Ernst Jean-Baptiste	18 April 1956 (aged 21)		(Haiti) Violette
14	MF	Eddy Antoine	27 August 1949 (aged 28)	1	(Haiti) Racing Haïtien
15	FW	Leintz Domingue	11 January 1945 (aged 32)		(Haiti) Racing Haïtien
16	DF	Pierre Bayonne	11 June 1949 (aged 28)		(Haiti) Violette
17	DF	Arsène Auguste	3 February 1951 (aged 26)	1	(United States) Tampa Bay Rowdies
18	FW	Josue Constant			(Haiti) Violette
19	DF	Daniel Cadet	4 January 1960 (aged 17)		(Haiti) Violette
20	FW	Charles Borbe			(Haiti) Violette
21	GK	Paul Maxi			(Haiti) Violette
22	GK	Henri Françillon	26 May 1946 (aged 31)		(Haiti) Victory

== Mexico ==
Head coach: José Antonio Roca

No.	Pos.	Player	Date of birth (age)	Caps	Club
1	GK	José Pilar Reyes	12 October 1955 (aged 21)	9	(Mexico) Tigres UANL
2	GK	Francisco Castrejón	11 June 1947 (aged 30)	13	(Mexico) América
3	DF	Arturo Vázquez Ayala	26 June 1949 (aged 28)		(Mexico) Pumas UNAM
4	DF	René Trujillo	4 September 1947 (aged 30)		(Mexico) América
5	DF	Javier Guzmán (captain)	9 January 1945 (aged 32)	9	(Mexico) Cruz Azul
6	DF	Manuel Nájera	20 December 1952 (aged 24)		(Mexico) Leones Negros
7	DF	Eduardo Ramos	8 November 1949 (aged 27)	36	(Mexico) Toluca
8	DF	Alfredo Tena	21 November 1956 (aged 20)	5	(Mexico) América
9	DF	Carlos Gómez	16 August 1952 (aged 25)	5	(Mexico) León
10	MF	Antonio de la Torre	21 September 1951 (aged 26)		(Mexico) América
11	MF	José Luis Real	6 June 1952 (aged 25)		(Mexico) Guadalajara
12	MF	Manuel Guillén	31 December 1954 (aged 22)		(Mexico) Leones Negros
13	MF	Francisco Solís Cruz	4 December 1952 (aged 24)		(Mexico) Monterrey
14	MF	Chepe Chávez	4 August 1952 (aged 25)		(Mexico) Leones Negros
15	MF	Javier Cárdenas	8 December 1952 (aged 24)		(Mexico) Toluca
16	FW	Raúl Isiordia	22 December 1952 (aged 24)	8	(Mexico) Atlético Español
17	FW	Cristóbal Ortega	25 July 1956 (aged 21)	9	(Mexico) América
18	FW	José de Jesús Aceves	3 February 1953 (aged 24)	9	(Mexico) América
19	FW	Alacrán Jiménez	5 September 1951 (aged 26)		(Mexico) Cruz Azul
20	FW	Víctor Rangel	11 March 1957 (aged 20)		(Mexico) Guadalajara
21	FW	Leonardo Cuéllar	14 January 1952 (aged 25)		(Mexico) Pumas UNAM
22	FW	Hugo Sánchez	11 July 1958 (aged 19)		(Mexico) Pumas UNAM

== Suriname ==
Head coach: Walther Braithwaite

No.	Pos.	Player	Date of birth (age)	Caps	Club
1	GK	Edmund Leilis	17 April 1950 (aged 27)		(Suriname) Robinhood
2	DF	Roy Vanenburg	18 December 1948 (aged 28)		(Suriname) Transvaal
3	DF	Siegfried Brondenstein			(Suriname) Robinhood
4	DF	Wilfred Garden			(Suriname) Robinhood
5	DF	Remie Olmberg	28 August 1950 (aged 27)		(Suriname) Robinhood
6	MF	Roy George	15 April 1953 (aged 24)		(Suriname) Robinhood
7	MF	Delano Rigters	31 December 1956 (aged 20)		(Suriname) SNL
8	MF	Frits Purperhart	25 December 1944 (aged 32)		(Suriname) Robinhood
9	FW	Errol Emanuelson	16 April 1953 (aged 24)		(Suriname) Robinhood
10	MF	Rinaldo Entingh	9 June 1954 (aged 23)		(Suriname) Robinhood
11	FW	Edwin Schal	3 October 1943 (aged 34)		(Suriname) Transvaal
12	MF	John Castillon			(Suriname) Robinhood
13	GK	Roy Belfor			(Suriname) Voorwaarts
14	DF	Ewal Leefland			(Suriname) SNL
15	MF	Franklin Borgia			(Suriname) Leo Victory
16	MF	Harold Fosters			(Suriname) Voorwaarts
17	MF	Paul Corte	22 January 1951 (aged 26)		(Suriname) Transvaal
18	MF	Arnold Zebeda	26 April 1946 (aged 31)		(Suriname) Robinhood
20	MF	Siegfried Rustenberg			(Suriname) Voorwaarts
22	GK	Errol de Mees	16 August 1950 (aged 27)		(Suriname) Robinhood
