= 1977 CONCACAF Championship qualification =

Tournament details
- Dates: 2 April – 29 December 1976
- Teams: 16 (from 1 confederation)

Tournament statistics
- Matches played: 36
- Goals scored: 103 (2.86 per match)

The 1977 CONCACAF Championship qualification competition was the qualifying contest to decide the finalists for the 1977 CONCACAF Championship – the seventh international association football championship for members of the Confederation of North, Central America and Caribbean Association Football (CONCACAF). Qualifying ran from 2 April – 29 December 1976 and was contested by the national teams of 16 CONCACAF member associations. The competition doubled as the qualification competition for the 1978 FIFA World Cup.

As with the previous edition, no teams qualified automatically. The qualifying competition was split into three zones – a Caribbean zone, a Central American zone and a North American zone. Two teams from each zone – Suriname and Haiti from the Caribbean zone, Guatemala and El Salvador from the Central American zone and Mexico and Canada from the North American zone – qualified for the final tournament.

== Background ==
The Confederation of North, Central America and Caribbean Association Football (CONCACAF) was founded as a merger of the Confederación Centroamericana y del Caribe de Fútbol (CCCF) and North American Football Confederation (NAFC) in 1961. The first CONCACAF Championship, in which all the competing nations qualified automatically, was held in 1963. A qualifying competition was introduced from the second edition in 1965. From 1973, the competition doubled as the qualifying competition for the FIFA World Cup for teams in North, Central America and the Caribbean. Only the winner of each edition would qualify for the World Cup.

== Format ==
Qualification for the 1977 CONCACAF Championship was split into a Caribbean zone, a Central American zone and a North American zone.

In the Caribbean zone, the nine teams were split into a group of four teams and a group of five teams. A preliminary round was held for the group of five teams in which two of the teams would contest a two-legged tie. The team scoring more goals on aggregate would advance to the first round. For both groups, the four teams were drawn into two two-legged ties in which the team scoring more goals on aggregate in each tie would advance to the second round. The two remaining teams in each group would contest a final two-legged tie in which the team scoring more goals on aggregate would qualify for the final tournament.

In both the North and Central American zones, the competing teams would contest a double round-robin where each team would play all of the others twice. The winners and runners-up from both sections would qualify for the final tournament.

=== Participants ===
Caribbean zone:

- Barbados
- Cuba
- Dominican Republic
- Guyana
- Haiti
- Jamaica
- Netherlands Antilles
- Suriname
- Trinidad and Tobago

Central American zone:

- Costa Rica
- El Salvador
- Guatemala
- Panama

North American zone:

- Canada
- Mexico
- United States

== North American zone ==
The North American zone began on 24 September when Canada and the United States drew 1–1. On 3 October, the United States and Mexico played out a goalless draw. A week later, Canada defeated Mexico 1–0 to go top of the table. At the halfway stage, Canada led the group with three points, one ahead of the United States and two above Mexico.

On 15 October, Mexico defeated the United States 3–0 to lead frog them in the table. Five days later, the United States defeated Canada 2–0 to go top of the table by one point with one match left to play. The United States, who had played all their matches, would qualify for the final tournament unless Canada drew with Mexico. On 27 October, Mexico and Canada played out a goalless draw which meant all three teams finished level on four points. Mexico qualified for the final tournament on goal difference but Canada and the United States were also tied on goal difference and there was no other tiebreaker in use at the time. As a result, a play-off was held to decide the second team to qualify.

=== Table ===
Pos	Team	Pld	W	D	L	GF	GA	GD	Pts	Qualification
1	Mexico	4	1	2	1	3	1	+2	4	Qualification for 1977 CONCACAF Championship
2	Canada (O)	4	1	2	1	2	3	−1	4 (Note: A play-off match was organised as both teams were tied on points and goal difference.)	Play-off
2	United States	4	1	2	1	3	4	−1	4	Play-off

(O) Play-off winners

=== Results ===
24 September 1976

Canada	1–1	United States
Bolitho 77'		Bandov 8'

Empire Stadium, Vancouver
Attendance: 15,453
Referee: Dorantes García (Mexico)

3 October 1976

United States	0–0	Mexico

Los Angeles Memorial Coliseum, Los Angeles
Attendance: 33,171
Referee: Dante Maglio (Canada)

10 October 1976

Canada	1–0	Mexico
Parsons 32'

Empire Stadium, Vancouver
Attendance: 17,939
Referee: Toros Kibritjian (United States)

15 October 1976

Mexico	3–0	United States
Solís 28'; Álvarez 40'; Dávila 83' (pen.)

Estadio Cuauhtémoc, Puebla
Referee: Werner Winsemann (Canada)

20 October 1976

United States	2–0	Canada
Rys 55'; Veee 81'

Kingdome, Seattle
Attendance: 17,675
Referee: Rubio Vásquez (Mexico)

27 October 1976

Mexico	0–0	Canada

Estadio Nemesio Díez, Toluca
Referee: Landauer (United States)

=== Play-off ===
The play-off took place on 22 December at a neutral venue in Haiti. A trio of Bobs – Budd, Lenarduzzi and Bolitho – scored for Canada as they won 3–0 to qualify for the final tournament.

22 December 1976

Canada	3–0	United States
Budd 21'; Lenarduzzi 80'; Bolitho 87'

Stade Sylvio Cator, Port-au-Prince, Haiti
Attendance: c. 5,000
Referee: Velasquez Ramírez (Colombia)

== Central American zone ==
The Central American zone began on 4 April when Panama defeated Costa Rica 3–2. On 2 May, Panama drew 1–1 with El Salvador. On 11 July, Costa Rica defeated Panama 3–0. On 1 August, Luis Ramírez Zapata scored a hat-trick as El Salvador defeated Panama 4–1. Guatemala played their first match on 17 September when they defeated Panama 4–2. Nine days later, braces from Óscar Enrique Sánchez, Selvin Pennant and Felix McDonald helped Guatemala to a 7–0 win against Panama. With half the matches played, Guatemala were top of the group on four points, one ahead of El Salvador and Panama and two clear of Costa Rica. Panama, who had played all of their matches, were eliminated from the competition.

On 1 December, El Salvador and Costa Rica drew 1–1. Four days later, Costa Rica and Guatemala played out a goalless draw. On 8 December, Guatemala defeated El Salvador 3–1 to put themselves within a point of qualifying. Four days later, Guatemala drew 1–1 with Costa Rica to qualify for the final tournament. On 15 December, El Salvador and Costa Rica drew 1–1 which left Costa Rica second in the group, one point above El Salvador, with one match left to play. Four days later, El Salvador defeated Guatemala 2–0 to leapfrog Costa Rica and qualify for the final tournament.

=== Table ===
Pos	Team	Pld	W	D	L	GF	GA	GD	Pts	Qualification
1	Guatemala	6	3	2	1	15	6	+9	8	Qualification for 1977 CONCACAF Championship
2	El Salvador	6	2	3	1	10	7	+3	7	Qualification for 1977 CONCACAF Championship
3	Costa Rica	6	1	4	1	8	6	+2	6	
4	Panama	6	1	1	4	7	21	−14	3	

=== Results ===
4 April 1976

Panama	3–2	Costa Rica
Tapia 48'; Ponce 50'; Sánchez 75'		Jiménez 34'; Barrantes 85'

Estadio Rommel Fernández, Panama City
Referee: Cedillos (Honduras)

2 May 1976

Panama	1–1	El Salvador
Vázquez 50' (pen.)		Ramírez 16'

Estadio Rommel Fernández, Panama City
Referee: Rojas Luis (Costa Rica)

11 July 1976

Costa Rica	3–0	Panama
Alvarado 11', 22'; Jiménez 44'

Estadio Ricardo Saprissa Aymá, San Juan de Tibás
Referee: Sazo Alvarez (Nicaragua)

1 August 1976

El Salvador	4–1	Panama
Ramírez 7', 14', 78'; Aquino 69'		Hernández 88'

Estadio Cuscatlán, San Salvador
Referee: Rubio Vásquez (Mexico)

17 September 1976

Panama	2–4	Guatemala
Wellmann 9' (o.g.); Montillo 25'		Pennant 51'; Sánchez 56', 63'; Anderson 88'

Estadio Rommel Fernández, Panama City
Referee: Álvarez Morales (Costa Rica)

26 September 1976

Guatemala	7–0	Panama
Sánchez 14', 68'; Pennant 17', 40'; McDonald 53', 62'; Sandoval 70'

Estadio Doroteo Guamuch Flores, Guatemala City
Referee: Avendano Ruiz (El Salvador)

1 December 1976

El Salvador	1–1	Costa Rica
Cabrera 27'		Jiménez 78'

Estadio Cuscatlán, San Salvador
Referee: Méndez Molina (Guatemala)

5 December 1976

Costa Rica	0–0	Guatemala

Estadio Nacional de Costa Rica, San José
Referee: Archundia (Mexico)

8 December 1976

Guatemala	3–1	El Salvador
McNish 19'; Monterroso 30'; Sánchez 80'		Valencia 14' (pen.)

Estadio Doroteo Guamuch Flores, Guatemala City
Referee: Luis Paulino Siles Calderón (Costa Rica)

12 December 1976

Guatemala	1–1	Costa Rica
Sandoval 77'		Salgado 89'

Estadio Doroteo Guamuch Flores, Guatemala City
Referee: Andino Pinel (Honduras)

15 December 1976

Costa Rica	1–1	El Salvador
Figueroa 40'		Ramírez 75'

Estadio Nacional de Costa Rica, San José
Referee: Mollinedo (Guatemala)

19 December 1976

El Salvador	2–0	Guatemala
Cabrera 1'; Valencia 12'

Estadio Cuscatlán, San Salvador
Referee: Segura (Mexico)

== Caribbean zone ==
=== Group A ===
On 4 July, Guyana defeated Suriname 2–0 and, on 15 August, Barbados defeated Trinidad and Tobago 2–1 in the first round first legs. On 29 August, Suriname completed a comeback win in the tie after winning 3–0 against Guyana to advance 3–2 on aggregate. Two days later, Trinidad and Tobago defeated Barbados 1–0 to tie the aggregate score at 2–2. A play-off was set up to be played in Barbados on 14 September. Trinidad and Tobago won 3–1 to advance to the second round.

In the second round, Suriname and Trinidad and Tobago drew 1–1 in the first leg on 14 November. A fortnight later, they drew 2–2 as the tie finished 3–3 on aggregate. A play-off was set up to be played at a neutral venue in French Guiana on 18 December. Suriname defeated Trinidad and Tobago 3–2 after extra time to qualify for the final tournament.

Caribbean zone group A
Team 1	Agg.	Team 2	1st leg	2nd leg	Play-off
First round
Guyana	2–3	Suriname	2–0	0–3	
Barbados	2–2	Trinidad and Tobago	2–1	0–1	1–3
Second round
Suriname	3–3	Trinidad and Tobago	1–1	2–2	3–2 (a.e.t.)

==== First round ====
4 July 1976

Guyana	2–0	Suriname
Butts 9'; Niles 72'

Georgetown Cricket Club Ground, Georgetown
Referee: Gay (Trinidad and Tobago)
29 August 1976

Suriname	3–0	Guyana
Playfaire 4'; George 35', 53'

André Kamperveen Stadion, Paramaribo
Referee: Wooding (Trinidad and Tobago)

Suriname won 3–2 on aggregate.

15 August 1976

Barbados	2–1	Trinidad and Tobago
Clarke 47', 54' (pen.)		David 83'

Barbados National Stadium, Bridgetown
Referee: Steeman (Suriname)
31 August 1976

Trinidad and Tobago	1–0	Barbados
Douglas 36'

Queen's Park Oval, Port of Spain
Referee: Koetsier (Netherlands Antilles)

2–2 on aggregate.

===== Play-off =====
14 September 1976

Barbados	1–3	Trinidad and Tobago
Clarke 26'		Llewellyn 3'; Carpette 74'; Clarke 85' (o.g.)

Barbados National Stadium, Bridgetown
Referee: Calderón Castro (Cuba)

==== Second round ====
14 November 1976

Suriname	1–1	Trinidad and Tobago
George 2'		David 9'

André Kamperveen Stadion, Paramaribo
Referee: Chandler (Barbados)
28 November 1976

Trinidad and Tobago	2–2	Suriname
Figaro 29' (pen.); Llewellyn 64'		Olmberg 44': Entingh 83'

Queen's Park Oval, Port of Spain
Referee: Llobregat Vicedo (Venezuela)

3–3 on aggregate.

===== Play-off =====
18 December 1976

Suriname	3–2 (a.e.t.)	Trinidad and Tobago
George 60', 80'; Olmberg 107' (pen.)		David 19', 70'

Stade Georges-Chaumet, Cayenne, French Guiana
Referee: Llobregat Vicedo (Venezuela)

=== Group B ===
In the preliminary round first leg on 2 April, Haiti defeated the Dominican Republic 3–0. Pierre Bayonne scored a brace in the second leg as Haiti again won 3–0 against the Dominican Republic to advance 6–0 on aggregate.

On 31 July, Haiti defeated the Netherlands Antilles 2–1 in the first round first leg. A fortnight later, braces from Leintz Domingue and Emmanuel Sanon helped Haiti to a 7–0 win against the Netherlands Antilles in the second leg to advance 9–1 on aggregate. The following day, Cuba defeated Jamaica 3–1 in the first leg. On 29 August, Cuba defeated Jamaica 2–0 in the second leg to advance 5–1 on aggregate.

In the second round, Cuba and Haiti drew 1–1 in the first leg on 28 November. In the second leg on 11 December, they again drew 1–1 to leave the aggregate tied at 2–2. A play-off was organised at a neutral venue in Panama on 29 December which Haiti won 2–0 to qualify for the final tournament.

Caribbean zone group B
Team 1	Agg.	Team 2	1st leg	2nd leg	Play-off
Preliminary round
Dominican Republic	0–6	Haiti	0–3	0–3	
First round
Netherlands Antilles	1–9	Haiti	1–2	0–7	
Jamaica	1–5	Cuba	1–3	0–2	
Second round
Cuba	2–2	Haiti	1–1	1–1	0–2

==== Preliminary round ====
2 April 1976

Dominican Republic	0–3	Haiti
		Auguste 12'; Bayonne 29'; Baptiste 32'

Estadio Olímpico Félix Sánchez, Santo Domingo
Referee: Wuertz (United States)
17 April 1976

Haiti	3–0	Dominican Republic
Bayonne 32', 63'; Domingue 44'

Stade Sylvio Cator, Port-au-Prince
Referee: Villarejo Ramírez (Puerto Rico)

Haiti won 6–0 on aggregate.

==== First round ====
30 July 1976

Netherlands Antilles	1–2	Haiti
Ruiz 84'		Sanon 27', 39'

Estadio Guillermo Próspero Trinidad, Oranjestad
Referee: Chaplin (Jamaica)
14 August 1976

Haiti	7–0	Netherlands Antilles
Domingue 5', 41'; Sanon 27', 79'; Labissiere 30'; Brevil 50'; Bayonne 56'

Stade Sylvio Cator, Port-au-Prince
Referee: Montane Bosch (Puerto Rico)

Haiti won 9–1 on aggregate.

15 August 1976

Jamaica	1–3	Cuba
Brown 65'		Rivero 29'; Lara 50'; Fariñas 75'

Independence Park, Kingston
Referee: De la Puente (Dominican Republic)
29 August 1976

Cuba	2–0	Jamaica
Fariñas 42'; Pérez 77'

Estadio Pedro Marrero, Havana
Referee: Pastor (Dominican Republic)

Cuba won 5–1 on aggregate.

==== Second round ====
28 November 1976

Cuba	1–1	Haiti
Núñez 19'		Sanon 54'

Estadio Latinoamericano, Havana
Referee: Stewart (Jamaica)
11 December 1976

Haiti	1–1	Cuba
Sanon 81'		Roldán 79'

Stade Sylvio Cator, Port-au-Prince
Referee: Montane Bosch (Puerto Rico)

2–2 on aggregate.

===== Play-off =====
29 December 1976

Haiti	2–0	Cuba
Domingue 63'; Désir 83' (pen.)

Estadio Rommel Fernández, Panama City, Panama
Referee: Dorantes Garcia (Mexico)

== Goalscorers ==
There were 103 goals scored in 36 matches, for an average of 2.86 goals per match.

6 goals

- (Haiti) Emmanuel Sanon

5 goals

- (Guatemala) Óscar Enrique Sánchez
- (El Salvador) Luis Ramírez Zapata
- (Suriname) Roy George

4 goals

- (Haiti) Pierre Bayonne
- (Haiti) Leintz Domingue
- (Trinidad and Tobago) Steve David

3 goals

- (Barbados) Victor Clarke
- (Costa Rica) Javier Jiménez
- (Guatemala) Selvin Pennant

2 goals

- (Canada) Bob Bolitho
- (Costa Rica) Johnny Alvarado Cascante
- (Cuba) Francisco Fariñas
- (Guatemala) Felix McDonald
- (El Salvador) David Arnoldo Cabrera
- (El Salvador) Victor Manuel Mejia Valencia
- (Guatemala) Peter Sandoval
- (Suriname) Remie Olmberg
- (Trinidad and Tobago) Sammy Llewellyn

1 goal

- (Canada) Brian Budd
- (Canada) Bob Lenarduzzi
- (Canada) Buzz Parsons
- (Costa Rica) Mario Barrantes
- (Costa Rica) Javier Masís
- (Costa Rica) William Fisher Salgado
- (Cuba) Dagoberto Lara
- (Cuba) Ramón Núñez
- (Cuba) Agustín Pérez Castillo
- (Cuba) Miguel Rivero
- (Cuba) Andrés Roldán
- (El Salvador) Silvio Aquino
- (Guatemala) Julio César Anderson
- (Guatemala) Leonardo McNish
- (Guatemala) Benjamin Monterroso
- (Guyana) Vibert Butts
- (Guyana) Keith Niles
- (Haiti) Arsène Auguste
- (Haiti) Jean Marie Jean Baptiste
- (Haiti) Carlo Brevil
- (Haiti) Jean-Claude Désir
- (Haiti) Louidor Labissiere
- (Jamaica) Carl Brown
- (Mexico) Pedro Damián Álvarez
- (Mexico) Hugo Dávila
- (Mexico) Francisco Solís
- (Netherlands Antilles) Monico Eluterio Ruiz
- (Panama) Hector Nestor Hernández
- (Panama) Daniel Montillo Ruíz
- (Panama) Federico Ponce
- (Panama) Agustín Sánchez
- (Panama) Luis Ernesto Tapia
- (Panama) Virgílio Vázquez
- (Suriname) Rinaldo Entingh
- (Suriname) Henry Playfair
- (Trinidad and Tobago) Leon Carpette
- (Trinidad and Tobago) Anthony Douglas
- (Trinidad and Tobago) Selris Figaro
- (United States) Boris Bandov
- (United States) Miro Rys
- (United States) Juli Veee

1 own goal

- (Barbados) Victor Clarke (against Trinidad and Tobago)
- (Guatemala) Allan Wellmann (against Panama)
