= El Salvador national football team results (1970–1989) =

Results of the El Salvador national football team

This article provides details of international football games played by the El Salvador national football team from 1970 to 1989.

== 1970 ==
22 February 1970 Friendly	El Salvador	0–2	Soviet Union	San Salvador, El Salvador
			Puzach 32'; Serebryanikov 46'	Stadium: Estadio Nacional Flor Blanca; Attendance: 31,283

26 February 1970 Friendly	Costa Rica	2–0	El Salvador	San José, Costa Rica
	? (?); ? (?)			Stadium: Estadio Nacional

21 April 1970 Friendly	Peru	3–0	El Salvador	Lima, Peru
	? (?); ? (?); ? (?)			Stadium: Estadio Nacional

3 June 1970 1970 FIFA World Cup	Belgium	3–0	El Salvador	Mexico City, Mexico
16:00 UTC−6	Van Moer 12', 54'; Lambert 76' (pen.)	Report		Stadium: Estadio Azteca; Attendance: 92,205; Referee: Andrei Rădulescu (Romania)

7 June 1970 1970 FIFA World Cup	Mexico	4–0	El Salvador	Mexico City, Mexico
12:00 UTC−6	Valdivia 45', 46'; Fragoso 58'; Basaguren 83'	Report		Stadium: Estadio Azteca; Attendance: 103,058; Referee: Ali Kandil (United Arab Republic)

10 June 1970 1970 FIFA World Cup	Soviet Union	2–0	El Salvador	Mexico City, Mexico
16:00 UTC−6	Byshovets 51', 74'	Report		Stadium: Estadio Azteca; Attendance: 89,979; Referee: Rafael Hormazábal Díaz (Chile)

== 1971 ==
27 February 1971 Friendly	El Salvador	0–1	Soviet Union	San Salvador, El Salvador
			Osorio 30' (o.g.)	Stadium: Estadio Nacional Flor Blanca; Attendance: 32,000

13 September 1971 1971 CONCACAF Champ. Q.	El Salvador	3–2	Nicaragua	San Salvador, El Salvador
	Bucaro 26', 52'; Coreas 37'		? (?)	Stadium: Estadio Nacional Flor Blanca

15 September 1971 1971 CONCACAF Champ. Q.	El Salvador	1–0	Nicaragua	San Salvador, El Salvador
	Zapata 67'			Stadium: Estadio Nacional Flor Blanca

1971 1971 CONCACAF Champ. Q.	Honduras	(w/o)	El Salvador	Honduras
			Withdrew

== 1972 ==
1 October 1972 Friendly	Costa Rica	2–0	El Salvador	San José, Costa Rica
	? (?); ? (?)			Stadium: Estadio Nacional

8 October 1972 Friendly	Costa Rica	1–0	El Salvador	San José, Costa Rica
	? (?)			Stadium: Estadio Nacional

3 December 1972 1973 CONCACAF Champ. Q.	Guatemala	1–0	El Salvador	Guatemala City, Guatemala
	Melgar 89' (pen.)			Stadium: Estadio Doroteo Guamuch Flores; Referee: Pageotte (Haiti)

10 December 1972 1973 CONCACAF Champ. Q.	El Salvador	0–1	Guatemala	San Salvador, El Salvador
			Melgar 65'	Stadium: Estadio Nacional Flor Blanca; Referee: Kibritpan (United States)

== 1974 ==
26 January 1974 Friendly	Panama	1–1	El Salvador	Panama City, Panama
	? (?)		González 81'

== 1976 ==
9 February 1976 Friendly	El Salvador	1–2	Hungary	San Salvador, El Salvador
	Zapata 5'		? (?); ? (?)	Stadium: Estadio Nacional Flor Blanca

2 May 1976 1977 CONCACAF Champ. Q.	Panama	1–1	El Salvador	Panama City, Panama
	Vázquez 50' (pen.)		Ramírez 16'	Attendance: 7,345; Referee: Rojas Luis (Costa Rica)

7 July 1976 Friendly	Guatemala	1–0	El Salvador	Guatemala City, Guatemala
	? (?)			Stadium: Estadio Doroteo Guamuch Flores

1 August 1976 1977 CONCACAF Champ. Q.	El Salvador	4–1	Panama	San Salvador, El Salvador
	Ramírez 7', 14', 78'; Aquino 69'		Hernández 88'	Stadium: Estadio Cuscatlán; Attendance: 36,440; Referee: Rubio Vásquez (Mexico)

1 December 1976 1977 CONCACAF Champ. Q.	El Salvador	1–1	Costa Rica	San Salvador, El Salvador
	Cabrera 27'		Jiménez 78'	Stadium: Estadio Cuscatlán; Attendance: 45,866; Referee: Méndez Molina (Guatemala)

8 December 1976 1977 CONCACAF Champ. Q.	Guatemala	3–1	El Salvador	Guatemala City, Guatemala
	McNish 19'; Monterroso 30'; Sánchez 80'		Valencia 14' (pen.)	Stadium: Estadio Doroteo Guamuch Flores; Attendance: 30,535; Referee: Luis Paulino Siles Calderón (Costa Rica)

15 December 1976 1977 CONCACAF Champ. Q.	Costa Rica	1–1	El Salvador	San José, Costa Rica
	Masís 40'		Ramírez 75'	Stadium: Estadio Nacional; Attendance: 16,310; Referee: Mollinedo (Guatemala)

19 December 1976 1977 CONCACAF Champ. Q.	El Salvador	2–0	Guatemala	San Salvador, El Salvador
	Cabrera 1'; Valencia 12'			Stadium: Estadio Cuscatlán; Attendance: 35,399; Referee: Segura (Mexico)

== 1977 ==
15 September 1977 Friendly	El Salvador	1–2	United States	San Salvador, El Salvador
	Rosas 45'		? (?); ? (?)	Stadium: Estadio Cuscatlán; Attendance: 58,000

30 September 1977 Friendly	United States	0–0	El Salvador	United States
				Attendance: 15,000

8 October 1977 1977 CONCACAF Championship	Canada	1–2	El Salvador	Monterrey, Mexico
	Budd 85'		Ramírez 44', 84'	Stadium: Estadio Universitario; Attendance: 42,000; Referee: Pestarino (Argentina)

12 October 1977 1977 CONCACAF Championship	Mexico	3–1	El Salvador	Mexico City, Mexico
	Cárdenas 36'; Rangel 59', 90'		Huezo 75'	Stadium: Estadio Azteca; Attendance: 110,000; Referee: Toros Kibritjian (United States)

16 October 1977 1977 CONCACAF Championship	El Salvador	0–1	Haiti	Mexico City, Mexico
			Sanon 24'	Stadium: Estadio Azteca; Attendance: 53,978; Referee: Calderón Castro (Cuba)

20 October 1977 1977 CONCACAF Championship	El Salvador	3–2	Suriname	Monterrey, Mexico
	González 42'; Rosas 77', 87'		Emanuelson 58'; Olmberg 89' (pen.)	Stadium: Estadio Universitario; Attendance: 34,476; Referee: Crokwell (Bermuda)

23 October 1977 1977 CONCACAF Championship	Guatemala	2–2	El Salvador	Mexico City, Mexico
	Rivera 58', 75'		Rosas 44'; Huezo 85'	Stadium: Estadio Azteca; Attendance: 21,483; Referee: De la Puente (Dominican Republic)

== 1979 ==
4 December 1979 Friendly	El Salvador	0–2	Mexico	San Salvador, El Salvador
			? (?); ? (?)	Stadium: Estadio Cuscatlán; Referee: R. Reyes (El Salvador)

18 December 1979 Friendly	Mexico	1–1	El Salvador	Mexico City, Mexico
	? (?)		González 14'	Stadium: Estadio Azteca; Attendance: 14,000; Referee: M. Dorantes (Mexico)

== 1980 ==
9 May 1980 Friendly	Panama	0–0	El Salvador	Panama City, Panama
				Stadium: Estadio de la Revolución

15 May 1980 Friendly	Haiti	2–0	El Salvador	Port-au-Prince, Haiti
	? (?); ? (?)

4 June 1980 Friendly	El Salvador	3–0	Haiti	San Salvador, El Salvador
	Huezo 20'; González 22'; Escamilla 46'			Stadium: Estadio Cuscatlán

17 August 1980 Friendly	Guatemala	1–1	El Salvador	Guatemala City, Guatemala
	? (?)		González 44' (pen.)	Stadium: Estadio Mateo Flores

24 August 1980 1981 CONCACAF Champ. Q.	Panama	1–3	El Salvador	Panama City, Panama
	Paschal 19'		Rivas 16'; Huezo 75'; González 82'	Stadium: Estadio de la Revolución; Attendance: 3,547; Referee: Frederick Hoyte (Barbados)

30 September 1980 Friendly	El Salvador	3–2	Guatemala	San Salvador, El Salvador
	González 24', 52'; Ramírez 36'		? (?); ? (?)	Stadium: Estadio Cuscatlán

5 October 1980 1981 CONCACAF Champ. Q.	El Salvador	4–1	Panama	San Salvador, El Salvador
	González 2', 61', 77'; Rivas 35'		Montillo 27'	Stadium: Estadio Cuscatlán; Attendance: 33,005

26 October 1980 1981 CONCACAF Champ. Q.	El Salvador	2–0 (w/o)	Costa Rica	San Salvador, El Salvador
				Stadium: Estadio Cuscatlán; Referee: Domingo de la Mora (Mexico)

9 November 1980 1981 CONCACAF Champ. Q.	Guatemala	0–0	El Salvador	Guatemala City, Guatemala
				Stadium: Estadio Mateo Flores; Attendance: 42,453; Referee: David Socha (United States)

23 November 1980 1981 CONCACAF Champ. Q.	El Salvador	2–1	Honduras	San Salvador, El Salvador
	González 9'; Guerrero 66'		Figueroa 85'	Stadium: Estadio Cuscatlán; Attendance: 40,851; Referee: Fusco (Canada)

30 November 1980 1981 CONCACAF Champ. Q.	Honduras	2–0	El Salvador	Tegucigalpa, Honduras
	Bailey 23', 66'			Stadium: Estadio Tiburcio Carías Andino; Attendance: 38,979; Referee: Tony Evangelista (Canada)

10 December 1980 1981 CONCACAF Champ. Q.	Costa Rica	0–0	El Salvador	San José, Costa Rica
				Stadium: Estadio Ricardo Saprissa Aymá; Attendance: 3,284; Referee: Rubio Vásquez (Mexico)

21 December 1980 1981 CONCACAF Champ. Q.	El Salvador	1–0	Guatemala	San Salvador, El Salvador
	Huezo 49'			Stadium: Estadio Cuscatlán; Attendance: 22,813; Referee: D'Ippolito (United States)

== 1981 ==
11 June 1981 Friendly	Haiti	0–0	El Salvador	Port-au-Prince, Haiti

13 June 1981 Friendly	Haiti	0–0	El Salvador	Port-au-Prince, Haiti

26 July 1981 Friendly	El Salvador	4–0	Haiti	San Salvador, El Salvador
	Rivas 11'; González 43'; Huezo 82'; Aquíno 88'			Stadium: Estadio Cuscatlán

2 November 1981 1981 CONCACAF Championship	Canada	1–0	El Salvador	Tegucigalpa, Honduras
	Stojanović 90'			Stadium: Estadio Tiburcio Carías Andino; Attendance: 28,861; Referee: Pagano Trucios (Peru)

6 November 1981 1981 CONCACAF Championship	Mexico	0–1	El Salvador	Tegucigalpa, Honduras
			Hernández 81'	Stadium: Estadio Tiburcio Carías Andino; Attendance: 33,237; Referee: J. de J. Aragao (Brazil)

11 November 1981 1981 CONCACAF Championship	El Salvador	0–0	Cuba	Tegucigalpa, Honduras
				Stadium: Estadio Tiburcio Carías Andino; Attendance: 22,774; Referee: Socha (United States)

16 November 1981 1981 CONCACAF Championship	Honduras	0–0	El Salvador	Tegucigalpa, Honduras
				Stadium: Estadio Tiburcio Carías Andino; Attendance: 39,882; Referee: Luis Paulino Siles (Costa Rica)

19 November 1981 1981 CONCACAF Championship	Haiti	0–1	El Salvador	Tegucigalpa, Honduras
			Huezo 18' (pen.)	Stadium: Estadio Tiburcio Carías Andino; Attendance: 16,826; Referee: Downer (Trinidad and Tobago)

== 1982 ==
18 April 1982 Friendly	El Salvador	3–2	Honduras	San Salvador, El Salvador
	Huezo 11'; González 19', 89'		? (?); ? (?)	Stadium: Estadio Cuscatlán

22 April 1982 Friendly	Honduras	1–1	El Salvador	Tegucigalpa, Honduras
	? (?)		Rivas 13'	Stadium: Estadio Tiburcio Carías Andino

15 June 1982 1982 FIFA World Cup	Hungary	10–1	El Salvador	Elche, Spain
21:00 CEST	Nyialsi 4', 83'; Pölöskei 11'; Fazekas 23', 54'; Tóth 50'; Kiss 69', 72', 76'; Szentes 70'	Report	Ramírez 64'	Stadium: Nuevo Estadio; Attendance: 23,000; Referee: Ibrahim Youssef Al-Doy (Bahrain)

19 June 1982 1982 FIFA World Cup	Belgium	1–0	El Salvador	Elche, Spain
21:00 CEST	Coeck 19'	Report		Stadium: Nuevo Estadio; Attendance: 15,000; Referee: Malcolm Moffat (Northern Ireland)

23 June 1982 1982 FIFA World Cup	Argentina	2–0	El Salvador	Alicante, Spain
21:00 CEST	Passarella 22' (pen.); Bertoni 54'	Report		Stadium: Estadio José Rico Pérez; Attendance: 32,500; Referee: Luis Barrancos (Bolivia)

== 1983 ==
26 July 1983 Copa de Naciones	Guatemala	0–0 (3–4 p)	El Salvador	United States

25 October 1983 Friendly	Mexico	5–0	El Salvador	United States
	? (?); ? (?); ? (?); ? (?); ? (?)			Referee: H. Wolmerack (United States)

== 1984 ==
29 May 1984 Friendly	El Salvador	2–1	Panama	San Salvador, El Salvador
	Hernández 44'; Velasco 59' (pen.)		? (?)	Stadium: Estadio Cuscatlán

27 June 1984 Friendly	El Salvador	3–1	Guatemala	San Salvador, El Salvador
	Rivas 23'; Hernández 71'; Ramírez 87'		? (?)	Stadium: Estadio Cuscatlán

29 July 1984 1985 CONCACAF Champ. Q.	El Salvador	5–0	Puerto Rico	San Salvador, El Salvador
	Hernández 6', 19'; Rivas 28'; Alfaro 45'; Medrano 82'			Stadium: Estadio Cuscatlán; Attendance: 23,333; Referee: Rómulo Méndez (Guatemala)

5 August 1984 1985 CONCACAF Champ. Q.	Puerto Rico	0–3	El Salvador	San Juan, Puerto Rico
			Ramírez 1'; Rivas 12'; Alfaro 80'	Attendance: 1,500; Referee: Osborne (Bahamas)

9 October 1984 Columbus Cup	United States	3–1	El Salvador	United States
	? (?); ? (?); ? (?)		Rivas 56'	Attendance: 27,000

11 October 1984 Columbus Cup	Mexico	1–0	El Salvador	United States
	? (?)

4 December 1984 Friendly	Guatemala	1–2	El Salvador	United States
	? (?)		Hernández 23'; Rivas 50'

11 December 1984 Friendly	El Salvador	1–1	Ecuador	San Salvador, El Salvador
	Rivas 35'		? (?)	Stadium: Estadio Cuscatlán

23 December 1984 Friendly	Guatemala	2–0	El Salvador	Guatemala City, Guatemala
	? (?); ? (?)			Stadium: Estadio Mateo Flores

== 1985 ==
6 February 1985 Friendly	Costa Rica	2–1	El Salvador	San José, Costa Rica
	? (?); ? (?)		Hernández 56' (pen.)	Stadium: Estadio Ricardo Saprissa Aymá

13 February 1985 Friendly	El Salvador	1–0	Costa Rica	San Salvador, El Salvador
	? (?)			Stadium: Estadio Cuscatlán

24 February 1985 1985 CONCACAF Championship	Suriname	0–3	El Salvador	San Salvador, El Salvador
			Alfaro 33'; Hernández 60'; Huezo 68'	Stadium: Estadio Cuscatlán; Attendance: 35,652; Referee: Berny Ulloa Morera (Costa Rica)

27 February 1985 1985 CONCACAF Championship	El Salvador	3–0	Suriname	San Salvador, El Salvador
	Rivas 41', 87'; Ramírez 55'			Stadium: Estadio Cuscatlán; Attendance: 18,918; Referee: Mario Escobar López (Guatemala)

10 March 1985 1985 CONCACAF Championship	El Salvador	1–2	Honduras	San Salvador, El Salvador
	Rivas 63'		Bailey 1'; Laing 77'	Stadium: Estadio Cuscatlán; Attendance: 51,555; Referee: David Socha (United States)

14 March 1985 1985 CONCACAF Championship	Honduras	0–0	El Salvador	Tegucigalpa, Honduras
				Stadium: Estadio Tiburcio Carías Andino; Attendance: 38,175; Referee: Tony Evangelista (Canada)

== 1987 ==
30 September 1987 Friendly	El Salvador	2–1	Canada	San Salvador, El Salvador
	Canales 5'; Huezo 39' (pen.)		? (?)	Stadium: Estadio Cuscatlán; Attendance: 25,000

7 October 1987 Friendly	Guatemala	0–1	El Salvador	United States
			Rivas 86' (pen.)

== 1988 ==
18 April 1988 Friendly	Honduras	0–0	El Salvador	United States

10 April 1988 Friendly	El Salvador	0–0	Guatemala	San Salvador, El Salvador
				Stadium: Estadio Cuscatlán

21 April 1988 Friendly	Guatemala	1–1	El Salvador	United States
	? (?)		Cienfuegos (?)

5 August 1988 Copa Malboro	Guatemala	2–1	El Salvador	United States
	? (?); ? (?)		Coreas 5'

16 September 1988 Friendly	El Salvador	0–1	Paraguay	San Salvador, El Salvador
			? (?)	Stadium: Estadio Cuscatlán

25 September 1988 Friendly	Honduras	0–0	El Salvador	United States

1 October 1988 1989 CONCACAF Champ. Q.	Netherlands Antilles	0–1	El Salvador	Willemstad, Netherlands Antilles
			García 53'	Attendance: 3,311; Referee: Charles Branche (Trinidad and Tobago)

16 October 1988 1989 CONCACAF Champ. Q.	El Salvador	5–0	Netherlands Antilles	San Salvador, El Salvador
	Coreas 5'; García 35'; Francisca 62' (o.g.); Zapata 58', 68'			Stadium: Estadio Cuscatlán; Attendance: 40,000; Referee: Steve Bucknor (Jamaica)

9 November 1988 Friendly	Guatemala	0–0	El Salvador	United States

== 1989 ==
21 February 1989 1989 Amistad Cup	El Salvador	1–1 (a.e.t.) (4–3 p)	Costa Rica	Los Angeles, United States
	Coreas 88'		Coronado 49'	Stadium: Los Angeles Memorial Coliseum; Attendance: 33,600

23 February 1989 1989 Amistad Cup	Mexico	2–0	El Salvador	Los Angeles, United States
	Guzmán 24'; Farfán 69'			Stadium: Los Angeles Memorial Coliseum; Referee: Vincent Mauro (United States)

5 April 1989 Friendly	Guatemala	3–0	El Salvador	Guatemala City, Guatemala
	? (?); ? (?); ? (?)			Stadium: Estadio Mateo Flores

5 May 1989 4 Nations	Paraguay	2–1	El Salvador	United States
	? (?); ? (?)		Rivas 73'

7 May 1989 4 Nations	Chile	1–0	El Salvador	United States
	? (?)

25 June 1989 1989 CONCACAF Championship	El Salvador	2–4	Costa Rica	San Salvador, El Salvador
	Rodríguez 24'; Rivas 63'		Cayasso 16'; Hidalgo 46'; Flores 51', 75'	Stadium: Estadio Cuscatlán; Attendance: 40,000; Referee: Arturo Brizio Carter (Mexico)

16 July 1989 1989 CONCACAF Championship	Costa Rica	1–0	El Salvador	San José, Costa Rica
	Fernández			Stadium: Estadio Nacional de Costa Rica; Attendance: 26,000; Referee: Jorge Orellana Vimos (Ecuador)

30 July 1989 1989 CONCACAF Championship	Trinidad and Tobago	2–0	El Salvador	Port of Spain, Trinidad and Tobago
	Lewis 50', 61'			Stadium: National Stadium; Attendance: 30,000; Referee: Tony Evangelista (Canada)

13 August 1989 1989 CONCACAF Championship	El Salvador	0–0	Trinidad and Tobago	Tegucigalpa, Honduras
				Stadium: Estadio Nacional; Attendance: 16,882

17 September 1989 1989 CONCACAF Championship	El Salvador	0–1	United States	Tegucigalpa, Honduras
			Pérez 61'	Stadium: Estadio Nacional; Attendance: 3,700; Referee: Edgardo Codesal (Mexico)

5 November 1989 1989 CONCACAF Championship	United States	0–0	El Salvador	Fenton, United States
				Stadium: Saint Louis Soccer Park; Attendance: 8,500; Referee: John Meachin (Canada)

19 November 1989 1989 CONCACAF Championship	El Salvador	Canceled	Guatemala	Guatemala City, Guatemala
				Stadium: Estadio Mateo Flores

26 November 1989 1989 CONCACAF Championship	Guatemala	Canceled	El Salvador	Guatemala City, Guatemala
				Stadium: Estadio Mateo Flores
