= Barbados national football team results (1929–1979) =

This article provides details of international football games played by the Barbados national football team from 1929 to 1979.

== Results (1920s) ==
Win Draw Loss

=== 1929 ===
20 April Friendly	Barbados	3–0	Trinidad and Tobago	Barbados
	McIntosh; Emprage

22 April Friendly	Barbados	2–0	Trinidad and Tobago	Barbados
	Ashby

24 April Friendly	Barbados	2–1	Trinidad and Tobago	Barbados
	Sharpe		Achong

== Results (1930s) ==
=== 1931 ===
9 February Friendly	Barbados	1–2	(France) Martinique	Bridgetown, Barbados

11 February Friendly	Barbados	3–2	(France) Martinique	Bridgetown, Barbados
	Ashby; ?; ?	Report	De Kadel

12 February Friendly	Barbados	0–0	(France) Martinique	Bridgetown, Barbados

9 March Martinez Shield	Trinidad and Tobago	7–1	Barbados	Georgetown, British Guiana
	Achong; A. Daniel; W. Brown; L. Carter		L. Gittens	Stadium: B.G.F.A. Ground; Attendance: 15,000

13 March Martinez Shield	Guiana	9–0	Barbados	Georgetown, British Guiana
	L. Lopes; O. T. Donald; W. Mathias			Stadium: B.G.F.A. Ground

16 March Martinez Shield	Trinidad and Tobago	5–1	Barbados	Georgetown, British Guiana
	S. E. Agostini; Achong; A. Halfhide; L. Carter; E. Thompson		?	Stadium: B.G.F.A. Ground

20 March Martinez Shield	Guiana	7–0	Barbados	Georgetown, British Guiana
	O. T. Donald; M. Nascimento; R. E. Weekes; E. S. Evelyn			Stadium: B.G.F.A. Ground

=== 1932 ===
16 April Martinez Shield	Barbados	0–1	Guiana	Bridgetown, Barbados
			Mittelhozer	Stadium: Kensington Oval

18 April Martinez Shield	Barbados	1–0	Trinidad and Tobago	Bridgetown, Barbados
	Sealy (pen.)			Stadium: Kensington Oval

23 March Martinez Shield	Barbados	2–2	Guiana	Bridgetown, Barbados
	Sealy		(pen.) Mittelhozer; (o.g.) Martindale	Stadium: Kensington Oval

26 March Martinez Shield	Barbados	1–3	Trinidad and Tobago	Bridgetown, Barbados
	Sealy		Charles; Achong	Stadium: Kensington Oval; Attendance: 1,200

=== 1933 ===
23 October Friendly	Trinidad and Tobago	8–4	Barbados	Trinidad and Tobago
	Achoy; Bradshaw		Sealy; Paris

26 October Martinez Shield	Barbados	0–2	Guiana	Port of Spain, Trinidad and Tobago
			Donald; Moore	Stadium: Queen's Park Oval

30 October Martinez Shield	Trinidad and Tobago	3–1	Barbados	Port of Spain, Trinidad and Tobago
	Alkins; McClure; S. Foster (o.g.)		L. Foster	Stadium: Queen's Park Oval

1 November Martinez Shield	Barbados	2–5	Guiana	Port of Spain, Trinidad and Tobago
	L. Foster; G. A. Ashby		(o.g.) C. B. Stuart; Denbow; Moore; Donald	Stadium: Queen's Park Oval

6 November Martinez Shield	Trinidad and Tobago	6–0	Barbados	Port of Spain, Trinidad and Tobago
	Wilkinson; Daniel; Alkins; R. Lewis; Bradshaw			Stadium: Queen's Park Oval

=== 1936 ===
2 May Friendly	Barbados	1–2	Grenada	Barbados

12 September Friendly	St. Vincent and the Grenadines	1–1	Barbados	St. Vincent and the Grenadines

14 September Friendly	St. Vincent and the Grenadines	1–1	Barbados	St. Vincent and the Grenadines

== Results (1940s) ==
=== 1942 ===
11 April Friendly	Barbados	3–3	Trinidad and Tobago	Barbados

=== 1944 ===
Unknown date Friendly	Trinidad and Tobago	5–0	Barbados	Trinidad and Tobago

4 May Friendly	Barbados	1–1	Trinidad and Tobago	Barbados

8 May Friendly	Barbados	1–1	Trinidad and Tobago	Barbados

10 May Friendly	Barbados	1–4	Trinidad and Tobago	Barbados

5 October Friendly	Trinidad and Tobago	3–0	Barbados	Trinidad and Tobago
	Sealy 46'; Stollmeyer 80'; Alkins 85'

7 October Friendly	Barbados	0–3	Guiana	Trinidad and Tobago
			Rodrigues; Moore

9 October Friendly	Trinidad and Tobago	6–1	Barbados	Trinidad and Tobago
	Sealy; Alkins; Burnett		A. G. Williams

11 October Friendly	Barbados	0–1	Guiana	Trinidad and Tobago
			Rodrigues

== Results (1950s) ==
=== 1951 ===
19 March Friendly	Barbados	1–3	Grenada	Barbados
	Williams		Renwick; Berkeley

21 March Friendly	Barbados	3–2	Grenada	Barbados
	Wilkes 2', 46'; Blades 5'		Berkeley; Renwick

25 May Friendly	Barbados	3–0	Jamaica	Barbados
	Lucas 43'; Drayton 55', 64'			Attendance: 5,000

26 May Friendly	Barbados	0–1	Jamaica	Barbados
			(o.g.)

28 May Friendly	Barbados	5–2	Jamaica	Barbados
	Hutchinson 2'; Walcott 40' (pen.); Johnson 54', 56'; Lucas 76'		(o.g.); Miller 51'

=== 1959 ===
2 March Friendly	Trinidad and Tobago	2–0	Barbados	Port of Spain, Trinidad and Tobago
	Baptiste 5'; Gray 15'

4 March Friendly	Barbados	1–3	Jamaica	Port of Spain, Trinidad and Tobago
	Haynes		36', 47', 57' Parker	Attendance: 400

9 March Friendly	Barbados	2–1	Guiana	Port of Spain, Trinidad and Tobago
	Stuart 60'; Downes 63'		?	Attendance: 150

== Results (1960s) ==
=== 1966 ===
? January Friendly	Barbados	1–1	Guiana	Barbados

=== 1968 ===
6 April Friendly	Barbados	0–2	Suriname	Barbados

8 April Friendly	Barbados	0–0	Suriname	Barbados

== Results (1970s) ==
=== 1971 ===
30 November Friendly	Barbados	1–3	Netherlands Antilles	Barbados

=== 1973 ===
8 February Friendly	Barbados	3–2	Haiti	Barbados

6 November BWIA Trophy	Suriname	2–0	Barbados	Georgetown, Guyana
	Edwin Schaal; Leslie Damon			Stadium: Guyana Sports Club ground

=== 1975 ===
31 March Friendly	Barbados	1–0	Suriname	Barbados

5 october Friendly	Antigua and Barbuda	1–0	Barbados	Antigua and Barbuda

=== 1976 ===
15 August 1978 FIFA World Cup qualification	Barbados	2–1	Trinidad and Tobago	Bridgetown, Barbados
	Clarke 47', 54' (pen.)	Report	83' David	Stadium: Barbados National Stadium; Attendance: 5,000; Referee: Josephius Steeman (Suriname)

31 August 1978 FIFA World Cup qualification	Trinidad and Tobago	1–0	Barbados	Port of Spain, Trinidad and Tobago
	Douglas 35'	Report		Stadium: Queen's Park Oval; Attendance: 15,978; Referee: Theodorus Koetsier (Netherlands Antilles)

14 September 1978 FIFA World Cup qualification	Barbados	1–3	Trinidad and Tobago	Bridgetown, Barbados
	Clarke 26'	Report	3' Llewellyn; 74' Carpette; 85' Archibald	Stadium: Barbados National Stadium; Attendance: 4,188; Referee: Ramón Calderon (Cuba)

=== 1977 ===
? October Friendly	Guyana	2–0	Barbados	Guyana

? October Friendly	Guyana	0–0	Barbados	Guyana

? October Friendly	Guyana	0–0	Barbados	Guyana

=== 1978 ===
1 May Friendly	Barbados	1–0	Guyana	Barbados

3 May Friendly	Barbados	3–0	Guyana	Barbados

25 June Friendly	Barbados	0–0	Netherlands Antilles	Bridgetown, Barbados

29 July Friendly	Netherlands Antilles	1–0	Barbados	Netherlands Antilles

25 November Friendly	Grenada	2–0	Barbados	St. George's, Grenada

26 November Friendly	Grenada	0–0	Barbados	St. George's, Grenada

=== 1979 ===
28 February Friendly	Barbados	2–2	Trinidad and Tobago	Bridgetown, Barbados

31 March Friendly	Barbados	1–2	(France) Martinique	Bridgetown, Barbados
	?	Report	Aurélia
