= Marco Antonio Dorantes García =

Mexican football referee (1936–2012)

Marco Antonio Dorantes Garcia
- Born: 14 April 1936; Mexico City, Mexico
- Died: 11 August 2012 (aged 76)
- Occupation: Association football referee (retired)
- Years active: 1972–1991

Marco Antonio Dorantes García (April 14, 1936 – August 11, 2012) was a Mexican association football referee active from as early as the 1972 Summer Olympics until the 1991-1992 UEFA Cup. Dorantes Garcia was a fluent speaker of Spanish, English, and German. He married Teresa Ramires had two children Beatriz and a boy. Years later he married Maria Eugenia Velazquez no children. Marco Antonio had five children aurora and they married and now have seven grandchildren

== Career ==
Dorantes Garcia was the referee for one match in the 1972 Summer Olympics, where West Germany defeated the United States by a score of 7–0 on August 31 in the first round. He returned for the 1976 Summer Olympics, where he refereed two matches. The first was in the first round between Korea DPR and Canada, where Korea DPR defeated Canada by a score of 3–1 on July 21. The second match was a semi-finals match between the Soviet Union and East Germany, which East Germany won by a score of 2–1 on July 27.

Later in 1976, Dorantes Garcia refereed two CONCACAF 1978 FIFA World Cup qualification matches. The first match took place on September 24 between the United States and Canada, which ended in a draw of 1–1. The second was a second round match on December 29 between Haiti and Cuba, which Haiti won by a score of 2–0, advancing them to the championship.

In 1980, Dorantes Garcia refereed one match in the 1981 CONCACAF Championship qualification for the 1982 FIFA World Cup on October 26. The match was between Honduras and Guatemala, which ended in a 0–0 draw.

Dorantes Garcia died on 11 August 2012 at the age of 76.
