= Isiordia =

Isiordia is a surname. Notable people with the surname include:

- Alejandra Isiordia (born 1994), Mexican volleyball player
- Raúl Isiordia (born 1952), Mexican footballer
