= Paco Solís =

Mexican footballer (born 1952)

Personal information
- Full name: Francisco Javier Solís Cruz
- Date of birth: 4 December 1952 (age 73)
- Place of birth: Tampico, Tamaulipas, Mexico
- Position: Midfielder

Senior career*
Years	Team	Apps	(Gls)
1971–1972	Tampico		
1972–1978	Monterrey		
1978–1981	Atlético Español		
1981–1983	Tigres UANL		
1983–1984	Tampico Madero		
1984–1985	Atlas		

International career
1973–1977	Mexico	9	(2)
Medal record
Men's football
Representing Mexico
CONCACAF Championship
Gold medal – first place	1977 Mexico	Team
- * Club domestic league appearances and goals

Francisco Javier Solís Cruz (born 4 December 1952) is a retired Mexican footballer. Nicknamed Paco Solís, he played as a midfielder for Monterrey, Atlético Español and Tampico Madero throughout the 1970s and 1980s. He also represented Mexico internationally for the 1977 CONCACAF Championship.

== Club career ==
Solís began playing for Tampico for the 1971–72 Mexican Segunda División. Despite this, he only played in a single season as he soon caught the attention of Monterrey to play for their 1972–73 season. Throughout his career with the Rayados, he established himself as being one of the best Mexican midfielders of the 1970s as he played alongside other players such as Ignacio Jáuregui, Magdaleno Cano, Alacrán Jiménez, Guarací Barbosa, Francisco Bertocchi, Romeo Corbo and José Ledezma. He later transferred to Atlético Español where he made it to the club's starting XI within his three-year tenure and had a modestly successful career there. He then transferred to Tigres UANL after receiving offers from Guadalajara and Cruz Azul as he found an agreement with Tigres manager Carlos Miloc. His debut 1981–82 season saw him participate in both matches with the first legged match as a substitute for Juan Rodríguez Jara with the second legged match seeing him part of the initial lineup before being substituted for Gonzalo Valencia. He then returned to Tampico for Tampico Madero upon Miloc's invitation to the club. His final season was spent with Atlas as alongside other older players of his generation such as Luis Enrique Fernández, Antonio de la Torre, José Luis Real and José Luis Ceballos would all begin playing for their 1984–85 season as a part of a project to have them train up the younger players within the existing Atlas roster. Despite having the opportunity to continue his career as a player-manager, Solís chose to retire following his single season with Atlas on his own volition.

== International career ==
Solís made his international debut for Mexico in a 1–2 home loss against Poland on 8 August 1973 after coming in as a substitute for Pepe Delgado in the 68th minute. He wouldn't be called up again until the 1977 CONCACAF Championship qualifiers with Solís scoring the first goal in a 3–0 beating against national rivals United States on 15 October 1976. He continued to play in more friendlies in early 1977 with his most significant contribution in this era scoring the first goal against Hungary in an eventual 1–1 home draw. He was later called up for the 1977 CONCACAF Championship where he made two appearances in the 8–1 thrashing against Suriname and the 3–1 victory over Canada on 15 and 22 October respectively. Despite Mexico winning the tournament and qualifying for the 1978 FIFA World Cup, Solís was inexplicably left out of the final roster for the tournament.
