= Hugo Dávila =

Mexican footballer (1948–2024)

Personal information
- Full name: Hugo Dávila Godínez
- Date of birth: 27 April 1948
- Place of birth: Atemajac de Brizuela, Jalisco, Mexico
- Date of death: 19 December 2024 (aged 76)
- Place of death: Colima, Colima State, Mexico
- Position: Midfielder

Senior career*
Years	Team	Apps	(Gls)
1969–1974	Guadalajara		
1974–1981	Unión de Curtidores		

International career
1970–1976	Mexico	17	(3)
- * Club domestic league appearances and goals

Hugo Dávila Godínez (27 April 1948 – 19 December 2024) was a Mexican footballer. He played as a midfielder for Guadalajara and Unión de Curtidores throughout the 1970s. He also represented Mexico internationally for the 1977 CONCACAF Championship qualifiers.

== Club career ==
Making his senior debut for their 1969–70 season, Dávila's first season with Guadalajara saw them win the trifecta of the 1969–70 Mexican Primera División, the 1969–70 Copa México and the 1969–70 Campeón de Campeones. This would be Chivas' only success in the 1970s however as they entered a rough period throughout the decade though Dávila managed to score two goals against city rivals Atlas. Thus, Dávila found an opportunity to play for Unión de Curtidores which had just been promoted to the Liga MX. There, despite the club not achieving any titles throughout the remainder of the decade, Dávila remained loyal to the club and became the club's captain throughout his later seasons with the club, announcing his retirement following their relegation from the 1980–81 Mexican Primera División.

== International career ==
Dávila made his international debut in a 0–3 loss against Brazil on 4 June 1976 in a friendly after appearing as substitute for Antonio de la Torre. His biggest participation for El Tricolor came through the 1977 CONCACAF Championship qualifiers where he scored the third goal against rivals United States on 15 October via a penalty kick. Despite helping the team qualify for the 1977 CONCACAF Championship after achieving perfect attendance in the tournament, he wasn't selected for the final team and by proxy, was left out of the 1978 FIFA World Cup squad.

== Later life ==
Following his retirement, Dávila served as manager for Loros UdeC and Deportivo Cihuatlán within the Segunda and Tercera Divisiones throughout the 1990s and 2000s. He chose to remain in Colima, dying there on 19 December 2024.
