= Alfredo Rivera =

Alfredo Rivera may refer to:

- A fictional air crew member, performed by comedian The Real Spark
- A senior executive, employed by The Coca-Cola Company
