= Ever Hernández =

Salvadoran footballer (born 1958)

Éver Hernández
Personal information
- Full name: Francisco Éver Hernández Rodríguez
- Date of birth: December 11, 1958 (age 67)
- Place of birth: Santiago de María, El Salvador
- Height: 1.78 m (5 ft 10 in)
- Position: Striker

Senior career*
Years	Team	Apps	(Gls)
1972–1983	Santiagueño		
1983–1986	FAS		
1986	Alianza		

International career
1979–1985	El Salvador	34	(13)
- * Club domestic league appearances and goals as of 3 June 2011

Francisco Éver Hernández Rodríguez (born December 11, 1958) is a retired football player from El Salvador who represented his country at the 1982 FIFA World Cup in Spain.

== Club career ==
Hernández began his career playing for hometown club C.D Santiagueño with whom he won a domestic league title in 1980 but he left them after relegation for C.D. FAS, winning another championship in 1984. He also clinched the top goalscorer award in 1984 with 17 goals. He retired early at only 28 years, after a final league season with Alianza.

== International career ==
He became a hero after scoring a historical goal against Mexico to qualify El Salvador to the 1982 FIFA World Cup.

Hernández scored 13 goals for the El Salvador national football team from 1976 to 1985. He has represented his country in 11 FIFA World Cup qualification matches.

== Retirement ==
After his career, Hernández moved to the United States in 1991 to become a car salesman in Los Angeles. He is married and has three children.

== Honours ==
- Primera División de Fútbol de El Salvador: 2

1980, 1984
