= The Real Spark =

American comedian

James Bates (born 1991 or 1992) is an American comedian, best known as The Real Spark and known for his parody news interview videos.

== Personal life and education ==
Bates is based in Lafayette, Louisiana and was aged 29 in August 2021.

He studied psychology.

== Career ==
Bates is a driver for Uber as well as working full time in video production.

In 2020, he won a YouTube Silver Creator Award.

In a 2021 parody interview that went viral on YouTube and Twitter, Bates played the fictional flight attendant Alfredo Rivera. The video's release followed a real incident on a Frontier Airlines flight and was misunderstood by journalist Piers Morgan as authentic, prompting Morgan to tweet "This is utterly fantastic. We need more people like Alfredo in the world." Television program Good Morning America also misunderstood the parody to be real. On 10 August 2021, AFP Fact Check advised that the "social media sensation is a comedian, not a US flight attendant" In December 2021, Madison Pauly, writing in Mother Jones, described the video as "sidesplitting".

In 2022, Bates released a parody video about a man being charged for indecent exposure.
