= Oscar Sánchez (footballer, born 1955) =

Guatemalan footballer and coach (1955–2019)

Personal information
- Full name: Oscar Enrique Sánchez Rivas
- Date of birth: 15 July 1955
- Place of birth: Escuintla, Guatemala
- Date of death: 25 July 2019 (aged 64)
- Place of death: Guatemala City, Guatemala
- Position: Striker

Youth career
- 1974: Laboratorios Jiménez

Senior career*
Years	Team	Apps	(Gls)
1975	Ases del Minar		(24)
1976–1984	Comunicaciones		
1985	Cobán Imperial		
1986	Municipal		
1987	FAS		(1)
1987	Aurora		
1988	Izabal JC		
1989–1990	Municipal		
1990–1991	Comunicaciones		
1991–1992	Tipografía Nacional		

International career
1976–1989	Guatemala	25	(11)
- * Club domestic league appearances and goals

Oscar Enrique Sánchez Rivas (15 July 1955 – 25 July 2019), popularly known as "La Coneja" (the rabbit), was a Guatemalan footballer and coach who played most of his career for Comunicaciones. He was part of the team that won the 1978 CONCACAF Champions Cup and was the top scorer of the Liga Nacional de Fútbol de Guatemala for four consecutive years.

Sánchez represented the Guatemala national football team at the Olympic Games and in three FIFA World Cup qualification processes.

He is the second highest goalscorer of all time in the Guatemalan league and has been catalogued by journalists of the region as one of the best players in the history of the nation's football. In a 1999 poll by the IFFHS, he was voted the best Guatemalan footballer of the 20th Century and among the best 20 in CONCACAF.

== Club career ==
Sanchez became known when in 1971 he played the National Games in Antigua Guatemala. In 1973 he was selected as a youth in the I Afro Latin American Games that were played in Mexico, and that same year he closed his youth participation in the I Central American Sports Games that were held in Ciudad de Guatemala.

In 1974 he played in the ¨B¨ category at Laboratorios Jimenez, which was looking for his promotion to the Major League, but it was a year later when Escuintla's fans cheered him as a goal scorer, playing with the Aces of the Minar Tiquisate, was present in the rival goals with 24 goals.

In 1976 he began his great trip playing with Comunicaciones, where he played 8 years in his first stage. Together with players like Félix McDonald, Ramón Zanabria and Byron Pérez, they were part of the team that won the CONCACAF Champions Cup 1978 and the 1977-78 league championship; He continued his successful career by finishing third in the Central American Fraternity Cup that year. Sanchez would make both goals of the victory against the great rival, CSD Municipal in the second round of the Central American zone and in the return his team ended up tied to zero. In the third round of Central America (end of the zone), Oscar in the first game scored the winning goal against Deportivo Saprissa of Costa Rica at minute 2 of the game and in the lap played in Guatemala he was again the figure of the match by remarking two goals at minutes 14th and 31st that would mean the classification of Comunicaciones and subsequently the consecration of the "crema" team of the CONCACAF 1978 Champions' Cup.

He was the top scorer in the league from the 1976 season to the 1979–80 season and holds the record for the most goals scored in a league with 41 in the 1977/78 season.

In 1977, Sanchez scored six goals in a 9–0 victory for Comunicaciones against Antigua GFC, tying the historical record of Hugo "Tin tan" Peña of the league in 1961

He also scored five goals in a single game on two other occasions, one that same year against Tipografia Nacional and the other in 1988 against Xelajú MC while playing for CSD Cobán Imperial.

In the 1983 Summer Cup final, Sánchez scored a goal in the 60th minute in Comunicaciones 3–1 victory against Municipal.

In a friendly match played at the Estadio Mateo Flores, Sánchez scored the only goal of the victory of his team Comunicaciones to Dinamo Zagreb of Croatia.

After his departure from Comunicaciones, Sánchez played for the clubs Municipal, Aurora F.C., Cobán, CD FAS de El Salvador and Tipografía Nacional; He retired in 1992, after having scored 320 goals in all competitions.

From 1973 to 1992, he appeared in 609 league matches and scored 244 goals, what remained the league's all-time highest total until surpassed by Juan Carlos Plata in 2006. Sánchez ranks among the world's 150 highest top division goalscorers of all time, according to the IFFHS.

== International career ==
Sanchez helped the Guatemalan national soccer team qualify for the 1976 Olympic Games, where in the 3–2 victory against Mexico, he scored an Olympic goal. He played two games in the final tournament in Montreal, where Guatemala was eliminated in the first round group.

His full international debut occurred on September 26, 1976, at a 1978 World Cup qualification match against Panama, where he scored a hat-trick on a 7–0 win. He also played in the 1982 and 1990 World Cup qualifying campaigns, and overall he scored seven goals in 17 World Cup qualification matches.

== Coaching ==
After his retirement from playing, he became a coach, and managed the clubs Comunicaciones, Achuapa and Jalapa, among others, in the top division, and a number of clubs in lower divisions.

== Death ==
Óscar "La Coneja" Sánchez died at 64 in a health center. Sánchez suffered from health problems for some months and was intervened to change his pacemaker, but he did not survive the intervention, friends and family confirmed.

== Honors ==
With CSD Comunicaciones

- Guatemala Liga Mayor winner (5): 1977–78, 1979–80, 1981, 1982, 1985.
- Guatemala Domestic Cup winner (3): 1983, 1986, 1991
- Copa Fraternidad winner (1): 1983.
- CONCACAF Champions' Cup winner: 1978
- Guatemala Liga Mayor top scorer (3): 1977–78, 1978, 1979–80
