= Leonardo McNish =

Guatemalan footballer (1946–2021)

Personal information
- Full name: Leonardo McNish Christie
- Date of birth: 14 October 1946
- Date of death: 4 December 2021 (aged 75)
- Place of death: Guatemala City, Guatemala
- Position: Defender

Senior career*
| Years | Team | Apps | (Gls) |
- Malacateco
- Marquense
- Tipografía Nacional
| 1968–1969 | Suchitepéquez | | |
| 1970–1977 | Municipal | | |
| 1977–1978 | Galcasa | | |
| 1978–1981 | Cobán Imperial | | |

International career
- Guatemala
- * Club domestic league appearances and goals

Leonardo McNish Christie (14 October 1946 – 4 December 2021) was a Guatemalan footballer who played as a defender for Malacateco, Marquense, Tipografía Nacional, Suchitepéquez, Municipal, Galcasa and Cobán Imperial, as well as the national team.
