= Ernst Jean-Baptiste =

Haitian football manager (born 1956)

Personal information
- Full name: Ernst Marie Jean-Baptiste
- Date of birth: 18 April 1956 (age 70)
- Place of birth: Limbé, Haiti
- Height: 1.80 m (5 ft 11 in)
- Position: Midfielder

Youth career
- 1967–1971: Violette AC

College career
| Years | Team | Apps | (Gls) |
| 1979–1980 | Miami Dade College | | |

Senior career*
| Years | Team | Apps | (Gls) |
| 1971–1978 | Violette AC | | |
| 1975 | → Victory SC (Haiti) (loan) | | |
| 1980 | Miami Americans | | |
| 1980–1981 | Phoenix Inferno (indoor) | 10 | (1) |
| 1981 | New England Sharks | | |
| 1983 | Fort Lauderdale Strikers | 2 | (0) |
| 1984 | Fort Lauderdale Sun | | |

International career
| 1975–1981 | Haiti | 16 | (1) |

Managerial career
- 1984–1989: Miami Dade College
- 1991–1992: Haiti
- 1999: Haiti
- * Club domestic league appearances and goals

Ernst Marie Jean-Baptiste, nicknamed ZeNono and sometimes known as Jean Marie Jean Baptiste, (born 18 April 1956) is a Haitian former professional footballer and manager who played as a midfielder.

== Club career ==
Ernst Jean-Baptiste began his career in Haiti aged 11. He debuted for the senior team of Violette AC at the age of 15 in 1971 and was loaned out to Victory SC in 1975. He then moved to Miami-Dade County, Florida in 1979 to play for the Miami Dade College team.

Between 1980 and 1983, he played for Miami Americans, New England Sharks, and Fort Lauderdale Strikers in the American Soccer League before ending his career at Fort Lauderdale Sun of the United Soccer League in 1984 after the American Soccer League folded.

== International career ==
He made sixteen appearances for the Haiti national team between 1976 and 1981, and represented Haiti during FIFA World Cup qualification (1977 and 1981 editions of the CONCACAF Championship).

He was first called up to the national team in 1975 before he debuted on 2 April 1976 during a 3–0 win against the Dominican Republic during 1977 CONCACAF Championship qualification. He also scored his only goal for Haiti during this match.

== Managerial career ==
He managed Miami Dade College between 1984 and 1989 and reached the national championships on two occasions whilst also winning the La Copa Latina de Miami five times.

Jean-Baptiste became the Haiti national team manager in 1991 but resigned after Haiti were eliminated by Bermuda during the second preliminary round of 1994 FIFA World Cup qualification. He became the manager of Haiti again in 1999 but his short tenure meant he did not oversee any matches with the team.

== Time working with FIFA ==
During his time working with FIFA, Jean-Baptiste organised a friendly match between Haiti and Brazil in August 2004, and he subsequently became the Deputy General Director of Haiti's Ministry of Youth, Sports and Civic Action. This allowed him to attempt to run for the FIFA presidency in 2015, but he was forced to withdraw as he was unable to gain support from the minimum of five required national associations, including the Haitian Football Federation.

== Career statistics ==
=== International ===
As of match played 19 November 1981

Appearances and goals by national team and year
| National team | Year | Apps | Goals |
|---|---|---|---|
| Haiti | 1976 | 6 | 1 |
| Haiti | 1977 | 2 | 0 |
| Haiti | 1978 | 0 | 0 |
| Haiti | 1979 | 0 | 0 |
| Haiti | 1980 | 3 | 0 |
| Haiti | 1981 | 5 | 0 |
| Total | | 16 | 1 |

As of match played 19 November 1981
Haiti score listed first, score column indicates score after each Jean-Baptiste goal

List of international goals scored by Ernst Jean-Baptiste
| No. | Date | Venue | Cap | Opponent | Score | Result | Competition |
|---|---|---|---|---|---|---|---|
| 1 | 2 April 1976 | Estadio Olímpico Félix Sánchez, Santo Domingo, Dominican Republic, | 1 | Dominican Republic | 3–0 | 3–0 | 1977 CONCACAF Championship qualification |

== Managerial statistics ==
Managerial record by team and tenure
| Team | From | To | Record | | | | | | | |
| Team | From | To | G | W | D | L | GF | GA | GD | Win % |
|---|---|---|---|---|---|---|---|---|---|---|
| Haiti | 1991 | 25 May 1992 | 2 | 1 | 0 | 1 | 2 | 2 | +0 | 50.00 |
| Haiti | 1999 | 1999 | 0 | 0 | 0 | 0 | 0 | 0 | +0 | — |
| Total | | | 2 | 1 | 0 | 1 | 2 | 2 | +0 | 50.00 |

== Honours ==
=== As a player ===
Fort Lauderdale Sun

- United Soccer League: 1984

Haiti

- CONCACAF Championship: runner-up 1987

=== As a manager ===
Miami Dade College

- La Copa Latina de Miami: 5 titles
