= Leon Carpette =

Trinidadian footballer (1950–2018)

Personal information
- Full name: Peter Mitchell
- Date of birth: 10 April 1950
- Place of birth: San Fernando, Trinidad and Tobago
- Date of death: 26 October 2018 (aged 68)
- Place of death: San Fernando, Trinidad and Tobago
- Height: 1.85 m (6 ft 1 in)
- Position: Midfielder

Youth career
- San Fernando Boys R.C.

Senior career*
Years	Team	Apps	(Gls)
- Paragon
c. 1969–1973	San Fernando Strikers		

International career
1973–1976	Trinidad and Tobago	4	(1)
Medal record
Men's football
Representing Trinidad and Tobago
CONCACAF Championship
Silver medal – second place	1973 Haiti	Team
- * Club domestic league appearances and goals

Leon Ezekiel Carpette (10 April 1950 – 26 October 2018) was a Trinidadian footballer. Nicknamed "Nabb", he played as a midfielder for Paragon and the San Fernando Strikers throughout the 1970s. He also represented his native Trinidad and Tobago for the 1973 CONCACAF Championship as well as the 1977 CONCACAF Championship qualifiers.

== Club career ==
In 1969, Carpette began playing for the San Fernando Strikers and became one of the leading players for the club throughout the early 1970s.

== International career ==
Carpette made one appearance during the 1973 CONCACAF Championship, narrowly missing the qualification for the 1974 FIFA World Cup. He was more significant during the 1977 CONCACAF Championship qualifiers however, scoring in the 1–3 victory against Barbados despite the Soca Warriors ultimately failing to qualify for the 1977 CONCACAF Championship.

== Later life ==
Carpette later had three daughters: Ayanna, Safiya and Akilah as well as two granddaughters: Aalon and Aliya.

Since October 2017, Carpette had suffered from two strokes with his health deteriorating by the next year. He would succumb to the effects of his strokes on 26 October 2018 despite his family and friends asking for financial support to his treatment.

== Honours ==
Trinidad and Tobago

- CONCACAF Championship : Runner-up, 1973
