= Peter Sandoval =

Guatemalan footballer

Personal information
- Date of birth: 22 April 1947
- Date of death: 9 September 2020 (aged 73)
- Position: Forward

International career
| Years | Team | Apps | (Gls) |
- Guatemala

Peter Sandoval (22 April 1947 – 9 September 2020) was a Guatemalan footballer. He competed in the men's tournament at the 1976 Summer Olympics.
