= Bob Bolitho =

Canadian soccer player

Personal information
- Date of birth: July 20, 1952 (age 74)
- Place of birth: Victoria, British Columbia, Canada
- Positions: Defensive midfielder; defender

Senior career*
Years	Team	Apps	(Gls)
1969–7?	Victoria O'Keefe	?	(?)
197?–1976	London Boxing Club	?	(?)
1977–1980	Vancouver Whitecaps	87	(5)
1979–1980	→ Los Angeles Aztecs (indoor)	12	(6)
1980	Tulsa Roughnecks	12	(1)
1980–1981	Tulsa Roughnecks (indoor)	1	(1)
1981–1983	Fort Lauderdale Strikers	79	(6)
1983	Fort Lauderdale Strikers (indoor)	1	(1)
1984	Minnesota Strikers	12	(1)
1984	Tampa Bay Rowdies	6	(1)
1989	Victoria Vistas	4	(0)

International career^{‡}
1974–1981	Canada	23	(2)
1975, 1976	Canadian Olympic (amateur)	11	(1)
- * Club domestic league appearances and goals as of May 19, 2008 ‡ National team caps and goals as of May 19, 2008

Robert Bolitho (born July 20, 1952) is a Canadian former soccer player who played for the Canadian national team and in the North American Soccer League and Canadian Soccer League.

== Club career ==
Bolitho played as a teenager of Pacific Coast Soccer League side Victoria O'Keefe S.C. before joining the soccer team of the London Boxing Club in Victoria, for whom he won a Canadian Club Championship national title in 1975. The following summer Bolitho joined the Vancouver Whitecaps and remained with the club until 1980. He was a member of their Soccer Bowl winning team in 1979, playing at right back in the Soccer Bowl win over the Tampa Bay Rowdies. He went on loan to the Los Angeles Aztecs during the 1979–1980 NASL indoor season. In 1980, Bolitho began the season with the Whitecaps before being traded to the Tulsa Roughnecks with whom he played the rest of the 1980 outdoor as well as the 1980–1981 NASL indoor season. In 1981, he moved to the Fort Lauderdale Strikers. In 1984, the Strikers moved to Minnesota where they became the Minnesota Strikers. He began as a starter that season, but soon moved to the substitutes bench before being traded to the Tampa Bay Rowdies. Bolitho then played one season for Victoria Vistas in the CSL in 1989.

== International career ==
Bolitho was on the Canadian squad at the 1975 Pan American Games and was a member of the Olympic team at the 1976 Summer Olympics, playing against the Soviet Union in Montreal and North Korea in Toronto. He played a defensive midfield role in the early days of his first class career before settling down at right back. Bolitho scored an impressive equalizing goal against the United States in Vancouver in 1976 in a World Cup qualifier and scored again later that year in a 3–0 win over the U.S. in a playoff in Port-au-Prince, Haiti, which allowed Canada to advance to the final round in 1978 World Cup qualifying.

=== International goals ===
Scores and results list Canada's goal tally first.

#	Date	Venue	Opponent	Score	Result	Competition
1	September 24, 1976	Empire Stadium, Vancouver, Canada	United States	1–1	1–1	1978 FIFA World Cup qualification
2	December 22, 1976	Stade Sylvio Cator, Port-au-Prince, Haiti	United States	3–0	3–0	1978 FIFA World Cup qualification
