= Carl Brown (footballer) =

Jamaican footballer and manager (born 1950)

Personal information
- Date of birth: 30 October 1950 (age 75)
- Place of birth: Kingston, Jamaica
- Position: Defender

Senior career*
Years	Team	Apps	(Gls)
- Boys' Town F.C.

International career
1970–1980	Jamaica		

Managerial career
- 1990–1994: Jamaica
- 2001–2004: Jamaica
- 2006: Jamaica
- 2007–2011: Cayman Islands
- 2011–2015: Cayman Islands U-23
- * Club domestic league appearances and goals

Carl Brown (born 30 October 1950) is a Jamaican former professional football player, who played as a defender, and manager.

== Playing career ==
Brown was born in Kingston and played for Boys' Town F.C.

In 1970, Brown made his debut for the Jamaica national team. He represented at the 1975 Pan American Games.

== Post-playing career ==
From 1990 to 1994, 2001 to 2004, and in 2006, he coached the Jamaica national team. Between August 2007 and June 2011, he was a head coach of the Cayman Islands national football team.

As of 2014, he served on the CONCACAF Technical Committee.
