= Javier Masís =

Costa Rican footballer (born 1953)

Personal information
- Full name: Javier Masís Figueroa
- Date of birth: 16 April 1953 (age 73)
- Place of birth: San José, Costa Rica
- Position: Defender

Youth career
- 1956–1971: Deportivo Saprissa

Senior career*
Years	Team	Apps	(Gls)
1971–1982	Deportivo Saprissa		

International career
1976–1980	Costa Rica	9	(1)
- * Club domestic league appearances and goals

Javier "Michelin" Masís Figueroa (born 16 April 1953) is a Costa Rican former footballer. He competed in the men's tournament at the 1980 Summer Olympics.

== Club career ==
From 1965 until 1982, Masís spent his entire club career with Deportivo Saprissa. He made his debut for the club on 18 April 1971 and won seven Primera División de Costa Rica titles with the club.

== International career ==
Masís made nine appearances for Costa Rica, and he competed in the 1977 CONCACAF Championship qualification and also the men's tournament at the 1980 Summer Olympics.

He debuted on 4 April 1976 during a 3–2 loss against Panama, and he scored his only international goal on 15 December 1976 during a 1–1 draw against El Salvador.

== Career statistics ==
=== International ===
As of match played 25 July 1980

Appearances and goals by national team and year
National team	Year	Apps	Goals
Costa Rica	1976	6	1
Costa Rica	1980	3	0
Total		9	1

As of match played 25 July 1980
Costa Rica score listed first, score column indicates score after each Figueroa goal

List of international goals scored by Reece James
No.	Date	Venue	Cap	Opponent	Score	Result	Competition
1	15 December 1976	Estadio Nacional de Costa Rica, San José, Costa Rica	6	El Salvador	1–0	1–1	1977 CONCACAF Championship qualification

== Honours ==
=== Deportivo Saprissa ===
- Primera División de Costa Rica: 1972, 1973, 1974, 1975, 1976, 1977, 1982; runner-up 1971
- Torneo de Copa de Costa Rica: 1972
- Supercopa de Costa Rica: 1976
