= CSD Galcasa =

Association football club in Guatemala

Club Social y Deportivo Galcasa de Villa Nueva or CSD Galcasa was a Guatemalan football club, which won the Copa de Guatemala in 1980, and were Liga Nacional de Fútbol de Guatemala runners-up in 1986.
