= José Emilio Mitrovich =

Argentine-born Guatemalan footballer (born 1947)

Personal information
- Date of birth: 8 July 1947 (age 79)
- Place of birth: Mar del Plata, Argentina
- Height: 1.77 m (5 ft 10 in)
- Position: Attacking midfielder

Youth career
- Racing Club

Senior career*
Years	Team	Apps	(Gls)
1968	Quilmes	4	(0)
1969–1971	Kimberley	18+	(6+)
1971–1972	Toluca		
1972–1973	Veracruz		
1973	Chacarita Juniors		
1974–1975	Municipal		
1976	Aurora		
1977	Municipal		
1978–1983	Cobán Imperial		
1983	Aurora		
1984	Cobán Imperial		

International career
1977–1980	Guatemala	11	(4)
- * Club domestic league appearances and goals

José Emilio Mitrovich (born 8 July 1947) is a former footballer who played as an attacking midfielder. Born in Argentina, he represented the Guatemala national team.

== Club career ==
Mitrovich began his career in the youth team of Racing Club. In 1968, he joined Quilmes, where he made four appearances in his first season. He then joined Kimberley de Mar del Plata, helping them get promoted to the Primera División, where he scored six goals in 18 matches. In 1971, during a match between Kimberley and San Lorenzo, he was involved in a dubious penalty decision after pulling on the shirt of Miguel Ángel Serna, with the match ending in a pitch invasion by Kimberley fans who were trying to attack referee José Francisco Bujedo.

In 1973, after touring Central America with Chacarita Juniors, he joined Guatemalan club Municipal. The following year, he helped them secure both the Liga Nacional and Copa Fraternidad titles, before scoring twice in the second leg of the 1974 CONCACAF Champions' Cup final to beat Surinamese side Transvaal.

In total, he scored 121 goals in the Liga Nacional across his career.

== International career ==
Born in Argentina, Mitrovich obtained Guatemalan citizenship in 1977, having played there since 1974. He made a total of 11 appearances for the Guatemala national team between 1977 and 1980, scoring four goals and competing in the 1977 CONCACAF Championship.

== Coaching career ==
In May 2014, he joined the technical staff of the Guatemala national team.
