= Vibert Butts =

Guyanese soccer player

Personal information
- Full name: Vibert Durdy Butts
- Date of birth: 1956 or 1957 (age 68–69)

International career
Years	Team	Apps	(Gls)
1973–1978	Guyana		

Vibert Durdy Butts is a former Guyanese soccer player best known for scoring Guyana's first-ever FIFA World Cup qualification goal during a 1976 match against Suriname, which helped Guyana to a 2–0 victory. In 2015, Butts was sentenced to three years in prison for possession of 46 grams of cannabis.
