= Leintz Domingue =

Haitian footballer (died 2021)

Personal information
- Date of birth: 11 January 1945
- Place of birth: Haiti
- Date of death: 18 June 2021 (aged 76)
- Place of death: Port-au-Prince, Haiti
- Position: Forward

Senior career*
Years	Team	Apps	(Gls)
- Victory SC
- Racing Club Haïtien

International career
1967–1977	Haiti		(9)
- * Club domestic league appearances and goals

Leintz Domingue (sometimes spelt Leinz or Lentz; 11 January 1945 – 18 June 2021) was a Haitian footballer who played as a forward, and was considered one of the best Haitian footballers of the 1970s.

Domingue died in Port-au-Prince on 18 June 2021, at the age of 70, following a cardiac arrest.

== Career ==
Domingue represented the Haiti national team between 1967 and 1977, scoring nine goals, including six in 1978 FIFA World Cup qualification. He also represented Haiti at the 1967, 1971, and 1977 CONCACAF Championships, however wasn't selected for their 1974 FIFA World Cup squad.
