= 1977 CONCACAF Championship =

Tournament details
- Host country: Mexico
- Dates: 8–23 October
- Teams: 6 (from 1 confederation)
- Venues: 2 (in 2 host cities)

Final positions
- Champions: Mexico (3rd title)
- Runners-up: Haiti
- Third place: El Salvador
- Fourth place: Canada

Tournament statistics
- Matches played: 15
- Goals scored: 55 (3.67 per match)
- Attendance: 790,097 (52,673 per match)
- Top scorer: (Mexico) Víctor Rangel (6 goals)

The 1977 CONCACAF Championship, the seventh edition of the CONCACAF Championship, was held in Mexico from 8 to 23 October. Mexico, as the host nation, easily secured a third title and a place in Argentina '78 since the tournament also served as qualification to the World Cup. The North, Central American and Caribbean zone was allocated 1 place (out of 16) in the final tournament.

== Teams ==
- Canada
- El Salvador
- Guatemala
- Haiti
- Mexico (Hosts)
- Suriname

== Venues ==
1977 CONCACAF Championship is located in Mexico	Mexico City	San Nicolás de los Garza
1977 CONCACAF Championship is located in Mexico	Estadio Azteca	Estadio Universitario
1977 CONCACAF Championship is located in Mexico	Capacity: 105,000	Capacity: 41,615

== Final round ==
Pos	Team	Pld	W	D	L	GF	GA	GD	Pts	Qualification
1	Mexico (C)	5	5	0	0	20	5	+15	10	1978 FIFA World Cup
2	Haiti	5	3	1	1	6	6	0	7	
3	El Salvador	5	2	1	2	8	9	−1	5	
4	Canada	5	2	1	2	7	8	−1	5	
5	Guatemala	5	1	1	3	8	10	−2	3	
6	Suriname	5	0	0	5	6	17	−11	0	

Source: RSSSF
(C) Champions
8 October 1977

Guatemala	3–2	Suriname
McDonald 15', 38'; Alfaro 85'		Schal 2'; Rigters 55'

Estadio Universitario, Monterrey
Attendance: 26,065
Referee: Wuertz (United States)

8 October 1977

Canada	1–2	El Salvador
Budd 85'		Zapata 44', 84'

Estadio Universitario, Monterrey
Attendance: 42,000
Referee: Pestarino (Argentina)

9 October 1977

Mexico	4–1	Haiti
Sánchez 1'; Rangel 46', 70', 82'		Auguste 78'

Estadio Azteca, Mexico City
Attendance: 108,000
Referee: Barreto Ruiz (Uruguay)

12 October 1977

Canada	2–1	Suriname
Parsons 32'; Bakić 74'		Olmberg 40' (pen.)

Estadio Azteca, Mexico City
Attendance: 90,000
Referee: Siles Calderón (Costa Rica)

12 October 1977

Mexico	3–1	El Salvador
Cárdenas 36'; Rangel 59', 90'		Huezo 75'

Estadio Azteca, Mexico City
Attendance: 110,000
Referee: Toros Kibritjian (United States)

12 October 1977

Guatemala	1–2	Haiti
Mitrovich 58'		Domingue 20' (pen.); Bayonne 44'

Estadio Universitario, Monterrey
Attendance: 13,465
Referee: Pestarino (Argentina)

15 October 1977

Mexico	8–1	Suriname
Rangel 24'; Isiordia 37', 49'; Sánchez 39', 90'; Jiménez 73', 84'; Chávez 80'		Schal 23' (pen.)

Estadio Universitario, Monterrey
Attendance: 52,000
Referee: Valverde Salazar (Costa Rica)

16 October 1977

El Salvador	0–1	Haiti
		Sanon 24'

Estadio Azteca, Mexico City
Attendance: 53,978
Referee: Calderón Castro (Cuba)

16 October 1977

Canada	2–1	Guatemala
Parsons 20'; B. Lenarduzzi 35'		Alfaro 62'

Estadio Azteca, Mexico City
Attendance: 25,000
Referee: Barreto Ruiz (Uruguay)

19 October 1977

Mexico	2–1	Guatemala
Vázquez 28' (pen.); Cárdenas 81'		Mitrovich 44'

Estadio Azteca, Mexico City
Attendance: 110,000
Referee: Pestarino (Argentina)

20 October 1977

El Salvador	3–2	Suriname
González 42'; Rosas 77', 87'		Emanuelson 58'; Olmberg 89' (pen.)

Estadio Universitario, Monterrey
Attendance: 34,476
Referee: Crokwell (Bermuda)

20 October 1977

Canada	1–1	Haiti
Bakić 90'		Dorsainville 78'

Estadio Universitario, Monterrey
Attendance: 30,000
Referee: Valverde Salazar (Costa Rica)

22 October 1977

Mexico	3–1	Canada
Guzmán 31', 40'; Sánchez 65'		Parsons 9'

Estadio Universitario, Monterrey
Attendance: 55,000
Referee: Moses (Netherlands Antilles)

23 October 1977

Guatemala	2–2	El Salvador
Rivera 58', 75'		Rosas 44'; Huezo 85'

Estadio Azteca, Mexico City
Attendance: 21,483
Referee: De la Puente (Dominican Republic)

23 October 1977

Haiti	1–0	Suriname
Domingue 7'

Estadio Azteca, Mexico City
Attendance: 18,630
Referee: Oritz Pérez (Honduras)

Mexico qualified for the 1978 FIFA World Cup.

1977 CONCACAF Championship winners

Mexico
Third title

== Goalscorers ==
6 goals

- (Mexico) Víctor Rangel

4 goals

- (Mexico) Hugo Sánchez

3 goals

- (Canada) Buzz Parsons
- (El Salvador) Elmer Rosas

2 goals

- (Canada) Mike Bakić
- (El Salvador) Luis Ramírez Zapata
- (El Salvador) Norberto Huezo
- (Guatemala) Felix McDonald
- (Guatemala) Mario René Alfaro
- (Guatemala) José Emilio Mitrovich
- (Guatemala) Sergio Rivera
- (Haiti) Leintz Domingue
- (Mexico) Alacrán Jiménez
- (Mexico) Javier Cárdenas
- (Mexico) Javier Guzmán
- (Mexico) Raul Isiordia
- (Suriname) Edwin Schal
- (Suriname) Remie Olmberg

1 goal

- (Canada) Bob Lenarduzzi
- (Canada) Brian Budd
- (El Salvador) Mágico González
- (Haiti) Arsène Auguste
- (Haiti) Pierre Bayonne
- (Haiti) Guy Dorsainville
- (Haiti) Emmanuel Sanon
- (Mexico) Arturo Vázquez Ayala
- (Mexico) Chepe Chávez
- (Suriname) Delano Rigters
- (Suriname) Errol Emanuelson

== See also ==
- 1978 FIFA World Cup qualification
- 1978 FIFA World Cup qualification (UEFA)
- 1978 FIFA World Cup qualification (CONMEBOL)
- 1978 FIFA World Cup qualification (CAF)
- 1978 FIFA World Cup qualification (AFC and OFC)
