= Miro Rys =

American soccer player

Personal information
- Date of birth: July 18, 1957
- Place of birth: Kladno, Czechoslovakia
- Date of death: September 12, 1977 (aged 20)
- Place of death: Germany
- Position: Forward

Senior career*
Years	Team	Apps	(Gls)
1976–1977	Chicago Sting	19	(4)
1977	Los Angeles Aztecs	2	(0)

International career
1976	United States	3	(1)
- * Club domestic league appearances and goals

Miro Rys (July 18, 1957 – September 1977) was a Czech American soccer forward who played professionally in the North American Soccer League. Rys earned three caps, scoring one goal, with the U.S. national team. A talented striker with, according to Bill Foulkes, "a cannon-like shot and a tremendous desire", Rys was the biggest American soccer prospect of his time and, according to Jim Pollihan, was expected to become "the top American player in a year or two" when he died in a car accident outside Dortmund, Germany while there to try out for several professional teams.

== Club career ==
Born in Czechoslovakia, Rys grew up in Cicero, Illinois where he played high school soccer at Morton East High School. Following his graduation in 1976, Rys signed a professional contract with the Chicago Sting of the North American Soccer League. He played seventeen games and scored four goals for Chicago Sting that season. After the season, he trained with Manchester United and Tranmere Rovers.

Rys was traded to the Los Angeles Aztecs during the 1977 season. He played in two games, scoring two goals for the Aztecs.

== International career ==
Rys earned three caps with the U.S. national team in 1976. His first game came in a World Cup qualifier against Canada in Seattle on October 20, 1976. Rys scored in that game, a 2–0 victory, making him one of a handful of U.S. players who have scored in their debut match. Rys then played in two scoreless ties with Haiti. He was at the time the youngest U.S. player to appear in a World Cup qualifying game.

The Illinois High School Soccer Association (IHSSCA) awards an annual Miro Rys Sportsmanship Award.

== Death ==
After the season, Rys traveled to Germany for tryouts with clubs including Hertha Berlin and Borussia Dortmund. On Sept. 12, while riding in a car with a local coach and several young players from a team he'd been training with, he was killed in two-vehicle accident outside Dortmund. While he is often said to have signed with Hertha Berlin, there is no record of him ever winning a contract with any European club.
