= Louidor Labissiere =

Haitian footballer

Personal information
- Place of birth: Haiti
- Position: Forward

Senior career*
Years	Team	Apps	(Gls)
1971–1977	Aigle Noir AC		
1978	Ottawa Tigers		

International career
1976–1977	Haiti	8	(1)
- * Club domestic league appearances and goals

Louidor Labissiere is a Haitian former footballer who played as a forward.

== Career ==
Labissiere played with Aigle Noir AC in 1971 in the Ligue Haïtienne, and played seven seasons with the club. In 1978, he played abroad in the National Soccer League with the Ottawa Tigers. He made his debut for Ottawa on June 2, 1978 in a friendly match against Hibernian F.C.

== International career ==
He made his debut for the Haiti national football team on April 2, 1976 against Dominican Republic. He recorded his first goal against Netherlands Antilles in the 1977 CONCACAF Championship qualification, and in total he appeared in eight matches for Haiti.
