= Francisco Fariñas =

Cuban footballer (born 1948)

Personal information
- Full name: Francisco Fariñas Gutierrez
- Date of birth: 2 April 1948 (age 78)
- Place of birth: Havana, Cuba
- Height: 1.64 m (5 ft 5 in)
- Position: Forward

Senior career*
Years	Team	Apps	(Gls)
1964–1981	Industriales		

International career
1971–1981	Cuba		
- * Club domestic league appearances and goals

Francisco Fariñas Gutiérrez (born 2 April 1948) is a Cuban former footballer who competed in the 1976 Summer Olympics.

== Club career ==
Born in Havana, Fariñas came through at Las Cañas before joining Industriales where he spent his entire senior career. His year of birth is also reported as 1949 or 1950.

== International career ==
He represented his country in 10 FIFA World Cup qualifying matches and played two games at the 1976 Summer Olympics. He also played at the 1967 and 1971 Pan American Games.
