= Rinaldo Entingh =

Surinamese footballer

Personal information
- Full name: Rinaldo Stanley Entingh
- Date of birth: June 9, 1953
- Place of birth: Paramaribo, Surinam
- Position: Midfielder

Youth career
- Robinhood

Senior career*
Years	Team	Apps	(Gls)
1973–1986	Robinhood	?	(?)

International career^{‡}
1972–1985	Suriname	27	(5)
- * Club domestic league appearances and goals as of December 21, 2015 ‡ National team caps and goals as of December 21, 2015

Rinaldo Stanley Entingh (June 9, 1953) is a former Surinamese footballer. He played as a midfielder in the SVB Hoofdklasse for S.V. Robinhood and for the Suriname national team.

== Biography ==
Entingh was born June 9, 1953. He began his career with S.V. Robinhood where he progressed through the youth ranks. Through the seventies he formed the attack of the first team together with Errol Emanuelson and Roy George in what would be one of the club's most successful periods. Helping Robinhood to 4 appearances in the CONCACAF Champions' Cup finals in 1976, 1977, 1982, 1983. With Robinhood, Entingh would champion the Hoofdklasse nine times, namely in 1975, 1976, 1979, 1980, 1981, 1983, 1984, 1985, 1986, also winning the Surinamese Footballer of the Year award in 1974 and in 1983.

Entingh played for the Suriname national team almost his entire playing career. He made his debut for the first team in 1972 in a 1–1 draw against Trinidad and Tobago for the country's 1974 FIFA World Cup qualifying campaign. He scored his first goal against the Netherlands Antilles in Willemstad, Curaçao, scoring the opener in a 1–1 draw.

In 1978, Entingh helped Suriname to win the CFU Championship. He also helped his country to an eighth-place finish in the final round of the 1978 FIFA World Cup qualification in Mexico. He played for the Olympic team in their 1980 Summer Olympics qualification. He also played in the 1982 and 1986 FIFA World Cup qualifications for Suriname.

In March 2021, Rinaldo Entingh has sent good luck wishes to the Suriname national football team for the 2022 FIFA World Cup qualifiers.

== Career statistics ==
=== International goals ===
Scores and results list Suriname' goal tally first.

Goal	Date	Venue	Opponent	Score	Result	Competition
1.	27 October 1973	Ergilio Hato Stadium, Willemstad, Netherlands Antilles	Netherlands Antilles	1–0	1–1	International friendly
2.	28 November 1976	Queen's Park Oval, Port of Spain, Trinidad and Tobago	Trinidad and Tobago	2–2	2–2	1978 FIFA World Cup qualification
3.	30 July 1978	André Kamperveen Stadion, Paramaribo, Suriname	Guyana	1–0	2–1	1978 CFU Championship
4.	30 March 1980	André Kamperveen Stadion, Paramaribo, Suriname	Costa Rica	2–2	2–3	1980 Summer Olympics qualification
5.	3 March 1985	Tiburcio Carías Andino, Tegucigalpa, Honduras	Honduras	1–0	1–1	1986 FIFA World Cup qualification

== Honours ==
=== Club ===
S.V. Robinhood

- SVB Hoofdklasse (9): 1975, 1976, 1979, 1980, 1981, 1983, 1984, 1985, 1986
- CONCACAF Champions' Cup Runners-up (4): 1976, 1977, 1982, 1983

=== International ===
Suriname

- CFU Championship (1): 1978

=== Individual ===
- Surinamese Footballer of the Year (2): 1974, 1983
