= Allan Wellman =

Guatemalan footballer

Personal information
- Full name: Allan Kenny Wellman
- Date of birth: 26 May 1954 (age 72)
- Place of birth: Guatemala
- Height: 1.67 m (5 ft 6 in)
- Position: Defender

Senior career*
Years	Team	Apps	(Gls)
1973–1986	Comunicaciones		
1986–1989	Aurora F.C.		
1989–1991	Comunicaciones		
1991	Aurora F.C.		

International career^{‡}
1976–1989	Guatemala	62	(1)
- * Club domestic league appearances and goals as of 4 April 2010 ‡ National team caps and goals as of 4 April 2010

Allan Kenny Wellman (born 26 May 1954) is a former Guatemalan football player.

== Club career ==
Wellmann played thirteen seasons for C.S.D. Comunicaciones, making his debut in 1973 at age 19, and five seasons with Aurora F.C. He became a club director of the Cremas after retiring from the game.

== International career ==
Wellmann made several appearances for the senior Guatemala national football team, including qualifying matches for the 1978, 1982 and 1990 FIFA World Cup.

He also played for Guatemala at the 1976 Summer Olympics in Montreal and the 1988 Summer Olympics in Seoul.
