= CSD Tipografía Nacional =

Association football club in Guatemala

Tipografía Nacional
- Full name: Club Social y Deportivo Tipografía Nacional
- Nicknames: Tip Nac; Los Tipógrafos (The Typographers); Los Impresores (The Printers)
- Short name: Tip Nac
- Founded: 24 January 1924; 101 years ago
- Ground: Estadio BRIO Fútbol
- Capacity: 200
- Manager: Carlos Ruiz
- League: Liga Tercera División de Guatemala
- 2014–15: 4th (Group A-5)
- Website: http://www.deportivotipografianacional.com
Home colours

Club Social y Deportivo Tipografía Nacional is a football club based in Guatemala City, Guatemala.

It was one of the most traditional teams in the country in the 20th Century, and it remains the fourth-most successful club in the history of Guatemalan football in terms of national titles won.

== History ==
Founded on 24 January 1924, Tipografía Nacional was the oldest team in the Liga Mayor / Liga Nacional, the nation's top division. The club was named after the national printing house, Tipografía Nacional.

Having entered the then Liga Capitalina in 1928, the team won three local titles between 1938 and 1940. Between 1937 and 1941, they had a streak of 51 matches scoring at least one goal. The team also won three official championships between 1943 and 1953. After Municipal won the first Liga Mayor championship in 1942, Tipografía won back-to-back titles in the 1943 and 1944–45 tournaments, being undefeated during the former, collecting eight wins and two draws. Tipografía and Municipal engaged in the first known rivalry in the league, which faded after Comunicaciones and Municipal became the two most dominant clubs and each other's arch-rival.

Tipografía also finished as league runner-up once, and won one domestic cup. In 1981, they finished at the bottom of the table, being relegated to the "B" division (now Primera División). They earned promotion back to the Liga Mayor after two seasons, but suffered relegation again in the 1992–93 season; due in good part to lack of financial support, the team continued descending to lower categories, until it was ultimately dissolved in 2002.

Its resurgence came up in 2012 as a result of acquiring Club Cahabón's franchise for Q75,000. Tip-Nac is, as of early 2013, a member of the Guatemalan Second Football Division.

Its uniform colours were red-and-white vertical striped shirt and blue shorts.

== Current technical staff ==
Position	Name
Manager	(Argentina) Carlos Ruiz

== Honours ==
- Liga Mayor (3):

1943, 1944–45, 1952–53

- Liga Capitalina (3):

1938, 1939, 1940

- Copa de Guatemala (1):

1954

== Positions in national tournaments ==
1927 Champion – Second Division, undefeated
1928 fifth place
1929 fifth place
1930 third place
1931 runner up
1932 third place
1934 third place
1935 fourth place
1936 third place
1937 runner up
1938 Champion
1939 Champion
1940 Champion
1941 runner up
1942 third place
1943 Champion – undefeated
1944 no tournament
1945 Champion
1946 no tournament
1947 fifth place
1948 Champion
1949 no tournament
1950–51 fourth place
1952–53 Champion
1954–55 fourth place
1956 seventh place
1957–58 seventh place
1959–60 fourth place
1961–62 sixth place
1963 sixth place
1964 tenth place
1965 fifth place
1966 seventh place
1967 eight place
1968 fifth place
1969 eight place
1970 eight place
1971 eight place
1972 fifth place
1973 fourth place

== Former coaches ==
- (Costa Rica) Roberto Calderón (1937–1944)
- (Guatemala) Joaquín Ortíz "Tacuazín" (1943–1945), (1953)
- (Spain) Lorenzo Ausina Tur (1968–1969)
- (Chile) Rolando Torino (1984–1985)
- (Guatemala) Palmiro Jonathan Salas Sandoval (1992–1994)
- (Guatemala) Carlos Alberto Mijangos (2004)
- (Guatemala) Haroldo Cordón
- (Guatemala) Felipe Antonio Carías (2012)
- (Guatemala) Carlos Ruiz (2014)
- (Guatemala) Javier Sinay (2014–2016)
- (Guatemala) Mario Tzic (2016)
