= Benjamín Monterroso =

Guatemalan footballer

Personal information
- Full name: Benjamín Eduardo Monterroso Díaz
- Date of birth: 1 September 1952 (age 74)
- Place of birth: Guatemala City, Guatemala
- Position: Midfielder

Senior career*
Years	Team	Apps	(Gls)
1970–1979	Municipal		
1980–1981	Juventud Retalteca		
1982–1986	Cobán Imperial		
1987	Comunicaciones		

International career
1971–1986	Guatemala		

Managerial career
- 1997–1998: Municipal
- 2003: Universidad
- 2004–2005: Jalapa
- 2005: Suchitepéquez
- 1998–1999: Guatemala
- 2008–2009: Guatemala
- 2010–2014: Unifut
Medal record
Men's football
Representing Guatemala
Pan American Games
Bronze medal – third place	1983 Caracas	Team
- * Club domestic league appearances and goals

Benjamín Eduardo ("Mincho") Monterroso Díaz (born 1 January 1952) is a Guatemalan professional football manager and former player who played as a midfielder. He was most recently the manager of the Guatemala women's national team.

== Playing career ==
Monterroso played for Municipal from 1970 to 1979, being part of the squad that won the IV CONCACAF Champions' Cup in 1974. He also played in the only Copa Interamericana final played by a Guatemalan team. After a 1–1 aggregate against Argentina's Independiente, Monterroso missed during the penalty shootout. Aside from the CONCACAF honors, Municipal won three league championships with Mincho, in 1973, 1974, and 1976. Monterroso scored 21 goals in all competitions for Municipal, and after a decade at the club, he played for the clubs Juventud Retalteca (1980 to 1981), Cobán Imperial (1982 to 1986) and Comunicaciones (1987).

He was a playing member of the Guatemala national team from 1971 to 1986, participating in two World Cup qualification processes, one Olympic tournament, and was a member of the Guatemalan team that won a bronze medal at the 1983 Pan American Games. During the 1974 World Cup qualification, Mincho played four matches, scoring one goal against Haiti. He then was part of the squad that qualified to the 1976 Olympic tournament, playing in all three of Guatemala's matches at the Olympic Games in Montreal. In 1976 and 1977, he played in eleven matches during the 1978 World Cup qualification process, scoring one goal against El Salvador.

== Coaching career ==
Monterroso coached the Guatemala national team from December 1998 to December 1999, during which time the team finished runner-up at the 1999 UNCAF Nations Cup. He coached the Olympic squad during part of the qualification campaign for the 2000 Olympic Games. He was named national team coach a second time from December 2003 to 2004, without coaching any official matches. Among the clubs Monterroso coached are Municipal (1997 to 1998, promoting eventual international forward Carlos Ruiz), Universidad de San Carlos (2003 Clausura), Deportivo Jalapa (2004 to 2005), and Suchitepéquez (2005).

In January 2007, he was appointed head coach of the Guatemala women's national football team, but in October 2008 he returned to coaching the men's national team, as the successor to Ramón Maradiaga. remaining in charge until 2009.

Monterroso became the manager of club Unifut in the women's top division of Guatemala in 2010, winning four consecutive league titles as of the end of 2011. His two daughters Coralia and María play for the club and are also members of the national women's team.

He was appointed coach of the Guatemala women's U-20 team on 6 February 2012.
