= Sammy Llewellyn =

Trinidad and Tobago footballer

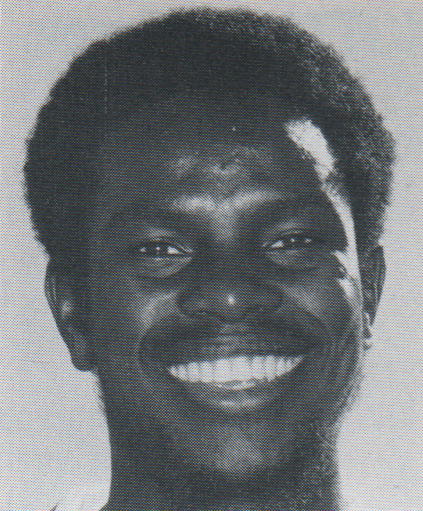
- Llewellyn in 1979

Personal information
- Date of birth: 24 December 1951 (age 74)
- Place of birth: Port of Spain, Trinidad and Tobago
- Height: 5 ft 8 in (1.73 m)
- Position: Forward

Senior career*
Years	Team	Apps	(Gls)
- Essex (T&T)
1979	Los Angeles Aztecs	4	(0)

International career
1972–76	Trinidad and Tobago	45	(35)
- * Club domestic league appearances and goals

Noel "Sammy" Llewellyn (born 24 December 1951) is a former Trinidad and Tobago international football player. He played as a forward.

He played most of his career in Trinidad and Tobago whilst working in the dock area of Port of Spain. In 1976, he was banned by the Trinidad and Tobago Football Federation for asking for financial compensation due to not being able to attend his work at the dock, and later being injured in the build up to a game. Llewellyn was on the Trinidad and Tobago team at the 1975 Pan American Games.
