= Javier Jiménez (Costa Rican footballer) =

Costa Rican footballer (born 1952)

Personal information
- Full name: Javier Jiménez Báez
- Date of birth: 1 August 1952 (age 74)
- Place of birth: Alajuela, Costa Rica
- Position: Winger

Senior career*
Years	Team	Apps	(Gls)
1972–1981	Alajuelense		
1978	→ Guanacasteca (loan)		
1982	Real España		
1982–1983	El Carmen de Alajuela		
1983–1984	Alajuelense		
1984–1985	Curridabat		

International career
1972–1980	Costa Rica	30	(8)
- * Club domestic league appearances and goals

Javier Jiménez Báez (born 1 August 1952 in Alajuela) is a retired Costa Rican football player.

== Club career ==
Nicknamed el Zurdo, Jiménez played 12 years for Alajuelense, making his senior debut in 1972. In 1978, he had a 4-month spell at Guanacasteca and in 1982 he had a stint abroad with Honduran side Real España. He returned to Costa Rica to play in the second division with El Carmen de Alajuela, then had another season at Alajuelense before retiring with Curridabat in 1985. He scored 120 goals in the Costa Rican leagues, 73 of them for Liga for whom he totalled 293 league matches.

== International career ==
Jiménez was capped by Costa Rica, playing 30 games and scoring 8 goals. He represented his country in 9 FIFA World Cup qualification matches. He scored a hattrick in an Olympic Games qualifier against Suriname in March 1980. Jiménez played for Costa Rica at the 1975 Pan American Games.

His final international was an October 1980 FIFA World Cup qualification match against Honduras.

== Personal life ==
After retiring, Jiménez worked in fashion trade. He has three children. One named Joshua Jiménez
