= David Cabrera (Salvadoran footballer) =

Salvadoran footballer (born 1949)

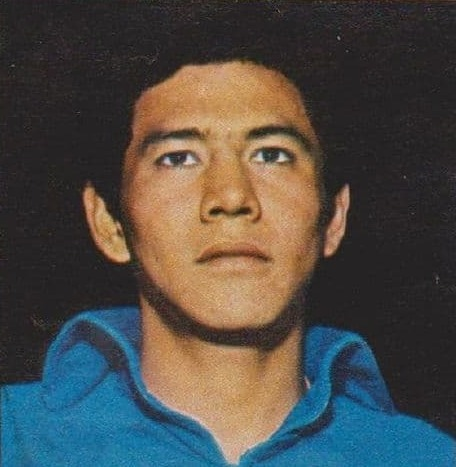
- Cabrera in 1970

Personal information
- Full name: David Arnoldo Cabrera Rivera
- Date of birth: September 12, 1945 (age 81)
- Place of birth: San Salvador, El Salvador
- Position: Forward

Senior career*
Years	Team	Apps	(Gls)
1966–1986	C.D. FAS	628	(242)

International career
	El Salvador	16	(2)
- * Club domestic league appearances and goals

David Arnoldo Cabrera Rivera (born September 12, 1945) is a retired football player from El Salvador.

== Club career ==
Cabrera is the alltime top goalscorer of Primera División side C.D. FAS, with 242 goals scored in a 20 years career with the club between the years 1966–1986. Although he won three Primera division titles (1972, 1981, 1983) his best season during his 20 years in the Primera Division was during the 1975–1976 season where he scored 25 goals and his best game performance was in FAS 7–2 victory against UES on January 3, 1980, where he scored six of the team seven goals.

== International career ==
Cabrera represented his country during the qualifiers for the 1978 FIFA World Cup in Argentina. He was included in the squad for the 1970 tournament but did not play.

== Honours ==
- FAS
  - Primera División (4): 1977–78, 1978–79, 1981, 1984
  - CONCACAF Champions' Cup (1): 1979

=== Individual ===
- Primera División Top Scorer (3): 1972 with 15 goals, 1981 with 20 goals and 1983 with 16 goals.
