= Raúl Isiordia =

Mexican footballer (born 1952)

Personal information
- Full name: Raúl Isiordia Ayón
- Date of birth: 22 December 1952 (age 73)
- Place of birth: Xalisco, Mexico
- Position: Midfielder

Senior career*
Years	Team	Apps	(Gls)
1971–1972	Coras de Tepic		
1972–1978	Atlético Español		
1978–1980	Monterrey	59	(10)
1980–1982	Tecos	63	(9)
1982–1983	Tigres	32	(10)
1983–1985	Deportivo Neza	59	(15)

International career
1977–1979	Mexico	12	(4)
- * Club domestic league appearances and goals

Raúl Isiordia Ayón (born 22 December 1952) is a Mexican former football forward who played for Mexico in the 1978 FIFA World Cup.

== Career ==
Born in Tepic, Isiordia began playing professional football with local side Coras de Tepic in the Segunda División de México. He later played in the Primera División with Atlético Español and C.F. Monterrey.

After he retired from playing, Isiordia became the president of his hometown club, Coras de Tepic, in the wake of its financial struggles from 1996 to 1999.
