= Javier Cárdenas (footballer) =

Mexican footballer (1952–2022)

Personal information
- Full name: Javier Cárdenas Martínez
- Date of birth: 8 December 1952
- Place of birth: San Rafael, Mexico City, Mexico
- Date of death: 25 June 2022 (aged 69)
- Position: Midfielder

Senior career*
Years	Team	Apps	(Gls)
1973–1978	Deportivo Toluca		
1978–1985	Guadalajara	215	(15)
1985–1986	Irapuato		

International career
1975–1979	Mexico	12	(2)
- * Club domestic league appearances and goals

Javier Cárdenas Martínez (8 December 1952 – 25 June 2022) was a Mexican football midfielder who played for Mexico in the 1978 FIFA World Cup. He also played for Deportivo Toluca.
