= Pierre Bayonne =

Haitian footballer (born 1949)

Personal information
- Full name: Pierre Bayonne
- Date of birth: 11 June 1949 (age 77)
- Place of birth: Haiti

International career
Years	Team	Apps	(Gls)
- Haiti

Pierre Bayonne (born 11 June 1949) is a retired Haitian footballer. Bayonne, formerly a member of Violette Athletic Club, competed with the Haiti national football team at the 1974 FIFA World Cup.
