= Silvio Aquino =

Salvadoran footballer (born 1949)

Personal information
- Full name: Silvio Romeo Aquino
- Date of birth: 30 June 1949 (age 77)
- Place of birth: Guazapa, El Salvador
- Height: 1.69 m (5 ft 7 in)
- Position: Midfielder

Senior career*
Years	Team	Apps	(Gls)
1976–1982	Alianza		

International career
1977–1983	El Salvador	10	(2)
- * Club domestic league appearances and goals

Silvio Romeo Aquino (born 30 June 1949) is a former football player from El Salvador who was one of the three non-playing members of his country's squad at the 1982 FIFA World Cup in Spain.

== International career ==
Aquino represented El Salvador in 5 FIFA World Cup qualification matches.
