= Sergio Rivera =

Guatemalan footballer

Personal information
- Full name: Sergio Estuardo Rivera Hernandez
- Date of birth: 28 November 1955 (age 70)
- Position: Midfielder

International career
Years	Team	Apps	(Gls)
1976-1989	Guatemala	46	(3)

Sergio Rivera (born 28 November 1955) is a Guatemalan former footballer. He competed in the men's tournament at the 1976 Summer Olympics.
