= Felix McDonald =

Guatemalan footballer

Personal information
- Date of birth: 26 June 1954 (age 72)
- Position: Midfielder

International career
Years	Team	Apps	(Gls)
1976-1989	Guatemala	29	(3)

Felix McDonald (born 26 June 1954) is a Guatemalan former footballer. He competed in the men's tournament at the 1976 Summer Olympics.
