= Football at the 1980 Summer Olympics – Men's team squads =

These are the squads for the countries that competed in Football at the 1980 Summer Olympics.

== Algeria ==
Head coach: Mahieddine Khalef

No.	Pos.	Player	DoB	Age	Caps	Club	Tournament games	Tournament goals	Minutes played	Sub off	Sub on	Cards yellow/red
1	GK	Mourad Amara	19 Feb 1959	21	0	(Algeria) JE Tizi-Ouzou	4	0	360	0	0	0
2	DF	Mahmoud Guendouz	24 Feb 1953	27	?	(Algeria) MA Hussein Dey	4	0	360	0	0	1Y
4	DF	Bouzid Mahyouz	13 Jan 1952	28	?	(Algeria) MP Alger	4	0	314	2	0	2Y
5	DF	Chaabane Merzekane	8 March 1959	21	?	(Algeria) MA Hussein Dey	4	1	349	1	0	1Y
6	DF	Mohamed Khedis	29 Feb 1952	28	?	(Algeria) MA Hussein Dey	3	0	270	0	0	0
7	FW	Rabah Madjer	15 Feb 1958	21	?	(Algeria) MA Hussein Dey	4	1	348	1	0	1Y
8	MD	Ali Fergani	21 Sep 1952	27	?	(Algeria) JE Tizi-Ouzou	4	0	360	0	0	1Y
9	FW	Tedj Bensaoula	1 Dec 1954	25	?	(Algeria) MP Oran	4	0	360	0	0	0
10	MD	Lakhdar Belloumi	29 Dec 1958	21	?	(Algeria) MP Alger	4	2	310	1	1	0
11	FW	Salah Assad	13 March 1958	22	?	(Algeria) RS Kouba	4	0	343	1	0	0
12	GK	Mohamed Rahmani	10 Dec 1958	21	?	(Algeria) EP Setif	0	0	0	0	0	0
13	DF	Salah Larbès	16 Sep 1952	27	?	(Algeria) JE Tizi-Ouzou	4	0	360	0	0	0
14	FW	Djamel Menad	22 Jul 1960	20	?	(Algeria) CM Belcourt	3	0	40	0	3	0
15	FW	M'hamed Bouhalla	29 Sep 1954	25	?	(Algeria) ASO Chlef	0	0	0	0	0	0
16	DF	Abderrahmane Derouaz	12 Dec 1955	24	?	(Algeria) USK Alger	3	0	108	0	2	0
17	MD	Hocine Yahi	25 Apr 1960	20	?	(Algeria) CM Belcourt	0	0	0	0	0	0
18	MD	Mohamed Ouamar Ghrib	24 Jan 1960	20	0	(Algeria) DNC Alger	1	0	90	0	0	0

== Colombia ==
Head coach: Eduardo Retat

No.	Pos.	Player	DoB	Age	Caps	Club	Tournament games	Tournament goals	Minutes played	Sub off	Sub on	Cards yellow/red
1	GK	Carlos Valencia	30 Dec 1953	26	?	(Colombia) Deportivo Cali	1	0	90	0	0	0
2	DF	Heberth González	31 May 1958	22	?	(Colombia) Deportes Quindío	3	0	270	0	0	0
3	DF	Astolfo Romero	15 Dec 1957	22	?	(Colombia) Deportes Quindío	3	0	270	0	0	1Y
4	DF	Henry Viáfara	20 Apr 1953	27	?	(Colombia) Deportivo Pereira	3	0	270	0	0	1Y
5	DF	Israel Viloria	13 Nov 1954	25	?	(Colombia) Deportes Quindío	2	0	138	0	1	0
6	FW	Gilberto García	15 Jul 1959	20	?	(Colombia) América de Cali	3	0	270	0	0	1Y
7	DF	Jorge Porras	25 Dec 1959	20	?	(Colombia) Atlético Nacional	3	0	270	0	0	0
8	FW	Norberto Peluffo	26 May 1958	22	?	(Colombia) Atlético Nacional	3	0	101	2	1	0
9	MD	Pedro Sarmiento	26 Oct 1956	24	?	(Colombia) Atlético Nacional	3	0	270	0	0	0
10	MD	José Hernandez	18 May 1956	24	?	(Colombia) Deportivo Pereira	1	0	90	0	0	0
11	FW	Benjamin Cardona	17 Jul 1957	22	?	(Colombia) Deportivo Pereira	3	1	269	1	0	1Y
12	GK	Heberth Ríos	28 Sep 1956	23	?	(Colombia) Once Caldas	2	0	180	0	0	0
13	MD	Alexis García	21 Jul 1960	19	?	(Colombia) Once Caldas	3	0	132	1	2	0
14	MD	Fernando Fiorillo	23 Nov 1956	23	?	(Colombia) Atlético Junior	2	0	156	0	1	0
15	FW	Carlos Molinares	23 Jun 1956	24	?	(Colombia) Atlético Junior	2	1	111	0	1	0
16	FW	Luis Pérez	12 Sep 1957	20	?	(Colombia) Unión Magdalena	1	0	59	1	0	0
17	MD	Radamel García	16 Apr 1957	23	?	(Colombia) Independiente Santa Fe	1	0	24	1	0	0

== Costa Rica ==
Head coach: (Spain) Antonio Moyano

No.	Pos.	Player	DoB	Age	Caps	Club	Tournament games	Tournament goals	Minutes played	Sub off	Sub on	Cards yellow/red
1	GK	Julio Morales	23 May 1957	23	?	(Costa Rica) C.S. Cartaginés	3	0	270	0	0	0
2	DF	Javier Masís	16 April 1953	27	?	(Costa Rica) Deportivo Saprissa	3	0	249	1	0	0
3	DF	Ricardo García	31 Jul 1955	24	?	(Costa Rica) Puntarenas	3	0	270	0	0	0
4	DF	Carlos Toppings	7 Apr 1953	27	?	(Costa Rica) Puntarenas	3	0	270	0	0	0
5	DF	Carlos Jiménez	27 Jun 1954	26	?	(Costa Rica) C.S. Cartaginés	1	0	14	1	0	0
6	DF	Dennis Marshall	18 Dec 1959	20	?	(Costa Rica) ML Limón	2	0	52	0	2	0
7	MD	Francisco Hernández	11 Jul 1949	31	?	(Costa Rica) Deportivo Saprissa	3	0	270	0	0	0
8	MD	Tomás Velásquez	16 Dec 1957	22	?	(Costa Rica) Puntarenas	3	0	270	0	0	0
9	FW	Jorge White	12 Nov 1957	22	?	(Costa Rica) LD Alajuelense	3	1	270	0	0	0
10	MD	Róger Alvarez	13 Nov 1952	27	?	(Costa Rica) Herediano	3	0	160	3	0	0
11	FW	Marvin Obando	4 Apr 1960	20	?	(Costa Rica) Herediano	3	0	270	0	0	0
12	DF	Minor Alpízar	27 Sep 1959	20	?	(Costa Rica) Ramonense	2	0	166	0	1	0
13	MD	William Avila	27 Oct 1956	23	?	(Costa Rica) San Carlos	1	0	30	0	1	0
14	FW	Omar Arroyo	22 May 1955	25	?	(Costa Rica) Alajuelense	3	1	270	0	0	0
15	FW	Luis Fernández	2 Apr 1953	20	?	(Costa Rica) Deportivo Saprissa	1	0	59	1	0	0
16	MD	Herberth Quesada	28 Sep 1959	20	?	(Costa Rica) C.S. Cartaginés	2	0	80	0	2	0
17	GK	Carlos Bismark Duarte			?	(Costa Rica) Puntarenas	0	0	0	0	0	0

== Cuba ==
Head coach: (Hungary) Tibor Ivanics

No.	Pos.	Player	DoB	Age	Caps	Club	Tournament games	Tournament goals	Minutes played	Sub off	Sub on	Cards yellow/red
1	GK	José Francisco Reinoso	20 May 1950	30	?	(Cuba) Villa Clara	0	0	0	0	0	0
2	DF	Miguel López	Sept 24, 1949	30	?	(Cuba) Ciudad de La Habana	3	0	236	1	1	0
3	DF	Raimundo Frometa	15 Jun 1955	25	?	Santiago de Cuba	1	0	10	0	1	0
4	DF	Luis Sánchez	23 Feb 1952	28	?	(Cuba) Ciudad de La Habana	4	0	360	0	0	1Y
5	DF	Luis Dreke	9 Jul 1953	27	?	(Cuba) Matanzas	4	0	360	0	0	1Y
6	MD	Roberto Espinoza	8 Oct 1959	20	?	(Cuba) Cienfuegos	2	0	100	0	1	1Y
7	MD	Andrés Roldán	28 Feb 1950	30	?	(Cuba) Cienfuegos	4	1	360	1	0	0
8	MD	Amado Povea	30 Apr 1955	25	?	(Cuba) Pinar del Río	4	0	189	0	2	0
9	MD	Dagoberto Lara	16 Apr 1952	28	?	(Cuba) Cienfuegos	4	0	360	0	0	0
10	FW	Ramón Núñez	19 Apr 1953	27	?	(Cuba) Las Tunas	4	1	360	0	0	0
11	MD	Luis Hernández	23 Jun 1959	21	?	(Cuba) Ciudad de La Habana	3	1	197	1	1	0
12	GK	Calixto Martínez	14 Oct 1952	27	?	(Cuba) Pinar del Río	0	0	0	0	0	0
13	FW	Roberto Pereira	Sept 23, 1952	27	?	(Cuba) Villa Clara	2	0	144	2	0	0
14	MD	Regino Delgado	Sept 7, 1956	23	?	(Cuba) Villa Clara	3	0	270	0	0	2Y
15	FW	Jorge Massó	16 Feb 1950	30	?	(Cuba) Ciudad de La Habana	4	0	294	1	0	0
16	GK	Hugo Madera	24 Nov 1951	28	?	(Cuba) Camagüey	4	0	360	0	0	0
17	FW	Carlos Loredo	14 Oct 1951	28	?	(Cuba) Ciudad de La Habana	4	0	360	0	0	1Y

Due to the boycott of the Olympics, Cuba took part in place of the US.

== Czechoslovakia ==
Head coach: František Havránek

No.	Pos.	Player	DoB	Age	Caps	Club	Tournament games	Tournament goals	Minutes played	Sub off	Sub on	Cards yellow/red
1	GK	Stanislav Seman	6 August 1952	27	2	(Czechoslovakia) Lokomotiva Košice	6	0	540	0	0	0
2	DF	Luděk Macela	3 October 1950	29	0	(Czechoslovakia) Dukla Prague	5	0	450	0	0	1Y
3	DF	Josef Mazura	23 April 1956	24	0	(Czechoslovakia) Zbrojovka Brno	5	0	450	0	0	0
4	DF	Libor Radimec	22 May 1950	30	1	(Czechoslovakia) Baník Ostrava	6	0	540	0	0	1Y
5	DF	Zdeněk Rygel	1 March 1951	29	4	(Czechoslovakia) Baník Ostrava	2	0	180	0	0	0
6	MD	Petr Němec	7 June 1957	23	0	(Czechoslovakia) Baník Ostrava	3	0	135	0	2	1Y
7	FW	Ladislav Vízek	22 January 1955	25	19	(Czechoslovakia) Dukla Prague	6	4	540	0	0	1Y
8	MD	Jan Berger	27 November 1955	24	2	(Czechoslovakia) Sparta Prague	6	1	540	0	0	1Y,1R
9	FW	Jindřich Svoboda	14 September 1952	27	2	(Czechoslovakia) Zbrojovka Brno	4	1	134	0	3	0
10	MD	Lubomír Pokluda	17 March 1958	22	0	(Czechoslovakia) RH Cheb	6	2	473	3	0	2Y
11	FW	Werner Lička	15 September 1954	25	4	(Czechoslovakia) Baník Ostrava	6	1	471	4	0	0
12	MD	Rostislav Václavíček	7 December 1946	33	26	(Czechoslovakia) Zbrojovka Brno	2	0	115	0	1	0
13	GK	Jaroslav Netolička	3 March 1954	26	14	(Czechoslovakia) Dukla Prague	0	0	0	0	0	0
14	MD	Oldřich Rott	26 May 1951	29	3	(Czechoslovakia) Dukla Prague	5	0	540	0	0	1Y
15	MD	Zdeněk Šreiner	2 June 1954	26	0	(Czechoslovakia) Baník Ostrava	3	1	270	0	0	0
16	MD	František Štambachr	13 January 1953	27	17	(Czechoslovakia) Dukla Prague	4	0	292	0	1	0
17	DF	František Kunzo	17 September 1954	25	0	(Czechoslovakia) FK Dukla Banská Bystrica	4	0	360	0	0	1Y

== East Germany ==
Head coach: Rudolf Krause

No.	Pos.	Player	DoB	Age	Caps	Club	Tournament games	Tournament goals	Minutes played	Sub off	Sub on	Cards yellow/red
1	GK	Bodo Rudwaleit	3 August 1957	22	5	(East Germany) BFC Dynamo	5	0	450	0	0	0
2	DF	Artur Ullrich	10 October 1957	22	1	(East Germany) BFC Dynamo	4	0	360	0	0	0
3	DF	Lothar Hause	22 October 1955	24	2	(East Germany) FC Vorwärts Frankfurt	6	1	531	1	0	1Y
4	DF	Frank Uhlig	8 December 1955	24	1	(East Germany) FC Karl-Marx-Stadt	2	0	97	0	1	0
5	DF	Frank Baum	30 January 1956	24	4	(East Germany) 1. FC Lokomotive Leipzig	5	0	443	1	0	1Y
6	MD	Rüdiger Schnuphase	23 January 1954	26	20	(East Germany) FC Carl Zeiss Jena	6	1	540	1	0	0
7	MD	Frank Terletzki	5 August 1950	29	4	(East Germany) BFC Dynamo	6	3	514	2	0	1Y
8	MD	Wolfgang Steinbach	21 September 1954	25	4	(East Germany) 1. FC Magdeburg	6	1	495	1	0	2Y/1R
9	MD	Jürgen Bähringer	19 August 1950	29	0	(East Germany) FC Karl-Marx-Stadt	4	0	319	2	0	1Y
10	FW	Werner Peter	25 March 1950	30	9	(East Germany) HFC Chemie	4	1	163	0	3	0
11	FW	Dieter Kühn	4 July 1956	23	7	(East Germany) 1. FC Lokomotive Leipzig	6	1	376	3	0	0
12	DF	Norbert Trieloff	24 August 1957	22	0	(East Germany) BFC Dynamo	6	0	540	0	0	0
13	DF	Matthias Müller	18 October 1954	25	1	(East Germany) SG Dynamo Dresden	4	0	360	0	0	0
14	MD	Matthias Liebers	22 November 1958	21	0	(East Germany) 1. FC Lokomotive Leipzig	6	0	83	0	6	0
15	MF	Andreas Trautmann	21 May 1959	21	0	(East Germany) SG Dynamo Dresden	1	0	45	0	1	0
16	GK	Bernd Jakubowski	10 December 1952	27	0	(East Germany) SG Dynamo Dresden	1	0	90	0	0	0
17	FW	Wolf-Rüdiger Netz	15 December 1950	29	1	(East Germany) BFC Dynamo	5	4	450	0	0	0

== Finland ==
Head coach: Jukka Vakkila

No.	Pos.	Player	DoB	Age	Caps	Club	Tournament games	Tournament goals	Minutes played	Sub off	Sub on	Cards yellow/red
1	GK	Olli Isoaho	2 March 1956	24	1	(Finland) HJK	3	0	270	0	0	0
2	DF	Aki Lahtinen	31 October 1958	21	3	(Finland) OPS	3	0	270	0	0	0
3	DF	Juha Helin	4 January 1954	26	13	(Finland) RoPS	3	0	270	0	0	0
4	DF	Kari Virtanen	15 September 1958	21	6	(Sweden) IFK Eskilstuna	3	0	270	0	0	0
5	DF	Ari Heikkinen	8 April 1957	23	2	(Finland) OPS	1	0	63	1	0	0
6	MD	Hannu Turunen	24 June 1956	24	5	(Finland) KPT	3	0	270	0	0	0
7	MD	Juha Dahllund	20 March 1954	26	3	(Finland) HJK	3	0	243	1	0	0
8	MD	Vesa Pulliainen	8 May 1957	23	1	(Finland) KTP	3	0	270	0	0	0
9	FW	Juhani Himanka	19 April 1956	24	5	(Finland) OPS	3	0	241	1	0	0
10	FW	Ari Tissari	24 March 1951	29	1	(Finland) KTP	3	1	192	2	0	0
11	FW	Jouko Alila	18 November 1950	29	1	(Finland) KTP	3	1	254	1	0	0
12	GK	Jouko Kataja	4 June 1953	27	0	(Finland) KTP	0	0	0	0	0	0
13	DF	Teuvo Vilen	26 November 1953	26	6	(Finland) FC Haka	3	0	207	0	1	0
14	DF	Raimo Kuuluvainen	23 April 1954	26	1	(Finland) Ilves	1	0	27	0	1	0
15	MD	Tomi Jalo	22 October 1958	21	1	(Finland) TPS	1	0	16	0	1	0
16	FW	Jouko Soini	2 March 1956	24	1	(Finland) HJK	2	1	95	0	2	0
17	MD	Juha Rissanen	13 November 1958	26	0	(Finland) KPT	1	0	12	0	1	0

Due to the boycott of the Olympics, Finland took part in place of Norway.

== Iraq ==
Head coach: (Iraq) Anwar Jassam

No.	Pos.	Player	DoB	Age	Caps	Club	Tournament games	Tournament goals	Minutes played	Sub off	Sub on	Cards yellow/red
1	GK	Fatah Nsaief	2 February 1951	29	?	(Iraq) Al-Jaish	4	0	0	0	0	0
2	DF	Adnan Dirjal	26 January 1960	20	?	(Iraq) Al-Zawraa	4	0	0	0	0	0
3	DF	Jamal Ali	28 June 1956	24	?	(Iraq) Al-Talaba	4	0	0	0	0	0
4	MF	Saad Jassim	4 August 1959	20	?	(Iraq) Al-Jaish	1	0	0	0	0	0
5	DF	Hassan Farhan	29 June 1953	27	?	(Iraq) Al-Jaish	4	0	0	0	0	0
6	MF	Alaa Ahmad	25 May 1952	28	?	(Iraq) Al-Minaa	4	0	0	0	0	0
7	MF	Adel Khudhair	1 July 1954	26	?	(Iraq) Al-Zawraa	4	0	0	0	0	0
8	FW	Falah Hassan	1 July 1951	29	?	(Iraq) Al-Zawraa	4	2	0	0	0	0
9	MF	Hadi Ahmed	1 Nov 1951	28	?	(Iraq) Al-Minaa	4	1	0	0	0	0
10	FW	Hussein Saeed	21 January 1958	22	?	(Iraq) Al-Talaba	3	1	0	0	0	0
11	FW	Thamir Yousif	1 July 1953	27	?	(Iraq) Al-Zawraa	1	0	0	0	0	0
12	DF	Ibrahim Ali	1 July 1950	30	?	(Iraq) Al-Zawraa	4	0	0	0	0	0
13	DF	Wathiq Aswad	1 July 1957	23	?	(Iraq) Al-Talaba	1	0	0	0	0	0
14	FW	Nazar Ashraf	2 November 1953	26	?	(Iraq) Al-Talaba	4	0	0	0	0	0
15	FW	Ali Kadhim	1 January 1949	31	?	(Iraq) Al-Zawraa	4	0	0	0	0	0
16	MF	Abdelilah Abdul-Wahid	1 July 1956	24	?	(Iraq) Al-Zawraa	0	0	0	0	0	0
17	GK	Kadim Shibib	1 July 1952	28	?	(Iraq) Al-Tayaran	1	0	0	0	0	0

Due to the boycott of the Olympics, Iraq took part in place of Malaysia.

== Kuwait ==
Head coach: (Brazil) Carlos Alberto Parreira

No.	Pos.	Player	DoB	Age	Caps	Club	Tournament games	Tournament goals	Minutes played	Sub off	Sub on	Cards yellow/red
1	GK	Ahmed Al-Tarabulsi	22 March 1947	33	?	Kuwait SC	4	0	360	0	0	0
2	DF	Naeem Saad	1 October 1957	23	?	(Kuwait) Al Tadamon	3	0	225	0	1	0
3	DF	Mahboub Juma'a	17 September 1955	24	?	(Kuwait) Al Salmiya	3	0	270	0	0	1Y
4	DF	Jamal Al-Qabendi	17 April 1959	21	?	(Kuwait) Kazma	3	0	270	0	0	0
5	DF	Waleed Al-Jasem	18 November 1959	20	?	Kuwait SC	4	0	331	1	0	0
6	MD	Saad Al-Houti	24 May 1954	26	?	Kuwait SC	4	0	360	0	0	1Y
7	FW	Fathi Kamel	23 May 1955	25	?	(Kuwait) Al Tadamon	3	0	270	0	0	1Y
8	MD	Abdullah Al-Buloushi	16 February 1960	20	?	(Kuwait) Al Arabi	3	0	225	1	0	0
9	FW	Jasem Yaqoub	25 October 1953	26	?	(Kuwait) Al Qadisiya	4	2	356	1	0	1Y
10	MF	Muayad Al-Haddad	3 March 1960	20	?	(Kuwait) Khaitan	1	0	4	0	1	0
11	MF	Hamad Bouhamad	1952	28	?	(Kuwait) Al Qadisiya	4	0	360	0	0	0
12	MD	Yussef Al-Suwayed	20 September 1958	21	?	(Kuwait) Kazma	2	0	68	0	2	0
13	MD	Ahmad Askar	1961	19	?	(Kuwait) Al Arabi	1	0	45	1	0	0
14	DF	Hamoud Al-Shemmari	26 September 1960	19	?	(Kuwait) Kazma	4	0	337	1	0	1Y
15	DF	Sami Al-Hashash	15 September 1959	20	?	(Kuwait) Al Arabi	2	0	119	0	1	0
16	FW	Faisal Al-Dakhil	13 August 1957	22	?	(Kuwait) Al Qadisiya	4	3	360	0	0	0
20	GK	Abdulnabi Al-Khaldi	1951	29	?	(Kuwait) Al Arabi	0	0	0	0	0	0

== Nigeria ==
Head coach: (Brazil) Otto Glória

No.	Pos.	Player	DoB	Age	Caps	Club	Tournament games	Tournament goals	Minutes played	Sub off	Sub on	Cards yellow/red
1	GK	Best Ogedegbe	3 September 1954	24	?	(Nigeria) Shooting Stars	3	0	270	0	0	0
2	GK	Moses Effiong	4 October 1959	20	?	(Nigeria) Shooting Stars	0	0	0	0	0	0
3	DF	David Adiele	5 February 1955	25	?	(Nigeria) Bendel Insurance	1	0	90	0	0	0
4	DF	Sylvanus Okpala	5 May 1961	19	?	(Nigeria) Enugu Rangers	3	0	270	0	0	1Y
5	DF	Leotis Boateng	8 March 1951	29	?	(Nigeria) Enugu Rangers	3	0	270	0	0	1Y
6	DF	John Orlando	15 October 1960	19	?	(Nigeria) Shooting Stars	3	0	251	0	1	0
7	DF	Tunde Bamidele	13 May 1953	27	?	(Nigeria) Shooting Stars	3	0	270	0	0	0
8	MD	Isima Okey	24 August 1956	23	?	(Nigeria) Enugu Rangers	1	0	19	1	0	0
9	FW	Shefiu Mohamed	20 May 1956	24	?	(Nigeria) Racca Rovers	3	0	225	0	1	0
10	MD	Alloysius Atuegbu	29 April 1953	27	?	(Nigeria) Enugu Rangers	3	0	180	1	1	0
11	FW	Henry Nwosu	17 August 1961	18	?	New Nigeria Bank	2	1	180	0	0	1Y
12	MD	Felix Owolabi	24 January 1956	24	?	(Nigeria) Shooting Stars	1	0	90	0	0	0
13	FW	Segun Odegbami	27 August 1952	27	?	(Nigeria) Shooting Stars	1	0	45	1	0	0
14	MD	Mudashiru Lawal	8 June 1954	26	?	(Nigeria) Shooting Stars	3	0	225	0	1	0
15	FW	Adokiye Amiesimaka	23 November 1956	23	?	(Nigeria) Enugu Rangers	2	0	180	0	0	0
16	FW	Emmanuel Osuigwe	6 April 1952	28	?	(Nigeria) Enugu Rangers	3	0	270	0	0	2Y
17	MD	Kadiri Ikhana	31 December 1951	29	?	(Nigeria) Bendel Insurance	1	0	45	1	0	0

Due to the boycott of the Olympics, Nigeria took part in place of Ghana.

== Spain ==
Head coach: José Santamaría

No.	Pos.	Player	DoB	Age	Caps	Club	Tournament games	Tournament goals	Minutes played	Sub off	Sub on	Cards yellow/red
1	MD	Joaquín Alonso	9 June 1956	24	1	(Spain) Sporting de Gijón	3	0	270	0	0	0
2	MD	Marcos Alonso	1 October 1959	20	0	(Spain) Atlético Madrid	3	1	270	1	0	1Y
3	GK	Francisco Buyo	13 January 1958	22	0	(Spain) Deportivo La Coruña	2	0	180	0	0	0
4	MD	Miguel De Andrés	8 October 1957	22	0	(Spain) Athletic Bilbao	3	0	270	0	0	0
5	DF	Juanito	24 August 1961	18	0	(Spain) Real Madrid Castilla	1	0	24	0	1	0
6	DF	Agustín Gajate	3 March 1958	22	0	(Spain) Real Sociedad	3	0	270	0	0	0
7	FW	Ángel González	3 December 1958	21	0	(Spain) Espanyol	3	0	237	2	0	0
8	MD	Francisco Güerri	13 April 1959	21	0	(Spain) Real Zaragoza	1	0	16	0	1	0
9	MD	David López	23 April 1956	24	0	(Spain) Sporting de Gijón	3	0	254	1	0	1Y
10	MD	Víctor Muñoz	15 March 1957	23	0	(Spain) Real Zaragoza	3	0	270	0	0	0
11	DF	Urbano Ortega	22 December 1961	18	0	(Spain) Espanyol	3	0	69	0	3	0
12	DF	José Manuel Espinosa	28 July 1959	21	0	(Spain) Real Madrid Castilla	0	0	0	0	0	0
13	DF	Quique Ramos	7 March 1956	23	0	(Spain) Atlético Madrid	3	0	246	1	0	0
14	FW	Hipólito Rincón	28 April 1957	23	0	(Spain) Real Madrid	3	1	245	1	0	1Y
15	GK	Agustín Rodríguez	10 September 1959	20	0	(Spain) Real Madrid Castilla	1	0	90	0	0	0
16	DF	Santiago Urquiaga	18 April 1958	22	1	(Spain) Athletic Bilbao	3	0	270	0	0	1Y
17	MD	Manuel Zúñiga	29 June 1960	20	0	(Spain) Espanyol	1	0	9	0	1	0

== Syria ==
Head coach: Yousef Chadli

No.	Pos.	Player	DoB	Age	Caps	Club	Tournament games	Tournament goals	Minutes played	Sub off	Sub on	Cards yellow/red
1	GK	Ahmed Eid Maher Beirakdar	1 May 1955	25	?	(Syria) Al-Karamah SC	3	0	270	0	0	1Y
2	DF	Ahmed Jihad Chit	6 August 1954	25	?	(Syria) Al-Ittihad SC	3	0	270	0	0	1Y
3	DF	Mohammed Dahman	1 January 1959	21	?	(Syria) Al-Jaish SC	3	0	270	0	0	1Y
4	DF	Riyadh Mohammed Asfahani	13 March 1952	28	?	(Syria) Al-Shorta SC	2	0	180	0	0	1Y
5	DF	Ibrahim Mahallame	7 March 1949	31	?	(Syria) Al-Jaish SC	3	0	270	0	0	0
6	MD	Abdul Fattah Haona	23 February 1954	26	?	(Syria) Al-Jaish SC	3	0	270	0	0	0
7	MD	Mohamed Jazaeri	18 February 1958	22	?	(Syria) Al-Jaish SC	2	0	180	0	0	0
8	MD	Anouar Abdul Kader	11 January 1953	27	?	(Syria) Al-Shorta SC	3	0	260	1	0	0
9	MD	Kevork Mardikian	14 July 1954	25	?	(Syria) Al-Jaish SC	3	0	270	0	0	0
10	FW	Aleiane Omar Hojeir	15 March 1954	26	?		3	0	225	1	0	0
11	FW	Marwan Madarati	18 March 1959	21	?	(Syria) Al-Jaish SC	2	0	180	0	0	0
12	DF	Hachem Chalabi	18 May 1957	23	?	(Syria) Al-Shorta SC	0	0	0	0	0	0
13	FW	Ahmed Haouache	14 March 1960	20	?	(Syria) Al-Ittihad SC	2	0	100	0	1	0
15	MD	Fouad Aref	5 August 1954	25	?	(Syria) Al-Shorta SC	1	0	45	0	1	0
16	FW	Elia Nabil Shana	2 March 1958	22	?		2	0	103	1	1	0
17	GK	Bassam Jarayhi	6 March 1956	24	?	(Syria) Al-Shorta SC	0	0	0	0	0	0
21	DF	Samer Zuhair Assassa	5 May 1960	20	?	(Syria) Al-Shorta SC	2	0	21	1	1	0

Due to the boycott of the Olympics, Syria took part in place of Iran.

== Venezuela ==
Head coach: Manuel Plasencia

No.	Pos.	Player	DoB	Age	Caps	Club	Tournament games	Tournament goals	Minutes played	Sub off	Sub on	Cards yellow/red
1	GK	Eustorgio Sánchez	23 January 1959	21	?	(Venezuela) Deportivo Italia	3	0	270	0	0	1Y
2	DF	Ordan Aguirre	15 February 1955	25	?	(Venezuela) Deportivo Lara	3	0	195	0	1	0
3	DF	Emilio Campos	22 August 1954	25	?	(Venezuela) ULA	3	0	270	0	0	0
4	DF	Pedro Acosta	28 November 1959	20	?	(Venezuela) Deportivo Galicia	3	0	270	0	0	0
5	DF	Mauro Cichero	16 October 1951	28	?	(Venezuela) Unión Deportiva Canarias	1	0	56	1	0	0
6	MF	Robert Elie	11 May 1959	21	?	(Venezuela) ULA	3	1	270	0	0	0
7	FW	Alexis Peña	1 July 1956	22	?	(Venezuela) ULA	2	0	130	2	0	0
8	MF	Asdrúbal Sánchez	1 April 1958	22	?	(Venezuela) ULA	3	0	234	1	0	0
9	FW	Iker Zubizarreta	18 May 1962	18	?	(Venezuela) Loyola S.C.	2	2	180	0	0	0
10	MF	Bernardo Añor	7 October 1959	20	?	(Venezuela) Bingo	3	0	250	1	0	0
11	FW	Angel de Jesús	18 April 1957	18	?	(Venezuela) Valencia	3	0	86	0	3	0
12	GK	César Semidey	3 October 1954	25	?	(Venezuela) Deportivo Táchira	0	0	0	0	0	0
13	FW	Rodolfo Carvajal	8 February 1952	28	?	(Venezuela) ULA	3	0	270	0	0	0
14	MF	Fernando Pereira	22 October 1959	20	?	(Venezuela) CD Central Madeirense	1	0	75	1	0	0
15	FW	Pedro Febles	18 April 1959	21	?	(Venezuela) Deportivo Italia	1	0	20	0	1	1Y
16	FW	Nelson Carrero	3 February 1958	22	?	(Venezuela) ULA	3	0	214	0	1	0
17	DF	Juan José Vidal	29 May 1959	21	?	(Venezuela) Deportivo Italia	2	0	180	0	0	0

Due to the boycott of the Olympics, Venezuela took part in place of Argentina.

== Soviet Union ==
Head coach: Konstantin Beskov

No.	Pos.	Player	DoB	Age	Caps	Club	Tournament games	Tournament goals	Minutes played	Sub off	Sub on	Cards yellow/red
1	GK	Rinat Dasaev	13 June 1957	22	7	(Soviet Union) Spartak Moscow	6	0	514	1	0	0
2	DF	Tengiz Sulakvelidze	27 July 1956	23	4	(Soviet Union) Dynamo Tbilisi	6	0	540	0	0	1Y
3	DF	Aleksandr Chivadze	8 April 1955	25	4	(Soviet Union) Dynamo Tbilisi	6	0	540	0	0	1Y
4	DF	Vagiz Khidiyatullin	3 March 1959	21	21	(Soviet Union) Spartak Moscow	6	0	540	0	0	0
5	DF	Oleg Romantsev	4 January 1954	26	5	(Soviet Union) Spartak Moscow	6	1	540	0	0	2Y
6	MD	Sergei Shavlo	4 September 1956	23	10	(Soviet Union) Spartak Moscow	5	1	450	0	0	0
7	MD	Sergei Andreev	17 May 1956	24	7	(Soviet Union) SKA Rostov-on-Don	6	5	540	0	0	0
8	MD	Volodymyr Bezsonov	5 March 1958	22	24	(Soviet Union) Dynamo Kiev	6	1	540	0	0	0
9	FW	Yuri Gavrilov	3 May 1953	27	15	(Soviet Union) Spartak Moscow	5	3	387	2	0	0
10	FW	Fedor Cherenkov	25 July 1959	20	6	(Soviet Union) Spartak Moscow	6	4	432	2	1	0
11	FW	Valery Gazzaev	8 August 1954	25	7	(Soviet Union) Dynamo Moscow	6	0	372	2	1	0
12	GK	Vladimir Pilguy	26 January 1948	32	12	(Soviet Union) Dynamo Moscow	1	0	26	0	1	0
13	DF	Sergei Baltacha	3 March 1958	22	1	(Soviet Union) Dynamo Kiev	2	0	108	0	1	0
14	DF	Sergei Nikulin	1 January 1951	29	3	(Soviet Union) Dynamo Moscow	1	0	45	0	1	0
15	MD	Khoren Hovhannisyan	10 January 1955	25	7	(Soviet Union) Ararat Yerevan	3	2	143	0	3	0
16	MD	Aleksandr Prokopenko	16 November 1953	26	1	(Soviet Union) Dinamo Minsk	2	0	117	0	1	0
17	FW	Revaz Chelebadze	2 October 1955	24	7	(Soviet Union) Dynamo Tbilisi	2	0	108	2	0	0

== Yugoslavia ==
Head coach: Ivan Toplak

No.	Pos.	Player	DoB	Age	Caps	Club	Tournament games	Tournament goals	Minutes played	Sub off	Sub on	Cards yellow/red
1	GK	Dragan Pantelić	9 December 1951	28	5	(Socialist Federal Republic of Yugoslavia) Radnički Niš	4	0	360	0	0	0
2	DF	Nikica Cukrov	6 March 1954	26	13	(Socialist Federal Republic of Yugoslavia) Hajduk Split	6	0	456	1	1	0
3	MD	Ivan Gudelj	21 September 1960	19	0	(Socialist Federal Republic of Yugoslavia) Hajduk Split	2	0	99	0	1	0
4	DF	Miloš Hrstić	20 November 1955	24	3	(Socialist Federal Republic of Yugoslavia) NK Rijeka	4	0	285	0	1	1Y
5	DF	Milan Jovin	13 December 1955	24	2	(Socialist Federal Republic of Yugoslavia) Red Star Belgrade	2	0	165	1	0	0
6	DF	Nikica Klinčarski	5 January 1957	23	3	(Socialist Federal Republic of Yugoslavia) Partizan Belgrade	6	0	540	0	0	0
7	DF	Mišo Krstičević	19 February 1958	22	6	(Socialist Federal Republic of Yugoslavia) Hajduk Split	4	0	197	1	2	0
8	DF	Dževad Šećerbegović	15 July 1955	25	5	(Socialist Federal Republic of Yugoslavia) Sloboda Tuzla	4	1	315	0	1	0
9	MD	Vladimir Matijević	2 January 1957	23	2	(Socialist Federal Republic of Yugoslavia) Velež Mostar	5	0	450	0	0	1Y
10	MD	Ante Miročević	6 August 1952	27	6	(Socialist Federal Republic of Yugoslavia) Budućnost Titograd	4	1	284	3	0	1Y
11	MD	Dušan Pešić	26 April 1955	25	1	(Socialist Federal Republic of Yugoslavia) FK Napredak	3	0	180	2	0	0
12	GK	Tomislav Ivković	11 August 1960	19	0	(Socialist Federal Republic of Yugoslavia) Dinamo Zagreb	2	0	180	0	0	0
13	MD	Boro Primorac	5 December 1954	25	11	(Socialist Federal Republic of Yugoslavia) Velež Mostar	6	1	540	0	0	0
14	FW	Srebrenko Repčić	1 December 1954	25	1	(Socialist Federal Republic of Yugoslavia) FK Sarajevo	6	0	417	0	2	0
15	MD	Miloš Šestić	8 August 1956	23	4	(Socialist Federal Republic of Yugoslavia) Red Star Belgrade	6	2	482	1	1	0
16	FW	Zlatko Vujović	26 August 1958	21	7	(Socialist Federal Republic of Yugoslavia) Hajduk Split	6	2	491	1	0	0
17	DF	Zoran Vujović	26 August 1958	21	5	(Socialist Federal Republic of Yugoslavia) Hajduk Split	5	2	409	0	1	0

== Zambia ==
Head coach: Dick Chama

No.	Pos.	Player	DoB	Age	Caps	Club	Tournament games	Tournament goals	Minutes played	Sub off	Sub on	Cards yellow/red
1	GK	Kenny Mwape			?	(Zambia) Green Buffaloes	3	0	270	0	0	0
2	DF	Milton Muke	10 June 1951	29	?	(Zambia) Green Buffaloes	3	0	270	0	0	0
3	DF	Kaiser Kalambo	6 July 1953	27	?	(Zambia) Ndola United	3	0	270	0	0	0
4	DF	Michael Musonda			?	(Zambia) Power Dynamos	1	0	61	1	0	0
5	DF	Kampela Katumba			?	(Zambia) Green Buffaloes	3	0	270	0	0	0
6	MD	Evans Katebe			?	(Zambia) Mufulira Wanderers	3	0	270	0	0	0
7	MD	Moses Simwala	16 July 1949	31	?	(Zambia) Nkana Red Devils	3	0	270	0	0	0
8	MD	Clement Banda			?	(Zambia) Kabwe Warriors	3	0	270	0	0	0
9	FW	Alex Chola	6 June 1956	24	?	(Zambia) Power Dynamos	2	0	180	0	0	0
10	FW	Godfrey Chitalu	22 October 1947	32	?	(Zambia) Kabwe Warriors	3	2	270	0	0	0
11	MD	Pele Kaimana			?	(Zambia) Green Buffaloes	3	0	270	0	0	0
12	MD	Fredrick Kashimoto	14 June 1957	23	?	(Zambia) Mufulira Wanderers	1	0	63	1	0	0
13	DF	Bernard Mutale			?	(Zambia) Red Arrows	0	0	0	0	0	0
14	DF	Moffat Sinkala			?	(Zambia) Nchanga Rangers	3	0	209	0	1	0
15	FW	Stanley Tembo			?	(Zambia) Kabwe United	1	0	27	0	1	0
16	FW	Enock Kalepa			?	(Zambia) Mufulira Wanderers	0	0	0	0	0	0
22	GK	Ghost Mulenga			?	(Zambia) Red Arrows	0	0	0	0	0	0

Due to the boycott of the Olympics, Zambia took part in place of Egypt.
