= Zambia at the 1980 Summer Olympics =

- IOC code: ZAM
- NOC: National Olympic Committee of Zambia

in Moscow, Soviet Union 19 July–3 August 1980
- Competitors: 37 in 4 sports
- Medals: Gold 0 Silver 0 Bronze 0 Total 0

Summer Olympics appearances (overview)
- 1964; 1968; 1972; 1976; 1980; 1984; 1988; 1992; 1996; 2000; 2004; 2008; 2012; 2016; 2020; 2024

Other related appearances
- Rhodesia (1960)

Zambia competed at the 1980 Summer Olympics in Moscow, USSR. The nation returned to the Olympic Games after boycotting the 1976 Summer Olympics.

== Athletics ==
Men
Track & road events

Athlete	Event	Heat		Quarterfinal		Semifinal		Final	
Athlete	Event	Result	Rank	Result	Rank	Result	Rank	Result	Rank
Davison Lishebo	400 m hurdles	51.73	7	did not advance					
Buumba Halwand	Marathon	2:36:51	43	did not advance					
Damiano Musonda	Marathon	2:42:11	48	did not advance					
Patrick Chiwala	Marathon	DNF		did not advance					
Charles Kachenjela	100 m	11.03	5	did not advance					
Alston Muziyo	200 m	22.47	5	did not advance					
Charles Lupiya	400 m	48.49	4 Q	47.67	7	did not advance			
Archfell Musango	800 m	1:51.6	5	did not advance					
Archfell Musango	1500 m	3:53.7	8	did not advance					
Damiano Musonda	10000 m	29:53.6	9	did not advance					
Charles Lupiya; Alston Muziyo; Archfell Musango; Davison Lishebo	4 x 400 m relay	3:14.9	7	did not advance					

Field events

Athlete	Event	Qualification		Final	
Athlete	Event	Distance	Position	Distance	Position
Bogger Mushanga	Triple jump	14.79	17	did not advance	

== Boxing ==
Men

Athlete	Event	1 Round	2 Round	3 Round	Quarterfinals	Semifinals	Final	
Athlete	Event	Opposition Result	Opposition Result	Opposition Result	Opposition Result	Opposition Result	Opposition Result	Rank
Webbyego Mwangu (Note: often known as Webby)	Flyweight	BYE	Henryk Średnicki (POL); L 0-5	did not advance				
Lucky Mutale	Bantamweight	Moussa Sangare (MLI); W 5-0	Dumitru Cipere (ROU); L 0-5	did not advance				
Winfred Kabunda	Featherweight	BYE	Takto Youtiya Homrasmy (LAO); W TKO-1	Barry McGuigan (IRL); W 4-1	Rudi Fink (GDR); L 1-4	did not advance		5
Blackson Siukoko	Lightweight	BYE	George Gilbody (GBR); L 1-4	did not advance				
Teddy Makofi	Light Welterweight	BYE	Dietmar Schwarz (GDR); L 0-5	did not advance				
Peter Talanti	Welterweight	BYE	Tömöriin Battör (MGL); W 5-0	Joseph Frost (GBR); L TKO-1	did not advance			
Wilson Kaoma	Light Middleweight	—N/a	BYE	Jackson Rivera (VEN); W RSC-2	Jan Franek (TCH); L TKO-2	did not advance		5
Enock Chama	Middleweight	—N/a	BYE	José Gómez Mustelier (CUB); L 2-3	did not advance			

== Football ==
=== Group A ===
Team	Pld	W	D	L	GF	GA	GD	Pts
Soviet Union	3	3	0	0	15	1	+14	6
Cuba	3	2	0	1	3	9	−6	4
Venezuela	3	1	0	2	3	7	−4	2
Zambia	3	0	0	3	2	6	−4	0

July 20, 1980
12:00

Cuba	1 – 0	Zambia
Roldán 58'	Report

Kirov Stadium, Leningrad
Attendance: 100,000
Referee: Marijan Raus (Socialist Federal Republic of Yugoslavia)

July 22, 1980
12:00

Soviet Union	3 – 1	Zambia
Khidiyatullin 9' 51'; Cherenkov 87'	Report	Chitalu 13'

Lenin Stadium, Moscow
Attendance: 80,000
Referee: Marwan Arafat (Syria)

July 24, 1980
12:00

Venezuela	2 – 1	Zambia
Zubizarreta 86'; Elie 90' (p.k.)	Report	Chitalu 73'

Kirov Stadium, Leningrad
Attendance: 80,000
Referee: Jesús Paulino Siles (Costa Rica)
- Team Roster

- Mirade Mwape
- Milton Muke
- Kaiser Kalambo
- Dickson Makwaza
- Kampela Katumba
- Evans Katebe
- Moses Simwala
- Clement Banda
- Alex Chola
- Godfrey Chitalu
- Pele Kaimana
- Fredrick Kashimoto
- Bernard Mutale
- Moffat Sinkala
- Stanley Tembo
- Ghost Mulenga

== Judo ==
Men

Athlete	Event	Round 1	Round 2	Round 3	Round 4	Repechage 1	Repechage 2	Final / BM	
Athlete	Event	Opposition Result	Opposition Result	Opposition Result	Opposition Result	Opposition Result	Opposition Result	Opposition Result	Rank
Charles Chibwe	−60kg	Samir El-Najjar (SYR); L 0000-1000	did not advance						
Francis Mwanza	−65kg	Michael Young (AUS); L 0000-1000	did not advance						
George Hamaiko	−71kg	Maurice Nkandem (CMR); L 0000-1000	did not advance						
Henry Sichalwe	−78kg	Vladimír Bárta (TCH); L 0000-1000	did not advance						
Donald Muhakatesho	−86kg	BYE	Isaac Azcuy (CUB); L 0000-1000	BYE		Peter Donnelly (GBR); L 0000-1000	did not advance		9
Rex Chizooma	−95kg	BYE	Robert Van de Walle (BEL); L 0000-1000	BYE		István Szepesi (HUN); L 0000-1000	did not advance		9
