= Colombia at the 1980 Summer Olympics =

- IOC code: COL
- NOC: Colombian Olympic Committee

in Moscow
- Competitors: 23 (23 men and 0 women) in 3 sports
- Medals: Gold 0 Silver 0 Bronze 0 Total 0

Summer Olympics appearances (overview)
- 1932; 1936; 1948; 1952; 1956; 1960; 1964; 1968; 1972; 1976; 1980; 1984; 1988; 1992; 1996; 2000; 2004; 2008; 2012; 2016; 2020; 2024

Colombia competed at the 1980 Summer Olympics in Moscow, USSR.

== Results and competitors by event ==
=== Athletics ===
Men's 10,000 metres

- Domingo Tibaduiza
  - Heat — did not finish (→ did not advance)

Men's Marathon

- Domingo Tibaduiza
  - Final — 2:17:06 (→ 17th place)
- Luis Barbosa
  - Final — 2:22:58 (→ 34th place)

Men's 20 km Walk

- Enrique Peña
  - Final — 1:38:00.0 (→ 17th place)
- Ernesto Alfaro
  - Final — 1:42:19.7 (→ 19th place)

Men's 50 km Walk

- Enrique Peña
  - Final — 4:29:27 (→ 14th place)
- Ernesto Alfaro
  - Final — 4:46:28 (→ 15th place)

=== Football ===
==== Men's team competition ====
- Preliminary Round (Group B)
  - Lost to Czechoslovakia (0-3)
  - Drew with Kuwait (1-1)
  - Defeated Nigeria (1-0)
- Quarter Final
  - Did not advance
- Team Roster

Head coach: Eduardo Retat

No.	Pos.	Player	DoB	Age	Caps	Club	Tournament games	Tournament goals	Minutes played	Sub off	Sub on	Cards yellow/red
1	GK	Carlos Valencia	Dec 30, 1953	26	?	(Colombia) Deportivo Cali	1	0	90	0	0	0
2	DF	Heberth González	May 31, 1958	22	?	(Colombia) Deportes Quindío	3	0	270	0	0	0
3	DF	Astolfo Romero	Dec 15, 1957	22	?	(Colombia) Deportes Quindío	3	0	270	0	0	1Y
4	DF	Henry Viáfara	Apr 20, 1953	27	?	(Colombia) Deportivo Pereira	3	0	270	0	0	1Y
5	DF	Israel Viloria	Nov 13, 1954	25	?	(Colombia) Deportes Quindio	2	0	138	0	1	0
6	FW	Gilberto García	Jul 15, 1959	20	?	(Colombia) América de Cali	3	0	270	0	0	1Y
7	DF	Jorge Porras	Dec 25, 1959	20	?	(Colombia) Atlético Nacional	3	0	270	0	0	0
8	FW	Norberto Peluffo	Jun 26, 1958	22	?	(Colombia) Atlético Nacional	3	0	101	2	1	0
9	MD	Pedro Sarmiento	May 26, 1956	24	?	(Colombia) Atlético Nacional	3	0	270	0	0	0
10	MD	José Hernandez	May 18, 1956	24	?	(Colombia) Deportivo Pereira	1	0	90	0	0	0
11	FW	Benjamin Cardona	Jul 17, 1957	22	?	(Colombia) Deportivo Pereira	3	1	269	1	0	1Y
12	GK	Heberth Ríos	Sep 28, 1956	23	?	(Colombia) Once Caldas	2	0	180	0	0	0
13	MD	Alexis García	Jul 21, 1960	19	?	(Colombia) Once Caldas	3	0	132	1	2	0
14	MD	Fernando Fiorillo	Nov 23, 1956	23	?	(Colombia) Atlético Junior	2	0	156	0	1	0
15	FW	Carlos Molinares	Jun 23, 1956	24	?	(Colombia) Atlético Junior	2	1	111	0	1	0
16	FW	Luis Pérez	Sep 12, 1957	20	?	(Colombia) Union Magdalena	1	0	59	1	0	0
17	MD	Radamel García	Apr 16, 1957	23	?	(Colombia) Independiente Santa Fe	1	0	24	1	0	0

=== Swimming ===
Men's 100m Breaststroke

- Pablo Restrepo
  - Final — 1.05,91 (→ 7th place)

== See also ==
- Sports in Colombia
