= Fernando Pereira (disambiguation) =

Fernando Pereira (1950–1985) was a Dutch photographer.

Fernando Pereira may also refer to:

- Fernando Pereira (engineer) (1930–2018), Spanish engineer and professor
- Fernando Pereira (major) (born 1963), major in the military of São Tomé and Príncipe
- Fernando Pereira, co-founder of Naked News
- Fernando Pereira (Angolan footballer) (born 1973), Angolan footballer
- Fernando Pereira (Venezuelan footballer) (born 1959), Venezuelan footballer
- Fernando Pereira (Portuguese footballer) (born 1968), Portuguese football player and coach
- Fernando Pereira Kosec, Uruguayan politician
