= Kampela =

Kampela can refer to:

- Arthur Kampela, Brazilian-American composer
- Kampela Katumba, Zambian footballer
- Kampela-class landing craft, Finnish utility landing craft class
