= Valas-class transport =

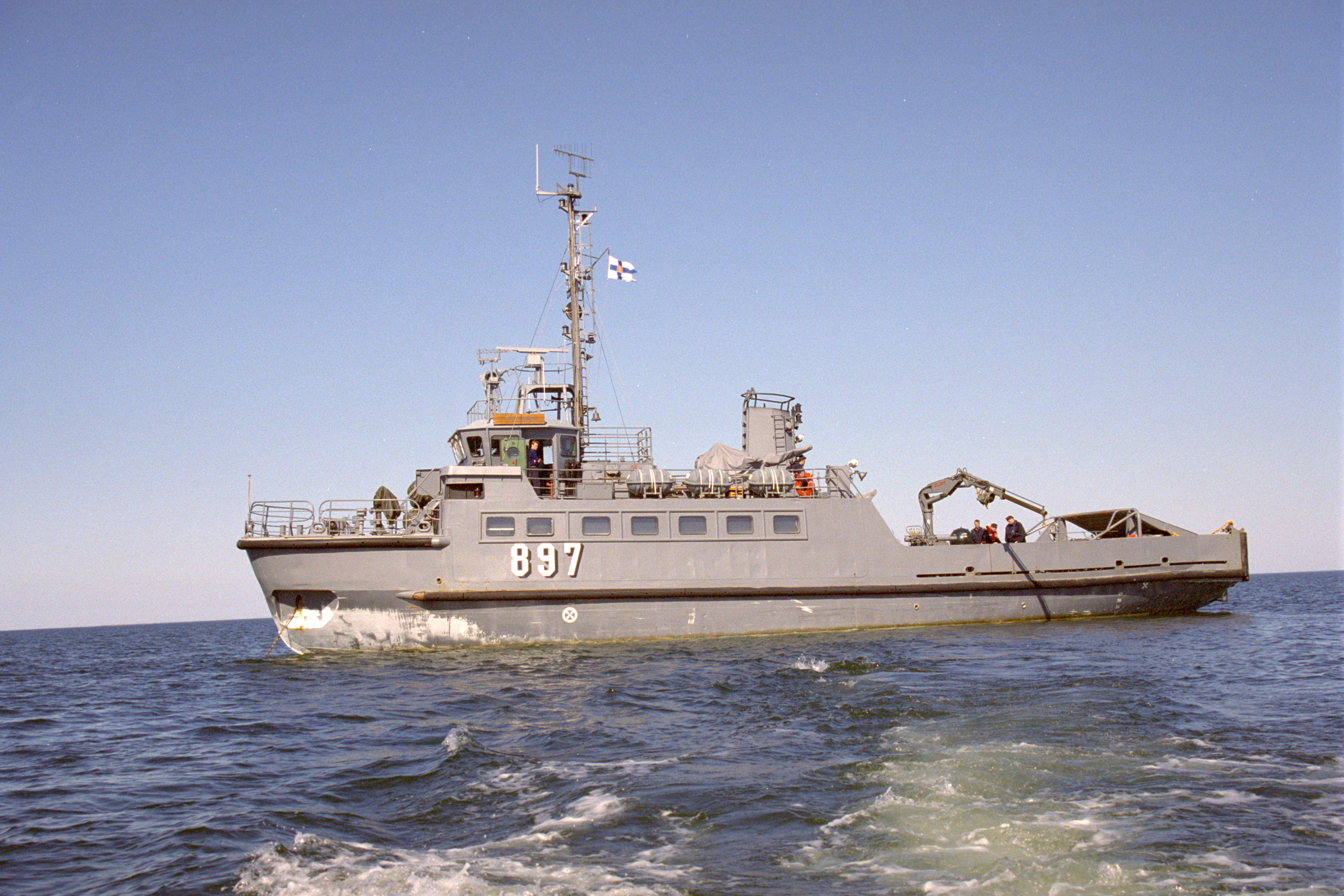
- Valas

Class overview
- Builders: Hollming Oy (4 ships); Enso-Gutzeit (Mursu)
- Operators: Finnish Navy
- Subclasses: Mursu
- Built: 1979–1981
- Completed: 5

General characteristics
- Type: Transport ship
- Displacement: 300 t (300 long tons)
- Length: 30 m (98 ft 5 in)
- Beam: 8 m (26 ft 3 in)
- Propulsion: 1,080 kW (1,450 hp)
- Speed: 12 knots (22 km/h)
- Capacity: 150 passengers or 30 t (30 long tons) cargo
- Armament: 1 x ZU-23-2 anti-aircraft gun; 1 × 20 mm (0.79 in) gun; naval mines

The Valas class were ice-going transport ships operated by the Finnish Navy from the 1980s to 2010s. The Valas class (Whale) consisted of five ships that were used to transport passengers and vehicles. They had secondary duties as tugboats and were also capable of laying naval mines. One ship of the class, Mursu, was built to modified design as a diving support vessel.

== Background ==
The Valas class was designed in the 1970s to improve Finnish Navy transport capacity and particularly to help supply coastal forts during winter. Communications with coastal fort islands was done with liaison boats and ships while heavy equipment and vehicles were transported by Kave and Kala-class landing craft. Pellinki was the only ship able to satisfactorily operate in ice. During winter supply had to be usually done over the ice by ice roads or by ski. In spring and autumn when the ice was too thick for ships but too thin to carry, hydrocopters were sometimes the only means to reach the islands.

== Ships ==
The four basic transport ships were built by Hollming Oy in Rauma between 1979 and 1981. Valas was used for general transport duties. Vahakari, Vaarlahti and Vänö were directly subordinated to various coastal artillery units and were named after islands. The ships have passenger spaces forward and an open cargo deck with a stern ramp aft. The ships have naval mine rails and can operate as auxiliary minelayers. Propulsion is provided by Wärtsilä Vasa 8R22B engine driving a single propeller with bow thruster for improved maneuverability. Designed to operate in ice the ships have a Finnish-Swedish ice class 1A and can break 30 centimetres (12 in) thick ice. Valas class was originally also intended to be able help in oil spill cleanup, but these duties were later taken over by more specialized ships.

=== Mursu ===
Mursu (Walrus) was built by Enso-Gutzeit Laitaatsilta shipyard in Savonlinna in 1980. Mursu was built as dedicated diving support vessel and has a somewhat different design compared to the other Valas-class ships. The superstructure has been extended aft, covering the cargo deck area and the stern ramp is not included. The ship has a diving chamber, living quarters, classrooms and other diving support facilities. Mursu was the first ship in the Finnish Navy that was specifically designed and built as a diving support vessel. As Savonlinna is located on Lake Saimaa the ship had to navigate Saimaa canal to reach the Baltic Sea. Since warships are not permitted to navigate the canal the ship was officially owned by the shipyard until it was handed over to the Finnish Navy in Katajanokka in Helsinki.

== Gallery ==
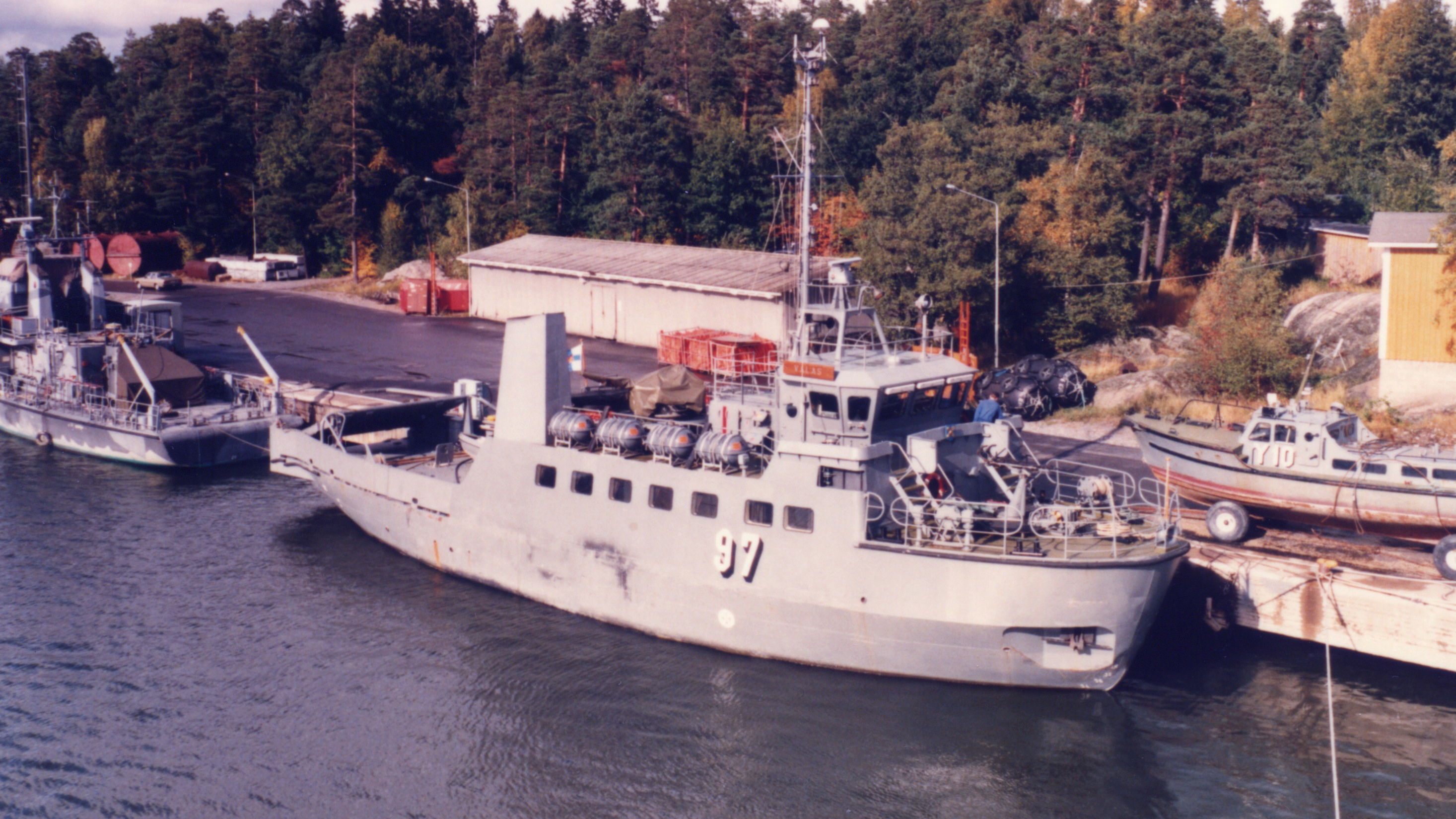
Valas in 1982

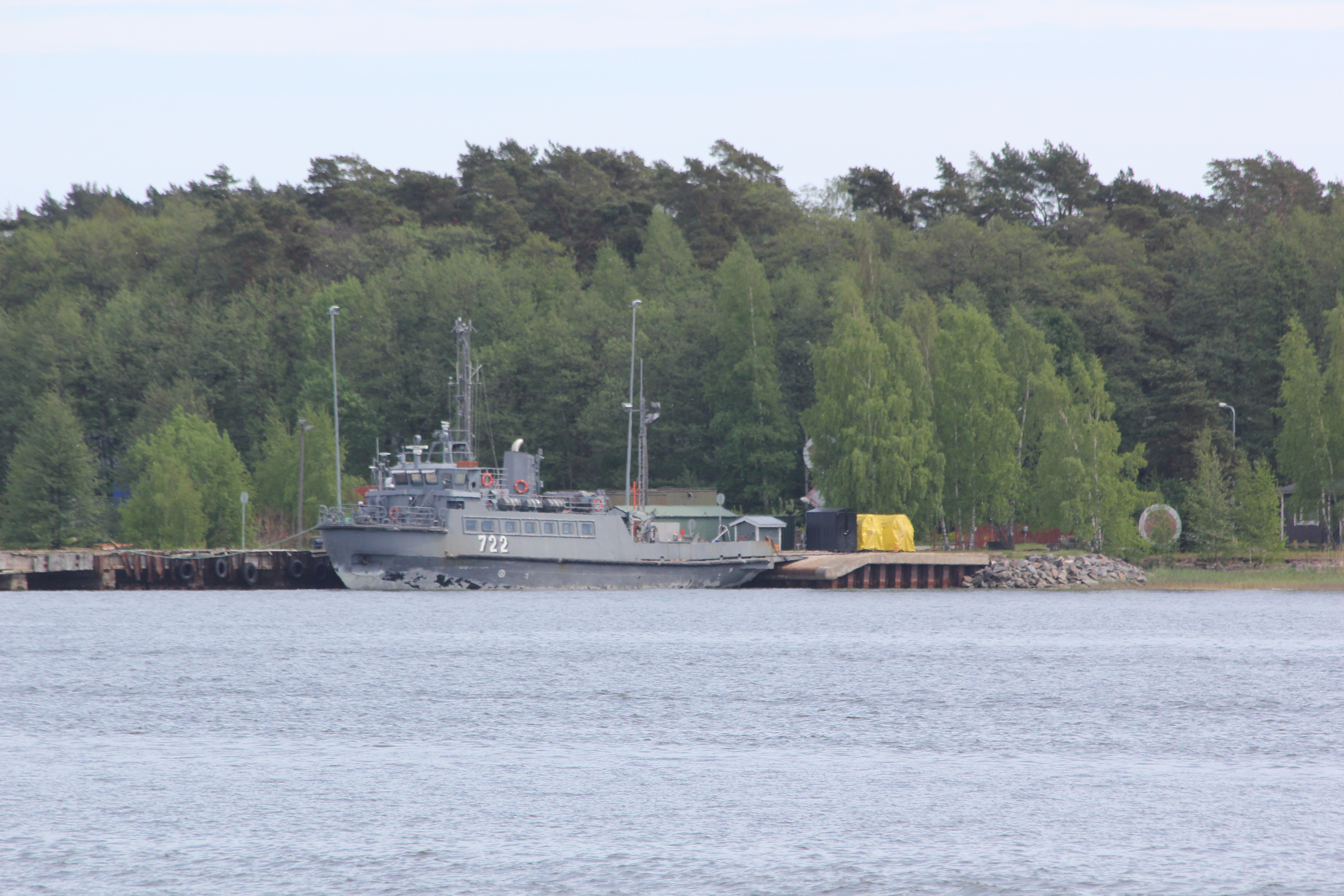
Vaarlahti

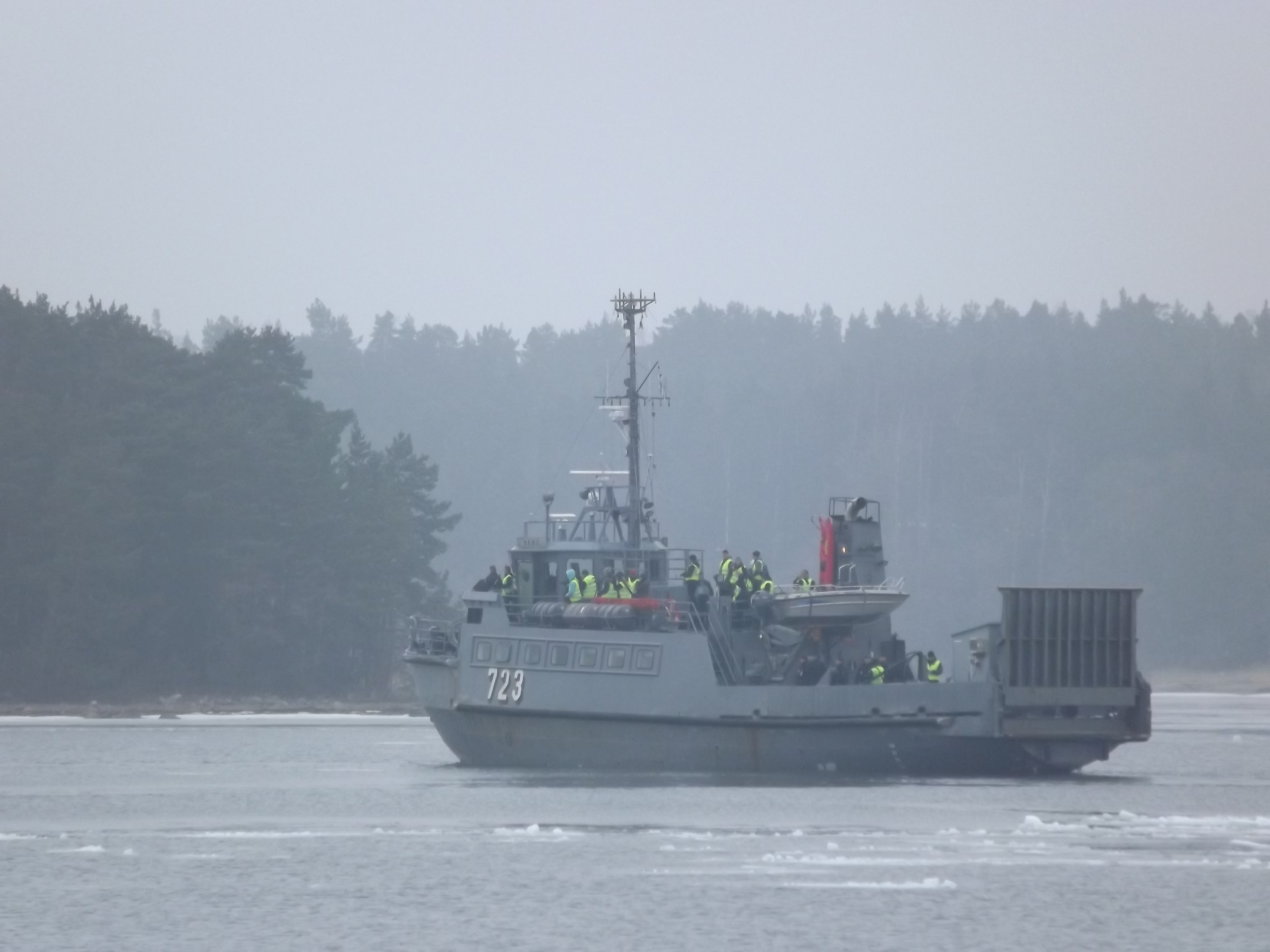
Vänö

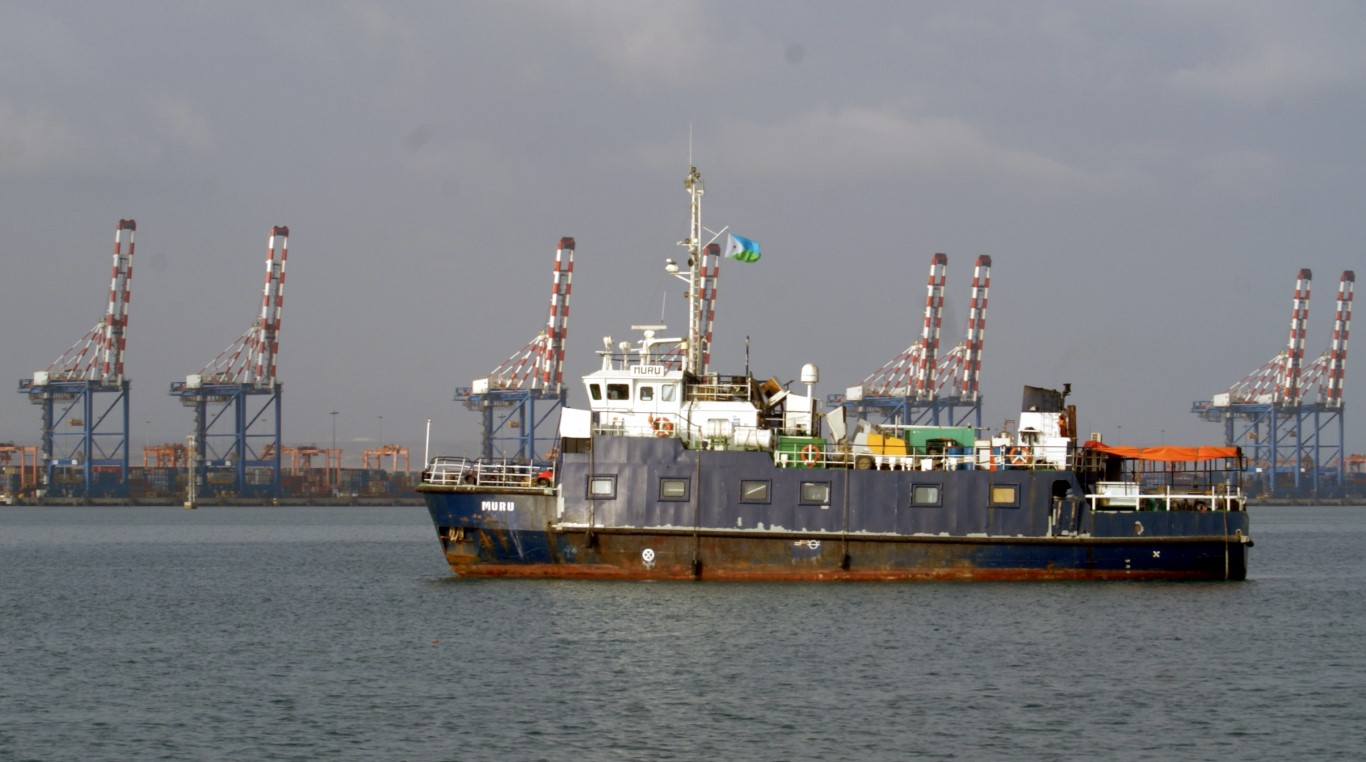
Muru, former Mursu
