= Carlos Valencia =

Carlos Valencia may refer to:

- Carlos Valencia (footballer, born 1989), Colombian footballer
- Carlos Valencia (footballer, born 1953), Colombian footballer
