= Aleiane Omar Hojeir =

Syrian footballer (born 1954)

Personal information
- Date of birth: 15 March 1954 (age 72)

International career
| Years | Team | Apps | (Gls) |
- Syria

Aleiane Omar Hojeir (born 15 March 1954) is a Syrian footballer. He competed in the men's tournament at the 1980 Summer Olympics.
