= Ahmad Askar =

Kuwaiti footballer

Personal information
- Full name: Ahmad Ghulum Askar Hasan
- Date of birth: 25 August 1961 (age 65)
- Position: Midfielder

Youth career
- 1973–1978: Al-Arabi SC

Senior career*
Years	Team	Apps	(Gls)
1978–1994	Al-Arabi SC		

International career
- Kuwait
- * Club domestic league appearances and goals

Ahmad Askar (born 25 August 1961) is a Kuwaiti footballer. He competed in the men's tournament at the 1980 Summer Olympics.
