= Eldar Azimzade =

Soviet football referee (1934–2003)

- Born: 25 May 1934; Shusha, Azerbaijan SSR, Soviet Union
- Died: 20 January 2003 (aged 68); Baku, Azerbaijan

Domestic
Years	League	Role
1967–1983	Soviet League	Referee

International
Years	League	Role

Eldar Azimzade (Azerbaijani: Eldar Əzimzadə; Russian: Эльдар Азимзаде; 25 May 1934 – 20 January 2003) was a Soviet football referee from Azerbaijan.

Azimzade's biggest refereeing event was the final match of 1980 Olympic tournament between Czechoslovakia and East Germany. The score was:

Czechoslovakia 1 : 0 East Germany

Stats
Competition	Appearances	Yellow Cards	Second Yellow Cards	Red Cards	Penalty Kicks
World Cup Qualification Europe	1	4	0	0	1
European Qualifiers	2	1	0	0	0
European Champion Clubs' Cup	5	7	0	0	1
UEFA Cup	7	13	0	0	0
UEFA Cup Winners' Cup	1	0	0	0	0
Vysshaya Liga	7	0	0	0	2
Olympic Games	2	8	0	2	0
U-20 World Cup 1977	1	1	0	0	0
Total	26	34	0	2	4

Sporting positions
Preceded by (Uruguay) Ramón Barreto	FIFA Men's Olympic Football Tournament Final referee 1980	Succeeded by (Netherlands) Jan KeizeR
