= Samer Zuhair Assassa =

Syrian footballer (born 1960)

Personal information
- Date of birth: 5 May 1960 (age 66)

International career
Years	Team	Apps	(Gls)
- Syria

Samer Zuhair Assassa (born 5 May 1960) is a Syrian footballer. He competed in the men's tournament at the 1980 Summer Olympics.
