= Ibrahim Mahallame =

Syrian footballer (born 1949)

Personal information
- Date of birth: 7 March 1949 (age 77)

International career
Years	Team	Apps	(Gls)
- Syria

Ibrahim Mahallame (born 7 March 1949) is a Syrian footballer who competed in the men's tournament at the 1980 Summer Olympics.
