= Zdeněk Šreiner =

Czech footballer

Personal information
- Full name: Zdeněk Šreiner
- Date of birth: 2 June 1954
- Date of death: 28 November 2017 (aged 63)
- Position: Midfielder

International career
Years	Team	Apps	(Gls)
1980–1984	Czechoslovakia	6	(1)

Olympic medal record

Men's football

Representing Czechoslovakia
Gold medal – first place	1980 Moskva	Team competition

Zdeněk Šreiner (2 June 1954 – 28 November 2017) was a Czech football player who competed in the 1980 Summer Olympics, winning the gold medal as part of the national team.
