= L 9531-class landing craft =

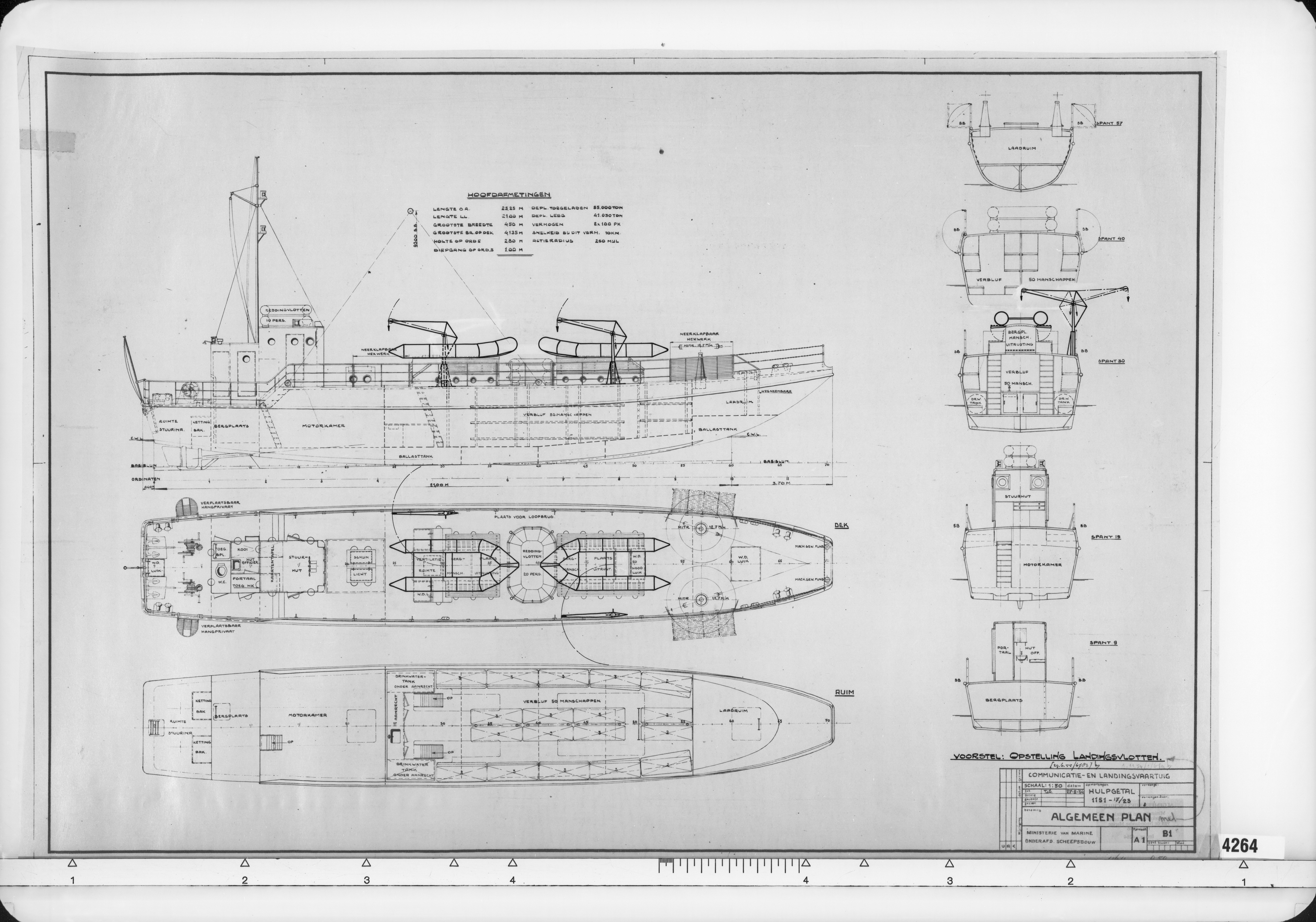

Class overview
- Name: L 9531
- Builders: Rijkswerf Willemsoord, Den Helder
- Operators: Royal Netherlands Navy
- Built: 1955–1956
- In commission: 1955–1963
- Completed: 7
- Retired: 7

General characteristics
- Type: Landing craft
- Displacement: 55 t (54 long tons)
- Length: 25.25 m (82 ft 10 in)
- Beam: 4.50 m (14 ft 9 in)
- Draught: 1 m (3 ft 3 in)
- Propulsion: 2 propellers; 200 shp (150 kW); 2 x Kromhout 8 cylinder four-stroke diesel engines
- Speed: 10 knots (19 km/h; 12 mph)
- Crew: 6
- Armament: 2 × 12.7 mm machine guns; 2 × 7.62 mm machine guns

The L 9531-class landing craft, also known as Type LCPR (Landing Craft Personnel Regional), was a class of seven landing craft that were built by Rijkswerf Willemsoord for the Royal Netherlands Navy (RNLN). During their service in the RNLN they were permanently stationed in Dutch New Guinea. Shortly before the transfer of Dutch New Guinea to the United Nations Temporary Executive Authority, the seven landing craft were decommissioned on 13 February 1963 and transferred to the United Nations Security Force.

== Design and construction ==
The L 9531-class landing craft were built between 1955 and 1956 at Rijkswerf Willemsoord in Den Helder, Netherlands. They had a standard displacement of 55 tons and a complement of six. When it came to measurements, the L 9531-class landing craft had a length of 25.25 metres (82 ft 10 in), a beam of 4.50 metres (14 ft 9 in) and a draught of 1 metre (3 ft 3 in). Furthermore, they were equipped with two Kromhout 8-cylinder four-stroke diesel engines that could produce 200 shaft horsepower (150 kW). This could drive the two shafts to maximum speed of 10 knots (19 km/h; 12 mph). As armament the craft had two 12.7 mm (0.50 in) machine guns and two 7.62 mm (0.300 in) machine guns.

== Service history ==
The L 9531 class entered into service of the Royal Netherlands Navy in 1955 and were permanently stationed in Dutch New Guinea.

Between 1955 and 1956 L 9531 was temporarily made available for hydrographic survey and research activities around Dutch New Guinea.

In March 1962 it was reported that a L 9531-class landing craft was attacked near Gag Island by B-25 Mitchell aircraft of the Indonesian Air Force. That same year the seven landing craft were taken out of service. The following year, on 13 February 1963, they were decommissioned and transferred to the United Nations Security Force.

== Craft ==
L 9531 class construction data
Name	Builder	Laid down	Launched	Commissioned	Decommissioned	Fate
L 9531	Rijkswerf Willemsoord, Den Helder, Netherlands	23 May 1955	11 June 1955	19 August 1955	13 February 1963	Transferred to the United Nations Security Force.
L 9532	Rijkswerf Willemsoord, Den Helder, Netherlands	27 June 1955	6 August 1955	12 September 1955	13 February 1963	Transferred to the United Nations Security Force.
L 9533	Rijkswerf Willemsoord, Den Helder, Netherlands	16 July 1955	6 August 1955	28 September 1955	13 February 1963	Transferred to the United Nations Security Force.
L 9534	Rijkswerf Willemsoord, Den Helder, Netherlands	22 August 1955	21 September 1955	8 November 1955	13 February 1963	Transferred to the United Nations Security Force.
L 9535	Rijkswerf Willemsoord, Den Helder, Netherlands	7 September 1955	21 September 1955	6 December 1955	13 February 1963	Transferred to the United Nations Security Force.
L 9536	Rijkswerf Willemsoord, Den Helder, Netherlands	17 October 1955	19 November 1955	15 December 1955	13 February 1963	Transferred to the United Nations Security Force.
L 9537	Rijkswerf Willemsoord, Den Helder, Netherlands	31 October 1955	19 November 1955	21 January 1956	13 February 1963	Transferred to the United Nations Security Force.

== See also ==
Equivalent landing ships of the same era

- Kala class
