= Abdul Fattah Haona =

Syrian footballer (born 1954)

Personal information
- Date of birth: 23 February 1954 (age 72)

International career
Years	Team	Apps	(Gls)
- Syria

Abdul Fattah Haona (born 23 February 1954) is a Syrian footballer. He competed in the men's tournament at the 1980 Summer Olympics.
