= Ahmed Jihad Chit =

Syrian footballer (born 1954)

Personal information
- Date of birth: 6 August 1954 (age 72)

International career
Years	Team	Apps	(Gls)
- Syria

Ahmed Jihad Chit (born 6 August 1954) is a Syrian footballer. He competed in the men's tournament at the 1980 Summer Olympics.
