= Clement Banda =

Zambian footballer

International career
Years	Team	Apps	(Gls)
- Zambia

Clement Banda is a Zambian footballer. He competed in the men's tournament at the 1980 Summer Olympics.
