= Israel Viloria =

Colombian footballer (born 1954)

Personal information
- Full name: Israel Viloria Freyte
- Date of birth: 23 November 1954 (age 71)
- Height: 1.76 m (5 ft 9 in)
- Position: Defender

Senior career*
Years	Team	Apps	(Gls)
- Deportes Quindío

International career
- Colombia
- * Club domestic league appearances and goals

Israel Viloria Freyte (born 13 November 1954) is a Colombian former footballer who played as a defender. He competed in the men's football tournament at the 1980 Summer Olympics.
