= Archfell Musango =

Zambian middle-distance runner

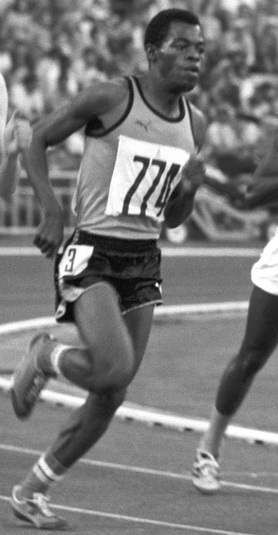
- 1980 Summer Olympics – Men's 800 metres

Personal information
- Nationality: Zambian
- Born: 9 March 1959 (age 67) Zambia
- Height: 176 cm (5 ft 9 in)
- Weight: 69 kg (152 lb)

Sport
- Country: Zambia
- Sport: Middle-distance running

Archfell Musango is a Zambian Olympic middle-distance runner. He represented his country in the men's 1500 meters and the men's 800 meters at the 1984 Summer Olympics, as well as the men's 800 metres, men's 1500 metres, and men's 4 x 400 metres relay at the 1980 Summer Olympics.
