= Pele Kaimana =

Zambian footballer

Personal information
- Position: Forward

Senior career*
Years	Team	Apps	(Gls)
- Green Buffaloes

International career
- Zambia
- * Club domestic league appearances and goals

Pele Kaimana is a Zambian footballer. He competed in the men's tournament at the 1980 Summer Olympics.
