= Jorge White =

Costa Rican footballer (1957-1997)

Personal information
- Date of birth: 12 November 1957
- Date of death: 29 March 1997 (aged 39)
- Position: Forward

International career
Years	Team	Apps	(Gls)
- Costa Rica

Jorge White (12 November 1957 – 29 March 1997) was a Costa Rican footballer. He competed in the men's tournament at the 1980 Summer Olympics. He died by drowning in a pond while trying to retrieve a football.
