= Luis Pérez (Colombian footballer) =

Colombian footballer (born 1957)

Personal information
- Date of birth: 12 September 1957 (age 69)
- Place of birth: Santa Marta, Colombia
- Position: Forward

International career
Years	Team	Apps	(Gls)
- Colombia

Luis Pérez (born 12 September 1957) is a Colombian former footballer. He competed in the men's tournament at the 1980 Summer Olympics.
