= Kala-class landing craft =

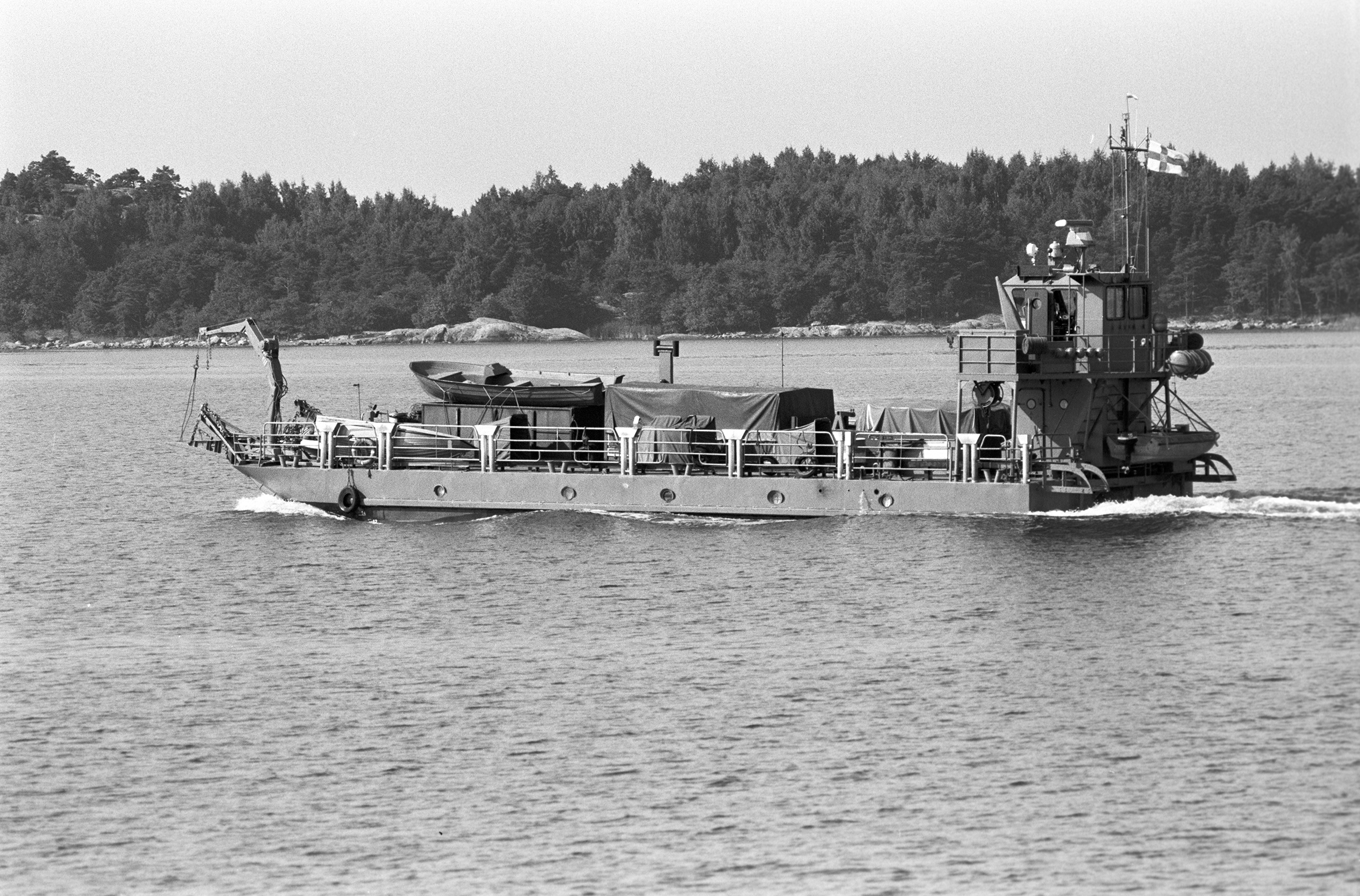

Class overview
- Builders: Rauma-Repola (3 ships); Haminan konepaja (3 ships)
- Operators: Finnish Navy
- Succeeded by: Kampela class
- Built: 1956–1959
- Completed: 6

General characteristics
- Type: Utility landing craft
- Displacement: 60 t (59 long tons) (empty); 200 t (200 long tons) (full load)
- Length: 27 m (88 ft 7 in)
- Beam: 8 m (26 ft 3 in)
- Draft: 1.2 m (3 ft 11 in)
- Propulsion: 2 × 130 kW (180 hp)
- Speed: 9 knots (17 km/h)
- Capacity: 100 t (98 long tons)
- Complement: 10
- Armament: 1 × 20 mm (0.79 in) gun

The Kala-class landing craft were a series of utility landing craft operated by the Finnish Navy from the 1950s to early 2000s. The class had six ships and several ships of the class remain in civilian use as of 2025.

== Design ==
The Kala class (from Finnish: kalustolautta "equipment ferry") was designed in 1950s as part of Finnish Navy post-World War II reconstruction. Finnish defence forces 1955 equipment development plan included six larger and six smaller utility landing craft. Kala class was designed to fulfill the larger landing craft requirement; the smaller became the Kave-class landing craft. The design requirements called for 100-metric-ton (98-long-ton) cargo capacity with at least a 38-metric-ton (37-long-ton; 42-short-ton) single unit load (ie. a tank). The ships were to be able to unload cargo directly on the shore without the need of a pier. The Finnish Navy had experience with German Siebel ferries during World War II and partly based the Kala class on their design. The Kala class was designed with catamaran hull for both large cargo area and stability. A bow ramp was provided for vehicles. The ships had also provisions for naval mine rails so that they could act as minelayers. The original requirements also included the ability to break the ships into loads for road transport, with two hull pontoons and dismantled deck structure. In practice the road transport ability was seldom used.

== Ships in service ==
The ships in the class, Kala 1 through Kala 6 were built by Rauma-Repola in Valko and Haminan konepaja in Hamina, three ships each. The ships were used to supply coastal forts, served with amphibious troops and were used for general logistics supply and transport needs. The design was considered successful and the following Kampela class is an enlarged and improved version of the Kala class. As originally built the Kala class had minimal superstructure with only a small control cabin in the rear and received the nickname "floating telephone booths". The ships were rebuilt between 1975 and 1980 with enlarged superstructure and new, modernized bridge.

Kala 4 and Kala 5 were experimentally armed with German 10.5 cm SK C/32 naval guns between 1960 and 1964, a single gun each. The guns were removed after the experiment and the other members of the class were not armed with them.

== Civilian use ==
The Finnish Navy sold the Kala-class ships as military surplus in the early 2000s. Several ships of the class survive in civilian use: Kala 5 was sold to Harjanti Oy as MS Hessu and Kala 6 to Meripojat Oy. The Helsinki city fire department purchased Kala 3 for oil spill cleanup duties and renamed the vessel Miina. Kala 4 caused concern when it was found in the possession of Airiston Helmi after the company was raided by Finnish police for suspected economic crimes. The company was also suspected of being a front for Russian intelligence agencies. Kala 4 had been modified to better suit transporting tourists rather than heavy equipment as originally built.

== See also ==
Equivalent landing ships of the same era

- L 9531 class
