= Lothar Hause =

East German footballer (born 1955)

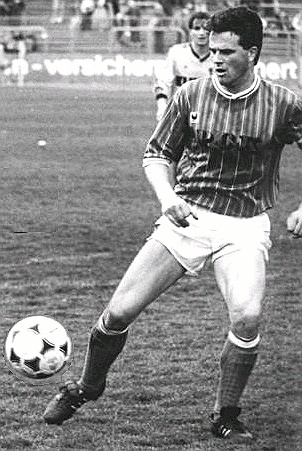
- Hause in 1990

Personal information
- Date of birth: 22 October 1955 (age 71)
- Place of birth: Lübbenau, East Germany

Senior career*
Years	Team	Apps	(Gls)
1973-1991	FC Vorwärts / FC Victoria '91 Frankfurt/Oder	346	(39)

International career
1978-1982	East Germany	9	(1)
Medal record
Men's football
Representing East Germany
Olympic Games
Silver medal – second place	1980 Moscow	Team competition
- * Club domestic league appearances and goals

Lothar Hause (born 22 October 1955 in Lübbenau, Bezirk Cottbus) is a former football player from East Germany, who won the silver medal with the East German Olympic team at the 1980 Summer Olympics in Moscow, Soviet Union.

== Club career ==
He played 281 matches in the East German top division for FC Vorwärts Frankfurt/Oder.

== International career ==
Lothar Hause won a total number of nine caps and scored one goal between 1978 and 1982 for East Germany.
