= Stanley Tembo =

Zambian footballer

Personal information
- Position: Forward

International career
Years	Team	Apps	(Gls)
- Zambia

Stanley Tembo is a Zambian footballer. He competed in the men's tournament at the 1980 Summer Olympics.
