= Ari Tissari =

Finnish footballer (1951–2023)

Personal information
- Full name: Ari Olavi Tissari
- Date of birth: 24 November 1951
- Place of birth: Kotka, Finland
- Date of death: 3 November 2023 (aged 71)
- Place of death: Kotka, Finland
- Height: 1.80 m (5 ft 11 in)
- Position: Striker

Senior career*
Years	Team	Apps	(Gls)
1969–1980	KTP		
1981	Vasalund	13	(0)
1981–1985	KTP		

International career
1980	Finland	3	(1)
- * Club domestic league appearances and goals

Ari Olavi Tissari (24 November 1951 – 3 November 2023) was a Finnish footballer who played as a striker. He competed in the men's tournament at the 1980 Summer Olympics. Tissari died in November 2023, at the age of 71.
