= Milton Muke =

Zambian footballer (born 1951)

Personal information
- Date of birth: 10 June 1951 (age 75)
- Position: Defender

International career
Years	Team	Apps	(Gls)
- Zambia

Milton Muke (born 10 June 1951) is a Zambian former footballer. He competed in the men's tournament at the 1980 Summer Olympics.
