= Fernando Pereira (Venezuelan footballer) =

Venezuelan footballer (born 1959)

Personal information
- Date of birth: 22 October 1959 (age 67)
- Position: Midfielder

International career
Years	Team	Apps	(Gls)
- Venezuela

Fernando Pereira (born 22 October 1959) is a Venezuelan former footballer. He competed in the men's tournament at the 1980 Summer Olympics.
