= Kave-class landing craft =

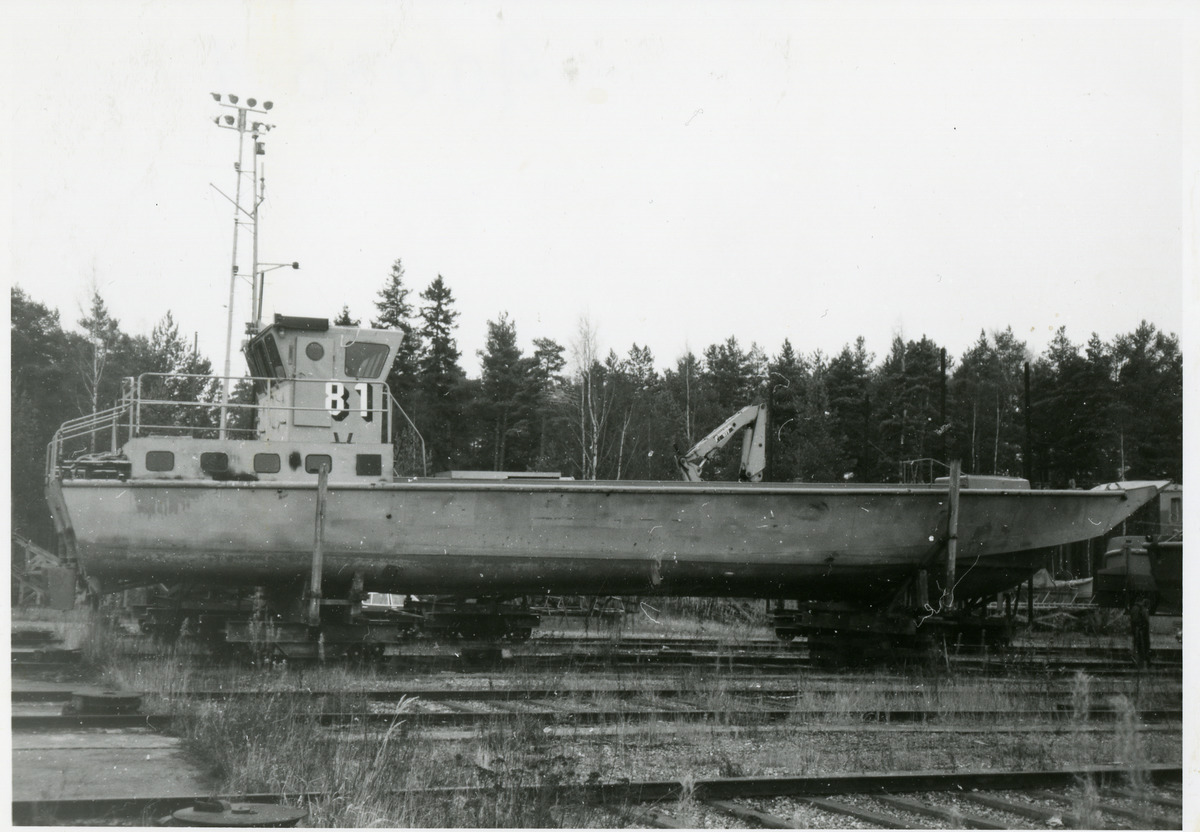
- A Kave-class landing craft in Upinniemi

Class overview
- Builders: Haminan konepaja; Hollming Oy
- Operators: Finnish Navy
- Built: 1956-1960
- Completed: 6
- Lost: 1

General characteristics
- Type: Utility landing craft
- Displacement: 30 t (30 long tons)
- Length: 23 m (75 ft 6 in)
- Beam: 5 m (16 ft 5 in)
- Propulsion: 2 × 130 kW (180 hp)
- Speed: 9 knots (17 km/h)
- Complement: 6
- Armament: 1 × 20 mm (0.79 in) gun

The Kave-class landing craft were six small utility landing craft built between 1956 and 1960 operated by the Finnish Navy during the Cold War.

== Design ==
The Kave class (also styled KaVe or KAVE; from Finnish: kalustovene "equipment boat") was designed in 1950s as part of Finnish Navy post-World War II reconstruction. The Finnish defence forces' 1955 equipment development plan included six larger and six smaller utility landing craft. Of these, the Kave class was designed to fulfill the smaller landing craft requirement; the larger became the Kala class. The Navy boat committee was tasked to design both types. The Kave was designed to transport amphibious landing force second-echelon follow-up heavy weapons and light vehicles as well as supplies. The craft are single-hull with a cargo area and bow ramp with an enclosed control cabin.

== Construction and career ==
Kave 1 was built in 1956 by Haminan konepaja in Hamina. This craft has a somewhat different structure compared to later Kave-class vessels, most notably the control cabin is located on the side of the cargo area instead of stern as in other vessels. The funding for the remaining craft was not approved until 1959 and Kave 2 through Kave 6 were built in 1960 by Hollming Oy at Rauma. The Kave class served with amphibious troops and were used to supply coastal forts with personnel and material. The class was found versatile but their speed was considered too slow.

Kave 5 was lost shortly after completion. On 18 October 1960 the craft was under tow by the minelayer Keihässalmi near Hanko when the bow ramp was lowered. Onrushing water filled the cargo area and quickly sank the ship. After this incident the bow ramp structure of the remaining Kave-class vessels was modified to prevent a similar occurrence. Kave 5 was never found despite search efforts.
