= Luis Hernández (footballer, born 1959) =

Cuban footballer

Personal information
- Full name: Luis Hernández Cabrera
- Date of birth: 23 June 1959 (age 67)
- Height: 1.78 m (5 ft 10 in)
- Position: Midfielder

Senior career*
Years	Team	Apps	(Gls)
- Ciudad La Habana

International career
- Cuba
- * Club domestic league appearances and goals

Luis Hernández Cabrera (born 23 June 1959) is a Cuban footballer. He competed in the men's tournament at the 1980 Summer Olympics.
