= Moffat Sinkala =

Zambian footballer (died 2004)

Personal information
- Date of death: June 2004
- Position: Defender

International career
Years	Team	Apps	(Gls)
- Zambia

Moffat Mutumbo Sinkala (date of birth unknown, died June 2004) was a Zambian footballer. He competed in the men's tournament at the 1980 Summer Olympics.
