= Gilberto García (footballer, born 1959) =

Colombian footballer

Personal information
- Date of birth: 15 July 1959 (age 67)
- Place of birth: Santa Marta, Colombia
- Position: Forward

International career
Years	Team	Apps	(Gls)
- Colombia

Gilberto García (born 15 July 1959) is a Colombian former footballer. He competed in the men's tournament at the 1980 Summer Olympics.
