= Heberth González =

Colombian footballer (born 1958)

Personal information
- Full name: Heberth Antonio González Sánchez
- Date of birth: 31 May 1958 (age 68)
- Place of birth: Caldas, Colombia
- Height: 1.75 m (5 ft 9 in)
- Position: Right-back

Senior career*
| Years | Team | Apps | (Gls) |
| 1978–1981 | Deportes Quindío | | |
| 1982–1983 | Deportivo Pereira | | |
| 1983–1985 | Deportes Tolima | | |
| 1986–1987 | Atlético Nacional | | |
| 1987–1990 | Deportivo Pereira | | |

International career
| 1981–1984 | Colombia | 2 | (0) |
- * Club domestic league appearances and goals

Heberth Antonio González Sánchez (born 31 May 1958) is a Colombian former footballer who played as a right-back. He competed in the men's tournament at the 1980 Summer Olympics.
