= Wolfgang Steinbach =

German footballer (born 1954)

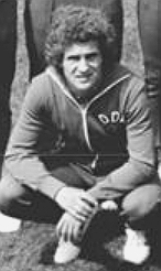
- Steinbach in 1980

Personal information
- Date of birth: 21 September 1954 (age 72)
- Place of birth: Schönebeck, Bezirk Magdeburg, East Germany
- Height: 1.65 m (5 ft 5 in)
- Position: Midfielder

Youth career
- –1968: BSG Chemie Schönebeck
- 1968–1972: 1. FC Magdeburg

Senior career*
Years	Team	Apps	(Gls)
1971–1987	1. FC Magdeburg	297	(66)
1987–1989	Motor Schönebeck		
1989–1990	1. FC Magdeburg	40	(9)
1990–1994	VfB Oldenburg	104	(10)
Total		441	(85)

International career
1978–1985	East Germany	28	(1)

Managerial career
- 1993: VfB Oldenburg
- 1995–1999: BV Cloppenburg
- 1999–2002: VfB Oldenburg
- 2002–2007: SV Wilhelmshaven
- 2007–2008: Preußen Magdeburg
- 2008–2009: SV Wilhelmshaven (director of sports)
- 2009–2011: SV Wilhelmshaven
Medal record
Representing East Germany
Men's Football
Silver medal – second place	1980 Moscow	Team competition
- * Club domestic league appearances and goals

Wolfgang "Maxe" Steinbach (born 21 September 1954) is a German former football player and manager who spent most of his career playing for 1. FC Magdeburg in the DDR-Oberliga. At international level, he made 28 appearances for the East Germany national team scoring one goal. In 2006, he was elected Best 1. FC Magdeburg Player of All Times in a telephone vote.

== Playing career ==
Steinbach was born in Schönebeck. He started his top flight career at 1. FC Magdeburg when he played in a single match in the 1971–72 season. He had his breakthrough in the 1974–75 season when he played in 17 matches, scoring 2 goals. He stayed with 1. FC Magdeburg until 1987, when he left for his home town club of Motor Schönebeck where he spent the next one and a half years in the second-tier DDR-Liga. In the winterbreak of the 1988–89 season he returned to the DDR-Oberliga with 1. FC Magdeburg. After German reunification, Steinbach was signed by West German 2. Bundesliga side VfB Oldenburg. He spent the rest of his playing career with them, managing the team for a time in the 1993–94 season. Overall, Steinbach played in 337 DDR-Oberliga matches, scoring 75 goals. In the 2. Bundesliga he played another 104 matches with 10 goals scored.

From 1978 to 1985 he earned 28 caps to the East Germany national team, scoring one goal. He was part of the East Germany squad that won the Silver medal at the 1980 Olympic Games in Moscow. He played in all matches in the tournament, scoring one goal. He was sent off in the final against Czechoslovakia.

With 1. FC Magdeburg, Steinbach won three East German championships and four FDGB-Pokal titles.

== Coaching career ==
Following his playing career, Steinbach took up managing, starting at VfB Oldenburg in 1993–94. He returned to Oldenburg in 1999, staying at the helm until the 2001–02 season. Later he spent four years with then-Oberliga Nord side SV Wilhelmshaven where he won promotion to third-tier Regionalliga Nord in 2006. Following a lengthy spell of unsuccessful matches, he was sacked on 3 April 2007. From July 2007 to May 2008, he was manager of Verbandsliga Sachsen-Anhalt side Preußen Magdeburg. Since October 2008 he has the role of director of sports at SV Wilhelmshaven, but took over as manager again in the spring of 2009.

== Honours ==
- DDR-Oberliga: 1971–72, 1973–74, 1974–75
- FDGB-Pokal: 1973, 1978, 1979, 1983
