= Kampela-class landing craft =

Decommissioned Finnish landing crafts

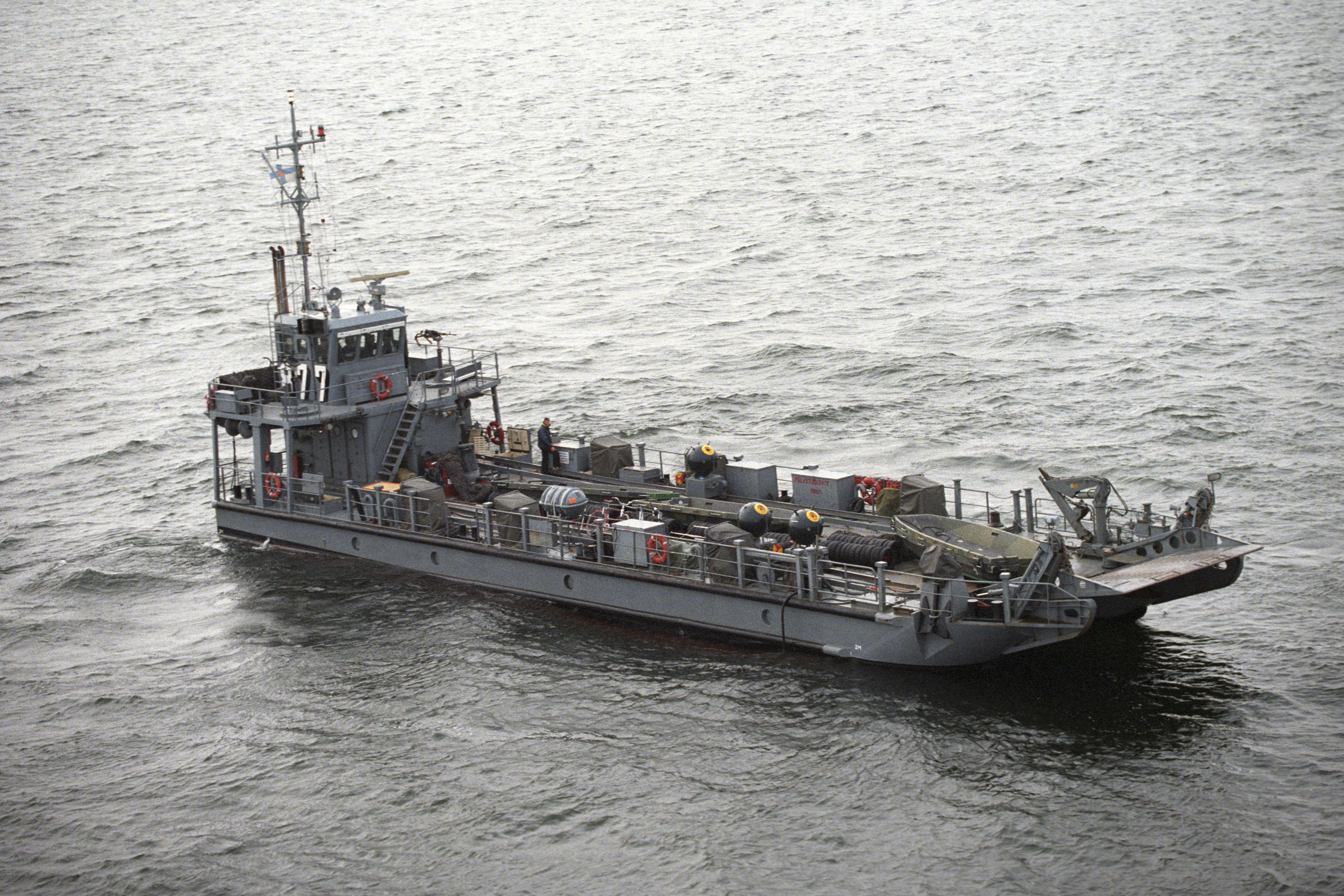
- Kampela 3

Class overview
- Builders: Enso-Gutzeit (2 ships); Finnmekano (Kampela 3)
- Operators: Finnish Navy
- Preceded by: Kala class
- Built: 1976–1979
- Completed: 3
- Scrapped: 1

General characteristics
- Type: Utility landing craft
- Displacement: 240 t (240 long tons)
- Length: 32.5 m (106 ft 8 in)
- Beam: 8 m (26 ft 3 in)
- Draft: 1.5 m (4 ft 11 in)
- Propulsion: 2 × 170 kW (230 hp)
- Speed: 9 knots (17 km/h)
- Capacity: 95 t (93 long tons)
- Complement: 10
- Armament: ZU-23-2; 50 Naval mines

The Kampela-class landing craft were a series of utility landing craft operated by the Finnish Navy from the late 1970s to 2010s. Kampela (Flatfish) class had three ships.

== Design ==
The Kampela-class design was started in mid-1970s after the 2nd parliamentary defense review. Since the preceding Kala-class landing craft were considered successful the Kampela class was designed as a modernized and somewhat enlarged version of Kala class. The Kampela class has the same basic catamaran structure with two hulls, cargo area between them and bridge in the stern. The Kampela class was also fitted with two liquid storage tanks for liquid transport and active rudders for improved manoeuvering. Similar to the Kalas, the Kampela class can be used as a minelayer.

== Construction and service ==
Kampela 1 and Kampela 2, intended for coastal artillery, were built by Enso-Gutzeit dockyard in Savonlinna. The choice of the shipyard was partially done to help employment in the region. Since Savonlinna is located on Lake Saimaa the ships had to transit the Saimaa Canal to reach the Baltic Sea. As warships were not permitted to travel the canal the ships were officially owned by Enso-Gutzeit and sailing under merchant flag until they were handed over to Finnish Defence Forces in Kotka. The navy Kampela 3 was built by Finnmekano. The ships were constructed between 1976 and 1979 and they joined the Kala-class in transporting heavy equipment.

In 1996 Kampela 3 was modified for minehunting duties and equipped with Bofors Double Eagle remotely operated underwater vehicle. The ship was attached to the 4th Mine squadron and she was also used for other underwater tasks.

== Decommissioning ==
The Kampela class was decommissioned from Finnish Navy service in the 2010s. Kampela 1 and Kampela 2 were sold for civilian ownership. Kampela 3 was scrapped in 2022 in Upinniemi.
