= Jouko Alila =

Finnish footballer (born 1950)

Personal information
- Date of birth: 18 November 1950 (age 75)
- Place of birth: Muhos, Finland
- Position: Forward

Senior career*
Years	Team	Apps	(Gls)
1972	Kotkan Kisailijat		
1973-1974	Kotkan Työväen Palloilijat		
1975-1976	Mikkelin Pallo-Kissat	41	(7)
1977-1984	Kotkan Työväen Palloilijat		

International career
1980	Finland	1	(0)
1980	Finland Olympic	3	(1)

Managerial career
- 1984–1988: Kotkan Työväen Palloilijat
- 2000: Kotkan Työväen Palloilijat
- 2005-2006: Kotkan Työväen Palloilijat
- 2008: Kotkan Työväen Palloilijat
- * Club domestic league appearances and goals

Jouko Alila (born 18 November 1950) is a Finnish former footballer. He competed in the men's tournament at the 1980 Summer Olympics.

He played 144 games and scored 23 goals in Mestaruussarja representing MiPK and KTP. He also played in second and third tiers for KTP and for Kotkan Kisailijat.
