= Fernando Pereira (engineer) =

Spanish academic (1930–2018)

Fernando Pereira Soler
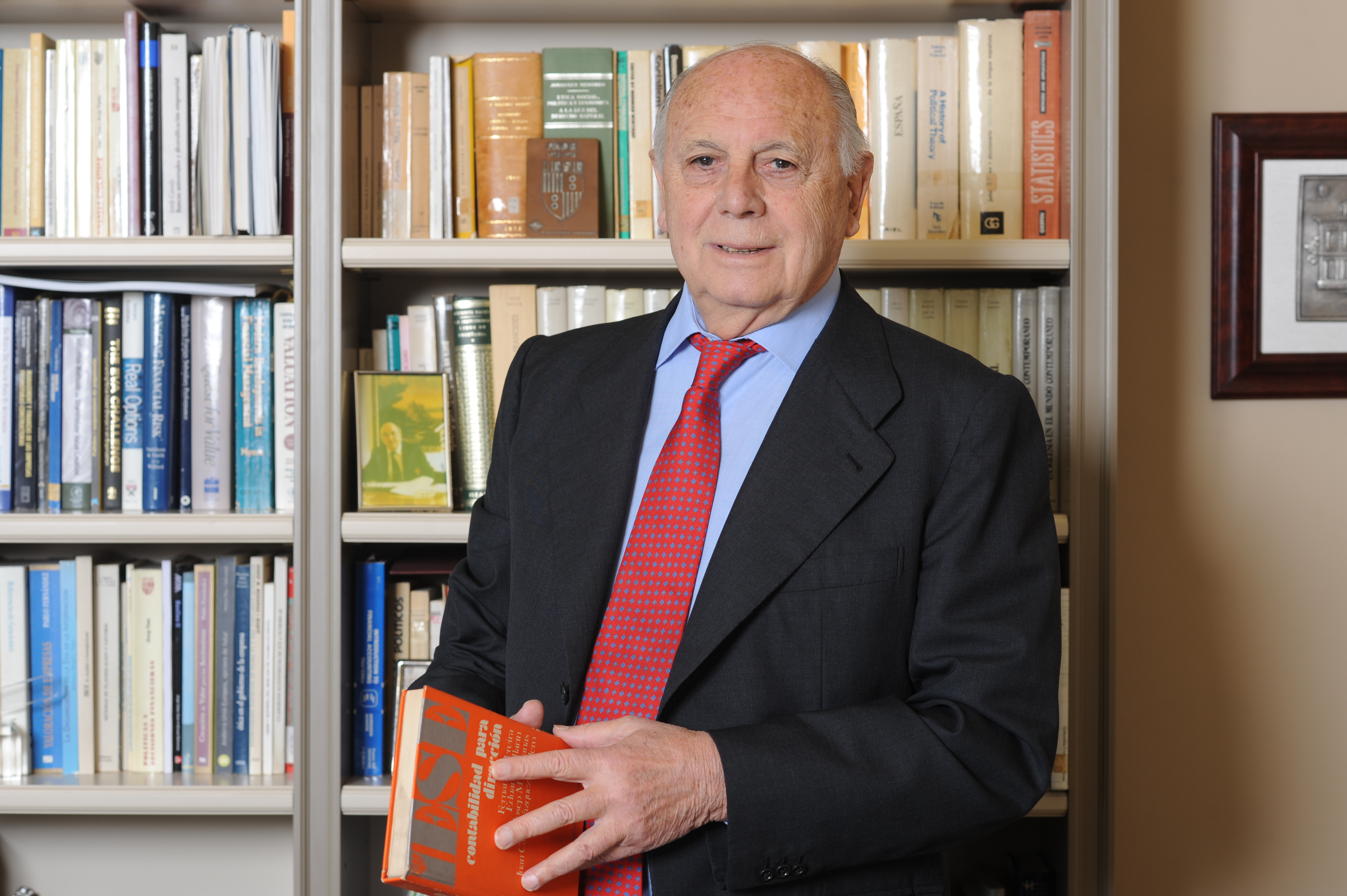
- Born: December 24, 1930; Madrid, Spain
- Died: March 31, 2018 (aged 87); Barcelona, Spain
- Education: Universidad Politécnica de Madrid
- Occupations: Civil engineer, professor, dean

Fernando Pereira Soler (born December 24, 1930, in Madrid) was a civil engineer, a university professor and third dean of IESE Business School. His book "Accounting for Management" was first published in 1970 and has gone through several editions.

== Education ==
Fernando Pereira attended Colegio Nuestra Señora del Pilar in Madrid, before studying engineering at Escuela Técnica Superior de Ingenieros de Caminos, Canales y Puertos of the Universidad Politécnica de Madrid (1951-1956). He graduated from L'École d'Administration des Affaires in Lille in 1959 and attended the Managerial Economics Seminar at the University of California, Berkeley in 1961. He obtained a doctorate in engineering from the Universidad Politécnica de Madrid in 1967.

== Academic career at IESE Business School ==
Fernando Pereira was a key figure in the founding of IESE Business School, along with Antonio Valero Vicente. He moved to Barcelona in 1958 and was part of the founding team that included Félix Huerta Herrero, Anton Wurster, Rafael Termes, Juan Ferrán Nadal and Carlos Cavallé. With Valero, he travelled to many educational institutions in Europe to see first-hand the best practices in business education. During their visit to L'École d'Administration des Affaires in Lille, it was decided that Pereira would stay there to complete his teacher training.[1] A year later, he joined IESE as a professor in the Department of Information and Economic Control.

In addition to his teaching responsibilities, Pereira actively promoted and developed research at IESE, serving as the university's research director (1959-1964) and director of executive education programmes.

After serving on the Board of Directors, he was appointed Dean of the School (1970-1978), succeeding Juan Ginebra Torra, and was known as a leader who listened to others, surrounded himself with a trusted team, and made important decisions collaboratively.

During his tenure, the Harvard-IESE Committee flourished and the IAE Business School in Buenos Aires, which later became part of the Universidad Austral, was founded. He also contributed to the creation of the Instituto Panamericano de Alta Dirección de Empresa (IPADE), which later became part of the Panamerican University. A further landmark of his leadership was the opening of the IESE Madrid campus, in 1974, to promote the education of business leaders and managers in the Spanish capital.

Under his leadership, the Alumni Association grew into a dynamic source of support and advice, and a means of continued contact between current and former students, faculty and academic leadership.

In 1978, for health reasons, he was replaced as Dean of IESE by Juan Antonio Pérez López, but remained on the Board of Governors (1978-1981). He later served as deputy dean under Pedro Nueno (1981-1992).

He loved to read and was a great connoisseur of English writers such as G.K. Chesterton, C.S. Lewis, R. Knox and H. Newman.

== Professor ==
Pereira was a professor of Accounting and Financial Management at IESE for decades, both in the MBA and Executive Education programmes. He was appointed Professor Emeritus in 2001. As a professor, his rhetorical questions and sense of humour captivated a full classroom, and he had a gift for making complex accounting principles accessible and engaging.

His book Accounting for Management is a classic among accounting textbooks. In the prologue, he gives some basic advice on how to solve complicated problems:

«Complex problems are solved with the help of a pencil, an eraser and a sheet of paper”

The book is aimed at anyone who is not a professional accountant but who needs a working knowledge of accounting. While highly practical, it is also academically rigorous, thanks to the author's experience in the private sector and as a professor.

== Publications ==
=== Books ===
- Pereira, F. (1970), Contabilidad para dirección, 1st ed. EUNSA.
- Pereira, F., et al. (1985), Enciclopedia de administración y contabilidad, Desclée de Brouwer, Bilbao.
- Pereira, F., et al. (2012), Contabilidad para dirección, 25th ed., EUNSA.
- Pereira, F., and Grandes, M.J. (2016), Dirección y contabilidad financiera, EUNSA.

=== Chapters in Books ===
- Pereira, F. (1990), "La contabilidad de una empresa industrial,” in F. Pereira, et al., Curso de Contabilidad y Finanzas, vol. 4: Las finanzas en la empresa, Plaza & Janés, (La empresa, dirección y administración), Barcelona, pp. 1–20.
- "Pereira, F. (1997), "La información contable de grupos de sociedades,” in C. García Pont, et al., Gestión de empresas diversificadas, Ediciones Folio, (Biblioteca IESE de Gestión de Empresas, vol. pp. 87–117.
