= Jouko Soini =

Finnish footballer (born 1956)

Personal information
- Date of birth: 2 March 1956 (age 70)
- Place of birth: Helsinki, Finland
- Positions: Defender; midfielder

Senior career*
Years	Team	Apps	(Gls)
1975-1984	Helsingin Jalkapalloklubi	187	(26)
1984	FinnPa	7	(3)

International career
1980	Finland	1	(0)
1980	Finland Olympic	2	(1)
- * Club domestic league appearances and goals

Jouko Soini (born 2 March 1956) is a Finnish former footballer. He competed in the men's tournament at the 1980 Summer Olympics. He also played 1 friendly international for Finland in 1980. At club level he represented Helsingin Jalkapalloklubi for 10 seasons in Mestaruussarja before ending his career at FinnPa in Ykkönen.
