= Roberto Elie =

Venezuelan footballer (born 1959)

Personal information
- Date of birth: 11 May 1959 (age 67)
- Position: Defender

International career
Years	Team	Apps	(Gls)
- Venezuela

Roberto Elie (born 11 May 1959) is a Venezuelan former footballer. He competed in the men's tournament at the 1980 Summer Olympics.
