= Iker Zubizarreta =

Venezuelan footballer (born 1962)

Personal information
- Date of birth: 18 May 1962 (age 64)

International career
Years	Team	Apps	(Gls)
- Venezuela

Iker Zubizarreta (born 18 May 1962) is a Venezuelan footballer. He competed in the men's tournament at the 1980 Summer Olympics.

He is the grandson of Félix Zubizarreta, a footballer who played for Athletic Bilbao in Spain prior to emigrating to South America following the Spanish Civil War. Due to Iker's Basque name and heritage, Athletic were reported to have considered making an approach to sign him, although the club's policy of using local players does not normally include players of the Basque diaspora raised abroad, and no move materialised.
