= Bernard Mutale =

Zambian footballer

Personal information
- Place of birth: Zambia
- Position: Defender

Senior career*
Years	Team	Apps	(Gls)
- Red Arrows

International career
1978–1981	Zambia	1	(0)
- * Club domestic league appearances and goals

Bernard Mutale is a Zambian football defender who played for Zambia in the 1978 African Cup of Nations. He played club football for Red Arrows.
