= Carlos Molinares =

Colombian footballer (born 1956)

Personal information
- Full name: Carlos Molinares Saumeth
- Date of birth: 23 June 1956 (age 70)
- Height: 1.76 m (5 ft 9 in)
- Position: Forward

Senior career*
Years	Team	Apps	(Gls)
- Atlético Junior

International career
- Colombia
- * Club domestic league appearances and goals

Carlos Molinares Saumeth (born 23 June 1956) is a Colombian former footballer who played as a forward. He competed in the men's tournament at the 1980 Summer Olympics. At club level, he represented Atlético Junior. Molinares was known for his speed and his dribbling.

== Personal life ==
Molinares has four children.
