= Kampela Katumba =

Zambian footballer

Personal information
- Position: Defender

International career
Years	Team	Apps	(Gls)
- Zambia

Kampela Katumba is a Zambian footballer. He competed in the men's tournament at the 1980 Summer Olympics.
