= Carlos Valencia (footballer, born 1953) =

Colombian footballer (1953–2017)

Carlos Hernán Valencia (30 December 1953 – 23 April 2017) was a Colombian former football player.

== Club career ==
Born in El Cerrito, Valle del Cauca, Valencia played professional football as a goalkeeper for Deportivo Cali, Deportes Quindío, Deportes Tolima and Unión Magdalena in Colombia. He also played in Venezuela for Aragua FC.

== International career ==
Valencia made several appearances for the senior Colombia national football team, including participating in one qualifying match for the 1982 FIFA World Cup.

He also played for Colombia at the 1980 Olympic Games in Moscow.

== Managerial career ==
After he retired from playing, Valencia became a coach. He was the goalkeeping coach for the Honduras national football team in 2009.
