= Football at the 1980 Summer Olympics =

1980 Men's Olympic football tournament
Tournament details
- Host country: Soviet Union
- Dates: 20 July – 2 August 1980
- Teams: 16 (from 5 confederations)
- Venue: 5 (in 4 host cities)

Final positions
- Champions: Czechoslovakia (1st title)
- Runners-up: East Germany
- Third place: Soviet Union
- Fourth place: Yugoslavia

Tournament statistics
- Matches played: 32
- Goals scored: 82 (2.56 per match)
- Attendance: 1,821,624 (56,926 per match)
- Top scorer: (Soviet Union) Sergey Andreyev (5 goals)

The football tournament at the 1980 Summer Olympics started on 20 July and ended on 2 August. Only one event, the men's tournament, was contested. Seven qualified countries did not participate, joining the American-led boycott in protest of the December 1979 Soviet invasion of Afghanistan.

Sixteen teams were divided into four groups:

- Group A (USSR, Cuba, Venezuela, Zambia)
- Group B (Colombia, Kuwait, Nigeria, Czechoslovakia)
- Group C (Algeria, Spain, GDR, Syria)
- Group D (Costa Rica, Finland, Iraq, Yugoslavia)

In the technical report following the competition, FIFA reported that: "Compared with the 1979 World Youth Tournament in Japan and the 1978 World Cup finals in Argentina, the standard of football at the Olympic Football Tournament was generally of an inferior quality".

The tournament was primarily hosted by Moscow and Leningrad in the Russian SFSR, with some group stage games in Kiev, Ukrainian SSR and Minsk, Byelorussian SSR.

== Venues ==
Moscow
Central Lenin Stadium		Dynamo Stadium
Capacity: 91,251		Capacity: 50,475
Minsk	Leningrad	Kiev
Dinamo Stadium	Kirov Stadium	Republican Stadium
Capacity: 50,125	Capacity: 74,000	Capacity: 100,169

The football tournament was the most attended event on these Olympics: 1,821,624 spectators watched 32 matches of it at the stadiums.

== Qualification ==
Due to the American-led boycott, countries (in brackets) who qualified did not enter the final tournament. Spain sent a team under the IOC flag. The following 16 teams qualified for the 1980 Olympics football tournament:

- Africa (CAF)
  - Algeria
  - Nigeria (replaces Ghana)
  - Zambia (replaces Egypt)
- Asia (AFC)
  - Iraq (replaces Malaysia)
  - Kuwait
  - Syria (replaces Iran)
- North and Central America (CONCACAF)
  - Costa Rica
  - Cuba (replaces United States)
- South America (CONMEBOL)
  - Colombia
  - Venezuela (replaces Argentina)
- Europe (UEFA)
  - Czechoslovakia
  - Finland (replaces Norway)
  - East Germany
  - Spain
  - Yugoslavia
- Hosting nation
  - Soviet Union

== Match officials ==
Africa

- (Algeria) Belaïd Lacarne
- (Nigeria) Bassey Eyo-Honesty
- (Zambia) Nyrenda Chayu

Asia

- (Iraq) Salim Naji Al-Hachami
- (Kuwait) Ali Abdulwahab Al Bannai
- (Syria) Marwan Arafat

North and Central America

- (Costa Rica) Luis Paulino Siles
- (Cuba) Ramón Calderón Castro
- (Mexico) Mario Rubio Vázquez

South America

- (Brazil) Romualdo Arppi Filho
- (Colombia) Guillermo Velásquez
- (Peru) Enrique Labo Revoredo
- (Venezuela) José Castro Lozada

Europe

- (Austria) Franz Wöhrer
- (Czechoslovakia) Vojtěch Christov
- (Finland) Anders Mattsson
- (Italy) Riccardo Lattanzi
- (East Germany) Klaus Scheurell
- (United Kingdom) Bob Valentine
- (Spain) Emilio Guruceta Muro
- (Sweden) Ulf Eriksson
- (Switzerland) André Daina
- (Socialist Federal Republic of Yugoslavia) Marjan Raus
- (Soviet Union) Eldar Azimzade

== Final tournament ==
=== First round ===
==== Group A ====
Team	Pld	W	D	L	GF	GA	GD	Pts
Soviet Union	3	3	0	0	15	1	+14	6
Cuba	3	2	0	1	3	9	−6	4
Venezuela	3	1	0	2	3	7	−4	2
Zambia	3	0	0	3	2	6	−4	0

Source: FIFA
20 July 1980
12:00

Cuba	1–0	Zambia
Roldán 58'	Report

Kirov Stadium, Leningrad
Attendance: 100,000
Referee: Marijan Raus (Yugoslavia)

20 July 1980
12:00

Soviet Union	4–0	Venezuela
Andreyev 3'; Cherenkov 25'; Gavrilov 34'; Hovhannisyan 51'	Report

Lenin Stadium, Moscow
Attendance: 80,000
Referee: Franz Woehrer (Austria)

22 July 1980
12:00

Cuba	2–1	Venezuela
Hernández 49'; Núñez 71'	Report	Zubizarreta 68'

Kirov Stadium, Leningrad
Attendance: 70,000
Referee: Emilio Guruceta Muro (Spain)

22 July 1980
12:00

Soviet Union	3–1	Zambia
Khidiyatullin 9', 51'; Cherenkov 87'	Report	Chitalu 13'

Lenin Stadium, Moscow
Attendance: 80,000
Referee: Marwan Arafat (Syria)

24 July 1980
12:00

Soviet Union	8–0	Cuba
Andreyev 8', 27', 44'; Romantsev 20'; Shavlo 43'; Cherenkov 55'; Gavrilov 75'; Bessonov 77'	Report

Dinamo Stadium, Moscow
Attendance: 52,000
Referee: Bob Valentine (Great Britain)

24 July 1980
12:00

Venezuela	2–1	Zambia
Zubizarreta 86'; Elie 90' (pen.)	Report	Chitalu 73'

Kirov Stadium, Leningrad
Attendance: 80,000
Referee: Luis Paulino Siles (Costa Rica)

==== Group B ====
Team	Pld	W	D	L	GF	GA	GD	Pts
Czechoslovakia	3	1	2	0	4	1	+3	4
Kuwait	3	1	2	0	4	2	+2	4
Colombia	3	1	1	1	2	4	−2	3
Nigeria	3	0	1	2	2	5	−3	1

Source: FIFA
21 July 1980
12:00

Czechoslovakia	3–0	Colombia
Pokluda 14'; Berger 18'; Vízek 85'	Report

Kirov Stadium, Leningrad
Referee: Belaid Lacarne (Argelia)

21 July 1980
12:00

Kuwait	3–1	Nigeria
Al-Dakhil 16', 40', 85' (pen.)	Report	Mubarak 25' (o.g.)

Dinamo Stadium, Moscow
Referee: Klaus Scheurell (East Germany)

23 July 1980
12:00

Colombia	1–1	Kuwait
Molinares 73'	Report	Yaqoub 64'

Dinamo Stadium, Moscow
Referee: Anders Mattson (Finland)

23 July 1980
12:00

Czechoslovakia	1–1	Nigeria
Vízek 25'	Report	Nwosu 84'

Kirov Stadium, Leningrad
Referee: Enrique Labo Revoredo (Peru)

25 July 1980
12:00

Colombia	1–0	Nigeria
Cardona 55'	Report

Dinamo Stadium, Moscow
Referee: Salim Naji Al-Hachami (Iraq)

25 July 1980
12:00

Czechoslovakia	0–0	Kuwait
	Report

Kirov Stadium, Leningrad
Referee: Riccardo Lattanzi (Italy)

==== Group C ====
Team	Pld	W	D	L	GF	GA	GD	Pts
East Germany	3	2	1	0	7	1	+6	5
Algeria	3	1	1	1	4	2	+2	3
Spain	3	0	3	0	2	2	0	3
Syria	3	0	1	2	0	8	−8	1

Source: FIFA
20 July 1980
12:00

East Germany	1–1	Spain
Kühn 49'	Report	Marcos 50'

Republican Stadium, Kiev
Attendance: 100,000
Referee: Ulf Eriksson (Sweden)

20 July 1980
12:00

Algeria	3–0	Syria
Belloumi 36'; Madjer 48'; Merzekane 73' (pen.)	Report

Dinamo Stadium, Minsk
Referee: Vojtech Christov (Czechoslovakia)

22 July 1980
12:00

East Germany	1–0	Algeria
Terletzki 61'	Report

Republican Stadium, Kiev
Attendance: 70,000
Referee: Romualdo Arppi Filho (Brazil)

22 July 1980
12:00

Spain	0–0	Syria
	Report

Dinamo Stadium, Minsk
Referee: José Castro Lozada (Venezuela)

24 July 1980
12:00

Spain	1–1	Algeria
Rincón 38'	Report	Belloumi 63'

Dinamo Stadium, Minsk
Referee: Eldar Azimzade (Soviet Union)

24 July 1980
12:00

East Germany	5–0	Syria
Hause 6'; Netz 25', 45'; Peter 75'; Terletzki 82'	Report

Republican Stadium, Kiev
Attendance: 80,000
Referee: Ulf Eriksson (Sweden)

==== Group D ====
Team	Pld	W	D	L	GF	GA	GD	Pts
Yugoslavia	3	2	1	0	6	3	+3	5
Iraq	3	1	2	0	4	1	+3	4
Finland	3	1	1	1	3	2	+1	3
Costa Rica	3	0	0	3	2	9	−7	0

Source: FIFA
21 July 1980
12:00

Yugoslavia	2–0	Finland
Šećerbegović 56'; Šestić 58'	Report

Dinamo Stadium, Minsk
Referee: Mario Rubio Vázquez (Mexico)

21 July 1980
12:00

Iraq	3–0	Costa Rica
Ahmed 45'; Saeed 49'; Hassan 75'	Report

Republican Stadium, Kiev
Referee: Nyirenda Chayu (Zambia)

23 July 1980
12:00

Yugoslavia	3–2	Costa Rica
Zlatko Vujović 6', 54'; Primorac 24'	Report	White 35'; Arroyo 90'

Dinamo Stadium, Minsk
Referee: Bassey Eyo-Honesty (Nigeria)

23 July 1980
12:00

Finland	0–0	Iraq
	Report

Republican Stadium, Kiev
Attendance: 40,000
Referee: Ramón Calderón Castro (Cuba)

25 July 1980
12:00

Finland	3–0	Costa Rica
Tissari 18'; Alila 58'; Soini 88'	Report

Republican Stadium, Kiev
Attendance: 50,000
Referee: Ali Albannai Abdulwahab (Kuwait)

25 July 1980
12:00

Yugoslavia	1–1	Iraq
Zoran Vujović 63'	Report	Hassan 61'

Dinamo Stadium, Minsk
Referee: André Daina (Switzerland)

=== Bracket ===
Quarter-finals
27 July – Moscow
Soviet Union	2
Kuwait	1
27 July – Kiev
East Germany	4
Iraq	0
27 July – Leningrad
Czechoslovakia	3
Cuba	0
27 July – Minsk
Yugoslavia	3
Algeria	0

Semi-finals
29 July – Moscow
Soviet Union	0
East Germany	1
29 July – Moscow
Czechoslovakia	2
Yugoslavia	0

Final
2 August – Moscow
East Germany	0
Czechoslovakia	1
Bronze medal match
1 August – Moscow
Soviet Union	2
Yugoslavia	0

=== Quarter-finals ===
27 July 1980
12:00

Yugoslavia	3–0	Algeria
Miročević 5'; Šestić 19'; Zoran Vujović 70'	Report

Dinamo Stadium, Minsk
Referee: Klaus Scheurell (East Germany)

27 July 1980
12:00

Soviet Union	2–1	Kuwait
Cherenkov 30'; Gavrilov 51'	Report	Yaqoub 59'

Dinamo Stadium, Moscow
Attendance: 48,000
Referee: Mario Rubio Vázquez (Mexico)

27 July 1980
12:00

Czechoslovakia	3–0	Cuba
Vízek 29', 59'; Pokluda 90'	Report

Kirov Stadium, Leningrad
Referee: Enrique Labo Revoredo (Peru)

27 July 1980
12:00

East Germany	4–0	Iraq
Schnuphase 4' (pen.); Netz 11'; Steinbach 17'; Terletzki 22'	Report

Republican Stadium, Kiev
Attendance: 48,000
Referee: Romualdo Arppi Filho (Brazil)

=== Semi-finals ===
29 July 1980
12:00

Soviet Union	0–1	East Germany
	Report	Netz 16'

Lenin Stadium, Moscow
Attendance: 95,000
Referee: Ulf Eriksson (Sweden)

29 July 1980
13:00

Czechoslovakia	2–0	Yugoslavia
Lička 4'; Šreiner 18'	Report

Dinamo Stadium, Moscow
Attendance: 48,000
Referee: Franz Woehrer (Austria)

=== Bronze Medal match ===
1 August 1980
12:00

Soviet Union	2–0	Yugoslavia
Hovhannisyan 67'; Andreyev 82'	Report

Dinamo Stadium, Moscow
Attendance: 45,000
Referee: Bob Valentine (Great Britain)

=== Gold Medal match ===
1980 Summer Olympics Football Final
2 August 1980
12:00

Czechoslovakia	1–0	East Germany
Svoboda 77'	Report

Lenin Stadium, Moscow
Attendance: 70,000
Referee: Eldar Azimzade (Soviet Union)

Team details

Czechoslovakia
East Germany

GK	1	Stanislav Seman
DF	3	Josef Mazura
DF	2	Luděk Macela
DF	4	Libor Radimec
DF	5	Zdeněk Rygel
MF	14	Oldřich Rott
MF	8	Jan Berger (Sent - Off)
MF	16	František Štambachr
FW	7	Ladislav Vízek	Substituted off
FW	11	Werner Lička
FW	10	Lubomír Pokluda	Substituted off
Substitutes:
FW	9	Jindřich Svoboda		Substituted on
MF	6	Petr Němec		Substituted on
Manager:
(Czechoslovakia) František Havránek

GK	1	Bodo Rudwaleit
DF	13	Matthias Müller
DF	3	Lothar Hause	Substituted off
DF	12	Norbert Trieloff
DF	2	Artur Ullrich
MF	6	Rüdiger Schnuphase
MF	7	Frank Terletzki
MF	8	Wolfgang Steinbach (Sent - Off)
MF	5	Frank Baum
FW	17	Wolf-Rüdiger Netz
FW	11	Dieter Kühn
Substitutes:
MF	14	Matthias Liebers	Substituted on
Manager:
(East Germany) Rudolf Krause

The final was played in a hard rain for the third straight Olympics. Both teams played with ten players after the 58th minute after one player from each team was red-carded.

== Medalists ==
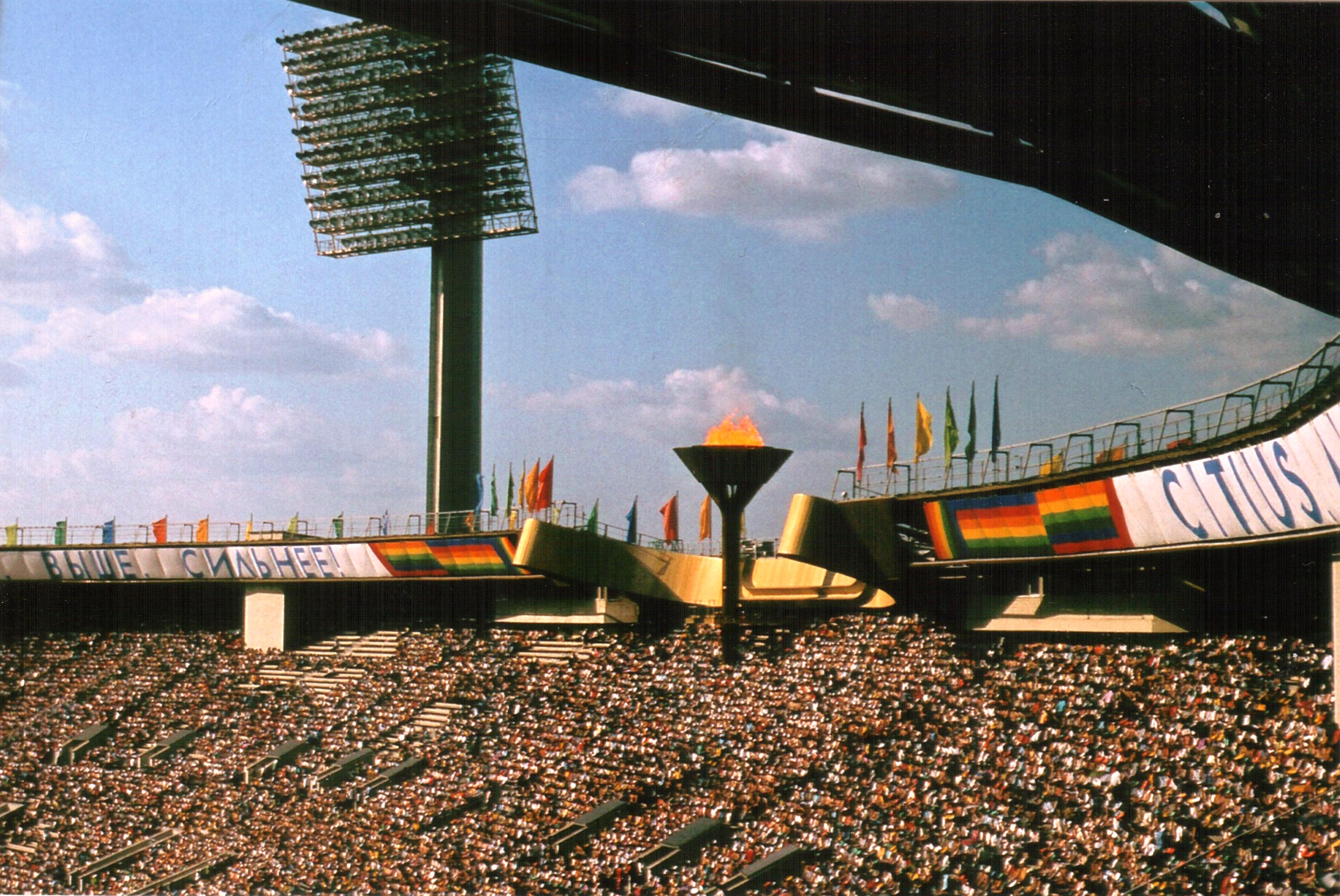
View of the stadium from the final

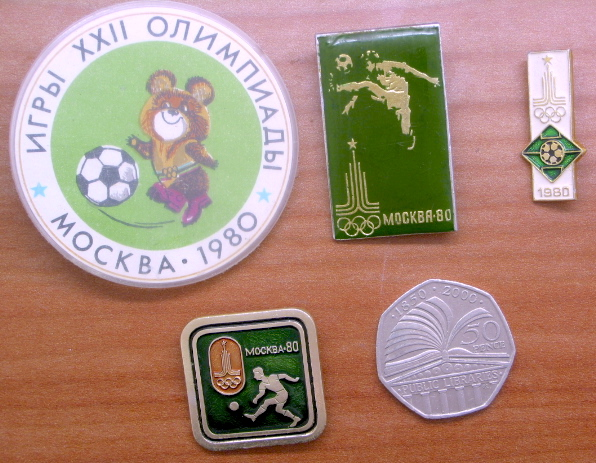
Olympic football pins from 1980

Gold:	Silver:	Bronze:
Czechoslovakia Stanislav Seman; Luděk Macela; Josef Mazura; Libor Radimec; Zdeněk Rygel; Petr Němec; Ladislav Vízek; Jan Berger; Jindřich Svoboda; Lubomír Pokluda; Werner Lička; Rostislav Václavíček; Jaroslav Netolička; Oldřich Rott; Zdeněk Šreiner; František Štambacher; František Kunzo	East Germany Bodo Rudwaleit; Artur Ullrich; Lothar Hause; Frank Uhlig; Frank Baum; Rüdiger Schnuphase; Frank Terletzki; Wolfgang Steinbach; Jürgen Bähringer; Werner Peter; Dieter Kühn; Norbert Trieloff; Matthias Müller; Matthias Liebers; Bernd Jakubowski; Wolf-Rüdiger Netz	Soviet Union Rinat Dasaev; Tengiz Sulakvelidze; Alexandre Chivadze; Vagiz Khidiyatullin; Oleg Romantsev; Sergey Shavlo; Sergey Andreev; Vladimir Bessonov; Yuri Gavrilov; Fyodor Cherenkov; Valeri Gazzaev; Vladimir Pilguj; Sergej Baltacha; Sergei Nikulin; Khoren Hovhannisyan; Alexandr Prokopenko; Revaz Chelebadze

== Goalscorers ==
With five goals, Sergey Andreyev of Soviet Union was the top scorer of the tournament. In total, 82 goals were scored by 52 different players, with only one of them credited as own goal.

5 goals

- (Soviet Union) Sergey Andreyev

4 goals

- (Czechoslovakia) Ladislav Vízek
- (East Germany) Wolf-Rüdiger Netz
- (Soviet Union) Fyodor Cherenkov

3 goals

- (East Germany) Frank Terletzki
- (Kuwait) Faisal Al-Dakhil
- (Soviet Union) Yuri Gavrilov

2 goals

- (Algeria) Lakhdar Belloumi
- (Czechoslovakia) Lubomír Pokluda
- (Iraq) Falah Hassan
- (Kuwait) Jasem Yaqoub
- (Soviet Union) Vagiz Khidiyatullin
- (Soviet Union) Khoren Hovhannisyan
- (Venezuela) Iker Zubizarreta
- (Socialist Federal Republic of Yugoslavia) Miloš Šestić
- (Socialist Federal Republic of Yugoslavia) Zlatko Vujović
- (Socialist Federal Republic of Yugoslavia) Zoran Vujović
- (Zambia) Godfrey Chitalu

1 goal

- (Algeria) Rabah Madjer
- (Algeria) Chaabane Merzekane
- (Colombia) Benjamin Cardona
- (Colombia) Carlos Molinares
- (Costa Rica) Omar Arroyo
- (Costa Rica) Jorge White
- (Cuba) Luis Hernández
- (Cuba) Ramón Núñez
- (Cuba) Andrés Roldán
- (Czechoslovakia) Jan Berger
- (Czechoslovakia) Werner Lička
- (Czechoslovakia) Zdeněk Šreiner
- (Czechoslovakia) Jindřich Svoboda
- (Finland) Jouko Alila
- (Finland) Jouko Soini
- (Finland) Ari Tissari
- (East Germany) Lothar Hause
- (East Germany) Dieter Kühn
- (East Germany) Werner Peter
- (East Germany) Rüdiger Schnuphase
- (East Germany) Wolfgang Steinbach
- (Iraq) Hadi Ahmed
- (Iraq) Hussein Saeed
- (Nigeria) Henry Nwosu
- (Spain) Marcos Alonso Peña
- (Spain) Hipólito Rincón
- (Soviet Union) Oleg Romantsev
- (Soviet Union) Sergey Shavlo
- (Soviet Union) Volodymyr Bessonov
- (Venezuela) Robert Elie
- (Socialist Federal Republic of Yugoslavia) Dževad Šećerbegović
- (Socialist Federal Republic of Yugoslavia) Boro Primorac
- (Socialist Federal Republic of Yugoslavia) Ante Miročević

Own goals

- (Kuwait) Mahboub Mubarak (playing against Nigeria)

== Final ranking ==
Below the final ranking after the end of the tournament.

Pos	Team	Pld	W	D	L	GF	GA	GD	Pts
1	Czechoslovakia	6	4	2	0	10	1	+9	10
2	East Germany	6	4	1	1	12	2	+10	9
3	Soviet Union	6	5	0	1	19	3	+16	10
4	Yugoslavia	6	3	1	2	9	7	+2	7
5	Kuwait	4	1	2	1	5	4	+1	4
6	Iraq	4	1	2	1	4	5	−1	4
7	Cuba	4	2	0	2	3	12	−9	4
8	Algeria	4	1	1	2	4	5	−1	3
9	Finland	3	1	1	1	3	2	+1	3
10	Spain	3	0	3	0	2	2	0	3
11	Colombia	3	1	1	1	2	4	−2	3
12	Venezuela	3	1	0	2	3	7	−4	2
13	Nigeria	3	0	1	2	2	5	−3	1
14	Syria	3	0	1	2	0	8	−8	1
15	Zambia	3	0	0	3	2	6	−4	0
16	Costa Rica	3	0	0	3	2	9	−7	0
