= 1981 CONCACAF Championship squads =

These are the squads for the countries that played in the 1981 CONCACAF Championship.

The age listed for each player is on 1 November 1981, the first day of the tournament. The numbers of caps and goals listed for each player do not include any matches played after the start of the tournament. The club listed is the club for which the player last played a competitive match before the tournament. The nationality for each club reflects the national association (not the league) to which the club is affiliated. A flag is included for coaches who are of a different nationality than their own national team.

Every nation besides Cuba fields foreign players with Canada (14), El Salvador (2), Haiti (4), Honduras (1) and Mexico (1).

== Canada ==
Head coach: Barrie Clarke

No.	Pos.	Player	Date of birth (age)	Caps	Club
1	GK	Tony Chursky	13 June 1953 (aged 28)		(Canada) Toronto Blizzard
2	DF	Robert Iarusci	8 November 1954 (aged 26)		(United States) New York Cosmos
3	DF	Bruce Wilson	20 June 1951 (aged 30)		(Canada) Toronto Blizzard
4	FW	Mike McLenaghen	10 June 1954 (aged 27)	3	(United States) Los Angeles Aztecs
5	DF	Bob Lenarduzzi	1 May 1955 (aged 26)		(Canada) Vancouver Whitecaps
6	DF	Ian Bridge	18 September 1959 (aged 22)		(United States) Seattle Sounders
7	FW	Mike Stojanović	26 January 1946 (aged 35)	3	(United States) San Diego Sockers
8	DF	Brian Gant	23 April 1952 (aged 29)		(United States) Portland Timbers
9	FW	Dale Mitchell	21 April 1958 (aged 23)		(United States) Portland Timbers
10	FW	Wes McLeod	24 October 1957 (aged 24)		(United States) Tampa Bay Rowdies
11	FW	Gordon Sweetzer	27 January 1957 (aged 24)		(England) Brentford
12	DF	Terry Moore	2 June 1958 (aged 23)		(United States) Tampa Bay Rowdies
14	MF	Gerry Gray	20 January 1961 (aged 20)	22	(Canada) Vancouver Whitecaps
15	MF	Bob Bolitho	20 July 1955 (aged 26)		(United States) Fort Lauderdale Strikers
16	MF	Mike Sweeney	25 December 1959 (aged 21)		(Canada) Edmonton Drillers
17	FW	John McGrane	24 October 1957 (aged 24)		(United States) Los Angeles Aztecs
18	FW	Frank Ciaccia	11 September 1959 (aged 22)		(Canada) Toronto Blizzard
19	MF	Branko Šegota	8 June 1961 (aged 20)		(United States) Fort Lauderdale Strikers
20	MF	Bruce Miller	23 May 1957 (aged 24)		(Canada) Vancouver Pegasus
21	MF	Darren Poole	27 October 1962 (aged 19)		(Canada) Edmonton Drillers
22	GK	Chris Turner	1 February 1961 (aged 20)		(United States) Los Angeles Aztecs
23	GK	Tino Lettieri	27 September 1957 (aged 24)	21	(United States) Minnesota Strikers

== Cuba ==
Head coach: (Hungary) Tibor Ivanics

No.	Pos.	Player	Date of birth (age)	Caps	Club
1	GK	José Francisco Reinoso	20 May 1950 (aged 31)		(Cuba) Villa Clara
2	DF	Francisco López Ríos	24 August 1957 (aged 24)		(Cuba) La Habana
3	DF	Francisco Carranza	15 September 1960 (aged 21)		(Cuba) Cienfuegos
4	DF	Luis Sánchez	23 February 1952 (aged 29)		(Cuba) La Habana
5	DF	Luis Dreke	9 July 1953 (aged 28)		(Cuba) Matanzas
7	MF	Andrés Roldán	28 February 1951 (aged 30)		(Cuba) Cienfuegos
8	DF	Amado Povea	30 April 1955 (aged 26)		(Cuba) Pinar del Río
9	MF	Dagoberto Lara	16 April 1953 (aged 28)		(Cuba) Cienfuegos
10	FW	Ramón Núñez	19 April 1953 (aged 28)		(Cuba) Las Tunas
11	FW	Francisco Fariñas	2 April 1950 (aged 31)		(Cuba) La Habana
13	MF	Jorge Maya	17 August 1959 (aged 22)		(Cuba) Villa Clara
14	MF	Regino Delgado	7 September 1956 (aged 25)		(Cuba) Villa Clara
15	MF	Carlos González Acosta	23 October 1964 (aged 17)		(Cuba) La Habana
17	DF	Carlos Loredo	14 October 1951 (aged 30)		(Cuba) La Habana
18	FW	Jorge Luis Rodríguez	2 April 1958 (aged 23)		(Cuba) Camagüey
19	FW	Roberto Pereira	23 September 1952 (aged 29)		(Cuba) Villa Clara
20	GK	Hugo Madera	24 November 1950 (aged 30)		(Cuba) Camagüey
21	GK	Calixto Martínez	14 October 1952 (aged 29)		(Cuba) Pinar del Río

== El Salvador ==
Head coach: Pipo Rodríguez

No.	Pos.	Player	Date of birth (age)	Caps	Club
1	GK	Luis Guevara Mora	2 September 1961 (aged 20)		(El Salvador) Platense
2	DF	Mario Castillo	30 October 1951 (aged 30)	0	(El Salvador) Santiagueño
3	DF	José Francisco Jovel	26 May 1951 (aged 30)	0	(El Salvador) Águila
4	DF	Carlos Recinos	30 June 1950 (aged 31)	0	(El Salvador) FAS
5	DF	Ramón Fagoaga	12 January 1952 (aged 29)	0	(El Salvador) Atlético Marte
6	MF	Juan Quinteros	20 March 1947 (aged 34)		(El Salvador) Juventud Olímpica
7	MF	Silvio Aquino	30 June 1949 (aged 32)	?	(El Salvador) Alianza
8	MF	José Luis Rugamas	5 June 1953 (aged 28)	0	(El Salvador) Atlético Marte
9	MF	Joaquín Ventura	27 October 1956 (aged 25)	0	(El Salvador) Santiagueño
10	MF	Norberto Huezo (captain)	6 June 1956 (aged 25)	0	(El Salvador) Atlético Marte
11	FW	Mágico González	13 March 1958 (aged 23)	0	(El Salvador) FAS
12	DF	Francisco Osorto	20 March 1957 (aged 24)	0	(El Salvador) Santiagueño
13	FW	Mauricio Quintanilla	19 January 1954 (aged 27)	0	(Guatemala) Xelajú
14	GK	Eduardo Hernández	31 January 1958 (aged 23)	?	(El Salvador) Santiagueño
15	FW	José Escamilla	25 February 1956 (aged 25)	0	(El Salvador) Santiagueño
16	MF	Mauricio Alfaro	13 February 1956 (aged 25)	0	(El Salvador) Platense Municipal
17	MF	Miguel González Barillas	5 May 1951 (aged 30)	0	(El Salvador) Atlético Marte
18	FW	Ever Hernández	11 December 1958 (aged 22)	0	(El Salvador) Santiagueño
19	DF	Miguel Ángel Díaz	27 January 1957 (aged 24)	0	(El Salvador) CD Chalatenango
20	FW	Oscar Gustavo Guerrero	10 April 1954 (aged 27)	0	(El Salvador) Independiente de San Vicente
21	DF	Jaime Rodríguez	17 January 1959 (aged 22)	0	(West Germany) Bayer Uerdingen
22	GK	Carlos Eduardo Rivera	4 January 1959 (aged 22)	0	(El Salvador) Independiente de San Vicente

== Haiti ==
Head coach: Antoine Tassy

No.	Pos.	Player	Date of birth (age)	Caps	Club
1	GK	Wilner Piquant	12 October 1949 (aged 32)		(Haiti) Aigle Noir
2	DF	Daniel Cadet	4 January 1960 (aged 21)		(Haiti) Racing Haïtien
3	DF	Reginald Vielot			(Haiti) Victory
4	DF	Guy Allen			(Haiti) Victory
5	DF	Arsène Auguste	3 February 1951 (aged 30)	1	(United States) Fort Lauderdale Strikers
6	DF	Shiller Mondesir			(Haiti) Violette
7	MF	Frantz Mathieu	23 December 1952 (aged 28)		(United States) Chicago Sting
8	MF	Gerald Romulus			(Haiti) Racing Haïtien
9	FW	Fritz Bobo			(Haiti) Aigle Noir
10	FW	Emmanuel Sanon	25 June 1951 (aged 30)		(United States) San Diego Sockers
11	MF	Ernst Jean-Baptiste	18 April 1956 (aged 25)		(United States) New England Sharks
12	FW	Jean-Joseph Mathelier			(Haiti) Aigle Noir
13	FW	Carmin Velima			(Haiti) Don Bosco
14	DF	Frantz St. Lot	13 December 1950 (aged 30)		(United States) New York Arrows
15	FW	Serge Crispin			(Haiti) Victory
16	DF	Jean-Paul Pierre-Louis			(Haiti) Racing Haïtien
17	FW	Carlo Brévil			(Haiti) Violette
18	FW	Maxime Auguste			(Haiti) Don Bosco
19	DF	Jean-Jacques Louis			(Haiti) Racing Haïtien
20	FW	Hugo Pierre	5 March 1949 (aged 32)		(Haiti) Violette
21	FW	Kelsin Thomas			(Haiti) Aigle Noir
22	GK	Gérard Joseph	22 October 1949 (aged 32)	?	(Haiti) Racing Haïtien

== Honduras ==
Head coach: José de la Paz Herrera

No.	Pos.	Player	Date of birth (age)	Caps	Club
1	GK	Julio César Arzú	5 June 1954 (aged 27)	0	(Honduras) Real España
2	DF	Efraín Gutiérrez	7 May 1954 (aged 27)	0	(Honduras) Universidad
3	DF	Jaime Villegas	5 July 1950 (aged 31)	0	(Honduras) Real España
4	DF	Fernando Bulnes	21 October 1946 (aged 35)	0	(Honduras) Olimpia
5	DF	Allan Costly	13 December 1954 (aged 26)	0	(Honduras) Real España
6	MF	Ramón Maradiaga (captain)	30 October 1954 (aged 27)	0	(Honduras) Motagua
7	FW	Eduardo Laing	27 December 1958 (aged 22)	0	(Honduras) Platense
8	MF	Francisco Toledo	30 September 1959 (aged 22)	?	(Honduras) Marathón
9	FW	Jorge Urquía	19 September 1946 (aged 35)		(Honduras) Olimpia
10	FW	José Figueroa	15 December 1959 (aged 21)	0	(Honduras) Vida
11	MF	David Bueso	5 May 1955 (aged 26)	?	(Honduras) Motagua
12	MF	José Luis Cruz	2 February 1952 (aged 29)		(Honduras) Motagua
13	DF	Héctor Zelaya	12 July 1957 (aged 24)	0	(Honduras) Motagua
14	DF	Hernán García Martínez	12 July 1952 (aged 29)	0	(Honduras) Marathón
15	MF	Juan Cruz	24 June 1959 (aged 22)	0	(Honduras) Pumas UNAH
16	FW	Júnior Costly	17 August 1959 (aged 22)		(Honduras) Real España
17	MF	Carlos Caballero	5 December 1958 (aged 22)	0	(Honduras) Real España
18	DF	Domingo Drummond	14 April 1957 (aged 24)	0	(Honduras) Platense
19	MF	Roberto Bailey	10 August 1952 (aged 29)	?	(Honduras) Marathón
20	MF	Salvador Bernárdez	6 January 1954 (aged 27)	?	(United States) Greek-American Athletic Club
21	GK	Jimmy Steward	9 December 1946 (aged 34)	?	(Honduras) Real España
22	GK	Oscar Banegas	1964 (aged 17)	?	(Honduras) Olimpia

== Mexico ==
Head coach: Raúl Cárdenas

No.	Pos.	Player	Date of birth (age)	Caps	Club
1	GK	Francisco Castrejón	11 June 1947 (aged 34)	13	(Mexico) Atlas
2	GK	Prudencio Cortés	18 November 1951 (aged 29)	13	(Mexico) Tecos UAG
3	GK	Ignacio Rodríguez	13 August 1956 (aged 25)	11	(Mexico) Atlante
4	DF	Pareja López	12 August 1955 (aged 26)		(Mexico) Pumas UNAM
5	DF	Mario Trejo	11 February 1956 (aged 25)		(Mexico) América
6	DF	Rafael Toribio	21 August 1958 (aged 23)		(Mexico) Cruz Azul
7	DF	Juan Manuel Álvarez	12 April 1948 (aged 33)		(Mexico) Tecos UAG
8	DF	Alfredo Tena	21 November 1956 (aged 24)	5	(Mexico) América
9	DF	Gustavo Vargas López	24 January 1955 (aged 26)	5	(Mexico) Pumas UNAM
10	DF	Fernando Quirarte	17 May 1956 (aged 25)	30	(Mexico) Guadalajara
11	MF	Tomás Boy	28 June 1951 (aged 30)		(Mexico) Tigres UANL
12	MF	Leonardo Cuéllar (captain)	14 January 1952 (aged 29)		(Mexico) Atletas Campesinos
13	MF	Manuel Manzo	10 February 1952 (aged 29)		(Mexico) Pumas UNAM
14	MF	Guillermo Mendizábal	8 October 1954 (aged 27)		(Mexico) Cruz Azul
15	MF	Enrique López Zarza	25 October 1957 (aged 24)	5	(Mexico) Pumas UNAM
16	MF	Pedro Munguía	29 July 1958 (aged 23)	5	(Mexico) Toluca
17	MF	Manuel Negrete	15 May 1959 (aged 22)		(Mexico) Pumas UNAM
18	FW	Ricardo Castro Valenzuela	1 August 1955 (aged 26)		(Mexico) Pumas UNAM
19	FW	Sergio Lira	24 August 1957 (aged 24)		(Mexico) Atlante
20	FW	Jaime Pajarito	12 April 1955 (aged 26)		(Mexico) Guadalajara
21	FW	Adrián Camacho	5 March 1957 (aged 24)		(Mexico) Cruz Azul
22	FW	Hugo Sánchez	11 July 1958 (aged 23)		(Spain) Atlético Madrid
