= Football at the 1978 Central American and Caribbean Games =

1978 Central American and Caribbean Games Football Tournament
Fútbol en los Juegos Centroamericanos y del Caribe 1978

Tournament details
- Host country: Colombia
- City: Medellín
- Dates: 8–21 July 1978
- Teams: 10 (from 2 confederations)
- Venue: 1 (in 1 host city)

Final positions
- Champions: Cuba (4th title)
- Runners-up: Venezuela
- Third place: Bermuda
- Fourth place: Mexico

Tournament statistics
- Top scorer(s): (Bermuda) Ralph Bean (Cuba) Roberto Pereira (7 goals)

Football was contested for men only at the 1978 Central American and Caribbean Games in Medellín, Colombia. Colombia was disqualified from the tournament.

== Participants ==
- Bermuda
- Colombia (Hosts) later Disqualified
- Cuba
- Dominican Republic
- El Salvador
- Mexico
- Netherlands Antilles
- Panama
- Puerto Rico
- Trinidad and Tobago
- Venezuela

== Group stage ==
=== Group A ===
Pos	Team	Pld	W	D	L	GF	GA	GD	Pts	Qualification
1	Cuba	5	5	0	0	16	1	+15	10	Knockout stage
2	Bermuda	5	3	1	1	12	7	+5	7	Knockout stage
3	Trinidad and Tobago	5	3	0	2	14	9	+5	6	
4	Panama	5	2	1	2	13	6	+7	5	
5	El Salvador	5	1	0	4	2	21	−19	2	
6	Netherlands Antilles	5	0	0	5	3	16	−13	0	

8 July 1978

Cuba	6–0	El Salvador
Masso 15', 37'; Roldán 27'; Pereira 41', 88'; Núñez 83'	Report

Atanasio Girardot, Medellín, Colombia
8 July 1978

Netherlands Antilles	1–3	Trinidad and Tobago
Bislip	Report	Chinapoo

Atanasio Girardot, Medellín, Colombia
8 July 1978

Panama	1–1	Bermuda
Montilla	Report	Astwood

Atanasio Girardot, Medellín, Colombia
10 July 1978

El Salvador	1–6	Trinidad and Tobago
Villatoro 80'	Report	Curtis 18'; Laforest 24'; Chinapoo 32'; Joseph 37', 43'; Greene 85'

Atanasio Girardot, Medellín, Colombia
10 July 1978

Panama	6–1	Netherlands Antilles
Flores 17'; Sánchez 61', 89'; Hernández 75'; Montilla 77', 78'	Report	Bislip 86'

Atanasio Girardot, Medellín, Colombia
10 July 1978

Cuba	4–0	Bermuda
Núñez 33', 89'; Rivero 50' (pen.); Pereira 59'	Report

Atanasio Girardot, Medellín, Colombia
12 July 1978

El Salvador	0–5	Panama
	Report	Sánchez 14'; Hernández 21'; Montilla 49', 59'; Valdez 75'

Atanasio Girardot, Medellín, Colombia
12 July 1978

Bermuda	4–0	Netherlands Antilles
Bean; Brangman; Lewis	Report

Atanasio Girardot, Medellín, Colombia
12 July 1978

Cuba	3–0	Trinidad and Tobago
Delgado; Núñez; Fuentes	Report

Atanasio Girardot, Medellín, Colombia
14 July 1978

Trinidad and Tobago	3–1	Panama
Laforest 12' (pen.); Curtis 34'; Chinapoo 42'	Report	Hernández 2'

Atanasio Girardot, Medellín, Colombia
14 July 1978

Cuba	2–1	Netherlands Antilles
Pereira 56', 67'	Report	Ruiz 39'

Atanasio Girardot, Medellín, Colombia
14 July 1978

Bermuda	4–0	El Salvador
Bean; Brangman	Report

Atanasio Girardot, Medellín, Colombia
16 July 1978

Netherlands Antilles	0–1	El Salvador
Arrue 8'	Report

Atanasio Girardot, Medellín, Colombia
16 July 1978

Trinidad and Tobago	2–3	Bermuda
Joseph; John	Report	Brangman; Bean

Atanasio Girardot, Medellín, Colombia
16 July 1978

Cuba	1–0	Panama
Masso 52'	Report

Atanasio Girardot, Medellín, Colombia

=== Group B ===
Pos	Team	Pld	W	D	L	GF	GA	GD	Pts	Qualification
1	Venezuela	4	3	1	0	7	1	+6	7	Knockout stage
2	Mexico	4	2	2	0	10	1	+9	6	Knockout stage
3	Dominican Republic	4	1	2	1	2	6	−4	4	
4	Puerto Rico	4	1	1	2	0	11	−11	3	
5	Colombia	4	0	0	4	0	0	0	0	

9 July 1978

Dominican Republic	1–1	Mexico
Martínez 61'	Report	Morales 30'

Atanasio Girardot, Medellín, Colombia
9 July 1978

Colombia	Awarded to Venezuela	Venezuela
	Report

Atanasio Girardot, Medellín, Colombia

Colombia won 4–0, but the result was later awarded to Venezuela

11 July 1978

Dominican Republic	0–0	Puerto Rico
	Report

Atanasio Girardot, Medellín, Colombia
11 July 1978

Colombia	Awarded to Mexico	Mexico
	Report

Atanasio Girardot, Medellín, Colombia

Colombia drew 1–1 with Mexico, but the result was later awarded to Mexico.

13 July 1978

Mexico	9–0	Puerto Rico
Rico 24', 36', 62'; Farfán 40', 44'; Haro 45'; Bracamontes 69', 72'; Romero 82'	Report

Atanasio Girardot, Medellín, Colombia
13 July 1978

Venezuela	5–1	Dominican Republic
A. Peña 10'; Carvajal 22', 34', 79'; Á. Castillo 36'	Report	A. Perez 89'

Atanasio Girardot, Medellín, Colombia
15 July 1978

Mexico	0–0	Venezuela
	Report

Atanasio Girardot, Medellín, Colombia
15 July 1978

Colombia	Awarded to Puerto Rico	Puerto Rico
	Report

Atanasio Girardot, Medellín, Colombia

Note: Colombia won 5–1, but the result was awarded to Puerto Rico on the following day, 16 July, when Colombia was disqualified due to 14 of their players being professionals.

17 July 1978

Puerto Rico	0–2	Venezuela
	Report	Cárdenas 8'; A. Peña 14'

Atanasio Girardot, Medellín, Colombia
17 July 1978

Colombia	Awarded to Dominican	Dominican Republic
	Report

Atanasio Girardot, Medellín, Colombia

Note: This match was not played because Colombia was disqualified.

== Knockout stage ==
=== Semi-finals ===
19 July 1978
Semi-finals

Venezuela	0–0 (a.e.t.)	Bermuda
	Report
Penalties
	5–3

Atanasio Girardot, Medellín, Colombia
19 July 1978
Semi-finals

Cuba	3–1	Mexico
Pereira 21'; Núñez 43'; Roldán 50'	Report	Morales 5'

Atanasio Girardot, Medellín, Colombia

=== Third-place match ===
21 July 1978
Third Place Play-off

Bermuda	3–0	Mexico
R. Bean 51'; M. Bean 62'; Brangman 75'	Report

Atanasio Girardot, Medellín, Colombia

=== Final ===
21 July 1978
Final

Cuba	2–0 (a.e.t.)	Venezuela
Lara 113'; Pereira 115'	Report

Atanasio Girardot, Medellín, Colombia

1978 Central American and Caribbean Games

Cuba
4th title

Event	Gold	Silver	Bronze
Men's football	Cuba (CUB)	Venezuela (VEN)	Bermuda (BER)
	Roberto Pereira; Luis M. Sánchez; Andrés Roldán; Dagoberto Lara; Ramón Núñez; Luis Dreke; Miguel Rivero; Regino Delgado; Jorge Massó; Carlos Loredo; Hugo Madera; José F. Reinoso; René Bonora; Emilio Arzuaga; Guillermo Mestre; Amado Povea; Miguel Fuentes Quiala; Rolando Morales; Carlos Montenegro; Calixto Martínez	Rodolfo Carvajal; César Semiday; José Contreras; Gustavo Roque; Gerardo Vielma; Juan Vidal; Alexis Peña; Asdrúbal Sánchez; Rafael Cadenas; Julio Hernández; José Fernández; Alexis Toro; Ángel Castillo; Pedro Febles; Luis Contreras; Omar Paredes; José Abad	Ralph Bean; Harold Madeiros; Wendell Simmons; Gerard Lambert; Seymour Danvers; Joseph Trott; Albert Dowling; George Brangman; Frederick Lewis; William Astwood; Robert Calderón; Dereck Scott; Melvin Bean; Sheldon Bradshan; Frank Brewster; Wayne Richardson; Arnold West; Joseph Wilking; Erskine Smith

== Statistics ==
=== Goalscorers ===
There were 88 goals scored in 25 matches, for an average of 3.52 goals per match.

7 goals

- (Bermuda) Ralph Bean
- (Cuba) Roberto Pereira

5 goals

- (Bermuda) George Brangman
- (Panama) Daniel Montilla
- (Trinidad and Tobago) Richard Chinapoo

4 goals

- (Cuba) Ramón Núñez

3 goals

- (Cuba) Jorge Masso
- (Panama) Agustín Sánchez
- (Panama) Néstor Hernández
- (Mexico) Cristóbal Rico
- (Trinidad and Tobago) Robert Joseph
- (Venezuela) Rodolfo Carvajal

2 goals

- (Netherlands Antilles) Mario Bislip
- (Cuba) Andrés Roldán
- (Mexico) Carlos Bracamontes
- (Mexico) Jorge Morales
- (Mexico) Salvador Farfán
- (Trinidad and Tobago) Morell Curtis
- (Trinidad and Tobago) Ron Laforest
- (Venezuela) Alexis Peña

1 goal

- (Netherlands Antilles) Monico Ruiz
- (Netherlands Antilles) Alejandro Arrue
- (Bermuda) Frederick Lewis
- (Bermuda) Melvin Bean
- (Bermuda) William Astwood
- (Cuba) Dagoberto Lara
- (Cuba) Miguel Rivero
- (Cuba) Regino Delgado
- (Cuba) Miguel Fuentes Quiala
- (Cuba) Luis Valdez
- (Dominican Republic) Antonio Perez
- (Dominican Republic) Ramón Martínez
- (Mexico) Jorge Haro
- (Mexico) Armando Romero
- (Panama) Fernando Flores
- (El Salvador) Carlos Villatoro
- (Trinidad and Tobago) Brian John
- (Trinidad and Tobago) Gerald Greene
- (Venezuela) Ángel Castillo
- (Venezuela) Rafael Cárdenas
