= Football at the 1982 Central American and Caribbean Games =

Fútbol en los Juegos Centroamericanos y del Caribe 1982

Tournament details
- Host country: Cuba
- Dates: 8–16 August 1982
- Teams: 8 (from 2 confederations)
- Venue(s): 1 (in 1 host city)

Final positions
- Champions: Venezuela (1st title)
- Runners-up: Mexico
- Third place: Cuba
- Fourth place: Bermuda
- All statistics correct as of 16 August 1982.

Football was contested for men only at the 1982 Central American and Caribbean Games in Havana, Cuba.

== Participants ==
- Bahamas
- Bermuda
- Cuba (Hosts)
- Mexico
- Netherlands Antilles
- Nicaragua
- Puerto Rico
- Venezuela

== Group stage ==
=== Group A ===
Pos	Team	Pld	W	D	L	GF	GA	GD	Pts	Qualification
1	Cuba	3	3	0	0	7	1	+6	6	Qualified to Semifinals
2	Bermuda	3	2	0	1	7	4	+3	4	Qualified to Semifinals
3	Puerto Rico	3	1	0	2	4	6	−2	2	
4	Bahamas	3	0	0	3	1	8	−7	0	

=== Group B ===
Pos	Team	Pld	W	D	L	GF	GA	GD	Pts	Qualification
1	Mexico	3	2	1	0	6	1	+5	5	Qualified to Semifinals
2	Venezuela	3	1	1	1	7	4	+3	3	Qualified to Semifinals
3	Netherlands Antilles	3	1	1	1	2	6	−4	3	
4	Nicaragua	3	0	1	2	2	6	−4	1	

== Semifinals ==
14 August 1982	Cuba	0–1	Venezuela	Havana, Cuba
CST			Cedeño

14 August 1982	Bermuda	1–2 a.e.t.	Mexico	Havana, Cuba
CST	Burt 35'		22' 119' Ruiz	Stadium: Estadio Pedro Marrero

== Bronze medal match ==
16 August 1982	Cuba	2–1	Bermuda	Havana, Cuba
CST	Pereira 60'; Delgado 89'		74' Bascome

== Gold medal match ==
16 August 1982	Mexico	0–1	Venezuela	Havana, Cuba
CST			53' Añor	Stadium: Estadio Pedro Marrero

Event	Gold	Silver	Bronze
Men's football	Venezuela (VEN)	Mexico (MEX)	Cuba (CUB)
	Daniel Nikolac; Oscar Arroyo; Arturo Olivares; Nelson Carrero; Ramón Parra; Ángel Castillo; Rodolfo Carvajal; Roberto Elie; Bernardo Añor; Iker Zubizarreta; Carlos Betancourt; Ricardo Penfold; Douglas Cedeño; José Gamboa; José Castrillo; Jorge Ferraguti; Próspero Dueñas; Juan Vidal	Eduardo Fernández; Héctor Román; Rafael Zúñiga; Carlos Rodríguez; Francisco Hernández; Ramón Onofre; Manuel Moreno; Joel Ruiz; Idolfonso Ríos; Pedro Rojas; Gerardo Ruiz; Hugo Valenzuela; Juan Martínez; Ramón Pérez; Rubén González; César Meza; Filiberto Méndez; Enrique Suárez; Armando Ramos; Raymundo Rodríguez	Máximo Iznaga; Francisco López; Francisco Carrazana; Luis M. Sánchez; Juan F. Caro; Andrés Roldán; Ramón Núñez; Antonio Echevarría; Héctor Pedroso; Jorge Maya; Regino Delgado; Jorge Massó; Julio Pérez; Carlos Loredo; Roberto Pereira; Eugenio Cabrera; Calixto Martínez; Dagoberto Lara; Carlos González; Julio Cabrera
