= 1981 CONCACAF Championship qualification =

Football results

Tournament details
- Dates: 30 March – 21 December 1980
- Teams: 15 (from 1 confederation)

Tournament statistics
- Matches played: 40
- Goals scored: 92 (2.3 per match)

The 1981 CONCACAF Championship qualification competition was the qualifying contest to decide the finalists for the 1981 CONCACAF Championship – the eighth international association football championship for members of the Confederation of North, Central America and Caribbean Association Football (CONCACAF). Qualifying ran from 30 March – 21 December 1980 and was contested by the national teams of 15 CONCACAF member associations. The competition doubled as the qualification competition for the 1982 FIFA World Cup.

As with the previous edition, no teams qualified automatically. The qualifying competition was split into three zones – a Caribbean zone, a Central American zone and a North American zone. Two teams from each zone – Cuba and Haiti from the Caribbean zone, Honduras and El Salvador from the Central American zone and Canada and Mexico from the North American zone – qualified for the final tournament.

== Background ==
The Confederation of North, Central America and Caribbean Association Football (CONCACAF) was founded as a merger of the Confederación Centroamericana y del Caribe de Fútbol (CCCF) and North American Football Confederation (NAFC) in 1961. The first CONCACAF Championship, in which all the competing nations qualified automatically, was held in 1963. A qualifying competition was introduced from the second edition in 1965. From 1973, the competition doubled as the qualifying competition for the FIFA World Cup for teams in North, Central America and the Caribbean. Only the winner of each edition would qualify for the World Cup.

== Format ==
Qualification for the 1981 CONCACAF Championship was split into a Caribbean zone, a Central American zone and a North American zone.

In both the North and Central American zones, the competing teams would contest a double round-robin where each team would play all of the others twice. The winners and runners-up from both sections would qualify for the final tournament.

A preliminary round was contested in the Caribbean zone in which two of the teams would contest a two-legged tie. The team scoring more goals on aggregate would advance. The zone was then split into two groups in which the competing teams would contest a double round-robin. Each team would play all of the others twice. The winners of both groups would qualify for the final tournament.

=== Participants ===
Caribbean zone:

- Cuba
- Dominican Republic
- Grenada
- Guyana
- Haiti
- Netherlands Antilles
- Suriname
- Trinidad and Tobago

Central American zone:

- Costa Rica
- El Salvador
- Guatemala
- Honduras
- Panama

North American zone:

- Canada
- Mexico
- United States

== North American zone ==
The North American zone began on 18 October when Canada drew 1–1 with Mexico. A week later, the United States and Canada played out a goalless draw. On 1 November, Canada defeated the United States 2–1 to qualify for the final tournament. With half the games played, Canada led the group with four points, three ahead of both Mexico and the United States.

On 9 November, Mexico defeated the United States 5–1. A week later, Mexico again drew 1–1 with Canada to qualify for the final tournament. In the final match, the United States defeated Mexico 2–1 on 23 November.

=== Table ===
| Pos | Team | Pld | W | D | L | GF | GA | GD | Pts | Qualification |
|---|---|---|---|---|---|---|---|---|---|---|
| 1 | Canada | 4 | 1 | 3 | 0 | 4 | 3 | +1 | 5 | Qualification for 1981 CONCACAF Championship |
| 2 | Mexico | 4 | 1 | 2 | 1 | 8 | 5 | +3 | 4 | Qualification for 1981 CONCACAF Championship |
| 3 | United States | 4 | 1 | 1 | 2 | 4 | 8 | −4 | 3 | |

=== Results ===
18 October 1980

| Canada | 1–1 | Mexico |
|---|---|---|
| Stojanović 43' | | Luna 89' |

Exhibition Stadium, Toronto
Attendance: 6,371
Referee: Siles Calderón (Costa Rica)

25 October 1980

| United States | 0–0 | Canada |

Lockhart Stadium, Fort Lauderdale
Attendance: 7,864
Referee: Herrera García (El Salvador)

1 November 1980

| Canada | 2–1 | United States |
|---|---|---|
| Iarusci 21'; Šegota 42' (pen.) | | Villa 90' |

Empire Stadium, Vancouver
Attendance: 13,598
Referee: Méndez Molina (Guatemala)

9 November 1980

| Mexico | 5–1 | United States |
|---|---|---|
| Sánchez 24'; Camacho 31', 55'; Mendizabal 37'; González 40' | | Davis 76' (pen.) |

Estadio Azteca, Mexico City
Attendance: 90,000
Referee: Valverde Salazar (Costa Rica)

16 November 1980

| Mexico | 1–1 | Canada |
|---|---|---|
| Sánchez 75' (pen.) | | Gray 87' |

Estadio Azteca, Mexico City
Attendance: 108,000
Referee: Midence Torres (Honduras)

23 November 1980

| United States | 2–1 | Mexico |
|---|---|---|
| Moyers 31', 65' | | Sánchez 40' |

Lockhart Stadium, Fort Lauderdale
Attendance: 2,126
Referee: Gracias Regalado (Guatemala)

== Central American zone ==
The Central American zone began on 2 July when Guatemala defeated Panama 2–0. On 30 July, Honduras defeated Panama by the same score line. On 10 August, Panama drew 1–1 with Costa Rica. A fortnight later, El Salvador defeated Panama 3–1. On 1 October, Honduras defeated Costa Rica 3–2. Four days later, El Salvador defeated Panama 4–1. On 12 October, Guatemala and Costa Rica played out a goalless draw. Two weeks later, Honduras and Guatemala also drew goalless.

On the same day, Costa Rica were due to play away against El Salvador but they did not show up for the match. The Federación Costarricense de Fútbol cited security concerns around the Salvadoran Civil War but were heavily criticised for the decision. The match was subsequently awarded as a 2–0 win to El Salvador.

On 5 November, Costa Rica defeated Panama 2–0. With half the matches played, El Salvador were top of the table with six points from a possible six, one point ahead of Honduras and two clear of Guatemala and Costa Rica.

Guatemala and El Salvador drew goalless on 9 November. A week later, Guatemala won 5–0 against Panama and Honduras drew 1–1 with Costa Rica. On 23 November, El Salvador ended Honduras' unbeaten start to the competition by defeating them 2–1. Three days later, Guatemala defeated Costa Rica 3–0. With five matches left overall, Guatemala – who were yet to concede a goal – and El Salvador were tied on nine points, three points ahead of Honduras.

On 30 November, Honduras ended El Salvador's unbeaten start to the competition by defeating them 2–0. A week later, Honduras went top of the group with a 1–0 win against Guatemala. On 10 December, Costa Rica and El Salvador played out a goalless draw. Four days later, Honduras qualified for the final tournament by defeating Panama 5–0. In the final match a week later, El Salvador defeated Guatemala 1–0 in a winner-takes-all fixture to qualify for the final tournament.

=== Table ===
| Pos | Team | Pld | W | D | L | GF | GA | GD | Pts | Qualification |
|---|---|---|---|---|---|---|---|---|---|---|
| 1 | Honduras | 8 | 5 | 2 | 1 | 15 | 5 | +10 | 12 | Qualification for 1981 CONCACAF Championship |
| 2 | El Salvador | 8 | 5 | 2 | 1 | 12 | 5 | +7 | 12 | Qualification for 1981 CONCACAF Championship |
| 3 | Guatemala | 8 | 3 | 3 | 2 | 10 | 2 | +8 | 9 | |
| 4 | Costa Rica | 8 | 1 | 4 | 3 | 6 | 10 | −4 | 6 | |
| 5 | Panama | 8 | 0 | 1 | 7 | 3 | 24 | −21 | 1 | |

=== Results ===
2 July 1980

| Panama | 0–2 | Guatemala |
|---|---|---|
| | | Gómez 27'; Mitrovich 49' |

Estadio de la Revolución, Panama City
Attendance: 11,000
Referee: Robert Evans (United States)

30 July 1980

| Panama | 0–2 | Honduras |
|---|---|---|
| | | Bernárdez 14'; Costly 85' |

Estadio de la Revolución, Panama City
Attendance: 8,975
Referee: Hubert Tromp (Netherlands Antilles)

10 August 1980

| Panama | 1–1 | Costa Rica |
|---|---|---|
| Montillo 37' | | Arroyo 73' |

Estadio de la Revolución, Panama City
Attendance: 5,678
Referee: Goede (Suriname)

24 August 1980

| Panama | 1–3 | El Salvador |
|---|---|---|
| Paschal 19' | | Rivas 16'; Huezo 75'; González 82' |

Estadio de la Revolución, Panama City
Attendance: 3,547
Referee: Frederick Hoyte (Barbados)

1 October 1980

| Costa Rica | 2–3 | Honduras |
|---|---|---|
| Javier Jiménez 78' (pen.); Mills 81' | | Bulnes 29'; Bernárdez 42'; Bailey 67' |

Estadio Ricardo Saprissa Aymá, San José
Attendance: 18,263
Referee: Soupliotis (Canada)

5 October 1980

| El Salvador | 4–1 | Panama |
|---|---|---|
| González 2', 61', 77'; Rivas 35' | | Montillo 27' |

Estadio Cuscatlán, San Salvador
Attendance: 33,005
Referee: Winsemann (Canada)

12 October 1980

| Guatemala | 0–0 | Costa Rica |

Estadio Mateo Flores, Guatemala City
Attendance: 40,000
Referee: Narvaez Escobar (Mexico)

26 October 1980

| Honduras | 0–0 | Guatemala |

Estadio Nacional Chelato Uclés, Tegucigalpa
Attendance: 44,220
Referee: Dorantes García (Mexico)

26 October 1980

| El Salvador | 2–0 (awarded) (Note: Costa Rica refused to travel to El Salvador for security reasons. FIFA awarded 2–0 win to El Salvador.) | Costa Rica |

Estadio Cuscatlán, San Salvador
Referee: Domingo de la Mora (Mexico)

5 November 1980

| Costa Rica | 2–0 | Panama |
|---|---|---|
| Morera 14'; W. Jiménez 48' (pen.) |

Estadio Nacional de Costa Rica, San José
Attendance: 7,873
Referee: Dante Maglio (Canada)

9 November 1980

| Guatemala | 0–0 | El Salvador |

Estadio Mateo Flores, Guatemala City
Attendance: 42,453
Referee: David Socha (United States)

16 November 1980

| Guatemala | 5–0 | Panama |
|---|---|---|
| Sánchez 11'; Gómez 26', 69'; Mitrovich 55'; Wellmann 85' |

Estadio Mateo Flores, Guatemala City
Attendance: 32,216
Referee: Johnson (Canada)

16 November 1980

| Honduras | 1–1 | Costa Rica |
|---|---|---|
| Velásquez 77' | | Morera 33' |

Estadio Nacional Chelato Uclés, Tegucigalpa
Attendance: 28,159
Referee: David Socha (United States)

23 November 1980

| El Salvador | 2–1 | Honduras |
|---|---|---|
| González 9'; Guerrero 66' | | Figueroa 85' |

Estadio Cuscatlán, San Salvador
Attendance: 40,851
Referee: Fusco (Canada)

26 November 1980

| Costa Rica | 0–3 | Guatemala |
|---|---|---|
| | | Pennant 27'; Sánchez 64' (pen.); Gómez 88' |

Estadio Ricardo Saprissa Aymá, San José
Attendance: 17,042
Referee: Matos (Canada)

30 November 1980

| Honduras | 2–0 | El Salvador |
|---|---|---|
| Bailey 23', 66' |

Estadio Nacional Chelato Uclés, Tegucigalpa
Attendance: 38,979
Referee: Tony Evangelista (Canada)

7 December 1980

| Guatemala | 0–1 | Honduras |
|---|---|---|
| | | Bailey 71' |

Estadio Mateo Flores, Guatemala City
Attendance: 42,381
Referee: Kibritjian (United States)

10 December 1980

| Costa Rica | 0–0 | El Salvador |

Estadio Ricardo Saprissa Aymá, San José
Attendance: 3,284
Referee: Rubio Vasquez (Mexico)

14 December 1980

| Honduras | 5–0 | Panama |
|---|---|---|
| Bernárdez 6', 21', 69'; Figueroa 32', 77' |

Estadio Nacional Chelato Uclés, Tegucigalpa, Honduras
Attendance: 25,000
Referee: Mendoza Guillen (Mexico)

21 December 1980

| El Salvador | 1–0 | Guatemala |
|---|---|---|
| Huezo 49' |

Estadio Cuscatlán, San Salvador
Attendance: 22,813
Referee: D'Ippolito (United States)

== Caribbean zone ==
=== Preliminary round ===
In the preliminary round first leg on 30 March, Guyana defeated Grenada 5–2. In the second leg a fortnight later, Guyana won 3–2 against Grenada to advance 8–4 on aggregate.

Preliminary round
| Team 1 | Agg. | Team 2 | 1st leg | 2nd leg |
|---|---|---|---|---|
| Guyana | 8–4 | Grenada | 5–2 | 3–2 |

30 March 1980

| Guyana | 5–2 | Grenada |
|---|---|---|
| Braithwaite 33' (pen.); Watson 50', 87'; Canterbury 56'; Forde 57' | | Julien 15'; Belfon 17' |

Bourda, Georgetown
Attendance: 5,000
Referee: José Leonidas Rogel (El Salvador)
13 April 1980

| Grenada | 2–3 | Guyana |
|---|---|---|
| Cherubin 56'; Mitchell 87' (pen.) | | Watson 13', 38'; Canterbury 16' |

National Cricket Stadium, Saint George's
Attendance: 1,298
Referee: Juan Ramón Mollinero (Guatemala)

Guyana won 8–4 on aggregate.

=== Group A ===
Group A began on 17 August when Cuba defeated Suriname 3–0. On 7 September, Suriname and Cuba played out a goalless draw. On 28 September, Suriname defeated Guyana 1–0. With half the matches played, Cuba and Suriname were tied on three points at the top of the table.

On 12 October, Suriname defeated Guyana 4–0 in what was their final game to go clear at the top of the table. On 9 November, Cuba defeated Guyana 1–0 to pull level on points with Suriname. Three weeks later, Cuba won 3–0 against Guyana to qualify for the final tournament.

==== Table ====
| Pos | Team | Pld | W | D | L | GF | GA | GD | Pts | Qualification |
|---|---|---|---|---|---|---|---|---|---|---|
| 1 | Cuba | 4 | 3 | 1 | 0 | 7 | 0 | +7 | 7 | Qualification for 1981 CONCACAF Championship |
| 2 | Suriname | 4 | 2 | 1 | 1 | 5 | 3 | +2 | 5 | |
| 3 | Guyana | 4 | 0 | 0 | 4 | 0 | 9 | −9 | 0 | |

==== Results ====
17 August 1980

| Cuba | 3–0 | Suriname |
|---|---|---|
| Delgado 69'; Pereira 71', 78' |

Estadio Pedro Marrero, Havana
Attendance: 6,000
Referee: Antonio Márquez (Mexico)

7 September 1980

| Suriname | 0–0 | Cuba |

André Kamperveen Stadion, Paramaribo
Attendance: 4,000
Referee: Hubert Tromp (Netherlands Antilles)

28 September 1980

| Guyana | 0–1 | Suriname |
|---|---|---|
| | | Stjeward 22' |

Bourda, Georgetown
Attendance: 6,000
Referee: Reginald Wooding (Trinidad and Tobago)

12 October 1980

| Suriname | 4–0 | Guyana |
|---|---|---|
| Leisbergen 20', 40'; George 22'; Calor 80' |

André Kamperveen Stadion, Paramaribo
Attendance: 10,000
Referee: L. De Boer (Netherlands Antilles)

9 November 1980

| Cuba | 1–0 | Guyana |
|---|---|---|
| Hernández 14' |

Estadio Pedro Marrero, Havana
Attendance: 8,000
Referee: Whilston Taylor (Jamaica)

30 November 1980

| Guyana | 0–3 | Cuba |
|---|---|---|
| | | Hernández 8'; Espinosa 17'; Roldán 18' |

McKenzie Sports Club Ground, Linden
Attendance: 7,664
Referee: R. Goede (Suriname)

=== Group B ===
Group B began on 1 August when Haiti defeated Trinidad and Tobago 2–0. On 17 August, Trinidad and Tobago won 1–0 against Haiti. On 12 September, Haiti won 1–0 against the Netherlands Antilles. With half the matches played, Haiti were top of the group with four points, two ahead of Trinidad and Tobago.

On 9 November, Trinidad and Tobago drew goalless with the Netherlands Antilles. They again played out a goalless draw on 29 November which eliminated Trinidad and Tobago in their last match of the competition. In the final match on 12 December, Haiti drew 1–1 with the Netherlands Antilles to qualify for the final tournament.

==== Table ====
| Pos | Team | Pld | W | D | L | GF | GA | GD | Pts | Qualification |
|---|---|---|---|---|---|---|---|---|---|---|
| 1 | Haiti | 4 | 2 | 1 | 1 | 4 | 2 | +2 | 5 | Qualification for 1981 CONCACAF Championship |
| 2 | Trinidad and Tobago | 4 | 1 | 2 | 1 | 1 | 2 | −1 | 4 | |
| 3 | Netherlands Antilles | 4 | 0 | 3 | 1 | 1 | 2 | −1 | 3 | |

==== Results ====
1 August 1980

| Haiti | 2–0 | Trinidad and Tobago |
|---|---|---|
| Crispin 84'; Bobo 89' |

Stade Sylvio Cator, Port-au-Prince
Attendance: 15,000
Referee: Marcel Pérez (Mexico)

17 August 1980

| Trinidad and Tobago | 1–0 | Haiti |
|---|---|---|
| Spann 55' (pen.) |

Skinner Park, San Fernando
Attendance: 5,535
Referee: Carlos Monge (Costa Rica)

12 September 1980

| Haiti | 1–0 | Netherlands Antilles |
|---|---|---|
| Brevil 74' |

Stade Sylvio Cator, Port-au-Prince
Attendance: 8,606
Referee: Whilston Taylor (Jamaica)

9 November 1980

| Trinidad and Tobago | 0–0 | Netherlands Antilles |

Queen's Park Oval, Port of Spain
Attendance: 5,000
Referee: Frederick Hoyte (Barbados)

29 November 1980

| Netherlands Antilles | 0–0 | Trinidad and Tobago |

Ergilio Hato Stadium, Willemstad
Attendance: 7,991
Referee: Glenn Kranenburg (Suriname)

12 December 1980

| Netherlands Antilles | 1–1 | Haiti |
|---|---|---|
| Kwidama 73' | | Crispin 3' |

Ergilio Hato Stadium, Willemstad
Attendance: 6,467
Referee: Domingo De la Mora (Mexico)

== Goalscorers ==
There were 92 goals scored in 40 matches, for an average of 2.3 goals per match.

5 goals

- (El Salvador) Jorge González
- (Honduras) Salvador Bernárdez

4 goals

- (Guatemala) Julio Roberto Gómez Rendón
- (Guyana) Clyde Watson
- (Honduras) Roberto Bailey
- (Mexico) Hugo Sánchez

3 goals

- (Honduras) José Roberto Figueroa

2 goals

- (Costa Rica) Omar Morera Barrantes
- (Cuba) Luis Hernández
- (Cuba) Roberto Pereira
- (El Salvador) Norberto Huezo
- (El Salvador) José María Rivas
- (Guatemala) José Emilio Mitrovich
- (Guatemala) Óscar Enrique Sánchez
- (Guyana) Ashton Canterbury Taylor
- (Haiti) Serge Crispin
- (Mexico) Adrián Camacho
- (Panama) Daniel Montillo Ruíz
- (Suriname) Johan Leisbergen
- (United States) Steve Moyers

1 goal

- (Canada) Gerry Gray
- (Canada) Robert Iarusci
- (Canada) Branko Šegota
- (Canada) Mike Stojanović
- (Costa Rica) Omar Arroyo
- (Costa Rica) Javier Jiménez
- (Costa Rica) William Jiménez Mora
- (Costa Rica) Rodolfo Mills
- (Cuba) Regino Delgado
- (Cuba) Roberto Espinosa
- (Cuba) Andrés Roldán
- (El Salvador) Óscar Gustavo Guerrero
- (Grenada) Carlton Belfon
- (Grenada) Douglas Cherubin
- (Grenada) Jude Julien
- (Grenada) Jude Mitchell
- (Guatemala) Allan Wellmann
- (Guatemala) Selvin Pennant
- (Guyana) Gordon Braithwaite
- (Guyana) Clyde Ford
- (Haiti) Fritz Bobo
- (Haiti) Carlo Brevin
- (Honduras) Fernando Bulnes
- (Honduras) Allan Anthony Costly
- (Honduras) Moisés Tomás Velásquez Torres
- (Mexico) José Luis González China
- (Mexico) Guillermo Mendizabal
- (Netherlands Antilles) Glenn Kwidama
- (Panama) Ricardo Paschal Chambers
- (Suriname) Ricardo Calor
- (Suriname) Roy George
- (Suriname) Kenneth Stjeward
- (Trinidad and Tobago) Leroy Spann
- (United States) Rick Davis
- (United States) Greg Villa
