= Gustavo Vargas (footballer) =

Mexican footballer (born 1955)

Personal information
- Full name: Gustavo Vargas López
- Date of birth: 24 January 1955 (age 71)
- Place of birth: La Piedad, Michoacán, Mexico
- Height: 1.75 m (5 ft 9 in)
- Position: Defender

Senior career*
Years	Team	Apps	(Gls)
1978–1983	Pumas UNAM		
1983–1985	Cruz Azul		
1986–1988	Atlante		
1988–1989	Tigres UANL		

International career
1980–1981	Mexico	8	(0)

Managerial career
- 1990s: Irapuato
- 1999: Mexico
- 2002: Puebla
- 2017: Celaya
Medal record
Men's football
Representing Mexico
CONCACAF Championship
Bronze medal – third place	1981 Honduras	Team
- * Club domestic league appearances and goals

Gustavo Vargas López (born 24 January 1955) is retired Mexican football player and manager. He played as a defender for Pumas UNAM, Cruz Azul and Atlante throughout the 1980s. He also represented Mexico for the 1981 CONCACAF Championship.

== Club career ==
Vargas began his career within Pumas UNAM with his first major appearances occurring in their 1978–79 season. His first taste of success with the club came two seasons later as he was part of the winning squad for the 1981 CONCACAF Champions' Cup. He would contribute more to the club's eventual victory during the 1981 Copa Interamericana as he scored two goals in the second leg as well as in the final where Vargas himself scored the winning goal, turning him into a club icon. His final title with the club came during the 1980–81 season as Pumas would win their 2nd title, beating out Cruz Azul in the final of the 1980–81 Mexican Primera División. Following an additional two seasons, he transferred to Cruz Azul for an additional two seasons. Throughout the remainder of the decade, he played for Atlante and Tigres UANL before retiring in 1989.

== International career ==
Vargas was first called up in the final matchday of the 1981 CONCACAF Championship qualifiers to a surprise defeat to the United States on 23 November 1980. During the 1981 CONCACAF Championship proper, he played in the 0–1 loss to Honduras and the 1–1 draws to Haiti and Canada, ultimately costing Mexico qualification for the 1982 FIFA World Cup.

== Managerial career ==
Vargas later took up a career in football management, first managing Irapuato across the 1990s. His biggest managerial role came in 1999 when he was made interim manager of Mexico for the 1999 Lunar New Year Cup held in Hong Kong, contributing to the Tricolor winning the tournament. His next managerial role saw him as manager for Puebla throughout the first eight games of the Primera División de México Apertura 2002 before getting sacked after a poor record of just a single victory followed by three draws and four defeats. He has since worked for San Luis in 2012 as an assistant manager to José Luis Trejo. He later briefly served as manager of Celaya throughout the Clausura of the 2016–17 Ascenso MX season where the club later had a mediocre season.
