= Jaime Pajarito =

Mexican footballer (born 1955)

Personal information
- Full name: Jaime Cleofas Pajarito García
- Date of birth: 12 April 1955 (age 71)
- Place of birth: Tonalá, Jalisco, Mexico
- Position: Forward

Senior career*
Years	Team	Apps	(Gls)
1976–1980	Atlas	107	(30)
1980–1984	Guadalajara	121	(51)
1984–1985	Tigres UANL	20	(6)
1986–1987	Guadalajara		(5)

International career
1981	Mexico	4	(0)
Medal record
Men's football
Representing Mexico
CONCACAF Championship
Bronze medal – third place	1981 Honduras	Team
- * Club domestic league appearances and goals

Jaime Cleofas Pajarito García (born 12 April 1955) is a retired Mexican footballer. He played as a forward, Atlas, Guadalajara and Tigres UANL throughout the late 1970s and the 1980s. He also represented Mexico internationally for the 1981 CONCACAF Championship.

== Club career ==
Pajarito began his professional career with Atlas for their 1976–77 season following catching the attention of a talent scout in his home city. Following three seasons, he made the switch to club rivals Guadalajara for their 1980–81 season. His debut season was notable as Pajarito scored a hat-trick against Pumas UNAM with three successive headers as he went on to score 27 goals throughout his entire season. Throughout the remainder of his tenure with Chivas, he became one of the most successful goalscorers in the club's history with this record later being equalized by Armando González. Following a single season in Tigres UANL, Pajarito would retire but come back for an additional season as during the third matchday of the 1986–87 season, a brawl broke out between the players of Chivas and Superclásico rivals América which left 10 Chivas players suspended. This led to club manager Alberto Guerra choosing to pick Pajarito to play whilst he attempted to recover the 10 suspended players. Pajarito ultimately helped Chivas win their 6th title 1986–87 Mexican Primera División with an additional 5 goals to his record before his indefinite retirement.

== International career ==
Pajarito was first called up in a 1–3 loss against Spain on 23 June 1981, coming in as a substitute for Ricardo Castro Valenzuela. He served a similar role throughout the 1981 CONCACAF Championship where he served as substitute in the matches against El Salvador and Haiti for Pedro Munguía and Ricardo Castro respectively. His final appearance came in a 1–1 draw against Canada, causing Mexico to miss out on the 1982 FIFA World Cup.

== Later life ==
Pajarito currently works as a coach within the youth sector of Chivas and has developed a reputation for instilling discipline amongst his players.
