= 1980–81 Pumas UNAM season =

Pumas UNAM
1980–81 season
- Head coach: Bora Milutinović
- Stadium: Estadio Olímpico Universitario
- Mexican Primera División: Winners
- CONCACAF Champions' Cup: Winners
- Copa Interamericana: Winners

The 1980–81 season was the 20th season of Pumas UNAM in the top flight of Mexican football. In addition to the domestic league, the club participated in this season's editions of the CONCACAF Champions' Cup, and the Copa Interamericana.

== Competitions ==
=== Overview ===
Competition	First match	Last match	Starting round	Final position	Record							
Competition	First match	Last match	Starting round	Final position	Pld	W	D	L	GF	GA	GD	Win %
Mexican Primera División	19 September 1980	9 August 1981	Matchday 1	Winners	47	25	12	10	95	64	+31	53.19
CONCACAF Champions' Cup	6 November 1980	12 February 1981	Third round	Winners	4	4	0	0	9	1	+8	100.00
Copa Interamericana	25 March 1981	13 May 1981	Final	Winners	3	2	0	1	6	5	+1	66.67
Total					54	31	12	11	110	70	+40	57.41

Source: RSSSF RSSSF

=== CONCACAF Champions' Cup ===
Pumas UNAM entered the tournament in the third round, after their opponent withdrew from the competition in the first round.

==== Third round ====
6 November 1980 First leg	Pumas UNAM (Mexico)	1–0	(Mexico) Cruz Azul	Mexico City, Mexico
		Report

13 November 1980 Second leg	Cruz Azul (Mexico)	1–3 (1–4 agg.)	(Mexico) Pumas UNAM	Mexico City, Mexico
		Report

==== Final round ====
8 February 1981 1	Pumas UNAM (Mexico)	3–0	(Suriname) Robinhood	Tegucigalpa, Honduras
		Report

12 February 1981 2	UNAH (Honduras)	0–2	(Mexico) Pumas UNAM	Tegucigalpa, Honduras
		Report

=== Copa Interamericana ===
==== Final ====
First leg	Pumas UNAM (Mexico)	3–1	(Uruguay) Nacional	Mexico City, Mexico
		Report		Stadium: Estadio Olímpico Universitario; Attendance: 30,000; Referee: Rómulo Méndez (Guatemala)

Second leg	Nacional (Uruguay)	3–1	(Mexico) Pumas UNAM	Montevideo, Uruguay
		Report		Stadium: Estadio Centenario; Attendance: 40,000; Referee: José Roberto Wright (Brazil)

Play-off	Pumas UNAM (Mexico)	2–1 (6–5 agg.)	(Uruguay) Nacional	Los Angeles, United States
		Report		Stadium: Memorial Coliseum; Attendance: 15,000; Referee: José Roberto Wright (Brazil)
