= Pedro Munguía =

Mexican footballer (born 1958)

Personal information
- Full name: Pedro Munguía Munguía
- Date of birth: 29 June 1958 (age 68)
- Place of birth: Tecalitlán, Jalisco, Mexico
- Position: Defensive midfielder

Senior career*
Years	Team	Apps	(Gls)
1977–1993	Toluca	351	(0)

International career
1980–1981	Mexico	17	(0)
Medal record
Men's football
Representing Mexico
CONCACAF Championship
Bronze medal – third place	1981 Honduras	Team
- * Club domestic league appearances and goals

Pedro Munguía Munguía (born 29 June 1958) is a retired Mexican footballer. Nicknamed "Negro", he played as an defensive midfielder for Toluca throughout his entire career across the late 1970s through the early 1990s. He also represented Mexico for the 1981 CONCACAF Championship.

== Club career ==
Munguía made his senior debut for Toluca for their 1977–78 season that was moderately successful, reaching the playoffs where they were eliminated in the first round by Cruz Azul. Despite the majority of the 1980s seeing similarly average results, Munguía was notable as he chose to remain loyal to the club as he had developed into an integral member of the club's starting XI through his impassable defenses and his great stamina. His biggest achievement came during their 1988–89 season as he was part of the winning squad that won the 1988–89 Copa México. By the time of his retirement following the 1992–93 season, he had made 351 appearances for the Diablos Rojos.

== International career ==
Munguía made his international debut in a friendly on 20 March 1980 against South Korea where the Tricolor lost 1–0. A majority of his international career was spent in various friendlies across 1980 and 1981 until he was called up for the 1981 CONCACAF Championship qualifiers against Canada and the United States. During the 1981 CONCACAF Championship proper, Munguía played in the 4–0 beating against Cuba, the 0–1 loss against El Salvador and the 1–1 draw against Canada, causing Mexico to miss out on the 1982 FIFA World Cup.

== Later life ==
Munguía remained active within the activities of his former club, attending the 95th anniversary of the club alongside many of his former teammates in 2012. He was also seen alongside fellow footballer Jesús Godínez Gutiérrez in a commemorative match held in his home city of Tecalitlán.
