= Hernán García Martínez =

Honduran footballer (1952–2020)

Personal information
- Full name: Hernán Santiago García Martínez
- Date of birth: June 28, 1952
- Place of birth: Puerto Cortés, Cortés, Honduras
- Date of death: March 5, 2020 (aged 67)
- Place of death: San Pedro Sula, Cortés, Honduras
- Position: Defender

Senior career*
Years	Team	Apps	(Gls)
1972–1976	Broncos del Sur		
1977–1983	Marathón		
1984–1986	Real España		
1987	Sula		
1988	Cobán Imperial		
1989	Real Juventud		

International career
1981	Honduras	1	(0)

Managerial career
- 1994: Marathón
- 1999: Real España
- 2000–2001: Deportes Savio
- 2001: Honduras U20
- 2002: Victoria
- 2010–2012: Deportes Savio
- 2013: Platense
- 2014: Vida
- 2014–2015: Parrillas One
- 2019: Honduras Progreso
- 2019: Boca Juniors de Tocoa
Medal record
Men's football
Representing Honduras
CONCACAF Championship
Gold medal – first place	1981 Honduras	Team
- * Club domestic league appearances and goals

Hernán Santiago García Martínez (28 June 1952 – 6 February 2020) was a Honduran football player and manager. Nicknamed "Conquistador", "Bigotón" and "El Temerario", he played as a defender for Broncos del Sur, Marathón and Real España throughout the 1970s and the 1980s. He also represented Honduras for the 1981 CONCACAF Championship.

== Career as a player ==
García began his career with Broncos del Sur for his first five seasons. He later played for Marathón and Real España throughout the late 1970s and early 1980s. He notably played for Cobán Imperial in Guatemala in 1988 before concluding his career with Real Juventud in 1989 within the Segunda División.

== International career ==
García wad first called up for a single appearance at the 1981 CONCACAF Championship in a 2–0 victory over Cuba on 8 November 1981. Despite Honduras ultimately winning the tournament and qualifying for the 1982 FIFA World Cup, he wasn't chosen for the final tournament.

== Career as a manager ==
García's first club was with his former club of Marathón in 1994, leading the club to win the 1994 Honduran Cup, defeating title holders Real Maya though his tenure would be brief despite his success. He later managed Real España during the second half of the 1998–99 Honduran Liga Nacional where under his leadership, Real España reached the finals of the tournament, narrowly losing to Olimpia in the final. This was then followed up by Deportes Savio who were recently promoted to the top-flight of Honduran football throughout the entirety of the 2000–01 Honduran Liga Nacional as well as 12 matches of the subsequent 2001–02 Honduran Liga Nacional as following poor results, was sacked in favor for Sergio Flores. Thus, the Clausura of the season was spent with Victoria though his tenure would be abruptly halted as García developed bladder cancer and spent the next years recovering from it.

Upon the sudden departure of Uruguayan manager Carlos Jurado, Deportes Savio were once more short on a manager and García returned to the club in 2010, saving it from near relegation. He went on to continue directing the club for the next two seasons as well as the Apertura of the 2012-13 Honduran Liga Nacional. His best result throughout his second tenure was in the 2011-12 Honduran Liga Nacional as Savio made the postseason for the first time in club history. By the time of his departure, García left the club at 9th place as Emilio Umanzor succeeded him in January 2013. This was because Platense had wanted his services for the Clausura 2013 with a respectable 4th place as well as qualifying for the postseason though poor results would result in him being removed.

Following the resignation of Jorge Ernesto Pineda on 31 January 2014, García assumed responsibilities of Vida throughout the Clausura 2014 before being replaced by Ramón Maradiaga on 16 May 2014. However, he continued 2014 with Parrillas One until the Clausura 2015. Around this time, his bladder cancer problems had returned and following being treated in the United States, announced his full recovery by July 2016.

== Personal life ==
García got married with Jenny Lara and later had four children with her: Eder, Eileen, Dennis and Hernán.

He died on 5 March 2020 at the age of 67 as he had been reported by the Honduran Social Security Institute as being diagnosed with urinary tract infection with his funeral being held the following day at the Cementerio de Lima.
