= Sergio Lira (footballer) =

Mexican footballer (born 1957)

Personal information
- Full name: Sergio Lira Gallardo
- Date of birth: 24 August 1957 (age 69)
- Place of birth: Tamiahua, Veracruz, Mexico
- Position: Forward

Senior career*
Years	Team	Apps	(Gls)
1978–1981	Tampico Madero	110	(25)
1981–1982	Atlante	18	(2)
1982–1984	Oaxtepec	64	(20)
1984–1990	Tampico Madero	209	(99)
1990–1992	Tigres UANL	67	(18)
1992–1996	Puebla	88	(16)
1996–1997	Tampico Madero		

International career
1979–1990	Mexico	11	(4)
Medal record
Men's football
Representing Mexico
CONCACAF Championship
Bronze medal – third place	1977 Mexico	Team
North American Nations Cup
Silver medal – second place	1990 Canada	Team
- * Club domestic league appearances and goals

Sergio Lira Gallardo (born 24 August 1957) is a retired Mexican footballer. Nicknamed "El Tamiahuero", he played for Tampico Madero, Oaxtepec, Tigres UANL and Puebla across the 1980s and the 1990s. He also represented Mexico internationally for the 1981 CONCACAF Championship and the 1990 North American Nations Cup.

== Club career ==
Lira began playing for Tampico Madero for their 1978–79 season where they had a mediocre performance in not reaching the playoffs by ten points with Lira only scoring 4 goals. Despite the rough start, he began scoring far more goals in the following 1979–80 season which led to Tampico reaching the playoffs. His success even amongst rough odds saw Lira be scouted by Atlante to play for them in their 1981–82 season. Despite this new signing, Lira constantly found himself as a substitute for Cabinho. Frustrated with his lack of full appearances, Lira signed with Oaxtepec which had been recently promoted to the top-flight of Mexican football. Following two seasons with the Halcones, Lira returned to Tampico. His second tenure with Madero saw even more success as Lira was the top goalscorer for the club in the 1985 and 1986 seasons with Tampico also narrowly losing to Monterrey in the final of the latter. Following a few more seasons with Lira being the top goalscorer for the 1988–89 season, began playing for Tigres UANL and despite not being the top goalscorer anymore, still enjoyed two moderately successful seasons with the club.

He then played for Puebla throughout the mid-1990s with their 1994–95 season being the most successful as they reached the playoffs. He was also briefly loaned to Tampico for their 1993–94 within the 1993–94 Mexican Segunda División and helped them achieve their promotion to the top-flight of Mexican football. Despite announcing his retirement following the 1995–96 season, he chose to return to Tampico for one final season in the 1996–97 Primera División A where they nearly achieved promotion but ultimately lost to Tigres UANL in the semi-finals in the Invierno 1996 and losing to Zacatepec in the playoffs for Verano 1997, retiring after that.

== International career ==
Lira was first called up in a friendly against the Soviet Union on 8 February 1979. Later, he was called up to play in a series of friendlies in Oceania against New Zealand and Australia on 20 and 25 August 1980. Interestingly, during the flight to Sydney, due to differences in time zones, skipped his birthday on the 24th as the plane landed on the 25th. He later scored his first goal in a friendly against South Korea on 10 February 1981 that ended in a 4–0 beating. Despite being named in the 1981 CONCACAF Championship roster, he ultimately made no appearances in neither the qualification matches nor the tournament proper. He made his final appearance during the 1990 North American Nations Cup in the 1–0 victory over United States on 10 May 1990.

== Later life ==
Lira has since been known as one of the most prestigious citizens of his home city of Tamiahua, being acknowledged by mayor Martín Cristóbal Cruz in 2016.
