= Clyde Watson =

Guyanese footballer (born 1956)

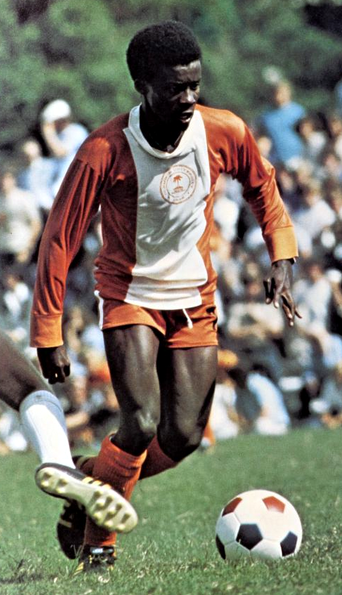
- Watson playing for Clemson in 1975

Personal information
- Date of birth: February 10, 1956 (age 70)
- Place of birth: Georgetown, British Guiana
- Height: 1.67 m (5 ft 6 in)
- Positions: Forward; midfielder

Youth career
- 1973–1976: Clemson Tigers

Senior career*
Years	Team	Apps	(Gls)
1979	New York Eagles		
1979–1982	Philadelphia Fever (indoor)		
1980–1981	Pennsylvania Stoners		
1982–1983	Detroit Express		
1983–1985	Wichita Wings (indoor)		
1984	Charlotte Gold		

International career
1980	Guyana		

Managerial career
- Washington Warthogs (assistant)
- University of the District of Columbia
- 2001–: Washington Freedom (assistant)
- * Club domestic league appearances and goals

Clyde Watson (born 10 February 1956) is a retired Guyanese footballer who played professionally in the American Soccer League. He also served as an assistant coach at the Washington Freedom.

== Life and career ==
Watson attended Clemson University, where he played on the men's soccer team from 1973 to 1976. He was All ACC each of his four seasons with the Tigers. In 2002, he was named to the ACC 50th Anniversary Team.

In 1979, he was a First Team All Star with the New York Eagles of the American Soccer League. In 1980 and 1981, he played for the Pennsylvania Stoners of the American Soccer League. Watson represented Guyana in 1982 World Cup qualifying, scoring four goals in the first round series versus Grenada. In 1982, he moved to the Detroit Express where he played the 1982 and 1983 seasons.

After retiring from playing, Watson went into the coaching ranks. Over the years as a girl's youth coach, his teams have won at least eleven Virginia State Cups, two Region 1 championships and the 2007 National Championship. In 2001, he was hired as an assistant coach with the Washington Freedom of the Women's United Soccer Association. In 1995, he served as an assistant with the Washington Warthogs of the Continental Indoor Soccer League.
