= Gérard Joseph =

Haitian footballer (born 1949)

Personal information
- Date of birth: 22 October 1949 (age 77)
- Place of birth: Haiti
- Height: 1.85 m (6 ft 1 in)
- Position: Goalkeeper

Senior career*
Years	Team	Apps	(Gls)
- Racing CH
1975	Washington Diplomats	5	(0)
1976	New York Apollo		
1980	New York United		

International career
- Haiti
- * Club domestic league appearances and goals

Gérard Joseph (born 22 October 1949) is a Haitian football goalkeeper who was a member of the Haitian squad in the 1974 FIFA World Cup. He also played for Haiti at the 1981 CONCACAF Championship versus Cuba and El Salvador. He played for Racing CH, the Washington Diplomats of the NASL and the New York Apollo and New York United of the ASL.
