= Miguel Fuentes Quiala =

Cuban footballer (born 1949)

Personal information
- Full name: Miguel Fuentes Quiala
- Date of birth: 1949 (age 76–77)
- Place of birth: Banes, Holguín, Cuba
- Position: Forward

Senior career*
Years	Team	Apps	(Gls)
1968–1977	Azucareros		
1978–1979	Holguín		

International career
1971–1979	Cuba		
Medal record
Men's football
Representing Cuba
Central American and Caribbean Games
Gold medal – first place	Medellín 1978	Team
Pan American Games
Silver medal – second place	San Juan 1979	Team
- * Club domestic league appearances and goals

Miguel Fuentes Quiala (born 1949) is a retired Cuban footballer. He played as a forward for Azucareros and Holguín throughout the 1970s as a forward. He also played for his native country of Cuba internationally for the 1971 CONCACAF Championship, the winning squad for the 1978 Central American and Caribbean Games and the 1979 Pan American Games.

== Club career ==
Fuentes began his career within his local school, defining himself through his speed and durability. Despite initially playing baseball throughout his youth, his Guatemalan teacher Carlos Rivera convinced him to switch to football in 1962. He made his first breakthrough in his success in the National School Games where he set a record high of 18 goals and would remain in the following editions until 1967. Following this, he received his first professional contract with Azucareros in 1968. Despite this initial success, an injury to his leg would prevent active play within the club until 1976. Despite his recovery however, he retired just three years later due to wanting to focus on his studies.

== International career ==
Fuentes was initially called up for the 1970 Central American and Caribbean Games but wouldn't make the final squad. He would make his proper debut in the 1971 CONCACAF Championship hosted in Trinidad and Tobago. Following his recovery, he returned to the national football team in 1976 where he was part of the gold-winning squad for the 1978 Central American and Caribbean Games and the San Juan 1979.

== Later life ==
Following his victory over Venezuela at the 1978 Central American and Caribbean Games final, he gained a degree in Physical Education from the University of Holguín. He then served as a coach, a university professor as well as a political administrator in his home province of Holguín. He has recently served as a part of the National Commission for the Cuba national football team since at least 2014, managing its operations throughout the 2010s. He has also served as a part of the Caribbean chapter of FIFA since 2018. He has also been a consistent advocate for Cuban players to play abroad in foreign leagues.
