= 1981 Copa Interamericana =

- Event: Copa Interamericana
UNAM	Nacional
(Mexico)	(Uruguay)
6	5
- on aggregate, after play-off

First leg
UNAM	Nacional
3	1
- Date: 25 March 1981
- Venue: Estadio Olímpico Universitario, Mexico City
- Referee: Rómulo Méndez (Guatemala)
- Attendance: 52,229

Second leg
Nacional	UNAM
3	1
- Date: 8 April 1981
- Venue: Estadio Centenario, Montevideo
- Referee: José Roberto Wright (Brazil)
- Attendance: 40,000

Play-off
Nacional	UNAM
1	2
- Date: 31 May 1981
- Venue: Memorial Coliseum, Los Angeles
- Referee: José Roberto Wright (Brazil)
- Attendance: 15,000

The 1981 Copa Interamericana was the 8th edition of the Copa Interamericana, the football competition co-organized by CONCACAF and CONMEBOL between the winners of the previous season's two major club tournaments in the Americas, the CONCACAF Champions' Cup and the Copa Libertadores.

The competition was contested in two-legged home-and-away format and a play-off between Mexican team UNAM, the 1980 CONCACAF Champions' Cup champions, and Uruguayan team Nacional, the 1980 Copa Libertadores champions. The first leg was hosted by UNAM on 25 March 1981 at Estadio Olímpico Universitario in Mexico City, the second leg was hosted by Nacional on 8 April 1981 at Estadio Centenario in Montevideo, while the play-off was hosted at a neutral site on 13 May 1981 at the Memorial Coliseum in Los Angeles.

UNAM defeated Nacional 6–5 on aggregate to win their first Copa Interamericana title.

== Teams ==
Team	Qualification	Previous participations (bold indicates winners)
(Mexico) UNAM	Winners of the 1980 CONCACAF Champions' Cup	None
(Uruguay) Nacional	Winners of the 1980 Copa Libertadores	1 (**1971**)

== Format ==
The Copa Interamericana is played on a home-and-away two-legged basis, with the Copa Libertadores champions hosting the second leg. If tied on aggregate, the away goals rule would not be used, and a play-off match would be played. If still tied after the play-off match, the penalty shoot-out would be used to determine the winners.

== Venues ==
1st leg	2nd leg	Play-off
Mexico City	(Uruguay) Montevideo	(United States) Los Angeles
Estadio Olímpico Universitario	Estadio Centenario	Memorial Coliseum
Capacity: **69,000**	Capacity: **60,235**	Capacity: **93,607**

== Matches ==
=== First leg ===
==== Summary ====
In the 5th minute, Hugo Sánchez opened the scoring for UNAM. In the second half, Nacional fought back and found an equaliser from Víctor Espárrago, scored in the 57th minute. Ricardo Ferretti then restored UNAM's lead, to make the score 2–1 in the 60th minute. Hugo Sánchez got his second goal of the match in the 85th minute.

==== Details ====
25 March 1981

UNAM (Mexico)	3–1	(Uruguay) Nacional
Sánchez 5', 85'; Ferretti 60'	Report	Espárrago 57'

Estadio Olímpico Universitario, Mexico City
Attendance: 30,000
Referee: Rómulo Méndez (Guatemala)

=== Second leg ===
==== Summary ====
The game was goalless until the 70th minute mark, when Wilmar Cabrera put Nacional ahead, in the 77th José Cabrera scored to make it 2–0, then Wilmar Cabrera in the 81st minute scored his second of the match to make it 3–0. However, the game was to end at 3–1 after Gustavo Vargas with three minutes to go scored for UNAM, forcing a play-off.

==== Details ====
8 April 1981

Nacional (Uruguay)	3–1	(Mexico) UNAM
W. Cabrera 70', 81'; J. Cabrera 77'	Report	Vargas 87'

Estadio Centenario, Montevideo
Attendance: 40,000
Referee: José Roberto Wright (Brazil)

=== Play-off ===
==== Summary ====
The play-off leg finally went ahead after a month with Los Angeles as the neutral site. Nacional opened the scoring at the 17th minute from José Cabrera. Ricardo Ferretti equalised at the 69th minute. In the 89th minute, Gustavo Vargas scored the winning goal for UNAM.

==== Details ====
13 May 1981

UNAM (Mexico)	2–1	(Uruguay) Nacional
Ferretti 69'; Vargas 89'	Report	J. Cabrera 62'

Memorial Coliseum, Los Angeles
Attendance: 15,000
Referee: José Roberto Wright (Brazil)

**UNAM**	**Nacional**

GK	(Mexico) Jorge Espinoza
DF	(Mexico) Rafael Amador
DF	(Mexico) Gustavo Vargas
DF	(Mexico) Jorge Paolino
DF	(Mexico) Pablo Luna
MF	(Mexico) Enrique López Zarza
MF	(Mexico) José Luis López
MF	(Mexico) Manuel Manzo
MF	(Mexico) Manuel Negrete
FW	(Mexico) Hugo Sánchez
FW	(Mexico) Ricardo Ferretti
Manager:
(Socialist Federal Republic of Yugoslavia) Bora Milutinović

GK	(Uruguay) Rodolfo Rodríguez
DF	(Uruguay) José H. Moreira
DF	(Uruguay) Aguirre
DF	(Uruguay) Juan Carlos Blanco
DF	(Uruguay) Wilmar Cabrera
MF	(Uruguay) Víctor Espárrago
MF	(Uruguay) Arsenio Luzardo	(substituted off) 84'
MF	(Uruguay) José R. Cabrera
FW	(Uruguay) Alberto Bica
FW	(Uruguay) Eduardo de la Peña
FW	(Uruguay) Julio C. Morales
Substitutes:
FW	(Uruguay) Denis Milar	(substituted on) 84'
Manager:
(Uruguay) Juan Mujica
