= Ricardo Castro (footballer) =

Mexican footballer (born 1955)

Personal information
- Full name: Ricardo Castro Valenzuela
- Date of birth: 1 August 1955 (age 71)
- Place of birth: Veracruz, Veracruz, Mexico
- Position: Forward

Senior career*
Years	Team	Apps	(Gls)
1975–1976	Veracruz		
1976–1977	Tigres UANL		
1977–1983	Zacatepec		(67)
1983–1986	Atlante		
1986–1987	Tampico Madero		

International career
1980–1981	Mexico	18	(7)
Medal record
Men's football
Representing Mexico
CONCACAF Championship
Bronze medal – third place	1981 Honduras	Team
- * Club domestic league appearances and goals

Ricardo Castro Valenzuela (born 1 August 1955) is a retired Mexican footballer. He played as a forward for Zacatepec and Atlante throughout the late 1970s and 1980s. He also represented Mexico internationally for the 1981 CONCACAF Championship.

== Club career ==
Castro would begin his career with his home club of Veracruz for their 1975–76 season, scoring his first goal against Cruz Azul at the Estadio Azteca. He later played for Tigres UANL for the following 1976–77 season where the club was nearly relegated from the top-flight of Mexican football, narrowly avoiding it to Zacatepec. Interestingly enough however, Castro then chose to play for Zacatepec where he was the top goalscorer for the 1977–78 Mexican Segunda División helped the club immediately regain promotion to the top-flight of Mexican football. That year also saw him take part in a tour to play in a friendly against China, bringing his wife Virginia Garza. His most successful season with the Cañeros was during the 1980–81 Mexican Primera División where the club made the semi-finals, narrowly missing out on the finals to Cruz Azul by a single point. He played until their 1982–83 season, going over to Atlante where he played for an additional three seasons before retiring with Tampico Madero following their 1986–87 season.

== International career ==
Castro was first called up in a friendly against Guatemala as a substitute for Héctor Tapia that ended in a 2–4 victory. The majority of his international appearances consisted of friendlies across 1980 and 1981. He later played in the 1981 CONCACAF Championship where he scored in the 4–0 beating of Cuba on 1 November 1981. He also scored in the initial winning goal against Canada that ended in a 1–1 draw on 15 November. Due to a lack of points, Mexico failed to qualify for the 1982 FIFA World Cup and Castro's international career ended.

=== International goals ===
No	Date	Venue	Opponent	Score	Result	Competition
1.	19 April 1980	Toluca 70, Toluca, Mexico	Guatemala	2–2	2–2	Friendly
2.	24 August 1980	Cricket Ground, Sydney, Australia	Australia	2–1	2–2	Friendly
3.	26 August 1980	Olympic Village, Melbourne, Australia	Australia	1–1	1–1	Friendly
4.	10 February 1981	Estadio Azteca, Mexico City, Mexico	South Korea	2–0	4–0	Friendly
5.	1 November 1981	Etadio Nacional, Tegucigalpa, Honduras	Cuba	1–0	4–0	1981 CONCACAF Championship
6.	15 November 1981	Etadio Nacional, Tegucigalpa, Honduras	Canada	1–0	1–1	1981 CONCACAF Championship
