= Alexis Peña (Venezuelan footballer) =

Venezuelan footballer (born 1956)

Personal information
- Date of birth: 1 July 1956 (age 70)

International career
Years	Team	Apps	(Gls)
- Venezuela

Alexis Peña (born 1 July 1956) is a Venezuelan footballer. He competed in the men's tournament at the 1980 Summer Olympics.
