= Jorge Maya =

Uruguayan basketball player

Personal information
- Nationality: Uruguayan
- Born: 5 May 1944
- Died: 23 December 2022 (aged 78)

Sport
- Sport: Basketball

Jorge Maya Dodera (5 May 1944 – 23 December 2022) was a Uruguayan basketball player. He competed in the men's tournament at the 1964 Summer Olympics.
