= Guillermo Mendizábal =

Mexican footballer and manager (born 1954)

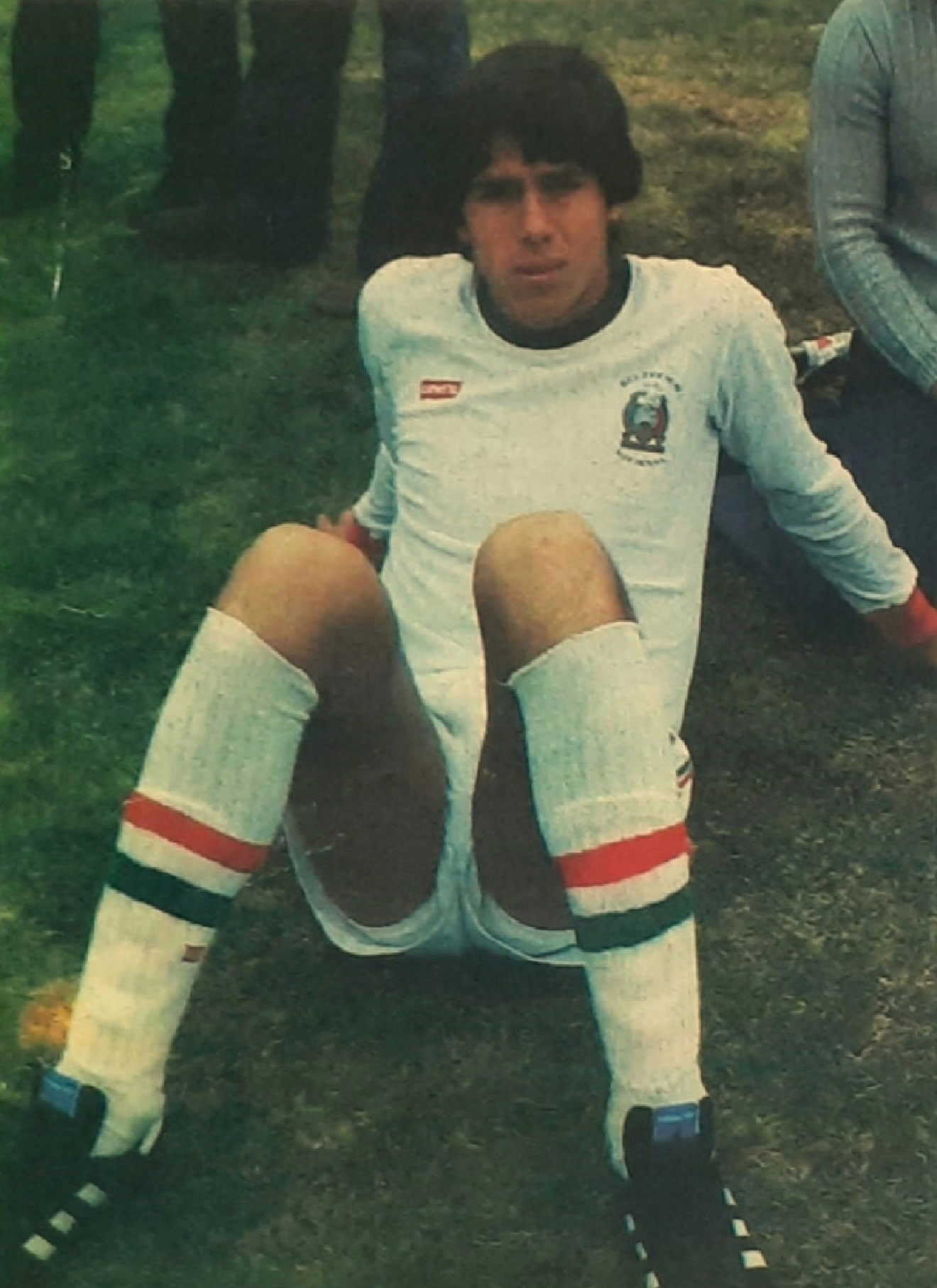
- Mendizábal at the 1978 FIFA World Cup

Personal information
- Full name: Guillermo Mendizábal Sánchez
- Date of birth: 8 October 1954 (age 72)
- Place of birth: Mexico City, Mexico
- Height: 1.78 m (5 ft 10 in)
- Position: Midfielder

Senior career*
Years	Team	Apps	(Gls)
1972–1983	Cruz Azul	266	(19)
1983–1985	UAG	59	(5)
1985–1986	Rayo Vallecano	29	(2)
1986–1991	Club Deportivo Guadalajara	101	(2)
Total		455	(28)

International career^{‡}
1978–1981	Mexico	24	(3)
- * Club domestic league appearances and goals as of December 12, 2008 ‡ National team caps and goals as of December 12, 2008

Guillermo Mendizábal Sánchez (born 8 October 1954) is a Mexican former footballer and manager.

== Club career ==
He debuted with Cruz Azul in the 1974–75 season, and helped the team win the 1978–79 and 1979-80 league titles.

In his professional day view he played as a central defender substituting Alberto Quintano, later on Raúl Cardenás placed him as a central defensive midfielder where he played the rest of his career.

While playing for Cruz Azul, Atlético Madrid board of directors became interested in Mendizábal, but could not buy his transfer because Cruz Azul owned the players card. In his place Hugo Sánchez was enrolled with the colchonero side.

After Cruz Azul, he played for Universidad Autónoma de Guadalajara, from 1983 to 1985. Later on he played a full season with Rayo Vallecano of Spain, before returning to Mexico to play for Club Deportivo Guadalajara, where he won the 1986-87 league title. In that final Guadalajara and Cruz Azul faced each in other in the final with anecdotal emphasis because while Guillermo Mendizabal was playing for Chivas, his brother Marco Antonio was playing for the celestes. In that year whichever team was going to win the title they were going to have Mendizabal in the champion's team.

During his footballer career he played for Cruz Azul, UAG, Rayo Vallecano, and Club Deportivo Guadalajara.

Guillermo retired at the age of 37 in 1991.

== International career ==
With the Mexico national team he debuted 15 February 1978. In total, he played 24 games and scored 3 goals. He played the 1978 World Cup.

No.	Date	Venue	Opponent	Score	Result	Competition	Ref.
1.	April 4, 1978	Estadio Jalisco, Guadalajara, Mexico	Bulgaria	2–0	3–0	Friendly	
2.	April 15, 1980	Estadio Mateo Flores, Guatemala City, Guatemala	Guatemala	3–2	4–2	Friendly	
3.	November 9, 1980	Estadio Azteca, Mexico City, Mexico	United States	3–0	5–1	1982 FIFA World Cup qualification	

== As a manager ==
After hanging his boots, he began his managing career in 1995, at León AC where he only last the 1995–96 season. He would also manage Correcaminos de la UAT in the Primera División A in 2003.

== Nickname ==
At the time he was playing for Cruz Azul his teammates would call him "Mendi" (to shorten his last name) and the "M" was changed to a "W" and since then his being known as "Wendy".
