= Hugo Madera =

Cuban footballer (born 1951)

Personal information
- Full name: Fermín Hugo Madera Ramírez
- Date of birth: 24 November 1951 (age 74)
- Place of birth: Camagüey, Camagüey Province. Cuba
- Height: 1.84 m (6 ft 0 in)
- Position: Goalkeeper

Youth career
- 1967–1968: ESPA

Senior career*
Years	Team	Apps	(Gls)
1969–1982	Granjeros		

International career
1970–1980	Cuba		(0)
- * Club domestic league appearances and goals

Fermín Hugo Madera Ramírez is a retired Cuban footballer. He played as a goalkeeper for Camagüey throughout the 1970s as well as the early 1980s. He was recognized for his international career, representing his home country of Cuba in the Pan American Games as well as two editions of the Summer Olympics, distinguishing himself as one of the best Cuban goalkeepers.

== Club career ==
He began his youth career playing for ESPA in 1967 after winning the National School Sports Games a year prior. There, he trained his jumping as well as kicking abilities, also being known for having a tendency of getting impulsive when facing more strenuous circumstances. His skills were recognised as he signed his first professional reason with Granjeros as his inaugural season saw the club win the Campeonato Nacional de Cuba 1969 with two more titles in the 1970 and the 1975 editions of the top flight of Cuban football before his retirement in 1982.

== International career ==
Madera began his international career by representing his home country of Cuba in the 1970 Central American and Caribbean Games where Cuba ultimately won the tournament. He was then be called up for a away friendly against North Vietnam as a part of a politically influenced sporting project to improve Cuba's standing in the world of football. He later played in the succeeding 1974 and 1978 Central American and Caribbean Games as well as the 1979 Pan American Games. His international exodus would come in his participation at the Summer Olympics, participating in Monteal 1976 as well as Moscow 1980 where the club made the knockout stage as well as it being his final international tournament.
