= Tibor Ivanics =

Hungarian football manager

Personal information
- Date of birth: 29 June 1937 (age 89)
- Place of birth: Hungary
- Date of death: 28 June 2014 (aged 76)
- Place of death: Hungary

Managerial career
- Years: Team
- 1971–1975: Cuba
- 1975–1978: Dorogi FC
- 1978–1982: Cuba
- 1982–1983: Dorogi FC
- 1983–1984: Bajai LSE

Tibor Ivanics (29 June 1937 – 28 June 2014) was a Hungarian football manager.

== Career ==
Ivanics was described as a "outstanding individual of Hungarian football... made a name for himself as a football player, coach and Olympic historian". In 1975, he was appointed manager of Hungarian side Dorogi FC. He helped the club achieve promotion. In 1979, he was appointed manager of the Cuba national football team. He managed the team at the 1980 Summer Olympics.
