= Glenn Kwidama =

Netherlands Antilles footballer

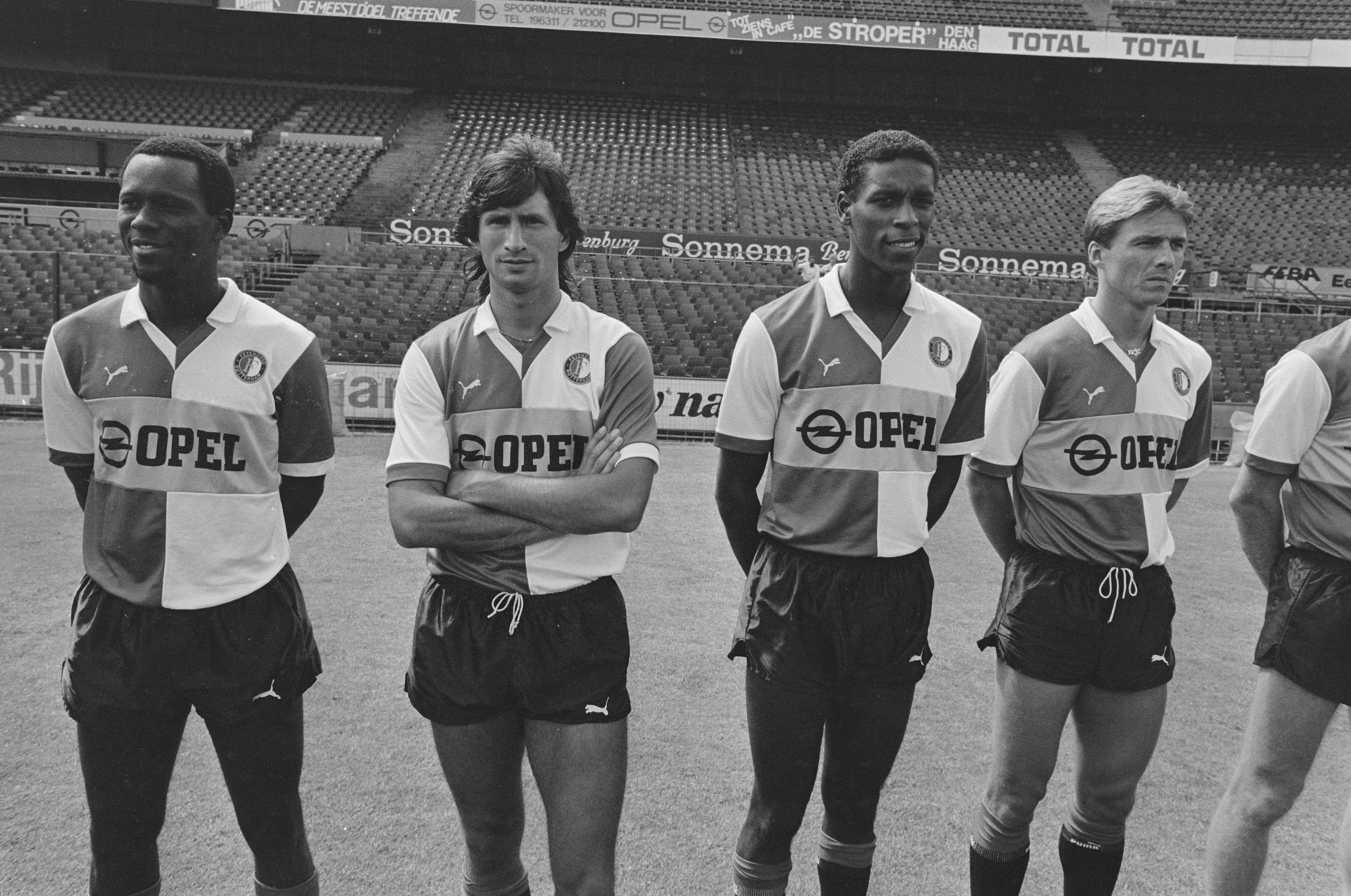
- Kwidama (left, 1985)

Personal information
- Date of birth: 31 July 1962 (age 64)
- Place of birth: Willemstad, Netherlands Antilles
- Position: Midfielder

Senior career*
Years	Team	Apps	(Gls)
–1985	Sithoc		
1985	→ Undeba (guest)		
1985–1986	Feyenoord	3	(0)
- Sithoc
1989-1991	Zwolsche Boys		(6)

International career
- Netherlands Antilles
- * Club domestic league appearances and goals

Glenn Kwidama (born 31 July 1962) is a former Netherlands Antilles international footballer who played as a midfielder.

== Career statistics ==
=== Club ===
Club	Season	League			Cup		Other		Total	
Club	Season	Division	Apps	Goals	Apps	Goals	Apps	Goals	Apps	Goals
Feyenoord	1985–86	Eredivisie	3	0	0	0	0	0	3	0
Career total			3	0	0	0	0	0	3	0
