= Carlos Bracamontes =

Mexican footballer and manager (born 1959)

Personal information
- Full name: Carlos Alejandro Bracamontes Zenizo
- Date of birth: 4 January 1959 (age 67)
- Place of birth: Colima City, Colima
- Height: 1.78 m (5 ft 10 in)
- Position: Midfielder

Senior career*
Years	Team	Apps	(Gls)
1980–1983	Deportivo Neza	12	(1)
1983–1985	Atlético Morelia	66	(6)
1986–1987	Club León	26	(2)
1986–1987	Tecos UAG	1	(0)

Managerial career
- 1996–1999: Club León
- 2003–2004: Lagartos de Tabasco
- 2005: Dorados de Sinaloa
- 2006: Puebla
- 2008–2009: Petroleros de Salamanca
- 2016–2018: Yalmakán
- 2018–2019: Irapuato
- 2019–2020: Pioneros de Cancún
- 2020–2024: Inter Playa del Carmen
- * Club domestic league appearances and goals

Carlos Alejandro Bracamontes Zenizo (Note: In this Spanish name, the first or paternal surname is Bracamontes and the second or maternal family name is Zenizo.) (born 4 January 1959) is a Mexican football manager and former player.
