= Gordon Braithwaite =

Guyanese footballer (born 1957)

Personal information
- Date of birth: 30 November 1957 (age 68)
- Place of birth: Guyana
- Position: Defender

College career
Years	Team	Apps	(Gls)
1978	Clemson Tigers		

Senior career*
Years	Team	Apps	(Gls)
–1978	Pele FC		
- Western Tigers FC

International career
1977–1984	Guyana		

Managerial career
- 1991–1992: Guyana
- * Club domestic league appearances and goals

Gordon Braithwaite (born 30 November 1957) is a Guyanese football manager and former footballer.

== Life and career ==
Braithwaite was born on 30 November 1957 in Guyana. He mainly played as a defender, but previously operated as a midfielder. He was known for his strength and has been nicknamed "Ultimate Warrior". He has been a rastafarian and a vegetarian. He started his career with Guyanese side Pele FC and played for the club in the CONCACAF Champions Cup. He attended Clemson University in the United States, playing for their soccer team. He studied Spanish and French.

After that, he signed for Guyanese side Western Tigers FC. He was a Guyana international. He captained the team. He played for the Guyana national football team for 1986 FIFA World Cup qualification. In 1991, he was appointed manager of the Guyana national football team. He managed the Guyana national football team for 1994 FIFA World Cup qualification, 1991 CONCACAF Gold Cup qualification and 1993 CONCACAF Gold Cup qualification. He has been described as a "true national treasure... left an indelible mark on the sport". He has two sons.
