= Omar Arroyo =

Costa Rican footballer (born 1956)

Personal information
- Full name: Omar Arroyo Rodríguez
- Date of birth: 22 November 1956 (age 69)
- Place of birth: San Ramón, Costa Rica
- Position: Forward

Senior career*
Years	Team	Apps	(Gls)
1977–1980	Ramonense		
1982–1988	Alajuelense		
1989	San Carlos		
Total		378	(94)

International career
1980–1985	Costa Rica	15	

Managerial career
- 2002: Municipal Naranjo
- * Club domestic league appearances and goals

Omar Arroyo Rodríguez (born 22 November 1956 in San Ramón, Costa Rica) is a retired Costa Rican professional footballer. He played for several clubs in Costa Rica.

== Club career ==
At the club level, Arroyo played for Ramonense, Alajuelense and San Carlos. He won the Primera División de Costa Rica with Alajuelense during the 1982–83 and 1983-84 seasons. He scored a total of 94 goals in 378 league games. On 3 June 1984, he scored one of the fastest goals in the league's history, netting after 15 seconds for Alajuelense against San Carlos.

== International career ==
Arroyo made 15 appearances for the full Costa Rica national football team from 1980 to 1985. He also played at the 1980 Olympic Games.

== Managerial career ==
After retiring in 1989 due to a persistent knee injury, he worked for the Bank of Costa Rica until 1996. He returned in a role as manager of second division side Municipal Naranjo in 2002.
