= Roberto Espinosa =

Cuban footballer (born 1959)

Personal information
- Full name: Roberto Espinosa Cabriales
- Date of birth: 8 October 1959 (age 67)
- Place of birth: Cienfuegos, Cuba
- Height: 1.75 m (5 ft 9 in)
- Position: Midfielder

Senior career*
Years	Team	Apps	(Gls)
1980-1985	Cienfuegos		

International career
1980	Cuba	3	(1)
- * Club domestic league appearances and goals

Roberto Espinosa Cabriales (born 8 October 1959) is a Cuban footballer. He competed in the men's tournament at the 1980 Summer Olympics.
