= Daniel Montilla =

Argentine footballer

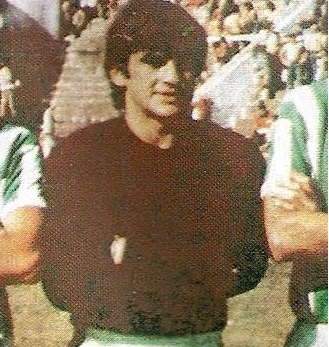
- Montilla in 1973.

Personal information
- Full name: Eduardo Daniel Montilla
- Date of birth: 28 April 1950 (age 76)
- Place of birth: Argentina
- Position: Goalkeeper

Senior career*
Years	Team	Apps	(Gls)
1967–1971	Racing Club	4	(0)
1972	All Boys	31	(0)
1973–1975	Banfield	36	(0)
1976–1977	Independiente Rivadavia	14	(0)
1978–1981	Deportes Concepción	125	(0)
1982	Palestino	1	(0)
1982	Deportes Arica	29	(0)
1983–1984	Fernández Vial	57	(0)
1985–1989	Deportes Concepción	90	(0)

Managerial career
- 1994: Lota Schwager
- 1999: Ñublense
- * Club domestic league appearances and goals

Eduardo Daniel Montilla (born 28 April 1950), known as Daniel Montilla, is an Argentine former football goalkeeper and manager.

== Playing career ==
A goalkeeper, Montilla made his senior debut with Racing Club de Avellaneda at the age of 17 in an away match against the Brazilian giant Flamengo. At league level, he made his debut in the 1968 Campeonato Metropolitano second matchday against Banfield.

In his homeland, he also played for All Boys, Banfield and Independiente Rivadavia.

In 1978, Montilla moved to Chile to join Cobreloa in the Primera División, but he finally joined Deportes Concepción. He stood out with them in 1978–1981 and 1985–1989.

In Chile, Montilla also played for Palestino, Deportes Arica, and Fernández Vial, the classic rival of Deportes Concepción.

== Coaching career ==
Montilla started his career as a head coach with Chilean club Lota Schwager in 1994.

Later, Montilla started a football academy in Concepción, Chile.

== Personal life ==
Montilla married and settled in Concepción, Chile.
