= Rodolfo Carvajal =

Venezuelan footballer (born 1952)

Personal information
- Date of birth: 8 February 1952 (age 74)
- Position: Forward

International career
Years	Team	Apps	(Gls)
- Venezuela

Rodolfo Carvajal (born 8 February 1952) is a Venezuelan footballer. He competed in the men's tournament at the 1980 Summer Olympics.
