= Luis Dreke =

Cuban footballer

Personal information
- Full name: Luis Roger Zenón Dreke
- Date of birth: 9 July 1953 (age 73)
- Height: 1.70 m (5 ft 7 in)
- Position: Defender

Senior career*
Years	Team	Apps	(Gls)
- Matanzas

International career
- Cuba
- * Club domestic league appearances and goals

Luis Roger Zenón Dreke (born 9 July 1953) is a Cuban footballer. He competed in the men's tournament at the 1980 Summer Olympics.
