= Cheche Vidal =

Venezuelan footballer (born 1959)

Personal information
- Full name: Juan Jose Vidal Noya
- Date of birth: May 29, 1959 (age 67)
- Place of birth: Vigo, Spain
- Position: Defender

Youth career
- 1981–1983: Boston University Terriers

Senior career*
Years	Team	Apps	(Gls)
- Deportivo Italia

International career
- Venezuela
- * Club domestic league appearances and goals

Juan Jose "Cheche" Vidal Noya is a retired Venezuelan association football defender who was a member of the Venezuelan Olympic soccer team at the 1980 Summer Olympics. He was the 1979 Venezuela Footballer of the Year and was the World Cup USA Vice President in charge of technology at the 1994 FIFA World Cup.

== College ==
Vidal attended Boston University, where he played on the men's soccer team from 1981 to 1983. Vidal was a 1981 Third-Team All-American, but lost the 1982 season to a knee injury. He came back in 1983 and was selected as a First-Team All-American. In 1984, he graduated with a master's degree in mechanical engineering and sports applied technology. In 1998, he was inducted into the Terriers Hall of Fame.

== Professional ==
Vidal was the 1979 Venezuelan Footballer of the Year as a member of Deportivo Italia.

== National team ==
Vidal played on both the Venezuelan national and Olympic teams. He was a member of the Venezuela national team at the 1979 Copa America. He also played two games at the 1980 Summer Olympics.

== Technology ==
1989 marked the decisive play in his career; he was recognized in the US for his technological skills. His then futuristic vision of implanting the first interactive multimedia network in a sporting event went from project to facts when being contracted by the organizing committee of World Cup USA 94 like vice-president of Technology and member of the Management Committee. Among the responsibilities assigned to Vidal was planning and managing the telecommunication, computing and electronics functions of the World Cup USA 94. For this and other projects received several awards, such as the one granted by Var Business Magazine.

Through En-Línea, a company that established in Los Angeles, it marked a milestone in the sports world by creating the website of the International Football Federation (FIFA), which was followed by sites of regional confederations such as Conmebol. In Caracas he created DeRed, which develops technology for its international projects, and has partnered with the Spanish group Santa Mónica and the communications agency Beyond. He then formed Beyond En-Línea.

In 1998, he founded Platinum with the Olympic medalist Rafael Vidal, a pioneer in the application of marketing in Venezuela. Then created Fútbol Mejor, an organization conceived for the rescue and optimization of that sport in Venezuela.
