= David Bueso =

Honduran football midfielder (1955

Personal information
- Full name: David Bueso Guerrero
- Date of birth: 5 May 1955
- Place of birth: Honduras
- Position: Midfielder

Senior career*
Years	Team	Apps	(Gls)
1978–1982	Motagua		(8)

International career
1981	Honduras		
- * Club domestic league appearances and goals

David Bueso Guerrero (5 May 1955) is a Honduran former football midfielder who was a non-playing squad member of Honduras at the 1982 FIFA World Cup David is currently residing in Miami, Fl. .

== Club career ==
Bueso played for F.C. Motagua for whom he scored 8 career goals. He won the Honduran league title with Motagua in the 1978-79 season.

== International career ==
Bueso represented his country in 3 FIFA World Cup qualification matches, scoring 2 goals in the process.

=== International goals ===
Scores and results list Honduras' goal tally first.

#	Date	Venue	Opponent	Score	Result	Competition
1	3 November 1981	Estadio Tiburcio Carías Andino, Tegucigalpa, Honduras	Haiti	1-0	4-0	1982 FIFA World Cup qualification
2	8 November 1981	Estadio Tiburcio Carías Andino, Tegucigalpa, Honduras	Cuba	1-0	2-0	1982 FIFA World Cup qualification
