= Jorge Massó =

Cuban footballer

Personal information
- Full name: Jorge Rafael Massó Mustelier
- Date of birth: 16 February 1950 (age 76)
- Place of birth: Santiago de Cuba, Cuba
- Height: 1.70 m (5 ft 7 in)
- Position: Forward

Senior career*
Years	Team	Apps	(Gls)
- La Habana
- Ciudad de La Habana

International career
1971–1987	Cuba	32	(1)
- * Club domestic league appearances and goals

Jorge Rafael Massó Mustelier (born 16 February 1950) is a Cuban former footballer, born in Santiago de Cuba.

== Club career ==
Born in Santiago de Cuba, Massó played for La Habana in the city his parents moved to 8 months after his birth.

== International career ==
He made his international debut for Cuba in 1971 and has earned a total of 32 caps, scoring 1 goal. He represented his country in 4 FIFA World Cup qualification matches.

He competed in the 1976 Summer Olympics and in the 1980 Summer Olympics and won a bronze medal at the 1971 Pan American Games and a silver medal at the 1979 Pan American Games.

== Retirement ==
He was given a farewell match in August 1989 and went on to live in Venezuela with his wife Norelkis.
