= Amado Povea =

Cuban footballer

Personal information
- Date of birth: 30 April 1955 (age 71)
- Place of birth: San Cristóbal, Cuba
- Height: 1.79 m (5 ft 10 in)
- Position: Defender

Senior career*
Years	Team	Apps	(Gls)
- Pinar del Río

International career
- Cuba
- * Club domestic league appearances and goals

Amado Povea (born 30 April 1955) is a Cuban footballer. He competed in the men's tournament at the 1980 Summer Olympics.
