= Angel de Jesús =

Venezuelan footballer (born 1957)

Personal information
- Full name: Angel de Jesús Castillo
- Date of birth: 18 April 1957 (age 69)
- Place of birth: Maracay
- Position: Forward

Senior career*
| Years | Team | Apps | (Gls) |
| 1978–1987 | Valencia F.C. | | |
| 1988–1989 | Deportivo Italia | | |

International career
- Venezuela
- * Club domestic league appearances and goals

Angel de Jesús Castillo (born 18 April 1957) is a Venezuelan former footballer. He competed in the men's tournament at the 1980 Summer Olympics.
