= Robert Iarusci =

Canadian soccer player

Bob Iarusci
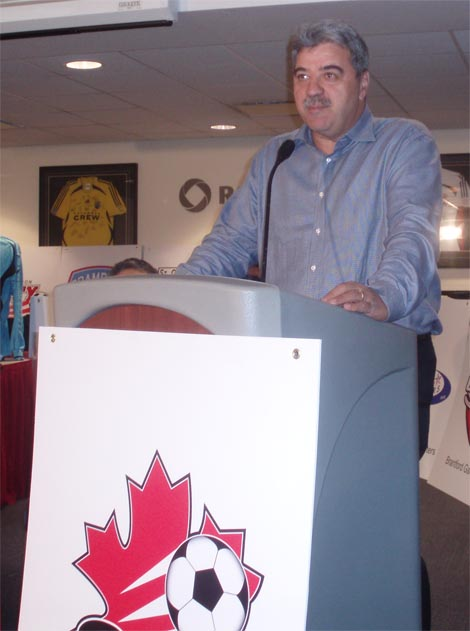
- Iarusci in 2010

Personal information
- Full name: Robert Iarusci
- Date of birth: November 8, 1954 (age 71)
- Place of birth: Toronto, Ontario, Canada
- Position: Defender

Senior career*
Years	Team	Apps	(Gls)
1973–1975	Toronto Italia		
1976–1977	Toronto Metros-Croatia	45	(3)
1977–1978	New York Cosmos	19	(2)
1979–1980	Washington Diplomats	59	(4)
1981–1983	New York Cosmos	72	(3)
1981–1982	New York Cosmos (indoor)	16	(2)
1984	San Diego Sockers	22	(0)

International career
1976–1983	Canada	27	(2)
- * Club domestic league appearances and goals

Robert Iarusci (born November 8, 1954) is a former star NASL player and member of the Canadian national soccer team. In 2012 as part of the Canadian Soccer Association's centennial celebration, he was named to the all-time Canada XI men's team.

== Club career ==
A right back, Iarusci played in the National Soccer League with Toronto Italia in 1973. He would play with Italia for three seasons from 1973 till 1975. He began his NASL career with his hometown Toronto Metros-Croatia, playing the 1976 and part of 1977. He played every game as the Toronto won the league championship in 1976. Iarusci played nearly the entire 1977 season in Toronto, but was traded at the end of the season to the New York Cosmos where he saw time in one game in 1977. He also played the 1978 season in New York, as they won consecutive Soccer Bowls. He was traded in the Spring of 1979 to the Washington Diplomats and played there two seasons. Iarusci returned to the Cosmos to play 1981 through 1983, and finished with the San Diego Sockers as the league folded following its 1984 season. Overall Iarusci won four Soccer Bowl titles, three of them in a row.

== International career ==
Iarusci played 27 times for Canada from 1976 through 1983 and captained the team for a number of games. He scored twice, both in qualification for the 1982 World Cup and playing as sweeper. The first goal on November 1, 1980, in a 2–1 win over the U.S. in Vancouver and the second in Canada's last match of the 1981 CONCACAF Championship tournament against Cuba. The game finished 2–2 and Canada, along with Mexico, failed to qualify for the World Cup, finishing a point shy of second place qualifier El Salvador.

=== International goals ===
Scores and results list Canada's goal tally first.

#	Date	Venue	Opponent	Score	Result	Competition
1	1 November 1980	Empire Stadium, Vancouver, Canada	United States	1–0	2–1	1982 FIFA World Cup qualification
2	21 November 1981	Estadio Tiburcio Carías Andino, Tegucigalpa, Honduras	Cuba	2–2	2–2	1982 FIFA World Cup qualification

== Post-retirement ==
Iarusci was an inaugural member of Canadian Soccer Hall of Fame, inducted in 2000. He is currently chairman of the Toronto Azzurri Soccer Club and vice president of the North York Hearts Soccer Club. He is a co-host on Sportsnet 590's "The Soccer Show" and also a colour commentator for Toronto FC home games broadcasts/webcasts on the station.
