= Efraín Gutiérrez =

Honduran footballer (born 1954)

Personal information
- Full name: Cesar Efraín Gutiérrez Álvarez
- Date of birth: 7 May 1954 (age 72)
- Place of birth: La Ceiba, Honduras
- Position: Defender

Senior career*
Years	Team	Apps	(Gls)
1981–1982	Pumas UNAH		

International career
	Honduras	15	(0)

Managerial career
- 2000: Pumas UNAH
- * Club domestic league appearances and goals

César Efraín Gutiérrez Álvarez (born 7 May 1954) is a Honduran football defender who played for Honduras in the 1982 FIFA World Cup.

== Club career ==
Nicknamed Fayito, Gutiérrez played for Pumas UNAH as a rightback.

== International career ==
Gutiérrez represented his country in 9 FIFA World Cup qualification matches and played in two games at the 1982 FIFA World Cup in Spain.

== Managerial career ==
He was Pumas' manager when they lost 0-8 to Platense in 2000. He was the national women's team coach in 2010.
