= Carlos Loredo =

Cuban footballer

Personal information
- Full name: Carlos Loredo Perez
- Date of birth: 14 October 1951
- Date of death: 17 June 1998 (aged 46)
- Height: 1.74 m (5 ft 9 in)
- Position: Forward

Senior career*
Years	Team	Apps	(Gls)
- Ciudad La Habana

International career
1975-1987	Cuba	30	(0)
- * Club domestic league appearances and goals

Carlos Loredo Perez (14 October 1951 – 17 June 1998) was a Cuban footballer. He competed in the men's tournament at the 1980 Summer Olympics.
