= 1981 CONCACAF Championship =

Campeonato de Naciones de CONCACAF 1981 (Spanish)

Tournament details
- Host country: Honduras
- Dates: 1–22 November
- Teams: 6 (from 1 confederation)
- Venue: 1 (in 1 host city)

Final positions
- Champions: Honduras (1st title)
- Runners-up: El Salvador
- Third place: Mexico
- Fourth place: Canada

Tournament statistics
- Matches played: 15
- Goals scored: 28 (1.87 per match)
- Attendance: 470,484 (31,366 per match)
- Top scorer: (Mexico) Hugo Sánchez (3 goals)

The 1981 CONCACAF Championship, the eighth edition of the CONCACAF Championship, was held in Honduras from 1 to 22 November. All games were played in the Estadio Tiburcio Carías Andino in Tegucigalpa. This tournament was won by the host, Honduras, who earned their first title and secured for the first time a place in the FIFA World Cup, as the tournament also served as qualification to Spain 1982. The North, Central American and Caribbean zone was allocated two places (out of 24) in the final tournament. This edition was marked by an upset as Mexico, traditional CONCACAF heavyweights and needing a win to go through, were eliminated by Honduras. The 0–0 tie between Mexico and Honduras qualified El Salvador to participate in the World Cup as the CONCACAF runners-up. El Salvador also became the first Central American team to qualify for more than one World Cup. This would be the last tournament which would feature a host nation for the final round.

== Venue ==
Tegucigalpa
Estadio Tiburcio Carías Andino
Capacity: 35,000
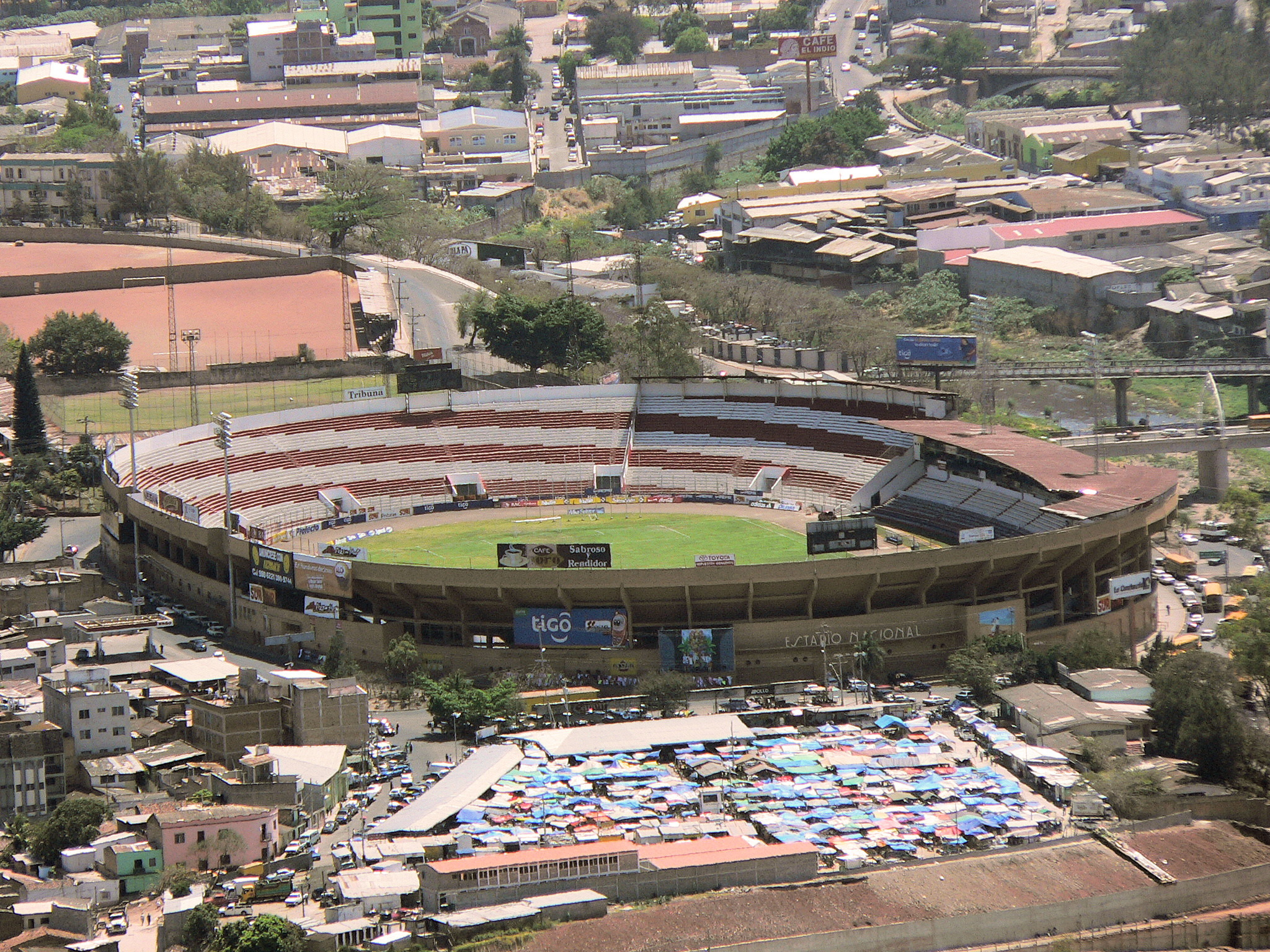

== Qualified teams ==
=== Teams ===
Team	Method of qualification	Total times qualified	Last time qualified	Previous best performance
Canada	North American Zone winners	2	1977	Fourth place (1977)
Cuba	Caribbean Zone Group A winners	2	1971	Fourth place (1971)
El Salvador	Central American Zone runners-up	4	1977	Runners-up (1963)
Haiti	Caribbean Zone Group B winners	6	1977	Winners (1973)
Honduras (host)	Central American Zone winners	5	1973	Runners-up (1967)
Mexico (title holders)	North American Zone runners-up	8	1977	Winners (1965, 1971, 1977)

== Standings ==
Pos	Team	Pld	W	D	L	GF	GA	GD	Pts	Qualification
1	Honduras	5	3	2	0	8	1	+7	8	1982 FIFA World Cup
2	El Salvador	5	2	2	1	2	1	+1	6	1982 FIFA World Cup
3	Mexico	5	1	3	1	6	3	+3	5	
4	Canada	5	1	3	1	6	6	0	5	
5	Cuba	5	1	2	2	4	8	−4	4	
6	Haiti	5	0	2	3	2	9	−7	2	

Source: RSSSF

== Matches ==
1 November 1981

Mexico	4–0	Cuba
Castro 18'; H. Sánchez 43', 50'; Manzo 53'

Estadio Tiburcio Carías Andino, Tegucigalpa, Honduras
Attendance: 40,720
Referee: Méndez Molina (Guatemala)
2 November 1981

Canada	1–0	El Salvador
Stojanovic 90'

Estadio Tiburcio Carías Andino, Tegucigalpa, Honduras
Attendance: 31,570
Referee: Pagano Trucios (Peru)
3 November 1981

Honduras	4–0	Haiti
Buezo 35'; Urquía 40'; Laing 64'; Figueroa 75'

Estadio Tiburcio Carías Andino, Tegucigalpa, Honduras
Attendance: 45,386
Referee: Aragão (Brazil)

6 November 1981

Haiti	1–1	Canada
Romulas 34'		Stojanovic 50'

Estadio Tiburcio Carías Andino, Tegucigalpa, Honduras
Attendance: 33,237
Referee: Gracias Regalado (Guatemala)
6 November 1981

Mexico	0–1	El Salvador
		Hernández 81'

Estadio Tiburcio Carías Andino, Tegucigalpa, Honduras
Attendance: 33,237
Referee: Aragão (Brazil)
8 November 1981

Honduras	2–0	Cuba
Buezo 36'; Costly 69'

Estadio Tiburcio Carías Andino, Tegucigalpa, Honduras
Attendance: 33,876
Referee: Siles Calderón (Costa Rica)

11 November 1981

El Salvador	0–0	Cuba

Estadio Tiburcio Carías Andino, Tegucigalpa, Honduras
Attendance: 22,774
Referee: Socha (United States)
11 November 1981

Mexico	1–1	Haiti
H. Sánchez 87'		Cadet 47'

Estadio Tiburcio Carías Andino, Tegucigalpa, Honduras
Attendance: 22,774
Referee: Pagano Trucios (Peru)
12 November 1981

Honduras	2–1	Canada
Caballero 12'; Figueroa 40'		Bridge 19'

Estadio Tiburcio Carías Andino, Tegucigalpa, Honduras
Attendance: 38,953
Referee: Méndez Molina (Guatemala)

15 November 1981

Haiti	0–2	Cuba
		Mathieu 55' (o.g.); Núñez 90'

Estadio Tiburcio Carías Andino, Tegucigalpa, Honduras
Attendance: 22,396
Referee: Bijlhout (Suriname)
15 November 1981

Mexico	1–1	Canada
Castro 29'		Bridge 57'

Estadio Tiburcio Carías Andino, Tegucigalpa, Honduras
Attendance: 22,395
Referee: Socha (United States)
16 November 1981

Honduras	0–0	El Salvador

Estadio Tiburcio Carías Andino, Tegucigalpa, Honduras
Attendance: 39,882
Referee: Siles Calderón (Costa Rica)

19 November 1981

Haiti	0–1	El Salvador
		Huezo 18' (pen.)

Estadio Tiburcio Carías Andino, Tegucigalpa, Honduras
Attendance: 16,826
Referee: Downer (Trinidad and Tobago)
21 November 1981

Cuba	2–2	Canada
Núñez 2'; Rodríguez 74'		McLeod 48'; Iarusci 84'

Estadio Tiburcio Carías Andino, Tegucigalpa, Honduras
Attendance: 16,458
Referee: Pagano Trucios (Peru)
22 November 1981

Honduras	0–0	Mexico

Estadio Tiburcio Carías Andino, Tegucigalpa, Honduras
Attendance: 50,000
Referee: Socha (United States)

1981 CONCACAF Championship winners

Honduras
First title

== Qualified teams to the 1982 FIFA World Cup ==
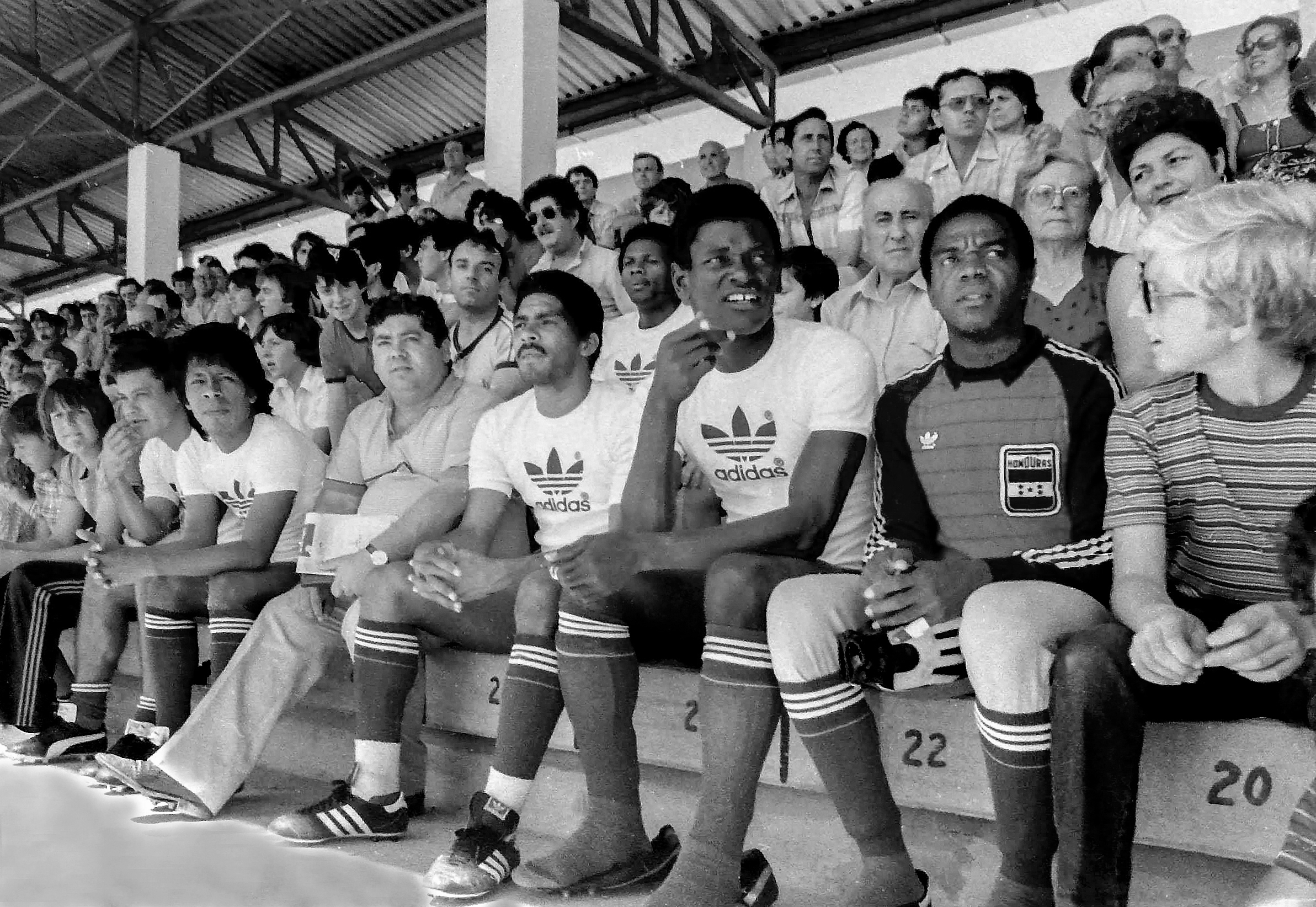
The Honduran team shortly before their debut at the 1982 FIFA World Cup

Team	Method of qualification	Date of qualification	Finals appearance	Last appearance	Consecutive finals appearances	Previous best performance
Honduras	Winners	16 November 1981	1st	—	1	—
El Salvador	Runners-up	22 November 1981	2nd	1970	1	First round (1970)

== Goalscorers ==
3 goals

- (Mexico) Hugo Sánchez

2 goals

- (Canada) Ian Bridge
- (Canada) Mike Stojanović
- (Cuba) Ramón Núñez
- (Honduras) David Buezo
- (Honduras) José Roberto Figueroa
- (Mexico) Ricardo Castro

1 goal

- (Canada) Bob Iarusci
- (Canada) Wes McLeod
- (Cuba) Jorge Luis Rodríguez
- (El Salvador) Ever Hernández
- (El Salvador) Norberto Huezo
- (Haiti) Daniel Cadet
- (Haiti) Gerald Romulas
- (Honduras) Anthony Costly
- (Honduras) Carlos Orlando Caballero
- (Honduras) Eduardo Laing
- (Honduras) Jorge Urquía
- (Mexico) Manuel Manzo

1 own goal

- (Haiti) Frantz Mathieu (playing against Cuba)

== Team of the Tournament ==
Ideal XI by RSSSF
Goalkeeper	Defenders	Midfielders	Forwards
(El Salvador) Luis Guevara Mora	(Canada) Ian Bridge (El Salvador) Francisco Osorto (Honduras) Efraín Gutiérrez (Honduras) Jaime Villegas	(El Salvador) Norberto Huezo (Honduras) Ramón Maradiaga	(Cuba) Ramón Núñez (Honduras) Carlos Caballero (Honduras) José Figueroa (Mexico) Hugo Sánchez

== Notes ==
To date, this is the last time that Mexico failed to qualify for a FIFA World Cup. (Mexico did not appear in the 1990 FIFA World Cup as they were banned in light of a scandal in which they used overage players in a youth tournament.)
