= Calixto Martínez (footballer) =

Cuban footballer

Personal information
- Full name: Calixto Martínez Quesada
- Date of birth: 14 October 1952 (age 74)
- Place of birth: San Cristóbal, Cuba
- Height: 1.77 m (5 ft 10 in)
- Position: Goalkeeper

Senior career*
Years	Team	Apps	(Gls)
- Pinar del Río

International career
- Cuba
- * Club domestic league appearances and goals

Calixto Martínez Quesada (born 14 October 1952) is a Cuban footballer. He competed in the men's tournament at the 1980 Summer Olympics.
