= Luis Sánchez (Cuban footballer) =

Cuban footballer

Personal information
- Full name: Luis Manuel Sánchez Téllez
- Date of birth: 23 February 1952 (age 74)
- Height: 1.61 m (5 ft 3 in)
- Position: Defender

Senior career*
| Years | Team | Apps | (Gls) |
- Ciudad La Habana

International career
- Cuba
- * Club domestic league appearances and goals

Luis Manuel Sánchez Téllez (born 23 February 1952) is a Cuban footballer. He competed in the men's tournament at the 1980 Summer Olympics.
