= Dagoberto Lara =

Cuban footballer

Personal information
- Full name: Dagoberto Lara Soriano
- Date of birth: 16 April 1952 (age 74)
- Place of birth: Cienfuegos, Cuba
- Height: 1.74 m (5 ft 9 in)
- Position: Forward

Senior career*
Years	Team	Apps	(Gls)
–1977	Azucareros		
1978–1990	Cienfuegos		

International career
- Cuba
- * Club domestic league appearances and goals

Dagoberto Lara Soriano (born 16 April 1952) is a Cuban footballer. He competed in the men's tournament at the 1980 Summer Olympics.
