= 1980–81 Mexican Primera División season =

39th professional season of the top-flight football league in Mexico

Primera División de México
- Season: 1980–81
- Champions: UNAM (2nd title)
- Relegated: Unión de Curtidores
- Champions' Cup: UNAM; Cruz Azul
- Matches: 406
- Goals: 1,060 (2.61 per match)

Statistics of Primera División de México for the 1980–81 season.

== Overview ==
It was contested by 20 teams, and UNAM won the championship.

Atletas Campesinos was promoted from Segunda División.

Unión de Curtidores was relegated to Segunda División.

== Teams ==
=== Stadiums and locations ===
Location of the 1980-81 Primera División teams

Team	City	Venue
América	Mexico City	Azteca
Atlante	Mexico City	Azteca
Atlas	Guadalajara, Jalisco	Jalisco
Atletas Campesinos	Querétaro, Querétaro	Municipal de Querétaro
Atlético Español	Mexico City	Azteca
Atlético Potosino	San Luis Potosí, S.L.P.	Plan de San Luis
Cruz Azul	Mexico City	Azteca
Guadalajara	Guadalajara, Jalisco	Jalisco
León	León, Guanajuato	León
Monterrey	Monterrey, Nuevo León	Tecnológico
Neza	Nezahualcóyotl, State of Mexico	Municipal de Texcoco
Puebla	Puebla, Puebla	Cuauhtémoc
Tampico	Tampico, Tamaulipas	Tamaulipas
Tecos	Zapopan, Jalisco	Tres de Marzo
Toluca	Toluca, State of Mexico	Toluca 70
Unión de Curtidores	León, Guanajuato	La Martinica
UANL	Monterrey, Nuevo León	Universitario
UdeG	Guadalajara, Jalisco	Jalisco
UNAM	Mexico City	Olímpico Universitario
Zacatepec	Zacatepec, Morelos	Agustín Coruco Díaz

== Group stage ==
=== Group 1 ===
Pos	Team	Pld	W	D	L	GF	GA	GD	Pts	Qualification
1	Atlético Español	38	15	12	11	43	43	0	42	Playoff
2	Toluca	38	14	12	12	47	41	+6	40	Playoff
3	Monterrey	38	12	14	12	50	55	−5	38	
4	América	38	11	14	13	53	49	+4	36	
5	Atlas	38	7	13	18	30	51	−21	27	

=== Group 2 ===
Pos	Team	Pld	W	D	L	GF	GA	GD	Pts	Qualification
1	Cruz Azul	38	14	14	10	45	36	+9	42	Playoff
2	Deportivo Neza	38	13	15	10	42	39	+3	41	Playoff
3	Puebla	38	12	13	13	56	59	−3	37	
4	UDG	38	11	10	17	44	55	−11	32	
5	León	38	8	15	15	32	65	−33	31	

=== Group 3 ===
Pos	Team	Pld	W	D	L	GF	GA	GD	Pts	Qualification or relegation
1	Tecos	38	19	13	6	70	49	+21	51	Playoff
2	Zacatepec	38	17	8	13	67	54	+13	42	Playoff
3	Atlante	38	16	9	13	58	47	+11	41	
4	Atlético Potosino	38	10	16	12	48	55	−7	36	
5	Unión de Curtidores	38	7	16	15	28	46	−18	30	Relegated

=== Group 4 ===
Pos	Team	Pld	W	D	L	GF	GA	GD	Pts	Qualification
1	UNAM	38	19	11	8	79	53	+26	49	Playoff
2	Guadalajara	38	15	13	10	53	41	+12	43	Playoff
3	UANL	38	14	9	15	52	52	0	37	
4	Tampico	38	11	12	15	57	60	−3	34	
5	Atletas Campesinos	38	12	7	19	42	46	−4	31	

== Results ==
Home \ Away	AME	ATN	ATL	ACM	ATE	APO	CRA	GDL	LEO	MTY	NEZ	PUE	TAM	TOL	UDC	TEC	UNL	UDG	UNM	ZAC
América		1–2	2–1	1–1	5–0	3–1	1–2	1–0	3–1	2–3	1–1	2–2	3–2	1–1	0–0	1–0	2–0	0–1	1–1	4–0
Atlante	3–1		2–2	1–0	0–1	1–1	0–1	2–2	5–0	1–2	0–3	3–2	1–0	2–2	1–2	0–2	2–0	3–1	2–3	5–3
Atlas	3–1	0–2		0–1	1–0	1–1	0–3	0–0	0–0	1–1	1–1	0–1	1–0	1–0	2–2	0–0	1–0	0–4	2–3	1–2
Atletas Campesinos	2–0	0–1	2–1		2–1	1–1	0–0	1–1	0–0	5–0	2–0	5–0	0–2	0–1	0–1	2–2	4–3	1–0	2–0	1–3
Atlético Español	1–0	1–0	2–0	1–0		1–0	0–1	0–0	2–1	1–1	1–0	4–2	1–1	0–0	2–1	1–1	1–0	1–2	1–1	1–1
Atlético Potosino	4–4	1–0	2–1	1–2	0–0		2–1	1–0	2–3	3–2	2–2	0–0	1–1	3–1	1–0	1–1	3–2	0–0	0–1	1–1
Cruz Azul	0–0	0–2	1–1	0–1	2–4	2–2		0–0	2–0	0–0	2–1	0–1	2–1	2–0	0–0	0–1	1–1	1–0	1–1	2–0
Guadalajara	2–0	1–1	1–2	2–1	1–0	2–0	0–3		2–0	4–3	2–0	2–1	2–0	3–0	4–2	2–0	0–0	1–0	5–1	0–1
León	1–2	0–2	2–2	1–0	2–4	1–0	1–0	2–2		0–3	0–0	2–1	1–1	3–3	0–0	2–2	2–1	0–0	0–4	2–1
Monterrey	1–1	2–2	1–0	1–0	0–0	0–0	1–0	1–1	1–0		2–0	3–2	1–0	3–1	0–2	1–2	2–2	1–1	0–0	1–1
Deportivo Neza	2–0	1–0	1–0	3–1	1–1	1–3	0–0	1–1	1–1	2–1		2–0	1–0	0–0	3–2	1–2	2–1	2–0	2–3	0–0
Puebla	1–1	0–0	6–1	2–0	1–0	4–2	3–2	1–1	1–1	5–3	1–1		3–0	0–0	2–2	2–1	0–0	1–1	2–0	1–1
Tampico	2–0	2–2	1–1	1–1	2–1	1–2	0–1	4–2	1–1	2–3	2–2	3–1		2–2	2–0	2–1	2–0	1–5	4–4	3–1
Toluca	0–0	2–0	1–1	1–0	2–2	1–0	2–2	1–1	4–0	1–1	0–0	1–0	2–1		1–2	4–1	0–1	3–0	1–2	1–0
Unión de Curtidores	0–0	0–2	0–2	1–1	1–0	0–0	1–1	1–1	0–0	2–1	0–1	1–1	1–1	1–1		1–0	0–0	2–1	2–1	2–0
Tecos UAG	0–0	3–2	1–0	3–1	2–1	2–1	1–2	2–1	6–0	3–1	3–0	2–1	3–2	2–2	1–0		3–3	0–0	2–2	2–0
UANL	2–1	2–1	2–0	2–0	1–2	2–2	0–0	3–1	1–0	2–0	0–1	2–1	2–2	3–2	4–2	1–2		2–0	2–1	1–0
UDG	1–4	2–2	0–0	2–1	2–1	3–1	1–2	0–1	0–2	2–2	1–1	1–2	1–2	2–0	0–2	1–0	3–1		1–5	2–1
UNAM	2–2	0–1	1–0	3–1	1–2	2–2	2–2	5–3	0–0	2–0	2–1	3–0	1–3	2–1	4–1	5–0	3–1	4–1		2–0
Zacatepec	3–2	0–1	1–0	3–1	5–0	4–0	4–3	1–0	6–0	2–1	1–1	6–2	2–1	2–0	3–4	1–0	3–2	2–2	2–2	

Legend: Blue = home team win; Yellow = draw; Red = away team win.

== Relegation play-offs ==
July 16, 1981

Atlas	2-0	Unión de Curtidores
Sergio Lima 10' (pen.); Jorge Humberto Torres 64'	Report

Estadio Jalisco, Guadalajara
July 23, 1981

Unión de Curtidores	2-1	Atlas
José Luis Rivera 33' (pen.); Juan Carlos da Rosa 74'	Report	Sergio Lima 71'

Estadio La Martinica, León

Atlas won 2-3 on aggregate. Unión de Curtidores was relegated to Segunda División.

== Final stage ==
=== Semifinal ===
==== Group 1 ====
Pos	Team	Pld	W	D	L	GF	GA	GD	Pts	Qualification
1	Cruz Azul	6	3	2	1	5	3	+2	8	Final
2	Zacatepec	6	3	1	2	12	8	+4	7	
3	Toluca	6	2	1	3	5	7	−2	5	
4	Tecos	6	1	2	3	7	11	−4	4	

Home \ Away	CRA	TEC	TOL	ZAC
Cruz Azul		1–2	1–0	1–0
Tecos	0–0		0–0	3–4
Toluca	0–1	3–1		1–0
Zacatepec	1–1	3–1	4–1	

Source: http://www.rsssf.com/tablesm/mex81.html
Legend: Blue = home team win; Yellow = draw; Red = away team win.

==== Group 2 ====
Pos	Team	Pld	W	D	L	GF	GA	GD	Pts	Qualification
1	UNAM	6	4	1	1	12	9	+3	9	Final
2	Deportivo Neza	6	2	2	2	4	3	+1	6	
3	Guadalajara	6	2	1	3	7	9	−2	5	
4	Atlético Español	6	1	2	3	6	8	−2	4	

Source: http://www.rsssf.com/tablesm/mex81.html

Home \ Away	ATE	GDL	NEZ	UNM
Atlético Español		2–0	0–0	1–1
Guadalajara	2–1		0–0	2–3
Deportivo Neza	2–0	1–0		1–2
UNAM	3–2	2–3	1–0	

Source: http://www.rsssf.com/tablesm/mex81.html
Legend: Blue = home team win; Yellow = draw; Red = away team win.

== Final ==
August 6, 1981

Cruz Azul	1-0	UNAM
Adrián Camacho 47'	Report

Estadio Azteca, Mexico City
August 9, 1981

UNAM	4-1	Cruz Azul
Hugo Sánchez 10'; Ricardo Ferretti 22'; Manuel Manzo 24'; Enrique López Zarza	Report	Rafael Toribio

Estadio Olimpico Universitario, Mexico City

UNAM won 4-2 on aggregate.

1980-81 winners
