= Regino Delgado =

Cuban footballer (1956–2016)

Personal information
- Full name: Regino Delgado Robau
- Date of birth: 7 September 1956
- Place of birth: Santo Domingo, Cuba
- Date of death: 2 February 2016 (aged 59)

International career
| Years | Team | Apps | (Gls) |
| 1975-1988 | Cuba | 36 | (2) |

Regino Delgado Robau (7 September 1956 – 2 February 2016) was a Cuban footballer. He competed at the 1976 Summer Olympics and the 1980 Summer Olympics. Delgado was a member of the silver medal winning squad at the 1979 Pan American Games.
