= Rómulo Méndez =

Guatemalan football referee (1938–2022)

Rómulo Méndez Molina (21 December 1938 – 6 January 2022) was a Guatemalan middle-distance runner and later football referee. He was the first Guatemalan referee ever to participate in World Cup finals, refereeing one match in the 1982 World Cup and one match in the 1986 edition. Méndez was born in Cobán on 21 December 1938. He died on 6 January 2022, at the age of 83.

== International competitions (athletics) ==
Year	Competition	Venue	Position	Event	Notes
Representing Guatemala
1959	Central American and Caribbean Games	Caracas, Venezuela	–	1500 m	NT
