= Ramón Núñez (Cuban footballer) =

Cuban footballer

Personal information
- Full name: Ramón Núñez Armas
- Date of birth: 19 April 1953 (age 73)
- Place of birth: Manatí, Cuba
- Height: 1.69 m (5 ft 7 in)
- Position: Forward

Senior career*
Years	Team	Apps	(Gls)
1972–1974	Oriente Las Tunas		(19)
1975–1977	Mineros Las Tunas		(33)
1978–1987	Las Tunas		

International career
- Cuba
- * Club domestic league appearances and goals

Ramón Núñez Armas (born 19 April 1953) is a Cuban footballer. He competed in the men's tournament at the 1980 Summer Olympics.
