= Roberto Pereira =

Cuban footballer (born 1952)

Personal information
- Full name: Roberto Pereira Hernández
- Date of birth: 23 September 1952 (age 74)
- Place of birth: Santo Domingo, Cuba
- Height: 1.89 m (6 ft 2 in)
- Position: Forward

Senior career*
| Years | Team | Apps | (Gls) |
| 1970–1977 | Azucareros | | |
| 1978–1986 | Villa Clara | | |

International career
- Cuba
- * Club domestic league appearances and goals

Roberto Pereira (born 23 September 1952) is a Cuban footballer. He competed at the 1976 Summer Olympics and the 1980 Summer Olympics.
