= Andrés Roldán =

Cuban footballer

Personal information
- Full name: Andrés Faustino Roldán Cordero
- Date of birth: 28 February 1950 (age 76)
- Place of birth: Reina, Cuba
- Height: 1.67 m (5 ft 6 in)
- Position: Midfielder

Senior career*
Years	Team	Apps	(Gls)
1969–1977	Azucareros		
1978–1990	Cienfuegos		

International career
1971–1981	Cuba	35	(3)
- * Club domestic league appearances and goals

Andrés Faustino Roldán Cordero (born 28 February 1950) is a Cuban former footballer who competed in the 1976 Summer Olympics and in the 1980 Summer Olympics.

== Club career ==
Born in Cienfuegos Province, he played for Azucareros and Cienfuegos, where he retired in 1990.

== International career ==
He made his international debut for Cuba in 1971 and has earned a total of 35 caps, scoring 3 goals. He represented his country in 12 FIFA World Cup qualification matches.
