= Brazil at the 1970 FIFA World Cup =

Matches of the Brazil national football team in the 1970 FIFA World Cup

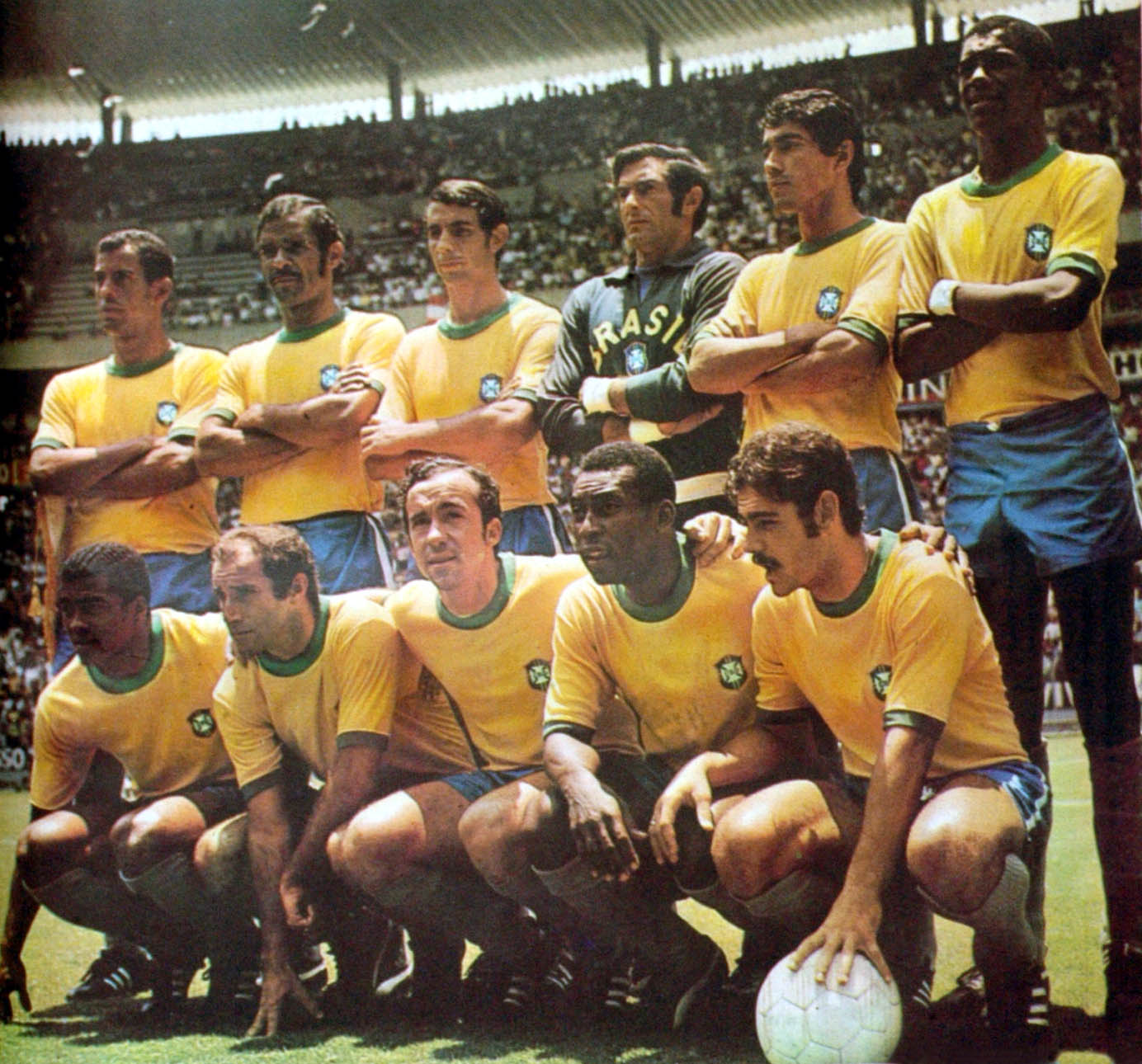
Brazil team, before the match against Peru in the quarter-final

At the 1970 FIFA World Cup, Brazil participated for the 9th time in the event. The country remained as the only national team to have participated in every installment of the FIFA World Cup. The 1970 Brazil line-up is often considered to be the greatest football team in history.

The Brazilian front five of Jairzinho, Pelé, Gérson, Tostão and Rivellino were all Number 10s in their own right and together they created an irresistible attacking momentum, with Pelé having central role in Brazil's way to the final, playing a part in 14 of Brazil's 19 goals in the tournament. In the first match, against Czechoslovakia, Pelé gave Brazil a 2–1 lead, by controlling Gerson's long pass with his chest and then scoring. In this match Pelé audaciously attempted to lob goalkeeper Ivo Viktor from the half-way line, only narrowly missing the Czechoslovak goal. Brazil went on to win the match, 4–1. In the first half of the match against England, Pelé nearly scored with a header that was spectacularly saved by Gordon Banks. In the second half, he assisted Jairzinho for the only goal of the match. Against Romania, Pelé opened the score on a direct free kick goal, a strong strike with the outside of his right foot. Later on in the match he scored again to take the score to 3–1. Brazil won by a final score of 3–2. In the quarter-finals against Peru, Brazil won 4–2, with Pelé assisting Tostão for Brazil's third goal. In the semi-finals, Brazil faced Uruguay for the first time since the 1950 World Cup final round match. Jairzinho put Brazil ahead 2–1, and Pelé assisted Rivellino for the 3–1. During that match, Pelé made one of his most famous plays. Tostão gave Pelé a through ball, and Uruguay's goalkeeper Ladislao Mazurkiewicz took notice of it. The keeper ran off of his line to get the ball before Pelé, but Pelé got there first and fooled the keeper by not touching the ball, causing it to roll to the keeper's left, while Pelé went right. Pelé went around the goalkeeper and took a shot while turning towards the goal, but he turned in excess as he shot, and the ball drifted just wide of the far post.

Brazil played Italy in the final, with Pelé scoring the opener, with a header over Italian defender Tarcisio Burgnich. He then made assists on Jairzinho's and Carlos Alberto's goals, the latter one coming after an impressive collective play. Brazil won the match 4–1, keeping the Jules Rimet Trophy indefinitely, and Pelé was named player of the tournament. Burgnich, who marked Pelé during the final, was quoted saying "I told myself before the game, he's made of skin and bones just like everyone else — but I was wrong".

Brazil were given the Jules Rimet Trophy for keeps after winning in 1970. Housed in the Brazilian Football Association's Rio de Janeiro headquarters, the cup was stolen in 1983. It is thought the thieves melted it down for its more-than 3 kg of solid gold for the resell in the black market.

== Squad ==
Head coach: Mário Zagallo

No.	Pos.	Player	Date of birth (age)	Caps	Club
1	GK	Félix	24 December 1937 (aged 32)	23	(Brazil) Fluminense
2	DF	Brito	9 August 1939 (aged 30)	28	(Brazil) Flamengo
3	DF	Piazza	25 February 1944 (aged 26)	16	(Brazil) Cruzeiro
4	DF	Carlos Alberto (c)	17 July 1944 (aged 25)	40	(Brazil) Santos
5	MF	Clodoaldo	26 September 1949 (aged 20)	7	(Brazil) Santos
6	DF	Marco Antônio	6 February 1951 (aged 19)	7	(Brazil) Fluminense
7	FW	Jairzinho	25 December 1944 (aged 25)	45	(Brazil) Botafogo
8	MF	Gérson	11 January 1941 (aged 29)	54	(Brazil) São Paulo
9	FW	Tostão	25 January 1947 (aged 23)	36	(Brazil) Cruzeiro
10	FW	Pelé	23 October 1940 (aged 29)	81	(Brazil) Santos
11	MF	Rivellino	1 January 1946 (aged 24)	21	(Brazil) Corinthians
12	GK	Ado	4 July 1946 (aged 23)	2	(Brazil) Corinthians
13	FW	Roberto	31 July 1944 (aged 25)	9	(Brazil) Botafogo
14	DF	Baldocchi	14 March 1946 (aged 24)	1	(Brazil) Palmeiras
15	DF	Fontana	31 December 1940 (aged 29)	6	(Brazil) Cruzeiro
16	DF	Everaldo	11 September 1944 (aged 25)	8	(Brazil) Grêmio
17	DF	Joel	18 September 1946 (aged 23)	26	(Brazil) Santos
18	MF	Paulo César	16 June 1949 (aged 20)	14	(Brazil) Botafogo
19	FW	Edu	6 August 1949 (aged 20)	29	(Brazil) Santos
20	FW	Dario	4 March 1946 (aged 24)	3	(Brazil) Atlético Mineiro
21	DF	Zé Maria	18 May 1949 (aged 21)	1	(Brazil) Portuguesa
22	GK	Leão	11 July 1949 (aged 20)	2	(Brazil) Palmeiras

Brazil competed in Group 3 of the 1970 FIFA World Cup in Guadalajara's Estadio Jalisco between 2 and 11 June 1970. Brazil won the group, and advanced to the quarter-finals, along with World Cup holders England. Romania and Czechoslovakia failed to advance.

	Pld	W	D	L	GF	GA	GD	Pts
Brazil	3	3	0	0	8	3	+5	6
England	3	2	0	1	2	1	+1	4
Romania	3	1	0	2	4	5	−1	2
Czechoslovakia	3	0	0	3	2	7	−5	0

== Czechoslovakia vs Brazil ==
3 June 1970
16:00

Czechoslovakia	1–4	Brazil
Petráš 11'	Report	Rivellino 24'; Pelé 59'; Jairzinho 61', 83'

Estadio Jalisco, Guadalajara
Attendance: 52,897
Referee: Ramón Barreto (Uruguay)

GK	1	Ivo Viktor
DF	2	Karol Dobiaš
DF	5	Alexander Horváth (c)	Yellow card
DF	3	Václav Migas
DF	4	Vladimír Hagara
MF	16	Ivan Hrdlička		(substituted off) 46'
MF	9	Ladislav Kuna
MF	18	František Veselý		(substituted off) 75'
MF	8	Ladislav Petráš
FW	10	Jozef Adamec
FW	11	Karol Jokl
Substitutions:
MF	6	Andrej Kvašňák		(substituted on) 46'
MF	7	Bohumil Veselý		(substituted on) 75'
Manager:
Jozef Marko

GK	1	Félix
DF	4	Carlos Alberto (c)
DF	3	Piazza
DF	2	Brito
DF	16	Everaldo
MF	5	Clodoaldo
MF	8	Gérson	Yellow card	(substituted off) 62'
MF	7	Jairzinho
FW	9	Tostão	Yellow card
FW	10	Pelé
FW	11	Rivellino
Substitutions:
MF	18	Caju		(substituted on) 62'
Manager:
Mário Zagallo

Assistant referees:
Abraham Klein (Israel)
Arturo Yamasaki (Mexico)

== England vs Brazil ==
Brazil were putting defending champions England under enormous pressure and an attack was begun by captain Carlos Alberto who sent a low ball down the right flank for the speedy Jairzinho to latch on to. The Brazilian winger sped past left-back Terry Cooper and crossed the ball into the six-yard box, where Pelé connected with a powerful header to send the ball low towards the right-hand corner of the goal. In the knowledge that his header was placed to perfection, Pelé immediately shouted "Gol!" (Portuguese for goal).

The split-second incident only allowed England goalkeeper Gordon Banks time for one conscious thought – that the shot was impossible to catch, and the only way to prevent Pelé from following up on the rebound would be to parry the ball over the bar. The ball bounced two yards in front of the goal-line, and Banks managed to make contact with the ball with the fingers of his right hand, and rolled his hand slightly to angle to ball over the crossbar. He landed in the inner netting of the goal, and knew he had saved the ball after witnessing Pelé's reaction. Banks then rose to his feet to defend the corner, and broke into laughter after the following exchange:

The only goal of the game was scored by Jairzinho in the 59th minute, a powerful right footed shot from about seven yards out on the right of the penalty area after receiving a pass from Pele.

7 June 1970
12:00

England	0–1	Brazil
	Report	Jairzinho 59'

Estadio Jalisco, Guadalajara
Attendance: 66,843
Referee: Abraham Klein (Israel)

GK	1	Gordon Banks
DF	14	Tommy Wright
DF	5	Brian Labone
DF	6	Bobby Moore (c)
DF	3	Terry Cooper
MF	4	Alan Mullery
MF	8	Alan Ball
MF	9	Bobby Charlton		(substituted off) 63'
MF	11	Martin Peters
FW	10	Geoff Hurst
FW	7	Francis Lee	Yellow card	(substituted off) 63'
Substitutions:
MF	19	Colin Bell		(substituted on) 63'
FW	22	Jeff Astle		(substituted on) 63'
Manager:
Alf Ramsey

GK	1	Félix
DF	4	Carlos Alberto (c)
DF	3	Piazza
DF	2	Brito
DF	16	Everaldo
MF	5	Clodoaldo
MF	18	Caju
MF	7	Jairzinho
FW	9	Tostão	(substituted off) 68'
FW	10	Pelé
FW	11	Rivellino
Substitutions:
FW	13	Roberto	(substituted on) 68'
Manager:
Mário Zagallo

Assistant referees:
Arturo Yamasaki (Mexico)
Roger Machin (France)

== Romania vs Brazil ==
10 June 1970
16:00

Romania	2–3	Brazil
Dumitrache 34'; Dembrovschi 84'	Report	Pelé 19', 67'; Jairzinho 22'

Estadio Jalisco, Guadalajara
Attendance: 50,804
Referee: Ferdinand Marschall (Austria)

GK	21	Stere Adamache		(substituted off) 27'
DF	2	Lajos Sătmăreanu
DF	3	Nicolae Lupescu
DF	5	Cornel Dinu
DF	4	Mihai Mocanu	Yellow card
MF	15	Ion Dumitru	Yellow card
MF	10	Radu Nunweiller
MF	7	Emerich Dembrovschi
MF	16	Alexandru Neagu
FW	9	Florea Dumitrache		(substituted off) 72'
FW	11	Mircea Lucescu (c)
Substitutions:
GK	1	Necula Răducanu		(substituted on) 27'
FW	17	Gheorghe Tătaru		(substituted on) 72'
Manager:
Angelo Niculescu

GK	1	Félix
DF	4	Carlos Alberto (c)
DF	3	Piazza
DF	2	Brito
DF	16	Everaldo	(substituted off) 60'
DF	15	Fontana
MF	5	Clodoaldo	(substituted off) 74'
MF	18	Caju
FW	7	Jairzinho
FW	9	Tostão
FW	10	Pelé
Substitutions:
DF	6	Marco Antônio	(substituted on) 60'
FW	19	Edu	(substituted on) 74'
Manager:
Mário Zagallo

Assistant referees:
Ramón Barreto (Uruguay)
Vital Loraux (Belgium)

== Quarter-Final Brazil vs Peru ==
14 June 1970
12:00

Brazil	4–2	Peru
Rivellino 11'; Tostão 15', 52'; Jairzinho 75'	Report	Gallardo 28'; Cubillas 70'

Estadio Jalisco, Guadalajara
Attendance: 54,233
Referee: Vital Loraux (Belgium)

GK	1	Félix
DF	4	Carlos Alberto (c)
DF	3	Piazza
DF	2	Brito
DF	6	Marco Antônio
MF	5	Clodoaldo
MF	8	Gérson
FW	7	Jairzinho	(substituted off) 80'
FW	9	Tostão	(substituted off) 67'
FW	10	Pelé
MF	11	Rivellino
Substitutions:
FW	13	Roberto	(substituted on) 67'
MF	18	Caju	(substituted on) 80'
Manager:
Mário Zagallo

GK	1	Luis Rubiños
DF	2	Eloy Campos
DF	14	José Fernández
DF	4	Héctor Chumpitaz (c)
DF	5	Nicolás Fuentes
MF	6	Ramón Mifflin
MF	7	Roberto Challe
FW	8	Julio Baylón	(substituted off) 54'
FW	9	Pedro Pablo León	(substituted off) 61'
FW	10	Teófilo Cubillas
FW	11	Alberto Gallardo
Substitutions:
DF	19	Eladio Reyes	(substituted on) 61'
FW	20	Hugo Sotil	(substituted on) 54'
Manager:
(Brazil) Didi

Assistant referees:
Ferdinand Marschall (Austria)
Gyula Emsberger (Hungary)

== Semi-final Uruguay vs Brazil ==
Luis Cubilla opened the scoring for Uruguay in the 19th minute when he hit a right footed shot from the right of the six yard box that went past the goalkeeper and just inside the back post. Clodoaldo equalised for Brazil just before half time when he received the ball on the left side of the penalty area from a cross from the right and shot right footed past to the right of the net. Pelé made one of his most famous plays. Tostão then gave Pelé a through ball, and Uruguay's goalkeeper Ladislao Mazurkiewicz took notice of it. The keeper ran off of his line to get the ball before Pelé, but Pelé got there first and fooled the keeper by not touching the ball, causing it to roll to the keeper's left, while Pelé went right. Pelé went around the goalkeeper and took a shot while turning towards the goal, but he turned in excess as he shot, and the ball drifted just wide of the far post. Jairzinho got the second goal for Brazil in the 76th minute, after receiving the ball he made a run past the defender and into the penalty box before shooting a low right footed shot into the net. The third goal for Brazil was scored by Rivellino in the 89th minute, a powerful low left footed shot from the edge of the penalty area into the right corner of the net.

17 June 1970
16:00

Uruguay	1–3	Brazil
Cubilla 19'	Report	Clodoaldo 44'; Jairzinho 76'; Rivellino 89'

Estadio Jalisco, Guadalajara
Attendance: 51,261
Referee: José María Ortiz de Mendibil (Spain)

GK	1	Ladislao Mazurkiewicz
DF	4	Luis Ubiña (c)
DF	2	Atilio Ancheta
DF	3	Roberto Matosas
DF	6	Juan Mujica	Yellow card
MF	10	Ildo Maneiro	Yellow card	(substituted off) 77'
MF	20	Julio César Cortés
MF	5	Julio Montero Castillo
MF	7	Luis Cubilla
FW	15	Dagoberto Fontes	Yellow card
FW	11	Julio Morales
Substitutions:
FW	9	Víctor Espárrago		(substituted on) 77'
Manager:
Juan Hohberg

GK	1	Félix
DF	4	Carlos Alberto (c)	Yellow card
DF	3	Piazza
DF	2	Brito
DF	16	Everaldo
MF	5	Clodoaldo
MF	8	Gérson
MF	7	Jairzinho
FW	9	Tostão
FW	10	Pelé
FW	11	Rivellino
Manager:
Mário Zagallo

Assistant referees:
Ferdinand Marschall (Austria)
Tofiq Bahramov (Soviet Union)

== Final ==
The 1970 FIFA World Cup Final was contested by Brazil and Italy on 21 June 1970 in the Estadio Azteca in Mexico, to determine the winner of the 1970 FIFA World Cup. This final marked the first time that two former world champions met in a final; Italy had previously won the World Cup in 1934 and 1938, while Brazil won in 1958 and 1962.

Brazil struck first, with Pelé heading in a cross by Rivellino at the 18th minute. Roberto Boninsegna equalized for Italy after a blunder in the Brazilian defence. In the second half, Brazil's firepower and creativity was too much for an Italian side that clung to their cautious defensive system. Gérson fired in a powerful shot for the second goal, and then helped provide the third, with a long free kick to Pelé who headed down into the path of the onrushing Jairzinho. Pelé capped his superb performance by drawing the Italian defence in the centre and feeding captain Carlos Alberto on the right flank for the final score. Carlos Alberto's goal, after a series of moves by the Brazilian team from the left to the centre, is considered one of the greatest goals ever scored in the history of the tournament.

A total of 8 outfield players from Brazil passed the ball until Captain Carlos Alberto hammered the ball into the corner of the Italian goal following an inch perfect pass across the Italian 18 yard box from Pelé, prompted by the intelligent Tostão, who, with his back to the goal, told Pelé that Alberto was steaming in on the right flank. Tostão started the move 5 yards from the left of the Brazilian 18 yard box, then ran the length of the field to the Italian box without touching the ball again to tell Pelé to lay it off for Alberto. The players involved in the passes in order were Tostão, Brito, Clodoaldo, Pelé, Gérson, defender Clodoaldo beat 4 Italian players in his own half before passing to Rivellino who hit a perfect pass down the wing to Jairzinho. Jairzinho crossed from the wing to the centre of the box to Pelé who held the ball up to play a pass for Alberto to smash it home. The only outfield players not involved in the move were Everaldo and Piazza. The full team was Carlos Alberto, Felix, Piazza, Brito, Clodoaldo, Everaldo Antonio, Jairzinho, Gérson, Tostão, Pelé and Rivellino. Brazil won the World Cup with 19 goals scored by 7 players, all of whom featured in the Carlos Alberto goal. Before the finals in Mexico, Brazil had to play the qualifying rounds against Colombia, Venezuela and Paraguay. Brazil was far superior winning all 6 games, scoring 23 goals and conceding only 2. In the last match of the qualifying rounds Brazil beat Paraguay 1 – 0 and had the largest official audience ever recorded for a football match, with 183,341 spectators in Brazil's Maracanã Stadium. In total the Brazilian team won all 12 games, scoring 42 goals and conceding only 8.

With this third win after their 1958 and 1962 World Cup victories, Brazil became the world's most successful national football team at that time, surpassing both Italy and Uruguay, who each had two championships. Brazil also earned the right to retain the Jules Rimet Trophy permanently. (However, it was stolen in 1983 while on display in Rio de Janeiro and never recovered.) Brazilian coach Mário Zagallo was the first footballer to become World Cup champion as a player (1958, 1962) and a coach, and Pelé ended his World Cup playing career as the first (and so far only) three-time winner.

21 June 1970
12:00

Brazil	4–1	Italy
Pelé 18'; Gérson 66'; Jairzinho 71'; Carlos Alberto 86'	Report	Boninsegna 37'

Estadio Azteca, Mexico City
Attendance: 107,412
Referee: Rudi Glöckner (East Germany)

GK	1	Félix
DF	4	Carlos Alberto (c)
DF	2	Brito
DF	3	Piazza
DF	16	Everaldo
MF	5	Clodoaldo
MF	8	Gérson
MF	7	Jairzinho
FW	9	Tostão
FW	10	Pelé
FW	11	Rivellino	Yellow card
Manager:
Mário Zagallo

GK	1	Enrico Albertosi
DF	2	Tarcisio Burgnich	Yellow card
DF	3	Giacinto Facchetti (c)
DF	5	Pierluigi Cera
DF	8	Roberto Rosato
MF	10	Mario Bertini		(substituted off) 75'
MF	13	Angelo Domenghini
MF	15	Sandro Mazzola
MF	16	Giancarlo De Sisti
FW	11	Luigi Riva
FW	20	Roberto Boninsegna		(substituted off) 84'
Substitutions:
MF	18	Antonio Juliano		(substituted on) 75'
MF	14	Gianni Rivera		(substituted on) 84'
Manager:
Ferruccio Valcareggi

Assistant referees:
Rudolf Scheurer (Switzerland)
Ángel Norberto Coerezza (Argentina)
