= 1970 FIFA World Cup Group 3 =

Football tournament group stage

Group 3 of the 1970 FIFA World Cup was contested in Guadalajara's Estadio Jalisco between 2 and 11 June 1970. Brazil won the group, and advanced to the quarter-finals, along with World Cup holders England. Romania and Czechoslovakia failed to advance.

== Standings ==
Pos	Team	Pld	W	D	L	GF	GA	GD	Pts	Qualification
1	Brazil	3	3	0	0	8	3	+5	6	Advance to knockout stage
2	England	3	2	0	1	2	1	+1	4	Advance to knockout stage
3	Romania	3	1	0	2	4	5	−1	2	
4	Czechoslovakia	3	0	0	3	2	7	−5	0	

Source: FIFA

== Matches ==
All times local (UTC−6)

=== England vs Romania ===
2 June 1970
16:00

England	1–0	Romania
Hurst 65'

Estadio Jalisco, Guadalajara
Attendance: 50,560
Referee: Vital Loraux (Belgium)

England	Romania

GK	1	Gordon Banks
RB	2	Keith Newton	(substituted off) 51'
CB	5	Brian Labone
CB	6	Bobby Moore (c)
LB	3	Terry Cooper
DM	4	Alan Mullery
CM	8	Alan Ball
CM	9	Bobby Charlton
CM	11	Martin Peters
CF	7	Francis Lee	(substituted off) 75'
CF	10	Geoff Hurst
Substitutions:
RB	14	Tommy Wright	(substituted on) 51'
CF	20	Peter Osgood	(substituted on) 75'
Manager:
Alf Ramsey

GK	21	Stere Adamache
RB	2	Lajos Sătmăreanu
CB	3	Nicolae Lupescu
CB	5	Cornel Dinu
LB	4	Mihai Mocanu
CM	15	Ion Dumitru
CM	10	Radu Nunweiller
RW	17	Gheorghe Tătaru	(substituted off) 73'
SS	7	Emerich Dembrovschi
CF	9	Florea Dumitrache
LW	11	Mircea Lucescu (c)
Substitutions:
FW	16	Alexandru Neagu	(substituted on) 73'
Manager:
Angelo Niculescu

Assistant referees:
Roger Machin (France)
Diego De Leo (Italy)

=== Brazil vs Czechoslovakia ===
3 June 1970
16:00

Brazil	4–1	Czechoslovakia
Rivellino 24'; Pelé 59'; Jairzinho 61', 83'		Petráš 11'

Estadio Jalisco, Guadalajara
Attendance: 52,897
Referee: Ramón Barreto (Uruguay)

Brazil	Czechoslovakia

GK	1	Félix
RB	4	Carlos Alberto (c)
CB	2	Brito
CB	3	Piazza
LB	16	Everaldo
CM	5	Clodoaldo
CM	8	Gérson	(yellow card) 31'	(substituted off) 62'
RW	7	Jairzinho
LW	11	Rivellino
SS	10	Pelé
CF	9	Tostão	(yellow card) 10'
Substitutions:
LW	18	Caju		(substituted on) 62'
Manager:
Mário Zagallo

GK	1	Ivo Viktor
RB	2	Karol Dobiaš
CB	5	Alexander Horváth (c)	(yellow card) 10'
CB	3	Václav Migas
LB	4	Vladimír Hagara
CM	16	Ivan Hrdlička		(substituted off) 46'
RCM	9	Ladislav Kuna
LCM	18	František Veselý		(substituted off) 75'
CM	8	Ladislav Petráš
SS	10	Jozef Adamec
CF	11	Karol Jokl
Substitutions:
MF	6	Andrej Kvašňák		(substituted on) 46'
MF	7	Bohumil Veselý		(substituted on) 75'
Manager:
Jozef Marko

Assistant referees:
Abraham Klein (Israel)
Arturo Yamasaki (Mexico)

=== Romania vs Czechoslovakia ===
6 June 1970
16:00

Romania	2–1	Czechoslovakia
Neagu 52'; Dumitrache 75' (pen.)		Petráš 5'

Estadio Jalisco, Guadalajara
Attendance: 56,818
Referee: Diego De Leo (Mexico)

Romania	Czechoslovakia

GK	21	Stere Adamache
RB	2	Lajos Sătmăreanu
CB	3	Nicolae Lupescu
CB	5	Cornel Dinu
LB	4	Mihai Mocanu
CM	15	Ion Dumitru		(substituted off) 81'
CM	10	Radu Nunweiller	(yellow card) 82'
RW	16	Alexandru Neagu
SS	7	Emerich Dembrovschi
CF	9	Florea Dumitrache
LW	11	Mircea Lucescu (c)		(substituted off) 69'
Substitutions:
MF	14	Vasile Gergely		(substituted on) 81'
FW	17	Gheorghe Tătaru		(substituted on) 69'
Manager:
Angelo Niculescu

GK	22	Alexander Vencel
RB	2	Karol Dobiaš
CB	3	Václav Migas
CB	5	Alexander Horváth (c)
LB	15	Ján Zlocha
CM	7	Bohumil Veselý
CM	6	Andrej Kvašňák	(yellow card) 82'
CM	9	Ladislav Kuna
RF	8	Ladislav Petráš
CF	19	Josef Jurkanin		(substituted off) 46'
LF	11	Karol Jokl		(substituted off) 69'
Substitutions:
FW	10	Jozef Adamec		(substituted on) 46'
FW	18	František Veselý		(substituted on) 69'
Manager:
Jozef Marko

Assistant referees:
Gyula Emsberger (Hungary)
Vital Loraux (Belgium)

=== Brazil vs England ===
7 June 1970
12:00

Brazil	1–0	England
Jairzinho 59'

Estadio Jalisco, Guadalajara
Attendance: 66,843
Referee: Abraham Klein (Israel)

Brazil	England

GK	1	Félix
RB	4	Carlos Alberto (c)
CB	2	Brito
CB	3	Piazza
LB	16	Everaldo
CM	5	Clodoaldo
CM	11	Rivellino
RW	7	Jairzinho
LW	18	Caju
SS	10	Pelé
CF	9	Tostão	(substituted off) 68'
Substitutions:
CF	13	Roberto	(substituted on) 68'
Manager:
Mário Zagallo

GK	1	Gordon Banks
RB	14	Tommy Wright
CB	5	Brian Labone
CB	6	Bobby Moore (c)
LB	3	Terry Cooper
DM	4	Alan Mullery
CM	8	Alan Ball
CM	9	Bobby Charlton		(substituted off) 63'
CM	11	Martin Peters
CF	7	Francis Lee	(yellow card) 30'	(substituted off) 63'
CF	10	Geoff Hurst
Substitutions:
CM	19	Colin Bell		(substituted on) 63'
CF	22	Jeff Astle		(substituted on) 63'
Manager:
Alf Ramsey

Assistant referees:
Arturo Yamasaki (Mexico)
Roger Machin (France)

=== Brazil vs Romania ===
10 June 1970
16:00

Brazil	3–2	Romania
Pelé 19', 67'; Jairzinho 22'		Dumitrache 34'; Dembrovschi 84'

Estadio Jalisco, Guadalajara
Attendance: 50,804
Referee: Ferdinand Marschall (Austria)

Brazil	Romania

GK	1	Félix
RB	4	Carlos Alberto (c)
CB	2	Brito
CB	15	Fontana
LB	16	Everaldo	(substituted off) 60'
CM	3	Piazza
CM	5	Clodoaldo	(substituted off) 74'
RW	7	Jairzinho
LW	18	Caju
SS	10	Pelé
CF	9	Tostão
Substitutions:
LB	6	Marco Antônio	(substituted on) 60'
LW	19	Edu	(substituted on) 74'
Manager:
Mário Zagallo

GK	21	Stere Adamache		(substituted off) 27'
RB	2	Lajos Sătmăreanu
CB	3	Nicolae Lupescu
CB	5	Cornel Dinu
LB	4	Mihai Mocanu	(yellow card) 78'
CM	15	Ion Dumitru	(yellow card) 44'
CM	10	Radu Nunweiller
RW	16	Alexandru Neagu
SS	7	Emerich Dembrovschi
CF	9	Florea Dumitrache		(substituted off) 72'
LW	11	Mircea Lucescu (c)
Substitutions:
GK	1	Necula Răducanu		(substituted on) 27'
FW	17	Gheorghe Tătaru		(substituted on) 72'
Manager:
Angelo Niculescu

Assistant referees:
Ramón Barreto (Uruguay)
Vital Loraux (Belgium)

=== England vs Czechoslovakia ===
11 June 1970
16:00

England	1–0	Czechoslovakia
Clarke 50' (pen.)

Estadio Jalisco, Guadalajara
Attendance: 49,292
Referee: Roger Machin (France)

England	Czechoslovakia

GK	1	Gordon Banks
RB	2	Keith Newton
CB	17	Jack Charlton
CB	6	Bobby Moore (c)
LB	3	Terry Cooper
DM	4	Alan Mullery
CM	19	Colin Bell
CM	9	Bobby Charlton	(substituted off) 65'
CM	11	Martin Peters
CF	21	Allan Clarke
CF	22	Jeff Astle	(substituted off) 65'
Substitutions:
CM	8	Alan Ball	(substituted on) 65'
CF	20	Peter Osgood	(substituted on) 65'
Manager:
Alf Ramsey

GK	1	Ivo Viktor (c)
DF	2	Karol Dobiaš	(yellow card) 78'
DF	3	Václav Migas
DF	14	Vladimír Hrivnák
DF	4	Vladimír Hagara
MF	17	Jaroslav Pollák
MF	9	Ladislav Kuna
MF	18	František Veselý
MF	8	Ladislav Petráš
FW	10	Jozef Adamec
FW	21	Ján Čapkovič		(substituted off) 72'
Substitutions:
FW	11	Karol Jokl		(substituted on) 72'
Manager:
Jozef Marko

Assistant referees:
Gyula Emsberger (Hungary)
Ferdinand Marschall (Austria)

== See also ==
- Brazil at the FIFA World Cup
- Czech Republic at the FIFA World Cup
- England at the FIFA World Cup
- Romania at the FIFA World Cup
- Slovakia at the FIFA World Cup
