= 1970 FIFA World Cup final =

World Cup final, held in Mexico

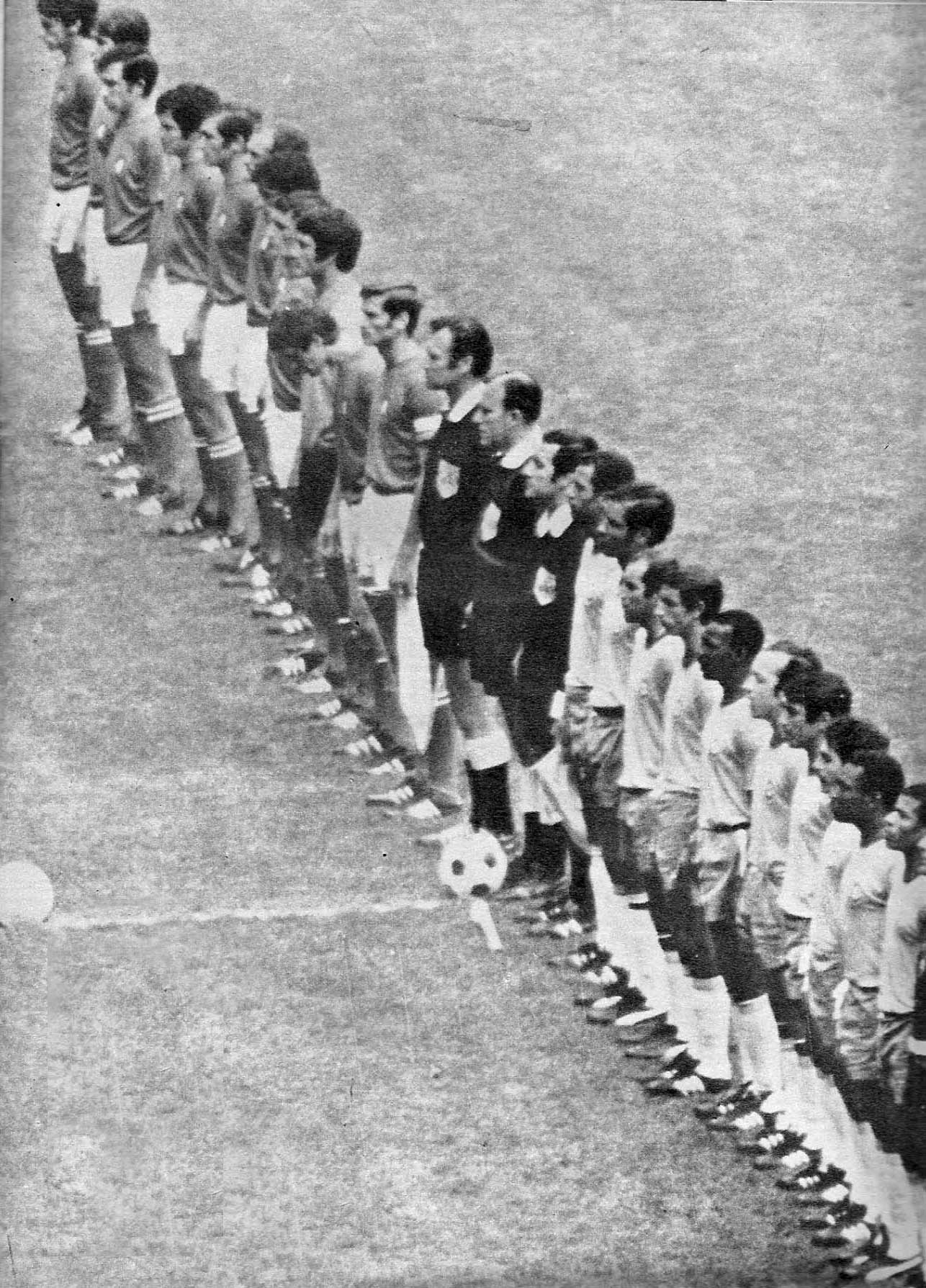
- Both teams lining up before the match
- Event: 1970 FIFA World Cup
Brazil	Italy
4	1
- Date: 21 June 1970
- Venue: Estadio Azteca, Mexico City
- Referee: Rudi Glöckner (East Germany)
- Attendance: 107,412

The final match of the 1970 FIFA World Cup, the ninth edition of FIFA's competition for national football teams, was played at Estadio Azteca in Mexico City, Mexico, on 21 June 1970, and was contested by Brazil and Italy.

The tournament comprised hosts Mexico, defending champions England, and 14 other teams who emerged from the qualification phase, organized by the six FIFA confederations. The 16 teams competed in a group stage, from which 8 teams qualified for the knockout stage. En route to the final, Brazil finished atop Group 3, with three wins, before defeating Peru in the quarter-final and Uruguay in the semi-final. Italy finished first in Group 2, with one win and two draws, after which they defeated Mexico in the quarter-final and West Germany in the semi-final.

== Background ==
The 1970 FIFA World Cup was the ninth edition of the World Cup, FIFA's football competition for national teams, held in Mexico between 31 May and 21 June 1970. Mexico and England qualified automatically for the finals — Mexico as hosts and England as winners of the previous World Cup. The remaining 14 spots were decided through qualifying rounds held between November 1968 and December 1969, organized by the six FIFA confederations. In the finals, the team were divided into four groups of four with each other playing each other once in a round-robin format. The two top teams from each group advanced to a knock-out phase. Holders England were eliminated in the quarter-finals in 1970.

Brazil and Italy had previously met four times; their first encounter was in the semi-finals of the 1938 tournament, which Italy won 2–1. The most recent meeting between the two teams before the 1970 World Cup was at a friendly match at the San Siro on 12 May 1963, which Italy won 3–0.

== Route to the final ==
=== Brazil ===
Brazil qualified for the tournament as Group 2 winners in the South American qualifiers. They were drawn into Group 3 for the World Cup, in which they were joined by England, Romania, and Czechoslovakia. Their first group game was against Czechoslovakia at Estadio Jalisco in Guadalajara on 3 June. Ladislav Petráš opened the scoring for Czechoslovakia in the eleventh minute, with Rivellino equalizing from a free kick thirteen minutes later. Pelé scored to give Brazil the lead in the second half, with Jairzinho scoring Brazil's third and fourth goals to seal a 4–1 victory for Brazil. In their second group game, Brazil played England in Guadalajara on 7 June. Jairzinho scored the only goal of the game from eight yards after receiving Pelé's pass to give Brazil a 1–0 win. Their third and final group game was against Romania in Guadalajara on 10 June. Pelé struck the first goal from a free kick in the 19th minute, with Jairzinho doubling Brazil's lead three minutes later. Florea Dumitrache pulled a goal back for Romania in the 34th minute, with the first half finishing 2–1. Pelé scored Brazil's third goal in the 65th minute, before Emerich Dembrovschi added a second for Romania six minutes before the end of regular time.

Brazil's quarter-final match was against Peru in Guadalajara on 14 June. Brazil held on to a 2–1 lead in the first half, with both Brazilian goals from Rivellino and Tostão, and one from Alberto Gallardo for Peru. Seven minutes into the second half, Tostão scored his second from a rebound of Pelé's shot to make it 3–1, before Teófilo Cubillas added Peru's second in the 69th minute. Jairzinho scored five minutes before the end of regular time to seal another Brazilian victory of 4–2. Brazil's opponents in the semi-final were Uruguay in Guadalajara on 17 June. Uruguay took the lead after eighteen minutes when Brito's mis-hit clearance fell to Julio Morales, who passed it to Luis Cubilla, who scored past goalkeeper Félix. Clodoaldo equalized for Brazil in the 44th minute, with Jairzinho scoring in the 76th minute to give Brazil the lead. With one minute remaining, Rivellino hit a left-footed drive shot following Pele's pass to secure a 3-1 victory for Brazil and progress the team to their fourth consecutive final.

=== Italy ===
Italy qualified for the tournament as Group 3 winners in the European qualifiers. They were drawn into Group 2, alongside Sweden, Uruguay, and Israel. In their first group game against Sweden at Nemesio Diez Stadium in Toluca on 3 June, Angelo Domenghini scored the only goal of the game in the first half, in which defender Comunardo Niccolai was forced off injured after a collision with striker Ove Kindvall. Their second group game against Uruguay at Estadio Cuauhtémoc in Puebla on 6 June ended in a goalless draw. Similarly, Italy's third and final group game against Israel in Toluca on 11 June finished with no scoring, despite various chances from the Italians. Nevertheless, Italy managed to qualify for the quarter-final.

Italy's opponents in the quarter-final were Mexico in Toluca on 14 June. José Luis González Dávila struck the first goal from close range in the 12th minute to give Mexico the lead, but Javier Guzmán scored an own goal halfway through the first half, allowing Italy to equalize. Gigi Riva added a third goal for Italy in the 63rd minute, followed by a goal from second-half substitute Gianni Rivera seven minutes later. Riva scored his team's fourth goal in the 76th minute to seal a 4–1 victory for Italy. In the semi-final, Italy faced West Germany at Estadio Azteca in Mexico City on 17 June. In a match dubbed by The Daily Telegraph as the "Game of the Century" in 2012, Italy won 4–3. Italy took the lead after eight minutes through Roberto Boninsegna, with Karl-Heinz Schnellinger equalizing the score before the end of regular time, forcing the match into extra time. Gerd Müller gave West Germany the lead in the 94th minute, but Tarcisio Burgnich levelled for Italy five minutes later. In the 104th minute, Italy retook the lead from a goal by Gigi Riva, before Müller added his second for West Germany a minute later, tying the score 3-3. In the 111th minute, Gianni Rivera received Roberto Rosato's pass in the penalty area and scored the winning goal.

Brazil
Round
Italy
Opponent
Result
Group stage
Opponent
Result
Czechoslovakia
4–1
Match 1
Sweden
1–0
England
1–0
Match 2
Uruguay
0–0
Romania
3–2
Match 3
Israel
0–0
Group 3 winner

Team	Pld	W	D	L	GF	GA	GD	Pts
Brazil	3	3	0	0	8	3	+5	6
England	3	2	0	1	2	1	+1	4
Romania	3	1	0	2	4	5	−1	2
Czechoslovakia	3	0	0	3	2	7	−5	0

Final group standings
Group 2 winner

Team	Pld	W	D	L	GF	GA	GD	Pts
Italy	3	1	2	0	1	0	+1	4
Uruguay	3	1	1	1	2	1	+1	3
Sweden	3	1	1	1	2	2	0	3
Israel	3	0	2	1	1	3	−2	2

Opponent
Result
Knockout stage
Opponent
Result
Peru
4–2
Quarter-finals
Mexico
4–1
Uruguay
3–1
Semi-finals
West Germany
4–3 (a.e.t.)

== Match ==
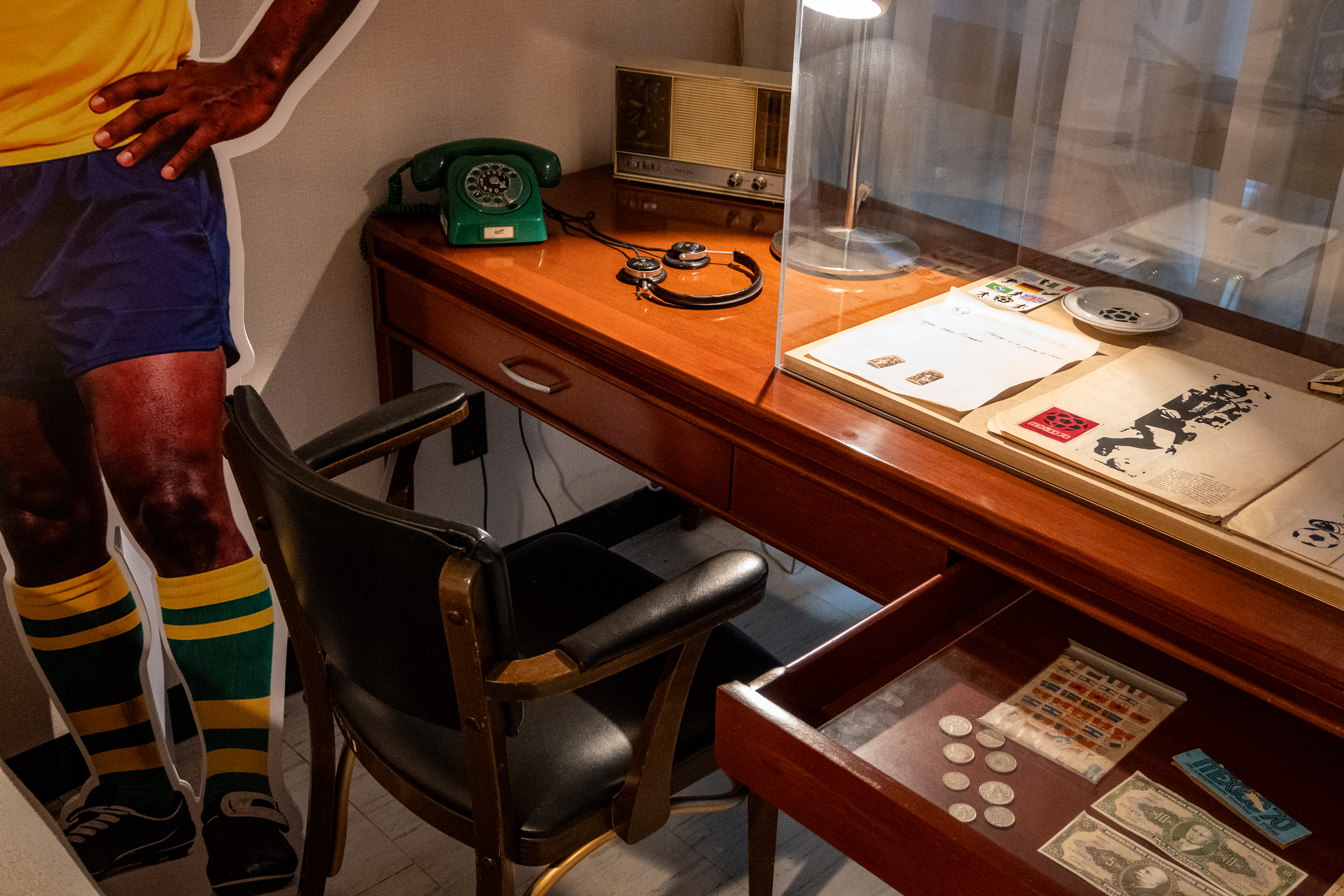
Recreation of Pelé's room at the Inter-American Social Security Conference Hotel of Mexico City, their hotel prior to their match against Italy on June 21, 1970.

=== Summary ===
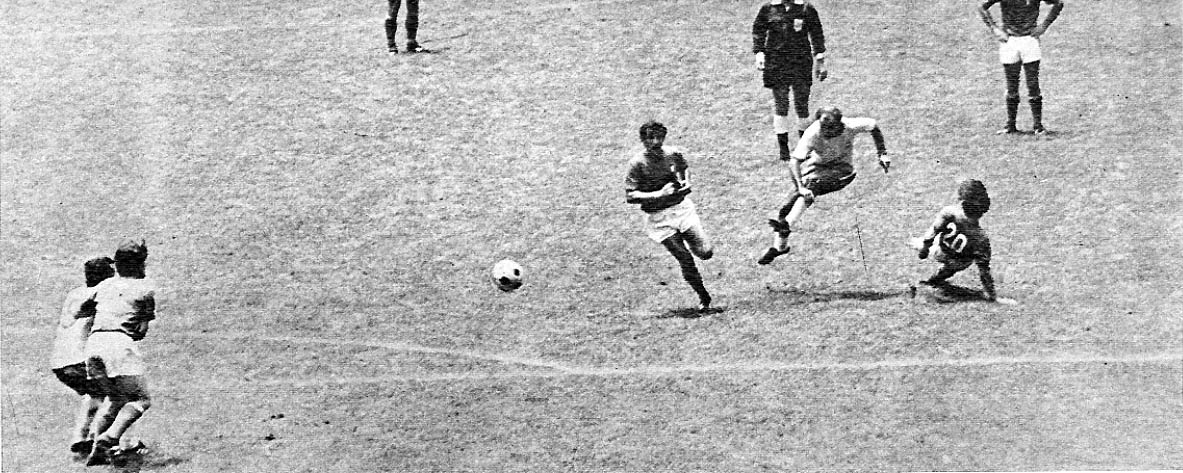
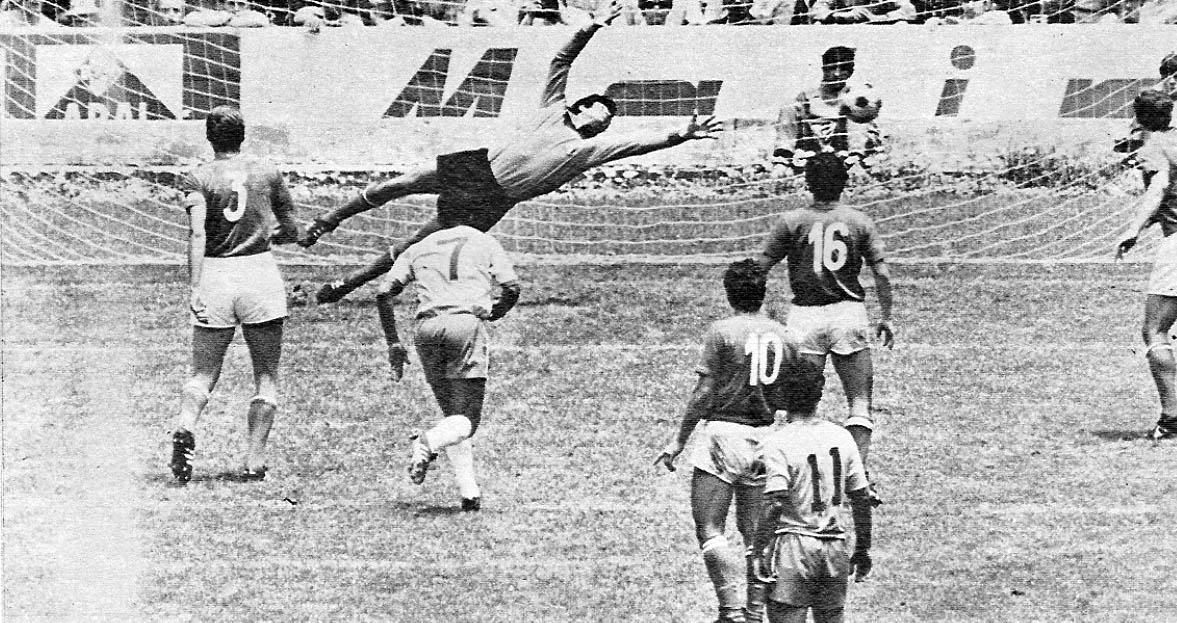
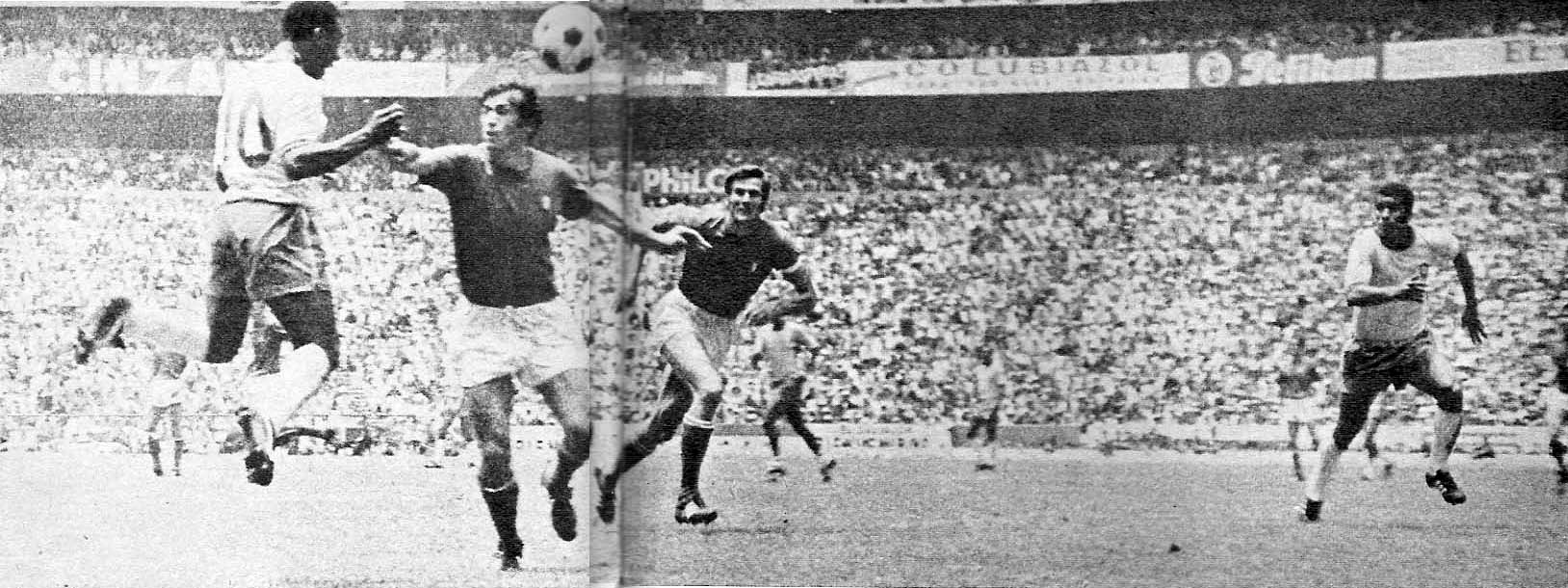
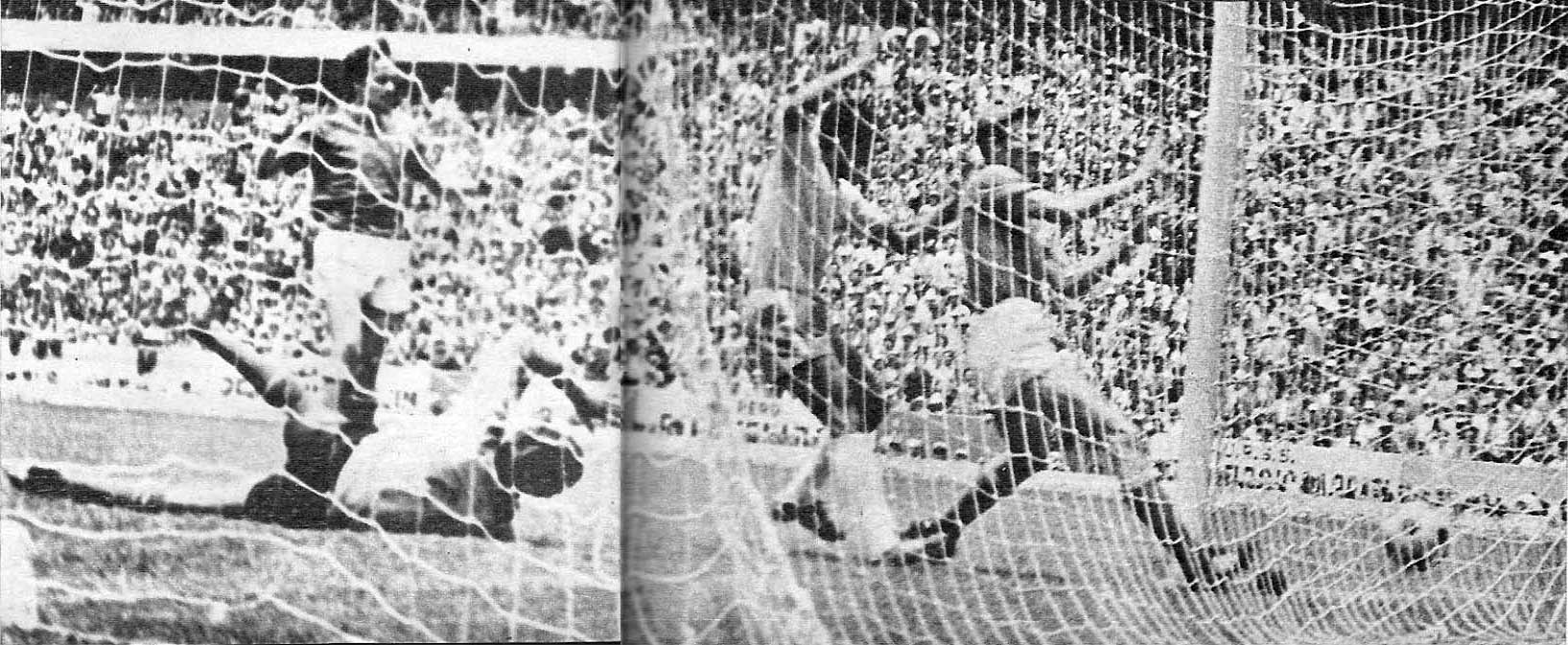
Sequences of the 2nd and 3rd Brazil goals scored by Gerson (above) and Jairzinho (below), respectively

Brazil struck first, with Pelé heading in a cross by Rivellino in the 18th minute. Roberto Boninsegna equalized for Italy after a blunder in the Brazilian defence. In the second half, Brazil's firepower and creativity was too much for an Italian side that clung to their cautious defensive system. Gérson fired in a powerful shot for the second goal, and then helped provide the third, with a long free kick to Pelé who headed down into the path of the onrushing Jairzinho.

Pelé capped his superb performance by drawing the Italian defence in the centre and feeding captain Carlos Alberto on the right flank for the final score. Carlos Alberto's goal, after a series of moves by the Brazilian team from the left to the centre, is considered one of the greatest goals ever scored in the history of the tournament.

A total of seven outfield players from Brazil passed the ball until captain Carlos Alberto hammered the ball into the corner of the Italian goal following a pass across the Italian penalty area from Pelé, prompted by Tostão, who, with his back to the goal, told Pelé that Alberto was steaming in on the right flank. Tostão started the move five yards from the left of the Brazilian penalty area, then ran the length of the field to the Italian box without touching the ball again to tell Pelé to lay it off for Alberto. The players involved in the passes in order were Tostão, Piazza, Clodoaldo, Pelé and Gérson. Clodoaldo beat four Italian players in his own half before passing to Rivellino who hit a perfect pass down the wing to Jairzinho. Jairzinho crossed from the wing to the centre of the box to Pelé who held the ball up to play a pass for Alberto to smash it home. The only outfield players not involved in the move were Everaldo and Brito, although the ball did ricochet off Everaldo's foot when he was nutmegged by Juliano in the tackle. This caused the ball to run loose for Tostao as he tracked back. In 2002, the UK public voted the goal as number 36 in the list of the 100 Greatest Sporting Moments.

=== Details ===
21 June 1970
12:00 UTC−6

Brazil	4–1	Italy
Pelé 18'; Gérson 66'; Jairzinho 71'; Carlos Alberto 86'		Boninsegna 37'

Estadio Azteca, Mexico City
Attendance: 107,412
Referee: Rudi Glöckner (East Germany)

Brazil	Italy

GK	1	Félix
RB	4	Carlos Alberto (c)
CB	2	Brito
CB	3	Piazza
LB	16	Everaldo
CM	5	Clodoaldo
CM	8	Gérson
RW	7	Jairzinho
LW	11	Rivellino	(yellow card) 45'
SS	10	Pelé
CF	9	Tostão
Substitutes:
GK	12	Ado
DF	6	Marco Antônio
FW	13	Roberto
DF	15	Fontana
FW	18	Caju
Manager:
Mário Zagallo

GK	1	Enrico Albertosi
RB	2	Tarcisio Burgnich	(yellow card) 27'
CB	8	Roberto Rosato
CB	5	Pierluigi Cera
LWB	3	Giacinto Facchetti (c)
DM	10	Mario Bertini		(substituted off) 74'
CM	16	Giancarlo De Sisti
RW	13	Angelo Domenghini
AM	15	Sandro Mazzola
CF	20	Roberto Boninsegna		(substituted off) 84'
CF	11	Gigi Riva
Substitutes:
GK	12	Dino Zoff
DF	4	Fabrizio Poletti
MF	14	Gianni Rivera		(substituted on) 84'
MF	18	Antonio Juliano		(substituted on) 74'
MF	21	Giuseppe Furino
Manager:
Ferruccio Valcareggi

Assistant referees:
Rudolf Scheurer (Switzerland)
Ángel Coerezza (Argentina)

Match rules:

- 90 minutes
- 30 minutes of extra time if necessary
- Replay on 23 June if scores still level
- Five named substitutes
- Maximum of two substitutions

== Post-match ==
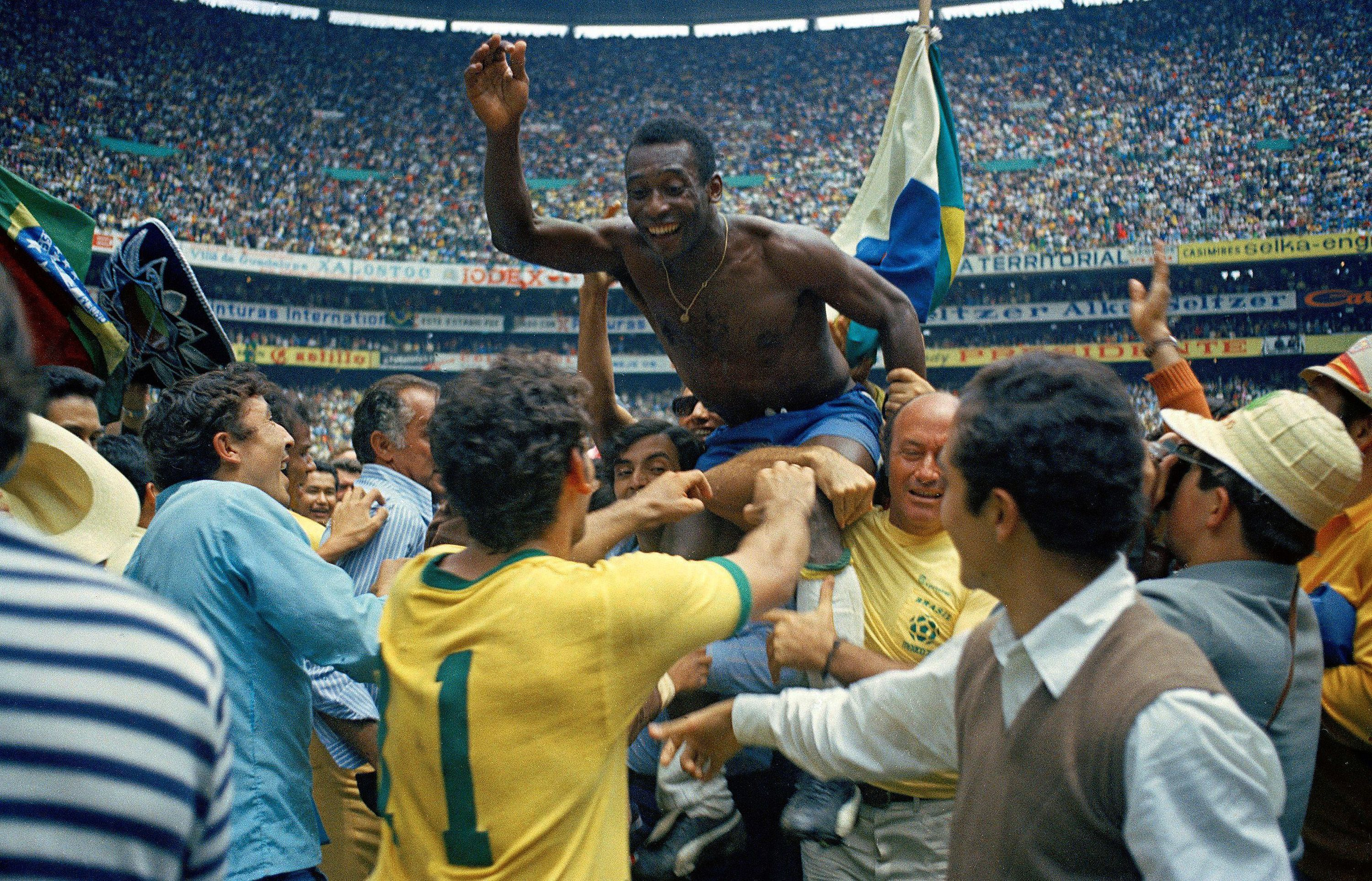
Pelé celebrating after winning the match. It was his last World Cup as he would retire from the national team one year later

With this third win after their 1958 and 1962 World Cup victories, Brazil became the world's most successful national football team at that time, surpassing both Italy and Uruguay, who each had two championships. The third title earned Brazil the right to retain the Jules Rimet Trophy permanently; it was stolen in 1983 while on display in Rio de Janeiro and never recovered.

Thirty-eight-year-old Brazilian coach Mário Zagallo became the first footballer to win the World Cup as a player (1958, 1962) and a coach, as well the second youngest coach to win a World Cup, after Alberto Suppici in 1930. Pelé ended his World Cup playing career as the competition's first (and as of 2026, only) three-time winner.

Twelve years later, the 1982 FIFA World Cup saw Italy defeat Brazil 3–2 in the match known as the "Sarrià Tragedy" (Tragédia do Sarrià).

=== Legacy ===
Historically, this 1970 Brazil squad is generally revered as the best World Cup team.

== See also ==
- 1994 FIFA World Cup final
- Brazil 70: The Third Star (Netflix miniseries)
- Brazil–Italy football rivalry
- Brazil at the FIFA World Cup
- Italy at the FIFA World Cup
