= Wilson Piazza =

Brazilian footballer

- Piazza with Brazil in 1970

Personal information
- Full name: Wilson da Silva Piazza
- Date of birth: 25 February 1943 (age 83)
- Place of birth: Ribeirão das Neves, Brazil
- Height: 1.75 m (5 ft 9 in)
- Positions: Centre back; midfielder

Youth career
- Renascença

Senior career*
Years	Team	Apps	(Gls)
1961–1963	Renascença		
1963–1979	Cruzeiro	566	(40)

International career
1967–1975	Brazil	51	(0)
Medal record
Men's Football
Representing Brazil
FIFA World Cup
Winner	1970 Mexico
- * Club domestic league appearances and goals

Wilson da Silva Piazza (Brazilian Portuguese: [ˈwiwsõ dɐ ˈsiwvɐ piˈazɐ]; born 25 February 1943 in Ribeirão das Neves), is a former Brazilian footballer. He played as a defensive midfielder or centre-back, in particular with Cruzeiro E.C. and the Brazil national team. He was a member of the Brazilian team that won the 1970 World Cup. He was a member of the Cruzeiro team which won the 1976 Copa Libertadores.

== International career ==
Piazza made 51 appearances for the Brazil national team between 1967 and 1975. He played for his nation in both the 1970 and 1974 World Cups, appearing in six games in 1970, including the 4–1 final victory over Italy.

== Honours ==
Cruzeiro E.C.

- Taça Brasil: 1966
- Copa Libertadores: 1976
- Campeonato Mineiro: 1965, 1966, 1967, 1968, 1969, 1972, 1973, 1974, 1975, 1977

=== International ===
Brazil

- FIFA World Cup: 1970

=== Individual ===
- Brazilian Silver Ball: 1972
