= Václav Migas =

Czech footballer (1944–2000)

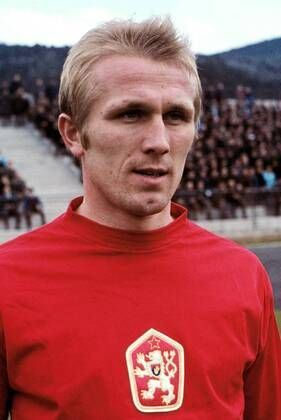
- Migas with Czechoslovakia

Personal information
- Date of birth: 16 September 1944
- Date of death: 23 September 2000 (aged 56)
- Height: 1.79 m (5 ft 10 in)
- Position: Defender

Senior career*
Years	Team	Apps	(Gls)
- Sparta Prague

International career
1969–1970	Czechoslovakia	8	(0)
- * Club domestic league appearances and goals

Václav Migas (16 September 1944 – 23 September 2000) was a Czech footballer who played as a defender for Sparta Prague. He earned eight caps for the Czechoslovakia national football team, and participated in the 1970 FIFA World Cup.
