= Bohumil Veselý =

Czech footballer

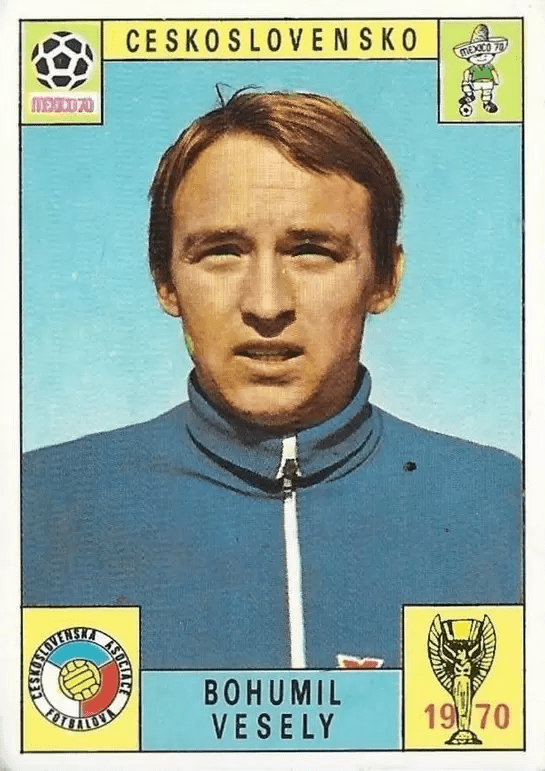
- Veselý at the 1970 FIFA World Cup

Personal information
- Full name: Bohumil Veselý
- Date of birth: 18 June 1945 (age 81)
- Place of birth: Prague, Czechoslovakia
- Position: Midfielder

International career
Years	Team	Apps	(Gls)
1967–1974	Czechoslovakia	26	(3)

Bohumil Veselý (born 18 June 1945) is a retired Czech footballer.

During his career he played for AC Sparta Prague. He earned 26 caps for the Czechoslovakia national football team, and participated in the 1970 FIFA World Cup.
