= Félix (footballer) =

Brazilian footballer (1937–2012)

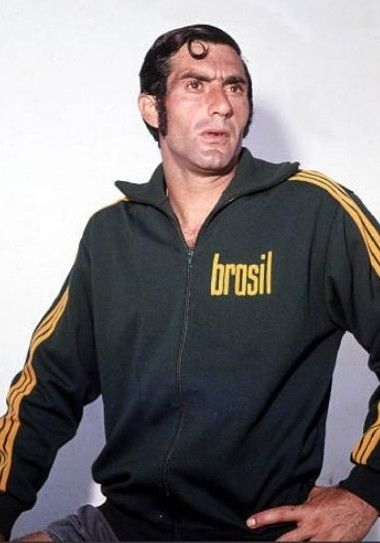
- Félix in 1970

Personal information
- Full name: Félix Miélli Venerando
- Date of birth: 24 December 1937
- Place of birth: São Paulo, Brazil
- Date of death: 24 August 2012 (aged 74)
- Place of death: São Paulo, Brazil
- Height: 1.76 m (5 ft 9 in)
- Position: Goalkeeper

Senior career*
Years	Team	Apps	(Gls)
1953–1955	Juventus		
1955–1968	Portuguesa	305	(0)
1957–1960	→ Nacional (SP) (loan)		
1968–1978	Fluminense	319	(0)

International career
1965–1972	Brazil	39	(0)

Managerial career
- 1982: Botafogo
- 1982: Avaí
Medal record
Men's Football
Representing Brazil
FIFA World Cup
Winner	1970 Mexico
- * Club domestic league appearances and goals

Félix Miélli Venerando (24 December 1937 – 24 August 2012) was a Brazilian football player, more commonly known as Félix.

Félix was born in São Paulo. He was goalkeeper for Associação Portuguesa de Desportos and Fluminense Football Club. He won 47 caps (8 non-official) with the Brazil national team, including the 1970 FIFA World Cup-winning squad.

== Honours ==
=== Club ===
Fluminense

- Campeonato Carioca: 1969, 1971, 1973, 1975, 1976
- Campeonato Brasileiro: 1970

=== International ===
Brazil

- FIFA World Cup: 1970
