= Brito (footballer, born 1939) =

Brazilian footballer (1939–2026)

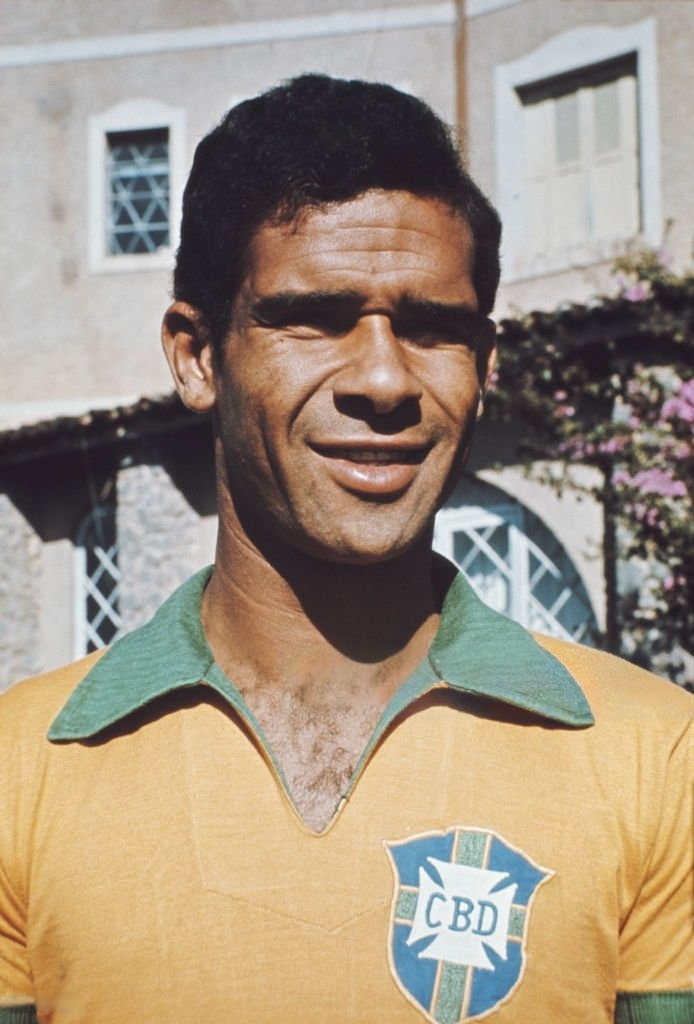
- Brito in 1965

Personal information
- Full name: Hércules de Brito Ruas
- Date of birth: 9 August 1939
- Place of birth: Rio de Janeiro, Brazil
- Date of death: 11 June 2026 (aged 86)
- Place of death: Rio de Janeiro, Brazil
- Height: 1.89 m (6 ft 2 in)
- Position: Centre-back

Youth career
- 1955–1957: Vasco da Gama

Senior career*
Years	Team	Apps	(Gls)
1957	Vasco da Gama		
1958	Internacional		
1959–1969	Vasco da Gama	405	(11)
1969–1970	Flamengo		
1970	Cruzeiro		
1971–1974	Botafogo		
1974	Corinthians		
1974	Atlético Paranaense		
1975	Montreal Castors		
1975	Deportivo Galicia		
1975–1978	Democrata-GV		
1979	Ríver		

International career
1964–1972	Brazil	45	(1)
Medal record
Men's Football
Representing Brazil
FIFA World Cup
Winner	1970 Mexico
- * Club domestic league appearances and goals

Hércules de Brito Ruas (9 August 1939 – 11 June 2026), known as Brito, was a Brazilian footballer who played as a centre-back for several clubs, and for the Brazil national team.

== Club career ==
In 1975, Brito played abroad in the National Soccer League with Montreal Castors.

== International career ==
Brito played for the Brazil national team between 1964 and 1972, winning 45 caps.

He won the 1970 FIFA World Cup with the Brazil national team. He also played the 1966 FIFA World Cup (one game against Portugal).

== Death ==
Brito died of pneumonia in Rio de Janeiro, on 11 June 2026, at the age of 86.

== Honours ==
Vasco da Gama

- Tournoi de Paris: 1957
- Teresa Herrera Trophy: 1957
- Torneio Rio–São Paulo: 1966
- Taça Guanabara: 1965
- Troféu IV Centenário do Rio: 1965
- Torneio Pentagonal do México: 1963

Brazil

- FIFA World Cup: 1970
- Roca Cup: 1971
- Brazil Independence Cup: 1972

Individual

- Placar's Bola de Prata (Silver Ball): 1970
