= Marco Antônio (footballer, born 1951) =

Brazilian footballer

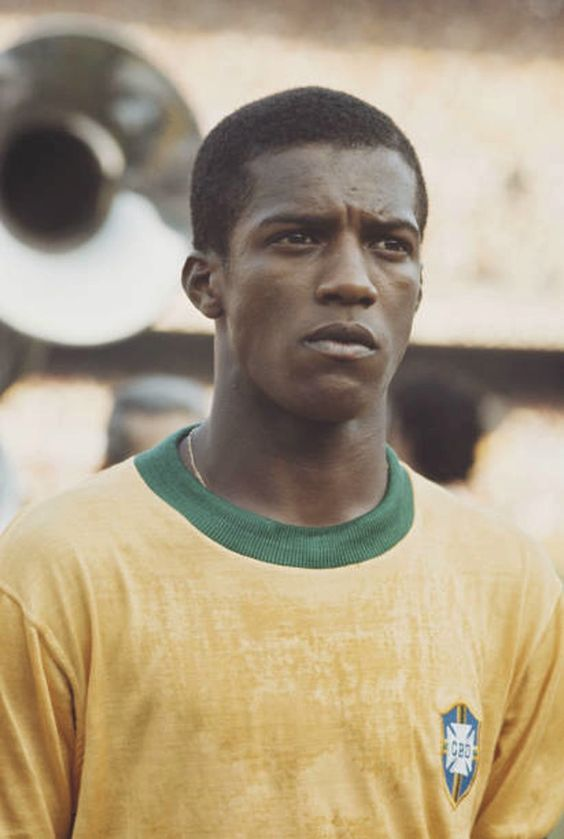
- Marco Antônio in 1970

Personal information
- Full name: Marco Antônio Feliciano
- Date of birth: February 6, 1951 (age 75)
- Place of birth: Santos, Brazil
- Height: 1.85 m (6 ft 1 in)
- Position: Left back

Senior career*
Years	Team	Apps	(Gls)
1968	Portuguesa Santista	0	(0)
1969–1976	Fluminense	330	(29)
1976–1980	Vasco da Gama	71	(2)
1981–1983	Bangu	32	(1)
1983–1984	Botafogo		

International career
1970–1979	Brazil	52	(1)
Medal record
Men's football
Representing Brazil
FIFA World Cup
Winner	1970 Mexico
Third place	1978 Argentina
CONMEBOL Copa America
Third place	1975 Copa América
Third place	1979 Copa América
- * Club domestic league appearances and goals

Marco Antônio Feliciano (born February 6, 1951), known as just Marco Antônio, is a former Brazilian footballer. He played as a left-back for Fluminense and the Brazil national team. He won the 1970 FIFA World Cup at international level, while at club level, he is a five-time winner of Campeonato Carioca (Rio de Janeiro State championship) and received the “Brazilian Silver Ball” in 1975 and 1976.

== Clubs ==
- ?-? : Fazenda (amateur club)
- 1968-1968 : Portuguesa Santista
- 1969–1976 : Fluminense
- 1976–1980 : Vasco da Gama
- 1981–1983 : Bangu
- 1983–1984 : Botafogo

At international level, he obtained 52 caps (12 non official) with the Brazil national team between 1970 and 1979, scoring one goal. \ He won the 1970 World Cup (playing two games) and also played also during the 1974 FIFA World Cup, in which Brazil finished fourth.

== Honours ==
Fluminense

- Campeonato Carioca: 1969, 1971, 1973, 1975
- Campeonato Brasileiro: 1970

Vasco da Gama

- Campeonato Carioca: 1977

Brazil

- FIFA World Cup: 1970
