= Ángel Coerezza =

Argentine football referee (1933–2026)

- Born: Ángel Norberto Coerezza; 24 October 1933; Buenos Aires, Argentina
- Died: 7 January 2026 (aged 92)

Domestic
Years	League	Role
1953–1978	Argentine Football Association	Referee

International
Years	League	Role
1970	FIFA	Referee
1976	International Olympic Committee	Referee
1978	FIFA	Referee

Ángel Norberto Coerezza (24 October 1933 – 7 January 2026) was an Argentine football referee.

Coerezza refereed matches in the FIFA World Cup in 1970 and 1978 as well as at the Summer Olympics in 1976. Domestically, he was a referee for the Argentine Football Association from 1953 to 1978.

Coerezza died on 7 January 2026, at the age of 92.
