= Fontana (footballer) =

Brazilian footballer (1940-1980)

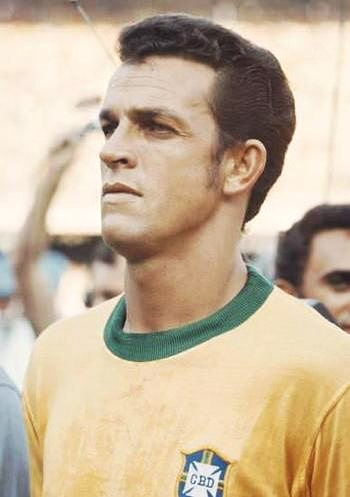
- Fontana in 1970

Personal information
- Full name: José de Anchieta Fontana
- Date of birth: 31 December 1940
- Place of birth: Santa Teresa, Brazil
- Date of death: 9 September 1980 (aged 39)
- Position: Defender

Senior career*
Years	Team	Apps	(Gls)
1959	Vitória		
1960–1962	Rio Branco		
1963–1969	Vasco	561	(11)
1969–1972	Cruzeiro		

International career
1966–1970	Brazil	7	(0)
Medal record
Men's Football
Representing Brazil
FIFA World Cup
Winner	1970 Mexico
- * Club domestic league appearances and goals

José de Anchieta Fontana (31 December 1940 – 9 September 1980), known as just Fontana was a Brazilian footballer who played as a defender.

During his club career, he played for:

- 1958 Vitoria
- 1959–1962 Rio Branco
- 1962–1968 Vasco da Gama
- 1969–1972 Cruzeiro

Fontana was a member of the Brazil national football team when they won the 1970 FIFA World Cup.

He died in his hometown, Santa Teresa, a few months short of his 40th birthday.

== Honours ==
Rio Branco

- Campeonato Capixaba: 1959, 1962

Vasco da Gama

- Torneio Rio-São Paulo: 1966

Cruzeiro

- Campeonato Mineiro: 1972

Brazil

- FIFA World Cup: 1970
