= Tostão =

Brazilian footballer

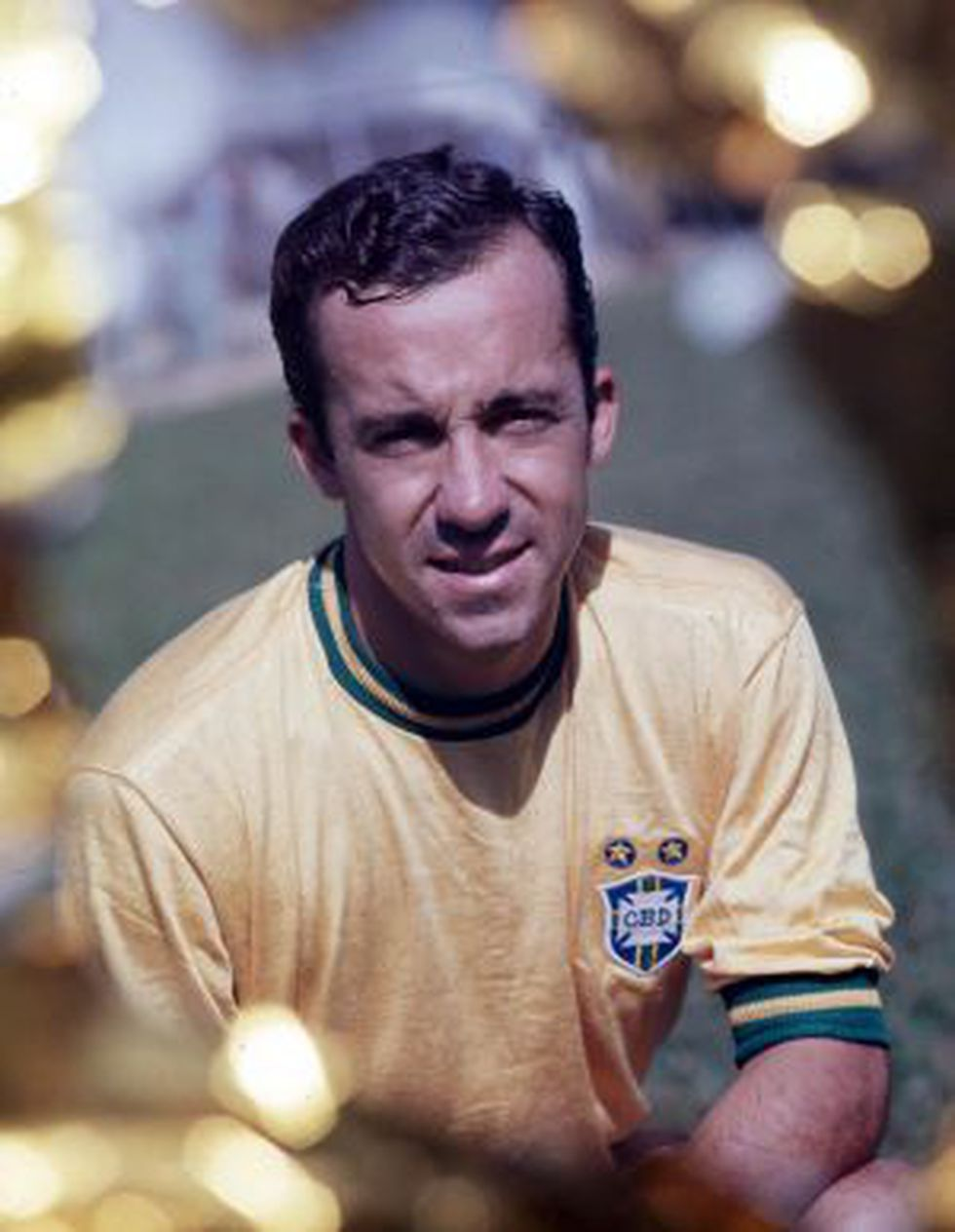
- Tostão in 1970

Personal information
- Full name: Eduardo Gonçalves de Andrade
- Date of birth: 25 January 1947 (age 79)
- Place of birth: Belo Horizonte, Minas Gerais, Brazil
- Height: 1.72 m (5 ft 7 1/2 in)
- Positions: Forward; attacking midfielder

Youth career
- 1961: Cruzeiro

Senior career*
Years	Team	Apps	(Gls)
1962–1963	América Mineiro	26	(16)
1963–1972	Cruzeiro	378	(249)
1972–1973	Vasco da Gama	45	(6)
Total		449	(271)

International career
1966–1972	Brazil	54	(32)
Medal record
Men's Football
Representing Brazil
FIFA World Cup
Winner	1970 Mexico
- * Club domestic league appearances and goals

Eduardo Gonçalves de Andrade (born 25 January 1947), generally known as Tostão (Brazilian Portuguese: [tosˈtɐ̃w̃]), is a Brazilian former professional footballer who played as a forward or attacking midfielder and was a physician.

Tostão was an intelligent, hardworking and prolific left-footed forward, who was known for his creativity and technical skills, and was considered one of the best players in the world in his prime and arguably the best player in the world in the early 70s alongside Cruyff before health problems forced his early retirement. Tostão was widely considered at the time the second best or even the best Brazilian player in the late 60s alongside Pelé, even ahead of other stars that would be part of the legendary 1970 Brazil squad. He played most of his 11-year career with Cruzeiro.

Tostão represented Brazil in two World Cups, winning the tournament in 1970. He formed a lethal offensive partnership with Pelé in the national team.

== Football career ==
Born in Belo Horizonte, Minas Gerais, Eduardo Andrade received, like the vast majority of Brazilian footballers, a nickname early into his football career, being dubbed 'Tostão' ('little coin'). Legend has it that as a six-year-old school boy he netted 47 goals in one game for his primary school football team.

Tostão made his professional debut aged only 15, for local América Mineiro, returning after two years to Cruzeiro, where he had started his youth career. Although being a centre midfielder, he was crowned the Campeonato Mineiro's topscorer on three consecutive occasions, the first in 1966, and left the club as its all-time scorer, with a total of 249 goals.

In the 1970 FIFA World Cup, improvised as a forward, Tostão scored two of his 32 goals for Brazil, and assisted four, as the national team won its third trophy, whilst finding the net on 19 occasions. The previous year, after being hit in the face by a ball during a match against Corinthians, he suffered a detached retina from which he never fully recovered. In April 1972, he signed for Vasco da Gama for a then record fee in the country but, after good overall displays, was forced to retire from the game at only 26, after his sight problems resurfaced, despite attempts at corrective surgery.

Weary of football and fame, Tostão became a medical doctor, but ultimately rejoined the footballing world, working as a journalist and pundit on TV and writing for newspapers and magazines.

== Style of play ==
Tostão was, due to his relatively small stature and slender frame, not particularly skilled in the air; in spite of his lack of pace, strong physical attributes, or long-range shooting abilities, however, he was a mobile, intelligent, and hard-working footballer, who stood out throughout his career due to his anticipation and timing in the penalty area, which made him a prolific goalscorer. A predominantly left-footed player, in his prime, he was considered one of the best players in the world, and was known for his technique, balance, and dribbling skills, while also contributing with many assists thanks to his vision, creativity, precise passing and playmaking abilities, as well as his work-rate, which often saw him drop back into midfield in order to retrieve the ball and start attacking plays. He was also known for his ability to disorient defenders and get onto the end of passes or create space for teammates with his movement and runs off the ball, which saw him act in a role which was essentially functioning as a precursor of the modern false 9 role with Brazil during the 1970 World Cup, despite being deployed as a centre-forward on paper. Due to his versatility and wide range of skills, he was capable of playing in several attacking and midfield positions including as an attacking midfielder, as a second striker, as a left winger, or even as an out-and-out striker.

== Career statistics ==
=== International goals ===
No.	Date	Venue	Opponent	Score	Result	Competition	Ref.
1.	5 June 1966	Mineirão, Belo Horizonte, Brazil	Poland	2–1	4–1	Friendly	
2.	5 June 1966	Mineirão, Belo Horizonte, Brazil	Poland	3–1	4–1	Friendly	
3.	8 June 1966	Maracanã Stadium, Rio de Janeiro, Brazil	Peru	2–0	3–1	Friendly	
4.	30 June 1966	Ullevi, Gothenburg, Sweden	Sweden	1–0	3–2	Friendly	
5.	30 June 1966	Ullevi, Gothenburg, Sweden	Sweden	3–1	3–2	Friendly	
6.	15 July 1966	Goodison Park, Liverpool, England	Hungary	1–1	1–3	1966 FIFA World Cup	
7.	9 June 1968	Pacaembu Stadium, São Paulo, Brazil	Uruguay	1–0	2–0	1968 Copa Río Branco	
8.	16 June 1968	Neckarstadion, Stuttgart, West Germany	West Germany	1–2	1–2	Friendly	
9.	20 June 1968	10th-Anniversary Stadium, Warsaw, Poland	Poland	3–2	6–3	Friendly	
10.	20 June 1968	10th-Anniversary Stadium, Warsaw, Poland	Poland	4–2	6–3	Friendly	
11.	25 June 1968	JNA Stadion, Belgrade, Yugoslavia	Yugoslavia	2–0	2–0	Friendly	
12.	30 June 1968	Estádio da Machava, Lourenço Marques, Mozambique	Portugal	2–0	2–0	Friendly	
13.	17 July 1968	Estadio Nacional de Lima, Lima, Peru	Peru	3–0	4–0	Friendly	
14.	6 November 1968	Maracanã Stadium, Rio de Janeiro, Brazil	FIFA XI	3–0	4–0	Friendly	(Note: This match celebrated the 10th anniversary of Brazil's 1958 FIFA World Cup victory. In 2001, FIFA decided not to count matches involving its representative team as senior internationals, but the Brazilian Federation continues to recognise it as official.)
15.	9 April 1969	Maracanã Stadium, Rio de Janeiro, Brazil	Peru	2–1	2–1	Friendly	
16.	12 June 1969	Maracanã Stadium, Rio de Janeiro, Brazil	England	1–1	2–1	Friendly	
17.	6 August 1969	Estadio El Campín, Bogotá, Colombia	Colombia	1–0	2–0	1970 FIFA World Cup qualification	
18.	6 August 1969	Estadio El Campín, Bogotá, Colombia	Colombia	2–0	2–0	1970 FIFA World Cup qualification	
19.	10 August 1969	Estadio Olímpico, Caracas, Venezuela	Venezuela	1–0	6–0	1970 FIFA World Cup qualification	
20.	10 August 1969	Estadio Olímpico, Caracas, Venezuela	Venezuela	3–0	6–0	1970 FIFA World Cup qualification	
21.	10 August 1969	Estadio Olímpico, Caracas, Venezuela	Venezuela	4–0	6–0	1970 FIFA World Cup qualification	
22.	21 August 1969	Maracanã Stadium, Rio de Janeiro, Brazil	Colombia	1–0	6–2	1970 FIFA World Cup qualification	
23.	21 August 1969	Maracanã Stadium, Rio de Janeiro, Brazil	Colombia	2–1	6–2	1970 FIFA World Cup qualification	
24.	24 August 1969	Maracanã Stadium, Rio de Janeiro, Brazil	Venezuela	1–0	6–0	1970 FIFA World Cup qualification	
25.	24 August 1969	Maracanã Stadium, Rio de Janeiro, Brazil	Venezuela	2–0	6–0	1970 FIFA World Cup qualification	
26.	24 August 1969	Maracanã Stadium, Rio de Janeiro, Brazil	Venezuela	3–0	6–0	1970 FIFA World Cup qualification	
27.	14 June 1970	Estadio Jalisco, Guadalajara, Mexico	Peru	2–0	4–2	1970 FIFA World Cup	
28.	14 June 1970	Estadio Jalisco, Guadalajara, Mexico	Peru	3–1	4–2	1970 FIFA World Cup	
29.	30 September 1970	Maracanã Stadium, Rio de Janeiro, Brazil	Mexico	2–0	2–1	Friendly	
30.	14 July 1971	Maracanã Stadium, Rio de Janeiro, Brazil	Czechoslovakia	1–0	1–0	Friendly	
31.	31 July 1971	Estadio Monumental, Buenos Aires, Argentina	Argentina	1–1	2–2	1971 Roca Cup	
32.	26 April 1972	Estádio Beira-Rio, Porto Alegre, Brazil	Paraguay	2–0	3–2	Friendly	

== Honours ==
Cruzeiro

- Campeonato Brasileiro Série A: 1966
- Campeonato Mineiro: 1965, 1966, 1967, 1968, 1969

Brazil

- FIFA World Cup: 1970
- Independence Cup: 1972

Individual

- Bola de Prata: 1970
- Campeonato Brasileiro Série A top scorer: 1970 (12 goals)
- South American Footballer of the Year: 1971
- IFFHS Brazilian Player of the 20th Century: 5th place
- IFFHS South American Player of the 20th Century: 13th place
- World Soccer: The 100 Greatest Footballers of All Time
- Brazilian Football Museum Hall of Fame
