= Everaldo (footballer, born 1944) =

Brazilian footballer

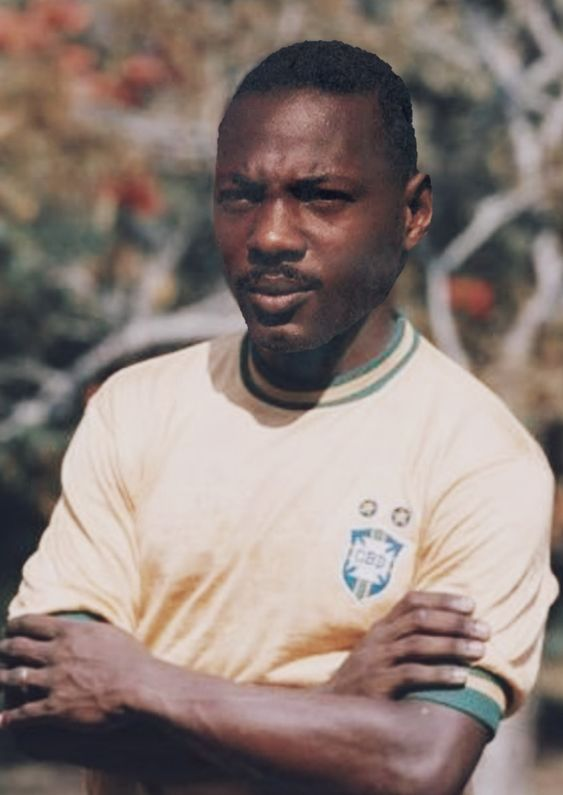
- Everaldo in 1970

Personal information
- Full name: Everaldo Marques da Silva
- Date of birth: 11 September 1944
- Place of birth: Porto Alegre, Brazil
- Date of death: 28 October 1974 (aged 30)
- Place of death: Santa Cruz do Sul, Brazil
- Height: 1.78 m (5 ft 10 in)
- Position: Left back

Youth career
- 1957–1964: Grêmio

Senior career*
| Years | Team | Apps | (Gls) |
| 1964–1974 | Grêmio | | |
| 1965 | → Juventude (loan) | | |

International career
| 1967–1972 | Brazil | 24 | (0) |
Medal record
Men's Football
Representing Brazil
FIFA World Cup
| Winner | 1970 Mexico |
- * Club domestic league appearances and goals

Everaldo Marques da Silva (11 September 1944 – 28 October 1974), nicknamed Everaldo, was a Brazilian footballer who played as a left back for Grêmio and the Brazil national team. He won the 1970 FIFA World Cup. The golden star in Grêmio's flag was added in 1970 in his homage.

== Club career ==
Everaldo was born in Porto Alegre. He spent his entire club career with Grêmio except for a loan at Juventude.

He died in a car accident on 28 October 1974 in Santa Cruz do Sul.

== International career ==
Everaldo had 24 caps with the Brazil national team between 1967 and 1972. The first one was obtained in June 1967.

Everaldo won the 1970 FIFA World Cup. He was defeated only once, in October 1968.

== Honours ==
Brazil

- FIFA World Cup: 1970
- Roca Cup: 1967
- Rio Branco Cup: 1967

Grêmio

- Campeonato Gaúcho: 1964, 1966, 1967, 1968

Individual

- Brazilian Silver Ball: 1970
