= 1970 FIFA World Cup =

Association football tournament in Mexico

Copa Mundial de Fútbol México '70 (Spanish)

Tournament details
- Host country: Mexico
- Dates: 31 May – 21 June
- Teams: 16 (from 5 confederations)
- Venues: 5 (in 5 host cities)

Final positions
- Champions: Brazil (3rd title)
- Runners-up: Italy
- Third place: West Germany
- Fourth place: Uruguay

Tournament statistics
- Matches played: 32
- Goals scored: 95 (2.97 per match)
- Attendance: 1,603,975 (50,124 per match)
- Top scorer: (West Germany) Gerd Müller (10 goals)
- Best player: (Brazil) Pelé
- Best young player: (Peru) Teófilo Cubillas
- Fair play award: Peru

The 1970 FIFA World Cup was the ninth edition of the FIFA World Cup, the quadrennial international football championship for men's senior national teams. Held from 31 May to 21 June in Mexico, it was the first World Cup tournament held outside Europe and South America, and also the first hosted in North America. Teams representing 75 nations from all six populated continents entered the competition, and its qualification rounds began in May 1968. Fourteen teams qualified from this process to join host nation Mexico and defending champions England in the 16-team final tournament. El Salvador, Israel and Morocco made their debut appearances at the final stage.

In the tournament final, Brazil won 4–1 against Italy, another FIFA two-time champion (and UEFA Euro 1968 winner). Brazil also overcame another two-time champion and South American champions Uruguay, by 3–1 in the semi-final, and defending champions England 1–0 in the group stage as they were also eliminated by West Germany in the quarter-finals. This is currently the only time that the winning team defeated the European and South American champions alongside the tournament's defending champions.

The win gave Brazil their third World Cup title, which allowed them to permanently keep the Jules Rimet Trophy, and a new trophy was introduced in 1974. The victorious team, led by Carlos Alberto and featuring players such as Pelé, Gérson, Jairzinho, Rivellino and Tostão, is often cited as the greatest football team of all time. They achieved a perfect record of wins in all six games in the finals, as well as winning all their qualifying fixtures.

Despite the issues of altitude and high temperature, the finals largely produced attacking football which created an average goals per game record not since bettered by any subsequent World Cup Finals. With the advancements in satellite communications, the 1970 Finals attracted a new record television audience for the FIFA World Cup as games were broadcast live around the world and, in a few cases, in colour—the first time that that was the case.

== Host selection ==
Mexico was chosen as the host nation on 8 October 1964 vote at the FIFA congress in Tokyo, where the only other bid submitted was by Argentina, which would go on to host the 1978 World Cup.

The 1970 selection of Mexico as host would mark several distinctions. It was the first World Cup that was staged in North America and the first to be staged outside of South America and Europe. Further distinction would come to Mexico at the 1986 World Cup when it became the first country to host the FIFA World Cup twice after stepping in as a substitute for Colombia, which was struggling financially.

== Qualification ==
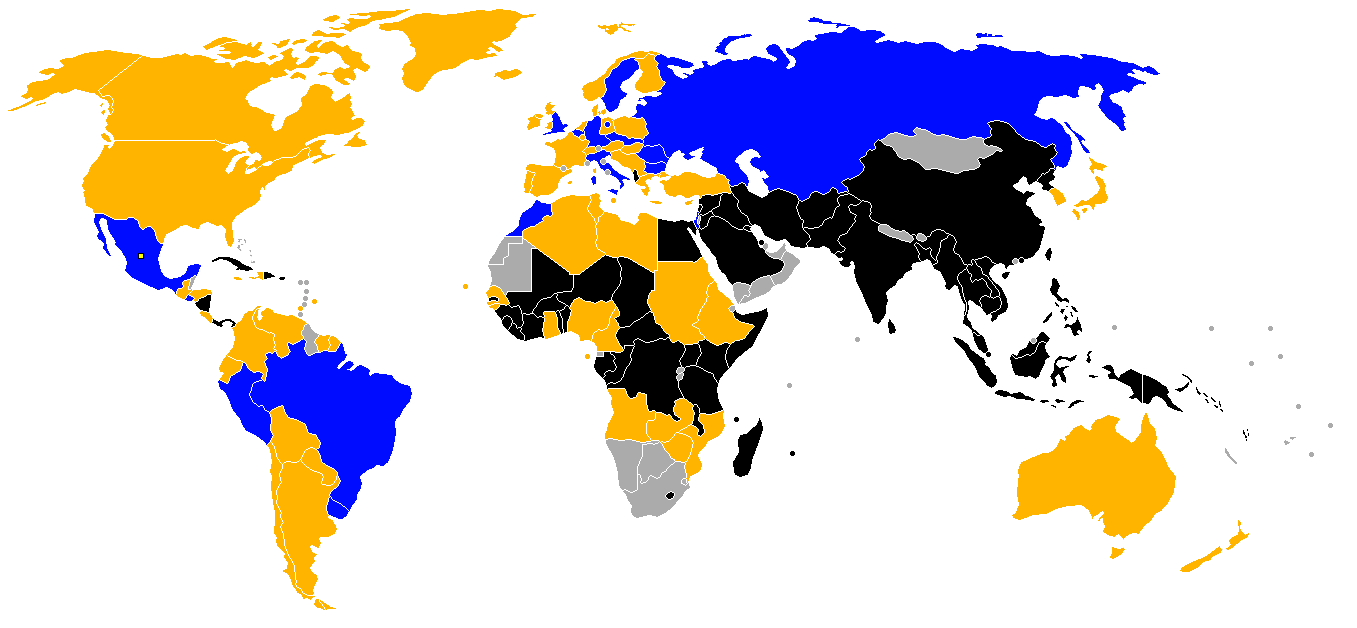
Nation qualified for World Cup Nation failed to qualify Nation did not enter World Cup Nation not a FIFA member in 1970

A total of 75 teams entered the 1970 FIFA World Cup, and 73 were required to qualify. Due to rejected entries and withdrawals, 68 teams eventually participated in the qualifying stages, including eight for the first time. Mexico as the host nation and England as reigning World Cup champions were granted automatic qualification, with the remaining 14 finals places divided among the continental confederations.

Eight places were available to teams from UEFA (Europe), three for CONMEBOL (South America), one for CAF (Africa), one for a team from either the AFC or the OFC (Asia/Oceania), and one for CONCACAF (North and Central America and Caribbean).

A place in the finals for an African team was guaranteed for the first time: this came in response to the events of 1966, where all 15 entered African nations boycotted the qualifying in protest after FIFA – which had combined the qualifying for Africa, Asia and Oceania into one group for only one place at the finals – declined CAF's requests to change the qualifying format and the allocation of places, citing competitive and logistical issues. Thus, while Morocco was the first African team to qualify for the World Cup since Egypt in 1934, they were the first to be assured qualification via their own continental zone, since Egypt had to play against the British-occupied Palestine to qualify for the 1934 tournament.

The draw for the qualifying stages was conducted on 1 February 1968, with matches beginning in May 1968 and the final fixtures being concluded in December 1969. North Korea, quarter-finalists at the previous tournament, were disqualified during the process after refusing to play in Israel for political reasons. El Salvador qualified for the finals after beating Honduras in a play-off match, which was the catalyst for a four-day conflict in July 1969 known as the Football War.

Half of the eventual qualifying teams had also been present at the previous World Cup, but three teams qualified for the first time: El Salvador, Israel and Morocco, while Peru, Romania, Belgium and Sweden made their first World Cup appearances since 1930, 1938, 1954 and 1958 respectively. Czechoslovakia returned to the World Cup stage after missing out in 1966.

=== List of qualified teams ===
The following 16 teams qualified for the final tournament.

AFC (1)

- Israel (debut)

CAF (1)

- Morocco (debut)

OFC (0)

- None qualified

CONCACAF (2)

- El Salvador (debut)
- Mexico (hosts)

CONMEBOL (3)

- Brazil
- Peru
- Uruguay

UEFA (9)

- Belgium
- Bulgaria
- Czechoslovakia
- England (holders)
- Italy
- Romania
- Soviet Union
- Sweden
- West Germany

As of 2026, this was the only time Israel qualified for a FIFA World Cup finals, and also the only time Argentina failed to qualify (they declined to participate in 1938, 1950 and 1954).

== Venues ==
Five stadiums in five cities were selected to host the World Cup matches. Alternative venues in Hidalgo state and the port city of Veracruz were also considered. Each group was based solely in one city with exception of Group 2, which was staged in both Puebla and Toluca. Aside from the Estadio Luis Dosal, all the stadia had only been constructed during the 1960s, as Mexico prepared to host both the World Cup and the 1968 Summer Olympics. The stadium construction cost for the four smaller venues were around US$11 million, while the final stadium in Mexico City cost US$20 million.

All sites were in Central Mexico, on the Mexican Plateau; none were below 1,500 metres (4,900 ft) above sea level. The altitude of the venues varied and the importance of acclimatisation was strongly considered by all the participating teams. As a result, in contrast to the previous tournament staged in England, most teams arrived in the region well in advance of their opening fixtures to prepare for this factor. Some teams had already experienced the local conditions when competing in the football competition at 1968 Summer Olympics. At an elevation in excess of 2,660 metres (8,730 ft) above sea level, Toluca was the highest of the venues; Guadalajara was the lowest at 1,500 m (4,920 ft). In addition to the altitude, all five locations had hot and rainy weather where temperatures would regularly go past 32 °C (90 °F).

Of the five stadia used for the 32 matches played, the largest and most utilised venue was the Azteca Stadium in Mexico City, which hosted 10 total matches including the final and match for third place, and all of Group 1's matches (which included all of host Mexico's matches). The Jalisco Stadium in Guadalajara hosted eight matches including all of Group 3's matches and a semi-final. The Nou Camp Stadium in Leon hosted seven matches, which consisted of all of Group 4's matches and a quarter-final match. The Luis Dosal stadium in Toluca hosted four matches, and Cuauhtémoc stadium in Puebla hosted three matches and was the only stadium of the five used for this tournament not to host any knockout rounds.

Mexico City, Federal District	Guadalajara, Jalisco	Puebla City, Puebla	Toluca, State of Mexico	León, Guanajuato
Estadio Azteca	Estadio Jalisco	Estadio Cuauhtémoc	Estadio Luis Dosal	Estadio Nou Camp
Capacity: 107,247	Capacity: 71,100	Capacity: 35,563	Capacity: 26,900	Capacity: 23,609
1970 FIFA World Cup is located in Mexico

== Format ==
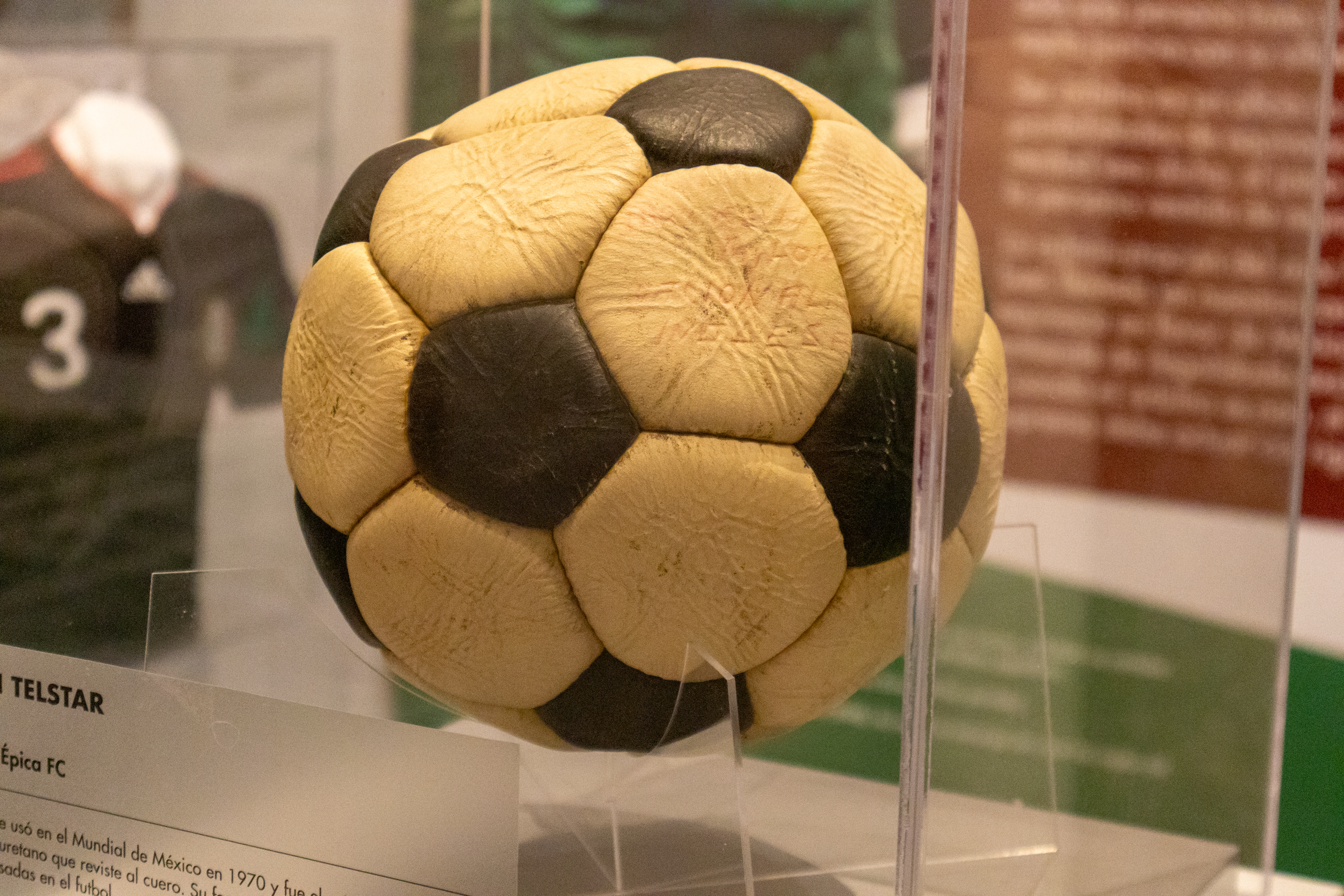
An Adidas Telstar football used at the 1970 World Cup matches.

The 16 qualified teams were divided into four groups of four. Each group was played as a single round-robin in which each team would play each of the others in their group once. Teams were ranked by the number of points earned from their matches (two points were awarded for a win and one for a draw), and goal difference was used as the primary tie-breaker; if two teams finished level on both points and goal difference, lots were drawn to separate them. This method was used to separate the top two teams in Group 1 (Soviet Union and Mexico), but it was not used to separate Bulgaria and Morocco in Group 4, despite them finishing level on points and goal difference, as they were both eliminated anyways.

The top two teams from each group progressed to the knockout stage. In all knockout matches, extra time was played if the teams were drawn after 90 minutes. If teams were still tied after extra-time, drawing of lots would have been used in all matches other than the final. FIFA did not announce in advance what would happen if the final itself were to be drawn after extra time. In the event, all knockout matches were decided in either regular time or extra time.

== Final draw ==
Although it was reported in the build-up to the final draw that seedings would be used, as had been the case at the previous two World Cup Finals, the FIFA Organising Committee ultimately announced on the same day of the draw, that there would be no seeding of teams due to failed attempts to reach a compromise for the seeding criteria. Instead, the 16 qualified teams were divided into four pots comprising 'geographical groupings' decided by a vote of the FIFA Organising Committee, which for the composition of pot 1, 3 and 4 also took into account the teams' strengths and even political considerations. The tournament structure ensured that teams grouped within the same pot would not meet each other before the quarter-finals at the earliest. The system of politically decided pots hereby ensured that Israel and Morocco would not be drawn to face each other after Morocco had earlier threatened to withdraw from the tournament, as they had done from the Olympic football tournament two years earlier, if that were the case.

Pot 1: European I	Pot 2: Americas	Pot 3: European II	Pot 4: Rest of the World
England (holders, group 3); Italy; Soviet Union; West Germany	Mexico (hosts, group 1); Brazil; Peru; Uruguay	Belgium; Bulgaria; Czechoslovakia; Sweden	El Salvador; Israel; Morocco; Romania

The draw was staged in Mexico City, Mexico on 10 January 1970 in the Maria Isabel Hotel, which served as FIFA's headquarters during the competition. The teams were drawn into the four groups, which had their locations defined in advance: Group 1 being staged in Mexico City, Group 2 in Puebla and Toluca, Group 3 in Guadalajara and Group 4 in León. Ahead of the draw, the FIFA regulations had predetermined that the hosts Mexico would be in Group 1 and so based in the capital city, and that England as holders would be based together with Group 3 in Guadalajara, the tournament's second largest stadium. Keeping the defending champion (holders) apart from meeting the hosts in the group stage either by seeding or predetermined group positions, was a practiced tradition throughout the history of the FIFA World Cup, with 1934 and 1954 being the only two exceptions.

The 10-year-old daughter of Guillermo Cañedo, president of the Mexican Football Federation and chief of the FIFA Organising Committee, drew out the teams from four silver cups, so that each of the four groups featured one drawn team respectively from pot 1, pot 2, pot 3 and pot 4.

== Match officials ==
AFC

- (Israel) Abraham Klein

CAF

- (Ethiopia) Seyoum Tarekegn
- (United Arab Republic) Ali Kandil

CONCACAF

- (Canada) Werner Winsemann
- (Mexico) Abel Aguilar Elizalde
- (Mexico) Diego De Leo
- (Mexico) Arturo Yamasaki
- (United States) Henry Landauer

CONMEBOL

- (Argentina) Ángel Norberto Coerezza
- (Brazil) Antônio de Moraês
- (Chile) Rafael Hormázabal
- (Uruguay) Ramón Barreto

UEFA

- (Austria) Ferdinand Marschall
- (Belgium) Vital Loraux
- (East Germany) Rudi Glöckner
- (England) Jack Taylor
- (France) Roger Machin
- (Italy) Antonio Sbardella
- (Netherlands) Laurens van Ravens
- (Portugal) António Ribeiro Saldanha
- (Romania) Andrei Rădulescu
- (Scotland) Bob Davidson
- (Spain) Ortiz de Mendíbil
- (Soviet Union) Tofik Bakhramov
- (Switzerland) Rudolf Scheurer
- (West Germany) Kurt Tschenscher

== Squads ==
A tournament squad was limited to no more than 22 players; Morocco named only 19 players in their squad.

== Tournament review ==
=== Group stage ===
Following the opening ceremony host nation Mexico faced the Soviet Union; this was the last time until the 2006 World Cup that the host nation's first match rather than the World Cup holders' began the tournament. Both this opening match of Group 1 and many others during the competition kicked off at noon for the benefit of European television schedules, meaning play under the midday sun. The match produced a goalless draw, prompting some media to predict the entire tournament would be played at the slow tempo that featured in this game given the conditions involved. Following the half-time interval Anatoliy Puzach became the first substitute to be used in FIFA World Cup history as the Soviets made use of the new competition rule. Both teams won their remaining two games to progress from the group at the expense of Belgium and World Cup debutants El Salvador.

Group 2 was the lowest-scoring of the groups with only six goals in its six matches as Uruguay, reigning South America champions, and Italy, the reigning European champions, edged past Sweden and Israel. Sweden would have progressed if they had produced a two-goal victory against Uruguay in their final game, but it was not until the final minute that they scored the only goal of the game. Hours before the game FIFA elected to replace the scheduled referee after bribery rumours – later dismissed by FIFA – arose in Mexico. The 1–0 result meant that Uruguay advanced, to be joined by Italy after they avoided defeat in the group finale against Israel.

Owing to the lack of a seeding system, Group 3 allowed the reigning World Cup holders England to be paired together with the two-time former champion Brazil, considered by many the pre-tournament favourites for the trophy. England's preparations were hampered by the arrest of their captain Bobby Moore in Colombia for allegedly stealing a bracelet from a jeweller's shop; the charges were later dropped. The attitude of their manager Alf Ramsey and the English media in general was perceived by many locals as unfriendly and xenophobic toward Mexico's hosting of the competition, which meant the English team received a largely hostile response during the competition.

With both having won their opening games – against Czechoslovakia and Romania, respectively – Brazil met England in the group's most famed match. Although Gordon Banks in the English goal denied Pelé from close range with a reflex save that Pelé himself cited as the greatest of his career, a second-half goal from Jairzinho won the match for Brazil, after which England squandered several excellent opportunities to equalise. Both teams then won their final group games to progress to the knockout stage.

Play in Group 4 began with Bulgaria taking a two-goal lead against Peru, but a second half comeback gave the South Americans a 3–2 victory. Morocco, the first African World Cup representatives since 1934, also began strongly by taking the lead against the 1966 runners-up West Germany, but the Germans came back to win 2–1. West Germany also went behind against Bulgaria in their second match, but a Gerd Müller hat-trick helped them recover and win 5–2; the eventual Golden Boot winner Müller hit another hat-trick – the only hat-tricks of the entire tournament. – to win the group against Peru.

=== Knockout stage ===
==== Quarter-finals ====
Mexico and the Soviet Union had finished tied at the top of Group 1 on both points and goal difference, meaning that the drawing of lots was required to rank them. On 12 June, the draw allocated the Soviet Union the group winners' berth, meaning that they would face Uruguay at the Estadio Azteca, while the host nation were paired against Italy in the smaller Toluca venue. Mexican officials unsuccessfully appealed to FIFA to stage their game in the capital to avoid traffic problems. The hosts took the lead against Italy with a José Luis González goal, but his teammate Javier Guzmán equalised with an own goal before half-time. Italy then dominated the second half to progress to the semi-finals with a 4–1 win. The Soviet Union were also eliminated in their quarter-final when a Víctor Espárrago header three minutes from the end of extra-time sent Uruguay through. The Soviets had stopped play during Uruguay's attack leading to the goal, believing that the ball had crossed the touchline.

Official poster

The all-South America tie in Guadalajara was the highest-scoring of the four quarter-finals as Brazil recorded a 4–2 triumph over Peru. The match is considered to be one of the most entertaining matches in World Cup history: Brazil shot 27 times; Peru, 22. Next came a rematch of the previous World Cup final between England and West Germany that took place in León. The reigning champions took a two-goal lead, but Franz Beckenbauer halved the deficit when his low shot beat England's second-choice goalkeeper Peter Bonetti, who was playing after Gordon Banks suffered food poisoning the day before. Eight minutes from time, an Uwe Seeler header levelled the score. England's Geoff Hurst then had an apparently legitimate goal ruled out for offside. An extra-time goal from Gerd Müller brought (West) Germany's first-ever competitive victory over England.

==== Semi-finals ====
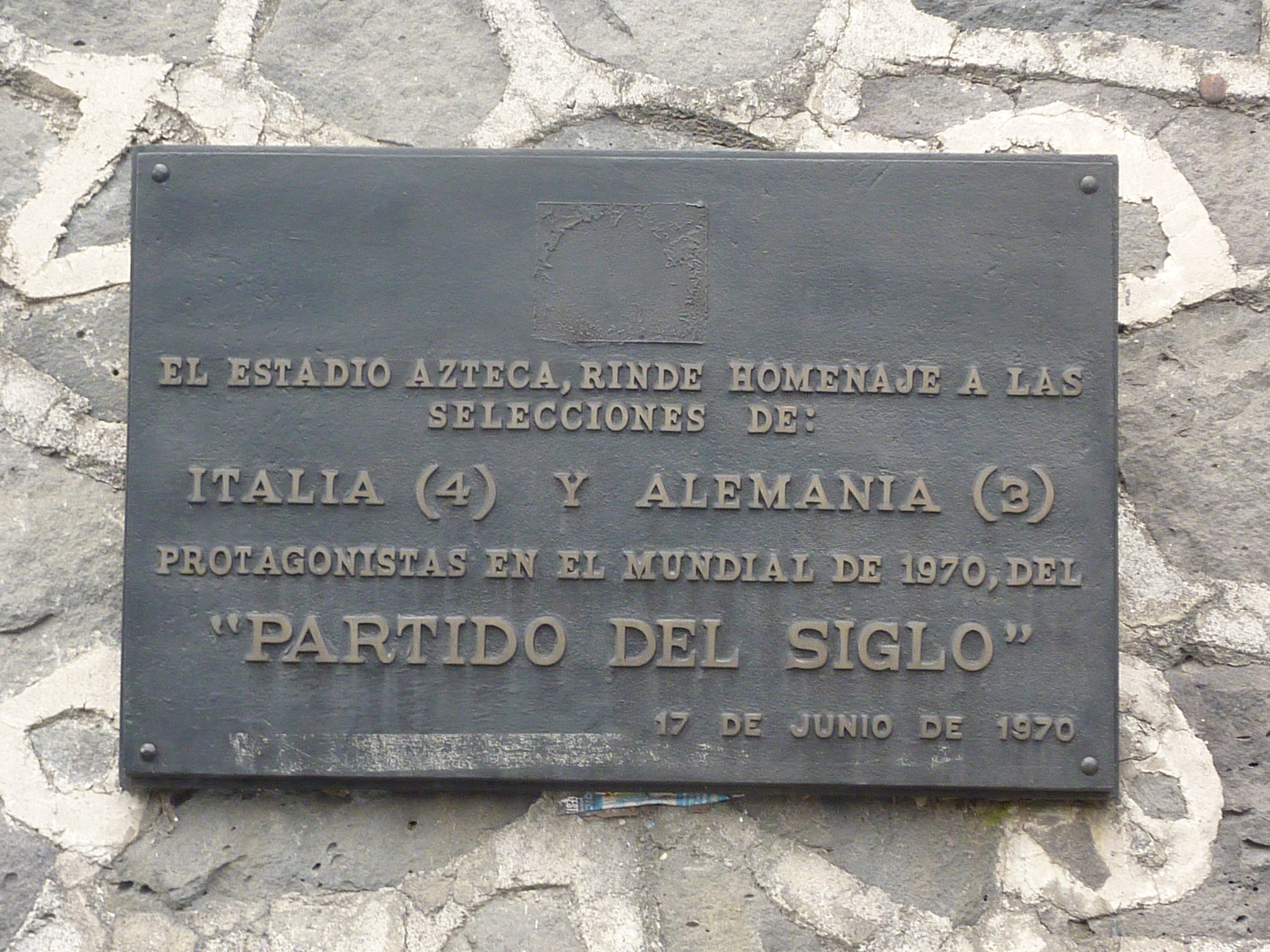
Plaque commemorating the "Game of the Century"

All four of the semi-finalists were former world champions, with the line-up guaranteeing a final between Europe and South America. In the all-South American tie, controversially switched from the capital to the lower altitude of Guadalajara, Brazil came from behind to defeat Uruguay 3–1 and earn the right to contest their fourth World Cup Final. Two Brazilian goals in the final 15 minutes decided a match that had been evenly-matched until that point. The all-European meeting between Italy and West Germany produced a match regarded by many as one of the greatest World Cup games of all time. Having led from the eighth minute through Roberto Boninsegna's strike, Italy were pegged back in injury time when sweeper Karl-Heinz Schnellinger scored his only international goal. Extra-time brought five more goals as the lead swung between the two sides until Gianni Rivera gave the Azzurri a decisive 4–3 lead. The match subsequently became known as the "Game of the Century", and today has a plaque outside the Estadio Azteca to commemorate it. West Germany went on to defeat Uruguay 1–0 in the match for third place.

==== Final ====
In the final, Brazil opened the scoring when Pelé headed in a cross from Rivellino in the 18th minute, but Roberto Boninsegna equalised for Italy after a series of blunders in the Brazilian defence. The match remained level until the 65th minute when a powerful shot from Gérson restored the Brazilians' lead. Further goals from Jairzinho and Carlos Alberto rewarded Brazil's attacking play and secured a 4–1 victory and a record third World Cup triumph, which earned them the right to permanently keep the Jules Rimet Trophy.

=== Legacy ===
Both the Brazilian team that were crowned champions of the 1970 World Cup and the tournament itself have become regarded as among the very finest in the history of the FIFA World Cup. In contrast to the more physical style of play that had dominated the previous two tournaments, the 1970 Finals are noted for the attacking play adopted by most teams.

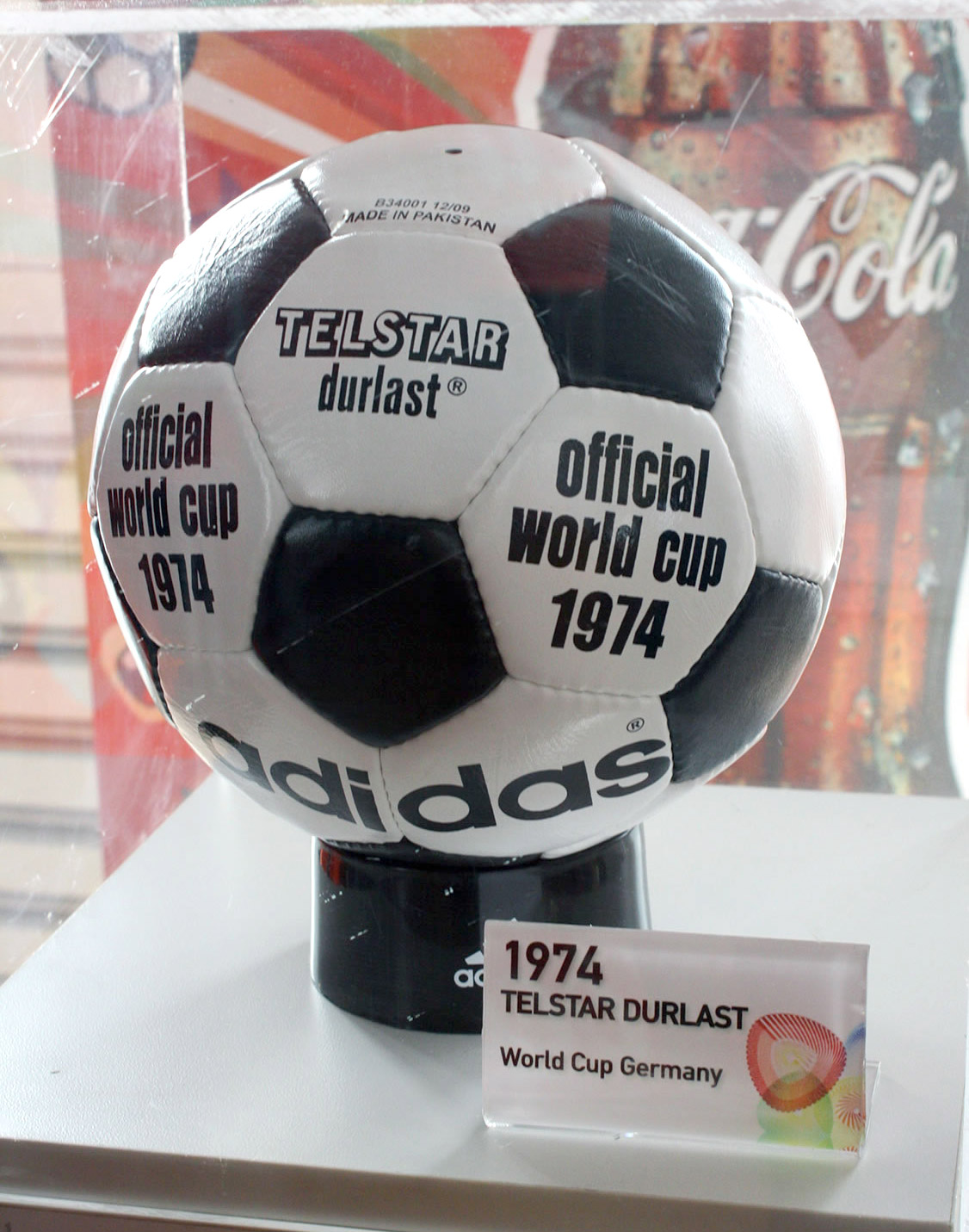
Adidas Telstar of 1974

For the first time at a World Cup Finals, referees could issue yellow and red cards (a system that is now commonplace at every level of football worldwide), yet, in contrast to the previous tournaments (besides the 1950 edition) and all subsequent tournaments to date, no player was expelled from play. The officiating of the opening match, commentated by some media as overly strict, set a standard of discipline that instead helped protect skillful players in accordance with FIFA's stated wish.

The eventual champions Brazil, led by Carlos Alberto, and featuring Pelé, Clodoaldo, Gérson, Jairzinho, Rivellino, and Tostão, is often cited as the greatest-ever World Cup team. They won all of their six games on the way to the title, and had also won every one of their qualifying fixtures. Jairzinho's feat of not only scoring in every finals match, but also winning each finals match likewise has yet to be equalled. Coach Mário Zagallo became the first man to win the World Cup as both a player (1958, 1962) and coach.

This was the first World Cup to use the Telstar ball from Adidas (who have supplied every World Cup match ball to date), introduced as the "Telstar Erlast" for the 1968 European Football Championship. The Telstar was the first World Cup ball to use the now-familiar truncated icosahedron for its design, consisting of 12 black pentagonal and 20 white hexagonal panels. The 32-panel configuration had been introduced in 1962 by Select Sport, and was also used in the official logo for the 1970 World Cup. The black-and-white pattern, to aid visibility on black and white television broadcasts (which was still commonplace then, as colour television was rare in many parts of the world), was also well established before the Telstar. The name came from the Telstar communications satellite, which was roughly spherical and dotted with solar panels, somewhat similar in appearance to the football.

=== Merchandise ===
Forming a partnership with FIFA in 1970, Panini published its first FIFA World Cup sticker album for the 1970 World Cup, initiating a global craze for collecting and trading stickers. In 2017, a complete 1970 World Cup Panini sticker album signed by Pelé sold for a record £10,450.

== Group stage ==
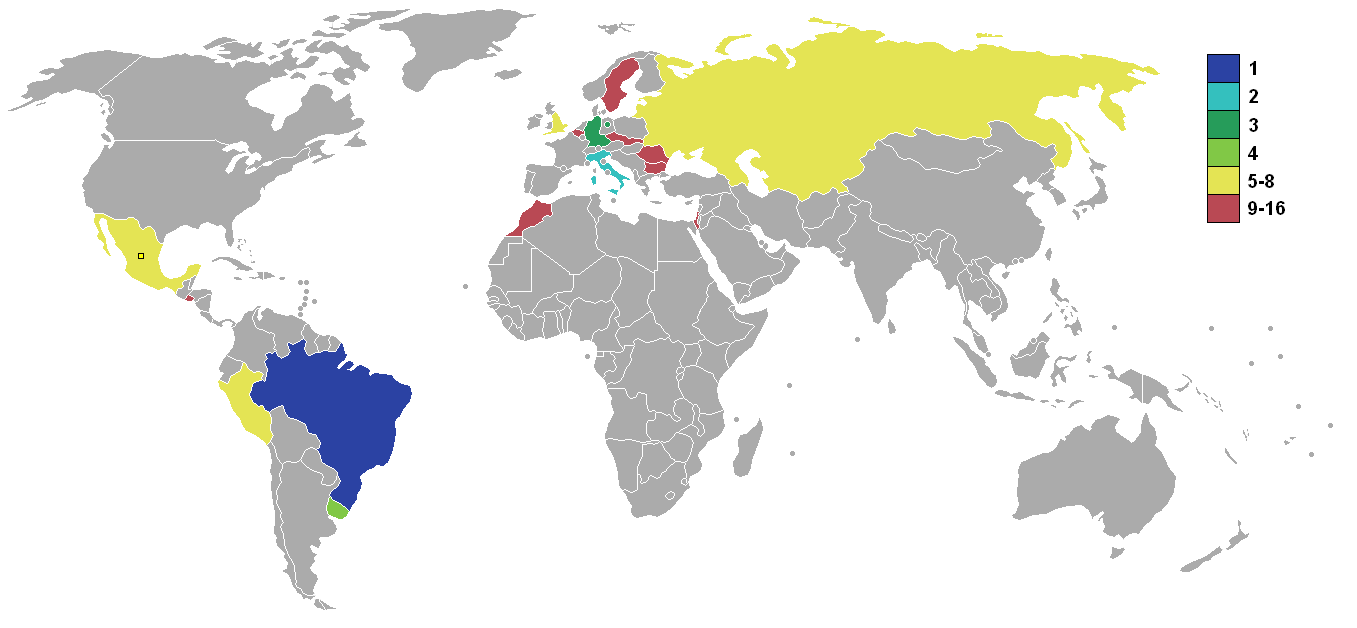
Champion Runner-up Third place Fourth place Quarter-finals Group stage

The first round, or group stage, saw the 16 teams divided into four groups of four teams. Each group was a round-robin of six games, where each team played one match against each of the other teams in the same group. Teams were awarded two points for a win, one point for a draw and none for a defeat. The teams finishing first and second in each group qualified for the quarter-finals, while the bottom two teams in each group were eliminated from the tournament.

Tie-breaking criteria

1. Greater number of points in all group matches
2. Goal difference in all group matches (replacing the previous usage of goal average)
3. Drawing of lots by the FIFA Organising Committee

=== Group 1 ===
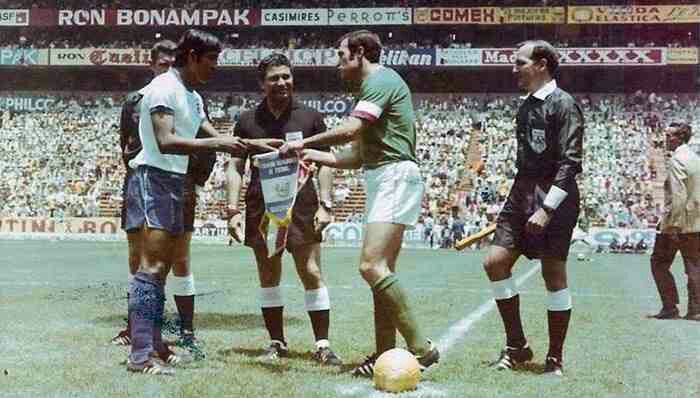
Salvadoran captain Salvador Mariona (in white) and Mexican captain Gustavo Peña (in green) before their match.

Pos	Team	Pld	W	D	L	GF	GA	GD	Pts	Qualification
1	Soviet Union	3	2	1	0	6	1	+5	5 (Note: Having finished level on both points and goal difference, the Soviet Union and Mexico were separated by the drawing of lots.)	Advance to knockout stage
2	Mexico	3	2	1	0	5	0	+5	5	Advance to knockout stage
3	Belgium	3	1	0	2	4	5	−1	2	
4	El Salvador	3	0	0	3	0	9	−9	0	

Source: FIFA
Notes:
31 May 1970
12:00

Mexico	0–0	Soviet Union

Estadio Azteca, Mexico City
Attendance: 107,160
Referee: Kurt Tschenscher (West Germany)
3 June 1970
16:00

Belgium	3–0	El Salvador
Van Moer 12', 54'; Lambert 79' (pen.)

Estadio Azteca, Mexico City
Attendance: 92,205
Referee: Andrei Rădulescu (Romania)

6 June 1970
16:00

Soviet Union	4–1	Belgium
Byshovets 14', 63'; Asatiani 57'; Khmelnytskyi 76'		Lambert 86'

Estadio Azteca, Mexico City
Attendance: 95,261
Referee: Rudolf Scheurer (Switzerland)
7 June 1970
12:00

Mexico	4–0	El Salvador
Valdivia 45', 46'; Fragoso 58'; Basaguren 83'

Estadio Azteca, Mexico City
Attendance: 103,058
Referee: Ali Kandil (United Arab Republic)

10 June 1970
16:00

Soviet Union	2–0	El Salvador
Byshovets 51', 74'

Estadio Azteca, Mexico City
Attendance: 89,979
Referee: Rafael Hormazábal Díaz (Chile)
11 June 1970
16:00

Mexico	1–0	Belgium
Peña 14' (pen.)

Estadio Azteca, Mexico City
Attendance: 108,192
Referee: Ángel Norberto Coerezza (Argentina)

=== Group 2 ===
Pos	Team	Pld	W	D	L	GF	GA	GD	Pts	Qualification
1	Italy	3	1	2	0	1	0	+1	4	Advance to knockout stage
2	Uruguay	3	1	1	1	2	1	+1	3	Advance to knockout stage
3	Sweden	3	1	1	1	2	2	0	3	
4	Israel	3	0	2	1	1	3	−2	2	

Source: FIFA
2 June 1970
16:00

Uruguay	2–0	Israel
Maneiro 23'; Mujica 50'

Estadio Cuauhtémoc, Puebla
Attendance: 20,654
Referee: Bobby Davidson (Scotland)
3 June 1970
16:00

Italy	1–0	Sweden
Domenghini 10'

Estadio Luis Dosal, Toluca
Attendance: 13,433
Referee: Jack Taylor (England)

6 June 1970
16:00

Uruguay	0–0	Italy

Estadio Cuauhtémoc, Puebla
Attendance: 29,968
Referee: Rudi Glöckner (East Germany)
7 June 1970
12:00

Sweden	1–1	Israel
Turesson 53'		Spiegler 56'

Estadio Luis Dosal, Toluca
Attendance: 9,624
Referee: Seyoum Tarekegn (Ethiopia)

10 June 1970
16:00

Sweden	1–0	Uruguay
Grahn 90'

Estadio Cuauhtémoc, Puebla
Attendance: 18,163
Referee: Henry Landauer (United States)
11 June 1970
16:00

Italy	0–0	Israel

Estadio Luis Dosal, Toluca
Attendance: 9,890
Referee: Ayrton Vieira de Moraes (Brazil)

=== Group 3 ===
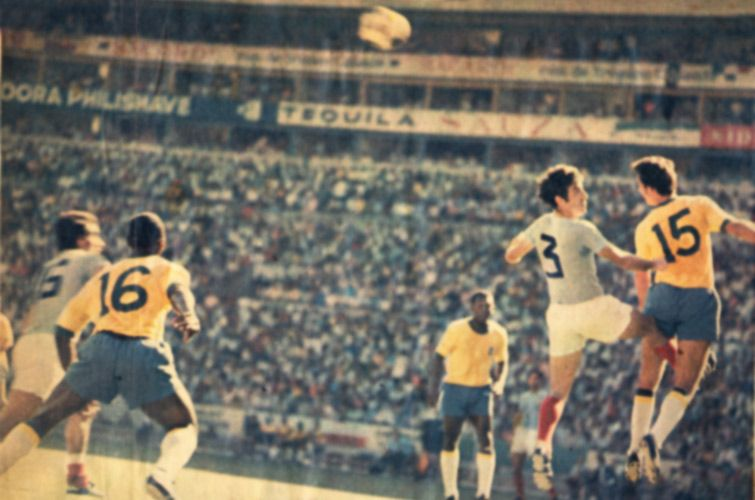
Fontana (yellow 15) and Everaldo (yellow 16) of Brazil playing against Nicolae Lupescu (white 3) and Alexandru Neagu (white 16) of Romania.

Pos	Team	Pld	W	D	L	GF	GA	GD	Pts	Qualification
1	Brazil	3	3	0	0	8	3	+5	6	Advance to knockout stage
2	England	3	2	0	1	2	1	+1	4	Advance to knockout stage
3	Romania	3	1	0	2	4	5	−1	2	
4	Czechoslovakia	3	0	0	3	2	7	−5	0	

Source: FIFA
2 June 1970
16:00

England	1–0	Romania
Hurst 65'

Estadio Jalisco, Guadalajara
Attendance: 50,560
Referee: Vital Loraux (Belgium)
3 June 1970
16:00

Brazil	4–1	Czechoslovakia
Rivellino 24'; Pelé 59'; Jairzinho 61', 83'		Petráš 11'

Estadio Jalisco, Guadalajara
Attendance: 52,897
Referee: Ramón Barreto (Uruguay)

6 June 1970
16:00

Romania	2–1	Czechoslovakia
Neagu 52'; Dumitrache 75' (pen.)		Petráš 5'

Estadio Jalisco, Guadalajara
Attendance: 56,818
Referee: Diego De Leo (Mexico)
7 June 1970
12:00

Brazil	1–0	England
Jairzinho 59'

Estadio Jalisco, Guadalajara
Attendance: 66,843
Referee: Abraham Klein (Israel)

10 June 1970
16:00

Brazil	3–2	Romania
Pelé 19', 67'; Jairzinho 22'		Dumitrache 34'; Dembrovschi 84'

Estadio Jalisco, Guadalajara
Attendance: 50,804
Referee: Ferdinand Marschall (Austria)
11 June 1970
16:00

England	1–0	Czechoslovakia
Clarke 50' (pen.)

Estadio Jalisco, Guadalajara
Attendance: 49,292
Referee: Roger Machin (France)

=== Group 4 ===
Pos	Team	Pld	W	D	L	GF	GA	GD	Pts	Qualification
1	West Germany	3	3	0	0	10	4	+6	6	Advance to knockout stage
2	Peru	3	2	0	1	7	5	+2	4	Advance to knockout stage
3	Bulgaria	3	0	1	2	5	9	−4	1	
3	Morocco	3	0	1	2	2	6	−4	1	

Source: FIFA
2 June 1970
16:00

Peru	3–2	Bulgaria
Gallardo 50'; Chumpitaz 55'; Cubillas 73'		Dermendzhiev 13'; Bonev 49'

Estadio Nou Camp, León
Attendance: 13,765
Referee: Antonio Sbardella (Italy)
3 June 1970
16:00

West Germany	2–1	Morocco
Seeler 56'; Müller 80'		Jarir 21'

Estadio Nou Camp, León
Attendance: 12,942
Referee: Laurens van Ravens (Netherlands)

6 June 1970
16:00

Peru	3–0	Morocco
Cubillas 65', 75'; Challe 67'

Estadio Nou Camp, León
Attendance: 13,537
Referee: Tofiq Bahramov (Soviet Union)
7 June 1970
12:00

West Germany	5–2	Bulgaria
Libuda 20'; Müller 27', 52' (pen.), 88'; Seeler 70'		Nikodimov 12'; Kolev 89'

Estadio Nou Camp, León
Attendance: 12,710
Referee: José María Ortiz de Mendíbil (Spain)

10 June 1970
16:00

West Germany	3–1	Peru
Müller 19', 26', 39'		Cubillas 44'

Estadio Nou Camp, León
Attendance: 17,875
Referee: Abel Aguilar Elizalde (Mexico)
11 June 1970
16:00

Bulgaria	1–1	Morocco
Zhechev 40'		Ghazouani 61'

Estadio Nou Camp, León
Attendance: 12,299
Referee: Antonio Ribeiro Saldanha (Portugal)

== Knockout stage ==
The eight teams that had advanced from the group stage entered a single-elimination style tournament, which also featured a match for third place contested between the two losing semi-finalists. In this knockout stage (including the final), if a match was level at the end of 90 minutes, extra time of two periods (15 minutes each) would be played. In matches prior to the final, if the score was still level after extra time then a coin toss by the referee would determine the winner. If the final was still level after 120 minutes' play then the match would instead be replayed at a later date.

=== Bracket ===
Quarter-finals
14 June – Mexico City
Soviet Union	0
Uruguay (a.e.t.)	1
14 June – Guadalajara
Brazil	4
Peru	2
14 June – Toluca
Italy	4
Mexico	1
14 June – León
West Germany (a.e.t.)	3
England	2

Semi-finals
17 June – Guadalajara
Uruguay	1
Brazil	3
17 June – Mexico City
Italy (a.e.t.)	4
West Germany	3

Final
21 June – Mexico City
Brazil	4
Italy	1
Match for third place
20 June – Mexico City
Uruguay	0
West Germany	1

All times listed local (UTC−6)

=== Quarter-finals ===
14 June 1970
12:00

Soviet Union	0–1 (a.e.t.)	Uruguay
		Espárrago 117'

Estadio Azteca, Mexico City
Attendance: 26,085
Referee: Laurens van Ravens (Netherlands)

14 June 1970
12:00

Italy	4–1	Mexico
Guzmán 25' (o.g.); Riva 63', 76'; Rivera 70'		González 13'

Estadio Luis Dosal, Toluca
Attendance: 26,851
Referee: Rudolf Scheurer (Switzerland)

14 June 1970
12:00

Brazil	4–2	Peru
Rivellino 11'; Tostão 15', 52'; Jairzinho 75'		Gallardo 28'; Cubillas 70'

Estadio Jalisco, Guadalajara
Attendance: 54,233
Referee: Vital Loraux (Belgium)

14 June 1970
12:00

West Germany	3–2 (a.e.t.)	England
Beckenbauer 68'; Seeler 82'; Müller 108'		Mullery 31'; Peters 49'

Estadio Nou Camp, León
Attendance: 23,357
Referee: Ángel Norberto Coerezza (Argentina)

=== Semi-finals ===
17 June 1970
16:00

Brazil	3–1	Uruguay
Clodoaldo 44'; Jairzinho 76'; Rivellino 89'		Cubilla 19'

Estadio Jalisco, Guadalajara (Note: This match was originally scheduled in Mexico City, Estadio Azteca. Three days before the semi-final the venue was changed to Guadalajara, Estadio Jalisco, despite Uruguayan appeals.)
Attendance: 51,261
Referee: José María Ortiz de Mendibil (Spain)

17 June 1970
16:00

Italy	4–3 (a.e.t.)	West Germany
Boninsegna 8'; Burgnich 98'; Riva 104'; Rivera 111'		Schnellinger 90+2'; Müller 94', 110'

Estadio Azteca, Mexico City
Attendance: 102,444
Referee: Arturo Yamasaki (Mexico)

=== Match for third place ===
20 June 1970
16:00

West Germany	1–0	Uruguay
Overath 26'

Estadio Azteca, Mexico City
Attendance: 104,403
Referee: Antonio Sbardella (Italy)

=== Final ===
21 June 1970
12:00 UTC−6

Brazil	4–1	Italy
Pelé 18'; Gérson 66'; Jairzinho 71'; Carlos Alberto 86'		Boninsegna 37'

Estadio Azteca, Mexico City
Attendance: 107,412
Referee: Rudi Glöckner (East Germany)

== Statistics ==
=== Goalscorers ===
With 10 goals, Gerd Müller was the top scorer in the tournament. In total, 95 goals were scored by 55 players, with only one of them credited as own goal.

10 goals

- (West Germany) Gerd Müller

7 goals

- (Brazil) Jairzinho

5 goals

- (Peru) Teófilo Cubillas

4 goals

- (Brazil) Pelé
- (Soviet Union) Anatoliy Byshovets

3 goals

- (Brazil) Rivellino
- (Italy) Gigi Riva
- (West Germany) Uwe Seeler

2 goals

- (Belgium) Raoul Lambert
- (Belgium) Wilfried Van Moer
- (Brazil) Tostão
- (Czechoslovakia) Ladislav Petráš
- (Italy) Roberto Boninsegna
- (Italy) Gianni Rivera
- (Mexico) Javier Valdivia
- (Peru) Alberto Gallardo
- (Romania) Florea Dumitrache

1 goal

- (Brazil) Carlos Alberto
- (Brazil) Clodoaldo
- (Brazil) Gérson
- (Bulgaria) Hristo Bonev
- (Bulgaria) Dinko Dermendzhiev
- (Bulgaria) Todor Kolev
- (Bulgaria) Asparuh Nikodimov
- (Bulgaria) Dobromir Zhechev
- (England) Allan Clarke
- (England) Geoff Hurst
- (England) Alan Mullery
- (England) Martin Peters
- (Israel) Mordechai Spiegler
- (Italy) Tarcisio Burgnich
- (Italy) Angelo Domenghini
- (Morocco) Maouhoub Ghazouani
- (Morocco) Houmane Jarir
- (Mexico) Juan Ignacio Basaguren
- (Mexico) Javier Fragoso
- (Mexico) José Luis González
- (Mexico) Gustavo Peña
- (Peru) Roberto Challe
- (Peru) Héctor Chumpitaz
- (Romania) Emerich Dembrovschi
- (Romania) Alexandru Neagu
- (Soviet Union) Kakhi Asatiani
- (Soviet Union) Vitaliy Khmelnytskyi
- (Sweden) Ove Grahn
- (Sweden) Tom Turesson
- (Uruguay) Luis Cubilla
- (Uruguay) Víctor Espárrago
- (Uruguay) Ildo Maneiro
- (Uruguay) Juan Mujica
- (West Germany) Franz Beckenbauer
- (West Germany) Reinhard Libuda
- (West Germany) Wolfgang Overath
- (West Germany) Karl-Heinz Schnellinger

1 own goal

- (Mexico) Javier Guzmán (playing against Italy)

=== Awards ===
- Golden Ball (awarded retrospectively): Pelé (Brazil)
- Golden Boot: Gerd Müller (West Germany)
- Best Young Player (awarded retrospectively): Teófilo Cubillas (Peru)
- FIFA Fair Play Trophy: Peru

=== Team of the Tournament ===
FIFA selected the following players for the 1970 FIFA World Cup All-Star Team.

Goalkeeper	Defenders	Midfielders	Forwards
(Uruguay) Ladislao Mazurkiewicz	(Brazil) Carlos Alberto Torres (Uruguay) Atilio Ancheta (Germany) Franz Beckenbauer (Italy) Giacinto Facchetti	(Brazil) Gérson (Brazil) Rivellino	(England) Bobby Charlton (Brazil) Jairzinho (Germany) Gerd Müller (Brazil) Pelé

=== Tournament ranking ===
In 1986, FIFA published a report that ranked all teams in each World Cup up to and including 1986, based on progress in the competition and overall results. The rankings for the 1970 tournament were as follows:

Per statistical convention in football, matches decided in extra time are counted as wins and losses.

Pos	Grp	Team	Pld	W	D	L	GF	GA	GD	Pts	Final result
1	3	Brazil	6	6	0	0	19	7	+12	12	Champions
2	2	Italy	6	3	2	1	10	8	+2	8	Runners-up
3	4	West Germany	6	5	0	1	17	10	+7	10	Third place
4	2	Uruguay	6	2	1	3	4	5	−1	5	Fourth place
5	1	Soviet Union	4	2	1	1	6	2	+4	5	Eliminated in quarter-finals
6	1	Mexico (H)	4	2	1	1	6	4	+2	5	Eliminated in quarter-finals
7	4	Peru	4	2	0	2	9	9	0	4	Eliminated in quarter-finals
8	3	England	4	2	0	2	4	4	0	4	Eliminated in quarter-finals
9	2	Sweden	3	1	1	1	2	2	0	3	Eliminated in group stage
=10	1	Belgium	3	1	0	2	4	5	−1	2	Eliminated in group stage
=10	3	Romania	3	1	0	2	4	5	−1	2	Eliminated in group stage
12	2	Israel	3	0	2	1	1	3	−2	2 (Note: FIFA originally ranked Israel above Bulgaria in the standings as Bulgaria finished third in their group, while Israel finished fourth. However, FIFA amended this in later publications by disregarding group position.)	Eliminated in group stage
13	4	Bulgaria	3	0	1	2	5	9	−4	1	Eliminated in group stage
14	4	Morocco	3	0	1	2	2	6	−4	1	Eliminated in group stage
15	3	Czechoslovakia	3	0	0	3	2	7	−5	0	Eliminated in group stage
16	1	El Salvador	3	0	0	3	0	9	−9	0	Eliminated in group stage

Source: FIFA
(H) Hosts
