= Hamidou Maiga =

Malian photographer (born 1932)

- Born: 1932 (age 93–94); Bobo-Dioulasso, Burkina Faso
- Occupation: Photographer
- Known for: Malian photographs

Hamidou Maiga (born 1932) is a Malian studio photographer among the region's pioneers in the craft during the postcolonial period. His work was largely unknown in the West prior to his discovery and display in the early 2010s. Maiga's early outdoor portraits from the Niger River region in the late 1950s reflect Mali's period of societal transition from colony to sovereignty. He has exhibited in solo shows in London and Lima, Peru.

== Early life and career ==
Maiga developed his photographic style while traveling the Niger River in the late 1950s.

Maiga was born in Bobo-Dioulasso, Burkina Faso, in 1932. He trained as a mason in Timbuktu, but entered photography in the early 1950s via photojournalism and his first medium format camera. After completing his apprenticeship, Maiga bought a set of photo lab equipment from a Ghanaian colleague. He opened his first studio in N'Gouma—a Malian Mopti region village—in 1958, and set out traveling along the Niger River looking for work, meeting interesting people, and practicing his photography fundamentals with the painted backdrops he transported. In this two-year period, he developed a style of outdoor studio portraits. His subjects had never before been photographed and some had never before seen a camera. Back in Timbuktu, he opened a studio where he photographed figures across politics, sports, and the arts. Maiga chose the costume, props, and painted backdrops for each portrait. His subjects would pose in the style of pop culture idols, flaunt amenities like cigarettes and radios, and dress in an eclectic style of blended Western and African sensibilities. His work captured Mali's societal transition from a French colony to a sovereign nation. He opened a studio in Bamako in 1973.

Maiga was among the Malian pioneers in post-colonial studio photography between the 1950s and 1970s. Maiga is acknowledged as a major figure in Malian portrait photography. Maiga's work was largely unknown to Western audiences before art dealer Jack Bell discovered Maiga's negatives in the early 2010s—while Maiga was in his 80s—and brought the work to a wider audience. Bell hosted Maiga's first solo exhibition, Talking Timbuktu, and the Victoria and Albert Museum in London acquired some of Maiga's work.

In 2016, Maiga's work was exhibited in the New York 1:54 fair and in a solo exhibition at the Peruvian Museo Mario Testino as part of its series on masters of photography. The museum placed Maiga in the tradition of itinerant photographers such as Martín Chambi and the Vargas brothers.

Maiga resides in Bamako.

== Selected solo exhibitions ==
- La ruta del Níger: de Mopti a Tombuctú, Museo Mario Testino, Lima, Peru, 2016
- Talking Timbuktu, Jack Bell Gallery, London, 2011
