= Carmelita Maracci =

American dancer and choreographer

Carmelita Maracci (July 17, 1908 – July 26, 1987) was an American concert dancer and choreographer who creatively combined ballet arts and Spanish techniques. She excelled when before an audience with dance experience, receiving enthusiastic praise from performers and critics. Her stage career began in the mid-1920s. Her programs often were of her own design. From the 1950s she remained influential as a Los Angeles-based teacher.

== Origins ==
Carmelita Maracci was born in Goldfield, Nevada, the daughter of Josephine Gauss and her second husband Joseph Maracci, a restaurateur and gambler. Her French German mother was a concert-level pianist. Her father, Italian and Spanish, had considered a career singing opera; his father was first cousin to Adelina Patti (1843–1919), a celebrated soprano. Hence the name Carmelita Patti Maracci. "Carmelita was brought up as Spanish." Her mother had told her that she was born in Montevideo, Uruguay; Maracci only learned differently much later from her husband.

After the family moved to San Francisco her formal schooling began at a convent. Later in Fresno she continued her dance lessons, while attending a private school for girls. "Carmie was her mother's spoiled darling." On a nine-foot Steinway her mother played, music to which "Carmie danced, from the moment she could move--danced before she could walk," according to what choreographer Agnes de Mille later learned.

In 1924, when sixteen, she relocated with her grandmother to Los Angeles, to widen her horizons and advance her dancing skills. She made her debut, traveled to study in New York City, toured with a show, then came to California. In Hollywood during the mid-1930s Agnes and Carmelita hung out together. De Mille described the situation and people:

"I found the atmosphere of the house, comforting. There was always a group of radicals, malcontents, and indigent writers, intermingled with painters and dancers, waiting to be recharged by Carmelita's personality, for she was great fun to be with."

Maracci's dancing was already special; it sparked "extravagant" rumors. "It is no ordinary experience to discover one evening that an intimate, a known, well-loved, daily companion, has genius." In her studio, the night before Maracci left for a San Francisco concert, de Mille saw her dance for the first time. She writes, "my jaw dropped". Adding, "This girl worked with thunder."

== New styles of dancing ==
In 1926 at the Hollywood Bowl Maracci had performed as a soloist, by way of her dance teacher Ernest Belcher. In New York she studied several dance styles, among her teachers: Hippolita Mora and Helba Huara (Spanish dance), and Enrico Zanfretta and Luigi Albertieri (ballet). Again as a soloist she toured with a dance company; in San Francisco she joined a small troupe. Maracci then ceased performing. While in seclusion she created her new style of dancing.

In 1930, she was ready to present for the first time "a program of her own works" to music by Ravel, de Falla, Granados, and Schumann, probably held at Trinity Auditorium. A similar debut in New York City came in 1937. Her arrival in New York was troubled by her sponsor's sudden default. Yet undeterred she continued, first on stage at the 92nd Street Y, then at other theatrical venues. Her performances were well received.

"Camelita Maracci, the fiery and brilliantly talented West Coast dancer, who combined ballet and Spanish dance" first performed at the Y. "Maracci mesmerized New Yorkers with her smoldering passion and unique movement style. Here were wonderfully spiraling hands, a spine that arched proudly, and dazzling technical footwork."

To ballet she added Spanish dance. Some techniques derived from baile flamenco. Inspired by flamenco Manuel de Falla, in his 1919 ballet El Sombrero de Tres Picos (French: Le Tricorne) delivered its music orchestrated. Choreographer Léonide Massine used elements from the two dance arts. In 1922 Falla and poet García Lorca with a coalition of artists produced Concurso de Cante Jondo, a flamenco song and dance festival in Granada.

Maracci's fusions of ballet and baile are notable. Whether solo or small group, some critics saw her shows as 'hybrid dance'. For her pas seul, with both novel and smooth, she'd syncopate the castanets. Simply done with the elegance of her dancer's art, her solo designs worked to dazzle audiences. These rare shows were worth the wait, the long lines. Freely she'd chosen from several traditions to create her works. From early neoclassical ballet she took, or from popular Spanish dance, not specifically flamenco yet with its moods and lines.

In Los Angeles in the late 1920s she had brought together in her person the ingredients to craft one-of-a-kind performances. "Maracci began to experiment with choreography that was a blend of ballet and Spanish dance techniques." From her conjuring of the two styles emerged a singularity. John Martin, then dance critic at The New York Times, came to conclude: "Both styles are merely materials out of which she fashions an art that is altogether personal, purely subjective in its creative approach, and utterly unique." Later Agnes de Mille retold it:

Plainly and simply, Carmelita's best dances were the most passionate and powerfully devised solos I have ever seen. ... ¶ Her line was visually flawless. ¶ She baffled criticism because her technique fell into two categories: ballet, which, although impeccably correct, was not classic in style, and Spanish, which was virtuoso in its range but highly unorthodox in form and flavor. She had no wish to perpetuate aesthetic traditions and used only those stock gestures so deeply imbued with emotion as to have become, under her manipulation, original."

"The Nightingale and the Maiden from Enrique Granados's Goyescas" was a dance solo created by Maracci. De Mille writes, "Jerome Robbins described [it] to me as the most beautiful solo dance he had ever seen. In this dance Carmie's castanets made the sound of the bird's song... ."

== Fruits of her creation ==
After touring across America with other troupes, in the 1930s and 1940s she led her own company, nationwide. The distinctive performances that Maracci presented were "a repertory of her own dances". Between Maracci's featured solos, the six other dancers took the stage. Her act was considered top rung by those in the business. In New York City she performed in 1939 at the St. James Theatre on Broadway and in 1946 at Carnegie Hall. In 1951 at the Metropolitan Opera House for Ballet Theatre she staged her choreographic work Circo de España.

"Maracci's dancing was deeply personal and an innovative art form. With fiery, passionate individuality and deep political and social convictions, she created dances inspired by Goya's war drawings, García Lorca's poetry, and Unamuno's philosophy. Her dances could be satirical, witty, or flirtatious; a passionate protest of inhumanity or a celebration of human spirit, a plunge to deepest sorrow or an expression of joy."

Starting in the 1930s, she received press reviews that noted her extraordinary art, e.g., in The Times of London, the Paris-Soir, and the English monthly Dancing Times. In the 1940s John Martin of The New York Times wrote six-column reviews hailing Maracci, recognizing her as "a unique phenomenon".

Maracci also worked as a choreographer for Hollywood films, although with pause and an instinctive reluctance. In 1951 for Charlie Chaplin she contributed to the dance scenes in his Limelight, released in 1952. During the war she was a source for dances in the film Three Caballeros by Walt Disney released in 1944. While "commercially successful" it was for Maracci "personally unsatisfying."

In later years, "her performances, though infrequent, drew lines around the block and enthralled the audiences." Yet "Maracci freely admits that her art was not for the masses." She began rehearsals, but ultimately declined to dance the lead role in the ballet Giselle. She clearly preferred her intimate solos, alternating with the 'individual voices' of her several dancers, accompanied by a chamber ensemble, rather than a large ballet company with a full orchestra. She refused to dance in a Spain ruled by Franco.

Throughout her career, Maracci excelled in fashioning and performing her singular dances, performed solo: Cante Jondo ("Deep Song"), Viva la Madre ("Live for the one who bore you"), Dance of Elegance (a satire, a "caricature of a ballet dancer preening"), La Pasionaria (a radio voice of civil-war Spain, a coal-miner's daughter), Another Goyesca (to a piano suite by Granados about painter Francisco Goya), Carlotta Grisi in Retrospect (about the nineteenth century Italian ballet dancer), The Nightingale and the Maiden (inspired by a poem written in 1500, to music by Granados).

"But unlike those who struggle for immortality, Maracci refused to compromise her sensibilities or her convictions. She turned away from the fame-makers and artist-merchants, often with just scant cause, and generally made herself inaccessible. By choice, she never connected with the major institutions nor lingered for long in the limelight."

She was long acknowledged by admirers in the ballet world for her inner knowledge of the art. In 1985 Robert Joffrey of Joffrey Ballet said of her, "There was, and still is, no one like her. She had incredible strength and supreme delicacy. Her technique was astonishing, perfection itself... ." Maracci was known, according to dance writer Walter Terry, as "one of the major dance figures of our time."

== Mid-career troubles ==
"Although regarded by her peers as one of the leading dancers in the United States... Maracci shrank from the concert stage after two experiences which devastated her." In 1946 a lone drunken heckler in St. Paul, Minnesota, mocked her three dancers. They were on stage doing Maracci's choreographed tribute to the republican loyalists of the Spanish Civil War (1936–1939). She emerged from backstage quite angry, and ordered the curtain pulled down. It terminated the performance, outraged the local theater, and eventually ended the financial backing for her touring shows. The second event concerned the 1951 staging of her choreography Circo de España, for the Ballet Theatre in New York City. Its debut was not considered successful enough by the ballet company, concludeding that it needed work.

During the Spanish Civil War, Maracci had been greatly moved by La Pasionaria, an exceptional woman whose emotional radio oratory championed a Republican faction. Maracci's political views were strongly held; she "wanted to change the world through theater." Yet she probably overreacted in St. Paul. At the theater manager, according to Agnes de Mille, Maracci "let loose... the full extent of her primal rage. She attacked the man personally and all the people of St. Paul." Forty years later, in a private letter, "she still referred to 'the drunken audience jeering at Spanish heroes'."

About her Circo de España at the Metropolitan Opera in New York, Maracci "was told by the famed dancer Agnes de Mille that the ballet was 'no good'." So wrote Jack Jones, a journalist for The Los Angeles Times.

According to de Mille, however, Maracci's performances had fascinated everyone in the ballet company. Yet when staged her brilliant solo dances did not fit well into the larger piece. The New York audience was "puzzled and not a little put off by Carmelita's austere, sardonic personality" and was "tepid in response". Oliver Smith, the co-director of Ballet Theatre, told de Mille it needed work, and to give Maracci a "pep talk" to pull the piece together. In Maracci's dressing room, the pep talk unexpectedly "produced in no time a collapse. She had to be carried out of the theater."

A contrary view was expressed in a speech by dance journalist Donna Perlmutter. Although de Mille harbored an "intense admiration" for Maracci, she also had a "burning... I guess you could call it... jealousy." About the 1951 incident with Ballet Theatre, "Agnes had no small part in this." Maracci had expressly requested dance and theater conditions that were promised, but not delivered. Consequently, she felt that the Circo de España performance "wasn't a ballet but a disaster." Antony Tudor, a resident choreographer with Ballet Theatre, however, afterward made some puzzling remarks. Perlmutter continued. After "reflecting on that April night... " de Mille "says she immediately told Maracci the ballet was no good, and because Maracci was always on the emotional brink, Donald Saddler carried her from the theater shortly thereafter."

"Yes, I was devastated," Maracci admitted. "Agnes can be unbearably cruel. She came to my dressing room like a matador, people on either side of her... . She came to deliver the verdict. She told me that Tudor always says what he doesn't mean, that he meant I'm no good... ."

Beyond the dissimilar views as to how it happened, there are different commentaries on its significance. The journalist Jack Jones writing about it, quotes what later "Maracci said of herself":

"People tell me my unplanned oblivion was a tragedy. ... But I say no. Save that word for human suffering, for wars that kill innocent people, for the devastation of the poor and unwanted, for the corruption and cruelty that cause these things in the world. Mine is no tragedy. If art could relieve misery, I'd gladly sacrifice it."

== Ambivalent reflections ==
Agnes de Mille, her former student, expressed admiration for Maracci. In her book, de Mille describes the paradox of Maracci's career. The New York Times had early "predicted international glory." True, "Carmelita had imagination, verve, energy, and fascination. What she did not have was the ability to cope with the practicalities of her career." At a setback in the late thirties in New York, she had "tongue-lashed all concerned". Collapses often are "contrived to hide flaws" yet her "talent was immaculate". Although managers want reliable clients, "anyone who prefers practical cooperation to genius is a fool." To build a great career, however, takes realistic courage, and a steadfast character; "those with a great gift generally have in their character a certain instinctive protection of the endowment." Here, "Carmie was a tragic exception."

Donna Perlmutter, the Los Angeles journalist who carefully followed her career, quotes Maracci who here is musing on her own inner constellation, on her soul's passage through the arts:

"The terrain I've traveled led me into Goya's land of terror and blood soaked pits... ." Accordingly, "I could not be a dancer of fine dreams and graveyard decor. So I danced hard about what I saw and lived. I was not an absentee landlord. I was one of the dispossessed."

After interviews, especially of her husband Lee Freeson, and years of research, Perlmutter comes to layered conclusions. Her fate had elements of tragedy. The great gifts in the dance arts that she possessed and crafted were enjoyed for the most part by a few hundreds, by knowledgeable people in the City of Los Angeles, rather than by multitudes of aficionados nationwide, worldwide. Yet her fate was born of her character, her compass of principles. Perlmutter from a podium said:

"In literal terms, she Carmelita knew only privilege and doting parents, and never encountered a land of terror and blood soaked pits. Hers was purely a case of identification with its victims, an overt rallying to their cause, an imaginative leap. At its most profound, she tapped a kinship based on interior terror and ravaged spirit."

However hard and durable was her perfectionist spirit, and however vivid her anger at acts of intentional cruelty or political mayhem, she also possessed a corresponding sensitivity for the suffering of the victims of the world. Although this might fuel her artistic expression, it also seemed to cause her vulnerability, her surprising fragility. Perhaps it led her to become overly sensitive, apprehensive before a general audience that likely would be ill-prepared, unsuspecting of her intense emotional charge. On the other hand, it was the very strength of her principles that guided her when she grew and nurtured her art, and appraised the various offers to perform. Carmelita wrote:

"The performing artist is in a difficult position because the buying public doesn't want people who have dissenting opinions to disturb the illusion." "Aridity is the price we pay for fear of listening to the human cry."

After she died of a heart attack her husband had to identify her body at the mortuary. Later he told Agnes de Mille that when he saw her Carmelita "lay like a little girl, at most thirteen or fourteen years old, absolutely pure, incorporeal, weightless, a spirit. He thought she would float from the room. He had seen nothing like it in his life. This was the essence of la Maracci, a born dancer, a great one who had concealed herself, hidden somehow until this moment... ."

== Teaching the ballet arts ==
As a student of Maracci, Allegra Kent developed "a sense of mild rebellion--I became an original dance creature."

"Her reputation attracted students" whether the young or the professional dancer. For Maracci "teaching gave her more autonomy." She had offered instruction in ballet since the 1930s, but it became her focus as she approached her fiftieth year. "Her teaching included politics, poetry, music, and cooking, as a way to nurture the art of dance as an integral part of the student's journey of life." "She lived in a world of people who came to sit at her feet."

Over a teaching career spanning 50 years, among others Maracci taught John Clifford, Gerald Arpino, Joan Bayley, Erik Bruhn, Leslie Caron, William Carter, Charlie Chaplin, Geraldine Chaplin, Joan Chodorow, Janet Collins, Carmen de Lavallade, Agnes de Mille, Paul Godkin, Cynthia Gregory, Allegra Kent, Julie Newmar, Ruth Page, Tommy Rall, Tina Ramirez, Jerome Robbins, Janice Rule, Donald Saddler, Laurie Sibbald, Christine Sarry, and Gwen Verdon. She was a major influence on Los Angeles dance teacher, Irina Kosmovska.

Cynthia Gregory remembers her teaching class "on pointe and wearing pink tights puffing a cigarette, flicking it out the window and dashing off a fast, furious set of pirouettes." "I think that a technique should be subordinated to the idea," Carmelita wrote.

Tina Ramirez, the founder and artistic director of Ballet Hispanico, called Maracci a "fabulous dancer" who could "dance ballet on pointe" as well as she could in a Spanish style. She sought in her teaching to "influence the overall well-being" of her students. In "imaginative ways" Maracci related "the history of dance to that of music." She might say, "And now do an arabesque as if you were standing on top of the world looking down."

Joan Chodorow describes Maraccii as "a great artist and teacher". She writes that when she was a young teenager, circa the late 1950s, she began "intensive studies" with her in Los Angeles.

"[Maracci's] daily classes became the center of my life. She demanded utter dedication from her students and imparted an unusually strong classical ballet technique. But technique was never an end in itself, rather it was necessary to give form to powerful images, to express the heights and depths of human experience. Music, emotion and dance were inseparable. Carmelita's accompanists were usually pianists of concert caliber who played with great feeling. The beauty of the music moved many of her students to tears, so it was not unusual to dance and at the same time weep."

Allegra Kent writes, "As a teacher Carmelita was able to impart and illuminate... the ineffable qualities as well as the technical points of ballet." She treated me as an imaginative child, celebrated my learning, and taught me "that dancing can be a profound experience for the performer and the audience alike." She was generous. "Carmelita showed me that feelings and emotions had to be genuine, not put on like a spangled dress for a party." Dancers listened to the music. "Somewhat like an athlete but also as an artist, we had to paint sound and sculpt rhythm."

"Passionately opinionated, Miss Maracci taught classes with a Socratic tinge, including talk of politics and the other arts of the time. She continued teaching during her last illness by gathering students around her bedside to talk with them of the art of ballet," wrote dance journalist Jennifer Dunning. A longtime student remarked, "Every class of hers was really a performance."

A centennial event celebrating Maracci's birth was held on September 28, 2008, in Los Angeles.

== Bibliography ==
Primary

- Agnes de Mille, "Carmelita Maracci" chapter in Portrait Gallery. Artists, impresarios, intimates (Boston: Houghton Mifflin 1990).
- Jennifer Dunning, "Carmelita Maracci, a Ballet Instructor and Choreographer", Obituary, The New York Times, August 3, 1987.
- Jack Jones, "Carmelita Maracci, the Dancers' Dancer, Dies", The Los Angeles Times, July 30, 1987.
- Allegra Kent, "Carmelita Maracci" in Dance Magazine, January 1, 2001, at The Free Library (website).
- Elspeth Kuang, "Carmelita Maracci" in Susan Ware and Stacy Braukman, editors, Notable American Women. A biographical dictionary. Completing the twentieth century, volume 5 (Harvard University 2005).
- Carmelita Maracci, "The Portrait--the Individual Voice" in Impulse 1961. The Annual of Contemporary Dance.
- Donna Perlmutter, "A Legend's 'Unplanned Oblivion'," in The Los Angeles Times, April 21, 1985.
- Nancy Reynolds, "Carmelita Maracci" in Selma Cohen, editor, The International Encyclopedia of Dance (Oxford University 1998).
- Jane Wollman Rusoff, "Celebrating Carmelita Maracci, who 'took the girdle off ballet'", The New York Times, May 22, 2017.
  - Carmelita Maracci Papers (website).
  - Carmelita Maracci (website).
  - Joan Bayley (website).

Secondary

- Ángel Alvarez Caballero, El cante flamenco (Madrid: Alianza Editorial 1994, 1998).
- Robert F. Amove, Talent Abounds. Profiles of master teachers and peak performers (New York: Rutledge 2009).
- Michael Bernal, The Golden Age of Spanish Dancing (Las Vegas: Lulu 2020).
- Manuel de Falla, El 'Cante Jondo' {Canto primitivo andaluz} (Granada: Editorial Urania 1922).
- Agnes de Mille, The book of the Dance (London: Paul Hamlyn 1963),
- Agnes de Mille, America Dances. A personal chronicle, in words and pictures (New York: Macmillan 1980).
- Lynn Garafola, Diaghilev's Ballets Russes (Oxford University 1989).
- Naomi Jackson, Converging Movements. Modern Dance and Jewish Culture at the 92nd Street Y (Wesleyan University 2000).
- Léonide Massine, My Life in Ballet (London: Macmillan 1968).
- Eduardo Molina Fajardo, Manuel de Falla y El 'Cante Jondo' (Universidad de Granada 1962, 2d ed. 1998).
- Nancy Reynolds & Malcolm McCormick, No Fixed Points. Dance in the twentieth century (Yale University Press 2003).
- Mary Ellen Snodgrass, The Encyclopedia of World Ballet (Rowman and Littlefield 2015).
