= Carlos Calderón =

Carlos Calderón may refer to:

- Carlos Calderón (boxer) (born 1955), Puerto Rican boxer
- Carlos Calderón (fencer) (born 1947), Mexican Olympic fencer
- Carlos Calderón (Ecuadorian footballer) (born 1959), Ecuadorian manager and former defender
- Carlos Calderón (footballer, 1934-2012), Mexican football forward
- Carlos Calderón (footballer, born 1943), Mexican football midfielder
- Carlos Calderón (Salvadoran footballer) (born 1986), Salvadoran football forward
- Carlos Calderón (Spanish footballer) (born 1995), Spanish football winger
- Carlos Calderón Fajardo (1946–2015), Peruvian journalist
