= Discrimination in dance =

Unequal treatment of performance artists

Discrimination in dance refers to unequal treatment of performance artists based on white dominant culturally desired symmetry and unified lines.

== Trailblazing black ballerinas ==
=== Raven Wilkinson ===
Widely known as the mentor of Misty Copeland, Raven Wilkinson was the first African-American woman to break the racial barrier in ballet in 1955 and become a principal dancer. Wilkinson auditioned at Swoboda's School of Dance multiple times, but was never picked in auditions. One of her fellow dancers told her, “Raven, they can’t afford to take you because of your race.” Nevertheless, eventually Raven was accepted into the school and began her journey to be the first famous black ballerina. While travelling with the Ballet Russe in the 1950s, Wilkinson faced extreme discrimination in the southern states of the United States. She was refused the right to stay at the same hotel as her company and was sent home for her safety until the company moved north again. The Ku Klux Klan had interrupted her performances to protest against the famous Black ballerina.

Wilkinson was told to put powder on her face to look paler and even told to tell people that she was Mexican and not Black, which were all racist attempts at concealing her skin color from the dance world. Wilkinson saw Misty Copeland dancing on television and knew she had to mentor her. Copeland commented on Wilkinson, “We speak the same very rare language: that of a black classical ballet dancer.”

=== Misty Copeland ===
Misty Copeland is highly regarded as one of the most influential and powerful dancers of the modern age. Copeland was the first black ballerina to be a principal dancer with the American Ballet Theatre. She joined the ABT Studio Company in September 2000, then joined as a soloist in August 2007. Eventually, she was promoted to principal dancer in August 2015.

Copeland is more than a ballerina, as she has used her platform to speak out about racism in ballet. In collaboration with her manager Gilda Squire, she wrote, “She and I have a shared goal to bring ballet to more people and diversify it. That’s been my goal from day one, and it has never wavered.” Copeland's primary goal is to educate and inspire young people about the racism that has been embedded ballet since it was invented. As a modern-day black dancer, she still remembers being told to pancake her skin a lighter color to fit in with the rest of the company. She has relied on her mentor and longtime friend, Raven Wilkinson, to highlight the injustices of ballet and was moved by how Wilkinson overcame her struggles as one of very few, black dancers to dance with a major touring troupe. Both dancers were told to pancake their skin to appear lighter than they were, revealing an unsettling lack of advancement towards accepting dancers of color within the last 70 years.

== Racist practices in ballet ==
Ballet is an art form in which balance, unity and perfection are valued above creativity and uniqueness. This idea of a cohesive and unison line of dancers has led to discrimination within the ballet community. Similar heights and leg lengths have historically been important to dance companies, and this ideal is being spread to race as well. Companies desire dancers who all have the same body shape and features to create a cohesive look. For example, in the 1950s, ballet companies wanted women with long arms and legs like Galina Ulanova; in the 1960s, under the influence of George Balanchine, they wanted women with long necks and small heads, like Suzanne Farrell; in the 1980s, they wanted women to be extremely thin. More recently, ballet companies have wanted ballerinas to have athletic, muscular bodies like Misty Copeland. Some ballet directors believe that most dancers of color have “unsuitable features”, such as curvy bodies with larger breasts and buttocks, flat feet and differing hair textures. This has led to discrimination and racism against Black ballerinas, as they do not fit the profile that casting directors desire.

Some ballet companies continue to use blackface and yellowface to depict people of color, instead of casting people of color, in order to keep the symmetry and similar lines within the dance.

=== Leotards and pointe shoes ===
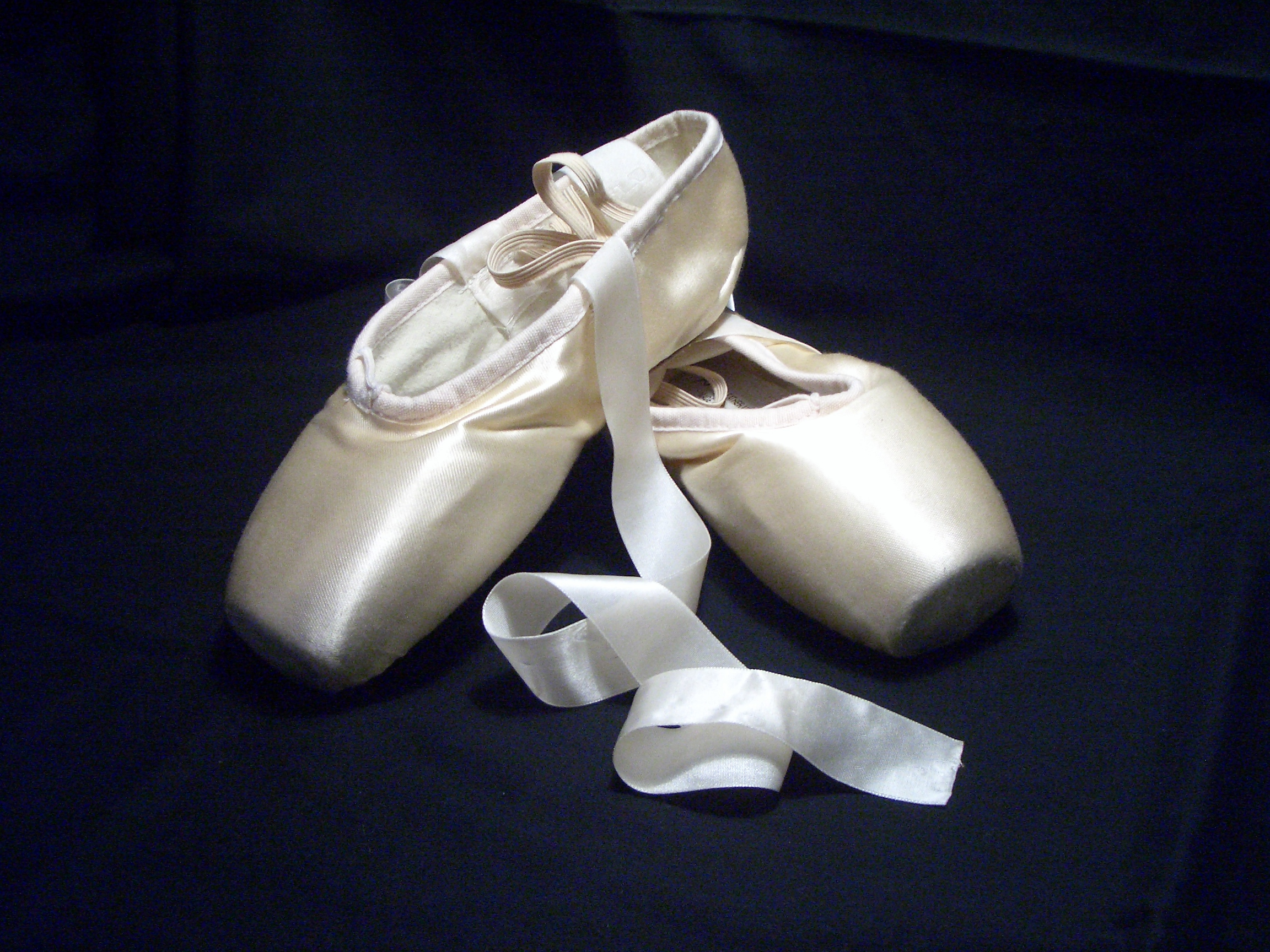
pointe shoes

Within ballet, similar leotards, tights and shoes are worn to maintain the desired uniform image. Historically, tights and shoes have been light pink to match the desired light skin tone. Retail companies did not sell other colors for dancers with different colored legs or feet, so ballet companies encouraged ballerinas of color to wear the light pink tights to make their legs lighter and blend in with the group. Furthermore, ballerinas of color have had to “pancake” their shoes, tights and leotards to match their skin tones. The Dance Theater of Harlem has historically encouraged a variety of races and colors within their company as a diverse line is the image they are looking for. Dancer Llanchie Stevenon performed for the company and pushed for the idea of different skin colored tights as her legs were a completely different color than her arms. Stevenson and the theater debuted their flesh-toned tights in 1974 on their European tour. Today, companies are still debating the idea of flesh-toned tights as some directors believe diversity in tights is okay when there is lots of diversity, but when there is only one or two dancers of color, companies believe they should continue to use the pink tights to not “break the line."

“Pancaking” ballet materials has led to an increase in cost for ballerinas of color. They have to purchase not only the base materials but also a skin colored paint to pack on to their clothes to achieve the skin tone look. This economic discrimination discourages dancers of color from investing in the dance style as they have to spend more money and time to achieve to what lighter skinned dancers is the bare minimum. In 2017, Gaynor Minden, a popular point shoe brand, debuted their first point shoes of different colors to match multiple skin tones.

== Court cases ==
=== EEOC v. Danny's Restaurant, LLC ===
In June 2013, Danny's Cabaret, a strip club in the entertainment district of Jackson, Mississippi, was sued for discriminating against their Black dancers by limiting their hours and requiring them to compete for the “black shift”. White dancers were offered ample shifts while the black dancers had to compete for one which limited their income. One of the dancers filed a complaint against Danny's with the Equal Employment Opportunity Commission but Danny's did not respond well and consequently limited their hours even more, fining them, and demanding they quit. Danny's was found liable of discrimination and had to change their ways by way of a supervisor and implementing posters for two years which warns customers of their history of discrimination based on race.

Similarly, in March 2017, a very similar situation occurred again in which Danny's was limiting shifts, advertisement campaigns, and opportunities to black dancers due to their race. They once again were fined, given a supervisor and put up warnings of their business habits. Once again, in May 2019, Danny's Cabaret was discriminated against by race to black dancers. As well as limiting their shifts, Danny attempted to get all the black dancers to work at another club called the Black Diamond. It was illegal for the dancers to work at the Diamond because they did not have the permits. The diamond also had less favorable conditions like less security, and worse pay. When the dancers advocated for their right to work at Danny's under equal opportunities and conditions, Danny's fined them and sent them home.

== Important moments in black dance history ==
=== 1931 ===
- Ballet Nègre founded, one of the first black ballet companies in the US

=== 1937 ===
- American Negro Ballet gives its debut performance.
- Ballet blended with Harlem dance techniques composed of 20 black dancers.

=== 1951 ===
- Black dancer Janet Collins made metropolitan opera debut in the opera Aida.

=== 1955 ===
- Raven Wilkinson became the first African American women to receive contract to dance full-time with Ballet Russe de Monte Carlo of NYC

=== 1957 ===
- Arthur Mitchell was the first black principal dancer in the history of NYC ballet

=== 1958 ===
- Alvin Ailey founded the Alvin Ailey American Dance Theater, enriched the modern dance heritage and preserved the uniqueness of African America cultural experience

=== 1964 ===
- Tony Williams joined Boston Ballet and became principal dancer within three years.
- He later founded the urban nutcracker which incorporates black artist music along with hip hop and tap, not otherwise associated with ballet

== See also ==
- Chloe Arnold
- Josephine Baker
- Sammy Davis Jr.
- Gregory Hines
- Bill Robinson
- Black women in ballet
