= Black women in ballet =

Black women have been traditionally underrepresented in ballet. In the 15th and 16th centuries, ballet began in Italian Renaissance courts, where it was largely dominated and influenced by the aristocracy. Ballet later spread to France and was developed under Louis XIV. After the first professional theatrical ballet company, the Paris Opera Ballet, was established in 1669, ballet spread throughout Europe and the rest of the world. Ballet eventually arrived in the United States, and by 1933, the San Francisco Ballet, the first professional ballet company in the United States, was founded.

When ballet came to the United States, the demographic makeup of dancers was predominantly wealthy and white. However, ballet has grown increasingly diverse in recent years, as professional ballet companies have increased representation of dancers of color. Specific companies aiming to nurture Black ballet dancers and foster diversity have been established, including Alvin Ailey American Dance Theater, Dance Theater of Harlem, and Alonzo King LINES Ballet. Initiatives such as Project Plié, started by the American Ballet Theatre (ABT), also aim to tackle diversity issues in ballet by broadening access to dance education for children of color, increasing diversity in dance administrative positions, and working in partnership with other professional ballet companies as well as Boys & Girls Clubs of America.

== Historical evolution of Black women in ballet ==
Although Black women continue to be underrepresented in ballet, they have made steady progress in integrating the field. Jim Crow laws, which persisted until the signing of the Civil Rights Act of 1964, meant that racial segregation was a pervasive feature of American life throughout the first half of the 20th century. Segregation marked nearly every American institution, including ballet schools and companies. Aspiring Black ballet students were prohibited from entry in ballet classes because of the color of their skin. Janet Collins, who later became the first African American prima ballerina, attempted to take ballet classes as a child but was denied, so she opted for private instruction instead. Collins excelled in her technique, but she quickly realized that her skin color would prevent her from performing with most companies. In 1932, when she was fifteen years old, Collins auditioned for Ballet Russe de Monte Carlo and was told that she would need to perform in whiteface if she became a member of the company. Raven Wilkinson, another prominent ballet dancer, faced similar discrimination when she performed with Ballet Russe de Monte Carlo several decades later, in the 1950s. Wilkinson was instructed to use powder on her face so that she would appear white onstage and audiences would not be able to tell that she was Black. Wilkinson eventually left the company after being threatened by the Ku Klux Klan while on tour in the South.

The exclusion of Black ballet dancers from existing schools and companies and the discrimination they faced if they were admitted led to the establishment of Black ballet institutions. In 1919, Ella Gordan founded Gordan's School of Dance in Harlem, New York, to train the younger generation of Black dancers. Several years later, in 1926, Essie Marie Dorsey established the Essie Marie Dorsey School of Dancing in Philadelphia. Both Gordan and Dorsey contributed significantly to Black participation in ballet through the establishment of their respective schools.

The foundation of ballet schools in Black communities was important for the training of younger generations of dancers. Similarly, the establishment of Black ballet companies was essential for professional dancers to choreograph and perform. Katherine Dunham was a significant contributor to the involvement of Black women in ballet. In 1931, Dunham helped establish Ballet Négre, which was one of the first Black ballet companies in the United States. Though the group quickly disbanded, it was an important precursor to the establishment of other Black ballet companies. Dunham later founded her several schools and her own company, and she developed a dance training method called the Dunham Technique.

As the Jim Crow era came to an end and more ballet companies began to integrate, the number of Black professional dancers and students at prominent ballet schools and companies has increased. Throughout the years, there has been much progress in the number and status of Black women in ballet, but they still face discrimination and underrepresentation.

== Notable Black ballerinas ==
- Aesha Ash is the first Black woman on the School of American Ballet's permanent faculty. Ash was a student at SAB and progressed into its affiliated company, the New York City Ballet, in 1996. She left NYCB and joined Maurice Béjart's company in Switzerland before returning to the United States and dancing with Alonzo King LINES Ballet and Christopher Wheeldon's Morphoses. After she stopped performing, Ash worked to address stereotypes faced by Black women by establishing the Swan Dreams Project in 2011. In 2015, Ash was a founding member of SAB's diversity committee, and she served as the school's visiting faculty chair from 2018 to 2020. She then joined the permanent faculty, now serving as an instructor and mentor to young ballet students.
- Janet Collins became the first African American prima ballerina in 1952, one year after she joined the corps de ballet of the Metropolitan Opera Ballet. As she worked to break color barriers in ballet, Collins faced racism and discrimination. For example, she was told that she would have to perform in whiteface if she joined the Ballet Russe de Monte Carlo, and she was prevented from going onstage while on tour with the Metropolitan Opera due to race laws in the South. Nonetheless, when Collins began performing in leading roles in New York, other ballet companies started to integrate. Collins eventually toured solo in the United States and Canada and taught at the School of American Ballet, San Francisco Ballet School, and the Harkness House.
- Misty Copeland was the first African American female ballet dancer to be promoted to principal at the American Ballet Theatre. Copeland became a member of ABT's Studio Company in 2000 and began performing with the full company in 2001. She was promoted to soloist in 2007, and in 2015 she was promoted to principal. Copeland received a significant amount of media attention for her promotion, as it was the first time ABT had an African American female principal dancer in its 75-year history, and it had been 18 years since ABT promoted its first African American male principal dancer, Desmond Richardson, in 1997. Copeland has received several awards for her performances and contributions, and she was named to Time magazine's Time 100 in 2015. She is the author of Life in Motion, Firebird, and Ballerina Body.
- Michaela DePrince was a second soloist with Boston Ballet, which she joined in September 2021. From 2013 to 2021, DePrince was a member of Dutch National Ballet; she began performing as a soloist with DNB in 2016 and was the company's only female dancer of color. DePrince lived as an orphan in the midst of the Sierra Leone Civil War before being adopted and moving to America at the age of five. DePrince rose to fame after being featured in First Position, a ballet documentary. She is outspoken about her encounters with racism as a ballet dancer and has discussed her experiences living through the civil war in Sierra Leone. DePrince is the author of Taking Flight, which tells the story of her childhood in Sierra Leone. DePrince unexpectedly passed at the age of 29 on September 10, 2024.
- Katherine Dunham was revolutionary in her incorporation of traditional Black ethnic dance into her choreography in the 1930s. Dunham developed the Dunham Technique, which combined ballet with Caribbean, African, and African American influences and is still widely used today. Dunham established several dance schools and founded the Katherine Dunham Dance group, which became the Katherine Dunham Company. In addition to her choreographic and pedagogical contributions, Dunham appeared in several films and authored several books, including Journey to Accompong, Las Danzas de Haiti, A Touch of Innocence, and others. Dunham was outspoken about racial equality and worked to raise awareness about issues in Haiti. She received many awards for her contributions, including the Presidential Medal of Arts, NAACP Lifetime Achievement Award, and The Kennedy Center Honors, among others.
- Ella Gordon founded Gordan's School of Dance in 1919 in Harlem, New York. Gordan brought ballet to Harlem, teaching dancers who continued her legacy of ballet training. One of Gordan's students was Ruth Williams, who went on to perform with the Dance Theater of Harlem.
- Charlotte Nebres is a young dancer at the School of American Ballet. In 2019, Nebres performed as the first Black Marie with the New York City Ballet in George Balanchine's "The Nutcracker". This was a historic moment for the production, which was first performed in 1954.
- Anne Benna Sims was the first African American female dancer with the American Ballet Theatre, which she joined in 1978. Before her contract with ABT, Sims performed with Les Grands Ballets Canadiens, Geneva Opera Ballet, Frankfurt Opera Ballet, and Eglevsky Ballet
- Raven Wilkinson became the first African American female ballet dancer to perform with a major touring troupe when she danced with Ballet Russe de Monte Carlo in the 1950s. In the South at this time, there were laws prohibiting Black and white dancers from sharing a stage, so Wilkinson risked her life and her freedom by performing. While on tour in Montgomery, Alabama, Wilkinson was threatened by the Ku Klux Klan, which led her to leave Ballet Russe de Monte Carlo. She later performed with Dutch National Ballet and the New York City Opera, and she now serves as a mentor to other dancers, including Misty Copeland.
