= Mario Testino =

Peruvian fashion and portrait photographer (born 1954)

Mario Testino OBE
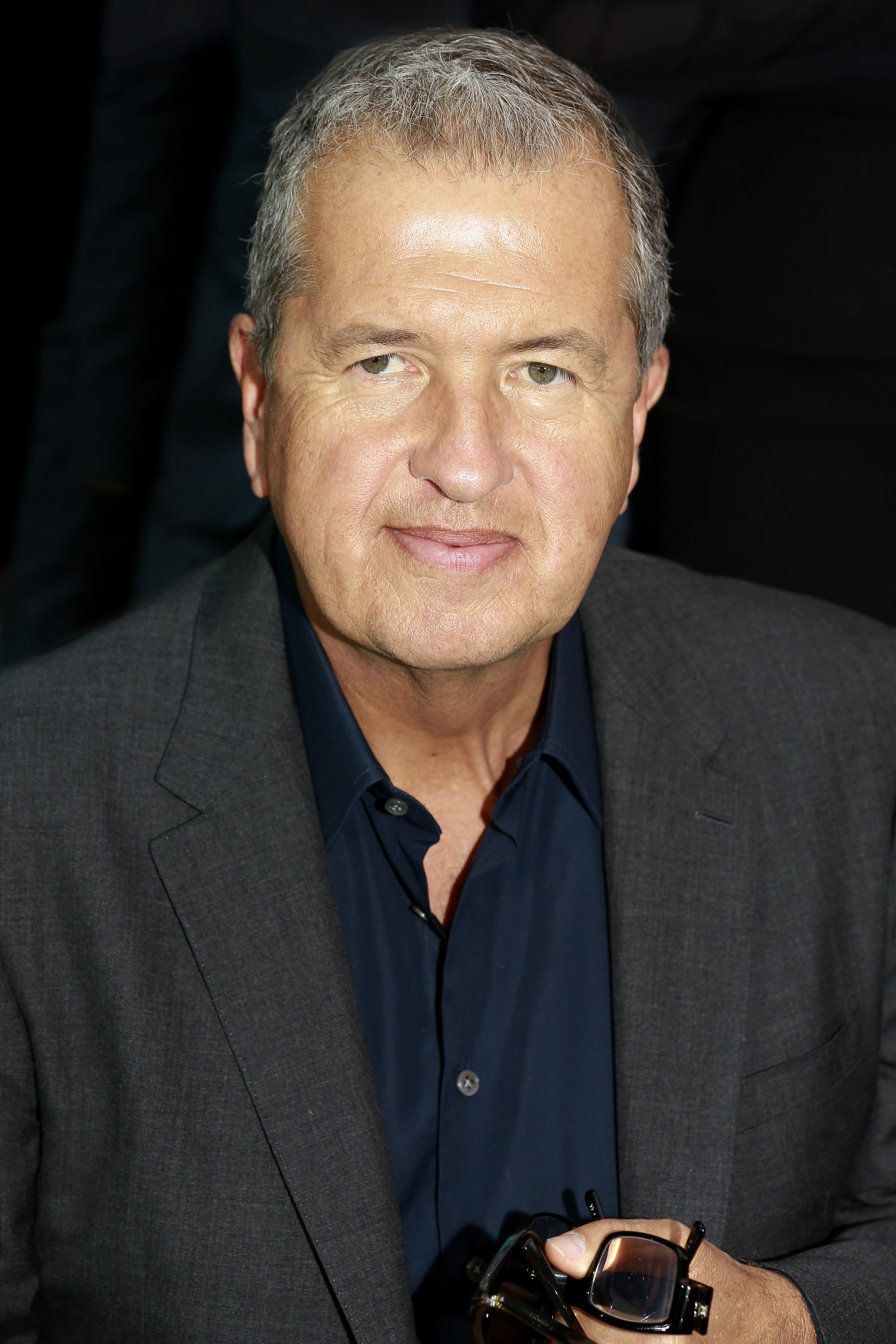
- Testino in 2014
- Born: Mario Eduardo Testino Silva; 30 October 1954 (age 71); Lima, Peru
- Education: Universidad del Pacífico; Pontificia Universidad Catolica del Peru; University of San Diego; (attended)
- Known for: Photographer
- Website: mariotestino.com

Mario Eduardo Testino Silva OBE HonFRPS (born 30 October 1954) is a Peruvian fashion and portrait photographer.

His work has featured internationally in magazines such as Vogue, V Magazine, Vanity Fair and GQ. He has also created images for brands such as Gucci, Burberry, Versace, Michael Kors, Chanel, Stuart Weitzman, Carolina Herrera and Estée Lauder. Alongside his practice as a photographer, Testino has also worked as a creative director, guest editor, museum founder, art collector and collaborator, and entrepreneur. His professional work as a photographer has been dogged by numerous accusations of sexual harassment and assault, including from his subjects.

== Early life ==
Testino was born and grew up in Lima into a well-to-do Roman Catholic family. He was the eldest of six children and is of Spanish, Italian, and Irish descent. He attended a Catholic school, Santa Maria Marianistas. As a child he wanted to be a priest.

Testino studied economics at La Universidad del Pacífico followed by the Pontificia Universidad Catolica del Peru and the University of San Diego.

In 1976, he went to London to study photography after abandoning his studies of economics, Law and International Affairs. It was during apprenticeships at the studios of John Vickers and Paul Nugent that he made his first attempts as a photographer. Living in a humble shared house that had been converted from a hospital, without much money, he funded himself by working as a waiter. He had his hair dyed pink which helped him get noticed as a photographer and took inspiration from British celebrity fashion photographer Cecil Beaton. London was the city that allowed him to flourish expressively without the restrictions he felt were imposed on him in Peru.

His work first appeared in Vogue in 1983.

During the early 1990s, Testino looked to his childhood growing up in Peru and his teenage summers in Brazil for inspiration, which helped him to shape his photographic language.

== Career ==
Testino has become one of the world's best-known and most celebrated fashion photographers. He has documented subjects from A-list stars, musicians, supermodels and artists as well as subjects he has encountered throughout his travels. His work has been featured in magazines such as Vogue, V Magazine, Vanity Fair, GQ, LOVE, Allure and VMan. Eighteen exhibitions and more than 16 books have been published on his work. Suzy Menkes, Vogue's International Editor explains, "Testino's skill is first and foremost to catch the moment and to bring out the humanity in his subjects".

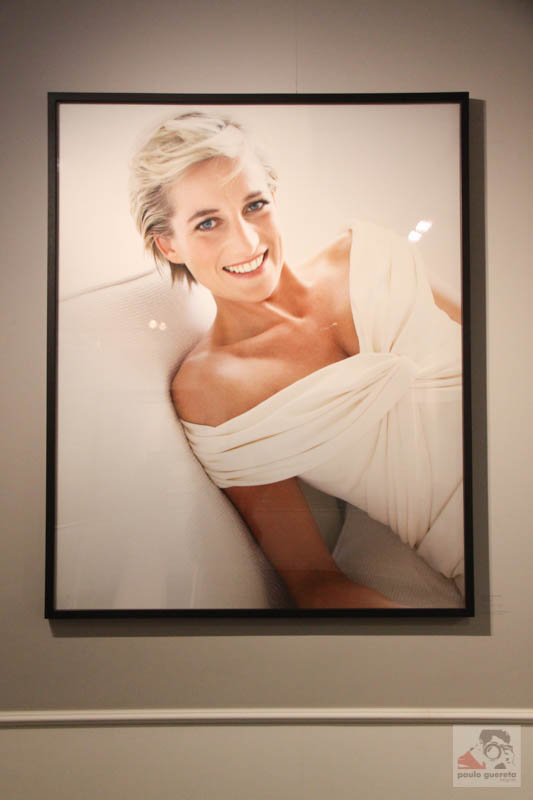
Testino's portrait of Diana, Princess of Wales, 1997

Some of Testino's most recognizable work derives from his portraits of royals, most famously, his series with Diana, Princess of Wales in 1997. Commissioned for Vanity Fair he said: "[Diana] opened a door for me because I then started photographing the royal families of Europe extensively ... this brings out my love for tradition, for a way of showing family and the longevity of people". Testino was also the official photographer for portraits of the Duke and Duchess of Cambridge on the occasion of their engagement in December 2010. In July 2015, he took the official photographs of the British royal family after Princess Charlotte of Cambridge's christening at Sandringham Estate. He has photographed many other royal families in a similar fashion.

Testino's collaboration with Tom Ford and fashion stylist Carine Roitfeld on provocative advertising campaigns in the mid-1990s is widely credited to have led to the revival of Gucci as a major fashion house.

Anna Wintour, editor-in-chief of American Vogue stated that "Fashion photography is this uneasy mix of art and commerce and I think nobody understands this better than Mario".

Testino started the ‘Towel Series’ on his Instagram account in 2013, featuring influential people, including musicians, actors and models wearing only towels. The series became widely replicated by his followers on the social platform and highly in demand among celebrities.

Testino was nicknamed the "John Singer Sargent of our times" by Terence Pepper, photography curator at the National Portrait Gallery in London. The Gallery's 2002 Portraits exhibition attracted more visitors than any other show in the museum's history at the time. For ten years it had the highest attendance of any exhibition ever to be held there. Over the next four years the exhibition toured globally. Testino's work has been exhibited in museums around the world, including the Helmut Newton Foundation in Berlin (Undressed, 2017) the Shanghai Art Museum (Private View, 2012) and the National Portrait Gallery in London (Portraits, 2002)

More than 17 books of his photography have been published, including Ciao, Sir, MaRIO DE JANEIRO Testino, and Kate Moss by Mario Testino, all published by TASCHEN; as well as Alta Moda and Pasito a Paso, published by Museo MATE

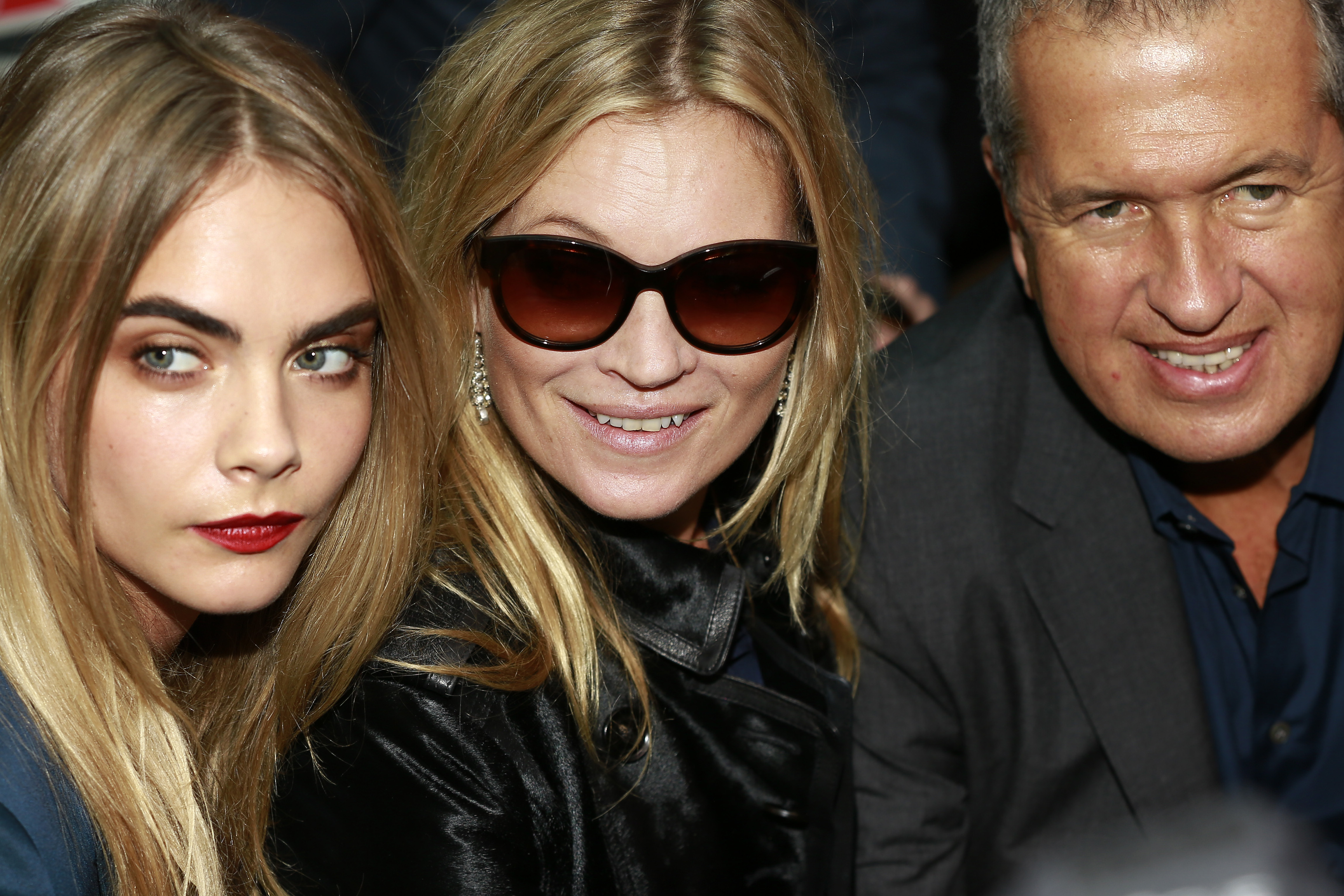
Testino with Kate Moss and Cara Delevingne at Burberry SS15 show, 2014

Testino's personal art collection has been the subject of two exhibitions. The first, Somos Libres in 2013 was at MATE – Museo Mario Testino – in Lima, Peru. The second installation in 2014, Somos Libres II took place at the Pinacoteca Giovanni e Marella Agnelli in Turin, Italy. His relationship with fine art developed through frequent visits to galleries and artists studios, and he has collaborated to create works with artists such as Keith Haring, Vik Muniz, John Currin and Julian Schnabel.

Testino was presented with an honorary OBE on 14 January 2014 by UK Culture Minister Ed Vaizey in recognition of his career and charity work.

In 2011, he was awarded an Honorary Fellowship by The Royal Photographic Society. These are awarded to distinguished persons having, from their position or attainments, an intimate connection with the science or fine art of photography or the application thereof. In this same year GQ also awarded Testino the Man of the Year Inspiration Award.

In Latin America, he has been awarded The Grand Cross rank of the Order of Merit for Distinguished Service in Peru (25 May 2010) and The Tiradentes Medal in Brazil (2007).

Within the fashion and entertainment industry, he received the Walpole Ward for services to the luxury industry (2009), the Rodeo Drive Walk of Style Award (2005) and the British Style Award (2003).

=== Works and exhibitions ===
See: List of works and exhibitions by Mario Testino

== Sexual assault and harassment accusations ==
In January 2018, The New York Times published an article in which Testino was accused by 13 male assistants and models who worked with him of sexual harassment, exploitation, and assault. Models Roman Barrett, Jason Fedele and Ryan Locke complained about his behaviour during campaigns in the 1990s. Subsequent to the allegations (which extended to photographer Bruce Weber's conduct) Condé Nast announced they "will not be commissioning any new work with them for the foreseeable future."

Further allegations were reported by The New York Times against Testino on 3 March 2018. Four of the five new allegations described their incidents occurring during or after 2010. Testino has denied all allegations. The total number of people publicly accusing Testino of sexual assault rose to 18.

In 2024, actor Alan Ritchson claimed that while seated next to Testino during a Paris Fashion Week Atelier Versace VIP dinner in January 2014, "He wouldn't keep his hands off me." Ritchson told The Hollywood Reporter, "The entire time we were sitting at dinner, he was trying to rub my crotch under the table. I was like, 'Get your hands off me, dude. I lived that life with people like you where you feel like you can just have anybody. I'm not an object to you. I'm way past that now, dude.' But he was entertained by it. He thought it was the funniest thing." Ritchson says, adding that Testino went so far as to offer him a cover of Vogue if he slept with him that night.

== Philanthropy ==
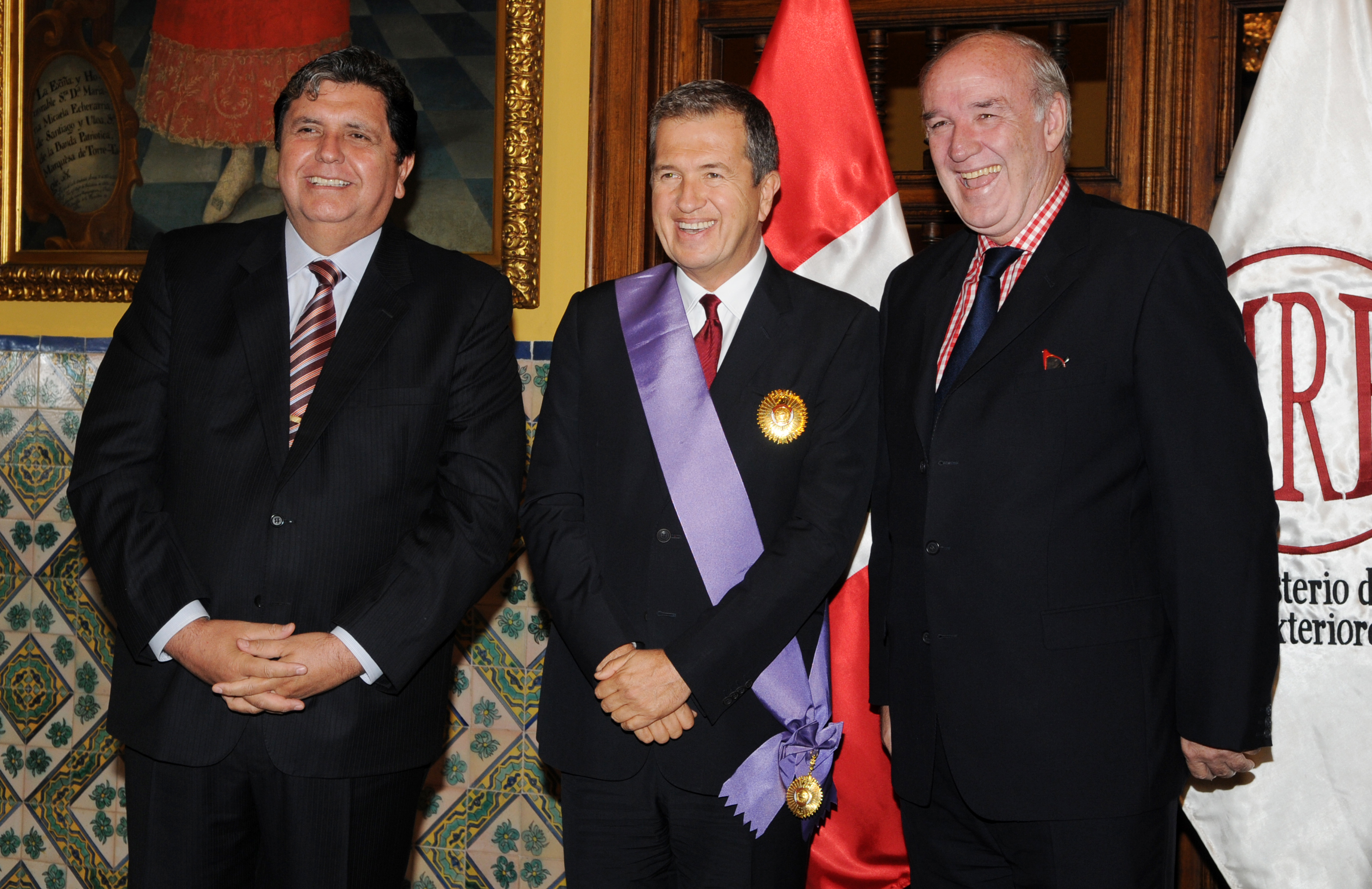
Testino in the presence of then President of Peru, Alan García Pérez, the Foreign Minister José Antonio García Belaúnde at the Order of Merit for Distinguished Services, 2010

Testino has been honoured for his contributions to many non-profit causes and charitable organizations through various awards and recognitions. In 2010, he was appointed one of the highest honours in his native country, The Grand Cross Order of Merit in Peru, and became President of the Board of World Monuments Fund Peru in 2014.

In his role as a Save the Children ambassador he helped to raise funds to build the El Salvador Clinic in the Pueblo Nuevo District, Chincha in his native Peru. The clinic was built for children with tuberculosis in the area badly affected by the devastating earthquake, which hit the coast of Peru in August 2007. The El Salvador Clinic was entirely funded from the sale of a single print from his portraits of Princess Diana, auctioned for £100,000.

He helped to raise funds for Natalia Vodianova's Naked Heart Foundation to build a playground in a Moscow children's hospital specializing in cancer. It is a cause close to his heart since his brother died from the disease at the age of 10.

In 2012, Testino opened his first non-profit association in Lima, the Asociación Mario Testino (MATE). Museo Mario Testino was established to act as a dynamic platform for Peruvian art through the cultivation and promotion of culture and heritage.

== Recognition and awards ==
Year	Award or event	Notes	Location
2017	Chevalier de la Légion d'Honneur	for services to culture, French residences	Lima, Peru
2016	Clio Fashion & Beauty Lifetime Achievement Award	57th Annual Award Show	New York City
2016	Business of Fashion Global VOICES Award	for outstanding achievement in fashion and exemplary impact on the wider world, Business of Fashion VOICES	Oxfordshire, UK
2015	International Center of Photography Infinity Award	Special Presentation	New York City
2014	Honorary Officer of the Order of the British Empire	in recognition of services to photography and charity	London, UK
2014	Best Photographer in the World Award	Spanish Vogue	Madrid, Spain
2012	AmfAR Inspiration Award		São Paulo, Brazil
2011	British GQ Man of the Year	Inspiration Award	London, UK
2011	El Museo del Barrio Lifetime Achievement Award		New York City
2011	Honorary Fellowship of The Royal Photographic Society		Bath, UK
2011	Moët & Chandon Étoile Award		London, UK
2011	Queen Sofía Spanish Institute Gold Medal		New York City
2010	The Grand Cross rank of the Order of Merit for Distinguished Service in Peru		Lima, Peru
2009	Walpole Award for services to the luxury industry		London, UK
2008	ASME National Magazine Award	“Best Fashion Cover” for the September 2007 edition of Vanity Fair	New York City
2008	Commitment Award	United Nations and Women Together	New York City
2008	Hero Award	Aid for Aids	New York City
2007	The Tiradentes Medal		Rio de Janeiro, Brazil
2005	Rodeo Drive Walk of Style Award		Los Angeles, California
2004	Doctor Emeritus of the University of the Arts London		London, UK
2003	British Style Award		London, UK
2003	Elle Style Award		London, UK
