= Norma Gould =

American dancer, dance educator and choreographer

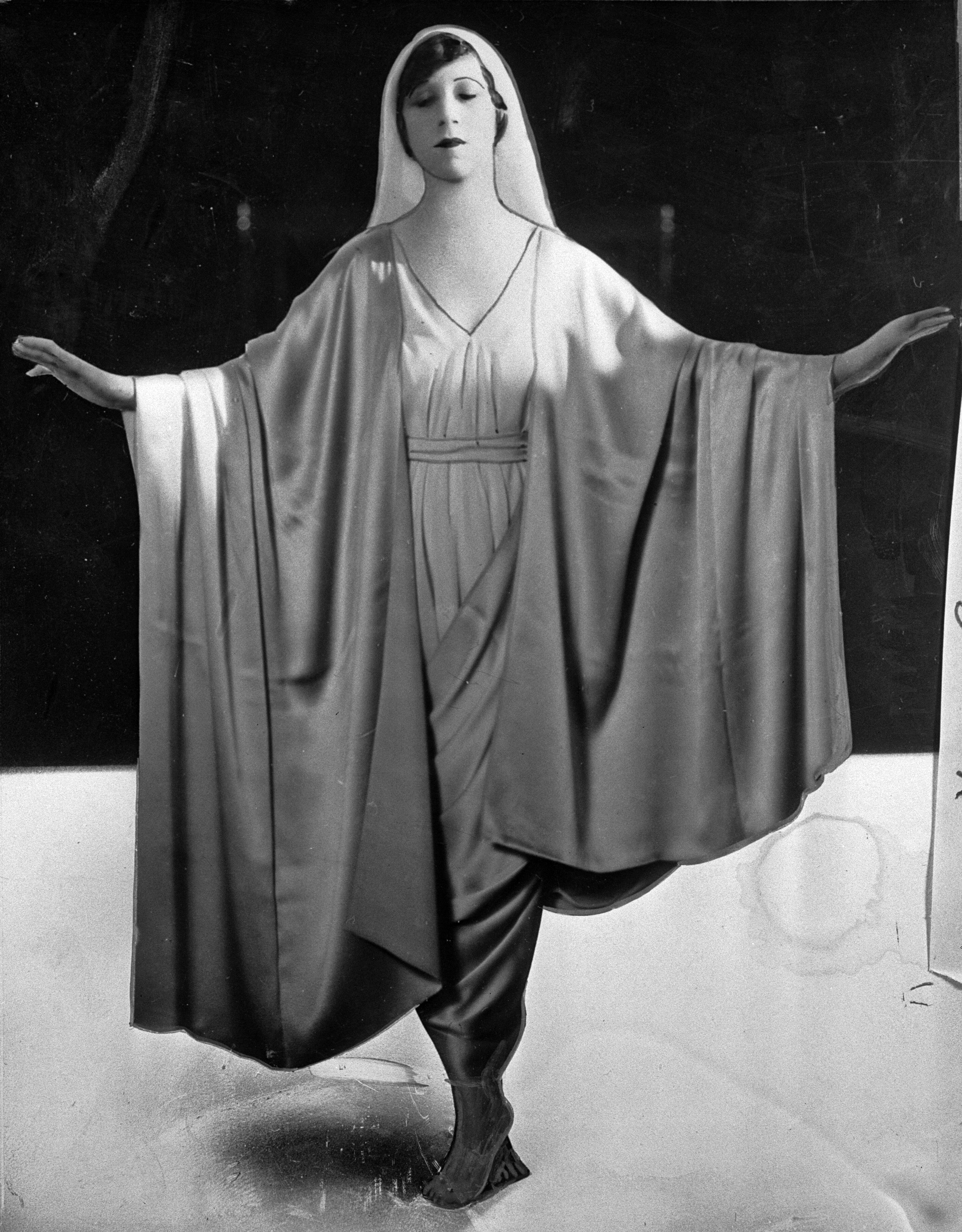
- Gould in 1935
- Born: 1888; Los Angeles, California
- Died: July 30, 1980 (aged 91–92); Santa Monica, California
- Occupations: Dancer, dance educator, choreographer

Norma Gould (1888 – July 30, 1980) was an American dancer, dance educator, and choreographer.

== Early life ==
Norma Gould was born in Los Angeles, California, the daughter of Murray A. Gould. She attended Los Angeles Polytechnical High School, graduating in 1908, and during summers studied dance in New York City.

== Career ==
Gould danced with Ted Shawn from 1911 to 1914, while he was based in Los Angeles. The pair made a short film for Edison, The Dance of the Ages (1913). They traveled to New York together in 1914, but their personal and professional partnership soon dissolved; Shawn joined Ruth St. Denis, and Gould returned to Los Angeles. In 1915 she toured the American South with the Don Philippini Symphony Band. She worked with large groups of dancers in Los Angeles, during and after World War I, creating events for outdoor celebrations and club entertainments, including the opening of the Ventura Bathhouse and Auditorium in 1918. Showgirl Dorothy Knapp was a Norma Gould dancer in this period, as were dancer Dorothy Lyndall, model Bertha Wardell, and actress Ruth Wilton. Dancer Gower Champion also trained with Gould in his youth, as did actress Anita Reynolds.

Gould and her dancers appeared through the 1920s in shows and concerts, including appearances at the Hollywood Bowl in 1927, 1928, and 1929. Her dance compositions included The Fern Fantasy (1919), Dianidra (1921), Shepherd of Shiraz (1928), The Twilight of the Gods (1929), and Lenox Avenue (1938).

Gould was affiliated with the University of California, Los Angeles and with the University of Southern California, teaching in the physical education programs while directing campus pageants. She founded the Dance Theater in 1932, and oversaw its diverse program of classes and performances through 1942. "Miss Gould is perhaps the best known exponent of dramatic and aesthetic dancing on the Pacific Coast," commented one California newspaper in 1931.

== Personal life ==
Gould died in a nursing home in Santa Monica, California, after many years of dementia, in 1980, in her nineties.
