= Dorothy Lyndall =

American dancer and dance educator

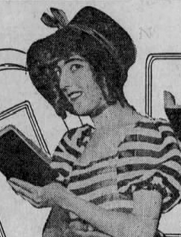
- Dorothy Lyndall in a bonnet and striped costume, from a 1916 newspaper.
- Born: May 4, 1891; Los Angeles, California, US
- Died: May 11, 1979 (aged 88); Fontana, California, US
- Occupations: Dancer, dance educator

Dorothy Lyndall (May 4, 1891 – May 11, 1979) was an American dancer and dance educator.

== Early life ==
Dorothy Stewart Lyndall was born in Los Angeles in 1891, the daughter of Charles Penny Lyndall and Deborah Stewart Lyndall. She attended the University of California, Los Angeles.

== Career ==
Lyndall was a dancer in Los Angeles, performing and touring in the 1910s as a leading member of the Norma Gould Dancers. Her frequent partner in dancing and teaching was dancer and model Bertha Wardell. She also had her own long-running school of dance in Los Angeles. Among her students in the 1930s were choreographer Myra Kinch and Yuriko Kikuchi, who later danced on Broadway and with Martha Graham. Another noted former student, Janet Collins, recalled Lyndall fondly: "Dorothy Lyndall was the greatest dance enthusiast and lover of the dance I have ever known. She loved the dance and loved dancers. She was literally a Socrates of the dance — she gathered dancers under her wings like a mother hen with her chicks." Adrienne Dore danced in 1931 programs directed by Lyndall.

In 1935, Lyndall and Myra Kinch taught a special course in eurhythmics at the University of Arizona's dance program, which was under the direction of Lyndall's student Genevieve Brown Wright. Lyndall was still teaching and touring in 1948, when she went to Hawaii to study children's dance programs, and was described as being frequently in Tucson, Arizona. In 1951 she visited Genevieve Wright in Arizona.

Lyndall was a member of the Dancers' League. She also wrote poetry, some of which was published in The Lyric West.

== Personal life ==
Dorothy Lyndall and Margaret Rees traveled together in the American Southwest, Hawaii, and Mexico. Their collection of photographs and postcards is in the University of California, Irvine Libraries. Lyndall died in 1979, in Fontana, California, aged 88 years. Her grave is in Mission City Memorial Park in Santa Clara, California.
