= A Night in Spain =

Cover sheet to the revue's libretto

A Night in Spain is a musical revue with a book by Harold R. Atteridge, music by Jean Schwartz and lyrics by Al Bryan. Additional music and lyrics were contributed by Phil Baker, Sid Silvers and Ted Healy. The revue was presented on Broadway in 1927 for a total of 174 performances.

== Production ==
A great deal of information is available about the production in 'Nobody's Stooge,' a book about Ted Healy published in 2015. The cast included Phil Baker, Ted Healy and Norma Terris. Marion Harris appeared in the Broadway production at the Winter Garden Theatre. A stand-out dancer was Helba Huara, whose innovative choreography was cited in many press reviews. Smaller roles were taken by Sid Silvers, Helen Kane (the Boop-Boop-a-Doop Girl) and Shemp Howard (of the Three Stooges). During the show's national tour and a 4-month stop in Chicago, Larry Fine (also of the Three Stooges) met Healy and Shemp and joined the show in March 1928.

The show opened at the 44th Street Theatre on May 3, 1927, then transferred to the Winter Garden Theatre on October 10, 1927, and closed on November 12, 1927. It was produced by the Shubert Brothers, and directed by Gertrude Hoffmann and Charles Judels, with additional dances choreographed by Ralph Reader

When the show closed on Broadway, it toured the country, having hit runs in Abilene, Chicago, Detroit, Oakland and San Francisco, among other venues.

== Musical numbers ==
Act 1

- Argentine
- International Vamp
- De Dum Dum
- The Sky Girl
- C'est Vous
- Promenade the Esplanade
- My Rose in Spain
- Rainy Day Pal (by Baker and Silvers)
- Love and Kisses (from Baby to You) (by Baker and Silvers)
- Columbus and Isabella

Act 2

- Hot Hot Honey
- Under the Clover Moon (by Ted Healy)
- A Spanish Shawl
- The Nocturn
- The Curfew Walk
- Bambazoola
- A Million Eyes

Also:

- Did You Mean It? by Phil Baker, Sid Silver, and Abe Lyman. From the Winter Garden Theatre version only (Introduced by Marion Harris). The only song from this show to be recorded was "Did You Mean It?" It was recorded by Marion Harris in 1927, and also by Abe Lyman, who did his own dance version in 1927.

== Cast ==
- The Andreini Orchestra
- George Anderson
- Phil Baker
- Barbera
- Grace Bowman
- Jay Brennan
- Tito Coral
- J. Colvil Dunn
- Bernice Gardener
- Bert Gardener
- Grace Hayes
- Betty Healy
- Ted Healy
- Helba Huara
- Helen Kane
- Rhea Mason
- Lola Raine
- Stanley Rogers
- Sid Silvers
- The Trainor Brothers
