= Ignacio Calderón =

Mexican footballer (born 1943)

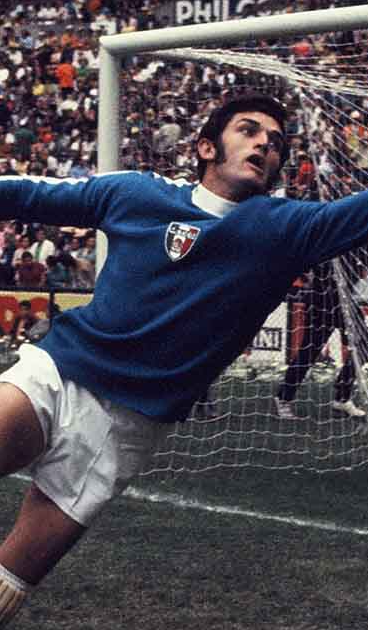

Personal information
- Full name: Ignacio Francisco Calderón González
- Date of birth: December 13, 1943 (age 82)
- Place of birth: Guadalajara, Jalisco, Mexico
- Height: 1.84 m (6 ft 0 in)
- Position: Goalkeeper

Senior career*
Years	Team	Apps	(Gls)
1962–1974	Guadalajara		
1974–1980	U de G	67	(0)
1980	Atlas	7	(0)

International career
1965–1974	Mexico	60	(0)
- * Club domestic league appearances and goals as of April 2008

Ignacio Francisco "Nacho" Calderón González (born December 13, 1943) is a Mexican former football goalkeeper who played 60 times for the Mexico national team between 1965 and 1974.

Calderón started his playing career with Guadalajara in 1962, with whom he won three Mexican league championships in 1963–64, 1964–65 and 1969–70. He was called up to the Mexico national team for the first time in 1965.

Calderón played in two FIFA World Cups for the Mexico national team, and in the 1970 World Cup he set a World Cup record of 310 minutes without conceding a goal.

In 1974 Calderón joined the U de G team that finished as runners up in the Liga MX in 1975–76 and 1976–77; and shared the CONCACAF Champions' Cup in 1978.

After a three-month spell with Atlas in 1980 Calderón retired at the age of 36.

== Personal life ==
Ignacio is twin brothers with fellow Mexican footballer and Chivas player Carlos Calderón González who played as a midfielder.

== Titles ==
Season	Team	Title
1963-64	(Mexico) Guadalajara	Mexican Primera
1964-65	(Mexico) Guadalajara	Mexican Primera
1969-70	(Mexico) Guadalajara	Mexican Primera
1978	(Mexico) U de G	CONCACAF Champions' Cup
