= Helba Huara =

- Helba Huara, by Vargas Brothers Art Studio, 1924
- Born: Helba Muñoz Huara; 1900; Cusco, Peru
- Died: 1986 (aged 85–86); Paris, France
- Occupations: dancer, model
- Years active: 1909–1936

Helba Huara (1900–1986) was a modern dancer from Peru. Her exotic appearance and unique dance style, which incorporated European and Native American influences, created a sensation in the late 1920s. Moving from Peru to the United States, she became a star on Broadway in the 1927 production of A Night in Spain. Later, she moved to Paris and became involved in the artistic and intellectual café society. She was renowned for her original and innovative costumes and dance style and worked as a photographer's model.

== Early life ==
Helba Muñoz Huara was born in 1900 in Cusco, Peru, to a Spanish medical doctor named Muñoz. While in Brazil, Muñoz traveled from Spain, met his future wife, and immigrated to Peru. While she was still a child, the family immigrated to Buenos Aires, Argentina. The family was impoverished, and from around nine, Huara danced to earn money. Beginning her career with a Russian dance troupe, Huara quickly took the stage name Helba Huara and dropped the use of Muñoz. Dancing with extreme passion, with a tragic air and intense energy, she soon developed a unique style. Huara married at age fourteen and had a daughter, Elsa Henríquez, who would later become an illustrator. Huara became well known, performing in Argentina, Bolivia, and Peru. She was photographed by the noted Vargas Brothers, Carlos and Miguel, in 1924. Their images of her were not erotic photographs but rather allowed her to act out the persona she projected. She met Gonzalo More, a Peruvian journalist who came to interview for his brother's paper after seeing her dance in Lima. Soon, she and her daughter fled the unhappy family life with Huara's husband, going with More to Havana before going to the United States.

== Career abroad ==
Arriving in the U.S., Huara was hired for the prestigious Ziegfeld Follies and billed as a captivating Spanish or Peruvian dancer,. However, according to Variety her early performances were under another name. She also appeared in shows at the Guild and Shubert Theaters. In 1927, she appeared on Broadway in A Night in Spain and though billed as part of the chorus, almost immediately was being singled out for her performances, with her "Dance of Fate" and "Dance of the Snakes". Quickly, the posters for the show were revised to show her as one of the stars. When the show closed on Broadway, it made a nationwide tour throughout 1928, with Huara appearing successfully in such venues as Abilene, Chicago, Detroit, Oakland, and San Francisco, among others. Wildly inventive biographies of Huara's origins appeared in the press, adding to her allure.

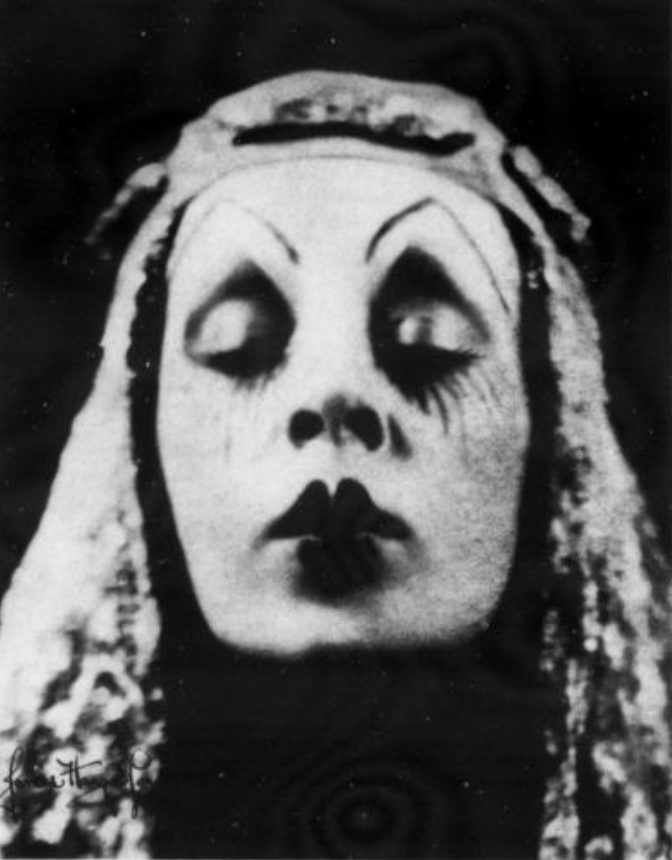
Helba Huara, from a 1929 publication

Huara's dances were described as a fusion of Peruvian folklore and Spanish techniques, using castagnets and sinuous, snake-like movements, proving a technical skill that was hypnotizing and bewitching. Performed to modern music composed by artists like Arthur Honegger and Vincent d'Indy, she balanced her wild "Incan" abandon with the bohemian music and style of the period. Huara designed her costumes and even took films of her movements in slow motion to patent her dance moves. In 1930, she played in the musical Nina Rose, at the Majestic Theatre. The following year, she was the subject of photographs entered in the Rochester International Salon of Photography by Dr. Max Thorek. Suffering from a nervous disorder and increasing deafness, Huara and More left the United States for Paris.

In 1931, Huara, More and Henríquez arrived in Paris, where Huara became known as "the dancing Inca". She performed at several of the soirées hosted by Désirée Lieven, an expatriate from Lithuania who often was referred to as a princess and became the center of leftist intelligentsia activities in Paris. Huara's elaborate costumes and dancing style combined savagery and soul. More served as Huara's accompanist, and the two caught Anaïs Nin’s attention when she saw Huara perform the "Dance of the Woman without Arms" in the early 1930s at the Théâtre de la Gaîeté. In 1933, Huara and More toured Germany to much acclaim, afterward, continuing to perform in Paris through 1935. In 1936, Huara and More attended a party where they met Nin for the first time. By that time, Huara's deafness and illness had impacted her ability to continue dancing. She and More lived in a small basement apartment shared with other revolutionary figures who opposed the conservatives in the Spanish Civil War. In her diaries, Nin wrote that she was the benefactress of the couple, though in actuality, Nin was having an affair with More. She rented a houseboat on the Seine to facilitate her rendezvous with More. In her journals, Nin referred to More as "Rango" and Huara as "Zara" disparaging Huara as a neurotic, dependent on her husband's care. In actuality, More was a person with alcohol use disorder who preferred socializing to work.

In March 1940, Huara and More fled France and arrived in New York City. During World War II, Nin set More up with a printing press in the United States. Still, the business failed due to his mismanagement. Huara ran a dance studio in New York, where she taught students like the musicologist Rosa Alarco. At the end of the war, the couple returned to Paris, where Huara remained a fixture among the avant-garde circles, before having to withdraw from activities due to illness and loss of her sight.

== Death and legacy ==
Huara died in Paris in 1986. Huara was the central character in a trilogy of novels by Carlos Calderón Fajardo, La noche humana which focuses on the Peruvian expatriate community of Paris who were political leftists. In 2017, Revista Vuelapluma (volume 10), a journal from the Universidad de Ciencias y Humanidades of Los Olivos published a chronicle of Huara's life by the journalist Pablo Paredes.
