= Charlotte Nebres =

Black American ballet dancer

Charlotte Nebres (born 2008 or 2009) is an American pre-professional ballet dancer. In 2019, at eleven years old, she become the first Black ballerina to dance the role of Marie in New York City Ballet's production of George Balanchine's The Nutcracker. Later that year, she wrote Charlotte and The Nutcracker, a children's book about her experience.

== Personal life ==
Nebres currently lives in Madison, New Jersey with her parents, brother, and sister. Her grandparents immigrated from Trinidad and the Philippines, respectively. Her mother, Danielle, was born and raised in New York City.

After recognizing a lack of diverse books for both children and adults, she and her sister, Libby, created a "little diverse library...stocked up with books written by and about people of color... She plans on expanding her little diverse library to underserved cities across New Jersey."

== Ballet ==
Nebres currently studies at the School of American Ballet.

=== The Nutcracker ===
Nebres made national news in 2021 when she became the first Black ballet dancer in the 65 years the New York City Ballet's production of The Nutcracker to dance the role of Marie, the story's heroine.

When preparing Nebres for the role, artistic director Jonathan Stafford ensured Nebres and her family that she would not have to change her hair, which Black ballet dancers often have to do to fit into ballet's European ideal. Aesha Ash, former dancer for the School of American Ballet, highlighted this issue, explaining that Black dancers can often receive messages they don't belong, saying "it was sometimes the small things, like not having proper hair products or stage makeup that was in her skin tone, that sent a message about whether she truly belonged."

Nebres discussed her experience on various news networks, including Today, Good Morning America, BET, and the Tamron Hall Show.

In 2020, Disney+ produced a six-part mini-series documenting a season at the School of American Ballet as Nebres and other dancers prepared for The Nutcracker performance.

In 2021, Nebres was interviewed as part of the NAACP Image Awards' Young Creatives segment, which highlights Black youth who "have already demonstrated a passion and commitment to creative expression."

== Charlotte and the Nutcracker (2021) ==
Charlotte and the Nutcracker: The True Story of a Girl Who Made Ballet History was written with the help of Sarah Warren, illustrated by Alea Marley, and published December 21, 2021 by Random House Books for Young Readers. The book tells Nebres's story of becoming the first Black ballerina to dance the role of Marie in New York City Ballet's production of George Balanchine's The Nutcracker alongside her family's Trinidadian and Filipinx holiday traditions.

The book received starred reviews from School Library Journal and Kirkus, as well as positive reviews from Publishers Weekly.

Kirkus noted, "This satisfying story of inspiration, dedication, perseverance, and progress will have readers yearning to see the ballet and get into the holiday spirit," a sentiment echoed by Publishers Weekly. Tissue
