= Museo Mario Testino =

Museum in Peru

Mario Testino Museum (MATE)
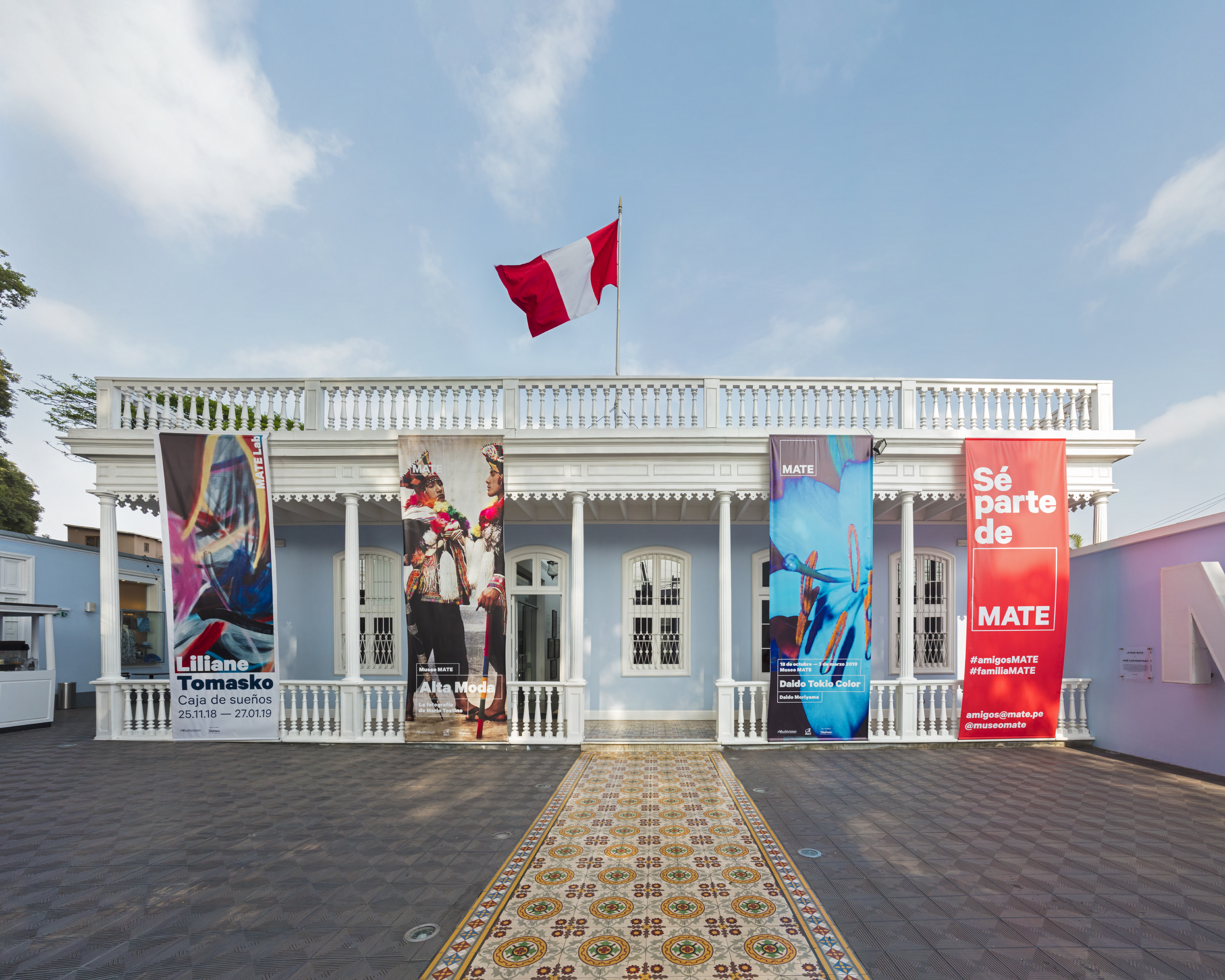
- Established: 2012
- Location: Avenida Pedro de Osma 409, Barranco, Lima, Peru
- Coordinates: 12.153760°S 77.022818°W
- Founder: Mario Testino
- Website: mate.pe

Mario Testino Museum (also known as MATE, pronounced mAH-teh) is a non-profit organization founded by Peruvian fashion photographer Mario Testino, in 2012. It's a platform for the development of creative industries, a window for the international contemporary art in Lima and for peruvian talent to the world. MATE presents exhibitions from contemporary artists next to the permanent exhibition of Mario Testino's work.

== Mission and vision ==
MATE museum has the vision to create a vibrant environment and prosper for the individual expression, celebrate the contributions from Peru to art and culture in the world, and stimulate the creative industry in the country. This non profit organization is dedicated to the stimulation and development of the local creative industry. All funds raised are intended to finance educational and cultural programs carried out in favor of the development and promotion of the arts.

== Permanent Collection ==
The permanent collection explores Testino’s work through eight rooms, divided according to elements that distinguish his images, such as the complex choreography of his group photographs or his ability to pass through and capture cultures from all over the world, a balance between traditionalism and creativity. Models like Kate Moss, Gisele Bündchen, Kendall Jenner, Gigi Hadid, Cara Delevingne, Karlie Kloss have posed for Mario’s lens. As well as artists like Blake Lively, Beyoncé, Lady Gaga, Taylor Swift, Justin Bieber and many more.

=== Alta Moda ===
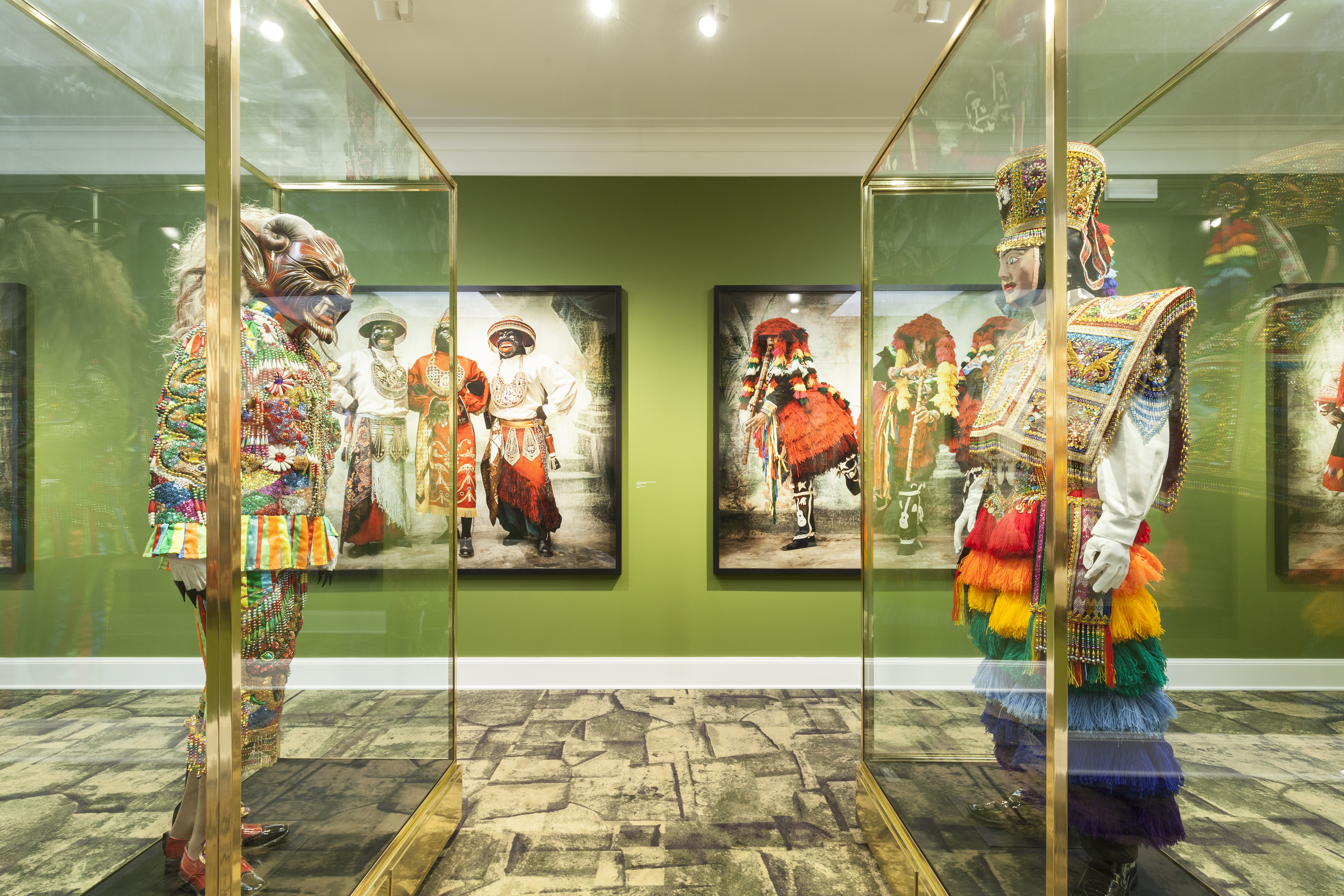

Alta Moda arises from a research still ongoing. The exhibition is the result of the first five years: a series of portraits of dancers from Cusco in traditional costumes. When Mario considered the aesthetics of AltaModa he decided to have as an inspiration the photographer from Cusco, Martín Chambi. The background that generates a contrast with the costumes is the one that Chambi used in his photographs. “I hope my images show how these traditions still exist in the present, at least for now.” - Mario Testino

=== Diana ===
The iconic photos taken to Diana, Princess of Wales, in 1997. An area dedicated to the portraits that Testino made of Diana of Wales, the last official portraits before her death; published in Vanity Fair magazine, july edition, 1997. The photos were taken on the occasion of the auction of costumes that Diana organized with Christie’s. The room also exhibits a replica of one of the auctioned costumes, donated by Donatella Versace to MATE museum, along with the furniture made especially for the exhibition of Mario Testino’s images in 2005, at Kensington Palace.

== Exhibitions ==
MATE also presents temporary exhibitions, in the Temporal I and MATE Lab rooms. MATE has given emphasis to national and international artists expositions, that involve local production and collaboration. It's a platform for the development of creative industries. A showcase of international contemporary art in Lima and Peruvian talent to the world.

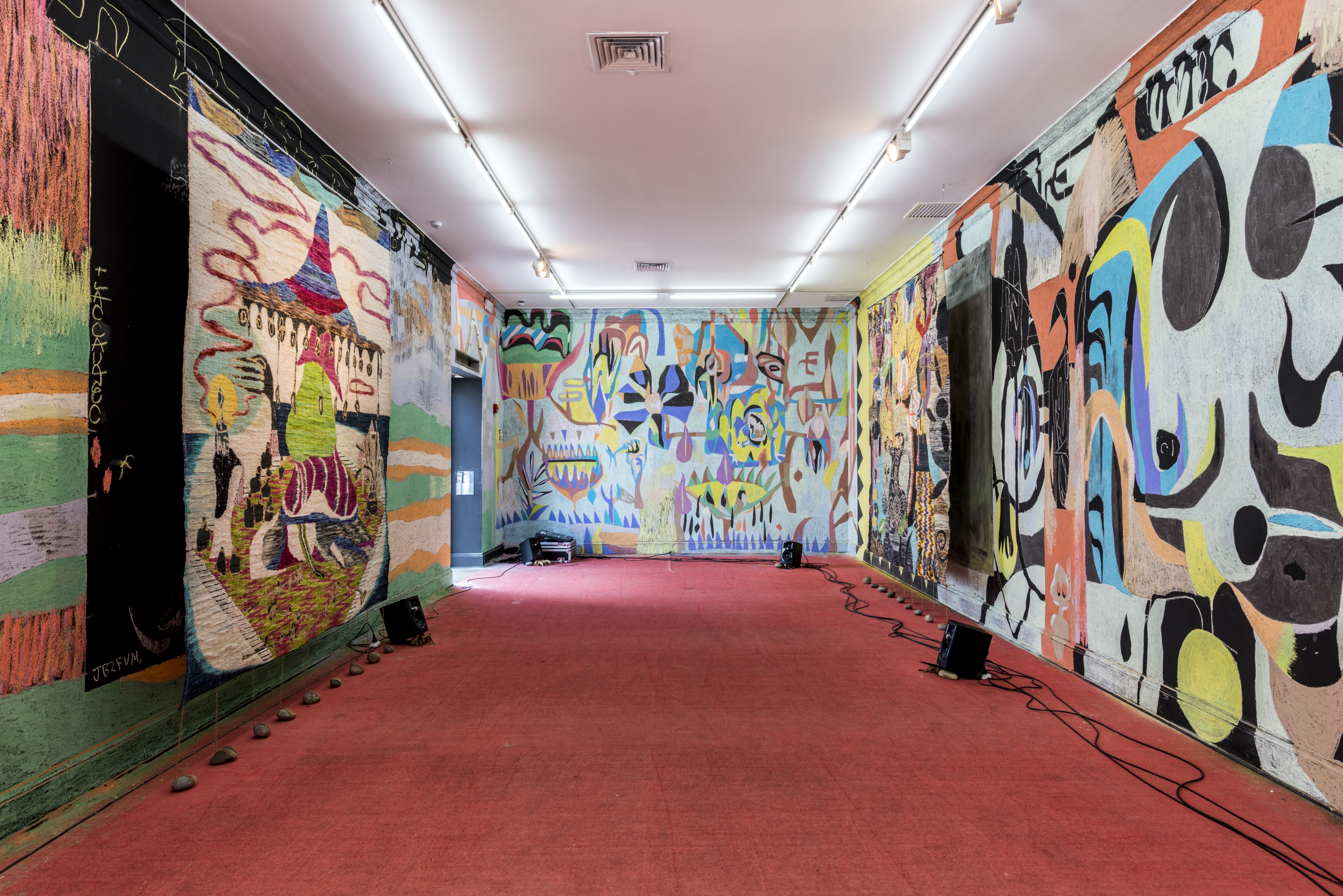

- Yann Gerstberger, “A Mangrove at dusk”, Museo MATE 2019.
- Raura Oblitas, “Lote”, Museo MATE 2019.
- James Nares, “Street”, Museo MATE 2019.
- Katherine Bernhardt, “Mundo sandía”, Museo MATE 2018.
- Eli Sudbrack, “Avaf: Abstracto viajero andinos fetichizados”, Museo MATE 2017.
- Graciela Iturbide, “Maestros de la fotografía”, Museo MATE 2017.
- Chris Levine, “Light is love”, Museo MATE 2017.
- Alan Poma, “Enemigo de las estrellas”, Museo MATE 2017.
- Miguel Andrade, “Estratos”, Museo MATE 2016
- Dr. Lakra, “Dr. Lakra”, Museo MATE 2016
- José Vera Matos, “Nuevas almas salvajes”, Museo MATE 2016
- Hamidou Maiga, “La ruta del Níger: De Mopti a Tombuctú”, Museo MATE 2016
- Pawel Althamer, “Draftsmen’s Congress”, Museo MATE 2015.
- Philippe Gruenberg, “Geografía de la diferencia”, Museo MATE 2015.
- “Sin Censura”, Museo MATE 2015., Ed van der Elsken
- Andy Warhol, “Film Portraits”, Museo MATE 2014.
- George Hurrell, “Legends in light”, Museo MATE 2014
- Ximena Garrido-Lecca, “Los suelos”, Museo MATE 2014
- Mario Testino, “Somos libres”, Museo MATE 2013.
- Musuk Nolte y Ernesto Benavides, “Piruw” y “Wanu”, Museo MATE 2013.
- Mario Testino, “Todo o nada”, Museo MATE 2012.

=== MATE Lab ===
MATE Lab is a mixed-use space space with temporary exhibitions. The room combines varied proposals, exhibitions, projections, experimental projects, workshops and other activities designed by artists, designers and creators invited by the museum to develop their proposals.

- Maya Ballén, Literal, Museo MATE 2019.
- Mario Testino, LIMA, Museo MATE 2019.
- Liliane Tomasko, Caja de sueños, Museo MATE 2018.
- Daido Moriyama, Daido Tokyo Color, Museo MATE 2018.

== Mansion ==
Built in 1898 by the engineer Mateo Pagano, mansion MATE shares the characteristics of the typical Barranco’s ranches of the time: it is a rectangular construction of a single level, raised in adobe and full of details that denote a special craft skill. By 2011, when the diagnostic work began, the house was in a state of deterioration, despite which it had maintained its original structure. In October of that year the restoration began, in charge of the peruvian architect Augusto de Cossio. It took 10 months and involved repairing and strengthening the original adobe walls of the house, as well as restoring all the interior carpentry. in addition, details such as friezes and ornamental cornices were restored or reproduced from scratch, and the lighting was designed recreating the original position of ceiling lamps. All the historical restoration works were executed by the specialized professional team of the “Escuela Taller de Lima” and the art sculptors of “Escuela Autónoma de Bellas Artes”. During the restoration it returned to traditional adobe. Complementary to the renovation, a new adjacent building was built at the back of the villa, an exhibition gallery and Bodega MATE. This spaces were designed to satisfy the functional needs of MATE, and to conserve the harmony with original architecture, the furniture is also contemporary to the house. Mansion MATE was finished in July 2002.

== Bodega MATE ==
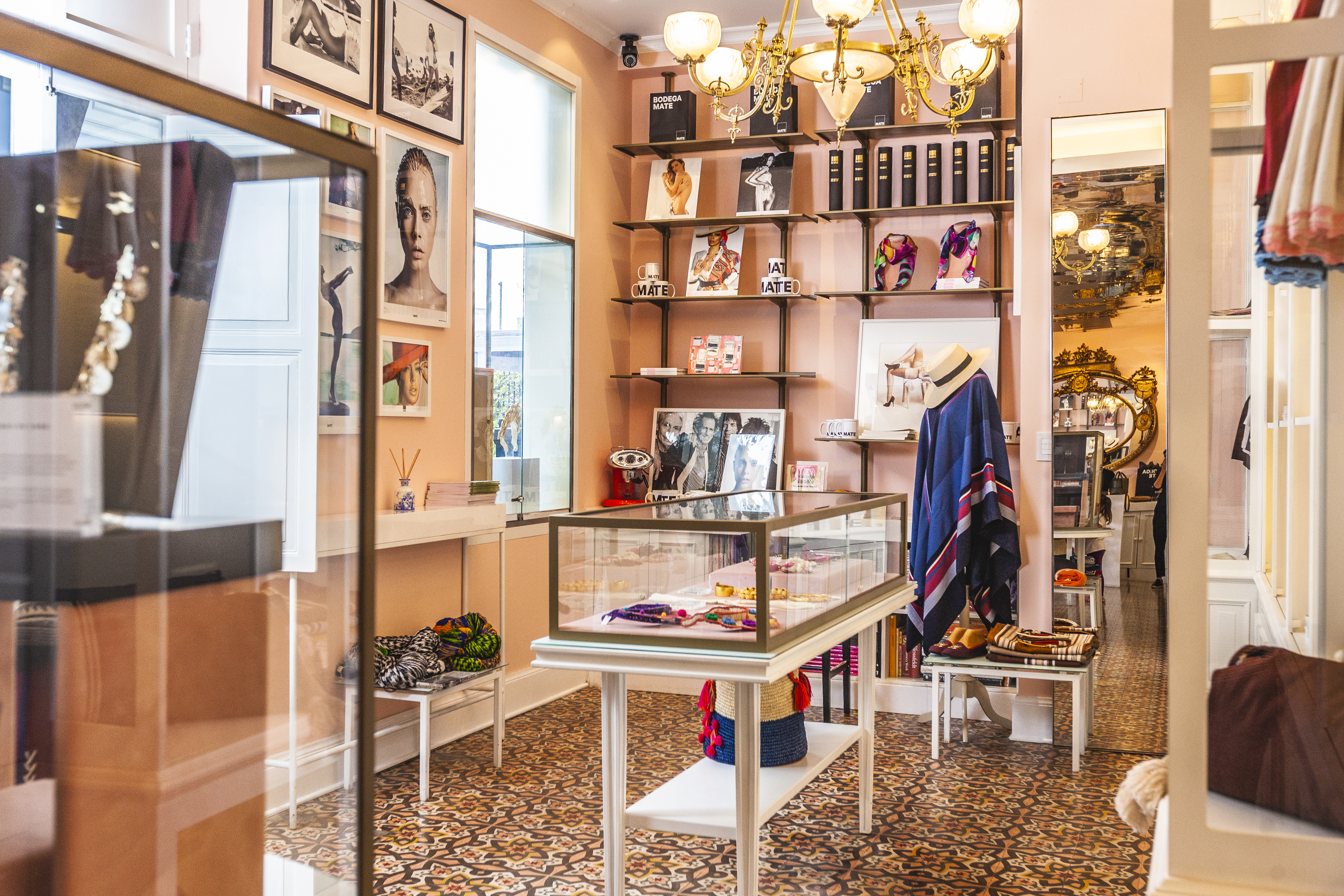
Bodega MATE

A lot more than a museum store, Bodega MATE is a platform of Peruvian and Latin American design, with more than 50 designers and artist, from 11 countries of the region. The store has the vision to value Latin American heritage through art, fashion and contemporary design. The main objective is that the museum achieves self-sustainability, and that it can expand its proposals as an exhibition space and as a catalyst for the local creative industry. It is the only authorized boutique to sell original photographs by Mario Testino. Bodega MATE opened its first store outside MATE, in Larcomar, in August 2019. A continuation of its mission as a cultural space and sustainable local luxury.
