= Jack Jones (journalist) =

American journalist

- Born: John E. Jones Jr. June 14, 1924; El Paso, Texas, U.S.
- Died: May 12, 2011 (aged 86); Oceanside, California, U.S.
- Education: University of Southern California (BJ)
- Occupation: Journalist
- Spouse: Brie Jones

John E. Jones, Jr. (June 14, 1924 – May 12, 2011) was an American journalist. He was part of a Los Angeles Times team whose coverage of the August 1965 Watts Riots and its aftermath won the 1966 Pulitzer Prize in the Local General or Spot News Reporting category.

== Biography ==
John E. Jones, Jr. was born on June 14, 1924, in El Paso, Texas. He earned a Bachelor of Journalism in 1949 at the University of Southern California.

During World War II, Jones served in the Navy's amphibious forces. From 1954 to 1989, he worked at the Los Angeles Times. He wrote three novels, Journey Into Death (1956), The Animal (1975) and Baja (1984).

He was married twice. The first ended in divorce and his second wife, Brie Jones, survived him. As the actress Barbara Stewart she had played in the television version of Dragnet, whose creator and star Jack Webb "insisted on paying for the Stewart–Jones wedding". Jack Jones died of lung disease on May 12, 2011, at his Oceanside, California home.
