= List of works and exhibitions by Mario Testino =

== Exhibitions ==
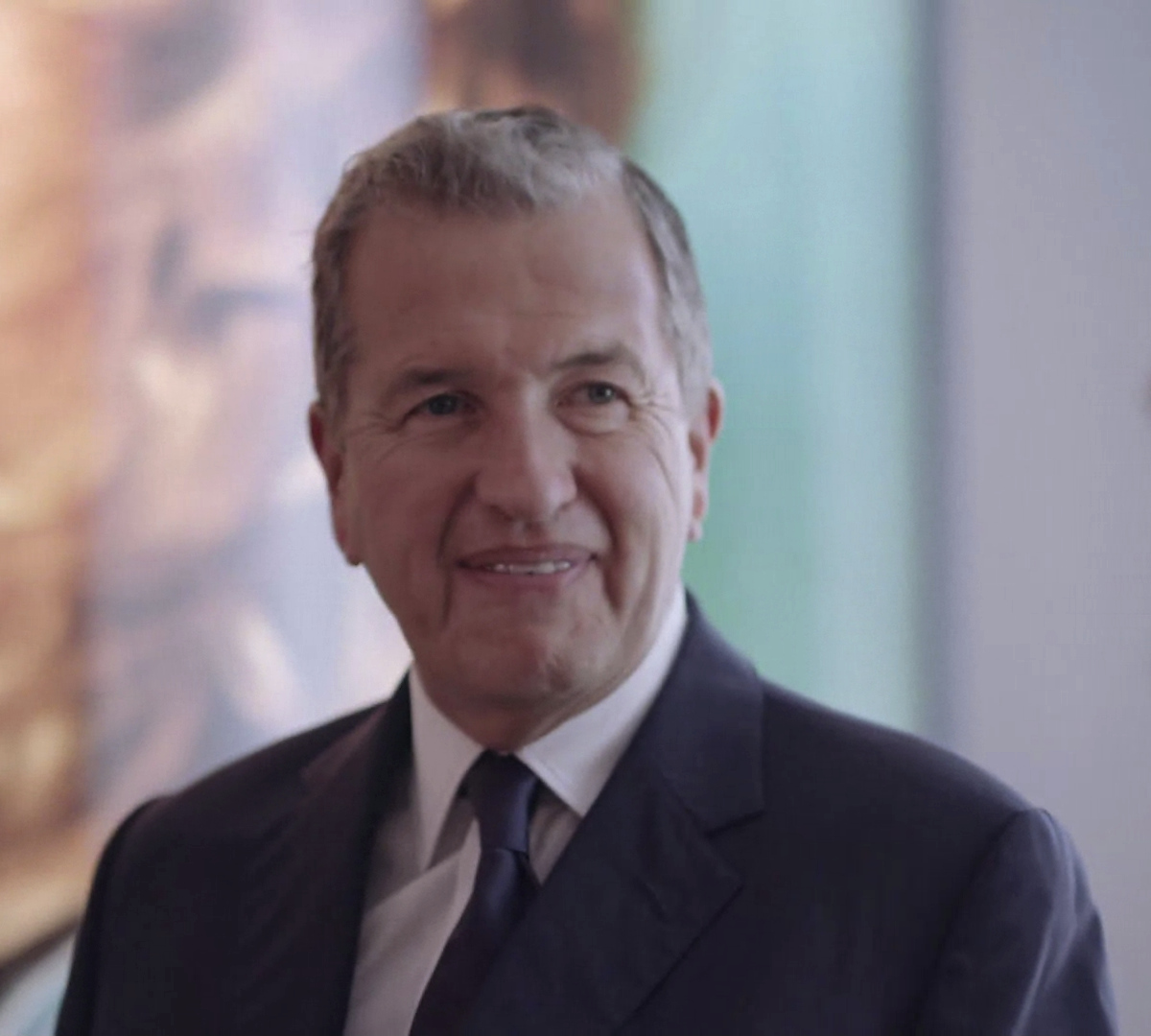
Testino at No Limits exhibition, 2016

=== Solo exhibitions ===
==== 1997 ====
- Fashion Photographs 1993–1997 & Images for Gucci, Bunkamura Gallery, Tokyo, Japan

==== 1998 ====
- Mario Testino, Mary Boone Gallery, New York, US
- Fashion Photographs, Fundação Armando Alvares Penteado (FAAP), São Paulo, Brazil
- A New Venture, Galleria Raucci/Santamaria, Naples, Italy

==== 1999 ====
- Amsterdam, Timothy Taylor Gallery, London, UK
- Front Row / Backstage, Visionaire Gallery, New York, US

==== 2000 ====
- Mario Testino, Galerie Vedovi, Brussels, Belgium

==== 2002 ====
- Portraits, Foam Fotografiemuseum, Amsterdam, Netherlands
- Portraits, Museo Palazzo Reale, Milan, Italy
- Boys and Girls, Galleri Charlotte Lund, Stockholm, Sweden
- Portraits, National Portrait Gallery, London, UK

==== 2003 ====
- Disciples, Timothy Taylor Gallery, London, UK
- Portraits, National Galleries of Scotland, Edinburgh, UK

==== 2004 ====
- Portraits, Tokyo Metropolitan Museum of Photography, Tokyo, Japan

==== 2005 ====
- Diana, Princess of Wales by Mario Testino, Kensington Palace, London, UK

==== 2006 ====
- Out of Fashion, Phillips de Pury & Company, Paris, France
- Portraits, Museo San Ildefonso, Mexico City, Mexico
- Disciples, Galería Ramis Barquet, Monterrey, Mexico
- Out of Fashion, Phillips de Pury & Company, New York, US

==== 2007 ====
- Out of Fashion, NRW Forum, Düsseldorf, Germany

==== 2008 ====
- Obsessed by You, Phillips de Pury & Company, London, UK

==== 2010 ====
- Todo o Nada, Museo Thyssen-Bornemisza, Madrid, Spain
- Kate Who?, Phillips de Pury & Company, London, UK
- Portraits, Museo de Arte de Lima, Lima, Peru

==== 2011 ====
- Todo o Nada, Fondazione Memmo – Palazzo Ruspoli, Rome, Italy

==== 2012 ====
- Private View, Shanghai Art Museum, Shanghai, China
- British Royal Portraits, Museum of Fine Arts, Boston, US
- In Your Face, Museum of Fine Arts, Boston, US
- British Royal Portraits, National Portrait Gallery, London, UK
- Todo o Nada, Mate – Museo Mario Testino, Lima, Peru
- Private View, Today Art Museum, Beijing, China
- Moss Testino, The Finstock Gallery, London

==== 2013 ====
- Alta Moda, Queen Sofía Spanish Institute, New York, US
- Private View, Seoul Arts Center, Seoul, South Korea
- Alta Moda, Mate – Museo Mario Testino, Lima, Peru
- Mario Testino, Prism, Los Angeles, US

==== 2014 ====
- Alta Moda, Dallas Contemporary, Dallas, US
- In Your Face, Fundação Armando Alvares, Penteado (FAAP), São Paulo, Brazil
- Extremes, Yvon Lambert Gallery, Paris, France
- In Your Face, MALBA, Buenos Aires, Argentina

==== 2015 ====
- In Your Face, Kunstbibliothek / Kulturforum, Staatliche Museen zu Berlin, Berlin, Germany

==== 2016 ====
- No Limits, Kunstforeningen GL STRAND, Copenhagen, Denmark

==== 2017 ====
- Undressed, Helmut Newton Foundation, Berlin, Germany

==== 2019 ====
- Mario Testino: East, Hamiltons Gallery, London
- Superstar, Erarta Museum of Contemporary Art, Saint Petersburg, Russia

==== 2020 ====
- Smile!, Nicola Erni Collection, Steinhausen, Switzerland

==== 2021 ====
- Mario Testino: South Americana, Hamiltons Gallery, London, United Kingdom
- Mario Testino: Unfiltered (Part 2), 29 Arts in Progress, Milan, Italy
- Mario Testino: Unfiltered (Part 1), 29 Arts in Progress, Milan, Italy

==== 2023 ====
- Mario Testino: Let the Sun Shine In, Holden Luntz Gallery, Palm Beach, US
- Mario Testino: Gone Wild, Hamiltons Gallery, London, United Kingdom

=== Art collection exhibitions ===
==== 2013 ====
- Somos Libres, MATE – Museo Mario Testino, Lima, Peru

==== 2014 ====
- Somos Libres II, Pinacoteca Giovanni e Marella Agnelli, Turin, Italy

== Bibliography ==
=== Books and catalogues ===
- Fashion Photographs 1993-1997 & Images for Gucci Art Partner, 1997
- Fashion Photographs Fundação Armando Alvares Penteado (FAAP), 1998
- Any Objections? Phaidon, 1998
- Front Row/Backstage Bulfinch, 1999
- Alive Bulfinch, 2001
- Portraits Bulfinch Press, 2002
- Disciples Timothy Taylor Gallery, 2003
- Kids Scriptum Editions, 2003
- Diana Princess of Wales by Mario Testino at Kensington Palace Taschen, 2005
- Out of Fashion Phillips de Pury, 2006
- Let Me In! Taschen, 2007
- Obsessed by You Phillips de Pury, 2008
- MaRIO DE JANEIRO Testino Taschen, 2009
- Todo o Nada, Museo Thyssen-Bornemisza, 2010
- Kate Who? Phillips de Pury, 2010
- Kate Moss by Mario Testino Taschen, 2011
- Private View Taschen, 2012
- In Your Face Taschen, 2012
- Alta Moda MATE (Museo Mario Testino), 2013
- Sir Taschen, 2015
- Undressed Taschen, 2017
- Fina Estampa, MATE – Museo Mario Testino, 2018
- Pasito a Paso, MATE – Museo Mario Testino, 2019
- Ciao, Taschen, 2020
- WOW, Superlabo, 2020
- I Love You, Taschen, 2022

== Selected special projects and guest editorships ==
=== 1997 ===
- Dutch, No. 1 by Mario Testino
- Visionaire, No. 22 (Chic)

=== 1998 ===
- A Coincidence of the Arts by Mario Testino and Martin Amis, Coromandel Express

=== 2000 ===
- Stern Portfolio, No. 20 (Mario Testino Party)

=== 2001 ===
- Dutch, No. 34 by Mario Testino
- Visionaire, No. 35 (Man)
- Pirelli Calendar 2001

=== 2004 ===
- Instinctive: Latin American Artists Selected by Mario Testino, Andrea Rosen Gallery, New York, US

=== 2005 ===
- New Photography Selected by Mario Testino, Photo London, Burlington Gardens, London, UK
- Visionaire, No. 46 (Uncensored)

=== 2006 ===
- Stern Portfolio, No. 53 (Mario Testino)

=== 2007 ===
- Mario Testino: At Home, Yvon Lambert Gallery, New York, US
- Lima Peru, Damiani

=== 2008 ===
- German Vogue Special Edition (Sex) by Mario Testino

=== 2011 ===
- Bruma, 20 Hoxton Square Projects, London, UK
- Vogue Brasil 36th Anniversary Special Edition by Mario Testino

=== 2012 ===
- Spanish Vogue Special Edition (Celebration) by Mario Testino

=== 2013 ===
- Vogue China 100th Issue Special Edition by Mario Testino
- Vogue Brasil Special Edition (Body) by Mario Testino
- Vogue Paris Special Edition (Peru) by Mario Testino

=== 2014 ===
- Vogue Japan 15th Anniversary Special Edition (Obsession) by Mario Testino
- Welt am Sonntag Special Edition by Mario Testino
- German Vogue Special Edition (Blonde) by Mario Testino
- Somos Libres II, Rizzoli

=== 2015 ===
- Me and You: Mario Testino and Ed van der Elsken Annet Gelink Gallery

=== 2016 ===
- Vogue Australia Special Edition by Mario Testino
- Vogue Italia Special Edition (Laugh) by Mario Testino

=== 2017 ===
- Man About Town 10th Anniversary Edition AW17
- Vogue India Special Edition by Mario Testino
- Dutch Vogue Special Edition by Mario Testino
