= Raven Wilkinson =

American ballet dancer (1935–2018)

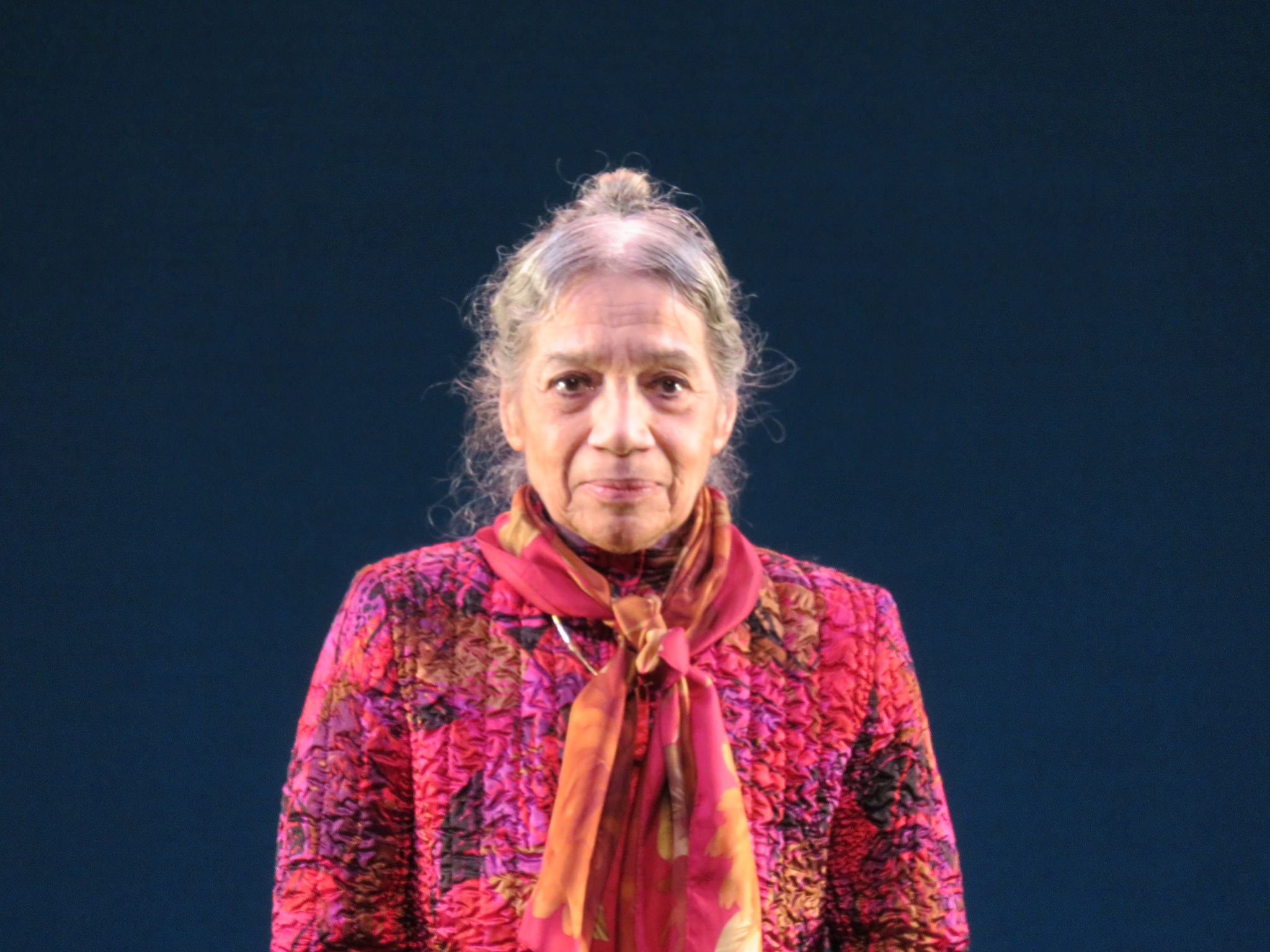
- Wilkinson in 2016
- Born: Anne Raven Wilkinson; February 2, 1935; New York City, U.S.
- Died: December 17, 2018 (aged 83)
- Occupation: dancer
- Dancing career
- Former groups: Ballet Russe de Monte Carlo; Dutch National Ballet; New York City Opera Ballet

Anne Raven Wilkinson (February 2, 1935 – December 17, 2018) was an American dancer who is credited with having been the first African-American woman to dance for a major classical ballet company. Wilkinson broke the color barrier in 1955 when she signed a contract to dance full-time with the Ballet Russe de Monte Carlo. She was promoted to soloist during her second season with the troupe, and remained with the company for six years. Wilkinson later became a mentor to American Ballet Theatre principal dancer Misty Copeland.

== Early life and training ==
Anne Raven Wilkinson was born in New York City on February 2, 1935, to Anne James Wilkinson and Dr. Frost Birnie Wilkinson, a doctor. She had a brother 2 years younger, Frost Bernie Wilkinson Jr. The family lived in a middle-class neighborhood in Harlem. She was baptized in the Episcopal faith and her family adhered to the Anglo-Catholic tradition. They attended services at Church of St. Mary the Virgin and the Church of the Transfiguration. Wilkinson's father's office at 152nd Street and Amsterdam Avenue was located across the street from the Dance Theatre of Harlem.

Wilkinson became a ballet fan at a young age, after seeing Ballet Russe de Monte Carlo perform Coppelia. Her mother, who had studied ballet in Chicago, took young Raven to the School of American Ballet for lessons. But they said they could not accept her until she was nine, so she initially trained in the Dalcroze method. According to Wilkinson, "It was basically eurhythmics and was all about music and tempi and meters." For her ninth birthday, an uncle made her the gift of ballet lessons at the Swoboda School, later known as the Ballet Russe School. Wilkinson's first teachers included well-known dancers from Russia's Bolshoi Theatre, Maria and Vecheslav Swoboda.

Sergei Denham, director of the Ballet Russe de Monte Carlo, bought the Swoboda School in 1951, giving Wilkinson an opportunity to audition for the troupe. Even though she was light-skinned, acceptance into a ballet company was unlikely because of her race. Fellow ballet students also advised her not to seek a position. But, in 1954, Wilkinson auditioned for the Ballet Russe de Monte Carlo. She was rejected. On a second attempt, she was rejected once again. On her third try, in 1955, Denham informed her that she had been accepted on a six-week trial basis.

== Career ==
=== Ballet Russe de Monte Carlo ===
Wilkinson advanced to the position of soloist in her second season with Ballet Russe and remained with the group for six years. She performed with the company across the U.S., routinely dancing the waltz solo in Les Sylphides. Her repertoire also included roles in Ballet Imperial, Le Beau Danube, Capriccio Espagnol, Gaîté Parisienne, Giselle, Graduation Ball, Harlequinade, Swan Lake, and Variations Classiques.

As an African American, she faced many difficulties while on tour, particularly in the segregated South. When the troupe stayed in "whites only" hotels, Wilkinson kept her race a secret. She later told an interviewer, "I didn't want to put the company in danger, but also never wanted to deny what I was. If someone questioned me directly, I couldn't say, 'No, I'm not black.'"

For two years, things went well. Because there were many foreign dancers in the company, including a number of South Americans, her skin color was not an issue. In 1957, however, she was barred from staying with the troupe when an Atlanta, Georgia, hotel owner asked her outright if she was black. Wilkinson refused to lie and was sent away in a "colored" taxi to a "colored motel."

As word of Wilkinson's racial identity spread, discrimination became increasingly problematic in both her personal and professional life. Denham forbade her from dancing in certain locations and sent her ahead to safer cities on the tour. Ultimately, one of the company's ballet mistresses told her she would not go any further in her ballet career and should leave to start

=== Between ballet companies ===
Following her departure from Ballet Russe, Wilkinson auditioned for several U.S.-based ballet companies, including New York City Ballet, American Ballet Theatre, and the Metropolitan Opera Ballet. But, she was not accepted. Disheartened, she stopped dancing for two years. Wilkinson worked briefly in customer service for a New York department store. Then, because she had always been attracted to the spiritual life, she joined an Anglican convent of the Sisterhood of the Holy Nativity in Fond du Lac, Wisconsin. She stayed for only six months as she soon realized she had been given a great gift she had not used to its fullest. She returned to ballet classes, and not long after, to performing when and where she could.

=== Dutch National Ballet ===
In the mid-1960s, Sylvester Campbell, an African-American principal dancer with the Dutch National Ballet, suggested Wilkinson approach that company. After speaking with them, she was invited to join the troupe as second soloist. She moved to the Netherlands in 1967 and stayed with the National Ballet for seven years. She performed in Les Sylphides, The Firebird, Serenade, Giselle, Mozartiana, Concerto Barocco, Swan Lake, Symphony in C, La Valse, The Snow Maiden and Graduation Ball. In 1974, at the age of 38, a homesick Wilkinson retired and returned to the U.S.

=== New York City Opera Ballet ===
Wilkinson did not stay in retirement long. When she returned to New York, the New York City Opera asked her to dance. She performed with them from 1974 until 1985. She continued with the opera as a character dancer and actor until 2011 when the company disbanded. Among her acting credits is the role of Malla in Stephen Sondheim's A Little Night Music (1990–1991). She also played Bloody Mary's assistant in a Broadway revival of South Pacific in 1987.

== Later life and death ==
Misty Copeland, the first African American to gain principal dancer status at the American Ballet Theatre, has called Wilkinson a mentor. Copeland's children's book, "The Firebird", was inspired by her relationship with Wilkinson. The narrative tells of a young dancer who, with Copeland's help, finds self-confidence and success.

Wilkinson presented the 2014 Dance Magazine Award to Copeland in December of that year. In June 2015, Wilkinson received the 2015 Dance/USA Trustee Award from presenter Misty Copeland.

Wilkinson's biography is included in Black Ballerina, a full-length documentary. The film tells the story of three black ballerinas from the past: Wilkinson, Delores Brown and Joan Myers Brown and contrasts their experiences with those of three young black dancers presently pursuing ballet careers.

Raven Wilkinson died on December 17, 2018, at the age of 83.

== See also ==
- Discrimination in dance
