= Vargas Brothers Art Studio =

Photographic studio in Peru (1912–1958)

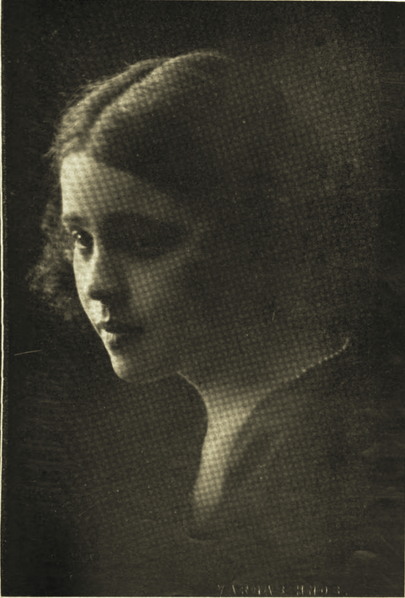
Caption above the photo: GALERIA SOCIAL AREQUIPENA Caption below the photo: Senorita Laura Arispe Photo: Vargas Brothers Art Studio, Arequipa, Peru.

The Vargas Brothers Art Studio (Estudio de Arte Vargas Hermanos, 1912–1958) was an iconic photographic studio operated by the brothers Carlos and Miguel Vargas in Arequipa, Peru. Winning numerous awards for their photography and techniques, the negatives of the studio have been preserved in digital format.

== History ==
Carlos (1885-1979) and Miguel Vargas (1887-1976) were born in humble circumstances in Arequipa, Peru. Enrolling in the Salesian College of Arequipa, the brothers caught the attention of Max T. Vargas, a noted photographer and father of the artist Alberto Vargas, by manufacturing their own camera. The class project received the school's silver medal and soon thereafter in 1900, they became apprentices to Max T. Vargas, who had no familial ties to the brothers.

In 1912, the Vargas brothers opened their studio and met with immediate success. Utilizing luxurious settings and projecting the elegance of their era, the galleries of Estudio de Arte Vargas Hnos. became the cultural center of the city. In a time when Arequipa did not have other galleries or museums, the Vargas' studio allowed painters and other artists to exhibit their works. By the 1920s, the studio had gained both a national and international reputation. The brothers hosted sixteen exhibitions of their top works and were frequently featured in magazines both in Peru and internationally. In 1925, they were awarded the gold medal in Buenos Aires at the Salon of Photographic Art and won the Grand Prize at the Bolivian Centennial of the Independence. In 1928, their works were featured in the Seville Exhibition, in Spain.

Masters of the chiaroscuro technique, which uses high-contrast lighting to achieve dramatic effect, the Vargas brothers captured a world of nostalgia and illusion. Their most compelling works include nocturnes, featuring the architecture and landscape of Arequipa offset by the night sky. By utilizing long exposures, bonfires and magnesium flashes, the brothers created images which captured the beauty of the Andean sky. Though they excelled at portraiture, for example with their images of Helba Huara and Isabel Sanchez Osorio, the studio created a diverse range of photographs depicting churches, disasters, factories, homes, hospitals, offices, parades and schools. When the Great Depression arrived and photography became less of a luxury and more accessible to average people, the elaborate sets and creativity that had been their hallmark changed into a more modern commercial photographic studio. The business continued to operate until 1958.

== Legacy ==
In 1999 some 15,000 photographic plates from the Vargas Brothers Art Studio were inventoried and restored. Digitized scans of the negatives were made in the event that the original glass negatives are damaged or destroyed. Exhibitions and publications about the studio work of the Vargas brothers has continued into the 21st century. In 2008, a book regarding their work, Arequipa en blanco y negro: el estudio de Arte Vargas Hnos. 1912-1930, was published in Madrid. There have been exhibits in Santiago, Chile (2008), Colombia (2012), and the United States (2006-2007). In 2013, a centennial celebration hosted by the Peruvian Ministry of Culture commemorating the founding of the studio was held in Peru.
