= Carlos Calderón (footballer, born 1943) =

Mexican footballer (born 1943)

Personal information
- Full name: Carlos Alberto Calderón González
- Date of birth: 13 December 1943 (age 82)
- Place of birth: Guadalajara, Jalisco, Mexico
- Position: Midfielder

Youth career
- Guadalajara

Senior career*
Years	Team	Apps	(Gls)
1963–1973	Guadalajara		
1976	Philadelphia Atoms	4	(1)

International career
1970	Mexico	1	(0)
- * Club domestic league appearances and goals

Carlos Alberto Calderón González (born 13 December 1943) is a Mexican retired footballer. Nicknamed "Cuate", he played as a midfielder for Guadalajara within the Liga MX and the Philadelphia Atoms for the North American Soccer League throughout the 1960s and the 1970s. He also represented Mexico internationally in 1970.

== Club career ==
Finding himself within the farming system of his home club of Guadalajara, he made his senior debut for the club during the 1963–64 season against Tampico Madero, playing alongside players such as Arturo Chaires, Francisco Jara, Salvador Reyes, Guillermo Sepúlveda, José Villegas, Antonio Jasso and Héctor Hernández with his debut season seeing Chivas win their 6th national title. With each additional season within the club, Calderón earned more and more goals throughout each season to where he played a key role throughout the 1968–69 season as he was Chivas' top scorer for the 1968–69 Copa México as the club reached the semi-finals. He also had similar prominence during the 1969–70 season to where despite being a midfielder, often outperformed the club's forwards whenever given the opportunity. A particular match of the season came during the home match against América as during the 4–1 victory, Calderón scored 2 goals throughout the match.

Calderón initially retired following the 1972–73 season. However, following the purchase of North American Soccer League club Philadelphia Atoms by a group of Mexican investors, manager Jesús Ponce Labastida sought Calderón to be within the attacking of a club that had now become predominantly composed of Mexican players. Depsite Calderón scoring a goal within four games, the club had a poor performance within the Eastern Division and folded following the season.

== International career ==
Calderón made his only international appearance for Mexico in a friendly against Sweden in preparation for the upcoming 1970 FIFA World Cup. Despite being part of the preliminary roster for the tournament, he was ultimately not chosen within the final team unlike his brother.

== Personal life ==
Carlos is twin brothers with Ignacio Calderón who also both played for Chivas as well as represented Mexico internationally for the 1966 and 1970 FIFA World Cup's. Throughout the early 1970s, the two were collectively known as the "Cuates" as they had earned a reputation for being crucial members of Chivas' squad at the time. However, Carlos chose not to start an acting career as he instead took interest in mountain cycling. He also works as within his dental office to provide for his faily.
