= Janet Collins =

American prima ballerina, choreographer and teacher

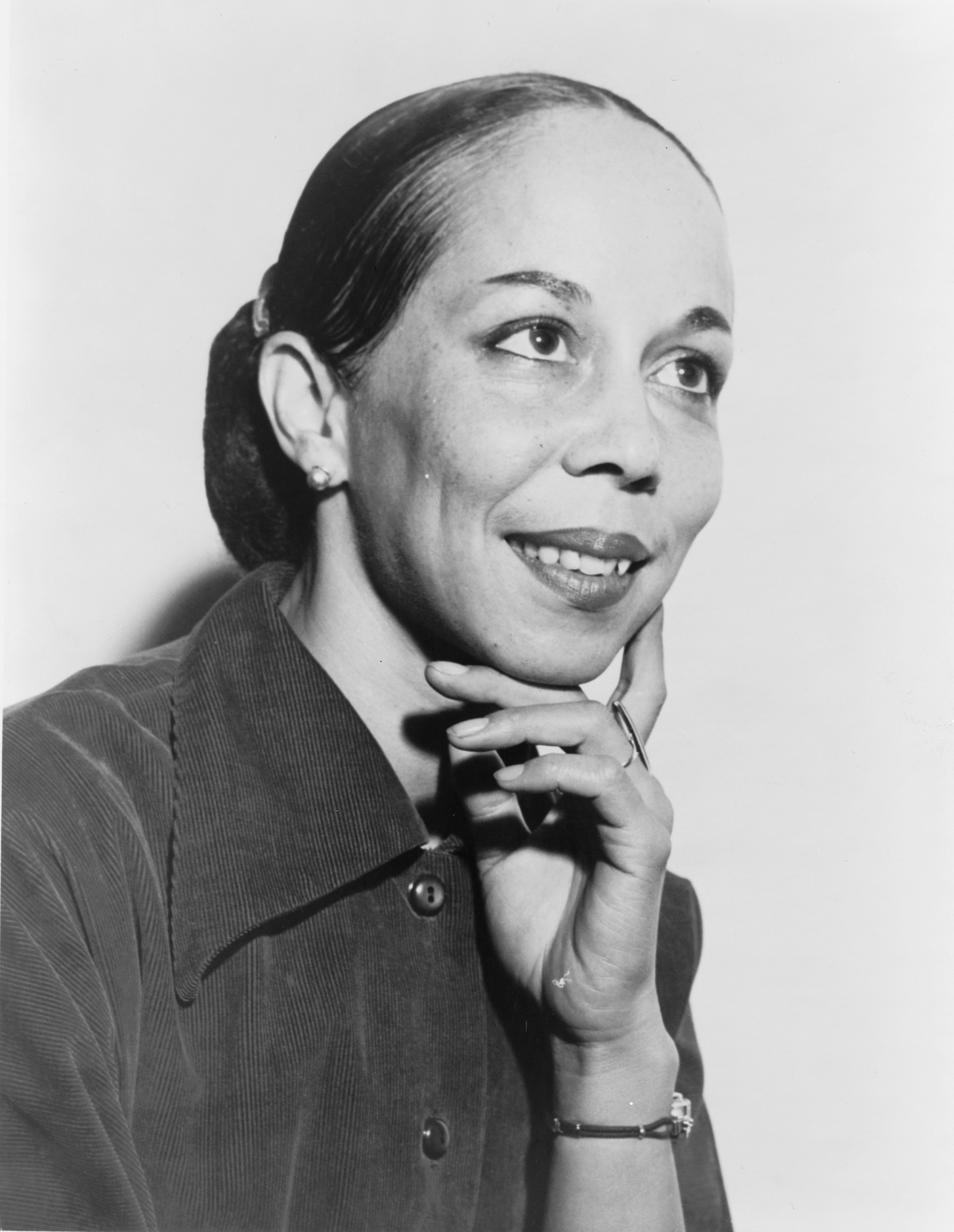
Janet Collins in 1951

Janet Faye Collins, OblSB (March 7, 1917 – May 28, 2003) was an African American prima ballerina, choreographer, and teacher. She performed on Broadway, in films, and appeared frequently on television. She was among the pioneers of black ballet dancing, one of the few classically trained Black dancers of her generation. She was a vowed oblate of the Benedictine order.

== Biography ==
Janet Faye Collins was born in New Orleans, and at the age of four moved with her family to Los Angeles, California, where Collins received her first dance training at a Catholic community center. She studied primarily with Carmelita Maracci, Lester Horton, and Adolph Bolm, who were among the few ballet teachers who accepted black students. She also had fond memories of studying with Los Angeles dance teacher Dorothy Lyndall.

In 1932, aged 16, Collins auditioned with success for the prestigious Ballet Russe de Monte Carlo, but as she was required to paint her face and skin white in order to be able to perform, she did not join the company. In the 1940s, Collins collaborated with well-known dancer Katherine Dunham and joined the Dunham Company. A turning point in her dance career came in November 1948, when she performed in a one-night program at the Las Palmas Theater in Los Angeles. She earned excellent notices. In 1948, she moved to New York and got the chance to dance her own choreography on a shared program at the 92nd Street YMHA.

In 1949, Collins earned glowing reviews in a variety of performances, including the Broadway production of Cole Porter's musical Out of This World for which she received the Donaldson Award for best dancer on Broadway in 1951. It was in that role that she was noticed by Zachary Solov, then the ballet master of the Met.

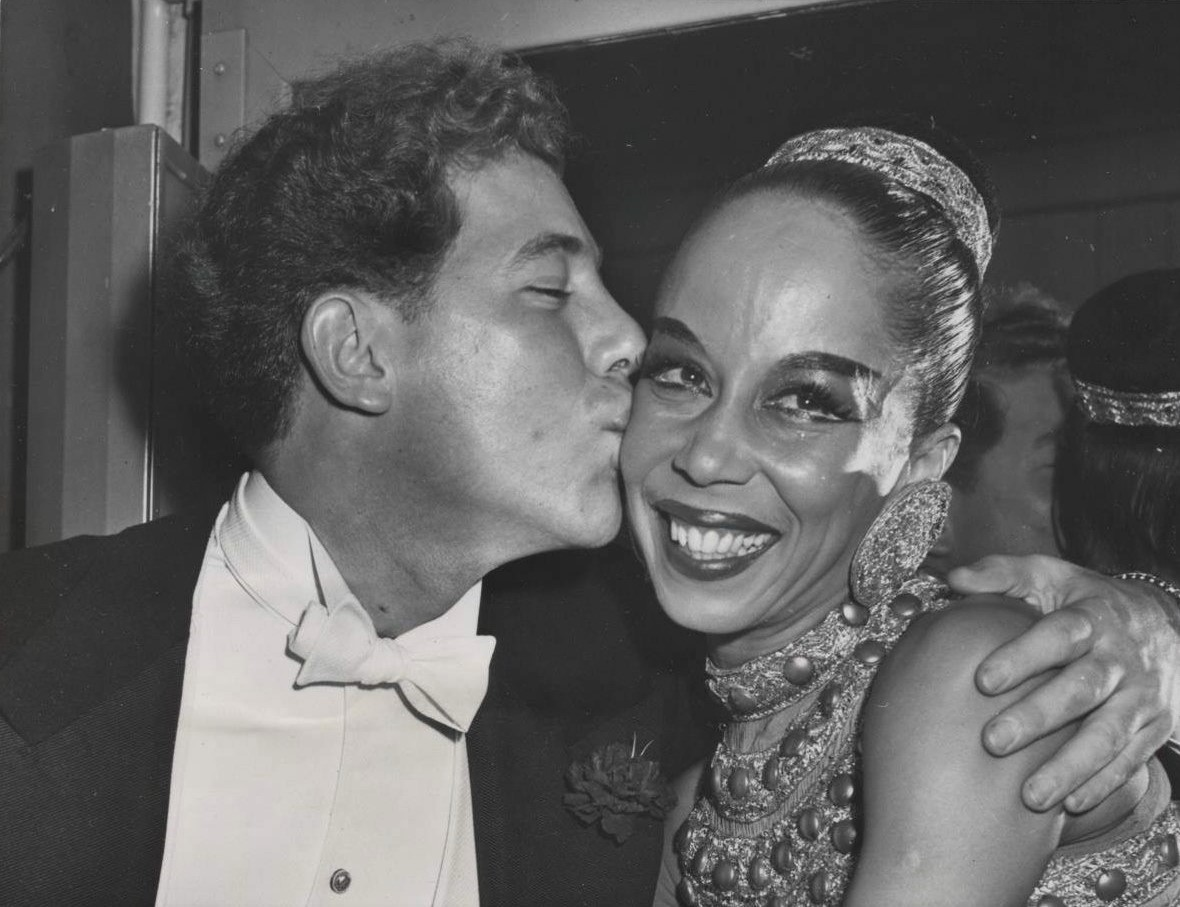
Janet Collins receiving a kiss from ballet master Zachary Solov after her performance in Aida, Nov. 1951

She also performed in Aida, Carmen, and was the first Black ballerina to perform at the Metropolitan Opera in 1951 which she joined the next year and performed at until 1955. In later life Collins taught modern dance at Balanchine's School of American Ballet in New York City, and at Marymount Manhattan College in New York City from 1951 until 1972. In 1974, Collins retired from performing and teaching, devoting herself to her Catholic religion and finding comfort as an oblate in the Benedictine Order. She was also an accomplished painter.

In failing health, she moved to Fort Worth from Seattle in 2000 to be closer to her brother, Ernest Patrick Collins, who survives her, as does her sister, Betty Wilkerson of Pasadena, Calif. Janet Collins died in 2003 at the age of 86, in Fort Worth, Texas.

== Legacy ==
Janet Collins' dance reputation today resides primarily in her role in breaking the color barrier; the constraints on Black classical dancers were too strong for her to have a vibrant performing career. In some Southern cities, race laws kept her off the stage, and her parts were played by understudies. After a performance in Toronto, Dance Magazine reported some years ago, she and a colleague approached the door of an obviously crowded restaurant only to be turned away with the curt statement that the establishment was closed.

In 1974, the Alvin Ailey American Dance Theater paid homage to her and Pearl Primus as pioneering black women in dance. Collins received a Candace Award from the National Coalition of 100 Black Women in 1989. In 2007, in recognition of Collins' great work and dedication, her renowned cousin Carmen De Lavallade established the Janet Collins Fellowship to honor aspiring talented ballet dancers.
