= Carlos Calderón Fajardo =

Peruvian journalist and writer

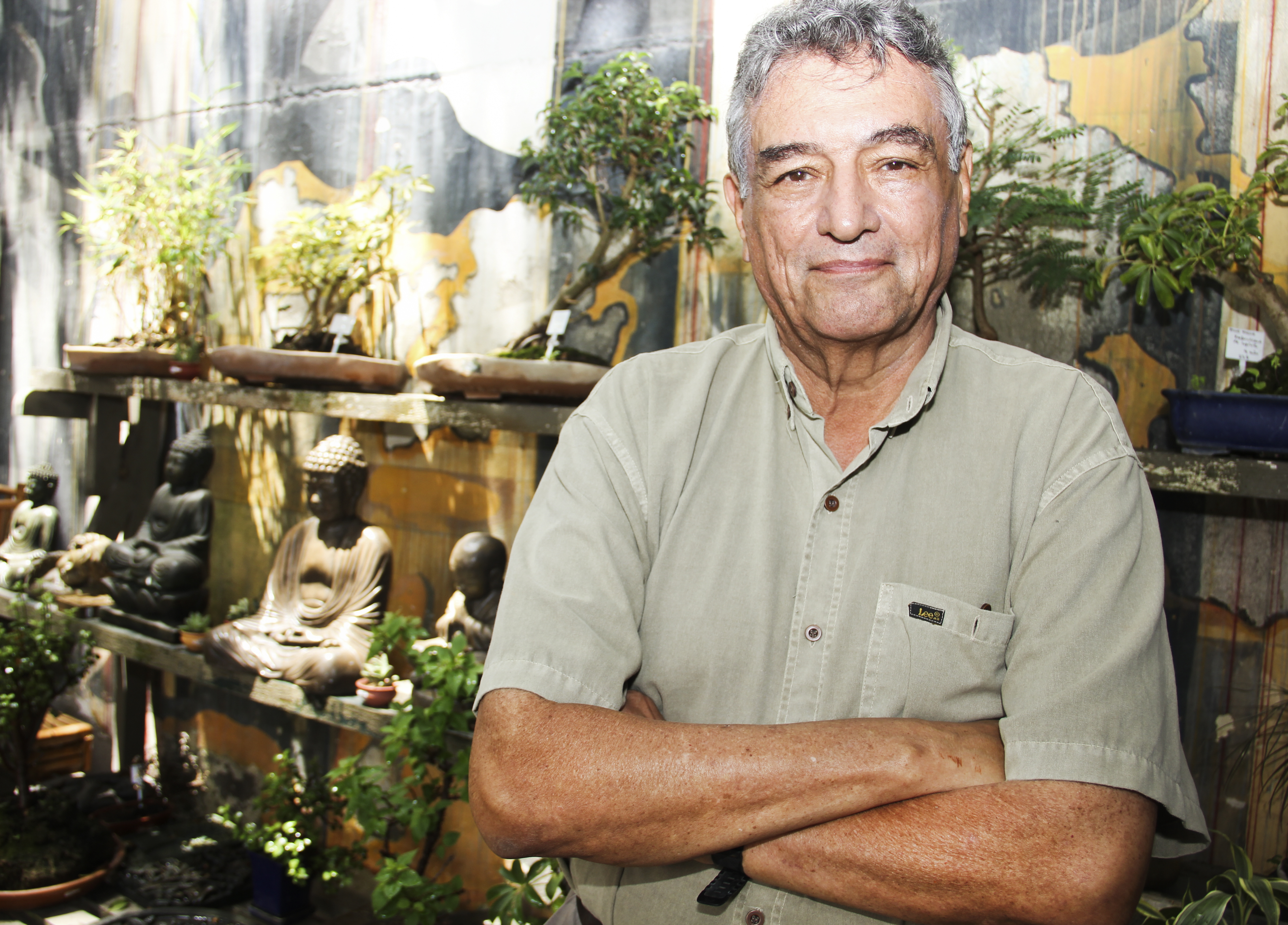

Carlos Calderón Fajardo (1946–2015) was a Peruvian journalist, novelist, and short story writer. He worked as a sociologist at the Pontifical Catholic University of Peru.

== Biography ==
In 1974 he won first place in the José María Arguedas Story Contest. In 1981 he won the Unanue Novel Competition with his novel La colina de los árboles. In 1984 he won the Gaviota Roja Novel Prize for Así es la pena en el paraíso. In 1985 he won the Hispamérica Best Short Story Prize, organized by the University of Maryland, with Roa Bastos, Mario Vargas Llosa and Julio Cortázar as judges. In the year 2006 he was a finalist for the Tusquets Award for his novel El fantasma nostálgico.

His stories have been included in many Peruvian-short-story anthologies edited in Peru, France and Germany. He taught at the National Engineering University for 25 years. From 2006 he began to publish two or three books a year. At the time of his death he was writing full-time, half the year at his home in Punta Negra and the other half in Lima.
