= 1970 FIFA World Cup squads =

Football squad members

Below are the squads for the 1970 FIFA World Cup final tournament in Mexico. Sweden (7), West Germany (2) and Czechoslovakia (1) had players representing foreign clubs.

== Group 1 ==
=== Mexico ===
Head coach: Raúl Cárdenas

No.	Pos.	Player	Date of birth (age)	Caps	Club
1	GK	Ignacio Calderón	13 December 1943 (aged 26)	40	(Mexico) Guadalajara
2	DF	Juan Manuel Alejandrez	17 May 1944 (aged 26)	24	(Mexico) Cruz Azul
3	DF	Gustavo Peña (captain)	22 November 1941 (aged 28)	63	(Mexico) Cruz Azul
4	DF	Francisco Montes	22 April 1943 (aged 27)	7	(Mexico) Veracruz
5	DF	Mario Pérez	30 July 1946 (aged 23)	45	(Mexico) Club América
6	DF	Guillermo Hernández	25 June 1942 (aged 27)	26	(Mexico) Club América
7	MF	Marcos Rivas	25 November 1947 (aged 22)	5	(Mexico) Atlante
8	MF	Antonio Munguía	27 June 1942 (aged 27)	33	(Mexico) Cruz Azul
9	FW	Enrique Borja	30 December 1945 (aged 24)	37	(Mexico) Club América
10	FW	Horacio López Salgado	15 September 1948 (aged 21)	15	(Mexico) Club América
11	FW	Aarón Padilla	10 July 1942 (aged 27)	51	(Mexico) Pumas UNAM
12	GK	Antonio Mota	26 January 1939 (aged 31)	13	(Mexico) Necaxa
13	DF	José Vantolrá	30 March 1943 (aged 27)	26	(Mexico) Toluca
14	DF	Javier Guzmán	9 January 1945 (aged 25)	9	(Mexico) Cruz Azul
15	MF	Héctor Pulido	20 December 1942 (aged 27)	24	(Mexico) Cruz Azul
16	FW	Isidoro Díaz	14 March 1938 (aged 32)	67	(Mexico) León
17	MF	José Luis González	14 September 1942 (aged 27)	36	(Mexico) Pumas UNAM
18	MF	Mario Velarde	29 March 1940 (aged 30)	2	(Mexico) Pumas UNAM
19	FW	Javier Valdivia	4 December 1941 (aged 28)	16	(Mexico) Guadalajara
20	MF	Juan Ignacio Basaguren	21 July 1944 (aged 25)	10	(Mexico) Atlante
21	FW	Javier Fragoso	19 April 1942 (aged 28)	43	(Mexico) Club América
22	GK	Francisco Castrejón	11 June 1947 (aged 22)	13	(Mexico) Pumas UNAM

Alberto Onofre withdrew from the squad on 27 May due to suffering a broken leg on training; Marcos Rivas was called up in his place.

=== Soviet Union ===
Head coach: Gavril Kachalin

No.	Pos.	Player	Date of birth (age)	Caps	Club
1	GK	Leonid Shmuts	8 October 1948 (aged 21)	0	(Soviet Union) CSKA Moscow
2	GK	Anzor Kavazashvili	19 July 1940 (aged 29)	25	(Soviet Union) Spartak Moscow
3	DF	Valentin Afonin	22 December 1939 (aged 30)	38	(Soviet Union) SKA Rostov
4	DF	Revaz Dzodzuashvili	15 April 1945 (aged 25)	10	(Soviet Union) Dinamo Tbilisi
5	DF	Vladimir Kaplichny	26 February 1944 (aged 26)	22	(Soviet Union) CSKA Moscow
6	DF	Evgeny Lovchev	29 January 1949 (aged 21)	10	(Soviet Union) Spartak Moscow
7	DF	Gennady Logofet	15 April 1942 (aged 28)	15	(Soviet Union) Spartak Moscow
8	DF	Murtaz Khurtsilava	5 January 1943 (aged 27)	39	(Soviet Union) Dinamo Tbilisi
9	DF	Albert Shesternyov (captain)	20 June 1941 (aged 28)	74	(Soviet Union) CSKA Moscow
10	MF	Valery Zykov	24 February 1944 (aged 26)	1	(Soviet Union) Dynamo Moscow
11	MF	Kakhi Asatiani	1 January 1947 (aged 23)	10	(Soviet Union) Dinamo Tbilisi
12	MF	Nikolay Kiselyov	29 January 1946 (aged 24)	8	(Soviet Union) Spartak Moscow
13	GK	Lev Yashin	22 October 1929 (aged 40)	74	(Soviet Union) Dynamo Moscow
14	MF	Vladimir Muntyan	14 September 1946 (aged 23)	13	(Soviet Union) Dynamo Kyiv
15	MF	Viktor Serebryanikov	29 March 1940 (aged 30)	19	(Soviet Union) Dynamo Kyiv
16	FW	Anatoliy Byshovets	23 April 1946 (aged 24)	29	(Soviet Union) Dynamo Kyiv
17	FW	Gennady Yevriuzhikin	4 February 1944 (aged 26)	13	(Soviet Union) Dynamo Moscow
18	FW	Slava Metreveli	30 May 1936 (aged 34)	48	(Soviet Union) Dinamo Tbilisi
19	FW	Givi Nodia	2 January 1948 (aged 22)	10	(Soviet Union) Dinamo Tbilisi
20	FW	Anatoliy Puzach	3 June 1941 (aged 28)	10	(Soviet Union) Dynamo Kyiv
21	FW	Vitaly Khmelnitsky	12 June 1943 (aged 26)	13	(Soviet Union) Dynamo Kyiv
22	FW	Valeriy Porkujan	4 October 1944 (aged 25)	8	(Soviet Union) Chornomorets Odesa

=== Belgium ===
Head coach: Raymond Goethals

No.	Pos.	Player	Date of birth (age)	Caps	Club
1	GK	Christian Piot	4 October 1947 (aged 22)	2	(Belgium) Standard Liège
2	DF	Georges Heylens	8 August 1941 (aged 28)	47	(Belgium) Anderlecht
3	DF	Jean Thissen	21 April 1946 (aged 24)	12	(Belgium) Standard Liège
4	DF	Nicolas Dewalque	20 September 1945 (aged 24)	12	(Belgium) Standard Liège
5	DF	Léon Jeck	9 February 1947 (aged 23)	7	(Belgium) Standard Liège
6	MF	Jean Dockx	24 May 1941 (aged 29)	10	(Belgium) RWD Molenbeek
7	MF	Léon Semmeling	4 January 1940 (aged 30)	15	(Belgium) Standard Liège
8	MF	Wilfried Van Moer	1 March 1945 (aged 25)	15	(Belgium) Standard Liège
9	FW	Johan Devrindt	14 April 1944 (aged 26)	14	(Belgium) Anderlecht
10	FW	Paul Van Himst (captain)	2 October 1943 (aged 26)	53	(Belgium) Anderlecht
11	FW	Wilfried Puis	18 February 1943 (aged 27)	40	(Belgium) Anderlecht
12	GK	Jean-Marie Trappeniers	13 January 1942 (aged 28)	11	(Belgium) Anderlecht
13	DF	Jacques Beurlet	21 December 1944 (aged 25)	3	(Belgium) Standard Liège
14	MF	Maurice Martens	5 June 1947 (aged 22)	0	(Belgium) Anderlecht
15	MF	Erwin Vandendaele	5 March 1945 (aged 25)	0	(Belgium) Club Brugge
16	MF	Odilon Polleunis	1 May 1943 (aged 27)	11	(Belgium) Sint-Truiden
17	MF	Jan Verheyen	9 July 1944 (aged 25)	10	(Belgium) Beerschot
18	FW	Raoul Lambert	20 October 1944 (aged 25)	4	(Belgium) Club Brugge
19	FW	Pierre Carteus	24 September 1943 (aged 26)	0	(Belgium) Club Brugge
20	MF	Alfons Peeters	21 January 1943 (aged 27)	4	(Belgium) Anderlecht
21	FW	Frans Janssens	25 September 1945 (aged 24)	0	(Belgium) Lierse
22	GK	Jacques Duquesne	22 April 1940 (aged 30)	0	(Belgium) Olympic Charleroi

=== El Salvador ===
Head coach: (Chile) Hernán Carrasco

No.	Pos.	Player	Date of birth (age)	Caps	Club
1	GK	Raúl Magaña	24 February 1940 (aged 30)	0	(El Salvador) FAS
2	DF	Roberto Rivas	17 July 1941 (aged 28)	3	(El Salvador) Alianza
3	DF	Salvador Mariona (captain)	16 December 1943 (aged 26)	0	(El Salvador) Alianza
4	DF	Santiago Cortés	19 January 1945 (aged 25)	0	(El Salvador) Atlético Marte
5	DF	Saturnino Osorio	6 January 1945 (aged 25)	0	(El Salvador) Águila
6	MF	José Quintanilla	29 October 1947 (aged 22)	3	(El Salvador) Atlético Marte
7	MF	Mauricio Rodríguez	12 September 1945 (aged 24)	3	(El Salvador) Universidad
8	MF	Jorge Vásquez	23 April 1945 (aged 25)	3	(El Salvador) Universidad
9	MF	Juan Ramón Martínez	20 April 1948 (aged 22)	3	(El Salvador) Águila
10	FW	Salvador Cabezas	28 February 1947 (aged 23)	2	(El Salvador) ADLER
11	FW	Ernesto Aparicio	28 December 1948 (aged 21)	0	(El Salvador) Atlético Marte
12	FW	Mario Monge	27 November 1938 (aged 31)	0	(El Salvador) FAS
13	GK	Tomás Pineda	21 January 1946 (aged 24)	?	(El Salvador) Juventud Olimpica
14	DF	Mauricio Manzano	30 September 1943 (aged 26)	0	(El Salvador) FAS
15	FW	David Cabrera	12 September 1945 (aged 24)	?	(El Salvador) FAS
16	MF	Genaro Sermeño	28 November 1948 (aged 21)	0	(El Salvador) FAS
17	FW	Jaime Portillo	18 September 1947 (aged 22)	0	(El Salvador) Alianza
18	DF	Guillermo Castro	25 June 1940 (aged 29)	2	(El Salvador) Atlético Marte
19	MF	Sergio Méndez	14 February 1942 (aged 28)	3	(El Salvador) Atlético Marte
20	GK	Gualberto Fernández	12 July 1941 (aged 28)	3	(El Salvador) Atlante San Alejo
21	FW	Elmer Acevedo	24 February 1946 (aged 24)	1	(El Salvador) FAS
22	MF	Alberto Villalta	19 November 1947 (aged 22)	2	(El Salvador) Atlético Marte

== Group 2 ==
=== Italy ===
Head coach: Ferruccio Valcareggi

No.	Pos.	Player	Date of birth (age)	Caps	Club
1	GK	Enrico Albertosi	2 November 1939 (aged 30)	21	(Italy) Cagliari
2	DF	Tarcisio Burgnich	25 April 1939 (aged 31)	33	(Italy) Internazionale
3	DF	Giacinto Facchetti (captain)	18 July 1942 (aged 27)	46	(Italy) Internazionale
4	DF	Fabrizio Poletti	13 July 1943 (aged 26)	4	(Italy) Torino
5	DF	Pierluigi Cera	25 February 1941 (aged 29)	2	(Italy) Cagliari
6	MF	Ugo Ferrante	18 July 1945 (aged 24)	1	(Italy) Fiorentina
7	MF	Comunardo Niccolai	15 December 1946 (aged 23)	1	(Italy) Cagliari
8	DF	Roberto Rosato	18 August 1943 (aged 26)	18	(Italy) Milan
9	DF	Giorgio Puia	8 March 1938 (aged 32)	7	(Italy) Torino
10	MF	Mario Bertini	7 January 1944 (aged 26)	9	(Italy) Internazionale
11	FW	Gigi Riva	7 November 1944 (aged 25)	16	(Italy) Cagliari
12	GK	Dino Zoff	28 February 1942 (aged 28)	10	(Italy) Napoli
13	FW	Angelo Domenghini	25 August 1941 (aged 28)	22	(Italy) Cagliari
14	MF	Gianni Rivera	18 August 1943 (aged 26)	38	(Italy) Milan
15	MF	Sandro Mazzola	8 November 1942 (aged 27)	37	(Italy) Internazionale
16	MF	Giancarlo De Sisti	13 March 1943 (aged 27)	12	(Italy) Fiorentina
17	GK	Lido Vieri	16 July 1939 (aged 30)	4	(Italy) Internazionale
18	DF	Antonio Juliano	26 December 1942 (aged 27)	14	(Italy) Napoli
19	FW	Sergio Gori	24 February 1946 (aged 24)	0	(Italy) Cagliari
20	FW	Roberto Boninsegna	13 November 1943 (aged 26)	1	(Italy) Internazionale
21	DF	Giuseppe Furino	5 July 1946 (aged 23)	0	(Italy) Juventus
22	FW	Pierino Prati	13 December 1946 (aged 23)	6	(Italy) Milan

=== Sweden ===
Head coach: Orvar Bergmark

No.	Pos.	Player	Date of birth (age)	Caps	Club
1	GK	Ronnie Hellström	21 February 1949 (aged 21)	12	(Sweden) Hammarby IF
2	DF	Hans Selander	15 March 1945 (aged 25)	28	(Sweden) Helsingborgs IF
3	DF	Kurt Axelsson	10 November 1941 (aged 28)	22	(Belgium) Club Brugge
4	DF	Björn Nordqvist (captain)	6 October 1942 (aged 27)	43	(Sweden) IFK Norrköping
5	DF	Roland Grip	1 January 1941 (aged 29)	21	(Sweden) AIK
6	MF	Tommy Svensson	4 March 1945 (aged 25)	23	(Sweden) Östers IF
7	MF	Bo Larsson	5 May 1944 (aged 26)	22	(Sweden) Malmö FF
8	MF	Leif Eriksson	20 March 1942 (aged 28)	40	(Sweden) Örebro SK
9	FW	Ove Kindvall	16 May 1943 (aged 27)	15	(Netherlands) Feyenoord
10	FW	Ove Grahn	9 May 1943 (aged 27)	14	(Switzerland) Grasshopper
11	MF	Örjan Persson	27 August 1942 (aged 27)	28	(Scotland) Rangers
12	GK	Sven-Gunnar Larsson	10 May 1940 (aged 30)	14	(Sweden) Örebro SK
13	DF	Claes Cronqvist	15 October 1944 (aged 25)	2	(Sweden) Djurgårdens IF
14	DF	Krister Kristensson	25 July 1942 (aged 27)	19	(Sweden) Malmö FF
15	DF	Leif Målberg	1 September 1945 (aged 24)	0	(Sweden) IF Elfsborg
16	FW	Tomas Nordahl	24 May 1946 (aged 24)	8	(Belgium) Anderlecht
17	GK	Ronney Pettersson	26 April 1940 (aged 30)	17	(Sweden) Djurgårdens IF
18	FW	Tom Turesson	17 May 1942 (aged 28)	18	(Belgium) Club Brugge
19	MF	Göran Nicklasson	20 August 1942 (aged 27)	4	(Sweden) IFK Göteborg
20	DF	Jan Olsson	18 March 1944 (aged 26)	11	(Germany) VfB Stuttgart
21	FW	Inge Ejderstedt	24 December 1946 (aged 23)	15	(Sweden) Östers IF
22	MF	Sten Pålsson	4 December 1945 (aged 24)	7	(Sweden) GAIS

=== Uruguay ===
Head coach: Juan Hohberg

No.	Pos.	Player	Date of birth (age)	Caps	Club
1	GK	Ladislao Mazurkiewicz	14 February 1945 (aged 25)	27	(Uruguay) Peñarol
2	DF	Atilio Ancheta	19 July 1948 (aged 21)	10	(Uruguay) Nacional
3	DF	Roberto Matosas	11 May 1940 (aged 30)	12	(Uruguay) Peñarol
4	DF	Luis Ubiña	7 June 1940 (aged 29)	19	(Uruguay) Nacional
5	MF	Julio Montero Castillo	25 April 1944 (aged 26)	22	(Uruguay) Nacional
6	DF	Juan Mujica	22 December 1943 (aged 26)	16	(Uruguay) Nacional
7	FW	Luis Cubilla	28 March 1940 (aged 30)	23	(Uruguay) Nacional
8	MF	Pedro Rocha (captain)	3 December 1942 (aged 27)	48	(Uruguay) Peñarol
9	MF	Víctor Espárrago	6 October 1944 (aged 25)	15	(Uruguay) Nacional
10	MF	Ildo Maneiro	4 August 1947 (aged 22)	3	(Uruguay) Nacional
11	FW	Julio Morales	16 February 1945 (aged 25)	11	(Uruguay) Nacional
12	GK	Héctor Santos	29 October 1944 (aged 25)	1	(Uruguay) Bella Vista
13	DF	Rodolfo Sandoval	4 October 1948 (aged 21)	0	(Uruguay) Peñarol
14	DF	Francisco Cámera	1 January 1944 (aged 26)	1	(Uruguay) Bella Vista
15	MF	Dagoberto Fontes	6 June 1943 (aged 26)	9	(Uruguay) Defensor
16	DF	Omar Caetano	8 November 1938 (aged 31)	30	(Uruguay) Peñarol
17	FW	Rúben Bareño	23 January 1944 (aged 26)	12	(Uruguay) Cerro
18	FW	Alberto Gómez	10 June 1944 (aged 25)	3	(Uruguay) Liverpool
19	FW	Oscar Zubia	8 February 1946 (aged 24)	11	(Uruguay) River Plate
20	MF	Julio César Cortés	29 March 1941 (aged 29)	24	(Uruguay) Peñarol
21	FW	Julio Losada	16 June 1950 (aged 19)	3	(Uruguay) Peñarol
22	GK	Walter Corbo	2 May 1949 (aged 21)	0	(Uruguay) Peñarol

=== Israel ===
Head coach: Emmanuel Scheffer

No.	Pos.	Player	Date of birth (age)	Caps	Club
1	GK	Yitzchak Vissoker	18 September 1944 (aged 25)	17	(Israel) Hapoel Petah Tikva
2	DF	Shraga Bar	24 March 1948 (aged 22)	13	(Israel) Maccabi Netanya
3	DF	Menachem Bello	26 December 1947 (aged 22)	25	(Israel) Maccabi Tel Aviv
4	MF	David Primo	5 May 1946 (aged 24)	18	(Israel) Hapoel Tel Aviv
5	DF	Zvi Rosen	23 June 1947 (aged 22)	16	(Israel) Maccabi Tel Aviv
6	DF	Shmuel Rosenthal	22 April 1947 (aged 23)	23	(Israel) Hapoel Petah Tikva
7	MF	Itzhak Shum	1 September 1948 (aged 21)	8	(Israel) Hapoel Kfar Saba
8	FW	Giora Spiegel	27 July 1947 (aged 22)	19	(Israel) Maccabi Tel Aviv
9	FW	Yehoshua Feigenbaum	5 December 1947 (aged 22)	15	(Israel) Hapoel Tel Aviv
10	FW	Mordechai Spiegler (captain)	19 August 1944 (aged 25)	36	(Israel) Maccabi Netanya
11	MF	George Borba	12 July 1944 (aged 25)	10	(Israel) Hapoel Tel Aviv
12	MF	Yisha'ayahu Schwager	10 February 1946 (aged 24)	6	(Israel) Maccabi Haifa
13	FW	Yechezekel Chazom	1 January 1947 (aged 23)	4	(Israel) Hapoel Tel Aviv
14	MF	Danny Shmulevich-Rom	29 November 1940 (aged 29)	24	(Israel) Maccabi Haifa
15	FW	Rachamim Talbi	17 May 1943 (aged 27)	25	(Israel) Maccabi Tel Aviv
16	DF	Yochanan Vollach	14 May 1945 (aged 25)	4	(Israel) Hapoel Haifa
17	FW	Eli Ben Rimoz	20 November 1944 (aged 25)	2	(Israel) Hapoel Jerusalem
18	MF	Moshe Romano	6 May 1946 (aged 24)	6	(Israel) Shimshon Tel Aviv
19	MF	Roni Shuruk	24 February 1946 (aged 24)	8	(Israel) Hakoah Maccabi Ramat Gan
20	DF	David Karako	11 February 1945 (aged 25)	6	(Israel) Maccabi Tel Aviv
21	GK	Yechiel Hameiri	20 August 1946 (aged 23)	1	(Israel) Hapoel Haifa
22	GK	Yair Nossovsky	29 June 1937 (aged 32)	3	(Israel) Hapoel Kfar Saba

== Group 3 ==
=== Brazil ===
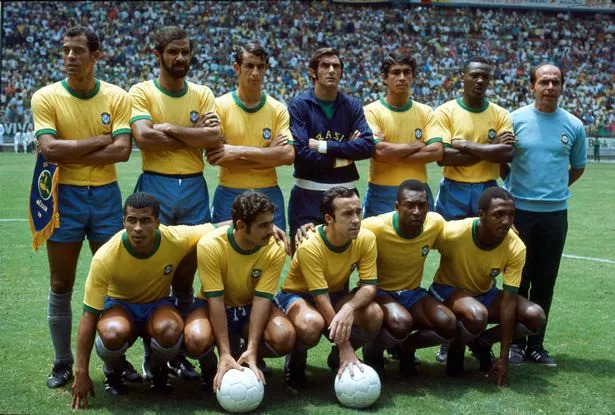
The Brazil squad for the 1970 FIFA World Cup.

Head coach: Mário Zagallo

No.	Pos.	Player	Date of birth (age)	Caps	Club
1	GK	Félix	24 December 1937 (aged 32)	23	(Brazil) Fluminense
2	DF	Brito	9 August 1939 (aged 30)	28	(Brazil) Flamengo
3	MF	Piazza	25 February 1943 (aged 27)	16	(Brazil) Cruzeiro
4	DF	Carlos Alberto (captain)	17 July 1944 (aged 25)	40	(Brazil) Santos
5	MF	Clodoaldo	26 September 1949 (aged 20)	7	(Brazil) Santos
6	DF	Marco Antônio	6 February 1951 (aged 19)	7	(Brazil) Fluminense
7	FW	Jairzinho	25 December 1944 (aged 25)	45	(Brazil) Botafogo
8	MF	Gérson	11 January 1941 (aged 29)	54	(Brazil) São Paulo
9	FW	Tostão	25 January 1947 (aged 23)	36	(Brazil) Cruzeiro
10	FW	Pelé	23 October 1940 (aged 29)	81	(Brazil) Santos
11	MF	Rivellino	1 January 1946 (aged 24)	21	(Brazil) Corinthians
12	GK	Ado	4 July 1946 (aged 23)	2	(Brazil) Corinthians
13	FW	Roberto Miranda	31 July 1944 (aged 25)	9	(Brazil) Botafogo
14	DF	Baldocchi	14 March 1946 (aged 24)	1	(Brazil) Palmeiras
15	DF	Fontana	31 December 1940 (aged 29)	6	(Brazil) Cruzeiro
16	DF	Everaldo	11 September 1944 (aged 25)	8	(Brazil) Grêmio
17	DF	Joel Camargo	18 September 1946 (aged 23)	26	(Brazil) Santos
18	MF	Paulo Cézar Caju	16 June 1949 (aged 20)	14	(Brazil) Botafogo
19	FW	Edu	6 August 1949 (aged 20)	29	(Brazil) Santos
20	FW	Dario	4 March 1946 (aged 24)	3	(Brazil) Atlético Mineiro
21	DF	Zé Maria	18 May 1949 (aged 21)	1	(Brazil) Portuguesa
22	GK	Leão	11 July 1949 (aged 20)	2	(Brazil) Palmeiras

=== England ===
Head coach: Alf Ramsey

No.	Pos.	Player	Date of birth (age)	Caps	Club
1	GK	Gordon Banks	30 December 1937 (aged 32)	59	(England) Stoke City
2	DF	Keith Newton	23 June 1941 (aged 28)	24	(England) Everton
3	DF	Terry Cooper	12 July 1944 (aged 25)	8	(England) Leeds United
4	MF	Alan Mullery	23 November 1941 (aged 28)	27	(England) Tottenham Hotspur
5	DF	Brian Labone	23 January 1940 (aged 30)	23	(England) Everton
6	DF	Bobby Moore (captain)	12 April 1941 (aged 29)	80	(England) West Ham United
7	FW	Francis Lee	29 April 1944 (aged 26)	14	(England) Manchester City
8	MF	Alan Ball	12 May 1945 (aged 25)	41	(England) Everton
9	MF	Bobby Charlton	11 October 1937 (aged 32)	102	(England) Manchester United
10	FW	Geoff Hurst	8 December 1941 (aged 28)	38	(England) West Ham United
11	MF	Martin Peters	8 November 1943 (aged 26)	38	(England) Tottenham Hotspur
12	GK	Peter Bonetti	27 September 1941 (aged 28)	6	(England) Chelsea
13	GK	Alex Stepney	18 September 1942 (aged 27)	1	(England) Manchester United
14	DF	Tommy Wright	21 October 1944 (aged 25)	9	(England) Everton
15	DF	Nobby Stiles	18 May 1942 (aged 28)	28	(England) Manchester United
16	MF	Emlyn Hughes	28 August 1947 (aged 22)	6	(England) Liverpool
17	DF	Jack Charlton	8 May 1935 (aged 35)	34	(England) Leeds United
18	DF	Norman Hunter	29 October 1943 (aged 26)	13	(England) Leeds United
19	MF	Colin Bell	26 February 1946 (aged 24)	11	(England) Manchester City
20	FW	Peter Osgood	20 February 1947 (aged 23)	1	(England) Chelsea
21	FW	Allan Clarke	31 July 1946 (aged 23)	0	(England) Leeds United
22	FW	Jeff Astle	13 May 1942 (aged 28)	3	(England) West Bromwich Albion

=== Czechoslovakia ===
Head coach: Jozef Marko

No.	Pos.	Player	Date of birth (age)	Caps	Club
1	GK	Ivo Viktor	21 May 1942 (aged 28)	19	(Czechoslovakia) VTJ Dukla Praha
2	DF	Karol Dobiaš	18 December 1947 (aged 22)	9	(Czechoslovakia) Spartak TAZ Trnava
3	DF	Václav Migas	16 September 1944 (aged 25)	4	(Czechoslovakia) TJ Sparta ČKD Praha
4	DF	Vladimír Hagara	7 November 1943 (aged 26)	10	(Czechoslovakia) Spartak TAZ Trnava
5	DF	Alexander Horváth (captain)	28 December 1938 (aged 31)	24	(Czechoslovakia) TJ Slovan CHZJD
6	FW	Andrej Kvašňák	19 May 1936 (aged 34)	45	(Belgium) RFC Malinois
7	MF	Bohumil Veselý	18 June 1945 (aged 24)	13	(Czechoslovakia) TJ Sparta ČKD Praha
8	FW	Ladislav Petráš	1 December 1946 (aged 23)	1	(Czechoslovakia) TJ Internacionál Slovnaft
9	MF	Ladislav Kuna	3 April 1947 (aged 23)	22	(Czechoslovakia) Spartak TAZ Trnava
10	FW	Jozef Adamec	26 February 1942 (aged 28)	30	(Czechoslovakia) Spartak TAZ Trnava
11	FW	Karol Jokl	29 August 1945 (aged 24)	18	(Czechoslovakia) TJ Slovan CHZJD
12	DF	Ján Pivarník	13 November 1947 (aged 22)	6	(Czechoslovakia) VSS Košice
13	GK	Anton Flešár	8 May 1944 (aged 26)	1	(Czechoslovakia) Lokomotíva Košice
14	DF	Vladimír Hrivnák	23 April 1945 (aged 25)	4	(Czechoslovakia) TJ Slovan CHZJD
15	DF	Ján Zlocha	24 March 1942 (aged 28)	3	(Czechoslovakia) TJ Slovan CHZJD
16	MF	Ivan Hrdlička	20 November 1943 (aged 26)	13	(Czechoslovakia) TJ Slovan CHZJD
17	MF	Jaroslav Pollák	11 July 1947 (aged 22)	5	(Czechoslovakia) VSS Košice
18	FW	František Veselý	7 December 1943 (aged 26)	16	(Czechoslovakia) Slavia Prague
19	MF	Josef Jurkanin	5 March 1949 (aged 21)	8	(Czechoslovakia) TJ Sparta ČKD Praha
20	FW	Milan Albrecht	16 July 1950 (aged 19)	2	(Czechoslovakia) Jednota Trenčín
21	FW	Ján Čapkovič	11 January 1948 (aged 22)	4	(Czechoslovakia) TJ Slovan CHZJD
22	GK	Alexander Vencel	8 February 1944 (aged 26)	12	(Czechoslovakia) TJ Slovan CHZJD

=== Romania ===
Head coach: Angelo Niculescu

No.	Pos.	Player	Date of birth (age)	Caps	Club
1	GK	Necula Răducanu	10 May 1946 (aged 24)	9	(Romania) Rapid București
2	DF	Lajos Sătmăreanu	21 February 1944 (aged 26)	20	(Romania) Steaua București
3	DF	Nicolae Lupescu	17 December 1940 (aged 29)	7	(Romania) Rapid București
4	DF	Mihai Mocanu	24 February 1942 (aged 28)	25	(Romania) Petrolul Ploiești
5	DF	Cornel Dinu	2 August 1948 (aged 21)	16	(Romania) Dinamo București
6	DF	Dan Coe	8 September 1941 (aged 28)	39	(Romania) Rapid București
7	FW	Emerich Dembrovschi	6 October 1945 (aged 24)	11	(Romania) Dinamo Bacău
8	MF	Nicolae Dobrin	26 August 1947 (aged 22)	24	(Romania) Argeș Pitești
9	FW	Florea Dumitrache	22 May 1948 (aged 22)	13	(Romania) Dinamo București
10	MF	Radu Nunweiller	16 November 1944 (aged 25)	14	(Romania) Dinamo București
11	FW	Mircea Lucescu (captain)	29 July 1945 (aged 24)	25	(Romania) Dinamo București
12	DF	Mihai Ivăncescu	22 March 1942 (aged 28)	0	(Romania) Steagul Roșu Brașov
13	DF	Augustin Deleanu	23 August 1944 (aged 25)	11	(Romania) Dinamo București
14	MF	Vasile Gergely	28 October 1941 (aged 28)	35	(Romania) Dinamo București
15	MF	Ion Dumitru	2 January 1950 (aged 20)	3	(Romania) Rapid București
16	FW	Alexandru Neagu	19 July 1948 (aged 21)	4	(Romania) Rapid București
17	MF	Gheorghe Tătaru	5 May 1948 (aged 22)	0	(Romania) Steaua București
18	FW	Marin Tufan	14 October 1942 (aged 27)	2	(Romania) Farul Constanța
19	FW	Flavius Domide	11 May 1946 (aged 24)	6	(Romania) UTA Arad
20	MF	Nicolae Pescaru	27 March 1943 (aged 27)	1	(Romania) Steagul Roșu Brașov
21	GK	Stere Adamache	17 August 1941 (aged 28)	2	(Romania) Steagul Roșu Brașov
22	GK	Gheorghe Gornea	2 August 1944 (aged 25)	4	(Romania) UTA Arad

== Group 4 ==
=== West Germany ===
Head coach: Helmut Schön

No.	Pos.	Player	Date of birth (age)	Caps	Club
1	GK	Sepp Maier	28 February 1944 (aged 26)	19	(West Germany) Bayern Munich
2	DF	Horst-Dieter Höttges	10 September 1943 (aged 26)	39	(West Germany) Werder Bremen
3	DF	Karl-Heinz Schnellinger	31 March 1939 (aged 31)	41	(Italy) Milan
4	MF	Franz Beckenbauer	11 September 1945 (aged 24)	38	(West Germany) Bayern Munich
5	DF	Willi Schulz	4 October 1938 (aged 31)	63	(West Germany) Hamburger SV
6	MF	Wolfgang Weber	26 June 1944 (aged 25)	37	(West Germany) 1. FC Köln
7	DF	Berti Vogts	30 December 1946 (aged 23)	24	(West Germany) Borussia Mönchengladbach
8	FW	Helmut Haller	21 July 1939 (aged 30)	32	(Italy) Juventus
9	FW	Uwe Seeler (captain)	5 November 1936 (aged 33)	65	(West Germany) Hamburger SV
10	FW	Sigfried Held	7 August 1942 (aged 27)	27	(West Germany) Borussia Dortmund
11	DF	Klaus Fichtel	19 November 1944 (aged 25)	13	(West Germany) Schalke 04
12	MF	Wolfgang Overath	29 September 1943 (aged 26)	49	(West Germany) 1. FC Köln
13	FW	Gerd Müller	3 November 1945 (aged 24)	19	(West Germany) Bayern Munich
14	FW	Reinhard Libuda	10 October 1943 (aged 26)	15	(West Germany) Schalke 04
15	DF	Bernd Patzke	14 March 1943 (aged 27)	19	(West Germany) Hertha BSC
16	MF	Max Lorenz	19 August 1939 (aged 30)	18	(West Germany) Eintracht Braunschweig
17	FW	Hannes Löhr	5 July 1942 (aged 27)	13	(West Germany) 1. FC Köln
18	DF	Klaus-Dieter Sieloff	27 February 1942 (aged 28)	9	(West Germany) Borussia Mönchengladbach
19	MF	Peter Dietrich	6 March 1944 (aged 26)	1	(West Germany) Borussia Mönchengladbach
20	FW	Jürgen Grabowski	7 July 1944 (aged 25)	7	(West Germany) Eintracht Frankfurt
21	GK	Manfred Manglitz	8 March 1940 (aged 30)	4	(West Germany) 1. FC Köln
22	GK	Horst Wolter	8 June 1942 (aged 27)	12	(West Germany) Eintracht Braunschweig

=== Peru ===
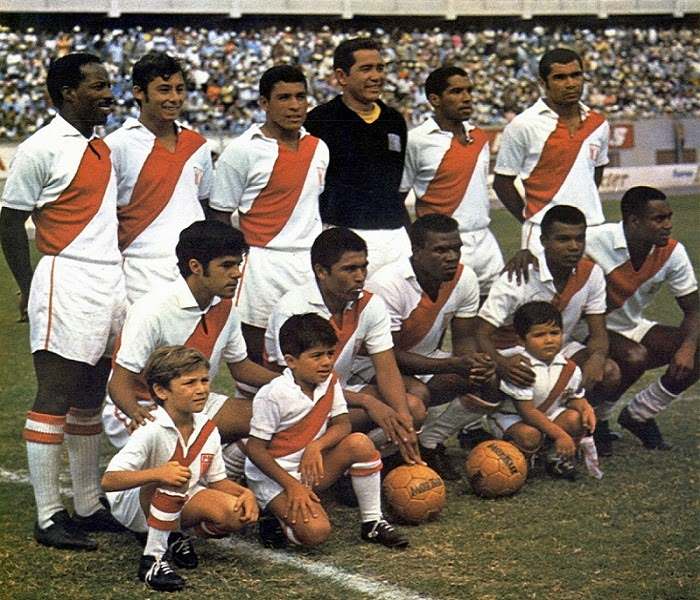
The Peru squad for the 1970 FIFA World Cup.

Head coach: (Brazil) Didi

No.	Pos.	Player	Date of birth (age)	Caps	Club
1	GK	Luis Rubiños	31 December 1940 (aged 29)	3	(Peru) Sporting Cristal
2	DF	Eloy Campos	31 May 1942 (aged 28)	11	(Peru) Sporting Cristal
3	DF	Orlando de la Torre	21 November 1943 (aged 26)	2	(Peru) Sporting Cristal
4	DF	Héctor Chumpitaz (captain)	12 April 1944 (aged 26)	4	(Peru) Universitario
5	DF	Nicolás Fuentes	20 December 1941 (aged 28)	0	(Peru) Universitario
6	MF	Ramón Mifflin	5 April 1947 (aged 23)	6	(Peru) Sporting Cristal
7	MF	Roberto Challe	24 November 1946 (aged 23)	3	(Peru) Universitario
8	MF	Julio Baylón	10 December 1947 (aged 22)	4	(Peru) Alianza Lima
9	FW	Pedro Pablo León	26 March 1943 (aged 27)	10	(Peru) Alianza Lima
10	FW	Teófilo Cubillas	8 March 1949 (aged 21)	3	(Peru) Alianza Lima
11	MF	Alberto Gallardo	28 November 1940 (aged 29)	13	(Peru) Sporting Cristal
12	GK	Rubén Correa	25 July 1941 (aged 28)	?	(Peru) Universitario
13	MF	Pedro González	19 May 1943 (aged 27)	1	(Peru) Universitario
14	DF	José Fernández	14 February 1939 (aged 31)	3	(Peru) Sporting Cristal
15	MF	Javier González	11 May 1939 (aged 31)	2	(Peru) Alianza Lima
16	DF	Félix Salinas	11 May 1939 (aged 31)	?	(Peru) Universitario
17	MF	Luis Cruzado	6 July 1941 (aged 28)	0	(Peru) Universitario
18	FW	José del Castillo	1 January 1943 (aged 27)	?	(Peru) Sporting Cristal
19	FW	Eladio Reyes	8 January 1948 (aged 22)	0	(Peru) Juan Aurich
20	FW	Hugo Sotil	18 May 1949 (aged 21)	0	(Peru) Deportivo Municipal
21	GK	Jesus Goyzueta	1 January 1947 (aged 23)	?	(Peru) Universitario
22	FW	Oswaldo Ramírez	29 March 1947 (aged 23)	2	(Peru) Sport Boys

=== Bulgaria ===
Head coach: Stefan Bozhkov

No.	Pos.	Player	Date of birth (age)	Caps	Club
1	GK	Simeon Simeonov	26 April 1946 (aged 24)	30	(Bulgaria) Slavia Sofia
2	DF	Aleksandar Shalamanov	4 September 1941 (aged 28)	33	(Bulgaria) Slavia Sofia
3	DF	Ivan Dimitrov (captain)	14 May 1935 (aged 35)	70	(Bulgaria) Akademik Sofia
4	DF	Stefan Aladzhov	18 October 1947 (aged 22)	9	(Bulgaria) Levski-Spartak Sofia
5	MF	Ivan Davidov	5 October 1943 (aged 26)	10	(Bulgaria) Slavia Sofia
6	DF	Dimitar Penev	12 July 1945 (aged 24)	48	(Bulgaria) CSKA SZ Sofia
7	FW	Georgi Popov	14 July 1944 (aged 25)	20	(Bulgaria) Trakia Plovdiv
8	FW	Hristo Bonev	3 February 1947 (aged 23)	25	(Bulgaria) Lokomotiv Plovdiv
9	FW	Petar Zhekov	10 October 1944 (aged 25)	31	(Bulgaria) CSKA SZ Sofia
10	FW	Dimitar Yakimov	12 July 1941 (aged 28)	59	(Bulgaria) CSKA SZ Sofia
11	MF	Dinko Dermendzhiev	2 June 1941 (aged 28)	36	(Bulgaria) Trakia Plovdiv
12	DF	Milko Gaydarski	18 March 1946 (aged 24)	19	(Bulgaria) Levski-Spartak Sofia
13	GK	Stoyan Yordanov	29 January 1944 (aged 26)	8	(Bulgaria) CSKA SZ Sofia
14	DF	Dobromir Zhechev	12 November 1942 (aged 27)	42	(Bulgaria) Levski-Spartak Sofia
15	DF	Boris Gaganelov	7 October 1941 (aged 28)	50	(Bulgaria) CSKA SZ Sofia
16	MF	Asparuh Nikodimov	21 August 1945 (aged 24)	17	(Bulgaria) CSKA SZ Sofia
17	DF	Todor Kolev	29 April 1942 (aged 28)	9	(Bulgaria) Slavia Sofia
18	FW	Dimitar Marashliev	31 August 1947 (aged 22)	6	(Bulgaria) CSKA SZ Sofia
19	MF	Georgi Asparuhov	4 May 1943 (aged 27)	46	(Bulgaria) Levski-Spartak Sofia
20	MF	Vasil Mitkov	17 September 1943 (aged 26)	8	(Bulgaria) Levski-Spartak Sofia
21	FW	Bozhidar Grigorov	27 July 1945 (aged 24)	0	(Bulgaria) Slavia Sofia
22	GK	Georgi Kamenski	3 February 1947 (aged 23)	0	(Bulgaria) Levski-Spartak Sofia

Georgi Kamenski was a last-minute replacement for the injured Yordan Filipov.

=== Morocco ===
Head coach: (Socialist Federal Republic of Yugoslavia) Blagoje Vidinić

No.	Pos.	Player	Date of birth (age)	Caps	Club
1	GK	Allal Benkassou	11 November 1941 (aged 28)	2	(Morocco) FAR Rabat
2	DF	Abdallah Lamrani	1 January 1946 (aged 24)	0	(Morocco) FAR Rabat
3	DF	Boujemaa Benkhrif	30 November 1947 (aged 22)	0	(Morocco) KAC Kenitra
4	DF	Moulay Khanousi (captain)	21 June 1939 (aged 30)	0	(Morocco) MAS Fes
5	DF	Kacem Slimani	1 July 1948 (aged 21)	0	(Morocco) RS Settat
6	MF	Mohammed Mahroufi	1 January 1947 (aged 23)	0	(Morocco) DH Jadida
7	MF	Said Ghandi	16 August 1948 (aged 21)	0	(Morocco) RCA Casablanca
8	MF	Driss Bamous	15 December 1942 (aged 27)	2	(Morocco) FAR Rabat
9	FW	Ahmed Faras	7 December 1946 (aged 23)	0	(Morocco) Chabab Mohammedia
10	FW	Mohammed El Filali	9 July 1945 (aged 24)	0	(Morocco) Mouloudia Oujda
11	MF	Maouhoub Ghazouani	1 January 1946 (aged 24)	0	(Morocco) FAR Rabat
12	GK	Mohammed Hazzaz	30 November 1945 (aged 24)	0	(Morocco) MAS Fes
13	DF	Jalili Fadili	1 February 1941 (aged 29)	0	(Morocco) FAR Rabat
14	FW	Houmane Jarir	30 November 1944 (aged 25)	0	(Morocco) RCA Casablanca
15	MF	Hadi Dahane	1 January 1946 (aged 24)	?	(Morocco) Union Sidi Kacem
16	MF	Mustapha Choukri	1 January 1945 (aged 25)	0	(Morocco) RCA Casablanca
17	FW	Ahmed Alaoui	1 January 1949 (aged 21)	0	(Morocco) RS Settat
18	DF	Abdelkader El Khiati	1 January 1945 (aged 25)	0	(Morocco) FAR Rabat
19	GK	Abdelkader Ouaraghli	1 January 1943 (aged 27)	?	(Morocco) WAC Casablanca

Note: Only 19 players in Morocco squad.

== Coaches representation by country ==
Nº	Country	Coaches
2	Brazil	Didi (Peru), Mário Zagallo
1	Belgium	Raymond Goethals
1	Bulgaria	Stefan Bozhkov
1	Chile	Hernán Carrasco (El Salvador)
1	Czechoslovakia	Jozef Marko
1	England	Alf Ramsey
1	Israel	Emmanuel Scheffer
1	Italy	Ferruccio Valcareggi
1	Mexico	Raúl Cárdenas
1	Romania	Angelo Niculescu
1	Soviet Union	Gavril Kachalin
1	Sweden	Orvar Bergmark
1	Uruguay	Juan Hohberg
1	West Germany	Helmut Schön
1	(Socialist Federal Republic of Yugoslavia) Yugoslavia	Blagoje Vidinić (Morocco)
