= Héctor Santos =

Héctor Santos may refer to:

- Héctor Santos (footballer) (1944–2019), Uruguayan footballer
- Héctor Santos (athlete) (born 1998), Spanish long jumper
