= Jacques Duquesne =

Jacques Duquesne may refer to:

- Jacques Duquesne (footballer) (1940–2023), Belgian footballer
- Jacques DuQuesne, the Swordsman of Marvel Comics
