= Francisco Montes =

Francisco Montes may be:

- Francisco Montes Reina
- Francisco Montes de Oca y Saucedo
- Francisco Montes (footballer)
