= Czech Republic national football team =

Men's national association football team representing the Czech Republic

Czech Republic
- Nickname: Repre (The Representatives)
- Association: Football Association of the Czech Republic (FAČR)
- Confederation: UEFA (Europe)
- Head coach: Santi Denia
- Captain: Ladislav Krejčí
- Most caps: Petr Čech (124)
- Top scorer: Jan Koller (55)
- Home stadium: Various
- FIFA code: CZE
First colours	Second colours

FIFA ranking
- Current: 51 ▼3 (7 October 2026)
- Highest: 2 (September 1999; January – May 2000; April – May 2005; January – May 2006)
- Lowest: 67 (March 1994)

First international
- Hungary 2–1 Bohemia (Budapest, Hungary; 5 April 1903) as Czech Republic; Turkey 1–4 Czech Republic (Istanbul, Turkey; 23 February 1994)

Biggest win
- Czechoslovakia 7–0 Kingdom of SCS (Antwerp, Belgium; 28 August 1920) as Czech Republic; Czech Republic 8–1 Andorra (Liberec, Czech Republic; 4 June 2005); Czech Republic 7–0 San Marino (Liberec, Czech Republic; 7 October 2006); Czech Republic 7–0 San Marino (Uherské Hradiště, Czech Republic; 9 September 2009); Czech Republic 7–0 Kuwait (Olomouc, Czech Republic; 11 November 2021)

Biggest defeat
- Hungary 8–3 Czechoslovakia (Budapest, Hungary; 19 September 1937) as Czech Republic; England 5–0 Czech Republic (London, England; 22 March 2019)

World Cup
- Appearances: 10 (first in 1934 as Czechoslovakia; 2006 as Czech Republic)
- Best result: As Czechoslovakia: Runners-up (1934, 1962); As Czech Republic: Group stage (2006, 2026)

European Championship
- Appearances: 11 (first in 1960 as Czechoslovakia; 1996 as Czech Republic)
- Best result: As Czechoslovakia: Champions (1976); As Czech Republic: Runners-up (1996)

Confederations Cup
- Appearances: 1 (first in 1997)
- Best result: Third place (1997)
Medal record
FIFA World Cup
Silver medal – second place	1934 Italy	Team
Silver medal – second place	1962 Chile	Team
UEFA European Championship
Gold medal – first place	1976 Yugoslavia	Team
Silver medal – second place	1996 England	Team
Bronze medal – third place	1960 France	Team
Bronze medal – third place	1980 Italy	Team
Olympic Games
Gold medal – first place	1980 Moscow	Team
Silver medal – second place	1964 Tokyo	Team
FIFA Confederations Cup
Bronze medal – third place	1997 Saudi Arabia	Team

The Czech Republic national football team (Czech: Česká fotbalová reprezentace), recognised by FIFA as Czechia, represents the Czech Republic in men's international football. The team is controlled by the Football Association of the Czech Republic (FAČR). Historically, the team participated in FIFA and UEFA competitions as Bohemia and Czechoslovakia.

Following the dissolution of Czechoslovakia, the first international competition of the Czech Republic was UEFA Euro 1996, where they finished runners-up. They have taken part at every European Championship since. Following the separation, they have featured at two FIFA World Cups, in 2006 and 2026.

== History ==
=== 1901–1911 (Bohemia) ===
While part of Austria-Hungary, the national team of Bohemia (established on 19 October 1901) played its first international on 5 April 1903, a 2–1 loss for Hungary in Budapest. On 7 October, Hungary came to Prague for a 4–4 draw. The two countries played three more matches up to 1908, including Bohemia's only victory on 6 October 1907. Bohemia played its last match on 13 June 1908, losing 4–0 at home to England.

After being expelled from FIFA due to objections from the Austrian Football Association, the ČSF founded the UIAFA along with French USFSA and English Amateur Football Association in March 1909. Bohemia won the UIAFA Great European football tournament in 1911, defeating the AFA England team 2–1 in the final.

=== 1939 ===
With the dissolution of Czechoslovakia and the creation of the Protectorate of Bohemia and Moravia in March 1939 by Nazi Germany, the old Czechoslovak national team temporarily ceased to exist. Unlike the Slovak Republic (which proclaimed independence and operated an active, regular national team for several years), the Protectorate could not develop autonomous and prolonged international activity.
However, during the course of 1939, the selection of Bohemia and Moravia (Reprezentace Čech a Moravy) was temporarily reactivated and took to the field to play three matches:

- August 27, 1939 (Prague): Bohemia and Moravia - Yugoslavia 7-3 (unofficial friendly)
- October 22, 1939 (Prague): Bohemia and Moravia - Austria (Ostmark) 5-5 (unofficial friendly)
- November 12, 1939 (Breslau): Germany - Bohemia and Moravia 4-4 (official friendly)

These matches saw the participation of great stars of the era who had driven Czechoslovakia to become runners-up at the 1934 World Cup, such as Josef Bican, Oldřich Nejedlý, and Antonín Puč.
After November 1939, however, the pressure and control of the Nazi regime abruptly brought the experiment to an end: the national team was disbanded, and Czech players continued to play only at the club level in local championships (the Národní liga), no longer able to wear an international representative jersey until the end of World War II and the re-establishment of Czechoslovakia.

=== 1990s ===
When Czechoslovakia split into the Czech Republic and Slovakia, the Czech Republic team was formed. They played their first friendly match away to Turkey on 23 February 1994. The newly formed team played their first home game in Ostrava, against Lithuania, in which they registered their first home win.

Their first competitive match was part of the UEFA Euro 1996 qualifying campaign, in which they defeated Malta 6–1 in Ostrava. During the campaign, the Czech Republic registered six wins, three draws, and a defeat against Luxembourg, finishing their qualifying Group 5 in first place, ahead of group favourites the Netherlands. In the final tournament, hosted by England, the Czechs progressed from the group stage, despite a 2–0 opening game defeat to Germany. They progressed to the UEFA Euro 1996 Final, losing 2–1 to Germany at Wembley Stadium.

The Czechs finished third in the 1998 FIFA World Cup qualifying group, behind Spain and Yugoslavia, and subsequently missed the tournament.

=== 2000s ===
The Czech Republic qualified for Euro 2000, winning all of their group games and conceding five goals. In the finals the team were drawn in Group D, alongside France, the Netherlands and Denmark. The team lost to the Netherlands after a last-minute penalty and were defeated in second match by France, which eliminated them from advancing to the knockout round. The Czech Republic managed a 2–0 win against Denmark in their final game courtesy of two goals from Vladimír Šmicer.

Once again, the Czech Republic failed to qualify for the World Cup, this time finishing second in their 2002 qualification group, behind Denmark, and then being beaten 1–0 in both legs by Belgium in the UEFA play-offs for a place in the finals.

A team settled with Pavel Nedvěd, Jan Koller, Tomáš Rosický, Milan Baroš, Marek Jankulovski, Tomáš Galásek together with the emergence of goalkeeper Petr Čech were unbeaten in 2002 and 2003, scoring 53 goals in 19 games and qualifying for Euro 2004 in the process. The Czech Republic went on a 20-game unbeaten streak, which finally ended in Dublin on 31 March 2004 in a friendly match against the Republic of Ireland. The Czechs entered the Euro finals in Group D, alongside the Netherlands, Germany and Latvia. The team trailed 2–0 to the Netherlands before winning the game 3–2 and beat Germany in the final group match. The Czech Republic beat Denmark in the quarter-final, went into the semi-final against Greece and Tomáš Rosický hit the bar after just two minutes, Jan Koller had shots saved by the Greek goalkeeper and Pavel Nedvěd left the pitch injured in the end of the first half. The first 90 minutes finished goalless and Greece won the game in the last minute of the first half of extra-time with a silver goal.

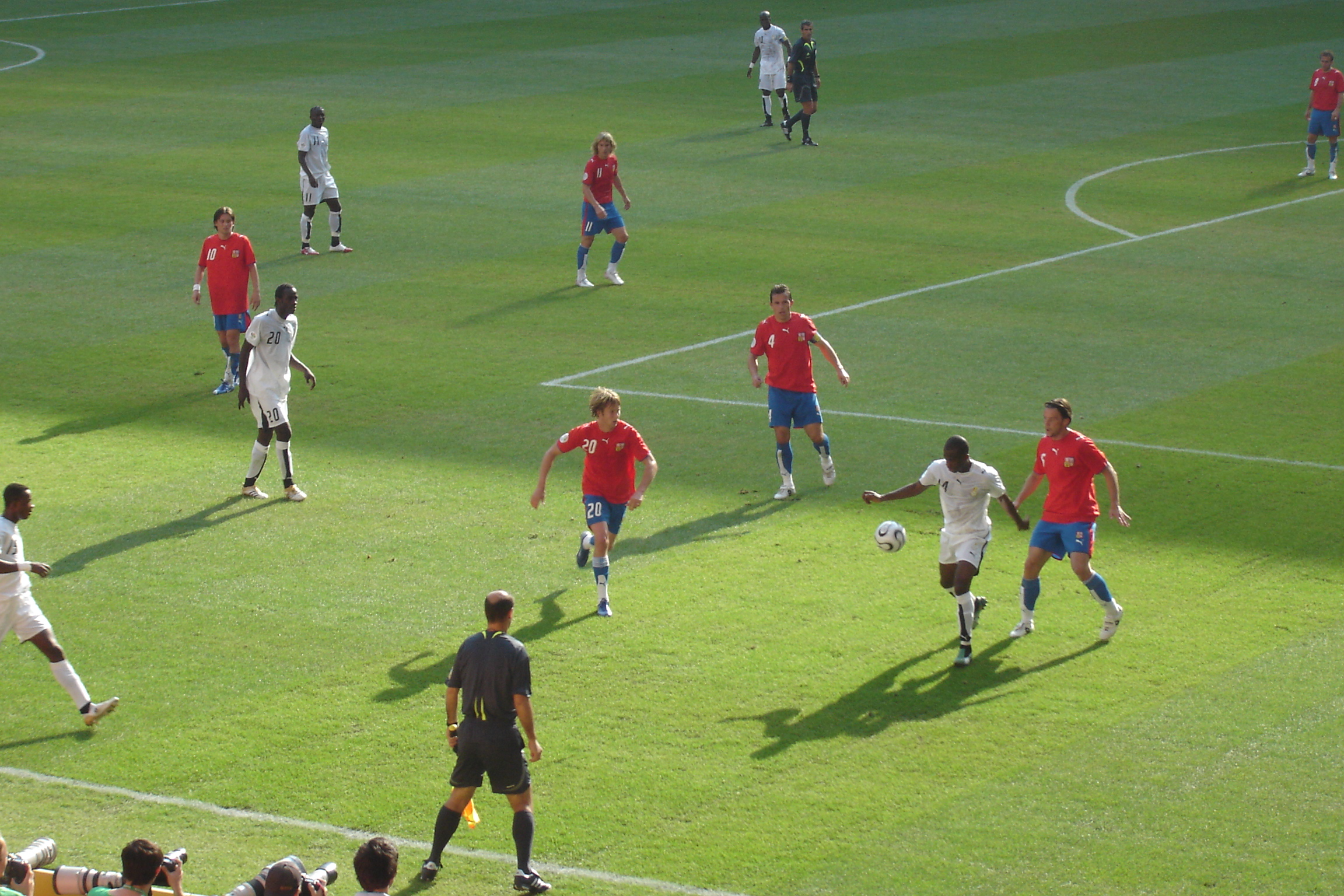
Czech Republic (red) vs Ghana (white) at the 2006 World Cup

The Czech Republic achieved their record win during the 2006 World Cup qualifying, thrashing Andorra 8–1 in a qualification match in Liberec. In the same match, Jan Koller became the all-time top scorer for the national team with his 35th international goal. At the end of the campaign, after finishing in second place in Group 1 and defeating Norway in a playoff, the Czechs qualified for their first World Cup. The team was boosted prior to the play-off matches by the return of Pavel Nedvěd, who had initially retired from international football after Euro 2004. The squad for the 2006 World Cup in Germany included 18 players from the Euro 2004 team. With the team ranked second in the world, they started the tournament with a 3–0 win over the United States. During the game, however, Jan Koller was forced to leave with a hamstring injury, exiting the tournament. In the next game, with Milan Baroš still recovering from injury, the team suffered a 2–0 loss to Ghana. Baroš returned for the final game against Italy, a must-win for a round of 16 appearance. The team were reduced to ten men as Jan Polák was dismissed before half-time for two bookable offences. Italy went on to win 2–0. Pavel Nedvěd, Karel Poborský and Vratislav Lokvenc retired from the national team after the tournament.

In the qualifying campaign for Euro 2008, they finished top of their group, above Germany on head-to-head record. The Czech Republic beat co-hosts Switzerland 1–0 in their opening game of the finals, before being beaten 3–1 by Portugal. This meant the Czechs and Turkey carried identical records going into the final group game. Although the Czechs took a 2–0 lead just past the hour mark and looked set to qualify, Turkey scored three goals in the final 15 minutes of the game to win the game 3–2.

The Czechs entered 2010 World Cup qualification, being drawn in Group 3, under the guidance of coach Petr Rada. They started with a 0–0 away draw against Northern Ireland, before losing to Poland. A late goal from Libor Sionko won the next game 1–0 against Slovenia. This was followed by a win against San Marino, and a goalless draw in Slovenia. In their following match, against neighbours Slovakia, a 2–1 defeat at home left Czech Republic in a precarious qualifying position. Manager Petr Rada was dismissed and six players were suspended. Ivan Hašek took temporary charge as manager, gaining four points from his first two matches, as the team drew away to group leaders Slovakia and thrashed San Marino 7–0 in Uherské Hradiště. They subsequently beat Poland in Prague but followed this result with a goalless draw against Northern Ireland, finishing third in the group and failing to qualify for the World Cup. Hašek announced his immediate resignation.

=== 2010s ===
A changed team under Michal Bílek entered the Euro 2012 qualifiers and began with a home loss to Lithuania. But a win at home to Scotland was followed by wins against Liechtenstein. Spain defeated Czech Republic in between the Liechtenstein games, but the play-off spot was still in their hands. In the next game, a last minute penalty from Michal Kadlec away to Scotland secured a 2–2 draw. Despite Scotland winning their next two games and the Czechs again being defeated by Spain, the team could finish second if they could beat Lithuania away from home in the final game, assuming Spain would beat Scotland at home. Spain won 3–1 and Czech Republic defeated Lithuania 4–1 to seal second spot and a place in the play-offs. Czech Republic were drawn to face Montenegro in the two-legged play-off. A goal from Václav Pilař and a last minute second from Tomáš Sivok helped the Czechs to a 2–0 first leg lead. In the second leg in Podgorica, a late goal from Petr Jiráček sealed a 1–0 win and the Czechs ran out 3–0 aggregate winners and qualified for Euro 2012.

At the tournament, the Czechs lost their opening game 4–1 to Russia, with their only goal coming from Václav Pilař. In their second match, against Greece, the Czech Republic went 2–0 up within the first six minutes thanks to goals from Petr Jiráček and a second from Pilař. Following the half-time substitution of captain Tomáš Rosický, Greece scored a second-half goal following a mistake from Czech goalkeeper Petr Čech, although there were no more goals and the Czech Republic recorded their first win of the tournament. Going into their third and final group match, the Czech Republic needed at least a draw against co-hosts Poland to advance to the knockout stage. A second-half strike by Jiráček proved the difference between the teams as the Czechs ran out as 1–0 winners. Due to Greece beating Russia in the other group game, the Czech Republic subsequently finished top of Group A, becoming the first team ever to win a group at the European Championships with a negative goal difference.

Bílek stayed on as coach, despite unrest amongst fans, and was tasked with qualifying for the 2014 World Cup. The Czechs were drawn into UEFA qualifying Group B along with Italy, Denmark, Bulgaria, Armenia and Malta. The campaign started with goalless draws against Denmark and Bulgaria, paired with a narrow win against Malta. The team then lost 0–3 to Denmark at home. The Czechs were then able to beat Armenia and draw with group leaders Italy, but lost to both Armenia and Italy in the rematches. Bílek resigned after the loss and was replaced with assistant coach Josef Pešice.

Pavel Vrba was appointed as the team's new coach in 2014, ahead of Euro 2016 qualifying. The Czech team was drawn into Group A, along with Netherlands, Turkey, Iceland, Latvia and Kazakhstan. The Czech team began with a win, defeating Netherlands, and followed up with victories over Turkey, Kazakhstan and Iceland, leaving them as group leaders with maximum points after four matches. A draw at home against Latvia followed; nonetheless, Czech Republic remained group leaders, and on 6 September 2015, qualified for their sixth European Championship. They only got one point from a draw with Croatia, losing to Spain and Turkey. During a friendly match against Australia on 1 June 2018, the Czechs recorded their biggest defeat losing 0–4 in Sankt Pölten, Austria. That would eventually be eclipsed during their first qualifier for Euro 2020, as they were beaten 0–5 at Wembley Stadium by England.

On the other hand, they qualified directly for Euro 2020, finishing 2nd in Group A during the qualifiers, with a record of five wins and three defeats in eight games. The team won at home against England, the group leader (2–1) and lost all three away matches, against England (0–5), Kosovo (1–2) and Bulgaria (0–1).

=== 2020s ===
On 18 November 2020, the Czech Republic, then placed in Group 2 of League B in the 2020–2021 edition of the Nations League, obtained promotion to League A for the next edition thanks to a win at home against Slovakia on the last day of the group stages (2–0), allowing the national team to overtake Scotland, which was defeated by Israel (0–1) at the same time. The Czechs were drawn into Group D with qualification opponents England, along with Croatia and Scotland.

2021 started on a positive note for the Czech Republic, who managed to draw with Belgium at home 1–1 in the qualifiers for the 2022 World Cup. Above all, the Euros, postponed to the summer of 2021 due to COVID-19, saw the Czech men advance from the group. The Czech Republic won the first game against Scotland, who were one of 12 host countries for the Euros, with a double from Patrik Schick (2–0), including a long-range goal. The Czechs then drew 1–1 against Croatia before losing to England at Wembley 1–0. The Czechs finished among the four best third-place teams. In the round of 16 the Czech Republic faced the Netherlands, surprising them with a 2–0 win with goals from Tomáš Holeš and Patrik Schick while the Dutch team finished the game with 10 players. Appearing in the quarter-finals for the first time since 2012, they were beaten by Denmark 2–1, having conceded the first Danish goal after 5 minutes of play due to a refereeing error caused by a non-existent corner.

The Czech Republic failed to qualify for the World Cup in Qatar, finishing third in their group, behind Belgium and Wales, whom they failed to beat (home draw and away defeat in both cases), but they made it to the play-offs thanks to their position in the 2020–21 UEFA Nations League. They were eliminated in the semi-finals of the B path, following an away defeat against Sweden in extra time (1–0). They were then relegated to League B after finishing bottom of their group in the 2022–2023 Nations League.

The Czech Republic, without injured star striker Schick for the entire Euro 2024 qualifying campaign, had a difficult and chaotic campaign, but qualified for the Euros in Germany by finishing second in their qualifying group thanks to a 3–0 home win over Moldova on the final day. After qualifying, coach Jaroslav Šilhavý resigned in the face of criticism from fans and controversy surrounding some of the team's players.

On 4 January 2024, Ivan Hašek returned to the Czech football team as the head coach until November 2025, with an option to continue if the team qualifies for the 2026 World Cup. He oversaw 2–1 victories against Norway and Armenia. At Euro 2024, the Czech Republic failed to qualify for the round of 16, losing 2–1 to Portugal, which was followed by a 1–1 draw to Georgia with many opportunities missed, and a 2–1 loss to Turkey in the final match of the group after being quickly reduced to 10 players following a second yellow card for Antonín Barák, the third time that Czech Republic lost a decisive game against Turkey after Euro 2008 and Euro 2016. They finished fourth in Group F.

On 19 December 2025, Miroslav Koubek was hired as manager of national team. On 23 March 2026, Ladislav Krejčí was confirmed as the new captain of the Czech Republic, after Tomáš Souček's earlier dismissal. Later that month, the Czech Republic won both ties in the 2026 World Cup qualification second round against the Republic of Ireland and Denmark on penalty shootouts, qualifying for the 2026 FIFA World Cup after their last appearance in 2006. At the 2026 World Cup, losses against South Korea and Mexico, along with a draw against South Africa, led to the Czech Republic's early elimination at bottom of Group A with one point. Koubek later stepped down from his position as Czech coach.

On 31 July 2026, FAČR appointed Santi Denia of Spain as head coach of the national team, signing a two-year contract and in the process being the first foreigner in history to take charge of the national team.

== Team image ==
Since 1993, the Czech Republic home kit has primarily been red shirts, with either blue or red shorts. While their away kit has been white shirts with white shorts. Although the team wore blue shorts for a short period between 2010 and 2011. In November 2019, the team introduced a new alternate colour (yellow-green) as the away kit for the first time.

On 1 September 2026, the FAČR announced Adidas as the new official kit supplier, ending a 30-year partnership with Puma.

Year	Kit supplier
1993−1996	(Germany) Adidas
1996−2026	(Germany) Puma
2026−	(Germany) Adidas

== Stadiums ==
16 different cities have hosted Czech Republic football matches between 1994 and 2025. The most commonly used stadium was Stadion Letná, the home stadium of Sparta Prague, which was renovated in 1994. Another frequently used stadium was Na Stínadlech in Teplice. However, since the 2018 World Cup qualification, major matches are usually played at the newer Stadion Eden, the home stadium of Slavia Prague, which was built in 2008. Since 2012, competitive games have also been held Doosan Arena, Plzeň. Some matches are also played in Moravia at Andrův stadion in Olomouc and Městský stadion in Ostrava.

Stadiums which have hosted Czech Republic international football matches:

Number of matches	Stadium	W	D	L	First international	Latest international
50	Stadion Letná, Prague	31	7	12	26 April 1995	31 May 2026
22	Stadion Eden, Prague	9	8	5	27 May 2008	26 March 2026
20	Na Stínadlech, Teplice	18	1	1	18 September 1996	11 September 2012
16	Andrův stadion, Olomouc	12	0	4	25 March 1998	17 November 2025
10	Štruncovy sady Stadion, Plzeň	9	1	0	12 October 2012	6 June 2025
5	Bazaly, Ostrava	4	0	1	25 May 1994	16 August 2000
4	Stadion u Nisy, Liberec	4	0	0	4 June 2005	11 August 2010
4	Městský stadion, Ostrava	3	1	0	26 March 1996	2 September 2021
3	Stadion Střelnice, Jablonec	3	0	0	4 September 1996	5 June 2009
3	Městský stadion, Uherské Hradiště	1	0	2	16 August 2006	6 September 2018
3	Malšovická aréna, Hradec Králové	2	1	0	10 June 2024	8 September 2025
2	Stadion Evžena Rošického, Prague	1	1	0	24 April 1996	18 August 2004
2	Sportovní areál, Drnovice	2	0	0	18 August 1999	15 August 2001
2	Městský stadion, Mladá Boleslav	1	1	0	31 August 2016	15 November 2016
1	Stadion FC Bohemia Poděbrady, Poděbrady	1	0	0	26 February 1997	
1	Stadion Za Lužánkami, Brno	1	0	0	8 March 1995	
1	Stadion Střelecký ostrov, České Budějovice	1	0	0	29 March 2011	
1	Městský stadion, Ústí nad Labem	1	0	0	22 March 2017	
1	Městský stadion, Karviná	1	0	0	13 November 2025	

== Results and fixtures ==
The following is a list of match results in the last 12 months, as well as any future matches that have been scheduled.

Win Draw Loss Fixture

=== 2026 ===
26 March 2026 2026 World Cup qualification play-offs	Czech Republic	2–2 (a.e.t.) (4–3 p)	Republic of Ireland	Prague, Czech Republic
20:45 UTC+1	Schick 27' (pen.); Krejčí 86'	Report	Parrott 19' (pen.); Kovář 23' (o.g.)	Stadium: Fortuna Arena; Attendance: 19,137; Referee: Glenn Nyberg (Sweden)
	Penalties
	Krejčí (penalty scored); Souček (penalty scored); Chytil (penalty missed); Schick (penalty scored); Kliment (penalty scored)		(penalty scored) Parrott; (penalty scored) Idah; (penalty scored) Brady; (penalty missed) Azaz; (penalty missed) Browne

31 March 2026 2026 World Cup qualification play-offs	Czech Republic	2–2 (a.e.t.) (3–1 p)	Denmark	Prague, Czech Republic
20:45 UTC+2	Šulc 3'; Krejčí 100'	Report	Andersen 72'; Høgh 111'	Stadium: Stadion Letná; Attendance: 18,215; Referee: Maurizio Mariani (Italy)
	Penalties
	Chorý (penalty scored); Souček (penalty scored); Krejčí (penalty missed); Sadílek (penalty scored)		(penalty missed) Højlund; (penalty scored) Eriksen; (penalty missed) Dreyer; (penalty missed) Jensen

31 May 2026 Friendly	Czech Republic	2–1	Kosovo	Prague, Czech Republic
16:00 UTC+2	Ladra 12'; Hložek 32'	Report	Emërllahu 81'	Stadium: Stadion Letná; Attendance: 11,102; Referee: Michal Očenáš (Slovakia)

4 June 2026 Friendly	Czech Republic	3–1	Guatemala	Harrison, United States
20:00 UTC−4	Schick 11'; Chorý 72'; Višinský 79'	Report	Fajardo 40'	Stadium: Sports Illustrated Stadium; Attendance: 9,810; Referee: Pierre-Luc Lauzière (Canada)

11 June 2026 2026 FIFA World Cup GS	South Korea	2–1	Czech Republic	Zapopan, Mexico
20:00 UTC−6	Hwang In-beom 67'; Oh Hyeon-gyu 80'	Report	Krejčí 59'	Stadium: Estadio Akron; Attendance: 44,985; Referee: Amin Mohamed Omar (Egypt)

18 June 2026 2026 FIFA World Cup GS	Czech Republic	1–1	South Africa	Atlanta, United States
12:00 UTC−4	Sadílek 6'	Report	Mokoena 83' (pen.)	Stadium: Mercedes-Benz Stadium; Attendance: 67,442; Referee: Tori Penso (United States)

24 June 2026 2026 FIFA World Cup GS	Czech Republic	0–3	Mexico	Mexico City, Mexico
19:00 UTC−6		Report	Chávez 55'; Quiñones 61'; Fidalgo 90+4'	Stadium: Estadio Azteca; Attendance: 80,824; Referee: Yael Falcón (Argentina)

26 September 2026 2026–27 Nations League	Czech Republic	1–2	Croatia	Prague, Czech Republic
20:45 UTC+2	Karabec 54'	Report	Modrić 47'; Pašalić 77'	Stadium: Fortuna Arena; Attendance: 15,421; Referee: Simone Sozza (Italy)

29 September 2026 2026–27 Nations League	Czech Republic	0–2	England	Prague, Czech Republic
20:45 UTC+2		Report	Gordon 47'; Kane 69'	Stadium: Fortuna Arena; Attendance: 18,930; Referee: Halil Umut Meler (Turkey)

3 October 2026 2026–27 Nations League	Spain	3–1	Czech Republic	Oviedo, Spain
20:45 UTC+2	Yamal 6'; Rodri 35'; Merino 89'	Report	Sláma 69'	Stadium: Estadio Carlos Tartiere; Attendance: 28,515; Referee: Vassilis Fotias (Greece)

6 October 2026 2026–27 Nations League	England	3–0	Czech Republic	London, England
19:45 UTC+1	Coufal 27' (o.g.); Kane 40', 57'	Report		Stadium: Wembley Stadium; Attendance: 78,864; Referee: Serdar Gözübüyük (Netherlands)

12 November 2026 2026–27 Nations League	Czech Republic	0–2	Spain	Prague, Czech Republic
20:45 UTC+1		Report	Baena 39' (pen.); Pubill 90+6'	Stadium: Fortuna Arena; Attendance: 18,193; Referee: Nikola Dabanović (Montenegro)

15 November 2026 2026–27 Nations League	Croatia	2–1	Czech Republic	Osijek, Croatia
20:45 UTC+1	Perišić 2'; Majer 87'	Report	Hložek 84'	Stadium: Opus Arena; Attendance: 12,009; Referee: Luís Godinho (Portugal)

== Coaching staff ==
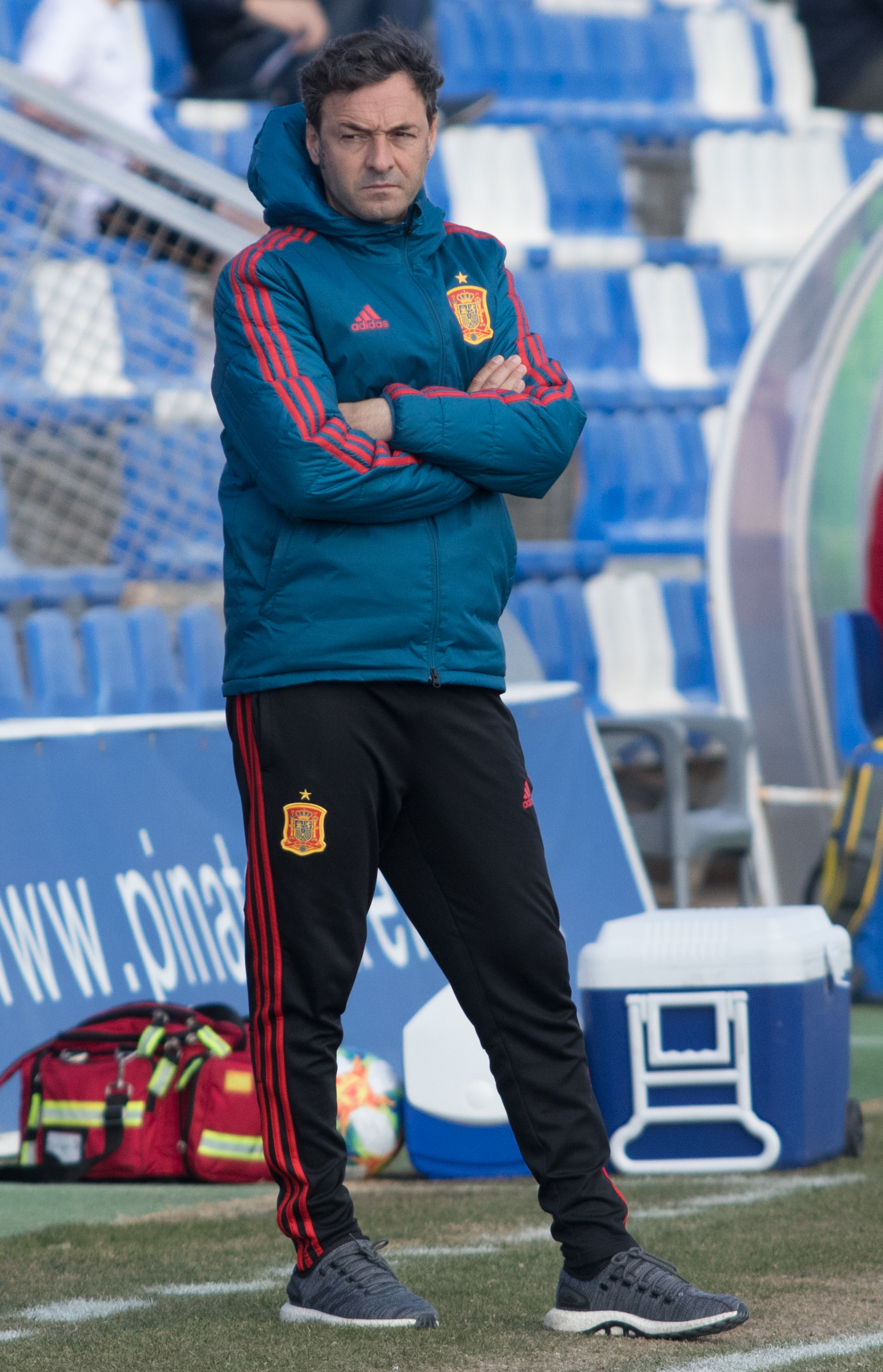
Current head coach Santi Denia

As of 8 September 2026

Position	Name
Head coach	(Spain) Santi Denia
Assistant coach	(Spain) Pablo Amo (Czech Republic) Radek Bejbl
Goalkeeping coach	(Spain) Rubén Martínez

=== Coaching history ===
- (Czech Republic) Dušan Uhrin (1994–1997)
- (Czech Republic) Jozef Chovanec (1998–2001)
- (Czech Republic) Karel Brückner (2001–2008)
- (Czech Republic) Petr Rada (2008–2009)
- (Czech Republic) František Straka (2009)
- (Czech Republic) Ivan Hašek (interim) (2009)
- (Czech Republic) Michal Bílek (2009–2013)
- (Czech Republic) Josef Pešice (interim) (2013)
- (Czech Republic) Pavel Vrba (2014–2016)
- (Czech Republic) Karel Jarolím (2016–2018)
- (Czech Republic) Jaroslav Šilhavý (2018–2023)
- (Czech Republic) Ivan Hašek (2024–2025)
- (Czech Republic) Jaroslav Köstl (interim) (2025)
- (Czech Republic) Miroslav Koubek (2025–2026)
- (Spain) Santi Denia (2026–)

== Players ==
=== Current squad ===
The following players were called up for the 2026–27 UEFA Nations League A matches against Spain and Croatia on 12 and 15 November 2026, respectively.

Caps and goals updated as of 15 November 2026, after the match against Croatia.

No.	Pos.	Player	Date of birth (age)	Caps	Goals	Club
1	GK	Matěj Kovář	17 May 2000 (age 26)	25	0	(Royal Dutch Football Association) PSV Eindhoven
16	GK	Lukáš Horníček	13 July 2002 (age 24)	3	0	(The Football Association) Newcastle United
23	GK	Antonín Kinský	13 March 2003 (age 23)	2	0	(The Football Association) Tottenham Hotspur
5	DF	Vladimír Coufal	22 August 1992 (age 34)	69	2	(German Football Association) TSG Hoffenheim
7	DF	Ladislav Krejčí	20 April 1999 (age 27)	33	6	(The Football Association) Wolverhampton Wanderers
6	DF	David Zima	8 November 2000 (age 26)	28	1	(Football Association of the Czech Republic) Slavia Prague
14	DF	David Jurásek	7 August 2000 (age 26)	19	1	(Football Association of the Czech Republic) Slavia Prague
2	DF	Štěpán Chaloupek	8 March 2003 (age 23)	9	0	(Football Association of the Czech Republic) Slavia Prague
15	DF	Jiří Sláma	8 January 1999 (age 27)	5	1	(Football Association of the Czech Republic) Jablonec
	DF	Matěj Jurásek	30 August 2003 (age 23)	4	1	(Football Association of the Czech Republic) Sparta Prague
3	DF	Tomáš Vlček	28 February 2001 (age 25)	4	0	(Football Association of the Czech Republic) Slavia Prague
4	DF	Adam Gabriel	28 May 2001 (age 25)	1	0	(Football Association of the Czech Republic) Viktoria Plzeň
22	MF	Tomáš Souček	27 February 1995 (age 31)	94	17	(The Football Association) West Ham United
21	MF	Alex Král	19 May 1998 (age 28)	54	2	(Danish Football Association) Copenhagen
17	MF	Lukáš Provod	23 October 1996 (age 30)	42	3	(Football Association of the Czech Republic) Slavia Prague
	MF	Michal Sadílek	31 May 1999 (age 27)	43	2	(Football Association of the Czech Republic) Slavia Prague
12	MF	Lukáš Červ	10 April 2001 (age 25)	24	2	(Football Association of the Czech Republic) Viktoria Plzeň
13	MF	Lukáš Ambros	5 June 2004 (age 22)	6	0	(Royal Belgian Football Association) Anderlecht
18	MF	Martin Šubert	13 August 2002 (age 24)	2	0	(Football Association of the Czech Republic) Mladá Boleslav
20	MF	Kryštof Daněk	5 January 2003 (age 23)	3	0	(Austrian Football Association) LASK
19	MF	David Kozel	28 November 2001 (age 24)	1	0	(Football Association of the Czech Republic) Mladá Boleslav
	MF	Filip Prebsl	4 March 2004 (age 22)	1	0	(Football Association of the Czech Republic) Viktoria Plzeň
10	FW	Adam Hložek	25 July 2002 (age 24)	52	6	(German Football Association) TSG Hoffenheim
9	FW	Ryan Naderi	10 July 2003 (age 23)	4	0	(Scottish Football Association) Rangers
11	FW	Christophe Kabongo	27 August 2003 (age 23)	3	0	(Football Association of the Czech Republic) Viktoria Plzeň
8	FW	Idris Hopi	12 May 2008 (age 18)	2	0	(Football Association of the Czech Republic) Teplice

=== Recent call-ups ===
The following players have also been called up to the Czech Republic squad within the last twelve months:

Pos.	Player	Date of birth (age)	Caps	Goals	Club	Latest call-up
GK	Jindřich Staněk	27 April 1996 (age 30)	14	0	(Saudi Arabia) Al-Hazem	2026 FIFA World Cup
GK	Martin Jedlička	24 January 1998 (age 28)	1	0	(Czech Republic) Baník Ostrava	2026 FIFA World Cup ^{PRE}
GK	Jan Koutný	14 October 2004 (age 22)	0	0	(Czech Republic) Sigma Olomouc	2026 FIFA World Cup ^{PRE}
GK	Jakub Markovič	13 July 2001 (age 25)	0	0	(Czech Republic) Slavia Prague	2026 FIFA World Cup ^{PRE}
DF	Robin Hranáč	29 January 2000 (age 26)	20	1	(Germany) TSG Hoffenheim	v. England, 6 October 2026
DF	Martin Vitík	21 January 2003 (age 23)	11	0	(Italy) Bologna	v. England, 6 October 2026
DF	Ondřej Zmrzlý	22 April 1999 (age 27)	4	0	(Poland) Górnik Zabrze	v. England, 6 October 2026
DF	Michal Sáček	19 September 1996 (age 30)	2	0	(Poland) Górnik Zabrze	v. England, 6 October 2026
DF	Ondřej Kričfaluši	9 March 2004 (age 22)	1	0	(Belgium) Union Saint-Gilloise	v. England, 6 October 2026
DF	Matěj Ryneš	30 May 2001 (age 25)	2	0	(Czech Republic) Sparta Prague	v. Croatia, 26 September 2026 ^{INJ}
DF	Tomáš Holeš	31 March 1993 (age 33)	43	2	(Czech Republic) Slavia Prague	2026 FIFA World Cup
DF	Jaroslav Zelený	20 August 1992 (age 34)	25	0	(Czech Republic) Sparta Prague	2026 FIFA World Cup
DF	David Douděra	31 May 1998 (age 28)	18	2	(United States) FC Cincinnati	2026 FIFA World Cup
DF	Václav Jemelka	23 June 1995 (age 31)	12	0	(Czech Republic) Viktoria Plzeň	2026 FIFA World Cup ^{PRE}
DF	Matěj Hadaš	25 November 2003 (age 22)	0	0	(Czech Republic) Sigma Olomouc	2026 FIFA World Cup ^{PRE}
DF	Adam Ševínský	19 June 2004 (age 22)	0	0	(Czech Republic) Sparta Prague	2026 FIFA World Cup ^{PRE}
DF	Karel Spáčil	18 May 2003 (age 23)	0	0	(Czech Republic) Viktoria Plzeň	2026 FIFA World Cup ^{PRE}
MF	Ondřej Lingr	7 October 1998 (age 28)	28	1	(Poland) Korona Kielce	v. England, 6 October 2026
MF	Adam Karabec	2 July 2003 (age 23)	7	3	(Czech Republic) Sparta Prague	v. England, 6 October 2026
MF	Matěj Radosta	10 May 2001 (age 25)	4	0	(Czech Republic) Teplice	v. England, 6 October 2026
MF	Roman Macek	18 April 1997 (age 29)	3	0	(Czech Republic) Sparta Prague	v. England, 6 October 2026
MF	Pavel Bucha	11 March 1998 (age 28)	2	0	(United States) FC Cincinnati	v. England, 6 October 2026
MF	Denis Višinský	21 March 2003 (age 23)	3	1	(Czech Republic) Viktoria Plzeň	v. Croatia, 26 September 2026 ^{INJ}
MF	Vladimír Darida ^{RET}	8 August 1990 (age 36)	80	8	(Czech Republic) Hradec Králové	2026 FIFA World Cup
MF	Alexandr Sojka	2 April 2003 (age 23)	5	0	(Czech Republic) Viktoria Plzeň	2026 FIFA World Cup
MF	Hugo Sochůrek	7 June 2008 (age 18)	1	0	(Czech Republic) Sparta Prague	2026 FIFA World Cup
MF	Michal Beran	22 August 2000 (age 26)	4	0	(Czech Republic) Sigma Olomouc	2026 FIFA World Cup ^{PRE}
MF	Lukáš Sadílek	23 May 1996 (age 30)	3	0	(Poland) Górnik Zabrze	2026 FIFA World Cup ^{PRE}
MF	Patrik Hellebrand	16 May 1999 (age 27)	1	0	(Poland) Korona Kielce	2026 FIFA World Cup ^{PRE}
MF	David Planka	28 July 2005 (age 21)	0	0	(Czech Republic) Baník Ostrava	2026 FIFA World Cup ^{PRE}
MF	Tomáš Ladra	24 May 1997 (age 29)	2	1	(Czech Republic) Viktoria Plzeň	v. Kosovo, 31 May 2026
FW	Pavel Šulc	29 December 2000 (age 25)	27	5	(France) Lyon	v. England, 6 October 2026
FW	Václav Sejk	18 May 2002 (age 24)	2	0	(Czech Republic) Sigma Olomouc	v. England, 6 October 2026
FW	Daniel Vašulín	11 June 1998 (age 28)	1	0	(Czech Republic) Zbrojovka Brno	v. England, 6 October 2026
FW	Tomáš Chorý	26 January 1995 (age 31)	24	7	(Czech Republic) Slavia Prague	v. Croatia, 26 September 2026 ^{INJ}
FW	Patrik Schick ^{RET}	24 January 1996 (age 30)	56	26	(Germany) Bayer Leverkusen	2026 FIFA World Cup
FW	Jan Kuchta	8 January 1997 (age 29)	31	3	(Poland) Legia Warsaw	2026 FIFA World Cup
FW	Mojmír Chytil	29 April 1999 (age 27)	23	6	(Czech Republic) Slavia Prague	2026 FIFA World Cup
FW	Matěj Vydra	1 May 1992 (age 34)	48	7	(Czech Republic) Viktoria Plzeň	2026 FIFA World Cup ^{PRE}
FW	Jan Kliment	1 September 1993 (age 33)	10	1	(Czech Republic) Sigma Olomouc	2026 FIFA World Cup ^{PRE}
FW	Vasil Kušej	24 May 2000 (age 26)	6	0	(Czech Republic) Slovan Liberec	2026 FIFA World Cup ^{PRE}
FW	Ondřej Mihálik	2 April 1997 (age 29)	0	0	(Czech Republic) Hradec Králové	2026 FIFA World Cup ^{PRE}
FW	Vojtěch Patrák	18 March 2000 (age 26)	0	0	(Czech Republic) Pardubice	2026 FIFA World Cup ^{PRE}

- ^{INJ} = Withdrew due to an injury.
- ^{PRE} = Preliminary squad.
- ^{RET} = Retired from international football.

== Player statistics ==
As of 12 November 2026
Players in bold are still active with the Czech Republic.
This list does not include players that won caps for Czechoslovakia.

=== Most appearances ===
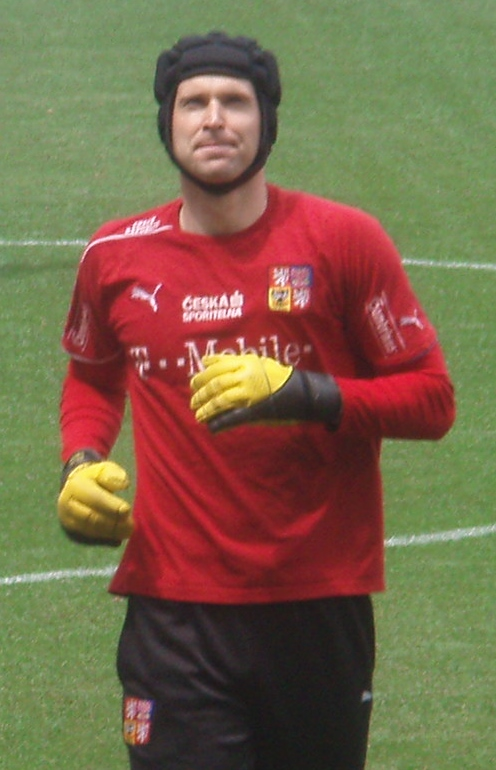
Petr Čech, the most capped player in the history of the Czech Republic with 124 appearances

Rank	Player	Caps	Goals	Career
1	Petr Čech	124	0	2002–2016
2	Karel Poborský	118	8	1994–2006
3	Tomáš Rosický	105	23	2000–2016
4	Jaroslav Plašil	103	7	2004–2016
5	**Tomáš Souček**	94	17	2016–present
6	Milan Baroš	93	41	2001–2012
7	Jan Koller	91	55	1999–2009
7	Pavel Nedvěd	91	18	1994–2006
9	Vladimír Šmicer	81	27	1993–2005
10	Vladimír Darida	80	8	2012–2026

=== Top goalscorers ===
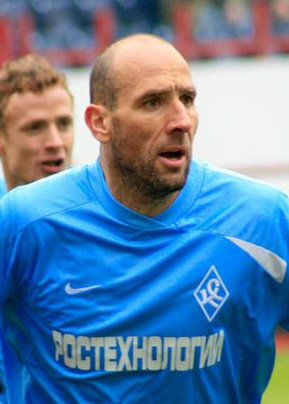
Jan Koller, the top scorer in the history of the Czech Republic with 55 goals

Rank	Player	Goals	Caps	Ratio	Career
1	Jan Koller (list)	55	91	0.60	1999–2009
2	Milan Baroš	41	93	0.44	2001–2012
3	Vladimír Šmicer	27	81	0.33	1993–2005
4	Patrik Schick	26	56	0.46	2016–2026
5	Tomáš Rosický	23	105	0.22	2000–2016
6	Pavel Kuka	22	63	0.35	1994–2001
7	Patrik Berger	18	44	0.41	1994–2001
7	Pavel Nedvěd	18	91	0.20	1994–2006
9	**Tomáš Souček**	17	94	0.18	2016–present
10	Vratislav Lokvenc	14	74	0.19	1995–2006

== Competitive record ==
=== FIFA World Cup ===
FIFA World Cup record										Qualification record						
Year	Result	Position	Pld	W	D	L	GF	GA	Squad	Pld	W	D	L	GF	GA	—
as Czechoslovakia										as Czechoslovakia						
(Uruguay) 1930	Did not enter									Declined invitation						
(Italy) 1934	Runners-up	2nd	4	3	0	1	9	6	Squad	2	2	0	0	4	1	1934
(France) 1938	Quarter-finals	5th	3	1	1	1	5	3	Squad	2	1	1	0	7	1	1938
(Brazil) 1950	Did not enter									Did not enter						
(Switzerland) 1954	Group stage	14th	2	0	0	2	0	7	Squad	4	3	1	0	5	1	1954
(Sweden) 1958	Group stage	9th	4	1	1	2	9	6	Squad	4	3	0	1	9	3	1958
(Chile) 1962	Runners-up	2nd	6	3	1	2	7	7	Squad	5	4	0	1	20	7	1962
(England) 1966	Did not qualify									6	3	1	2	12	4	1966
(Mexico) 1970	Group stage	15th	3	0	0	3	2	7	Squad	7	5	1	1	16	7	1970
(West Germany) 1974	Did not qualify									4	2	1	1	9	3	1974
(Argentina) 1978	Did not qualify									4	2	0	2	4	6	1978
(Spain) 1982	Group stage	19th	3	0	2	1	2	4	Squad	8	4	2	2	15	6	1982
(Mexico) 1986	Did not qualify									8	3	2	3	11	12	1986
(Italy) 1990	Quarter-finals	6th	5	3	0	2	10	5	Squad	8	5	2	1	13	3	1990
(United States) 1994	Did not qualify									10	4	5	1	21	9	1994
as Czech Republic										as Czech Republic						
(France) 1998	Did not qualify									10	5	1	4	16	6	1998
(South Korea) (Japan) 2002	Did not qualify									12	6	2	4	20	10	2002
(Germany) 2006	Group stage	20th	3	1	0	2	3	4	Squad	14	11	0	3	37	12	2006
(South Africa) 2010	Did not qualify									10	4	4	2	17	6	2010
(Brazil) 2014	Did not qualify									10	4	3	3	13	9	2014
(Russia) 2018	Did not qualify									10	4	3	3	17	10	2018
(Qatar) 2022	Did not qualify									9	4	2	3	14	10	2022
(Canada) (Mexico) (United States) 2026	Group stage	39th	3	0	1	2	2	6	Squad	10	5	3	2	22	12	2026
(Morocco) (Portugal) (Spain) 2030	To be determined									To be determined						2030
(Saudi Arabia) 2034	To be determined									To be determined						2034
Total	Runners-up	10/23	36	12	6	18	49	55	—	157	84	34	39	302	138	—

=== UEFA European Championship ===
UEFA European Championship record										Qualifying record						
Year	Result	Position	Pld	W	D	L	GF	GA	Squad	Pld	W	D	L	GF	GA	—
as Czechoslovakia										as Czechoslovakia						
(France) 1960	Third place	3rd	2	1	0	1	2	3	Squad	6	4	1	1	16	5	1960
(Spain) 1964	Did not qualify									2	0	1	1	2	3	1964
(Italy) 1968	Did not qualify									6	3	1	2	8	4	1968
(Belgium) 1972	Did not qualify									6	4	1	1	11	4	1972
(Socialist Federal Republic of Yugoslavia) 1976	Champions	1st	2	1	1	0	5	3	Squad	8	5	2	1	19	7	1976
(Italy) 1980	Third place	3rd	4	1	2	1	5	4	Squad	6	5	0	1	17	4	1980
(France) 1984	Did not qualify									8	3	4	1	15	7	1984
(West Germany) 1988	Did not qualify									6	2	3	1	7	5	1988
(Sweden) 1992	Did not qualify									8	5	0	3	12	9	1992
as Czech Republic										as Czech Republic						
(England) 1996	Runners-up	2nd	6	2	2	2	7	8	Squad	10	6	3	1	21	6	1996
(Belgium) (Netherlands) 2000	Group stage	10th	3	1	0	2	3	3	Squad	10	10	0	0	26	5	2000
(Portugal) 2004	Semi-finals	4th	5	4	0	1	10	5	Squad	8	7	1	0	23	5	2004
(Austria) (Switzerland) 2008	Group stage	11th	3	1	0	2	4	6	Squad	12	9	2	1	27	5	2008
(Poland) (Ukraine) 2012	Quarter-finals	6th	4	2	0	2	4	6	Squad	10	6	1	3	15	8	2012
(France) 2016	Group stage	21st	3	0	1	2	2	5	Squad	10	7	1	2	19	14	2016
(Europe) 2020	Quarter-finals	6th	5	2	1	2	6	4	Squad	8	5	0	3	13	11	2020
(Germany) 2024	Group stage	22nd	3	0	1	2	3	5	Squad	8	4	3	1	12	6	2024
(United Kingdom) (Republic of Ireland) 2028	To be determined									To be determined						2028
(Italy) (Turkey) 2032	To be determined									To be determined						2032
Total	1 Title	11/17	40	15	8	17	51	52	—	132	85	24	23	263	108	—

=== UEFA Nations League ===
UEFA Nations League record
Season	Division	Group	Pos	Pld	W	D	L	GF	GA	P/R	RK
2018–19	B	1	2nd	4	2	0	2	4	4	Same position	20th
2020–21	B	2	1st	6	4	0	2	9	5	▲	19th
2022–23	A	2	4th	6	1	1	4	5	13	▼	14th
2024–25	B	1	1st	6	3	2	1	9	8	▲	20th
2026–27	A	3	4th	6	0	0	6	3	14	▼	16th
Total				28	10	3	15	30	44	14th	

=== FIFA Confederations Cup ===
FIFA Confederations Cup record
Year	Result	Position	Pld	W	D	L	GF	GA	Squad
(Saudi Arabia) 1992	Did not qualify								
(Saudi Arabia) 1995	Did not qualify								
(Saudi Arabia) 1997	Third place	3rd	5	2	1	2	10	7	Squad
(Mexico) 1999	Did not qualify								
(South Korea) (Japan) 2001	Did not qualify								
(France) 2003	Did not qualify								
(Germany) 2005	Did not qualify								
(South Africa) 2009	Did not qualify								
(Brazil) 2013	Did not qualify								
(Russia) 2017	Did not qualify								
Total	Third place	1/10	5	2	1	2	10	7	—

== Head-to-head record (since 1994) ==
As of 15 November 2026.

Positive record Neutral record Negative record

Opponents	Pld	W	D	L	GF	GA	GD
Albania	5	2	2	1	6	5	+1
Andorra	2	2	0	0	12	1	+11
Armenia	6	5	0	1	16	4	+12
Australia	2	1	0	1	3	5	-2
Austria	5	2	1	2	9	6	+3
Azerbaijan	3	1	1	1	2	3	-1
Belarus	7	7	0	0	18	4	+14
Belgium	9	3	2	4	9	10	-1
Bosnia and Herzegovina	2	2	0	0	6	1	+5
Brazil	2	0	0	2	1	5	-4
Bulgaria	7	5	1	1	13	3	+10
Canada	2	2	0	0	7	1	+6
China	1	1	0	0	4	1	+3
Costa Rica	1	1	0	0	1	0	+1
Croatia	8	0	4	4	9	17	-8
Cyprus	4	4	0	0	9	4	+5
Denmark	13	3	7	3	13	12	+1
England	7	1	1	5	4	16	-12
Estonia	5	5	0	0	16	3	+13
Faroe Islands	9	8	0	1	19	3	+16
Finland	5	3	1	1	13	7	+6
France	4	1	2	1	5	4	+1
Georgia	3	1	1	1	4	6	-2
Germany	9	2	0	7	10	16	-6
Ghana	1	0	0	1	0	2	-2
Gibraltar	2	2	0	0	10	0	+10
Greece	4	1	2	1	2	2	0
Guatemala	1	1	0	0	3	1	+2
Hungary	4	1	2	1	5	4	+1
Iceland	6	4	0	2	12	8	+4
Israel	4	4	0	0	9	3	+6
Italy	7	2	2	3	6	11	-5
Japan	3	0	2	1	0	1	-1
Kazakhstan	2	2	0	0	6	3	+3
Kosovo	3	2	0	1	5	4	+1
Kuwait	2	2	0	0	9	1	+8
Latvia	4	3	1	0	9	4	+5
Liechtenstein	2	2	0	0	4	0	+4
Lithuania	7	6	0	1	20	5	+15
Luxembourg	2	1	0	1	3	1	+2
Malta	11	9	2	0	37	6	+31
Mexico	2	1	0	1	2	4	-2
Moldova	4	3	1	0	10	0	+10
Montenegro	7	7	0	0	17	1	+16
Morocco	1	0	1	0	0	0	0
Netherlands	12	6	3	3	18	14	+4
Nigeria	2	2	0	0	3	1	+2
North Macedonia	4	3	1	0	11	3	+8
Northern Ireland	7	2	3	2	6	6	0
Norway	9	5	3	1	12	9	+3
Paraguay	1	1	0	0	1	0	+1
Peru	1	0	1	0	0	0	0
Poland	10	5	1	4	13	12	+1
Portugal	6	1	0	5	3	12	-9
Qatar	1	1	0	0	1	0	+1
Republic of Ireland	9	4	3	2	15	11	+4
Romania	2	1	0	1	1	2	-1
Russia	4	1	1	2	7	13	-6
San Marino	7	7	0	0	32	0	+32
Saudi Arabia	2	1	1	0	3	1	+2
Scotland	10	5	1	4	14	11	+3
Serbia (Note: Includes matches against Serbia and Montenegro.)	5	2	0	3	11	7	+4
Slovakia	14	9	2	3	29	12	+17
Slovenia	5	3	1	1	7	2	+5
South Africa	2	0	2	0	3	3	0
South Korea	4	1	1	2	9	6	+3
Spain	9	0	2	7	4	15	-11
Sweden	4	0	2	2	5	7	-2
Switzerland	6	4	0	2	9	7	+2
Trinidad and Tobago	1	1	0	0	3	0	+3
Turkey	12	5	1	6	22	17	+5
Ukraine	7	2	3	2	10	7	+3
United Arab Emirates	2	1	1	0	6	1	+5
United States	3	2	0	1	7	3	+4
Uruguay	3	1	0	2	2	4	-2
Wales	6	1	4	1	5	5	0
Total (76)	370	192	73	105	650	389	+261

== Honours ==
=== Global ===
- FIFA World Cup
  - (silver) Runners-up (2): 1934, (Note: Honours won as Czechoslovakia.) 1962
- FIFA Confederations Cup
  - (bronze) Third place (1): 1997
- Olympic Games
  - (gold) Gold medal (1): 1980
  - (silver) Silver medal (1): 1964

=== Continental ===
- UEFA European Championship
  - (gold) Champions (1): 1976
  - (silver) Runners-up (1): 1996
  - (bronze) Third place (2): 1960, 1980, 2004

=== Regional ===
- Central European International Cup
  - Champions (1): 1955–60
  - Runners-up (2): 1927–30, 1948–53

=== Friendly ===
- Inter-Allied Games
  - Gold medal (1): 1919

=== Summary ===
Competition	1st place, gold medalist(s)	2nd place, silver medalist(s)	3rd place, bronze medalist(s)	Total
FIFA World Cup	0	2	0	2
FIFA Confederations Cup	0	0	1	1
Olympic Games	1	1	0	2
UEFA European Championship	1	1	2	4
Total	2	4	3	9

== See also ==
- Football in the Czech Republic
- Czech Republic national football team results (1994–2019)
- Czech Republic national under-21 football team
- Czech Republic national under-19 football team
- Czech Republic national under-18 football team
- Czech Republic national under-17 football team
