= Hameiri =

Hameiri is a surname. Notable people with the surname include:

- Avigdor Hameiri (1890–1970), Hungarian-Israeli writer
- Yechiel Hameiri (born 1949), Israeli footballer
- Menachem Meiri (1249–1306), Spanish Talmudist
