= Alberto Onofre =

Mexican footballer (1947–2025)

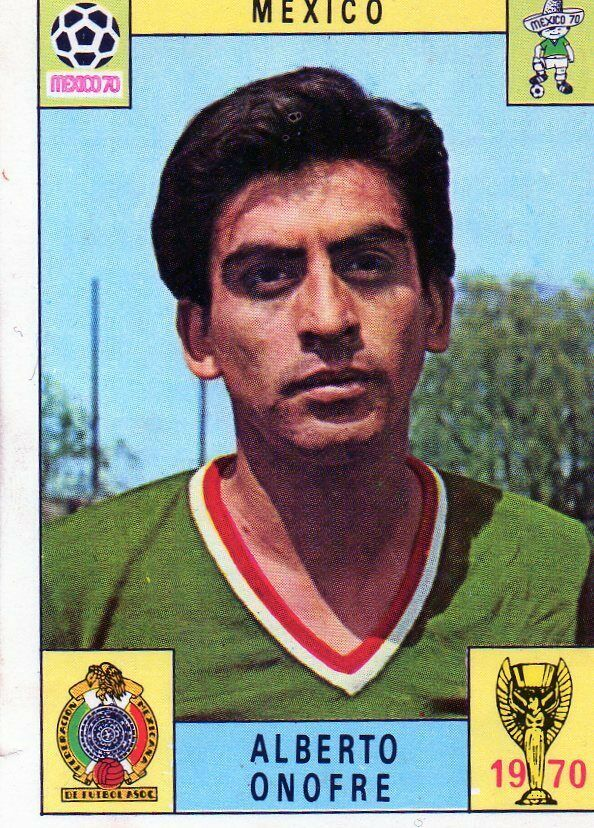
- Onofre in 1970

Personal information
- Full name: Alberto Onofre Cervantes
- Date of birth: 5 July 1947
- Place of birth: Guadalajara, Jalisco, Mexico
- Date of death: 9 January 2025 (aged 77)
- Place of death: Guadalajara, Jalisco, Mexico
- Position: Midfielder

Senior career*
Years	Team	Apps	(Gls)
1964–1974	Guadalajara		

International career
1967–1970	Mexico	6	(1)
- * Club domestic league appearances and goals

Alberto Onofre Cervantes (5 July 1947 – 9 January 2025) was a Mexican footballer. He played as midfielder for Guadalajara his entire career and was recognized as being one of the best midfielders in the Primera División with Mexican sports commentator Fernando Marcos González describing him as being exceptional in his plays as well as his passes.

== Club career ==
Alberto was born on 5 July 1947 in Guadalajara, growing up in the Colonia Fresno neighborhood in the southern half of the city. He the fifth of eleven children of Dionisio Onofre Cabrera and Rafaela Cervantes Ramírez alongside his siblings Ernesto, Guadalupe, Beatriz, Teresa, Ramón, Cristina, Rodolfo, Carlos and Arturo. Not having much in his studies, after finishing primary school, he dedicated his career to playing football as he began playing in the streets. He was first part of a local club known as "Jalisco" and played in the Liga Poniente until his older brother Ernesto met Guadalajara midfielder Sabás Ponce when Alberto was 12 years old. After deliberate hesitation from his father, he finally relented and allowed his son to make his senior debut in 1964 at 17 years of age with a fee of 600 pesos per month.

Throughout his career with Chivas, he was known for his great touch, ball possession, leadership abilities and field vision, often being the protagonist of caring many goals. Later on, he was a part of the winning squad that won the 1969–70 Mexican Primera División, the 1969–70 Copa México and the 1969–70 Campeón de Campeones. He prematurely retired following the 1973–74 season.

== International career ==
Onofre had first represented Mexico for the 1967 Pan American Games, contributing to the club winning gold. He went on to make several further appearances throughout the late 1960s in various friendlies.

By the beginning of the 1970s, Onofre had developed a reputation for being one of the best players to represent Mexico and was called up to represent El Tricolor for the 1970 FIFA World Cup that was hosted in his native Mexico. Despite already being fully called up however, four days before the opening game of the tournament, he suffered a severe injury after colliding with defender Juan Manuel Alejándrez resulting in a fracture in his tibia and would never fully recover from this injury as his plans to play abroad in Spain had to be put on hold. Following this incident, he was substituted with Marcos Rivas of Atlante as Mexico went on to initially succeed in the group stage but then to lose in the knockout stage.
