= Luis La Fuente =

Peruvian footballer (born 1947)

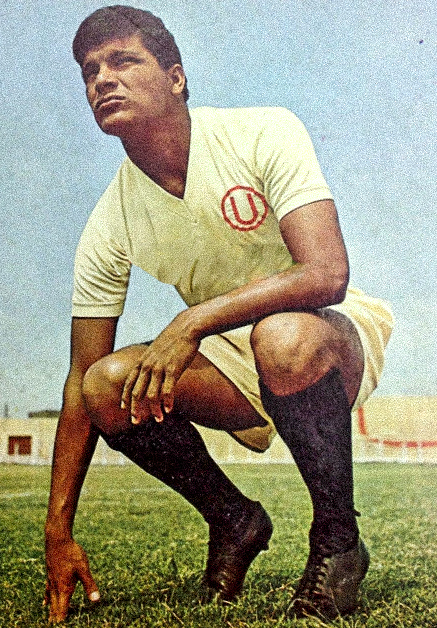

Personal information
- Full name: Luis La Fuente Ramírez
- Date of birth: June 8, 1947 (age 79)
- Place of birth: Callao, Peru
- Height: 1.68 m (5 ft 6 in)
- Position: Defender

Youth career
- Universitario de Deportes

Senior career*
Years	Team	Apps	(Gls)
1965–1971	Universitario		
1972–1975	Defensor Lima		
1975	Boca Juniors	17	(2)
1976–1977	Deportivo Municipal		

International career
1967–1973	Peru	5	(0)
- * Club domestic league appearances and goals

Luis La Fuente Ramírez, nicknamed "El Principe" (born June 8, 1947 in Callao) is a retired football defender player from Peru who played for Universitario de Deportes.

== Club career ==
He won the Peruvian league five times, 4 with Universitario Universitario de Deportes (4): (1966, 1967, 1969, and 1971) and once with Defensor Lima (1973).

In 1975, he had a brief spell with Boca Juniors of Argentina.

== International career ==
La Fuente made five appearances for the Peru national football team.
