= David Kozel =

Czech footballer (born 2001)

Personal information
- Date of birth: 28 November 2001 (age 24)
- Place of birth: Czech Republic
- Height: 1.79 m (5 ft 10 in)
- Position: Midfielder

Team information
- Current team: FK Mladá Boleslav
- Number: 19

Youth career
- 2008–2010: FK Dobřejovice
- 2010–2019: Dukla Prague

Senior career*
Years	Team	Apps	(Gls)
2019–2024	Dukla Prague	98	(17)
2019–2020	Dukla Prague B	10	(1)
2024–	Mladá Boleslav	29	(2)
2025	Mladá Boleslav B	3	(0)

International career^{‡}
2018	Czech Republic U17	2	(0)
2021	Czech Republic U20	2	(0)
2026–	Czech Republic	1	(0)
- * Club domestic league appearances and goals as of 6 November 2026 ‡ National team caps and goals as of 15 November 2026

David Kozel (born 28 November 2001) is a Czech professional footballer who plays as a midfielder for FK Mladá Boleslav and the Czech Republic national team.

== Family ==
David Kozel is the son of Luboš Kozel, a football manager and former player. David's older brother Daniel is also a footballer.

== Club career ==
Kozel was raised in Dukla Prague, where he passed through all the youth teams. He debuted for the A-team in the 2019–20 season, when the club played in the Czech National Football League. Across all competitions, he played over 100 matches for Dukla Prague. In the 2023–24 season, he helped his club to promote to the Czech First League. After the season, in June 2024, he transferred to Mladá Boleslav.

== International career ==
Kozel played for the U17 and U20 Czech Republic national teams. In November 2026, he was called up for two matches of the Czech Republic national team in the 2026–27 UEFA Nations League.

== Career statistics ==
=== International ===
As of match played 15 November 2026

Appearances and goals by national team and year
National team	Year	Apps	Goals
Czech Republic	2026	1	0
Total		1	0
