= List of international goals scored by Jan Koller =

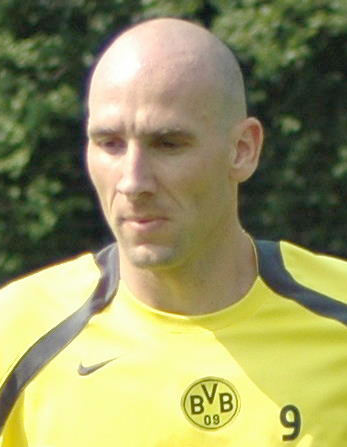
Jan Koller whilst playing for Borussia Dortmund

Jan Koller is the all-time top scorer in the history of the Czech Republic national football team, with 55 goals in 91 appearances from 1999 to 2009. He officially became his nation's top-scorer on 8 June 2005, when he scored four goals in a 6–1 win over Macedonia in 2006 FIFA World Cup qualification, which took him to 39 goals, making him the country's highest scorer over Antonín Puč (who played for Czechoslovakia). He earned both his first cap and goal in 1999 during a 1–0 friendly against Belgium. He would go on to represent his country at 3 UEFA European Championships (2000, 2004, 2008) and the 2006 FIFA World Cup. They would only make it out of the group stage in UEFA Euro 2004, but get knocked out in the semi-finals to eventual champions, Greece. He would make his second and final retirement from international duty in 2009 after a 2010 FIFA World Cup qualification match against Slovakia.

== International goals ==
Scores and results list Czech Republic's goal tally first, score column indicates score after each Koller goal.

List of international goals scored by Jan Koller
No.	Cap	Date	Venue	Opponent	Score	Result	Competition	Ref.
1	1	9 February 1999	King Baudouin Stadium, Brussels, Belgium	Belgium	1–0	1–0	Friendly	
2	4	5 June 1999	Kadriorg Stadium, Tallinn, Estonia	Estonia	2–0	2–0	UEFA Euro 2000 qualifying	
3	5	9 June 1999	Letná Stadium, Prague, Czech Republic	Scotland	3–2	3–2	UEFA Euro 2000 qualifying	
4	6	18 August 1999	Sportovní areál Drnovice, Drnovice, Czech Republic	Switzerland	1–0	3–0	Friendly	
5	7	4 September 1999	Žalgiris Stadium, Vilnius, Lithuania	Lithuania	3–0	4–0	UEFA Euro 2000 qualifying	
6	7	4 September 1999	Žalgiris Stadium, Vilnius, Lithuania	Lithuania	4–0	4–0	UEFA Euro 2000 qualifying	
7	8	8 September 1999	Na Stínadlech, Teplice, Czech Republic	Bosnia and Herzegovina	1–0	3–0	UEFA Euro 2000 qualifying	
8	9	9 October 1999	Letná Stadium, Prague, Czech Republic	Faroe Islands	1–0	2–0	UEFA Euro 2000 qualifying	
9	10	13 November 1999	Philips Stadion, Eindhoven, Netherlands	Netherlands	1–1	1–1	Friendly	
10	11	23 February 2000	Lansdowne Road, Dublin, Ireland	Republic of Ireland	1–0	2–3	Friendly	
11	11	23 February 2000	Lansdowne Road, Dublin, Ireland	Republic of Ireland	2–1	2–3	Friendly	
12	12	29 March 2000	Na Stínadlech, Teplice, Czech Republic	Australia	2–0	3–1	Friendly	
13	13	26 March 2000	Letná Stadium, Prague, Czech Republic	Israel	2–0	4–1	Friendly	
14	20	7 October 2000	Na Stínadlech, Teplice, Czech Republic	Iceland	1–0	4–0	2002 FIFA World Cup qualification	
15	20	7 October 2000	Na Stínadlech, Teplice, Czech Republic	Iceland	2–0	4–0	2002 FIFA World Cup qualification	
16	29	12 February 2002	GSZ Stadium, Larnaca, Cyprus	Hungary	2–0	2–0	Friendly	
17	30	13 February 2002	GSP Stadium, Strovolos, Cyprus	Cyprus	2–2	4–3	Friendly	
18	30	13 February 2002	GSP Stadium, Strovolos, Cyprus	Cyprus	3–2	4–3	Friendly	
19	34	21 August 2002	Andrův stadion, Olomouc, Czech Republic	Slovakia	1–1	4–1	Friendly	
20	34	21 August 2002	Andrův stadion, Olomouc, Czech Republic	Slovakia	2–1	4–1	Friendly	
21	39	29 March 2003	De Kuip, Rotterdam, Netherlands	Netherlands	1–1	1–1	UEFA Euro 2004 qualifying	
22	40	2 April 2003	Letná Stadium, Prague, Czech Republic	Austria	2–0	4–0	UEFA Euro 2004 qualifying	
23	40	2 April 2003	Letná Stadium, Prague, Czech Republic	Austria	4–0	4–0	UEFA Euro 2004 qualifying	
24	41	30 April 2003	Na Stínadlech, Teplice, Czech Republic	Turkey	2–0	4–0	Friendly	
25	42	11 June 2003	Andrův stadion, Olomouc, Czech Republic	Moldova	2–0	5–0	UEFA Euro 2004 qualifying	
26	44	10 September 2003	Letná Stadium, Prague, Czech Republic	Netherlands	1–0	3–1	UEFA Euro 2004 qualifying	
27	45	11 October 2003	Ernst-Happel-Stadion, Vienna, Austria	Austria	3–2	3–2	UEFA Euro 2004 qualifying	
28	53	19 June 2004	Estádio Municipal de Aveiro, Aveiro, Portugal	Netherlands	1–2	3–2	UEFA Euro 2004	
29	54	27 June 2004	Estádio do Dragão, Porto, Portugal	Denmark	1–0	3–0	UEFA Euro 2004	
30	58	9 October 2004	Letná Stadium, Prague, Czech Republic	Romania	1–0	1–0	2006 FIFA World Cup qualification	
31	59	13 October 2004	Vazgen Sargsyan Republican Stadium, Yerevan, Armenia	Armenia	1–0	3–0	2006 FIFA World Cup qualification	
32	59	13 October 2004	Vazgen Sargsyan Republican Stadium, Yerevan, Armenia	Armenia	3–0	3–0	2006 FIFA World Cup qualification	
33	60	17 November 2004	City Park, Skopje, Macedonia	Macedonia	2–0	2–0	2006 FIFA World Cup qualification	
34	61	9 February 2005	Stadion Z'dežele, Celje, Slovenia	Slovenia	1–0	3–0	Friendly	
35	62	4 June 2005	Stadion u Nisy, Liberec, Czech Republic	Andorra	2–0	8–1	2006 FIFA World Cup qualification	
36	63	8 June 2005	Na Stínadlech, Teplice, Czech Republic	Macedonia	1–1	6–1	2006 FIFA World Cup qualification	
37	63	8 June 2005	Na Stínadlech, Teplice, Czech Republic	Macedonia	2–1	6–1	2006 FIFA World Cup qualification	
38	63	8 June 2005	Na Stínadlech, Teplice, Czech Republic	Macedonia	3–1	6–1	2006 FIFA World Cup qualification	
39	63	8 June 2005	Na Stínadlech, Teplice, Czech Republic	Macedonia	4–1	6–1	2006 FIFA World Cup qualification	
40	64	17 August 2005	Ullevi, Gothenburg, Sweden	Sweden	1–1	1–2	Friendly	
41	68	3 June 2006	Letná Stadium, Prague, Czech Republic	Trinidad and Tobago	1–0	3–0	Friendly	
42	68	3 June 2006	Letná Stadium, Prague, Czech Republic	Trinidad and Tobago	3–0	3–0	Friendly	
43	69	12 June 2006	Veltins-Arena, Gelsenkirchen, Germany	United States	1–0	3–0	2006 FIFA World Cup	
44	72	6 September 2006	Tehelné pole, Bratislava, Slovakia	Slovakia	3–0	3–0	UEFA Euro 2008 qualifying	
45	73	7 October 2006	Stadion u Nisy, Liberec, Czech Republic	San Marino	4–0	7–0	UEFA Euro 2008 qualifying	
46	73	7 October 2006	Stadion u Nisy, Liberec, Czech Republic	San Marino	6–0	7–0	UEFA Euro 2008 qualifying	
47	74	11 October 2006	Lansdowne Road, Dublin, Ireland	Republic of Ireland	1–1	1–1	UEFA Euro 2008 qualifying	
48	75	7 February 2007	King Baudouin Stadium, Brussels, Belgium	Belgium	1–0	2–0	Friendly	
49	79	22 August 2007	Ernst-Happel-Stadion, Vienna, Austria	Austria	1–0	1–1	Friendly	
50	80	8 September 2007	San Marino Stadium, Serravalle, San Marino	San Marino	3–0	3–0	UEFA Euro 2008 qualifying	
51	83	21 November 2007	GSP Stadium, Strovolos, Cyprus	Cyprus	2–0	2–0	UEFA Euro 2008 qualifying	
52	85	26 March 2008	SAS Arena, Herning, Denmark	Denmark	1–1	1–1	Friendly	
53	86	27 May 2008	Stadion Eden, Prague, Czech Republic	Lithuania	1–0	2–0	Friendly	
54	86	27 May 2008	Stadion Eden, Prague, Czech Republic	Lithuania	2–0	2–0	Friendly	
55	90	15 June 2008	Stade de Genève, Lancy, Switzerland	Turkey	1–0	2–3	UEFA Euro 2008	

== Hat-tricks ==
No.	Date	Venue	Opponent	Goals	Result	Competition	Ref.
1	8 June 2005	Na Stínadlech, Teplice, Czech Republic	Macedonia	4 – (42', 45', 48', 53')	6–1	2006 FIFA World Cup qualification	

== Statistics ==
Appearances and goals by year
Year	Apps	Goals
1999	10	9
2000	11	6
2001	7	0
2002	9	5
2003	9	7
2004	14	6
2005	6	7
2006	8	7
2007	9	4
2008	7	4
2009	1	0
Total	91	55

Goals by competition
Competition	Goals
UEFA European Championship qualifying	18
FIFA World Cup qualification	11
Friendlies	22
UEFA European Championship	3
FIFA World Cup	1
Total	55

Goals by opponent
Opponent	Goals
Macedonia	5
Austria	4
Netherlands	4
Cyprus	3
Lithuania	3
Republic of Ireland	3
San Marino	3
Slovakia	3
Turkey	3
Armenia	2
Belgium	2
Denmark	2
Iceland	2
Trinidad and Tobago	2
Andorra	1
Australia	1
Bosnia and Herzegovina	1
Estonia	1
Faroe Islands	1
Hungary	1
Israel	1
Moldova	1
Romania	1
Scotland	1
Slovenia	1
Sweden	1
Switzerland	1
United States	1
Total	55

== See also ==
- List of footballers with 50 or more international goals
