= Fernando Alva =

Peruvian footballer (born 1947)

Personal information
- Full name: Fernando Alva
- Date of birth: April 12, 1947 (age 79)
- Place of birth: Lima, Peru
- Position: Forward

Senior career*
Years	Team	Apps	(Gls)
1967–1972	Universitario de Deportes		
1974	Deportivo Municipal		
1982–1983	Atlético Chalaco		
1984–1985	Deportivo Junín		
1974–1975	UNAM Pumas		
1976–1977	Alianza		
1975–1976	FAS		
1977–1978	Once Municipal		

International career
- Peru
- * Club domestic league appearances and goals

Fernando Alva (born April 12, 1947 in Lima) is a former footballer from Peru. He is the father of Piero Alva.

== Honours ==
Universitario de Deportes

- Torneo Descentralizado: 1971
- Copa Libertadores runner-up: 1972
