= Idris Hopi =

Czech footballer (born 2008)

Personal information
- Date of birth: 12 May 2008 (age 18)
- Place of birth: Czech Republic
- Height: 1.80 m (5 ft 11 in)
- Positions: Winger; forward

Team information
- Current team: Teplice
- Number: 21

Youth career
- –2018: SK Junior Teplice
- 2018–2026: Teplice

Senior career*
Years	Team	Apps	(Gls)
2026–	Teplice	11	(3)

International career^{‡}
2026–	Czech Republic U19	6	(1)
2026–	Czech Republic	2	(0)
- * Club domestic league appearances and goals as of 31 October 2026 ‡ National team caps and goals as of 15 November 2026

Idris Hopi (born 12 May 2008) is a Czech professional footballer who plays as a winger or forward for Teplice and the Czech Republic national team.

== Early life ==
Hopi was born on 12 May 2008 in the Czech Republic. His father, Adem, was born in Varaždin, Croatia and is of Albanian origin from Gostivar. As he is of Croatian descent through his parents, he obtained Croatian citizenship and Czech citizenship.

== Club career ==
As a youth player, Hopi joined the youth academy of SK Junior Teplice. Following his stint there, he joined the youth academy of Teplice in 2018 and was promoted to the club's senior team in 2026, where he suffered an injury. On 16 May 2026, he debuted and scored his first goal for Teplice during a 2–0 home win over Dukla in the league.

== International career ==
Hopi is a Czech Republic youth international. During the spring of 2026, he played for the Czech Republic national under-19 football team for 2026 UEFA European Under-19 Championship qualification.

== Career statistics ==
=== International ===
As of match played 15 November 2026

Appearances and goals by national team and year
National team	Year	Apps	Goals
Czech Republic	2026	2	0
Total		2	0

== Style of play ==
Hopi plays as a winger or forward. Czech newspaper Mladá fronta Dnes wrote in 2026 that "his style is un-Czech: cheeky tricks, unusual solutions, speed, penetration, a drive for goal, creativity, a feel for the ball".
