= Hadi Dahane =

Moroccan footballer (1946–2020)

Hamed Dahane
Personal information
- Date of birth: 1946
- Place of birth: Morocco
- Date of death: 13 July 2020 (aged 73–74)
- Place of death: Sidi Kacem, Morocco
- Position: Midfielder

Senior career*
| Years | Team | Apps | (Gls) |
- Union Sidi Kacem

International career
- Morocco
- * Club domestic league appearances and goals

Hamed Dahane (Arabic: حامد دحان; 1946 – 13 July 2020) was a Moroccan football midfielder who played for Morocco in the 1970 FIFA World Cup. He also played for Union Sidi Kacem.

After he retired from playing football, Dahane was a primary school teacher and became an official spokesperson for former club Sidi Kacem.
