= Abdelkader Ouaraghli =

Moroccan footballer (1943–2022)

Personal information
- Date of birth: 1943
- Place of birth: Morocco
- Date of death: 7 October 2022 (aged 78–79)
- Position: Goalkeeper

Senior career*
Years	Team	Apps	(Gls)
1962–1976	Wydad Casablanca		

International career
- Morocco
- * Club domestic league appearances and goals

Abdelkader Ouaraghli (1943 – 7 October 2022) was a Moroccan football goalkeeper who played for Morocco in the 1970 FIFA World Cup. He also played for Wydad Casablanca.

Ouaraghli died on 7 October 2022.
