= Félix Salinas =

Peruvian footballer (1939–2021)

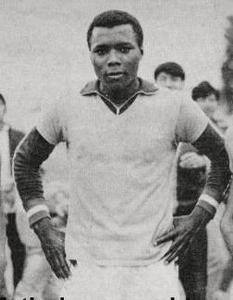

Personal information
- Date of birth: 11 May 1939
- Place of birth: Peru
- Date of death: October 2021 (aged 82)
- Position: Defender

Senior career*
Years	Team	Apps	(Gls)
- Universitario

International career
1970–1972	Peru	12	(0)
- * Club domestic league appearances and goals

Félix Salinas (11 May 1939 – October 2021) was a Peruvian football defender who played for Peru in the 1970 FIFA World Cup.

== Club career ==
Salinas also played for Universitario de Deportes.

== International career ==
Salinas earned 12 caps for Peru between 1970 and 1972.

== Death ==
Salinas died in October 2021, at the age of 82.
