= Göran Nicklasson =

Swedish footballer

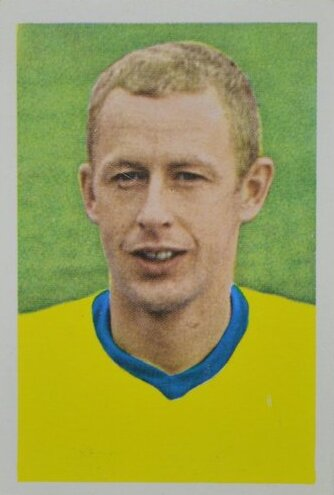
- Nicklasson in 1970

Personal information
- Date of birth: 20 August 1942
- Place of birth: Åmål, Sweden
- Date of death: 27 January 2018 (aged 75)
- Position: Midfielder

Youth career
- IF Viken

Senior career*
Years	Team	Apps	(Gls)
1963–1972	IFK Göteborg	153	(35)
1973–	GIF Sundsvall		

International career
1969–1970	Sweden	8	(1)
- * Club domestic league appearances and goals

Nils Göran "Pisa" Nicklasson (20 August 1942 – 27 January 2018) was a Swedish footballer.

== Career ==
Nicklasson played in IFK Göteborg during the 1960s and 1970s in Allsvenskan. In 1969, he became Swedish champion with the team.

Nicklasson also played for the Sweden men's national football team in the 1970 FIFA World Cup.
