= Rubén Correa =

Peruvian footballer (born 1941)

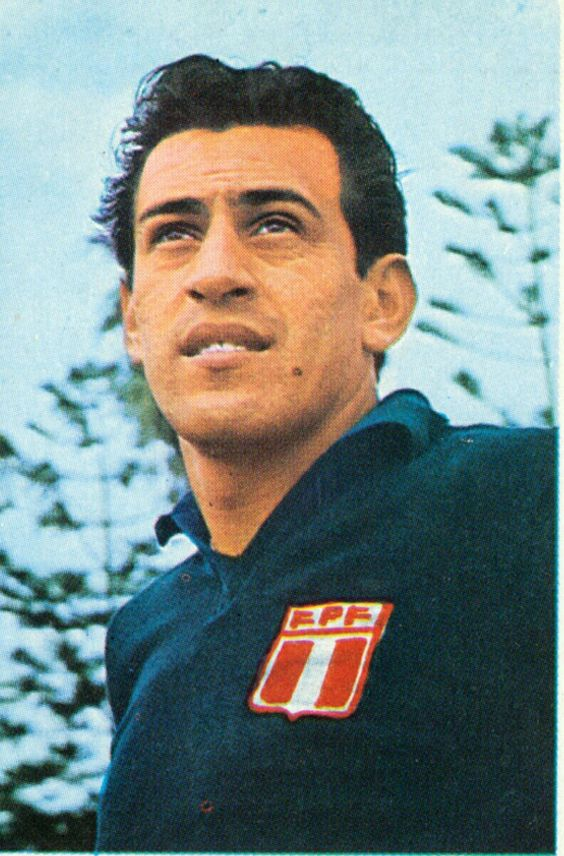
- Correa in 1970

Personal information
- Full name: Rubén David Correa Montenegro
- Date of birth: 25 July 1941 (age 85)
- Place of birth: Peru
- Height: 1.78 m (5 ft 10 in)
- Position: Goalkeeper

Senior career*
Years	Team	Apps	(Gls)
- Universitario de Deportes

International career
- Peru
- * Club domestic league appearances and goals

Rubén David Correa Montenegro (born 25 July 1941) is a Peruvian football goalkeeper who played for Peru in the 1970 FIFA World Cup. He also played for Universitario de Deportes.
