= Jesús Goyzueta =

Peruvian footballer (born 1947)

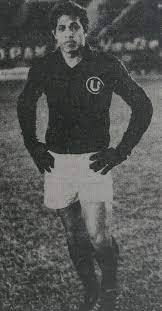

Personal information
- Date of birth: 1 January 1947 (age 79)
- Place of birth: Lima, Lima Province, Peru
- Position: Goalkeeper

Senior career*
Years	Team	Apps	(Gls)
- Universitario de Deportes

International career
- Peru
- * Club domestic league appearances and goals

Jesús Goyzueta Cárdenas (born 1 January 1947) is a Peruvian football goalkeeper who played for Peru in the 1970 FIFA World Cup. He also played for Universitario de Deportes.
