= Francisco Cámera =

Uruguayan footballer (1944–2025)

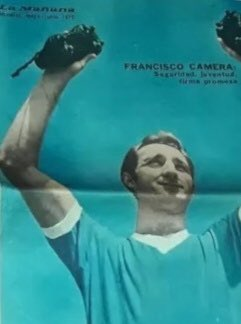

Personal information
- Date of birth: 1 January 1944
- Place of birth: Uruguay
- Date of death: 2025 (aged 81)
- Position: Defender

Senior career*
Years	Team	Apps	(Gls)
- C.A. Bella Vista
1968	Platense	10	(0)

International career
- Uruguay
- * Club domestic league appearances and goals

Francisco Cámera (1 January 1944 – 2025) was a Uruguayan football defender who played for Uruguay in the 1970 FIFA World Cup. He also played for C.A. Bella Vista. In Argentina, he played for Platense. He died in 2025, at the age of 81.
