= Walter Corbo =

Uruguayan footballer (born 1949)

Wálter Corbo
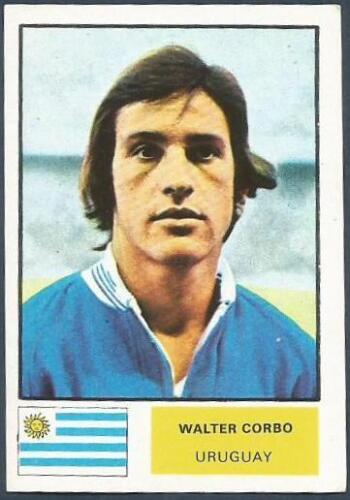
- Corbo in 1974

Personal information
- Full name: Wálter Luis Corbo Burmia
- Date of birth: 2 May 1949 (age 77)
- Place of birth: Montevideo, Montevideo Department, Uruguay
- Height: 1.78 m (5 ft 10 in)
- Position: Goalkeeper

Youth career
- 1968: CA Peñarol

Senior career*
Years	Team	Apps	(Gls)
1970–1976	CA Peñarol	151	(-)
1977–1978	Grêmio FBPA	47	(-)
1979–1980	San Lorenzo de Almagro	49	(-)

International career^{‡}
1969–1977	Uruguay	26	
- * Club domestic league appearances and goals as of 25 August 2022 ‡ National team caps and goals as of 3 May 2009

Walter Luis Corbo Burmia, known as "Corbo", (born 2 May 1949 in Montevideo) is a former professional footballer. He spent many years with Peñarol and the Uruguay national football team. Corbo also won the Teresa Herrera Cup in 1974 for Peñarol and a second time in 1975.

Born in Montevideo, Corbo began playing professional football with Racing Club de Montevideo before moving to local rivals Peñarol. He played for Grêmio FBPA from 1977 until 1978. Corbo helped Grêmio win the 1977 Campeonato Gaúcho, breaking an eight-year hegemony of Internacional. In the Campeonato Brasileiro, the former goalkeeper appeared in 47 matches, with 25 wins, 15 draws and seven defeats. In 1979-1980, Corbo played in San Lorenzo de Almagro, of Argentina, before returning to Uruguay to finish his career at River Plate.

Corbo made 11 appearances for the Uruguay national football team from 1971 to 1977.

Corbo now lives in Montevideo, where he works as an entrepreneur in the auto sector.

== Honours - International competitions ==
1. CA Peñarol
- Costa del Sol Cup, Spain: 1975
- Costa del Sol Tournament: 1974, 1975
  - "Teresa Herrera Cup": 1974, 1975
- "Mohamed V Cup": 1974
- Transportes Aéreos Portugueses Cup: 1974
- Confraternidad Deportiva Cup: 1973
  - Atlántico Sur Cup: 1972, 1973

=== Honours - Estadual competitions ===
1. Grêmio FBPA
- Champions of Gaúchão: 1977
- Rio Grande do Sul State Championship: 1977

=== Honours - National competitions ===
1. CA Peñarol
  - Liguilla: 1974, 1975
    - Uruguayan League: 1973, 1974, 1975
