= Yechiel Hameiri =

Israeli footballer

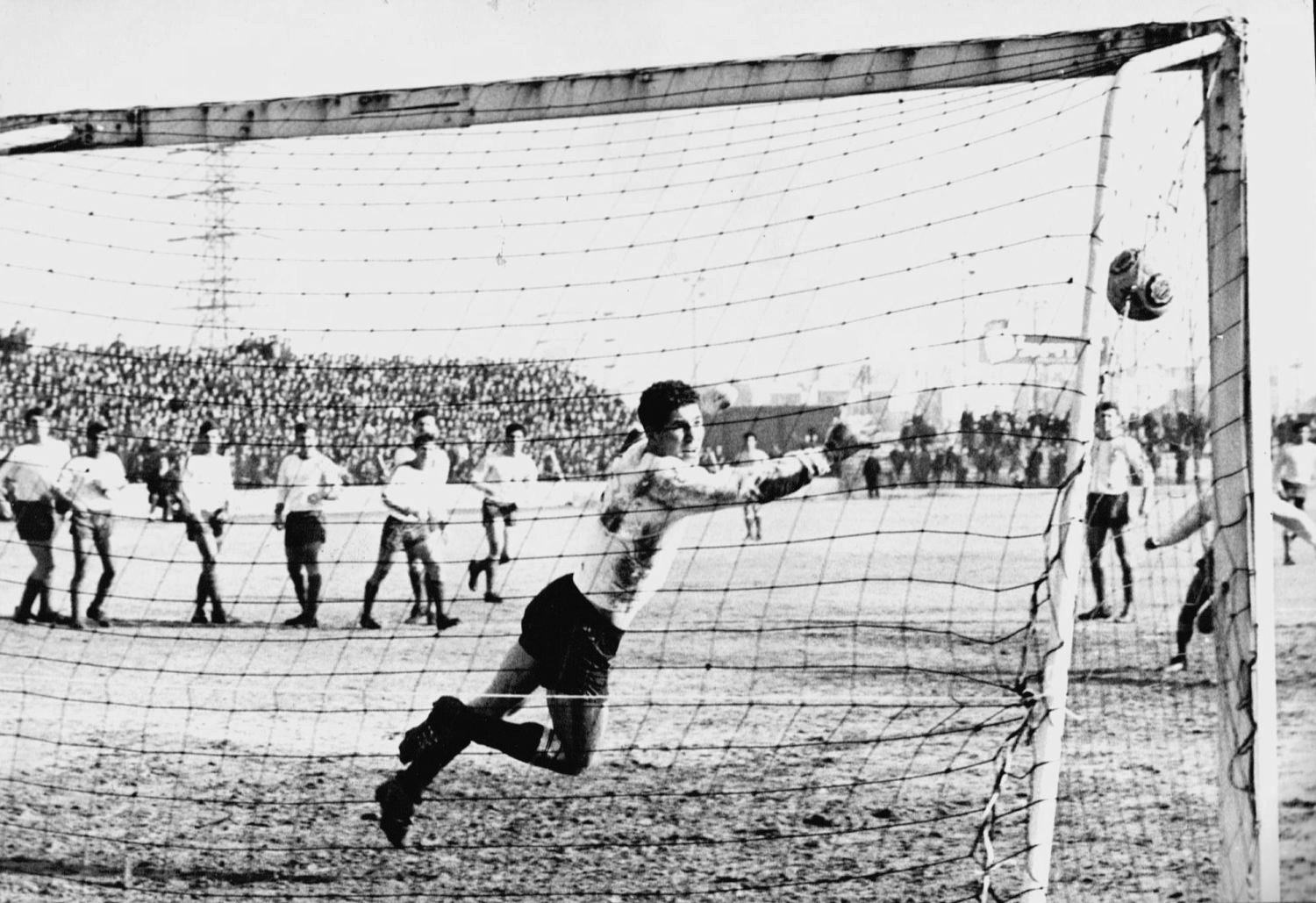
- Hameiri in 1969

Personal information
- Date of birth: 29 August 1949 (age 77)
- Place of birth: Kfar Blum, Israel
- Position: Goalkeeper

Senior career*
Years	Team	Apps	(Gls)
1968–1974	Hapoel Haifa		
- Hapoel Acre
- Hapoel Tamra

International career
1969–1970	Israel	1	(0)
- * Club domestic league appearances and goals

Yechiel Hameiri (Hebrew: יחיאל המאירי; born 29 August 1949) is an Israeli former international footballer who competed at the 1970 FIFA World Cup.

Hameiri played in one official game for the Israeli national side.
