= Héctor Santos (footballer) =

Uruguayan footballer (1944–2019)

Héctor "Patin" Santos
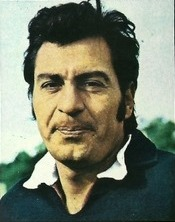
- Santos in the 1974 FIFA World Cup

Personal information
- Full name: Héctor Ignacio Santos
- Date of birth: 29 October 1944
- Place of birth: Montevideo, Uruguay
- Date of death: 7 May 2019 (aged 74)
- Place of death: Montevideo, Uruguay
- Position: Goalkeeper

Senior career*
Years	Team	Apps	(Gls)
1963–1964	Canillitas		
1965–1966	Defensor		
1967	Peñarol		
1967–1968	Aurora FC		
1969–1970	Bella Vista		
1971–1973	Nacional	8	(0)
1974	Bella Vista		
1974	Alianza Lima		
1975–1976	Liverpool Montevideo		
1977	Barcelona SC		
1978	Fénix		
1979–1980	Green Cross-Temuco	53	(0)
1981	Cerro		

International career
1970–1976	Uruguay	14	(0)
- * Club domestic league appearances and goals

Héctor Ignacio Santos (29 October 1944 – 7 May 2019) was an Uruguayan footballer who played as a goalkeeper. He was backup goalkeeper for Uruguay at the 1970 and 1974 FIFA World Cups.

== Career ==
During his club career, Santos played for clubs such as CA Bella Vista, Nacional, Alianza Lima and Green Cross-Temuco. He represented the Uruguay national team 14 times and played in the 1970 FIFA World Cup and the 1974 FIFA World Cup.
