= Jacques Duquesne (footballer) =

Belgian footballer (1940–2023)

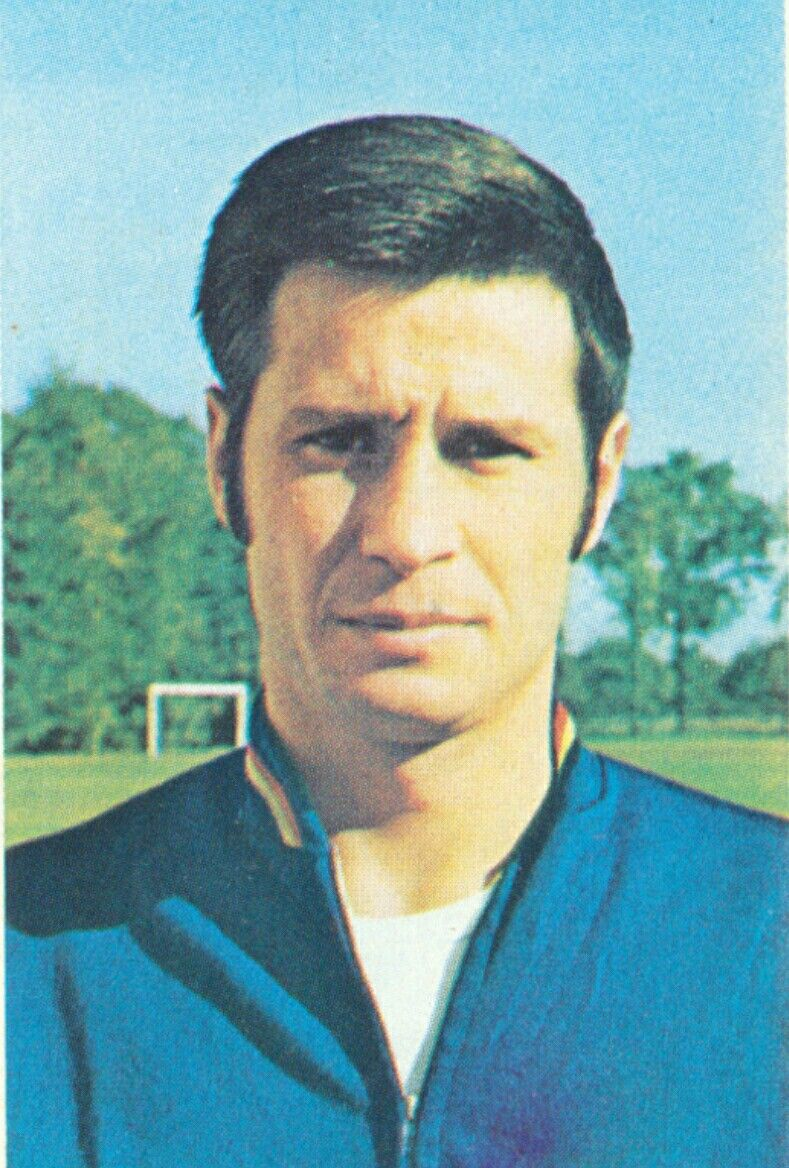
- Duquesne in 1970

Personal information
- Date of birth: 22 April 1940
- Place of birth: Marcinelle, Belgium
- Date of death: 7 December 2023 (aged 83)
- Position: Goalkeeper

Youth career
- 1954–1962: Olympic Charleroi

Senior career*
Years	Team	Apps	(Gls)
1962–1963	Olympic Charleroi		
1963–1964	La Gantoise		
1964–1979	Olympic Charleroi		

International career
- Belgium
- * Club domestic league appearances and goals

Jacques Duquesne (22 April 1940 – 7 December 2023) was a Belgian footballer who played as a goalkeeper.

During his career he played for Olympic Charleroi. He participated in the 1970 FIFA World Cup for the Belgium national team, but did not earn any senior caps in his career. He died on 8 December 2023, at the age of 83.
