= Francisco Montes (footballer) =

Mexican footballer (born 1943)

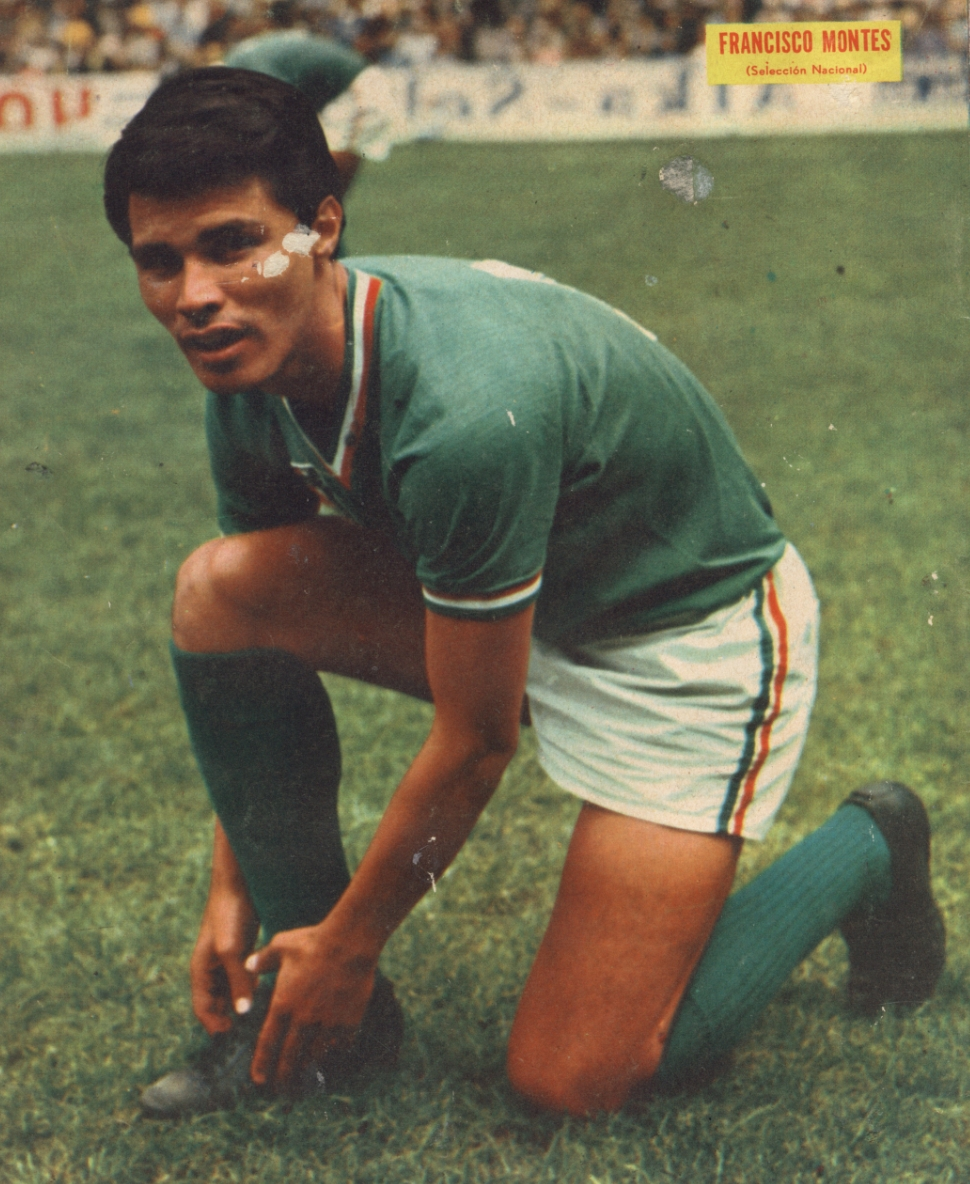

Personal information
- Full name: Sotero Francisco Montes Varela
- Date of birth: April 22, 1943 (age 83)
- Place of birth: Zacatecas, Mexico
- Position: Defender

Senior career*
Years	Team	Apps	(Gls)
1964–1972	Veracruz		
1972–1974	Atlético Español		
1974–1975	Veracruz		

International career
1970–1971	Mexico	18	(0)
- * Club domestic league appearances and goals

Sotero Francisco Montes Varela (born April 22, 1943) is a Mexican former football defender, who played for the Mexico national team between 1970 and 1971. He was part of the Mexico squad for the 1970 World Cup.
