= Marcos Rivas =

Mexican footballer (1947–2024)

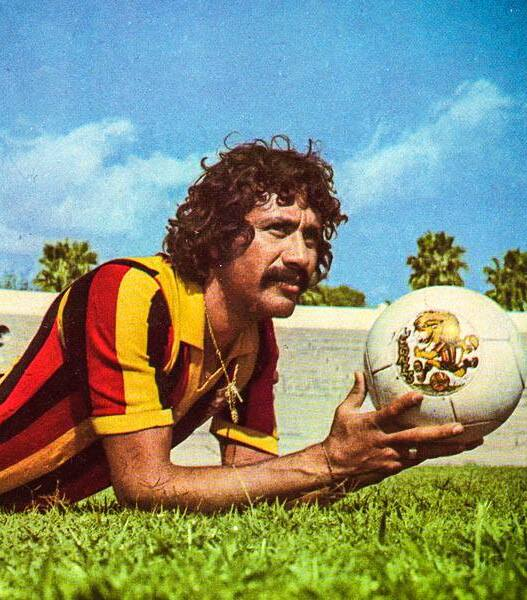
- Rivas playing for Leones Negros Guadalajara

Personal information
- Full name: Marcos Rivas Barrales
- Date of birth: 25 November 1947
- Place of birth: Mexico City, Mexico
- Date of death: 19 April 2024 (aged 76)
- Place of death: Durango, Mexico
- Position: Midfielder

Senior career*
Years	Team	Apps	(Gls)
1968–1974	Atlante		
1974–1976	Leones Negros Guadalajara		
1976–1977	Leones Negros Guadalajara	30	(2)
1977–1978	Leones Negros Guadalajara	34	(4)

International career
1970–1973	Mexico	6	(3)
- * Club domestic league appearances and goals

Marcos Rivas Barrales (25 November 1947 – 19 April 2024) was a Mexican football midfielder. He played for the Mexico national team between 1970 and 1973. He was part of the Mexico squad for the 1970 World Cup. Rivas died from complications of a hernia on 19 April 2024, at the age of 76.
