= 1970 FIFA World Cup Group 1 =

Football tournament group stage

Group 1 of the 1970 FIFA World Cup was contested in Mexico City's Estadio Azteca between 31 May and 11 June 1970. The Soviet Union and Mexico finished level on both points and goal difference, meaning a drawing of lots was required under the tournament rules to determine the placings of the teams. The Soviet Union was drawn out and therefore were ranked as group winner, with Mexico ranked in second place. Belgium and El Salvador both failed to advance.

== Standings ==
Pos	Team	Pld	W	D	L	GF	GA	GD	Pts	Qualification
1	Soviet Union	3	2	1	0	6	1	+5	5 (Note: Having finished level on both points and goal difference, the Soviet Union and Mexico were separated by the drawing of lots.)	Advance to knockout stage
2	Mexico	3	2	1	0	5	0	+5	5	Advance to knockout stage
3	Belgium	3	1	0	2	4	5	−1	2	
4	El Salvador	3	0	0	3	0	9	−9	0	

Source: FIFA

== Matches ==
All times listed are local (UTC−6)

=== Mexico vs Soviet Union ===
31 May 1970
12:00

Mexico	0–0	Soviet Union

Estadio Azteca, Mexico City
Attendance: 107,160
Referee: Kurt Tschenscher (West Germany)

Mexico	Soviet Union

GK	1	Ignacio Calderón
DF	13	José Vantolrá
DF	3	Gustavo Peña (c)	(yellow card) 60'
DF	14	Javier Guzmán
DF	5	Mario Pérez
MF	6	Guillermo Hernández
MF	15	Héctor Pulido
MF	18	Mario Velarde		(substituted off) 67'
FW	19	Javier Valdivia
FW	21	Javier Fragoso
FW	10	Horacio López Salgado
Substitutions:
MF	8	Antonio Munguía		(substituted on) 67'
Manager:
Raúl Cárdenas

GK	2	Anzor Kavazashvili
DF	7	Gennady Logofet	(yellow card) 72'
DF	9	Albert Shesternyov (c)
DF	5	Vladimir Kaplichny
DF	6	Evgeny Lovchev	(yellow card) 34'
MF	15	Viktor Serebryanikov		(substituted off) 46'
MF	11	Kakhi Asatiani	(yellow card) 30'
MF	14	Vladimir Muntyan
FW	19	Givi Nodia	(yellow card) 31'	(substituted off) 66'
FW	16	Anatoliy Byshovets
FW	17	Gennady Yevryuzhikhin
Substitutions:
FW	20	Anatoliy Puzach		(substituted on) 46'
FW	21	Vitaly Khmelnitsky		(substituted on) 66'
Manager:
Gavril Kachalin

Assistant referees:
Keith Dunstan (Bermuda)
Jack Taylor (England)

=== Belgium vs El Salvador ===
3 June 1970
16:00

Belgium	3–0	El Salvador
Van Moer 12', 54'; Lambert 79' (pen.)

Estadio Azteca, Mexico City
Attendance: 92,205
Referee: Andrei Rădulescu (Romania)

Belgium	El Salvador

GK	1	Christian Piot
DF	2	Georges Heylens
DF	4	Nicolas Dewalque
DF	6	Jean Dockx
DF	3	Jean Thissen
MF	7	Léon Semmeling	(substituted off) 79'
MF	8	Wilfried Van Moer
MF	9	Johan Devrindt
MF	10	Paul Van Himst (c)
FW	18	Raoul Lambert
FW	11	Wilfried Puis
Substitutions:
MF	16	Odilon Polleunis	(substituted on) 79'
Manager:
Raymond Goethals

GK	1	Raúl Magaña
DF	2	Roberto Rivas
DF	3	Salvador Mariona (c)
DF	5	Saturnino Osorio
DF	14	Mauricio Manzano	(substituted off) 67'
MF	6	José Quintanilla
MF	8	Jorge Vásquez
MF	10	Salvador Cabezas
MF	7	Pipo Rodríguez	(substituted off) 80'
FW	9	Juan Ramón Martínez
FW	11	Ernesto Aparicio
Substitutions:
DF	4	Santiago Cortés	(substituted on) 67'
MF	16	Genaro Sermeño	(substituted on) 80'
Manager:
(Chile) Hernán Carrasco

Assistant referees:
Rudi Glöckner (East Germany)
Kurt Tschenscher (West Germany)

=== Soviet Union vs Belgium ===
6 June 1970
16:00

Soviet Union	4–1	Belgium
Byshovets 14', 63'; Asatiani 57'; Khmelnytskyi 76'		Lambert 86'

Estadio Azteca, Mexico City
Attendance: 95,261
Referee: Rudolf Scheurer (Switzerland)

Soviet Union	Belgium

GK	2	Anzor Kavazashvili
DF	5	Vladimir Kaplichny	(substituted off) 34'
DF	3	Valentin Afonin
DF	9	Albert Shesternyov (c)
MF	11	Kakhi Asatiani
MF	14	Vladimir Muntyan
DF	4	Revaz Dzodzuashvili	(substituted off) 73'
FW	16	Anatoliy Byshovets
FW	17	Gennady Yevriuzhikin
DF	8	Murtaz Khurtsilava
FW	21	Vitaliy Khmelnytskyi
Substitutions:
DF	6	Evgeny Lovchev	(substituted on) 34'
MF	12	Nikolay Kiselyov	(substituted on) 73'
Manager:
Gavril Kachalin

GK	1	Christian Piot
DF	2	Georges Heylens
DF	4	Nicolas Dewalque
DF	6	Jean Dockx
DF	3	Jean Thissen
MF	7	Léon Semmeling
MF	8	Wilfried Van Moer
MF	5	Léon Jeck
MF	10	Paul Van Himst (c)
FW	18	Raoul Lambert
FW	11	Wilfried Puis
Manager:
Raymond Goethals

Assistant referees:
Henry Landauer (United States)
Bobby Davidson (Scotland)

=== Mexico vs El Salvador ===
7 June 1970
12:00

Mexico	4–0	El Salvador
Valdivia 45', 46'; Fragoso 58'; Basaguren 83'

Estadio Azteca, Mexico City
Attendance: 103,058
Referee: Ali Kandil (United Arab Republic)

Mexico	El Salvador

GK	1	Ignacio Calderón
DF	13	José Vantolrá
DF	3	Gustavo Peña (c)
DF	14	Javier Guzmán
DF	5	Mario Pérez
MF	8	Antonio Munguía
MF	17	José Luis González
FW	9	Enrique Borja	(substituted off) 46'
FW	11	Aarón Padilla
FW	19	Javier Valdivia
FW	21	Javier Fragoso
Substitutions:
FW	10	Horacio López Salgado	(substituted on) 46'	(substituted off) 76'
MF	20	Juan Ignacio Basaguren		(substituted on) 76'
Manager:
Raúl Cárdenas

GK	1	Raúl Magaña	(yellow card) 45'
DF	2	Roberto Rivas
DF	3	Salvador Mariona (c)	(yellow card) 33'
DF	5	Saturnino Osorio
DF	4	Santiago Cortés	(yellow card) 13'	(substituted off) 68'
MF	6	José Quintanilla
MF	8	Jorge Vásquez
MF	10	Salvador Cabezas	(yellow card) 57'
MF	7	Pipo Rodríguez
FW	9	Juan Ramón Martínez
FW	11	Ernesto Aparicio		(substituted off) 58'
Substitutions:
FW	12	Mario Monge		(substituted on) 68'
MF	19	Sergio Méndez		(substituted on) 58'
Manager:
(Chile) Hernán Carrasco

Assistant referees:
Keith Dunstan (Bermuda)
Jack Taylor (England)

=== Soviet Union vs El Salvador ===
10 June 1970
16:00

Soviet Union	2–0	El Salvador
Byshovets 51', 74'

Estadio Azteca, Mexico City
Attendance: 89,979
Referee: Rafael Hormazábal Díaz (Chile)

Soviet Union	El Salvador

GK	2	Anzor Kavazashvili
DF	3	Valentin Afonin
DF	9	Albert Shesternyov (c)
MF	15	Viktor Serebryanikov
MF	14	Vladimir Muntyan
DF	4	Revaz Dzodzuashvili
MF	12	Nikolay Kiselyov		(substituted off) 81'
FW	16	Anatoliy Byshovets
FW	20	Anatoliy Puzach		(substituted off) 46'
DF	8	Murtaz Khurtsilava
FW	21	Vitaliy Khmelnytskyi	(yellow card) 90'
Substitutions:
MF	11	Kakhi Asatiani		(substituted on) 81'
FW	17	Gennady Yevriuzhikin		(substituted on) 46'
Manager:
Gavril Kachalin

GK	1	Raúl Magaña
DF	2	Roberto Rivas
DF	3	Salvador Mariona (c)
DF	5	Saturnino Osorio
DF	18	Guillermo Castro
MF	12	Mario Monge
MF	17	Jaime Portillo
MF	8	Jorge Vásquez
MF	10	Salvador Cabezas	(substituted off) 82'
FW	7	Pipo Rodríguez	(substituted off) 86'
FW	19	Sergio Méndez
Substitutions:
FW	11	Ernesto Aparicio	(substituted on) 82'
MF	16	Genaro Sermeño	(substituted on) 86'
Manager:
(Chile) Hernán Carrasco

Assistant referees:
Ángel Norberto Coerezza (Argentina)
Ayrton Vieira de Moraes (Brazil)

=== Mexico vs Belgium ===
11 June 1970
16:00

Mexico	1–0	Belgium
Peña 14' (pen.)

Estadio Azteca, Mexico City
Attendance: 108,192
Referee: Ángel Norberto Coerezza (Argentina)

Mexico	Belgium

GK	1	Ignacio Calderón
DF	3	Gustavo Peña (c)	(yellow card) 29'
DF	13	José Vantolrá
DF	14	Javier Guzmán
DF	5	Mario Pérez
MF	15	Héctor Pulido
MF	17	José Luis González
MF	8	Antonio Munguía
FW	19	Javier Valdivia	(yellow card) 19'	(substituted off) 46'
FW	21	Javier Fragoso
FW	11	Aarón Padilla
Substitutions:
FW	20	Juan Ignacio Basaguren		(substituted on) 46'
Manager:
Raúl Cárdenas

GK	1	Christian Piot
DF	2	Georges Heylens
DF	4	Nicolas Dewalque
DF	6	Jean Dockx
DF	3	Jean Thissen	(yellow card) 29'
MF	7	Léon Semmeling
MF	8	Wilfried Van Moer
MF	5	Léon Jeck
MF	10	Paul Van Himst (c)	(yellow card) 15'
FW	16	Odilon Polleunis	(yellow card) 62'	(substituted off) 65'
FW	11	Wilfried Puis
Substitutions:
FW	9	Johan Devrindt		(substituted on) 65'
Manager:
Raymond Goethals

Assistant referees:
Henry Landauer (United States)
Rafael Hormazábal Díaz (Chile)

== See also ==
- Belgium at the FIFA World Cup
- El Salvador at the FIFA World Cup
- Mexico at the FIFA World Cup
- Soviet Union at the FIFA World Cup
