= 1970 FIFA World Cup knockout stage =

International football tournament stage

The knockout stage of the 1970 FIFA World Cup was the second and final stage of the competition, following the group stage. It featured the eight national teams that had finished in the top two in each of the four groups, and so advanced to compete in a single-elimination style tournament. A match for third place was contested between the two losing semi-finalists.

In the knockout stage (including the final), if a match was level at the end of 90 minutes, extra time of two periods (15 minutes each) would be played. If the score was still level after extra time prior to the final, then a coin toss by the referee would determine the winner. If the final was still level after 120 minutes then the match would be replayed at a later date.

The stage began on 14 June with the quarter-finals, and ended one week later with the final match of the tournament held at the Estadio Azteca in Mexico City, in which Brazil defeated Italy 4–1 to claim a then-record third World Cup triumph.

== Qualified teams ==
The top two placed teams from each of the four groups qualified for the knockout stage.

Group	Winners	Runners-up
1	Soviet Union	Mexico
2	Italy	Uruguay
3	Brazil	England
4	West Germany	Peru

== Bracket ==
Quarter-finals
14 June – Mexico City
Soviet Union	0
Uruguay (a.e.t.)	1
14 June – Guadalajara
Brazil	4
Peru	2
14 June – Toluca
Italy	4
Mexico	1
14 June – León
West Germany (a.e.t.)	3
England	2

Semi-finals
17 June – Guadalajara
Uruguay	1
Brazil	3
17 June – Mexico City
Italy (a.e.t.)	4
West Germany	3

Final
21 June – Mexico City
Brazil	4
Italy	1
Match for third place
20 June – Mexico City
Uruguay	0
West Germany	1

== Quarter-finals ==
=== Soviet Union vs Uruguay ===
14 June 1970
12:00

Soviet Union	0–1 (a.e.t.)	Uruguay
		Espárrago 117'

Estadio Azteca, Mexico City
Attendance: 26,085
Referee: Laurens van Ravens (Netherlands)

Soviet Union	Uruguay

GK	2	Anzor Kavazashvili
DF	3	Valentin Afonin
DF	4	Revaz Dzodzuashvili
DF	5	Volodymyr Kaplychnyi	(yellow card) 76'
DF	8	Murtaz Khurtsilava		(substituted off) 86'
DF	9	Albert Shesternyov (c)
MF	11	Kakhi Asatiani	(yellow card) 32'	(substituted off) 71'
MF	14	Vladimir Muntyan
FW	16	Anatoliy Byshovets	(yellow card) 118'
FW	17	Gennady Yevriuzhikin
FW	21	Vitaliy Khmelnytskyi
Substitutions:
DF	7	Gennady Logofet		(substituted on) 86'
MF	12	Nikolay Kiselyov		(substituted on) 71'
Manager:
Gavril Kachalin

GK	1	Ladislao Mazurkiewicz
DF	4	Luis Ubiña (c)	(yellow card) 59'
DF	2	Atilio Ancheta
DF	3	Roberto Matosas	(yellow card) 9'
DF	6	Juan Mujica
MF	10	Ildo Maneiro
MF	20	Julio César Cortés
MF	5	Julio Montero Castillo	(yellow card) 17'
MF	7	Luis Cubilla
FW	15	Dagoberto Fontes		(substituted off) 103'
FW	11	Julio Morales		(substituted off) 96'
Substitutions:
FW	9	Víctor Espárrago		(substituted on) 103'
FW	18	Alberto Gómez		(substituted on) 96'
Manager:
Juan Hohberg

Assistant referees:
Bobby Davidson (Scotland)
Rudi Glöckner (East Germany)

=== Italy vs Mexico ===
14 June 1970
12:00

Italy	4–1	Mexico
Guzmán 25' (o.g.); Riva 63', 76'; Rivera 70'		González 13'

Estadio Luis Dosal, Toluca
Attendance: 26,851
Referee: Rudolf Scheurer (Switzerland)

Italy	Mexico

GK	1	Enrico Albertosi
DF	2	Tarcisio Burgnich
DF	5	Pierluigi Cera
DF	8	Roberto Rosato
DF	3	Giacinto Facchetti (c)
MF	10	Mario Bertini
MF	15	Alessandro Mazzola		(substituted off) 46'
MF	16	Giancarlo De Sisti
FW	13	Angelo Domenghini		(substituted off) 84'
FW	20	Roberto Boninsegna
FW	11	Gigi Riva
Substitutions:
MF	14	Gianni Rivera	(yellow card) 67'	(substituted on) 46'
FW	19	Sergio Gori		(substituted on) 84'
Manager:
Ferruccio Valcareggi

GK	1	Ignacio Calderón
DF	13	José Vantolrá
DF	3	Gustavo Peña (c)
DF	14	Javier Guzmán
DF	5	Mario Pérez
MF	17	José Luis González	(substituted off) 68'
MF	15	Héctor Pulido
MF	8	Antonio Munguía	(substituted off) 60'
MF	19	Javier Valdivia
FW	21	Javier Fragoso
FW	11	Aarón Padilla Gutiérrez
Substitutions:
MF	16	Isidoro Díaz	(substituted on) 60'
FW	9	Enrique Borja	(substituted on) 68'
Manager:
Raúl Cárdenas

Assistant referees:
Keith Dunstan (Bermuda)
Henry Landauer (United States)

=== Brazil vs Peru ===
14 June 1970
12:00

Brazil	4–2	Peru
Rivellino 11'; Tostão 15', 52'; Jairzinho 75'		Gallardo 28'; Cubillas 70'

Estadio Jalisco, Guadalajara
Attendance: 54,233
Referee: Vital Loraux (Belgium)

Brazil	Peru

GK	1	Félix
RB	4	Carlos Alberto (c)
CB	2	Brito
CB	3	Piazza
LB	6	Marco Antônio
CM	5	Clodoaldo
CM	8	Gérson	(substituted off) 67'
RW	7	Jairzinho	(substituted off) 80'
LW	11	Rivellino
SS	10	Pelé
CF	9	Tostão
Substitutions:
FW	13	Roberto Miranda	(substituted on) 80'
MF	18	Caju	(substituted on) 67'
Manager:
Mário Zagallo

GK	1	Luis Rubiños
RB	2	Eloy Campos
CB	14	José Fernández
CB	4	Héctor Chumpitaz (c)
LB	5	Nicolás Fuentes
CM	6	Ramón Mifflin
CM	7	Roberto Challe
RW	8	Julio Baylón	(substituted off) 54'
LW	11	Alberto Gallardo
SS	10	Teófilo Cubillas
CF	9	Pedro Pablo León	(substituted off) 61'
Substitutions:
DF	19	Eladio Reyes	(substituted on) 61'
FW	20	Hugo Sotil	(substituted on) 54'
Manager:
(Brazil) Didi

Assistant referees:
Ferdinand Marschall (Austria)
Gyula Emsberger (Hungary)

=== West Germany vs England ===
14 June 1970
12:00

West Germany	3–2 (a.e.t.)	England
Beckenbauer 68'; Seeler 82'; Müller 108'		Mullery 31'; Peters 49'

Estadio Nou Camp, León
Attendance: 23,357
Referee: Ángel Norberto Coerezza (Argentina)

West Germany	England

GK	1	Sepp Maier
SW	11	Klaus Fichtel
RB	7	Berti Vogts
CB	3	Karl-Heinz Schnellinger
LB	2	Horst-Dieter Höttges		(substituted off) 46'
DM	4	Franz Beckenbauer
CM	12	Wolfgang Overath
AM	9	Uwe Seeler (c)
RW	14	Reinhard Libuda		(substituted off) 55'
LW	17	Hannes Löhr
CF	13	Gerd Müller	(yellow card) 18'
Substitutions:
DF	5	Willi Schulz		(substituted on) 46'
RW	20	Jürgen Grabowski		(substituted on) 55'
Manager:
Helmut Schön

GK	12	Peter Bonetti
RB	2	Keith Newton
CB	5	Brian Labone
CB	6	Bobby Moore (c)
LB	3	Terry Cooper
DM	4	Alan Mullery
CM	8	Alan Ball
CM	9	Bobby Charlton		(substituted off) 70'
CM	11	Martin Peters		(substituted off) 81'
CF	7	Francis Lee	(yellow card) 10'
CF	10	Geoff Hurst
Substitutions:
CM	18	Norman Hunter		(substituted on) 81'
CM	19	Colin Bell		(substituted on) 70'
Manager:
Alf Ramsey

Assistant referees:
Guillermo Velasquez (Colombia)
José María Ortiz de Mendíbil (Spain)

== Semi-finals ==
=== Uruguay vs Brazil ===
17 June 1970
16:00

Brazil	3–1	Uruguay
Clodoaldo 44'; Jairzinho 76'; Rivellino 89'		Cubilla 19'

Estadio Jalisco, Guadalajara (Note: This match was originally scheduled in Mexico City, Estadio Azteca. Three days before the semi-final the venue was changed to Guadalajara, Estadio Jalisco, despite Uruguayan appeals.)
Attendance: 51,261
Referee: José María Ortiz de Mendibil (Spain)

Brazil	Uruguay

GK	1	Félix
RB	4	Carlos Alberto (c)	(yellow card) 44'
CB	2	Brito
CB	3	Piazza
LB	16	Everaldo
CM	5	Clodoaldo
CM	8	Gérson
RW	7	Jairzinho
LW	11	Rivellino
SS	10	Pelé
CF	9	Tostão
Manager:
Mário Zagallo

GK	1	Ladislao Mazurkiewicz
DF	4	Luis Ubiña (c)
DF	2	Atilio Ancheta
DF	3	Roberto Matosas
DF	6	Juan Mujica	(yellow card) 5'
MF	10	Ildo Maneiro	(yellow card) 37'	(substituted off) 73'
MF	20	Julio César Cortés
MF	5	Julio Montero Castillo
MF	7	Luis Cubilla
FW	15	Dagoberto Fontes	(yellow card) 18'
FW	11	Julio Morales
Substitutions:
FW	9	Víctor Espárrago		(substituted on) 73'
Manager:
Juan Hohberg

Assistant referees:
Tofik Bakhramov (Soviet Union)
Ferdinand Marschall (Austria)

=== Italy vs West Germany ===
17 June 1970
16:00

Italy	4–3 (a.e.t.)	West Germany
Boninsegna 8'; Burgnich 98'; Riva 104'; Rivera 111'		Schnellinger 90+2'; Müller 94', 110'

Estadio Azteca, Mexico City
Attendance: 102,444
Referee: Arturo Yamasaki (Mexico)

Italy	West Germany

GK	1	Enrico Albertosi	(yellow card) 73'
RB	2	Tarcisio Burgnich
CB	8	Roberto Rosato	(yellow card) 38'	(substituted off) 91'
CB	5	Pierluigi Cera
LB	3	Giacinto Facchetti (c)
DM	10	Mario Bertini
RM	13	Angelo Domenghini	(yellow card) 114'
CM	16	Giancarlo De Sisti	(yellow card) 103'
LM	15	Sandro Mazzola		(substituted off) 46'
CF	20	Roberto Boninsegna
CF	11	Gigi Riva
Substitutions:
MF	14	Gianni Rivera		(substituted on) 46'
DF	4	Fabrizio Poletti		(substituted on) 91'
Manager:
Ferruccio Valcareggi

GK	1	Sepp Maier
SW	5	Willi Schulz
CB	15	Bernd Patzke		(substituted off) 66'
CB	3	Karl-Heinz Schnellinger
DM	4	Franz Beckenbauer
RM	7	Berti Vogts
LM	17	Hannes Löhr		(substituted off) 52'
AM	12	Wolfgang Overath	(yellow card) 53'
RF	20	Jürgen Grabowski
CF	13	Gerd Müller	(yellow card) 66'
LF	9	Uwe Seeler (c)
Substitutions:
FW	14	Reinhard Libuda		(substituted on) 52'
FW	10	Sigfried Held		(substituted on) 66'
Manager:
Helmut Schön

Assistant referees:
Rafael Hormazábal Díaz (Chile)
Guillermo Velasquez (Colombia)

== Match for third place ==
20 June 1970
16:00

West Germany	1–0	Uruguay
Overath 26'

Estadio Azteca, Mexico City
Attendance: 104,403
Referee: Antonio Sbardella (Italy)

West Germany	Uruguay

GK	22	Horst Wolter
DF	7	Berti Vogts
DF	6	Wolfgang Weber
DF	15	Bernd Patzke
DF	3	Karl-Heinz Schnellinger		(substituted off) 46'
MF	12	Wolfgang Overath
MF	11	Klaus Fichtel
RW	14	Reinhard Libuda		(substituted off) 73'
FW	13	Gerd Müller
FW	9	Uwe Seeler (c)
LW	10	Sigfried Held
Substitutions:
MF	16	Max Lorenz	(yellow card) 64'	(substituted on) 46'
FW	17	Hannes Löhr	Booked	(substituted on) 73'
Manager:
Helmut Schön

GK	1	Ladislao Mazurkiewicz
DF	4	Luis Ubiña (c)	(yellow card) 89'
DF	2	Atilio Ancheta
DF	3	Roberto Matosas
DF	6	Juan Mujica
MF	10	Ildo Maneiro		(substituted off) 67'
MF	20	Julio César Cortés
MF	5	Julio Montero Castillo	Booked
MF	7	Luis Cubilla
FW	15	Dagoberto Fontes	Booked	(substituted off) 46'
FW	11	Julio Morales
Substitutions:
FW	9	Víctor Espárrago		(substituted on) 46'
MF	13	Rodolfo Sandoval		(substituted on) 67'
Manager:
Juan Hohberg

Assistant referees:
Ferdinand Marschall (Austria)
Abel Aguilar Elizalde (Mexico)

== Final ==
21 June 1970
12:00 UTC−6

Brazil	4–1	Italy
Pelé 18'; Gérson 66'; Jairzinho 71'; Carlos Alberto 86'		Boninsegna 37'

Estadio Azteca, Mexico City
Attendance: 107,412
Referee: Rudi Glöckner (East Germany)

Brazil	Italy

GK	1	Félix
RB	4	Carlos Alberto (c)
CB	2	Brito
CB	3	Piazza
LB	16	Everaldo
CM	5	Clodoaldo
CM	8	Gérson
RW	7	Jairzinho
LW	11	Rivellino	(yellow card) 45'
SS	10	Pelé
CF	9	Tostão
Substitutes:
GK	12	Ado
DF	6	Marco Antônio
FW	13	Roberto
DF	15	Fontana
FW	18	Caju
Manager:
Mário Zagallo

GK	1	Enrico Albertosi
RB	2	Tarcisio Burgnich	(yellow card) 27'
CB	8	Roberto Rosato
CB	5	Pierluigi Cera
LWB	3	Giacinto Facchetti (c)
DM	10	Mario Bertini		(substituted off) 74'
CM	16	Giancarlo De Sisti
RW	13	Angelo Domenghini
AM	15	Sandro Mazzola
CF	20	Roberto Boninsegna		(substituted off) 84'
CF	11	Gigi Riva
Substitutes:
GK	12	Dino Zoff
DF	4	Fabrizio Poletti
MF	14	Gianni Rivera		(substituted on) 84'
MF	18	Antonio Juliano		(substituted on) 74'
MF	21	Giuseppe Furino
Manager:
Ferruccio Valcareggi

Assistant referees:
Rudolf Scheurer (Switzerland)
Ángel Coerezza (Argentina)
