= El Salvador at the FIFA World Cup =

International football delegation

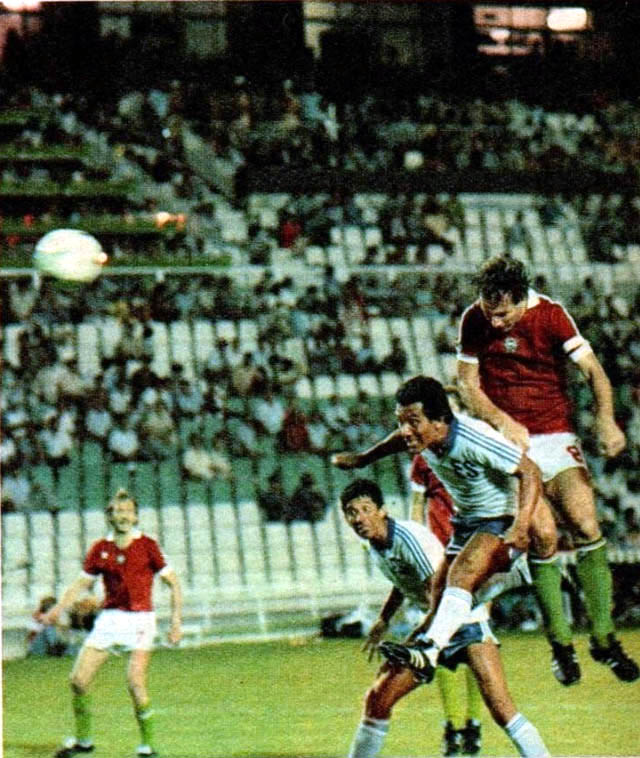
El Salvador (white jerseys) playing Hungary at the 1982 FIFA World Cup

The El Salvador national football team has qualified for the FIFA World Cup final tournament on two occasions, the first time in 1970 in Mexico and the second time in 1982 in Spain. El Salvador has played in six group stage matches, losing all six and never advancing to the knockout stage.

El Salvador qualified for the 1970 FIFA World Cup, the first FIFA World Cup the country qualified for. During qualification, El Salvador played Honduras over three matches in June 1969, with El Salvador advancing to the next round of CONCACAF qualification. The matches between El Salvador and Honduras increased political tensions between both countries, resulting the outbreak of the Football War in July 1969 causing over 2,000 deaths. After defeating Haiti over three matches, El Salvador qualified. El Salvador lost all three matches it played against Belgium, Mexico, and the Soviet Union and failed to score a goal.

El Salvador next qualified for the 1982 FIFA World Cup as runners-up of the 1981 CONCACAF Championship. As occurred in 1970, El Salvador lost all three of its matches against Hungary, Belgium, and Argentina. The match against Hungary resulted in the largest defeat in FIFA World Cup history when El Salvador lost by a score of 10–1. El Salvador's lone goal in the match, scored by Luis Ramírez Zapata in the 64th minute, remains the only goal scored by El Salvador at the FIFA World Cup.

Since 1970, El Salvador has participated in every FIFA World Cup qualification but has failed to qualify for another FIFA World Cup since 1982. The country has selected 42 players to play at the FIFA World Cup across both times it qualified, 17 of which are tied for making the most appearances for El Salvador at 3 appearances each. Hernán Carrasco was the country's manager in 1970 while Mauricio Rodríguez was the manager in 1982. As of the 2022 FIFA World Cup, El Salvador is ranked 83rd (last place) all-time for its performance at the FIFA World Cup by the Rec.Sport.Soccer Statistics Foundation.

== History ==
=== 1970 Mexico ===
==== Qualification ====
El Salvador entered FIFA World Cup qualification for the first time for the 1970 FIFA World Cup. During the first round of CONCACAF qualifiers, El Salvador was drawn into a double round-robin group against Suriname and Netherlands Antilles, winning all four of its matches. El Salvador advanced to the second round with three wins and one loss.

During the second round, El Salvador played Honduras in a two-legged tie. Prior to the matches, tensions were high between the Salvadoran and Honduran governments regarding the status of 300,000 illegal immigrants from El Salvador who were living and working in Honduras. Hondurans saw the Salvadoran immigrants as taking Honduran land and economically crippling the country, and the Honduran government announced in April 1969 that it would expel people who had acquired property under an agrarian reform who could not prove that they were Honduran citizens by birth.

In the first leg, held in Tegucigalpa on 8 June 1969, Honduras defeated El Salvador by a score of 1–0. Reports were made that hostility between fans was present during the match. In the second leg, held in San Salvador on 15 June 1969, El Salvador defeated Honduras by a score of 3–0. Before the match, Salvadorans harassed the Honduran players as they were sleeping and the Honduran national flag was desecrated. The defeat and actions by Salvadorans resulted in rioting in Honduran towns where many Salvadorans were killed and thousands fled the country; the Salvadoran government condemned the deaths as a "genocide" and demanded reparations. A third leg was held in Mexico City on 27 June 1969 as both teams had won a match; El Salvador defeated Honduras by a score of 3–2 after an extra time goal by Pipo Rodríguez in the 101st minute. Following the match, Honduras severed all diplomatic ties with El Salvador, and on 14 July 1969, the Salvadoran Army invaded Honduras beginning the Football War. The war ended on 20 July 1969 after the Organization of American States (OAS) negotiated a cease fire. The war killed over 2,000 people.

After defeating Honduras in the third leg, El Salvador played a two-legged tie against Haiti; El Salvador defeated Haiti 2–1 in Port-au-Prince on 21 September 1969 and then Haiti defeated El Salvador 3–0 in San Salvador on 28 September 1969. A third leg was held in Kingston, Jamaica on 8 October 1969 as both teams had won a match, where El Salvador defeated Haiti 1–0 in extra time. With the victory, El Salvador qualified for its first ever FIFA World Cup and became the first Central American country to qualify for the tournament.

==== Final tournament ====
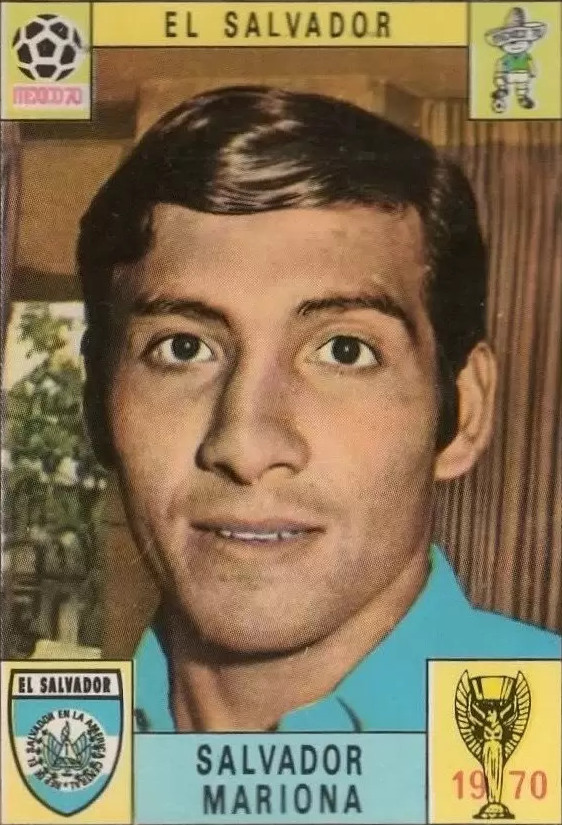
Salvador Mariona, El Salvador's captain during the 1970 FIFA World Cup

For the 1970 FIFA World Cup, El Salvador was drawn into Group 1 along with Belgium, Mexico (the tournament's host), and the Soviet Union. El Salvador's squad consisted of 22 players. Chilean Hernán Carrasco was the manager and Salvador Mariona was the captain.

El Salvador lost their first match against Belgium on 3 June 1982 by a score of 3–0; Wilfried Van Moer and Raoul Lambert scored Belgium's goals. In its second match against Mexico on 7 June 1970, El Salvador lost by a score of 4–0; Javier Valdivia (scored twice), Javier Fragoso, and Juan Ignacio Basaguren scored Mexico's goals. In El Salvador's final match, it lost to the Soviet Union by a score of 2–0 on 10 June 1970; both goals for the Soviet Union were scored by Anatoliy Byshovets. El Salvador lost every match, failed to score a goal, and failed to advance to the knockout stage.

Pos	Team	Pld	W	D	L	GF	GA	GD	Pts	Qualification
1	Soviet Union	3	2	1	0	6	1	+5	5 (Note: Having finished level on both points and goal difference, the Soviet Union and Mexico were separated by the drawing of lots.)	Advance to knockout stage
2	Mexico	3	2	1	0	5	0	+5	5	Advance to knockout stage
3	Belgium	3	1	0	2	4	5	−1	2	
4	El Salvador	3	0	0	3	0	9	−9	0	

Notes:
3 June 1970
16:00

Belgium	3–0	El Salvador
Van Moer 12', 54'; Lambert 79' (pen.)

Estadio Azteca, Mexico City
Attendance: 92,205
Referee: Andrei Rădulescu (Romania)

7 June 1970
12:00

Mexico	4–0	El Salvador
Valdivia 45', 46'; Fragoso 58'; Basaguren 83'

Estadio Azteca, Mexico City
Attendance: 103,058
Referee: Ali Kandil (United Arab Republic)

10 June 1970
16:00

Soviet Union	2–0	El Salvador
Byshovets 51', 74'

Estadio Azteca, Mexico City
Attendance: 89,979
Referee: Rafael Hormazábal Díaz (Chile)

=== 1982 Spain ===
==== Qualification ====
Qualification for the 1982 FIFA World Cup was determined via the 1981 CONCACAF Championship. During the tournament, El Salvador won two matches, drew two, and lost one. Both Honduras, the tournament's winner, and El Salvador, the runner-up, both qualified for the 1982 FIFA World Cup.

==== Final tournament ====
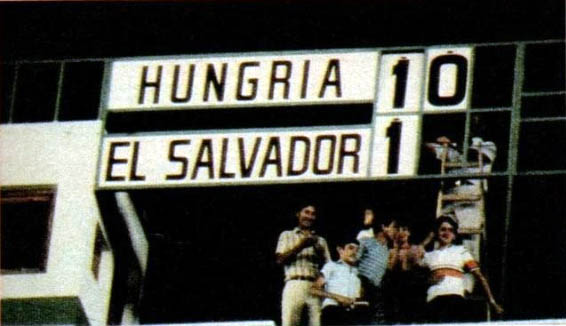
The final scoreboard of El Salvador's first match at the 1982 FIFA World Cup in which it lost 10–1 to Hungary

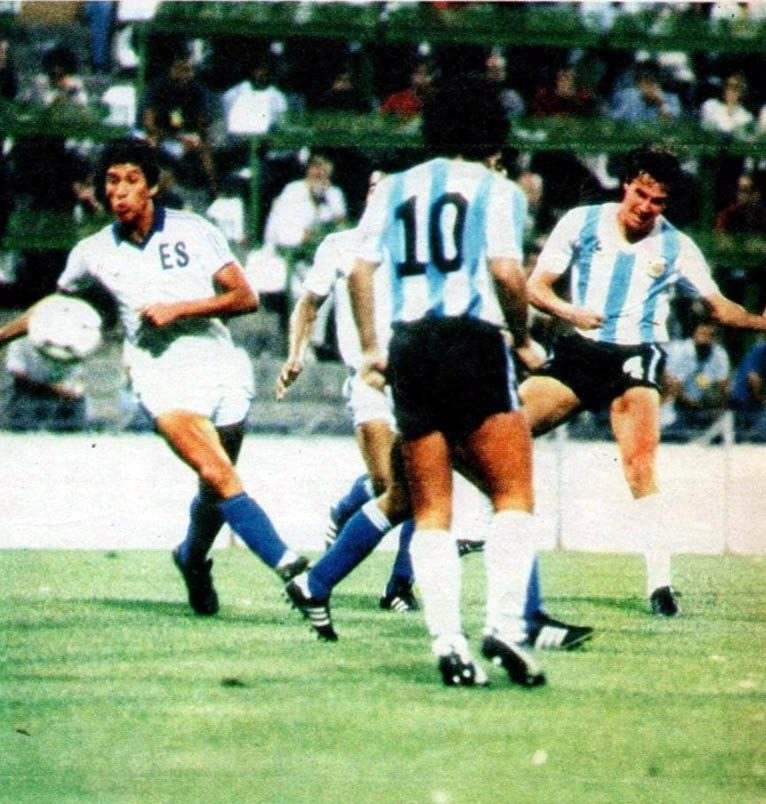
El Salvador (white jerseys) playing Argentina

For the 1982 FIFA World Cup, El Salvador was drawn into Group 3 along with Argentina, Belgium, and Hungary. El Salvador's squad consisted of 20 players, rather than the 22 allowed as Salvadoran officials decided to bring some "cronies" in their place. The players were outraged once they found out and attempted to raise money to help Gilberto Quinteros and Miguel González (the two players left behind) come to Spain, but their effort failed as they were not able to raise enough money. Mauricio Rodríguez, who played for El Salvador at the 1970 FIFA World Cup, was the manager and Norberto Huezo was the captain.

According to a survey conducted by a Salvadoran radio station before El Salvador's first match against Hungary, 60 percent of respondents believed that El Salvador would win its first match. On 15 June 1982, Hungary defeated El Salvador by a score of 10–1, inflicting the heaviest defeat in El Salvador's history as well as the heaviest defeat in FIFA World Cup history. Hungary's 10 goals, which remains the record for the most goals scored by a team in a single match at the FIFA World Cup, were scored by Tibor Nyilasi (scored twice), Gábor Pölöskei, László Fazekas (scored twice), József Tóth, László Kiss (who scored a hat-trick), and Lázár Szentes. Meanwhile, Luis Ramírez Zapata scored El Salvador's lone goal in the 64th minute. His goal remains the only goal ever scored by El Salvador at the FIFA World Cup. According to Ramírez, his teammates told him to not celebrate the goal he scored as they were "afraid that it would make Hungary angry" and result in El Salvador conceding more goals. After the match, three players—Huezo, Francisco Jovel, and Ramón Fagoaga—announced that they would determine the team's tactics for its next two matches instead of Rodríguez.

In El Salvador's second match, the team lost by a score of 1–0 to Belgium. Ludo Coeck scored the match's lone goal in the 19th minute. Prior to the match, Belgian manager Guy Thys described El Salvador's loss to Hungary as "the most shameful" to ever occur at the FIFA World Cup. El Salvador lost their final match to Argentina by a score of 2–0; Daniel Passarella and Daniel Bertoni scored Argentina's goals. El Salvador lost all three matches, scored only one goal, and failed to advance to the knockout stage.

Pos	Team	Pld	W	D	L	GF	GA	GD	Pts	Qualification
1	Belgium	3	2	1	0	3	1	+2	5	Advance to second round
2	Argentina	3	2	0	1	6	2	+4	4	Advance to second round
3	Hungary	3	1	1	1	12	6	+6	3	
4	El Salvador	3	0	0	3	1	13	−12	0	

15 June 1982
21:00 CEST

Hungary	10–1	El Salvador
Nyilasi 4', 83'; Pölöskei 11'; Fazekas 23', 54'; Tóth 50'; L. Kiss 69', 72', 76'; Szentes 70'		Ramírez 64'

Nuevo Estadio, Elche
Attendance: 23,000
Referee: Ibrahim Youssef Al-Doy (Bahrain)

19 June 1982
21:00 CEST

Belgium	1–0	El Salvador
Coeck 19'

Nuevo Estadio, Elche
Attendance: 15,000
Referee: Malcolm Moffat (Northern Ireland)

23 June 1982
21:00 CEST

Argentina	2–0	El Salvador
Passarella 22' (pen.); Bertoni 54'

Estadio José Rico Pérez, Alicante
Attendance: 32,500
Referee: Luis Barrancos (Bolivia)

== Record at the FIFA World Cup ==
The following table displays El Salvador's all-time results for the FIFA World Cup and FIFA World Cup qualification. As of the 2022 FIFA World Cup, El Salvador is ranked 83rd (last place) all-time for its performance at the FIFA World Cup.

FIFA World Cup finals record									FIFA World Cup qualification record					
Year	Host	Round	Pld	W	D*	L	GF	GA	Pld	W	D*	L	GF	GA
1930	Uruguay	Did not enter							Did not enter					
1934	Italy	Did not enter							Did not enter					
1938	France	Withdrew							Withdrew					
1950	Brazil	Withdrew							Withdrew					
1954	Switzerland	Did not enter							Did not enter					
1958	Sweden	Did not enter							Did not enter					
1962	Chile	Did not enter							Did not enter					
1966	England	Did not enter							Did not enter					
1970	Mexico	16th	3	0	0	3	0	9	10	7	0	3	19	12
1974	West Germany	Did not qualify							2	0	0	2	0	2
1978	Argentina	Did not qualify							11	4	4	3	18	16
1982	Spain	24th	3	0	0	3	1	13	13	7	4	2	14	6
1986	Mexico	Did not qualify							6	4	1	1	15	2
1990	Italy	Did not qualify							8	2	2	4	8	8
1994	United States	Did not qualify							14	8	1	5	28	11
1998	France	Did not qualify							16	5	5	6	23	22
2002	South Korea; Japan	Did not qualify							10	6	1	3	23	15
2006	Germany	Did not qualify							8	2	2	4	6	14
2010	South Africa	Did not qualify							20	8	3	9	39	21
2014	Brazil	Did not qualify							12	7	2	3	28	16
2018	Russia	Did not qualify							10	3	3	4	12	16
2022	Qatar	Did not qualify							20	7	5	8	27	19
2026	Canada; United States; Mexico	Did not qualify							10	3	2	5	9	13
2030	Morocco; Portugal; Spain	To be determined							To be determined					
2034	Saudi Arabia	To be determined							To be determined					
Total	Group stage	2/26	6	0	0	6	1	22	170	75	35	62	269	193

* Draws include knockout matches decided via penalty shoot-out.

=== By match ===
Scores and results list El Salvador's goal tally first.

Year	Round	Opponent	Score	Venue	El Salvador scorers
1970	Group 1	Belgium	0–3	Estadio Azteca, Mexico City	—N/a
1970	Group 1	Mexico	0–4	Estadio Azteca, Mexico City	—N/a
1970	Group 1	Soviet Union	0–2	Estadio Azteca, Mexico City	—N/a
1982	Group 3	Hungary	1–10	Nuevo Estadio, Elche	Ramírez
1982	Group 3	Belgium	0–1	Nuevo Estadio, Elche	—N/a
1982	Group 3	Argentina	0–2	Estadio José Rico Pérez, Alicante	—N/a

=== Record by opponent ===
FIFA World Cup matches (by team)
Opponent	Pld	W	D	L	GF	GA	GD	Confederation
Argentina	1	0	0	1	0	2	–2	CONMEBOL
Belgium	2	0	0	2	0	4	–4	UEFA
Hungary	1	0	0	1	1	10	–9	UEFA
Mexico	1	0	0	1	0	4	–4	CONCACAF
Soviet Union	1	0	0	1	0	2	–2	UEFA

== Records and statistics ==
=== Most appearances ===
A total of 42 players have been selected to play for El Salvador at the FIFA World Cup, of which, 33 have played in at least one match and 30 of which have started at least one match. A total of 17 players are tied for having the most appearances at the FIFA World Cup (8 from 1970 and 9 from 1980), appearing in three matches each.

Rank	Player	Matches	World Cups
1	Ernesto Aparicio	3	1970
1	Salvador Flamenco	3	1970
1	Raúl Magaña	3	1970
1	Salvador Mariona	3	1970
1	Saturnino Osorio	3	1970
1	Roberto Rivas	3	1970
1	Pipo Rodríguez	3	1970
1	Jorge Vásquez	3	1970
1	Jorge González	3	1982
1	Luis Guevara Mora	3	1982
1	Norberto Huezo	3	1982
1	Francisco Jovel	3	1982
1	Luis Ramírez Zapata	3	1982
1	Carlos Recinos	3	1982
1	José María Rivas	3	1982
1	Jaime Rodríguez	3	1982
1	Joaquín Ventura	3	1982

== Top goalscorers ==
In six matches at the FIFA World Cup, El Salvador has only scored a single goal, scored by Luis Ramírez Zapata against Hungary in 1982.

Rank	Player	Goals	Tournaments
1	Luis Ramírez Zapata	1	1982

== See also ==
- El Salvador at the CONCACAF Gold Cup
- North, Central American and Caribbean nations at the FIFA World Cup

== Bibliography ==
- Cable, Vincent (October 1969). "The 'Football War' and the Central American Common Market". International Affairs. 45 (4). Oxford University Press: 658–671. JSTOR 2613335.
- Courtney, Barrie (30 June 2016). "El Salvador – List of International Matches". RSSSF.
- Di Maggio, Roberto (5 March 2023). "World Cup 2022 Qualifying – North and Central America". RSSSF.
- Doyle, Paul (17 May 2018). "World Cup Stunning Moments: El Salvador Humiliated in Spain". The Guardian.
- Haggerty, Richard A., ed. (1990). El Salvador: A Country Study (PDF) (2nd ed.). Washington, D.C., United States: Library of Congress. ISBN 9780160226083. ISSN 1057-5294. LCCN 89048948.
- King, Ian; Stokkermans, Karel (5 July 2018). "World Cup 2018 Qualifying – North and Central America". RSSSF.
- Lisi, Clemente Angelo (2007). A History of the World Cup: 1930–2006. Lanham, Maryland: Scarecrow Press. ISBN 9780810859050.
- Luckhurst, Toby (27 June 2019). "Honduras v El Salvador: The Football Match that Kicked Off a War". BBC.
- Oinam, Jayanta (17 February 2023). "1970 FIFA World Cup: When El Salvador Made Central American History". FIFA. Archived from the original on 31 March 2023.
- Reyes, Macario; Lugo, Erik Francisco; Mendoza, Eduardo (16 February 2023). "VIII. CONCACAF Nations Cup 1981". RSSSF.
- Stokkermans, Karel (24 December 2022). "World Cup Final Tournaments 1930–2022 – Total Rankings". RSSSF.
- Stokkermans, Karel; Jarreta, Sergio Henrique (13 November 2006). "World Cup 1970 Qualifying". RSSSF.
