= 1968–69 Copa México =

Tournament details
- Country: Mexico
- Teams: 16

Final positions
- Champions: Cruz Azul (1st title)
- Runners-up: Monterrey

Tournament statistics
- Matches played: 61
- Goals scored: 153 (2.51 per match)

The 1968–69 Copa México was the 53rd staging of the Copa México.

The competition started on April 4, 1968, and concluded on March 2, 1969, with the final, played at the Estadio Azteca in Mexico City, in which Cruz Azul lifted the trophy for the first time ever with a 2–1 victory over Monterrey.

This edition was played by 16 teams, first played a group stage, later a knock-out stage.

== Group stage ==
=== Group 1 ===
Pos	Team	Pld	W	D	L	GF	GA	GD	Pts	Qualification
1	América	6	3	3	0	11	7	+4	12	Advanced to the final stage
2	Guadalajara	6	2	3	1	10	8	+2	9	Advanced to the final stage
3	León	6	2	0	4	7	10	−3	6	
4	Nuevo León	6	1	2	3	6	9	−3	5	

Source: RSSSF

Results

Home \ Away	AME	GUA	LEO	NVLN
América		1–1	2–0	2–1
Guadalajara	2–2		1–3	2–2
León	2–3	0–2		1–0
Nuevo León	1–1	0–2	2–1	

Source: RSSSF
Legend: Blue = home team win; Yellow = draw; Red = away team win.

=== Group 2 ===
Pos	Team	Pld	W	D	L	GF	GA	GD	Pts	Qualification
1	Oro	6	4	1	1	9	4	+5	13	Advanced to the final stage
2	Monterrey	6	2	3	1	8	5	+3	9	Advanced to the final stage
3	Pachuca	6	1	4	1	6	8	−2	7	
4	Atlante	6	0	2	4	5	11	−6	2	

Source: RSSSF

Results

Home \ Away	ORO	MON	PAC	ATE
Oro		1–0	3–0	2–0
Monterrey	3–1		1–1	3–1
Pachuca	0–0	1–1		3–2
Atlante	1–2	0–0	1–1	

Source: RSSSF
Legend: Blue = home team win; Yellow = draw; Red = away team win.

=== Group 3 ===
Pos	Team	Pld	W	D	L	GF	GA	GD	Pts	Qualification
1	Necaxa	6	4	0	2	11	7	+4	12	Advanced to the final stage
2	Cruz Azul	6	3	1	2	8	5	+3	10	Advanced to the final stage
3	Laguna	6	2	1	3	6	8	−2	7	
4	Atlas	6	2	0	4	5	10	−5	6	

Source: RSSSF

Results

Home \ Away	NEC	CAZ	LAG	ATL
Necaxa		2–1	2–3	3–0
Cruz Azul	2–1		0–0	3–0
Laguna	1–2	1–0		0–2
Atlas	0–1	1–2	2–1	

Source: RSSSF
Legend: Blue = home team win; Yellow = draw; Red = away team win.

=== Group 4 ===
Pos	Team	Pld	W	D	L	GF	GA	GD	Pts	Qualification
1	Toluca	6	3	1	2	7	4	+3	10	Advanced to the final stage
2	UNAM	6	3	0	3	10	7	+3	9	Advanced to the final stage
3	Irapuato	6	3	0	3	8	16	−8	9	
4	Veracruz	6	2	1	3	7	5	+2	7	

Source: RSSSF

Results

Home \ Away	TOL	UNAM	IRA	VER
Toluca		2–0	3–1	0–0
UNAM	1–0		5–0	1–0
Irapuato	2–1	3–2		2–0
Veracruz	0–1	2–1	5–0	

Source: RSSSF
Legend: Blue = home team win; Yellow = draw; Red = away team win.

== Final stage ==
Quarter-finals
América	0	0	0
Cruz Azul	1	1	2
Oro	2	1	3
UNAM	1	0	1
Guadalajara	1	0	1 (2)
Necaxa	0	1	1 (0)
Monterrey	1	1	2 (7)
Toluca	1	1	2 (6)

Semi-finals
Cruz Azul	2	2	4
Oro	0	1	1
Guadalajara	2	2	4
Monterrey	0	5	5

Final
Cruz Azul (a.e.t.)	2
Monterrey	1

=== Quarter-finals ===
14 November 1968

Oro	2–1	UNAM
Sánchez 49', 68'		Muñoz 38'

Estadio Jalisco, Guadalajara
Referee: Domingo de la Mora
15 December 1968

UNAM	0–1	Oro
		Durán 70'

Estadio Olímpico de la Ciudad de los Deportes, Mexico City
Referee: Abel Aguilar Elizalde

Oro won 1–3 on aggregate.

17 November 1968

Guadalajara	0–1	Necaxa
		Martínez 2'

Estadio Jalisco, Guadalajara
Referee: Vicente Medina
12 December 1968

Necaxa	0–1	Guadalajara
		Calderón 89'
Penalties
Javán (penalty missed); Javán (penalty missed)	0–2	(penalty scored) Herrada; (penalty scored) Herrada; (penalty missed) Herrada

Estadio Jalisco, Guadalajara
Referee: Ricardo Basurto

1–1 on aggregate. Guadalajara won 2–0 on penalties.

17 November 1968

América	0–1	Cruz Azul
		Munguía 12'

Estadio Azteca, Mexico City
Referee: Alfonso González Archundia
15 December 1968

Cruz Azul	1–0	América
Guerrero 25'

Estadio 10 de Diciembre, Tula de Allende
Referee: Vicente Medina

Cruz Azul won 2–0 on aggregate.

17 November 1968

Monterrey	1–1	Toluca
de Souza 11' (pen.)		Pereda 14' (pen.)

Estadio Tecnológico, Monterrey
Referee: Arturo Yamasaki
17 November 1968

Toluca	1–1	Monterrey
de Souza 11' (pen.)		Pereda 14' (pen.)
Penalties
	6–7

Estadio Luis Dosal, Toluca
Referee: Arturo Yamasaki

2–2 on aggregate. Monterrey won 7–6 on penalties.

=== Semi-finals ===
26 January 1969

Cruz Azul	2–0	Oro
Flores 27'; Munguía 70'

Estadio 10 de Diciembre, Tula de Allende
Referee: Vicente Medina
16 February 1969

Oro	1–2	Cruz Azul
Vevé 4'		Pulido 40'; Peña 79' (pen.)

Estadio Jalisco, Guadalajara
Referee: Abel Aguilar Elizalde

Cruz Azul won 4–1 on aggregate.

26 January 1969

Guadalajara	2–0	Monterrey
Calderón 30'; Valdivia 85'

Estadio Jalisco, Guadalajara
Referee: Javier Galindo
16 February 1969

Monterrey	5–2	Guadalajara
Escamilla 19', 52', 71'; Flores 54', 89'		Valdivia 58', 81'

Estadio Tecnológico, Monterrey
Referee: Domingo de la Mora

Monterrey won 5–4 on aggregate.

=== Final ===
2 March 1969

Cruz Azul	2–1	Monterrey
Guerrero 92'; Flores 104'		Chagas 113'

Estadio Azteca, Mexico City
Referee: Abel Aguilar Elizalde

1968–69 Copa México Winners

1st title
