= List of Cruz Azul managers =

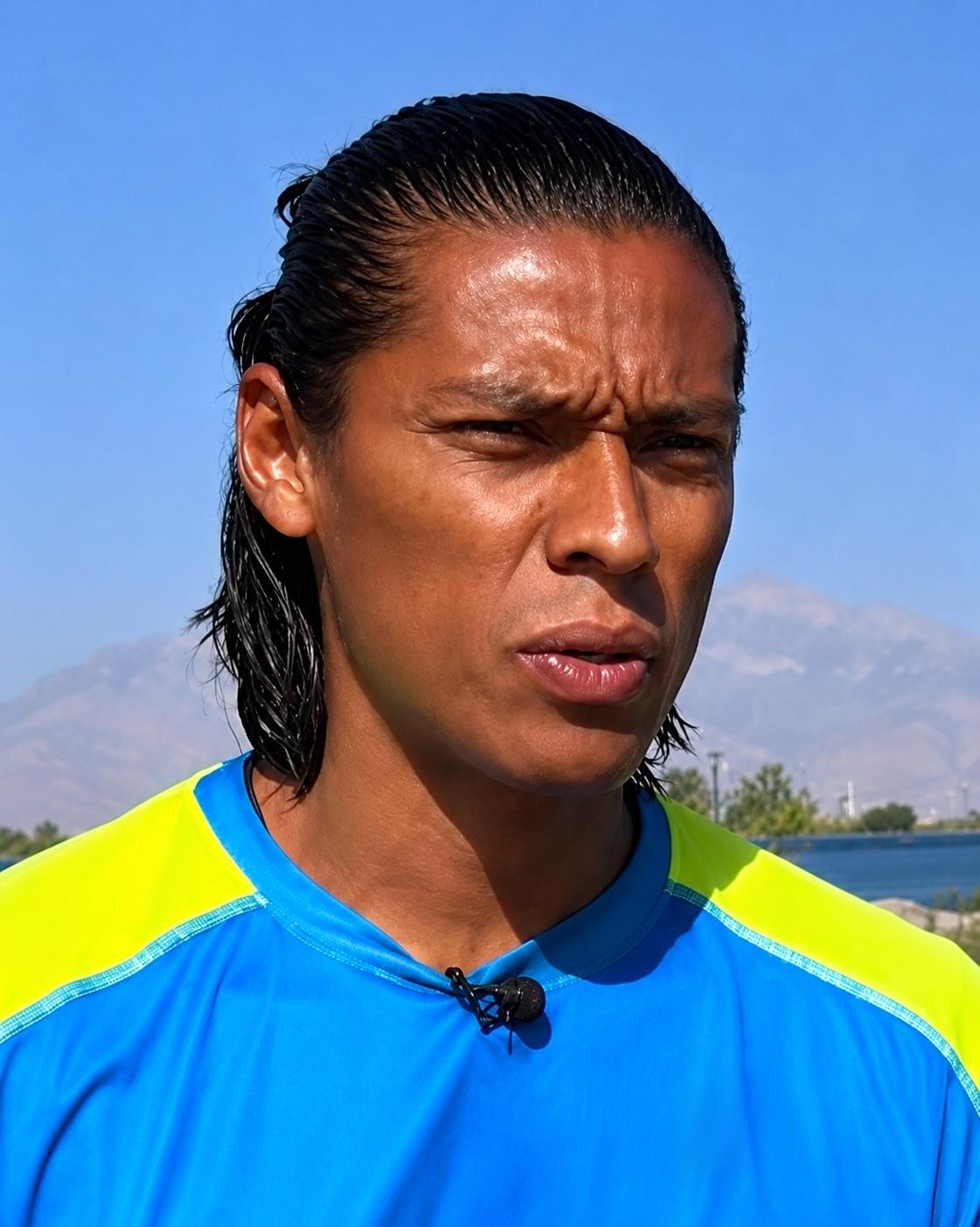
Joel Huiqui is the current head coach of Cruz Azul.

Club de Futbol Cruz Azul is a Mexican association professional football club based in Mexico City. Founded in 1927 as a works team for the Cooperativa La Cruz Azul cement company, the club was promoted to the top flight in 1964 and has since won ten league titles, four Copa MX titles, and seven CONCACAF Champions Cup titles, among other honours.

Cruz Azul have had more than 40 full-time and caretaker managers since entering the professional era in 1961. The most successful is Raúl Cárdenas, who won five league titles, three CONCACAF Champions' Cup titles, one national cup and two Campeón de Campeones titles during his nine-year reign between 1966 and 1975, the longest tenure of any Cruz Azul manager. Only five men have led the club to a league championship: Cárdenas, Ignacio Trelles, Luis Fernando Tena, Juan Reynoso and Joel Huiqui. Enrique Meza and Tena each returned to the post on multiple occasions, while Joaquín Moreno has served as caretaker manager four separate times.

This chronological list comprises all those who have held the position of manager of the Cruz Azul first team since the club's professionalisation in 1961. Each entry includes the manager's dates of tenure and, where known, the club's honours and significant achievements under their charge. Caretaker managers are included, as well as those who have held the position on a permanent basis.

== Managerial history ==
=== 1961–1990 ===
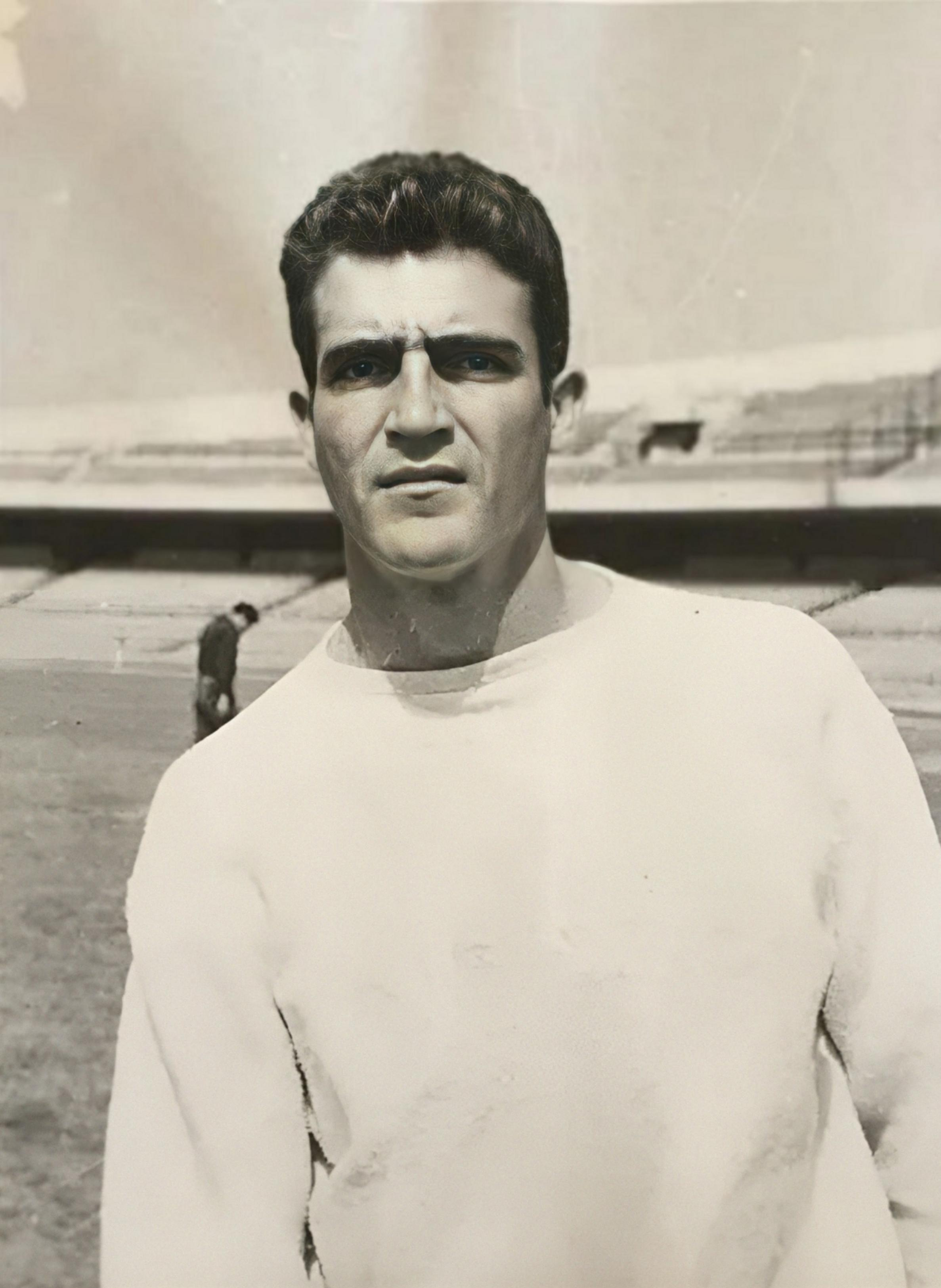
Raúl Cárdenas (1928–2016) managed Cruz Azul for a record 9 years (1966–1975), making him the most successful and longest-serving coach in the club's history.

Paulino Sánchez became the first manager of Cruz Azul in 1961, when the team played in the Segunda División. He was succeeded in 1962 by the Hungarian Jorge Marik, who led Cruz Azul to promotion after winning the 1963–64 Segunda División title and promoted to the top flight. Marik departed in 1966 and was briefly replaced by the Peruvian Walter Ormeño.

Raúl Cárdenas took charge in 1966 and transformed Cruz Azul into the dominant force in Mexican football. Over nine seasons he won five league titles, in 1968–69, México 70, 1971–72, 1972–73 and 1973–74, the last three of which formed a title three-peat unmatched by any other manager in Mexican football history. He also won three CONCACAF Champions' Cup titles (1969, 1970 and 1971), the 1968–69 Copa México, and two Campeón de Campeones titles (1969 and 1974), for a total of eleven trophies, and remains the most decorated manager in the club's history.

Cárdenas's departure in 1975 was followed by a rapid succession of managers, including José Moncebáez, a second brief spell for Jorge Marik, and Alfonso Portugal. Ignacio Trelles was appointed in 1976 and led Cruz Azul to back-to-back league titles in 1978–79 and 1979–80, the last league championships the club would win for nearly two decades. Trelles remained in charge until 1983, directing more league matches for the club than any other manager in its history.

After Trelles left, the club cycled through several managers, including Miguel Marín and the first spell of Enrique Meza. The Chilean Alberto Quintano, a member of Cárdenas's title-winning squads as a player, took charge from 1983 to 1986, reaching the semi-finals in his first season without adding further silverware. His successor Héctor Pulido, another former club captain, led Cruz Azul to the 1986–87 final, which the club lost to Guadalajara, before being dismissed the following season. Manuel Lapuente and Mario Velarde followed in 1988, with Velarde's Cruz Azul reaching the 1988–89 final, where they again lost to América.

=== 1990–2015 ===
The 1990s brought further managerial turnover, with brief tenures for the caretaker Axel Bierbaum, the Chilean Ignacio Prieto and his compatriot Nelson Acosta, before Meza returned for a second stint from 1992 to 1995. Luis Fernando Tena took over in 1995 and won the 1996 CONCACAF Champions' Cup before departing the following year. Víctor Manuel Vucetich then led Cruz Azul to their second national cup title in the 1996–97 Copa México, his only trophy in a single season with the club.

Tena returned for a second spell in 1997 (following a brief caretaker period under Jesús del Muro, who won four of his eight matches in charge) and guided the club to its eighth league title in the Invierno 1997 tournament, as well as the 1997 CONCACAF Champions' Cup; his side also lost the 1999 final to Pachuca.

José Luis Trejo succeeded Tena in March 2000 and led Cruz Azul to the final of the 2001 Copa Libertadores, the first Mexican club to reach that stage of the South American competition. After Mario Carrillo's brief tenure in early 2003, Meza returned for a third spell, followed by a fourth stint for Tena later that year.

José Luis Saldívar took over as caretaker in October 2004. The Argentine Rubén Omar Romano was appointed in January 2005, but his tenure was overshadowed by tragedy: on 19 July 2005, Romano was kidnapped by an armed group as he left the club's La Noria training facility and held hostage for 65 days before being rescued by federal agents in a raid in Iztapalapa. During his captivity, assistant manager Isaac Mizrahi Smeke took charge of the team, and was formally appointed manager following Romano's departure from the club in December 2005.

Sergio Markarián led Cruz Azul to their first league final in nearly a decade in the Clausura 2008, losing to Santos Laguna after the club had been unable to agree personnel plans with him, prompting his departure. His successor and former assistant, Benjamín Galindo, lost two further finals: the Apertura 2008 league final against Toluca and the 2009 CONCACAF Champions League final against Atlante. Following a brief caretaker spell for Robert Siboldi, Meza returned for a fourth and final stint from 2009 to 2012, during which Cruz Azul again reached a league final—losing to Monterrey in 2010—and the 2010 CONCACAF Champions League final, where they were beaten by Pachuca.

Guillermo Vázquez won the club's third national cup title in the Clausura 2013 Copa MX, defeating Atlante on penalties, and later reached the Clausura 2013 league final, which Cruz Azul lost to América on penalties. Tena, in his fourth spell in charge, then guided Cruz Azul to the 2013–14 CONCACAF Champions League title in 2014, the club's first CONCACAF crown in over four decades. After a brief tenure for Sergio Bueno and a caretaker spell for Joaquín Moreno, Tomás Boy was appointed on 2 October 2015.

=== 2016–present ===
Boy failed to reach the postseason in any of his three tournaments in charge and was dismissed on 22 October 2016. Moreno again took interim charge before Paco Jémez was appointed in November 2016 as the first Spanish manager in the club's history. Jémez led Cruz Azul back to the liguilla in the Apertura 2017 tournament, the club's first postseason appearance since the Clausura 2014, before being eliminated by América in the quarter-finals; he left the club by mutual agreement in November 2017. The Portuguese Pedro Caixinha succeeded Jémez in December 2017 and won the club's fourth national cup title in the Apertura 2018 Copa MX, as well as the 2019 Supercopa MX, and led Cruz Azul to its first league final since Clausura 2013.

Siboldi returned for a second, full-time spell in September 2019 and won the inaugural edition of the 2019 Leagues Cup. After Siboldi resigned in December 2020, under-20 coach Armando González took charge on an interim basis for the CONCACAF Champions League quarter-final against Los Angeles FC. González was succeeded in January 2021 by the Peruvian Juan Reynoso, who ended the club's 23-year wait for a league title. Reynoso's side set a Liga MX record of 12 consecutive wins, equalling the mark set by Necaxa in 1934–35 and matched by León, on the way to winning the club's ninth league title in the Guardianes 2021 tournament and a third 2021 Campeón de Campeones title. The Uruguayan Diego Aguirre briefly succeeded Reynoso in 2022 and won the inaugural Supercopa de la Liga MX.

Raúl Gutiérrez took interim charge following Aguirre's departure in August 2022 and was ratified as permanent manager in December, but was dismissed in February 2023 after a poor start to the Clausura 2023 tournament. A further caretaker spell for Moreno preceded the appointment of the Brazilian Ricardo Ferretti, who lasted six months before being dismissed following elimination from the Leagues Cup in August 2023. Moreno was then given the position on a full-time basis in August 2023.

The Argentine Martín Anselmi was appointed in December 2023 and, in the Apertura 2024 tournament, guided Cruz Azul to a record-breaking regular season of 42 points from 17 matches, the highest total achieved under the short-tournament format, before the team was eliminated by América in the semi-finals.

Anselmi departed in January 2025 and was replaced by the Uruguayan Vicente Sánchez, who led Cruz Azul to the 2025 CONCACAF Champions Cup title with a 5–0 win over Vancouver Whitecaps FC in the final, the club's seventh CONCACAF crown, drawing them level with América as the competition's all-time leaders. Sánchez left the club by mutual agreement shortly afterwards.

Nicolás Larcamón was appointed in June 2025. Despite leading the club to the top of the table during the Clausura 2026 tournament, he was dismissed on 22 April 2026 following a nine-match winless run across Liga MX and the CONCACAF Champions Cup. Assistant coach Joel Huiqui was named interim manager for the remainder of the tournament. With only seven matches in charge, Huiqui led Cruz Azul to the Clausura 2026 final, defeating Pumas UNAM 2–1 on aggregate to win the club's tenth league title and its fourth Campeón de Campeones title, becoming the fifth manager in Cruz Azul's history to win the league. Huiqui was subsequently confirmed as permanent manager ahead of the 2026–27 Liga MX season.

== Managers ==
Key
*	Caretaker/interim manager

Cruz Azul managers
Name	Nat.	From	To	Notes	Ref.
Paulino Sánchez	MEX	1961	1962	First coach to manage Cruz Azul in their professional era.	
Jorge Marik	HUN	1962	1966	Promoted the team to the Primera División after winning the Segunda División in the 1963–64 season.	
Walter Ormeño	PER	1966	1966		
Raúl Cárdenas	MEX	1966	1975	Won five league titles (1968–69, México 1970, 1971–72, 1972–73 and 1973–74), three CONCACAF Champions' Cup titles (1969, 1970 and 1971), one national cup title (1968–69), and two Campeón de Campeones titles (1969 and 1974).	
Paulino Sánchez^{*}	(Mexico) MEX	1970	1970	Caretaker for the first stage of the México 1970 tournament, while Cárdenas managed Mexico at the 1970 FIFA World Cup.	
José Moncebáez	MEX	1975	1976		
Jorge Marik	HUN	1976	1976		
Alfonso Portugal	MEX	1976	1976		
Ignacio Trelles	MEX	1976	1982	Won two league titles (1978–79 and 1979–80).	
Miguel Marín	ARG	1982	1982	Suspended for a year after headbutting a referee.	
Enrique Meza	MEX	1982	1983	First of four tenures at the club.	
Alberto Quintano	CHI	1983	1986	Reached the semi-finals in his first season in charge; won three league titles and a Campeón de Campeones title as a player under Cárdenas.	
Héctor Pulido	MEX	1986	1988	Led Cruz Azul to the 1986–87 final, which the club lost to Guadalajara.	
Manuel Lapuente	MEX	1988	1988		
Mario Velarde	MEX	1988	1990	Lost the 1988–89 final against América.	
Axel Bierbaum^{*}	GER	1990	1990		
Ignacio Prieto	CHI	1990	1992		
Nelson Acosta	URU	1 July 1992	31 December 1992		
Enrique Meza	MEX	1 July 1992	29 January 1995	Second tenure at the club.	
Luis Fernando Tena	MEX	1995	1996	Won the 1996 CONCACAF Champions' Cup.	
Víctor Manuel Vucetich	MEX	1 July 1996	9 March 1997	Won the second national cup title (1996–97 Copa México).	
Jesús del Muro^{*}	MEX	1997	1997		
Luis Fernando Tena	MEX	1997	2000	Won Cruz Azul's eighth league title (Invierno 1997), and the 1997 CONCACAF Champions' Cup. Lost a league final against Pachuca in 1999.	
José Luis Trejo	MEX	31 March 2000	31 December 2002	Led Cruz Azul to the Copa Libertadores final in 2001, lost on penalties to Boca Juniors.	
Mario Carrillo	MEX	1 January 2003	7 March 2003	Dismissed, along with the entire playing squad, after a heavy Copa Libertadores defeat.	
Enrique Meza	MEX	15 March 2003	7 March 2004		
Luis Fernando Tena	MEX	12 March 2004	17 October 2004		
José Luis Saldívar^{*}	MEX	19 October 2004	December 2004		
Rubén Omar Romano	ARG	January 2005	15 December 2005	Kidnapped and held hostage for 65 days during his tenure.	
Isaac Mizrahi Smeke	MEX	15 December 2005	20 May 2007		
Sergio Markarián	URU	1 July 2007	30 June 2008	Led Cruz Azul to a final after nearly 10 years, lost against Santos Laguna.	
Benjamín Galindo	MEX	1 July 2008	5 May 2009	Lost two finals with Cruz Azul: one against Toluca in the league final, and another against Atlante in the 2009 CONCACAF Champions League final.	
Robert Siboldi^{*}	URU	5 May 2009	9 May 2009		
Enrique Meza	MEX	1 July 2009	30 June 2012	Led the team to another league final, but lost against Monterrey, and also reached the 2010 CONCACAF Champions League final, where they were defeated by Pachuca.	
Guillermo Vázquez	MEX	1 July 2012	3 December 2013	Won the third national cup title (Clausura 2013 Copa MX) on penalties against Atlante, and lost the Clausura 2013 league final on penalties to América.	
Luis Fernando Tena	MEX	4 December 2013	19 May 2015	Won the 2013–14 CONCACAF Champions League.	
Sergio Bueno	MEX	1 June 2015	28 September 2015		
Joaquín Moreno^{*}	MEX	30 September 2015	2 October 2015	First of four caretaker spells at the club.	
Tomás Boy	MEX	2 October 2015	22 October 2016	Failed to reach the postseason in three tournaments in charge.	
Joaquín Moreno^{*}	MEX	23 October 2016	28 November 2016		
Paco Jémez	ESP	28 November 2016	27 November 2017	First Spanish manager in Cruz Azul's history. Led Cruz Azul to first liguilla appearance since Clausura 2014 in the Apertura 2017 season.	
Pedro Caixinha	POR	5 December 2017	2 September 2019	Won the fourth national cup title (Apertura 2018 Copa MX), the 2019 Supercopa MX, and led Cruz Azul to the first league final since Clausura 2013.	
Robert Siboldi	URU	6 September 2019	11 December 2020	Won the inaugural edition of the Leagues Cup.	
Armando González^{*}	MEX	11 December 2020	7 January 2021	Under-20 coach; managed the team in the 2020 CONCACAF Champions League quarter-final against Los Angeles FC after Siboldi's resignation.	
Juan Reynoso	PER	7 January 2021	19 May 2022	Tied league record for consecutive wins (12). Won the club's ninth league title (Guardianes 2021) and third Campeón de Campeones title.	
Diego Aguirre	URU	30 May 2022	21 August 2022	Won the inaugural edition of the Supercopa de la Liga MX.	
Raúl Gutiérrez	MEX	22 August 2022	13 February 2023	Interim spell, ratified as permanent manager on 6 December 2022.	
Joaquín Moreno^{*}	MEX	14 February 2023	22 February 2023		
Ricardo Ferretti	BRA	22 February 2023	7 August 2023	Dismissed following elimination from the Leagues Cup.	
Joaquín Moreno	MEX	8 August 2023	19 December 2023	Fourth and final caretaker/full-time spell at the club.	
Martín Anselmi	ARG	20 December 2023	24 January 2025	Set a Liga MX record for most points (42) in a short tournament (Apertura 2024); eliminated by América in the semi-finals.	
Vicente Sánchez	URU	25 January 2025	6 June 2025	Won the 2025 CONCACAF Champions Cup, defeating Vancouver Whitecaps FC 5–0 in the final.	
Nicolás Larcamón	ARG	16 June 2025	22 April 2026	Dismissed following a nine-match winless run across Liga MX and the CONCACAF Champions Cup.	
Joel Huiqui	MEX	22 April 2026	present	Won the club's tenth league title (Clausura 2026) and fourth Campeón de Campeones title.	
