= Francisco Zamora =

Salvadoran footballer (1939–2002)

Personal information
- Full name: Francisco Zamora Salinas
- Date of birth: 28 October 1939
- Place of birth: TBA, Honduras
- Date of death: April 8, 2002 (aged 62)
- Place of death: San Salvador, El Salvador
- Position: Defender

Senior career*
Years	Team	Apps	(Gls)
1959	Hibueras FC		
1960	Deportivo Marquense		
1961	Municipal		
1962	Municipal de Sonsonate		
1964–1972	Alianza		
1973	Fuerte San Francisco		

International career
- El Salvador

Managerial career
- Platense
- Vendaval
- San Nicolás de Tonacatepeque
- 1981: Alianza (Reserve)
- 1982: Alianza
- El Roble de Ilobasco
- * Club domestic league appearances and goals as of 19 January 2007

Francisco Zamora Salinas (October 28, 1939 – April 8, 2002) was a famous footballer from El Salvador who played as a defender. He retired in 1973.

== Club career ==
Born in Honduras, Zamora began his footballing career at Heligueras in Honduras and later transferred to Guatemalan powerhouse Municipal before coming to El Salvador where he spent his life there even becoming a Salvadoran citizen.

He first played for Municipal de Sonsonate before transferring to Salvadoran giants Alianza where he spent sixteen years there as both player (1964–1973) and assistant coach/reserve player (1974–1979) after which he retired and became a coach. As a player, he won the 1966 and 1967 league titles in a team also featuring players like José Quintanilla and Roberto Rivas.

Zamora went on to coach Platense, C.D. Vendaval, El Roble, San Nicolás de Tonacatepeque and Alianza.

== International career ==
Nicknamed El Tigre, after becoming a Salvadoran citizen he went on to represent El Salvador.

== Death ==
Zamora died of Respiratory failure on April 8, 2002, aged 63. Zamora had four sons: Frank Zamora, Allan Zamora, Francisco Zamora Jr and Saúl Zamora and a daughter: Leslie Zamora.
