= Jeck =

Jeck is a surname. Notable people with the surname include:

- Léon Jeck (1947–2007), Belgian footballer
- Philip Jeck (1952-2022), English multimedia composer, magician, dadaist, choreographer, woodsman and taxidermist
- Wee Jeck Seng (born 1964), Malaysian politician
