= El Salvador at the CONCACAF Gold Cup =

The CONCACAF Gold Cup is North America's major tournament in senior men's football and determines the continental champion. Until 1989, the tournament was known as the CONCACAF Championship. It is currently held every two years. From 1996 to 2005, nations from other confederations have regularly joined the tournament as invitees. In earlier editions, the continental championship was held in different countries, but since the inception of the Gold Cup in 1991, the United States are constant hosts or co-hosts.

From 1973 to 1989, the tournament doubled as the confederation's World Cup qualification. CONCACAF's representative team at the FIFA Confederations Cup was decided by a play-off between the winners of the last two tournament editions in 2015 via the CONCACAF Cup, but was then discontinued along with the Confederations Cup.

Since 1963, the Gold Cup was held 27 times and has been won by seven different nations, most often by Mexico (12 titles).

El Salvador hosted the inaugural CONCACAF Championship in 1963. In the final round, they started with two victories, but lost the final and decisive match against Costa Rica 1–4. In that tournament, Salvadoran striker Volkswagen Hernández was top striker with five goals.

Since then, El Salvador have finished as runners-up again in 1981, and earned third place in 1977. After 20 total appearances, El Salvador ranks eighth in the tournament's all-time table.

== Overall record ==
CONCACAF Championship & Gold Cup record										Qualification record					
Year	Round	Position	Pld	W	D	L	GF	GA	Squad	Pld	W	D	L	GF	GA
(El Salvador) 1963	Runners-up	2nd	7	3	3	1	17	11	Squad	Qualified as hosts					
(Guatemala) 1965	Fourth place	4th	5	2	1	2	7	9	Squad	2	2	0	0	7	1
(Honduras) 1967	Did not enter									Did not enter					
(Costa Rica) 1969	Banned									Banned					
(Trinidad and Tobago) 1971	Withdrew									Withdrew					
(Haiti) 1973	Did not qualify									2	0	0	2	0	2
(Mexico) 1977	Third place	3rd	5	2	1	2	8	9	Squad	6	2	3	1	10	7
(Honduras) 1981	Runners-up	2nd	5	2	2	1	2	1	Squad	8	5	2	1	12	5
1985	Fourth place	4th	4	2	1	1	7	2	Squad	2	2	0	0	8	0
1989	Fifth place	5th	6	0	2	4	2	8	Squad	2	2	0	0	6	0
(United States) 1991	Did not qualify									5	2	1	2	7	11
(Mexico) (United States) 1993	Did not qualify									3	0	1	2	1	5
(United States) 1996	Group stage	6th	2	1	0	1	3	4	Squad	4	3	0	1	7	3
(United States) 1998	Group stage	8th	3	0	1	2	0	6	Squad	5	1	1	3	2	5
(United States) 2000	Did not qualify									8	1	2	5	6	15
(United States) 2002	Quarter-finals	8th	3	1	0	2	1	5	Squad	6	2	4	0	8	4
(Mexico) (United States) 2003	Quarter-finals	6th	3	1	0	2	3	7	Squad	5	3	0	2	6	4
(United States) 2005	Did not qualify									2	0	0	2	1	3
(United States) 2007	Group stage	9th	3	1	0	2	2	6	Squad	5	2	1	2	4	5
(United States) 2009	Group stage	9th	3	1	0	2	2	3	Squad	5	1	1	3	5	8
(United States) 2011	Quarter-finals	7th	4	1	2	1	8	8	Squad	5	2	1	2	7	6
(United States) 2013	Quarter-finals	7th	4	1	1	2	4	8	Squad	4	1	2	1	2	2
(Canada) (United States) 2015	Group stage	9th	3	0	2	1	1	2	Squad	4	2	0	2	4	3
(United States) 2017	Quarter-finals	8th	4	1	1	2	4	6	Squad	5	2	1	2	5	4
(Costa Rica) (Jamaica) (United States) 2019	Group stage	9th	3	1	1	1	1	4	Squad	4	3	0	1	7	2
(United States) 2021	Quarter-finals	6th	4	2	0	2	6	4	Squad	6	5	0	1	10	1
(Canada) (United States) 2023	Group stage	14th	3	0	2	1	3	4	Squad	4	1	2	1	6	5
(Canada) (United States) 2025	Group stage	15th	3	0	1	2	0	4	Squad	6	5	0	1	12	6
Total	Runners-up	20/28	77	22	21	34	81	111	—	108	49	22	37	143	107

== Match overview ==
Tournament	Round	Opponent	Score	Venue
(El Salvador) 1963	First round	Nicaragua	6–1	San Salvador
(El Salvador) 1963	First round	Panama	1–1	San Salvador
(El Salvador) 1963	First round	Honduras	2–2	San Salvador
(El Salvador) 1963	First round	Guatemala	1–1	San Salvador
(El Salvador) 1963	Final round	Costa Rica	1–4	San Salvador
(El Salvador) 1963	Final round	Honduras	3–0	San Salvador
(El Salvador) 1963	Final round	Netherlands Antilles	3–2	San Salvador
(Guatemala) 1965	Final round	Mexico	0–2	Guatemala City
(Guatemala) 1965	Final round	Netherlands Antilles	1–1	Guatemala City
(Guatemala) 1965	Final round	Guatemala	1–4	Guatemala City
(Guatemala) 1965	Final round	Costa Rica	2–1	Guatemala City
(Guatemala) 1965	Final round	Haiti	3–1	Guatemala City
(Mexico) 1977	Final round	Canada	2–1	Monterrey
(Mexico) 1977	Final round	Mexico	1–3	Mexico City
(Mexico) 1977	Final round	Haiti	0–1	Mexico City
(Mexico) 1977	Final round	Suriname	3–2	Monterrey
(Mexico) 1977	Final round	Guatemala	2–2	Mexico City
(Honduras) 1981	Final round	Canada	0–1	Tegucigalpa
(Honduras) 1981	Final round	Mexico	1–0	Tegucigalpa
(Honduras) 1981	Final round	Cuba	0–0	Tegucigalpa
(Honduras) 1981	Final round	Honduras	0–0	Tegucigalpa
(Honduras) 1981	Final round	Haiti	1–0	Tegucigalpa
1985	Group stage	Suriname	3–0	San Salvador, El Salvador
1985	Group stage	Suriname	3–0	San Salvador, El Salvador
1985	Group stage	Honduras	1–2	San Salvador, El Salvador
1985	Group stage	Honduras	0–0	Tegucigalpa, Honduras
1989	Final round	Costa Rica	2–4	San Salvador, El Salvador
1989	Final round	Costa Rica	0–1	San José, Costa Rica
1989	Final round	Trinidad and Tobago	0–2	Port-of-Spain, Trinidad and Tobago
1989	Final round	Trinidad and Tobago	0–0	Tegucigalpa, Honduras
1989	Final round	United States	0–1	Tegucigalpa, Honduras
1989	Final round	United States	0–0	Fenton, United States
(United States) 1996	Group stage	Trinidad and Tobago	3–2	Anaheim
(United States) 1996	Group stage	United States	0–2	Anaheim
(United States) 1998	Group stage	Guatemala	0–0	Los Angeles
(United States) 1998	Group stage	Brazil	0–4	Los Angeles
(United States) 1998	Group stage	Jamaica	0–2	Los Angeles
(United States) 2002	Group stage	Mexico	0–1	Pasadena
(United States) 2002	Group stage	Guatemala	1–0	Pasadena
(United States) 2002	Quarter-finals	United States	0–4	Pasadena
(Mexico) (United States) 2003	Group stage	United States	0–2	Foxboro
(Mexico) (United States) 2003	Group stage	Martinique	1–0	Foxboro
(Mexico) (United States) 2003	Quarter-finals	Costa Rica	2–5	Foxboro
(United States) 2007	Group stage	Trinidad and Tobago	2–1	Carson
(United States) 2007	Group stage	Guatemala	0–1	Carson
(United States) 2007	Group stage	United States	0–4	Foxboro
(United States) 2009	Group stage	Costa Rica	2–1	Carson
(United States) 2009	Group stage	Canada	0–1	Columbus
(United States) 2009	Group stage	Jamaica	0–1	Miami
(United States) 2011	Group stage	Mexico	0–5	Arlington
(United States) 2011	Group stage	Costa Rica	1–1	Charlotte
(United States) 2011	Group stage	Cuba	6–1	Chicago
(United States) 2011	Quarter-finals	Panama	1–1 (2–4 p)	Washington, D.C.
(United States) 2013	Group stage	Trinidad and Tobago	2–2	Harrison
(United States) 2013	Group stage	Honduras	0–1	Miami Gardens
(United States) 2013	Group stage	Haiti	1–0	Houston
(United States) 2013	Quarter-finals	United States	1–5	Baltimore
(Canada) (United States) 2015	Group stage	Canada	0–0	Carson
(Canada) (United States) 2015	Group stage	Costa Rica	1–1	Houston
(Canada) (United States) 2015	Group stage	Jamaica	0–1	Toronto
(United States) 2017	Group stage	Mexico	1–3	San Diego
(United States) 2017	Group stage	Curaçao	2–0	Denver
(United States) 2017	Group stage	Jamaica	1–1	San Antonio
(United States) 2017	Quarter-finals	United States	0–2	Philadelphia
(United States) (Costa Rica) (Jamaica) 2019	Group stage	Curaçao	1–0	Kingston
(United States) (Costa Rica) (Jamaica) 2019	Group stage	Jamaica	0–0	Houston
(United States) (Costa Rica) (Jamaica) 2019	Group stage	Honduras	0–4	Los Angeles
(United States) 2021	Group stage	Guatemala	2–0	Frisco
(United States) 2021	Group stage	Trinidad and Tobago	2–0	Frisco
(United States) 2021	Group stage	Mexico	0–1	Dallas
(United States) 2021	Quarter-finals	Qatar	2–3	Glendale
(Canada) (United States) 2023	Group stage	Martinique	1–2	Fort Lauderdale
(Canada) (United States) 2023	Group stage	Costa Rica	0–0	Harrison
(Canada) (United States) 2023	Group stage	Panama	2–2	Houston
(Canada) (United States) 2025	Group stage	Curaçao	0–0	San Jose
(Canada) (United States) 2025	Group stage	Honduras	0–2	Houston
(Canada) (United States) 2025	Group stage	Canada	0–2	Houston

== Record by opponent ==
CONCACAF Championship/Gold Cup matches (by team)
Opponent	W	D	L	Pld	GF	GA
Brazil	0	0	1	1	0	4
Canada	1	1	2	4	2	3
Costa Rica	2	3	4	9	11	18
Cuba	1	1	0	2	6	1
Guatemala	2	3	2	7	7	8
Haiti	3	0	1	4	5	2
Honduras	1	3	4	8	6	11
Jamaica	0	2	3	5	1	5
Martinique	1	0	1	2	2	2
Mexico	1	0	6	7	3	15
Netherlands Antilles / Curaçao	3	2	0	5	7	3
Nicaragua	1	0	0	1	6	1
Panama	0	3	0	3	4	4
Qatar	0	0	1	1	2	3
Suriname	3	0	0	3	9	2
Trinidad and Tobago	3	2	1	6	9	7
United States	0	1	7	8	1	20

== See also ==
- El Salvador at the FIFA World Cup
