= Juan Ignacio Basaguren =

Mexican footballer (born 1944)

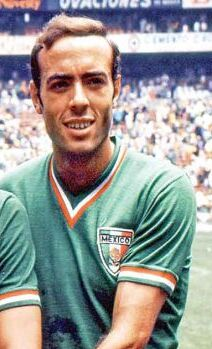

Personal information
- Full name: Juan Ignacio Basaguren García
- Date of birth: 21 July 1944 (age 82)
- Place of birth: Mexico City, Mexico
- Position: Midfielder

International career
Years	Team	Apps	(Gls)
1968–1970	Mexico	9	(3)

Juan Ignacio Basaguren García (born 21 July 1944) is a Mexican former professional footballer who played as a midfielder.

== Career ==
Basaguren played for Atlante F.C. during the 1970 71 Primera season.

Basaguren competed for Mexico at the 1968 Summer Olympics and at the 1970 FIFA World Cup. In 1970, he became the first ever substitute player to score in a World Cup match, against El Salvador.

=== International goals ===
Scores and results list Mexico's goal tally first.

No	Date	Venue	Opponent	Score	Result	Competition
1.	18 February 1970	Estadio León, León, Mexico	Bulgaria	2–0	2–0	Friendly
2.	5 March 1970	Estadio Nacional de Lima, Lima, Peru	Peru	1–0	1–0	Friendly
3.	7 June 1970	Estadio Azteca, Mexico City, Mexico	El Salvador	4–0	4–0	1970 FIFA World Cup
