= Dagoberto Fontes =

Uruguayan footballer (1943–2024)

Personal information
- Full name: Dagoberto Fontes Figueredo
- Date of birth: 6 June 1943
- Place of birth: Maldonado, Uruguay
- Date of death: 4 May 2024 (aged 80)
- Place of death: Maldonado, Uruguay
- Height: 1.77 m (5 ft 10 in)
- Positions: Forward; midfielder

Senior career*
Years	Team	Apps	(Gls)
1960	Central Molino		
1961–1962	Atlético Fernandino		
1964	Nacional		
1965–1971	Defensor Sporting		
- Puebla
- Tigres UANL

International career
1968–1970	Uruguay	13	(0)
- * Club domestic league appearances and goals

Dagoberto Fontes Figueredo (6 June 1943 – 4 May 2024) was an Uruguayan footballer who played as a forward or midfielder, notably for Defensor Sporting. He represented the Uruguay national team at the 1970 FIFA World Cup. Fontes died on 4 May 2024, at the age of 80.
