= Mauricio Manzano =

Salvadoran footballer (born 1943)

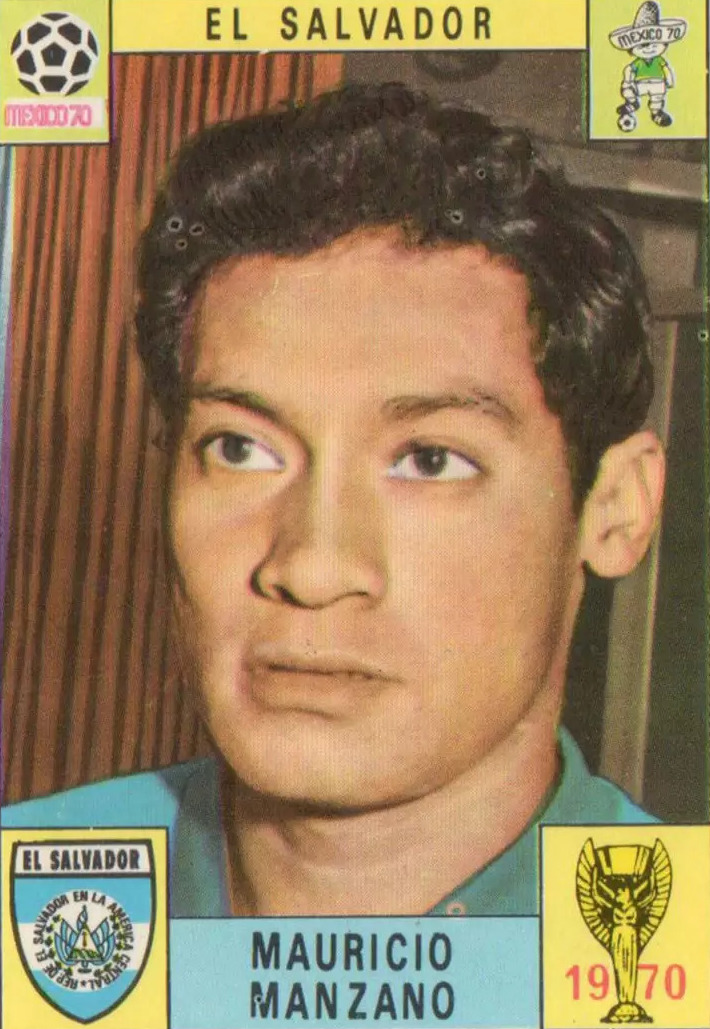
- Manzano in 1970

Personal information
- Full name: José Mauricio Manzano López
- Date of birth: September 30, 1943 (age 83)
- Place of birth: San Salvador, El Salvador
- Position: Defender

Senior career*
| Years | Team | Apps | (Gls) |
- Atlético Marte
| 1963–1968 | UES | | |
| 1969–1971 | FAS | | |
| 1972 | UES | | |

International career
| | El Salvador | 32 | (0) |
- * Club domestic league appearances and goals as of 2008

José Mauricio Manzano López (born 30 September 1943 in San Salvador) is a retired football player from El Salvador who represented his country at the 1970 FIFA World Cup in Mexico.

== International career ==
Manzano has represented his country in youth team selections and the senior team in 5 FIFA World Cup qualification matches as well as in one game at the 1970 FIFA World Cup Finals. He was injured in the first half of that latter match against Belgium, missing the other group games as a consequence.

== Retirement ==
After retiring as a player, Manzano left the capital for the countryside to work as an agricultural engineer for the Ministry of Agriculture. On his return to San Salvador, he picked up football again as a coach.

== Honours ==
- Salvadoran Cup: 1

1970
