= Alberto Gómez (Uruguayan footballer) =

Uruguayan footballer (1944–2020)

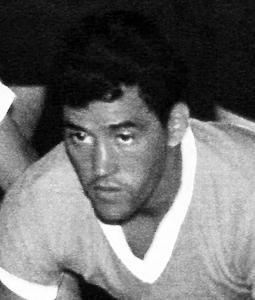
- Gómez in 1970

Personal information
- Full name: Alberto Gómez
- Date of birth: 10 June 1944
- Place of birth: Uruguay
- Date of death: 17 September 2020 (aged 76)
- Height: 1.68 m (5 ft 6 in)
- Position: Forward

Senior career*
Years	Team	Apps	(Gls)
1966–1967	Liverpool Montevideo		
1969–1971	Liverpool Montevideo		
1972–1974	C.F. Torreón		(11)
1974–1975	Leones Negros		(6)
1975–1976	C.D. Oro	24	(0)
1976–1977	San Luis F.C.	38	(4)

International career^{‡}
1970	Uruguay		
- * Club domestic league appearances and goals as of April 26, 2009 ‡ National team caps and goals as of April 26, 2009

Alberto Gómez (10 June 1944 – 17 September 2020) was an Uruguayan football player. He played for Uruguay football team in the 1970 World Cup, where he came on as a substitute against the then USSR.

Gómez died in September 2020, at the age of 76.
