= Roberto Rivas (footballer) =

Salvadoran footballer (1941-1972)

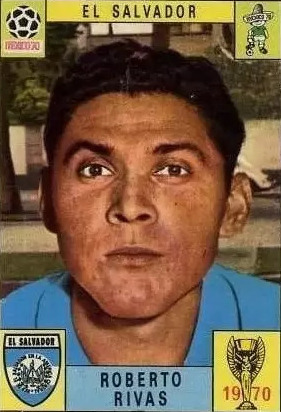
- Rivas in 1970

Personal information
- Full name: Roberto Rivas González
- Date of birth: July 17, 1941
- Place of birth: Soyapango, El Salvador
- Date of death: 5 February 1972 (aged 30)
- Position: Right back

Senior career*
Years	Team	Apps	(Gls)
1960–1970	Alianza		

International career
1967–1970	El Salvador	30	(0)
- * Club domestic league appearances and goals

Roberto Rivas González (17 July 1941 – 5 February 1972) was a football player from El Salvador who played as a defender.

== Club career ==
Nicknamed La Burra (The Donkey), Rivas was a one-club man and has only played for Alianza during the 1960s and won two league titles in 1965 and 1966 when he played alongside fellow club legends like José Quintanilla, Mario Monge and Francisco Zamora.

== International career ==
Rivas has represented his country in 10 FIFA World Cup qualification matches and played at the 1968 Olympic Games and at the 1970 FIFA World Cup in Mexico.

== Death ==
Rivas died in a suicide in 1972. By June 2010, Rivas was one of six 1968 Olympic footballers of El Salvador who had already died. Alianza retired the number 2 shirt in honour of Rivas.
