= Gustavo Peña =

Mexican footballer and manager (1942–2021)

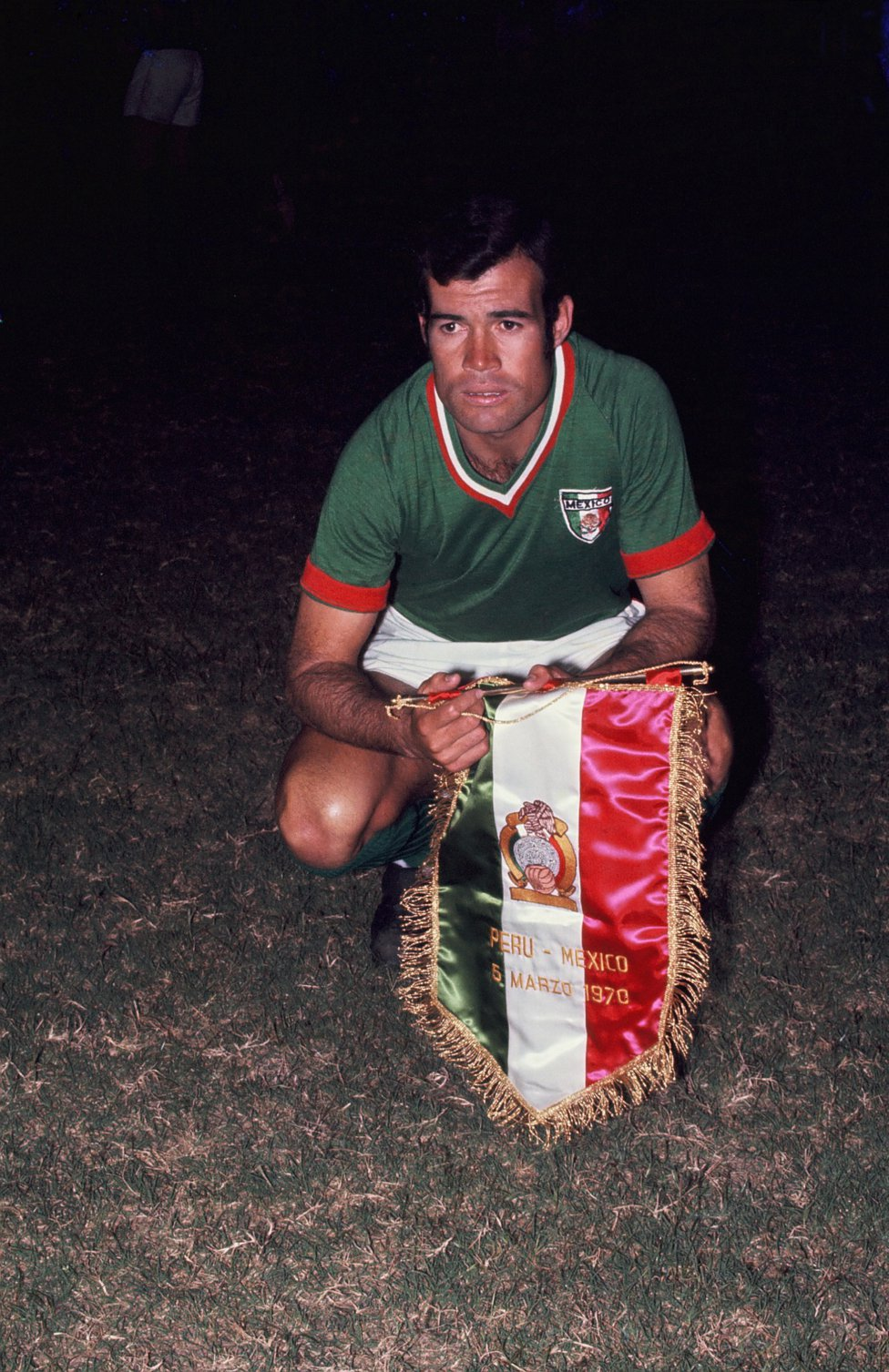
- Peña in 1970

Personal information
- Full name: Gustavo Peña Velasco
- Date of birth: 22 November 1942
- Place of birth: Talpa de Allende, Jalisco, Mexico
- Date of death: 19 January 2021 (aged 78)
- Place of death: Mexico City, Mexico
- Height: 1.84 m (6 ft 0 in)
- Position: Defender

Senior career*
Years	Team	Apps	(Gls)
1960–1967	Oro Guadalajara		
1967–1970	Cruz Azul		
1970–1973	Jalisco		
1973–1976	Monterrey		
1976–1977	Laguna	3	(0)

International career
1961–1974	Mexico	82	(3)

Managerial career
- 1977–1978: Tampico Madero
- 1978–1979: Leones Negros
- 1979: Monterrey
- 1979: Mexico
- 1980–1983: Tampico Madero
- * Club domestic league appearances and goals

Gustavo Peña Velasco (22 November 1942 – 19 January 2021) was a Mexican professional footballer and manager.

== Life ==
Born in Talpa de Allende, Peña moved to Guadalajara, Jalisco, Mexico, with his parents when he was young.

Gustavo Peña died of COVID-19 in Mexico City on 19 January 2021, at age 78, during the COVID-19 pandemic in Mexico.

== Career ==
He began playing football with local side CD Oro. He played for nearly twenty years in the Primera División with Oro, Cruz Azul, Monterrey and Club de Fútbol Laguna.

He earned 82 caps and scored 3 goals for the Selección de fútbol de México (Mexico national team) from 1961 to 1974, and captained the team in FIFA World Cup (1966 and 1970) tournaments.

=== International goals ===
Scores and results list Mexico's goal tally first.

No	Date	Venue	Opponent	Score	Result	Competition
1.	22 June 1966	Windsor Park, Belfast, Northern Ireland	Northern Ireland	1–?	1–4	Friendly
2.	20 October 1968	Estadio Nacional de Lima, Lima, Peru	Peru	2–3	3–3	Friendly
3.	11 June 1970	Estadio Azteca, Mexico City, Mexico	Belgium	1–0	1–0	1970 FIFA World Cup

== Honours ==
=== Player ===
Individual

- RSSSF CONCACAF Championship Team of The Tournament: 1965, 1967
- CONCACAF Team of the Century: 1998

=== Manager ===
Leones Negros

- CONCACAF Champions' Cup: 1978
