= Saturnino Osorio =

Salvadoran footballer (1945–1980)

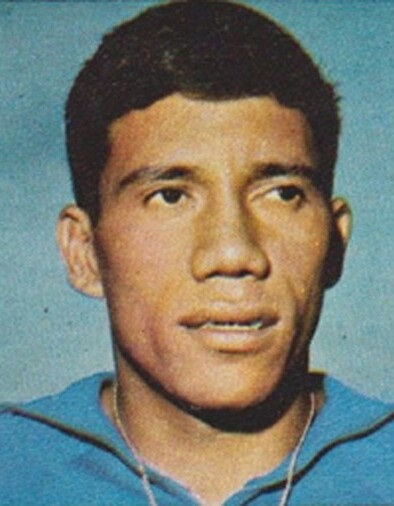
- Osorio in 1970

Personal information
- Full name: Saturnino Baltazar Osorio Zapata
- Date of birth: January 6, 1945
- Place of birth: El Salvador
- Date of death: 1980
- Position: Right back

Youth career
- 1964–1965: C.D. Águila (B)

Senior career*
Years	Team	Apps	(Gls)
1965–1970	C.D. Águila		
1970–1974	Alianza		
1974–1975	Platense		
1975–1976	C.D. Águila		
1976–1980	Alianza		

International career
1968–1970	El Salvador		
- * Club domestic league appearances and goals

Saturnino Baltazar Osorio Zapata (6 January 1945 – 1980) was a footballer from El Salvador.

== Club career ==
Ninón, as Osorio was called, played for Águila, Platense and Alianza. He was killed in Ciudad de Mejicanos, San Salvador by a Salvadorean army check point.

== International career ==
Osorio represented his country in 3 FIFA World Cup qualification matches and at the 1970 FIFA World Cup in Mexico.
