= Salvador Flamenco =

Salvadoran footballer (born 1947)

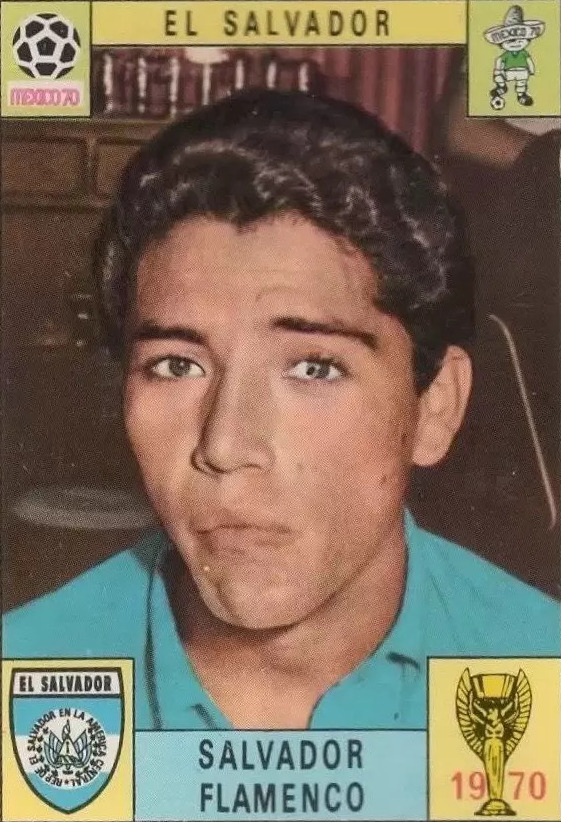
- Flamenco in 1970

Personal information
- Full name: Salvador Flamenco Cabezas
- Date of birth: 28 February 1947 (age 79)
- Place of birth: San Salvador, El Salvador
- Position: Striker

Youth career
- 1959–1962: Quequeisque

Senior career*
Years	Team	Apps	(Gls)
1963	Quequeisque		
1964–1971	Adler San Nicolas		
1971–1972	FAS		
1973	Platense		
1974	Firpo		
1975–1976	Dragon		

International career
1968–1971	El Salvador	26	(0)
- * Club domestic league appearances and goals as of 2009

Salvador Flamenco Cabezas (born 28 February 1947) is a retired footballer from El Salvador.

== Career ==
=== Professional ===
Flamenco began his career playing for Quequeisque's youth system, being considered a promising young defender. He played in Primera and Segunda division for Quequeisque. Flamenco was soon signed to a long term professional contract by Adler in 1964. This would hinder as Adler refused to play abroad despite interest from Club America, Toluca and a few clubs from Argentina. Flamenco was eventually able to move to FAS in 1971 and he stayed there until 1973 when he moved to Platense under the tutelage of Jorge Tupinambá. He stayed there until Tupinambá was released, then followed Tupinambá to Firpo and Dragon. He retired from football in 1976.

== International career ==
Flamenco represented his country at the 1968 Summer Olympics and at the 1970 FIFA World Cup in Mexico.

== Personal life ==
Flamenco's brother Oscar also was a professional footballer who played for ADLER.
