= Anzor Kavazashvili =

Soviet footballer from Georgia

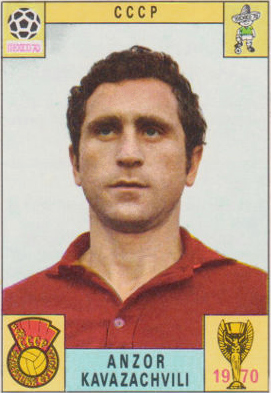

Personal information
- Full name: Anzor Amberkovich Kavazashvili
- Date of birth: 19 July 1940 (age 86)
- Place of birth: Batumi, Adjar ASSR, Georgian SSR, Soviet Union
- Height: 1.76 m (5 ft 9 in)
- Position: Goalkeeper

Senior career*
| Years | Team | Apps | (Gls) |
| 1957–1959 | FC Dinamo Tbilisi | 5 | (0) |
| 1960 | Zenit Leningrad | 30 | (0) |
| 1960–1968 | FC Torpedo Moscow | 165 | (0) |
| 1969–1971 | FC Spartak Moscow | 74 | (0) |
| 1972 | FC Torpedo Kutaisi | 31 | (0) |
| Total | | 305 | (0) |

International career
| 1965–1970 | USSR | 29 | (0) |

Managerial career
- 1973: FC Spartak Kostroma
- 1976–1977: Chad
- 1978: RSFSR U-19
- 1981–1983: RSFSR U-19
- 1985–1986: Guinea
- * Club domestic league appearances and goals

Anzor Amberkovich Kavazashvili (Georgian: ანზორ ყავაზაშვილი, Russian: Анзор Амберкович Кавазашвили, born 19 July 1940) is a Soviet former football goalkeeper of Georgian nationality.

== International career ==
He played for Soviet Union national team (29 matches), and was a participant at the 1966 FIFA World Cup and 1970 FIFA World Cup. After ending his playing career, he worked as a coach of several teams, including Spartak Kostroma and national teams of Chad and Guinea.

== Honours ==
FC Torpedo Moscow

- Soviet Top League champion: 1965
- Soviet Cup winner: 1968

FC Spartak Moscow

- Soviet Top League champion: 1969
- Soviet Cup winner: 1971

Individual

- Soviet Goalkeeper of the Year: 1965, 1967
