= José Vantolrá =

Mexican footballer (born 1943)

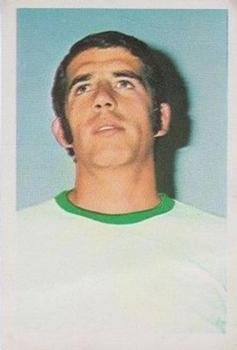
- Vantolrá in 1970

Personal information
- Full name: José Raymundo Ventolrá Rangel
- Date of birth: 30 March 1943 (age 83)
- Place of birth: Mexico City, Mexico
- Position: Defender

Senior career*
Years	Team	Apps	(Gls)
- Toluca

International career
1963–1970	Mexico	30	(0)

Managerial career
- 1992–1993: Toluca
- 1996: Santos Laguna
- * Club domestic league appearances and goals

José Raymundo Ventolrá Rangel (born 30 March 1943) is a Mexican former footballer, who played for the Mexico national team as a defender.

== Career ==
Vantolrá played club football for Toluca FC

He was part of the Mexico squad for the 1970 World Cup where he played in four matches. He is the son of the Spanish footballer Martí Ventolrá.
