= José Luis González Dávila =

Mexican footballer

José Luis González
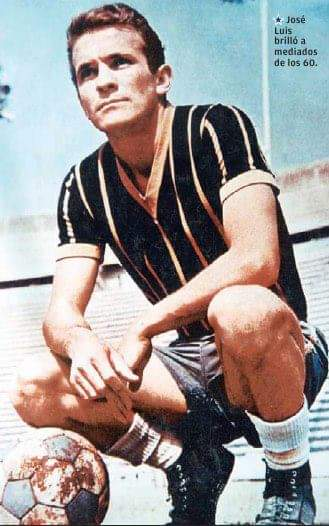
- González Dávila playing for UNAM

Personal information
- Full name: José Luis González Dávila
- Date of birth: 14 September 1945
- Place of birth: Mexico City, Mexico
- Date of death: 8 September 1995 (aged 49)
- Place of death: Mexico City, Mexico
- Height: 1.74 m (5 ft 8 1/2 in)
- Position: Forward

Senior career*
| Years | Team | Apps | (Gls) |
| 1962–1971 | UNAM | | |
| 1971–1974 | Deportivo Toluca | | |

International career
| 1964–1970 | Mexico | 41 | (4) |
- * Club domestic league appearances and goals

José Luis González "La Calaca" Dávila (September 14, 1942 – September 8, 1995) was a Mexican professional footballer who played as a forward and was a two time Olympian.

== Career ==
At club level, Gonzalez captained Pumas and Deportivo Toluca. He played for Mexico between 1964 and 1970, gaining 41 caps and scoring 4 goals. He was part of the Mexico squad for the Olympic competition in 1964 and the 1966 FIFA World Cup and 1970 FIFA World Cup.

=== International goals ===
Scores and results list Mexico's goal tally first.

| No | Date | Venue | Opponent | Score | Result | Competition |
|---|---|---|---|---|---|---|
| 1. | 4 March 1965 | Estadio Olímpico Universitario, Mexico City, Mexico | Honduras | 1–0 | 3–0 | 1966 FIFA World Cup qualification |
| 2. | 7 March 1965 | Los Angeles Memorial Coliseum, Los Angeles, United States | United States | 1–0 | 2–2 | 1966 FIFA World Cup qualification |
| 3. | 1 January 1969 | Estadio Azteca, Mexico City, Mexico | Italy | 2–2 | 2–3 | Friendly |
| 4. | 14 June 1970 | Estadio Luis Dosal, Toluca, Mexico | Italy | 1–0 | 1–4 | 1970 FIFA World Cup |

== Personal ==
González's brother, Víctor Manuel, is a former president of the FMF.
