= Nikolay Kiselyov (footballer) =

Russian footballer

Personal information
- Full name: Nikolay Ivanovich Kiselyov
- Date of birth: 29 November 1946 (age 79)
- Place of birth: Kineshma, Russian SFSR, USSR
- Height: 1.74 m (5 ft 9 in)
- Position: Midfielder

Senior career*
Years	Team	Apps	(Gls)
1964–1966	Khimik Severodonetsk	52	(7)
1967	Zorya Luhansk	17	(1)
1968–1973	Spartak Moscow	131	(16)
1974	Iskra Smolensk		
1975–1976	Spartak Moscow	0	(0)

International career
1969–1971	USSR	14	(0)

Managerial career
- 1984: Gomselmash Gomel
- 1984–1985: Metallurg Lipetsk
- 1985–1986: Dinamo Samarqand
- 1989–1993: Al Jazira (technical director)
- 1993–1994: Al-Ansar
- 1994–1995: Al Jazira (assistant)
- 1996–1997: Sokol-PZhD Saratov
- 1998: Oryol
- 1999–2000: Spartak-d Moscow
- 2001–2002: Oryol
- 2004–2005: Saturn Ramenskoye (reserves)
- 2006: Banants
- 2007–2008: Saturn Yegoryevsk
- 2008–2010: Rusichi Oryol
- * Club domestic league appearances and goals

Nikolay Ivanovich Kiselyov (Russian: Николай Иванович Киселёв; born 29 November 1946) is a former Russian footballer and coach.

== Career ==
Born in Kineshma Kiselyov began playing youth football with local side FC Tomna. He played in 148 Soviet league matches during a career as a midfielder with FC Khimik Severodonetsk, FC Zorya Luhansk, FC Spartak Moscow and FC Iskra Smolensk. Kiselyov won the 1969 Soviet Top League with Spartak and was awarded Master of Sport of the USSR and Merited Coach of Russia.

He capped 14 times for USSR, playing the 1970 FIFA World Cup.
