= Léon Jeck =

Belgian footballer (1947–2007)

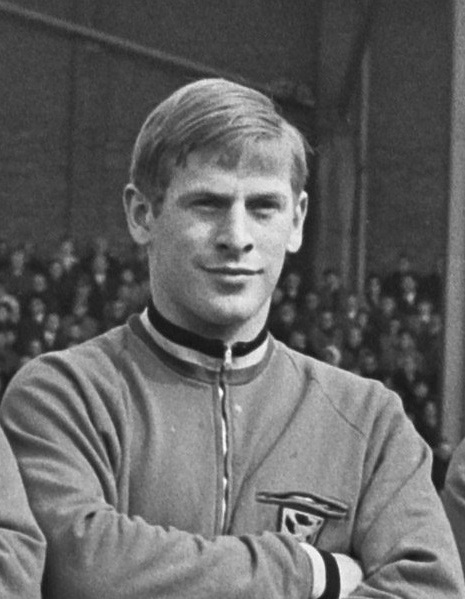
- Jeck in 1968

Personal information
- Date of birth: 8 February 1947
- Place of birth: Ans, Belgium
- Date of death: 24 June 2007 (aged 60)
- Place of death: Seraing, Belgium
- Position: Centre-back

Senior career*
Years	Team	Apps	(Gls)
1964–1974	Standard Liège		
1974–1975	Union St. Gilloise		
1975–1977	US Tellinoise		
- * Club domestic league appearances and goals

Léon Jeck (8 February 1947 – 24 June 2007) was a Belgian footballer. He was a tough-tackling centre-back for Standard Liège and played for the Belgium national team against Russia and Mexico in the 1970 FIFA World Cup group stage. It was Jeck's tackle that was controversially given as a penalty in the Mexico game that helped the hosts, not Belgium, progress to the next stage. He died on 23 June 2007 at the age of 60 from a pulmonary embolism.
