= Kakhi Asatiani =

Georgian footballer and manager

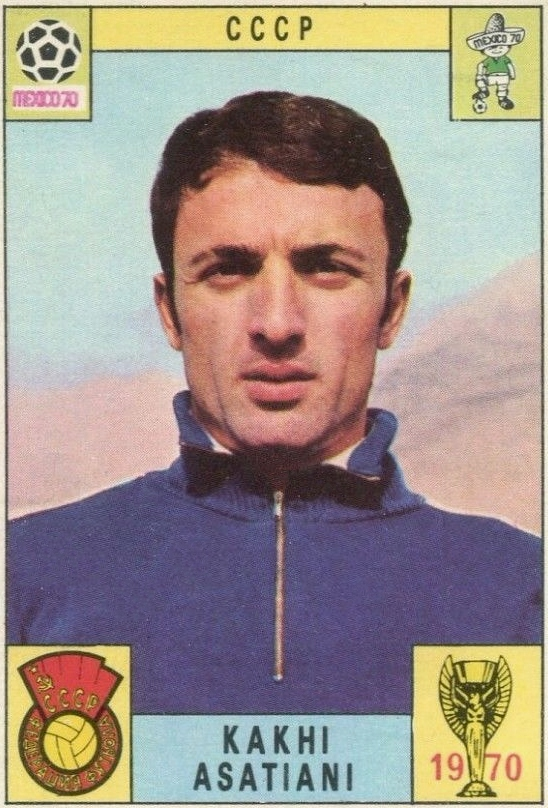
- Asatiani in 1970

Personal information
- Full name: Kakhi Shalvovych Asatiani
- Date of birth: 1 January 1947
- Place of birth: Telavi, Soviet Union
- Date of death: 20 November 2002 (aged 55)
- Place of death: Tbilisi, Georgia
- Position: Midfielder

Senior career*
Years	Team	Apps	(Gls)
1965–1975	Dinamo Tbilisi	218	(27)

International career
1968–1972	USSR	16	(5)

Managerial career
- 1978–1982: FC Dinamo Tbilisi (director)
- 1987: FC Dinamo Tbilisi
- * Club domestic league appearances and goals

Kakhi Asatiani (Georgian: კახი ასათიანი, 1 January 1947 – 20 November 2002) was a Georgian association football player and manager.

== Career ==
During his career, he played for FC Dinamo Tbilisi (1965–1975). Asatiani earned 16 caps for the USSR national football team, and participated in UEFA Euro 1968 and the 1970 FIFA World Cup. At the 1970 World Cup, he was recognized as the most graceful player of the championship. He coached FC Dinamo Tbilisi between 1978 and 1982, and became the team's manager in 1987. In the 1990s, he briefly served as the chairman of the Georgian Sport Department. Subsequently, he was involved in private business and became a Vice-President of the Airzena airline.

== Death ==
He was shot to death by unknown assailants in his own car on Barnovi street, near his home, in Tbilisi on 20 November 2002.
