= Salvador Mariona =

Salvadoran footballer (born 1943)

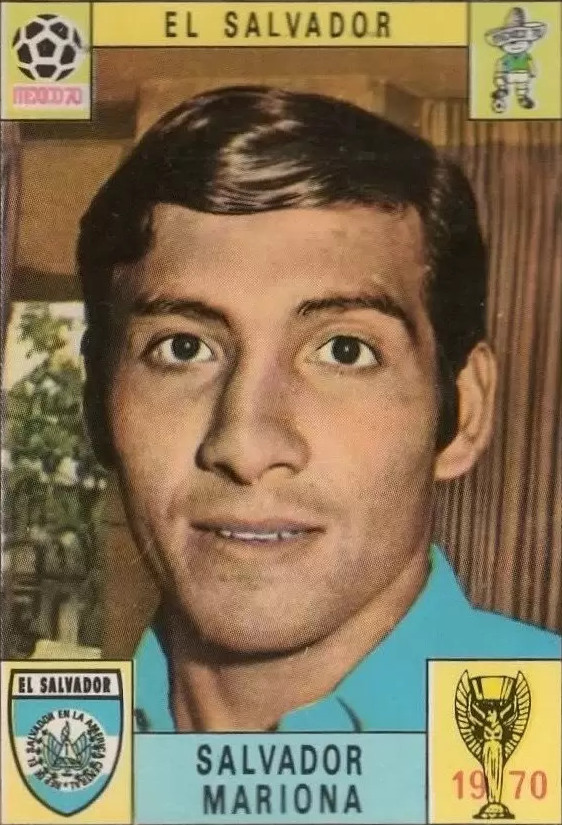
- Mariona in 1970

Personal information
- Full name: Salvador Antonio Mariona Rivera
- Date of birth: 27 December 1943 (age 82)
- Place of birth: Santa Tecla, El Salvador
- Position: Defender

Senior career*
Years	Team	Apps	(Gls)
1962	Mario Calvo		
1963	Atlante		
1964–1977	Alianza		
1977–1978	Platense Zacatecoluca		

International career
1965–1975	El Salvador	17	(0)

Managerial career
- 1973: Alianza
- 1978: Platense Zacatecoluca
- 1979: Alianza
- 1982: El Salvador (assistant)
- * Club domestic league appearances and goals

Salvador Antonio Mariona Rivera (born 27 December 1943) is a Salvadoran former footballer who played as a defender. At international level, he represented his country at the 1970 FIFA World Cup in Mexico.

== Club career ==
Born in Santa Tecla, Mariona moved with his parents to Izalco while still a boy and started a youth swimming career there, in the end winning a silver medal in a 4x100 m relief competition in Puerto Rico. He then began his footballing career at Mario Calvo in the third division and moved up to the Primera División de Fútbol de El Salvador when he joined Atlante.

But he spent the major part of his career at Salvadoran giants Alianza and also played for Platense Zacatecoluca, after which he retired in 1977 and became a coach.

== International career ==
Nicknamed Chamba, he was selected to represent El Salvador for ten years and featured in qualifying and playing in the 1970 World Cup.

== Retirement ==
After football, Salvador Mariona worked as an insurance salesman and gained enough experience to found Desarrollo, SA which quickly became AIG Unión y Desarrollo, SA. Mariona was the Chief Executive of his beloved Alianza after taking over in 2005.

== Personal life ==
Mariona is married to Floridalma Palacios and the couple have 5 children, one of them being the father of fellow footballer Javier Mariona, who has also represented El Salvador internationally.
