= Jorge Vásquez (Salvadoran footballer) =

Salvadoran footballer (born 1945)

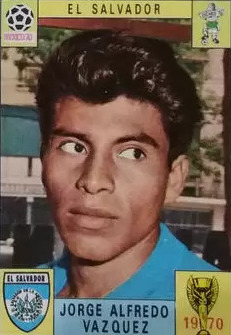
- Vásquez in 1970

Personal information
- Full name: Jorge Alfredo Vásquez
- Date of birth: 23 April 1945 (age 81)
- Place of birth: El Salvador
- Position: Midfielder

Senior career*
Years	Team	Apps	(Gls)
1962–1972	UES		
1973	C.D. Municipal Limeno		
1975	ANTEL		
1974–1979	Platense		

International career
1967–1972	El Salvador	32	(0)
- * Club domestic league appearances and goals as of 2009

Jorge Alfredo Vásquez (born 23 April 1945) is a retired football player from El Salvador who represented his country at the 1968 Summer Olympics and at the 1970 FIFA World Cup in Mexico.

== Club career ==
Vásquez played for Salvadoran clubs UES and Platense.

== International career ==
Nicknamed el Indio, Vásquez has represented his country in 10 FIFA World Cup qualification matches and played at the 1970 FIFA World Cup.
