= Ernesto Aparicio =

Salvadoran footballer (born 1948)

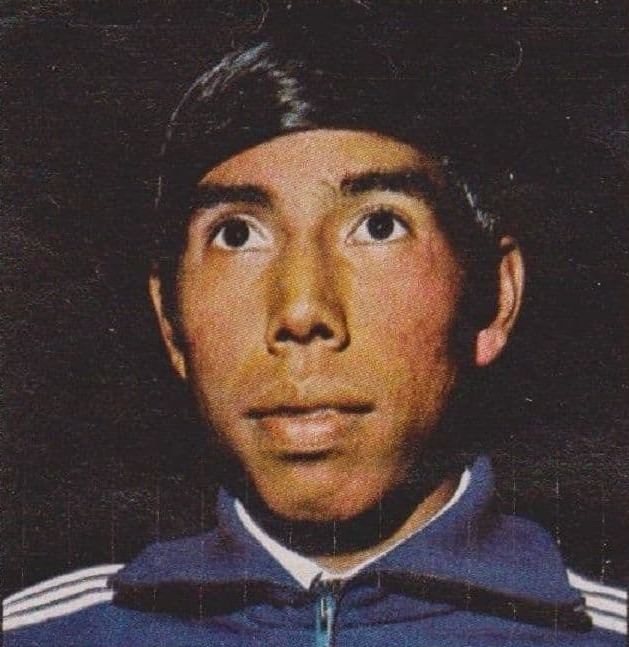
- Aparicio in 1970

Personal information
- Full name: Ernesto Hugo Aparicio
- Date of birth: 28 December 1948 (age 77)
- Place of birth: El Salvador
- Position: Striker

Senior career*
Years	Team	Apps	(Gls)
1967–1975	Atlético Marte		
1974	Cincinnati Comets		
1975	Chicago Cats		

International career
1972–1974	El Salvador	9	(0)
- * Club domestic league appearances and goals as of 2009

Ernesto Hugo Aparicio (born 28 December 1948) is a former footballer from El Salvador who represented his country at the 1970 FIFA World Cup in Mexico.

he ended up playing in ASL for Cincinnati Comets and Chicago Cats

== Honours ==
- Primera División de Fútbol de El Salvador: 1

1970
