= Mario Velarde (footballer, born 1940) =

Mexican footballer

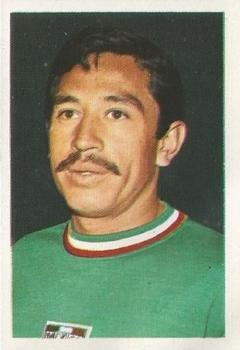
- Velarde in 1970

Personal information
- Full name: Mario Velarde Velázquez
- Date of birth: 29 March 1940
- Place of birth: San Ángel, Mexico City, Mexico
- Date of death: 19 September 1997 (aged 57)
- Height: 1.70 m (5 ft 7 in)
- Position: Midfielder

Senior career*
Years	Team	Apps	(Gls)
1960–1965	Necaxa		
1965–1974	Pumas		

International career
1962–1972	Mexico	15	(3)

Managerial career
- 1983: Mexico Youth
- 1983–1987: Pumas
- 1987–1989: Mexico
- 1988–1990: Cruz Azul
- 1991–1992: Toluca
- * Club domestic league appearances and goals

Mario Velarde Velázquez (29 March 1940 – 19 September 1997) was a Mexican football midfielder, who played for the Selección de fútbol de México (Mexico national team) between 1962 and 1972. He was part of the Mexico squad for the FIFA World Cup tournaments (1962 and 1970).

== Career ==
Born in San Ángel, Velarde played football for Necaxa and Pumas. He scored 64 league goals for Pumas. Velarde Coached the Mexican Youth Team in the 1983 FIFA World Youth Championship.
