= Valentin Afonin =

Soviet footballer (1939–2021)

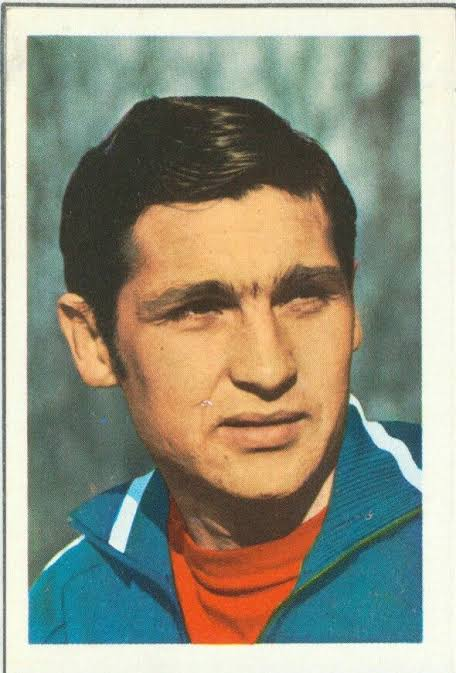
- Afonin in 1970

Personal information
- Full name: Valentin Ivanovich Afonin
- Date of birth: 22 December 1939
- Place of birth: Vladimir, Russian SFSR, Soviet Union
- Date of death: 2 April 2021 (aged 81)
- Place of death: Russia
- Position: Defender

Senior career*
Years	Team	Apps	(Gls)
1959	SKVO Rostov-on-Don	0	(0)
1960	Traktor Vladimir		
1961–1967	SKA Rostov-on-Don	147	(0)
1968–1970	CSKA Moscow	80	(1)
1971–1973	SKA Rostov-on-Don	31	(0)
Total		258	(1)

International career
1965–1970	USSR	42	(0)

Managerial career
- 1972: FC SKA Rostov-on-Don (assistant)
- 1982–1983: SKA Khabarovsk
- * Club domestic league appearances and goals

Valentin Ivanovich Afonin (Russian: Валентин Иванович Афонин; 22 December 1939 – 2 April 2021) was a Soviet footballer who played as a defender.

== International career ==
He played for Soviet Union national team (42 matches), and was a participant at the 1966 FIFA World Cup, 1970 FIFA World Cup and at the 1968 UEFA European Football Championship.

== Honours ==
- Soviet Top League: 1970
- Soviet Top League runner-up: 1966
- Top 33 players year-end list: 1968, 1969, 1970
