= Javier Valdivia =

Mexican footballer (born 1941)

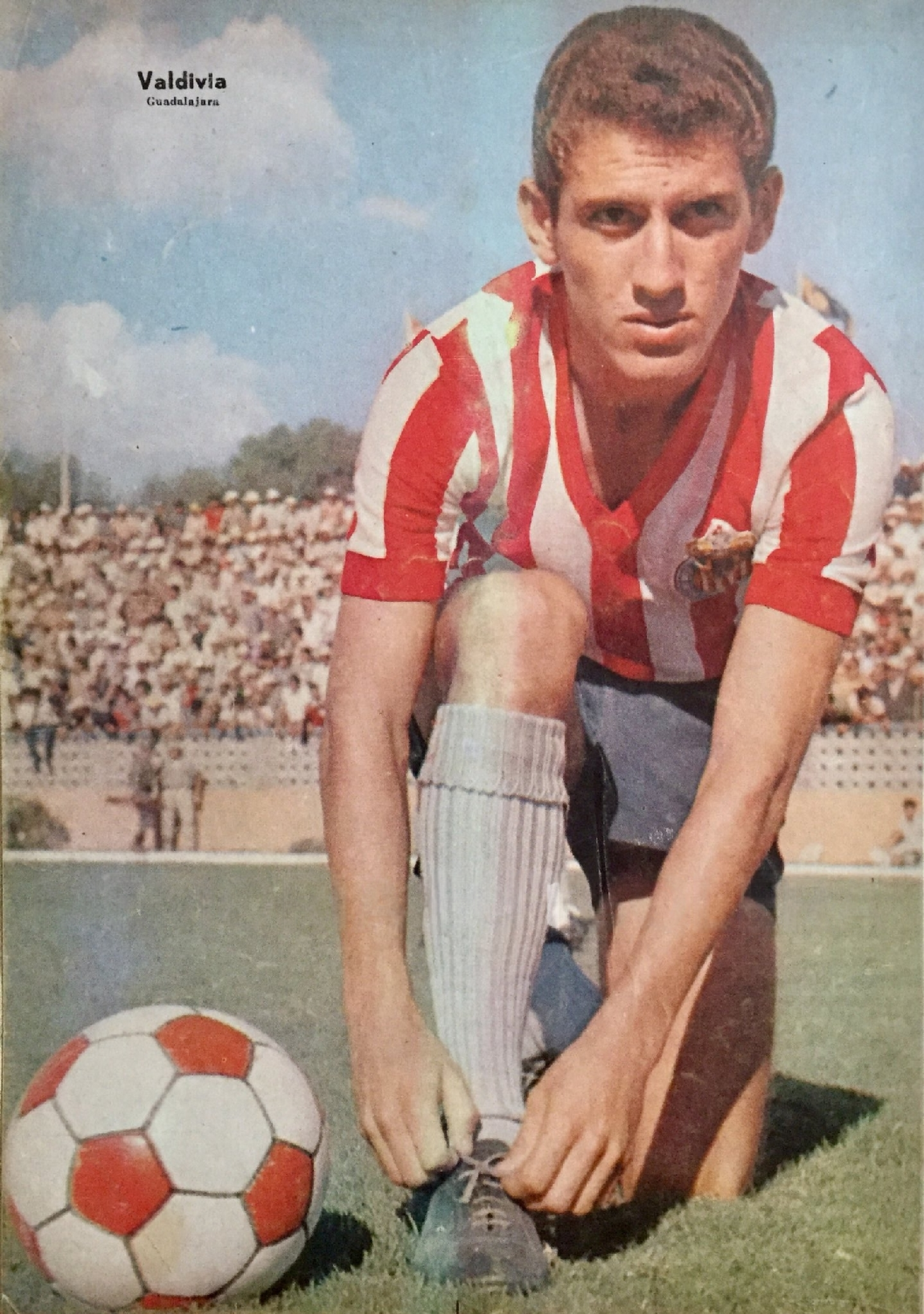

Personal information
- Full name: Javier Valdivia Huerta
- Date of birth: 4 December 1941 (age 84)
- Place of birth: Guadalajara, Jalisco, Mexico
- Position: Forward

Senior career*
Years	Team	Apps	(Gls)
1960–1971	Guadalajara	?	(69)
1971–1972	Club Jalisco		

International career
1965–1971	Mexico	24	(5)
- * Club domestic league appearances and goals

Javier Valdivia Huerta (born 4 December 1941) is a Mexican former professional footballer who played as a forward for C.D. Guadalajara, Club Jalisco on a club level and Mexico internationally.

== Career ==
Valdivia began playing football with local side Guadalajara in 1960. He made his debut with the Mexico national team in 1965.

He scored 2 goals in the 1970 FIFA World Cup, making him one of six Chivas players to score two goals at a World Cup final.

== Career statistics ==
=== International goals ===
Scores and results list Mexico's goal tally first.

No	Date	Venue	Opponent	Score	Result	Competition
1.	28 March 1965	Estadio Mateo Flores, Guatemala City, Guatemala	El Salvador	2–0	2–0	1965 CONCACAF Championship
2.	18 March 1970	Estadio León, León, Mexico	Peru	1–1	3–3	Friendly
3.	7 June 1970	Estadio Azteca, Mexico City, Mexico	El Salvador	1–0	4–0	1970 FIFA World Cup
4.	7 June 1970	Estadio Azteca, Mexico City, Mexico	El Salvador	2–0	4–0	1970 FIFA World Cup
5.	1 December 1970	Estadio Azteca, Mexico City, Mexico	Australia	1–0	3–0	Friendly
