= Antonio Munguía =

Mexican footballer (1942-2018)

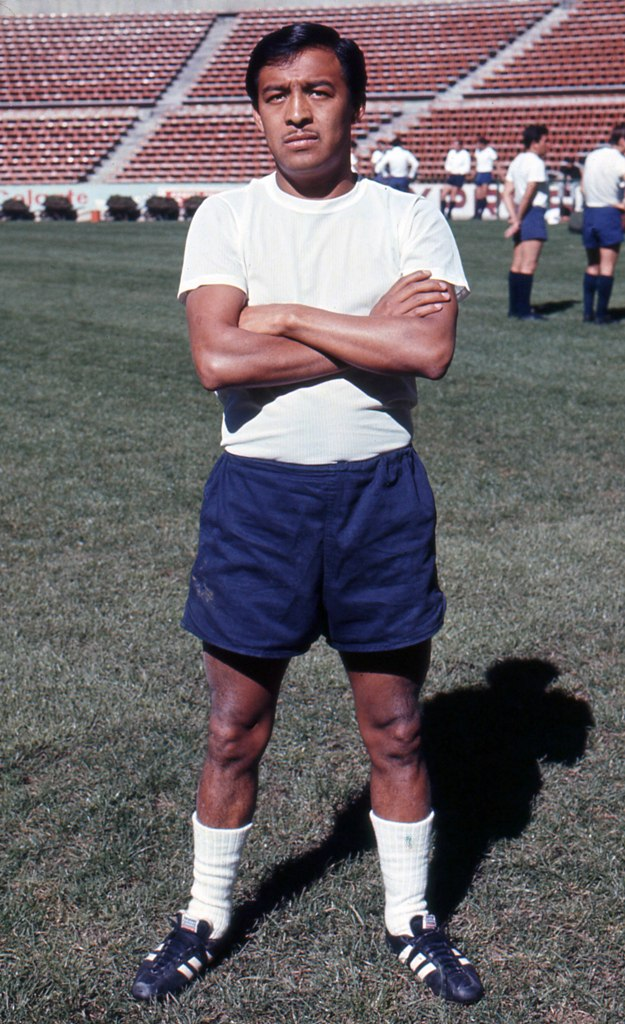
- Munguía playing for Cruz Azul

Personal information
- Full name: Antonio Munguía Flores
- Date of birth: June 27, 1942
- Place of birth: Mexico City, Mexico
- Date of death: January 8, 2018 (aged 75)
- Position: Midfielder

Senior career*
Years	Team	Apps	(Gls)
1962–1966	Necaxa		
1966–1972	Cruz Azul		

International career
1965–1971	Mexico	44	(0)
- * Club domestic league appearances and goals

Antonio Munguía Flores (June 27, 1942 – January 8, 2018) was a Mexican football midfielder, who played for the Mexico national team between 1967 and 1971, gaining 44 caps. He was part of the Mexico squad for the 1970 World Cup.
