= José Quintanilla (footballer) =

Salvadoran footballer (1947–1977)

Antonio Quintanilla
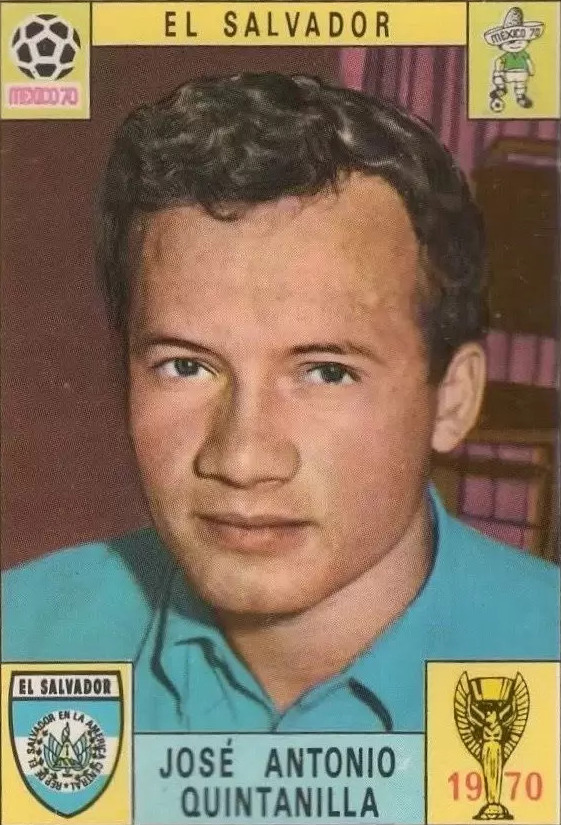
- Quintanilla in 1970

Personal information
- Full name: José Antonio Quintanilla Escobar
- Date of birth: 29 October 1947
- Place of birth: Sonsonate, Sonsonate Department, El Salvador
- Date of death: 1977 (aged 29-30)
- Place of death: Ahuachapán, Ahuachapán Department, El Salvador
- Position: Midfielder

Senior career*
Years	Team	Apps	(Gls)
1965–1967	Alianza		
1970–1971	Atlético Marte		
1974	Alianza		
1976–1977	Once Municipal		

International career
1968–1970	El Salvador	24	(1)
- * Club domestic league appearances and goals

José Antonio Quintanilla Escobar (29 October 1947 – 1977) was a former footballer from El Salvador who played as a midfielder.

== Club career ==
Quintanilla was a member of the 1966 and 1967 league championship winning side of Alianza. He also played for Atlético Marte and Once Municipal. He died in a road accident when on his way for a training at Once Municipal.

== International career ==
Nicknamed el Ruso, Quintanilla represented El Salvador at the 1968 Summer Olympics, in 10 FIFA World Cup qualification matches and at the 1970 FIFA World Cup in Mexico. He earned 22 caps.
