= Héctor Pulido =

Mexican footballer (1942–2022)

Personal information
- Full name: Héctor Pulido Rodríguez
- Date of birth: 20 December 1942
- Place of birth: Numaran, Michoacán, Mexico
- Date of death: 18 February 2022 (aged 79)
- Height: 1.79 m (5 ft 10 in)
- Position: Midfielder

Senior career*
Years	Team	Apps	(Gls)
1963–1977	Cruz Azul		
1977–1979	Club Jalisco	53	(1)
1978	→ Los Angeles Aztecs (loan)	3	(0)

International career
1967–1973	Mexico	43	(6)

Managerial career
- 1986–1988: Cruz Azul
- 1988–1989: Correcaminos
- * Club domestic league appearances and goals

Héctor Pulido Rodríguez (20 December 1942 – 18 February 2022) was a Mexican football player and manager who played as a midfielder. He played for the Mexico national team between 1967 and 1973, gaining 43 caps and scoring six goals. He was part of the Mexico squad for the 1970 FIFA World Cup.

== Career ==
At club level, Pulido played for Cruz Azul and Club Jalisco.

After he retired from playing, Pulido became a manager of Cruz Azul in the 1986–87 Mexican Primera División season final against C.D. Guadalajara.

== Personal life and death ==
Pulido died on 18 February 2022, at the age of 79.

== Career statistics ==
Scores and results list Mexico's goal tally first, score column indicates score after each Pulido goal.

List of international goals scored by Héctor Pulido
No.	Date	Venue	Opponent	Score	Result	Competition
1	27 August 1968	Estadio Azteca, Mexico City, Mexico	Chile	2–1	3–1	Friendly
2	29 September 1968	Estadio León, León, Mexico	Ethiopia	2–0	3–0	Friendly
3	29 September 1968	Estadio León, León, Mexico	Ethiopia	3–0	3–0	Friendly
4	9 August 1972	Estadio Nacional de Lima, Lima, Peru	Peru	2–1	2–3	Friendly
5	20 September 1973	Estadio Azteca, Mexico City, Mexico	Chile	1–0	2–1	Friendly
6	8 December 1973	Stade Sylvio Cator, Port-au-Prince, Haiti	Netherlands Antilles	3–0	8–0	1973 CONCACAF Championship
