= Trinidad and Tobago national football team results (1960–1979) =

- Win Draw Loss

The Trinidad and Tobago national football team represents Trinidad and Tobago in association football and is controlled by the Trinidad and Tobago Football Association (TTFA), the governing body of the sport in the country.

The team's largest victory that came between 1960 and 1979 was when they defeated Antigua and Barbuda 11–1 on 10 November 1972. Their worst loss between 1960 and 1979 was by 5 goals on 3 occasions. A 1–6 defeat from Suriname on 14 March 1965, a 0-5 defeat from Costa Rica on 4 December 1969, and a 1–6 defeat from Haiti on 28 November 1971.

During this period, the Soca Warriors become members of CONCACAF in 1963 and FIFA in 1964, enabling them to become eligible for the CONCACAF Championship and the FIFA World Cup. They were able to qualify for the Championship on 4 occasions (1967, 1969, 1971, 1973). During the 1973 edition, which also served as the final stage in the 1974 FIFA World Cup qualification, Trinidad and Tobago briefly missed out on the 1974 FIFA World Cup in a controversial matter. In 1978, they became founding members of the Caribbean Football Union.

== Results ==
=== 1960 ===
18 September 1960 Friendly	Trinidad and Tobago	1–1	Martinique	Port of Spain, Trinidad and Tobago
	Niles (?)	Report	P. Jean-Baptiste (?)	Stadium: Queen's Park Oval

20 September 1960 Friendly	Trinidad and Tobago	1–1	Martinique	Port of Spain, Trinidad and Tobago
	Niles (?)	Report	Gonnier (?)
Note: 11v11.com displays the incorrect date and location.

22 September 1960 Friendly	Trinidad and Tobago	3–1	Martinique	Port of Spain, Trinidad and Tobago
	Gomet (?); Panton (?); A. Baptiste (?)	Report 1 Report 2	P. Jean-Baptiste (pen.)	Stadium: Queen's Park Savannah

24 September 1960 Friendly	Trinidad and Tobago	0–0	Martinique	Port of Spain, Trinidad and Tobago
		Report

=== 1962 ===
16 September 1962 Friendly	Trinidad and Tobago	1–1	Suriname	Trinidad and Tobago
	? (?)	Report	? (?)

18 September 1962 Friendly	Trinidad and Tobago	1–0	Suriname	Trinidad and Tobago
	Moore 44'	Report		Attendance: 3,272

20 September 1962 Friendly	Trinidad and Tobago	1–1	Suriname	Trinidad and Tobago
	? (?)	Report	? (?)

22 September 1962 Friendly	Trinidad and Tobago	1–1	Suriname	Trinidad and Tobago
	Gray 3'	Report

=== 1963 ===
31 March 1963 Friendly	Suriname	4–3	Trinidad and Tobago	Paramaribo, Suriname
	? (?)	Report	? (?)

2 April 1963 Friendly	Suriname	1–2	Trinidad and Tobago	Paramaribo, Suriname
	? (?)	Report	? (?)

4 April 1963 Friendly	Suriname	4–3	Trinidad and Tobago	Paramaribo, Suriname
	? (?)	Report	? (?)

=== 1964 ===
5 April 1964 Friendly	British Guiana	1–2	Trinidad and Tobago	Georgetown, British Guiana
	Layne (?)	Report	Aleong (?); Gray (?)	Stadium: Bourda

10 April 1964 Friendly	British Guiana	1–6	Trinidad and Tobago	Georgetown, British Guiana
	Britton (?)	Report	Aleong (?) (?) (?) (?); ? (?)	Stadium: Bourda

12 April 1964 Friendly	British Guiana	1–4	Trinidad and Tobago	Georgetown, British Guiana
	Richmond (?)	Report	Nieves (?) (?); Mendes (?); Gray (?)	Stadium: Bourda

14 April 1964 Friendly	British Guiana	1–1	Trinidad and Tobago	Georgetown, British Guiana
	Peters (?)	Report	Aleong (?)	Stadium: Bourda

18 April 1964 Friendly	British Guiana	1–2	Trinidad and Tobago	Georgetown, British Guiana
	? (?)	Report	? (?)	Stadium: Bourda; Referee: Stanley Moore

=== 1965 ===
7 February 1965 1966 FIFA World Cup qualification	Trinidad and Tobago	4–1	Suriname	Port of Spain, Trinidad and Tobago
	Gellineau 1'; Corneal 28'; Aleong 38', 46'	Report	Haltman 4'	Stadium: Queen's Park Oval; Attendance: 3,272; Referee: Theodorus Koetsier (Netherlands Antilles)

21 February 1965 1966 FIFA World Cup qualification	Costa Rica	4–0	Trinidad and Tobago	San José, Costa Rica
	Hernández 28' (pen.), 50'; Daniels 80'; Marín 84'	Report		Stadium: Estadio Nacional de Costa Rica; Attendance: 10,133; Referee: Rafael Valenzuela (Mexico)

22 February 1965 Friendly	Costa Rica	1–0	Trinidad and Tobago	San José, Costa Rica
	? (?)	Report		Attendance: 1,998

24 February 1965 Friendly	Netherlands Antilles	2–0	Trinidad and Tobago	Netherlands Antilles
	? (?)	Report

7 March 1965 1966 FIFA World Cup qualification	Trinidad and Tobago	0–1	Costa Rica	Port of Spain, Trinidad and Tobago
		Report	Hernández 29'	Stadium: Queen's Park Oval; Attendance: 3,293; Referee: Franz Figaroa (Netherlands Antilles)

14 March 1965 1966 FIFA World Cup qualification	Suriname	6–1	Trinidad and Tobago	Paramaribo, Suriname
	Haltman 9', 19'; Kluivert 30', 68'; Krenten 44'; Waterval 82'	Report	Sookram 20'	Stadium: National Stadion; Attendance: 3,417; Referee: Hector Osorio (Venezuela)

17 March 1965 Friendly	Trinidad and Tobago	2–1	British Guiana
	? (?)	Report	? (?)
Note: This match was played on neutral ground.

19 March 1965 Friendly	British Guiana	2–1	Trinidad and Tobago	British Guiana
	? (?)	Report	? (?)

5 August 1965 Friendly	Jamaica	4–0	Trinidad and Tobago	Kingston, Jamaica
	Dunkley 35', 36'; Welch 26'; Black 76'	Report		Stadium: National Stadium; Attendance: 8,000; Referee: Nell Dwyer (Jamaica)

=== 1966 ===
1966 Friendly	Trinidad and Tobago	2–0	Guyana
	? (?)	Report
Note: This match was played on neutral ground.

11 June 1966 1966 Coupe Duvalier	Trinidad and Tobago	3–2	Suriname	Port-au-Prince, Haiti
	Browne (?) (?); K. Joseph (?)	Report	Sahadewsing 15'; Haltman (<45)	Stadium: Stade Sylvio Cator; Attendance: 5,000

13 June 1966 1966 Coupe Duvalier	Trinidad and Tobago	1–0	Netherlands Antilles	Port-au-Prince, Haiti
	Corneal 3'	Report		Stadium: Stade Sylvio Cator

15 June 1966 1966 Coupe Duvalier	Trinidad and Tobago	4–1	Jamaica	Port-au-Prince, Haiti
	Cummings (?); Corneal (?); Browne (?); Sookram (?)	Report 1 Report 2	Miller (?)	Stadium: Stade Sylvio Cator

18 June 1966 1966 Coupe Duvalier	Haiti	1–0	Trinidad and Tobago	Port-au-Prince, Haiti
	G. Saint-Vil 85' (pen.)	Report		Stadium: Stade Sylvio Cator

20 June 1966 1966 Coupe Duvalier	Guadeloupe	2–1	Trinidad and Tobago	Port-au-Prince, Haiti
	? (?)	Report	Aleong 53'	Stadium: Stade Sylvio Cator

=== 1967 ===
13 January 1967 1967 CONCACAF Championship qualification	Trinidad and Tobago	2–1	Netherlands Antilles	Kingston, Jamaica
	Small 75'; Archibald 76'	Report	Pérez 87' (pen.)	Stadium: National Stadium

16 January 1967 1967 CONCACAF Championship qualification	Trinidad and Tobago	2–4	Haiti	Kingston, Jamaica
	Corneal 37' (pen.); Archibald 64'	Report	Pierre 2', 75'; St. Vil 52', 53'	Stadium: National Stadium; Referee: Ralph Bardowell (Jamaica)

18 January 1967 1967 CONCACAF Championship qualification	Jamaica	1–1	Trinidad and Tobago	Kingston, Jamaica
	As. Welch 85'	Report	Archibald 47'	Stadium: National Stadium; Attendance: 17,000

20 January 1967 1967 CONCACAF Championship qualification	Trinidad and Tobago	2–1	Cuba	Kingston, Jamaica
	Archibald 11'; DeLeon 15'	Report	Hernández 12'	Stadium: National Stadium; Referee: Guy Dumesle (Haiti)

5 March 1967 1967 CONCACAF Championship	Honduras	1–0	Trinidad and Tobago	Tegucigalpa, Honduras
	Cruz 35'	Report		Stadium: Chelato Uclés National Stadium; Referee: Walter van Rosberg (Netherlands Antilles)

8 March 1967 1967 CONCACAF Championship	Trinidad and Tobago	3–2	Haiti	Tegucigalpa, Honduras
	Corneal 18', 52' (pen.); Brown 4'	Report	St. Vil 33' (pen.); Pierre 56'	Stadium: Chelato Uclés National Stadium; Referee: Juan Dimas (Honduras)

12 March 1967 1967 CONCACAF Championship	Mexico	4–0	Trinidad and Tobago	Tegucigalpa, Honduras
	Estrada 22', 53'; Cerda Canela 40'; Bustos 83'	Report		Stadium: Chelato Uclés National Stadium; Referee: Carlos Ponzata (Guatemala)

14 March 1967 1967 CONCACAF Championship	Trinidad and Tobago	0–2	Guatemala	Tegucigalpa, Honduras
		Report	Roldán 35'; de León 79'	Stadium: Chelato Uclés National Stadium; Referee: Walter van Rosberg (Netherlands Antilles)

16 March 1967 1967 CONCACAF Championship	Trinidad and Tobago	3–1	Nicaragua	Tegucigalpa, Honduras
	Brown 30'; Berassa 86'; Gamaldo 88'	Report	Cuadra 82'	Stadium: Chelato Uclés National Stadium; Referee: José Isabel Morán (Panama)

29 September 1967 Friendly	Trinidad and Tobago	2–2	Martinique	Port of Spain, Trinidad and Tobago
	Cust (?); Browne (?)	Report	Délin (?); Cayol (?)

30 September 1967 Friendly	Trinidad and Tobago	3–2	Martinique	Port of Spain, Trinidad and Tobago
	Corneal (?) (?); Berassa (?)	Report	Cayol (?); A. Pierre-Louis (?)

27 November 1967 Diamond Jubilee	Trinidad and Tobago	1–0	Jamaica	San Fernando, Trinidad and Tobago
	Berassa 43'	Report		Stadium: Skinner Park

2 December 1967 Diamond Jubilee	Trinidad and Tobago	1–0	Jamaica	Port of Spain, Trinidad and Tobago
	? (?)	Report		Stadium: Queen's Park Oval

=== 1968 ===
17 November 1968 1970 FIFA World Cup qualification	Guatemala	4–0	Trinidad and Tobago	Guatemala City, Guatemala
	Stokes 30'; Murren 66' (o.g.); De la Bastide 78' (o.g.); Melgar 88'	Report		Stadium: Mateo Flores; Attendance: 26,845; Referee: Martin Araya Munoz (Costa Rica)

20 November 1968 1970 FIFA World Cup qualification	Trinidad and Tobago	0–0	Guatemala	Guatemala City, Guatemala
		Report		Stadium: Mateo Flores; Attendance: 16,215; Referee: Osorio Raul Castillo (Mexico)

23 November 1968 1970 FIFA World Cup qualification	Trinidad and Tobago	0–4	Haiti	Port-Au-Prince, Haiti
		Report	Saint-Vil 63', 84'; Barthelemy 37'; Obas 56'	Stadium: Stade Sylvio Cator; Attendance: 6,368; Referee: Alfonso Segura Gamboa (Costa Rica)

25 November 1968 1970 FIFA World Cup qualification	Haiti	2–4	Trinidad and Tobago	Port-Au-Prince, Haiti
	Guillaume 23'; Vorbe 52'	Report	Archibald 3', 73', 85'; Cummings 42'	Stadium: Stade Sylvio Cator; Attendance: 2,233; Referee: Alfonso González Archundia (Mexico)

=== 1969 ===
1969 1969 CONCACAF Championship qualification	Trinidad and Tobago	Cancelled	El Salvador	Trinidad and Tobago
		Report
Note: El Salvador were disqualified as a result of the Football War.

1969 1969 CONCACAF Championship qualification	El Salvador	Cancelled	Trinidad and Tobago	El Salvador
		Report
Note: El Salvador were disqualified as a result of the Football War.

27 November 1969 1969 CONCACAF Championship	Guatemala	2–0	Trinidad and Tobago	San José, Costa Rica
	Gamboa 8'; Fión 84'	Report		Stadium: Estadio Nacional; Referee: Diego De Leo (Italy/Mexico)

30 November 1969 1969 CONCACAF Championship	Trinidad and Tobago	3–2	Jamaica	San José, Costa Rica
	Cummings 33'; Douglas 40'; Haynes 49'	Report	Scott 20'; Hamilton 31'	Stadium: Estadio Nacional; Attendance: 20,462; Referee: Jorge Meléndez González (Guatemala)

2 December 1969 1969 CONCACAF Championship	Trinidad and Tobago	1–3	Netherlands Antilles	San José, Costa Rica
	Haynes 83'	Report	Loefstok 11', 49'; Martijn 65'	Stadium: Estadio Nacional; Referee: Luis Paulino Siles (Costa Rica)

4 December 1969 1969 CONCACAF Championship	Costa Rica	5–0	Trinidad and Tobago	San José, Costa Rica
	Ruiz 10', 55', 65', 70'; Elizondo 85' (pen.)	Report		Stadium: Estadio Nacional; Referee: Joseph Chaplin (Jamaica)

7 December 1969 1969 CONCACAF Championship	Mexico	0–0	Trinidad and Tobago	San José, Costa Rica
		Report		Stadium: Estadio Nacional; Referee: Theodorus Koetsier (Netherlands Antilles)

=== 1970 ===
4 October 1970 Friendly	Suriname	3–2	Trinidad and Tobago	Suriname
	? (?)	Report	Haynes (?); Brewster (?)

7 October 1970 Friendly	Trinidad and Tobago	1–1	Netherlands Antilles
	Roberts (?)	Report	? (?)
Note: This match was played on neutral ground.

8 October 1970 Friendly	Guyana	1–1	Trinidad and Tobago	Georgetown, Guyana
	Andrews 30'	Report	Renaud 15'	Stadium: Guyana Sports Club Ground; Referee: James Lugar (Guyana)

10 October 1970 Friendly	Guyana	1–1	Trinidad and Tobago	Georgetown, Guyana
	Britton 35'	Report	Renaud (?)	Stadium: Guyana Sports Club Ground; Referee: James Lugar (Guyana)

=== 1971 ===
13 November 1971 Friendly	Venezuela	1–0	Trinidad and Tobago	Caracas, Venezuela
	Ravelo 28'	Report		Stadium: Estadio Olímpico de la UCV; Attendance: 12,000
Note: This was Trinidad and Tobago's first match against a CONMEBOL nation.

21 November 1971 1971 CONCACAF Championship	Trinidad and Tobago	1–1	Honduras	San Fernando, Trinidad and Tobago
	Douglas 25'	Report	Matamoros 36' (pen.)	Stadium: Skinner Park; Referee: Juan Soto Paris (Costa Rica)

26 November 1971 1971 CONCACAF Championship	Mexico	2–0	Trinidad and Tobago	Port of Spain, Trinidad and Tobago
	Jiménez 46'; Rodríguez 85' (pen.)	Report		Stadium: Queen's Park Oval; Referee: Juan Dimas (Honduras)
Note: This match was originally scheduled for 25 November, but was postponed due to a storm.

28 November 1971 1971 CONCACAF Championship	Trinidad and Tobago	1–6	Haiti	Arima, Trinidad and Tobago
	Cave 7'	Report	Bayonne 40', 81'; Sanon 43'; Domingue 44'; Moraldo 51' (o.g.); Barthelemy 57'	Stadium: Arima Velodrome; Referee: José León (Honduras)

30 November 1971 1971 CONCACAF Championship	Trinidad and Tobago	2–2	Cuba	Port of Spain, Trinidad and Tobago
	Cave 16'; Lennard 70'	Report	Elejalde 77'; Lara 89'	Stadium: King George V Park; Referee: Jorge Narváez (Mexico)

5 December 1971 1971 CONCACAF Championship	Costa Rica	1–3	Trinidad and Tobago	Port of Spain, Trinidad and Tobago
	Valle 24'	Report	Philips 30'; David 58'; Douglas 69'	Stadium: Queen's Park Oval; Referee: Jorge Narváez (Mexico)

=== 1972 ===
30 September 1972 Friendly	Martinique	1–2	Trinidad and Tobago	Fort-de-France, Martinique
	Cayol (?)	Report	Archibald (?); Cummings	Attendance: 15,000

3 October 1972 Friendly	Martinique	1–2	Trinidad and Tobago	Fort-de-France, Martinique
	? (?)	Report	? (?)

11 October 1972 Friendly	Saint Christopher-Nevis-Anguilla	0–3	Trinidad and Tobago	Basseterre, Saint Christopher-Nevis-Anguilla
		Report	? (?)

10 November 1972 1973 CONCACAF Championship qualification	Trinidad and Tobago	11–1	Antigua and Barbuda	Port of Spain, Trinidad and Tobago
	Llewellyn 19', 38', 44'; David 42', 70', 79'; Spann 49', 68'; Roberts 83', 89'; Brewster 59'	Report	Morris 20'	Stadium: King George V Park; Attendance: 6,510; Referee: José Alvarez Alfaro (Nicaragua)

19 November 1972 1973 CONCACAF Championship qualification	Antigua and Barbuda	1–2	Trinidad and Tobago	St. John's, Antigua and Barbuda
	Edwards 80'	Report	Llewellyn 10'; David 30'	Stadium: Antigua Recreation Ground; Attendance: 2,750; Referee: Carlos Ortiz Pérez (Honduras)

28 November 1972 1973 CONCACAF Championship qualification	Trinidad and Tobago	2–1	Suriname	Port of Spain, Trinidad and Tobago
	Brewster 63'; Roberts 68'	Report	Zebeda 87' (pen.)	Stadium: Queen's Park Oval; Attendance: 7,964; Referee: Henry Landauer (United States)

30 November 1972 1973 CONCACAF Championship qualification	Trinidad and Tobago	1–1	Suriname	San Fernando, Trinidad and Tobago
	David 75'	Report	Zebeda 35'	Stadium: Skinner Park; Attendance: 9,276; Referee: Henry Landauer (United States)

=== 1973 ===
4 February 1973 Friendly	Trinidad and Tobago	0–0	Haiti	Trinidad and Tobago
		Report

6 February 1973 Friendly	Trinidad and Tobago	2–4	Haiti	Trinidad and Tobago
	? (?)	Report	? (?)

February 1973 Friendly	Suriname	0–0	Trinidad and Tobago	Paramaribo, Suriname
	? (?)	Report

February 1973 Friendly	Suriname	1–3	Trinidad and Tobago	Paramaribo, Suriname
	? (?)	Report	? (?)

October 1973 Friendly	Trinidad and Tobago	2–0	Martinique	Trinidad and Tobago
	? (?)	Report

29 November 1973 1973 CONCACAF Championship	Honduras	2–1	Trinidad and Tobago	Port-au-Prince, Haiti
	Guifarro 33'; Hernández 51'	Report	David 61'	Stadium: Stade Sylvio Cator; Attendance: 12,816; Referee: John Davis (Canada)

4 December 1973 1973 CONCACAF Championship	Haiti	2–1	Trinidad and Tobago	Port-au-Prince, Haiti
	Sanon 9'; R. Saint-Vil 88'	Report	David 15'	Stadium: Stade Sylvio Cator; Attendance: 12,816; Referee: José Roberto Henríquez (El Salvador)
Note: Four Trinidad and Tobago goals were disallowed by the referee and the linesman in a controversial fashion. As a result, referee Jose Roberto Henriquez and linesman James Higuet received lifetime bans from FIFA for their actions during the match.

10 December 1973 1973 CONCACAF Championship	Trinidad and Tobago	1–0	Guatemala	Port-au-Prince, Haiti
	David 30'	Report		Stadium: Stade Sylvio Cator; Attendance: 15,361; Referee: Julio César Soto Paris (Costa Rica)

14 December 1973 1973 CONCACAF Championship	Trinidad and Tobago	4–0	Mexico	Port-au-Prince, Haiti
	Cummings 11', 39'; Archibald 52'; David 62'	Report		Stadium: Stade Sylvio Cator; Attendance: 15,361; Referee: Werner John Winseman (Canada)

17 December 1973 1973 CONCACAF Championship	Trinidad and Tobago	4–0	Netherlands Antilles	Port-au-Prince, Haiti
	David 16', 33', 62'; Brunken 51' (o.g.)	Report		Stadium: Stade Sylvio Cator; Attendance: 17,358; Referee: Luis Villarejo (Puerto Rico)

=== 1974 ===
29 August 1974 USA Friendly Tournament	Jamaica	2–1	Trinidad and Tobago	New York, United States
	? (?)	Report	? (?)

23 November 1974 Friendly	Suriname	0–0	Trinidad and Tobago	Paramaribo, Suriname
		Report

25 November 1974 Friendly	Suriname	2–1	Trinidad and Tobago	Paramaribo, Suriname
	? (?)	Report	? (?)

22 December 1974 Friendly	Suriname	2–3	Trinidad and Tobago	Paramaribo, Suriname
	? (?)	Report	? (?)

=== 1975 ===
10 January 1975 Friendly	Suriname	3–0	Trinidad and Tobago	Paramaribo, Suriname
	? (?)	Report

29 March 1975 Friendly	Suriname	0–0	Trinidad and Tobago	Trinidad and Tobago
		Report

=== 1976 ===
15 August 1976 1977 CONCACAF Championship qualification	Barbados	2–1	Trinidad and Tobago	Bridgetown, Barbados
	Clark 37', 54' (pen.)	Report	David 83'	Stadium: Waterford National Stadium; Attendance: 5,000; Referee: Josephius Steeman (Suriname)

31 August 1976 1977 CONCACAF Championship qualification	Trinidad and Tobago	1–0	Barbados	Port of Spain, Trinidad and Tobago
	Douglas 35'	Report		Stadium: Queen's Park Oval; Attendance: 15,978; Referee: Theodorus Koetsier (Netherlands Antilles)

14 September 1976 1977 CONCACAF Championship qualification	Barbados	1–3	Trinidad and Tobago	Bridgetown, Barbados
	Clarke 26'	Report	Llewellyn 3'; Carpette 74'; Archibald 85'	Stadium: Waterford National Stadium; Attendance: 4,188; Referee: Ramón Calderón Castro (Cuba)

14 November 1976 1977 CONCACAF Championship qualification	Suriname	1–1	Trinidad and Tobago	Paramaribo, Suriname
	George 2'	Report	David 9'	Stadium: National Stadion; Attendance: 12,656; Referee: John Chandler (United States)

28 November 1976 1977 CONCACAF Championship qualification	Trinidad and Tobago	2–2	Suriname	Guatemala City, Guatemala
	Figaro 29'; Llewellyn 64' (pen.)	Report	Olmberg 44'; Entingh 83'	Stadium: Mateo Flores; Attendance: 26,845; Referee: Vicente Llobregat (Venezuela)

18 December 1976 1977 CONCACAF Championship qualification	Suriname	3–2 (a.e.t.)	Trinidad and Tobago	Cayenne, French Guiana
	George 60', 80'; Olmberg 107' (pen.)	Report	David 19', 70'	Stadium: Estadio National; Attendance: 23,331; Referee: Vicente Llobregat (Venezuela)
Note: This match was played on neutral ground.

=== 1977 ===
9 September 1977 Friendly	Trinidad and Tobago	0–0	Canada	Pointe-à-Pierre, Trinidad and Tobago
		Report		Stadium: Guaracara Park

11 September 1977 Friendly	Trinidad and Tobago	1–1	Canada	Pointe-à-Pierre, Trinidad and Tobago
	Harris (?)	Report	Roe (?)	Stadium: Guaracara Park

18 September 1977 Friendly	Suriname	2–1	Trinidad and Tobago	Suriname
	? (?)	Report	? (?)

22 September 1977 Friendly	Guyana	2–1	Trinidad and Tobago	Linden, Guyana
	? (o.g.); Barton (pen.)	Report	? (?)	Stadium: Mackenzie Sports Club Ground

24 September 1977 Friendly	Guyana	1–1	Trinidad and Tobago	Linden, Guyana
	Butts (?)	Report	? (pen.)	Stadium: Mackenzie Sports Club Ground

26 September 1977 Friendly	Guyana	0–2	Trinidad and Tobago	Linden, Guyana
		Report	Khan (?); Carpette (?)	Stadium: Mackenzie Sports Club Ground

=== 1978 ===
9 May 1978 Friendly	Trinidad and Tobago	5–1	Guyana	Port of Spain, Trinidad and Tobago
	? (?)	Report	? (?)

11 May 1978 Friendly	Trinidad and Tobago	4–0	Guyana	Port of Spain, Trinidad and Tobago
	? (?)	Report

30 July 1978 Friendly	Grenada	2–2	Trinidad and Tobago	St. George's, Grenada
	? (?)	Report	? (?)

20 August 1978 1978 CFU Championship qualification	Trinidad and Tobago	2–4	French Guiana	Port of Spain, Trinidad and Tobago
	Pierre 75' (pen.); Archibald 82'	Report	Epailly 22'; Joseph 25'; Tinel 51'; Sainte Luce 76'	Stadium: Queen's Park Oval

2 September 1978 1978 CFU Championship qualification	French Guiana	1–4 (a.e.t.)	Trinidad and Tobago	Cayenne, French Guiana
	? (?)	Report	Cave (?) (?); Spann (?); Barrington (?)	Stadium: Estadio National

23 October 1978 1978 CFU Championship	Trinidad and Tobago	3–1	Antigua and Barbuda	San Fernando, Trinidad and Tobago
	? (?)	Report	? (?)	Stadium: Skinner Park

25 October 1978 1978 CFU Championship	Suriname	1–0	Trinidad and Tobago	Port of Spain, Trinidad and Tobago
	? (?)	Report		Stadium: Queen's Park Oval

29 October 1978 1978 CFU Championship	Haiti	2–2	Trinidad and Tobago	Port of Spain, Trinidad and Tobago
	? (?)	Report	? (?)	Stadium: Queen's Park Oval

=== 1979 ===
24 May 1979 Friendly	Martinique	3–1	Trinidad and Tobago	Fort-de-France, Martinique
	Germany (pen.); Thorel (?); Theobald (?)	Report	? (?)

28 February 1979 Barbados Friendly Tournament	Martinique	0–0	Trinidad and Tobago	Bridgetown, Barbados
		Report

March 1979 Barbados Friendly Tournament	Barbados	2–2	Trinidad and Tobago	Bridgetown, Barbados
	? (?)	Report	? (?)

22 July 1979 1979 CFU Championship qualification	Grenada	0–1	Trinidad and Tobago	St. George's, Grenada
		Report	Murrell 49'	Stadium: Queen's Park National Stadium

5 August 1979 1979 CFU Championship qualification	Trinidad and Tobago	2–1	Grenada	Port of Spain, Trinidad and Tobago
	? (?)	Report	? (?)	Stadium: Queen's Park Oval

4 October 1979 1979 CFU Championship qualification	Trinidad and Tobago	2–0	French Guiana	Cayenne, French Guiana
	? (?)	Report		Stadium: Estadio National

6 October 1979 1979 CFU Championship qualification	French Guiana	0–0	Trinidad and Tobago	Cayenne, French Guiana
		Report		Stadium: Estadio National

11 November 1979 1979 CFU Championship	Haiti	1–0	Trinidad and Tobago	Paramaribo, Suriname
	Mathelier 87'	Report		Stadium: National Stadion; Attendance: 5,000

15 November 1979 1979 CFU Championship	Suriname	3–0	Trinidad and Tobago	Paramaribo, Suriname
	Rigters 15'; Nelom 30'; Stewart 75'	Report		Stadium: National Stadion

17 November 1979 1979 CFU Championship	Saint Vincent and the Grenadines	2–1	Trinidad and Tobago	Paramaribo, Suriname
	? (?)	Report	? (?)	Stadium: National Stadion

== Record by opponent ==
Team	Pld	W	D	L	GF	GA	GD	WPCT
Antigua and Barbuda	3	3	0	0	16	3	+13	100.00
Barbados	4	2	1	1	7	5	+2	50.00
Canada	2	0	2	0	0	0	0	0.00
Costa Rica	4	1	0	3	3	12	−9	25.00
Cuba	2	1	1	0	4	3	+1	50.00
French Guiana	2	1	0	1	6	5	+1	50.00
Grenada	3	2	1	0	4	2	+2	66.67
Guadeloupe	1	0	0	1	1	2	−1	0.00
Guatemala	5	1	1	3	1	8	−7	20.00
Guyana	15	8	6	1	38	16	+22	53.33
Haiti	11	2	2	7	15	28	−13	18.18
Honduras	3	0	1	2	2	4	−2	0.00
Jamaica	7	4	1	2	12	4	+8	57.14
Martinique	11	5	5	1	17	12	+5	45.45
Mexico	4	1	1	2	4	6	−2	25.00
Netherlands Antilles	6	3	1	2	9	7	+2	50.00
Nicaragua	1	0	0	1	3	1	+2	0.00
Saint Christopher-Nevis-Anguilla	1	1	0	0	3	0	+3	100.00
Saint Vincent and the Grenadines	1	0	0	1	1	2	−1	0.00
Suriname	24	6	8	10	36	46	−10	25.00
Venezuela	1	0	0	1	0	1	−1	0.00
Total	111	41	31	39	182	167	+15	36.94

Source: Results
