= 1967 CONCACAF Championship qualification =

Tournament details
- Dates: 11 January – 14 February 1967
- Teams: 8 (from 1 confederation)

Tournament statistics
- Matches played: 13
- Goals scored: 39 (3 per match)

The 1967 CONCACAF Championship qualification competition was the qualifying contest to decide the finalists for the 1967 CONCACAF Championship – the third international association football championship for members of the Confederation of North, Central America and Caribbean Association Football (CONCACAF). Qualifying ran from 11 January – 14 February 1967 and was contested by the national teams of eight CONCACAF member associations.

Honduras, the hosts of the championship, and Mexico, the defending champions, qualified automatically and did not take part in the qualification competition. The qualifying competition was split into two sections – a Caribbean section and a Central American section. The winners and runners up of both sections (Haiti, Trinidad and Tobago, Guatemala and Nicaragua) qualified for the final tournament.

== Background ==
The Confederation of North, Central America and Caribbean Association Football (CONCACAF) was founded as a merger of the Confederación Centroamericana y del Caribe de Fútbol (CCCF) and North American Football Confederation (NAFC) in 1961. The first CONCACAF Championship, in which all the competing nations qualified automatically, was held in 1963. A qualifying competition was introduced from the second edition in 1965.

== Format ==
Qualification for the 1967 CONCACAF Championship was split into a Caribbean section and a Central American section. In both sections, the competing teams would contest a single round-robin at a centralised venue where each team would play all of the others once. The winner and runner-up would qualify for the final tournament.

=== Participants ===
Caribbean section:

- Cuba
- Haiti
- Jamaica
- Netherlands Antilles
- Trinidad and Tobago

Central American section:

- Costa Rica
- El Salvador
- Guatemala
- Nicaragua
- Panama

== Venue ==
All matches in the Caribbean section were held at the National Stadium in Kingston, Jamaica and all matches in the Central American section were held at the Estadio Mateo Flores in Guatemala City, Guatemala.

Kingston	Guatemala City
National Stadium	Estadio Mateo Flores
Capacity: 35,000	Capacity: 26,000
National Stadium	Estadio Mateo Flores
1967 CONCACAF Championship qualification is located in Jamaica	1967 CONCACAF Championship qualification is located in Guatemala

== Caribbean section ==
The Caribbean section was sponsored by Desnoes & Geddes, the brewery of Red Stripe beer, and doubled as the Red Stripe Caribbean Trophy.

The group began on 11 January when Jamaica drew 1–1 with the Netherlands Antilles. The following day, Cuba and Haiti also drew 1–1. On 13 January, Trinidad and Tobago defeated the Netherlands Antilles 2–1 before Jamaica defeated Cuba by the same score line the following day. On 16 January, Haiti defeated Trinidad and Tobago. As a result, Haiti and Jamaica were tied at the top with three points at the halfway stage, one point ahead of Trinidad and Tobago.

On 17 January, Cuba and the Netherlands Antilles drew 2–2 and, the following day, Jamaica drew 1–1 with Trinidad and Tobago. On 19 January, Haiti defeated the Netherlands Antilles 1–0 which left Haiti one point clear of Jamaica with the two due to play in their last match and two points ahead of Trinidad and Tobago. On January 20, in their last match, Trinidad and Tobago defeated Cuba 2–1 which put them in a position to qualify. The following day, Haiti defeated Jamaica 1–0 to win the group and qualify alongside Trinidad and Tobago.

=== Table ===
Pos	Team	Pld	W	D	L	GF	GA	GD	Pts	Qualification
1	Haiti	4	3	1	0	7	3	+4	7	Qualification for 1967 CONCACAF Championship
2	Trinidad and Tobago	4	2	1	1	7	7	0	5	Qualification for 1967 CONCACAF Championship
3	Jamaica	4	1	2	1	4	4	0	4	
4	Cuba	4	0	2	2	5	7	−2	2	
5	Netherlands Antilles	4	0	2	2	4	6	−2	2	

=== Results ===
11 January 1967

Jamaica	1–1	Netherlands Antilles
Oxford 14'		Dirksz 55'

National Stadium, Kingston
12 January 1967

Cuba	1–1	Haiti
Verdecia 30'		Saint-Vil 40' (pen.)

National Stadium, Kingston

13 January 1967

Trinidad and Tobago	2–1	Netherlands Antilles
Small 75'; Archibald 76'		Perez 87' (pen.)

National Stadium, Kingston
14 January 1967

Jamaica	2–1	Cuba
Ar. Welch 20', 32'		Dos Santos 76'

National Stadium, Kingston

16 January 1967

Haiti	4–2	Trinidad and Tobago
Pierre 2', 75'; Saint-Vil 52', 53'		Corneal 37' (pen.); Archibald 65'

National Stadium, Kingston
17 January 1967

Netherlands Antilles	2–2	Cuba
Dirksz 4'; Perez 72'		Hernández 44'; Micó 75'

National Stadium, Kingston

18 January 1967

Jamaica	1–1	Trinidad and Tobago
As. Welch 85'		Archibald 49'

National Stadium, Kingston
19 January 1967

Haiti	1–0	Netherlands Antilles
Métellus 87'

National Stadium, Kingston

20 January 1967

Trinidad and Tobago	2–1	Cuba
Archibald 11'; DeLeon 15'		Hernández 13'

National Stadium, Kingston
21 January 1967

Jamaica	0–1	Haiti
		Saint-Vil 88'

National Stadium, Kingston

=== Team of the Tournament ===
An ideal XI for the Caribbean qualifying group was selected by The Gleaner.

Goalkeeper	Defenders	Midfielders	Forwards
(Netherlands Antilles) Juby Richardson	(Haiti) Wilfrid Soray (Netherlands Antilles) Juan Pablo (Jamaica) Frank Brown	(Trinidad and Tobago) Sedley Joseph (Netherlands Antilles) Edwin Dirksz (Haiti) Joseph Obas	(Jamaica) Art Welch (Cuba) José Verdecia (Haiti) Guy Saint-Vil (Trinidad and Tobago) Warren Archibald

== Central American section ==
Before the tournament begun, El Salvador and Costa Rica withdrew following a disagreement with the Federación Nacional de Fútbol de Guatemala, the organiser of the tournament, surrounding discrepancies in the money to be distributed between competitors. CONCACAF subsequently fined the Federación Costarricense de Fútbol and the Federación Salvadoreña de Fútbol and sanctioned them with a one-year suspension.

The section began on 9 February when Nicaragua defeated Panama 3–1. Three days later, Guatemala defeated Panama by the same score line which meant both Guatemala and Nicaragua had qualified for the final tournament. In the final match on 14 February, Guatemala defeated Nicaragua 3–1 to win the group.

=== Table ===
Pos	Team	Pld	W	D	L	GF	GA	GD	Pts	Qualification
1	Guatemala	2	2	0	0	6	2	+4	4	Qualification for 1967 CONCACAF Championship
2	Nicaragua	2	1	0	1	4	4	0	2	Qualification for 1967 CONCACAF Championship
3	Panama	2	0	0	2	2	6	−4	0	

=== Results ===
9 February 1967

Nicaragua	3–1	Panama
Barrios 10'; Cuadra 71', 81'		Romero 80'

Estadio Mateo Flores, Guatemala City

12 February 1967

Guatemala	3–1	Panama
E.De León 2'; R.De León 5'; Roldán 85'		Romero 7'

Estadio Mateo Flores, Guatemala City

14 February 1967

Guatemala	3–1	Nicaragua
Mendoza 24' (o.g.); Peña 27', 42'		Ochoa 44' (o.g.)

Estadio Mateo Flores, Guatemala City
