= Bermuda at the CONCACAF Gold Cup =

North America's major tournament in senior men's soccer

The CONCACAF Gold Cup is North America's major tournament in senior men's soccer and determines the continental champion. Until 1989, the tournament was known as CONCACAF Championship. It is currently held every two years. From 1996 to 2005, nations from other confederations have regularly joined the tournament as invitees. In earlier editions, the continental championship was held in different countries, but since the inception of the Gold Cup in 1991, the United States are constant hosts or co-hosts.

From 1973 to 1989, the tournament doubled as the confederation's World Cup qualification. CONCACAF's representative team at the FIFA Confederations Cup was decided by a play-off between the winners of the last two tournament editions in 2015 via the CONCACAF Cup, but was then discontinued along with the Confederations Cup.

Bermuda scored their first tournament goal against Haiti in their first match of the 2019 CONCACAF Gold Cup.

In 2021, Bermuda played against Barbados and Haiti in the 2021 Gold Cup qualifiers.

== Record at the CONCACAF Championship/Gold Cup ==
CONCACAF Championship & Gold Cup record										Qualification record					
Year	Round	Position	Pld	W	D*	L	GF	GA	Squad	Pld	W	D*	L	GF	GA
(El Salvador) 1963	Not a CONCACAF member									Not a CONCACAF member					
(Guatemala) 1965	Not a CONCACAF member									Not a CONCACAF member					
(Honduras) 1967	Not a CONCACAF member									Not a CONCACAF member					
(Costa Rica) 1969	Did not qualify									2	1	0	1	2	4
(Trinidad and Tobago) 1971	Did not qualify									2	0	0	2	0	6
(Haiti) 1973	Did not enter									Did not enter					
(Mexico) 1977	Did not enter									Did not enter					
(Honduras) 1981	Did not enter									Did not enter					
1985	Did not enter									Did not enter					
1989	Did not enter									Did not enter					
(United States) 1991	Did not enter									Did not enter					
(Mexico) (United States) 1993	Did not enter									Did not enter					
(United States) 1996	Did not enter									Did not enter					
(United States) 1998	Did not qualify									2	0	0	2	1	4
(United States) 2000	Did not qualify									3	2	0	1	11	3
(United States) 2002	Withdrew									Withdrew					
(Mexico) (United States) 2003	Did not enter									Did not enter					
(United States) 2005	Did not qualify									3	1	1	1	5	6
(United States) 2007	Did not qualify									8	4	1	3	17	10
(United States) 2009	Did not qualify									3	1	1	1	7	4
(United States) 2011	Did not enter									Did not enter					
(United States) 2013	Did not qualify									3	1	0	2	10	5
(United States) (Canada) 2015	Did not enter									Did not enter					
(United States) 2017	Did not qualify									4	1	0	3	3	7
(United States) (Costa Rica) (Jamaica) 2019	Group stage	11th	3	1	0	2	4	4	Squad	4	3	0	1	17	4
(United States) 2021	Did not qualify									6	2	0	4	14	16
(United States) (Canada) 2023	Did not qualify									6	1	1	4	7	10
(United States) (Canada) 2025	Did not qualify									8	4	0	4	18	20
Total	Group stage	1/28	3	1	0	2	4	4	—	54	21	4	29	112	99

== Match overview ==
Tournament	Round	Opponent	Score	Venue
(United States) (Costa Rica) (Jamaica) 2019	Group stage	Haiti	1–2	San José
(United States) (Costa Rica) (Jamaica) 2019	Group stage	Costa Rica	1–2	Frisco
(United States) (Costa Rica) (Jamaica) 2019	Group stage	Nicaragua	2–0	Harrison

== Record by opponent ==
CONCACAF Championship/Gold Cup matches (by team)
Opponent	W	D	L	Pld	GF	GA
Costa Rica	0	0	1	1	1	2
Haiti	0	0	1	1	1	2
Nicaragua	1	0	0	1	2	0
