= Suriname at the CONCACAF Gold Cup =

The CONCACAF Gold Cup is North America's major tournament in senior men's soccer and determines the continental champion. Until 1989, the tournament was known as CONCACAF Championship. It is currently held every two years. From 1996 to 2005, nations from other confederations have regularly joined the tournament as invitees. In earlier editions, the continental championship was held in different countries, but since the inception of the Gold Cup in 1991, the United States are constant hosts or co-hosts.

From 1973 to 1989, the tournament doubled as the confederation's World Cup qualification. CONCACAF's representative team at the FIFA Confederations Cup was decided by a play-off between the winners of the last two tournament editions in 2015 via the CONCACAF Cup, but was then discontinued along with the Confederations Cup.

On 19 November 2019, Suriname qualified for the 2021 Gold Cup with a 2–1 CONCACAF Nations League win over Nicaragua. It was their debut in the CONCACAF Gold Cup and their first appearance in a CONCACAF tournament since 1985.

At the tournament, Suriname played against Costa Rica, Jamaica and Guadeloupe in Group C.

== Record at the CONCACAF Championship/Gold Cup ==
CONCACAF Championship
Year	Result	Position	Pld	W	D	L	GF	GA
(El Salvador) 1963	Did not qualify							
(Guatemala) 1965	Did not qualify							
(Honduras) 1967	Did not qualify							
(Trinidad and Tobago) 1971	Withdrew							
(Haiti) 1973	Did not qualify							
(Mexico) 1977	Sixth place	6th	5	0	0	5	6	17
(Honduras) 1981	Did not qualify							
1985	Group stage	9th	4	0	1	3	2	9
1989	Did not qualify							
CONCACAF Gold Cup
(United States) 1991	Did not qualify							
(United States) (Mexico) 1993	Withdrew							
(United States) 1996	Did not qualify							
(United States) 1998	Did not enter							
(United States) 2000	Did not qualify							
(United States) 2002	Did not enter							
(United States) (Mexico) 2003	Withdrew							
(United States) 2005	Did not qualify							
(United States) 2007	Did not qualify							
(United States) 2009	Did not qualify							
(United States) 2011	Did not qualify							
(United States) 2013	Did not qualify							
(Canada) (United States) 2015	Did not qualify							
(United States) 2017	Did not qualify							
(United States) (Costa Rica) (Jamaica) 2019	Did not qualify							
(United States) 2021	Group stage	10th	3	1	0	2	3	5
(Canada) (United States) 2023	Did not qualify							
(Canada) (United States) 2025	Group stage	14th	3	0	1	2	3	6
Total	Sixth place	6th	15	1	2	12	14	37

== Match overview ==
Tournament	Round	Opponent	Score	Venue
(Mexico) 1977	Final round	Guatemala	2–3	Monterrey
(Mexico) 1977	Final round	Canada	1–2	Mexico City
(Mexico) 1977	Final round	Mexico	1–8	Monterrey
(Mexico) 1977	Final round	El Salvador	2–3	Monterrey
(Mexico) 1977	Final round	Haiti	0–1	Mexico City
1985	Group stage	El Salvador	0–3	San Salvador
1985	Group stage	El Salvador	0–3	San Salvador
1985	Group stage	Honduras	1–1	Tegucigalpa
1985	Group stage	Honduras	1–2	Tegucigalpa
(United States) 2021	Group stage	Jamaica	0–2	Orlando
(United States) 2021	Group stage	Costa Rica	1–2	Orlando
(United States) 2021	Group stage	Guadeloupe	2–1	Houston
(Canada) (United States) 2025	Group stage	Costa Rica	3–4	San Diego
(Canada) (United States) 2025	Group stage	Mexico	0–2	Arlington
(Canada) (United States) 2025	Group stage	Dominican Republic	0–0	Arlington

== Record by opponent ==
CONCACAF Championship/Gold Cup matches (by team)
Opponent	W	D	L	Pld	GF	GA
Canada	0	0	1	1	1	2
Costa Rica	0	0	2	2	4	6
Dominican Republic	0	1	0	1	0	0
El Salvador	0	0	3	3	2	9
Guadeloupe	1	0	0	1	2	1
Guatemala	0	0	1	1	2	3
Haiti	0	0	1	1	0	1
Honduras	0	1	1	2	2	3
Jamaica	0	0	1	1	0	2
Mexico	0	0	2	2	1	10
