= Guyana at the CONCACAF Gold Cup =

The CONCACAF Gold Cup is North America's major tournament in senior men's soccer and determines the continental champion. Until 1989, the tournament was known as CONCACAF Championship. It is currently held every two years. From 1996 to 2005, nations from other confederations have regularly joined the tournament as invitees. In earlier editions, the continental championship was held in different countries, but since the inception of the Gold Cup in 1991, the United States are constant hosts or co-hosts.

From 1973 to 1989, the tournament doubled as the confederation's World Cup qualification. CONCACAF's representative team at the FIFA Confederations Cup was decided by a play-off between the winners of the last two tournament editions in 2015 via the CONCACAF Cup, but was then discontinued along with the Confederations Cup.

From September 2018 to March 2019, Guyana played in a tournament to determine the ten teams to go to the 2019 CONCACAF Gold Cup, and in the last matchday qualified for the Gold Cup for the first time.

In July 2021, Guyana lost against Guatemala for a spot in the 2021 Gold Cup.

== Record at the CONCACAF Championship/Gold Cup ==
CONCACAF Championship
Year	Result	Position	Pld	W	D	L	GF	GA
(El Salvador) 1963	Did not enter							
(Guatemala) 1965	Did not enter							
(Honduras) 1967	Did not enter							
(Costa Rica) 1969	Did not enter							
(Trinidad and Tobago) 1971	Did not enter							
(Haiti) 1973	Did not enter							
(Mexico) 1977	Did not enter							
(Honduras) 1981	Did not enter							
1985	Did not enter							
1989	Did not enter							
CONCACAF Gold Cup
(United States) 1991	Did not qualify							
(Mexico) (United States) 1993	Did not qualify							
(United States) 1996	Did not qualify							
(United States) 1998	Did not enter							
(United States) 2000	Did not qualify							
(United States) 2002	Did not qualify							
(Mexico) (United States) 2003	Did not qualify							
(United States) 2005	Withdrew							
(United States) 2007	Did not qualify							
(United States) 2009	Did not qualify							
(United States) 2011	Did not qualify							
(United States) 2013	Did not qualify							
(Canada) (United States) 2015	Did not qualify							
(United States) 2017	Did not qualify							
(Costa Rica) (Jamaica) (United States) 2019	Group stage	13th	3	0	1	2	3	9
(United States) 2021	Did not qualify							
(Canada) (United States) 2023	Did not qualify							
(Canada) (United States) 2025	Did not qualify							
Total	Group stage	1/28	3	0	1	2	3	9

== Match overview ==
Tournament	Round	Opponent	Score	Venue
(United States) (Costa Rica) (Jamaica) 2019	Group stage	United States	0–4	Saint Paul
(United States) (Costa Rica) (Jamaica) 2019	Group stage	Panama	2–4	Cleveland
(United States) (Costa Rica) (Jamaica) 2019	Group stage	Trinidad and Tobago	1–1	Kansas City

== Record by opponent ==
CONCACAF Championship/Gold Cup matches (by team)
Opponent	W	D	L	Pld	GF	GA
Panama	0	0	1	1	2	4
Trinidad and Tobago	0	0	1	1	1	1
United States	0	0	1	1	0	4
