= Selwyn Murren =

Trinidadian footballer (born 1944)

Personal information
- Full name: Selwyn Murren
- Date of birth: 10 November 1944 (age 81)
- Place of birth: La Brea, Trinidad and Tobago
- Position: Defender

Senior career*
Years	Team	Apps	(Gls)
c. 1967–1973	Shell		

International career
1967–1973	Trinidad and Tobago	24	(0)
Medal record
Men's football
Representing Trinidad and Tobago
CONCACAF Championship
Silver medal – second place	1973 Haiti	Team
Pan American Games
Bronze medal – third place	1967 Winnipeg	Team
- * Club domestic league appearances and goals

Selwyn Murren (born 10 November 1944) is a retired Trinidadian footballer. He played for Shell throughout his entire club career in the late 1960s and early 1970s. He also represented his native Trinidad and Tobago for the 1967 Pan American Games, the 1967, the 1969 and 1973 CONCACAF Championships.

== International career ==
Murren was first called up for the 1967 CONCACAF Championship qualifiers against Netherlands Antilles in a 2–1 victory. Despite later losing to Haiti and drawing against Jamaica, the Soca Warriors earned enough points for the Soca Warriors to make their CONCACAF debut. Around this time, he also played at the 1967 Pan American Games where Trinidad would earn bronze in the tournament. The remainder of the 1960s was spent in both the 1970 FIFA World Cup qualifiers and the 1969 CONCACAF Championship where Murren would score an own goal in the home match against Guatemala which ended 4–0 on 17 November 1968. His final international appearances came during the 1973 CONCACAF Championship where Trinidad narrowly missed their World Cup debut.

== Honours ==
Trinidad and Tobago

- CONCACAF Championship : Runner-up, 1973
- Pan American Games: Bronze medalist, 1967
