= Wilfred Cave =

Trinidadian footballer (born 1948)

Personal information
- Full name: Wilfred Cave
- Date of birth: 23 May 1948 (age 78)
- Place of birth: Point Fortin, Trinidad and Tobago
- Height: 1.73 m (5 ft 8 in)
- Position: Forward

Youth career
- –1965: Saint Benedict's College

Senior career*
Years	Team	Apps	(Gls)
1966	Caroni		
1967	Atlanta Chiefs		
1967–1972	Point Fortin Civic		
c. 1972–1973	Caroni		

International career
1968–1973	Trinidad and Tobago	9	(4)
Medal record
Men's football
Representing Trinidad and Tobago
CONCACAF Championship
Silver medal – second place	1973 Haiti	Team
- * Club domestic league appearances and goals

Wilfred Cave (born 25 May 1948) is a retired Trinidadian footballer. Nicknamed "Bound to Score", he played as a forward for Caroni and Point Fortin Civic throughout the late 1960s and the early 1970s, also enjoying a brief stint with the Atlanta Chiefs in the National Professional Soccer League. He also represented his native Trinidad and Tobago for the 1969, 1971 and 1973 CONCACAF Championships.

== Club career ==
Making his debut for Caroni in 1966, he made a strong enough debut to where Atlanta Chiefs manager Phil Woosnam took interest in the young forward and signed him for their 1967 season. However, his stint was short as he soon played for Point Fortin Civic throughout the remainder of the 1960s. He returned to Caroni in 1972 where he remained for the rest of his career.

== International career ==
Cave was first called up for the 1970 FIFA World Cup qualifiers on 17 November 1968 in an away match against Guatemala as a part of a project by Trinidad manager Michael Laing to incorporate younger players onto the Soca Warriors. Despite the match going extremely poorly in a 4–0 loss with Cave being substituted for Kenneth Butcher, in their final fixture against Haiti, alongside Everald Cummings and Leroy DeLeon, caused an upset in a 4–2 victory. He then found himself playing in the 1969 CONCACAF Championship where despite the club ending in 5th place, began to show signs of improvement into the 1970s in the subsequent 1971 CONCACAF Championship with Cave scoring in the 2–2 draw against Cuba as well as being the only scorer in the 1–6 thrashing by Haiti. Cave's greatest contribution came during the 1973 CONCACAF Championship as new manager Kevin Verity assembled a squad that nearly led the Soca Warriors to their World Cup debut.

== Honours ==
Trinidad and Tobago

- CONCACAF Championship : Runner-up, 1973
