= Leo Brewster (footballer) =

Trinidadian footballer (born 1946)

Personal information
- Full name: Leo McDowell Brewster
- Date of birth: 31 October 1950 (age 75)
- Place of birth: Point Fortin, Trinidad and Tobago
- Height: 1.85 m (6 ft 1 in)
- Position: Forward

Youth career
- Saint Benedict's College

Senior career*
Years	Team	Apps	(Gls)
1968–1973	Point Fortin Civic		
1974	Los Angeles Aztecs		

International career
1969–1973	Trinidad and Tobago	6	(2)
Medal record
Men's football
Representing Trinidad and Tobago
CONCACAF Championship
Silver medal – second place	1973 Haiti	Team
- * Club domestic league appearances and goals

Leo McDowell Brewster (born 31 October 1950) is a retired Trinidadian footballer. Nicknamed "Twinkle Toes", he played as a forward for Point Fortin Civic in his native Trinidad and the Los Angeles Aztecs in the United States. He also represented Trinidad and Tobago at the 1969 and 1973 CONCACAF Championships.

== Club career ==
Brewster began his career within Saint Benedict's College. He initially played for Point Fortin Civic throughout the 1960s and early 1970s as he was part of the winning squad for the 1969 Trinidad and Tobago FA Trophy. His talents later got him signed by Alex Perolli to play for the Los Angeles Aztecs for their 1974 season.

== International career ==
Brewster made his debut during the 1969 CONCACAF Championship where his only appearance was in the 0–5 beating by Costa Rica. He played a bigger role in the 1973 CONCACAF Championship qualifiers however, playing four matches in the tournament and scoring goals against Antigua and Barbuda and Suriname. The actual tournament however only saw Brewster make 1 appearance in the 4–0 beating against Netherlands Antilles.

== Honours ==
Trinidad and Tobago

- CONCACAF Championship : Runner-up, 1973
