= Jesús Prado =

Mexican footballer (born 1946)

Personal information
- Full name: José de Jesús Prado Velázquez
- Date of birth: 6 March 1946 (age 80)
- Place of birth: El Salto, Jalisco, Mexico
- Position: Midfielder

Youth career
- ???–1966: Río Grande

Senior career*
Years	Team	Apps	(Gls)
1966–1967	Celaya		
1967–1973	Cruz Azul		
1973–1974	Pachuca		
1974–1975	Nuevo Necaxa		

International career
1967	Mexico	6	(1)
Medal record
Men's football
Representing Mexico
Pan American Games
Gold medal – first place	1967 Winnipeg	Team
- * Club domestic league appearances and goals

José de Jesús Prado Velázquez (born 3 March 1946) is a retired Mexican footballer. Nicknamed "Zito", he played as a midfielder for Cruz Azul throughout the late 1960s and the early 1970s, winning many titles with the club as a part of its golden generation dubbed "La Máquina". He also represented Mexico for the 1967 Pan American Games and the 1967 CONCACAF Championship.

== Club career ==
Prado began his career with Celaya during the 1966–67 Mexican Segunda División. His successes with that season would catch the interest of Cruz Azul who would sign him for the following 1967–68 Mexican Primera División. Whilst his debut season was a very modest one, the following 1968–69 season would be highly successful as the club would win the 1968–69 Mexican Primera División, the 1968–69 Copa México and the 1968–69 Campeón de Campeones. The end of the season also saw the club win the 1969 CONCACAF Champions' Cup. This success would continue into the early 1970s with Prado being part of the winning squads of the 1970, 1971–72 and the 1972–73 editions of the top-flight of Mexican football. This success also saw the club win the 1970 and 1971 CONCACAF Champions' Cup. He spent the rest of his career with Pachuca and Nuevo Necaxa for the following two seasons before retiring.

== International career ==
Prado was first called up to represent Mexico for the 1967 CONCACAF Championship where he made several appearances, notably scoring the winning goal against Honduras in the final matchday on 19 March 1967. The success of the tournament would accelerate Prado's selection for the 1967 Pan American Games later that year where he served as a substitute player and despite not playing in any match in the final tournament, he was still part of the winning team that won gold.

== Personal life ==
On 8 March 1971, Prado and Club León forward Luis Estrada were shot at in Guadalajara by an unknown assailant after leaving a party with Prado being hit in his left thigh. He was also with his former teammate Octavio Muciño, two other friends and their respective dates at the restaurant Carlos O' Willys when the fatal shooting of Muciño by Jaime Muldoon Barreto occurred on 1 June 1974.
