= 1969 CONCACAF Championship qualification =

Tournament details
- Dates: 20 April – 5 November 1969
- Teams: 10 (from 1 confederation)

Tournament statistics
- Matches played: 6
- Goals scored: 14 (2.33 per match)

The 1969 CONCACAF Championship qualification competition was the qualifying contest to decide the finalists for the 1969 CONCACAF Championship – the fourth international association football championship for members of the Confederation of North, Central America and Caribbean Association Football (CONCACAF). Qualifying ran from 20 April – 5 November 1969 and was contested by the national teams of 10 CONCACAF member associations.

Guatemala, the hosts of the championship, and Costa Rica, the defending champions, qualified automatically and did not take part in the qualification competition. Five teams – Haiti, Mexico, Jamaica, the Netherlands Antilles and Trinidad and Tobago – qualified for the final tournament.

== Background ==
The Confederation of North, Central America and Caribbean Association Football (CONCACAF) was founded as a merger of the Confederación Centroamericana y del Caribe de Fútbol (CCCF) and North American Football Confederation (NAFC) in 1961. The first CONCACAF Championship, in which all the competing nations qualified automatically, was held in 1963. A qualifying competition was introduced from the second edition in 1965.

== Format ==
All 10 teams were drawn into five two-legged ties. The team scoring more goals on aggregate in each tie would qualify for the final tournament.

=== Participants ===
- Bermuda
- El Salvador
- Haiti
- Honduras
- Jamaica
- Mexico
- Netherlands Antilles
- Panama
- Trinidad and Tobago
- United States

== Summary ==
The tie between Haiti and the United States doubled as a qualification tie for the 1970 FIFA World Cup.

The competition began on 20 April when Haiti defeated the United States 2–0 in the first leg. On 11 May, Haiti won 1–0 in the second leg to qualify 3–0 on aggregate.

On 14 July, the Football War broke out between El Salvador and Honduras. The two countries were subsequently disqualified from the competition and the Trinidad and Tobago and the Netherlands Antilles were given a walkover to the final tournament.

Mexico defeated Bermuda 3–0 in the first leg on 21 October. On 2 November, Bermuda won 2–1 against Mexico but it wasn't enough to overcome the first leg defeat and Mexico qualified 4–2 on aggregate. The following day, Jamaica and Panama drew 1–1 in the first leg. Both legs of their tie would take place in Kingston, Jamaica so the second leg was played on 5 November, two days later. Jamaica defeated Panama 2–1 to qualify 3–2 on aggregate.

Qualifying stage
Team 1	Agg.	Team 2	1st leg	2nd leg
Haiti	3–0 (Note: Doubled as a qualifier for the 1970 FIFA World Cup.)	United States	2–0	1–0
Mexico	4–2	Bermuda	3–0	1–2
Jamaica	3–2	Panama	1–1	2–1 (Note: Both matches played in Kingston, Jamaica.)
Netherlands Antilles	w/o (Note: Honduras and El Salvador were disqualified as a result of the Football War.)	Honduras	—	—
Trinidad and Tobago	w/o	El Salvador	—	—

== Results ==
20 April 1969

Haiti	2–0	United States
Obas 8'; Saint-Vil 54'

Stade Sylvio Cator, Port-au-Prince
11 May 1969

United States	0–1	Haiti
		Saint-Vil 43'

San Diego

Haiti won 3–0 on aggregate.

21 October 1969

Mexico	3–0	Bermuda
Mancilla 6', 30'; Langarica 52'

Estadio Azteca, Mexico City
2 November 1969

Bermuda	2–1	Mexico
Brangman 34'; Dowling 61'		Santana 56'

Bermuda National Stadium, Hamilton

Mexico won 4–2 on aggregate.

3 November 1969

Jamaica	1–1	Panama
Ziadie (pen.)		Tapia 46'

National Stadium, Kingston
5 November 1969

Panama	1–2	Jamaica
Espinoza 20'		Largie 27'; Hill 85'

National Stadium, Kingston

Jamaica won 3–2 on aggregate.

Netherlands Antilles	Cancelled	Honduras

Honduras	Cancelled	Netherlands Antilles

Trinidad and Tobago	Cancelled	El Salvador

El Salvador	Cancelled	Trinidad and Tobago
