= Bobby Sookram =

Trinidadian footballer (born 1943)

Personal information
- Full name: Leopold Sookram
- Date of birth: 1 February 1943
- Place of birth: Diego Martin, Borough of Diego Martin, Windward Islands
- Position: Forward

Youth career
- Saint Benedict's College

Senior career*
Years	Team	Apps	(Gls)
- BP Palo Seco
	Maple		(110)

International career
1963–1967	Trinidad and Tobago	2	(1)
Medal record
Men's football
Representing Trinidad and Tobago
Pan American Games
Bronze medal – third place	1967 Winnipeg	Team
- * Club domestic league appearances and goals

Leopold "Bobby" Sookram (born 1 February 1943) is a retired Trinidadian footballer. He spent his entire career with Maple throughout the 1960s and early 1970s, becoming one of the most capped players for the club. He also represented Trinidad and Tobago for the 1966 FIFA World Cup qualifiers and the 1967 Pan American Games.

== Club career ==
Following an incredibly successful career with Saint Benedict's College, Sookram made his senior debut for BP Palo Seco before quickly transferring over to Maple. Throughout his career, he became one of the club's top scorers, being able to score five goals in a single match on two occasions with his final record holding over 110 goals within three years.

== International career ==
Sookram was first called up for a friendly against Suriname in 1963 though he was a reserve player and didn't play. He was later called up for the 1966 FIFA World Cup qualifiers two years later, being the only scorer in the 1–6 beating by Suriname with his only other appearance being in the 0–4 loss against Jamaica later that year. He also played in other friendlies against Costa Rica, Netherlands Antilles, Martinique as well as top clubs such as Arsenal, Chelsea and Wolverhampton Wanderers. He also took part in the 1967 Pan American Games, winning the Soca Warriors their first international title with bronze.

== Later life ==
On 30 January 2011, Sookram partook in a friendly match against the Youth Training Centre at Arouca alongside other footballers his generation. He also participated in another friendly on 18 February 2013 alongside other footballers of his generation such as Kelvin Berassa and Charlie Spooner.
