= Siegfried Haltman =

Surinamese footballer

Personal information
- Full name: Siegfried Haltman
- Date of birth: 26 December 1941
- Place of birth: Moengo, Surinam
- Date of death: 3 September 2016 (aged 74)
- Place of death: Paramaribo
- Position: Forward

Youth career
- Robinhood

Senior career*
Years	Team	Apps	(Gls)
1963–1966	Robinhood	?	(?)
1966	América-PE	?	(?)
1966–1967	Robinhood	?	(?)
1968	Baltimore Bays	0	(0)
1968–1969	AZ '67	3	(0)
1969–1972	Robinhood	?	(?)

International career^{‡}
1963–1966	Dutch Guyana	12	(13)
- * Club domestic league appearances and goals as of 30 December 2015 ‡ National team caps and goals as of 30 December 2015

Siegfried Haltman (26 December 1941 – 3 September 2016), known as Siki, was a Surinamese football player who played for S.V. Robinhood, América Futebol Clube (PE), Baltimore Bays, AZ'67 and for the Suriname national team during the span of his career. In 1964 he won the Surinamese Footballer of the Year award, becoming the first recipient of the award since its inception.

== Career ==
=== SV Robinhood ===
Having played in the youth ranks of S.V. Robinhood, Haltman made his debut in the Surinamese Hoofdklasse in 1963, playing with the likes of Armand Doesburg and Edwin Schal. In 1964 he led Robinhood to the national title, going undefeated all season. His performance earned him the first Surinamese Footballer of the Year award to be awarded that same year. The following two seasons saw Robinhood finishing as runners-up to crosstown rivals S.V. Transvaal. In 1966, Haltman relocated to Brazil to follow in the footsteps of one of his country and clubs most renown players Humphrey Mijnals.

=== América-PE ===
In 1966, Haltman relocated to Recife, Brazil to play for América Futebol Clube (PE). This proved to be a controversial move as the Surinamese national team were eliminated from the qualification for the 1968 Summer Olympics for fielding Haltman in a match against Trinidad and Tobago. The TTFA had filed a complaint to FIFA following the match claiming Haltman was playing professionally in Brazil and was therefore ineligible to play, since he had previously been on the roster for a match against the Netherlands Antilles. Suriname were thus eliminated from the qualifiers based on these claims. Upon questioning, América themselves later reported that Haltman had not played in any official matches as the transfer fee of ƒ8,000 Surinamese guilders, set by the SVB had never been paid. Haltman then returned to his former club in Suriname SV Robinhood. Whether Haltman appeared in any official matches for América is disputed.

=== Return to Robinhood (I.) ===
Haltman returned to Robinhood the same year finishing the 1966 and 1967 seasons as runners-up to Transvaal once more. Although Robinhood were one of the strongest teams in the country, Transvaal would prove to be the better side winning consecutive national titles. In 1968 Haltman was recruited to play in the North American Soccer League by the Baltimore Bays, which saw Haltman depart for the United States.

=== Baltimore Bays ===
In 1968, Haltman relocated to Baltimore, Maryland in the United States signing with the Baltimore Bays competing in the NASL. He was given the number 15 shirt. Negotiation between the SVB and the club went unsettled once more, and he decided to leave the club. Relocating to the Netherlands and signing with AZ '67 from Alkmaar, he made no official appearances for the Bays during his period in the United States.

=== AZ '67 ===
Haltman signed with AZ '67 from Alkmaar who were competing in the Dutch Eredivisie in 1968 only months after his last transfer. He played one season in the Netherlands, making three league appearances for AZ before moving back to Suriname, joining his former club SV Robinhood once more.

=== Return to Robinhood (II.) ===
Back in Suriname, Haltman returned to his former club Robinhood for the second time. In 1971, he helped Robinhood to yet another national title while making it to the finals of the CONCACAF Champions' Cup in 1972, losing to Olimpia from Honduras 2–0 on aggregate score in the final.

== International career ==
Haltman played for the Dutch Guyana national team, Dutch Guyana being the predecessor of Suriname, as the Dutch colony was known prior to 1976. He made his first appearance for the first team on 4 April 1963 in a friendly match against Trinidad and Tobago which ended in a 4–3 win, and Haltman scoring on his debut with the third goal. He was a part of the country's 1964 Summer Olympics qualification as well as their 1966 FIFA World Cup qualification campaigns.

In 1966, Dutch Guyana were eliminated from the 1968 Summer Olympics qualifiers, following a win against Trinidad and Tobago which would have seen Dutch Guyana through to the following round, on grounds that Haltman had been playing professionally in Brazil at the time, and was thus ineligible to compete. Haltman then appeared in the 1966 Coupe Duvalier in Haiti, making no further appearances for the national team following the incident. Officially, Haltman has scored 13 official goals for the national team in 12 appearances.

== Career statistics ==
=== International goals ===
Scores and results list Suriname' goal tally first.

Goal	Date	Venue	Opponent	Score	Result	Competition
1.	4 April 1963	National Stadion, Paramaribo, Suriname	Trinidad and Tobago	3–3	4–3	Friendly match
2.	15 October 1963	National Stadion, Paramaribo, Suriname	Netherlands Antilles	1–0	2–3	Friendly match
3.	15 October 1963	National Stadion, Paramaribo, Suriname	Netherlands Antilles	2–0	2–3	Friendly match
4.	20 March 1964	Estadio Olímpico Universitario, Mexico City, Mexico	Panama	2–0	6–1	1964 Summer Olympics qualification
5.	20 March 1964	Estadio Olímpico Universitario, Mexico City, Mexico	Panama	5–1	6–1	1964 Summer Olympics qualification
6.	7 February 1965	Queen's Park Oval, Port of Spain, Trinidad and Tobago	Trinidad and Tobago	1–1	1–4	1966 FIFA World Cup qualification
7.	14 March 1965	National Stadion, Paramaribo, Suriname	Trinidad and Tobago	1–0	6–1	1966 FIFA World Cup qualification
8.	14 March 1965	National Stadion, Paramaribo, Suriname	Trinidad and Tobago	2–0	6–1	1966 FIFA World Cup qualification
9.	13 June 1966	Sylvio Cator Stadium, Port-au-Prince, Haiti	Haiti	1–1	4–1	1966 Coupe Duvalier
10.	13 June 1966	Sylvio Cator Stadium, Port-au-Prince, Haiti	Haiti	1–1	2–1	1966 Coupe Duvalier
11.	17 June 1966	Sylvio Cator Stadium, Port-au-Prince, Haiti	Jamaica	1–2	5–3	1966 Coupe Duvalier
12.	17 June 1966	Sylvio Cator Stadium, Port-au-Prince, Haiti	Jamaica	2–2	5–3	1966 Coupe Duvalier
13.	20 June 1966	Sylvio Cator Stadium, Port-au-Prince, Haiti	Netherlands Antilles	1–0	1–1	1966 Coupe Duvalier

== Honours ==
=== Club ===
S.V. Robinhood

- Hoofdklasse (2): 1964, 1971
- CONCACAF Champions' Cup Runner-up (1): 1972

=== Individual ===
- Surinamese Footballer of the Year: 1964

== Siegfried Haltman award ==
The first Siegfried Haltman sports award is given on 27 September 2017 in Amsterdam, Holland, to an old sports reporter, Ben Douglas. The person behind that is a radio programmaker Heleen Bustamente-Blijd together with others like, Oscar Harris (Surinam soul singer), Jan Ramkisoen (a radio sports reporter), Harry Promes (a good friend of Siegfried), and Ricardo de Souza (radio programmaker). All that happened on a lokal radiostation "HULDE"(honor) in Amsterdam.

The second Siegfried Haltman sports award is given to a retired Surinamese footballer of club Transvaal Edwin Schal, on 24 October 2018, with thanks to Heleen Bustamente, together with others like Oscar Harris(Surinam soul singer), Mieke Haltman (sister of Siegfried), Harry Promes, and Renee Adriaan(friends of Siegfried).
