= Raymond Roberts (footballer) =

Trinidadian footballer (1950–2018)

Personal information
- Full name: Raymond Roberts
- Date of birth: 31 January 1951 (age 75)
- Place of birth: Santa Flora, Siparia, Trinidad and Tobago
- Date of death: 21 September 2018 (aged 67)
- Place of death: Palo Seco, Trinidad and Tobago
- Height: 1.85 m (6 ft 1 in)
- Position: Forward

Youth career
- San Fernando Technical Institute

Senior career*
Years	Team	Apps	(Gls)
- Tesoro Palo Seco
c. 1973–1992	Trintopec Palo Seco		

International career
1973–1992	Trinidad and Tobago	7	(3)
Medal record
Men's football
Representing Trinidad and Tobago
CONCACAF Championship
Silver medal – second place	1973 Haiti	Team
- * Club domestic league appearances and goals

Raymond Roberts (31 January 1951 – 21 September 2018) was a Trinidadian footballer. Nicknamed "Pumping Jack", he played as a forward for Trintopec Palo Seco throughout the 1970s. He also represented his native Trinidad and Tobago at the 1973 CONCACAF Championship and the 1992 Caribbean Cup.

== Club career ==
Throughout his club career, he spent his time with Trintopec Palo Seco. He was known for his powerful shots that could also accurately evade goalkeepers. He was purposefully a substitute player, developing a reputation for scoring goals after being called in the last 20 minutes of a match.

== International career ==
Roberts made his debut during the 1973 CONCACAF Championship qualifiers, scoring two goals in the 11–1 thrashing against Antigua and Barbuda with Roberts scoring two goals in his debut match. This momentum continued into the 2–1 victory against Suriname on 28 November 1972. During the subsequent 1973 CONCACAF Championship, he played in the defeats against hosts Haiti and Honduras as well as in the 1–0 victory over Guatemala. He wouldn't be called up again throughout the remainder of the 1970s as well as the entirety of the 1990s. Despite being 39 years old by the time of the 1992 Caribbean Cup, manager Muhammad Isa listed Roberts for the squad as he made his final international appearance in the final of the tournament with the Soca Warriors defeating Jamaica to claim their 2nd title in the tournament.

== Later life ==
Roberts later got married and had two daughters.

He died on 21 September 2018 with his funeral being held 6 days later.

== Honours ==
Trinidad and Tobago

- CONCACAF Championship : Runner-up, 1973
