= CONCACAF Gold Cup qualification =

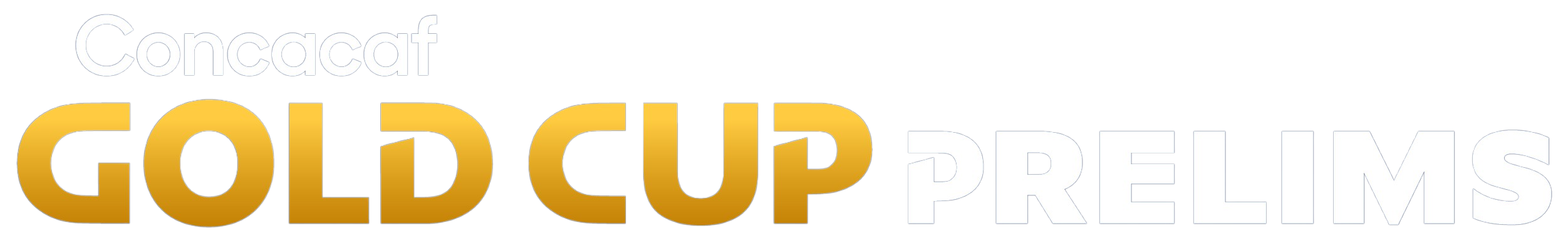
- Founded: 1963
- Region: North America, Central America, and Caribbean (CONCACAF)
- Teams: 41 (overall)
- Qualifier for: CONCACAF Gold Cup
- Related competitions: CONCACAF Nations League
- 2027 CONCACAF Gold Cup qualification

This page is a summary of the CONCACAF Gold Cup qualification, the process that CONCACAF-affiliated national association football teams go through in order to qualify for the CONCACAF Gold Cup.

The CONCACAF Gold Cup is an international association football competition held every two years between countries in North America, including Central America and the Caribbean. There have been several formats of qualifying which determine the countries that will participate in the final tournament.

== Format evolution ==
=== Number of teams entering qualification ===
CONCACAF Championship (1963–1989)
	(El Salvador) 1963	(Guatemala) 1965	(Honduras) 1967	(Costa Rica) 1969	(Trinidad and Tobago) 1971	(Haiti) 1973	(Mexico) 1977	(Honduras) 1981	1985	1989
Total entrants (Note: Data is about qualifications only (automatic qualifiers are not counted).)	2	8	8	10	12	14	15	15	10	10
Qualified through qualification	1	1	4	5	3	5	5	5	4	5
Qualified automatically	8	5	2	1	3	0	0	0	1	0
Total finalists	9	6	6	6	6	6	6	6	9	5

CONCACAF Gold Cup (1991–present)
	(United States) 1991	(Mexico) (United States) 1993	(United States) 1996	(United States) 1998	(United States) 2000	(United States) 2002	(Mexico) (United States) 2003	(United States) 2005	(United States) 2007	(United States) 2009	(United States) 2011	(United States) 2013	(Canada) (United States) 2015	(United States) 2017	(Costa Rica) (Jamaica) (United States) 2019	(United States) 2021	(Canada) (United States) 2023	(Canada) (United States) 2025	2027
Total entrants	21	27	26	30	33	31	29	38	32	33	37	32	33	31	34	41	41	41	41
Qualified through qualification	4	5	5	6	6	6	7	7	7	9	9	9	9	9	10	15	15	15	15
Qualified automatically	4	3	3	3	2	3	3	3	3	3	3	3	3	3	6	0	0	0	0
Total finalists	8	8	9	10	12	12	12	12	12	12	12	12	12	12	16	16	16	16	16

=== Resume ===
For 1963 to 1989, regional qualifiers were played for each sub-confederation.

From 1991 to 2017, similar qualification processes were used. Spots in the Gold Cup were allocated to each of the sub-confederations: the North American Football Union (NAFU), the Caribbean Football Union (CFU), and the Central American Football Union (UNCAF). Typically the NAFU would receive three berths in the tournament, and the remaining berths were divided between CFU and UNCAF. Because the NAFU only has three members, each country (Canada, Mexico, United States) would qualify automatically. The CFU and UNCAF would use the results of the Caribbean Cup and Copa Centroamericana to determine its entrants to the Gold Cup.

From 1996 to 2005, some nations from outside the CONCACAF region received invitations to the Gold Cup and did not need to qualify. From 1998 to 2003 and again from 2015 to 2017, specific qualifying tournaments were held to determine the final one or two spots in the Gold Cup.

For the 1998 Gold Cup, the two berths allocated to the Caribbean Football Union were to be awarded to the winners of the 1996 and 1997 Caribbean Cups. Because Trinidad and Tobago won both tournaments, a one match playoff between the two runners-up was played.

For the 2000 Gold Cup, Canada did not qualify automatically and competed in a round-robin playoff along with two Caribbean and one Central American nation. The top two teams would qualify for the Gold Cup.

The final spot in the 2002 Gold Cup was determined by a two-leg playoff between the fourth place team at the 2001 Caribbean Cup and the fourth place team at the 2001 UNCAF Nations Cup. This format would be re-used in 2015 and 2017.

There was not a Caribbean Cup held before the 2003 Gold Cup to determine the CFU's entrants. Instead, a one-off CFU Qualifying Tournament was held to determine the two Gold Cup participants and the two playoff participants. The two Caribbean teams were joined by the fourth place team in the 2003 UNCAF Nations Cup in a round-robin playoff for two spots in the Gold Cup.

From 2007 to 2017, no nations from outside the CONCACAF region participated in the Gold Cup. The twelve-team tournament consisted of three North American, five Central American, and four Caribbean teams. For the 2015 and 2017 tournaments, the fifth Central American spot was awarded to the winner of a two-leg playoff featuring the fifth-placed teams from the Copa Centroamericana and the Caribbean Cup. The Central American team won the playoff on both occasions.

Beginning with the 2019 Gold Cup, qualification has been linked to the CONCACAF Nations League. Held in 2018–19, the one-off CONCACAF Nations League qualifying tournament determined ten of the sixteen Gold Cup participants. For the 2021 Gold Cup, twelve spots were awarded based on the results of the 2019–20 CONCACAF Nations League, an invitation was given to Qatar, and the final three berths were determined from a two-round play-off qualifier. For the final round of qualification in 2023, twelve teams competed for three berths, while in 2025 and 2027, fourteen teams competed for seven berths.

== Participating teams ==
All national teams that are members of CONCACAF are eligible to enter the qualification for the Gold Cup. A total of 41 distinct entities have made attempts to qualify for the Gold Cup. Due to political changes, one of the entity has appeared under one incarnation (see the footnotes to the below table), the Netherlands Antilles team is now defunct.

First appearance in qualification by team
Year	Debuting teams			Successor teams	Renamed teams
Year	Teams	No.	CT	Successor teams	Renamed teams
1963	El Salvador (Note: Qualified automatically for the 1963 CONCACAF Championship as host.), Haiti, Netherlands Antilles (Note: The Netherlands Antilles national team broke apart after the 2011 CONCACAF Gold Cup.)	3	3		
1965	Guatemala (Note: Qualified automatically for the 1965 CONCACAF Championship as host.), Honduras, Nicaragua	3	6		
1967	Cuba, Jamaica, Panama, Trinidad and Tobago	4	10		
1969	Bermuda, Costa Rica, Mexico, United States	4	14		
1971	Guyana, Suriname	2	16		
1973	Antigua and Barbuda, Canada, Puerto Rico	3	19		
1977	Barbados, Dominican Republic	2	21		
1981	Grenada	1	22		
1985		0	22		
1989		0	22		
1991	Anguilla, British Virgin Islands, Cayman Islands, French Guiana, Guadeloupe, Martinique, Montserrat, Saint Kitts and Nevis, Saint Lucia	9	31		
1993	Dominica, Saint Vincent and the Grenadines, Sint Maarten (Note: Bonaire and Sint Maarten previously competed as parts of the Netherlands Antilles (1958–2010).)	3	34		
1996	Aruba, Belize	2	36		
1998		0	36		
2000	Bahamas, Turks and Caicos Islands, U.S. Virgin Islands	3	39		
2002	Saint Martin	1	40		
2003		0	40		
2005		0	40		
2007		0	40		
2009		0	40		
2011		0	40		
2013		0	40	Curaçao	
2015	Bonaire	1	41		
2017		0	41		
2019		0	41		
2021		0	41		
2023		0	41		
2025		0	41		
2027		0	41		

Successor teams inheriting the records of former teams (as considered by CONCACAF and FIFA)

Teams competing as parts of other teams

== See also ==
- FIFA World Cup qualifiers
- AFC Asian Cup qualifiers
- UEFA European Championship qualifying
