= Ulric Haynes =

Ulric Haynes is the name of:

- Ulric Haynes (diplomat) (1931-2020), American diplomat, lawyer, and university professor
- Ulric Haynes (footballer) (1948-2025), Trinidadian footballer
