= 1976 Miami Toros indoor season =

Miami Toros
1976 season
- Manager: Dr. Greg Myers
- Stadium: Bayfront Center
- NASL: Eastern Regional: Third place
- Top goalscorer: League: (Trinidad and Tobago) Warren Archibald (3 goals); All: (Trinidad and Tobago) Warren Archibald (3 goals)
- Average home league attendance: 5,274
Home colors	Away colors

The 1976 Miami Toros indoor season was the second season of the team in the North American Soccer League indoor tournament. It was part of the club's tenth season in professional soccer. This year, the team finished in third place in the Eastern Regional. They did not make the playoffs as only the top team in each of the four regions were selected. This was the last season of the indoor team and the tournament, as the NASL organized a new indoor league three years later in 1979.

== Competitions ==
=== Eastern Regional ===
played at the Bayfront Center in St. Petersburg, Florida

March 12	Miami Toros	7–6 (PK, 4-3)	Boston Minutemen	Attendance: 4,762

March 12	Tampa Bay Rowdies	9–5	Washington Diplomats

March 13	Washington Diplomats	9–3	Miami Toros	Attendance: 5,785

March 13	Tampa Bay Rowdies	5–3	Boston Minutemen

Pos	Team	G	W	L	GF	GA	GD	PTS
1	Tampa Bay Rowdies	2	2	0	14	8	+6	4
2	Washington Diplomats	2	1	1	14	12	+2	2
3	Miami Toros	2	1	1	9	15	-6	2
4	Boston Minutemen	2	0	2	9	11	-2	0

*Tampa Bay wins region, advances to semifinals
