= Steve Rakib Khan =

Trinidadian footballer (born 1948)

Personal information
- Full name: Steve Rakib Khan
- Date of birth: 26 August 1948 (age 78)
- Place of birth: Barataria, San Juan–Laventille Trinidad and Tobago
- Height: 1.72 m (5 ft 8 in)
- Position: Forward

Youth career
- Simon Fraser Red Leafs

Senior career*
Years	Team	Apps	(Gls)
1973	Point Fortin Civic		
c. 1974–?	Surprise		

International career
1973	Trinidad and Tobago	2	(0)
Medal record
Men's football
Representing Trinidad and Tobago
CONCACAF Championship
Silver medal – second place	1973 Haiti	Team
- * Club domestic league appearances and goals

Steve Rakib Khan (born 26 October 1948) is a retired Trinidadian footballer. He played as a forward for Point Fortin Civic throughout the 1970s. He also represented his native Trinidad and Tobago for the 1973 CONCACAF Championship.

== Club career ==
Graduating from Simon Fraser University in Canada, Khan initially began his career with Point Fortin Civic. He also played for Surprise Sports Club throughout the 1970s as a part of their first rosters.

== International career ==
Khan was called up by Trinidad and Tobago for the upcoming 1973 CONCACAF Championship. He made two appearances in the games against Guatemala and Mexico with his main role in the two matches man-marking any of the main goalscorers of the opposing team with both matches ending in victories despite the Soca Warriors ultimately not winning the tournament.

== Personal life ==
Khan served as a player of inspiration by future Trinidad manager Stephen Hart.

== Honours ==
Trinidad and Tobago

- CONCACAF Championship : Runner-up, 1973
