= Hugo Peña =

Guatemalan footballer (1936–2007)

Personal information
- Full name: Hugo Antonio Peña Segura
- Date of birth: 6 May 1936
- Place of birth: San José Pinula, Guatemala Department, Guatemala
- Date of death: 13 July 2007 (aged 71)
- Place of death: Guatemala City, Guatemala Department, Guatemala

Senior career*
Years	Team	Apps	(Gls)
1958–1961	Municipal		
1961–1964	Comunicaciones		
1965	FAS		
1965–1966	Universidad de San Carlos		
1966	UES		
1967	Aurora		
1967–1970	Comunicaciones		
1970–1971	Tipografía Nacional		

International career
1960–1969	Guatemala	26	(10)
Medal record
Men's football
Representing Guatemala
CONCACAF Championship
Winner	1967 Honduras
Runner-up	1965 Guatemala
- * Club domestic league appearances and goals

Hugo Antonio Peña Segura (6 May 1936 – 13 July 2007) was a Guatemalan footballer. He competed in the men's tournament at the 1968 Summer Olympics.

== Honours ==
Guatemala

- CONCACAF Championship: 1967; Runner-up, 1965
