= Andy Aleong =

Trinidadian footballer and cricketer (born 1943)

Personal information
- Full name: Andrew Winston Aleong
- Date of birth: 30 December 1943 (age 82)
- Position: Forward

Senior career*
Years	Team	Apps	(Gls)
- Maple

International career
1965–1967	Trinidad and Tobago	5	(8)
- * Club domestic league appearances and goals

Andrew Winston Aleong (born 30 December 1943) is a Trinidad and Tobago former cricketer and footballer.
