= Werner Winsemann =

German-born Canadian soccer referee

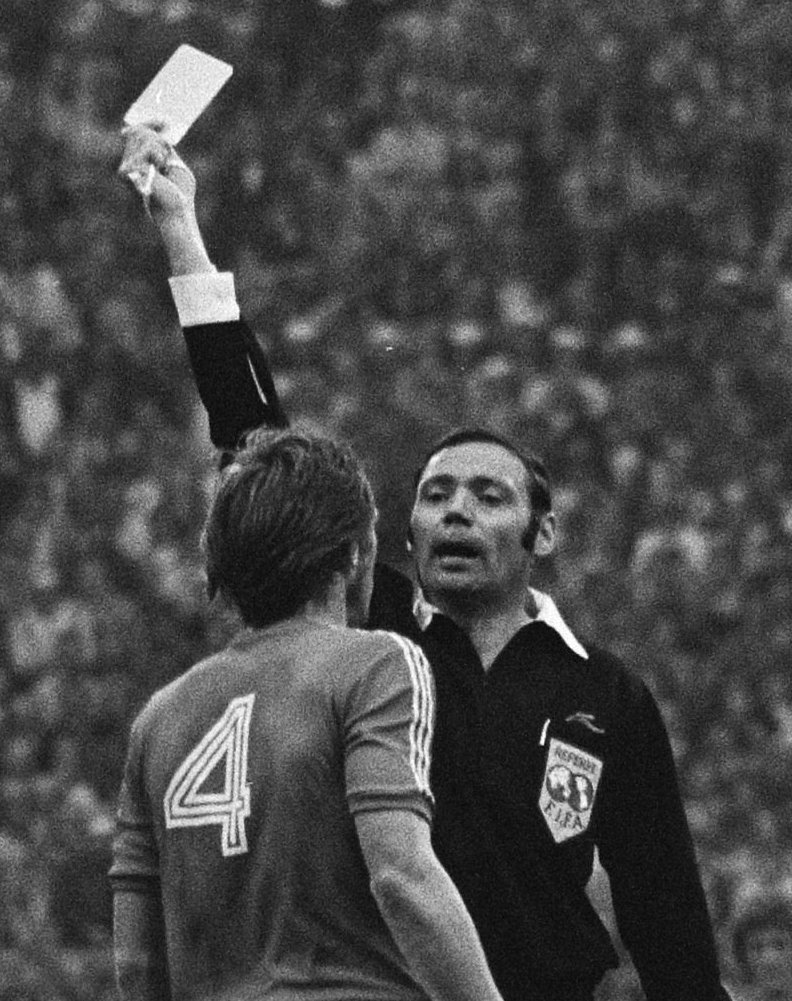
- Winsemann showing a yellow card to Sweden's Björn Nordqvist in 1974.
- Born: 15 January 1933; Germany

International
Years	League	Role

Werner Winsemann is a German-born former soccer referee. He officiated at the 1974 FIFA World Cup as a referee and linesman. At the 1978 FIFA World Cup he officiated as a linesman (now called assistant referee) only. He is the first Canadian referee to have been selected to officiate at a FIFA World Cup.

Winsemann also worked the soccer tournaments of the 1972 Olympic Games and 1976.

== Main games as referee ==
- Olympic Games 1972, First round, Group D: 12/09/1972, Poland-East Germany (2-1) - 1 yellow card given
- 1974 FIFA World Cup, First round, Groupe C: 19/06/1974: Netherlands-Sweden (0-0) - 5 yellow cards given.
- Olympic Games 1976, First round, Group A: 22/07/1976, East Germany-Spain (1-0) - 5 yellow cards given

== Honours ==
- Ray Morgan Memorial Award: 1980
