= 1966 Coupe Duvalier =

International football competition held in 1966 at Port-au-Prince, Haiti

The 1966 Coupe Duvalier was an international football competition held in Port-au-Prince, Haiti, from June 11 to June 23, 1966. Six teams competed in a round-robin competition at the Stade Sylvio Cator.

== Results ==
June 11, 1966

Netherlands Antilles	0–0	Jamaica

Stade Sylvio Cator, Port-au-Prince

June 11, 1966

Trinidad and Tobago	3–2	Suriname

Stade Sylvio Cator, Port-au-Prince

June 11, 1966

Haiti	3–2	Guadeloupe

Stade Sylvio Cator, Port-au-Prince

June 13, 1966

Jamaica	0–0	Guadeloupe

Stade Sylvio Cator, Port-au-Prince

June 13, 1966

Suriname	4–1	Haiti

Stade Sylvio Cator, Port-au-Prince

June 13, 1966

Trinidad and Tobago	1–0	Netherlands Antilles

Stade Sylvio Cator, Port-au-Prince

June 15, 1966

Trinidad and Tobago	4–1	Jamaica

Stade Sylvio Cator, Port-au-Prince

June 15, 1966

Suriname	4–0	Guadeloupe

Stade Sylvio Cator, Port-au-Prince

June 16, 1966

Haiti	3–0	Netherlands Antilles

Stade Sylvio Cator, Port-au-Prince

June 18, 1966

Suriname	5–3	Jamaica

Stade Sylvio Cator, Port-au-Prince

June 18, 1966

Netherlands Antilles	4–0	Guadeloupe

Stade Sylvio Cator, Port-au-Prince

June 18, 1966

Haiti	1–0	Trinidad and Tobago

Stade Sylvio Cator, Port-au-Prince

June 20, 1966

Netherlands Antilles	1–1	Suriname

Stade Sylvio Cator, Port-au-Prince

June 20, 1966

Guadeloupe	2–1	Trinidad and Tobago

Stade Sylvio Cator, Port-au-Prince

June 23, 1966

Haiti	3–0	Jamaica

Stade Sylvio Cator, Port-au-Prince

== Table ==
	Team	Pld	W	D	L	GF	GA	GD	Pts
1	Haiti	5	4	0	1	11	6	+5	8
2	Suriname	5	3	1	1	16	8	+6	7
3	Trinidad and Tobago	5	3	0	2	9	6	+3	6
4	Netherlands Antilles	5	1	2	2	5	5	0	4
5	Guadeloupe	5	1	1	3	4	12	-8	3
6	Jamaica	5	0	2	3	4	12	-8	2
