= Roger Saint-Vil =

Haitian footballer (1949–2020)

Personal information
- Date of birth: 8 December 1949
- Place of birth: Port-au-Prince, Haiti
- Date of death: 7 June 2020 (aged 70)
- Place of death: New York City, New York, United States
- Position: Left winger

Senior career*
Years	Team	Apps	(Gls)
1963	Zénith		
1964–?	Racing Club Haïtien		
- Violette Athletic Club
1973–1974	Archibald FC		
1975	Cincinnati Comets	?	(8)

International career
- Haiti
- * Club domestic league appearances and goals

Roger Saint-Vil (also spelled St. Vil) (8 December 1949 – 7 June 2020) was a Haitian footballer who played professionally in the United States and Haiti. A left winger, he was a member of the Haitian national team at the 1974 FIFA World Cup.

Saint-Vil attended Tertullien Guilbaud primary school. In 1963 when he was sixteen, he signed for Zénith in the Haitian Third Division. In 1964, he moved to Racing Club Haïtien. He began with team's third division team, but after three games, he was called up to the first team. At some point, he moved to Violette Athletic Club. In 1974, he played for Archibald FC in Trinidad and Tobago. In 1975, he played an unknown number of games, scoring eight goals, with the Cincinnati Comets of the American Soccer League.

In 1974, Saint-Vil was an integral part of the Haiti national team's successful qualification campaign for the 1974 FIFA World Cup. His older brother, Guy Saint-Vil, was also a professional player. On 7 June 2020 he died in New York.
