= Steve David =

Trinidad and Tobago footballer

Personal information
- Date of birth: 3 November 1951 (age 74)
- Place of birth: Point Fortin, Trinidad and Tobago
- Height: 6 ft 0 in (1.83 m)
- Position: Forward

Senior career*
Years	Team	Apps	(Gls)
1973	Police		
1973–1974	San Luis F.C.		
1974–1976	Miami Toros	53	(37)
1977–1978	Los Angeles Aztecs	27	(26)
1978	Detroit Express	11	(2)
1978–1979	California Surf	40	(16)
1980	San Diego Sockers	6	(2)
1980–1981	San Jose Earthquakes	38	(17)
1981–1983	Phoenix Inferno (indoor)	91	(119)
1983–1984	Phoenix Pride (indoor)	22	(15)

International career
1972–1976	Trinidad and Tobago	16	(16)
Medal record
Men's football
Representing Trinidad and Tobago
CONCACAF Championship
Runner-up	1973 Haiti
- * Club domestic league appearances and goals

Steve David (born 11 March 1951 in Point Fortin, Trinidad) is a Trinidadian former North American Soccer League and international football player.

== Club career ==
David began his professional career with Police in Trinidad and Tobago. In 1974, he signed with the Miami Toros in the North American Soccer League. That season, the Toros had reached the finals, losing the championship games to Los Angeles 4–3. David had a standout second season and was named the 1975 NASL MVP as the Toros reached the league cup play-off semi-final stage. After a poor 1976 season, scoring only one goal in thirteen games, the Toros traded him to the Los Angeles Aztecs. He had a rebound in form, scoring twenty-six goals in twenty-four games. However, he began expressing dissatisfaction with the Aztecs at the beginning of the 1978 season: after a 1–2 start, the Aztecs sent David to the Detroit Express in exchange for a 1979 first-round draft pick and cash on 22 April 1978.

Unhappy in Detroit, David played only eleven games with the Express before they sent him back to Southern California to play for the Anaheim-based California Surf. He finished the 1978 season, then played the entire 1979 season with the Surf before moving down the coast to begin the 1980 season with the San Diego Sockers -- until they sent him back up the coast, to the San Jose Earthquakes. (This made David the only player to appear for four California-based NASL teams.) He remained with the Earthquakes through the 1981 season after which he left the league, finishing his NASL career as the league's eighth all-time leading scorer with 228 points in 175 games. (He also notched an even 100 goals in the NASL, good enough for seventh place.) In the fall of 1981, David moved indoors and signed with the Phoenix Inferno of the Major Indoor Soccer League. He finished the 1981–82 season fourth in scoring with 81 points in 44 games and notched 81 points in 47 games in 1982-83, good enough for ninth place.

== International career ==
David scored 16 goals in World Cup qualifiers for T&T between 1972 and 1976. He was inducted into the Trinidad and Tobago Football Hall of Fame in 2008.

== Career statistics ==
=== International goals ===
#	Date	Venue	Opponent	Score	Result	Competition
1.	10 November 1972	King George V Park, Port of Spain, Trinidad and Tobago	Antigua and Barbuda	11–1	Win	1973 CONCACAF Championship qualification
2.	10 November 1972	King George V Park, Port of Spain, Trinidad and Tobago	Antigua and Barbuda	11–1	Win	1973 CONCACAF Championship qualification
3.	10 November 1972	King George V Park, Port of Spain, Trinidad and Tobago	Antigua and Barbuda	11–1	Win	1973 CONCACAF Championship qualification
4.	19 November 1972	Antigua Recreation Ground, St. John's, Antigua and Barbuda	Antigua and Barbuda	1–2	Win	1973 CONCACAF Championship qualification
5.	30 November 1972	Skinner Park, San Fernando, Trinidad and Tobago	Suriname	1–1	Draw	1973 CONCACAF Championship qualification
6.	29 November 1973	Stade Sylvio Cator, Port-au-Prince, Haiti	Honduras	2–1	Lost	1973 CONCACAF Championship
7.	4 December 1973	Stade Sylvio Cator, Port-au-Prince, Haiti	Haiti	2–1	Lost	1973 CONCACAF Championship
8.	10 December 1973	Stade Sylvio Cator, Port-au-Prince, Haiti	Guatemala	1–0	Win	1973 CONCACAF Championship
9.	14 December 1973	Stade Sylvio Cator, Port-au-Prince, Haiti	Mexico	4–0	Win	1973 CONCACAF Championship
10.	17 December 1973	Stade Sylvio Cator, Port-au-Prince, Haiti	Netherlands Antilles	4–0	Win	1973 CONCACAF Championship
11.	17 December 1973	Stade Sylvio Cator, Port-au-Prince, Haiti	Netherlands Antilles	4–0	Win	1973 CONCACAF Championship
12.	17 December 1973	Stade Sylvio Cator, Port-au-Prince, Haiti	Netherlands Antilles	4–0	Win	1973 CONCACAF Championship
13.	15 August 1976	Barbados National Stadium, Bridgetown, Barbados	Barbados	2–1	Lost	1977 CONCACAF Championship qualification
14.	14 November 1976	National Stadion, Paramaribo, Suriname	Suriname	1–1	Draw	1977 CONCACAF Championship qualification
15.	18 December 1976	Stade de Baduel, Cayenne, French Guiana	Suriname	3–2	Lost	1977 CONCACAF Championship qualification
16.	18 December 1976	Stade de Baduel, Cayenne, French Guiana	Suriname	3–2	Lost	1977 CONCACAF Championship qualification
Correct as of 24 July 2011

== Honours ==
Trinidad and Tobago

- CONCACAF Championship : Runner-up, 1973

== Sources ==
- Trinidad Express article
- NASL homepage
- NASL/MISL stats
