= Sedley Joseph =

Trinidad and Tobago footballer (1939–2020)

Personal information
- Date of birth: 4 December 1939
- Date of death: 8 June 2020 (aged 80)
- Position: Midfielder

Senior career*
| Years | Team | Apps | (Gls) |
- Maple

International career
| 1965–1967 | Trinidad and Tobago | 9 | (0) |
- * Club domestic league appearances and goals

Sedley Joseph (4 December 1939 – 8 June 2020) was a Trinidad and Tobago footballer.
