= Ulric Haynes (footballer) =

Trinidadian footballer (1948–2025)

Personal information
- Full name: Ulric Noel Haynes
- Date of birth: 12 December 1948
- Place of birth: Tacarigua, East–West Corridor Trinidad and Tobago
- Date of death: 20 July 2025 (aged 76)
- Place of death: Tacarigua, East–West Corridor Trinidad and Tobago
- Position: Forward

Youth career
- ?–1964: St Mary’s Anglican Primary

Senior career*
Years	Team	Apps	(Gls)
1965–1977	Malvern		

International career
1968–1971	Trinidad and Tobago	12	(2)
- * Club domestic league appearances and goals

Ulric Noel Haynes (12 December 1948 – 20 July 2025) was a Trinidadian footballer. Nicknamed "Buggy", he played as a forward for Malvern throughout the 1970s. He also represented Trinidad and Tobago for the 1969 and 1971 CONCACAF Championships.

== Club career ==
Haynes began his career within the St Mary’s Anglican Primary School where he played both cricket and football before he was signed for Malvern in the 1960s. Throughout the 1970s, he served as captain for the 1976 CONCACAF Champions' Cup where he served until his retirement in 1977.

== International career ==
Haynes was first called up for Trinidad and Tobago in the 1970 FIFA World Cup qualifiers in a 4–0 beating by Guatemala on 17 November with Haynes playing the other legged match against the Chapines and in both matches against Haiti. Despite not qualifying for the 1970 FIFA World Cup, Haynes was able to play for the 1969 CONCACAF Championship in all five games, scoring two goals against Jamaica and Netherlands Antilles throughout the tournament. He was then called up for the subsequent 1971 CONCACAF Championship where he played in the draws against Honduras and Cuba as well as the 0–1 loss against Mexico. His international career following his participation in a boycott over not having their suspensions removed by the TTFA over scheduling and training conflicts alongside Wilfred Cave, Leroy Spann, Trevor Leiba, Godfrey Harris and Renwick Williams.

== Later life ==
Haynes remained active in his activities for his former club of Malvern. In 2013, he hosted a reunion that featured his former teammates including Selby Browne, Ulric Boxhill, Desmond “Baby” Headley, Chris Mendes, Michael Saldenha and Russell Bristol as they all went on to coach the club in some capacity.

He had also been active in his own local community of Tacaringua, opening up the Buggy Haynes Coaching School in 1988 with Ben Sambrano, teaching football, cricket and athletics.

Haynes died on 24 January 2025 following a long illness.
