= Everald Cummings =

Trinidadian footballer (born 1948)

Personal information
- Date of birth: 28 August 1948 (age 78)
- Place of birth: Port of Spain, Trinidad and Tobago
- Position: Midfielder

Youth career
- Fatima College

Senior career*
Years	Team	Apps	(Gls)
1964–1966	Paragon		
1967–1970	Atlanta Chiefs	23	(12)
1972–1973	New York Cosmos	19	(6)
1974–1976	Veracruz		
1976	Boston Minutemen		
1978–1979	Cleveland Force (indoor)	6	(1)

International career
- Trinidad and Tobago

Managerial career
- Trinidad and Tobago
Medal record
Men's football
Representing Trinidad and Tobago (as player)
CONCACAF Championship
Runner-up	1973 Haiti
Representing Trinidad and Tobago (as manager)
CONCACAF Championship
Third place	1989 North America
- * Club domestic league appearances and goals

Everald "Gally" Cummings (born 28 August 1948) is a Trinidadian former football midfielder who played for six years in the North American Soccer League. He also played professionally in Mexico. He was a mainstay of the Trinidad and Tobago national team in the 1960s and 1970s and later became the national team coach of Trinidad and Tobago in the 1980s during the Strike Squad years. He is listed in the Top 100 Sportsmen and Sportswomen of the Millennium (1900–1999) by the Trinidad and Tobago Ministry of Sports and was inducted into the T&T Sports Hall of Fame in 1989.

== Early career ==
Born in Port of Spain, Trinidad and Tobago, Cummings attended the Fatima College secondary school in Port of Spain playing for his school's football team. He helped them win their first ever Intercol championship (nationwide football competition amongst schools) in 1965. He was also a member of the Trinidad and Tobago Youth Team in 1966 that toured Jamaica.

== Club career ==
Cummings began playing for local Trinidad club Paragon in the Northern Football Association Premier Division in 1964. In 1967, he joined the Atlanta Chiefs in the North American Soccer League with whom he was champions in 1968 until leaving the club in 1970. In 1972, he signed with the New York Cosmos, winning the championship with them the same year. He left the club in 1973. He moved to Veracruz in Mexico in 1974 until 1976. He also played with the Boston Minutemen in 1977. He played indoor football with the Cleveland Force in the Major Indoor Soccer League in the United States in 1979.

== International career ==
Everald Cummings was a regular with the Trinidad and Tobago national team from at least 17 November 1968 when it lost 4–0 to Guatemala in World Cup qualifying until 18 December 1976 when it lost to Suriname 3–2. He was a member of the national team for the 1973 CONCACAF Championship to qualify for the 1974 FIFA World Cup when Trinidad and Tobago had five goals controversially disallowed against Haiti and fell two points short of qualifying. He was named T&T Sportsman of the Year in 1973 and Most Valuable Player during the World Cup Qualification Preliminary Series.

== Coaching career ==
Cummings was coach of the Trinidad and Tobago team, dubbed the Strike Squad during the qualification campaign for the 1990 FIFA World Cup in Italy. Trinidad and Tobago came within one game of qualifying for the World Cup Finals in Italy, needing only a draw to qualify in their final game played at home against the United States on 19 November 1989. In front of an over capacity crowd of over 30,000 at the National Stadium on Red Day, Paul Caligiuri of the USA scored the only goal of the game in the 38th minute dashing T&T's qualification hopes. For the good behaviour of the crowd at the stadium despite the devastating loss and overcrowded stands, the spectators of Trinidad and Tobago were awarded the FIFA Fair Play Award in 1989. Cummings was awarded the Chaconia Silver Medal (Second highest National Award) alongside his players for their efforts in the campaign.

In recent years he has coached teams in the TT Pro League including South Starworld Strikers and North East Stars.

== Honours ==
=== Player ===
Trinidad and Tobago

- CONCACAF Championship : Runner-up, 1973

=== Manager ===
Trinidad and Tobago

- CONCACAF Championship : Third-place, 1989
