= Luis Hernández (footballer, born 1949) =

Cuban footballer

Personal information
- Full name: Luis Hernández Heres
- Date of birth: 24 August 1949 (age 77)
- Place of birth: Cuba
- Position: Midfielder

Senior career*
Years	Team	Apps	(Gls)
- La Habana

International career
1976	Cuba Olympic	2	(0)
- * Club domestic league appearances and goals

Luis Hernández Heres (born 24 August 1949) is a Cuban former footballer who competed in the 1976 Summer Olympics.

== International career ==
He represented his country in two games at the 1976 Summer Olympics.

== Football administration ==
Subsequently, he became a businessman and football administrator, and a member of the FIFA Council, the main decision-making body of FIFA, the governing body of association football.

Hernández was elected to the FIFA Council in May 2016, as one of three representatives of the Confederation of North, Central America and Caribbean Association Football (CONCACAF).
