= Saint Benedict's College (Trinidad and Tobago) =

Secondary school in Trinidad and Tobago

Coordinates: 10.2501°N 61.483°W

Information
- Established: 1956
- Founder: Dom Basil Matthews

St. Benedict's College is a secondary school located in La Romaine, Trinidad and Tobago. The school was founded by Benedictine monk, Dom Basil Matthews, and opened on September 11, 1956 to 220 students.

== History ==
The school was founded by a Benedictine monk, Dom Basil Matthews, who was ordained priest in the Order of St Benedict in 1935, one of the first Trinidadians to be elected to that office. When Dom Basil was sent to minister in the San Fernando region in the early 1950s, he felt that he had to do something about the lack of educational opportunity in the district.

In 1953, Matthews began laying the foundation for what evolved into St Benedict's College. His main purpose in establishing the school, as he revealed afterwards, was "to cater for children from the countryside who could not make it out to town and did not have a chance at even passing the Common Entrance Examination." He encouraged the church to purchase land from the Lucky family in La Romaine and their home was used as the building to house the primary school. Many scoffed at his idea but Dom Basil was undaunted and with the support of Archbishop Ryan, some businessmen and parishioners, he was able to bring his dream to fruition.

St. Benedict's College opened its doors on September 11, 1956 with 220 students. It was to be one of the first comprehensive schools in the country for besides the normal grammar school subjects, a number of technical and vocational subjects formed part of the curriculum. In 1957, with support of the then Minister of Education, Dr. Patrick Solomon, St. Benedict's became a government assisted school. There was a steady expansion from then on. the staff room block was opened in 1960. the auditorium in 1961 and the playing field in 1963 at La-Romaine by the Sea. Dom Basil believed that excellence in sports would develop the self-esteem of students which would lead to an improvement in academic standards.

In 1968, Dom Basil resigned and migrated to the United States. Mr. Caines, his successor, endeavored to revert the College to a traditional grammar school, tech-voc subjects were removed and co-curricular activities and sports were de-emphasized. In 1983, Mr. Caines retired and he was succeeded by Declan Singh. Once more there was a change of policy, co-curricular activities were once more emphasized, the playing field was restored enabling St. Benedict's to win the South Zone Intercol five times between 1988 and 2000. St. Benedict's won the National Intercol in 1998.

=== Academics ===
The academic performance of the school also improved and since 1995 the pass rate has been above 75%. A'Levels was introduced in 1988 and the school now offers 11 subjects with C.A.P.E. were introduced in 2004. Despite the school being of Christian domination it provides services to all religions of Trinidad and Tobago. The students are from all religions and are free to practice their religious traditions. Students participate in the Secondary Schools Snaskritik Sangam competitions on a regular basis.

=== Facilities ===
Computer facilities were introduced in 1986 and today the school has computer lab with internet access. In 1997, a new building to house the Staff Room, AV Room, 6th Form block and toilets was erected. It was formerly opened by the Prime Minister in June 1998.

In 2001, a new auditorium was constructed. It has a seating capacity of 600 and standing room for 800.

=== Activities ===
The football playing field was to be the breeding ground of a number of national footballers and Warren Archibald, Leroy De Leon, Jan Steadman, Steve David, Dick Furlonge, Wilfred Cave, and Bobby Sookram. St. Benedict's had successful football teams between 1964 and 1968. St. Benedict's College first won the national inter college football final in 1963. In the late 1960s there were as many as 9 players form the St. Benedict's College Football Team in the National Football Squad. St. Benedict's College in this early period offered a wide range of extracurricular activities. There was a college orchestra, a college choir, a cadet unit and a lot of other activities.

== See also ==
- List of schools in Trinidad and Tobago
