= Kelvin Berassa =

Trinidadian footballer (born 1944)

Personal information
- Full name: Kelvin Berassa
- Date of birth: 2 January 1939
- Place of birth: Siparia, Borough of Siparia, Windward Islands
- Date of death: 7 August 2021 (aged 82)
- Place of death: Atlanta, Georgia, U.S.
- Position: Forward

Youth career
- Progressive

Senior career*
Years	Team	Apps	(Gls)
1960–1965	Malvern		
1965–1968	Regiment		
1968–1970	Brooklyn Juniors		

International career
1967–1973	Trinidad and Tobago	25	(20)
Medal record
Men's football
Representing Trinidad and Tobago
Pan American Games
Bronze medal – third place	1967 Winnipeg	Team
- * Club domestic league appearances and goals

Kelvin Stephen Berassa (2 January 1939 – 7 August 2021) was a Trinidadian footballer. Nicknamed "KB", he played as a forward for Malvern and Regiment throughout the 1960s. He also represented his native Trinidad and Tobago for the 1967 Pan American Games and the 1967 CONCACAF Championship.

== Club career ==
Emerging from Progressive Educational Institute as one of the best players from the school, he joined Malvern as an aggressive forward which was an uncommon archetype in Trinidad at the time. His debut 1960 season saw him win the Trinidad and Tobago FA Trophy with the following 1961 also seeing a back-to-back title, playing alongside other players such as Tim Lambkin and Clive Niles. Despite this, the club went into a dry spell as the 1960s progressed so he then played for Regiment where he was part of the winning squads for the 1965 and 1966 Port of Spain Football League, also winning the 1966 and 1967 FA Trophy. He spent his final years playing abroad for the Brooklyn Juniors in the United States until his retirement in 1970.

== International career ==
Berassa was first called up to represent Trinidad and Tobago for the 1967 Pan American Games which was their first major tournament. He excelled at the tournament, scoring three goals in the 5–2 victory against Colombia as well as scoring in the 1–0 against Argentina, contributing to the team earning bronze. He also played in the 1967 CONCACAF Championship, scoring against Nicaragua on 17 March 1967. Throughout his career, Berassa made 25 appearances and scored 20 goals.

== Personal life ==
Following his migration to the United States in 1968, he met his second wife Eula whilst working at Wall Street and later had 1 child (son) with her: Dexter alongside two children from his previous marriage: Jillian, and Julien. He died on 7 August 2021 at the Emory University Hospital.
