= Raúl Arellano (footballer, born 1939) =

Mexican footballer

Personal information
- Full name: Raúl Arellano Gallo
- Date of birth: 17 January 1939 (age 87)
- Place of birth: Guadalajara, Mexico
- Height: 1.74 m (5 ft 9 in)
- Position: Forward

International career
Years	Team	Apps	(Gls)
1967	Mexico	2	(0)

Raúl Arellano Gallo (born 17 January 1939) is a Mexican former footballer. He competed in the men's tournament at the 1964 Summer Olympics.
