= Luis Estrada (footballer) =

Mexican footballer (born 1948)

Personal information
- Full name: José Luis Estrada Luévanos
- Date of birth: 7 July 1948 (age 78)
- Place of birth: El Salto, Jalisco, Mexico
- Position: Forward

Senior career*
| Years | Team | Apps | (Gls) |
| 1964–1973 | León | 205 | (76) |
| 1973–1977 | Cruz Azul | 104 | (30) |
| 1977–1978 | Atlético Potosino | 35 | (5) |
| 1978–1979 | León | 28 | (2) |
| 1979–1980 | Unión de Curtidores | 12 | (1) |
| Total | | 384 | (114) |

International career
| 1967–1971 | Mexico | 22 | (7) |

Managerial career
- 1984–1985: Toluca
- * Club domestic league appearances and goals

José Luis Estrada Luévanos (Note: In this Spanish name, the first or paternal surname is Estrada and the second or maternal family name is Luévanos.) (born 7 July 1948) nicknamed El Chino, is a Mexican former professional footballer who played as a forward. He represented the Mexico national team between 1967 and 1971 and competed at the 1968 Summer Olympics.

== Club career ==
Estrada spent the majority of his playing career with Club León, making over 200 league appearances across two stints. During the 1968–69 season, he finished as the top goalscorer in the Mexican Primera División with 24 goals. With León, he won two Copa México titles (1970–71 and 1971–72) and two Campeón de Campeones trophies.

In 1973, Estrada joined Cruz Azul, where he contributed to the club winning the 1973–74 Primera División league title and the 1973–74 Campeón de Campeones. He later played for Atlético Potosino, returned to León in 1978, and finished his career with Unión de Curtidores in 1980.

== International career ==
He competed in the 1968 Summer Olympics.

=== International goals ===
Scores and results list Mexico's goal tally first.

| No | Date | Venue | Opponent | Score | Result | Competition |
|---|---|---|---|---|---|---|
| 1. | 12 March 1967 | Estadio Tiburcio Carías Andino, Tegucigalpa, Honduras | Trinidad and Tobago | 1–0 | 4–0 | 1967 CONCACAF Championship |
| 2. | 12 March 1967 | Estadio Tiburcio Carías Andino, Tegucigalpa, Honduras | Trinidad and Tobago | 3–0 | 4–0 | 1967 CONCACAF Championship |
| 3. | 14 March 1967 | Estadio Tiburcio Carías Andino, Tegucigalpa, Honduras | Haiti | 1–0 | 3–0 | 1967 CONCACAF Championship |
| 4. | 30 January 1968 | Estadio León, León, Mexico | Colombia | 3–0 | 3–0 | Friendly |
| 5. | 27 August 1968 | Estadio Azteca, Mexico City, Mexico | Chile | 3–1 | 3–1 | Friendly |
| 6. | 29 September 1968 | Estadio León, León, Mexico | Ethiopia | 1–0 | 3–0 | Friendly |
| 7. | 6 July 1971 | Estadio Azteca, Mexico City, Mexico | Greece | 1–0 | 1–1 | Friendly |
