= 1967 CONCACAF Championship =

Tournament details
- Host country: Honduras
- Dates: 5–19 March
- Teams: 6 (from 1 confederation)
- Venue: 1 (in 1 host city)

Final positions
- Champions: Guatemala (1st title)
- Runners-up: Mexico
- Third place: Honduras
- Fourth place: Trinidad and Tobago

Tournament statistics
- Matches played: 15
- Goals scored: 35 (2.33 per match)
- Top scorer: (Guatemala) Manuel Recinos (4 goals)

The 1967 CONCACAF Championship was the third edition of the CONCACAF Championship. The final tournament took place from 5 to 19 March in Tegucigalpa, Honduras.

Mexico qualified automatically as defending champions, while Honduras did it as the host nation. Guatemala won the title after finishing in first place of a round-robin tournament between the six teams participating in the final tournament. It is the only CONCACAF championship won to date by Guatemala, who was managed by Rubén Amorín. Mexico, managed by Ignacio "Nacho" Trelles, finished second, while Honduras finished third.

In the crucial match of the competition, Guatemala defeated Mexico (1–0) with a late goal by Manuel Recinos.

== Teams ==
- Guatemala
- Haiti
- Honduras (Hosts)
- Mexico (Defending Champions)
- Nicaragua
- Trinidad and Tobago

== Venues ==
Tegucigalpa
Estadio Tiburcio Carías Andino
Capacity: 35,000
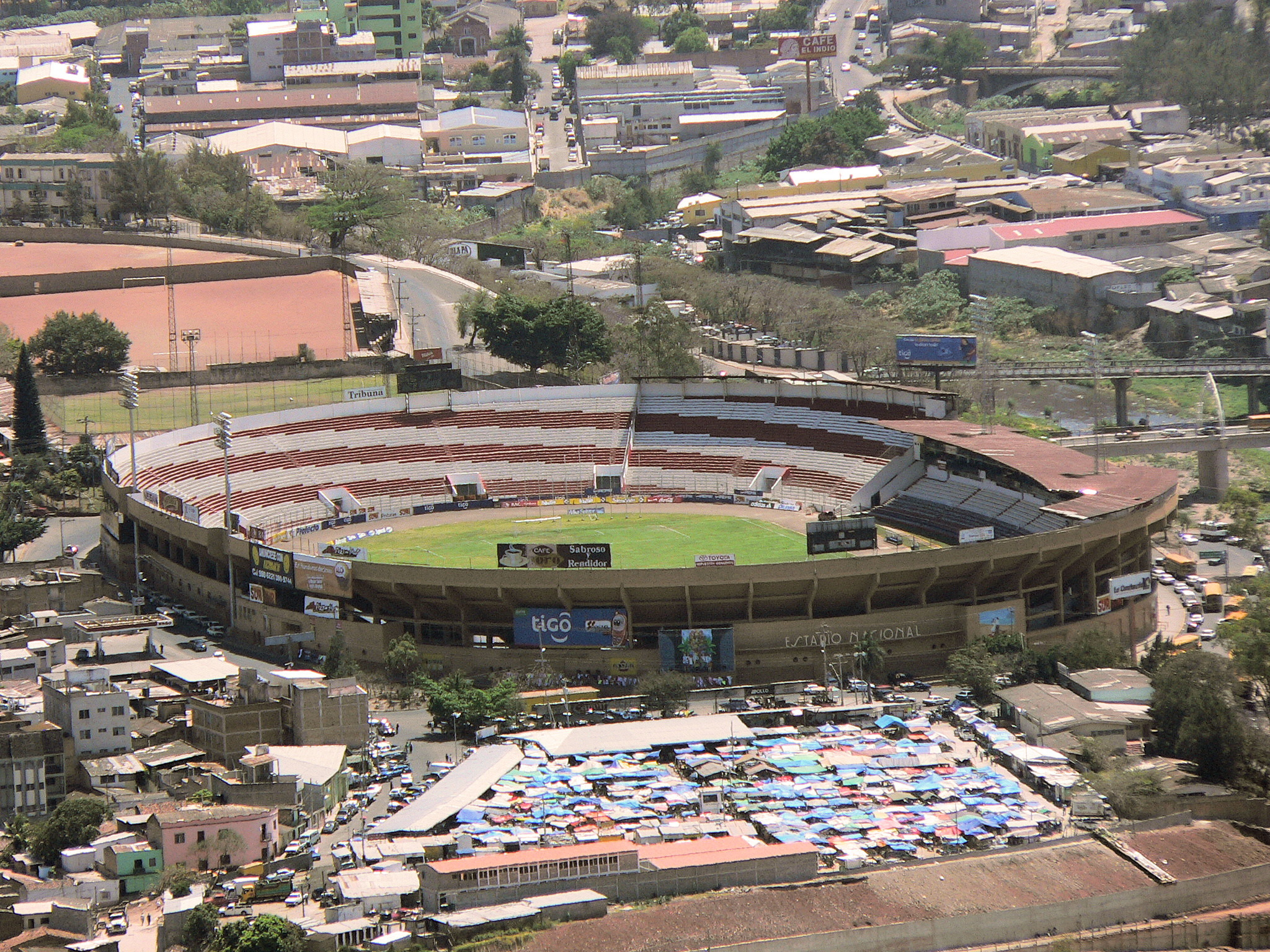

== Final tournament ==
=== Final standings ===
Pos	Team	Pld	W	D	L	GF	GA	GD	Pts
1	Guatemala	5	4	1	0	7	1	+6	9
2	Mexico	5	4	0	1	10	1	+9	8
3	Honduras	5	2	2	1	4	2	+2	6
4	Trinidad and Tobago	5	2	0	3	6	10	−4	4
5	Haiti	5	1	0	4	5	9	−4	2
6	Nicaragua	5	0	1	4	3	12	−9	1

=== Matches ===
5 March 1967

Honduras	1–0	Trinidad and Tobago
Cruz 35'

Estadio Tiburcio Carías Andino, Tegucigalpa

6 March 1967

Guatemala	2–1	Haiti
Peña 60'; Recinos 62'		Saint-Vil 21'

Estadio Tiburcio Carías Andino, Tegucigalpa

6 March 1967

Mexico	4–0	Nicaragua
Arellano 36', 43', 53'; Lapuente 85'

Estadio Tiburcio Carías Andino, Tegucigalpa
Referee: Pontaza (Guatemala)

8 March 1967

Trinidad and Tobago	3–2	Haiti
Browne 4'; Corneal 17', 52' (pen.)	Report	Saint-Vil 33' (pen.); Pierre 56'

Estadio Tiburcio Carías Andino, Tegucigalpa

8 March 1967

Honduras	1–1	Nicaragua
Máximo 25'		Sobalvarro 10'

Estadio Tiburcio Carías Andino, Tegucigalpa

10 March 1967

Haiti	2–1	Nicaragua
Némurin 75'; Désir 85'		Romero 14'

Estadio Tiburcio Carías Andino, Tegucigalpa

10 March 1967

Guatemala	1–0	Mexico
Recinos 83'

Estadio Tiburcio Carías Andino, Tegucigalpa
Referee: Van Rosberg (Netherlands Antilles)

12 March 1967

Mexico	4–0	Trinidad and Tobago
Estrada 22', 53'; Cerda Canela 40'; Bustos 83'

Estadio Tiburcio Carías Andino, Tegucigalpa
Attendance: 17,813
Referee: Pontaza (Guatemala)

12 March 1967

Honduras	0–0	Guatemala

Estadio Tiburcio Carías Andino, Tegucigalpa

14 March 1967

Guatemala	2–0	Trinidad and Tobago
Roldán 35'; De León 79'	Report

Estadio Tiburcio Carías Andino, Tegucigalpa

14 March 1967

Mexico	1–0	Haiti
Estrada 39'

Estadio Tiburcio Carías Andino, Tegucigalpa
Referee: Dimas (Honduras)

17 March 1967

Trinidad and Tobago	3–1	Nicaragua
Browne 30'; Berassa 85', 86'	Report	Cuadra 82'

Estadio Tiburcio Carías Andino, Tegucigalpa
Referee: Morán (Panama)

17 March 1967

Honduras	2–0	Haiti
Grey 40', 78'	Report

Estadio Tiburcio Carías Andino, Tegucigalpa
Referee: Van Rosberg (Netherlands Antilles)

19 March 1967

Guatemala	2–0	Nicaragua
Peña 30'; Recinos 33'	Report

Estadio Tiburcio Carías Andino, Tegucigalpa

19 March 1967

Honduras	0–1	Mexico
		Prado 34'

Estadio Tiburcio Carías Andino, Tegucigalpa
Referee: Landauer (USA)

1967 CONCACAF Championship winners

Guatemala
First title

== Team of the Tournament ==
Ideal XI by RSSSF
Goalkeeper	Defenders	Midfielders	Forwards
(Guatemala) Julio García	(Guatemala) Alberto López (Mexico) Gustavo Peña (Honduras) Nilmo Edwards	(Guatemala) Jorge Roldán (Mexico) Raúl Arellano	(Guatemala) Hugo Peña (Guatemala) Manuel Recinos (Haiti) Guy Saint-Vil (Mexico) Luis Estrada (Honduras) Enrique Grey

== See also ==
- CONCACAF Gold Cup
