= Stade Sylvio Cator =

Stadium in Port-au-Prince, Haiti

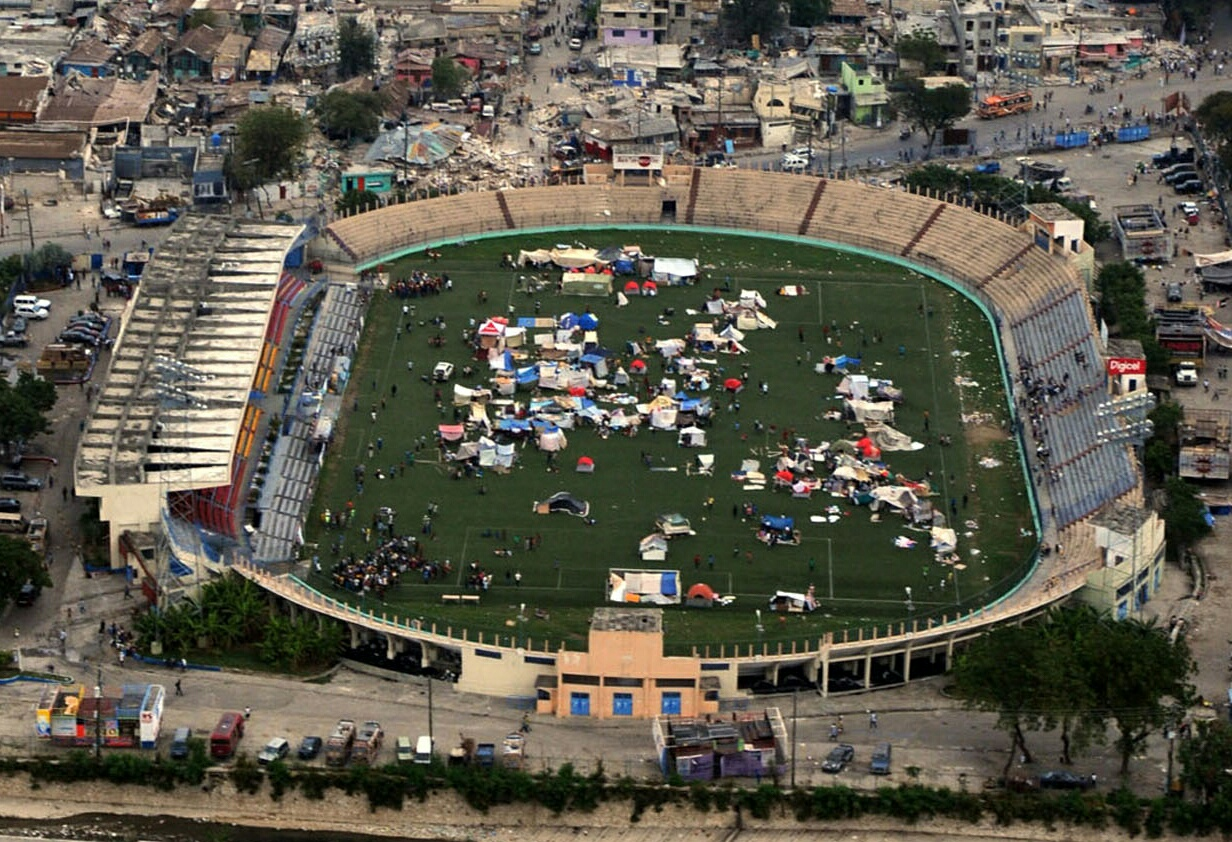
- Stade Sylvio Cator five days after the 2010 Haiti earthquake
- Interactive map of Stade Sylvio Cator
- Former names: Parc Leconte, Stade Paul-Magloire
- Address: Rue Oswald Durand; Port-au-Prince; Haiti
- Coordinates: 18°32′10″N 72°20′33″W
- Owner: Fédération Haïtienne de Football
- Capacity: 10,500 (international matches), 20,000 (domestic matches)
- Surface: Edel Grass (Artificial Turf)

Construction
- Opened: 1953

Tenant
- Haiti national football team

Stade Sylvio Cator (Haitian Creole: Estad Sylvio Cator, French: Stade Sylvio-Cator) is a multi-purpose stadium in Port-au-Prince, Haiti. It is currently used primarily for association football matches. The stadium has a synthetic pitch.

== History ==
The stadium bears the name of Haitian Olympic medalist and footballer Sylvio Cator. It was named after him in 1958. Before then the stadium was called the Parc Leconte (for President Cincinnatus Leconte). and then the Stade Paul-Magloire, for President Paul Magloire. It is where the Haiti national football team play its home games. It has hosted the 1973 CONCACAF Championship, where the home team were crowned as champions and the 1991 CONCACAF Women's Championship where the final match between the U.S. and Canada reached overcapacity of 30,000.

The stadium was partly destroyed by the earthquake in Haiti in January 2010, and a tent-city sprouted within its confines. Renovation work, funded by FIFA, was carried out over a period of four months, after which the stadium once again hosted the Haitian national team.

In 2024, the stadium fell under the control of local gangs, forcing the Haitian national team to play abroad in Curaçao. On 13 November 2026 during the Salvadoran military intervention in Haiti, a combination of Haitian and Salvadoran soldiers retook control of the stadium, with Salvadoran forces taking charge of security there for the time being. El Salvador's president Nayib Bukele reported that several human skulls and bones were found in the stadium.
