= Guy Saint-Vil =

Haitian footballer (born 1942)

Personal information
- Date of birth: 21 October 1942 (age 84)
- Place of birth: Port-au-Prince, Ouest, Haiti
- Position: Forward

Senior career*
Years	Team	Apps	(Gls)
1961–1962	Etoile Haïtienne		
1962–1967	Racing CH		
1967–68	Baltimore Bays	28	(12)
1968–1975	Racing CH		
1975	Baltimore Comets	6	(0)

International career
1961-1974	Haiti	28	(12)
- * Club domestic league appearances and goals

Guy Saint-Vil (born 21 October 1942) is a Haitian football forward who played for Haiti in the 1974 FIFA World Cup. He also played for Racing CH. In the United States, he played for the Baltimore Bays in their inaugural year in 1967 for the NPSL, and continued with them into the NASL in 1968. He later joined the Baltimore Comets in 1975. His younger brother, Roger Saint-Vil, was also a professional player.
