= 1973 CONCACAF Championship =

Coupe des nations de la CONCACAF 1973

Tournament details
- Host country: Haiti
- Dates: 29 November – 18 December
- Teams: 6 (from 1 confederation)
- Venue: 1 (in 1 host city)

Final positions
- Champions: Haiti (1st title)
- Runners-up: Trinidad and Tobago
- Third place: Mexico
- Fourth place: Honduras

Tournament statistics
- Matches played: 15
- Goals scored: 43 (2.87 per match)
- Attendance: 223,442 (14,896 per match)
- Top scorer: (Trinidad and Tobago) Steve David (7 goals)

The 1973 CONCACAF Championship, the sixth edition of the CONCACAF Championship, was held in Haiti from 29 November to 18 December. All matches were played at Stade Sylvio Cator in Port-au-Prince. This is the first edition to double as qualification for the World Cup. Haiti became winners for the first time in the CONCACAF region and qualified for West Germany '74. The North, Central American and Caribbean zone was allocated 1 place (out of 16) in the World Cup.

== Controversy ==
In quite a controversial match, Haiti defeated Trinidad and Tobago 2–1, with the referee disallowing four Trinidad and Tobago goals. As a result, referee Jose Roberto Henriquez and linesman James Higuet received lifetime bans from FIFA for their actions during the match.

There has been speculation that there might have been some collusion in favour of Haiti, due to the tournament taking place there during the military dictatorship of Jean-Claude Duvalier in a pivotal tournament that would send the winner to the 1974 FIFA World Cup. However, at the time, this was just the team’s second match of a round-robin tournament, having already won its first at the score of 3–0 against the Netherlands Antilles with no such known controversy as well as the matches that followed.

== Teams ==
- Guatemala
- Haiti (Hosts)
- Honduras
- Mexico (Defending Champions)
- Netherlands Antilles
- Trinidad and Tobago

== Venues ==
Location of the host city of the 1973 CONCACAF Championship.	Port-au-Prince
Location of the host city of the 1973 CONCACAF Championship.	Stade Sylvio Cator
Location of the host city of the 1973 CONCACAF Championship.	Capacity: 15,000

== Results ==
Pos	Team	Pld	W	D	L	GF	GA	GD	Pts	Qualification
1	Haiti (C)	5	4	0	1	8	3	+5	8	1974 FIFA World Cup
2	Trinidad and Tobago	5	3	0	2	11	4	+7	6	
3	Mexico	5	2	2	1	10	5	+5	6	
4	Honduras	5	1	3	1	6	6	0	5	
5	Guatemala	5	0	3	2	4	6	−2	3	
6	Netherlands Antilles	5	0	2	3	4	19	−15	2	

Rules for classification: 1) Points; 2) Goal difference; 3) Number of goals scored;
(C) Champions
29 November 1973

Honduras	2–1	Trinidad and Tobago
Guifarro 33'; Hernández 51'		David 61'

Stade Sylvio Cator, Port-au-Prince
Attendance: 12,816
Referee: Davies (Canada)

30 November 1973

Mexico	0–0	Guatemala

Stade Sylvio Cator, Port-au-Prince
Attendance: 12,816
Referee: Highet (Canada)

1 December 1973

Haiti	3–0	Netherlands Antilles
Sanon 25', 61'; Désir 29'

Stade Sylvio Cator, Port-au-Prince
Attendance: 12,816
Referee: Soto Paris (Costa Rica)

3 December 1973

Honduras	1–1	Mexico
Guifarro 54'		H. López 73'

Stade Sylvio Cator, Port-au-Prince
Attendance: 12,816
Referee: Winsemann (Canada)

4 December 1973

Haiti	2–1	Trinidad and Tobago
Sanon 9'; R. Saint-Vil 88'		David 14'

Stade Sylvio Cator, Port-au-Prince
Attendance: 12,816
Referee: Henriquez (El Salvador)

5 December 1973

Netherlands Antilles	2–2	Guatemala
Toppenberg 18'; Schoop 75'		Roldán 6'; Morales 63'

Stade Sylvio Cator, Port-au-Prince
Attendance: 14,257
Referee: Kibritjian (United States)

7 December 1973

Haiti	1–0	Honduras
G. Saint-Vil 59'

Stade Sylvio Cator, Port-au-Prince
Attendance: 14,257
Referee: Winsemann (Canada)

8 December 1973

Mexico	8–0	Netherlands Antilles
H. López 10', 76'; Muciño 32', 45', 46', 82'; Pulido 35'; Lapuente 78'

Stade Sylvio Cator, Port-au-Prince
Attendance: 14,257
Referee: Luis Siles Calderón (Costa Rica)

10 December 1973

Trinidad and Tobago	1–0	Guatemala
David 30'

Stade Sylvio Cator, Port-au-Prince
Attendance: 15,361
Referee: Soto Paris (Costa Rica)

12 December 1973

Honduras	2–2	Netherlands Antilles
Soza 33'; Guifarro 50'		Clemencia 62'; St. Jago 73'

Stade Sylvio Cator, Port-au-Prince
Attendance: 15,361
Referee: Chaplin (Jamaica)

13 December 1973

Haiti	2–1	Guatemala
Sanon 28', 72'		Monterroso 4'

Stade Sylvio Cator, Port-au-Prince
Attendance: 15,361
Referee: Davies (Canada)

14 December 1973

Trinidad and Tobago	4–0	Mexico
Cummings 35', 39'; David 52'; Archibald 62'

Stade Sylvio Cator, Port-au-Prince
Attendance: 15,361
Referee: Winsemann (Canada)

15 December 1973

Honduras	1–1	Guatemala
Bran 15'		Banegas 83'

Stade Sylvio Cator, Port-au-Prince
Attendance: 15,435
Referee: Schott (United States)

17 December 1973

Trinidad and Tobago	4–0	Netherlands Antilles
David 16', 51', 62'; Brunken 33' (o.g.)

Stade Sylvio Cator, Port-au-Prince
Attendance: 17,358
Referee: Ramirez (Puerto Rico)

18 December 1973

Haiti	0–1	Mexico
		Borja 30'

Stade Sylvio Cator, Port-au-Prince
Attendance: 22,354
Referee: Kibritjian (United States)

Haiti qualified for the 1974 FIFA World Cup.

1973 CONCACAF Championship Winners
Haiti
First title

== Goalscorers ==
7 goals

- (Trinidad and Tobago) Steve David

5 goals

- (Haiti) Emmanuel Sanon

4 goals

- (Mexico) Octavio Muciño

3 goals

- (Honduras) Rubén Guifarro
- (Mexico) Horacio López Salgado

2 goals

- (Trinidad and Tobago) Everald Cummings

1 goal

- (Guatemala) Juan Banegas
- (Guatemala) Benjamín Monterroso
- (Guatemala) René Morales
- (Guatemala) Jorge Roldán
- (Haiti) Jean-Claude Désir
- (Haiti) Guy Saint-Vil
- (Haiti) Roger Saint-Vil
- (Honduras) Jorge Alberto Bran Guevara
- (Honduras) Óscar Rolando Hernández
- (Honduras) Roberto Soza
- (Mexico) Enrique Borja
- (Mexico) Manuel Lapuente
- (Mexico) Héctor Pulido
- (Netherlands Antilles) Rignald Alfonso Clemencia
- (Netherlands Antilles) Adelbert Toppenberg
- (Netherlands Antilles) Siegfried Schoop
- (Netherlands Antilles) Erroll Maximino St. Jago
- (Trinidad and Tobago) Warren Archibald

1 own goal

- (Netherlands Antilles) Siegfried Brunken (playing against Trinidad and Tobago)

== See also ==
- 1974 FIFA World Cup qualification
- 1974 FIFA World Cup qualification (CONMEBOL)
- 1974 FIFA World Cup qualification (CAF)
- 1974 FIFA World Cup qualification (AFC and OFC)
- 1974 FIFA World Cup qualification (UEFA)
