= CONCACAF Championship =

Football tournament

- Organizer(s): CONCACAF
- Founded: 1961; 65 years ago
- Abolished: 1989; 37 years ago
- Region: North America; Central America; Caribbean
- Teams: 5–9
- Qualifier for: FIFA World Cup
- Related competitions: CONCACAF Gold Cup
- Last champion(s): Costa Rica (3rd title)
- Most championships: Costa Rica; Mexico (3 titles each)

The CONCACAF Championship, also known as CONCACAF Nations Championship, was an association football competition organized by CONCACAF as its top continental tournament for men's senior national teams from North America, Central America and the Caribbean. The tournament was held from 1963 to 1989; it was the direct predecessor of the CONCACAF Gold Cup.

Prior to the founding of CONCACAF in 1961, the predecessor confederations (NAFC and CCCF) organized their top senior national team tournaments, NAFC Championship for North America (1947 and 1949), and CCCF Championship for Central America and the Caribbean (1941–1961) before the merged to form CONCACAF.

The inaugural edition was held in 1963 and was CONCACAF's first tournament for national teams. The competition retained its tournament format and was played on a biennial basis for a decade.

In 1973 the tournament became the qualifying tournament for the FIFA World Cup and was played on a quadrennial basis. The CONCACAF trophy was given to the team that ranked highest in the qualifying group. In 1985 and 1989, there was no host nation for the competition.

== Results ==
Ed.	Year	Hosts	Champions	Runners-up	Third place	Fourth place	Teams
1	1963	El Salvador	Costa Rica	El Salvador	Netherlands Antilles	Honduras	9
2	1965	Guatemala	Mexico	Guatemala	Costa Rica	El Salvador	6
3	1967	Honduras	Guatemala	Mexico	Honduras	Trinidad and Tobago	6
4	1969	Costa Rica	Costa Rica	Guatemala	Netherlands Antilles	Mexico	6
5	1971	Trinidad and Tobago	Mexico	Haiti	Costa Rica	Cuba	6
6	1973	Haiti	Haiti	Trinidad and Tobago	Mexico	Honduras	6
7	1977	Mexico	Mexico	Haiti	El Salvador	Canada	6
8	1981	Honduras	Honduras	El Salvador	Mexico	Canada	6
9	1985	North America	Canada	Honduras	Costa Rica	El Salvador	9
10	1989	North America	Costa Rica	United States	Trinidad and Tobago	Guatemala	5

== Performances ==
Team	Champions	Runners-up	Third place	Fourth place	Total
Mexico	3 (1965, 1971, 1977)	1 (1967)	2 (1973, 1981)	1 (1969)	7
Costa Rica	3 (1963, 1969, 1989)	–	3 (1965, 1971, 1985)	–	6
Guatemala	1 (1967)	2 (1965, 1969)	–	1 (1989)	4
Haiti	1 (1973)	2 (1971, 1977)	–	–	3
Honduras	1 (1981)	1 (1985)	1 (1967)	2 (1963, 1973)	5
Canada	1 (1985)	–	–	2 (1977, 1981)	3
El Salvador	–	2 (1963, 1981)	1 (1977)	2 (1965, 1985)	5
Trinidad and Tobago	–	1 (1973)	1 (1989)	1 (1967)	3
United States	–	1 (1989)	–	–	1
Netherlands Antilles	–	–	2 (1963, 1969)	–	2
Cuba	–	–	–	1 (1971)	1

Notes

Italic — Hosts

== Debut of teams ==
A total of 15 national teams participated in the competition:

Edition	Debuting teams	No.	Total
1963	Costa Rica, El Salvador, Guatemala, Honduras, Jamaica, Mexico, Nicaragua, Netherlands Antilles, Panama	9	9
1965	Haiti	1	10
1967	Trinidad and Tobago	1	11
1969	–	0	11
1971	Cuba	1	12
1973	–	0	12
1977	Canada, Suriname	2	14
1981	–	0	14
1985	United States	1	15
1989	–	0	15

== Records and statistics ==
=== Overall statistics by team ===
In this ranking 2 points are awarded for a win, 1 for a draw and 0 for a loss. As per statistical convention in football, matches decided in extra time are counted as wins and losses, while matches decided by penalty shoot-outs are counted as draws. Teams are ranked by total points, then by goal difference, then by goals scored.

Rank	Team	Part	Pld	W	D	L	GF	GA	Dif	Pts
1	Mexico	8	38	22	10	6	78	24	+54	54
2	Costa Rica	6	37	20	11	6	64	27	+37	51
3	Guatemala	8	39	15	12	12	58	40	+18	42
4	Honduras	6	35	12	12	11	42	41	+1	36
5	El Salvador	6	32	11	10	11	43	40	+3	32
6	Trinidad and Tobago	6	32	10	7	15	36	50	-14	27
7	Haiti	7	34	10	7	17	33	51	-18	27
8	Canada	3	18	8	7	3	24	18	+6	23
9	United States	2	12	6	4	2	10	6	+4	16
10	Netherlands Antilles	4	21	5	5	11	27	55	-28	15
11	Cuba	2	10	2	4	4	9	15	-6	8
12	Panama	1	4	1	2	1	8	4	+4	4
13	Suriname	2	9	0	1	8	8	26	-18	1
14	Nicaragua	2	9	0	1	8	5	27	-22	1
15	Jamaica	2	8	0	1	7	4	26	-22	1

=== Competitive records ===
Legend

- 1st – Champions
- 2nd – Runners-up
- 3rd – Third place
- 4th – Fourth place
- SF – Semifinals
- QF – Quarterfinals
- GS – Group stage
- Q – Qualified for upcoming tournament
- • – Did not qualify
- •× – Disqualified
- × – Did not enter / Withdrew / Banned
- – Hosts

For each tournament, the number of teams in each finals tournament are shown (in parentheses).

Team (15)	(El Salvador) 1963 (9)	(Guatemala) 1965 (6)	(Honduras) 1967 (6)	(Costa Rica) 1969 (6)	(Trinidad and Tobago) 1971 (6)	(Haiti) 1973 (6)	(Mexico) 1977 (6)	(Honduras) 1981 (6)	1985 (9)	1989 (5)	Times entered	Times qualified
Canada	×	×	×	×	×	•	4th	4th	1st	•	5	3
Costa Rica	1st	3rd	×	1st	3rd	•	•	•	3rd	1st	9	6
Cuba	×	×	•	×	4th	×	•	GS	×	•	5	2
El Salvador	2nd	4th	×	•×	×	•	3rd	2nd	GS	GS	7	6
Guatemala	GS	2nd	1st	2nd	•	GS	GS	•	GS	4th	10	8
Haiti	•	GS	GS	•×	2nd	1st	2nd	GS	GS	×	9	7
Honduras	4th	•	3rd	•×	GS	4th	•	1st	2nd	•	10	6
Jamaica	GS	×	•	GS	•	×	×	×	×	•	5	2
Mexico	GS	1st	2nd	4th	1st	3rd	1st	3rd	×	•×	8	8
Netherlands Antilles	3rd	GS	•	3rd	×	GS	•	•	•	•	8	4
Nicaragua	GS	•	GS	×	•	•	×	×	×	×	5	2
Panama	GS	×	•	•	×	×	•	•	•	•	7	1
Suriname	×	×	×	×	×	•	GS	•	GS	×	4	2
Trinidad and Tobago	×	×	4th	GS	GS	2nd	GS	•	GS	3rd	8	6
United States	×	×	×	•	×	•	•	•	GS	2nd	6	2
Team (15)	9	6	6	6	6	6	6	6	9	5	Times entered	Times qualified

== Top goalscorers ==
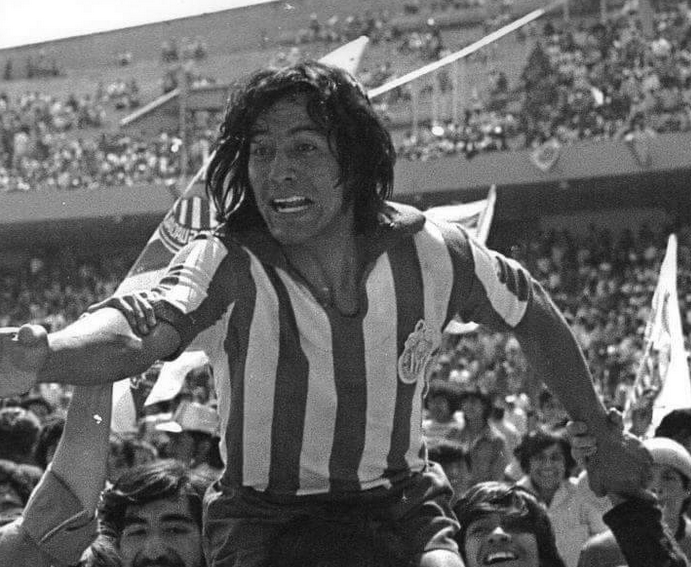
Octavio Muciño of Mexico is one of the two players to score four goals in CONCACAF Championship (1973)

Edition	Player	Goals
1963	(El Salvador) Eduardo Hernández	6
1965	(Mexico) Ernesto Cisneros	5
1967	(Guatemala) Manuel Recinos	4
1969	(Costa Rica) Victor Manuel Ruiz	4
1971	(Mexico) Roberto Rodríguez	4
1973	(Trinidad and Tobago) Steve David	7
1977	(Mexico) Víctor Rangel	6
1981	(Mexico) Hugo Sánchez	3
1985	(Honduras) Roberto Figueroa	5
1989	(Guatemala) Raúl Chacón (Guatemala) Julio Rodas (Costa Rica) Evaristo Coronado (Costa Rica) Juan Arnoldo Cayasso (Costa Rica) Leonidas Flores (Trinidad and Tobago) Leonson Lewis (Trinidad and Tobago) Kerry Jamerson (Trinidad and Tobago) Philibert Jones	2

=== Hat-tricks ===
CONCACAF Championship hat-tricks
Sequence	Player	Time of goals	For	Result	Against	Tournament	Round	Date
1.	Juan Gonzalez	17', 22', 72'	Costa Rica	4–1	El Salvador	1963	Final round	3 April 1963
2.	Javier Fragoso	57', 71', 85'	Mexico	5–0	Netherlands Antilles	1965	Final tournament	1 April 1965
3.	Raúl Arellano Gallo	36', 53', 85'	Mexico	4–0	Nicaragua	1967	Final tournament	6 March 1967
4.	Víctor Ruiz	?', ?', ?'	Costa Rica	5–0	Trinidad and Tobago	1969	Final tournament	4 December 1969
5.	Emmanuel Sanon	?', ?', ?',?'	Haiti	6–1	Trinidad and Tobago	1971	Final tournament	28 November 1971
6.	Octavio Muciño	32', 45', 46', 82'	Mexico	8–0	Netherlands Antilles	1973	Final round	8 December 1973
7.	Steve David	15', 51', 62'	Trinidad and Tobago	4–0	Netherlands Antilles	1973	Final round	17 December 1973
8.	Hugo Sánchez	46', 70', 82'	Mexico	4–1	Haiti	1977	Final round	9 September 1977

== Winning managers ==
Edition	Manager	Nation	Source
1963	(Costa Rica) Mario Cordero	Costa Rica	
1965	(Mexico) Ignacio Trelles	Mexico	
1967	(Uruguay) Rubén Amorín	Guatemala	
1969	(Spain) Eduardo Viso Abella	Costa Rica	
1971	(Mexico) Javier de la Torre	Mexico	
1973	(Haiti) Antoine Tassy	Haiti	
1977	(Mexico) José Antonio Roca	Mexico	
1981	(Honduras) José de la Paz Herrera	Honduras	
1985	(England) Tony Waiters	Canada	
1989	(Costa Rica) Marvin Rodríguez	Costa Rica	

== Hosts and defending champions ==
=== Hosts ===
Time(s)	Nation	Edition(s)
2	Honduras	1967, 1981
1	El Salvador	1963
1	Guatemala	1965
1	Costa Rica	1969
1	Trinidad and Tobago	1971
1	Haiti	1973
1	Mexico	1977

=== Host results ===
Edition	Hosts	Result
1963	El Salvador	Runners-up
1965	Guatemala	Runners-up
1967	Honduras	Third place
1969	Costa Rica	Champions
1971	Trinidad and Tobago	Fifth place
1973	Haiti	Champions
1977	Mexico	Champions
1981	Honduras	Champions

=== Defending champions ===
Edition	Defending champions	Result
1965	Costa Rica	Third place
1967	Mexico	Runners-up
1969	Guatemala	Runners-up
1971	Costa Rica	Third place
1973	Mexico	Third place
1977	Haiti	Runners-up
1981	Mexico	Third place
1985	Honduras	Runners-up
1989	Canada	Did not qualify

== See also ==
- CONCACAF Gold Cup
- CONCACAF Nations League
- CONCACAF Cup
- NAFC Championship
- CCCF Championship
- Official site
