= Jamaica at the FIFA World Cup =

International football delegation

This is a record of Jamaica's results at the FIFA World Cup. The FIFA World Cup, sometimes called the Football World Cup or the Soccer World Cup, but usually referred to simply as the World Cup, is an international association football competition contested by the men's national teams of the members of Fédération Internationale de Football Association (FIFA), the sport's global governing body. The championship has been awarded every four years since the first tournament in 1930, except in 1942 and 1946, due to World War II.

The tournament consists of two parts, the qualification phase and the final phase (officially called the World Cup Finals). The qualification phase, which currently take place over the three years preceding the Finals, is used to determine which teams qualify for the Finals. The current format of the Finals involves 48 teams competing for the title, at venues within the host nation (or nations) over a period of about a month. The World Cup final is the most widely viewed sporting event in the world, with an estimated 715.1 million people watching the 2006 tournament final.

Jamaica has qualified for the finals of the FIFA World Cup once, playing in the 1998 tournament after they finished third in the final round of CONCACAF qualifying. Although they beat Japan 2–1 in their third and final group game, two earlier defeats meant they failed to progress to the round of 16.

== Overview ==
Jamaica's FIFA World Cup record										Qualification record					
Year	Round	Position	Pld	W	D*	L	GF	GA	Squad	Pld	W	D	L	GF	GA
(Uruguay) 1930	Did not enter									Declined participation					
(Kingdom of Italy) 1934	Did not enter									Declined participation					
(French Third Republic) 1938	Did not enter									Declined participation					
(Fourth Brazilian Republic) 1950	Did not enter									Declined participation					
(Switzerland) 1954	Did not enter									Declined participation					
(Sweden) 1958	Did not enter									Declined participation					
(Chile) 1962	Did not enter									Declined participation					
(England) 1966	Did not qualify									8	2	3	3	8	21
(Mexico) 1970	Did not qualify									4	0	0	4	2	11
(West Germany) 1974	Withdrew									Withdrew					
(Argentina) 1978	Did not qualify									2	0	0	2	1	5
(Spain) 1982	Did not enter									Declined participation					
(Mexico) 1986	Withdrew									Withdrew					
(Italy) 1990	Did not qualify									4	2	1	1	4	6
(United States) 1994	Did not qualify									8	2	3	3	9	11
(France) 1998	Group stage	22nd	3	1	0	2	3	9	Squad	20	11	6	3	24	15
(South Korea) (Japan) 2002	Did not qualify									16	6	2	8	14	18
(Germany) 2006	Did not qualify									8	2	5	1	11	6
(South Africa) 2010	Did not qualify									8	5	1	2	19	6
(Brazil) 2014	Did not qualify									16	3	6	7	14	19
(Russia) 2018	Did not qualify									8	2	1	5	6	21
(Qatar) 2022	Did not qualify									14	2	5	7	12	22
(Canada) (Mexico) (United States) 2026	Did not qualify									12	8	2	2	20	6
(Morocco) (Portugal) (Spain) 2030	To be determined									To be determined					
(Saudi Arabia) 2034	To be determined									To be determined					
Total	Group stage	1/25	3	1	0	2	3	9		116	37	33	46	124	161

== 1998 FIFA World Cup ==
In 1996, the Jamaican Football Federation hired Brazilian René Simões to take charge of the team. After comfortably getting through the second round, they finished top of their group in the third round to qualify through to the Hexagonal where the top three qualified through to the finals. A slow start in the finals saw the national team winless from the first four games of the final round. But 1–0 wins against El Salvador, Canada and Costa Rica gave the national team some hope with Deon Burton scoring the winning goal in two of those matches. After a 0–0 draw against Mexico, Jamaica secured their qualification with a 2–2 draw against El Salvador to make their first (and to date only) appearance at a World Cup with the following day being declared a national holiday.

=== Squad ===
Head coach: (Brazil) Renê Simões

No.	Pos.	Player	Date of birth (age)	Caps	Club
1	GK	Warren Barrett	9 July 1970 (aged 27)	128	(Jamaica) Violet Kickers
2	DF	Stephen Malcolm	2 May 1970 (aged 28)	62	(Jamaica) Seba United
3	MF	Chris Dawes	31 May 1974 (aged 24)		(Jamaica) Galaxy
4	DF	Linval Dixon	14 September 1971 (aged 26)	104	(Jamaica) Hazard
5	DF	Ian Goodison	21 November 1972 (aged 25)	55	(Jamaica) Olympic Gardens
6	MF	Fitzroy Simpson	26 February 1970 (aged 28)	23	(England) Portsmouth
7	MF	Peter Cargill	2 March 1964 (aged 34)	76	(Jamaica) Harbour View
8	FW	Marcus Gayle	27 September 1970 (aged 27)	5	(England) Wimbledon
9	FW	Andy Williams	23 September 1977 (aged 20)	25	(United States) Columbus Crew
10	FW	Walter Boyd	1 January 1972 (aged 26)	57	(Jamaica) Arnett Gardens
11	MF	Theodore Whitmore	5 August 1972 (aged 25)	76	(Jamaica) Seba United
12	DF	Dean Sewell	13 April 1972 (aged 26)	4	(Jamaica) Constant Spring
13	GK	Aaron Lawrence	11 August 1970 (aged 27)	17	(Jamaica) Reno
14	GK	Donovan Ricketts	7 June 1977 (aged 21)	0	(Jamaica) Wadadah
15	DF	Ricardo Gardner	25 September 1978 (aged 19)	34	(Jamaica) Harbour View
16	MF	Robbie Earle	27 January 1965 (aged 33)	8	(England) Wimbledon
17	FW	Onandi Lowe	2 December 1973 (aged 24)	30	(Jamaica) Harbour View
18	FW	Deon Burton	25 October 1976 (aged 21)	18	(England) Derby County
19	DF	Frank Sinclair	3 December 1971 (aged 26)	5	(England) Chelsea
20	MF	Darryl Powell	15 November 1971 (aged 26)	2	(England) Derby County
21	DF	Durrant Brown	8 July 1964 (aged 33)	125	(Jamaica) Wadadah
22	FW	Paul Hall	3 July 1972 (aged 25)	23	(England) Portsmouth

=== Group H table ===
Pos	Team	Pld	W	D	L	GF	GA	GD	Pts	Qualification
1	Argentina	3	3	0	0	7	0	+7	9	Advance to knockout stage
2	Croatia	3	2	0	1	4	2	+2	6	Advance to knockout stage
3	Jamaica	3	1	0	2	3	9	−6	3	
4	Japan	3	0	0	3	1	4	−3	0	

Source: FIFA

=== Jamaica vs. Croatia ===
14 June 1998
21:00

Jamaica	1–3	Croatia
Earle 45'	(Report)	Stanić 27'; Prosinečki 53'; Šuker 69'

Stade Félix-Bollaert, Lens
Attendance: 38,058
Referee: Vítor Melo Pereira (Portugal)

=== Argentina vs Jamaica ===
21 June 1998
17:30

Argentina	5–0	Jamaica
Ortega 31', 55'; Batistuta 72', 80', 82' (pen.)	Report

Parc des Princes, Paris
Attendance: 45,000
Referee: Rune Pedersen (Norway)

=== Japan vs Jamaica ===
26 June 1998
16:00

Japan	1–2	Jamaica
Nakayama 74'	Report	Whitmore 39', 54'

Stade Gerland, Lyon
Attendance: 39,100
Referee: Günter Benkö (Austria)

== Head-to-head record ==
Opponent	Pld	W	D	L	GF	GA	GD	Win %
Argentina	1	0	0	1	0	5	−5	0.00
Croatia	1	0	0	1	1	3	−2	0.00
Japan	1	1	0	0	2	1	+1	100.00
Total	3	1	0	2	3	9	−6	33.33

== Player records ==
=== Most appearances ===
Nine players were fielded in all three of Jamaica's FIFA World Cup matches in 1998, making them record World Cup players for their country.

Rank	Player	Matches
1	Walter Boyd	3
1	Deon Burton	3
1	Robbie Earle	3
1	Ricardo Gardner	3
1	Ian Goodison	3
1	Paul Hall	3
1	Fitzroy Simpson	3
1	Frank Sinclair	3
1	Theodore Whitmore	3

=== Goalscorers ===
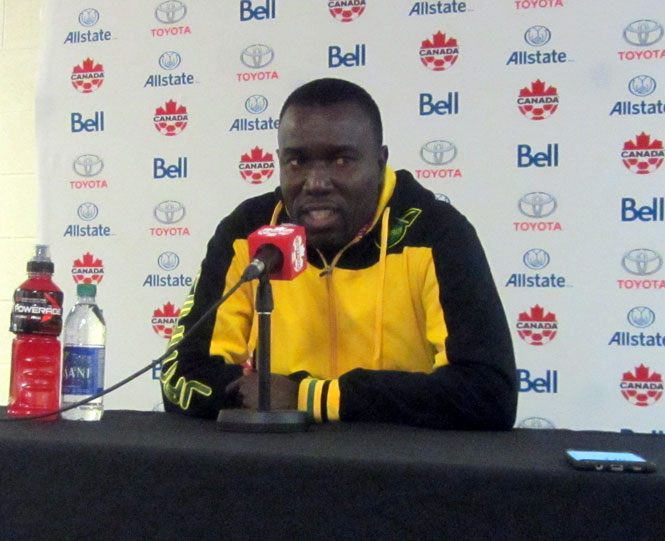
Jamaica's top World Cup scorer Theodore Whitmore

On 14 June 1998 Robbie Earle scored Jamaica's first ever FIFA World Cup goal, coming in their opening match against Croatia in Lens. Theodore Whitmore then scored two goals in Jamaica's only World Cup win, a 2–1 victory over Japan, making him Jamaica's top scorer at World Cup tournaments.

Player	Goals	1998
Theodore Whitmore	2	2
Robbie Earle	1	1
Total	3	3

== See also ==
- Jamaica at the CONCACAF Gold Cup
- Jamaica at the Copa América
- North, Central American and Caribbean nations at the FIFA World Cup
