= Adam Masalachi =

Ghanaian footballer

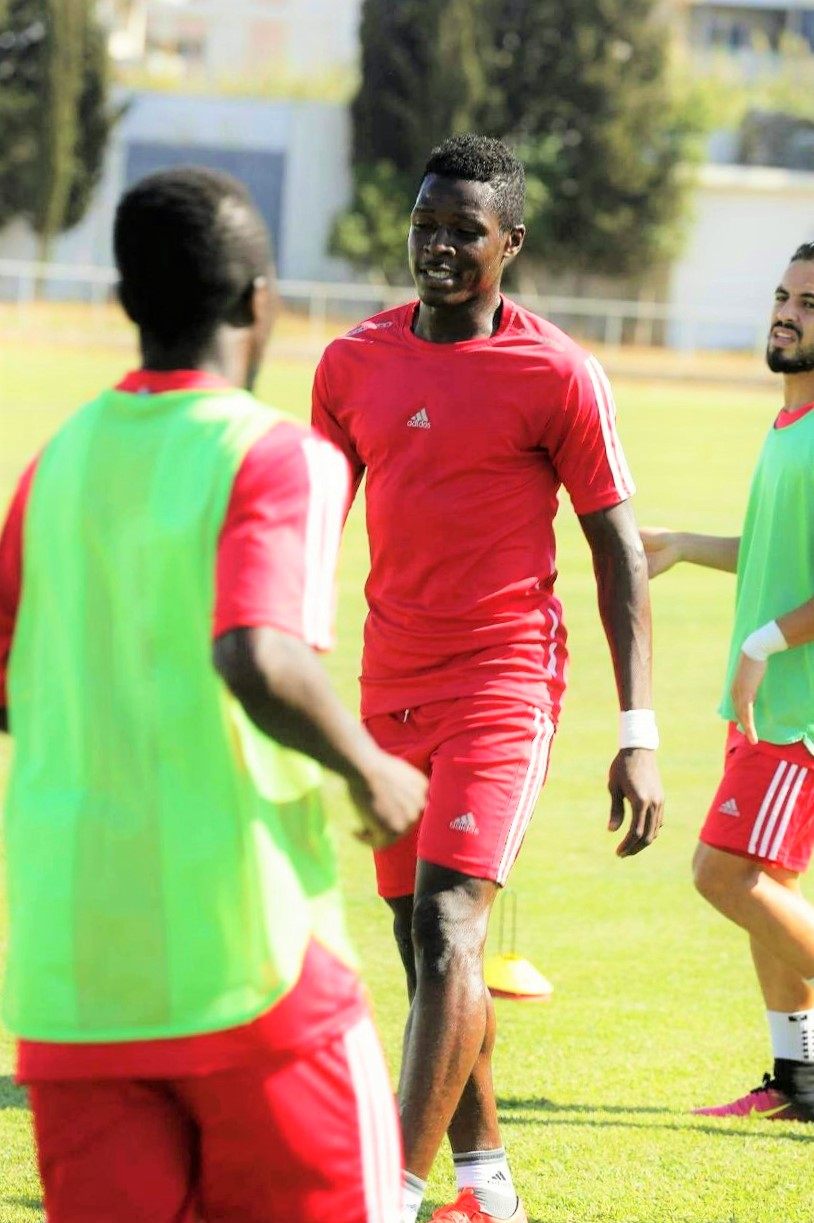

Personal information
- Date of birth: 3 January 1994 (age 32)
- Place of birth: Tamale, Northern Region, Ghana
- Height: 1.85 m (6 ft 1 in)
- Position: Centre back

Team information
- Current team: Suhul Shire

Youth career
- Galaxy FC

Senior career*
Years	Team	Apps	(Gls)
2011–2015	Steadfast	101	(10)
2015–2017	Egtmaeey Tripoli	60	(5)
2017–2018	Mekelle Kenema	15	(0)
2019	Futuro Kings		
2019–	Suhul Shire		
- * Club domestic league appearances and goals

Adam Masalachi (born 3 January 1994) is a Ghanaian professional footballer who plays for Ethiopian club Suhul Shire as a centre-back.

== Early life ==
Adam Masalachi was born in Sabonjida, a suburb of Tamale in the Northern Region of Ghana. As a child Masalachi played for an amateur team in Tamale known as Real Republicans F.C. In 2009, his team emerged third in the colts milo championship in Bolga. He also participated in S.H.S inter-school championship games in 2010 where their team emerged second in the tournament.

== Career ==
In 2011, Masalachi was signed by a 2nd division team Galaxy F.C. now Steadfast F.C. from the Republican F.C.. In his first participation in the tournament his defensive skills contributed to their team playing unbeaten in the 1st round and eventually qualifying for the Poly Tank division One League in Ghana. He scored 3 goals in the tournament.

Masalachi made his first debuts for Al Egtmaaey Tripoli SC (Lebanon Team) on the 25th of August 2015 and the game was against Salam Zgharta FC where he inspired Al Egtmaaey Tripoli FC to win 2–1. Masalachi played loan in his first season and secured a contract in the second round. He also helped the newly promoted team to secure a 6th position in the top flight of the Alpha Lebanese premier league.
