= Costa Rica at the FIFA World Cup =

International football delegation

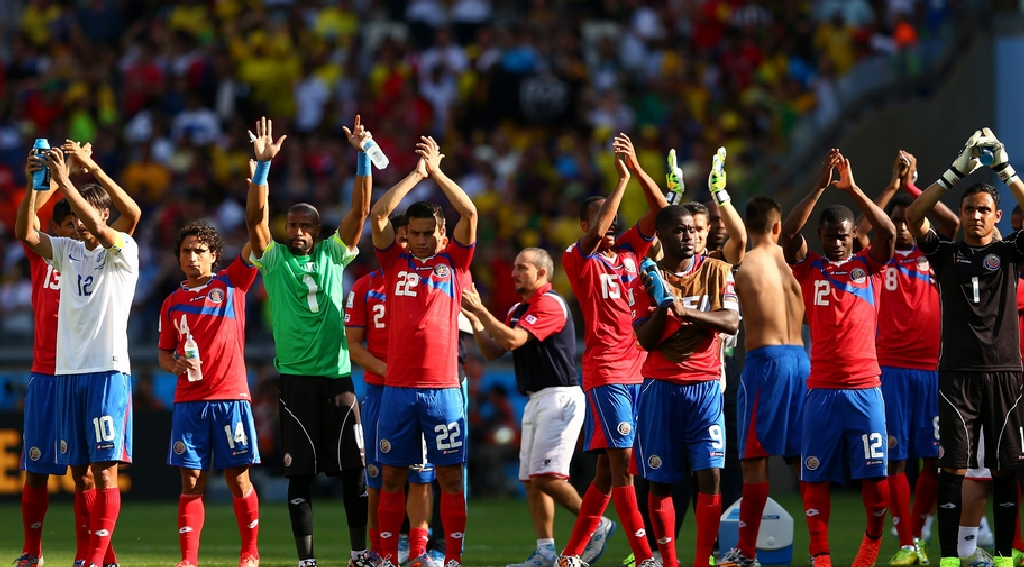
Costa Rica during the 2014 FIFA World Cup, where they achieved their best performance

This is a record of Costa Rica's results at the FIFA World Cup, an international association football competition contested by the men's national teams of the members of Fédération Internationale de Football Association (FIFA), the sport's global governing body. The championship has been awarded every four years since the first tournament in 1930, except in 1942 and 1946, due to World War II.

The Costa Rica national football team's history at the FIFA World Cup is relatively recent, as they missed the tournament for sixty years from its inception in 1930 until their first appearance at the 1990 FIFA World Cup, the team's only participation at the tournament in the 20th century. The 21st century has seen Costa Rica qualifying to most editions of the FIFA World Cup, with the exception of 2010, which they narrowly missed, and 2026.

In 2014, Costa Rica had its best performance at a FIFA World Cup. On 6 December 2013, Costa Rica was drawn into Group D with Uruguay, Italy, and England, the only group in FIFA World Cup history to feature three former world champions who, at the time, stood within the top 10 of the FIFA Men's World Ranking. Expectations for Costa Rica were overwhelmingly low, and that the team would finish in the thirty-second place. Instead, Costa Rica topped the group undefeated, with two victories and one draw, and only one goal received. After defeating Greece at the round of 16 through the penalty shoot-outs, and losing through the same means at the quarter-finals against the Netherlands, Costa Rica left the World Cup among the eight best teams, undefeated, and conceding only two goals, the least of all participants of the 2014 FIFA World Cup. Sports-news outlets such as Goal and Mundo Deportivo rank Costa Rica's performance in 2014 as one of the biggest surprises in FIFA World Cup history. Such a performance at the World Cup boosted Costa Rica's prestige in the international scene, as fifteen of the twenty-three players of the squad changed teams in the two transfer windows following the World Cup, including goalkeeper Keylor Navas signing for Real Madrid. Both the Costa Rican performance at the 2014 World Cup and Navas' subsequent, successful stint with Real Madrid had a significant impact on Costa Rican sports, economy, tourism, and society.

Costa Rica ranks third in FIFA World Cup appearances within the CONCACAF region, and first within the UNCAF subregion, in which they hold as many participations as the rest of Central America combined. Costa Rica remains the only Central American team to win a match at a World Cup, which they have done six times, and the only team within that region to qualify past the group stage, which they have done twice.

The Borges family, namely father Alexandre Guimarães and son Celso Borges, have accompanied Costa Rica through all the team's appearances at the FIFA World Cup. Guimarães participated as a player in 1990, then as a coach in 2002 and 2006, while Celso played in 2014, 2018, and 2022.

== Overall record ==
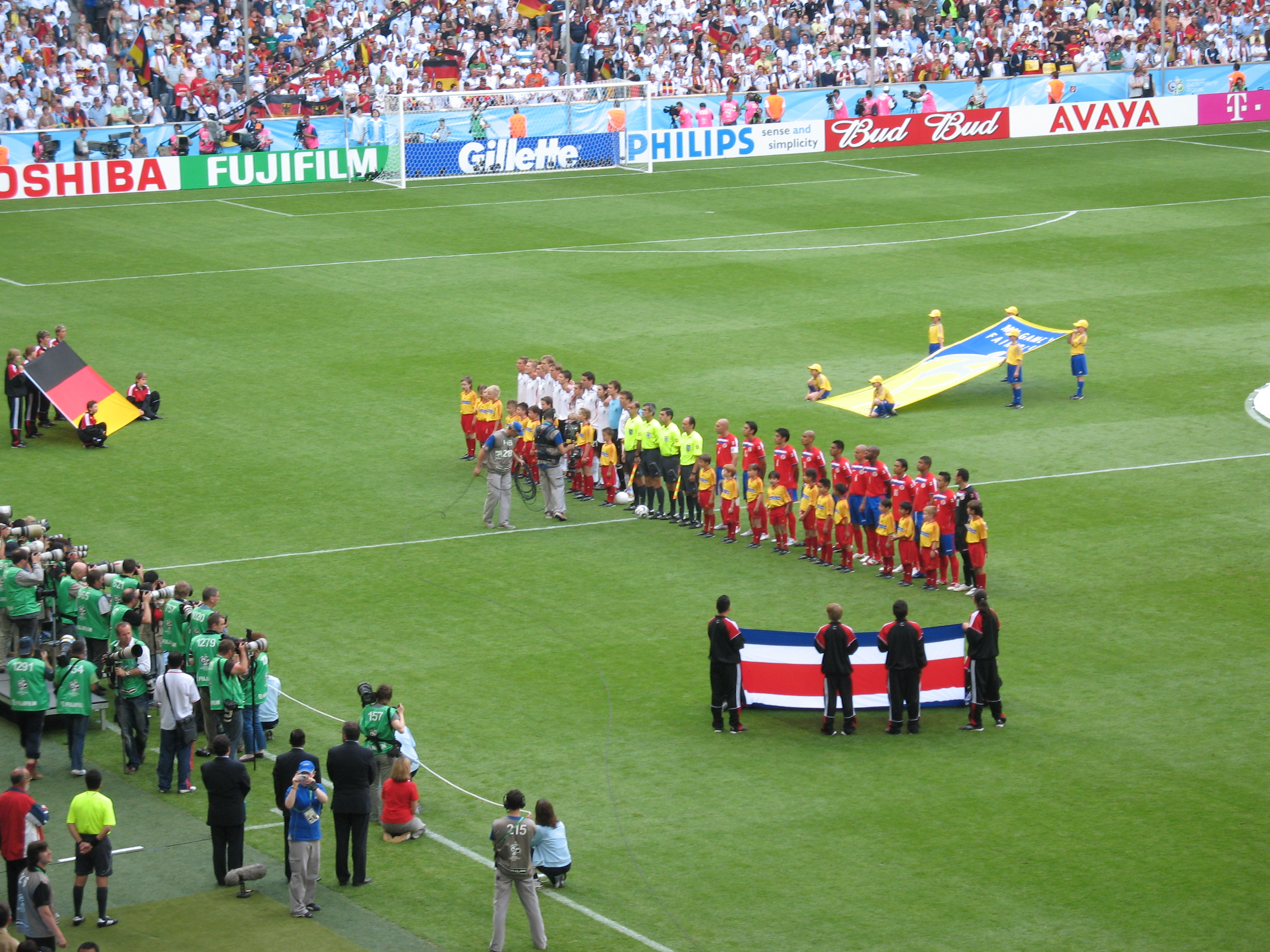
Costa Rica inaugurated the 2006 FIFA World Cup by playing against hosts Germany

FIFA World Cup record
Year	Round	Position	Pld	W	D*	L	GF	GA
(Uruguay) 1930	Did not enter							
(Italy) 1934	Did not enter							
(France) 1938	Did not enter							
(Brazil) 1950	Did not enter							
(Switzerland) 1954	Did not enter							
(Sweden) 1958	Did not qualify							
(Chile) 1962	Did not qualify							
(England) 1966	Did not qualify							
(Mexico) 1970	Did not qualify							
(West Germany) 1974	Did not qualify							
(Argentina) 1978	Did not qualify							
(Spain) 1982	Did not qualify							
(Mexico) 1986	Did not qualify							
(Italy) 1990	Round of 16	13th	4	2	0	2	4	6
(United States) 1994	Did not qualify							
(France) 1998	Did not qualify							
(South Korea) (Japan) 2002	Group stage	19th	3	1	1	1	5	6
(Germany) 2006	Group stage	31st	3	0	0	3	3	9
(South Africa) 2010	Did not qualify							
(Brazil) 2014	Quarter-finals	8th	5	2	3	0	5	2
(Russia) 2018	Group stage	29th	3	0	1	2	2	5
(Qatar) 2022	Group stage	27th	3	1	0	2	3	11
(Canada) (Mexico) (United States) 2026	Did not qualify							
(Morocco) (Portugal) (Spain) 2030	To be determined							
(Saudi Arabia) 2034	To be determined							
Total	Quarter-finals	6/23	21	6	5	10	22	39

*Denotes draws including knockout matches decided via penalty shoot-out.

== Head-to-head record ==
Opponent	Pld	W	D	L	GF	GA	GD	Win %
Brazil	3	0	0	3	2	8	−6	0.00
China	1	1	0	0	2	0	+2	100.00
Czechoslovakia	1	0	0	1	1	4	−3	0.00
Ecuador	1	0	0	1	0	3	−3	0.00
England	1	0	1	0	0	0	+0	0.00
Germany	2	0	0	2	4	8	−4	0.00
Greece	1	0	1	0	1	1	+0	0.00
Italy	1	1	0	0	1	0	+1	100.00
Japan	1	1	0	0	1	0	+1	100.00
Netherlands	1	0	1	0	0	0	+0	0.00
Poland	1	0	0	1	1	2	−1	0.00
Scotland	1	1	0	0	1	0	+1	100.00
Serbia	1	0	0	1	0	1	−1	0.00
Spain	1	0	0	1	0	7	−7	0.00
Sweden	1	1	0	0	2	1	+1	100.00
Switzerland	1	0	1	0	2	2	+0	0.00
Turkey	1	0	1	0	1	1	+0	0.00
Uruguay	1	1	0	0	3	1	+2	100.00
Total	21	6	5	10	22	39	−17	28.57

== Matches ==
=== 1990 FIFA World Cup ===
11 June 1990 Group Stage	Costa Rica	1–0	Scotland	Stadio Luigi Ferraris, Genoa
17:00	Cayasso 49'	Report		Attendance: 30,867; Referee: Juan Carlos Loustau (Argentina)

16 June 1990 Group Stage	Brazil	1–0	Costa Rica	Stadio Delle Alpi, Turin
17:00	Müller 33'	Report		Attendance: 58,007; Referee: Neji Jouini (Tunisia)

20 June 1990 Group Stage	Costa Rica	2–1	Sweden	Stadio Luigi Ferraris, Genoa
21:00	Flores 75'; Medford 88'	Report	Ekström 32'	Attendance: 30,223; Referee: Zoran Petrović (Yugoslavia)

23 June 1990 Round of 16	Czechoslovakia	4–1	Costa Rica	Stadio San Nicola, Bari
21:00	Skuhravý 12', 63', 82'; Kubík 75'	Report	González 54'	Attendance: 47,673; Referee: Siegfried Kirschen (East Germany)

=== 2002 FIFA World Cup ===
4 June 2002 Group Stage	Costa Rica	2–0	China	Gwangju, South Korea
15:30	Gómez 61'; Wright 65'	Report		Stadium: Gwangju World Cup Stadium; Attendance: 27,217; Referee: Kyros Vassaras (Greece)

9 June 2002 Group Stage	Costa Rica	1–1	Turkey	Incheon, South Korea
18:00	Parks 86'	Report	Belözoğlu 56'	Stadium: Incheon Munhak Stadium; Attendance: 42,299; Referee: Coffi Codjia (Benin)

13 June 2002 Group Stage	Costa Rica	2–5	Brazil	Suwon, South Korea
15:30	Wanchope 22'; Gómez 56'	Report	Ronaldo 10', 13'; Edmílson 38'; Rivaldo 62'; Júnior 64'	Stadium: Suwon World Cup Stadium; Attendance: 38,524; Referee: Gamal Al-Ghandour (Egypt)

=== 2006 FIFA World Cup ===
9 June 2006 Group Stage	Germany	4–2	Costa Rica	Munich
18:00	Lahm 6'; Klose 17', 61'; Frings 87'	Report	Wanchope 12', 73'	Stadium: FIFA WM Stadion München; Attendance: 66,000; Referee: Horacio Elizondo (Argentina)

15 June 2006 Group Stage	Ecuador	3–0	Costa Rica	Hamburg
15:00	C. Tenorio 8'; Delgado 54'; Kaviedes 90+2'	Report		Stadium: FIFA WM Stadion Hamburg; Attendance: 50,000; Referee: Coffi Codjia (Benin)

20 June 2006 Group Stage	Costa Rica	1–2	Poland	Hanover
16:00	Gómez 25'	Report	Bosacki 33', 65'	Stadium: FIFA WM Stadion Hannover; Attendance: 43,000; Referee: Shamsul Maidin (Singapore)

=== 2014 FIFA World Cup ===
14 June 2014 Group Stage	Uruguay	1–3	Costa Rica	Fortaleza, Brazil
16:00 UTC−3	Cavani 24' (pen.)	Report	Campbell 54'; Duarte 57'; Ureña 84'	Stadium: Estádio Castelão; Attendance: 58,679; Referee: Felix Brych (Germany)

20 June 2014 Group Stage	Italy	0–1	Costa Rica	Recife, Brazil
13:00 UTC−3		Report	Ruiz 44'	Stadium: Arena Pernambuco; Attendance: 40,285; Referee: Enrique Osses (Chile)

24 June 2014 Group Stage	Costa Rica	0–0	England	Belo Horizonte, Brazil
13:00 UTC−3		Report		Stadium: Estádio Mineirão; Attendance: 57,823; Referee: Djamel Haimoudi (Algeria)

29 June 2014 Round of 16	Costa Rica	1–1 (a.e.t.) (5–3 p)	Greece	Recife, Brazil
17:00	Ruiz 52'	Report	Papastathopoulos 90+1'	Stadium: Arena Pernambuco; Attendance: 41,242; Referee: Ben Williams (Australia)
	Penalties
	Borges (penalty scored); Ruiz (penalty scored); González (penalty scored); Campbell (penalty scored); Umaña (penalty scored)		(penalty scored) Mitroglou; (penalty scored) Christodoulopoulos; (penalty scored) Holebas; (penalty missed) Gekas

5 July 2014 Quarter-finals	Netherlands	0–0 (a.e.t.) (4–3 p)	Costa Rica	Salvador, Brazil
17:00		Report		Stadium: Arena Fonte Nova; Attendance: 51,179; Referee: Ravshan Irmatov (Uzbekistan)
	Penalties
	Van Persie (penalty scored); Robben (penalty scored); Sneijder (penalty scored); Kuyt (penalty scored)		(penalty scored) Borges; (penalty missed) Ruiz; (penalty scored) González; (penalty scored) Bolaños; (penalty missed) Umaña

=== 2018 FIFA World Cup ===
17 June 2018 Group Stage	Costa Rica	0–1	Serbia	Cosmos Arena, Samara
16:00 UTC+4		Report	Kolarov 56'	Attendance: 41,432; Referee: Malang Diedhiou (Senegal)

22 June 2018 Group Stage	Brazil	2–0	Costa Rica	Krestovsky Stadium, Saint Petersburg
15:00 UTC+3	Coutinho 90+1'; Neymar 90+7'	Report		Attendance: 64,468; Referee: Björn Kuipers (Netherlands)

27 June 2018 Group Stage	Switzerland	2–2	Costa Rica	Nizhny Novgorod Stadium, Nizhny Novgorod
21:00 UTC+3	Džemaili 31'; Drmić 88'	Report	Waston 56'; Sommer 90+3' (o.g.)	Attendance: 43,319; Referee: Clément Turpin (France)

=== 2022 FIFA World Cup ===
23 November 2022 Group Stage	Spain	7–0	Costa Rica	Doha, Qatar
19:00 AST (UTC+03:00)	Olmo 11'; Asensio 21'; F. Torres 31' (pen.), 54'; Gavi 74'; Soler 90'; Morata 90+2'	Report		Stadium: Al Thumama Stadium; Attendance: 40,013; Referee: Mohammed Abdulla Hassan Mohamed (United Arab Emirates)

27 November 2022 Group Stage	Japan	0–1	Costa Rica	Al Rayyan, Qatar
13:00 UTC+3		Report	Fuller 81'	Stadium: Ahmad bin Ali Stadium; Attendance: 41,479; Referee: Michael Oliver (England)

1 December 2022 Group Stage	Costa Rica	2–4	Germany	Al Khor, Qatar
20:00 UTC+1	Tejeda 58'; Vargas 70'	Report	Gnabry 10'; Havertz 73', 85'; Füllkrug 89'	Stadium: Al Bayt Stadium; Attendance: 67,054; Referee: Stéphanie Frappart (France)

== Player records ==
=== Most appearances ===
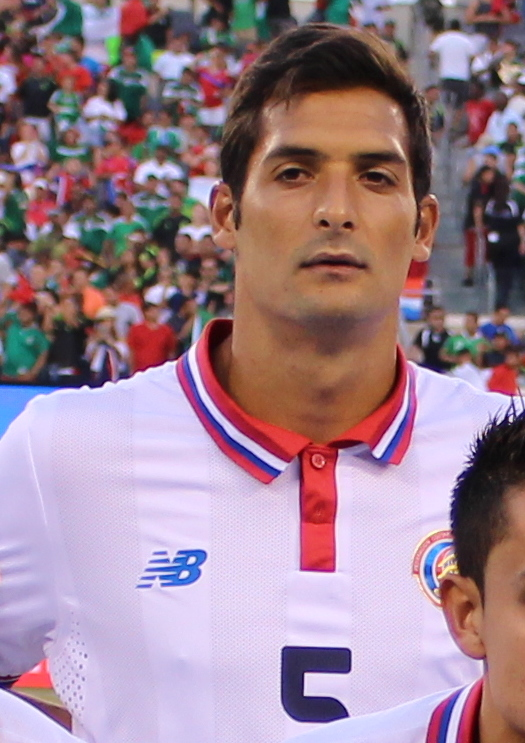
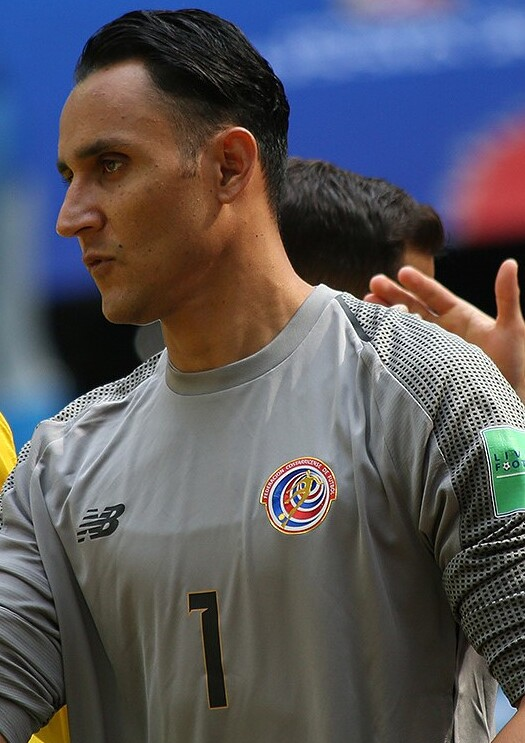
Celso Borges and Keylor Navas share the record for most matches played for Costa Rica at the FIFA World Cup.

Rank	Player	Matches	World Cups
1	Celso Borges	11	2014, 2018, and 2022
1	Keylor Navas	11	2014, 2018, and 2022
3	Joel Campbell	10	2014, 2018, and 2022
4	Christian Bolaños	9	2006, 2014, and 2018
4	Óscar Duarte	9	2014, 2018, and 2022
4	Bryan Ruiz	9	2014, 2018, and 2022
4	Yeltsin Tejeda	9	2014, 2018, and 2022
8	Cristian Gamboa	8	2014 and 2018
8	Giancarlo González	8	2014 and 2018
10	Michael Umaña	7	2006 and 2014

=== Goalscorers ===
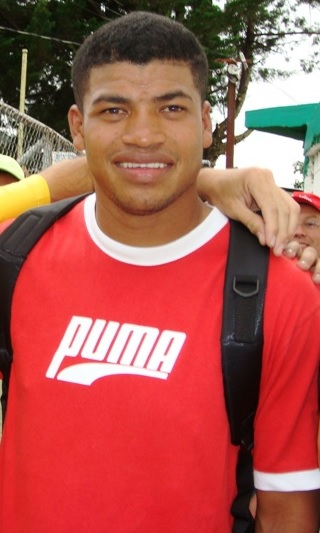
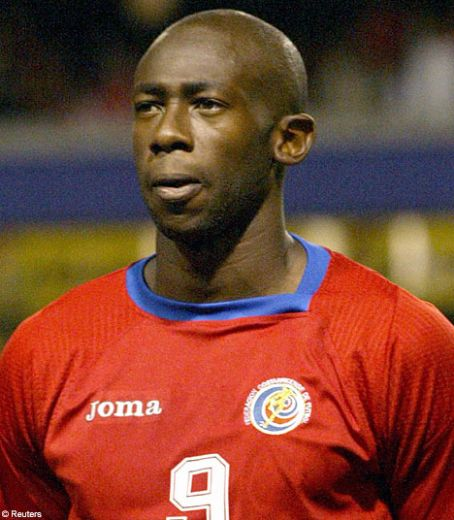
Rónald Gómez and Paulo Wanchope are the top goalscorers for Costa Rica at the FIFA World Cup.

Sixteen Costa Ricans have scored for the national team throughout their six participations at the FIFA World Cup.

Rank	Player	Goals	World Cups
1	Rónald Gómez	3	2002 (2) and 2006 (1)
1	Paulo Wanchope	3	2002 (2) and 2006 (1)
3	Bryan Ruiz	2	2014
4	Joel Campbell	1	2014
4	Juan Cayasso	1	1990
4	Óscar Duarte	1	2014
4	Róger Flores	1	1990
4	Keysher Fuller	1	2022
4	Rónald González	1	1990
4	Hernán Medford	1	1990
4	Winston Parks	1	2002
4	Yeltsin Tejeda	1	2022
4	Marco Ureña	1	2014
4	Juan Pablo Vargas	1	2022
4	Kendall Waston	1	2018
4	Mauricio Wright	1	2002

In addition to these players, Switzerland goalkeeper Yann Sommer scored an own goal for Costa Rica in 2018.

=== Squads ===
- 1990 FIFA World Cup squad
- 2002 FIFA World Cup squad
- 2006 FIFA World Cup squad
- 2014 FIFA World Cup squad
- 2018 FIFA World Cup squad
- 2022 FIFA World Cup squad

== Individual awards ==
- Golden Glove 1990: Luis Gabelo Conejo (shared)
- Player of the Match: Eight times.
  - 2002: Rónald Gómez (against China) and Paulo Wanchope (against Turkey)
  - 2014: Joel Campbell (against Uruguay), Keylor Navas (three times: against England, Greece, and the Netherlands), and Bryan Ruiz (against Italy)
  - 2022: Keysher Fuller (against Japan)

== See also ==
- Costa Rica at the CONCACAF Gold Cup
- Costa Rica at the Copa América
- North, Central American and Caribbean nations at the FIFA World Cup
