= Jamaica at the CONCACAF Gold Cup =

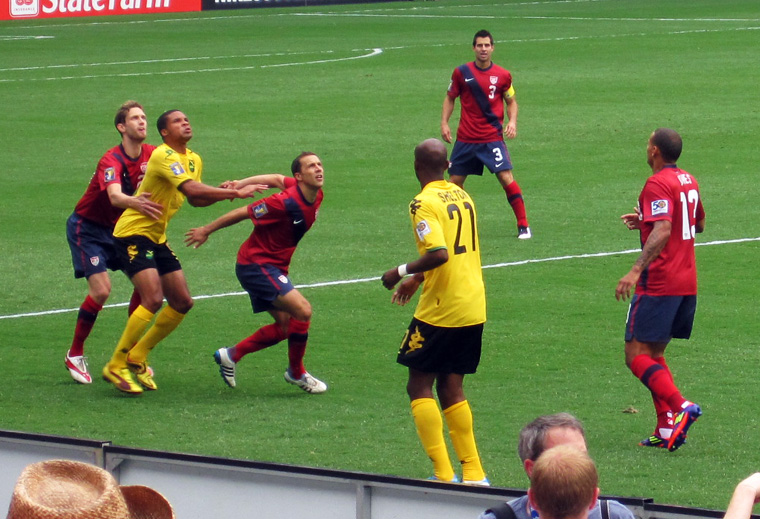
Playing scene from the 2011 quarter-final against the United States.

The CONCACAF Gold Cup is North America's major tournament in senior men's football and determines the continental champion. Until 1989, the tournament was known as CONCACAF Championship. It is currently held every two years. From 1996 to 2005, nations from other confederations have regularly joined the tournament as invitees. In earlier editions, the continental championship was held in different countries, but since the inception of the Gold Cup in 1991, the United States are constant hosts or co-hosts.

From 1973 to 1989, the tournament doubled as the confederation's World Cup qualification. CONCACAF's representative team at the FIFA Confederations Cup was decided by a play-off between the winners of the last two tournament editions, in the CONCACAF Cup, for 2017.

Since the inaugural tournament in 1963, the Gold Cup was held 28 times and has been won by seven different nations, most often by Mexico (13 titles).

Although Jamaica was one of the nine teams which participated in the inaugural 1963 CONCACAF Championship, they failed to make an impact on continental level all the way through the 1980s. Since the inception of the Gold Cup, however, they have been regular guests in the knockout stage, culminating in playing two consecutive finals in 2015 and 2017. They lost the matches 1–3 to Mexico and 1–2 to the United States, respectively.

== Overall record ==
| CONCACAF Championship & Gold Cup record | | | | | | | | | | Qualification record | | | | | |
| Year | Result | Position | Pld | W | D | L | GF | GA | Squad | Pld | W | D | L | GF | GA |
|---|---|---|---|---|---|---|---|---|---|---|---|---|---|---|---|
| (El Salvador) 1963 | Group stage | 8th | 3 | 0 | 0 | 3 | 1 | 16 | Squad | Qualified automatically | | | | | |
| (Guatemala) 1965 | Did not enter | | | | | | | | | Did not enter | | | | | |
| (Honduras) 1967 | Did not qualify | | | | | | | | | 4 | 1 | 2 | 1 | 4 | 4 |
| (Costa Rica) 1969 | Round-robin | 6th | 5 | 0 | 1 | 4 | 3 | 10 | Squad | 2 | 1 | 1 | 0 | 3 | 2 |
| (Trinidad and Tobago) 1971 | Did not qualify | | | | | | | | | 2 | 0 | 1 | 1 | 0 | 1 |
| (Haiti) 1973 | Did not enter | | | | | | | | | Did not enter | | | | | |
| (Mexico) 1977 | Withdrew | | | | | | | | | Withdrew | | | | | |
| (Honduras) 1981 | Did not enter | | | | | | | | | Did not enter | | | | | |
| 1985 | Withdrew | | | | | | | | | Withdrew | | | | | |
| 1989 | Did not qualify | | | | | | | | | 4 | 2 | 1 | 1 | 4 | 6 |
| (United States) 1991 | Group stage | 8th | 3 | 0 | 0 | 3 | 3 | 12 | Squad | 4 | 4 | 0 | 0 | 13 | 2 |
| (Mexico) (United States) 1993 | Third place | 3rd | 5 | 1 | 2 | 2 | 6 | 10 | Squad | 5 | 4 | 1 | 0 | 10 | 1 |
| (United States) 1996 | Did not qualify | | | | | | | | | 3 | 2 | 0 | 1 | 4 | 3 |
| (United States) 1998 | Fourth place | 4th | 5 | 2 | 1 | 2 | 5 | 4 | Squad | 7 | 5 | 2 | 0 | 18 | 5 |
| (United States) 2000 | Group stage | 12th | 2 | 0 | 0 | 2 | 0 | 3 | Squad | 5 | 5 | 0 | 0 | 12 | 4 |
| (United States) 2002 | Did not qualify | | | | | | | | | 3 | 2 | 0 | 1 | 4 | 3 |
| (United States) 2003 | Quarter-finals | 7th | 3 | 1 | 0 | 2 | 2 | 6 | Squad | 6 | 4 | 2 | 0 | 17 | 4 |
| (United States) 2005 | Quarter-finals | 8th | 4 | 1 | 1 | 2 | 8 | 10 | Squad | 10 | 8 | 2 | 0 | 38 | 5 |
| (United States) 2007 | Did not qualify | | | | | | | | | 3 | 2 | 0 | 1 | 7 | 2 |
| (United States) 2009 | Group stage | 10th | 3 | 1 | 0 | 2 | 1 | 2 | Squad | 5 | 4 | 1 | 0 | 11 | 2 |
| (United States) 2011 | Quarter-finals | 5th | 4 | 3 | 0 | 1 | 7 | 2 | Squad | 5 | 4 | 1 | 0 | 12 | 3 |
| (United States) 2013 | Did not qualify | | | | | | | | | 3 | 0 | 1 | 2 | 1 | 3 |
| (Canada) (United States) 2015 | Runners-up | 2nd | 6 | 4 | 1 | 1 | 8 | 6 | Squad | 4 | 2 | 2 | 0 | 6 | 1 |
| (United States) 2017 | Runners-up | 2nd | 6 | 3 | 2 | 1 | 7 | 4 | Squad | 4 | 2 | 1 | 1 | 7 | 5 |
| (Costa Rica) (Jamaica) (United States) 2019 | Semi-finals | 4th | 5 | 2 | 2 | 1 | 6 | 6 | Squad | 4 | 3 | 0 | 1 | 12 | 3 |
| (United States) 2021 | Quarter-finals | 7th | 4 | 2 | 0 | 2 | 4 | 3 | Squad | 6 | 5 | 1 | 0 | 21 | 1 |
| (Canada) (United States) 2023 | Semi-finals | 3rd | 5 | 3 | 1 | 1 | 11 | 5 | Squad | 4 | 1 | 3 | 0 | 7 | 5 |
| (Canada) (United States) 2025 | Group stage | 9th | 3 | 1 | 0 | 2 | 3 | 6 | Squad | 6 | 2 | 2 | 2 | 6 | 6 |
| Total | Runners-up | 16/28 | 66 | 24 | 11 | 31 | 75 | 105 | — | 99 | 63 | 24 | 12 | 217 | 71 |

== Match overview ==
| Tournament | Round | Opponent | Score | Venue |
|---|---|---|---|---|
| (El Salvador) 1963 | Group stage | Costa Rica | 0–6 | San Salvador |
| (El Salvador) 1963 | Group stage | Mexico | 0–8 | San Salvador |
| (El Salvador) 1963 | Group stage | Netherlands Antilles | 1–2 | San Salvador |
| (Costa Rica) 1969 | Final round | Costa Rica | 0–3 | San José |
| (Costa Rica) 1969 | Final round | Mexico | 0–2 | San José |
| (Costa Rica) 1969 | Final round | Trinidad and Tobago | 2–3 | San José |
| (Costa Rica) 1969 | Final round | Guatemala | 0–0 | San José |
| (Costa Rica) 1969 | Final round | Netherlands Antilles | 1–2 | San José |
| (United States) 1991 | Group stage | Mexico | 1–4 | Los Angeles |
| (United States) 1991 | Group stage | Honduras | 0–5 | Los Angeles |
| (United States) 1991 | Group stage | Canada | 2–3 | Los Angeles |
| (Mexico) (United States) 1993 | Group stage | United States | 0–1 | Dallas |
| (Mexico) (United States) 1993 | Group stage | Honduras | 3–1 | Dallas |
| (Mexico) (United States) 1993 | Group stage | Panama | 1–1 | Dallas |
| (Mexico) (United States) 1993 | Semi-finals | Mexico | 1–6 | Mexico City |
| (Mexico) (United States) 1993 | Third place match | Costa Rica | 1–1 (a.e.t.) | Mexico City |
| (United States) 1998 | Group stage | Brazil | 0–0 | Miami |
| (United States) 1998 | Group stage | Guatemala | 3–2 | Los Angeles |
| (United States) 1998 | Group stage | El Salvador | 2–0 | Los Angeles |
| (United States) 1998 | Semi-finals | Mexico | 0–1 (a.s.d.e.t.) | Los Angeles |
| (United States) 1998 | Third place match | Brazil | 0–1 | Los Angeles |
| (United States) 2000 | Group stage | Colombia | 0–1 | Miami |
| (United States) 2000 | Group stage | Honduras | 0–2 | Miami |
| (United States) (Mexico) 2003 | Group stage | Colombia | 0–1 | Miami |
| (United States) (Mexico) 2003 | Group stage | Guatemala | 2–0 | Miami |
| (United States) (Mexico) 2003 | Quarter-finals | Mexico | 0–5 | Mexico City |
| (United States) 2005 | Group stage | Guatemala | 4–3 | Carson |
| (United States) 2005 | Group stage | South Africa | 3–3 | Los Angeles |
| (United States) 2005 | Group stage | Mexico | 0–1 | Houston |
| (United States) 2005 | Quarter-finals | United States | 1–3 | Foxborough |
| (United States) 2009 | Group stage | Canada | 0–1 | Carson |
| (United States) 2009 | Group stage | Costa Rica | 0–1 | Columbus |
| (United States) 2009 | Group stage | El Salvador | 1–0 | Miami |
| (United States) 2011 | Group stage | Grenada | 4–0 | Carson |
| (United States) 2011 | Group stage | Guatemala | 2–0 | Miami |
| (United States) 2011 | Group stage | Honduras | 1–0 | Harrison |
| (United States) 2011 | Quarter-finals | United States | 0–2 | Washington, D.C. |
| (United States) (Canada) 2015 | Group stage | Costa Rica | 2–2 | Carson |
| (United States) (Canada) 2015 | Group stage | Canada | 1–0 | Houston |
| (United States) (Canada) 2015 | Group stage | El Salvador | 1–0 | Toronto |
| (United States) (Canada) 2015 | Quarter-finals | Haiti | 1–0 | Baltimore |
| (United States) (Canada) 2015 | Semi-finals | United States | 2–1 | Atlanta |
| (United States) (Canada) 2015 | Final | Mexico | 1–3 | Philadelphia |
| (United States) 2017 | Group stage | Curaçao | 2–0 | San Diego |
| (United States) 2017 | Group stage | Mexico | 0–0 | Denver |
| (United States) 2017 | Group stage | El Salvador | 1–1 | San Antonio |
| (United States) 2017 | Quarter-finals | Canada | 2–1 | Glendale |
| (United States) 2017 | Semi-finals | Mexico | 1–0 | Pasadena |
| (United States) 2017 | Final | United States | 1–2 | Santa Clara |
| (Costa Rica) (Jamaica) (United States) 2019 | Group stage | Honduras | 3–2 | Kingston |
| (Costa Rica) (Jamaica) (United States) 2019 | Group stage | El Salvador | 0–0 | Houston |
| (Costa Rica) (Jamaica) (United States) 2019 | Group stage | Curaçao | 1–1 | Los Angeles |
| (Costa Rica) (Jamaica) (United States) 2019 | Quarter-finals | Panama | 1–0 | Philadelphia |
| (Costa Rica) (Jamaica) (United States) 2019 | Semi-finals | United States | 1–3 | Nashville |
| (United States) 2021 | Group stage | Suriname | 2–0 | Orlando |
| (United States) 2021 | Group stage | Guadeloupe | 2–1 | Orlando |
| (United States) 2021 | Group stage | Costa Rica | 0–1 | Orlando |
| (United States) 2021 | Quarter-finals | United States | 0–1 | Arlington |
| (United States) (Canada) 2023 | Group stage | United States | 1–1 | Chicago |
| (United States) (Canada) 2023 | Group stage | Trinidad and Tobago | 4–1 | St. Louis |
| (United States) (Canada) 2023 | Group stage | Saint Kitts and Nevis | 5–0 | Santa Clara |
| (United States) (Canada) 2023 | Quarter-finals | Guatemala | 1–0 | Cincinnati |
| (United States) (Canada) 2023 | Semi-finals | Mexico | 0–3 | Paradise |
| (United States) (Canada) 2025 | Group stage | Guatemala | 0–1 | Carson |
| (United States) (Canada) 2025 | Group stage | Guadeloupe | 2–1 | San Jose |
| (United States) (Canada) 2025 | Group stage | Panama | 1–4 | Austin |

== Record players ==
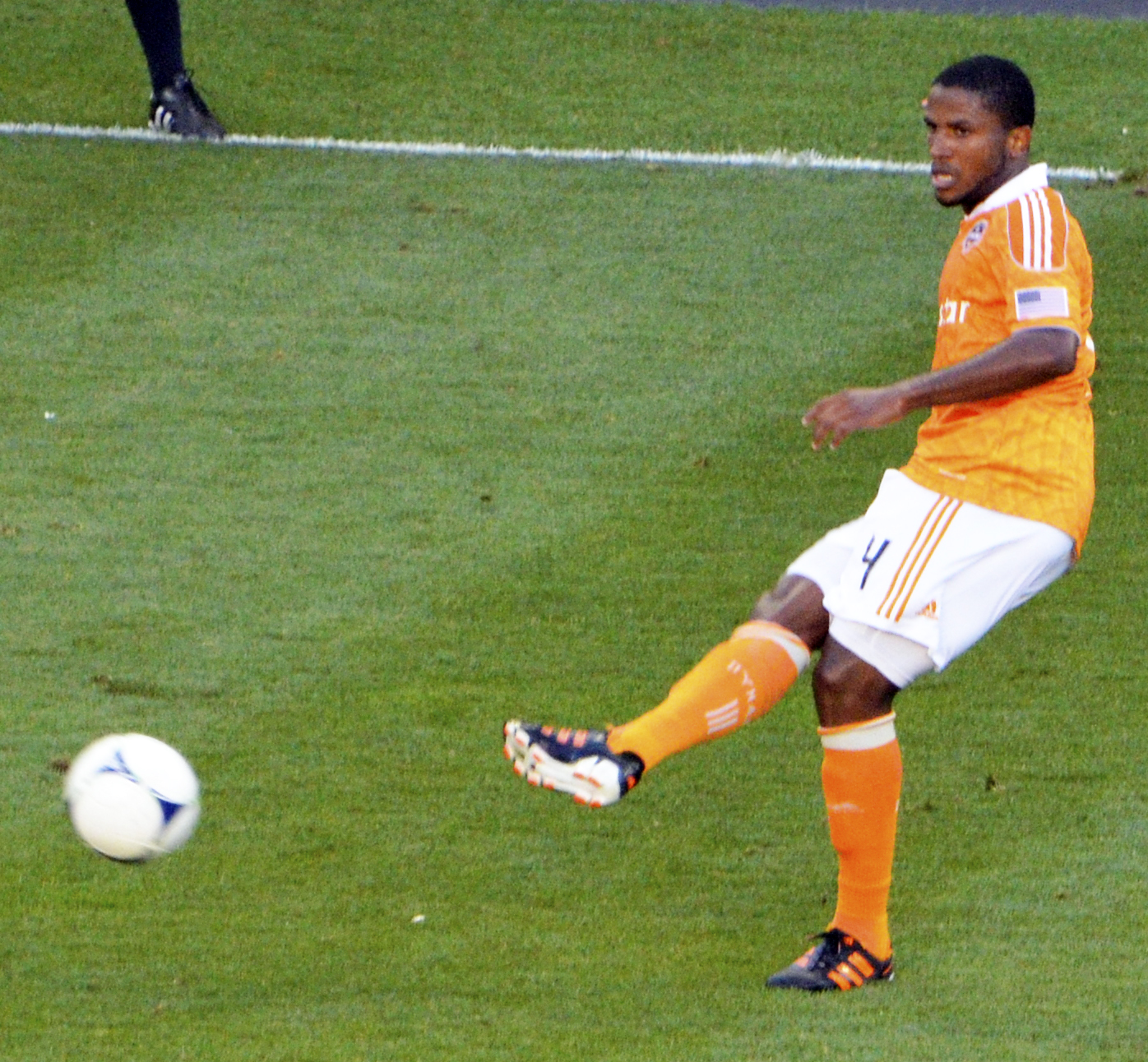
Defender Jermaine Taylor has been capped over 100 times for the Reggae Boyz. 16 of those matches were at the continental championships.

| Rank | Player | Matches | Gold Cups |
|---|---|---|---|
| 1 | Kemar Lawrence | 22 | 2015, 2017, 2019, 2021 and 2023 |
| 2 | Andre Blake | 21 | 2017, 2019, 2021, 2023 and 2025 |
| 3 | Damion Lowe | 19 | 2017, 2019, 2021, 2023 and 2025 |
| 4 | Je-Vaughn Watson | 17 | 2011, 2015, 2017 and 2019 |
| 5 | Jermaine Taylor | 16 | 2005, 2011, 2015 and 2017 |
| 6 | Alvas Powell | 15 | 2015, 2017, 2019 and 2021 |
| 7 | Darren Mattocks | 14 | 2015, 2017 and 2019 |
| 7 | Shamar Nicholson | 14 | 2017, 2019, 2021 and 2023 |
| 7 | Leon Bailey | 14 | 2019, 2021, 2023 and 2025 |
| 10 | Andy Williams | 13 | 1998, 2000, 2003 and 2005 |
| 10 | Cory Burke | 13 | 2017, 2021 and 2023 |

== Top goalscorers ==
Darren Mattocks is Jamaica's leading top scorer at continental championships, and scored in the 2015 final against Mexico.

| Rank | Player | Goals | Gold Cups |
|---|---|---|---|
| 1 | Darren Mattocks | 5 | 2015 (2), 2017 (2) and 2019 |
| 2 | Andy Williams | 3 | 1998, 2003 and 2005 |
| 2 | Demar Phillips | 3 | 2011 |
| 2 | Shamar Nicholson | 3 | 2019 (2) and 2021 |
| 5 | Roderick Reid | 2 | 1991 |
| 5 | Hector Wright | 2 | 1991 and 1993 |
| 5 | Devon Jarrett | 2 | 1993 |
| 5 | Paul Davis | 2 | 1993 |
| 5 | Paul Hall | 2 | 1998 |
| 5 | Ricardo Fuller | 2 | 2005 |
| 5 | Jermaine Hue | 2 | 2005 |
| 5 | Luton Shelton | 2 | 2005 and 2011 |
| 5 | Ryan Johnson | 2 | 2011 |
| 5 | Giles Barnes | 2 | 2015 |
| 5 | Garath McCleary | 2 | 2015 |
| 5 | Romario Williams | 2 | 2017 |
| 5 | Dever Orgill | 2 | 2019 |
| 5 | Damion Lowe | 2 | 2019 and 2023 |
| 5 | Cory Burke | 2 | 2021 and 2023 |
| 5 | Demarai Gray | 2 | 2023 |
| 5 | Leon Bailey | 2 | 2023 and 2025 |
| 5 | Amari'i Bell | 2 | 2023 and 2025 |
| 5 | Jon Russell | 2 | 2023 and 2025 |

== See also ==
- Jamaica at the Copa América
- Jamaica at the FIFA World Cup
