= Costa Rica at the Copa América =

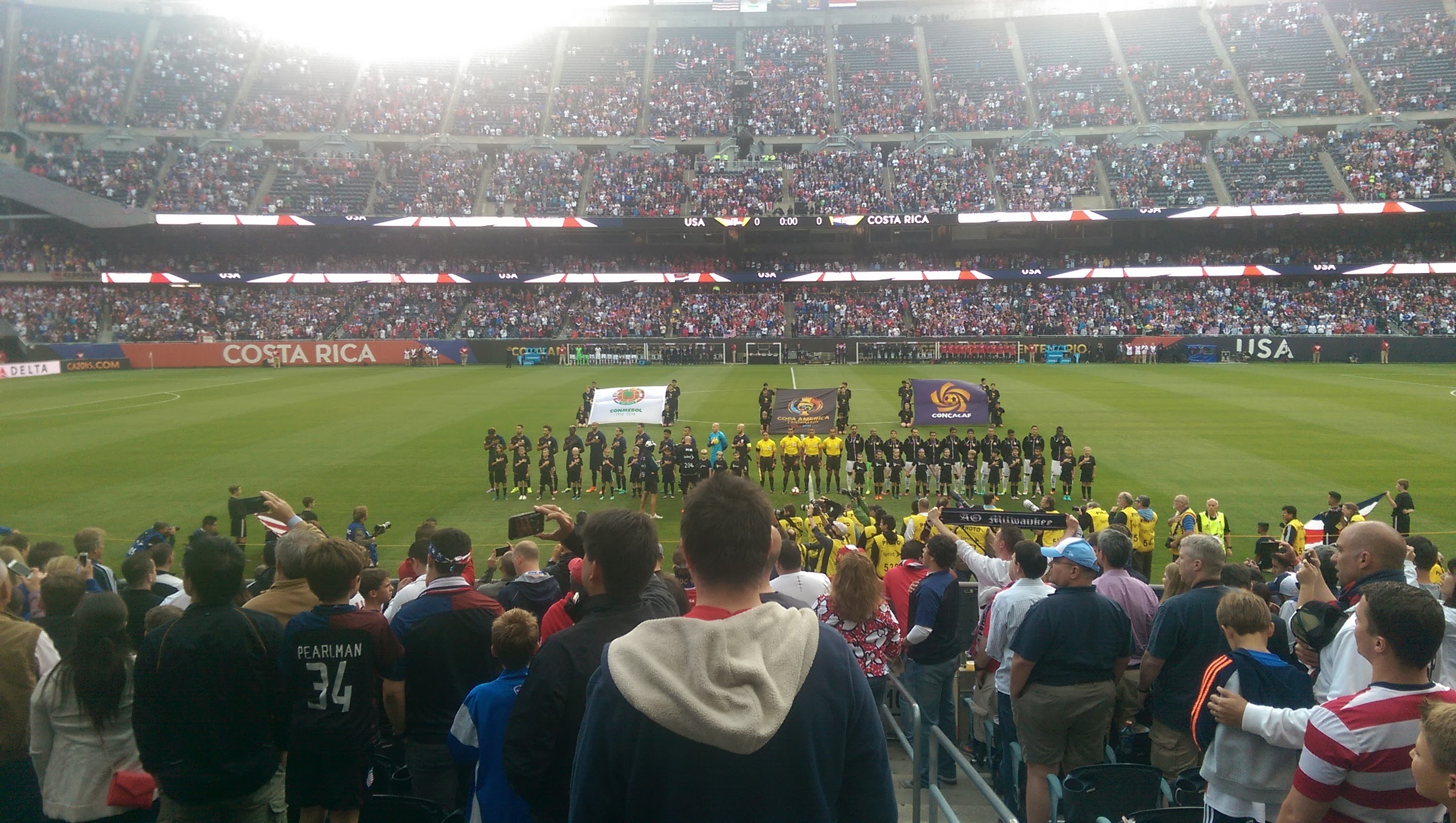
Costa Rica and the USA lining up for the group match at the Copa América Centenario.

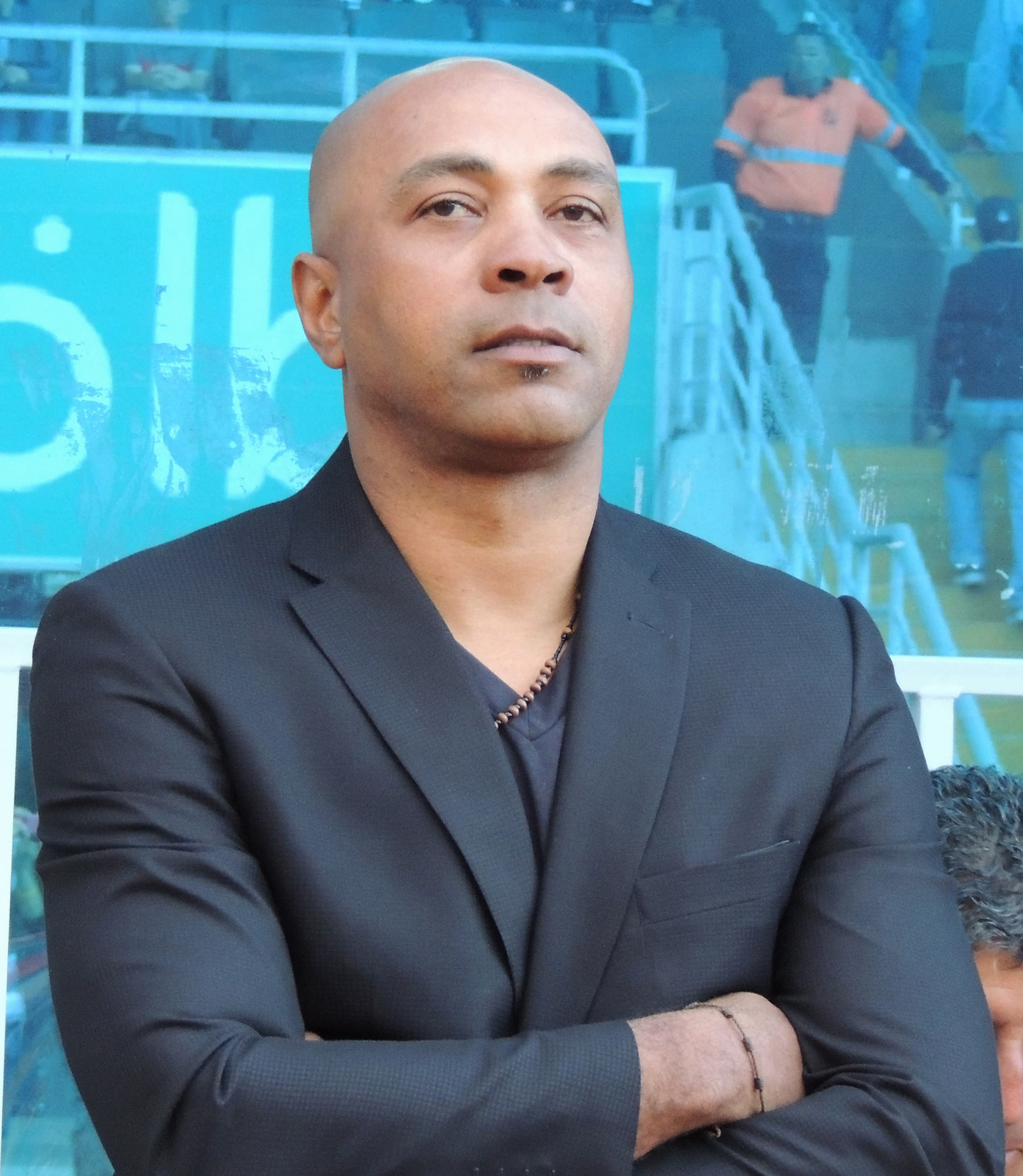
Mauricio Wright is the only Costa Rican player to score at two different Copa Américas.

The Copa América is South America's major tournament in senior men's football and determines the continental champion. Until 1967, the tournament was known as South American Championship. It is the oldest continental championship in the world.

Costa Rica are not members of the South American football confederation CONMEBOL. But because CONMEBOL only has ten member associations, guest nations have regularly been invited since 1993. Costa Rica have competed in the Copa América five times, and reached the quarter-finals twice.

On four occasions, they have been directly invited. The Copa América Centenario in 2016 was a collaboration of the CONCACAF and the CONMEBOL and Costa Rica qualified by virtue of winning the 2014 Copa Centroamericana. They again qualified for the 2024 tournament via the qualifying play-offs.

In their home confederation, the North American CONCACAF, Costa Rica have won three titles (1963, 1969 and 1989).

== Record at the Copa América ==
Copa América record
Year	Round	Position	Pld	W	D*	L	GF	GA
(Bolivia) 1997	Group stage	10th	3	0	1	2	2	10
(Colombia) 2001	Quarter-finals	5th	4	2	1	1	7	3
(Peru) 2004	Quarter-finals	8th	4	1	0	3	3	8
(Argentina) 2011	Group stage	9th	3	1	0	2	2	4
(United States) 2016	Group stage	10th	3	1	1	1	3	6
(United States) 2024	Group stage	10th	3	1	1	1	2	4
Total	Quarter-finals	6/13	20	6	4	10	19	35

* Draws include matches decided on penalties.

== Match overview ==
Tournament	Round	Opponent	Score	Venue
(Bolivia) 1997	Group stage	Brazil	0–5	Santa Cruz
(Bolivia) 1997	Group stage	Colombia	1–4	Santa Cruz
(Bolivia) 1997	Group stage	Mexico	1–1	Santa Cruz
(Colombia) 2001	Group stage	Honduras	1–0	Medellín
(Colombia) 2001	Group stage	Uruguay	1–1	Medellín
(Colombia) 2001	Group stage	Bolivia	4–0	Medellín
(Colombia) 2001	Quarter-finals	Uruguay	1–2	Armenia
(Peru) 2004	Group stage	Paraguay	0–1	Arequipa
(Peru) 2004	Group stage	Brazil	1–4	Arequipa
(Peru) 2004	Group stage	Chile	2–1	Tacna
(Peru) 2004	Quarter-finals	Colombia	0–2	Trujillo
(Argentina) 2011	Group stage	Colombia	0–1	Jujuy
(Argentina) 2011	Group stage	Bolivia	2–0	Jujuy
(Argentina) 2011	Group stage	Argentina	0–3	Córdoba
(United States) 2016	Group stage	Paraguay	0–0	Orlando
(United States) 2016	Group stage	United States	0–4	Chicago
(United States) 2016	Group stage	Colombia	3–2	Houston
(United States) 2024	Group stage	Brazil	0–0	Inglewood
(United States) 2024	Group stage	Colombia	0–3	Glendale
(United States) 2024	Group stage	Paraguay	2–1	Austin

== Record players ==
Rank	Player	Matches	Tournaments
1	Rónald Gómez	9	1997, 2001 and 2004
1	Joel Campbell	9	2011, 2016 and 2024
3	Steven Bryce	8	2001 and 2004
3	Walter Centeno	8	2001 and 2004
3	Luis Marín	8	2001 and 2004
3	Francisco Calvo	8	2011, 2016 and 2024
7	Mauricio Solís	7	1997 and 2001
7	Mauricio Wright	7	1997 and 2004
9	Jhonny Acosta	6	2011 and 2016
10	Six players	5	

== Top goalscorers ==
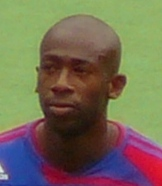
Paulo Wanchope scored five out of seven Costa Rican goals at their most successful Copa América run in 2001.

Rank	Player	Goals	Tournaments
1	Paulo Wanchope	5	2001
2	Mauricio Wright	2	1997 and 2004
3	Hernán Medford	1	1997
3	Steven Bryce	1	2001
3	Rolando Fonseca	1	2001
3	Andy Herron	1	2004
3	Luis Marín	1	2004
3	Joel Campbell	1	2011
3	Josué Martínez	1	2011
3	Celso Borges	1	2016
3	Johan Venegas	1	2016
3	Josimar Alcócer	1	2024
3	Francisco Calvo	1	2024

== See also ==
- Costa Rica at the CONCACAF Gold Cup
- Costa Rica at the FIFA World Cup
