= Costa Rica at the CONCACAF Gold Cup =

The CONCACAF Gold Cup is North America's major tournament in senior men's football and determines the continental champion. Until 1989, the tournament was known as CONCACAF Championship. It is currently held every two years. From 1996 to 2005, nations from other confederations have regularly joined the tournament as invitees. In earlier editions, the continental championship was held in different countries, but since the inception of the Gold Cup in 1991, the United States are constant hosts or co-hosts.

From 1973 to 1989, the tournament doubled as the confederation's World Cup qualification. CONCACAF's representative team at the FIFA Confederations Cup was decided by a play-off between the winners of the last two tournament editions in 2015 via the CONCACAF Cup, but was then discontinued along with the Confederations Cup.

Since the inaugural tournament in 1963, the Gold Cup was held 28 times and has been won by seven different nations, most often by Mexico (13 titles).

Costa Rica have won the inaugural CONCACAF Championship in 1963 and two more in 1969 and 1989. They are the third-most successful team behind CONCACAF's "big two", Mexico and the United States, both in terms of number of titles and ranking in the all-time table. Since 2000, they have reached the knockout stage eleven times in a row. Since the inception of the CONCACAF Gold Cup in 1991, Costa Rica only reached the final once, but were beaten 2–0 by the United States in 2002.

== Overall record ==
CONCACAF Championship & Gold Cup record										Qualification record					
Year	Result	Position	Pld	W	D*	L	GF	GA	Squad	Pld	W	D	L	GF	GA
(El Salvador) 1963	Champions	1st	6	5	1	0	14	2	Squad	Qualified automatically					
(Guatemala) 1965	Third place	3rd	5	2	2	1	11	4	Squad	Automatically entered					
(Honduras) 1967	Did not enter									Did not enter					
(Costa Rica) 1969	Champions	1st	5	4	1	0	13	2	Squad	Qualified as hosts					
(Trinidad and Tobago) 1971	Third place	3rd	5	2	1	2	6	5	Squad	Qualified as defending champions					
(Haiti) 1973	Did not qualify									2	0	1	1	4	5
(Mexico) 1977	Did not qualify									6	1	4	1	8	6
(Honduras) 1981	Did not qualify									8	1	4	3	6	10
1985	Third place	3rd	8	2	5	1	10	8	Squad	5	1	0	4	5	9
1989	Champions	1st	8	5	1	2	10	6	Squad	Qualified automatically					
(United States) 1991	Fourth place	4th	5	1	0	4	5	9	Squad	Qualified as defending champions					
(Mexico) (United States) 1993	Third place	3rd	5	1	3	1	6	5	Squad	5	4	0	1	11	2
(United States) 1996	Did not qualify									4	1	1	2	5	6
(United States) 1998	Group stage	5th	2	1	0	1	8	4	Squad	5	3	2	0	12	3
(United States) 2000	Quarter-finals	6th	3	0	2	1	5	6	Squad	5	3	0	2	13	3
(United States) 2002	Runners-up	2nd	5	3	1	1	8	5	Squad	5	2	2	1	8	5
(Mexico) (United States) 2003	Fourth place	4th	5	2	0	3	10	8	Squad	5	4	1	0	5	1
(United States) 2005	Quarter-finals	6th	4	2	1	1	6	4	Squad	4	3	1	0	8	2
(United States) 2007	Quarter-finals	7th	4	1	1	2	3	4	Squad	4	2	1	1	6	3
(United States) 2009	Semi-finals	4th	5	2	2	1	10	6	Squad	4	3	1	0	9	1
(United States) 2011	Quarter-finals	5th	4	1	2	1	8	6	Squad	4	1	2	1	5	4
(United States) 2013	Quarter-finals	5th	4	2	0	2	4	2	Squad	5	4	1	0	6	1
(Canada) (United States) 2015	Quarter-finals	7th	4	0	3	1	3	4	Squad	3	2	1	0	7	3
(United States) 2017	Semi-finals	4th	5	3	1	1	6	3	Squad	5	1	3	1	4	2
(Costa Rica) (Jamaica) (United States) 2019	Quarter-finals	5th	4	2	1	1	8	4	Squad	Qualified automatically					
(United States) 2021	Quarter-finals	5th	4	3	0	1	6	4	Squad	4	1	3	0	4	3
(Canada) (United States) 2023	Quarter-finals	7th	4	1	1	2	7	8	Squad	4	2	0	2	4	4
(Canada) (United States) 2025	Quarter-finals	7th	4	2	2	0	8	6	Squad	2	2	0	0	13	1
Total	3 Titles	23/28	108	47	31	30	175	115	—	84	40	28	16	138	65

== Winning tournaments ==
=== El Salvador 1963 ===
==== Squad ====
As follows. Head coach: (Costa Rica) Alfredo Piedra

No.	Pos.	Player	Date of birth (age)	Caps	Club
	GK	Asdrúbal Meneses			(Costa Rica) CS Cartaginés
	GK	Mario Pérez			(Costa Rica) Deportivo Saprissa
	GK	Emilio Sagot	26 February 1942 (aged 21)		(Costa Rica) Orión F.C.
	DF	Mario Cordero	7 April 1930 (aged 32)		(Costa Rica) Deportivo Saprissa
	DF	Guillermo Hernández			(Costa Rica) Deportivo Saprissa
	DF	Álvaro McDonald	1 January 1939 (aged 24)		(Costa Rica) CS Herediano
	DF	Rodolfo Madriz			(Costa Rica) CS Cartaginés
	DF	Giovanni Rodríguez			(Costa Rica) Deportivo Saprissa
	DF	Alex Sánchez	20 July 1930 (aged 32)		(Costa Rica) LD Alajuelense
	DF	Édgar Zúñiga			(Costa Rica) LD Alajuelense
	MF	Juan José Gámez	8 July 1939 (aged 23)		(Costa Rica) LD Alajuelense
	MF	Carlos Marín			(Costa Rica) CS Herediano
	MF	Édgar Quesada	16 August 1931 (aged 31)		(Costa Rica) CS Herediano
	MF	Wílliam Quirós			(Costa Rica) Deportivo Saprissa
	FW	Enrique Córdoba			(Costa Rica) CS Cartaginés
	FW	Héctor Coto			(Costa Rica) CS Cartaginés
	FW	Guillermo Elizondo			(Costa Rica) CS Uruguay de Coronado
	FW	Juan González			(Costa Rica) LD Alajuelense
	FW	Leonel Hernández	3 October 1943 (aged 19)		(Costa Rica) CS Cartaginés
	FW	Rubén Jiménez			(Costa Rica) Deportivo Saprissa
	FW	Edgar Marín	22 May 1943 (aged 19)		(Costa Rica) Deportivo Saprissa
	FW	Wálter Pearson			(Costa Rica) LD Alajuelense
	FW	Víctor Luis Vásquez			(Costa Rica) Deportivo Saprissa

==== First round ====
Rank	Team	Pts	Pld	W	D*	L	GF	GA	GD
1	Costa Rica	5	3	2	1	0	7	0	7
2	Netherlands Antilles	4	3	2	0	1	4	3	1
3	Mexico	3	3	1	1	1	9	2	7
4	Jamaica	0	3	0	0	3	1	16	−15

Results

24 March 1963

Costa Rica	6–0	Jamaica

Estadio Óscar Quiteño, Santa Ana

28 March 1963

Costa Rica	1–0	Netherlands Antilles

Estadio Óscar Quiteño, Santa Ana

30 March 1963

Costa Rica	0–0	Mexico

Estadio Óscar Quiteño, Santa Ana

==== Final round ====
Rank	Team	Pts	Pld	W	D*	L	GF	GA	GD
1	Costa Rica	6	3	3	0	0	7	2	5
2	El Salvador	4	3	2	0	1	7	6	1
3	Netherlands Antilles	2	3	1	0	2	6	5	1
4	Honduras	0	3	0	0	3	2	9	−7

3 April 1963

Costa Rica	1–0	Netherlands Antilles
Pearson

Estadio Flor Blanca, San Salvador

5 April 1963

Costa Rica	2–1	Honduras
Córdoba; Jiménez		Guerra

Estadio Flor Blanca, San Salvador

7 April 1963

El Salvador	1–4	Costa Rica

San Salvador

=== Costa Rica 1969 ===
In 1969, Costa Rica hosted the continental championship for their first and only time. The six qualified teams played each other once in a single group. Costa Rica won their first four matches, but were only one point ahead of Guatemala, which they faced directly in the last match. A 1–1 draw secured them the tournament victory in front of the home crowd.

==== Final round ====
Rank	Team	Pts	Pld	W	D*	L	GF	GA	GD
1	Costa Rica	9	5	4	1	0	13	2	11
2	Guatemala	8	5	3	2	0	10	2	8
3	Netherlands Antilles	5	5	2	1	2	9	12	−3
4	Mexico	4	5	1	2	2	4	5	−1
5	Trinidad and Tobago	3	5	1	1	3	4	12	−8
6	Jamaica	1	5	0	1	4	3	10	−7

23 November 1969

Costa Rica	3–0	Jamaica
Álvaro Cascante; Roy Sáenz; Edward Dawkins o.g.'

Estadio Nacional, Costa Rica
Attendance: 7,389

27 November 1969

Costa Rica	2–1	Netherlands Antilles
Jaime Grant; Álvaro Cascante		Croes

Estadio Nacional, Costa Rica

30 November 1969

Costa Rica	2–0	Mexico
Jaime Grant; Roy Sáenz

Estadio Nacional, Costa Rica
Attendance: 20,460

4 December 1969

Costa Rica	5–0	Trinidad and Tobago
Víctor Ruiz; Wálter Elizondo

Estadio Nacional, Costa Rica

7 December 1969

Costa Rica	1–1	Guatemala
Wally Vaughns		Marco Antonio Fión

Estadio Nacional, Costa Rica

=== 1989 CONCACAF Championship ===
In the qualification for the tournament, Costa Rica were about to face the favored team from Mexico. However, before the matches were played, Mexico was disqualified and Costa Rica given a bye to the tournament stage.

In a group of five teams, home and away matches were played against each opponent. When Costa Rica were done with their eight matches in July, the United States still had four matches ahead of them, and were only trailing behind leaders Costa Rica by six points and three goals. However, the US team ended up drawing twice and only won the other two matches by one goal each. With that, Costa Rica won the tournament on account of better goal difference, four months after their own last match.

==== Final round ====
	Pld	W	D *	L	GF	GA	GD	Pts
Costa Rica	8	5	1	2	10	6	+4	11
United States	8	4	3	1	6	3	+3	11
Trinidad and Tobago	8	3	3	2	7	5	+2	9
Guatemala	6	1	1	4	4	7	−3	3
El Salvador	6	0	2	4	2	8	−6	2

	(Costa Rica)	(El Salvador)	(Guatemala)	(Trinidad and Tobago)	(United States)
Costa Rica	–	1–0	2–1	1–0	1–0
El Salvador	2–4	–	X–X	0–0	0–1
Guatemala	1–0	X–X	–	0–1	0–0
Trinidad and Tobago	1–1	2–0	2–1	–	0–1
United States	1–0	0–0	2–1	1–1	–

19 March 1989

Guatemala	1–0	Costa Rica
Chacón 39' (pen.)

Estadio Mateo Flores, Guatemala City
Referee: Tony Evangelista (Canada)

2 April 1989

Costa Rica	2–1	Guatemala
Flores 42'; Coronado 78'		Rodas 51'

Estadio Nacional de Costa Rica, San José
Referee: John Meachin (Canada)

16 April 1989

Costa Rica	1–0	United States
Rhoden 14'

Estadio Nacional de Costa Rica, San José
Attendance: 26,271
Referee: José Antonio Garza (Mexico)

30 April 1989

United States	1–0	Costa Rica
Ramos 72'

Saint Louis Soccer Park, Fenton
Attendance: 8,500
Referee: Rodolfo Méndez (Honduras)

28 May 1989

Trinidad and Tobago	1–1	Costa Rica
Jones		Coronado

National Stadium, Port of Spain
Referee: Edgardo Codesal (Mexico)

11 June 1989

Costa Rica	1–0	Trinidad and Tobago
Cayasso 2'

Estadio Nacional de Costa Rica, San José
Referee: José Joaquín Torres Cadena (Colombia)

25 June 1989

El Salvador	2–4	Costa Rica
Rodriguez 24'; Rivas 63'		Cayasso 16'; Hidalgo 46'; Flóres 51', 75'

Estadio Cuscatlán, San Salvador
Attendance: 40,000
Referee: Arturo Brizio Carter (Mexico)

16 July 1989

Costa Rica	1–0	El Salvador
Fernández 55'

Estadio Nacional de Costa Rica, San José
Referee: Jorge Orellana Vimos (Ecuador)

== Gold Cup appearances ==
=== 2023 CONCACAF Gold Cup ===
==== Group C ====
Pos	Team	Pld	W	D	L	GF	GA	GD	Pts	Qualification
1	Panama	3	2	1	0	6	4	+2	7	Advance to knockout stage
2	Costa Rica	3	1	1	1	7	6	+1	4	Advance to knockout stage
3	Martinique	3	1	0	2	7	9	−2	3	
4	El Salvador	3	0	2	1	3	4	−1	2	

Source: CONCACAF
June 26, 2023
20:30

Costa Rica	1–2	Panama
Suárez 90+1'	Report	Fajardo 23'; Bárcenas 68'

DRV PNK Stadium, Fort Lauderdale
Attendance: 10,101
Referee: Drew Fischer (Canada)

June 30, 2023
20:30

El Salvador	0–0	Costa Rica
	Report

Red Bull Arena, Harrison
Attendance: 22,615
Referee: César Ramos (Mexico)

July 4, 2023
20:30

Costa Rica	6–4	Martinique
Waston 10'; Calvo 41'; Vargas 55'; Campbell 59' (pen.); Contreras 68'; Campos 90'	Report	Burner 18', 79'; Labeau 75' (pen.); Mexique 90+3'

Red Bull Arena, Harrison
Attendance: 21,531
Referee: Bryan López (Guatemala)

==== Quarter-finals ====
July 8, 2023
21:30 (20:30 UTC−5)

Mexico	2–0	Costa Rica
Pineda 52' (pen.); É. Sánchez 87'	Report

AT&T Stadium, Arlington
Attendance: 60,355
Referee: Saíd Martínez (Honduras)

=== 2025 CONCACAF Gold Cup ===
==== Group A ====
Pos	Team	Pld	W	D	L	GF	GA	GD	Pts	Qualification
1	Mexico	3	2	1	0	5	2	+3	7	Advance to knockout stage
2	Costa Rica	3	2	1	0	6	4	+2	7	Advance to knockout stage
3	Dominican Republic	3	0	1	2	3	5	−2	1	
4	Suriname	3	0	1	2	3	6	−3	1	

Source: CONCACAF
Rules for classification: Tiebreakers
June 15, 2025
23:00 (20:00 UTC−7)

Costa Rica	4–3	Suriname
Martínez 14'; Ugalde 19' (pen.), 90+13' (pen.); Alcócer 76'	Report	Kerk 34'; Margaret 59'; Pinas 64' (pen.)

Snapdragon Stadium, San Diego
Attendance: 7,736
Referee: Joe Dickerson (United States)

June 18, 2025
19:06 (18:06 UTC−5)

Costa Rica	2–1	Dominican Republic
Ugalde 44' (pen.); Alcócer 85'	Report	Urbáez 16'

AT&T Stadium, Arlington
Attendance: 34,015
Referee: Lukasz Szpala (United States)

June 22, 2025
22:00 (19:00 UTC−7)

Mexico	0–0	Costa Rica
	Report

Allegiant Stadium, Paradise
Attendance: 35,000
Referee: Mario Escobar (Guatemala)

==== Quarter-finals ====
June 29, 2025
19:00 (18:00 UTC−5)

United States	2–2	Costa Rica
Luna 43'; Arfsten 47'	Report	Calvo 12' (pen.); Martínez 71'
Penalties
Adams (penalty scored); Tillman (penalty scored); Berhalter (penalty missed); Freeman (penalty scored); Tolkin (penalty missed); Downs (penalty scored)	4–3	(penalty scored) Martínez; (penalty missed) J. Vargas; (penalty scored) Van der Putten; (penalty scored) Brenes; (penalty missed) Calvo; (penalty missed) Rojas

U.S. Bank Stadium, Minneapolis
Attendance: 32,289
Referee: Walter López (Guatemala)

== See also ==
- Costa Rica at the Copa América
- Costa Rica at the FIFA World Cup
