= Jamaica at the Copa América =

Soccer tournament in South America

The Copa América is South America's major tournament in senior men's football and determines the continental champion. Until 1967, the tournament was known as South American Championship. It is the oldest continental championship in the world.

Jamaica are not members of the South American football confederation CONMEBOL. But because CONMEBOL only has ten member associations, guest nations have regularly been invited since 1993.

== Record at the Copa América ==
Jamaica was invited to the Copa América for the first time in 2015, finishing last among Argentina, Uruguay, and Paraguay. The following year, the team competed in the Copa América Centenario as winners of the 2014 Caribbean Cup, again finishing last in the group stage.

Jamaica qualified for the 2024 Copa América by reaching the 2023–24 CONCACAF Nations League A semi-finals, following their win against Canada in the quarter-finals.

Copa América record
Year	Result	Position	Pld	W	D	L	GF	GA	Squad
(Chile) 2015	Group stage	12th	3	0	0	3	0	3	Squad
(United States) 2016	Group stage	15th	3	0	0	3	0	6	Squad
(United States) 2024	Group stage	15th	3	0	0	3	1	7	Squad
Total	Invitation	0 titles	9	0	0	9	1	16	

== 2015 Copa América ==
=== Group stage ===
Pos	Team	Pld	W	D	L	GF	GA	GD	Pts	Qualification
1	Argentina	3	2	1	0	4	2	+2	7	Advance to knockout stage
2	Paraguay	3	1	2	0	4	3	+1	5	Advance to knockout stage
3	Uruguay	3	1	1	1	2	2	0	4	Advance to knockout stage
4	Jamaica	3	0	0	3	0	3	−3	0	

Source: CONMEBOL
Rules for classification: Tie-breaking criteria

== Copa América Centenario ==
=== Group stage ===
Pos	Team	Pld	W	D	L	GF	GA	GD	Pts	Qualification
1	Mexico	3	2	1	0	6	2	+4	7	Advance to knockout stage
2	Venezuela	3	2	1	0	3	1	+2	7	Advance to knockout stage
3	Uruguay	3	1	0	2	4	4	0	3	
4	Jamaica	3	0	0	3	0	6	−6	0	

Source: CONMEBOL & CONCACAF

== 2024 Copa América ==
=== Group stage ===
Pos	Team	Pld	W	D	L	GF	GA	GD	Pts	Qualification
1	Venezuela	3	3	0	0	6	1	+5	9	Advance to knockout stage
2	Ecuador	3	1	1	1	4	3	+1	4	Advance to knockout stage
3	Mexico	3	1	1	1	1	1	0	4	
4	Jamaica	3	0	0	3	1	7	−6	0	

Source: CONMEBOL
Rules for classification: Tiebreakers
June 22, 2024
8:00 pm CDT (UTC−5)

Mexico	1–0	Jamaica
Arteaga 69'	Report (CONMEBOL); Report (CONCACAF)

NRG Stadium, Houston, Texas
Attendance: 53,763
Referee: Ismail Elfath (United States)

June 26, 2024
3:00 pm PDT (UTC−7)

Ecuador	3–1	Jamaica
Hincapié 13'; Páez 45+4' (pen.); Minda 90+1'	Report (CONMEBOL); Report (CONCACAF)	Antonio 54'

Allegiant Stadium, Paradise, Nevada
Attendance: 24,074
Referee: Cristian Garay (Chile)

June 30, 2024
7:00 pm CDT (UTC−5)

Jamaica	0–3	Venezuela
	Report (CONMEBOL); Report (CONCACAF)	Bello 49'; Rondón 56'; Ramírez 85'

Q2 Stadium, Austin, Texas
Attendance: 20,240
Referee: Maurizio Mariani (Italy)

== See also ==
- Jamaica at the CONCACAF Gold Cup
- Jamaica at the FIFA World Cup
