= North, Central American and Caribbean nations at the FIFA World Cup =

International football delegations

Association football is the most popular sport in almost all North, Central American and Caribbean countries, and twelve members of the Confederation of North, Central American and Caribbean Association Football, CONCACAF, have competed at the sport's biggest event – the men's FIFA World Cup. CONCACAF countries have hosted the finals four times.

== Overview ==
	1930 (Uruguay) (13)	1934 (Italy) (16)	1938 (France) (15)	1950 (Brazil) (13)	1954 (Switzerland) (16)	1958 (Sweden) (16)	1962 (Chile) (16)	1966 (England) (16)	1970 (Mexico) (16)	1974 (West Germany) (16)	1978 (Argentina) (16)	1982 (Spain) (24)	1986 (Mexico) (24)	1990 (Italy) (24)	1994 (United States) (24)	1998 (France) (32)	2002 (South Korea) (Japan) (32)	2006 (Germany) (32)	2010 (South Africa) (32)	2014 (Brazil) (32)	2018 (Russia) (32)	2022 (Qatar) (32)	2026 (Canada) (Mexico) (United States) (48)	2030 (Morocco) (Portugal) (Spain) (48)	2034 (Saudi Arabia) (48)	Total
Teams	(Mexico) (United States)	(United States)	(Cuba)	(Mexico) (United States)	(Mexico)	(Mexico)	(Mexico)	(Mexico)	(Mexico) (El Salvador)	(Haiti)	(Mexico)	(Honduras) (El Salvador)	(Mexico) (Canada)	(United States) (Costa Rica)	(Mexico) (United States)	(Mexico) (United States) (Jamaica)	(Mexico) (United States) (Costa Rica)	(Mexico) (United States) (Costa Rica) (Trinidad and Tobago)	(Mexico) (United States) (Honduras)	(Mexico) (United States) (Costa Rica) (Honduras)	(Mexico) (Costa Rica) (Panama)	(Mexico) (United States) (Costa Rica) (Canada)	(Mexico) (United States) (Canada) (Haiti) (Panama) (Curaçao)			52
Top 32	—	—	—	—	—	—	—	—	—	—	—	—	—	—	—	—	—	—	—	—	—	—	3			3
Top 16	—	—	—	—	—	—	—	—	—	—	—	0 (Note: In 1982, the second round featured 12 teams of which 4 advanced to the semi-finals.)	1	1	2	1	2	1	2	3	1	1	3			18
Top 8	—	0	1	—	0	0	0	0	1	0	0	0	1	0	0	0	1	0	0	1	0	0	0			5
Top 4	1	0	0	0	0	0	0	0	0	0	0	0	0	0	0	0	0	0	0	0	0	0	0			1
Top 2	0	0	0	0	0	0	0	0	0	0	0	0	0	0	0	0	0	0	0	0	0	0	0			0
1st																										0
2nd																										0
3rd	(United States)																									1
4th																										0

Team	No.	Years	Best result
Mexico	18	1930, 1950, 1954, 1958, 1962, 1966, **1970**, 1978, **1986**, 1994, 1998, 2002, 2006, 2010, 2014, 2018, 2022, 2026	QF
United States	12	**1930**, 1934, 1950, 1990, 1994, 1998, 2002, 2006, 2010, 2014, 2022, 2026	3rd
Costa Rica	6	1990, 2002, 2006, **2014**, 2018, 2022	QF
Honduras	3	1982, 2010, 2014	GS
Canada	3	1986, 2022, **2026**	R16
El Salvador	2	1970, 1982	GS
Haiti	2	1974, 2026	GS
Panama	2	2018, 2026	GS
Cuba	1	**1938**	QF
Jamaica	1	1998	GS
Trinidad and Tobago	1	2006	GS
Curaçao	1	2026	GS

- **Bold** indicates year(s) of best finish

== Results ==
=== Tournament standings ===
Team	Champions	Final	Semi-finals	Quarter-finals (Note: Knockout round of 8: 1934–1938, 1954–1970, and 1986–present; second group stage, top 8: 1974–1978)	Round of 16 (Note: Second group stage, top 12: 1982; knockout round of 16: 1986–present)	Round of 32 (Note: Knockout round of 32: 2026–present)
United States	0	0	1	1	6	1
Mexico	0	0	0	2	9	1
Costa Rica	0	0	0	1	2	0
Cuba	0	0	0	1	0	0
Canada	0	0	0	0	1	1

=== Team results by tournament ===
The team ranking in each tournament is according to FIFA. The rankings, apart from the top four positions (top two in 1930), are not a result of direct competition between the teams; instead, teams eliminated in the same round are ranked by their full results in the tournament.

For each tournament, the number of teams in each finals tournament (in brackets) are shown.

FIFA World Cup results of CONCACAF members
Team	1930 (Uruguay) (13)	1934 (Italy) (16)	1938 (France) (15)	1950 (Brazil) (13)	1954 (Switzerland) (16)	1958 (Sweden) (16)	1962 (Chile) (16)	1966 (England) (16)	1970 (Mexico) (16)	1974 (West Germany) (16)	1978 (Argentina) (16)	1982 (Spain) (24)	1986 (Mexico) (24)	1990 (Italy) (24)	1994 (United States) (24)	1998 (France) (32)	2002 (South Korea) (Japan) (32)	2006 (Germany) (32)	2010 (South Africa) (32)	2014 (Brazil) (32)	2018 (Russia) (32)	2022 (Qatar) (32)	2026 (Canada) (Mexico) (United States) (48)	2030 (Morocco) (Portugal) (Spain) (48)	2034 (Saudi Arabia) (48)	Total	Qual. Comp.
Canada						•	×		•	•	•	•	GS; 24th	•	•	•	•	•	•	•	•	GS; 31st	R16; 14th	TBD	TBD	3	16
Costa Rica			×		×	•	•	•	•	•	•	•	•	R16; 13th	•	•	GS; 19th	GS; 31st	•	QF; 8th	GS; 29th	GS; 27th	•	TBD	TBD	6	18
Cuba	—N/a	•	QF; 8th	•	×			•	×		•	•		•	×	•	•	•	•	•	•	•	•	TBD	TBD	1	15
Curaçao (Note: Competed as Curaçao until 1958 and as Netherlands Antilles from 1958 to 2010.)	—N/a					•	•	•	•	•	•	•	•	•	•	•	•	•	•	•	•	•	GS; 42nd	TBD	TBD	1	18
El Salvador	—N/a		×						GS; 16th	•	•	GS1; 24th	•	•	•	•	•	•	•	•	•	•	•	TBD	TBD	2	15
Haiti	—N/a	•			•				•	GS1; 15th	•	•	•		•	•	•	•	•	•	•	•	GS; 45th	TBD	TBD	2	16
Honduras	—N/a						•	•	•	•	×	GS1; 18th	•	•	•	•	•	•	GS; 30th	GS; 31st	•	•	•	TBD	TBD	3	16
Jamaica	—N/a							•	•	×	•	•	×	•	•	GS; 22nd	•	•	•	•	•	•	•	TBD	TBD	1	13
Mexico	GS; 13th	•	×	GS; 12th	GS; 13th	GS; 16th	GS; 11th	GS; 12th	QF; 6th	•	GS1; 16th	•	QF; 6th	×	R16; 13th	R16; 13th	R16; 11th	R16; 15th	R16; 14th	R16; 10th	R16; 12th	GS; 22nd	R16; 9th	TBD	TBD	18	21
Panama	—N/a										•	•	•	•	•	•	•	•	•	•	GS; 32nd	•	GS; 43rd	TBD	TBD	2	13
Trinidad and Tobago	—N/a							•	•	•	•	•	•	•	•	•	•	GS; 27th	•	•	•	•	•	TBD	TBD	1	16
United States	3rd	R16; 16th	×	GS; 10th	•	•	•	•	•	•	•	•	•	GS; 23rd	R16; 14th	GS; 32nd	QF; 8th	GS; 25th	R16; 12th	R16; 15th	•	R16; 14th	R16; 12th	TBD	TBD	12	22

Legend

1st	Champions
2nd	Runners-up
3rd	Third place
4th	Fourth place
QF	Quarter-finals (1934–1938, 1954–1970, 1986–present)
R16	Knockout round of 16 (1934–1938, 1986–present)
R32	Knockout round of 32 (2026–present)
GS	Group stage (1930, 1950–1970, 1986–present)
GS1	First group stage (1974–1982)
GS2	Second group stage (1974–1982)

Q	Qualified for upcoming tournament
TBD	To be determined (may still qualify for upcoming tournament)
••	Qualified but withdrew
•	Did not qualify
•×	Withdrew or disqualified during qualification (after playing matches)
×	Withdrew before qualification / Banned / Entry not accepted by FIFA
	Hosts
	Did not enter
—N/a	Not a FIFA member

=== Overall team records ===
As per statistical convention in football, matches decided in extra time are counted as wins and losses, while matches decided by a penalty shoot-out are counted as draws. 3 points per win, 1 point per draw and 0 points per loss.

As of 2026 FIFA World Cup

Team	Part	Pld	W	D	L	GF	GA	GD	Pts
Mexico	18	65	21	15	29	72	104	−32	78
United States	12	42	12	8	22	51	74	−23	44
Costa Rica	6	21	6	5	10	22	39	−16	23
Canada	3	11	2	1	8	11	18	−7	7
Cuba	1	3	1	1	1	5	12	−7	4
Jamaica	1	3	1	0	2	3	9	−6	3
Honduras	3	9	0	3	6	3	14	−11	3
Trinidad and Tobago	1	3	0	1	2	0	4	−4	1
Curaçao	1	3	0	1	2	1	9	−8	1
Panama	2	6	0	0	6	2	15	−13	0
Haiti	2	6	0	0	6	4	22	−18	0
El Salvador	2	6	0	0	6	1	22	−21	0

== Appearances ==
=== Ranking of teams by number of appearances ===
As of 2026 FIFA World Cup

Team	Appearances	Record streak	Active streak	Debut	Most recent	Best result (* = hosts)
Mexico	18	9	9	1930	2026	Quarter-finals (1970*, 1986*)
United States	12	7	2	1930	2026	Third place (1930)
Costa Rica	6	3	3	1990	2022	Quarter-finals (2014)
Canada	3	2	2	1986	2026	Round of 16 (2026*)
Honduras	3	2	0	1982	2014	Group stage
El Salvador	2	1	0	1970	1982	Group stage
Haiti	2	1	1	1974	2026	Group stage
Panama	2	1	1	2018	2026	Group stage
Curaçao	1	1	1	2026	2026	Group stage
Cuba	1	1	0	1938	1938	Quarter-finals (1938)
Jamaica	1	1	0	1998	1998	Group stage
Trinidad and Tobago	1	1	0	2006	2006	Group stage

=== Team debuts ===
Year	Debutants	Total
1930	Mexico, United States	2
1938	Cuba	1
1970	El Salvador	1
1974	Haiti	1
1982	Honduras	1
1986	Canada	1
1990	Costa Rica	1
1998	Jamaica	1
2006	Trinidad and Tobago	1
2018	Panama	1
2026	Curaçao	1
Total		12

=== Not qualified ===
23 of the 35 active FIFA and CONCACAF members have never qualified for the final tournament.

Team	Number of qualifying attempts	1930 (Uruguay)	1934 (Italy)	1938 (France)	1950 (Brazil)	1954 (Switzerland)	1958 (Sweden)	1962 (Chile)	1966 (England)	1970 (Mexico)	1974 (West Germany)	1978 (Argentina)	1982 (Spain)	1986 (Mexico)	1990 (Italy)	1994 (United States)	1998 (France)	2002 (South Korea) (Japan)	2006 (Germany)	2010 (South Africa)	2014 (Brazil)	2018 (Russia)	2022 (Qatar)	2026 (Canada) (Mexico) (United States)	2030 (Morocco) (Portugal) (Spain)	2034 (Saudi Arabia)
Guatemala	17	—N/a					•	•×	×	•	•	•	•	•	•	•	•	•	•	•	•	•	•	•	TBD	TBD
Suriname (Note: Entered World Cup qualifying as Dutch Guiana in 1938 and 1962–1974)	16			×				•	•	•	•	•	•	•	×	•	•	•	•	•	•	•	•	•	TBD	TBD
Antigua and Barbuda	12	—N/a									•			•	•	•	•	•	•	•	•	•	•	•	TBD	TBD
Guyana	12	—N/a										•	•	•	•	•	•	×	•	•	•	•	•	•	TBD	TBD
Puerto Rico	11	—N/a									•			•	•	•	•	•	×	•	•	•	•	•	TBD	TBD
Barbados	10	—N/a										•		×		•	•	•	•	•	•	•	•	•	TBD	TBD
Dominican Republic	10	—N/a										•				•	•	•	•	•	•	•	•	•	TBD	TBD
Bermuda	9	—N/a								•						•	×	•	•	•	•	•	•	•	TBD	TBD
Grenada	9	—N/a											•	×			•	•	•	•	•	•	•	•	TBD	TBD
Nicaragua	9	—N/a														•	•	•	•	•	•	•	•	•	TBD	TBD
Saint Vincent and the Grenadines	9	—N/a														•	•	•	•	•	•	•	•	•	TBD	TBD
Aruba	8	Part of Territory of Curaçao						Part of Netherlands Antilles									•	•	•	•	•	•	•	•	TBD	TBD
Belize	8	—N/a														×	•	•	•	•	•	•	•	•	TBD	TBD
Cayman Islands	8	—N/a															•	•	•	•	•	•	•	•	TBD	TBD
Dominica	8	—N/a															•	•	•	•	•	•	•	•	TBD	TBD
Saint Kitts and Nevis	8	—N/a															•	•	•	•	•	•	•	•	TBD	TBD
Saint Lucia	8	—N/a														•	•	•	•	•	•	•	×	•	TBD	TBD
Anguilla	7	—N/a																•	•	•	•	•	•	•	TBD	TBD
British Virgin Islands	7	—N/a																•	•	•	•	•	•	•	TBD	TBD
Montserrat	7	—N/a																•	•	•	•	•	•	•	TBD	TBD
Turks and Caicos Islands	7	—N/a																•	•	•	•	•	•	•	TBD	TBD
U.S. Virgin Islands	7	—N/a																•	•	•	•	•	•	•	TBD	TBD
Bahamas	6	—N/a															×	•	•	•	×	•	•	•	TBD	TBD

Legend

TBD	To be determined (may still qualify for upcoming tournament)
•	Did not qualify
•×	Withdrew or disqualified during qualification (after playing matches)
×	Withdrew before qualification / Banned / Entry not accepted by FIFA
	Did not enter
—N/a	Not a FIFA member

== Summary of performance ==
This table shows for each world cup the number of countries at the World Cup, the number of entries (No.) from around the world including any rejections and withdrawals, the number of North, Central American and Caribbean entries (#A), how many of those North, Central American and Caribbean entries withdrew (#A-) before/during qualification or were rejected by FIFA, the North, Central American and Caribbean representatives at the World Cup finals, the number of World Cup Qualifiers each North, Central American and Caribbean representative had to play to get to the World Cup (#WCQ), the furthest stage they reached, their results, and their coaches.

Year	Host	Size	No.	#A	#A-	North, Central American and Caribbean finalists	#WCQ	Stage	Results	Coach
1930	Uruguay	13	13	2	0	Mexico	0	Group stage	lost 1–4 France, lost 0–3 Chile, lost 3–6 Argentina	(Mexico) Juan Luque de Serralonga
1930	Uruguay	13	13	2	0	United States	0	Third place	won 3–0 Belgium, won 3–0 Paraguay; SF: lost 1–6 Argentina	(United States) Robert Millar
1934	Italy	16	32	4	0	United States	1	Round of 16	lost 1–7 Italy	(United States) David Gould
1938	France	15	37	6	5 (Note: It was originally intended that the World Cup would be held alternately between the continents of South America and Europe. However Jules Rimet, the creator of the World Cup, convinced FIFA to hold the competition in France, his home country. Because of this controversy, many American countries, including Argentina (the most likely hosts if the event was held in South America), Colombia, Costa Rica, El Salvador, Mexico, Dutch Guiana, Uruguay, and the United States all withdrew or refused to enter.)	Cuba	0	Quarter-finals	drew 3–3 (a.e.t.) Romania, replay match won 2–1 Romania; QF: lost 0–8 Sweden	(Cuba) José Tapia
1950	Brazil	13	34	3	0	Mexico	4	Group stage	lost 0–4 Brazil, lost 1–4 Yugoslavia, lost 1–2 Switzerland	(Mexico) Octavio Vial
1950	Brazil	13	34	3	0	United States	4	Group stage	lost 1–3 Spain, won 1–0 England, lost 2–5 Chile	(United States) William Jeffrey
1954	Switzerland	16	45	3	0	Mexico	4	Group stage	lost 0–5 Brazil, lost 2–3 France	(Spain) Antonio López Herranz
1958	Sweden	16	55	6	0	Mexico	6	Group stage	lost 0–3 Sweden, drew 1–1 Wales, lost 0–4 Hungary	(Spain) Antonio López Herranz
1962	Chile	16	56	8	1 (Note: Canada withdrew before the qualification matches began.)	Mexico	6	Group stage	lost 0–2 Brazil, lost 0–1 Spain, won 3–1 Czechoslovakia	(Mexico) Ignacio Tréllez
1966	England	16	74	9	0	Mexico	4	Group stage	drew 1–1 France, lost 0–2 England, drew 0–0 Uruguay	(Mexico) Ignacio Tréllez
1970	Mexico	16	75	12	0	Mexico	0	Quarter-finals	drew 0–0 Soviet Union, won 4–0 El Salvador, won 1–0 Belgium; QF: lost 1–4 Italy	(Mexico) Raúl Cárdenas
1970	Mexico	16	75	12	0	El Salvador	8	Group stage	lost 0–3 Belgium, lost 0–4 Mexico, lost 0–2 Soviet Union	(Chile) Hernán Carrasco Vivanco
1974	West Germany	16	99	14	1 (Note: Jamaica withdrew.)	Haiti	7	First round	lost 1–3 Italy, lost 0–7 Poland, lost 1–4 Argentina	(Haiti) Antoine Tassy
1978	Argentina	16	107	16	0	Mexico	9	First round	lost 1–3 Tunisia, lost 0–6 West Germany, lost 1–3 Poland	(Mexico) José Antonio Roca
1982	Spain	24	109	15	0	Honduras	13	First round	drew 1–1 Spain, drew 1–1 Northern Ireland, lost 0–1 Yugoslavia	(Honduras) José de la Paz Herrera
1982	Spain	24	109	15	0	El Salvador	13	First round	lost 1–10 Hungary, lost 0–1 Belgium, lost 0–2 Argentina	(El Salvador) Pipo Rodríguez
1986	Mexico	24	121	16	3 (Note: Jamaica, Barbados, Grenada withdrew.)	Mexico	0	Quarter-finals	won 2–1 Belgium, drew 1–1 Paraguay, won 1–0 Iraq; R16: won 2–0 Bulgaria; QF: lost 0–0 (1–4 p) West Germany	(Socialist Federal Republic of Yugoslavia) Bora Milutinović
1986	Mexico	24	121	16	3	Canada	8	Group stage	lost 0–1 France, lost 0–2 Hungary, lost 0–2 Soviet Union	(England) Tony Waiters
1990	Italy	24	116	16	2 (Note: FIFA rejected the entry of Belize due to debts to FIFA.Mexico was disqualified for fielding over-aged players in a youth tournament.)	Costa Rica	10	Round of 16	won 1–0 Scotland, lost 0–1 Brazil, won 2–1 Sweden; R16: lost 1–4 Czechoslovakia	(Socialist Federal Republic of Yugoslavia) Bora Milutinović
1990	Italy	24	116	16	2	United States	10	Group stage	lost 1–5 Czechoslovakia, lost 0–1 Italy, lost 1–2 Austria	(United States) Bob Gansler
1994	United States	24	147	23	1 (Note: Cuba withdrew.)	Mexico	12	Round of 16	lost 0–1 Norway, won 2–1 Republic of Ireland, drew 1–1 Italy; R16: lost 1–1 (1–3 p) Bulgaria	(Mexico) Miguel Mejía Barón
1994	United States	24	147	23	1	United States	0	Round of 16	drew 1–1 Switzerland, won 2–1 Colombia, lost 0–1 Romania; R16: lost 0–1 Brazil	(Federal Republic of Yugoslavia) Bora Milutinović
1998	France	32	174	30	1 (Note: Bermuda withdrew.)	Mexico	16	Round of 16	won 3–1 South Korea, drew 2–2 Belgium, drew 2–2 Netherlands; R16: lost 1–2 Germany	(Mexico) Manuel Lapuente
1998	France	32	174	30	1	Jamaica	20	Group stage	lost 0–1 Croatia, lost 0–5 Argentina, won 2–1 Japan	(Brazil) Renê Simões
1998	France	32	174	30	1	United States	16	Group stage	lost 0–2 Germany, lost 1–2 Iran, lost 0–1 FR Yugoslavia	(United States) Steve Sampson
2002	South Korea; Japan	32	199	35	1 (Note: Guyana were suspended by FIFA.)	Costa Rica	17	Group stage	won 2–0 China, drew 1–1 Turkey, lost 2–5 Brazil	(Costa Rica) Alexandre Guimarães
2002	South Korea; Japan	32	199	35	1	Mexico	16	Round of 16	won 1–0 Croatia, won 2–1 Ecuador, drew 1–1 Italy; R16: lost 0–2 United States	(Mexico) Javier Aguirre
2002	South Korea; Japan	32	199	35	1	United States	16	Quarter-finals	won 3–2 Portugal, drew 1–1 South Korea, lost 1–3 Poland; R16: won 2–0 Mexico; QF: lost 0–1 Germany	(United States) Bruce Arena
2006	Germany	32	197	35	1 (Note: Puerto Rico declined to participate.)	Costa Rica	18	Group stage	lost 2–4 Germany, lost 0–3 Ecuador, lost 1–2 Poland	(Costa Rica) Alexandre Guimarães
2006	Germany	32	197	35	1	Trinidad and Tobago	20	Group stage	drew 0–0 Sweden, lost 0–2 England, lost 0–2 Paraguay	(Netherlands) Leo Beenhakker
2006	Germany	32	197	35	1	Mexico	18	Round of 16	won 3–1 Iran, drew 0–0 Angola, lost 1–2 Portugal; R16: lost 1–2 (a.e.t.) Argentina	(Argentina) Ricardo Lavolpe
2006	Germany	32	197	35	1	United States	18	Group stage	lost 0–3 Czech Republic, drew 1–1 Italy, lost 1–2 Ghana	(United States) Bruce Arena
2010	South Africa	32	205	35	0	Honduras	18	Group stage	lost 0–1 Chile, lost 0–2 Spain, drew 0–0 Switzerland	(Colombia) Reinaldo Rueda
2010	South Africa	32	205	35	0	Mexico	18	Round of 16	drew 1–1 South Africa, won 2–0 France, lost 0–1 Uruguay; R16: lost 1–3 Argentina	(Mexico) Javier Aguirre
2010	South Africa	32	205	35	0	United States	18	Round of 16	drew 1–1 England, drew 2–2 Slovenia, won 1–0 Algeria; R16: lost 1–2 (a.e.t.) Ghana	(United States) Bob Bradley
2014	Brazil	32	203	35	1 (Note: Bahamas withdrew from the tournament on 19 August 2011 and were not replaced)	Costa Rica	16	Quarter-finals	won 3–1 Uruguay, won 1–0 Italy, drew 0–0 England; R16: won 1–1 (5–3 p) Greece; QF: lost 0–0 (3–4 p) Netherlands	(Colombia) Jorge Luis Pinto
2014	Brazil	32	203	35	1	Honduras	16	Group stage	lost 0–3 France, lost 1–2 Ecuador, lost 0–3 Switzerland	(Colombia) Luis Fernando Suárez
2014	Brazil	32	203	35	1	United States	16	Round of 16	won 2–0 Ghana, drew 2–2 Portugal, lost 0–1 Germany; R16: lost 1–2 (a.e.t.) Belgium	(Germany) Jürgen Klinsmann
2014	Brazil	32	203	35	1	Mexico	18	Round of 16	won 1–0 Cameroon, drew 0–0 Brazil, won 3–1 Croatia; R16: lost 1–2 Netherlands	(Mexico) Miguel Herrera
2018	Russia	32	210	35	0	Costa Rica	16	Group stage	lost 0–1 Serbia, lost 0–2 Brazil, drew 2–2 Switzerland	(Costa Rica) Óscar Ramírez
2018	Russia	32	210	35	0	Mexico	16	Round of 16	won 1–0 Germany, won 2–1 South Korea, lost 0–3 Sweden; R16: lost 0–2 Brazil	(Mexico) Juan Carlos Osorio
2018	Russia	32	210	35	0	Panama	16	Group stage	lost 0–3 Belgium, lost 1–6 England, lost 1–2 Tunisia	(Colombia) Hernán Darío Gómez
2022	Qatar	32	206	35	1	Canada	20	Group stage	lost 0–1 Belgium, lost 1–4 Croatia, lost 1–2 Morocco	(England) John Herdman
2022	Qatar	32	206	35	1	Costa Rica	15	Group stage	lost 0–7 Spain, won 1–0 Japan, lost 2–4 Germany	(Colombia) Luis Fernando Suárez
2022	Qatar	32	206	35	1	Mexico	14	Group stage	drew 0–0 Poland, lost 0–2 Argentina, won 2–1 Saudi Arabia	(Argentina) Gerardo Martino
2022	Qatar	32	206	35	1	United States	14	Round of 16	drew 1–1 Wales, drew 0–0 England, won 1–0 Iran; R16: lost 1–3 Netherlands	(United States) Gregg Berhalter
2026	Canada; Mexico; United States	48	208	32	0	Canada	0	Round of 16	drew 1–1 Bosnia and Herzegovina, won 6–0 Qatar, lost 1–2 Switzerland; R32: won 1–0 South Africa; R16: lost 0–3 Morocco	(United States) Jesse Marsch
2026	Canada; Mexico; United States	48	208	32	0	Curaçao	10	Group stage	lost 1–7 Germany, drew 0–0 Ecuador, lost 0–2 Ivory Coast	(Netherlands) Dick Advocaat
2026	Canada; Mexico; United States	48	208	32	0	Haiti	10	Group stage	lost 0–1 Scotland, lost 0–3 Brazil, lost 2–4 Morocco	(France) Sébastien Migné
2026	Canada; Mexico; United States	48	208	32	0	Mexico	0	Round of 16	won 2–0 South Africa, won 1–0 South Korea, won 3–0 Czech Republic; R32: won 2–0 Ecuador; R16: lost 2–3 England	(Mexico) Javier Aguirre
2026	Canada; Mexico; United States	48	208	32	0	Panama	10	Group stage	lost 0–1 Ghana, lost 0–1 Croatia, lost 0–2 England	(Spain) Thomas Christiansen
2026	Canada; Mexico; United States	48	208	32	0	United States	0	Round of 16	won 4–1 Paraguay, won 2–0 Australia, lost 2–3 Turkey; R32: won 2–0 Bosnia and Herzegovina; R16: lost 1–4 Belgium	(Argentina) Mauricio Pochettino

== Competitive record ==
=== 1930s: The best US performance at the FIFA World Cup ===
Two teams from North America entered the tournament. Mexico was seeded in Group 1, and took part of the first World Cup match ever, losing 4–1 to France. Defeats to Chile and Argentina followed, with Mexico finishing last overall.

The United States dominated Group 4, winning both games 3–0. The first, against Belgium, had American goalkeeper Jimmy Douglas to be the first with an official "clean sheet" in the tournament. The ease of the victory was unexpected; Uruguayan newspaper Imparcial wrote that "the large score of the American victory has really surprised the experts". The second match, played in windy conditions, witnessed the first tournament hat-trick, scored by Bert Patenaude against Paraguay.

Qualified for the semi-finals, the US played Argentina. A Monti goal halfway through the first half gave Argentina a 1–0 half-time lead. In the second half the strength of the United States team was overwhelmed by the pace of the Argentinian attacks, and lost 6–1.

The now-traditional match for third place was not established until 1934. A FIFA technical committee report on the 1986 World Cup included full retrospective rankings of all teams at all previous World Cup finals; this report ranked the United States third.

=== 1934: The only one World Cup match ===
32 countries applied to enter the tournament, so qualifying matches were required to thin the field to 16. Haiti hosted Cuba for three that would send the winner to face Mexico, and Cuba advanced with two wins and one draw. Mexico defeated Cuba thrice at home to contest the sole CONCACAF spot against the United States. The qualifying match happened only three days before the start of the tournament in Rome, which the United States won.

The United States lost their only match to hosts and eventual champions Italy in a 7–1 blowout; the New York Times correspondent wrote that "only the fine goal-tending of Julius Hjulian of Chicago kept the score as low as it was".

=== 1938: Cuba reaches the Quarter-final ===
It was originally intended that the World Cup would be held alternately between the continents of South America and Europe. However Jules Rimet, the creator of the World Cup, convinced FIFA to hold the competition in France, his home country. Because of this controversy, many American countries, including Argentina (the most likely hosts if the event was held in South America), Colombia, Costa Rica, El Salvador, Mexico, Dutch Guyana, Uruguay, and the United States all withdrew or refused to enter so Cuba qualified automatically.

Five of the first round matches required extra time to break the deadlock; two games still went to a replay. In one replay, Cuba advanced to the next round at the expense of Romania 2–1. Sweden advanced directly to the quarter-finals as a result of Austria's withdrawal, and they proceeded to beat Cuba 8–0.

=== 1950: The Miracle Match ===
In the 1950 World Cup qualification, only three countries of CONCACAF took part in the qualifier for two spots. Mexico and the United States qualified over Cuba. Mexico took part in the opening match, losing 4–0 to hosts Brazil, and also lost to Yugoslavia (4–1) and Switzerland (2–1). The United States, with a hastily assembled team of semiprofessional players, lost to Spain 3–1 before defeating England 1–0 in a group match that is largely considered the greatest upset in World Cup history. Another loss by 2–5 to Chile ended the U.S. Team campaign.

=== 1954: Mexico has a short World Cup ===
In the 1954 World Cup qualification, Mexico, United States and Haiti disputed one qualifying spot. Mexico won. The 1954 tournament used a unique format, where after dividing the sixteen teams in four groups, the seeded teams did not play each other, as did the non-seeds. Thus Mexico did not have to play fellow non-seeded team Yugoslavia, and lost to seeds Brazil and France. Mexico finished thirteenth overall.

=== 1958: Mexico does not host, but plays the World Cup ===
Mexico expressed interest in hosting the tournament, but Sweden was eventually chosen at the FIFA Congress held in Rio de Janeiro around the opening of the 1950 FIFA World Cup. In the 1958 World Cup qualification, six CONCACAF teams played for one spot, again won by Mexico. For the third time Mexico took part in the opening match, losing 4–0 to hosts Sweden. Afterwards they drew 1–1 Wales to win their first point in World Cup history, and lost 4–0 to Hungary in Sandviken, in what became the northernmost World Cup match in history. Mexico finished last overall among all sixteen teams.

=== 1962: Mexico's first victory at the World Cup ===
In the 1962 World Cup qualification, seven countries played for the sole CONCACAF spot, again won by Mexico, who then advanced to the CONMEBOL/CCCF/NAFC Intercontinental Play-off. Mexico beat Paraguay 1–0 in Mexico City and qualified for their fourth consecutive World Cup. In their group, Mexico lost to defending (and eventual) champions Brazil 0–2, as well as 0–1 to Spain. However, Mexico managed to get their first ever win at the World Cup by beating Czechoslovakia (who wound up being the tournament runners-up) 3–1. In the overall rankings, Mexico was eleventh.

=== 1966: Mexico drew twice but eliminated ===
In the 1966 World Cup qualification, nine countries of CONCACAF disputed one qualifying spot. Mexico won the qualification and got to their fifth consecutive World Cup. In the group stage, Mexico drew 1–1 France, lost 0–2 to host England, and drew 0–0 with Uruguay. Mexico finished as twelfth overall. The tournament also allowed goalkeeper Antonio Carbajal to become the first player to take part in five consecutive World Cups, a feat only matched by Germany's Lothar Matthäus in 1998. Carbajal also became the goalkeeper with the most goals conceded with 25, tied by Saudi Arabian Mohammed Al-Deayea in 2002 (though Carbajal played 14 matches in 5 tournaments, while al-Deayea was in 10 games across 3 Cups).

=== 1970: North America hosts the World Cup, El Salvador's first World Cup ===
The 1970 FIFA World Cup, the ninth staging of the World Cup, was held in Mexico, from 31 May to 21 June. The 1970 tournament was the first World Cup hosted in North America, and the first held outside South America and Europe. Mexico was chosen as the host nation by FIFA in Tokyo, Japan on 8 October 1964, over opposition from Argentina. Along with Mexico, another CONCACAF spot was reserved to the winner of the qualifiers. El Salvador beat 11 other countries to make their debut. Both CONCACAF teams wound up drawn in the same group.

In Group 1, hosts Mexico lived up to the expectations of an entire nation by advancing along with the Soviet Union. This was the first time in seven World Cup tournaments that Mexico had progressed from the initial stage. Mexico drew 0–0 USSR in the tournament's opening match, won 4–0 El Salvador, won 1–0 Belgium. El Salvador lost all 3 games, finishing last overall with 9 goals against and none scored.

The quarter-finals saw a transformed Italy prevail 4–1 over Mexico after trailing 0–1. The host took the lead against Italy with a José González goal, but his teammate Gustavo Pena equalized with an own goal before half-time. Italy then took over, and dominated the second half. Two goals from Luigi Riva and one from Gianni Rivera saw them go through 4–1. Mexico finished sixth overall.

=== 1974: Haiti's first World Cup ===
The North, Central American and Caribbean zone was allocated 1 place (out of 16) in the World Cup. The qualifiers would be concurrent to the 1973 CONCACAF Championship. Host country Haiti won the tournament and the berth to West Germany '74. Haiti did not do particularly well in their first World Cup finals, losing all three games, but they did have one moment of glory. In their opening game against Italy, they managed to take the lead with a goal from Emmanuel Sanon, before eventually losing 3–1. Italy had not conceded a goal in 12 international matches, and it ended Dino Zoff's run of 1142 minutes without conceding a goal. Haiti finished second-to-last at 15th place overall.

=== 1978: Mexico's early exit ===
The North, Central American and Caribbean zone was allocated 1 place (out of 16) in the World Cup. In the 1978 World Cup qualification participated 16 countries of CONCACAF. Mexico won, qualifying in Argentina '78. Mexico suffered an early exit after three defeats: 1–3 against Tunisia (the first victory by an African team), 0–6 against West Germany, and 1–3 to Poland. Again Mexico was 16th and last overall.

=== 1982: Honduras' first World Cup ===
For the first time, the World Cup finals expanded from 16 to 24 teams. The North, Central American and Caribbean zone was allocated two places (out of 24) in the final tournament. A total of 15 CONCACAF teams entered the qualification. This edition was marked by an upset as Mexico, traditional CONCACAF heavyweights and needing a win to go through, were eliminated by Honduras. The 0–0 tie between Mexico and Honduras qualified El Salvador to participate in the World Cup as the CONCACAF runners-up. El Salvador also became the first Central American team to qualify for more than one World Cup (a record that has been broken by Costa Rica).

El Salvador in their first match on June 15 in Elche, they were defeated 10–1 by Hungary, a scoreline that stands as a World Cup record to this day. One comfort was that Luis Baltazar Ramírez Zapata scored the country's first World Cup goal during the game, albeit at a point when the Salvadorans were already down 5–0. El Salvador managed to regain some pride in their subsequent games: displaying much-improved levels of organisation and commitment, they lost 1–0 to Belgium on June 19 in Elche and 2–0 to the then-reigning world champions, Argentina, in Alicante on June 23. At the ranking remained the last 24 place.

Honduras drew against Spain and Northern Ireland 1–1, and while trying to qualify with a third draw against Yugoslavia, a penalty in the final minutes lead to a 0–1 defeat. Honduras finished 18th overall.

=== 1986: The second World Cup in Mexico, Mexican wave, Canada's debut ===
The 13th FIFA World Cup was originally to be held in Colombia, However, the Colombian authorities eventually declared in November 1982 that they could not afford to host the World Cup under the terms that FIFA demanded because of economic concerns. Mexico was selected on 20 May 1983 as the replacement hosts, beating the bids of Canada and the United States (who eventually hosted the 1994 World Cup), and became the first nation to host two World Cups. The 1986 World Cup saw the appearance of the phenomenon dubbed the Mexican wave, which was popularized worldwide after featuring during the tournament. The North, Central American and Caribbean zone was allocated 2 places (out of 24) in the final tournament. Mexico, the World Cup host, qualified automatically. A total of 16 CONCACAF teams entered the qualification. Canada earned clinched qualification on 14 September 1985 to participate in their first ever World Cup after beating Honduras 2–1.

In Group B Mexico beat Belgium 2–1, and despite being held 1–1 by Paraguay, they won the group after a further win over Iraq, 1–0. With this performance, Mexico won the top spot in its group and advanced to the next round where Mexico faced Bulgaria in a 2–0 win. In the quarter-finals stage, Mexico held West Germany to 0–0 on regular time and overtime, before losing 1–4 in the penalty shoot-out with goal-keeper Harald Schumacher saving two penalties. Mexico repeated the 6th place from 1970.

At the 1986 FIFA World Cup, Canada impressed defensively in their first game, allowing few chances and conceding a late Jean-Pierre Papin goal to lose to France 0–1. They lost their next two matches to both Hungary and the USSR 0–2, however, to finish at the bottom of their group and last overall at 24th.

=== 1990: United States returns to the World Cup, Costa Rica reaches the Round of 16 ===
A total of 16 CONCACAF teams entered the qualification. Mexico was disqualified from the 1990 FIFA World Cup (and any other international competition) after using players over the age limit allowed by FIFA in the qualifying round for the 1989 FIFA World Youth Championship. The punishment originally was only going to be applied to the FIFA World Youth team and not the World Cup or Olympic Games team, but the penalty was applied to all Mexico national representatives of all FIFA-sanctioned tournaments. Costa Rica along with the United States, qualified for the 1990 FIFA World Cup. Costa Rica qualified for the first time. Returning after long absences were the United States, who competed for the first time since 1950. For the 1990 World Cup in Italy, two of the team's more experienced players, Rick Davis and Hugo Perez, were recovering from serious injuries and unavailable for selection, and manager Bob Gansler selected many inexperienced players and recent college graduates. The U.S. lost all three games to Czechoslovakia, Italy and Austria. At the ranking remained the 23 place. Costa Rica beat Scotland 1–0 in their first match, lost 1–0 to Brazil in their second, then saw off Sweden 2–1 to claim a place in the second round. Costa Rica were comfortably beaten 4–1 by Czechoslovakia. Costa Rica ranked in twelfth place in the tournament.

=== 1994: United States hosts the World Cup ===
The 1994 FIFA World Cup was held in nine cities across the United States. The United States was chosen as the host by FIFA on 4 July 1988. Average attendance was 69,000, a record which still stands today (no other FIFA World Cup has exceeded 53,000 average attendance). The total attendance of nearly 3.6 million for the final tournament remains the highest in World Cup history, despite the expansion of the competition from 24 to 32 teams (and from 52 to 64 matches) in the 1998 World Cup. A total of 23 CONCACAF teams entered the qualification. The North, Central American and Caribbean zone was allocated 2.25 places (out of 24) in the final tournament. In the final Round Mexico qualified as the first team, Canada advanced to the CONCACAF–OFC play-off. The aggregate score was tied at 3–3, however Australia advanced 4–1 on penalties. U.S. opened its tournament schedule with a 1–1 draw against Switzerland in the Pontiac Silverdome in the suburbs of Detroit, the first World Cup game played indoors. In its second game, the U.S. faced Colombia, then ranked fourth in the world, at the Rose Bowl. Aided by an own goal from Andrés Escobar, the United States won 2–1. (Escobar was later murdered in his home country, possibly in retaliation for this mistake. ) Despite a 1–0 loss to Romania in its final group game, the U.S. made it to the knockout round for the first time since 1930. The hosts advanced to the second round as one of the best third-place teams. They played and, despite a 1–0 defeat, to the eventual champion Brazil. United States' performance was considered a great success . At the ranking remained the 14 place. Mexico went on to win group on tiebreakers, emerging to the eventual champion Brazil from the tournament's "Group of death", composed of Mexico, Italy, Ireland, and Norway. However, Mexico eventually lost 1–1 (pen. 1–3) in the second round to Bulgaria. Miguel Mejía Barón led this team into one of its most distinguished performances in a World Cup. At the ranking remained the 13 place.

=== 1998: Jamaica's first World Cup ===
For the first time in the competition, the group-stages were expanded from 24 teams to 32. CONCACAF zone determine the three CONCACAF representatives at the 1998 FIFA World Cup. A total of 30 CONCACAF teams entered the competition. Mexico, the United States, and Jamaica qualified for the World Cup. Jamaica qualified first time for the World Cup. Jamaica ended in Group H, along with Argentina, Croatia, and Japan. Their first game was a 3–1 defeat to Croatia in Lens, with Robbie Earle scoring Jamaica's goal. It was followed by a 5–0 defeat to Argentina at Paris' Parc des Princes. Jamaica ended its participation with a 2–1 victory over Japan in Lyon, with Theodore Whitmore scoring both goals. The team finished 22nd out of the 32 teams. In the 1998 World Cup in France, US team lost all three group matches, 2–0 to Germany, 2–1 to Iran, and 1–0 to Yugoslavia, and so finished in last place in both its group and the overall tournament. Head coach Steve Sampson received much of the blame for the performance as a result of abruptly cutting team captain John Harkes, whom Sampson had ironically named "Captain for Life" shortly before, as well as several other players who were instrumental to the qualifying effort, from the squad. It emerged in February 2010 that Sampson removed Harkes from the team due to Harkes allegedly having an affair with teammate Eric Wynalda's wife. Mexico was placed in Group E, with the Netherlands, Korea Republic and Belgium. Mexico started against Korea Republic losing 0–1 but came back to win 3–1. Belgium had started beating Mexico 2–0 but they came back to tie 2–2. The third game against Netherlands ended in another 2–2 result which resulted in qualification to the Round of 16. In the next round, Mexico faced Germany. Although having the lead Mexico did not manage to hold onto it and lost the game 2–1, finishing 13th overall.

=== 2002: The North American derby ===
A total of 35 CONCACAF teams entered the qualification. Mexico, the United States, and Costa Rica qualified for the World Cup. Costa Rica's results were mixed, soundly beating the selection of China 2–0 before losing to eventual champions Brazil 5–2 (only team to score 2 goals against Brazil at this World Cup) and tying with eventual bronze medalist Turkey 1–1, leading the Turks to get the group's second spot on goal difference. The team finished 19 out of the 32 teams. Mexico opened its participation with a 1–0 win over Croatia, and afterwards earned a 2–1 win over Ecuador with goals from Jared Borgetti and Gerardo Torrado. Mexico then achieved a 1–1 draw against Italy thanks to a goal from Borgetti that was regarded as one of the best of the tournament, and managed to win the group. The United States reached the knockout stage with a 1–1–1 record, starting with a surprising 3–2 win over Portugal, followed by a 1–1 tie with co-host and eventual fourth-place finisher, South Korea. It then lost its third and final match 1–3 to Poland but still qualified for the second round when Park Ji-Sung of South Korea stunned Portugal with the eventual game-winning goal. This set the stage for a second round face-off with familiar continental rivals Mexico. Although the teams had played many times in both friendlies and in qualifying, they had never met in the World Cup. The U.S. would win the game 2–0. Brian McBride opened the scoring early in the match and Landon Donovan scored a second goal from a header off an Eddie Lewis cross. Mexico finished 11 out of the 32 teams. United States advanced to the quarter-finals, where they met Germany. The team lost 1–0; after being denied a penalty when Torsten Frings handled the ball to prevent a Gregg Berhalter goal. The Americans finished the cup 8th overall.

=== 2006: Mexico moves on again, Trinidad and Tobago debut at the World Cup ===
A total of 34 teams took part competing for 3.5 places in the World Cup. Mexico, the United States, and Costa Rica qualified at once for the World Cup. Trinidad and Tobago advanced to the AFC-CONCACAF play-off. Trinidad and Tobago was awarded a place in 2006 FIFA World Cup after winning the playoff 2–1 on aggregate against Bahrain, managing its first appearance in the finals. Costa Rica made its debut in the opening match in Munich against the host Germany, losing the match 4–2. However, the good performance in that game did not translate over to the other games, where they fell 0–3 against Ecuador, and 1–2 against Poland, to finish penultimate among all 32 teams.

Put into group B, Trinidad and Tobago opened holding down a scoreless 0-0 against Sweden, but then lost to both England and Paraguay 2-0, eliminated without scoring a single goal. Its final position was 17th overall.

Mexico was one of eight seeded teams in the first round, leading Group D with Iran, Angola and Portugal. Mexico won their opening match 3–1 against Iran, with two goals from Omar Bravo and one by Sinha. In their second match, Mexico played to a 0–0 draw against Angola. Mexico joined Portugal as a qualifier in the Round of 16, despite losing to the Portuguese 2–1, in a game where Bravo missed a penalty. In the second round, Mexico played against Argentina. Mexico scored in the 5th minute with a goal by captain Rafael Márquez assisted by Pável Pardo. Four minutes later, Argentina equalized the match thanks to an own goal from Jared Borgetti. The score remained 1–1 after ninety minutes, and in extra time, a volley by Maxi Rodríguez in the second period of extra time brought about a 2–1 win for Argentina. Its final ranking was 15th place.

The United States were drawn into Group E, and opened its tournament with a 3–0 loss to the Czech Republic. The team then drew 1–1 against Italy, thanks to an own goal from Zaccardo, ending up being the only opponent together along with France the Italian side failed to defeat in the tournament (officially, according to FIFA, France and Italy drew 1–1, although Italy won the tournament after a penalty shoot out). The United States was then knocked out of the tournament when beaten 2–1 by Ghana in its final group match, with Clint Dempsey scoring their only goal in the tournament. The team finished 25 out of the 32 teams.

=== 2010: Mexico and the United States qualify, Honduras returned to the World Cup ===
A total of 35 teams took part competing for 3.5 places in the World Cup. Mexico, the United States, and Honduras qualified at once for the World Cup. The fourth-place finisher, Costa Rica, played a two-game playoff with the CONMEBOL fifth-place finisher, Uruguay, for a possible fourth berth. Costa Rica lost 1–2 on aggregate and not qualified for the 2010 FIFA World Cup. United States after tying (drawing) matches against England (1–1) and Slovenia (2–2), the US defeated Algeria through a Landon Donovan stoppage time goal and thus won the game, the first time that the US has won its group since 1930. In the round of 16, the US lost to Ghana, with Ghana once again winning 2–1, thus resulting in the elimination of the US from the World Cup. US finished in 12th place. Mexico was drawn into Group A along with the host South Africa, France and Uruguay. In the first match of the tournament they drew 1–1 against the host South Africa with a late strike from Rafael Márquez. The second match was against France, whom they defeated 2–0 thanks to a strike from Javier Hernández and a penalty by Cuauhtémoc Blanco, who with this goal became the first Mexico player ever to score in three different World Cups. Their last group game was against Uruguay with both teams needing just a draw to advance however Mexico were defeated 1–0 but still advance to the Round of 16 thanks to a better goal differential than South Africa. In the second round, Mexico faced Argentina in a rematch of their Round of 16 loss at the hands of the Argentine team four years earlier. Mexico fell behind when a controversial goal was scored by Carlos Tevez in offside position, in which the Argentine team were clearly positioned offside, noticed by a linesman who urged the referee to discount the goal but it was declared a fair play. Gonzalo Higuaín scored later when Ricardo Osorio accidentally pushed the ball in front of Higuain while passing it to a teammate then tripping, giving Higuain a chance to go and score a second for Argentina. Tévez later on scored on a shot where he was not marked by anyone, giving Argentina a 3-goal lead before Javier Hernández scored what was considered the best goal of the match, in which he took on 3 defenders before scoring between the post and the goalkeeper on the left edge of the box for what would be Mexico's only goal for the match. For the fifth straight World Cup, Mexico was eliminated in the Round of 16 as a result of their 1–3 defeat. The team finished 14 out of the 32 teams. Honduras faced Chile, Spain, and Switzerland, respectively. In their first match they lost to Chile 0–1 by a goal from Jean Beausejour. They faced Spain in the second match and lost 0–2 by 2 goals from David Villa. In their last match against Switzerland they got a draw and finished the World Cup with 1 point. The team finished 30 out of the 32 teams.

=== 2014: Costa Rica surprises, three CONCACAF teams in the knockout round ===
In the CONCACAF qualifiers for the 2014 FIFA World Cup, the United States, Costa Rica and Honduras qualified directly, while an underwhelming campaign by Mexico sent them to a playoff with New Zealand, the top team from Oceania. Mexico disposed of New Zealand 9–3 on aggregate over 2 games to mark the second tournament with four teams from North and Central America.

For the first time three CONCACAF teams qualified for the knockout rounds. The exception was Honduras, who lost all three games.

Mexico managed to get their sixth consecutive qualification to the knockout rounds under the solid goalkeeping of Guillermo Ochoa, who conceded only one goal in the group stage. In the Round of 16 against the Netherlands, Mexico opened the score with Giovani dos Santos, but conceded two goals in the final minutes for another early exit. Rafael Márquez became both the most capped Mexico player with 16 World Cup matches, and also became the first player to serve as team captain in four different tournaments.

Underdogs Costa Rica had their best tournament performance ever led by goalkeeper Keylor Navas. While experts did not expect the Central American team to survive a "group of death" featuring three former World Cup winners, Costa Rica beat both Uruguay and Italy before drawing England, finishing first on its group. Facing Greece in the round of 16, Bryan Ruiz opened the score, but Sokratis Papastathopoulos tied on injury time. Despite having one less player Los Ticos held the tie on overtime, and Navas saved two of the Greek penalty kicks to send Costa Rica to the quarter-finals. Facing the Netherlands, Navas kept the score 0–0 until the penalties. Dutch goalkeeper Tim Krul saved two kicks to eliminate Costa Rica, who still ended undefeated and with the less goals taken.

Facing Ghana for the third consecutive World Cup, the United States finally defeated the African team, with the first goal of the 2–1 victory being scored by Clint Dempsey with less than thirty seconds of playtime. The U.S. team then conceded a 2–2 draw to Portugal on injury time, and qualified despite a 1–0 defeat to Germany. Facing Belgium in the Round of 16, goalkeeper Tim Howard made a record of 16 saves to send the game into overtime, where the Belgians won 2–1.

=== 2018: Panama goes to the World Cup ===
In the CONCACAF qualifiers for the 2018 FIFA World Cup, Mexico, Costa Rica, and Panama qualified directly, while Honduras was forced to enter a playoff against Australia after finishing fourth in the final round. Both Honduras and the United States failed to qualify for the main tournament; the latter country failed to do so for the first time since 1986. Panama lost all three games, including the biggest loss of the tournament in a 6-1 against England. Costa Rica's two defeats made it enter the last round already eliminated, yet managed to leave with a 2-2 tie to Switzerland once goalkeeper Yann Sommer scored an own goal at injury time. Mexico upset defending champions Germany and beat South Korea to continue its streak of playoff appearances, losing in its seventh straight Round of 16 in a 2-0 defeat to Brazil.

=== 2022: The "Big Three" and Canada ===
Mexico, the United States, and Costa Rica would go straight to the third round while Canada would compete in the first and second rounds, where they prevailed. In the octogonal, Mexico, the United States, Canada would qualify as the top three teams, making it the first time since 1986 that Canada qualified for the World Cup. Other CONCACAF giant, Costa Rica, would be forced to play against New Zealand in the playoffs, where they would win.

During the group stage, Costa Rica, Canada, and Mexico struggled heavily. Costa Rica lost to Spain on the first day in a 7–0 shutout and managed to get their only win (1–0) against Japan before losing to Germany 4–2. Canada would lose all of their games against Belgium (1–0), Croatia (4–1), and Morocco (2–1), finishing 31st, though they have seen the tournament as successful in reviving soccer in the country. Mexico would start the tournament with a tie against Poland before losing 2–0 to Argentina. They would manage to win 2–1 against Saudi Arabia, but because of a -1 goal differential against Poland, they would be eliminated. The United States managed to have a successful run in the group stage, tying with Wales and England before beating Iran 1–0 in an extremely tense match. During the Round of 16, the United States' run would come to an end as they lost 3–1 to the Netherlands.

=== 2026: Canada, the United States and Mexico host the tournament ===
For the 2026 edition, Canada, the United States and Mexico are hosting the tournament. Three other CONCACAF teams made it through the qualifiers, Panama getting its second World Cup appearance after being the first team out of the 2022 qualifying zone, Haiti returning 52 years after their debut, and Curaçao qualifying for the first time. Canada managed its first good run, drawing Bosnia 1–1 and shutting out Qatar 6–0, and in spite of finishing with a 2–1 loss to Switzerland still managed to enter the knockout rounds in second place. The other two hosts also managed at least one large victory, with the United States starting its campaign beating Paraguay 4–1 and Mexico finishing the group stage with 3–0 over the Czech Republic, the Mexicans also managing to win all three games of the group stage for the first time, and pass in first place for the first time since 2002.

Curaçao managed to equalize after Germany opened the score, only to afterwards suffer a blowout 7–1 loss. The team then managed a 0–0 tie with Ecuador thanks to 15 saves from goalkeeper Eloy Room, but were eliminated losing 3–0 to the Ivory Coast. Haiti and Panama lost all three games, and the latter had the negative distinction of being the only team not scoring any goals during the tournament.

During the new Round of 32, the three hosts beat their adversaries, Canada scoring against South Africa on the closing minutes of stoppage time, and both Mexico vs. Ecuador and United States vs. Bosnia ended 2–0. They subsequently fell out during the round of 16 in big losses receiving at least three goals, Canada 0–3 Morocco, Mexico 2–3 England and United States 1–4 Belgium.
