= Galaxy F.C. =

Galaxy Futsal Club
- Full name: Galaxy Futsal Club
- Nickname(s): Galaxy
- Founded: 2014
- Stadium: Carrara Indoor Stadium
- Capacity: 2,992
- Chairmen: Armando Cacace; Andrew Parkes
- Coach: Brad Spokes
- League: F-League
- Website: http://www.galaxyfutsal.com
Home colours	Away colours

Galaxy Futsal Club is an Australian futsal club based in Gold Coast, Queensland. They play in the F-League which is the top tier of Australian Futsal. Galaxy FC was founded in late 2014 by Armando Cacace and Andrew Parkes.

== History ==
Galaxy FC is a founded entity that will compete in the FFA F- League. Galaxy FC is a representative based club which has amalgamated four of the elite clubs in the QLD and NSW Regions. - Gold Coast Futsal - Just Futsal NSW - Brisbane Magic Futsal - Bundaberg Futsal The four existing and well established clubs have pooled both talent and resources in order to form a new Futsal F League club.

== Notable players ==
- Roger Cua (Australia Futsalroos representative)
- Lucas Osorio Silva (New Zealand Futsal Whites representative)
- James Egeta (Solomon Islands Kurukuru representative)
- Renagi Ingram (Australia Futsalroos representative)

== Notable Coaches ==
- Bruno Cannavan (Brazilian Coach - one of the most successful coaches in Australia) 2015-2018
- Vinicius Leite (Brazilian Coach - Current Solomon Islands National Team Coach) 2019-

== Current squad ==
Note: Flags indicate national team as defined under FIFA eligibility rules; some limited exceptions apply. Players may hold more than one non-FIFA nationality.

No.	Pos.	Nation	Player
1	GK	(Australia) AUS	James Weidmann
33	DF	(Australia) AUS	Arlo Hook
14	DF	(Australia) AUS	Tal Galper
8	DF	(Australia) AUS	Brett Richardson

No.	Pos.	Nation	Player
13	MF	(Japan) JPN	Ryo Yazawa
18	MF	(Australia) AUS	Samin Rohani
84	MF	(Brazil) BRA	Vinicius Leite
11	MF	(Brazil) BRA	Andre Rodrigues
15	FW	(Australia) AUS	Gerardo Soto
17	FW	(Australia) AUS	Tuan Cao
61	MF	(Australia) AUS	Jayden Bordin

== Club Honours ==
=== Regional competitions ===
- SEQ Premier League: 3 (2017, 2018, 2019)
- Qld Superliga Draft League: 1 (2020)
- Victorian State Futsal Championships: 4 (2016, 2017, 2018, 2019)

=== National competitions ===
- F-League: 2 (2015, 2016)

=== International competitions ===
- Craig Foster International: 4 (2015, 2016, 2017, 2018)
- Gold Coast International: 2 (2019, 2020)
- Lismore International Cup: 4 (2015, 2016, 2017, 2018)
- New Zealand Futsal Nationals: 3 (2016, 2017, 2018,)
- World Futsal Championship | Barcelona, Spain: 3 (2016, 2017, 2018,)
- Kobe Futsal Festival | Osaka, Japan: 1 (2017)
- World Club Futsal Championship | Orlando, USA: 3 (2016, 2017, 2018,)

== Coaching staff ==
Galaxy F.C. staff
Front office: President – Armando Cacace; Chairman/CEO – Andrew Parkes; Regional Development Officer – James Cairney; Head coaches: Men's Head Coach – Vinicius Leite; Women's Head Coach – Vinicius De Olivera; Strength and Conditioning Trainer – Alexandre Argolo; Sports Trainer – Caroline Drummond
