= 1967 CONCACAF Championship squads =

These are the squads for the countries that played in the 1967 CONCACAF Championship.

The age listed for each player is on 5 March 1967, the first day of the tournament. The numbers of caps and goals listed for each player do not include any matches played after the start of the tournament. The club listed is the club for which the player last played a competitive match before the tournament. The nationality for each club reflects the national association (not the league) to which the club is affiliated. A flag is included for coaches who are of a different nationality than their own national team.

Nicaragua had two players represent foreign clubs.

== Guatemala ==
Head Coach: (Uruguay) Rubén Amorín

No.	Pos.	Player	Date of birth (age)	Caps	Club
1	GK	Julio Rodolfo García	23 November 1945 (aged 21)		(Guatemala) Municipal
2	GK	Guillermo Gamboa	8 April 1936 (aged 30)		(Guatemala) Comunicaciones
3	GK	Ignacio González Lam	2 April 1944 (aged 22)		(Guatemala) Municipal
4	DF	Alberto López Oliva	10 May 1944 (aged 22)		(Guatemala) Municipal
5	DF	Lijon León	19 April 1943 (aged 23)		(Guatemala) Aurora
6	DF	Henry Berrisford Stokes	23 January 1943 (aged 24)		(Guatemala) Universidad de San Carlos
7	DF	David Molina Rodríguez	1 February 1943 (aged 24)		(Guatemala) Aurora
8	DF	Roberto Ochoa	17 April 1945 (aged 21)		(Guatemala) Aurora
9	DF	Horacio Hasse	13 July 1945 (aged 21)		(Guatemala) Municipal
10	DF	René de León	15 May 1940 (aged 26)		(Guatemala) Aurora
11	MF	Jorge Roldán	16 December 1940 (aged 26)		(Guatemala) Aurora
12	MF	Hugo Torres	9 July 1945 (aged 21)		(Guatemala) Aurora
13	MF	Rolando Valdez	22 May 1945 (aged 21)		(Guatemala) Municipal
14	MF	Jorge Hurtarte	23 April 1944 (aged 22)		(Guatemala) Universidad de San Carlos
15	MF	Jerry Slusher	7 November 1944 (aged 22)		(Guatemala) Suchitepéquez
16	MF	Haroldo Cordón	15 April 1939 (aged 27)		(Guatemala) Aurora
17	MF	Marco Fión	17 January 1947 (aged 20)		(Guatemala) Tipografía Nacional
18	MF	Eduardo de León	30 October 1933 (aged 33)		(Guatemala) Universidad de San Carlos
19	FW	Hugo Peña	6 May 1936 (aged 30)		(Guatemala) Aurora
20	FW	Nelson Melgar	22 July 1945 (aged 21)		(Guatemala) Comunicaciones
21	FW	Manuel Recinos	4 February 1944 (aged 23)		(Guatemala) Aurora
22	FW	José Rafael Godoy	15 May 1942 (aged 24)		(Guatemala) Municipal
23	FW	Daniel Salamanca	20 January 1939 (aged 28)		(Guatemala) Municipal

== Haiti ==
Head coach: Antoine Tassy

No.	Pos.	Player	Date of birth (age)	Caps	Club
1	GK	Michel Blain			(Haiti) Aigle Noir
2	GK	Rafael Manoyrine			(Haiti) Racing Haïtien
3	DF	Claude Barthélemy	9 May 1945 (aged 21)		(Haiti) Racing Haïtien
4	DF	Arsène Auguste	3 February 1951 (aged 16)		(Haiti) Racing Haïtien
5	DF	Formose Gilles	22 October 1942 (aged 24)		(Haiti) Victory
6	DF	Michel Morin			(Haiti) Racing Haïtien
7	DF	Wilfrid Soray			(Haiti) Violette
8	DF	Wilson Thomas			(Haiti) Racing Haïtien
9	MF	Jean-Claude Désir	8 August 1946 (aged 20)		(Haiti) Aigle Noir
10	MF	Philippe Vorbe	14 September 1947 (aged 19)		(Haiti) Violette
11	MF	Joseph Obas	25 May 1940 (aged 26)		(Haiti) Racing Haïtien
12	MF	Bendel Elias			(Haiti) Violette
13	MF	Gabriel Fleury			(Haiti) Violette
14	MF	Claude Nemury			(Haiti) Racing Haïtien
15	FW	Guy Saint-Vil	21 October 1942 (aged 24)		(Haiti) Racing Haïtien
16	FW	Edner Breton			(Haiti) Racing Haïtien
17	FW	Leintz Domingue	January 1945 (aged 22)		(Haiti) Victory
18	FW	Joseph Pierre			(Haiti) Violette
19	FW	Fritz Metellus			(Haiti) Aigle Noir
20	FW	Hughes Guillaume			(Haiti) Aigle Noir
21	FW	Jean Marie Jourdain			(Haiti) Racing Haïtien
22	FW	Herve Brice			(Haiti) Etoile Haïtienne

== Honduras ==
Head coach: (Chile) Sergio Lecea

No.	Pos.	Player	Date of birth (age)	Caps	Club
1	GK	Crisanto Norales	1 December 1937 (aged 29)		(Honduras) Olimpia
2	GK	Ricardo Cárdenas	1940 (aged 26–27)		(Honduras) Motagua
3	GK	Joe Hendricks			(Honduras) Vida
4	DF	Rafael Dick	25 July 1942 (aged 24)		(Honduras) Olimpia
5	DF	Jorge Deras			(Honduras) Marathón
6	DF	Roosvelth Garbuth			(Honduras) Platense
7	DF	José Shubert			(Honduras) Marathón
8	DF	Luis Bejarano			(Honduras) San Pedro
9	DF	Lenard Welsh	1936 (aged 30–31)		(Honduras) Motagua
10	DF	Roberto Güity	27 March 1934 (aged 32)		(Honduras) Atlético Indio
11	DF	Nilmo Edwards			(Honduras) Vida
12	MF	Carlos Suazo	8 March 1936 (aged 30)		(Honduras) Olimpia
13	MF	Mauro Caballero			(Honduras) Marathón
14	MF	Marco Antonio Mendoza	1947 (aged 19–20)		(Honduras) Olimpia
15	MF	Roberto Valentine			(Honduras) Real España
16	FW	Donaldo Rosales	3 March 1939 (aged 28)		(Honduras) Olimpia
17	FW	Conrado Flores	10 November 1942 (aged 24)		(Honduras) Olimpia
18	FW	Raúl Suazo	19 September 1944 (aged 22)		(Honduras) Olimpia
19	FW	Lolo Cruz			(Honduras) Real España
20	FW	Mario Caballero	23 August 1943 (aged 23)		(Honduras) Marathón
21	FW	Julio Fonseca	3 October 1945 (aged 21)		(Honduras) Marathón
22	FW	Thomas Máximo			(Honduras) Platense
23	FW	Enrique Grey Fúnez	12 May 1942 (aged 24)		(Honduras) San Pedro

== Mexico ==
Head coach: Ignacio Trelles

No.	Pos.	Player	Date of birth (age)	Caps	Club
1	GK	Javier Vargas Rueda	22 November 1941 (aged 25)		(Mexico) Atlas
2	GK	Gilberto Rodríguez Rivera	6 May 1943 (aged 23)		(Mexico) Guadalajara
3	DF	Juan Manuel Alejandrez	17 May 1944 (aged 22)		(Mexico) Cruz Azul
4	DF	Gustavo Peña	22 November 1942 (aged 24)		(Mexico) Oro
5	DF	Mario Pérez	30 July 1946 (aged 20)		(Mexico) Necaxa
6	DF	Jesús del Muro	30 November 1937 (aged 29)		(Mexico) Cruz Azul
7	DF	Carlos Albert	10 July 1943 (aged 23)		(Mexico) Necaxa
8	DF	Fernando Cuenca	7 April 1939 (aged 27)		(Mexico) América
9	DF	Gamaliel Ramírez	20 May 1946 (aged 20)		(Mexico) Atlas
10	MF	Héctor Pulido	20 December 1942 (aged 24)		(Mexico) Cruz Azul
11	MF	Felipe Ruvalcaba	16 February 1941 (aged 26)		(Mexico) Oro
12	MF	Luis Regueiro	22 December 1943 (aged 23)		(Mexico) UNAM
13	MF	Raúl Arellano	18 January 1939 (aged 28)		(Mexico) Cruz Azul
14	MF	Jesús Prado	6 March 1946 (aged 21)		(Mexico) Cruz Azul
15	FW	Vicente Pereda	18 July 1941 (aged 25)		(Mexico) Toluca
16	FW	Luis Estrada	8 July 1948 (aged 18)		(Mexico) León
17	FW	Fernando Bustos	1 August 1944 (aged 22)		(Mexico) Cruz Azul
18	FW	Cesáreo Victorino	8 February 1948 (aged 19)		(Mexico) Cruz Azul
19	FW	Manuel Lapuente	15 May 1944 (aged 22)		(Mexico) Necaxa
20	FW	José Luis Guerrero	24 August 1945 (aged 21)		(Mexico) Cruz Azul
21	FW	Manuel Cerda Canela	19 April 1945 (aged 21)		(Mexico) Toluca
22	FW	Juan González Martínez	4 January 1945 (aged 22)		(Mexico) Monterrey

== Nicaragua ==
Coach: Livio Bendaña

No.	Pos.	Player	Date of birth (age)	Caps	Club
1	GK	Roger Mayorga	10 July 1946 (aged 20)		(Guatemala) Aurora
2	GK	Salvador Dubois	16 August 1935 (aged 31)		(Honduras) Motagua
3	GK	Gerardo Meza			(Nicaragua)
4	DF	Miguel Buitrago	7 April 1941 (aged 25)		(Nicaragua) Universidad Centroamericana
5	DF	Dámaso Silva	7 December 1937 (aged 29)		(Nicaragua) Santa Cecilia
6	DF	Vladimir Tapia			(Nicaragua) Diriangén
7	DF	Emerson Flores			(Nicaragua) Diriangén
8	DF	Gilberto Mendoza Blanco			(Nicaragua)
9	MF	Manuel Flores Hernández			(Nicaragua) Diriangén
10	MF	Manuel Cuadra	25 August 1947 (aged 19)		(Nicaragua) Diriangén
11	MF	Hugo Huete	18 June 1939 (aged 27)		(Nicaragua)
12	MF	Pedro Jirón	18 December 1939 (aged 27)		(Nicaragua) Diriangén
13	MF	Emilio Gutiérrez Aguirre			(Nicaragua)
14	FW	Francisco Romero Ortega			(Nicaragua)
15	FW	Gerardo Barrios			(Nicaragua)
16	FW	René Rivas	4 June 1944 (aged 22)		(Nicaragua) Universidad Centroamericana
17	FW	Luis Orellana			(Nicaragua) Diriangén
18	FW	Arnald Góngora			(Nicaragua) Dínamo
19	FW	Oscar Calvo			(Nicaragua) Flor de Caña
20	FW	Rudy Sobalvarro			(Nicaragua)
21	FW	Carlos López			(Nicaragua)

== Trinidad and Tobago ==
Coach: Conrad Braithwaite

No.	Pos.	Player	Date of birth (age)	Caps	Club
1	GK	Lincoln Phillips	4 September 1941 (aged 25)		(Trinidad and Tobago) Regiment
2	GK	Jean Mouttet			(Trinidad and Tobago) Maple
3	DF	Lawrence Rondon	4 September 1949 (aged 17)		(Trinidad and Tobago) Saint Benedict's
4	DF	Tyrone de la Bastide	18 October 1938 (aged 28)		(Trinidad and Tobago) Maple
5	DF	Aldwin Ferguson	23 March 1935 (aged 31)		(Trinidad and Tobago) Maple
6	DF	Selwyn Murren	1945 (aged 21–22)		(Trinidad and Tobago)
7	DF	Hugh Mulzac			(Trinidad and Tobago)
8	DF	David Arnim			(Trinidad and Tobago)
9	MF	Sedley Joseph	4 December 1939 (aged 27)		(Trinidad and Tobago) Maple
10	MF	Victor Gamaldo	22 January 1944 (aged 23)		(Trinidad and Tobago) Regiment
11	MF	Bertrand Grell	22 August 1944 (aged 22)		(Trinidad and Tobago) Forest Reserve
12	MF	Ian de Bruine			(Trinidad and Tobago)
13	MF	David Devonish			(Trinidad and Tobago)
14	FW	Alvin Corneal	13 October 1937 (aged 29)		(Trinidad and Tobago) Maple
15	FW	Andrew Aleong	30 December 1943 (aged 23)		(Trinidad and Tobago) Maple
16	FW	Gerry Browne	9 December 1944 (aged 22)		(Trinidad and Tobago) Regiment
17	FW	Kelvin Berassa			(Trinidad and Tobago) Malvern
18	FW	Ellis Sadaphal			(Trinidad and Tobago) Maple
19	FW	Patrick Small			(Trinidad and Tobago)
20	FW	Jeff Gellineau			(Trinidad and Tobago)
21	FW	David McDeigan			(Trinidad and Tobago)
