= 1970–71 Club Puebla season =

Club Puebla
1970–71 season
- Owner: Leonardo Ortiz Gallegos
- Manager: Francisco González Gatica
- Stadium: Estadio Cuauhtémoc
- Primera División: 6th place (Group 2)
- Copa México: Round of 16
- Top goalscorer: Benito Pardo (20)
Home colours

The 1970–71 Club Puebla season is the club's 1st season in the top-flight of Mexican football. The team competed in the Liga MX, Copa México, achieving 6th place within their group in the Liga MX and being eliminated in the group stage in the Copa México.

== Season summary ==
With the club's success in the 1970 Mexican Segunda División season, the club found itself in its very first season in the top-flight of Mexican football. Under manager Francisco González Gatíca, the club would have 11 wins, 10 draws and 13 losses.

== Squad ==
No.	Pos.	Nation	Player
—	GK	MEX	Ignacio Sánchez C.
—	GK	MEX	Bruno Valencia
—	DF	MEX	Martín Ibarreche
—	DF	MEX	Héctor Vivar
—	DF	MEX	Alejandro López
—	DF	MEX	Jorge Negrete Vea
—	DF	ARG	Roberto Gutiérrez
—	DF	MEX	Alfonso Sabater
—	DF	MEX	Jorge Arévalo
—	DF	MEX	Luis E. Fernández
—	DF	MEX	Flaco Rebollo
—	DF	MEX	Mascota Sánchez
—	DF	MEX	José Luis Arreola

No.	Pos.	Nation	Player
—	MF	MEX	Fernando Zamora
—	MF	ESP	Benito Pardo
—	MF	MEX	Leonel Urbina
—	MF	MEX	Raúl Guzmán
—	MF	ARG	Luis Ramón Pérez
—	MF	MEX	Gervasio Quiroz
—	FW	MEX	Coco Gómez
—	FW	MEX	Manuel Lapuente
—	FW	MEX	Rafael Borja
—	FW	MEX	Alfonso Báez
—	FW	MEX	Botas Pérez
—	FW	MEX	Rafael Padilla

== Match Results ==
=== Liga MX ===
29 November 1970 1	América	2–0	Puebla	Azteca, Mexico City
	Reinoso 13'; Rodríguez 63'	Report

6 December 1970 2	Puebla	1–1	Pumas UNAM	Cuauhtémoc, Puebla
	Alvarado 21'	Report	Sabater 44'

13 December 1970 3	Torreón	2–0	Puebla	Moctezuma, Torreón
	Villalón 10'; Aguilar 88'	Report

20 December 1970 4	Puebla	2–0	Cruz Azul	Cuauhtémoc, Puebla
	Guzmán 37'; Pardo 43'	Report

27 December 1970 5	Puebla	3–1	Pachuca	Cuauhtémoc, Puebla
	Sabater 13'; Báez 42'; Pardo 50'	Report	Blanco 82'

2 January 1971 6	Jalisco	1–1	Puebla	Jalisco, Guadalajara
	Ubiracy 20'	Report	Guzmán 52'

9 January 1971 7	Puebla	2–0	Monterrey	Cuauhtémoc, Puebla
	(??); (??)	Report

15 January 1971 8	Zacatepec	2–1	Puebla	Estadio Agustín Coruco Díaz, Zacatepec
	Fragoso 46'; Pardo 77' (o.g.)	Report	Báez 47'

24 January 1971 9	Puebla	0–0	Atlante	Cuauhtémoc, Puebla
		Report

31 January 1971 10	Irapuato	3–3	Puebla	Sergio León Chávez, Irapuato
	Hélio 2', 63'; Belmonte (???)	Report	Pardo 15', 70'; Sabater 42' (pen.)	Referee: Briscio

7 February 1971 11	Puebla	2–1	Necaxa	Cuauhtémoc, Puebla
	Báez 30'; Sabater 49'	Report	Perrichon 20'

14 February 1971 12	Laguna	3–1	Puebla	San Isidro, Torreón
	González 5'; Barbosa 7'; Javán (?)	Report	Pardo 23'

21 February 1971 13	Puebla	0–1	León	Cuauhtémoc, Puebla
		Report	Ayala 10'

24 February 1971 14	Guadalajara	0–0	Puebla	Jalisco, Guadalajara
		Report

7 March 1971 15	Puebla	1–1	Veracruz	Cuauhtémoc, Puebla
	Pérez 77'	Report	Willington 13'

14 March 1971 16	Toluca	1–1	Puebla	Nemesio Díez, Toluca
	Guzmán 60'	Report	Romero Reyes 55'

21 March 1971 17	Puebla	2–0	Atlas	Cuauhtémoc, Puebla
	Pérez 35'; Gómez 70'	Report

28 March 1971 18	Puebla	0–2	América	Cuauhtémoc, Puebla
		Report	Rodríguez 24'; E. Borja 33'	Referee: Arturo Yamasaki

4 April 1971 19	Pumas UNAM	3–0	Puebla	Olímpico Universitario, Mexico City
	Padilla 40'; Armenta 60'; Alvarado 87'	Report

11 April 1971 18	Puebla	1–2	Torreón	Cuauhtémoc, Puebla
	Pardo 40'	Report	Arévalo 20'; Villalón 43'

18 April 1971 21	Cruz Azul	4–1	Puebla	Ciudad de los Deportes, Mexico City
	Muciño (?); Pulido (?)	Report	Sabater (?)

25 April 1971 22	Puebla	1–1	Pachuca	Cuauhtémoc, Puebla
	Báez (?)	Report	Zárate 12'

1 May 1971 23	Puebla	2–0	Jalisco	Cuauhtémoc, Puebla
	Pardo 38'; Gómez 63'	Report

8 May 1971 24	Monterrey	2–0	Puebla	Tecnológico, Monterrey
		Report		Attendance: 15,000

16 May 1971 25	Puebla	1–1	Zacatepec	Cuauhtémoc, Puebla
	Gómez 57'	Report	Muñoz 51'

20 May 1971 26	Atlante	1–2	Puebla	Azteca, Mexico City
	Hernández 33'	Report	Pardo 43'; Negrete 44'

30 May 1971 27	Puebla	3–2	Irapuato	Cuauhtémoc, Puebla
	??? (?); ??? (?); ??? (?)	Report	Cruz (?); Sánchez Moya (?)

3 June 1971 28	Necaxa	1–3	Puebla	Victoria, Aguascalientes
	? 5'	Report	R. Borja (?); Pardo (?)

30 May 1971 29	Puebla	1–1	Laguna	Cuauhtémoc, Puebla
	Gómez 12'	Report	Javán 20'

20 June 1971 30	León	4–1	Puebla	León, León de Los Aldama
	Estrada 19'; Albrecht 71' (pen.); Davino 79', 89'	Report	R. Borja 64'	Referee: Enrique Mendoza

24 June 1971 31	Puebla	0–1	Guadalajara	Cuauhtémoc, Puebla
		Report	? (?)

30 June 1971 32	Veracruz	3–0	Puebla	Luis "Pirata" Fuente, Veracruz
		Report

11 July 1971 33	Puebla	3–0	Toluca	Cuauhtémoc, Puebla
	R. Borja 18', 86'; Roberto Gutiérrez 68'	Report

17 July 1971 34	Atlas	2–4	Puebla	Jalisco, Guadalajara
	Quirarte 15'; Chavarín 35'	Report	Lapuente 15'; Pardo 60'; R. Borja 71'; Gutiérrez 73'

=== Copa México ===
==== Round of 16 ====
12 September 1971 First leg	Puebla	0–0	Zacatepec	Cuauhtémoc, Puebla
		Report

19 September 1971 Second leg	Zacatepec	0–0 (4–2 p)	Puebla	Estadio Agustín Coruco Díaz, Zacatepec
		Report
