= Eduardo Chavarría =

Costa Rican footballer (1943–2018)

Personal information
- Full name: Eduardo Chavarría Acuña
- Date of birth: 21 March 1943
- Place of birth: San José, San José Province, Costa Rica
- Date of death: 20 July 2018 (aged 75)
- Place of death: San José, San José Province, Costa Rica
- Position: Centre forward

Senior career*
Years	Team	Apps	(Gls)
1963	Saprissa		
1964	Uruguay de Coronado		
1965–1969	Saprissa		
1969–1970	Torreón		
1970–1972	Saprissa		
1973	ADLER		
1974–1975	Herediano		

International career
1962–1968	Costa Rica	8	(6)
- * Club domestic league appearances and goals

Eduardo Chavarría Acuña (21 March 1943 – 20 June 2018) was a Costa Rican footballer. Nicknamed "Flaco", he played as a central forward for Saprissa within the Primera División de Costa Rica and for Torreón within the Liga MX throughout the 1960s and the 1970s. He also represented Costa Rica for the 1970 FIFA World Cup qualifiers.

== Club career ==
Chavarría began his career within Saprissa for the 1963 Primera División de Costa Rica with his debut match being on 2 June 1963 in a 1–0 defeat against Uruguay de Coronado. Despite not winning the Primera Division that season, he was part of the winning squad for the 1963 Copa Presidente. That same season later saw him score his first two goals in the 3–2 victory over Cartaginés on 9 June 1963. The following 1964 Primera División de Costa Rica saw Saprissa win the tournament though Chavarría was instead playing for Uruguay de Coronado throughout the season. Despite the lack of success in either the league or the cup, he was part of the winning squad for the 1964 Torneo Centroamericano. Upon his return to Saprissa, he saw immediate success as he won the 1965 Primera División de Costa Rica with that season also seeing him be the top scorer with 17 registered goals. This success was later replicated throughout the remainder of the 1960s with Saprissa winning the 1967, 1968 and 1969 Primera División de Costa Rica.

However, his career with Saprissa would be briefly interrupted as Chavarría caught the attention of Torreón manager Juan Abusaid Ríos following a 1969 friendly against América as he wanted to sign foreign players to help Torreón avoid relegation. Despite only achieving 5 wins throughout the 1969–70 season, they had enough points to survive relegation as Laguna was instead relegated before the Liga MX expanded to 18 teams in the following 1970 season. Chavarría continued to play in the season as he scored 12 goals throughout the tournament, forming the attacking formation of the club alongside Raúl Ramos, Elías "La Chuleta" Aguilar and José "La Caica" Zamora, Guillermo Correa Bravo, Julio Villanueva and Hugo Lobatón. Despite his immense success within the Liga MX and Torreón receiving offers from América, Toluca and Monterrey for Chavarría to play for their clubs, the death of his newborn daughter around 1971 caused Chavarría to return to Costa Rica. He would be the last Costa Rican player to play in Mexico until Hernán Medford was signed for Pachuca throughout the latter half of the 1990s.

Upon his return to Costa Rica, his next title would be through the club's double victory at both the 1972 Primera División de Costa Rica and the 1972 Copa Juan Santamaría. That same season saw Chavarría score one of the memorable goals in his career as during the 1972 Copa Fraternidad against Guatemalan club Comunicaciones, following Peter Sandoval's goal at the 22nd minute, Chavarría retaliated with an equalizer in just 30 seconds, marking it the first home goal scored at the new Estadio Ricardo Saprissa Aymá. He later played abroad once more in El Salvador for ADLER for the 1973 Salvadoran Primera División. He later spent the remainder of his career within the Segunda División for Herediano until his retirement in 1975.

== International career ==
Chavarría was first called up to represent Costa Rica for the 1962 CONCACAF Youth Tournament. Throughout the 1960s, he made 8 appearances and scored 6 goals with his final appearance occurring Costa Rica's failure to qualify for the 1970 FIFA World Cup.

== Personal life ==
Chavarría died on 20 July 2018.
