= Jorge Arévalo =

Mexican footballer (born 1941)

Personal information
- Full name: Jorge Arévalo Morales
- Date of birth: 10 March 1941 (age 85)
- Place of birth: Mexico City, Mexico
- Position: Defender

Youth career
- Colegio Saleciano
- 1961–1962: Toluca

Senior career*
Years	Team	Apps	(Gls)
1962–1965	Tampico Madero		
1963–1965	→ Veracruz (loan)		
1965–1970	Toluca		
1969–1970	→ Cruz Azul (loan)		
1970–1971	Puebla		
1971–1973	Laguna		

International career
1968–1970	Mexico	3	(0)
- * Club domestic league appearances and goals

Jorge Arévalo Morales (born 10 March 1941) is a Mexican retired footballer. Nicknamed "Cuervo", "Burro" and "Negro", he played as a defender for various clubs throughout the 1960s and the early 1970s, notably playing for Toluca and Cruz Azul. He also represented Mexico internationally for the 1968 Summer Olympics.

== Club career ==
Arévalo had been enrolled at the Colegio Saleciano where he was classmates with other footballers such as Salvador Farfán, Loco Martínez and Armando Garrido. However, he initially didn't immediately begin a professional football career as he worked in a factory that produced bottles owned by Cervecería Modelo though had a minor career within the company's football club. His talens led to its coach, Don Esteban to convince Toluca to remain within their reserves. However, his professional debut would occur with Tampico Madero alongside Nicolás Palma for the 1962–63 Mexican Primera División where he developed a reputation for his quick anticipation of his opponents moves as well as his great speed. Despsite a modest season, he was then loaned out to Veracruz within the Segunda División and achieved promotion during the 1964–65 Mexican Primera División. He then returned to Toluca where he played an instrumental role during their back-to-back at the 1966–67 and the 1967–68 Mexican Primera División, playing alongside players such as Manuel Cerda Canela, Felipe Ruvalcaba, Vicente Pereda and Claudio Lostaunau. He was then loaned once more to Cruz Azul where he was a part of the winning squad for the club's second title at the 1970 Mexican Primera División where he played alongside players such as Antonio Munguía, Juan Manuel Alejándrez, Fernando Bustos and Octavio Muciño. He then played for the recently Puebla for their 1970–71 season. He later spent the remainder of his career with San Isidro Laguna where he formed the main defensive formation alongside Antonio Navarro Camarena, Pedro Salinas, Güero Laso, Francisco Ramírez and Carlos Ortiz. Despite an offer from Atlante to join their team for their 1973–74 season, Arévalo declined the offer as he moved to Santa Monica, California to work as a welder.

== International career ==
Arévalo made his international debut for Mexico in a 2–1 victory over Mexico on 10 July 1968. That same year saw him named in the roster for the 1968 Summer Olympics. Later, he was included in the preliminary roster for the upcoming 1970 FIFA World Cup in two friendlies to prepare for the tournament with his debut match against Peru on 5 March, seeing him come in as a substitute for Gamaliel Ramírez in the second half with the match later ending in a 0–1 victory. His last appearance was in another friendly in Peru saw the Tricolor losing 1–0 as Arévalo was ultimately not chosen for the final roster of the tournament.
