= 1964 CONCACAF Youth Tournament =

Tournament details
- Host country: Guatemala
- Dates: 2–16 April 1964
- Teams: 9 (from 1 confederation)
- Venue: 2 (in 2 host cities)

Final positions
- Champions: El Salvador (1st title)
- Runners-up: Honduras
- Third place: Guatemala
- Fourth place: Netherlands Antilles

Tournament statistics
- Matches played: 22
- Goals scored: 54 (2.45 per match)
- Top scorer: (El Salvador) Guillermo Ruiz (5 goals)

The 1964 CONCACAF Youth Tournament was held in Guatemala. It was the second edition of the CONCACAF Youth Tournament, now known as the CONCACAF Under-20 Championship.

== Teams ==
The following teams entered the tournament:

Team	Qualification	Appearances	Previous best performances
North American zone
Mexico	Automatic	2nd	Champions (1962)
United States	Automatic	1st	–
Central American zone
El Salvador	Automatic	2nd	First round (1962)
Guatemala	Host	2nd	Runners-up (1962)
Honduras	Automatic	2nd	First round (1962)
Nicaragua	Automatic	2nd	First round (1962)
Panama	Automatic	2nd	First round (1962)
Caribbean zone
Jamaica	Automatic	1st	–
Netherlands Antilles	Automatic	2nd	Third place (1962)

== First round ==
=== Group 1 ===
Pos	Team	Pld	W	D	L	GF	GA	GD	Pts	Qualification
1	Guatemala (H)	4	4	0	0	10	1	+9	8	Advances to final round
2	El Salvador	4	2	1	1	8	6	+2	5	Advances to final round
3	Jamaica	4	1	1	2	4	5	−1	3	
4	United States	4	0	2	2	4	8	−4	2	
5	Nicaragua	4	0	2	2	1	7	−6	2	

Source: RSSSF
(H) Hosts
2 April 1964

United States	1–1	Jamaica
McBrady 3'		Mclean 65'

Estadio Olímpico Mateo Flores, Guatemala City
2 April 1964

Guatemala	3–0	El Salvador
Ruano 30', 47', 52'

Estadio Olímpico Mateo Flores, Guatemala City

4 April 1964

Guatemala	1–0	Jamaica
Díaz 20'

Estadio Olímpico Mateo Flores, Guatemala City
4 April 1964

United States	0–0	Nicaragua

Estadio Olímpico Mateo Flores, Guatemala City

6 April 1964

El Salvador	1–1	Nicaragua
Rodríguez ?'		Quintanilla ?'

Estadio Olímpico Mateo Flores, Guatemala City
6 April 1964

Guatemala	3–1	United States
? ?'; ? ?'; ? ?'		? ?'

Estadio Olímpico Mateo Flores, Guatemala City

8 April 1964

El Salvador	3–0	Jamaica
Ruiz 8'; Morales 20'; Cornejo 75'

Estadio Olímpico Mateo Flores, Guatemala City
8 April 1964

Guatemala	3–0	Nicaragua
Vides 12'; Pineda 52'; García 72'

Estadio Olímpico Mateo Flores, Guatemala City

10 April 1964

Jamaica	3–0	Nicaragua
Ziade ?'; Smith ?'; Brooks ?'

Estadio Olímpico Mateo Flores, Guatemala City
10 April 1964

El Salvador	4–2	United States
Ruiz 8'; Melchior 33' (o.g.); Escobar 38', 47'		McBrady 57', 67'

Estadio Olímpico Mateo Flores, Guatemala City

=== Group 2 ===
Pos	Team	Pld	W	D	L	GF	GA	GD	Pts	Qualification
1	Netherlands Antilles	3	2	1	0	4	2	+2	5	Advances to final round
2	Honduras	3	1	1	1	5	3	+2	3	Advances to final round
3	Mexico	3	1	1	1	3	2	+1	3	
4	Panama	3	0	1	2	3	8	−5	1	

Source: RSSSF
4 April 1964

Honduras	4–1	Panama
? ?'; ? ?'; ? ?'; ? ?'		? ?'

Estadio Carlos Salazar Hijo, Mazatenango
5 April 1964

Mexico	0–1	Netherlands Antilles
		Jacobs 5'

Estadio Carlos Salazar Hijo, Mazatenango

7 April 1964

Honduras	0-1	Netherlands Antilles
		Elizabeth 6'

Estadio Carlos Salazar Hijo, Mazatenango
7 April 1964

Mexico	2–0	Panama
Meza 32' (pen.); Calderón 66' (pen.)

Estadio Carlos Salazar Hijo, Mazatenango

9 April 1964

Panama	2–2	Netherlands Antilles
Ruiz 22'; Rodríguez 59'		Maduro 25'; Jacobs 67'

Estadio Carlos Salazar Hijo, Mazatenango
9 April 1964

Mexico	1–1	Honduras
Calderón 80+4'		Chávez 71'

Estadio Carlos Salazar Hijo, Mazatenango

== Final round ==
Pos	Team	Pld	W	D	L	GF	GA	GD	Pts
1	El Salvador (C)	3	3	0	0	4	0	+4	6
2	Honduras	3	1	0	2	4	4	0	2
3	Guatemala (H)	3	1	0	2	1	2	−1	2
4	Netherlands Antilles	3	1	0	2	3	6	−3	2

Source: RSSSF
(C) Champions; (H) Hosts
12 April 1964

El Salvador	2–0	Netherlands Antilles
Ruiz 19'; Cornejo 50'

Estadio Olímpico Mateo Flores, Guatemala City
12 April 1964

Guatemala	1–0	Honduras
Ruano 39'

Estadio Olímpico Mateo Flores, Guatemala City

14 April 1964

Netherlands Antilles	2–4	Honduras
Elizabeth 19', 35'		Cabuz 27'; Mario Caballero 50'; Mauro Caballero 58'; Fonseca 69'

Estadio Olímpico Mateo Flores, Guatemala City
14 April 1964

Guatemala	0–1	El Salvador
		Ruiz 3'

Estadio Olímpico Mateo Flores, Guatemala City

16 April 1964

Guatemala	0–1	Netherlands Antilles
		Elizabeth ?'

Estadio Olímpico Mateo Flores, Guatemala City
16 April 1964

El Salvador	1–0	Honduras
Ruiz 30'

Estadio Olímpico Mateo Flores, Guatemala City

1964 CONCACAF Youth Championship

El Salvador
1st title

== Goalscorers ==
There were 54 goals scored in 22 matches, for an average of 2.45 goals per match.

5 goals

- (El Salvador) Guillermo Ruiz

4 goals

- (Guatemala) Carlos Ruano
- (Honduras) Unknown scorers
- (Netherlands Antilles) Ronald Elizabeth

3 goals

- (Guatemala) Unknown scorers
- (United States) Gary McBrady

2 goals

- (El Salvador) Daniel Cornejo
- (El Salvador) Iván Escobar
- (Mexico) Miguel Calderón

1 goal

- (El Salvador) Armando Morales
- (El Salvador) Wilfredo Rodríguez
- (Guatemala) Edgar Díaz
- (Guatemala) José García
- (Guatemala) René Pineda
- (Guatemala) Julio Vides
- (Honduras) Mario Caballero
- (Honduras) Mauro Caballero
- (Honduras) Ernesto Cabuz
- (Honduras) Héctor Chávez
- (Honduras) Julio Fonseca
- (Jamaica) Alford Brooks
- (Jamaica) Lloyd Mclean
- (Jamaica) Lloyd Smith
- (Jamaica) Dennis Ziade
- (Mexico) Jesús Meza
- (Netherlands Antilles) Bernardo Jacobs
- (Netherlands Antilles) Richard Jacobs
- (Netherlands Antilles) Flavius Maduro
- (Nicaragua) Douglas Quintanilla
- (Panama) Rogelio Rodríguez
- (Panama) Enrique Ruiz
- (Panama) Unknown scorer
- (United States) Unknown scorer

1 own goal

- (United States) Brad Melchior (against El Salvador)
