= Guillermo Correa Bravo =

Peruvian footballer (1942–2008)

- Correa in the 1960s

Personal information
- Full name: Guillermo Correa Bravo
- Date of birth: 2 August 1942
- Place of birth: Lima, Lima Province, Peru
- Date of death: 14 May 2008 (aged 65)
- Place of death: Mexico City, Mexico
- Position: Central defender

Senior career*
Years	Team	Apps	(Gls)
1959	Santiago Barranco		
1960–1962	Atlético Chalaco		
1963	Centro Iqueño		
1964–1968	Sport Boys		
1969–1971	Torreón		
1971–1972	Irapuato		
1972–1974	Ciudad Madero		
1974–1975	Luis Ángel Firpo		
- * Club domestic league appearances and goals

Guillermo Correa Bravo (2 August 1942 – 14 May 2008) was a Peruvian footballer. Nicknamed "Popi", he played as a central defender for Sport Boys within the Liga 1 within Peru and Torreón and Ciudad Madero within the Liga MX in Mexico.

== Club career ==
Correa began his career within Santiago Barranco in 1959 before switching over to Atlético Chalaco for the next three seasons. After a brief stint with Centro Iqueño, he spent the majority the 1960s with Sport Boys where he was part of the runners-up squad of the 1966 Torneo Descentralizado. However, his career would switch up as Torreón manager Grimaldo González and his assistant Federico Sagiante had travelled to Peru to look for a central defender, a midfielder and a forward for the 1969–70 Mexican Primera División as the club had been recently promoted. By the time they scouted Correa, they had already signed Sporting Cristal players Julio Villanueva and Hugo Lobatón and chose to have Correa complete the trio due to his physical size and tactical discipline. By March 1969, the trio arrived at the Estadio San Isidro and the three played throughout the majority of the 1969–70 season. His first success in Mexico came during the 1969–70 Copa México where the Diablos Blancos achieved runners-up in the tournament. Even following his contract with Torreón expiring following the 1970–71 season, he continued to play in Mexico with Irapuato with Lobatón throughout the 1971–72 Mexican Primera División. Following Irapuato's relegation, he spent the next two seasons with Ciudad Madero where his greatest success came during the 1972–73 Mexican Segunda División as he helped the club achieve promotion for the 1973–74 Mexican Primera División. He spent his final season with Luis Ángel Firpo in El Salvador before his retirement.

== Personal life ==
Following his retirement, Correa returned to Mexico where he lived until his death on 14 May 2008.
