= Mauro Caballero =

Mauro Caballero may refer to:

- Mauro Caballero (footballer, born 1972), Paraguayan football striker
- Mauro Caballero (footballer, born 1994), Paraguayan football striker
- Mauro Caballero (Honduran footballer), Honduran football attacking midfielder
