= Gilberto Rodríguez (footballer) =

Mexican footballer (born 1946)

Personal information
- Full name: Gilberto Rodríguez Rivera
- Date of birth: 8 May 1943 (age 83)
- Place of birth: Guadalajara, Jalisco, Mexico
- Position: Goalkeeper

Youth career
- 1960–1964: Guadalajara

Senior career*
Years	Team	Apps	(Gls)
1964–1979	Guadalajara		(1)
Total			(1)

International career
1967–1968	Mexico	5	(0)
Medal record
Men's football
Representing Mexico
CONCACAF Championship
Silver medal – second place	1967 Honduras	Team
- * Club domestic league appearances and goals

Gilberto Rodríguez Rivera (born 8 May 1943) is a retired Mexican footballer. Nicknamed "Coco", he spent his entire career with Guadalajara as their goalkeeper throughout the 1960s and the 1970s. He also represented Mexico internationally for the 1967 CONCACAF Championship.

== Club career ==
=== Youth career ===
Growing up with poor but supportive parents, Rodríguez played as a goalkeeper within Anacleto González Flores, even an early age. Club president Mario Arrona then decided to bring him to Guadalajara where he would begin playing within their youth sector. Despite not making any appearances, he was still part of the winning squad for the youth championship. This success caused him to be enrolled into the "B" reserves before being promoted to the "A' reserves in 1962.

=== Senior career ===
Under club manager Javier de la Torre, Rodríguez debuted during the 1964–65 season. At just 21 years of age, he consistently competed with Ignacio Calderón for a position in the Starting XI for the club. His debut season was extremely successful for Chivas as they won both the 1964–65 Mexican Primera División as well as the 1964–65 Campeón de Campeones back-to-back. This success was followed by their success in the 1969–70 Mexican Primera División, the 1969–70 Copa México and the 1969–70 Campeón de Campeones. During the 1971–72 Copa México, Rodríguez interestingly both saved two attempted goals as well as scoring the winning goal against Cruz Azul. Throughout his career, Rodríguez was characterized by his bravery and competitive spirit, Calderón was characterized by being a player with more class which resulted in the two splitting the position of goalkeeper throughout the 1970s until his retirement in 1979.

== International career ==
Rodríguez was called up to represent Mexico for the 1967 CONCACAF Championship where he only made a single appearance in the 4–0 beating against Trinidad and Tobago on 12 March 1967. He found far more prominence in 1968 as he partook in a series of friendlies against various other national teams.

== Personal life ==
Cruz Azul goalkeeper and Mexican international José de Jesús Corona is Rodríguez's cousin.

== See also ==
- List of goalscoring goalkeepers
