= Green conservatism =

Combination of conservatism and environmentalism

Green conservatism is a combination of conservatism with environmentalism. Environmental concern has been voiced by both conservative politicians and philosophers throughout the history of conservatism. A feature of green conservatism is a stress on market-based policies to address environmental concerns, rather than mere centralised planning. Individual and local empowerment is preferred over top down control. Where solutions to problems are global, such as climate change, green conservatives believe the government's role "is to empower individuals, entrepreneurs, and philanthropists to collaborate and come up with innovations that will solve climate change". Green conservatives often embrace the principles of bright green environmentalism.

== Variants ==
=== Americas ===
==== Brazil ====
The National Ecologic Party had ties to the Assemblies of God, the largest evangelical denomination present in Brazil, and upheld green conservatism but it has now changed its name to Patriota and renounced its green and pro-ecologist policies in favor of its conservative and nationalist policies; it has maintained and strengthened its religious opposition to abortion, same-sex marriage and other left-wing policies.

==== Canada ====
In Canada, the term "green conservatism" was popularized in 2006 by Preston Manning, former federal opposition leader and founder of the Reform Party of Canada. Specifically, Manning started developing the idea as a way to find common ground between younger and older voters. He has specifically talked about using water pricing in the Oil Sands to make oil producers more efficient. In 1988, then-graduate student Stephen Harper, writing in the Blue Book, which influenced the Reform Party principles, argued for an environmental policy that supports and protects the environment but reduces bureaucratic control. Harper argued that the Reform Party was aware of environmental exploitation found within "socialist, capitalist, and social democratic patterns." Canadian idealist and philosopher George Parkin Grant, writing in the Red Tory Manifesto, argued that Tories support environmental incentives as a way to oppose "captains of industry who were destroying the environment for a crude and short-sighted notion of profit".

In 2006, Progressive Conservative Prime Minister Brian Mulroney, was honoured as "the greenest prime minister in Canadian history". He brought in the Canada-U.S. acid rain treaty, added eight new national parks and brought in the Environmental Protection Act. Then-PM Stephen Harper argued that "He [Mulroney] didn't produce grandiose schemes and unworkable arrangements and the kind of problems we got into with Kyoto."

The Coalition Avenir Québec's party leader François Legault advocates a 'pragmatic' approach on the issues that would balance between the "milltant" approach of the environment movement but "create wealth, to reduce the wealth gap" between Quebec and other Canadian provinces. In 2019, Benoit Charette, the Quebec Environmental minister, denounced remarks made by people stating that they would no longer have children to protect the environment as "too alarmist". However, Charette pointed to "the management of residual materials and the issue of plastic and glass water bottles directly" as a way to tackle environmental issues realistically.

==== Mexico ====
The Ecologist Green Party of Mexico (PVE), founded in 1993, won 47 seats in the 2015 Mexican legislative election.

In 2008, the PVEM initiated an advertising campaign in favor of reintroducing the death penalty in Mexico. This led to the European Green Party's withdrawal of recognition of the PVEM as a legitimate green party.

During an interview, PVE candidate Gamaliel Ramírez verbally attacked an openly gay candidate for Guadalajara mayor and called for criminal laws against homosexuality to be established. In the following days, Ramírez issued a written apology after the party expressed disappointment at his remarks.

==== United States ====
One of the first uses of the term green conservatism was by former United States Republican House Speaker Newt Gingrich, in a debate on environmental issues with John Kerry, according to Human Events. Around this time, the green conservative movement was sometimes referred to as the crunchy con movement, a term popularized by National Review magazine and the writings of Rod Dreher.

In the United States, the Republican Party was generally considered as the conservative party. Green conservatism manifested itself as a movement in groups such as ConservAmerica and the American Conservation Coalition, which seek to strengthen the Republican Party's stance on environmental issues and support efforts to conserve natural resources and protect human and environmental health.

The Independent Greens of Virginia (or Indy Greens) call themselves "common sense conservatives". The party, over the last decade, has run many conservative greens for local, state, and federal office. In 2004, the party gave its ballot line to Constitution Party nominee Michael Peroutka for president, and in 2008, once again placed the Constitution Party nominee Chuck Baldwin on the ballot as its presidential candidate. The Indy Greens call for balancing the federal budget and paying off the federal debt.

The Republican Party had long supported the protection of the environment in the first half of 20th Century. Republican President Theodore Roosevelt was a prominent conservationist whose policies eventually led to the creation of the modern National Park Service. Republican President Richard Nixon was responsible for establishing the Environmental Protection Agency in 1970.

In 2007, California Republican Governor Arnold Schwarzenegger, with the support of 16 other states, sued the federal government and the United States Environmental Protection Agency for the right to set vehicle emission standards higher than the federal standard, saying that the Clean Air Act entitles states to do so.

In 2000, the Republican Party adopted as part of its platform support for the development of market-based solutions to environmental problems. According to the platform, "economic prosperity and environmental protection must advance together, environmental regulations should be based on science, the government's role should be to provide market-based incentives to develop the technologies to meet environmental standards, we should ensure that environmental policy meets the needs of localities, and environmental policy should focus on achieving results processes."

The George W. Bush administration, along with several of the candidates that sought the Republican presidential nomination in 2008, supported increased Federal investment into the development of clean alternative fuels, increased nuclear power, as well as fuels such as ethanol, as a way of helping the U.S. achieve energy independence, as opposed to supporting less use of carbon dioxide-producing methods of generating energy. John McCain, who ran unsuccessfully for president in 2008, supported the cap-and-trade policy, a policy that is quite popular among Democrats but much less so among other Republicans.

=== Asia ===
==== Japan ====
In Japan, the Environmental Green Political Assembly, or Midori no Kaigi, emerged from the conservative reformist Sakigake Party. It combined a conservative ideology with an ecologist platform, forcing out a number of non-ecologist members to join the Democratic Party's Ryoun-kai faction. It showed poor performance at the polls, and was dissolved in 2004, merged into the conservative Liberal Democratic Party.

=== Europe ===
==== Austria ====
The Austrian environmental movement (USB) was founded in 1973, out of this, the Electoral community for citizens' initiatives and environmental protection (WBU) has emerged. The WBU was thereby a grouping with bourgeois, liberal and conservative sides, which also did not shy away from the right-wing extremist spectrum.

The United Greens of Austria (VGÖ) was founded in 1982, this represented the bourgeois wing of the movement. By former members VGÖ later the Civil Green Austria (BGÖ) was founded.

The Free Party Salzburg (FPS) claims to be the only party that advocates that no genetically modified seed funds may be spread and has advocated against genetic engineering. It calls for a ban on glyphosate and it "deals with the green issues in Salzburg".

The second Kurz government of the Republic of Austria that was in office from 7 January 2020, to 11 October 2021, introduced a governing program that combines typically green political concepts such as environmental protection but also typically conservative positions on topics such as integration, migration and economic policy.

==== Denmark ====
In Denmark, the Conservative People's Party advocates conservative policies, while being a part of the blue bloc of Folketinget. They opposed the Danish 2016 Agriculture Reform due to environmental concerns.

==== France ====
Génération Écologie is an ecologically focused political party in France. It has been nicknamed 'The Blues' due to its association with a number of conservative political groups.

Antoine Waechter, a former presidential candidate of Les Verts, founded Mouvement Ecologiste Indépendant after Les Verts adopted left-wing positions. Mouvement Ecologiste Indépendant adheres to centrist politics and so it may include some members who lean towards green conservatism.

==== Germany ====
The former governing Greens in the state of Baden-Württemberg under Minister-President Winfried Kretschmann had been described as more conservative than their federal counterparts. Indeed, Kretschmann identifies as a green conservative and has been associated with economically liberal viewpoints.

The Green Action Future (GAZ), the predecessor party of the ÖDP, was perceived and criticized in opinion leaders such as Der Spiegel as clearly conservative.

In Germany, the Ecological Democratic Party (ÖDP) was formed by more right-wing defectors from Die Grünen in 1982. It combined a focus on environmental protection with a promotion of the right to life (opposition to abortion, euthanasia and capital punishment); it differs from The Greens by being less supportive of immigration and restrictions on state powers in criminal justice issues, not focusing on gay and lesbian rights, and having a differing view on feminism. While having never gained seats in federal or state legislatures in Germany, it made a name for itself by its involvement in the opposition to a Czech nuclear reactor in Temelin, across the border from Bavaria. It led an initiative for a popular referendum to abolish the Bavarian Senate (that state's upper house) which was successful. The party won a seat in the 2014 EU Parliament election and remains active.

==== Greece ====
Ecologist Greece is a green conservative party.

On 11 September 2009, Georgios Karatzaferis, leader of the far-right nationalist Popular Orthodox Rally (Laos) party announced that Ecologists Greece leader Papanikolas would run on the statewide Laos ticket in the 2009 Greek legislative election.

==== Hungary ====
The Green Party of Hungary was founded on 19 November 1989. But when Zoltán Medveczki became Party President in March 1993, the party gradually changed its political position from moderate to radical right-wing. The MZP adopted anti-liberal, anti-communist, anti-Semitic and pro-fascist elements (Ecofascism) to its program and also criticized privatization and market economy. Medveczki also founded and registered the party's paramilitary wing, the Alliance of National Green Youth. It was dissolved in 2011.

The Hungarian political party Our Homeland Movement has been described as green conservative. In a 2019 interview to Mandiner, party leader László Toroczkai described MHM as "a unique green party in Europe", stating that "we are unwilling to accept that only anti-social and anti-human liberal parties can be green parties. We think that those who do not want to protect our environment, our forests, our beautiful Great Plain, Lake Balaton, our rivers cannot really love their homeland". Thus, the party is sometimes referred to as supporting some form of green conservatism.

==== Italy ====
The Greens Greens was founded by Maurizio Lupi, a former member of Christian Democracy and of the Federation of the Greens. In the 2004 provincial elections of Turin the Greens Greens supported the centre-right candidate Franco Botta. In the 2005 Piedmontese regional election the Greens Greens supported the centre-right candidate Enzo Ghigo; the list got 23,761 votes and the 1.16% of the vote. In the 2008 Italian general election Alessandro Lupi ran for the Chamber in The People of Freedom's list, in the division Piedmont 1, but he was not elected. In the 2010 Piedmontese regional election the Greens Greens supported the centre-right candidate Roberto Cota, winning the 1.76% of the vote and one seat. In the 2014 Piedmontese regional election the party supported the candidate of Forza Italia Gilberto Pichetto Fratin, but it only gained 0.27% of the vote and no seats.

The Five Star Movement, formed in 2009 and which entered government after the 2018 Italian general election, has an inconsistent history regarding environmentalism. The name of the party originates from its five principles: public water access, sustainable transportation, sustainable development, the right to internet access, and environmentalism. The party has been difficult to classify on a traditional left-right political spectrum, as it incorporates positions and features of both sides. From 2009 to 2015, the party was generally seen as somewhat more left-leaning than right-leaning, owing primarily due to its strong performance among young Italians. However, from 2016 onwards, the party saw an influx of disillusioned right-leaning voters, and the party shifted accordingly, particularly on issues such as immigration.

In June 2018, M5S entered into government with Lega Nord, a right-wing populist party. The Five Stars Movement claims to support better management of public water resources, promotes the development of renewable energy resources, opposes the construction of pipelines and disposal of household waste via incinerators, and promotes support for small farms against large agri-business in an effort to preserve Italy's natural landscape and local economies. This can be seen as a form of "green conservatism"; however, the M5S campaign in 2018 rarely featured discussion about the environment, and the party leadership has not signaled that environmentalism will be a priority over the 2018–2023 period that they are in power with Lega Nord. In September 2018, M5S supported a deal to keep a highly-polluting steel mill in Castelbuono open, citing employment concerns that trumped environmentalism. The mill was transferred from Ilva to ArcelorMittal. The deal was a violation of promises made in the 2018 election campaign to close the plant, which spewed dioxin into the local environment.

==== Latvia ====
In February 2004, after the breakdown of the four-party government, Indulis Emsis of the Latvian Green Party was appointed to form a new government and became the first head of government of a country anywhere in the world from a Green party.

Following the 2014 Latvian parliamentary election, the Union of Greens and Farmers became the third largest party in the country with 21 seats, 6 of which are held by the Latvian Green Party which is the second largest of the 4 parties which form the Union (in terms of the number of seats it holds).

Leading politicians of the Latvian Green Party have often supported nationalist and socially conservative views, leading to its expulsion from the European Green Party on 10 November 2019.

==== Lithuania ====
In the 2016 Lithuanian parliamentary election, the Lithuanian Farmers and Greens Union became the largest party in a surprise victory with 51 seats.

Following the success of the Farmers and Greens Union at the 2016 election, chairman Ramūnas Karbauskis proposed a grand coalition in combination with a technocratic government focusing on economic growth, including both the centre-right Homeland Union and the centre-left Social Democratic Party of Lithuania. However, the Homeland Union declined to be part of a coalition in which it would not be needed for the parliamentary majority. Subsequently, the Farmers and Greens Union formed a government with only the Social Democrats.

==== Portugal ====
Gonçalo Ribeiro Telles made a name for himself as a landscape architect and in the 1940s had served in the council for the Lisbon District under the Estado Novo. He would resign from the District and become a staunch critic of the Estado Novo gaining national prominence when he accused the Estado Novos policies as the cause of the 1967 Portugal floods. Telles became an outspoken Utopian, promoting back to nature, "balancing" of the populations in the cities and countrysides, and, while he always described it as a conservative democratic movement, his supporters quickly swelled with monarchists and Catholic Integralists. In 1974 he co-founded the People's Monarchist Party with Francisco Rolão Preto, a former Fascist and leader of the National Syndicalists, who become disillusioned with Fascism due to the rule of António de Oliveira Salazar and became a monarchist instead. Due to Preto's background he resigned shortly after the party's opening congress, with Telles being named the new leader.

During his leadership he leaned the PPM away from solely monarchism, working to brand the party as a big-tent for Monarchism, localism and environmentalism. He was named the "Minister of State and Quality of Life" by the Democratic Alliance after winning the 1979 election using the office to create the National Agricultural Reserve and the National Ecological Reserve. In 1988 Telles left the PPM and in 1993 created the Earth Party (MPT), solely focusing on the green conservative aspect of his PPM leadership. Also, starting in 1975, he founded, taught, and sponsored courses at the University of Évora for Landscape Architecture, making it the only institution to award that degree in the entire country. In 2013 he was awarded the Sir Geoffrey Jellicoe prize, the highest honor in landscaping, and died in 2020 at the age of 98.

Telles left the MPT in 2007 and shortly after in 2008 it was announced that the party would be running as part of the Libertas.eu list for the 2009 European Parliament election in Portugal. The MPT received 24,062 votes, or 0.67% of the votes, which would be their high-watermark. The party has struggled financially supporting candidates for parliamentary elections just to never break the 0.5% mark and fell into insolvency in 2018 and nearly dissolved after the 2019 election. In the 2025 Portuguese legislative election the party received just 478 individual votes.

==== United Kingdom ====
In 1970, the Conservative Government of Edward Heath created the United Kingdom's first Department of the Environment.

At the 1988 Conservative Party Conference Margaret Thatcher said, "It’s we Conservatives who are not merely friends of the Earth – we are its guardians and trustees for generations to come. The core of Tory philosophy and for the case for protecting the environment are the same. No generation has a freehold on this earth. All we have is a life tenancy – with a full repairing lease. This Government intends to meet the terms of that lease in full."

In the early 21st century, the Conservative Party under David Cameron promised a green agenda which included proposals designed to impose a tax on workplace car parking spaces, a halt to airport growth, a tax on low fuel efficiency 4x4s and restrictions on car advertising. The measures were suggested by The Quality of Life Policy Group, which was set up by Cameron to help fight climate change. Bright Blue, a liberal conservative think tank was established in 2014 and launched the Green Conservatism project to create conservative support for policies that address climate change in 2017.

Cameron spoke of embracing 'green' issues, and had made climate change a key component of his speeches. He called for an independent climate change commission to ensure that emissions reductions targets are met. However, Cameron's claim of leading the "greenest government ever" has been rejected by Green Party MP Caroline Lucas, who argued in 2011 that Cameron had "shown little interest in green policy and the sustainability agenda."

Zac Goldsmith, who was the Conservative candidate for London Mayor in 2016, describes himself as an environmentalist. He had received the Global Green Award for International Environmental Leadership in 2004.

Sir Roger Scruton, former professor of philosophy at Oxford and St Andrews, has spoken and written extensively on the need for a Green Conservatism drawing upon a love of place and heritage.

In 2019, Theresa May's Conservative government passed plans to become the first major economy to pass new laws that would reduce emissions to net zero by 2050.

=== Oceania ===
==== Australia ====
The first significant Green conservative in Australia was Prime Minister Malcolm Fraser. During his time in office (1975–1983) he legislated significant environmental-protection laws for the Great Barrier Reef while leader of the centre-right Liberal Party as early as the 1970s.

Australian politics became more polemical around the year 2000. Once an uneasy alliance between the Australian Labor Party (the traditional opposition to the Liberal Party) and The Greens had formed, it caused many conservative voters to become suspicious of green politics and so interest in green conservatism waned.

In 2004 the conservative Family First Party aired a television advertisement labelling The Australian Greens as the Extreme Greens. Since then, the continuously increasing anti-conservative dominance within The Greens has led to this label receiving broader use in the media. Consequently, green conservatives are entering political parties other than The Greens instead.

As a result of the 2019 water crisis in regional New South Wales, the conservative Shooters, Fishers and Farmers Party began espousing some green policies to ensure the availability of fresh water in remote areas. These mostly focused around the controversial Murray Darling Basin plan. However, the party's policy on issues such as greyhound racing conflict with those of many animal rights activists who are often present within green politics.

In the 2022 Australian federal election, the Teal independents movement was seen as a response of typically conservative-leaning inner-city voters to inaction by the governing right-wing Liberal-National Coalition on climate change. This phenomenon saw centre-right Liberal Party MPs lose their seats to Teal independents in Sydney, Melbourne and Perth, and to the Greens in Brisbane.

==== New Zealand ====
The Conservative Party of New Zealand has an environmental policy focused around actions within the country that can help the local environment rather than being tied to international agreements. In 2019, the New Zealand National Party supported a New Zealand Labour Party bill that would aiming for net zero emission by 2050.

== See also ==
- Agrarianism
- Bioconservatism
- Black–green coalition
- Compassionate conservatism
- Eco-capitalism
- Ecofascism
- Environmentalism in The Lord of the Rings
- Fiscal environmentalism
- Free-market environmentalism
- Georgism
- Green liberalism
- Green libertarianism
- John Gray
- Michael Savage
- Progressive conservatism
- Sir Roger Scruton
- Traditionalist conservatism
