= Raúl Gómez =

Raúl Gómez may refer to:

- Raúl Gómez (cyclist) (1945–2010), Argentine racing cyclist
- Raúl Gómez García, Mexican murderer convicted of the 2005 Denver police officer shooting
- Raúl Gómez González (born 1954), Mexican prelate of the Roman Catholic Church
- Raúl Gómez Jattin (1945–1997), Colombian poet
- Raúl Gómez Ramírez (1964–2014), Mexican politician from Guanajuato
- Raúl Gómez Ramírez (footballer) (known as "Willy Gómez", 1950–2025), Mexican footballer
