= Jorge Negrete Vea =

Mexican footballer (born 1946)

Personal information
- Full name: Juan González Martínez
- Date of birth: 23 March 1943
- Place of birth: Heroica Nogales, Sonora, Mexico
- Date of death: 5 January 2019 (aged 75)
- Place of death: Mexicali, Baja California del Norte, Mexico
- Position: Central defender

Senior career*
Years	Team	Apps	(Gls)
1965–1969	América		
1969–1973	Puebla		
1973–1974	Veracruz		

International career
1969	Mexico	1	(-)
- * Club domestic league appearances and goals

Jorge Negrete Vea (23 March 1943 – 5 January 2019) was a Mexican footballer. Nicknamed "Profe", he played for América throughout the late 1960s and for Puebla throughout the early 1970s as a central defender. He also represented Mexico internationally for the 1969 CONCACAF Championship.

== Club career ==
Despite being born in Heroica Nogales in Sonora, he soon moved to Ensenada in the nearby state of Baja California del Norte. Within local teams in his home city, he developed enough talent to be scouted by América to make his debut during the winning 1965–66 season. He saw initial success within the club throughout the mid-1960s, making regular appearances within. However, the dawn of the late 1960s saw players such as Guillermo Hernández, Ernesto Cisneros, Javier Fragoso, Raúl Arellano, Felipe Ruvalcaba and Ignacio Calderón dominate the Mexican Primera División as well as general poor pay from the Cremas made Negrete sign for Puebla for the 1969–70 Mexican Segunda División after being convinced by György Marik as a part of a project to sign players from other Liga MX clubs by club manager Francisco González Gatica. This shift in the roster saw Negrete play alongside other players such as Manuel Lapuente, Benito Pardo, Martín Ibarreche and Coco Gómez. This project would pay off as Puebla would successfully achieve promotion in the following 1970 Mexican Segunda División. Despite taking a small break in 1972 due to repeated injury, he played his final games for the club in the first half of 1973 as he spent his final season with Veracruz before his retirement that year.

== International career ==
Negrete was called up to represent Mexico for the 1969 CONCACAF Championship. He only made a single appearance in the 1–0 loss against Guatemala on 2 December 1969.

== Later life ==
Negrete later married María Elena Valdéz and had three children with her: Raúl Armando, Jorge y Elizabeth along with many cousins. He also served as a coach within Cecyt 201 at his home city where he coached players such as Jorge "Marro" Cárdenas and Javier "Capi" Herrera. He died on 5 January 2019 from chronic anemia.
