= Football at the 1967 Pan American Games =

Football – Men's tournament at the 1967 Pan American Games
- Venue: Winnipeg Stadium
- Dates: 24 July – 3 August

Medalists
Gold medal	Mexico
Silver medal	Bermuda
Bronze medal	Trinidad and Tobago

The fifth edition of the football tournament at the Pan American Games was held in Winnipeg, Manitoba, Canada, from July 24 to August 3, 1967. Eight teams divided in two groups of four did compete in a round-robin competition, with Brazil defending the title. For the first time the tournament ended with a knock-out stage after the preliminary round.

== Participants ==
- Argentina
- Bermuda
- Canada
- Colombia
- Cuba
- Mexico
- Trinidad and Tobago
- United States

== First round ==
=== Group A ===
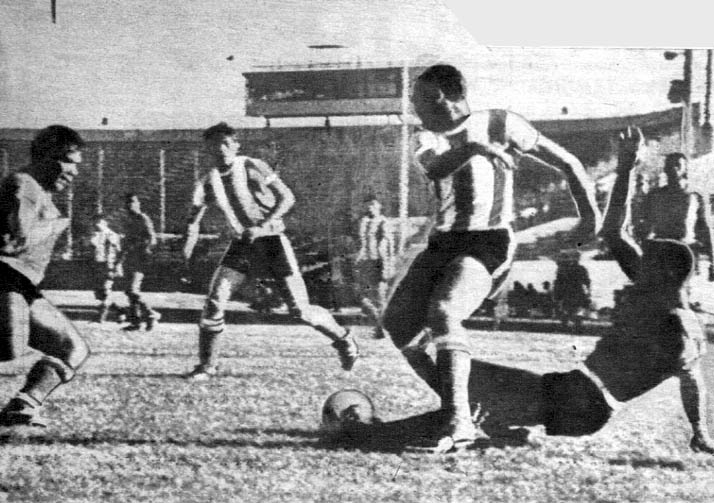
Argentina v Trinidad and Tobago match

Team	Pts	Pld	W	D	L	GF	GA	GD
Trinidad and Tobago	5	3	2	1	0	7	3	+4
Mexico	4	3	1	2	0	6	3	+3
Argentina	3	3	1	1	1	7	3	+4
Colombia	0	3	0	0	3	2	13	−11

24 July 1967

Colombia	2–5	Trinidad and Tobago
Tovar 34', 43'	Report	Browne 60', 85'; Berassa 63'; Small 79', 83'

Winnipeg Stadium, Winnipeg

24 July 1967

Mexico	2–2	Argentina
Pereda 17'; Regueiro 25'	Report	Ponce 82'; Martínez 89'

Winnipeg Stadium, Winnipeg

26 July 1967

Mexico	1–1	Trinidad and Tobago
Lapuente 34'	Report	LaBastide 73' (pen.)

Winnipeg Stadium, Winnipeg

26 July 1967

Colombia	0–5	Argentina
	Report	C. García 7'; A. García 16', 18'; Ponce 44'; Vicente 46'

Winnipeg Stadium, Winnipeg

28 July 1967

Trinidad and Tobago	1–0	Argentina
Berassa 59'	Report

Winnipeg Stadium, Winnipeg

28 July 1967

Mexico	3–0 (Note: Abandoned at 3–0 in 82' after Colombia had three players sent off.)	Colombia
Cerda 66'; Pereda 73', 77'	Report

Winnipeg Stadium, Winnipeg

=== Group B ===
Team	Pts	Pld	W	D	L	GF	GA	GD
Canada	5	3	2	1	0	6	4	+2
Bermuda	4	3	1	2	0	10	6	+4
United States	2	3	1	0	2	6	10	−4
Cuba	1	3	0	1	2	3	5	−2

25 July 1967

Bermuda	7–3	United States
Smith; Dill; Douglas; Romaine; Gansler (o.g.)	Report	Roboostoff; Minors (o.g.)

Alexander Park, Winnipeg
Attendance: 4,000
Referee: Arthur Weir (CAN)

25 July 1967

Canada	2–1	Cuba
McPate 25'; Hansen 77' (pen.)	Report	Fariñas 71'

Winnipeg Stadium, Winnipeg
Attendance: 7,000
Referee: Keith Dunstan (BER)

27 July 1967

Cuba	1–1	Bermuda
Tsiba 40'	Report	Smith 40'

Alexander Park, Winnipeg
Attendance: 5,000
Referee: Dan Kulai (CAN)

27 July 1967

Canada	2–1	United States
Baird 40'; McPate 70'	Report	Benedek 75' (pen.)

Alexander Park, Winnipeg
Attendance: 5,000
Referee: José Minsal (CUB)

29 July 1967

Canada	2–2	Bermuda
McKay; Hansen	Report	Dill

Winnipeg Stadium, Winnipeg
Attendance: 7,000
Referee: Henry Landauer (USA)

30 July 1967

Cuba	1–2	United States
Mico 63'	Report	Kinealy 21'; Tuchscherer 50'

Winnipeg Stadium, Winnipeg
Attendance: 3,000
Referee: Frank Lee (CAN)

== Final round ==
=== Bracket ===
Semi-finals
Winnipeg
Trinidad and Tobago	1
Bermuda	3
Winnipeg
Canada	1
Mexico	2

Final
Winnipeg
Mexico	4
Bermuda	0
Third place
Winnipeg
Trinidad and Tobago	4
Canada	1

=== Semi finals ===
31 July 1967

Trinidad and Tobago	1–3	Bermuda
Gamaldo 77'	Report	Dills 33'; Darrell 67'; Best 87'

Winnipeg Stadium, Winnipeg

1 August 1967

Canada	1–2	Mexico
Baird 5'	Report	Pereda 36'; Dosal 46'

Winnipeg Stadium, Winnipeg

=== Bronze medal match ===
2 August 1967

Canada	1–4	Trinidad and Tobago
Adams 72'	Report	Browne 43'; Berassa 52'; Aleong 80'; Gellineau 85'

Winnipeg Stadium, Winnipeg

=== Gold Medal match ===
3 August 1967

Mexico	4–0 (a.e.t.)	Bermuda
Pereda 91', 99', 106'; Lapuente 110'	Report

Winnipeg Stadium, Winnipeg
Attendance: 3,000
Referee: Raymond Morgan (Canada)

Team details

Mexico
Bermuda

GK	Javier Vargas
DF	Juan M. Alejándrez
DF	Héctor Pulido
DF	Carlos Albert
DF	Mario Pérez
MF	Luis Regueiro
MF	Juan Dosal
MF	Fernando Bustos	(substituted off) 104'
FW	Luis Estrada	(substituted off) 71'
FW	Vicente Pereda
FW	Manuel Cerda
Substitutes:
FW	Manuel Lapuente	(substituted on) 71'
FW	Juan Alvarado	(substituted on) 104'
Manager:
(Mexico) Ignacio Trélles

GK	Dennis Wainwright
DF	Rudolph Minors
DF	Irving Romaine
DF	Rudolph Smith
DF	Gladwin Daniels
MF	Keneth Cann
MF	Lionel Smith
MF	Gary Darrell	(substituted off) a'
FW	Clyde Best
FW	Carlton Dill
FW	Marcus Douglas	(substituted off) b'
Substitutes:
MF	William Cann	(substituted on) a'
DF	Noel Simons	(substituted on) b'
Manager:
(Bermuda) Grahams Adams

1967 Pan American Games winners

Mexico
First title

== Medalists ==
Event	Gold	Silver	Bronze
Men's tournament	Mexico Javier Vargas Rueda; Gilberto Rodríguez Rivera; Juan Manuel Alejándrez; Carlos Albert Llorente; Mario Guadarrama; José Humberto Villaseñor; Javier Bazán; Luis Regueiro; Héctor Pulido; Alberto Onofre; Juan Dosal; Jesús Prado; Vicente Pereda; Luis Estrada Luévano; Manuel Lapuente; Manuel Cerda Canela; Fernando Castañeda; Juan Alvarado (HC – Ignacio Trelles)	Bermuda Dennis Wainright; Earlston Jennings; Rudolph Minors; Irving Romaine; Noel Simons; Rudolph Smith; Gladwin Daniels; Gary Darrell; Kenneth Cann; Lionel Smith; Edward Ming Cann; Gordon Cholmondeley; Lerroy Lewis; Willian Cann; Clyde Best; Winston Trott; Carlton Dill; Marcus Douglas (HC – (England) Graham Adams)	Trinidad and Tobago Lincoln Abraham Phillips; Jean Mouttet; Tyronne Labastide; Aldwin Ferguson; Selwyn Murren; Hugh Mulzac; David Armin; Victor Gamaldo; Joseph Sedley; Bertrand Grell; Andrew Aleong; Alvin Corneal; Gerry Browne; Kelvin Berassa; Patrick Small; Jeff Gellineau; Richard Steward (HC – Conrad Braithwhite)

== Goalscorers ==
There were 63 goals scored in 16 matches, for an average of 3.94 goals per match.

7 goals

- (Mexico) Vicente Pereda

5 goals

- (Bermuda) Carlton Dill

3 goals

- (Trinidad and Tobago) Gerry Browne
- (Trinidad and Tobago) Kevin Berassa

2 goals

- (Argentina) Antonio García
- (Argentina) Ramón Ponce
- (Bermuda) Rudolph Smith
- (Canada) Jim Baird
- (Canada) Harold Hansen
- (Canada) Ralph McPate
- (Colombia) Luís Alfonso Tovar
- (Mexico) Manuel Lapuente
- (Trinidad and Tobago) Patrick Small
- (United States) Alex Roboostoff

1 goal

- (Argentina) Carlos García
- (Argentina) José Maria Martínez
- (Argentina) Rodolfo Vicente
- (Bermuda) Clyde Best
- (Bermuda) Gary Darrell
- (Bermuda) Marcus Douglas
- (Bermuda) Irving Romaine
- (Bermuda) Lionel Smith
- (Canada) Antony Adams
- (Canada) Ike McKay
- (Cuba) Francisco Fariñas
- (Cuba) René Mico
- (Cuba) Ricardo Tsiba
- (Mexico) Manuel Cerda Canela
- (Mexico) Juan Dosal
- (Mexico) Luis Regueiro
- (Trinidad and Tobago) Andrew Aleong
- (Trinidad and Tobago) Victor Gamaldo
- (Trinidad and Tobago) Jeff Gellineau
- (Trinidad and Tobago) Tyronne Labastide
- (United States) Janos Benedek
- (United States) Jack Kinealy
- (United States) Ernie Tuchscherer

1 own goal

- (Bermuda) Rudolph Minors (against United States)
- (United States) Bob Gansler (against Bermuda)

Source: RSSSF
