= Julio Villanueva =

Peruvian footballer (born 1949)

- Villanueva in 1975

Personal information
- Full name: José Julio Villanueva Roca
- Date of birth: 22 October 1949 (age 77)
- Place of birth: Lima, Lima Province, Peru
- Position: Midfielder

Senior career*
Years	Team	Apps	(Gls)
1967–1968	Sporting Cristal		
1969–1971	Torreón		
1972	Deportivo Municipal		
1973	Melgar		
1974–1979	Deportivo Junín		
- * Club domestic league appearances and goals

José Julio Villanueva Roca (born 22 October 1949) is a Peruvian retired footballer. He played as a midfielder for Deportivo Junín within the Liga 1 in Peru as well as for Torreón within the Liga MX in Mexico.

== Club career ==
Villanueva emerged from the farming system of Sporting Cristal, making his senior debut during the inaugural 1967 Torneo Descentralizado in a match against Alianza Lima. He would experience his first taste of success during the following 1968 Torneo Descentralizado as the Celestes would win their third overall domestic title. However, his career in Cristal would be interrupted as following their promotion in the 1968–69 Mexican Segunda División, Torreón manager Grimaldo González and his assistant Federico Sagiante visited Peru in order to look for a central defender, a midfielder and a forward for the upcoming 1969–70 Mexican Primera División. Upon their search, González decided to sign Villanueva as well as his teammate Hugo Lobatón for the club with Guillermo Correa Bravo from Sport Boys soon joining them to fulfill the club's defender quota. Arriving at the Estadio San Isidro in March 1969, the three played throughout the 1969–70 season under the club's new manager Fernando "Gavilán" García with the club finding themselves near the bottom of the table by the end of the season. Despite the 1970 season seeing significant improvement in the club's overall performance, the 1970–71 season saw them at the middle of their group once more.

Following his contract expiring, Villanueva returned to Peru to play for Deportivo Municipal for their 1972 season where he played alongside Hugo Sotil and Manuel Mellán. Following a brief stint with Melgar for their professional debut season at the 1973 Torneo Descentralizado, he spent the remainder of his career with Deportivo Junín alongside Ángel Avilés, Eloy Martín Tizon, Marcos Portilla and César Echeandía before retiring following their 1979 season.

== Later life ==
Following his retirement as a player, Villanueva returned to Mexico where he later married a teacher from Saltillo. After initially living in Peru, his wife convinced him to move back to Saltillo with their daughters where he currently serves as a sports commentator.
