= Juan González (footballer, born 1945) =

Mexican footballer (born 1946)

Personal information
- Full name: Juan González Martínez
- Date of birth: 5 January 1945 (age 81)
- Place of birth: Mexico City, Mexico
- Position: Inside right

Senior career*
Years	Team	Apps	(Gls)
1962–1966	Poza Rica		
1966–1970	Monterrey		
1970–1973	Pachuca		
1973–1978	Monterrey		

International career
1967–1974	Mexico	3	(1)
Medal record
Men's football
Representing Mexico
CONCACAF Championship
Silver medal – second place	1967 Honduras	Team
- * Club domestic league appearances and goals

Juan González Martínez (born 5 January 1945) is a Mexican former footballer. Nicknamed "Juanito", he played as a right inside forward for Monterrey and Pachuca throughout the late 1960s and the 1970s. He also represented Mexico internationally for the 1967 CONCACAF Championship.

== Club career ==
González began his career with Poza Rica for the 1962–63 Mexican Segunda División. That season saw the club win the 1962–63 Copa México Segunda División with the 1963–64 edition also being won by the Petroleros. Despite this relative success within the cup, the club consistently kept narrowly missing out on promotion. Despite the club remaining stuck in the Segunda División, González caught the interest of Monterrey manager Mario Pérez who signed him for the 1966–67 season with his debut being on the first matchday on 23 July 1966. Throughout the first half of his career with the club, he played alongside other players such as Ángel Lama and Francisco Avilán as he scored a goal in the first ever match against Pachuca in a 3–2 victory despite the goals from Pachuca players Francisco Moacyr and Jesús Zárate Pérez. Ironically, González was then signed to play for the Tuzos beginning in the 1970–71 season following his final game with the Rayados on 11 October 1970 where he would stay for the following 3 seasons until returning to the Rayados for their 1973–74 season. Throughout his second tenure with Monterrey, he played with Francisco Solís Cruz and Francisco Bertocchi as they formed the midfield composition of the club. That season saw González being considered one of the best Mexican players throughout the mid-1970s. He could continue displaying success within the club until his final game on 29 April 1978 in a 2–3 loss against Tampico Madero.

== International career ==
González was called up to represent Mexico for the 1967 CONCACAF Championship where he made a single appearance against the 1–0 victory against Haiti on 14 March 1967. He later made another appearance on a friendly on 31 March 1974 in an 1–1 away draw against Brazil where he scored the equalizer.

== Personal life ==
Following his retirement, González stayed in Monterrey where he continues to follow his club through attending their home games.
