= Football at the 1966 Central American and Caribbean Games =

1966 Central American and Caribbean Games
Tournament details
- Host country: Puerto Rico
- City: San Juan
- Teams: 6 (from 1 confederation)
- Venue: 1 (in 1 host city)

Final positions
- Champions: Mexico (4th title)
- Runners-up: Netherlands Antilles
- Third place: Cuba
- Fourth place: El Salvador

Tournament statistics
- Matches played: 15
- Goals scored: 44 (2.93 per match)
- Top scorer(s): (Netherlands Antilles) Felix Angelico Perez (6 goals)

Football was contested for men only at the 1966 Central American and Caribbean Games in San Juan, Puerto Rico.

The gold medal was won by Mexico for the fourth time, who earned 10 points

Event	Gold	Silver	Bronze
Men's football	Mexico (MEX)	Netherlands Antilles (AHO)	Cuba (CUB)

== Participants ==
- Cuba
- El Salvador
- Jamaica
- Mexico
- Netherlands Antilles
- Puerto Rico (Hosts)

== Table ==
A 2 point system used.

Pos	Team	Pld	W	D	L	GF	GA	GD	Pts
1	Mexico (C)	5	5	0	0	11	2	+9	10
2	Netherlands Antilles	5	4	0	1	11	4	+7	8
3	Cuba	5	1	2	2	10	6	+4	4
4	El Salvador	5	1	2	2	5	9	−4	4
5	Jamaica	5	1	0	4	4	10	−6	2
6	Puerto Rico	5	0	2	3	3	13	−10	2

(C) Champions

== Results ==
12 June 1966

Puerto Rico	0–4	Netherlands Antilles
	Report	Dubero 31', 60'; Felix 51', 85'

Hiram Bithorn Stadium, San Juan
13 June 1966

Mexico	1–0	Jamaica
Torres 69'	Report

Hiram Bithorn Stadium, San Juan
13 June 1966

Cuba	0–0	El Salvador
	Report

Hiram Bithorn Stadium, San Juan
14 June 1966

Netherlands Antilles	1–0	Jamaica
Felix 80'	Report

Hiram Bithorn Stadium, San Juan
14 June 1966

Puerto Rico	0–2	Mexico
	Report	J. González 10'; Refugio 44'

Hiram Bithorn Stadium, San Juan
15 June 1966

Puerto Rico	1–1	Cuba
Piñeiro 30'	Report	Pozo 80'

Hiram Bithorn Stadium, San Juan
16 June 1966

Cuba	7–0	Jamaica
	Report

Hiram Bithorn Stadium, San Juan
16 June 1966

Mexico	5–2	El Salvador
Torres (?); Canela (?); J. González (?); Zárate (?)	Report	Deras (?)

Hiram Bithorn Stadium, San Juan
18 June 1966

Mexico	2–0	Netherlands Antilles
Canela 50'; J. González 60'	Report

Hiram Bithorn Stadium, San Juan
18 June 1966

Puerto Rico	2–2	El Salvador
? ?	Report	Díaz (?); Bracamonte (?)

Hiram Bithorn Stadium, San Juan
20 June 1966

El Salvador	1–0	Jamaica
Cañada 5'	Report

Hiram Bithorn Stadium, San Juan
20 June 1966

Netherlands Antilles	4–2	Cuba
Brete (?); Felix (?)	Report	? ?

Hiram Bithorn Stadium, San Juan
22 June 1966

Netherlands Antilles	2–0	El Salvador
Brete (?); Felix (?)	Report

Hiram Bithorn Stadium, San Juan
22 June 1966

Mexico	1–0	Cuba
Zárate 38'	Report

Hiram Bithorn Stadium, San Juan
22 June 1966

Puerto Rico	0–4	Jamaica
	Report

Hiram Bithorn Stadium, San Juan

1966 Central American and Caribbean Games

Mexico
4th title

== Statistics ==
=== Goalscorers ===
There were 44 goals scored in 15 matches, for an average of 2.93 goals per match.

6 goals

- (Netherlands Antilles) Felix Angelico Perez

3 goals

- (Netherlands Antilles) Bernardo Brete
- (Mexico) Genaro Torres
- (Mexico) Juan González

2 goals

- (Netherlands Antilles) Benito Dubero
- (El Salvador) Miguel Ángel Deras
- (Mexico) Jesús Zárate Pérez
- (Mexico) Manuel Cerda Canela

1 goal

- (Cuba) Félix Pozo
- (Mexico) Refugio Fernández
- (Puerto Rico) Rubén Piñeiro
- (El Salvador) Ricardo Díaz
- (El Salvador) José Luis Bracamonte
- (El Salvador) Manuel Cañada
