= Mariano Ubiracy =

Brazilian footballer (1942–2015)

Personal information
- Full name: Mariano Ubiracy da Silva
- Date of birth: 16 July 1942
- Place of birth: Leopoldina, Minas Gerais, Brazil
- Date of death: 5 May 2015 (aged 72)
- Place of death: Taubaté, São Paulo, Brazil
- Position: Forward

Senior career*
Years	Team	Apps	(Gls)
1960–1961	Olímpia		
1962–1963	XV de Piracicaba		
1964–1965	Fluminense		
1965–1975	Veracruz		(98)
1970–1971	→ Jalisco (loan)		(7)
1971–1972	→ Irapuato (loan)		(6)
1975–1977	Quevedo		
- * Club domestic league appearances and goals

Mariano Ubiracy da Silva (16 July 1942 – 5 May 2015) was a Brazilian footballer. He spent his career across Brazil, Mexico and Ecuador, notably playing for Veracruz throughout the 1960s and the 1970s where he was the top scorer for the club on various occasions.

== Career ==
Mariano Ubiracy began his professional career with Olímpia before shortly moving to XV de Piracicaba in early 1962. His talents attracted the attention of Fluminense who signed him for the 1964 season. He found immediate success with his inaugural season with the club, winning the 1964 Campeonato Carioca. During the middle of the 1965 season, Veracruz expressed interest in the young footballer and later chose to sign him for the 1965–66 season following fellow Brazilian Didi inviting Ubiracy to the club. The 1966–67 season saw one of his best performances as he scored 20 goals, narrowly losing out to fellow Brazilian footballer Amaury Epaminondas for the top scorer of the tournament as well as play as a substitute player for Monterrey during a friendly against Atlético Madrid held on 30 May 1967 where Ubiracy himself scored the lone goal in a 1–1 draw following an assist by Raúl Chávez. During the 1967–68 Mexican Primera División, he was at a constant battle with Bernardo Hernández Villaseñor of Atlas for the top scorer of the tournament with Hernández coming on top with 19 goals compared to Ubiracy's 17. Throughout his career with Veracruz, he usually played with fellow Fluminense player Batata as the two were typically top goalscorers for the club.

By the end of his first tenure with the Tiburones Rojos, he scored ninety goals as he was loaned out to Jalisco in the 1970–71 season and Irapuato in the following 1971–72 season. During his career with Irapuato, the club had made the relegation playoffs against Torreón on 15 July 1972. La Trinca was losing 1–0 and it seemed that the match was lost. However, around the very end of the match, a penalty kick was granted to Irapuato with Ubiracy given the role to shoot. However, Torreón goalkeeper René Vizcaíno had managed to predict Ubiracy's movements and block his attempted goal, securing Irapuato's relegation from the top-flight of Mexican football. On the ride home, several fans had found out where Ubiracy was staying and had organized a mob as they attempted to burn his house down though the mob dispersed soon after. He returned to Veracruz for the 1972–73 season and scored an additional eight goals that season. He then spent the remainder of his career with Ecuadorian club Quevedo until 1977 when he retired from professional football.

== Personal life ==
Ubiracy met his wife in Veracruz and later had two children with her and was the grandfather of three. Pachuca footballer Mario Montaño had described Ubiracy as being one of the best forwards of the Liga MX throughout the 1970s.

He died on 5 May 2015 in Taubaté.
