= Harold Hansen (soccer) =

Canadian association footballer (born 1946)

Personal information
- Date of birth: May 24, 1946 (age 80)
- Place of birth: Vancouver, British Columbia, Canada
- Height: 1.70 m (5 ft 7 in)
- Position: Forward

Senior career*
Years	Team	Apps	(Gls)
1968	Washington Darts		
1968	Atlanta Chiefs	1	(0)
- Croatia SC

International career
1967	Canada U23	7	(4)
1968	Canada	3	(0)
- * Club domestic league appearances and goals

Harold Hansen (born May 24, 1946) is a Canadian former professional soccer player who earned two caps for the national team in 1967 (U23) and 1968 (Senior). He also represented Canada at the 1967 Pan American Games.

In 1968, he spent the season with the Washington Darts of the American Soccer League and the Atlanta Chiefs of the North American Soccer League. In 1969, he was part of the British Columbia U-23 team which won the Canadian Soccer Association Challenge Cup. During the 1969-1970 PCSL season, he played for Croatia SC.
