= Hugo Lobatón =

Peruvian footballer (1941–2015)

- Lobatón in 1968

Personal information
- Full name: Adrián Hugo Lobatón Gálvez
- Date of birth: 4 March 1941
- Place of birth: Chincha Alta, Ica Peru
- Date of death: 4 May 2015 (aged 66)
- Place of death: Lima, Lima Province, Peru
- Position: Forward

Senior career*
Years	Team	Apps	(Gls)
1960–1961	Defensor Lima		
1962–1969	Sporting Cristal		
1968	→ Juan Aurich (loan)		
1969–1971	Torreón		
1971–1972	Irapuato		
1973	Juan Aurich		
1974	Barcelona		
- * Club domestic league appearances and goals

Adrián Hugo Lobatón Gálvez (4 March 1941 – 4 May 2015) was a Peruvian footballer. He played as a forward for Sporting Cristal and Juan Aurich within the Peruvian Liga 1 and for Torreón and Irapuato within the Liga MX throughout the 1960s and the 1970s.

== Club career ==
Lobatón began his career within Defensor Lima through a friendly against Ciclista Lima in 1960 before making his professional debut in the following 1961 Peruvian Primera División. However, he spent the majority of the 1960s with Sporting Cristal with players that would later compose of Peru's 1970 FIFA World Cup squad such as Luis Rubiños, Eloy Campos, Orlando de la Torre, Roberto Elías, Alberto Gallardo and José del Castillo. His biggest appearances came during friendlies against major European clubs at the time such as Barcelona and Dynamo Moscow with Lobatón causing Lev Yashin's expulsion from the match, allowing for Campos to score the winning goal. Despite his long career within Cristal, the only other title the Celestes would win during the decade came during the 1968 Torneo Descentralizado. However, he was then loaned to Juan Aurich where he played alongside Próspero Merino, Nemesio Mosquera and Eladio Reyes. Following an uneventful return to Cristal in February 1969, Mexican club Torreón had took an interest in signing Peruvian players for the club as soon, Lobatón and fellow Peruvian footballers Guillermo Correa Bravo and Julio Villanueva found themselves bound for the Estadio San Isidro.

Throughout his career within the Liga MX, his debut 1969–70 season had been incredibly poor for the club, finding themselves near the very bottom of the tournament bracket. However, the subsequent 1970 season saw significant improvement as Torreón found themselves leading their group within the first round though they only managed to achieve eighth place within the final stage with a similar performance in the 1970–71 season. He spent an additional season in Mexico for Irapuato though the 1971–72 season had been so poor to the point of relegation from the top-flight of Mexican football. Following an additional season with Juan Aurich for the 1973 Torneo Descentralizado, he chose to play abroad once more in Ecuador for Barcelona for the 1974 Campeonato Ecuatoriano de Fútbol Serie A alongside his former Sporting Cristal teammate Orlando de la Torre. Throughout the season, the Toreros narrowly missed the final round at just third place within their group as Lobatón retired shortly after.

== Personal life ==
Hugo was a part of the first generation of the Lobatón family as many footballers emerged to play professional careers within Peru. His half-brothers Pablo and Luis Lobatón Donayre saw themselves playing for Sporting Cristal and Esther Grande throughout the 1980s respectively. His other half-brother Carlos also played for Cristal throughout the 1990s, winning the 1991 Torneo Descentralizado. His cousins Manuel and Abel Lobatón Vesgas also played throughout the 1980s with Abel having a distinguished career in Colombia. His nephews Carlos, Abel and Jhilmar Lobatón Espejo would continue the family legacy within Cristal throughout the 2000s and 2010s.

Hugo died on 4 May 2015 at his home in Lima.
