= Jorge Hurtarte =

Guatemalan footballer

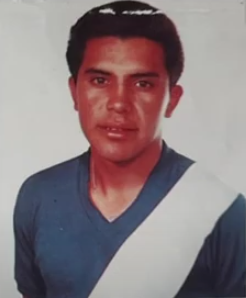

Personal information
- Date of birth: 23 April 1944 (age 82)
- Position: Midfielder

International career
Years	Team	Apps	(Gls)
- Guatemala
Medal record
Men's football
Representing Guatemala
CONCACAF Championship
Winner	1967 Honduras

Jorge Hurtarte (born 23 April 1944) is a Guatemalan former footballer. He competed in the men's tournament at the 1976 Summer Olympics.

== Honours ==
Guatemala

- CONCACAF Championship: 1967
