= Maple Club (Trinidad) =

Maple
- Full name: Maple Club
- Founded: 1917
- League: T&T Northern Football Association League
Home colours

Maple Club are a football team from Port of Spain, Trinidad and Tobago. Founded in 1917, their most successful period occurred in the 1950s and 1960s, where they dominated the Port of Spain Football League, the highest league in Trinidadian and Tobagonian Football.
