= Aldwin Ferguson =

Trinidad and Tobago footballer

Personal information
- Date of birth: 23 March 1935
- Date of death: 28 August 2008 (aged 73)
- Position: Defender

Senior career*
Years	Team	Apps	(Gls)
1951–?	BP-Palo Seco		
?–1970	Maple		

International career
1965–1967	Trinidad and Tobago	5	(0)
Medal record
Men's football
Representing Trinidad and Tobago
Pan American Games
Bronze medal – third place	1967 Winnipeg
- * Club domestic league appearances and goals

Aldwin Ferguson (23 March 1935 – 28 August 2008) was a Trinidad and Tobago footballer.

== Honours ==
Trinidad and Tobago

- Pan American Games: Bronze medalist, 1967
