= Grimaldo González =

Peruvian footballer and manager (1922–2007)

Personal information
- Date of birth: 22 September 1922
- Place of birth: Lima, Peru
- Date of death: 14 February 2007 (aged 84)
- Place of death: Gómez Palacio, Durango, Mexico
- Position: Forward

Senior career*
Years	Team	Apps	(Gls)
1946–1947	ADO de Orizaba		
1947–1949	Veracruz		
1952–1954	Tampico		

Managerial career
- 1962–1963: Tampico
- 1968–1969: Torreón
- 1971–1972: Tigres de la UANL
- 1972–1973: Ciudad Madero
- * Club domestic league appearances and goals

Grimaldo González (22 September 1922 – 14 February 2007) was a professional football player and manager who spent most of his career in the Mexican Primera División.

== Playing career ==
Born in Lima, González played as a forward. In 1946, he moved to Mexico to play for ADO de Orizaba. He joined Veracruz the following season, but would enjoy his greatest success with Tampico by winning the 1952–53 season championship. Tampico clinched the title in the penultimate round, winning 1–0 against Club América with González scoring the winning goal.

== Managerial career ==
After he retired from playing, González became a football coach. He managed Tampico, Torreón, Tigres de la UANL and Ciudad Madero. He would lead Torreón, Tigres and Ciudad Madero to promotions to the Mexican Primera División.

== Personal life ==
González died in Gómez Palacio at age 84.
