= Lawrence Rondon =

Trinidadian footballer (1949–2018)

Personal information
- Date of birth: 4 September 1949
- Date of death: 29 June 2018 (aged 68)
- Position: Defender

Senior career*
Years	Team	Apps	(Gls)
- St. Benedict's College

International career
1968–1976	Trinidad and Tobago		
Medal record
Men's football
Representing Trinidad and Tobago
CONCACAF Championship
Runner-up	1973 Haiti
- * Club domestic league appearances and goals

Lawrence Rondon (4 September 1949 – 29 June 2018) was a Trinidadian professional footballer who played as a defender.

As a player, he was involved in the Trinidad and Tobago national team's unsuccessful qualifying campaigns for the 1970 and 1974 FIFA World Cups, the 1969 CONCACAF Championship and the 1975 Pan American Games football tournament.

He died on 29 June 2018.

== Honours ==
Trinidad and Tobago

- CONCACAF Championship : Runner-up, 1973
