= Luis Enrique Fernández =

Mexican footballer (born 1951)

Personal information
- Full name: Luis Enrique Fernández Figueroa
- Date of birth: May 29, 1951 (age 75)
- Place of birth: Mexico
- Position: Defender

Senior career*
| Years | Team | Apps | (Gls) |
| 1975–1978 | Puebla | | |
| 1979–1981 | Atlante | | |
| 1982–1984 | Puebla | | |
| 1992–1993 | U de Guadalajara | | |
- * Club domestic league appearances and goals

Luis Enrique Fernández Figueroa (born May 22, 1951) is a Mexican former footballer, who played most of his career with Puebla F.C.

== Club career ==
He began his career with them in the mid-1970s, when the club had been promoted from the Segunda División. In the 1970s, he was a key player with Puebla's promotion and avoiding various relegation tournaments. In 1978 he transferred to Atlante F.C., where he played until 1981. In 1982, he returned to Puebla, where in 1982 he helped the club win its first Primera División Profesional against Chivas in a memorable penalty shootout where he scored the final goal to clinch the title. He played one more year with the club and then retired, but returned in 1992 to play one more year for Club Universidad de Guadalajara.

== Achievements ==
- Primera División Mexicana 1982-83
