= Jesús Zárate Pérez =

Mexican footballer (1943–2019)

- Zárate (left) in a match against Querétaro

Personal information
- Full name: Jesús Zárate Pérez
- Date of birth: 25 May 1943
- Place of birth: Querétaro, State of Querétaro, Mexico
- Date of death: 23 May 2019 (aged 75)
- Place of death: Querétaro, State of Querétaro, Mexico
- Position: Forward

Youth career
- ???–1961: Querétaro
- 1961–1963: Pachuca

Senior career*
Years	Team	Apps	(Gls)
1963–1971	Pachuca		(39)

International career
1966	Mexico	6	(2)
Medal record
Men's football
Representing Mexico
Central American and Caribbean Games
Gold medal – first place	Puerto Rico 1966	Team
- * Club domestic league appearances and goals

Jesús Zárate Pérez (25 May 1943 – 23 May 2019) was a Mexican footballer. Nicknamed "Chucho", he played for Pachuca throughout his entire career, commonly being the top goalscorer for the club throughout the 1960s to the early 1970s. He also briefly represented Mexico for the 1966 Central American and Caribbean Games, winning the tournament.

== Club career ==
Zárate began his career by playing for his native Querétaro throughout his youth career. Beginning in 1961, he chose to play for Pachuca after los Tuzos noted his talents throughout his youth career. For the 1963–64 Mexican Primera División, Zárate made his professional debut for the club. He cited his success in scoring goals in home game matches within the Estadio Revolución Mexicana. He was also notable for never smoking nor drinking as well as often wanting to visit his home city of Querétaro whenever the club had away matches against Guadalajara. The 1966–67 Mexican Segunda División was notable for the club as Zárate help contribute to the club reaching the top-flight of Mexican football.

During their first ever away match against Monterrey for the 1967–68 Mexican Primera División on 28 October 1967, Zárate scored vital equalizer after Monterrey player Juan González Martínez scored the first goal in the match with his teammate Francisco Moacyr soon initially making the match a 2–1 lead. However, Rayados players Francisco Avilán and Ángel Lama and soon made it a 3–2 loss. Despite this, Zárate found more success in the following 1968–69 Mexican Primera División, scoring ten goals that season alone.

Zárate went on to play his entire senior career for Pachuca until the 1970–71 Mexican Primera División where he retired soon after with 39 goals throughout his career.

== International career ==
Zárate made six appearances throughout the 1966 Central American and Caribbean Games in the football tournament. He made his debut on 13 June 1966 in a 1–0 victory against Jamaica. He later scored two goals against El Salvador and Cuba respectively, contributing to the team winning gold at the tournament.

== Personal life ==
Zárate later became a merchant following his retirement from professional football.

He died on 23 May 2019.
