= Willy Gómez =

Mexican footballer (1950–2025)

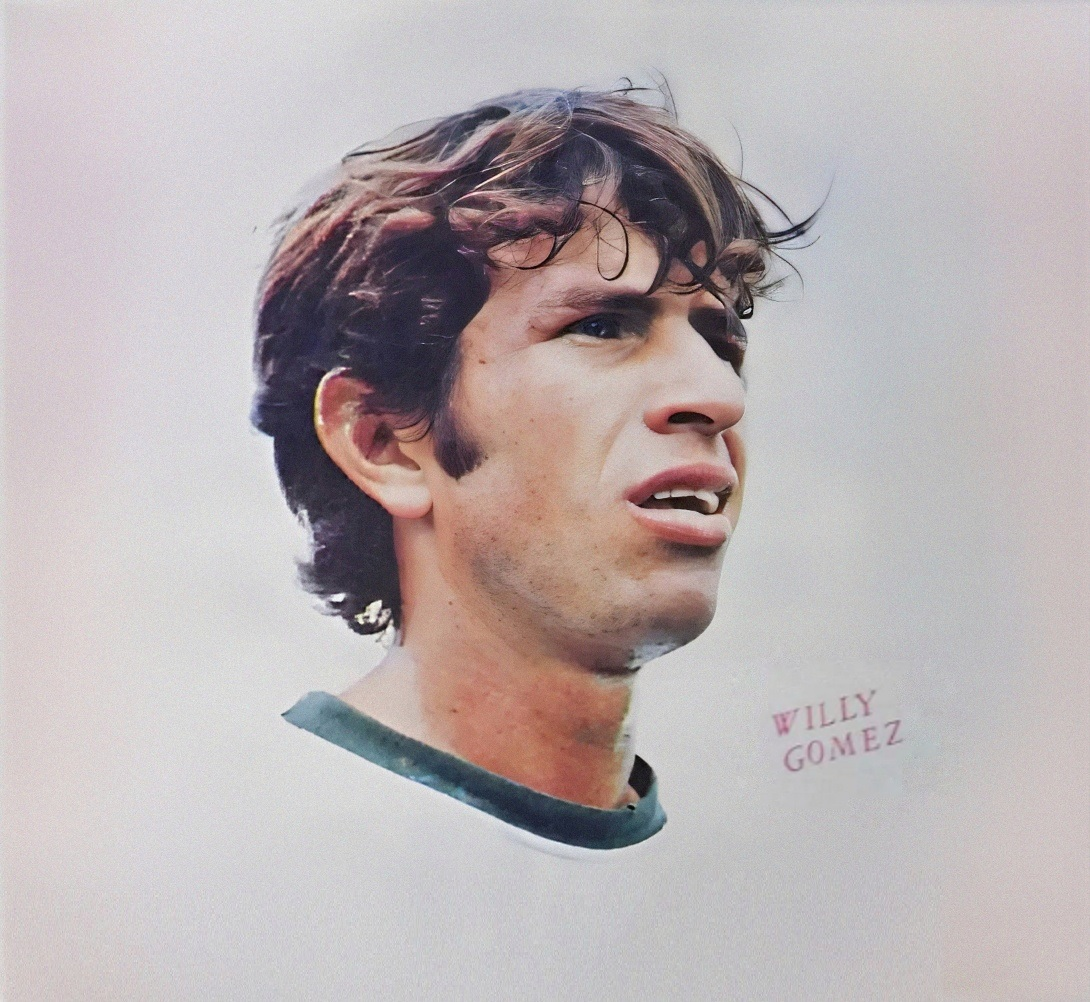

Personal information
- Full name: Raúl Gómez Ramírez
- Date of birth: 13 February 1950
- Place of birth: Guadalajara, Jalisco, Mexico
- Date of death: 1 February 2025 (aged 74)
- Place of death: Guadalajara, Jalisco, Mexico
- Position: Midfielder

Youth career
- 1964–1967: Oro

Senior career*
Years	Team	Apps	(Gls)
1967–1976	Guadalajara		

International career
1970	Mexico	7	(1)
- * Club domestic league appearances and goals

Raúl Gómez Ramírez (13 February 1950 – 1 February 2025), better known as Willy Gómez, was a Mexican footballer. He played as a midfielder for Guadalajara throughout his entire career. He also briefly represented Mexico during the 1970s.

== Club career ==
Born in Guadalajara, Gómez began playing football at the age of 7 and excelled at a young age to the point of catching police attention as playing football on the streets was prohibited at the time. He entered the youth ranks of Oro when he was 12 years of age. He was later signed to play for the senior squad of Guadalajara for the 1967–68 season. He was later a part of the winning squad that won the 1969–70 Mexican Primera División along with the annual Copa MX and the Campeón de Campeones due to winning both tournaments that very season. Even with the club entering a difficult era during the 1970s, he proved himself to be an exceptional and irreplaceable player with shining moments such as his game against Cruz Azul in 1972. He retired from professional football following the 1975–76 season, playing thirteen seasons with the club.

== International career ==
Gómez represented Mexico on at least seven occasions along with scoring a single goal. His debut was in a 1–0 friendly victory against Peru on 8 March 1970, a few months before the 1970 FIFA World Cup.

== Personal life ==
Gómez died on 13 February 2025 at Perla Tapatía at Guadalajara. A moment of silence was given to Gómez as tribute during the match between Guadalajara and Querétaro that same day.
