= Martín Ibarreche =

Mexican footballer (born 1943)

Personal information
- Full name: Martín Ibarreche Vásquez
- Date of birth: 11 November 1943 (age 82)
- Place of birth: Torreón, Coahuila, Mexico
- Position: Defender

Senior career*
Years	Team	Apps	(Gls)
1960–1962	Torreón		
1962–1969	América		
1969–1970	Toluca		
1970–1977	Puebla		
- * Club domestic league appearances and goals

Martín Ibarreche Vásquez is a Mexican former footballer.

== Career ==
He started his career in the Primera Division in 1960 with newly formed Club de Fútbol Torreón where he played two years and later moved to play with América where he played seven years; at the latter he won one league title in the 1965–1966 tournament. In 1969, he had a short stay with club Toluca. In 1970, he joined the recently promoted Puebla F.C., where he played for seven years where he finished his career in 1977.

Ibarreche's grandfather, Lázaro, was also a professional footballer who played for clubs in Mexico.

== Achievements ==
- Mexican Primera División: 1964-1965
