= 1969–70 Mexican Primera División season =

27th professional season of the top-flight football league in Mexico

Primera División de México
- Season: 1969–70
- Champions: Guadalajara (8th title)
- Matches: 240
- Goals: 632 (2.63 per match)

Statistics of the Primera División de México for the 1969–70 season.

== Overview ==
Torreón was promoted to Primera División.

The season was contested by 16 teams, and Guadalajara won the championship.

No relegation this season, due to the increase of teams to 18 for the 1970-71 season.

=== Teams ===
Location of the 1969-70 Primera División teams

Team	City	Stadium
América	Mexico City	Azteca
Atlante	Mexico City	Azteca
Atlas	Guadalajara, Jalisco	Jalisco
Cruz Azul	Jasso, Hidalgo	10 de Diciembre
Guadalajara	Guadalajara, Jalisco	Jalisco
Irapuato	Irapuato, Guanajuato	Irapuato
Laguna	Torreón, Coahuila	San Isidro
León	León, Guanajuato	León
Monterrey	Monterrey, Nuevo León	Tecnológico
Necaxa	Mexico City	Azteca
Oro	Guadalajara, Jalisco	Jalisco
Pachuca	Pachuca, Hidalgo	Revolución Mexicana
Toluca	Toluca, State of Mexico	Luis Gutiérrez Dosal
Torreón	Torreón, Coahuila	Revolución
UNAM	Mexico City	Olímpico Universitario
Veracruz	Veracruz, Veracruz	Veracruzano

== League standings ==
Pos	Team	Pld	W	D	L	GF	GA	GD	Pts	Qualification
1	Guadalajara	30	18	9	3	54	24	+30	45	Champions
2	Cruz Azul	30	14	11	5	40	19	+21	39	
3	Veracruz	30	16	7	7	47	36	+11	39	
4	Toluca	30	13	7	10	46	35	+11	33	
5	Necaxa	30	11	11	8	32	26	+6	33	
6	América	30	12	7	11	50	49	+1	31	
7	León	30	11	9	10	43	43	0	31	
8	Pachuca	30	11	7	12	41	49	−8	29	
9	Monterrey	30	9	10	11	39	41	−2	28	
10	Atlante	30	10	8	12	51	55	−4	28	
11	Oro	30	10	7	13	41	58	−17	27	
12	Atlas	30	8	10	12	25	37	−12	26	
13	UNAM	30	8	9	13	42	43	−1	25	
14	Irapuato	30	8	8	14	26	36	−10	24	
15	Torreón	30	5	13	12	24	37	−13	23	
16	Laguna	30	6	7	17	31	44	−13	19	No Relegation

1969–70 winners

8th title

== Results ==
Home \ Away	AME	ATE	ATS	CAZ	GDL	IRA	LAG	LEO	MTY	NEC	ORO	PAC	TOL	TOR	UNM	VER
América	—	1–2	1–0	1–4	1–4	1–0	3–0	2–2	4–3	0–1	6–2	1–1	3–2	3–0	1–3	0–1
Atlante	0–3	—	2–1	0–2	1–3	3–1	4–2	1–1	0–2	3–1	5–2	1–1	2–3	0–0	5–2	5–1
Atlas	1–1	1–2	—	0–0	1–3	2–1	1–0	1–0	2–2	2–1	1–1	1–0	1–0	1–1	1–1	0–0
Cruz Azul	2–2	5–1	0–0	—	0–0	1–0	3–1	4–0	2–2	1–0	3–0	1–2	0–0	0–0	1–1	2–0
Guadalajara	3–1	1–0	5–1	1–0	—	2–2	2–0	0–1	1–0	1–2	3–0	4–1	2–2	1–0	4–1	1–1
Irapuato	1–2	3–1	1–0	0–1	4–2	—	0–0	1–1	0–1	0–1	1–3	2–1	0–1	1–0	0–1	1–1
Laguna	0–2	0–1	2–0	2–3	1–2	3–1	—	1–1	2–1	0–0	3–0	0–0	0–0	0–0	2–2	0–1
León	3–1	1–0	0–0	2–0	1–1	1–1	4–2	—	1–2	1–3	3–0	4–1	3–2	1–1	3–2	0–1
Monterrey	1–1	2–2	2–1	1–1	0–0	1–1	0–3	2–0	—	0–1	3–2	3–1	0–3	0–0	2–0	2–3
Necaxa	0–0	1–1	3–0	0–0	0–1	0–0	2–1	2–1	0–0	—	3–0	2–2	0–0	1–1	1–0	1–3
Oro	4–2	1–1	3–1	1–0	0–0	1–0	2–1	1–2	0–2	0–0	—	4–1	2–1	1–1	3–2	1–1
Pachuca	3–2	4–2	0–0	0–2	0–1	3–1	2–0	4–2	4–2	0–3	1–3	—	2–1	1–1	1–0	2–0
Toluca	1–2	4–2	1–2	1–0	2–2	0–0	1–0	1–0	2–1	2–1	5–1	1–1	—	2–1	3–1	3–0
Torreón	1–2	1–1	2–1	0–1	0–1	0–1	0–3	0–0	1–1	3–2	1–0	3–1	2–1	—	1–3	1–4
UNAM	0–0	2–2	0–1	0–0	1–1	2–1	1–0	3–3	2–1	3–0	2–2	0–1	2–0	1–1	—	2–2
Veracruz	3–1	3–1	2–1	1–1	0–2	0–1	5–2	3–1	1–0	0–0	3–1	3–0	2–1	2–1	0–2	—

Updated to match(es) played on 28 December 1969. Source: RSSSF
Legend: Blue = home team win; Yellow = draw; Red = away team win.

== Top scorers ==
Player	Nationality	Goals	Club
Vicente Pereda	Mexico	20	Toluca
Horacio López Salgado	Mexico	19	América
Mariano Ubiracy	Brazil	15	Veracruz
José Luis Aussín	Mexico	12	Veracruz
José Luis Martínez	Mexico	12	Oro
Luis Estrada	Mexico	12	León
José Berico	Brazil	11	Oro
Mario Velarde	Mexico	10	Pumas UNAM
Sergio Anaya	Mexico	10	León
Bernardo Hernández	Mexico	10	Atlante
Ernesto Cisneros	Mexico	10	Atlante
Coco Gómez	Mexico	10	América
