= Julio Fonseca (footballer) =

Honduran footballer

Personal information
- Full name: Julio César Fonseca
- Place of birth: Honduras
- Position: Winger

Senior career*
Years	Team	Apps	(Gls)
1965–1974	Marathón	69	(19)

International career
??–??	Honduras	?	(?)
- * Club domestic league appearances and goals

Julio César Fonseca was a retired Honduran football player who played for Marathón in the 1960s.

== Club career ==
Nicknamed Cucaracha, Fonseca scored 19 league goals for Marathón. He was a member of the so-called La Trinca Infernal (The Infernal Lashing), along with Mario Caballero and Mauro Caballero.

== Retirement ==
In 1974, Fonseca retired from professional football after Mario, one of his teammates at Marathón, had an accident which leave him invalid.
