= Gamaliel Ramírez =

Mexican footballer (born 1946)

Personal information
- Full name: Gamaliel de Jesús Ramírez Andrade
- Date of birth: 24 August 1946 (age 80)
- Place of birth: Guadalajara, Jalisco, Mexico
- Position: Right-back

Senior career*
Years	Team	Apps	(Gls)
1963–1972	Atlas		
1972–1973	Jalisco		
1973–1974	Veracruz		
1974–1976	Jalisco		
1976–1977	Atlas		

International career
1967–1970	Mexico	8	(0)
- * Club domestic league appearances and goals

Gamaliel de Jesús Ramírez Andrade (born 24 August 1946) is a Mexican former football player and politician. As a footballer, he played for Atlas and Jalisco throughout the 1960s and 1970s. He also represented Mexico internationally for the 1967 CONCACAF Championship. As a politician, he served the Institutional Revolutionary Party, running for a municipal seat for his home city of Guadalajara in 2010 as well as serving as a secretary for the sports department of the party prior to that.

== Football career ==
=== Club career ===
Ramírez began his career by playing for amateur clubs in his home city such as Don Bosco where he initially played as a center forward. When he made his professional debut with Atlas in 1963, he began playing as a right-back and spent his career highlights under manager Árpád Fekete. His first success came in the 1967–68 Copa México where the club won their 4th title in the tournament with this success later continuing after the club won the 1971–72 Mexican Segunda División. Immediately following this achievement however, he moved to Jalisco, citing having a higher potential to do more in Jalisco over Atlas as he had played for Los Rojinegros for nearly a decade by that point. He continued playing for either Jalisco or Atlas for the remainder of his career with a brief tenure for Veracruz during the 1973–74 season.

=== International career ===
Ramírez was named as a part of the 22-man squad for the 1967 CONCACAF Championship but wouldn't play a single game for the tournament. He was also chosen as part of a preliminary squad to play in the 1970 FIFA World Cup but would miss the final cut due to injury around the start of the tournament. He returned to play for El Tricolor for an away friendly against Brazil on 30 September 1970 as a part of an experimental project by manager Javier de la Torre to use younger players such as Willy Gómez, Pedro Damián Álvarez and Pedro Herrada.

=== Other ===
Alongside other Mexican international footballers of the 1970s, Ramírez participated in a charity game against a team composed of prominent 1970s German footballers to raise funds for children in poverty due to the 1985 Mexico City earthquake.

== Political career ==
Having graduated in 1967 as a metallurgical chemist, by 1971, Ramírez had a bachelor's degree in economics. He began serving as a secretary for sports for the Institutional Revolutionary Party on 27 June 1981. By 2010, he was made president of the sports committee and youth attention as he ran for a municipal seat in his home city of Guadalajara.
