= Manuel Cerda =

Mexican footballer (born 1945)

Personal information
- Full name: Manuel Cerda Canela
- Date of birth: 19 April 1945 (age 81)
- Place of birth: Jiquilpan de Juárez, Michoacán, Mexico
- Position: Left winger

Senior career*
Years	Team	Apps	(Gls)
1962–1966	Poza Rica		
1966–1971	Toluca		
1971–1975	Zacatepec		
1975–1976	Veracruz		
1976–1978	Atlético Potosino		
1978–1979	Atlas		

International career
1966–1967	Mexico	9	(3)
- * Club domestic league appearances and goals

Manuel Cerda Canela (born 19 April 1945) is a Mexican football player and manager. As a player, he primarily played for Toluca and Zacatepec throughout the 1960s and the 1970s.

== Club career ==
Cerda made his debut for Poza Rica during the 1962–63 Mexican Segunda División where the club would nearly be promoted that season, losing out by just two points to play in the top-flight of Mexican football. This trend of narrowly missing out qualification to the Primera División would continue for all of Cerda's tenure with the club before he switched over to Toluca for the 1966–67 season. He would be a part of a generation that included players such as Albino Morales, Vicente Pereda, Jesús Romero Reyes, Amaury Epaminondas, Carlos García Carrasco and Francisco Linares. He would also spend a majority of his career with manager Ignacio Trelles with Cerda having a fond memory of Trelles' coaching style as well as his personality. Cerda's career highlights would be under Trelles as he was part of the winning squads for the Mexican Primera División and the Campeón de Campeones for the 1966–67 season with the club winning both tournaments once more for the following 1967–68 season.

Throughout the 1970s, he played for Zacatepec and Veracruz. He notably played in the disastrous 1972–73 season where the club narrowly avoided relegation after winning the relegation playoffs against Pachuca. Notably, during his final season as a player, he chose to play for Toluca's main rivals Atlas for the 1978–79 season.

== International career ==
Cerda was first called up to represent Mexico for the 1966 Central American and Caribbean Games where he made 5 appearances and scored two goals in the tournament. He made three more appearances during the 1967 CONCACAF Championship, including another goal against Trinidad and Tobago.

== Personal life ==
His son Emmanuel Cerda is also a professional footballer who also briefly represented Mexico internationally as well as play for Tigres UANL throughout a majority of his career.

During a match between his former club of Zacatepec and Inter de Acapulco, he was given his first homage for his career with the club as a "Cañero".
