= Benito Pardo =

Spanish footballer (born 1954)

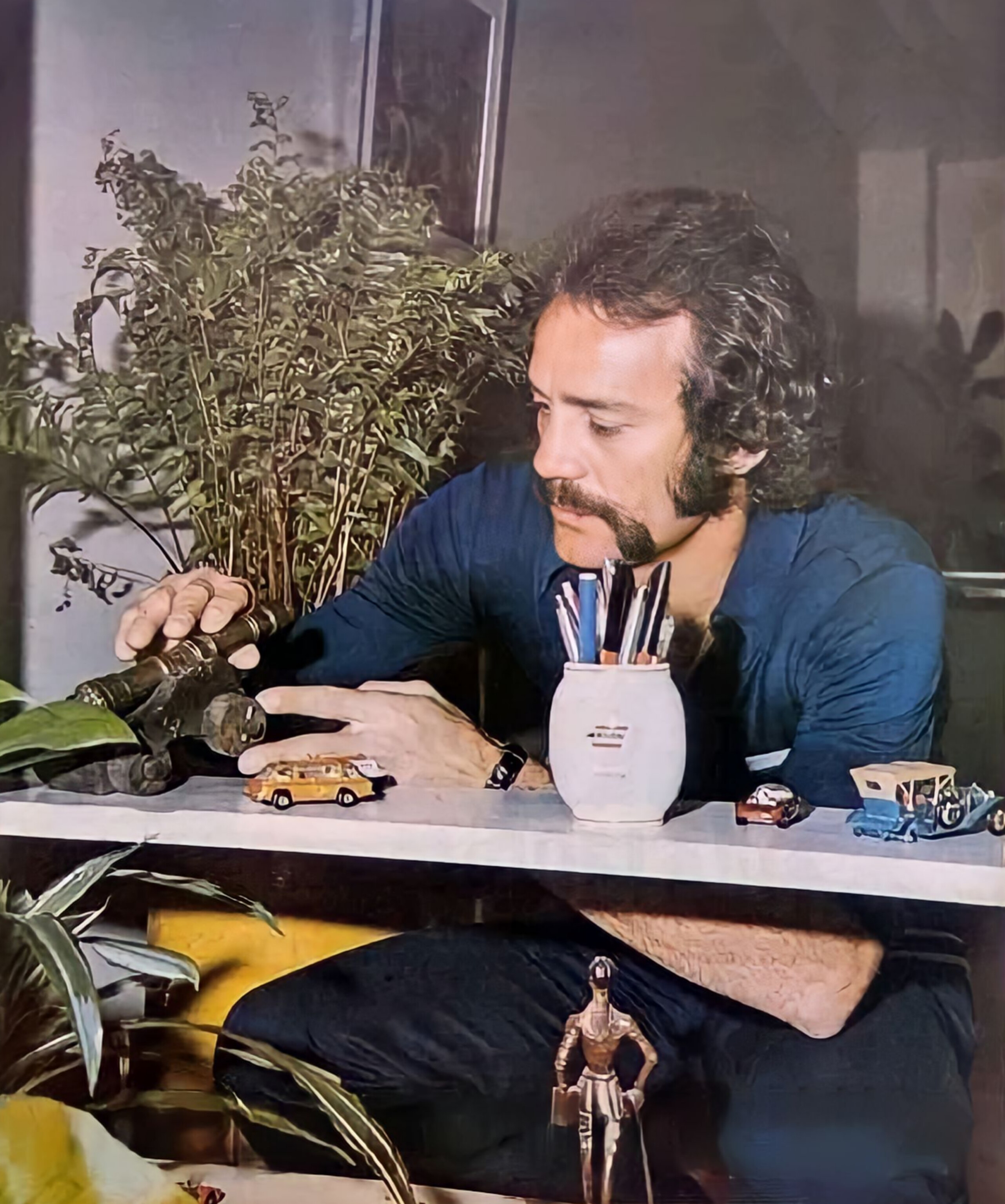
- Pardo in 1978

Personal information
- Full name: Benito Pardo Casasnovas
- Date of birth: 25 December 1945 (age 80)
- Place of birth: Ponteareas, Galicia, Spain
- Position: Midfielder

Senior career*
Years	Team	Apps	(Gls)
1969–1970	Pachuca		
1970–1972	Puebla		
1972–1978	Atlético Español		
1978–1979	Cruz Azul		
- * Club domestic league appearances and goals

Benito Pardo Casasnovas (born 25 December 1945) is a retired Spanish football player and manager who served as president of Cruz Azul from 1 August 1979 to 23 June 1981. He also served in various managerial positions of Mexico's national teams from 1988 to 1992 following the departure of Emilio Maurer Espinosa from the Mexican Football Federation and César Luis Menotti from the technical position. He also served as manager for Cruz Azul in the early 2000s. As a player, he played as a midfielder throughout the 1970s in Mexico, playing for Pachuca, Puebla, Atlético Español and Cruz Azul. He notably achieved the Balón de Oro in the midfielder title for the very first edition of the 1974–1975 season.

As president of Puebla, at the behest from club owner Jorge Suárez, he attracted several Spanish players to the club such as Pirri, Juan Manuel Asensi and Santiago Idígoras as well as other internationals such as Muricy Ramalho and Muricy Ramalho.

== Career ==
Pardo was born on 25 December 1945 in Puenteareas, Pontevedra Province in Galicia. Growing up in a post-war Francoist Spain, in 1957, he moved with his mother and siblings to Tuxtla Gutiérrez, Chiapas at the age of 12 where his father was already working in and Pardo spent the rest of his education in Mexico.

Beginning his university career at the Monterrey Institute of Technology and Higher Education, he also began to play for the football club at the school, already having experience from clubs in Chiapas. After receiving his degree, he moved to Mexico City to accelerate his footballing career, beginning a short stint with Real Celta in the amateur Liga Española in Mexico, being part of the winning 1968 squad.

His success attracted the attention of Pachuca owner and journalist Germán Corona del Rosal who would recommend Pardo to the senior squad in a series of tryouts where he was successfully signed for a single season as a professional player. Around this time, Pardo also began to study at the University of Pachuca for business administration. Throughout the middle of the 1970 season however, Pardo would end up resigning from the club following personal arguments with club manager György Marik and later return to work in Mexico City. This resulted in talent scout Manuel Díaz Loredo to offer Pardo a position in senior squad for Puebla which had recently achieved promotion to the 1970–71 Mexican Primera División and would successfully sign him following convoluted negotiations with Pachuca.

He remained in the club for two seasons until Puebla governor Rafael Moreno Valle would give Pardo a preview to play for Atlético Español where he would also achieve Mexican citizenship. He remain in the club for the following few seasons, being part of the runners-up squad for the 1973–74 Mexican Primera División season where the club narrowly lost to Cruz Azul. He would achieve his most significant title in the following season however, being part of the winning squad of the 1975 CONCACAF Champions' Cup after defeating Surinamese club Transvaal.

In 1978, alongside other historic figures of Mexican football such as José Ramón Fernández, Fernando Marcos, Miguel Marín and Ignacio Trelles would all serve as commentators in the TV Azteca broadcast for the 1978 FIFA World Cup final with this trend continuing in 1982 and 1986. Marín and Trelles would also convince Pardo to play in the 1978–79 Cruz Azul season where he was part of the winning squad that season as his only domestic title in Mexican football.
