= Bernardo Hernández (footballer, born 1942) =

Mexican footballer (born 1942)

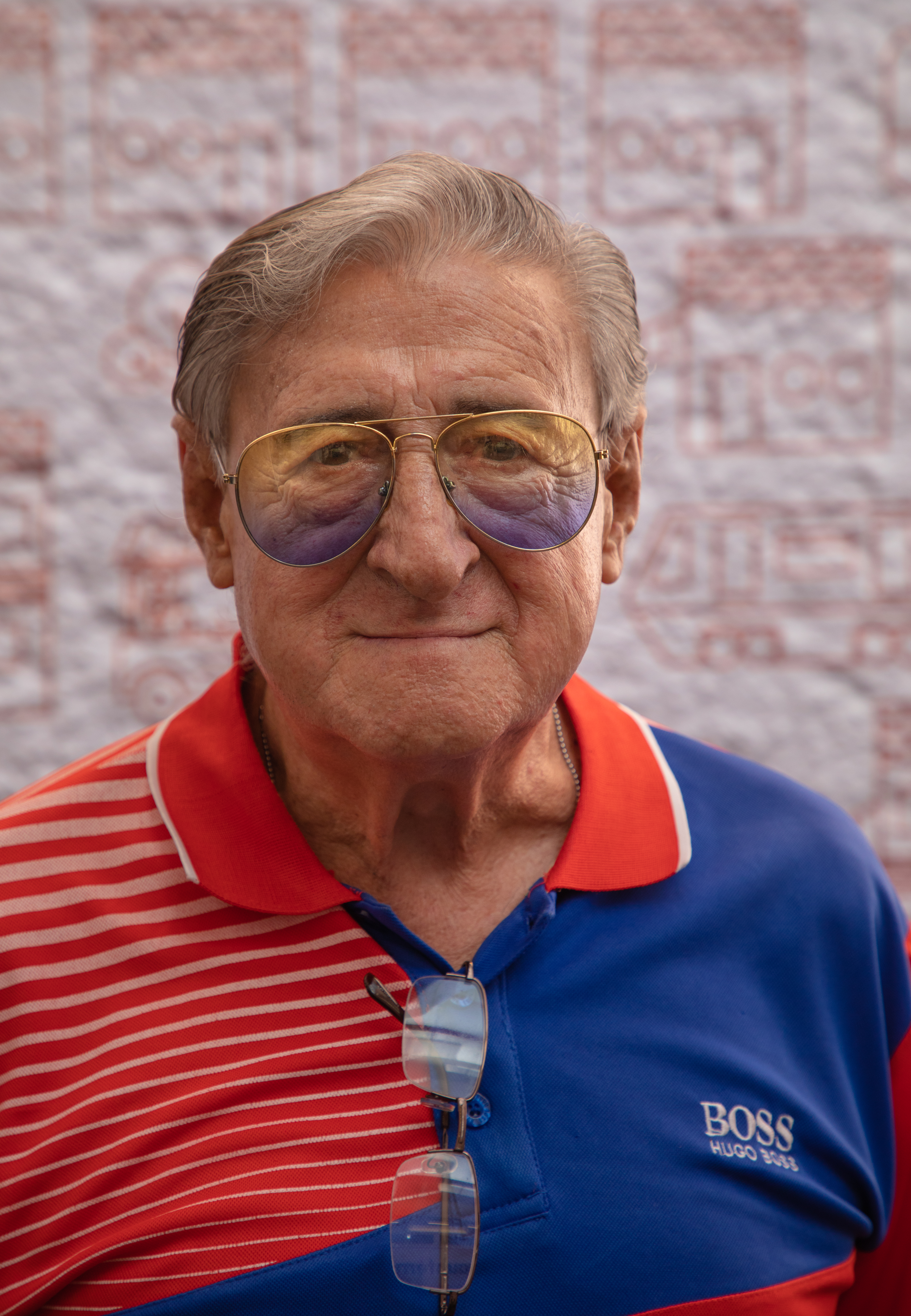
- Portrait of the former soccer player Bernardo "Manolete" Hernández. 2019

Personal information
- Full name: Bernardo Hernández Villaseñor
- Date of birth: 20 August 1942 (age 84)
- Place of birth: Mexico City, Mexico
- Position: Forward

Senior career*
Years	Team	Apps	(Gls)
1961–1973	Atlante		

International career
1967–1968	Mexico	12	(2)
- * Club domestic league appearances and goals

Bernardo Hernández Villaseñor (born 20 August 1942) is a Mexican former professional footballer who competed in the 1968 Summer Olympics.

== Career ==
Hernández played club football for Atlante from 1961 to 1973, and he led the league in goal-scoring during the 1967–68 season.

Hernández made 12 appearances for the senior Mexico national team.
