= Mauro Caballero (Honduran footballer) =

Honduran footballer

Personal information
- Full name: Mauro Irinardo Caballero
- Position: Attacking midfielder

Senior career*
Years	Team	Apps	(Gls)
1965–1978	Marathón		(42)

International career
??	Honduras		
- * Club domestic league appearances and goals

Mauro Irinardo Caballero, known as Nayo, is a Honduran retired football forward who played for C.D. Marathón.

== Club career ==
Nicknamed Nayo, Caballero played his entire career for Marathón. He was member of La Trinca Infernal (The Infernal Lashing) along with his brother Mario Caballero and Julio César Fonseca.

He scored a total of 42 goals for Marathón in Liga Nacional and was the top scorer of 1966-67 season with 12 goals.
