= Vicente Pereda =

Mexican footballer (born 1941)

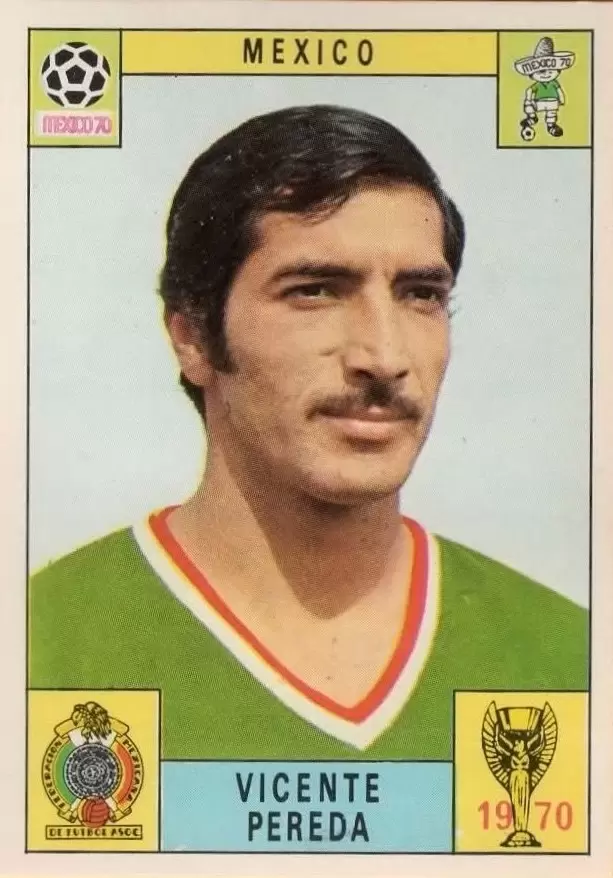
- Pereda in 1970

Personal information
- Full name: Vicente Pereda Mier
- Date of birth: 18 July 1941 (age 85)
- Place of birth: Toluca, State of Mexico, Mexico
- Height: 1.75 m (5 ft 9 in)
- Position: Forward

Senior career*
Years	Team	Apps	(Gls)
1960–1976	Toluca	322	(119)

International career
1963–1970	Mexico	21	(6)
Medal record
Football
Pan American Games
Representing Mexico
Gold medal – first place	1967 Winnipeg	Football
- * Club domestic league appearances and goals

Vicente Pereda Mier (born 18 July 1941) is a Mexican former professional footballer.

Vicente spent his entire career at Toluca FC, winning three Liga MX titles and one CONCACAF Champions Cup title in 1968. He also won two consecutive championships in 1966–67 and 1967–68 under coach Ignacio Trelles and the championship of 1974–75 before his retirement. He was the top scorer of Liga MX in 1969–70. He also is the top ninth score of the history in the club with 119 goals.

== Career ==
Vicente Pereda was born on 18 July 1941 in Toluca, State of Mexico. He began playing youth football for local side River Plate Coyoacán, before joining Deportivo Toluca F.C.'s reserves. He debuted in the Mexican Primera Division with Toluca in 1960, and would score 119 league goals during a 17-year career with the club.

Pereda competed at the 1968 Summer Olympics in Mexico City, where the Mexican team placed fourth.

With the Mexico national football team he played 21 matches scoring 6 goals, but he never managed to attend a World Cup.

== Honours ==
=== Player ===
Toluca

- Mexican Primera División: 1966–67, 1967–68, 1974–75
- Campeón de Campeones: 1966–67, 1967–68
- CONCACAF Champions League: 1968

Individual

- Copa MX Top Scorer: 1966–67
- Pan American Games Top Scorer: 1967
- Mexican Primera División Top Scorer: 1969–70

Mexico

- Pan American Games: 1967
