= C.F. Torreón =

Mexican football club

Torreón
- Full name: Club de Fútbol Torreón, A.C.
- Nickname: Diablos Blancos
- Founded: 1960
- Dissolved: 1970
- Ground: Estadio Corona, Torreón, Coahuila
- Capacity: 18.500
- League: Defunct
Home colours	Away colours

Club de Fútbol Torreón was a Mexican football team that played in the Primera División de México and in the Segunda División de México. It was based in the city of Torreón, Coahuila.

== History ==
Team photo

The club was founded in 1960. It was formed from the old club El Cataluña who played in the Segunda División de México. They played with that name for three years, then changed its name to Torreón.

The club was promoted in the 1968–69 season and coached by the Peruvian Grimaldo González.

The club was moved to Guadalajara, Jalisco after the 1973–74 season and renamed as Club Deportivo Leones Negros de la Universidad de Guadalajara.

== Honors ==
- Runner Up Copa Mexico (1): 1969–1970
- Segunda División Profesional (1): 1968–1969
- Copa Mexico de la Segunda División Profesional (1): 1968–1969
- Runner Up Copa Mexico de la Segunda División Profesional (1): 1953–1954

== See also ==
- Club de Fútbol Laguna
- Santos Laguna
