= 1969 CONCACAF Championship squads =

These are the squads for the countries that played in the 1969 CONCACAF Championship.

The age listed for each player is on 23 November 1969, the first day of the tournament. The numbers of caps and goals listed for each player do not include any matches played after the start of the tournament. The club listed is the club for which the player last played a competitive match before the tournament. The nationality for each club reflects the national association (not the league) to which the club is affiliated. A flag is included for coaches who are of a different nationality than their own national team.

Jamaica (1) and Trinidad and Tobago (2) had players representing foreign clubs.

== Netherlands Antilles ==
Head coach: Guillermo de Haseth

| No. | Pos. | Player | Date of birth (age) | Caps | Club |
|---|---|---|---|---|---|
| 1 | GK | Oswin de Lannoy | | | (Netherlands Antilles) SUBT |
| 2 | GK | Jubert Richardson | 1 January 1942 (aged 27) | | (Netherlands Antilles) Dakota |
| 3 | DF | Erwin Melfor | | | (Netherlands Antilles) Centro Barber |
| 4 | DF | Johan Bodak | | | (Netherlands Antilles) Scherpenheuvel |
| 5 | DF | Juan Maximiliano Pablo | 18 November 1938 (aged 31) | | (Netherlands Antilles) Dakota |
| 6 | DF | Elsio Martina | | | (Netherlands Antilles) Jong Colombia |
| 7 | DF | Elric Martina (captain) | | | (Netherlands Antilles) Jong Colombia |
| 8 | DF | Erwin Bito | | | (Netherlands Antilles) Scherpenheuvel |
| 9 | MF | Edgar Meulens | | | (Netherlands Antilles) Scherpenheuvel |
| 10 | MF | Hubert Braafhart | | | (Netherlands Antilles) Sithoc |
| 11 | MF | Ronald Martis | | | (Netherlands Antilles) Centro Dominguito |
| 12 | MF | Franklin Victoria | | | (Netherlands Antilles) Jong Colombia |
| 13 | MF | Ernesto Wijman | | | (Netherlands Antilles) Vitesse |
| 14 | FW | Wilbert Martijn | | | (Netherlands Antilles) Estrella |
| 15 | FW | Evaristo Rosal | | | (Netherlands Antilles) Jong Holland |
| 16 | FW | Humphrey Seferina | | | (Netherlands Antilles) Sithoc |
| 17 | FW | Adelbert Toppenberg | | | (Netherlands Antilles) SUBT |
| 18 | FW | Carlos Regales | | | (Netherlands Antilles) Deportivo Portugués |
| 19 | FW | Melvyn Loesftok | | | (Netherlands Antilles) Dakota |
| 20 | FW | Ismael Croes | | | (Netherlands Antilles) Estrella |

== Costa Rica ==
Head coach: Marvin Rodríguez

| No. | Pos. | Player | Date of birth (age) | Caps | Club |
|---|---|---|---|---|---|
| 1 | GK | Mario Pérez Rodríguez | 11 April 1936 (aged 33) | | (Costa Rica) Cartaginés |
| 2 | GK | Juan Alberto Gutiérrez | 6 March 1948 (aged 21) | | (Costa Rica) Barrio México |
| 3 | GK | Rodolfo Umaña | 20 November 1940 (aged 29) | | (Costa Rica) Saprissa |
| 4 | DF | Wálter Elizondo (captain) | 4 November 1942 (aged 27) | | (Costa Rica) Saprissa |
| 5 | DF | Fernando Jiménez Sánchez | 3 December 1939 (aged 29) | | (Costa Rica) Cartaginés |
| 6 | DF | Álvaro Grant | 3 February 1938 (aged 31) | | (Costa Rica) Herediano |
| 7 | DF | Luis Fernando Solano | 21 September 1945 (aged 24) | | (Costa Rica) Saprissa |
| 8 | DF | Alfonso Estupiñán | 4 June 1948 (aged 21) | | (Costa Rica) Municipal Puntarenas |
| 9 | DF | Ronald Jackson | 2 September 1947 (aged 22) | | (Costa Rica) Herediano |
| 10 | DF | Heriberto Rojas | 18 June 1943 (aged 26) | | (Costa Rica) Saprissa |
| 11 | MF | Luis Gonzalo Chacón | 5 August 1939 (aged 30) | | (Costa Rica) Saprissa |
| 12 | MF | Eduardo Umaña | 24 March 1945 (aged 24) | | (Costa Rica) Saprissa |
| 13 | MF | Mario Vega Solórzano | 3 November 1943 (aged 26) | | (Costa Rica) Alajuelense |
| 14 | MF | Álvaro Cascante | 19 February 1945 (aged 24) | | (Costa Rica) Cartaginés |
| 15 | MF | Jaime Grant | 29 March 1947 (aged 22) | | (Costa Rica) Saprissa |
| 16 | MF | Wally Vaughns | 29 August 1943 (aged 26) | | (Costa Rica) Cartaginés |
| 17 | FW | Errol Daniels | 17 May 1944 (aged 25) | | (Costa Rica) Cartaginés |
| 18 | FW | Francisco Hernández | 11 July 1949 (aged 20) | | (Costa Rica) Saprissa |
| 19 | FW | Roy Sáenz | 5 December 1944 (aged 24) | | (Costa Rica) Alajuelense |
| 20 | FW | Víctor Manuel Ruiz | 6 December 1945 (aged 23) | | (Costa Rica) Alajuelense |
| 21 | FW | Pecas López | 14 December 1942 (aged 26) | | (Costa Rica) Cartaginés |
| 22 | FW | Vicente Wanchope | 16 July 1946 (aged 23) | | (Costa Rica) Herediano |

== Guatemala ==
Head Coach: (Spain) Lorenzo Ausina Tur

| No. | Pos. | Player | Date of birth (age) | Caps | Club |
|---|---|---|---|---|---|
| 1 | GK | Ignacio González Lam | 2 April 1944 (aged 25) | | (Guatemala) Municipal |
| 2 | GK | Víctor Hugo Guerra | | | (Guatemala) Cementos Novella |
| 3 | GK | Adrián Lorenzo Fernández | 19 September 1943 (aged 26) | | (Guatemala) Tipografía Nacional |
| 4 | DF | Armando Melgar | 25 November 1944 (aged 24) | | (Guatemala) Municipal |
| 5 | DF | Horacio Hasse | 13 July 1945 (aged 24) | | (Guatemala) Municipal |
| 6 | DF | Alberto López Oliva | 10 March 1944 (aged 25) | | (Guatemala) Municipal |
| 7 | DF | Lijón León | 19 April 1943 (aged 26) | | (Guatemala) Aurora |
| 8 | DF | Roberto Ochoa | 17 April 1945 (aged 24) | | (Guatemala) Aurora |
| 9 | DF | René de León | 15 May 1940 (aged 29) | | (Guatemala) Aurora |
| 10 | MF | Hugo Montoya | 7 August 1941 (aged 28) | | (Guatemala) Municipal |
| 11 | MF | Jorge Roldán (captain) | 16 December 1940 (aged 28) | | (Guatemala) Aurora |
| 12 | MF | Rolando Valdez | 22 May 1945 (aged 24) | | (Guatemala) Municipal |
| 13 | MF | Hugo Torres | 9 July 1945 (aged 24) | | (Guatemala) Comunicaciones |
| 14 | MF | Erwin Torres | | | (Guatemala) Comunicaciones |
| 15 | MF | Rafael Rosales | | | (Guatemala) Cementos Novella |
| 16 | FW | Marco Fión | 17 January 1947 (aged 22) | | (Guatemala) Municipal |
| 17 | FW | Julio César Anderson | 27 November 1947 (aged 21) | | (Guatemala) Municipal |
| 18 | FW | Selvin Pennant | 4 January 1950 (aged 19) | | (Guatemala) Tipografía Nacional |
| 19 | FW | Nelson Melgar | 22 July 1945 (aged 24) | | (Guatemala) Comunicaciones |
| 20 | FW | Daniel Salamanca Posadas | 20 January 1939 (aged 30) | | (Guatemala) Municipal |
| 21 | FW | Tomás Gamboa | 11 September 1947 (aged 22) | | (Guatemala) Cementos Novella |
| 22 | FW | Jorge Morales | | | (Guatemala) Xelajú |

== Jamaica ==
Head Coach: George Thompson

| No. | Pos. | Player | Date of birth (age) | Caps | Club |
|---|---|---|---|---|---|
| 1 | GK | Vester Constantine | | | (Jamaica) Regiment |
| 2 | GK | Lloyd Morgan | | | (Jamaica) Boys' Town |
| 3 | DF | Delroy Scott (captain) | 22 January 1947 (aged 22) | | (United States) Atlanta Chiefs |
| 4 | DF | Calvin Stewart | 1946 (aged 22–23) | | (Jamaica) Cavalier |
| 5 | DF | John Simmonds | | | (Jamaica) Regiment |
| 6 | DF | David Bernard | | | (Jamaica) Regiment |
| 7 | DF | Geoffrey Maxwell | 1947 (aged 21–22) | | (Jamaica) Real Mona |
| 8 | DF | Edward Dawkins | | | (Jamaica) Boys' Town |
| 9 | DF | Les Brown | | | (Jamaica) Boys' Town |
| 10 | MF | Arthur Cameron | | | (Jamaica) St. George´s Old Boys |
| 11 | MF | David Largie | | | (Jamaica) Santos |
| 12 | MF | Lloyd Welch | | | (Jamaica) Boys' Town |
| 13 | MF | Joshua Hamilton | | | (Jamaica) Y.M.C.A. |
| 14 | FW | Winston Hill | | | (Jamaica) Boys' Town |
| 15 | FW | Theophilus Branch | | | (Jamaica) Boys' Town |
| 16 | FW | Arthur Kerr | | | (Jamaica) Santos |
| 17 | FW | Arthur Lattimore | | | (Jamaica) Y.M.C.A. |
| 18 | FW | Leonard Mason | | | (Jamaica) Real Mona |
| 19 | FW | Cornel Marshall | | | (Jamaica) St. George´s Old Boys |
| 20 | FW | Roy Welch | | | (Jamaica) Cavalier |

== Mexico ==
Head Coach: Diego Mercado Marín

| No. | Pos. | Player | Date of birth (age) | Caps | Club |
|---|---|---|---|---|---|
| 1 | GK | Federico Ochoa | 13 July 1943 (aged 26) | | (Mexico) Zacatepec |
| 2 | GK | Amado Palacios | 12 February 1941 (aged 28) | | (Mexico) América |
| 3 | GK | Raúl Díaz | | | (Mexico) Ciudad Madero |
| 4 | DF | Héctor Sandoval | 4 June 1939 (aged 30) | | (Mexico) Poza Rica |
| 5 | DF | Severo de Sales (captain) | 28 November 1940 (aged 28) | | (Mexico) América |
| 6 | DF | Javier García Lomelí | 3 January 1943 (aged 26) | | (Mexico) Nuevo León |
| 7 | DF | Jorge Santana | | | (Mexico) Naucalpan |
| 8 | DF | Fernando Zamora | | | (Mexico) Puebla |
| 9 | DF | Jorge Negrete Vea | 23 March 1943 (aged 26) | | (Mexico) Puebla |
| 10 | DF | Alfonso Sabater | | | (Mexico) Puebla |
| 11 | DF | Raúl Muñiz | | | (Mexico) Unión de Curtidores |
| 12 | MF | Guillermo Langarica | 11 January 1943 (aged 26) | | (Mexico) Naucalpan |
| 13 | MF | Leonel Urbina | 25 April 1945 (aged 24) | | (Mexico) Atlético Morelia |
| 14 | MF | Rubén Uribe | | | (Mexico) Zamora |
| 15 | MF | José Rodríguez Sevilla | 28 March 1939 (aged 30) | | (Mexico) Atlas |
| 16 | MF | Pedro Díaz | | | (Mexico) Nacional |
| 17 | FW | José Álvarez Crespo | 10 May 1945 (aged 24) | | (Mexico) Nuevo León |
| 18 | FW | Leopoldo Barba | 11 January 1941 (aged 28) | | (Mexico) Tigres UANL |
| 19 | FW | Refugio Fernández | 23 June 1939 (aged 30) | | (Mexico) Zamora |
| 20 | FW | Francisco Mancilla | | | (Mexico) Zacatepec |
| 21 | FW | Dámaso Pérez | | | (Mexico) Nuevo León |

== Trinidad and Tobago ==
Head coach: Trevor Smith

| No. | Pos. | Player | Date of birth (age) | Caps | Club |
|---|---|---|---|---|---|
| 1 | GK | Gerald Figeroux | 23 May 1943 (aged 26) | | (Trinidad and Tobago) Paragon |
| 2 | GK | Mervyn Crawford | | | (Trinidad and Tobago) Hurricanes |
| 3 | DF | Tyrone de la Bastide (captain) | 18 October 1938 (aged 31) | | (Trinidad and Tobago) Maple |
| 4 | DF | Lawrence Rondon | 4 September 1949 (aged 20) | | (Trinidad and Tobago) Caroní |
| 5 | DF | George Romano | | | (Trinidad and Tobago) Queen's Park |
| 6 | DF | David Arnim | | | (Trinidad and Tobago) Police |
| 7 | DF | Selwyn Murren | 30 November 1944 (aged 24) | | (Trinidad and Tobago) Shell |
| 8 | MF | Bertrand Grell | 22 August 1944 (aged 25) | | (United States) Washington Darts |
| 9 | MF | Leroy DeLeon | 7 February 1948 (aged 21) | | (Trinidad and Tobago) Point Fortin Civic |
| 10 | MF | Everald Cummings | 28 August 1948 (aged 21) | | (United States) Atlanta Chiefs |
| 11 | MF | Kenny Joseph | | | (Trinidad and Tobago) |
| 12 | MF | Max Mascall | | | (Trinidad and Tobago) |
| 13 | MF | Mervyn Springer | | | (Trinidad and Tobago) |
| 14 | FW | Wilfred Cave | 23 May 1948 (aged 21) | | (Trinidad and Tobago) Point Fortin Civic |
| 15 | FW | Leo Brewster | 31 October 1950 (aged 19) | | (Trinidad and Tobago) Point Fortin Civic |
| 16 | FW | Keith Douglas | | | (Trinidad and Tobago) Point Fortin Civic |
| 17 | FW | Ulric Haynes | 12 December 1948 (aged 20) | | (Trinidad and Tobago) Malvern |
| 18 | FW | Gwenwyn Cust | | | (Trinidad and Tobago) |
