= Honduras at the CONCACAF Gold Cup =

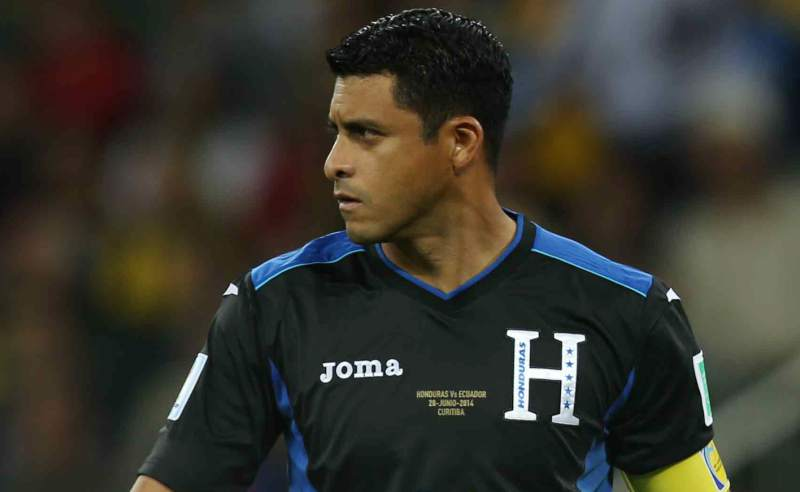
At age 34, Noel Valladares was voted Best Goalkeeper of the 2011 CONCACAF Gold Cup. He was also part of the Honduran squad 13 years earlier, in 1998.

The CONCACAF Gold Cup is North America's major tournament in senior men's football and determines the continental champion. Until 1989, the tournament was known as CONCACAF Championship. It is currently held every two years. From 1996 to 2005, nations from other confederations have regularly joined the tournament as invitees. In earlier editions, the continental championship was held in different countries, but since the inception of the Gold Cup in 1991, the United States are constant hosts or co-hosts.

From 1973 to 1989, the tournament doubled as the confederation's World Cup qualification. CONCACAF's representative team at the FIFA Confederations Cup was decided by a play-off between the winners of the last two tournament editions in 2015 via the CONCACAF Cup, but was then discontinued along with the Confederations Cup.

Since the inaugural tournament in 1963, the Gold Cup was held 28 times and has been won by seven different nations, most often by Mexico (13 titles).

Honduras have won the title once, in 1981, at one of their two home tournaments. They had already been hosts in 1967, where they finished in third place. Ranking fourth on the all-time table, they are one of the most successful teams in the North American Federation. From 2005 to 2013, they reached the semi-finals on four out of five occasions, although they never reached the final during that time. In 1991, Honduras played their only true final, which they lost to the United States after the eighth round of a penalty shoot-out. Before 1991, the tournament was contested in groups rather than knockout matches.

== Overall record ==
CONCACAF Championship & Gold Cup record										Qualification record					
Year	Result	Position	Pld	W	D*	L	GF	GA	Squad	Pld	W	D	L	GF	GA
(El Salvador) 1963	Fourth place	4th	7	3	1	3	8	12	Squad	Qualified automatically					
(Guatemala) 1965	Did not qualify									2	0	0	2	1	5
(Honduras) 1967	Third place	3rd	5	2	2	1	4	2	Squad	Qualified as hosts					
(Costa Rica) 1969	Banned									Banned					
(Trinidad and Tobago) 1971	Sixth place	6th	5	0	1	4	5	11	Squad	2	1	1	0	2	1
(Haiti) 1973	Fourth place	4th	5	1	3	1	6	6	Squad	2	1	1	0	5	4
(Mexico) 1977	Did not enter									Did not enter					
(Honduras) 1981	Champions	1st	5	3	2	0	8	1	Squad	8	5	2	1	15	5
1985	Runners-up	2nd	8	3	3	2	11	9	Squad	2	2	0	0	4	0
1989	Did not qualify									2	0	2	0	1	1
(United States) 1991	Runners-up	2nd	5	3	2	0	12	3	Squad	5	2	1	2	5	5
(Mexico) (United States) 1993	Group stage	5th	3	1	0	2	6	5	Squad	3	3	0	0	7	0
(United States) 1996	Group stage	8th	2	0	0	2	1	8	Squad	4	3	1	0	8	1
(United States) 1998	Group stage	9th	2	0	0	2	1	5	Squad	5	2	1	2	8	5
(United States) 2000	Quarter-finals	6th	3	2	0	1	7	5	Squad	5	4	0	1	11	5
(United States) 2002	Did not qualify									3	1	1	1	12	5
(Mexico) (United States) 2003	Group stage	10th	2	0	1	1	1	2	Squad	7	3	1	3	10	7
(United States) 2005	Semi-finals	3rd	5	3	1	1	8	6	Squad	5	3	2	0	12	3
(United States) 2007	Quarter-finals	5th	4	2	0	2	10	6	Squad	3	1	1	1	11	5
(United States) 2009	Semi-finals	3rd	5	3	0	2	6	4	Squad	5	4	0	1	9	3
(United States) 2011	Semi-finals	4th	5	1	2	2	8	5	Squad	4	3	1	0	8	3
(United States) 2013	Semi-finals	4th	5	3	0	2	5	5	Squad	4	1	2	1	3	3
(Canada) (United States) 2015	Group stage	11th	3	0	1	2	2	4	Squad	4	2	0	2	3	3
(United States) 2017	Quarter-finals	7th	4	1	1	2	3	2	Squad	5	4	1	0	7	3
(Costa Rica) (Jamaica) (United States) 2019	Group stage	10th	3	1	0	2	6	4	Squad	Qualified automatically					
(United States) 2021	Quarter-finals	8th	4	2	0	2	7	7	Squad	4	3	1	0	8	1
(Canada) (United States) 2023	Group stage	10th	3	1	1	1	3	6	Squad	4	2	0	2	5	7
(Canada) (United States) 2025	Semi-finals	4th	5	2	1	2	5	9	Squad	8	5	1	2	17	11
Total	1 Title	23/28	98	37	22	39	133	127	—	96	55	20	21	172	86

=== Match overview ===
Tournament	Round	Opponent	Score	Venue
(El Salvador) 1963	Group stage	Guatemala	2–1	San Salvador
(El Salvador) 1963	Group stage	Panama	1–0	San Salvador
(El Salvador) 1963	Group stage	Nicaragua	1–0	San Salvador
(El Salvador) 1963	Group stage	El Salvador	2–2	San Salvador
(El Salvador) 1963	Final round	El Salvador	0–3	San Salvador
(El Salvador) 1963	Final round	Costa Rica	1–2	San Salvador
(El Salvador) 1963	Final round	Netherlands Antilles	1–4	San Salvador
(Honduras) 1967	Final round	Trinidad and Tobago	1–0	Tegucigalpa
(Honduras) 1967	Final round	Nicaragua	1–1	Tegucigalpa
(Honduras) 1967	Final round	Guatemala	0–0	Tegucigalpa
(Honduras) 1967	Final round	Haiti	2–0	Tegucigalpa
(Honduras) 1967	Final round	Mexico	0–1	Tegucigalpa
(Trinidad and Tobago) 1971	Final round	Trinidad and Tobago	1–1	Port of Spain
(Trinidad and Tobago) 1971	Final round	Cuba	1–3	Port of Spain
(Trinidad and Tobago) 1971	Final round	Costa Rica	1–2	Port of Spain
(Trinidad and Tobago) 1971	Final round	Haiti	1–3	Port of Spain
(Trinidad and Tobago) 1971	Final round	Mexico	1–2	Port of Spain
(Haiti) 1973	Final round	Trinidad and Tobago	2–1	Port-au-Prince
(Haiti) 1973	Final round	Mexico	1–1	Port-au-Prince
(Haiti) 1973	Final round	Haiti	0–1	Port-au-Prince
(Haiti) 1973	Final round	Netherlands Antilles	2–2	Port-au-Prince
(Haiti) 1973	Final round	Guatemala	1–1	Port-au-Prince
(Honduras) 1981	Final round	Haiti	4–0	Tegucigalpa
(Honduras) 1981	Final round	Cuba	2–0	Tegucigalpa
(Honduras) 1981	Final round	Canada	2–1	Tegucigalpa
(Honduras) 1981	Final round	El Salvador	0–0	Tegucigalpa
(Honduras) 1981	Final round	Mexico	0–0	Tegucigalpa
1985	Group stage	Suriname	1–1	Tegucigalpa, Honduras
1985	Group stage	Suriname	2–1	Tegucigalpa, Honduras
1985	Group stage	El Salvador	2–1	San Salvador, El Salvador
1985	Group stage	El Salvador	0–0	Tegucigalpa, Honduras
1985	Final round	Costa Rica	2–2	San José, Costa Rica
1985	Final round	Canada	0–1	Tegucigalpa, Honduras
1985	Final round	Costa Rica	3–1	Tegucigalpa, Honduras
1985	Final round	Canada	1–2	St. John's, Canada
(United States) 1991	Group stage	Canada	4–2	Los Angeles
(United States) 1991	Group stage	Jamaica	5–0	Los Angeles
(United States) 1991	Group stage	Mexico	1–1	Los Angeles
(United States) 1991	Semi-Finals	Costa Rica	2–0	Los Angeles
(United States) 1991	Final	United States	0–0 (3–4 p)	Los Angeles
(Mexico) (United States) 1993	Group stage	Panama	5–1	Dallas
(Mexico) (United States) 1993	Group stage	Jamaica	1–3	Dallas
(Mexico) (United States) 1993	Group stage	United States	0–1	Dallas
(United States) 1996	Group stage	Canada	1–3	Anaheim
(United States) 1996	Group stage	Brazil	0–5	Los Angeles
(United States) 1998	Group stage	Trinidad and Tobago	1–3	Oakland
(United States) 1998	Group stage	Mexico	0–2	Oakland
(United States) 2000	Group stage	Jamaica	2–0	Miami
(United States) 2000	Group stage	Colombia	2–0	Miami
(United States) 2000	Quarter-finals	Peru	3–5	Miami
(United States) (Mexico) 2003	Group stage	Brazil	1–2	Mexico City
(United States) (Mexico) 2003	Group stage	Mexico	0–0	Mexico City
(United States) 2005	Group stage	Trinidad and Tobago	1–1	Miami
(United States) 2005	Group stage	Colombia	2–1	Miami
(United States) 2005	Group stage	Panama	1–0	Miami
(United States) 2005	Quarter-finals	Costa Rica	3–2	Foxborough
(United States) 2005	Semi-finals	United States	1–2	East Rutherford
(United States) 2007	Group stage	Panama	2–3	East Rutherford
(United States) 2007	Group stage	Mexico	2–1	East Rutherford
(United States) 2007	Group stage	Cuba	5–0	Houston
(United States) 2007	Quarter-finals	Guadeloupe	1–2	Houston
(United States) 2009	Group stage	Haiti	1–0	Seattle
(United States) 2009	Group stage	United States	0–2	Washington, D.C.
(United States) 2009	Group stage	Grenada	4–0	Foxborough
(United States) 2009	Quarter-finals	Canada	1–0	Philadelphia
(United States) 2009	Semi-finals	United States	0–2	Chicago
(United States) 2011	Group stage	Guatemala	0–0	Carson
(United States) 2011	Group stage	Grenada	7–1	Miami
(United States) 2011	Group stage	Jamaica	0–1	Harrison
(United States) 2011	Quarter-finals	Costa Rica	1–1 (4–2 p)	East Rutherford
(United States) 2011	Semi-finals	Mexico	0–2 (a.e.t.)	Houston
(United States) 2013	Group stage	Haiti	2–0	Harrison
(United States) 2013	Group stage	El Salvador	1–0	Miami Gardens
(United States) 2013	Group stage	Trinidad and Tobago	0–2	Houston
(United States) 2013	Quarter-finals	Costa Rica	1–0	Baltimore
(United States) 2013	Semi-finals	United States	1–3	Arlington
(United States) (Canada) 2015	Group stage	United States	1–2	Frisco
(United States) (Canada) 2015	Group stage	Panama	1–1	Foxborough
(United States) (Canada) 2015	Group stage	Haiti	0–1	Kansas City
(United States) 2017	Group stage	Costa Rica	0–1	Harrison
(United States) 2017	Group stage	French Guiana	3–0 (Awarded) (Note: CONCACAF awarded Honduras a 3–0 win as a result of French Guiana fielding the ineligible player Florent Malouda, after the match had finished 0–0. Malouda had previously represented France and did not meet eligibility rules.)	Houston
(United States) 2017	Group stage	Canada	0–0	Frisco
(United States) 2017	Quarter-finals	Mexico	0–1	Glendale
(United States) (Costa Rica) (Jamaica) 2019	Group stage	Jamaica	2–3	Kingston
(United States) (Costa Rica) (Jamaica) 2019	Group stage	Curaçao	0–1	Houston
(United States) (Costa Rica) (Jamaica) 2019	Group stage	El Salvador	4–0	Los Angeles
(United States) 2021	Group stage	Grenada	4–0	Houston
(United States) 2021	Group stage	Panama	3–2	Houston
(United States) 2021	Group stage	Qatar	0–2	Houston
(United States) 2021	Quarter-finals	Mexico	0–3	Glendale
(United States) (Canada) 2023	Group stage	Mexico	0–4	Houston
(United States) (Canada) 2023	Group stage	Qatar	1–1	Glendale
(United States) (Canada) 2023	Group stage	Haiti	2–1	Charlotte
(United States) (Canada) 2025	Group stage	Canada	0–6	Vancouver
(United States) (Canada) 2025	Group stage	El Salvador	2–0	Houston
(United States) (Canada) 2025	Group stage	Curaçao	2–1	San Jose
(United States) (Canada) 2025	Quarter-finals	Panama	1–1 (5–4 p)	Glendale
(United States) (Canada) 2025	Semi-finals	Mexico	0–1	Santa Clara

=== Record by opponent ===
CONCACAF Championship/Gold Cup matches (by team)
Opponent	W	D	L	Pld	GF	GA
Brazil	0	0	2	2	1	7
Canada	3	1	4	8	9	15
Colombia	2	0	0	2	4	1
Costa Rica	4	2	3	9	14	11
Cuba	2	0	1	3	8	3
El Salvador	4	3	1	8	11	6
French Guiana	1	0	0	1	3	0
Grenada	3	0	0	3	15	1
Guadeloupe	0	0	1	1	1	2
Guatemala	1	3	0	4	3	2
Haiti	5	0	3	8	12	6
Jamaica	2	0	3	5	10	7
Mexico	1	4	8	13	5	19
Netherlands Antilles / Curaçao	1	1	2	4	5	8
Nicaragua	1	1	0	2	2	1
Panama	4	2	1	7	14	8
Peru	0	0	1	1	3	5
Qatar	0	1	1	2	1	3
Suriname	1	1	0	2	3	2
Trinidad and Tobago	2	2	2	6	6	8
United States	0	1	6	7	3	12

== 1981 CONCACAF Championship ==
At their home tournament in 1981, Honduras started off with three victories over Haiti, Cuba and Canada. The other matches also went in favour of the hosts: Title holder Mexico lost 0–1 to El Salvador, El Salvador lost 0–1 to Canada, and Canada in turn only drew against both Mexico and Haiti. The table situation allowed Honduras to secure the title on the fourth of five match days, by drawing 0–0 against El Salvador.

The last match against Mexico challenged Honduras to stay unbeaten. It was also a chance to showcase their football to the region, which largely would have favoured a Mexican triumph. The match plan was to prioritize defense, which led to few chances on both sides. They succeeded in staying unbeaten by drawing 0–0, eliminating Mexico from the World Cup qualifiers in the process.

=== Final table ===
Rank	Team	Pts	Pld	W	D	L	GF	GA	GD
1	Honduras	8	5	3	2	0	8	1	+7
2	El Salvador	6	5	2	2	1	2	1	+1
3	Mexico	5	5	1	3	1	6	3	+3
4	Canada	5	5	1	3	1	6	6	0
5	Cuba	4	5	1	2	2	4	8	−4
6	Haiti	2	5	0	2	3	2	9	−7

Honduras and El Salvador qualified for the 1982 FIFA World Cup.

=== Squad ===
The following players were active members of the champion squad:

Head coach: (Honduras) Chelato Uclés

No.	Pos.	Player	Date of birth (age)	Caps	Goals	Club
	GK	Julio César Arzú	5 June 1954 (aged 27)			(Honduras) Real España
	DF	Fernando Bulnes	21 October 1946 (aged 35)			(Honduras) Olimpia
	DF	Anthony Costly	13 December 1954 (aged 26)			(Honduras) Real España
	DF	Hernán García Martínez	8 October 1956 (aged 25)			(Honduras) Marathón
	DF	Efraín Gutiérrez	7 May 1954 (aged 27)			(Honduras) Pumas UNAH
	DF	Jaime Villegas	5 July 1950 (aged 31)			(Honduras) Real España
	DF	Héctor Zelaya	12 August 1958 (aged 23)			(Honduras) Motagua
	MF	Salvador Bernárdez	6 January 1954 (aged 27)			(Honduras) Motagua
	MF	David Bueso	5 May 1955 (aged 26)			(Honduras) Motagua
	MF	Carlos Caballero	5 December 1958 (aged 22)			(Honduras) Real España
	MF	Juan Cruz	27 February 1959 (aged 22)			(Honduras) Pumas UNAH
	MF	Ramón Maradiaga	30 October 1954 (aged 27)			(Honduras) Motagua
	MF	Francisco Javier Toledo	30 September 1959 (aged 22)			(Honduras) Marathón
	FW	Roberto Bailey	10 August 1952 (aged 29)			(Honduras) Marathón
	FW	Junior Costly Rashford				
	FW	Roberto Figueroa	14 November 1959 (aged 21)			(Honduras) Vida
	FW	Eduardo Laing	27 December 1958 (aged 22)			(Honduras) Platense
	FW	Jorge Urquía	1948			(Honduras) Olimpia

== Individual records ==
The following Honduran players have won individual awards at CONCACAF Championships/Gold Cups:

- Roberto Figueroa: 1985 Top Scorer (5 goals)
- Wilmer Velásquez: 2005 (Shared) Top Scorer (3 goals)
- Carlos Pavón: 2007 Top Scorer (5 goals)
- Noel Valladares: 2011 Best Goalkeeper

== See also ==
- Honduras at the Copa América
- Honduras at the FIFA World Cup
