= CONCACAF Gold Cup records and statistics =

This is a list of records and statistics of the CONCACAF Gold Cup, which was the direct successor of the CONCACAF Championship (1963–1989). Before the founding of CONCACAF in 1961 due to the merger of NAFC and CCCF, football in North America, Central America and the Caribbean was divided into two regional confederations, each with its own top tournament for senior national teams, the NAFC Championship for North America and the CCCF Championship for Central America and the Caribbean.

== General statistics by tournament ==
CONCACAF Championship (1963–1989)
Edition	Hosts	Champions	Winning coach	Top scorer(s) (goals)
1963	El Salvador	Costa Rica (1)	(Costa Rica) Alfredo Piedra	(El Salvador) Eduardo Hernández (6)
1965	Guatemala	Mexico (1)	(Mexico) Ignacio Trelles	(Mexico) Ernesto Cisneros (5)
1967	Honduras	Guatemala (1)	(Uruguay) Rubén Amorín	(Mexico) Luis Estrada (4) (Guatemala) Manuel Recinos (4)
1969	Costa Rica	Costa Rica (2)	(Costa Rica) Marvin Rodríguez	(Guatemala) Nelson Melgar (3) (Guatemala) Marco Fión (3) (Costa Rica) Víctor Ruiz (3)
1971	Trinidad and Tobago	Mexico (2)	(Mexico) Javier de la Torre	Unknown
1973	Haiti	Haiti (1)	(Haiti) Antoine Tassy	(Trinidad and Tobago) Steve David (7)
1977	Mexico	Mexico (3)	(Mexico) José Antonio Roca	(Mexico) Víctor Rangel (6)
1981	Honduras	Honduras (1)	(Honduras) Chelato Uclés	(Mexico) Hugo Sánchez (3)
1985	No host	Canada (1)	(England) Tony Waiters	(Honduras) Roberto Figueroa (5)
1989	No host	Costa Rica (3)	(Costa Rica) Marvin Rodríguez	Eight players (2)

CONCACAF Gold Cup (1991–present)
Edition	Hosts	Champions	Winning coach	Top scorer(s) (goals)	Best player award	Young player award
1991	United States	United States (1)	(Socialist Federal Republic of Yugoslavia) Bora Milutinović	(Mexico) Benjamín Galindo (4)	(United States) Tony Meola	Not awarded
1993	United States; Mexico	Mexico (1)	(Mexico) Miguel Mejía Barón	(Mexico) Zaguinho (11)	(Mexico) Ramón Ramírez	Not awarded
1996	United States	Mexico (2)	(Federal Republic of Yugoslavia) Bora Milutinović	(United States) Eric Wynalda (4)	(Mexico) Raúl Lara	Not awarded
1998	United States	Mexico (3)	(Mexico) Manuel Lapuente	(Costa Rica) Paulo Wanchope (4) (Mexico) Luis Hernández (4)	(United States) Kasey Keller	Not awarded
2000	United States	Canada (1)	(Germany) Holger Osieck	(Canada) Carlo Corazzin (4)	(Canada) Craig Forrest	Not awarded
2002	United States	United States (2)	(United States) Bruce Arena	(United States) Brian McBride (4)	(United States) Brian McBride	Not awarded
2003	United States; Mexico	Mexico (4)	(Argentina) Ricardo La Volpe	(Costa Rica) Walter Centeno (4) (United States) Landon Donovan (4)	(Mexico) Jesús Arellano	Not awarded
2005	United States	United States (3)	(United States) Bruce Arena	(Guatemala) Carlos Ruiz (3) (Honduras) Wilmer Velásquez (3) (Panama) Luis Tejada (3) (United States) DaMarcus Beasley (3) (United States) Landon Donovan (3)	(Panama) Luis Tejada	Not awarded
2007	United States	United States (4)	(United States) Bob Bradley	(Honduras) Carlos Pavón (5)	(Canada) Julian de Guzman	Not awarded
2009	United States	Mexico (5)	(Mexico) Javier Aguirre	(Mexico) Miguel Sabah (4)	(Mexico) Giovani dos Santos	Not awarded
2011	United States	Mexico (6)	(Mexico) José Manuel de la Torre	(Mexico) Javier Hernández (7)	(Mexico) Javier Hernández	Not awarded
2013	United States	United States (5)	(Germany) Jürgen Klinsmann	(Panama) Gabriel Torres (5) (United States) Landon Donovan (5) (United States) Chris Wondolowski (5)	(United States) Landon Donovan	Not awarded
2015	United States; Canada	Mexico (7)	(Mexico) Miguel Herrera	(United States) Clint Dempsey (7)	(Mexico) Andrés Guardado	(Mexico) Jesús Corona
2017	United States	United States (6)	(United States) Bruce Arena	(Canada) Alphonso Davies (3) (Martinique) Kévin Parsemain (3) (United States) Jordan Morris (3)	(United States) Michael Bradley	(Canada) Alphonso Davies
2019	United States; Costa Rica; Jamaica	Mexico (8)	(Argentina) Gerardo Martino	(Canada) Jonathan David (6)	(Mexico) Raúl Jiménez	(United States) Christian Pulisic
2021	United States	United States (7)	(United States) Gregg Berhalter	(Qatar) Almoez Ali (4)	(Mexico) Héctor Herrera	(Canada) Tajon Buchanan
2023	United States; Canada	Mexico (9)	(Mexico) Jaime Lozano	(United States) Jesús Ferreira (7)	(Panama) Adalberto Carrasquilla	Not awarded
2025	United States; Canada	Mexico (10)	(Mexico) Javier Aguirre	(Panama) Ismael Díaz (6)	(Mexico) Edson Álvarez	(Guatemala) Olger Escobar

== Debut of teams ==
Does not include guest teams.

Year	Debuting teams			Successor teams
Year	Teams	No.	Cum.	Successor teams
1963	Costa Rica, El Salvador, Guatemala, Honduras, Jamaica, Mexico, Nicaragua, Netherlands Antilles, Panama	9	9	
1965	Haiti	1	10	
1967	Trinidad and Tobago	1	11	
1969	None	0	11	
1971	Cuba	1	12	
1973	None	0	12	
1977	Canada, Suriname	2	14	
1981	None	0	14	
1985	United States	1	15	
1989	None	0	15	
1991	None	0	15	
1993	Martinique	1	16	
1996	Saint Vincent and the Grenadines	1	17	
1998	None	0	17	
2000	None	0	17	
2002	None	0	17	
2003	None	0	17	
2005	None	0	17	
2007	Guadeloupe	1	18	
2009	Grenada	1	19	
2011	None	0	19	
2013	Belize	1	20	
2015	None	0	20	
2017	French Guiana	1	21	Curaçao^{1}
2019	Bermuda, Guyana	2	23	
2021	None	0	23	
2023	Saint Kitts and Nevis	1	24	
2025	Dominican Republic	1	25	
2027	Saint Lucia	1	26	

Notes

1. Debut as Curaçao, the successor national team of Netherlands Antilles.

== Overall team records ==
In this ranking 3 points are awarded for a win, 1 for a draw and 0 for a loss. As per statistical convention in football, matches decided in extra time are counted as wins and losses, while matches decided by penalty shoot-outs are counted as draws. Teams are ranked by total points, then by goal difference, then by goals scored.

As of 2025 CONCACAF Gold Cup

Rank	Team	Part	Pld	W	D	L	GF	GA	GD	Pts
1	Mexico	26	129	90	22	17	281	76	+205	292
2	United States	20	108	79	17	12	212	72	+140	254
3	Costa Rica	23	108	47	31	30	175	115	+60	172
4	Honduras	23	98	37	22	39	133	127	+6	133
5	Canada	20	80	32	25	23	116	95	+21	121
6	Guatemala	21	81	23	23	35	93	103	–10	92
7	Panama	13	59	22	21	16	97	71	+26	87
8	El Salvador	20	77	22	21	34	81	111	–30	87
9	Jamaica	16	66	24	11	31	75	105	–30	83
10	Haiti	17	67	20	13	34	65	96	–31	73
11	Trinidad and Tobago	19	71	18	19	34	82	125	–43	73
12	Curaçao (Note: Includes results of Netherlands Antilles between 1963–1973)	7	33	8	8	17	35	68	–33	32
13	Brazil (Note: Guest nation)	3	14	8	2	4	22	9	+13	26
14	Cuba	12	40	5	6	29	30	121	–91	21
15	Colombia	3	13	5	2	6	14	17	−3	17
16	Guadeloupe	6	21	5	2	14	28	41	–13	17
17	Martinique	8	23	5	2	16	26	58	–32	17
18	Qatar	2	9	4	2	3	15	13	+2	14
19	South Africa	1	4	1	3	0	7	6	+1	6
20	Suriname	4	15	1	2	12	14	37	–23	5
21	Peru	1	4	1	1	2	7	7	0	4
22	Saudi Arabia	1	4	1	1	2	2	4	−2	4
23	South Korea	2	7	0	4	3	5	9	−4	4
24	Bermuda	1	3	1	0	2	4	4	0	3
25	Ecuador	1	2	1	0	1	2	2	0	3
26	Dominican Republic	1	3	0	1	2	3	5	−2	1
27	Guyana	1	3	0	1	2	3	9	−6	1
28	Nicaragua	5	18	0	1	17	6	50	–44	1
29	French Guiana	1	3	0	0	3	2	10	−8	0
30	Saint Vincent and the Grenadines	1	2	0	0	2	0	8	−8	0
31	Belize	1	3	0	0	3	1	11	−10	0
32	Saint Kitts and Nevis	1	3	0	0	3	0	14	−14	0
33	Grenada	3	9	0	0	9	2	36	−34	0
34	Saint Lucia	1	0	0	0	0	0	0	0	0

== Medal table ==
Rank	Nation	Gold	Silver	Bronze	Total
1	Mexico	13	3	3	19
2	United States	7	6	2	15
3	Costa Rica	3	1	4	8
4	Canada	2	0	1	3
5	Honduras	1	2	1	4
6	Guatemala	1	2	0	3
6	Haiti	1	2	0	3
8	Panama	0	3	1	4
9	Brazil	0	2	1	3
9	El Salvador	0	2	1	3
9	Jamaica	0	2	1	3
12	Colombia	0	1	1	2
12	Trinidad and Tobago	0	1	1	2
14	Netherlands Antilles	0	0	2	2
Totals (14 entries)		28	27	19	74

== Comprehensive team results by tournament ==
Legend

- 1st – Champions
- 2nd – Runners-up
- 3rd – Third place
- 4th – Fourth place
- SF – Semi-finals
- QF – Quarter-finals
- GS – Group stage
- Q – Qualified for upcoming tournament
- • – Did not qualify
- † – Disqualified
- × – Did not enter / Withdrew / Banned
- – Hosts

For each tournament, the number of teams in each finals tournament are shown (in parentheses).

Team (26)	1963 (El Salvador) (9)	1965 (Guatemala) (6)	1967 (Honduras) (6)	1969 (Costa Rica) (6)	1971 (Trinidad and Tobago) (6)	1973 (Haiti) (6)	1977 (Mexico) (6)	1981 (Honduras) (6)	1985 (9)	1989 (5)	1991 (United States) (8)	1993 (United States) (Mexico) (8)	1996 (United States) (9)	1998 (United States) (10)	2000 (United States) (12)	2002 (United States) (12)	2003 (United States) (Mexico) (12)	2005 (United States) (12)	2007 (United States) (12)	2009 (United States) (12)	2011 (United States) (12)	2013 (United States) (12)	2015 (United States) (Canada) (12)	2017 (United States) (12)	2019 (United States) (Costa Rica) (Jamaica) (16)	2021 (United States) (16)	2023 (United States) (Canada) (16)	2025 (United States) (Canada) (16)	2027 (16)	Times entered	Times qualified
Belize	Part of United Kingdom								(Note: Not a CONCACAF member)	×	×	×	•	•	•	•	×	•	•	•	•	GS	•	•	•	•	•	•	•	17	1
Bermuda	×	×	×	•	•	×	×	×	×	×	×	×	×	•	•	×	×	•	•	•	×	•	×	•	GS	•	•	•	•	14	1
Canada	×	×	×	×	×	•	4th	4th	1st	•	GS	GS	GS	×	1st	3rd	GS	GS	SF	QF	GS	GS	GS	QF	QF	SF	QF	QF	Q	23	21
Costa Rica	1st	3rd	×	1st	3rd	•	•	•	3rd	1st	4th	3rd	•	GS	QF	2nd	4th	QF	QF	SF	QF	QF	QF	SF	QF	QF	QF	QF		28	23
Cuba	×	×	•	×	4th	×	•	GS	×	•	×	×	•	GS	•	GS	QF	GS	GS	×	GS	QF	QF	•	GS	•	GS	•	Q	21	13
Curaçao/Netherlands Antilles (Note: Includes four appearances as Netherlands Antilles)	3rd	GS	•	3rd	×	GS	•	•	•	•	•	×	×	•	•	×	•	×	•	•	•	•	•	GS	QF	†	•	GS		24	7
Dominican Republic	×	×	×	×	×	×	•	×	×	×	•	•	•	×	•	•	•	×	×	×	•	•	•	•	•	•	•	GS		16	1
El Salvador	2nd	4th	×	×	×	•	3rd	2nd	4th	GS	•	•	GS	GS	•	QF	QF	•	GS	GS	QF	QF	GS	QF	GS	QF	GS	GS		26	20
French Guiana	×	×	×	×	×	×	×	×	×	×	•	•	•	•	•	×	×	•	×	×	×	•	•	GS	•	•	•	•		14	1
Grenada	Part of United Kingdom						×	•	×	×	×	•	•	•	•	•	•	•	•	GS	GS	•	•	•	•	GS	•	•	•	19	3
Guadeloupe	×	×	×	×	×	×	×	×	×	×	•	•	•	×	•	•	•	•	SF	QF	GS	•	•	•	•	GS	GS	GS	•	18	6
Guatemala	GS	2nd	1st	2nd	•	GS	GS	•	GS	4th	GS	×	4th	GS	GS	GS	GS	GS	QF	•	QF	•	GS	†	†	GS	QF	SF		28	21
Guyana	×	×	×	×	×	×	×	×	×	×	•	•	•	×	•	•	•	×	•	•	•	•	•	•	GS	•	•	•	Q	17	2
Haiti	•	GS	GS	†	2nd	1st	2nd	GS	GS	×	•	×	•	×	GS	QF	•	•	GS	QF	•	GS	QF	•	SF	GS	GS	GS		26	17
Honduras	4th	•	3rd	•	GS	4th	•	1st	2nd	•	2nd	GS	GS	GS	QF	•	GS	SF	QF	SF	SF	SF	GS	QF	GS	QF	GS	SF		29	23
Jamaica	GS	×	•	GS	•	×	×	×	×	•	GS	3rd	•	4th	GS	•	QF	QF	•	GS	QF	•	2nd	2nd	SF	QF	SF	GS		24	16
Martinique	Not a CONCACAF member										•	GS	•	•	•	QF	GS	•	•	•	•	GS	•	GS	GS	GS	GS	•	•	19	8
Mexico	GS	1st	2nd	4th	1st	3rd	1st	3rd	×	×	3rd	1st	1st	1st	QF	QF	1st	QF	2nd	1st	1st	SF	1st	SF	1st	2nd	1st	1st	Q	27	27
Nicaragua	GS	•	GS	×	•	•	×	×	×	×	•	•	•	•	•	•	•	•	•	GS	•	•	•	GS	GS	•	†	•		24	5
Panama	GS	×	•	•	×	×	•	•	•	•	•	GS	•	•	×	•	•	2nd	QF	QF	SF	2nd	3rd	QF	QF	GS	2nd	QF	Q	25	14
Saint Kitts and Nevis	Part of United Kingdom								×	×	•	•	•	•	•	•	•	•	•	•	•	•	•	•	•	•	GS	•	•	19	1
Saint Lucia	×	×	×	×	×	×	×	×	×	×	•	•	•	•	•	•	•	•	•	×	•	•	•	•	•	•	•	•	Q	18	1
Saint Vincent and the Grenadines	Not a CONCACAF member									×	×	•	GS	•	•	•	×	•	•	•	•	•	•	•	•	•	•	•	Q	17	2
Suriname	×	×	×	×	×	•	GS	•	GS	×	•	×	•	×	•	•	×	•	•	•	•	•	•	•	•	GS	•	GS		20	4
Trinidad and Tobago	×	×	4th	GS	GS	2nd	•	•	GS	3rd	GS	•	GS	GS	SF	GS	•	GS	GS	•	•	QF	QF	•	GS	GS	GS	GS		27	19
United States	×	×	×	•	×	•	•	•	GS	2nd	1st	2nd	3rd	2nd	QF	1st	3rd	1st	1st	2nd	2nd	1st	4th	1st	2nd	1st	SF	2nd	Q	25	21
Team (26)	1963 (El Salvador) (9)	1965 (Guatemala) (6)	1967 (Honduras) (6)	1969 (Costa Rica) (6)	1971 (Trinidad and Tobago) (6)	1973 (Haiti) (6)	1977 (Mexico) (6)	1981 (Honduras) (6)	1985 (9)	1989 (5)	1991 (United States) (8)	1993 (United States) (Mexico) (8)	1996 (United States) (9)	1998 (United States) (10)	2000 (United States) (12)	2002 (United States) (12)	2003 (United States) (Mexico) (12)	2005 (United States) (12)	2007 (United States) (12)	2009 (United States) (12)	2011 (United States) (12)	2013 (United States) (12)	2015 (United States) (Canada) (12)	2017 (United States) (12)	2019 (United States) (Costa Rica) (Jamaica) (16)	2021 (United States) (16)	2023 (United States) (Canada) (16)	2025 (United States) (Canada) (16)	2027 (16)	Times entered	Times qualified

== Guest team records ==
Team	1991 (United States)	1993 (United States) (Mexico)	1996 (United States)	1998 (United States)	2000 (United States)	2002 (United States)	2003 (United States) (Mexico)	2005 (United States)	2007 (United States)	2009 (United States)	2011 (United States)	2013 (United States)	2015 (United States) (Canada)	2017 (United States)	2019 (United States) (Costa Rica) (Jamaica)	2021 (United States)	2023 (United States) (Canada)	2025 (United States) (Canada)	2027	Editions
Brazil			2nd	3rd			2nd													3
Colombia					2nd		QF	SF												3
Ecuador						GS														1
Peru					SF															1
Qatar																SF	QF			2
Saudi Arabia																		QF	Q	2
South Africa								QF												1
South Korea					GS	4th														2

== Teams yet to qualify for finals ==
The following fifteen teams which are current CONCACAF members have never qualified for the Gold Cup.

Legend

- • – Did not qualify
- × – Did not enter / withdrew / banned

For each tournament, the number of teams in each finals tournament (in brackets) are shown.

Team (15)	1963 (9)	1965 (6)	1967 (6)	1969 (6)	1971 (6)	1973 (6)	1977 (6)	1981 (6)	1985 (9)	1989 (5)	1991 (8)	1993 (8)	1996 (9)	1998 (10)	2000 (12)	2002 (12)	2003 (12)	2005 (12)	2007 (12)	2009 (12)	2011 (12)	2013 (12)	2015 (12)	2017 (12)	2019 (16)	2021 (16)	2023 (16)	2025 (16)	2027 (16)	Attempts
Anguilla	×	×	×	×	×	×	×	×	×	×	•	•	•	•	•	•	×	×	•	•	•	•	•	•	•	•	•	•	•	17
Antigua and Barbuda	Part of United Kingdom					•	×	×	•	•	×	•	•	•	•	•	•	•	•	•	•	•	•	•	•	•	•	•	•	21
Aruba	Part of Netherlands Antilles									×	×	×	•	•	•	•	•	×	×	•	×	•	•	•	•	•	•	•		14
Bahamas	Part of United Kingdom						×	×	×	×	×	×	×	×	•	×	×	×	•	×	×	×	×	×	•	•	•	•	•	7
Barbados	×	×	×	×	×	×	•	×	×	×	×	•	•	•	•	•	•	•	•	•	•	•	•	•	•	•	•	•	•	19
Bonaire	Part of Netherlands Antilles																						•	×	•	•	•	•	•	6
British Virgin Islands	Not a CONCACAF member									×	•	•	×	•	•	•	•	•	×	•	•	•	•	•	•	•	•	•	•	17
Cayman Islands	Not a CONCACAF member									×	•	•	•	×	•	•	•	•	•	•	•	×	×	×	•	•	•	•	•	15
Dominica	×	×	×	×	×	×	×	×	×	×	×	•	•	•	•	•	×	•	•	•	•	•	•	•	•	•	•	•	•	17
Montserrat	Not a CONCACAF member										•	×	•	×	•	•	×	•	×	×	•	•	•	×	•	•	•	•	•	13
Puerto Rico	×	×	×	×	×	•	×	×	×	•	•	•	•	•	•	•	•	•	•	•	•	•	•	•	•	•	•	•		21
Saint Martin	Not a CONCACAF member									×	×	×	×	×	×	•	•	•	•	•	•	•	•	•	•	•	•	•	•	14
Sint Maarten	Part of Netherlands Antilles											•	•	•	×	×	×	×	×	×	×	×	×	•	•	•	•	•	•	9
Turks and Caicos Islands	Not a CONCACAF member														•	×	×	×	•	×	×	×	•	•	•	•	•	•	•	9
U.S. Virgin Islands	Not a CONCACAF member														•	•	•	•	•	×	×	×	•	•	•	•	•	•	•	12

== Host nations and venues ==
Times	Nation	Year(s)
18	United States	1991, 1993, 1996, 1998, 2000, 2002, 2003, 2005, 2007, 2009, 2011, 2013, 2015, 2017, 2019, 2021, 2023, 2025
3	Mexico	1977, 1993, 2003
3	Canada	2015, (Note: Minor host. This nation hosted two or fewer matches this edition.) 2023, 2025
2	Honduras	1967, 1981
2	Costa Rica	1969, 2019
1	El Salvador	1963
1	Guatemala	1965
1	Trinidad and Tobago	1971
1	Haiti	1973
1	Jamaica	2019

- Co-hosted by the United States and Mexico in 1993 and 2003
- Co-hosted by the United States and Canada in 2015, 2023 and 2025
- Co-hosted by the United States, Costa Rica and Jamaica in 2019

== Hosts and defending champions ==
=== Hosts ===
Edition	Hosts	Result
1963	El Salvador	Runners-up
1965	Guatemala	Runners-up
1967	Honduras	Third place
1969	Costa Rica	Champions
1971	Trinidad and Tobago	Fifth place
1973	Haiti	Champions
1977	Mexico	Champions
1981	Honduras	Champions
1991	United States	Champions
1993	United States	Runners-up
1993	Mexico	Champions
1996	United States	Third place
1998	United States	Runners-up
2000	United States	Quarter-finals
2002	United States	Champions
2003	United States	Third place
2003	Mexico	Champions
2005	United States	Champions
2007	United States	Champions
2009	United States	Runners-up
2011	United States	Runners-up
2013	United States	Champions
2015	United States	Fourth place
2015	Canada	Group stage
2017	United States	Champions
2019	United States	Runners-up
2019	Costa Rica	Quarter-finals
2019	Jamaica	Semi-finals
2021	United States	Champions
2023	United States	Semi-finals
2023	Canada	Quarter-finals
2025	United States	Runners-up
2025	Canada	Quarter-finals

=== Defending champions ===
Edition	Defending champions	Result
1965	Costa Rica	Third place
1967	Mexico	Runners-up
1969	Guatemala	Runners-up
1971	Costa Rica	Third place
1973	Mexico	Third place
1977	Haiti	Runners-up
1981	Mexico	Third place
1985	Honduras	Runners-up
1989	Canada	Did not qualify
1991	Costa Rica	Fourth place
1993	United States	Runners-up
1996	Mexico	Champions
1998	Mexico	Champions
2000	Mexico	Quarter-finals
2002	Canada	Third place
2003	United States	Third place
2005	Mexico	Quarter-finals
2007	United States	Champions
2009	United States	Runners-up
2011	Mexico	Champions
2013	Mexico	Semi-finals
2015	United States	Fourth place
2017	Mexico	Semi-finals
2019	United States	Runners-up
2021	Mexico	Runners-up
2023	United States	Semi-finals
2025	Mexico	Champions
2027	Mexico	TBD

== Active participation streaks ==
This is a list of active consecutive participations of national teams in the CONCACAF Gold Cup and CONCACAF Championship.

Team	Qualified since	Number of participations
United States	1985	21 (Note: Includes upcoming 2027 tournament)
Mexico	1991	19
Costa Rica	1998	15
Canada	2000	15
Honduras	2003	12
Panama	2005	12
El Salvador	2007	10
Jamaica	2015	6
Haiti	2019	4
Trinidad and Tobago	2019	4
Guatemala	2021	3
Curaçao	2025	1
Dominican Republic	2025	1
Suriname	2025	1
Cuba	2027	1
Guyana	2027	1
Saint Lucia	2027	1
Saint Vincent and the Grenadines	2027	1

== Active participation droughts ==
This is a list of droughts associated with the participation of national teams in the CONCACAF Gold Cup.
Does not include teams that have not yet made their first appearance, teams that no longer exist, or guest teams.

Team	Last appearance	Number of misses
Belize	2013	7
French Guiana	2017	4
Bermuda	2019	4
Nicaragua	2019	3
Grenada	2021	3
Martinique	2023	2
Saint Kitts and Nevis	2023	2
Guadeloupe	2025	1

== Goalscoring records ==
=== Top 20 goal leaders ===
- Only CONCACAF Gold Cup matches counted towards all-time records. Stats from qualification are not included.
- Players in **bold** have not retired from international football and may still be called up to their national team.

As of 6 July 2025

Rank	Player	Gold Cup goals																		Total
Rank	Player	'91	'93	'96	'98	'00	'02	'03	'05	'07	'09	'11	'13	'15	'17	'19	'21	'23	'25	Total
1	(United States) Landon Donovan						1	4	3	4		1	5							18
2	(United States) Clint Dempsey								1	1		3		7	1					13
3	(Mexico) Luís Roberto Alves	1	11																	12
3	(Mexico) Andrés Guardado									1		3		6		2				12
5	(Panama) **Ismael Díaz**														1			4	6	11
5	(Panama) Blas Pérez									3	3	1	3	1						11
7	(Mexico) **Raúl Jiménez**												2			5			3	10
7	(Panama) Luis Tejada								3		2	3		2						10
9	(Costa Rica) Walter Centeno						1	4		3	1									9
9	(Honduras) Carlos Pavón				1	3				5										9
9	(United States) Eric Wynalda	1	2	4	1	1														9
9	(El Salvador) Rodolfo Zelaya											4	4		1					9
13	(Honduras) Carlo Costly									3	2	3								8
13	(Canada) **Jonathan David**															6			2	8
13	(United States) Brian McBride					1	4	3												8
13	(Guatemala) Carlos Ruiz							1	3	1		2		1						8
13	(Panama) Gabriel Torres												5		2	1				8
13	(Costa Rica) Paulo Wanchope				4	2	2													8
19	(Honduras) Eduardo Bennett	3	4																	7
19	(Mexico) Jared Borgetti							3	2	2										7
19	(United States) **Jesús Ferreira**																	7		7
19	(Mexico) Javier Hernández											7								7
