= Honduras at the FIFA World Cup =

International football delegation

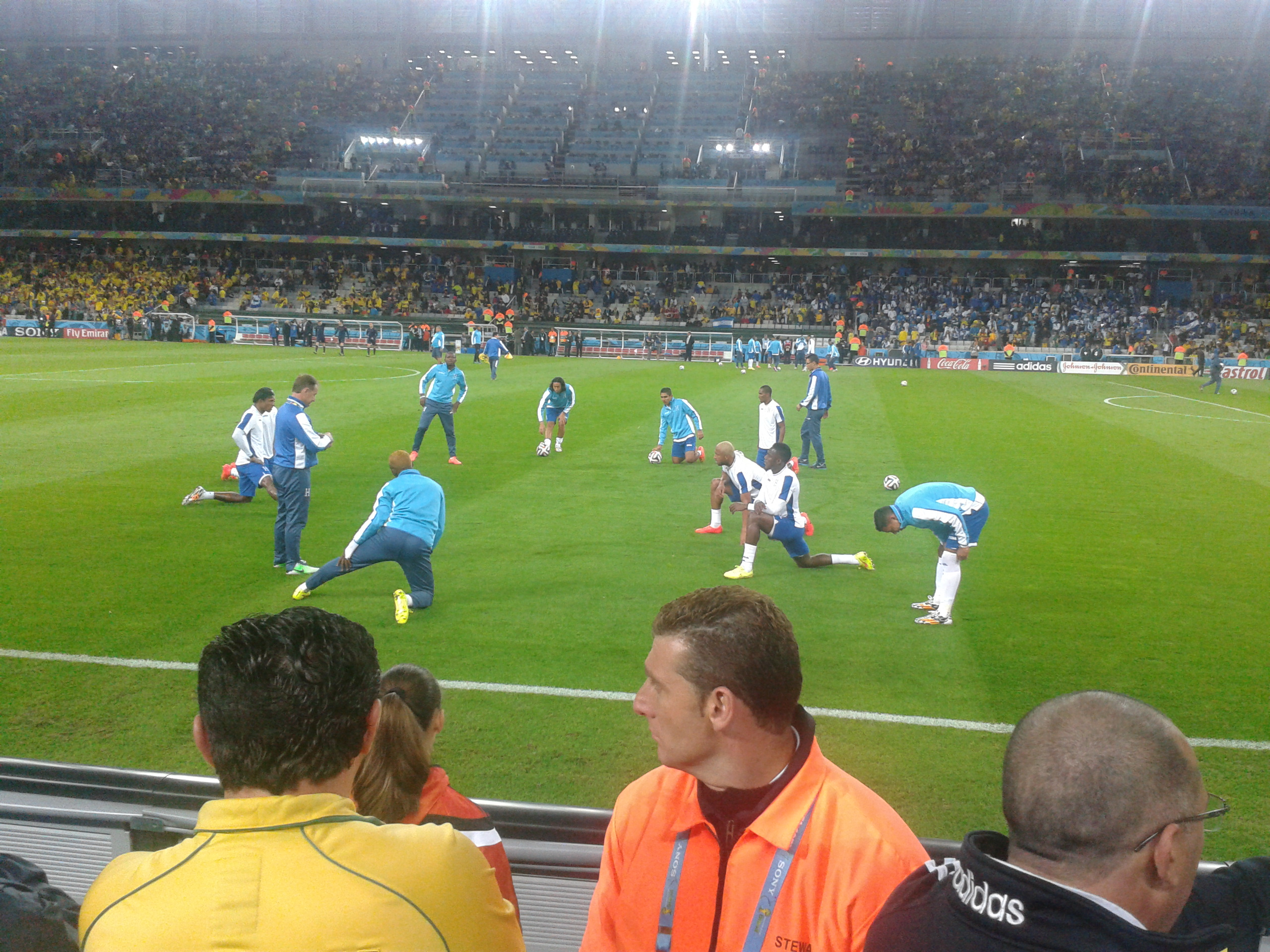
The Honduran team training before facing Ecuador at the 2014 FIFA World Cup

This is a record of Honduras results at the FIFA World Cup. They made their debut in 1982 FIFA World Cup in Spain.

== Overall record ==
FIFA World Cup record
Year	Round	Position	Pld	W	D*	L	GF	GA
(Uruguay) 1930	Not a FIFA member							
(Italy) 1934	Not a FIFA member							
(France) 1938	Not a FIFA member							
(Brazil) 1950	Did not enter							
(Switzerland) 1954	Did not enter							
(Sweden) 1958	Did not enter							
(Chile) 1962	Did not qualify							
(England) 1966	Did not qualify							
(Mexico) 1970	Did not qualify							
(West Germany) 1974	Did not qualify							
(Argentina) 1978	Withdrew							
(Spain) 1982	Group stage	18th	3	0	2	1	2	3
(Mexico) 1986	Did not qualify							
(Italy) 1990	Did not qualify							
(United States) 1994	Did not qualify							
(France) 1998	Did not qualify							
(South Korea) (Japan) 2002	Did not qualify							
(Germany) 2006	Did not qualify							
(South Africa) 2010	Group stage	30th	3	0	1	2	0	3
(Brazil) 2014	Group stage	31st	3	0	0	3	1	8
(Russia) 2018	Did not qualify							
(Qatar) 2022	Did not qualify							
(Canada) (Mexico) (United States) 2026	Did not qualify							
(Morocco) (Portugal) (Spain) 2030	To be determined							
(Saudi Arabia) 2034	To be determined							
Total	Group stage	3/23	9	0	3	6	3	14

== Spain 1982 ==
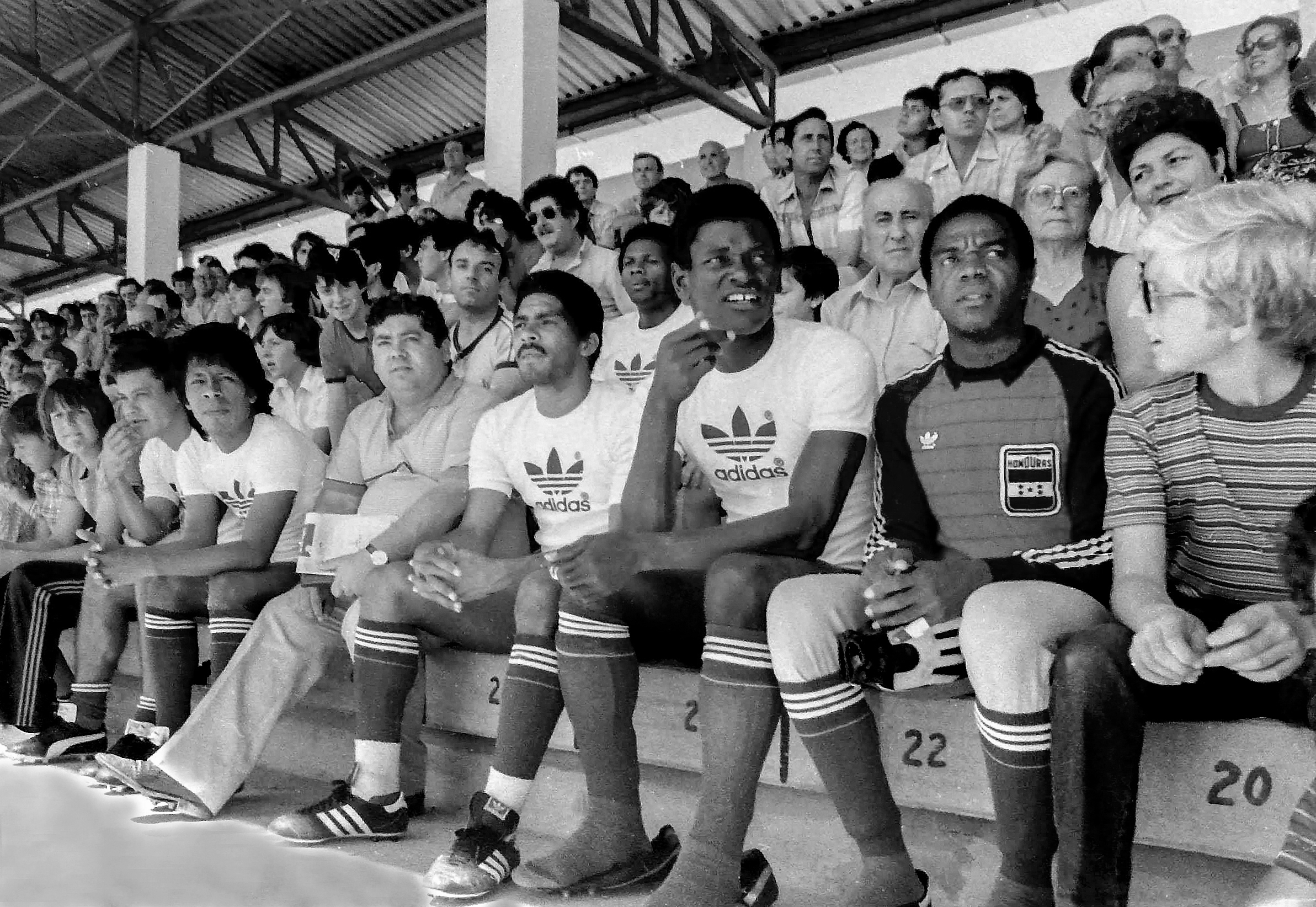
The Honduran team in Alginet, Valencian Community, a few days before their match against Spain

Team	Pld	W	D	L	GF	GA	GD	Pts
Northern Ireland	3	1	2	0	2	1	1	4
Spain	3	1	1	1	3	3	0	3
Yugoslavia	3	1	1	1	2	2	0	3
Honduras	3	0	2	1	2	3	-1	2

=== Spain vs Honduras ===
16 June 1982
21:00 CEST

Spain	1–1	Honduras
Lopez Ufarte 65' (pen.)	Report	Zelaya 8'

Estadio Luis Casanova, Valencia
Attendance: 49,562
Referee: Arturo Ithurralde (Argentina)

=== Honduras vs Northern Ireland ===
21 June 1982
21:00 CEST

Honduras	1–1	Northern Ireland
Laing 60'	Report	Armstrong 10'

La Romareda, Zaragoza
Attendance: 15,000
Referee: Chan Tam Sun (Hong Kong)

=== Honduras vs Yugoslavia ===
24 June 1982
21:00 CEST

Honduras	0–1	Yugoslavia
	Report	Petrović 88' (pen.)

La Romareda, Zaragoza
Attendance: 25,000
Referee: Gasto Castro (Chile)

== South Africa 2010 ==
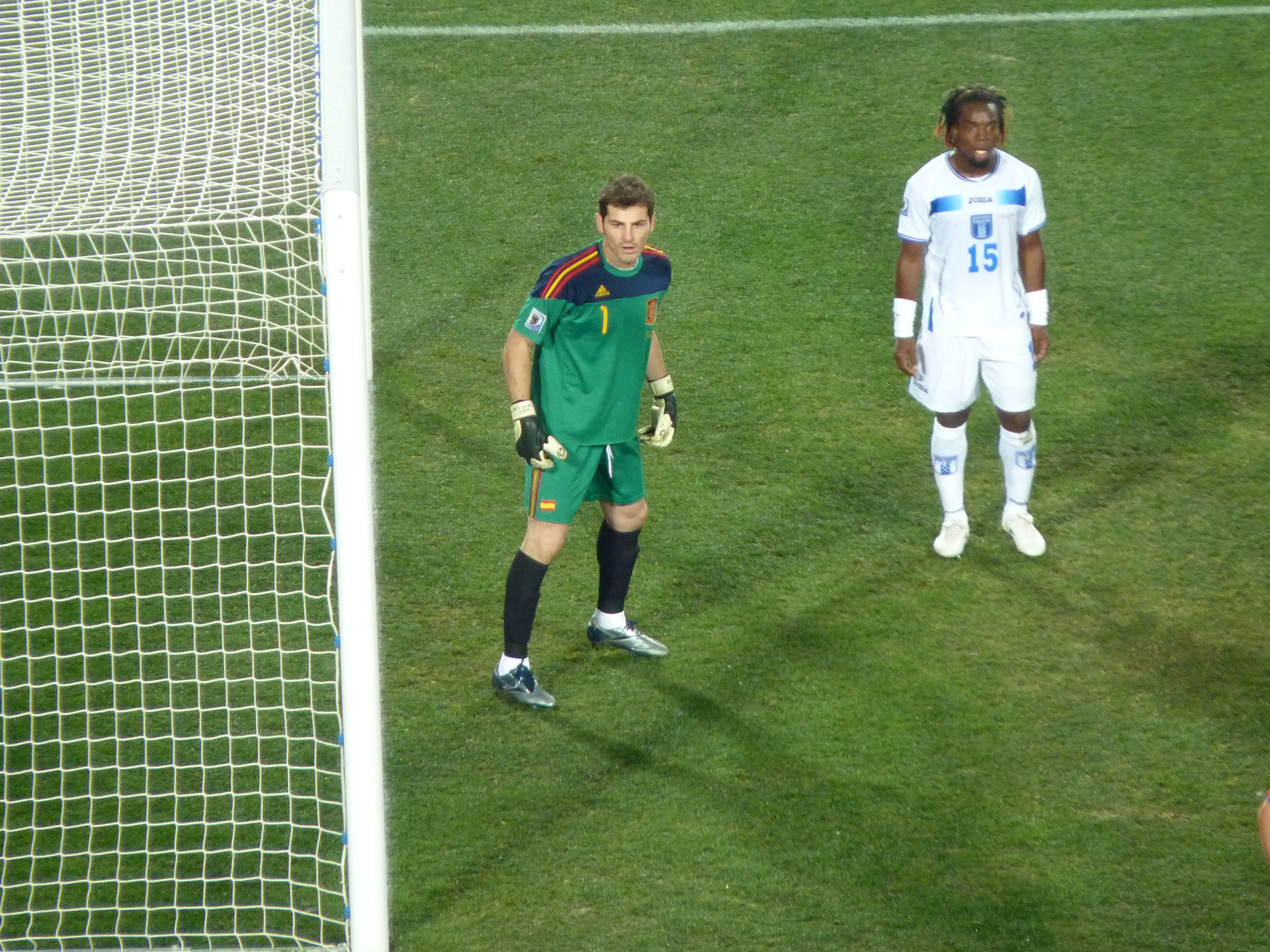
Spain's Iker Casillas and Honduras' Walter Martínez

Pos	Team	Pld	W	D	L	GF	GA	GD	Pts	Qualification
1	Spain	3	2	0	1	4	2	+2	6	Advance to knockout stage
2	Chile	3	2	0	1	3	2	+1	6	Advance to knockout stage
3	Switzerland	3	1	1	1	1	1	0	4	
4	Honduras	3	0	1	2	0	3	−3	1	

Source: FIFA
Rules for classification: Tie-breaking criteria

All times local (UTC+2)

=== Honduras vs Chile ===
16 June 2010
13:30

Honduras	0–1	Chile
	Report	Beausejour 34'

Mbombela Stadium, Nelspruit
Attendance: 32,664
Referee: Eddy Maillet (Seychelles)

Honduras	Chile

GK	18	Noel Valladares
RB	23	Sergio Mendoza
CB	2	Osman Chávez
CB	3	Maynor Figueroa
LB	21	Emilio Izaguirre
CM	8	Wilson Palacios	(yellow card) 33'
CM	20	Amado Guevara (c)		(substituted off) 66'
RW	17	Edgar Álvarez
AM	7	Ramón Núñez		(substituted off) 78'
LW	13	Roger Espinoza
CF	9	Carlos Pavón		(substituted off) 60'
Substitutions:
FW	12	Georgie Welcome		(substituted on) 60'
MF	6	Hendry Thomas		(substituted on) 66'
FW	15	Walter Martínez		(substituted on) 78'
Manager:
(Colombia) Alexis Mendoza

GK	1	Claudio Bravo (c)
RB	4	Mauricio Isla
CB	17	Gary Medel
CB	3	Waldo Ponce
LB	8	Arturo Vidal		(substituted off) 81'
RM	20	Rodrigo Millar		(substituted off) 52'
CM	6	Carlos Carmona	(yellow card) 4'
LM	14	Matías Fernández	(yellow card) 19'
SS	10	Jorge Valdivia		(substituted off) 87'
CF	7	Alexis Sánchez
CF	15	Jean Beausejour
Substitutions:
DF	18	Gonzalo Jara		(substituted on) 52'
DF	5	Pablo Contreras		(substituted on) 81'
FW	11	Mark González		(substituted on) 87'
Manager:
(Argentina) Marcelo Bielsa

Man of the Match:
Jean Beausejour (Chile)

Assistant referees:
Evarist Menkouande (Cameroon)
Bechir Hassani (Tunisia)
Fourth official:
Yuichi Nishimura (Japan)
Fifth official:
Toru Sagara (Japan)

=== Spain vs Honduras ===
21 June 2010
20:30

Spain	2–0	Honduras
Villa 17', 51'	Report

Ellis Park Stadium, Johannesburg
Attendance: 54,386
Referee: Yuichi Nishimura (Japan)

Spain	Honduras

GK	1	Iker Casillas (c)
RB	15	Sergio Ramos	(substituted off) 77'
CB	5	Carles Puyol
CB	3	Gerard Piqué
LB	11	Joan Capdevila
DM	16	Sergio Busquets
RM	22	Jesús Navas
LM	14	Xabi Alonso
AM	8	Xavi	(substituted off) 66'
CF	9	Fernando Torres	(substituted off) 70'
CF	7	David Villa
Substitutions:
MF	10	Cesc Fàbregas	(substituted on) 66'
MF	13	Juan Manuel Mata	(substituted on) 70'
DF	17	Álvaro Arbeloa	(substituted on) 77'
Manager:
Vicente del Bosque

GK	18	Noel Valladares
RB	23	Sergio Mendoza
CB	2	Osman Chávez
CB	3	Maynor Figueroa
LB	21	Emilio Izaguirre	(yellow card) 38'
CM	8	Wilson Palacios
CM	20	Amado Guevara (c)
RW	19	Danilo Turcios	(yellow card) 8'	(substituted off) 63'
AM	15	Walter Martínez
LW	13	Roger Espinoza		(substituted off) 46'
CF	11	David Suazo		(substituted off) 84'
Substitutions:
FW	12	Georgie Welcome		(substituted on) 46'
MF	7	Ramón Núñez		(substituted on) 63'
FW	10	Jerry Palacios		(substituted on) 84'
Manager:
(Colombia) Reinaldo Rueda

Man of the Match:
David Villa (Spain)

Assistant referees:
Toru Sagara (Japan)
Jeong Hae-Sang (South Korea)
Fourth official:
Subkhiddin Mohd Salleh (Malaysia)
Fifth official:
Jeffrey Gek Pheng (Singapore)

=== Switzerland vs Honduras ===
25 June 2010
20:30

Switzerland	0–0	Honduras
	Report

Free State Stadium, Bloemfontein
Attendance: 28,042
Referee: Héctor Baldassi (Argentina)

Switzerland	Honduras

GK	1	Diego Benaglio
RB	2	Stephan Lichtsteiner
CB	5	Steve von Bergen
CB	13	Stéphane Grichting
LB	17	Reto Ziegler
RM	7	Tranquillo Barnetta
CM	6	Benjamin Huggel		(substituted off) 78'
CM	8	Gökhan Inler (c)
LM	16	Gelson Fernandes	(yellow card) 34'	(substituted off) 46'
CF	19	Eren Derdiyok
CF	10	Blaise Nkufo		(substituted off) 69'
Substitutions:
MF	15	Hakan Yakin		(substituted on) 46'
FW	9	Alexander Frei		(substituted on) 69'
MF	23	Xherdan Shaqiri		(substituted on) 78'
Manager:
(Germany) Ottmar Hitzfeld

GK	18	Noel Valladares (c)
RB	16	Mauricio Sabillón
CB	2	Osman Chávez	(yellow card) 64'
CB	5	Víctor Bernárdez
LB	3	Maynor Figueroa
CM	8	Wilson Palacios	(yellow card) 89'
CM	6	Hendry Thomas	(yellow card) 4'
RW	17	Edgar Álvarez
LW	7	Ramón Núñez		(substituted off) 67'
CF	10	Jerry Palacios		(substituted off) 78'
CF	11	David Suazo	(yellow card) 58'	(substituted off) 87'
Substitutions:
FW	15	Walter Martínez		(substituted on) 67'
FW	12	Georgie Welcome		(substituted on) 78'
MF	19	Danilo Turcios		(substituted on) 87'
Manager:
(Colombia) Reinaldo Rueda

Man of the Match:
Noel Valladares (Honduras)

Assistant referees:
Ricardo Casas (Argentina)
Hernan Maidana (Argentina)
Fourth official:
Olegário Benquerença (Portugal)
Fifth official:
Jose Manuel Silva Cardinal (Portugal)

== Brazil 2014 ==
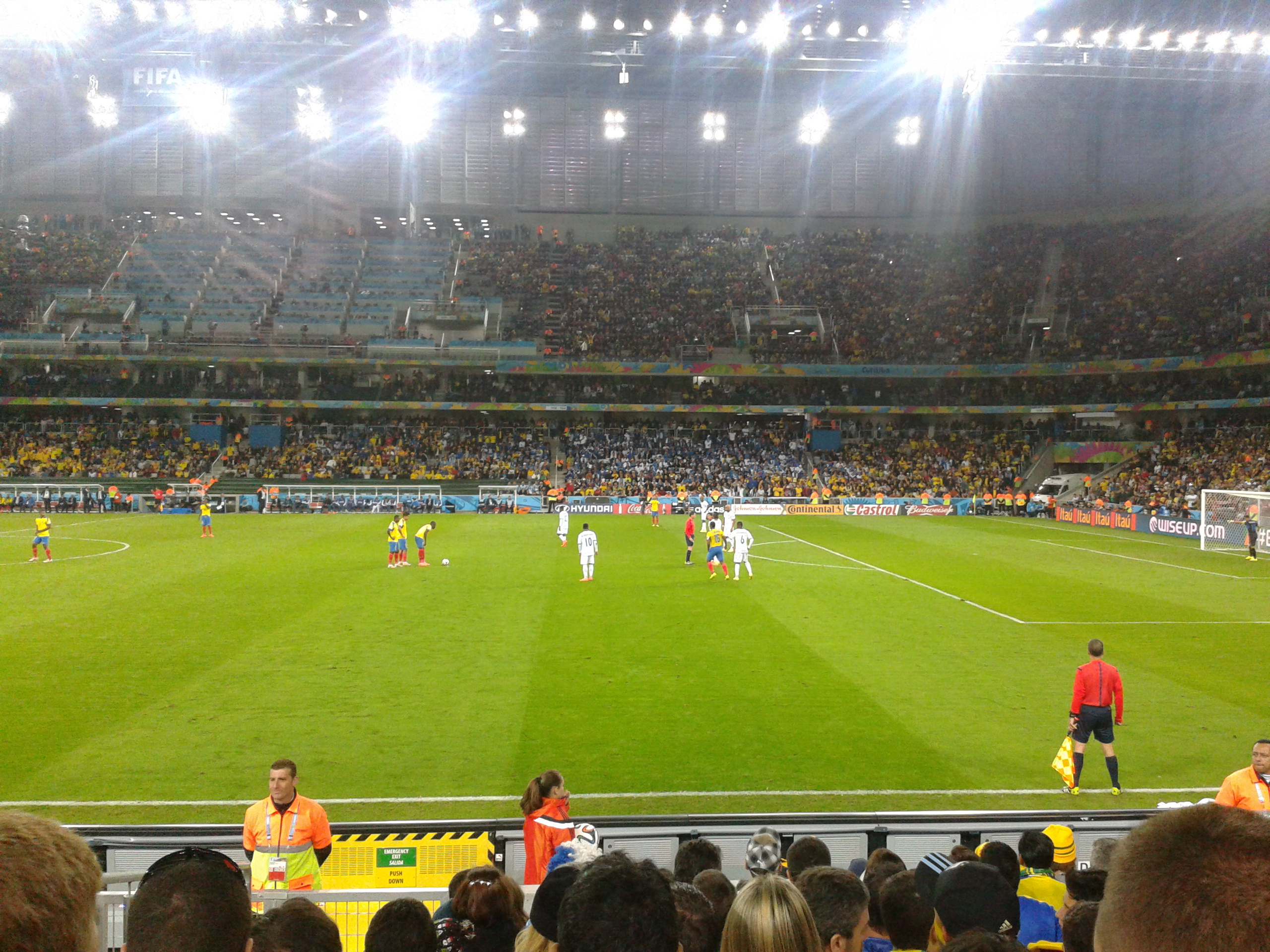
Honduras facing Ecuador

Pos	Team	Pld	W	D	L	GF	GA	GD	Pts	Qualification
1	France	3	2	1	0	8	2	+6	7	Advance to knockout stage
2	Switzerland	3	2	0	1	7	6	+1	6	Advance to knockout stage
3	Ecuador	3	1	1	1	3	3	0	4	
4	Honduras	3	0	0	3	1	8	−7	0	

Source: FIFA
Rules for classification: Tie-breaking criteria

=== France vs Honduras ===
15 June 2014
16:00 UTC−3

France	3–0	Honduras
Benzema 45' (pen.), 72'; Valladares 48' (o.g.)	Report

Estádio Beira-Rio, Porto Alegre
Attendance: 43,012
Referee: Sandro Ricci (Brazil)

France	Honduras

GK	1	Hugo Lloris (c)
RB	2	Mathieu Debuchy
CB	4	Raphaël Varane
CB	5	Mamadou Sakho
LB	3	Patrice Evra	(yellow card) 7'
DM	6	Yohan Cabaye	(yellow card) 45+2'	(substituted off) 65'
CM	14	Blaise Matuidi
CM	19	Paul Pogba	(yellow card) 28'	(substituted off) 57'
RF	8	Mathieu Valbuena		(substituted off) 78'
CF	10	Karim Benzema
LF	11	Antoine Griezmann
Substitutions:
MF	18	Moussa Sissoko		(substituted on) 57'
MF	12	Rio Mavuba		(substituted on) 65'
FW	9	Olivier Giroud		(substituted on) 78'
Manager:
Didier Deschamps

GK	18	Noel Valladares (c)
RB	3	Maynor Figueroa
CB	21	Brayan Beckeles
CB	5	Víctor Bernárdez		(substituted off) 46'
LB	7	Emilio Izaguirre
RM	17	Andy Najar		(substituted off) 58'
CM	19	Luis Garrido	(yellow card) 83'
CM	8	Wilson Palacios	(yellow card) 28' (yellow-red card) 43'
LM	15	Roger Espinoza
SS	13	Carlo Costly
CF	11	Jerry Bengtson		(substituted off) 46'
Substitutions:
MF	14	Óscar García	(yellow card) 53'	(substituted on) 46'
DF	2	Osman Chávez		(substituted on) 46'
MF	20	Jorge Claros		(substituted on) 58'
Manager:
(Colombia) Luis Fernando Suárez

Man of the Match:
Karim Benzema (France)

Assistant referees:
Emerson de Carvalho (Brazil)
Marcelo Van Gasse (Brazil)
Fourth official:
Peter O'Leary (New Zealand)
Fifth official:
Jan-Hendrik Hintz (New Zealand)

=== Honduras vs Ecuador ===
20 June 2014
19:00 UTC−3

Honduras	1–2	Ecuador
Costly 31'	Report	E. Valencia 34', 65'

Arena da Baixada, Curitiba
Attendance: 39,224
Referee: Ben Williams (Australia)

Honduras	Ecuador

GK	18	Noel Valladares (c)
RB	21	Brayan Beckeles
CB	5	Víctor Bernárdez	(yellow card) 7'
CB	3	Maynor Figueroa
LB	7	Emilio Izaguirre		(substituted off) 46'
RM	14	Óscar García		(substituted off) 83'
CM	19	Luis Garrido		(substituted off) 71'
CM	20	Jorge Claros
LM	15	Roger Espinoza
SS	13	Carlo Costly
CF	11	Jerry Bengtson	(yellow card) 45+3'
Substitutions:
DF	6	Juan Carlos García		(substituted on) 46'
MF	10	Mario Martínez		(substituted on) 71'
MF	23	Marvin Chávez		(substituted on) 83'
Manager:
(Colombia) Luis Fernando Suárez

GK	22	Alexander Domínguez
RB	4	Juan Carlos Paredes
CB	3	Frickson Erazo
CB	2	Jorge Guagua
LB	10	Walter Ayoví
RM	16	Antonio Valencia (c)	(yellow card) 57'
CM	14	Oswaldo Minda		(substituted off) 83'
CM	6	Christian Noboa
LM	7	Jefferson Montero	(yellow card) 80'	(substituted off) 90+2'
CF	11	Felipe Caicedo		(substituted off) 82'
CF	13	Enner Valencia	(yellow card) 73'
Substitutions:
MF	8	Édison Méndez		(substituted on) 82'
MF	23	Carlos Gruezo		(substituted on) 83'
DF	21	Gabriel Achilier		(substituted on) 90+2'
Manager:
(Colombia) Reinaldo Rueda

Man of the Match:
Enner Valencia (Ecuador)

Assistant referees:
Matthew Cream (Australia)
Hakan Anaz (Australia)
Fourth official:
Yuichi Nishimura (Japan)
Fifth official:
Toru Sagara (Japan)

=== Honduras vs Switzerland ===
25 June 2014
16:00 UTC−4

Honduras	0–3	Switzerland
	Report	Shaqiri 6', 31', 71'

Arena da Amazônia, Manaus
Attendance: 40,322
Referee: Néstor Pitana (Argentina)

Honduras	Switzerland

GK	18	Noel Valladares (c)
RB	21	Brayan Beckeles
CB	5	Víctor Bernárdez
CB	3	Maynor Figueroa
LB	6	Juan Carlos García
CM	20	Jorge Claros
CM	8	Wilson Palacios
RW	14	Óscar García		(substituted off) 77'
LW	15	Roger Espinoza		(substituted off) 46'
SS	13	Carlo Costly		(substituted off) 40'
CF	11	Jerry Bengtson
Substitutions:
FW	9	Jerry Palacios	(yellow card) 66'	(substituted on) 40'
MF	23	Marvin Chávez		(substituted on) 46'
MF	17	Andy Najar		(substituted on) 77'
Manager:
(Colombia) Luis Fernando Suárez

GK	1	Diego Benaglio
RB	2	Stephan Lichtsteiner
CB	20	Johan Djourou
CB	22	Fabian Schär
LB	13	Ricardo Rodríguez
CM	11	Valon Behrami
CM	8	Gökhan Inler (c)
RW	23	Xherdan Shaqiri	(substituted off) 87'
AM	10	Granit Xhaka	(substituted off) 77'
LW	18	Admir Mehmedi
CF	19	Josip Drmić	(substituted off) 74'
Substitutions:
FW	9	Haris Seferovic	(substituted on) 74'
DF	6	Michael Lang	(substituted on) 77'
MF	15	Blerim Džemaili	(substituted on) 87'
Manager:
(Germany) Ottmar Hitzfeld

Man of the Match:
Xherdan Shaqiri (Switzerland)

Assistant referees:
Hernán Maidana (Argentina)
Juan Pablo Belatti (Argentina)
Fourth official:
Milorad Mažić (Serbia)
Fifth official:
Milovan Ristić (Serbia)

== Player records ==
=== Most appearances ===
Rank	Player	Matches	World Cups
1	Maynor Figueroa	6	2010 and 2014
1	Noel Valladares	6	2010 and 2014
3	Roger Espinoza	5	2010 and 2014
3	Wilson Palacios	5	2010 and 2014
5	Víctor Bernárdez	4	2010 and 2014
5	Osman Chávez	4	2010 and 2014
5	Emilio Izaguirre	4	2010 and 2014
8	Seventeen players	3	Various

=== Goalscorers ===
Player	Goals	1982	2010	2014
Héctor Zelaya	1	1		
Eduardo Laing	1	1		
Carlo Costly	1			1
Total	3	2	0	1

== Head-to-head record ==
Opponent	Pld	W	D	L	GF	GA	GD	Win %
Chile	1	0	0	1	0	1	−1	0.00
Ecuador	1	0	0	1	1	2	−1	0.00
France	1	0	0	1	0	3	−3	0.00
Northern Ireland	1	0	1	0	1	1	+0	0.00
Spain	2	0	1	1	1	3	−2	0.00
Switzerland	2	0	1	1	0	3	−3	0.00
Yugoslavia	1	0	0	1	0	1	−1	0.00
Total	9	0	3	6	3	14	−11	0.00

== See also ==
- Honduras at the CONCACAF Gold Cup
- Honduras at the Copa América
- North, Central American and Caribbean nations at the FIFA World Cup
