= Honduras at the Copa América =

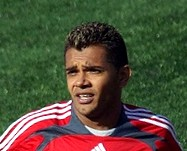
Attacking midfielder Amado Guevara was honoured as the best player of the 2001 tournament, the only Copa América that Honduras has competed in. It was the only time this award was given to a player from an invited nation.

The Copa América is South America's major tournament in senior men's football and determines the continental champion. Until 1967, the tournament was known as South American Championship. It is the oldest continental championship in the world.

Honduras are not members of the South American football confederation CONMEBOL. But because CONMEBOL only has ten member associations, guest nations have regularly been invited since 1993.

In 2001, there were several problems with the planned Copa América and was even officially cancelled at one point. When plans of postponement to 2002 did not work out either, the tournament was held as scheduled. However, two teams withdrew: Invitees Canada had already disbanded the squad after the initial cancellation, and Argentina withdrew on the grounds that they were receiving death threats.

Costa Rica was quickly found as a substitute for Canada - and eventually Honduras agreed to substitute for Argentina. The announcement came on July 10, one day before the inaugural match, and three days before the first match of Honduras. In spite of star players missing, they did well in that tournament, placing Third, and with Amado Guevara awarded as the tournament's MVP.

Honduras had won a continental title in the past: The CONCACAF Championship in 1981, a home tournament for them.

In 2016, the Copa América Centenario was a tournament co-hosted by CONCACAF and CONMEBOL and would have been Honduras' chance to play in a second Copa América, but they failed to qualify.

== Record at the Copa América ==
Copa América
Year	Round	Position	Pld	W	D*	L	GF	GA
1916 – 1999	Not invited							
(Colombia) 2001	Third place	3rd	6	3	1	2	7	5
2004 – 2015	Not invited							
(United States) 2016	Did not qualify							
2019 – 2021	Not invited							
(United States) 2024	Did not qualify							
Total	1 participation	14/20	6	3	1	2	7	5

* Draws include matches decided on penalties.

== Squad ==
=== Notable absences ===
At the beginning of the 2001 Copa América, the final stage of the Honduran league system was still ongoing, and the involved clubs, Real España, Marathón, Olimpia and Platense, did not put their Honduran players up for national selection on such short notice and during the decisive phase of the season.

For that or similar reasons, several players were missing in the Honduran squad who held important roles at the 2000 CONCACAF Gold Cup one year prior. Carlos Pavón, Milton Núñez, José Pineda and Julio César de León were among those left out.

== Match overview ==
Tournament	Round	Opponent	Score	Venue
(Colombia) 2001	Group stage	Costa Rica	0–1	Medellín
(Colombia) 2001	Group stage	Bolivia	2–0	Medellín
(Colombia) 2001	Group stage	Uruguay	1–0	Medellín
(Colombia) 2001	Quarter-final	Brazil	2–0	Manizales
(Colombia) 2001	Semi-final	Colombia	0–2	Manizales
(Colombia) 2001	Third place match	Uruguay	2–2 (5–4 p)	Bogotá

== Record players ==
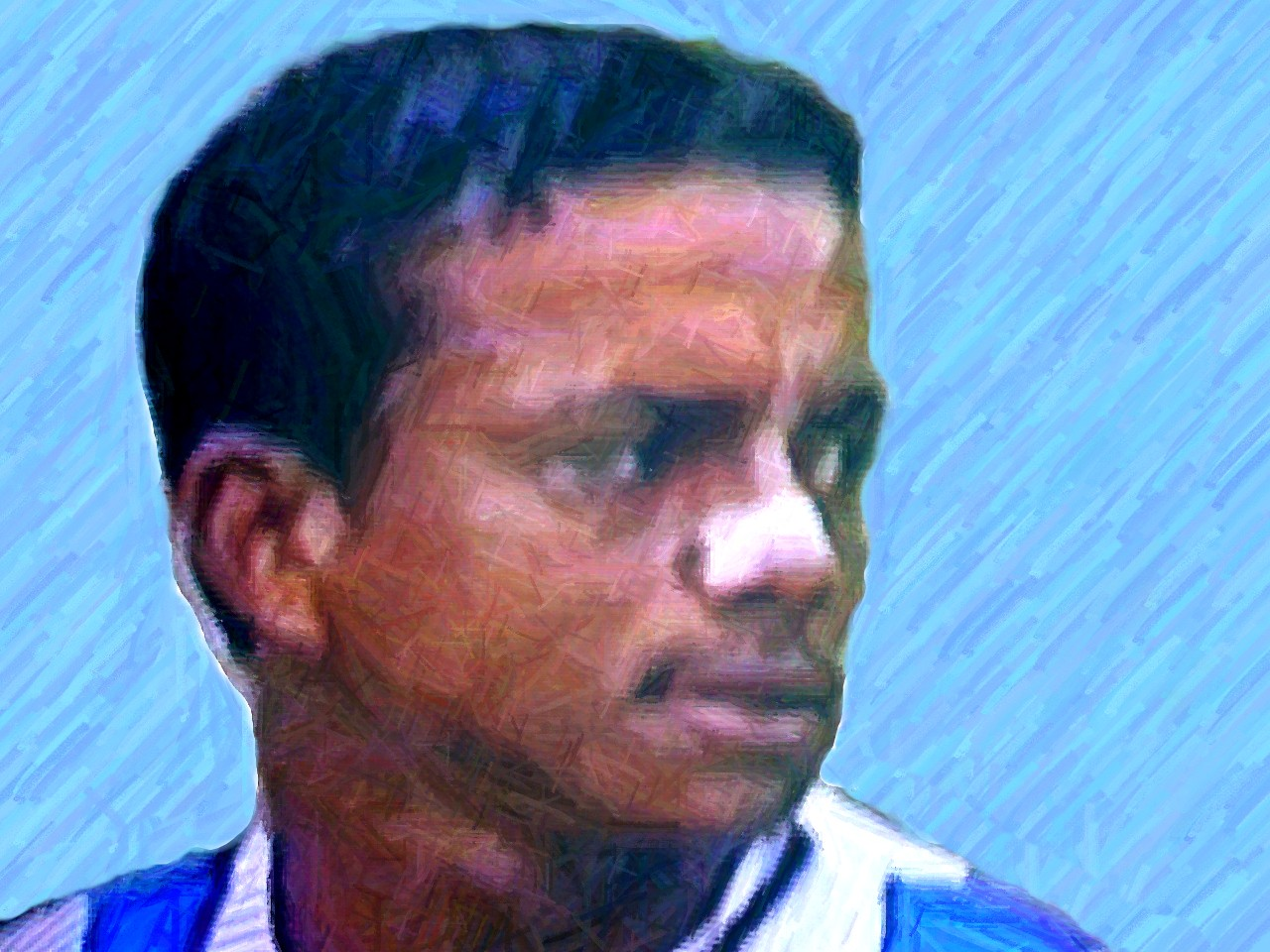
Danilo Turcios played in all six matches of Honduras' third-place run.

Of the five players who were active in all six matches, Amado Guevara has played the most minutes. He was only substituted in the 90th minute of the last match.

Rank	Player	Matches
1	Amado Guevara	6
1	Saúl Martínez	6
1	Ninrrol Medina	6
1	Mario Rodríguez	6
1	Danilo Turcios	6
6	Robel Bernárdez	5
6	Samuel Caballero	5
6	Ricky García	5
6	Limber Pérez	5
6	Noel Valladares	5

== Top goalscorers ==
Rank	Player	Goals
1	Amado Guevara	3
1	Saúl Martínez	3
3	Júnior Izaguirre	1

== See also ==
- Honduras at the FIFA World Cup
- Honduras at the CONCACAF Gold Cup

== Head-to-head record ==
Opponent	Pld	W	D	L	GF	GA	GD	Win %
Bolivia	1	1	0	0	2	0	+2	100.00
Brazil	1	1	0	0	2	0	+2	100.00
Colombia	1	0	0	1	0	2	−2	0.00
Costa Rica	1	0	0	1	0	1	−1	0.00
Uruguay	2	1	1	0	3	2	+1	50.00
Total	6	3	1	2	7	5	+2	50.00
