= Keith Douglas (footballer) =

Trinidadian footballer (1950–2012)

Personal information
- Full name: George Suitbert Romano
- Date of birth: 23 April 1950
- Place of birth: Point Fortin Trinidad and Tobago
- Date of death: 12 March 2012 (aged 62)
- Position: Forward

Youth career
- Belmont Secondary

Senior career*
Years	Team	Apps	(Gls)
c. 1969–1970	Point Fortin Civic		

International career
1969	Trinidad and Tobago	4	(1)
- * Club domestic league appearances and goals

Keith Douglas, later known as Saleem Muhammad (24 April 1950 – 12 March 2012) was a Trinidadian footballer. He played for Point Fortin Civic throughout the early 1970s as a forward. He also represented his native Trinidad and Tobago for the 1969 CONCACAF Championship.

== International career ==
Douglas was called up for the 1969 CONCACAF Championship by manager Trevor Smith. He had his best performance during his first match against Jamaica where scored the equalizing goal in what later became a 3–2 victory. He also played in the matches against Netherlands Antilles, Costa Rica and Mexico with the matches resulting in two defeats and a draw respectively.

== Later life ==
His father, Neville “Watty” Douglas, played for UBOT and for the national team throughout the 1950s. Keith is also brothers with fellow Trinidad international Tony Douglas. Douglas converted to Islam at some point and had three children: Saleema, Suafiya and Kareem. He died on 12 March 2012 with his funeral being held 6 days later with his former teammates such as Gwenwyn Cust and Selby Browne attending it. That same year saw a memorial game dedicated to him on 27 April between former players of the North and South.
