= Álvaro Cascante =

Costa Rican footballer (born 1945)

Personal information
- Full name: Álvaro Cascante Barquero
- Date of birth: 19 February 1945 (age 81)
- Place of birth: San José, San José Province, Costa Rica
- Height: 1.70 m (5 ft 7 in)
- Position: Midfielder

Senior career*
Years	Team	Apps	(Gls)
1964–1966	Alajuelense		
1967–1968	Águila		
1968–1970	Sonsonate		
1969–1970	→ Cartaginés (loan)		
1970–1974	Herediano		
1973	→ Saprissa (loan)		
1974–1976	Cartaginés		
1977–1978	Uruguay de Coronado		
1979–1981	San Miguel		

International career
1969–1971	Costa Rica	12	(2)
Medal record
Men's football
Representing Costa Rica
CONCACAF Championship
Gold medal – first place	1969 Costa Rica	Team
Bronze medal – third place	1971 Trinidad and Tobago	Team
- * Club domestic league appearances and goals

Álvaro Cascante Barquero (born 19 February 1945) is a Costa Rican retired footballer. He was distinguished for playing for nearly every major Costan Rican club throughout the 1960s and the 1970s including tenures with Alajuelense, Cartaginés, Herediano and Saprissa as well as a career abroad in El Salvador for Águila and Sonsonate. He also represented his native Costa Rica internationally for the 1969 and 1971 CONCACAF Championships.

== Club career ==
Cascante made his debut for Alajuelense during the 1964 Primera División de Costa Rica on 21 April and remained in the club throughout his first two seasons. However, he soon took interest of Salvadoran club Águila after being recommended by Salvadoran photographer Julio Laínez who was residing in Costa Rica at the time. Arriving to San Miguel in 1967, he played alongside other players such as Juan Francisco Barraza, Maquinita Merlos and Juan Ramón Martínez throughout the 1967–68 Primera División de Fútbol Profesional. Despite an incredibly successful season with Águila winning the tournament and by proxy, their first title, Cascante wouldn't see the season till the end as he found himself within Sonsonate following disagreements within the club regarding a Christmas visit to Costa Rica. Playing alongside other players such as Isidro Menéndez, Calín Santos, the club finished third in the 1969 Salvadoran Primera División. Throughout his career with Sonsonante, he would sometimes return to Costa Rica to play for Cartaginés. He remained with Sonsonante until the aftermath of the 1970 Salvadoran Primera División as he soon returned to Costa Rica to play for Herediano.

Throughout his career with Herediano, he formed a midfielding duo with Alejandro Cabrales as he immediately was a part of the club's starting XI. His biggest success would be through the club nearly winning the 1972 Copa Fraternidad, missing the title out by just a single point against Saprissa. The following 1973 Primera División de Costa Rica saw Cascante be briefly loaned out to Saprissa throughout the first half of the season before returning to Herediano as Saprissa would win another title in a successful decade for them. Trouble came before the 1974 Primera División de Costa Rica as he almost signed with Guatemalan club Comunicaciones following club disagreements. However, after the arrival of manager Orlando de León and negociations, chose to remain with Herediano throughout the earlier portion of the season. Despite this initial renegotiation, he soon found himself playing for Cartaginés once again throughout the remainder of the season. Following a brief tenure with Uruguay de Coronado for two seasons, he spent the remainder of his career with San Miguel. He retired following the 1981 Primera División de Costa Rica as he was considered one of the best Costa Rican footballers of his era.

== International career ==
Cascante was first called up to represent Costa Rica in a friendly against El Salvador on 14 September 1969 that ended in a 2–1 loss. However, he had far more success in the 1969 CONCACAF Championship later that year as during the opening 3–0 victory against Jamaica, he scored the very first goal of the tournament at the first minute. This success was later repeated in the 3–1 victory over the Netherlands Antilles, scoring the 2nd goal of the match as he played in all 5 games of the tournament as well as contributing to Ticos achieving their second title. He also played in the following 1971 CONCACAF Championship where despite making perfect attendance throughout all five games, he wouldn't score another goal as Costa Rica ended up in third place.

== Later life ==
Before his retirement from football, he already started a career as a security agent before transitioning to becoming a pensioner. He currently lives with his wife Arelys and his grandchildren as he occasionally visits to the United States to visit his daughter and brother.
