= George Romano =

Trinidadian footballer (1950–2026)

Personal information
- Full name: George Suitbert Romano
- Date of birth: 1 March 1950
- Place of birth: Maraval, Port of Spain Trinidad and Tobago
- Date of death: 24 January 2026 (aged 75)
- Height: 1.78 m (5 ft 10 in)
- Position: Defender

Youth career
- Belmont Secondary

Senior career*
Years	Team	Apps	(Gls)
1968–1970	Queen's Park		
1971–1974	New York Hungaria		
1975	New York Apollo		

International career
1969–1970	Trinidad and Tobago	2	(0)
- * Club domestic league appearances and goals

George Suitbert Romano (1 March 1950 – 24 January 2026) was a Trinidadian football player and assistant coach. Nicknamed "D Mule", he played as a defender for Queen's Park throughout the late 1960s and early 1970s. He also represented his native Trinidad and Tobago for the 1969 CONCACAF Championship.

== Club career ==
Born as the 11th child in a family of 12, Romano began his footballing career within Belmont Secondary School within the Colleges Football League in 1967. Despite being inspired by footballers such as Charlie Spooner in his defensive plays, he instead took up more defensive plays, often catching the opposing defense off-guard to score a goal. Forming the defensive formation with Algie Hoyte and Kelvin Lawrence. He notably participated in the 7–0 beating of Presentation in the following 1968 season. The 1970 season saw his fellow Belmont teammates Gregory Trujillo and Gordon Husbands to play in Queen's Park. Despite this, Romano chose to emigrate to the United States in 1971, beginning to play for New York Hungaria for the next four years within the semi-professional Cosmopolitan Soccer League until returning to professional football with the New York Apollo in their 1975 season within the American Soccer League. However, his career would abruptly end after facing an injury in his left knee that was so severe that the surgery would prevent him from playing football.

== International career ==
For the upcoming 1969 CONCACAF Championship, Romano was included within a preliminary list of 34 players before making the final squad to travel to Costa Rica with him and Leo Brewster being the youngest players within the squad. Despite ending the tournament in 5th place, Romano had made an impression within Trinidad and Tobago as he was included in the team to play in several friendlies against Guyana and Suriname in a trinational tour. However, his international career with the Soca Warriors would end after returning from his trip in Suriname with cartilage problems in his right knee.

== Later life ==
Following his retirement, Romano later emigrated to the United States to serve as a manager within the New Jersey State Youth Soccer Association. He soon returned to Trinidad as an assistant coach Central alongside manager Terry Fenwick in 2014. However, Romano later suffered a stroke in 2015, forcing him to temporarily withdraw activities form the club for a while. Romano later died on 24 January 2026.
