= Vester Constantine =

Jamaican footballer (died 2015)

Personal information
- Full name: Hugh-Vester Frank Constantine
- Place of birth: Grenada
- Date of death: 7 February 2015
- Place of death: Montego Bay, Jamaica
- Position: Goalkeeper

Senior career*
Years	Team	Apps	(Gls)
1966–1970	Jamaica Defence Force		
1970–1974	Cavalier		

International career
1967–1971	Jamaica		
- * Club domestic league appearances and goals

Hugh-Vester Frank Constantine (died 7 February 2015) was a footballer who played as a goalkeeper. Born in Grenada, he represented the Jamaica national team, and is considered one of the best Jamaican goalkeepers of all time.

== Early life and career ==
Constantine was born in Grenada, but arrived in Jamaica during the 1960s as part of the West India Regiment. He played football for the Jamaica Defence Force and Cavalier, as well as cricket as a bowler for the Jamaica Defence Force during the late 1960s and early 1970s.

He later gained Jamaican citizenship, and represented the Jamaica national team, which he captained. He also represented a Caribbean All Stars XI, as well as a CONCACAF XI at the Brazil Independence Cup in 1972.

== Death ==
Constantine died in Montego Bay on 7 February 2015.
