= Gwenwyn Cust =

Trinidadian footballer (1941–2015)

Personal information
- Full name: Gwenwyn Dalrymple Cust
- Date of birth: 17 August 1941
- Place of birth: Belmont, Port of Spain, Trinidad and Tobago
- Date of death: 21 December 2015 (aged 74)
- Place of death: Belmont, Port of Spain, Trinidad and Tobago
- Position: Forward

Youth career
- Morvant Anglican School

Senior career*
Years	Team	Apps	(Gls)
c. 1969–1970	Belmont Colts		

International career
1969	Trinidad and Tobago	3	(0)
- * Club domestic league appearances and goals

Gwenwyn Dalrymple Cust (17 August 1941 – 21 December 2015) was a Trinidadian footballer. He played as a forward for the Belmont Colts throughout the 1960s and early 1970s. He also represented Trinidad and Tobago for the 1969 CONCACAF Championship.

== Club career ==
Cust began his career within Morvant Anglican School, becoming one of the best players to emerge from the school. He continued to remain in his home neighborhood throughout his senior career, playing for the Belmont Colts.

== International career ==
Cust was called up to represent Trinidad and Tobago for the 1969 CONCACAF Championship in the 1–3 loss against Netherlands Antilles on 2 December 1969. He later played in the loss against Costa Rica and the 0–0 draw against Mexico.

== Later life ==
Cust remained active within the Colts, being one of the hosts for a reunion event for former players that played for Shamrock, Luton Town and the Belmont Dynamos in 2009. He was also married to his wife, Keren. Throughout his later life, he served as the vice president of the Veteran Footballers Foundation of Trinidad and Tobago.

He died on 21 December 2015 after a long battle against cancer.
