= Geoffrey Maxwell =

Jamaican football manager (died 2025)

Personal information
- Place of birth: Jamaica
- Date of death: 22 February 2025
- Position: Defender

International career
Years	Team	Apps	(Gls)
	Jamaica	2+	

Managerial career
- 1988–1990: Jamaica

Geoffrey Maxwell (died 22 February 2025) was a Jamaican football defender and manager.

== Playing career ==
Maxwell played for the Jamaica national football team.

== Managerial career ==
Maxwell managed Jamaican side Waterhouse, helping the club win the league. He was described as having "created history as the first man to have actually coached in the Manning Cup and the daCosta Cup competitions in the same season, while both teams are still actively engaged in the competitions".

=== Style of play ===
Maxwell used a 5-3-2 formation as his main formation.

== Personal life and death ==
Maxwell worked as an accountant.

Maxwell died of complications from Alzheimer's disease on 22 February 2025.
