= Nelson Melgar =

Guatemalan footballer

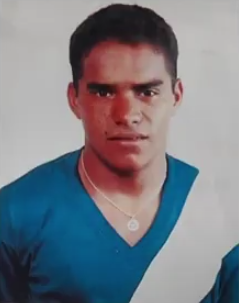

Personal information
- Full name: Nelson Armando Melgar
- Date of birth: 22 July 1945 (age 81)
- Place of birth: Guatemala City, Guatemala

Senior career*
Years	Team	Apps	(Gls)
1965-1975	Communicaciones		
1975-1976	USAC		

International career
	Guatemala	20	(4)
Medal record
Men's football
Representing Guatemala
CONCACAF Championship
Winner	1967 Honduras
Runner-up	1969 Costa Rica
- * Club domestic league appearances and goals

Nelson Armando Melgar (born 22 July 1945) is a Guatemalan footballer. He represented Guatemala in the men's tournament at the 1968 Summer Olympics.

== Honours ==
Guatemala

- CONCACAF Championship: 1967; Runner-up, 1969
