= José Álvarez (footballer) =

Mexican footballer (born 1945)

Personal information
- Full name: José Álvarez Crespo
- Date of birth: 10 May 1945 (age 81)
- Place of birth: Mexico City
- Position: Forward

Senior career*
Years	Team	Apps	(Gls)
1966–1971	Nuevo León		

International career
1968–1969	Mexico	7	(3)
- * Club domestic league appearances and goals

José Álvarez Crespo (born 10 May 1945) is a Mexican former footballer who competed in the 1968 Summer Olympics.
