= Noel Valladares =

Honduran footballer (born 1977)

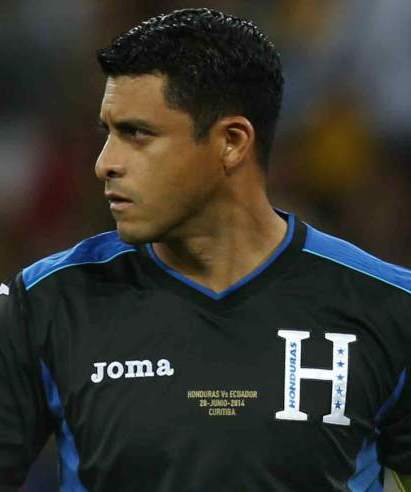
- Valladares with Honduras at the 2014 FIFA World Cup

Personal information
- Full name: Noel Eduardo Valladares Bonilla
- Date of birth: 3 May 1977 (age 49)
- Place of birth: Comayagua, Honduras
- Height: 1.79 m (5 ft 10 1/2 in)
- Position: Goalkeeper

Senior career*
Years	Team	Apps	(Gls)
1996–2005	Motagua	368	(3)
2005–2016	Olimpia	427	(0)
Total		795	(3)

International career
2000–2016	Honduras	135	(0)
- * Club domestic league appearances and goals

Noel Eduardo Valladares Bonilla (born 3 May 1977) is a Honduran former professional footballer who played as a goalkeeper.

Valladares is Honduras' third most capped footballer of all time, after Amado Guevara and Maynor Figueroa.

== Club career ==
Valladares started his career at local club Real Comayagua, and made his professional debut in 1997 with F.C. Motagua. In 2003, as a third-choice keeper{Clarify} at Motagua he entered as a striker in an injury-plagued derby with Olimpia. He scored a header and played few more games as a striker before returning into goalkeeper duties with Motagua and then Olimpia.

After for so many years playing for Olimpia, on 7 November 2016 he announced that he would officially end his career, then after losing to Motagua in the semifinals of the Apertura 2016 on 4 December 2016, he officially retired from playing after 19 years since he began his career with Motagua in 1997.

== International career ==
He was a member of the national squad at the 2000 Summer Olympics in Sydney. Prior to that experience he played as goalkeeper and forward for Honduras at the 1999 Pan American Games in Winnipeg.

Valladares made his senior debut for Honduras in a June 2000 FIFA World Cup qualification match against Haiti and has, as of February 2013, earned a total of 135 caps, scoring no goals. He has represented his country in 46 FIFA World Cup qualification matches and played in all three matches at the 2010 FIFA World Cup. He played at the 2009 and 2011 UNCAF Nations Cups as well as at the 2011 CONCACAF Gold Cup and the 2001 Copa América.

Valladares has been the first-choice goalkeeper for his country for over 10 years and became the third Honduran to reach a century of caps, after record cap Amado Guevara and Honduras' top goalscorer of all time Carlos Pavón. He was an instrumental figure behind Honduras's qualifying run to the 2010 FIFA World Cup finals and played in all three games in South Africa, conceding 3 goals against Chile (0–1) and Spain (0–2) before keeping a clean sheet and earning the Man of the Match award in the team's final game, against Switzerland.

His nickname in the Honduras squad is The Secret due to his shy personality away from the field. In 2010, he succeeded Amado Guevara as the captain of the Honduras national football team.

In 2011, he won the award for "Best Goalkeeper in the 2011 CONCACAF Gold Cup." In the same tournament he won the award for the 3rd as well as the 4th best save.

== Honours ==
=== Club ===
C.D. Olimpia

- Liga Profesional de Honduras (9): 2005–06 A, 2005–06 C, 2007–08 C, 2008–09 C, 2009–10 C, 2011–12 A, 2011–12 C, 2012–13 A, 2012–13 C

F.C. Motagua

- Liga Profesional de Honduras (5): 1997–98 A, 1997–98 C, 1999–00 A, 1999–00 C, 2001–02 A
- Honduran Super Cup (1): 1997–98

=== International ===
Honduras

- Copa Centroamericana (1): 2011
- CONCACAF Men's Olympic Qualifying Tournament (1): 2000

=== Individual ===
- Best Goalkeeper Award of CONCACAF Gold Cup (1): 2011
- CONCACAF Gold Cup Best Save: 2011 (3rd and 4th place)
- Man of The Match in 2010 FIFA World Cup vs. Switzerland
- Best Goalkeeper Award of Liga Profesional de Honduras (3): 2006–07 C, 2007–08 A, 2007–08 C

== See also ==
- List of men's footballers with 100 or more international caps
