= 1969 CONCACAF Championship =

Campeonato de Naciones de CONCACAF 1969

Tournament details
- Host country: Costa Rica
- Dates: 23 November – 7 December
- Teams: 6 (from 1 confederation)
- Venue: 1 (in 1 host city)

Final positions
- Champions: Costa Rica (2nd title)
- Runners-up: Guatemala
- Third place: Netherlands Antilles
- Fourth place: Mexico

Tournament statistics
- Matches played: 15
- Goals scored: 43 (2.87 per match)
- Top scorer(s): (Costa Rica) Víctor Ruiz (4 goals)

The 1969 CONCACAF Championship was the fourth edition of the CONCACAF Championship, the football championship of North America, Central America and the Caribbean (CONCACAF). The tournament was held between 23 November to 8 December. Six teams participated in the tournament playing in the round-robin format to determine the winner. A late application by Haiti was rejected.

The event was hosted by Costa Rica in the city of San José. The tournament was won by the host nation, for the second time after 1963, by tying defending champions Guatemala 1–1 in the deciding final match. Mexico used players from a second-level league.

== Qualifying tournament ==
1969 CONCACAF Championship qualification

== Teams ==
- Costa Rica (Hosts)
- Guatemala (Defending Champions)
- Jamaica
- Mexico
- Netherlands Antilles
- Trinidad and Tobago

== Venue ==
San José
Estadio Nacional
Capacity: 25,000
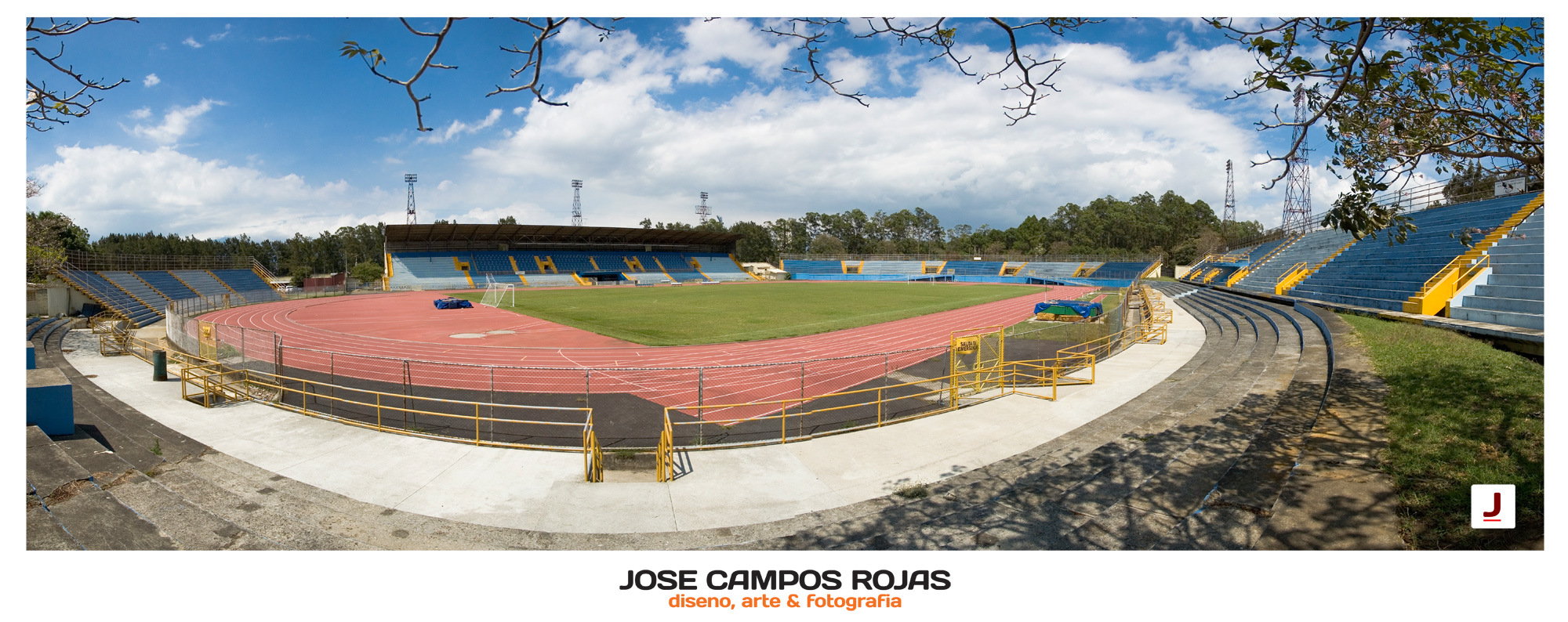

== Final tournament ==
Pos	Team	Pld	W	D	L	GF	GA	GD	Pts
1	Costa Rica	5	4	1	0	13	2	+11	9
2	Guatemala	5	3	2	0	10	2	+8	8
3	Netherlands Antilles	5	2	1	2	9	12	−3	5
4	Mexico	5	1	2	2	4	5	−1	4
5	Trinidad and Tobago	5	1	1	3	4	12	−8	3
6	Jamaica	5	0	1	4	3	10	−7	1

23 November 1969
10:00

Costa Rica	3–0	Jamaica
Cascante 1'; Sáenz 62'; Dawkins 67' (o.g.)

Estadio Nacional, San José, Costa Rica
Attendance: 7,389

27 November 1969
16:30

Guatemala	2–0	Trinidad and Tobago
Gamboa 8'; Fión 84'

Estadio Nacional, San José, Costa Rica

27 November 1969
18:30

Mexico	2–0	Jamaica
Mancilla 15'; Sabater 83'

Estadio Nacional, San José, Costa Rica

27 November 1969
20:30

Costa Rica	2–1	Netherlands Antilles
Grant 1'; Cascante 75'		Croes 30'

Estadio Nacional, San José, Costa Rica

29 November 1969
20:15

Guatemala	6–1	Netherlands Antilles
Melgar 4', 82'; Salamanca 24', 49'; Valdez 32'; Meulens 54' (o.g.)		Regales 22'

Estadio Nacional, San José, Costa Rica
Attendance: 1,309
Referee: Theophilus Joseph (Trinidad and Tobago)

30 November 1969
8:15

Trinidad and Tobago	3–2	Jamaica
Cummings 33'; Douglas 40'; Haynes 49'		Scott 20'; Hamilton 31'

Estadio Nacional, San José, Costa Rica
Referee: Jorge Mendez Montes De Oca (Guatemala)

30 November 1969
10:45

Costa Rica	2–0	Mexico
Grant 4'; Sáenz 33'

Estadio Nacional, San José, Costa Rica
Referee: Henry Landauer (United States)

2 December 1969
18:15

Netherlands Antilles	3–1	Trinidad and Tobago
Loefstok 11', 49'; Martijn 65'		Haynes 4'

Estadio Nacional, San José, Costa Rica
Referee: Luis Paulino Siles Calderón (Costa Rica)

2 December 1969
20:15

Guatemala	1–0	Mexico
Fión 46'

Estadio Nacional, San José, Costa Rica
Referee: Theodorus Koetsier (Netherlands Antilles)

4 December 1969
16:30

Mexico	2–2	Netherlands Antilles
Álvarez 69'; Barba 71'		Toppenberg 42', 65'

Estadio Nacional, San José, Costa Rica
Attendance: 10,234
Referee: Juan Soto Paris (Costa Rica)

4 December 1969
18:30

Guatemala	0–0	Jamaica

Estadio Nacional, San José, Costa Rica
Attendance: 10,234
Referee: Diego Di Leo (Mexico)

4 December 1969
20:30

Costa Rica	5–0	Trinidad and Tobago
Ruiz 10', 59', 65', 75'; Elizondo 88' (pen.)	Report

Estadio Nacional, San José, Costa Rica
Attendance: 10,234
Referee: Kenneth Adolfus Chaplin (Jamaica)

6 December 1969
20:15

Netherlands Antilles	2–1	Jamaica
Regales 6'; Martis 48'		Largie 50'

Estadio Nacional, San José, Costa Rica
Attendance: 170
Referee: Luis Paulino Siles Calderón (Costa Rica)

7 December 1969
8:45

Mexico	0–0	Trinidad and Tobago

Estadio Nacional, San José, Costa Rica

7 December 1969
10:45

Costa Rica	1–1	Guatemala
Vaughns 50'		Fión 7'

Estadio Nacional, San José, Costa Rica
Referee: Toros Kibritjian (USA)

== Awards ==
1969 CONCACAF
Championship winners

Costa Rica
Second title

== Scorers ==
4 goals

- (Costa Rica) Víctor Ruiz

3 goals

- (Guatemala) Nelson Melgar
- (Guatemala) Marco Fión

2 goals

- (Costa Rica) Álvaro Cascante
- (Costa Rica) Roy Sáenz
- (Costa Rica) Jaime Grant
- (Netherlands Antilles) Carlos Regales
- (Netherlands Antilles) Melvin Loefstok
- (Netherlands Antilles) Wilbert Martijn
- (Netherlands Antilles) Adelbert Toppenberg
- (Trinidad and Tobago) Ulric Haynes

1 goal

- (Costa Rica) Carlos Santana
- (Costa Rica) Wálter Elizondo
- (Costa Rica) Wally Vaughns
- (Costa Rica) Vicente Wanchope
- (Guatemala) Tomás Gamboa
- (Guatemala) Daniel Salamanca
- (Guatemala) Rolando Valdez
- (Netherlands Antilles) Edgar Meulens
- (Netherlands Antilles) Ismael Croes
- (Mexico) Francisco Mancilla
- (Mexico) Alfonso Sabater
- (Mexico) José Crespo
- (Mexico) Leopoldo Barba
- (Trinidad and Tobago) Everald Cummings
- (Trinidad and Tobago) Keith Douglas
- (Jamaica) Delroy Scott
- (Jamaica) Joshua Hamilton
- (Jamaica) David Largie

Own goals

- (Jamaica) Edwin Dawkins (for Costa Rica)

== Team of the Tournament ==
Ideal XI by RSSSF
Goalkeeper	Defenders	Midfielders	Forwards
(Costa Rica) Rodolfo Umaña	(Netherlands Antilles) Erwin Melfor (Guatemala) Horacio Hasse (Costa Rica) Walter Elizondo	(Costa Rica) Jaime Grant (Netherlands Antilles) Ronald Martis	(Costa Rica) Roy Sáenz (Guatemala) Marco Fión (Costa Rica) Víctor Ruiz (Netherlands Antilles) Carlos Regales (Guatemala) Nelson Melgar
