= Clausura 2017 Copa MX final =

- Event: Clausura 2017 Copa MX
Guadalajara	Morelia
0	0
- Guadalajara won 3–1 on penalty kicks
- Date: 19 April 2017
- Venue: Estadio Chivas, Zapopan, Jalisco
- Referee: Fernando Hernandez
- Attendance: 42,329

The Clausura 2017 Copa MX final was the final of the Clausura 2017 Copa MX, the tenth edition of the Copa MX under its current format and 77th overall organized by the Mexican Football Federation, the governing body of association football in Mexico.

The final was contested in a single leg format between Liga MX clubs Guadalajara and Morelia. The match was hosted by Guadalajara at Estadio Chivas in the Guadalajara suburb of Zapopan on 19 April 2017. As winners, Guadalajara earned a spot to face Querétaro (the winners of the Apertura 2016 edition) in the 2017 Supercopa MX.

== Qualified teams ==
Team	Previous finals appearances (bold indicates winners)
Guadalajara	11 (1948, 1951, 1952, 1954, 1955, **1963**, 1967, **1970**, Clausura 2015, **Apertura 2015**, Apertura 2016)
Morelia	2 (1965, **Apertura 2013**)

== Venue ==
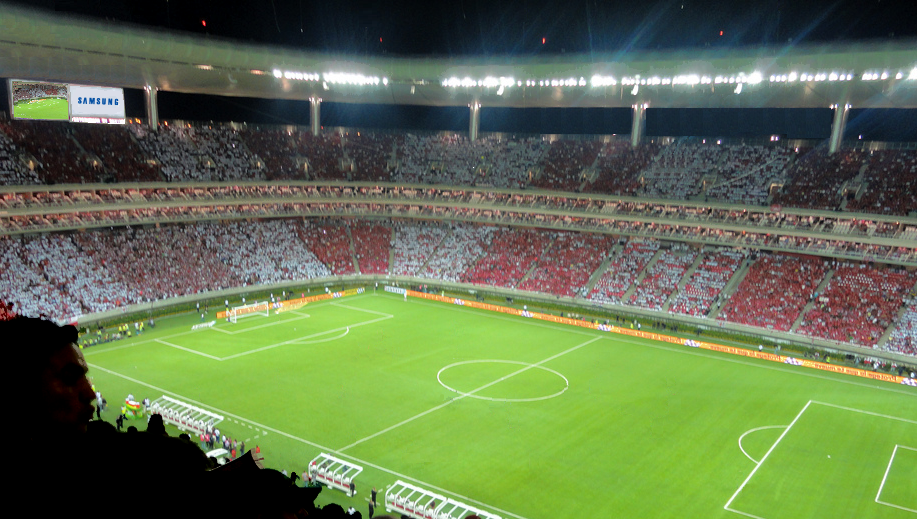
Estadio Chivas hosted the final

Due to the tournament's regulations the higher seed among both finalists during the group stage will host the final, thus Estadio Chivas hosted the final. Formerly named Estadio Omnilife, the venue has been home to Guadalajara since the Apertura 2010 season. The venue has hosted various other events such as the first leg of the 2010 Copa Libertadores Finals between Guadalajara and Brazilian club Internacional. The stadium also hosted eight matches of the 2011 FIFA U-17 World Cup, including the semifinal between Brazil and Uruguay. The stadium hosted the 2011 Pan American Games opening and closing ceremonies as well as both men's and women's football tournaments.

== Background ==
Guadalajara has won the tournament three times while Morelia has won it once. This is Guadalajara's fourth Copa MX final in a two-year span, the last appearance being in the previous edition where they lost to Querétaro on penalty kicks. Morelia most recently reached the final in the Apertura 2013 where the defeated Atlas on penalty kicks to win their first Copa MX title.

Guadalajara won three, drew once and scored six goals during group stage and won their group. They eliminated UAT in the Round of 16, Juárez in the quarterfinals, and Monterrey in the semifinals.

Morelia won two, lost two, and scored six goals during group stage, as they ended second. They eliminated Toluca in the Round of 16, Tijuana in the quarterfinals and Cruz Azul in the semifinals.

== Road to the finals ==
Note: In all results below, the score of the finalist is given first.

Guadalajara		Round	Morelia	
Opponent	Result	Group stage	Opponent	Result
Atlante	1–1 (H)	Matchday 1	León	0–3 (A)
Venados	1–0 (A)	Matchday 2	Zacatepec	1–0 (H)
Venados	1–0 (H)	Matchday 3	Zacatepec	3–1 (A)
Atlante	3–1 (A)	Matchday 4	León	2–3 (H)
**Group 6 winners**: Pos / Team / Pld / Pts; **1** / Guadalajara / **4** / **10**; 2 / Atlante / 4 / **5**; 3 / Venados / 4 / **1**; Source: Liga MX		Final standings	**Group 9 runners-up**: Pos / Team / Pld / Pts; 1 / León / 4 / **12**; **2** / Morelia / **4** / **6**; 3 / Zacatepec / 4 / **0**; Source: Liga MX	
Opponent	Result	Knockout stage	Opponent	Result
UAT	2–2 (6–5) p) (H)	Round of 16	Toluca	2–2 (3–0 p) (A)
Juárez	3–2 (H)	Quarterfinals	Tijuana	2–0 (A)
Monterrey	2–0 (A)	Semifinals	Cruz Azul	1–0 (H)

== Match ==
19 April 2017
21:06

Guadalajara	0–0	Morelia
	Report
Penalties
Salcido (penalty missed); Marín (penalty scored); Pulido (penalty scored); Pineda (penalty scored)	3–1	(penalty scored) Osuna; (penalty missed) Zárate; (penalty missed) Cabrera; (penalty missed) Rey

Estadio Chivas, Zapopan
Attendance: 42,329
Referee: Fernando Hernández

**Guadalajara**	**Morelia**

GK	34	(Mexico) Miguel Jiménez
DF	16	(Mexico) Miguel Ángel Ponce
DF	3	(Mexico) Carlos Salcido (c)
DF	5	(Mexico) Hedgardo Marín
DF	17	(Mexico) Jesús Sánchez
MF	7	(Mexico) Orbelín Pineda
MF	25	(Mexico) Michael Pérez
MF	21	(Mexico) Carlos Fierro
MF	18	(Mexico) Néstor Calderón	(substituted off) 63'
FW	9	(Mexico) Alan Pulido
FW	14	(Mexico) Ángel Zaldívar	(substituted off) 39'
Substitutions:
GK	30	(Mexico) Rodolfo Cota
DF	6	(Mexico) Edwin Hernández
DF	28	(Mexico) Miguel Basulto
MF	20	(Mexico) Rodolfo Pizarro	(substituted on) 39'
MF	23	(Mexico) José Juan Vázquez
FW	10	(Mexico) Eduardo López	(substituted on) 63'
FW	97	(Mexico) Michelle Benítez
Manager:
(Argentina) Matías Almeyda

GK	13	(Uruguay) Sebastián Sosa
DF	28	(Mexico) Carlos Adrián Morales
DF	3	(Mexico) Gerardo Rodríguez
DF	5	(Argentina) Facundo Erpen
DF	30	(Mexico) Ignacio González
MF	8	(Mexico) Juan Pablo Rodríguez (c)		(substituted off) 73'
MF	6	(Mexico) David Cabrera
MF	25	(Mexico) Mario Osuna
MF	14	(Ecuador) Cristian Penilla	(yellow card) 18'	(substituted off) 80'
FW	31	(Argentina) Gastón Lezcano
FW	27	(Mexico) Miguel Sansores		(substituted off) 65'
Substitutions:
GK	35	(Mexico) Luis Malagón
DF	16	(Mexico) Eduardo Chávez
DF	29	(Mexico) Santiago Altamira
MF	7	(Mexico) Diego Mejía
MF	11	(Mexico) Jorge Zárate		(substituted on) 73'
FW	12	(Mexico) Rodolfo Vilchis		(substituted on) 65'
FW	18	(Colombia) Luis Gabriel Rey		(substituted on) 80'
Manager:
(Mexico) Roberto Hernández

Assistant referees:
Miguel Angel Chua
Michel Alejandro Morales
Fourth official:
Diego Montaño

== Broadcasters ==
The match was not shown on any over-the-air or pay television networks in Mexico, instead it was shown on Chivas TV, Guadalajara's over-the-top (OTT) platform. Along with Chivas TV, the match was also streamed on Claro Video and Cinépolis Klic. On 12 April 2017, cinema chain Cinépolis announced the match will be shown in Cinépolis theaters across Mexico.

The match was shown on Univision Deportes Network in the United States.
