= List of Toluca FC records and statistics =

Mexican football club statistics

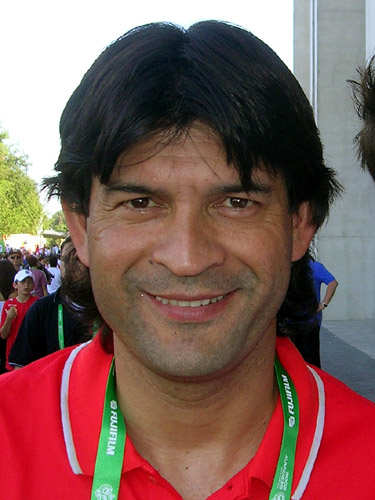
José Saturnino Cardozo, Toluca's all-time leading scorer with 258 goals.

Toluca FC is a Mexican professional football club based in Toluca, State of Mexico, competing in Liga MX, Mexico's top division. The club is one of the most successful in Mexican football, having won twelve Liga MX titles, the second highest total in the competition's history, along with two Copa MX titles, five Campeón de Campeones, and three CONCACAF Champions Cup titles. Nine Toluca players have finished as the Liga MX top scorer on sixteen occasions, more than any other club in Liga MX history, with José Saturnino Cardozo leading the distinction with four top scorer titles in the league and also holding the club record of 258 goals. Toluca players have also claimed top scorer titles in the Liga MX playoffs, the Copa MX, and the CONCACAF Champions Cup.

== Honours ==
Toluca FC is a professional football club competing in Liga MX, Mexico's top division, and one of the most successful clubs in Mexican football with 24 official titles across multiple domestic and international competitions.

=== Domestic ===
In domestic football, Toluca has twelve Liga MX titles, ranking second among all Mexican clubs behind América and level with Guadalajara, along with two Copa MX titles, and five Campeón de Campeones. In the second division, the club finished as runners-up in the Copa MX equivalent before winning the title that secured their promotion to the top flight in 1953, from which they have never been relegated.

The club has experienced three dominant periods in domestic football: the mid-to-late 1960s, when Toluca won back-to-back league and cup titles under Ignacio Trelles; the late 1990s and early 2000s, when the club claimed four league titles under Enrique Meza and subsequent coaches; and the mid-2020s, when Toluca again won consecutive league titles and multiple cups under Antonio Mohamed.

Type	Competition	Titles	Winning years	Runners-up	Source
Top-tier division	Primera División/Liga MX	12	1966–67, 1967–68, 1974–75, Verano 1998, Verano 1999, Verano 2000, Apertura 2002, Apertura 2005, Apertura 2008, Bicentenario 2010, Clausura 2025, Apertura 2025	1956–57, 1957–58, 1970–71, Invierno 2000, Apertura 2006, Apertura 2012, Clausura 2018, Apertura 2022	
Top-tier division	Copa México/Copa MX	2	1955–56, 1988–89	1960–61, Clausura 2018	
Top-tier division	Campeón de Campeones	5	1967, 1968, 2003, 2006, 2025	1956, 1975, 1989, 2026	
Second-tier division	Segunda División	1	1952–53	—	
Second-tier division	Copa México de la Segunda División	0	—	1951–52	
Second-tier division	Campeón de Campeones de la Segunda División	1	1953	—	

=== International ===
Toluca won their first international title with the 1968 CONCACAF Champions' Cup, claimed without playing a final after the other two semi-finalists were disqualified from the competition, leaving Toluca to be declared champions by default. The title earned them qualification to the Copa Interamericana, a former tournament contested between the winners of the CONCACAF Champions' Cup and the Copa Libertadores.

In the 1969 Copa Interamericana, the cup's first edition, Toluca faced the 1968 Copa Libertadores champions Estudiantes de La Plata of Argentina. After losing the first leg and winning the second one, both teams tied on aggregate before going to a third leg where Estudiantes defeated Toluca to claim the title. Toluca has also won the CONCACAF Champions' Cup in 2003 and 2026, and have finished runners-up on four occasions.

Type	Competition	Titles	Winning years	Runners-up	Source
Intercontinental CONCACAF–CONMEBOL	Copa Interamericana	0	—	1969	
Continental CONCACAF	CONCACAF Champions Cup/Champions League	3	1968, 2003, 2026	1998, 2006, 2013–14	
Regional North America CONCACAF USSF–FMF	Leagues Cup	1	2026	—	

=== Subregional ===
The Campeones Cup is a match contested between the MLS Cup champion and the winner of the Campeón de Campeones, an annual match between that season's two Liga MX tournament champions. Toluca competed in its 2025 edition, having won the 2025 Campeón de Campeones. In the 2025 Campeones Cup, they faced the LA Galaxy, winners of the 2024 MLS Cup, whom they defeated 2–3.

Type	Competition	Titles	Winning years	Runners-up	Source
North America MLS Liga MX	Campeones Cup	1	2025	—	

== Top goalscorers ==
=== Club ===
Toluca's all-time leading scorer is Paraguayan forward José Saturnino Cardozo, who played for the club from 1994 to 2005, scoring 258 goals in total. Of these, 249 came in Liga MX competition, comprising 206 in the regular season and 43 in the liguilla (playoffs). Cardozo ranks among the top five scorers in Liga MX history. Cardozo is followed by Mexican forward Vicente Pereda, who spent his entire career at Toluca from 1960 to 1977, scoring 119 goals.

The third top goalscorer is Uruguayan forward Vicente Sánchez, who played alongside Cardozo. Sánchez played from 2001 to 2008 in Toluca and scored 98 goals. Mexican forward José Manuel Abundis, who also played alongside Cardozo, is the fourth top goalscorer with 84 goals. He is tied in fourth place with 84 goals with Uruguayan forward Carlos María Morales.

The fifth all-time leading scorer for Toluca is Mexican forward Carlos Carús, who scored 77 goals for the club between 1953 and 1963. He is followed by Sinha, a Brazilian-born Mexican midfielder who served as a playmaker, with 71 goals. Sinha joined Toluca in 1999 and spent about 15 years with the club. Next is Chilean forward Héctor Mancilla, who scored 64 goals during his time at the club from 2008 to 2010.

The only active player in the top ten is Portuguese forward Paulinho, who joined Toluca in 2024 and has scored 62 goals as of May 2026, He is level with Uruguayan midfielder Juan Carlos Paz, who scored 62 goals for the club between 1978 and 1986, and Uruguayan forward Héctor Hugo Eugui, who also scored 62 goals after joining the club in 1972.

Note: Players in bold are active in Toluca. This list is updated as of May 2026.

Top goalscorers for Toluca
Rank	Player	Total goals
1	(Paraguay) José Saturnino Cardozo	258
2	(Mexico) Vicente Pereda	119 (Note: According to RSSSF, Toluca player Vicente Pereda scored 119 goals for the team in Liga MX, not including five goals scored in the Copa MX. Other sources place his total at 129 goals.)
3	(Uruguay) Vicente Sánchez	98
4	(Mexico) José Manuel Abundis	84 (Note: Another source places José Manuel Abundis's goal tally at 82.)
4	(Uruguay) Carlos María Morales	84 (Note: Another source places Carlos María Morales's goal tally at 77.)
5	(Mexico) Carlos Carús	77
6	(Mexico) Sinha	71
7	(Argentina) Héctor Mancilla	64
8	(Portugal) **Paulinho**	62
9	(Uruguay) Juan Carlos Paz	62
9	(Uruguay) Héctor Hugo Eugui	62

=== Liga MX ===
Since the team's Liga MX debut in 1953, nine Toluca players have finished as the league's top scorer in a season, some on multiple occasions, giving the club more individual top scorer titles than any other in Liga MX history with sixteen.

Prior to 1996, the Mexican football league season was contested as a single annual tournament known as the torneo largo (long tournament). From 1996, the format was restructured into two shorter seasonal tournaments known as the torneos cortos (short tournaments), each concluded by a liguilla (playoff). Amaury Epaminondas, the top scorer in the 1966–67 season with 21 goals, and Vicente Pereda, the top scorer in the 1969–70 season with 20 goals, both played under the former format.

Cardozo leads this distinction for Toluca, having finished as the league's top scorer on four occasions. He also holds the highest single-season scoring record in Liga MX history since the introduction of the torneos cortos format, with 29 goals in the regular season. Including his seven playoff goals, his total of 36 across the tournament also remains unmatched.

Player	Nationality	Season edition	Season goals	Playoff goals	Total goals	Source
Amaury Epaminondas	Brazil	1966–67	21	–	21	
Vicente Pereda	Mexico	1969–70	20	–	20	
José Saturnino Cardozo	Paraguay	Verano 1998	13	5	18	
José Saturnino Cardozo	Paraguay	Verano 1999	15	5	20	
José Saturnino Cardozo	Paraguay	Apertura 2002	29	7	36	
José Saturnino Cardozo	Paraguay	Clausura 2003	21	1	22	
Bruno Marioni	Argentina	Apertura 2006	11	4	15	
Héctor Mancilla	Chile	Apertura 2008	11	2	13	
Héctor Mancilla	Chile	Clausura 2009	14	0	14	
Iván Alonso	Uruguay	Apertura 2011	11	0	11	
Iván Alonso	Uruguay	Clausura 2012	14	0	14	
Pablo Velázquez	Paraguay	Apertura 2013	12	1	13	
Alexis Canelo	Argentina	Guard1anes 2021	11	3	14	
Paulinho	Portugal	Apertura 2024	13	0	13	
Paulinho	Portugal	Clausura 2025	12	2	14	
Paulinho	Portugal	Apertura 2025	12	3	15	

=== Playoffs ===
In the liguilla (playoffs) of the Mexican seasonal tournaments, several Toluca players have finished as the top scorer on multiple occasions. Cardozo leads this distinction, having finished as the playoff top scorer six times.

Note: This list is updated as of July 2025

Player	Nationality	Playoff edition	Total goals	Source
Ricardo Brandon	Uruguay	1978–1979	4	
José Saturnino Cardozo	Paraguay	Verano 1998	5	
José Saturnino Cardozo	Paraguay	Verano 1999	5	
José Saturnino Cardozo	Paraguay	Verano 2000	8	
Carlos María Morales	Uruguay	Verano 2000	8	
José Saturnino Cardozo	Paraguay	Invierno 2000	8	
José Saturnino Cardozo	Paraguay	Apertura 2002	7	
José Saturnino Cardozo	Paraguay	Apertura 2003	5	
Bruno Marioni	Argentina	Apertura 2006	4	
Héctor Mancilla	Chile	Apertura 2008	2	
Édgar Benítez	Paraguay	Apertura 2012	3	
Fernando Uribe	Colombia	Clausura 2018	5	
Alexis Vega	Mexico	Clausura 2025	4	

=== Copa MX ===
In addition to Liga MX, Toluca holds several records in the Copa MX, a domestic cup contested between Liga MX clubs and those of the Ascenso MX, Mexico's second division, which ran from 1907 to 2020 under various names and with several interruptions. Listed below are the seven top scorers of each Copa MX edition in which a Toluca player finished as the tournament's leading scorer.

Player	Nationality	Cup editions	Total goals	Source
Carlos Carús	Mexico	1960–61	7	
Vicente Pereda	Mexico	1966–67	5	
Francisco Linares	Mexico	1967–68	7	
Jesús Romero Reyes	Mexico	1969–70	4	
Fernando Uribe	Colombia	Apertura 2016	6	
Alexis Canelo	Argentina	Clausura 2018	7	
Kevin Castañeda	Mexico	2019–20	7	

=== CONCACAF Champions Cup ===
In the CONCACAF Champions Cup, an international tournament between clubs in North America, Toluca became the first Mexican club to produce the tournament's top scorer in the 1968 edition, which the club also won. Toluca players have since finished as the tournament's top scorer across multiple editions, including the 2026 edition in which Toluca again claimed the title.

Player	Nationality	Cup editions	Total goals	Source
Amaury Epaminondas	Brazil	1968	3	
Raúl Nava	Mexico	2014	7	
Paulinho	Portugal	2026	8	

=== Segunda División ===
Toluca was among the founding clubs of the Segunda División, Mexico's second-tier division, when it was established in 1950, and won the title in the 1952–53 season to earn promotion to the top flight. That season, a Toluca player also finished as the division's top scorer.

Player	Nationality	Playoff edition	Total goals	Source
Mateo de la Tijera	Mexico	1952–53	22	

== Statistics ==
=== By competition ===
Note: This list covers all-time competition results for each competition, with the information updated of July 2025.

Competition	Pld	W	D	L	GF	GA	GD	Pts	Best result	Source
Liga MX	2,618	1,057	763	798	3,918	3,205	+713	3,390	Champions	
Segunda División	52	25	15	12	124	81	+43	65	Champions	
Copa MX	237	112	60	65	386	294	+92	319	Champions	
Campeón de Campeones	10	5	1	4	12	9	+3	–	Champions	
Leagues Cup	–	–	–	–	–	–	–	–	Champions	
Total	2,994	1,240	856	898	4,670	3,670	+1,000	3,930	23 titles	

== Match and goal records ==
- Record win: 7–0 against Puebla in the Verano 2000 playoffs and against Tigres UANL in the Apertura 2006
- Record defeat: 7–0 against León in the 1973–1974 season
- Liga MX all-time record playoff win: 9–0 against Puebla in a two-leg match in the Verano 2000 playoffs
- Longest winning streak: nine consecutive wins in the Clausura 2018 season
- Longest unbeaten streak (wins and draws): 20 matches across the 1966–67 and 1967–68 seasons and in the 1982–83 season
- Longest streak without a draw: 15 matches in the 1961–62 season
- Longest winless streak: 18 matches in the 1994–95 season
- Longest period without conceding goals: 772 minutes in the Apertura 2008 season
- Tournaments with only one recorded loss: Invierno 1998 and Clausura 2009
- Most goals in a calendar year (1999, 2000, 2002, and 2025): first and only Liga MX club to score 100 or more goals in a single calendar year
