= List of football clubs in Mexico by major honours won =

This is a list of the major honours won by football clubs in Mexico. It lists every Mexican association football club to have won any of the domestic, continental, or intercontinental trophies recognized as major titles by FMF, CONCACAF, CONMEBOL or FIFA.

== Official competitions ==
Key	Competition	Notes
Domestic competitions (FMF)
LMX	Liga MX	The national top professional football league, its professional era began in 1943 as Liga Mayor.
CMX	Copa MX (hiatus)	The national cup tournament, its professional era began in 1942 as Copa México.
CdC	Campeón de Campeones	The national super cup for Liga MX, its professional era began in 1942. Initially, it was contested by the Liga MX and Copa MX champions. Since 2003, it is contested by the Liga MX champions of Apertura and Clausura tournaments.
SMX	Supercopa MX (defunct)	A defunct national super cup contested by the Copa MX champions of Apertura and Clausura tournaments. It was played from 2014 to 2019.
SCLMX	Supercopa de la Liga MX	A national super cup played in 2022 and 2024. Only contested when a club wins automatically the Campeón de Campeones for winning both Liga MX tournaments of the season (Apertura and Clausura).
Regional competitions (MLS–Liga MX)
LC	Leagues Cup	An international regional competition for the North American Zone, contested by clubs from United States, Canada and Mexico. Jointly organized by Major League Soccer (MLS) and Liga MX. Founded in 2019, and recognized by CONCACAF since the 2023 edition as a direct qualification pathway for CONCACAF Champions Cup.
CC	Campeones Cup	An annual soccer match contested between the reigning MLS Cup champion from MLS, representing the United States and Canada, and the CdC winner from Liga MX, representing Mexico
Continental competitions (CONCACAF)
CCC	CONCACAF Champions Cup	The premier international continental club competition in North America, Central America, and the Caribbean, organized by CONCACAF. It was founded in 1962.
CCWC	CONCACAF Cup Winners Cup (defunct)	A defunct international continental club competition organized by CONCACAF. It was played from 1991 to 1998, contested by the champions of the national cup tournaments.
CGC	CONCACAF Giants Cup (defunct)	A defunct international continental club competition organized by CONCACAF. It was played for a single edition in 2001, contested by clubs with larger fan bases.
Continental competitions (CONMEBOL)
CS	CONMEBOL Sudamericana	South America's secondary international continental club competition organized by CONMEBOL. Mexican clubs participated as invitees from 2005 to 2008.
Intercontinental competitions (CONCACAF–CONMEBOL)
CI	Copa Interamericana (defunct)	A defunct intercontinental club trophy organized by CONCACAF and CONMEBOL, contested by the champions of the CONCACAF champions Cup and Copa Libertadores. It was played from 1969 to 1998.
Intercontinental competitions (FIFA)
FCC	FIFA Challenger Cup	A intercontinental secondary trophy organized by FIFA as part of the FIFA Intercontinental Cup, contested by the champions of the African-Asian-Pacific Cup and Derby of the Americas. It was first held in 2024.
FDA	FIFA Derby of the Americas	A secondary intercontinental trophy organized by FIFA as part of the FIFA Intercontinental Cup, contested by the champions of the CONCACAF Champions Cup and CONMEBOL Libertadores. It was first held in 2024.

== Ranking ==
Last updated on 6 September 2026, Toluca won the 2026 Leagues Cup.

Rank	Club	Domestic						Regional (Note: CONCACAF recognized the Leagues Cup since the 2023 edition.)			Continental					Intercontinental				Total	Last trophy
Rank	Club	LMX	CMX	CdC	SMX	SCLMX	Total	LC	CC	Total	CCC	CCWC	CGC	CS	Total	CI	FCC	FDA	Total	Total	Last trophy
1	América	16	6	7	0	1	30	0	1	1	7	0	1	0	8	2	0	0	2	41	Apertura 2024 Liga MX
2	Cruz Azul	10	4	4	1	1	20	0 (Note: The 2019 Leagues Cup was not recognized by CONCACAF.)	0	0	7	0	0	0	7	0	0	0	0	27	2026 Campeón de Campeones
3	Guadalajara	12	4	7	1	0	24	0	0	0	2	0	0	0	2	0	0	0	0	26	2018 CONCACAF Champions League
4	Toluca	12	2	5	0	0	19	1	1	2	3	0	0	0	3	0	0	0	0	24	2026 Leagues Cup
5	León	8	5	5	0	0	18	0 (Note: The 2021 Leagues Cup was not recognized by CONCACAF.)	0	0	1	0	0	0	1	0	0	0	0	19	2023 CONCACAF Champions League
6	Tigres UANL	8	3	4	0	0	15	0	2	2	1	0	0	0	1	0	0	0	0	18	Clausura 2023 Liga MX
7	Pachuca	7	0	0	0	0	7	0	0	0	6	0	0	1	7	0	1	1	2	16	2024 FIFA Challenger Cup
8	Pumas UNAM	7	1	2	0	0	10	0	0	0	3	0	0	0	3	1	0	0	1	14	Clausura 2011 Primera División
8	Monterrey	5	3	0	0	0	8	0	0	0	5	1	0	0	6	0	0	0	0	14	2021 CONCACAF Champions League
10	Necaxa	3	4	2	1	0	10	0	0	0	1	1	0	0	2	0	0	0	0	12	Clausura 2018 Copa MX
10	Atlas	3	4	5	0	0	12	0	0	0	0	0	0	0	0	0	0	0	0	12	2022 Campeón de Campeones
12	Puebla	2	5	1	1	0	9	0	0	0	1	0	0	0	1	0	0	0	0	10	Clausura 2015 Copa MX
13	Santos Laguna	6	1	1	0	0	8	0	0	0	0	0	0	0	0	0	0	0	0	8	Clausura 2018 Liga MX
13	Atlante	3	2	1	0	0	6	0	0	0	2	0	0	0	2	0	0	0	0	8	2008–09 CONCACAF Champions League
15	Zacatepec	2	2	1	0	0	5	0	0	0	0	0	0	0	0	0	0	0	0	5	1958–59 Copa México
16	Real España	1	1	2	0	0	4	0	0	0	0	0	0	0	0	0	0	0	0	4	1945 Campeón de Campeones
16	Veracruz	2	2	0	0	0	4	0	0	0	0	0	0	0	0	0	0	0	0	4	Clausura 2016 Copa MX
18	Moctezuma	0	2	1	0	0	3	0	0	0	0	0	0	0	0	0	0	0	0	3	1947 Campeón de Campeones
18	Marte	1	0	2	0	0	3	0	0	0	0	0	0	0	0	0	0	0	0	3	1954 Campeón de Campeones
18	Tampico	1	1	1	0	0	3	0	0	0	0	0	0	0	0	0	0	0	0	3	1960–61 Copa México
18	Morelia	1	1	0	1	0	3	0	0	0	0	0	0	0	0	0	0	0	0	3	2014 Supercopa MX
22	Oro	1	0	1	0	0	2	0	0	0	0	0	0	0	0	0	0	0	0	2	1963 Campeón de Campeones
22	Tecos	1	0	0	0	0	1	0	0	0	0	1	0	0	1	0	0	0	0	2	1995 CONCACAF Cup Winners Cup
22	Leones Negros UdeG	0	1	0	0	0	1	0	0	0	1	0	0	0	1	0	0	0	0	2	1990–91 Copa México
22	Querétaro	0	1	0	1	0	2	0	0	0	0	0	0	0	0	0	0	0	0	2	2017 Supercopa MX
26	Atlético Español	0	0	0	0	0	0	0	0	0	1	0	0	0	1	0	0	0	0	1	1975 CONCACAF Champions' Cup
26	Sinaloa	0	1	0	0	0	1	0	0	0	0	0	0	0	0	0	0	0	0	1	Apertura 2012 Copa MX
26	Tijuana	1	0	0	0	0	1	0	0	0	0	0	0	0	0	0	0	0	0	1	Apertura 2012 Liga MX
26	Asturias	1	0	0	0	0	1	0	0	0	0	0	0	0	0	0	0	0	0	1	1943–44 Liga Mayor

== See also ==
- Football in Mexico
- Mexican Football Federation
- Liga MX
- List of football clubs in Mexico
- List of Mexican football champions
- Copa MX
- Campeón de Campeones
- List of CONCACAF club competition winners
