= Apertura 2016 Copa MX final =

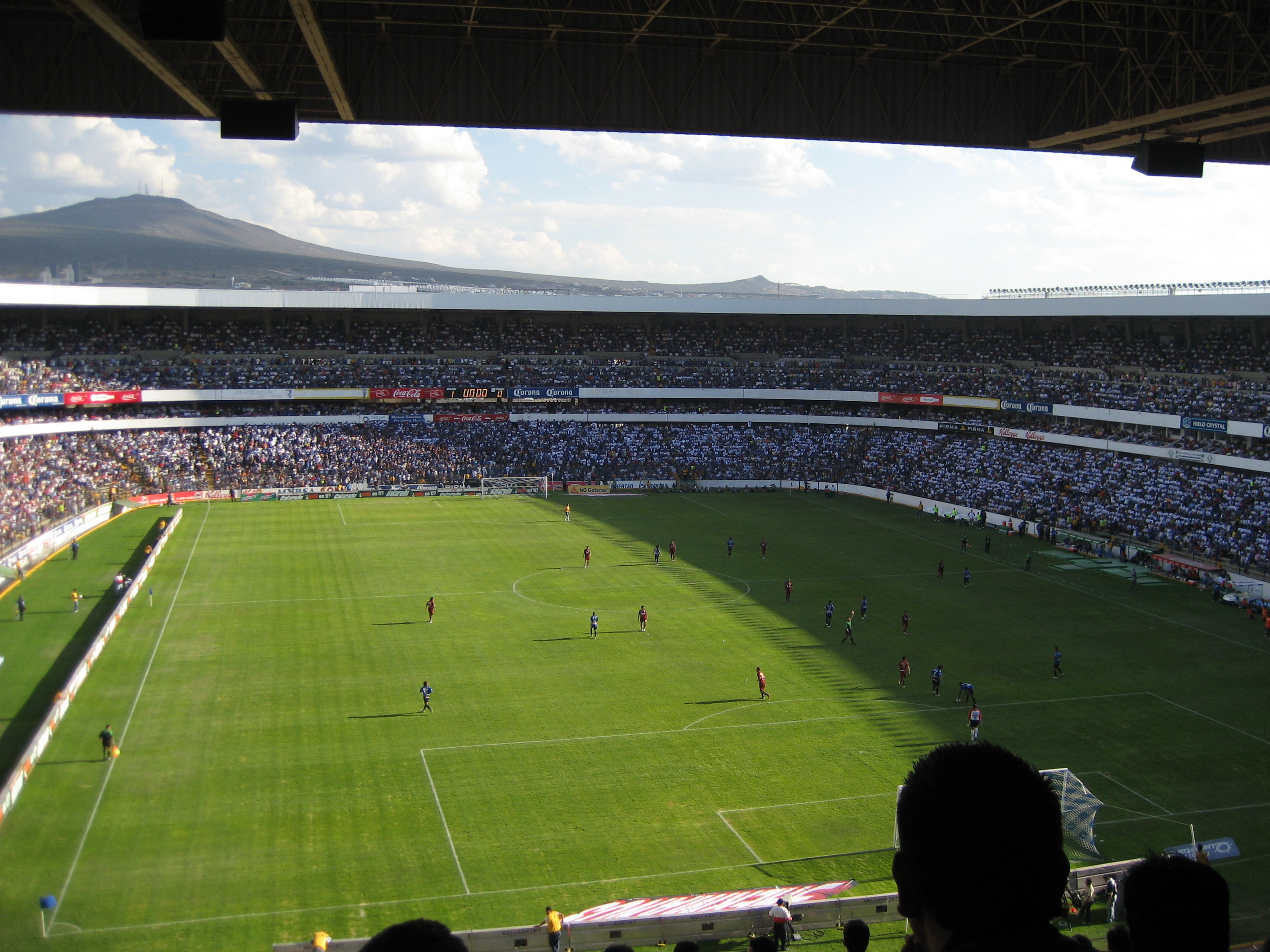
- Estadio Corregidora, the host venue
- Event: Apertura 2016 Copa MX
Querétaro	Guadalajara
0	0
- Querétaro won 3–2 on penalty kicks
- Date: 2 November 2016
- Venue: Estadio Corregidora, Querétaro, Querétaro
- Referee: Oscar Macías Romo
- Attendance: 33,193

The Apertura 2016 Copa MX final was the final of the Apertura 2016 Copa MX, the ninth edition of the Copa MX under its current format and 76th overall organized by the Mexican Football Federation, the governing body of association football in Mexico.

The final was contested in a single leg format between Liga MX clubs Querétaro and Guadalajara. The match was hosted by Querétaro at Estadio Corregidora in Querétaro, Querétaro. As winners, Querétaro earned a spot to face the winners of the Clausura 2017 edition in the 2017 Supercopa MX.

== Qualified teams ==
Team	Previous finals appearances (bold indicates winners)
Querétaro	None
Guadalajara	10 (1948, 1951, 1952, 1954, 1955, **1963**, 1967, **1970**, Clausura 2015, **Apertura 2015**)

== Venue ==
Due to the tournament's regulations the higher seed among both finalists during the group stage will host the final, thus Estadio Corregidora hosted the final. Opened on 5 February 1985 with a match between the national teams of Mexico and Poland, the venue has been home to various football franchises based in Querétaro. This is the second time in less than two years, the venue has hosted a final of any kind, the previous was the Liga MX Clausura 2015 final between Querétaro and Santos Laguna where Querétaro lost 5–3 on aggregate. The venue also hosted four games of the 1986 FIFA World Cup and nine of the 2011 FIFA U-17 World Cup.

== Background ==
Querétaro previously never won the tournament. Before reaching this final, the last time Querétaro reached a final of any kind was the Liga MX Clausura 2015 final where they lost to Santos Laguna 5–3 on aggregate. Guadalajara last reached a final the previous year when they defeated León in the Apertura 2015 Copa MX Final.

Querétaro won two, drew one, lost one and scored six goals during group stage, as they were seeded second. They eliminated BUAP in the Round of 16, Cruz Azul in the quarterfinals, and Toluca in the semifinals on penalty kicks.

Guadalajara won one, drew two, lost one and scored four goals during group stage, as they were seeded second. They eliminated Morelia in the Round of 16, Oaxaca in the quarterfinals and their arch-rivals, América, in the semifinals on penalty kicks.

== Road to the finals ==
Note: In all results below, the score of the finalist is given first.

Querétaro		Round	Guadalajara	
Opponent	Result	Group stage	Opponent	Result
Puebla	1–2 (H)	Matchday 1	Chiapas	1–4 (H)
Sinaloa	2–1 (A)	Matchday 2	Tapachula	0–0 (A)
Sinaloa	2–0 (H)	Matchday 3	Tapachula	1–0 (H)
Puebla	1–1 (A)	Matchday 4	Chiapas	2–2 (A)
**Group 8 runners-up**: Pos / Team / Pld / W / D / L / GF / GA / GD / Pts / Qualification; 1 / Puebla / 4 / 3 / 1 / 0 / 6 / 3 / +3 / **10** / Knockout stage; 2 / Querétaro / 4 / 2 / 1 / 1 / 6 / 4 / +2 / **7** / Knockout stage; 3 / Sinaloa / 4 / 0 / 0 / 4 / 2 / 7 / −5 / **0**; Source: Rules for classification: Tiebreakers		Final standings	**Group 2 runners-up**: Pos / Team / Pld / W / D / L / GF / GA / GD / Pts / Qualification; 1 / Chiapas / 4 / 1 / 3 / 0 / 8 / 5 / +3 / **6** / Knockout stage; 2 / Guadalajara / 4 / 1 / 2 / 1 / 4 / 6 / −2 / **5** / Knockout stage; 3 / Tapachula / 4 / 0 / 3 / 1 / 2 / 3 / −1 / **3**; Source: Rules for classification: Tiebreakers	
Opponent	Result	Knockout stage	Opponent	Result
BUAP	3–1 (H)	Round of 16	Morelia	1–0 (A)
Cruz Azul	3–1 (A)	Quarterfinals	Oaxaca	1–0 (H)
Toluca	0–0 (8–7) (A)	Semifinals	América	1–1 (4–3) (H)

== Match ==
2 November 2016
20:00

Querétaro	0–0	Guadalajara
	Report
Penalties
Benítez (penalty scored); Volpi (penalty scored); Candelo (penalty missed); Noriega (penalty scored)	3–2	(penalty missed) Pereira; (penalty scored) Alanís; (penalty missed) Cisneros; (penalty scored) Pineda; (penalty missed) Pulido

Estadio Corregidora, Querétaro
Attendance: 33,193
Referee: Oscar Macías Romo

**Querétaro**	**Guadalajara**

GK	1	(Brazil) Tiago Volpi
DF	12	(United States) Jonathan Bornstein
DF	3	(Argentina) Miguel Martínez (c)
DF	6	(Argentina) Juan Forlín	(yellow card) 42'
DF	28	(Mexico) Jaime Gómez
MF	14	(Mexico) Luis Miguel Noriega
MF	21	(Mexico) Marco Jiménez		(substituted off) 64'
MF	29	(Argentina) Neri Cardozo
MF	19	(Colombia) Yerson Candelo
MF	9	(Mexico) Carlos Fierro		(substituted off) 64'
FW	7	(Brazil) Camilo Sanvezzo		(substituted off) 76'
Substitutions:
GK	23	(Mexico) Édgar Hernández
DF	4	(Mexico) Dionicio Escalante
DF	83	(Mexico) Ricardo Peña
FW	11	(Paraguay) Édgar Benítez		(substituted on) 64'
FW	15	(Mexico) Ángel Sepúlveda		(substituted on) 76'
FW	20	(Colombia) Andrés Rentería	(red card) 71'	(substituted on) 64'
FW	30	(Argentina) Emanuel Villa
Manager:
(Mexico) Víctor Manuel Vucetich

GK	1	(Mexico) José Antonio Rodríguez
DF	16	(Mexico) Miguel Ángel Ponce	(yellow card) 72'
DF	2	(Mexico) Oswaldo Alanís
DF	4	(Mexico) Jair Pereira (c)	(yellow card) 44'
DF	17	(Mexico) Jesús Sánchez		(substituted off) 26'
MF	27	(Mexico) Carlos Peña
MF	23	(Mexico) José Juan Vázquez
MF	10	(Mexico) Eduardo López		(substituted off) 56'
MF	18	(Mexico) Néstor Calderón	(yellow card) 70'	(substituted off) 73'
MF	24	(Mexico) Carlos Cisneros
FW	9	(Mexico) Alan Pulido
Substitutions:
GK	30	(Mexico) Rodolfo Cota
DF	3	(Mexico) Carlos Salcido
DF	28	(Mexico) Miguel Basulto
MF	7	(Mexico) Orbelín Pineda
MF	11	(Mexico) Isaác Brizuela		(substituted on) 26'
FW	14	(Mexico) Ángel Zaldívar	(yellow card) 81'	(substituted on) 56'
FW	19	(Mexico) Marco Bueno		(substituted on) 73'
Manager:
(Argentina) Matías Almeyda

Assistant referees:
Marvin Torrentera
Mario Jesús López
Fourth official:
Jorge Antonio Pérez

== Broadcasters ==
Country	Free	Pay	Ref
Mexico	Azteca 7 Canal 5 Imagen Televisión	Claro Sports; ESPN 2 TDN; TVC Deportes; UnivisionTDN	
United States		Univision Deportes Network	
