= 1941–42 Copa México =

Tournament details
- Country: Mexico
- Teams: 16

Final positions
- Champions: Atlante (1st Title) (1st title)
- Runners-up: Necaxa

Tournament statistics
- Matches played: 18
- Goals scored: 106 (5.89 per match)

The 1941–42 Copa México Copa México, was the 26th staging of this Mexican football cup competition that existed from 1907 to 1997.

The competition started on May 31, 1942, and concluded on September 20, 1942, with the Final, held at the Parque Asturias in México DF, in which Atlante F.C. lifted the trophy for first time.

For this edition the team which lose 2 matches is eliminated

== First round ==
May 31

Club España	4 - 4 (AET)	Moctezuma

June 7

Marte	2 - 4	Asturias

June 14

Necaxa	5 - 2	Seleccion Jalisco

June 21

Club España	3 - 3 (AET)	Moctezuma

June 28

Atlante F.C.	5 - 3	América

Second play off

June 28

Club España	5 - 3	Moctezuma

July 5

Necaxa	5 - 2	Asturias

July 12

Marte	4 - 3	Seleccion Jalisco

Seleccion Jalisco Eliminated

July 19

Atlante F.C.	4 - 0	Club España

July 26

Club América	3 - 2	Moctezuma

Moctezuma Eliminated

August 2

Necaxa	2 - 0	Atlante F.C.

Necaxa only undefeated team, bye to final

August 9

Marte	2 - 1	Asturias

Asturias eliminated

August 16

América	4 - 4 (AET)	Club España

Play Off

August 23

América	0 - 6	Club España

América Eliminated

August 30

Club España	1 - 2 (AET)	Marte

Club España Eliminated

September 6

Atlante F.C.	4 - 1	Marte

Marte Eliminated

== Final ==
=== First leg ===
September 13

Necaxa	3 - 5	Atlante F.C.

Parque Asturias, Mexico DF

=== Second leg ===
September 20

Atlante F.C.	5 - 0	Necaxa

Parque Asturias, Mexico DF

Atlante Won the cup aggregate 10-3

Copa México 1941-42 Winners
Atlante F.C.
1st Title
