= 1952–53 Copa México =

Tournament details
- Country: Mexico
- Teams: 12

Final positions
- Champions: Puebla (2nd Title) (1st title)
- Runners-up: Club León

Tournament statistics
- Matches played: 67
- Goals scored: 226 (3.37 per match)

The 1952–53 Copa México was the 37th edition of the Copa México; the 10th edition in the professional era.

The competition started on February 15, 1953, and concluded on May 31, 1953 with team Puebla winning the trophy for the second time.

== Group stage ==
=== Group A ===
Pos	Team	Pld	W	D	L	GF	GA	GD	Pts	Qualification
1	Puebla	11	7	2	2	24	13	+11	16	Directly qualified to the next stage
2	Atlante	10	5	1	4	18	18	0	11	Directly qualified to the next stage
3	Zacatepec	10	4	1	5	23	21	+2	9	
4	Necaxa	10	3	3	4	13	15	−2	9	
5	Marte	10	2	5	3	17	20	−3	9	
6	América	10	2	2	6	10	18	−8	6	

Results

Home \ Away	ATE	AMÉ	MAR	NEC	PUE	ZAC
Atlante		0–1	3–3	3–1	4–2	3–2
América	0–1		2–2	1–1	1–3	0–2
Marte	1–2	2–0		1–0	1–1	1–3
Necaxa	1–0	0–1	3–3		1–1	2–1
Puebla	2–1	3–1	4–1	2–1		3–2
Zacatepec	5–1	4–3	2–2	2–3	0–3	

Legend: Blue = home team win; Yellow = draw; Red = away team win.

=== Group B ===
Pos	Team	Pld	W	D	L	GF	GA	GD	Pts	Qualification
1	León	10	6	2	2	19	13	+6	14	Directly qualified to the next stage
2	Guadalajara	10	5	2	3	17	14	+3	12	Played a play-off game
3	Tampico	10	5	2	3	20	18	+2	12	Played a play-off game
4	Atlas	10	4	3	3	15	11	+4	11	
5	CD Oro	10	3	1	6	18	22	−4	7	
6	La Piedad	10	1	2	7	9	20	−11	4	

Results

Home \ Away	ATL	ORO	GUA	LAP	LEÓ	TAM
Atlas		3–1	0–1	3–1	0–0	2–0
CD Oro	2–1		2–2	0–2	0–2	6–4
Guadalajara	1–1	0–0		4–1	3–1	1–2
La Piedad	0–1	1–4	1–2		1–1	4–5
León	3–2	2–1	5–2	2–0		3–1
Tampico Madero	2–2	4–2	1–0	1–1	3–0	

Legend: Blue = home team win; Yellow = draw; Red = away team win.

== Championship round ==
=== Play-off ===
May 14, 1953	Guadalajara	3 – 2	Tampico	Estadio La Martinica, León, Guanajuato
	Tomás Balcázar 22'; Jesús Ponce 33'; Juan Jasso 22' (pen.)		Julio Ayllón 35'; Ayala 60'

=== Semifinals ===
First Leg

May 17, 1953	Atlante	0 – 5	León	Estadio Olimpico Ciudad de los deportes, México D.F.
			Agustín Santillán 23'; Solórzano 39'; Juan José Novo 50'; Luis Leonel Bossa 61'; Marcos Aurelio 67'

May 18, 1953	Guadalajara	0 – 1	Puebla	Estadio Felipe Martínez Sandoval, Guadalajara, Jalisco
			Mariano Uceda 17'

Second Leg

May 24, 1953	León	1 – 0	Atlante	Estadio La Martinica, León, Guanajuato
	Luis Leonel Bossa 41'

May 18, 1953	Puebla	1 – 4	Guadalajara	Parque Mirador, Puebla, Puebla
	Mariano Uceda 34'		Tomás Balcázar 4'; Jesús Ponce 15'; Juan Jasso 63'; Raúl Arellano 84'

Replay

May 18, 1953	Guadalajara	0 – 1	Puebla	Estadio Olimpico Ciudad de los deportes, México D.F.
			Guadalupe Velázquez 87'

=== Final ===
May 31, 1953	León	1 – 4	Puebla	Estadio Olimpico Ciudad de los deportes, México D.F.
	Marcos Aurelio 83'		Fernández 13'; Edwin Cubero 26', 88'; Guadalupe Velázquez 69'

Copa México 1952-53 Winners

2nd title
