= 1949–50 Copa México =

Tournament details
- Country: Mexico
- Teams: 14

Final positions
- Champions: Atlas (1st Title) (1st title)
- Runners-up: Veracruz

Tournament statistics
- Matches played: 14
- Goals scored: 57 (4.07 per match)

The 1949–50 Copa México was the 34th staging of the Copa México, the 7th staging in the professional era.

The competition started on July 9, 1950, and concluded on August 6, 1950, with the final, in which Atlas lifted the trophy for the second time ever with a 3–1 victory over Veracruz.

This edition was played by 14 teams, in a knock-out stage, in a single match.

== First round ==
Played July 9

Team 1	Score	Team 2
Oro	1–3	Atlas
Marte	0-2	Atlante
Moctezuma	1–4	Puebla
San Sebastián	1–3	León

Bye: Asturias F.C., América, Guadalajara, Club España, Tampico and Veracruz,

== Second round ==
Played July 16

Team 1	Score	Team 2
Guadalajara	1-2	Club España
América	0–2	Asturias
Veracruz	4–3	Puebla
Tampico	2–1	León

Bye: Atlante and Atlas

== Third round ==
Played July 23

Team 1	Score	Team 2
Atlante	4-2	Asturias
Atlas	4–3 (AET)	Club España

Bye: Tampico and Veracruz

== Semifinals ==
Played July 30

Team 1	Score	Team 2
Atlante	1-3	Veracruz
Atlas	1-1 (AET)	Tampico

=== Play-off ===
Played August 1

Team 1	Score	Team 2
Atlas	3-1	Tampico

== Final ==
Played August 6

Team 1	Score	Team 2
Atlas	3-1	Veracruz

Copa México 1949-50 Winners
Atlas
2nd Title
