= 1948–49 Copa México =

Tournament details
- Country: Mexico
- Teams: 15

Final positions
- Champions: León (1st Title) (1st title)
- Runners-up: Atlante

Tournament statistics
- Matches played: 14
- Goals scored: 59 (4.21 per match)

The 1948–49 Copa México was the 33rd staging of the Copa México, the 6th staging in the professional era.

The competition started on July 21, 1949, and concluded on August 14, 1949, with the final, in which Club León lifted the trophy for the first time ever with a 3–0 victory over Atlante and won the title of Campeonisimo for winning the league and the cup in the same season. This edition was played by 15 teams, in a knock-out stage, in a single match.

== First round ==
Played between July 21 and July 24

Team 1	Score	Team 2
Marte	2–4	Atlante
Oro	5-3	Asturias
Club España	4–1	América
Atlas	3–0	Guadalajara
Puebla	3–5	Veracruz
Moctezuma	2–1	Orizaba
San Sebastián	1-2	León

Bye: Tampico

== Quarterfinals ==
Played between July 28 and July 31

Team 1	Score	Team 2
Atlante	2-1	Club España
Atlas	2–1	Oro
León	3–1 (AET)	Tampico
Veracruz	2–0	Moctezuma

== Semifinals ==
Played August 7

Team 1	Score	Team 2
Atlante	3-2 (AET)	Veracruz
Atlas	1–2	León

== Final ==
Played August 15

Team 1	Score	Team 2
Atlante	0–3	León

Copa México 1948-49 Winners
León
1st Title
