= 1946–47 Copa México =

Tournament details
- Country: Mexico
- Teams: 15

Final positions
- Champions: Moctezuma (2nd Title) (1st title)
- Runners-up: Oro

Tournament statistics
- Matches played: 16
- Goals scored: 59 (3.69 per match)

The 1946–47 Copa México was the 31st staging of the Copa México, the 4th staging in the professional era.

The competition started on June 15, 1947, and concluded on July 3, 1947, with the final, in which Moctezuma de Orizaba lifted the trophy for the second time with a 4–3 victory over Club Deportivo Oro.

This edition was played by 15 teams, in a knock-out stage, in a single match.

== First round ==
Played on June 15

Team 1	Score	Team 2
Atlante	4–3	América
Oro	1-0	Guadalajara
Moctezuma	3–3 (AET)	Atlas
Puebla	2–1 (AET)	Orizaba
San Sebastián	0–2	Club España
Veracruz	2–1 (AET)	León
Tampico	2–1	Asturias

Bye: Marte

=== Play-off ===
Played on June 17

Team 1	Score	Team 2
Moctezuma	4–3	Atlas

== Quarterfinals ==
Played on June 22

Team 1	Score	Team 2
Oro	2-0	Tampico
Veracruz	4–2	Atlante
Puebla	2–1	Club España
Marte	2–4 (AET)	Moctezuma

== Semifinals ==
Played on June 26

Team 1	Score	Team 2
Moctezuma	2-0	Veracruz
Oro	0–0 (AET)	Puebla

=== Play-off ===
Played on June 29

Team 1	Score	Team 2
Oro	1–0	Puebla

== Final ==
Played on July 3

Team 1	Score	Team 2
Oro	3–4	Moctezuma

Copa México 1946-47 Winners
Moctezuma
2nd title
