= 1954–55 Copa México =

Tournament details
- Country: Mexico
- Teams: 12

Final positions
- Champions: América (2nd title)
- Runner-up: Guadalajara

Tournament statistics
- Matches played: 22
- Goals scored: 57 (2.59 per match)
- Top goal scorer(s): Salvador Reyes (5 goals)

The 1954–55 Copa México was the 39th edition of the Copa México and the 12th staging in the professional era.

The competition started on February 5, 1955, and concluded on March 6, 1955, with the Final, held at the Estadio Olímpico de la Ciudad de los Deportes in Mexico City, in which América defeated Guadalajara 1–0.

== Preliminary round ==
Team 1	Agg.	Team 2	1st leg	2nd leg
Irapuato	2–4	Tampico Madero	0–2	0–2
Marte	1–8	Guadalajara	0–4	1–4
Atlante	3–0	Puebla	0–0	3–0
Toluca	3–3	Necaxa	3–0	0–3

== Final round ==
Quarterfinals
América	1	3	4
Oro	0	1	1
Atlante	3	2	5
Necaxa	1	1	2
Guadalajara	2	5	7
Tampico Madero	1	0	1
Zacatepec	0	3	3
León	1	0	1

Semifinals
América (aet)	2
Atlante	1
Guadalajara	4
Zacatepec	1

Final
América	1
Guadalajara	0

=== Final ===
March 6, 1955

América	1–0	Guadalajara
Cañibe 33'

Estadio Olímpico de la Ciudad de los Deportes, Mexico City

1954–55 Copa México Winners
América
2nd Title
