= 1943–44 Copa México =

Tournament details
- Country: Mexico
- Teams: 12

Final positions
- Champions: Club España (4th Title) (1st title)
- Runners-up: Atlante

Tournament statistics
- Matches played: 28
- Goals scored: 158 (5.64 per match)

The 1943–44 Copa México is the 28th staging of the Copa México, the 1st staging in the professional era.

The competition started on May 7, 1944, and concluded on July 16, 1944, with the Final, held at the Parque Asturias in México DF, in which Club España lifted the trophy for fourth time ever with a 6–2 victory over Atlante F.C.

This edition was played by 12 teams, first with a group stage and later a knock-out stage.

== Group stage ==
Group East

	Club	Pld	W	D	L	GF	GA	+/-	Points
1.	Veracruz	6	4	0	2	20	12	+8	8
2.	Orizaba	6	3	0	3	12	12	0	6
3.	Moctezuma	6	2	1	3	12	13	-1	5
4.	Puebla	6	2	1	3	12	19	-7	5

Group Center

	Club	Pld	W	D	L	GF	GA	+/-	Points
1.	Atlante F.C.	4	4	0	0	12	7	+5	8
2.	Club España	4	2	0	2	8	8	0	8
3.	América	4	2	0	2	13	12	+1	4
4.	Asturias	4	1	0	3	8	10	-2	2
5.	Marte	4	1	0	3	7	11	-4	2

Group West

	Club	Pld	W	D	L	GF	GA	+/-	Points
1.	Atlas	4	3	1	0	10	4	+6	7
2.	Guadalajara	4	2	1	1	16	7	+9	5
3.	León	4	0	0	4	6	21	-15	0

Advances to the next Phase as the winner team in their group.

=== Final phase ===
Semifinals
Atlante F.C. (aet)	4
Atlas	3
Club España	4
Veracruz	3

Final
Atlante F.C.	2
Club España	6

== Semifinals ==
2 July 1944

Atlante F.C.	4 – 3	Atlas
Rafael Zeledón 15'; Horacio Casarín 23'; Jesús Silva 23' (o.g.); Martín Vantolrá 107'		Manuel Grajeda 44', 82'; Antonio Flores 88'

Parque asturias, Mexico DF
9 July 1944

Club España	4 – 3	Veracruz
Domingo Pérez Alonso 36'; Isidro Lángara 42'; Carlos Septién 53'; José Iraragorri 64'		Julián Durán 59'; Félix de los Heros 66'; Carlos Leblanc 70'

Parque asturias, Mexico DF

== Final ==
16 July 1944

Club España	6 – 2	Atlante F.C.
Manuel Gil Fernández 20', 43', 45'; Isidro Lángara 40', 79'; Carlos Septién		Rafael Zeledón 1'; Horacio Casarín

Parque asturias, Mexico DF

Copa México 1943-44 Winners
Club España
4th Title
