= 1945–46 Copa México =

Tournament details
- Country: Mexico
- Teams: 16

Final positions
- Champions: Atlas (1st title)
- Runners-up: Atlante

Tournament statistics
- Matches played: 15
- Goals scored: 88 (5.87 per match)

The 1945–46 Copa México was the 30th staging of the Copa México, the 3rd staging in the professional era.

The competition started on June 23, 1945, and concluded on July 21, 1946, with the final, in which Atlas lifted the trophy for the first time ever with a 5–4 victory over Atlante.

This edition was played by 16 teams, in a knock-out stage, in a single match.

== Knock-out stage ==
Round of 16
June 23
Veracruz	6
Guadalajara	2
June 23
Marte	1
Atlante	5
June 23
Orizaba	3
Moctezuma	1
June 23
Puebla	5
León	1
June 23
San Sebastián	2
América	5
June 23
Oro	4
Club España	2
June 23
Monterrey	1
Atlas	6
June 23
Tampico	5
Asturias	1

Quarter-finals
June 30
Veracruz	2
Atlante	4
June 30
Orizaba	2
Puebla	1
June 30
América	3
Oro	2
June 30
Atlas	6
Tampico	3

Semi-finals
July 6
Atlante	3
Orizaba	0
July 6
América	0
Atlas	3

Final
July 14
Atlante	4
Atlas	5

Copa México 1945-46 Winners
Atlas
1st title
