= 1944–45 Copa México =

Tournament details
- Country: Mexico
- Teams: 6

Final positions
- Champions: Puebla (1st Title) (1st title)
- Runners-up: Atlante

Tournament statistics
- Matches played: 27
- Goals scored: 124 (4.59 per match)

The 1944–45 Copa México is the 29th staging of the Copa México, a Mexican football cup competition that existed from 1907 to 1997, but the 2nd staging in the professional era.

The competition started on June 3, 1945, and concluded on June 24, 1945, with the Final, held at the Parque Asturias in México DF, in which Puebla lifted the trophy for the first time ever with a 6–4 victory over América.

== Final phase ==
First leg:

June 3, 1945
Atlas	4-4	Puebla
Asturias	4-3	Oro
Moctezuma	1-3	América

Second leg:

June 10, 1945
Puebla	4-0	Atlas	agg: 8-4
Oro	5-3	Asturias	agg: 8-7
América	2-3	Moctezuma	agg: 5-4

== Semi-final ==
June 17, 1945
Puebla	3-1	Oro

América bye to Final

== Final ==
June 24, 1945
América	4-6	Puebla

Copa México 1944-45 Winners
Puebla
1st Title
