= 1932–33 Copa México =

Tournament details
- Country: Mexico
- Teams: 10

Final positions
- Champions: Necaxa (3rd Title) (1st title)
- Runners-up: Germania FV

Tournament statistics
- Matches played: 9
- Goals scored: 60 (6.67 per match)

The 1932–33 Copa México was the 17th staging of this Mexican football cup competition that existed from 1907.

The competition started on June 18, 1933, and concluded on July 23, 1933, in which Necaxa lifted the trophy for third time after a 3–1 victory over Germania FV.

== Preliminary round ==
June 18

Germania FV	6 - 4	Atlante

June 18

Leonés	3 - 2	Marte

== Final phase ==
Quarterfinals
Asturias	4
España	2
Necaxa	6
México	0
América	9
Sporting	2
Germania	3
Leonés	2

Semifinals
Asturias	3
Necaxa	5
América	2
Germania	3

Final
Necaxa	3
Germania	1

Copa México 1932-33 Winners
Necaxa
3rd Title
