= 1959–60 Copa México =

Tournament details
- Country: Mexico
- Teams: 14

Final positions
- Champions: Necaxa (5th title)
- Runners-up: Tampico Madero

Tournament statistics
- Matches played: 25
- Goals scored: 94 (3.76 per match)

The 1959–60 Copa México was the 43rd edition of the Copa México and the 17th staging in the professional era.

The competition started on March 6, 1960, and concluded on April 17, 1960, with the Final, held at the Estadio Olímpico Universitario in Mexico City, in which Necaxa defeated Tampico Madero 4–1.

== First round ==
Team 1	Agg.	Team 2	1st leg	2nd leg
Necaxa	8–3	Real Zamora	1–1	7–2
Tampico Madero	6–2	América	1–1	5–1
Atlas	3–2	Oro	1–1	2–1
León	2–5	Guadalajara	1–2	1–3
Atlante	2–3	Toluca	1–1	1–2
Morelia	3–3 (3–1 p)	Irapuato	1–3	2–0

== Final round ==
Quarterfinals
Celaya	1	1	2
Necaxa	5	2	7
Morelia	0	0	0
Toluca	1	1	2
Atlas	2	4	6
Guadalajara	2	1	3
Tampico Madero (aet)	2	5	7
Zacatepec	3	3	6

Semifinals
Necaxa	2	1	3
Toluca	2	0	2
Atlas	1	2	3
Tampico Madero	4	2	6

Final
Necaxa	4
Tampico Madero	1

== Final ==
April 17, 1960

Necaxa	4–1	Tampico Madero

Estadio Olímpico Universitario, Mexico City

1959–60 Copa México Winners
Necaxa
5th Title
