= 1967–68 Copa México =

Tournament details
- Country: Mexico
- Teams: 16

Final positions
- Champions: Atlas (4th title)
- Runners-up: Veracruz

Tournament statistics
- Matches played: 53
- Goals scored: 135 (2.55 per match)

The 1967–68 Copa México is the 52nd staging of the Copa México.

The competition started on March 19, 1967, and concluded on May 18, 1967, with the final, played at the Estadio Olímpico Universitario in Mexico City, in which Atlas lifted the trophy for the fourth time ever with a 2–1 victory over Veracruz.

This edition was played by 16 teams, first played a group stage, later a knock-out stage.

== Group stage ==
=== Group 1 ===
Pos	Team	Pld	W	D	L	GF	GA	GD	Pts	Qualification
1	Toluca	5	3	1	1	11	6	+5	10	Advanced to the final stage
2	Oro	6	2	3	1	7	8	−1	9	
3	Atlante F.C.	6	1	4	1	9	10	−1	7	
4	Pachuca	5	0	2	3	6	9	−3	2	

Results

Home \ Away	ATE	ORO	PAC	TOL
Atlante		2–2	0–0	2–2
CD Oro	1–1		1–0	2–0
Pachuca	3–4	1–1		
Toluca	2–0	4–0	3–2	

Legend: Blue = home team win; Yellow = draw; Red = away team win.

=== Group 2 ===
Pos	Team	Pld	W	D	L	GF	GA	GD	Pts	Qualification
1	Cruz Azul	6	3	1	2	7	5	+2	10	Advanced to the final stage
2	Guadalajara	6	2	2	2	7	7	0	8	
3	Nuevo León	6	2	2	2	7	8	−1	8	
4	UNAM	6	2	1	3	6	7	−1	7	

Results

Home \ Away	CAZ	GUA	NVLN	UNM
Cruz Azul		3–1	1–1	1–0
Guadalajara	0–1		2–0	1–1
Nuevo León	1–0	2–2		3–1
UNAM	2–1	0–1	2–0	

Legend: Blue = home team win; Yellow = draw; Red = away team win.

=== Group 3 ===
Pos	Team	Pld	W	D	L	GF	GA	GD	Pts	Qualification
1	Atlas	6	3	2	1	9	7	+2	11	Advanced to the final stage
2	Monterrey	6	3	2	1	8	6	+2	11	
3	Necaxa	6	1	3	2	8	9	−1	6	
4	León	6	1	1	4	5	8	−3	4	

Results

Home \ Away	ATL	LEON	MON	NEC
Atlas		2–1	2–1	2–1
Leon	1–1		1–2	2–1
Monterrey	1–0	1–0		2–2
Necaxa	2–2	1–0	1–1	

Legend: Blue = home team win; Yellow = draw; Red = away team win.

=== Group 4 ===
Pos	Team	Pld	W	D	L	GF	GA	GD	Pts	Qualification
1	Veracruz	6	3	2	1	8	3	+5	11	Advanced to the final stage
2	América	6	3	2	1	11	9	+2	11	
3	Irapuato	6	2	2	2	9	10	−1	8	
4	Morelia	6	0	2	4	7	13	−6	2	

Results

Home \ Away	AMÉ	IRA	MOR	VER
América		4–2	3–2	0–0
Irapuato	2–2		2–2	1–0
Morelia	1–2	0–2		1–0
Veracruz	2–0	2–0	2–0	

Legend: Blue = home team win; Yellow = draw; Red = away team win.

== Final stage ==
Semifinals
1	Toluca	1	1	2
3	Atlas	2	1	3
2	Cruz Azul	0	1	1 (4)
4	Veracruz	0	1	1 (7)

Final
3	Atlas	2	2
4	Veracruz	1	1

=== Semifinals ===
First Leg

May 7, 1968

Toluca	1 – 2	Atlas
Albino Morales		José Delgado 8'; José Rodriguez 28'

Estadio Nemesio Díez, Toluca
May 7, 1968

Cruz Azul	0 – 0	Veracruz

Estadio Azteca, Mexico, DF

Second Leg

May 14, 1968

Atlas	1 – 2	Toluca
José Delgado 8'		Romero Reyes

Estadio Jalisco, Guadalajara
May 14, 1968

Veracruz	1 – 1	Cruz Azul
Pelaez		Munguia

Estadio Luis de la Fuente, Veracruz

=== Final ===
May 18, 1968

Atlas	2 – 1	Veracruz
José Rodriguez 63'; José Delgado 68'		Mariano Ubiracy 20'

Estadio Azteca, Mexico, DF

1967–68 Copa México Winners

4th title
