= 1956–57 Copa México =

1955–56 Copa México
Tournament details
- Country: Mexico
- Teams: 14

Final positions
- Champions: Zacatepec (1st title)
- Runners-up: León

Tournament statistics
- Matches played: 29
- Goals scored: 80 (2.76 per match)
- Top goal scorer: Juan Fuentes (5 goals)

The 1956–57 Copa México was the 41st edition of the Copa México and the 14th staging in the professional era. Thirteen teams from Primera División and three from Segunda División participated.

The competition started on March 3, 1957, and concluded on April 28, 1957, with the Final, held at the Estadio Olímpico de la Ciudad de los Deportes in Mexico City, in which Zacatepec defeated León 1–0.

== Round of 16 ==
| Team 1 | Agg. | Team 2 | 1st leg | 2nd leg |
|---|---|---|---|---|
| Atlante | 1–2 | Morelia | 0–2 | 1–0 |
| Oro | 6–3 | Atlas | 3–3 | 3–0 |
| Tampico Madero | 5–3 | Monterrey | 2–3 | 3–0 |
| Guadalajara | 2–5 | León | 0–1 | 2–4 |
| Necaxa | 2–4 | Zacatepec | 1–3 | 1–1 |
| Irapuato | 0–4 | Toluca | 0–3 | 0–1 |
| Cuautla | 3–5 | América | 2–5 | 1–0 |
| Nacional | 2–4 | Zamora | 1–3 | 1–1 |

== Quarterfinals ==
| Team 1 | Agg. | Team 2 | 1st leg | 2nd leg |
|---|---|---|---|---|
| Tampico Madero | 2–1 (aet) | Zamora | 0–0 | 2–1 |
| León | 5–2 | Oro | 0–2 | 5–0 |
| Morelia | 1–2 | Zacatepec | 0–2 | 1–0 |
| Toluca | 1–3 | América | 0–3 | 1–0 |

== Semifinals ==
| Team 1 | Agg. | Team 2 | 1st leg | 2nd leg |
|---|---|---|---|---|
| Tampico Madero | 2–5 | León | 0–5 | 2–0 |
| Zacatepec | 3–1 | América | 2–1 | 1–0 |

== Final ==
April 28, 1957

| Zacatepec | 1–0 | León |
|---|---|---|
| Cabañas 30' |

Estadio Olímpico de la Ciudad de los Deportes, Mexico City

1956–57 Copa México Winners
Zacatepec
1st Title
