= 1950–51 Mexican Primera División season =

8th professional season of the top division of Mexican football

Primera División de México
- Season: 1950–51
- Champions: Atlas (1st title)
- Relegated: San Sebastián
- Matches: 132
- Goals: 450 (3.41 per match)

The 1950–51 season was the 8th edition of the Mexican professional league known as Primera División de México. It was the first season with relegation, 12 clubs participated.

== Clubs ==
Location of the 1950-51 Primera División teams

Team	City	Stadium
América	Mexico City	Ciudad de los Deportes
Atlante	Mexico City	Ciudad de los Deportes
Atlas	Guadalajara, Jalisco	Parque Oblatos
Guadalajara	Guadalajara, Jalisco	Parque Oblatos
León	León, Guanajuato	Enrique Fernández Martínez
Marte	Mexico City	Ciudad de los Deportes
Necaxa	Mexico City	Ciudad de los Deportes
Oro	Guadalajara, Jalisco	Parque Oblatos
Puebla	Puebla, Puebla	Parque El Mirador
San Sebastián	León, Guanajuato	La Martinica
Tampico	Tampico, Tamaulipas	Tampico
Veracruz	Veracruz, Veracruz	Parque Deportivo Veracruzano

== League standings ==
Pos	Team	Pld	W	D	L	GF	GA	GD	Pts	Qualification or relegation
1	Atlas	22	12	6	4	44	23	+21	30	Champions
2	Atlante	22	12	5	5	48	27	+21	29	Runners-up
3	Necaxa	22	12	4	6	37	28	+9	28	Third place
4	León	22	10	6	6	39	27	+12	26	
5	Guadalajara	22	9	7	6	42	33	+9	25	
6	Veracruz	22	9	4	9	41	45	−4	22	
7	Puebla	22	9	3	10	38	47	−9	21	
8	Oro	22	10	0	12	40	53	−13	20	
9	Tampico	22	9	1	12	34	38	−4	19	
10	América	22	5	7	10	26	35	−9	17	
11	Marte	22	6	4	12	33	48	−15	16	
12	San Sebastián	22	2	7	13	28	46	−18	11	Relegated

Source: RSSSF

Champions

1st title

== Results ==
Home \ Away	AME	ATE	ATS	GDL	LEO	MAR	NEC	ORO	PUE	SEB	TAM	VER
América	—	3–3	1–1	0–2	1–2	1–2	0–1	4–1	1–0	0–3	3–4	2–2
Atlante	0–1	—	2–1	2–0	1–0	5–0	2–1	0–1	2–4	1–0	1–0	1–1
Atlas	1–1	0–2	—	1–0	0–0	2–0	1–0	3–0	4–2	4–1	4–1	3–0
Guadalajara	0–0	3–2	0–4	—	2–2	4–2	0–0	3–2	2–0	3–1	5–1	7–3
León	0–1	2–2	1–2	1–1	—	2–1	1–1	1–2	4–0	2–2	2–0	2–0
Marte	3–1	0–6	3–1	2–2	0–3	—	0–2	4–0	1–4	3–1	2–2	2–2
Necaxa	2–1	1–4	1–1	2–1	1–4	2–0	—	2–1	1–2	1–1	1–0	4–2
Oro	3–1	2–6	2–4	1–2	4–1	3–2	2–1	—	3–1	1–0	0–3	4–1
Puebla	2–2	3–1	1–1	1–1	1–3	0–3	0–4	4–3	—	4–3	2–0	4–3
San Sebastián	1–1	2–2	1–1	2–2	3–4	0–0	0–2	2–4	1–2	—	1–2	3–2
Tampico	0–1	1–2	2–1	2–1	1–2	2–1	3–4	6–1	1–0	2–0	—	0–1
Veracruz	2–0	1–1	2–4	2–1	1–0	3–2	2–3	2–0	3–1	3–0	3–1	—

Updated to match(es) played on 26 April 1951. Source: RSSSF
Legend: Blue = home team win; Yellow = draw; Red = away team win.
