= 1942–43 Copa México =

Tournament details
- Country: Mexico
- Teams: 10

Final positions
- Champions: Moctezuma (1st Title) (1st title)
- Runners-up: Atlante

Tournament statistics
- Matches played: 27
- Goals scored: 124 (4.59 per match)

The 1942–43 Copa México Copa México, was the 27th staging of this Mexican football cup competition.

The competition started on May 30, 1943, and concluded on September 19, 1943, with the final, held at the Parque Asturias in México DF, in which Moctezuma lifted the trophy for first time.

In April 1943 in an initiative of América and Atlante started the professional era in Mexican soccer, Necaxa didn't accept that resolution and decided to retire as well the Selección Jalisco which was dissolved.

The clubs Guadalajara and Atlas as well Orizaba and Veracruz joined the league, so, the Cup Tournament of 1942–43 season was the first one in the Professional Era.

== Group stage ==
Group A

Pos	Team	Pld	W	D	L	GF	GA	GD	Pts	Qualification
1	Club España (Mexico City)	4	3	0	1	16	6	+10	6	Advanced to the next phase
2	Atlante F.C. (Mexico City)	4	2	1	1	11	6	+5	5	Advanced to the next phase
3	Orizaba (Orizaba)	4	2	0	2	6	9	−3	4	Advanced to the next phase
4	Moctezuma (Orizaba)	4	1	1	2	10	13	−3	3	Advanced to the next phase
5	Veracruz (Veracruz)	4	1	0	3	8	17	−9	2	

Results

Home \ Away	ATE	MOC	ORI	RCE	VER
Atlante		2–2			
Moctezuma			2–4		5–2
Orizaba	1–0				
Real Club España	2–3	5–1	4–0		
Veracruz	1–6		3–1	2–5	

Legend: Blue = home team win; Yellow = draw; Red = away team win.

Group B

Pos	Team	Pld	W	D	L	GF	GA	GD	Pts	Qualification
1	Marte (Mexico City)	4	3	0	1	10	5	+5	6	Advanced to the next phase
2	Asturias (Mexico City)	4	2	0	2	8	4	+4	4	Advanced to the next phase
3	Guadalajara (Guadalajara)	4	2	0	2	7	9	−2	4	Advanced to the next phase
4	América (Mexico DF)	4	2	0	2	6	8	−2	4	Advanced to the next phase
5	Atlas (Guadalajara)	4	1	0	3	6	11	−5	2	

Results

Home \ Away	AMÉ	ATL	AST	GUA	MAR
América		5–3	1–0		
Atlas				3–1	0–1
Asturias		4–0			3–0
Guadalajara	1–0		3–1		
Marte	4–0			5–2	

Legend: Blue = home team win; Yellow = draw; Red = away team win.

== Second phase ==
Quarterfinals; From August 8 to August 29
América	2
Orizaba	3
Marte	0
Moctezuma	2
Atlante F.C.	6
Guadalajara	1
Asturias	4
Club España	3

Semifinals; September 5 and September 12
Orizaba	1
Moctezuma	3
Atlante F.C.	2
Asturias	1

Final; September 19
Moctezuma	5
Atlante F.C.	3

== Final ==
September 19, 1943

Moctezuma	5 - 3 (a.e.t.)	Atlante F.C.

Parque Asturias, Mexico DF

Moctezuma Won the cup

Copa México 1942-43 Winners

1st title
