= 1958–59 Copa México =

Tournament details
- Country: Mexico
- Teams: 14

Final positions
- Champions: Zacatepec (2nd title)
- Runners-up: León

Tournament statistics
- Matches played: 26
- Goals scored: 109 (4.19 per match)

The 1958–59 Copa México was the 42nd edition of the Copa México and the 16th staging in the professional era.

The competition started on March 15, 1959, and concluded on April 26, 1959, with the Final, held at the Estadio Olímpico de la Ciudad de los Deportes in Mexico City, in which Zacatepec defeated León 1–0, a replay of the 1957–58 tournament final.

== Preliminary round ==
Team 1	Agg.	Team 2	1st leg	2nd leg
Necaxa	5–7	León	1–5	4–2
Toluca	6–5	Celaya	3–3	3–2
Atlas	7–2	América	3–1	4–1
Morelia	6–6 (3–2 p)	Oro	2–5	4–1
Cuautla	3–7	Guadalajara	1–2	2–5
Atlante	1–4	Zacatepec	1–2	0–2

== Final round ==
Quarterfinals
Atlas	1	1	2
Toluca	3	3	6
Zacatepec	1	3	4
Irapuato	1	1	2
León	3	4	7
Real Zamora	2	1	3
Morelia	1	2	3
Guadalajara	6	2	8

Semifinals
Toluca	1	1	2
Zacatepec	0	3	3
León	5	2	7
Guadalajara	2	0	2

Final
Zacatepec	1
León	0

== Final ==
April 26, 1959

Zacatepec	1–0	León

Estadio Olímpico de la Ciudad de los Deportes, Mexico City

1958–59 Copa México Winners
Zacatepec
2nd Title
