= 1935–36 Copa Mexico =

1935–36 Copa México
Tournament details
- Country: Mexico
- Teams: 5

Final positions
- Champions: Necaxa (4th Title) (1st title)
- Runners-up: Asturias

Tournament statistics
- Matches played: 4
- Goals scored: 26 (6.5 per match)

The 1935–36 Copa México was the 19th staging of this Mexican football cup competition that existed from 1907.

The competition started on June 7, 1936, and concluded on June 28, 1936, in which Necaxa lifted the trophy for fourth time after a 2–1 victory over Asturias.

== Preliminary round ==
June 7

América	6 - 1	Club España

== Final phase ==
Round 1
June 14th
Atlante	3
Asturias	4
July 8th
Necaxa	9
América	0

Round 2
July 15th
Asturias	1
Necaxa	2

Copa México 1935-36 Winners
Necaxa
4th Title
