= 1947–48 Copa Mexico =

1947–48 Copa México
Tournament details
- Country: Mexico
- Teams: 15

Final positions
- Champions: Veracruz (2nd Title) (1st title)
- Runners-up: Guadalajara

Tournament statistics
- Matches played: 14
- Goals scored: 58 (4.14 per match)

The 1947–48 Copa México was the 32nd staging of the Copa México, and the 5th staging in the professional era.

The competition started on July 1, 1948, and concluded on July 25, 1948, with the final, in which Veracruz lifted the trophy for the first time ever with a 1–3 victory over Guadalajara.

This edition was played by 15 teams, in a knock-out stage, in a single match.

== First round ==
Played June 1 and July 4

Team 1	Score	Team 2
Club España	3–1	Asturias
Atlas	3-2	Oro
Marte	3–1	América
Guadalajara	4–2	Atlante
Puebla	3–1	Orizaba
Veracruz	3–1	Orizaba
León	4-0	Tampico

Bye: San Sebastián

== Quarterfinals ==
Played July 11

Team 1	Score	Team 2
Guadalajara	1-0	Atlas
Club España	2–4 (AET)	Marte
San Sebastián	1–3	León
Puebla	1–2	Veracruz

== Semifinals ==
Played July 18

Team 1	Score	Team 2
Marte	1-2	Veracruz
Guadalajara	5–1	León

== Final ==
Played July 25

Team 1	Score	Team 2
Guadalajara	1–3	Veracruz

Copa México 1947-48 Winners
Veracruz
1st Title
