= 1955–56 Copa México =

Tournament details
- Country: Mexico
- Teams: 14

Final positions
- Champions: Toluca (1st title)
- Runners-up: Irapuato

Tournament statistics
- Matches played: 25
- Goals scored: 78 (3.12 per match)
- Top goal scorer(s): Juan Carlos Carrera; Jaime Ortiz; Carlos Lázcares (6 goals)

The 1955–56 Copa México was the 40th edition of the Copa México.

The competition started on 7 April 1956, and concluded on 27 May 1956, with the Final, held at the Estadio Olímpico de la Ciudad de los Deportes in Mexico City, in which Toluca defeated Irapuato 2–1.

== First round ==
Team 1	Agg.	Team 2	1st leg	2nd leg
Atlas	9–3	Zamora	3–0	6–2
Oro	2–3	Irapuato	0–1	2–2
León	5–2	Guadalajara	2–1	3–1
América	1–3	Toluca	0–1	1–2
Cuautla	2–4	Zacatepec	1–1	1–3
Necaxa	4–5	Atlante	3–3	1–2

== Final round ==
Quarterfinals
Atlante	0	1	1
Toluca	3	2	5
Zacatepec	1	0	1
Puebla	1	1	2
Irapuato	0	4	4
Tampico Madero	1	0	1
Atlas	5	1	6
León	3	2	5

Semifinals
Toluca	0	3	3
Puebla	2	0	2
Irapuato	1	1	2
Atlas	0	0	0

Final
Toluca	2
Irapuato	1

=== Final ===
27 May 1956

Toluca	2–1	Irapuato
Lázcares 2'; Barraza 66'		Sansón 56'

Estadio Olímpico de la Ciudad de los Deportes, Mexico City

1955–56 Copa México Winners
Toluca
1st Title
