= 1957–58 Copa México =

Tournament details
- Country: Mexico
- Teams: 14

Final positions
- Champions: León (2nd title)
- Runners-up: Zacatepec

Tournament statistics
- Matches played: 26
- Goals scored: 76 (2.92 per match)

The 1957–58 Copa México was the 41st edition of the Copa México and the 15th staging in the professional era.

The competition started on March 2, 1958, and concluded on April 15, 1958, with the replay of the Final, held at the Estadio Olímpico de la Ciudad de los Deportes in Mexico City, in which León defeated Zacatepec 5–2.

== Preliminary round ==
Team 1	Agg.	Team 2	1st leg	2nd leg
Tampico Madero	3–3 (1–2 p)	Zacatepec	2–3	1–0
León	5–0	Atlas	0–0	5–0
Necaxa	1–4	Toluca	1–2	0–2
Oro	7–3	Real Zamora	4–2	3–1
Guadalajara	2–2 (3–2 p)	Irapuato	0–0	2–2
Atlante	4–3	Cuautla	1–2	3–1

== Final round ==
Quarterfinals
América	0	1	1
Atlante	2	0	2
Toluca	0	0	0
Zacatepec	0	2	2
León	1	1	2
Tampico Madero	1	0	1
Guadalajara	1	1	2
Morelia	0	4	4

Semifinals
Atlante	1	2	3
Zacatepec	2	2	4
León	2	3	5
Morelia	0	1	1

Final
Zacatepec	1	2	3
León	1	5	6

1957–58 Copa México Winners
León
2nd Title
