= 1951–52 Copa México =

Tournament details
- Country: Mexico
- Teams: 12

Final positions
- Champions: Atlante (2nd Title) (1st title)
- Runners-up: Guadalajara

Tournament statistics
- Matches played: 39
- Goals scored: 133 (3.41 per match)

The 1951–52 Copa México was the 36th edition of the Copa México; the 9th edition in the professional era.

The competition started on February 17, 1952, and concluded on April 6, 1952, with the final match that give to the team Atlante the trophy for the third time.

This edition was played only by 12 teams, however León did not enter because was the base of Mexico national team in the Panamerican Championship hosted in Chile from 16 March to 20 April; which was replaced by La Piedad (Second Division Champions). The competition was first played in a regional group stage and group winners advanced into a final group stage to determine an overall winner.

== Group stage ==
=== Group West ===
Pos	Team	Pld	W	D	L	GF	GA	GD	Pts	Qualification
1	Guadalajara	6	3	3	0	15	9	+6	9	Advances to the next Phase
2	Atlas	6	3	2	1	11	8	+3	8	
3	CD Oro	6	2	1	3	10	10	0	5	
4	La Piedad	6	1	0	5	5	14	−9	2	

Results

Home \ Away	ATL	ORO	GUA	LAP
Atlas		1–0	2–2	6–2
CD Oro	3–0		4–4	2–1
Guadalajara	1–1	3–1		2–1
La Piedad	0–1	1–0	0–3	

Legend: Blue = home team win; Yellow = draw; Red = away team win.

=== Group Center ===
Pos	Team	Pld	W	D	L	GF	GA	GD	Pts	Qualification
1	Atlante	6	4	1	1	9	6	+3	9	Advances to the next Phase
2	América	6	2	2	2	10	11	−1	6	
3	Marte	6	2	1	3	9	10	−1	5	
4	Necaxa	6	2	0	4	9	10	−1	4	

Results

Home \ Away	ATE	AMÉ	MAR	NEC
Atlante		0–1	3–2	2–1
América	2–2		1–2	2–0
Marte	0–1	2–2		1–0
Necaxa	0–1	5–2	3–2	

Legend: Blue = home team win; Yellow = draw; Red = away team win.

=== Group East ===
Pos	Team	Pld	W	D	L	GF	GA	GD	Pts	Qualification
1	Puebla	6	4	2	0	13	8	+5	10	Advances to the next Phase
2	Zacatepec	6	3	0	3	12	10	+2	6	
3	Tampico	6	2	1	3	13	13	0	5	
4	Veracruz	6	1	1	4	9	16	−7	3	

Results

Home \ Away	PUE	TAM	VER	ZAC
Puebla		1–1	3–1	2–1
Tampico Madero	2–3		2–1	3–1
Veracruz	2–2	4–3		0–1
Zacatepec	1–2	3–2	5–1	

Legend: Blue = home team win; Yellow = draw; Red = away team win.

== Final stage ==
All the matches played in Estadio Olímpico Ciudad de los Deportes, Mexico City

Pos	Team	Pld	W	D	L	GF	GA	GD	Pts	Result
1	Atlante	2	2	0	0	5	0	+5	4	Champion
2	Guadalajara	2	1	0	1	3	3	0	2	
3	Puebla	2	0	0	2	0	5	−5	0	

Results

Home \ Away	ATE	GUA	PUE
Atlante		3–0	
Guadalajara			3–0
Puebla	0–2		

Legend: Blue = home team win; Yellow = draw; Red = away team win.

Copa México 1951-52 Winners

3rd title
