= 1950–51 Copa México =

1950–51 Copa MX
Tournament details
- Country: Mexico
- Teams: 12

Final positions
- Champions: Atlante (2nd Title) (1st title)
- Runners-up: Guadalajara

Tournament statistics
- Matches played: 13
- Goals scored: 47 (3.62 per match)

The 1950–51 Copa México was the 35th staging of the Copa México, the 8th staging in the professional era.

The competition started on May 6, 1951, and concluded on May 27, 1951, with the final, in which Atlante lifted the trophy for the second time ever with a 1–0 victory over Guadalajara.

This edition was played only by 12 teams, in a knock-out stage, in a single match.

== First round ==
Played between May 6 and May 8

Team 1	Score	Team 2
América	0-1	Atlante
Tampico	6–2 (AET)	San Sebastián
León	2–3	Oro
Veracruz	2–3	Puebla
Guadalajara	3–0	Atlas

Bye: Marte and Necaxa

== Quarterfinals ==
Played May 13

Team 1	Score	Team 2
Tampico	2-1	Puebla
Marte	2–2 (AET)	Necaxa
Guadalajara	2–0	Oro

Bye: Atlante

=== Play-off ===
Played May 15

Team 1	Score	Team 2
Necaxa	1-0	Marte

== Semifinals ==
Played May 20

Team 1	Score	Team 2
Tampico	1-1 (AET)	Guadalajara
Atlante	4–2	Necaxa

=== Play-off ===
Played May 22

Team 1	Score	Team 2
Tampico	1-5	Guadalajara

== Final ==
Played May 27

Team 1	Score	Team 2
Atlante	1-0	Guadalajara

Copa México 1950-51 Winners
Atlante
2nd Title
