= Peláez =

Peláez (meaning "son of Pelayo") is a surname of Spanish origin. It is first found in Asturias, where the Visigothic court took refuge from the Muslim occupation of Spain. It may refer to:

- Aída Peláez de Villa Urrutia (1895–1923), Cuban writer, journalist and feminist activist (pen name Eugenio)
- Alex Pelaez (born 1976), American baseball player and coach
- Amelia Peláez (1896–1968), Cuban painter of the Avant-garde generation
- Antonio Peláez (1921–1994), Mexican painter of Spanish origin
- Catalina Peláez (born 1991), Colombian squash player
- Cristina Peláez (born 1972), Spanish politician
- Daniel Peláez Balbuena (born 1985), Peruvian footballer
- Daniel Peláez Bellido (born 1986), Spanish footballer
- Emmanuel Pelaez (1915–2003), politician and vice-president of the Philippines
- Gonzalo Peláez (died 1138), military ruler of Asturias in the 12th century
- José Manuel Peláez (born 1988), Peruvian actor
- Josefa Vicenta Giambastiani de Peláez (1891–1974), Argentine geologist
- Manuel Peláez (1885–1959), Mexican military officer in the Mexican Revolution of 1910–1920
- María Peláez (born 1977), Spanish butterfly swimmer
- Munio Peláez (1105–1142), Galician magnate of the 12th century
- Paula Peláez, Chilean Scout
- Pedro Peláez (1812–1863), Filipino Catholic priest and advocate of secularization
- Rachel Peláez (born 1993), Cuban footballer
- Ricardo Peláez (born 1963), Mexican footballer
- Vicky Peláez (born 1956), Peruvian journalist and columnist
- Wilfredo Peláez (1930–2019), Uruguayan basketball player
