= 1990–91 Copa México =

Tournament details
- Country: Mexico
- Teams: 20

Final positions
- Champions: U. de G. (1st title)
- Runners-up: América

Tournament statistics
- Matches played: 86
- Goals scored: 215 (2.5 per match)

The 1990–91 Copa México is the 63rd staging of the Copa México, the 36th staging in the professional era.

The competition started on August 22, 1990, and concluded on January 23, 1991, with the final, in which U. de G. lifted the trophy for first time ever with a 1–0 victory over América.

This edition was played by 20 teams, first with a group stage and later a knock-out stage.

== Group stage ==
Group 1

Pos	Team	Pld	W	D	L	GF	GA	GD	Pts	Qualification
1	Necaxa	8	5	3	0	13	6	+7	13	Advances to the next phase
2	Monterrey	8	5	1	2	16	10	+6	11	
3	Toluca	8	3	3	2	9	7	+2	9	
4	Querétaro	8	1	2	5	8	16	−8	4	
5	Atlas	8	1	1	6	8	15	−7	3	

Results

Home \ Away	ATL	MON	NEC	QUE	TOL
Atlas		1–1	1–2	2–1	0–1
Monterrey	2–1		2–3	4–3	4–0
Necaxa	4–2	1–0		2–0	0–0
Querétaro	1–0	1–2	1–1		1–1
Toluca	3–1	0–1	0–0	4–0	

Legend: Blue = home team win; Yellow = draw; Red = away team win.

Group 2

Pos	Team	Pld	W	D	L	GF	GA	GD	Pts	Qualification
1	Cruz Azul	8	7	0	1	13	4	+9	14	Advances to the next phase
2	Tecos UAG	8	3	2	3	13	7	+6	8	
3	Correcaminos	8	4	0	4	9	11	−2	8	
4	Tigres UANL	8	2	1	5	11	15	−4	5	
5	Irapuato	8	2	1	5	6	15	−9	5	

Results

Home \ Away	CAZ	IRA	UAG	UNL	UAT
Cruz Azul		2–1	1–0	2–1	3–0
Irapuato	0–1		0–0	3–2	2–1
Tecos UAG	1–2	2–1		4–1	3–0
UANL	0–2	2–0	2–2		2–0
UAT	1–0	4–0	1–0	2–1	

Legend: Blue = home team win; Yellow = draw; Red = away team win.

Group 3

Pos	Team	Pld	W	D	L	GF	GA	GD	Pts	Qualification
1	U. de G.	8	4	3	1	10	6	+4	11	Advances to the next phase
2	UNAM	8	2	4	2	13	13	0	8	
3	León	8	2	4	2	7	8	−1	8	
4	Puebla	8	2	4	2	10	10	0	8	
5	Cobras	8	1	3	4	3	6	−3	5	

Results

Home \ Away	CJU	LEON	PUE	UDG	UNM
Cobras Ciudad Juárez		0–1	1–1	0–1	1–1
Leon	0–0		3–1	0–1	1–1
Puebla	1–0	0–0		3–1	2–2
U. de G.	1–0	0–0	1–1		4–1
UNAM	0–1	5–2	2–1	1–1	

Legend: Blue = home team win; Yellow = draw; Red = away team win.

Group 4

Pos	Team	Pld	W	D	L	GF	GA	GD	Pts	Qualification
1	América	8	6	2	0	16	8	+8	14	Advances to the next phase
2	Veracruz	8	3	2	3	12	10	+2	8	
3	Guadalajara	8	4	0	4	11	9	+2	8	
4	Morelia	8	3	1	4	7	11	−4	7	
5	Santos Laguna	8	1	1	6	7	15	−8	3	

Results

Home \ Away	AMÉ	GUA	MOR	SLA	VER
América		2–1	1–0	2–0	1–1
Guadalajara	0–1		2–0	1–0	2–0
Morelia	0–2	1–3		2–1	1–0
Santos Laguna	3–3	2–1	1–2		0–2
Veracruz	3–4	3–1	1–1	2–0	

Legend: Blue = home team win; Yellow = draw; Red = away team win.

== Final stage ==
Semifinals; From October 24 to November 1
3	U. de G.	2	2	4
1	Necaxa	0	1	1
2	Cruz Azul	1	0	1
4	América	4	2	6

Final; January 16 and January 23
3	U. de G.	1	0	1
4	América	0	0	0

== Semifinals ==
=== First leg ===
October 24, 1990

U. de G.	2 - 0	Necaxa
Luis Alberto Flores 24'; Daniel Guzmán 90+2' (pen.)

Estadio Jalisco, Guadalajara

October 24, 1990

Cruz Azul	1 – 4	América
Santiago Ostolaza 34'		Eduardo Antonio dos Santos 2', 26'; Antonio Carlos Santos 19'; Juan Hernández 72'

Estadio Azteca, Mexico DF

=== Second leg ===
November 1, 1990

Necaxa	1 – 2	U. de G.
Sergio Carlos Díaz 52' (pen.)		Hugo Aparecido 20' (pen.); Luis Alberto Flores 32'

Estadio Azteca, Mexico DF

U. de G. advanced to final aggregate 4-1

October 31, 1990

América	2 – 0	Cruz Azul
Luís Roberto Alves 45', 68'

Estadio Azteca, Mexico DF

Club América advanced to final aggregate 6-1

== Final ==
=== First leg ===
January 16, 1991

U. de G.	1 – 0	América
Víctor Manuel Rodríguez 59'

Estadio Jalisco, Guadalajara

=== Second leg ===
January 23, 1991

América	2 – 2	U. de G.

Estadio Azteca, Mexico DF

U. de G. Won the cup aggregate 3-2

Copa México 1990-91 Winners

1st title
