= 1960–61 Copa México =

Tournament details
- Country: Mexico
- Teams: 14

Final positions
- Champions: Tampico Madero (1st title)
- Runners-up: Toluca

Tournament statistics
- Matches played: 25
- Goals scored: 86 (3.44 per match)

The 1960–61 Copa México was the 44th edition of the Copa México and the 18th staging in the professional era.

The competition started on March 18, 1961, and concluded on April 30, 1961, with the Final, held at the Estadio Olímpico Universitario in Mexico City, in which Tampico Madero defeated Toluca 1–0 to win the first cup title for the club.

== First round ==
Team 1	Agg.	Team 2	1st leg	2nd leg
Atlante	3–2	Irapuato	1–1	2–1
Atlas	2–5	América	1–4	1–1
Monterrey	4–6 (aet)	Tampico Madero	0–2	4–4
Toluca	8–4	Zacatepec	2–0	6–4
Guadalajara	3–2	Morelia	1–1	2–1
Necaxa	6–8	León	1–4	5–4
Celaya	4–4 (3–1 p)	Oro	3–2	1–2

== Quarterfinals ==
Team 1	Agg.	Team 2	1st leg	2nd leg
Tampico Madero	2–0	Celaya	0–0	2–0
Toluca	7–4	América	2–3	5–1
Atlante	2–5 (aet)	Guadalajara	3–3	1–2

Bye: León

== Semifinals ==
Team 1	Agg.	Team 2	1st leg	2nd leg
Tampico Madero	2–0	Guadalajara	0–0	2–0
León	2–5	Toluca	0–5	2–0

== Final ==
April 30, 1961

Tampico Madero	1–0	Toluca

Estadio Olímpico Universitario, Mexico City

1960–61 Copa México Winners
Tampico Madero
1st Title
