= Edwin Cubero =

Costa Rican footballer (1924-2000)

Personal information
- Full name: Edwin Cubero Rivera
- Date of birth: February 11, 1924
- Place of birth: San Antonio de Belén, Costa Rica
- Date of death: March 8, 2000 (aged 76)
- Place of death: Guadalajara, Mexico
- Position: Striker

Senior career*
Years	Team	Apps	(Gls)
- Herediano
- Juan Bosco
1948	Sport Club La Libertad	3	
1948–1954	Atlas		(81)
1954–1955	Puebla		
- * Club domestic league appearances and goals

Edwin Cubero Rivera (11 February 1924 - 8 March 2000) was a Costa Rican professional footballer who played for several clubs in Costa Rica and Mexico, enjoying his greatest success with Atlas.

== Club career ==
Born in San Antonio de Belén, Cubero is the all-time leading goalscorer for Atlas and was an important part of the club during the 1950-51 season, their first championship-winning season. He joined Puebla after Atlas released him.

== Later life and death ==
After retiring as a player, Cubero founded the Mudanzas Cubero moving company.

In March 2000, Cubero died from renal failure in Guadalajara, Mexico.
