= Juan Carlos Paz (footballer) =

Uruguayan footballer (born 1944)

Personal information
- Full name: Juan Carlos Paz Sosa
- Date of birth: 6 September 1944 (age 82)
- Position: Midfielder

International career
Years	Team	Apps	(Gls)
1967-1969	Uruguay	3	(0)
Medal record
Men's football
Representing Uruguay
South American Championship
Winner	1967 Uruguay

Juan Carlos Paz (born 6 September 1944) is a Uruguayan footballer. He was part of Uruguay's squad that won the 1967 South American Championship on home soil.
