= Apertura 2015 Copa MX final =

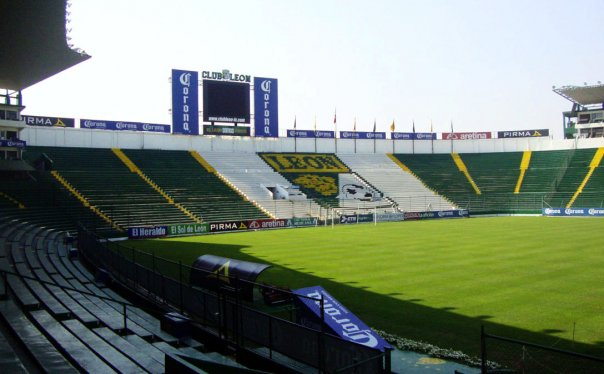
- Estadio León, host of the final
- Event: Apertura 2015 Copa MX
León	Guadalajara
0	1
- Date: 4 November 2015
- Venue: Estadio León, León, Guanajuato
- Referee: Jorge Isaac Rojas
- Attendance: 27,527
- Weather: Scattered Clouds; 62.6 °F (17.0 °C); 72% humidity

The Apertura 2015 Copa MX final was the final of the Apertura 2015 Copa MX, the seventh edition of the Copa MX under its current format and 74th overall organized by the Mexican Football Federation, the governing body of association football in Mexico.

The final was contested in a single leg format between Liga MX clubs, León and Guadalajara. As winners, Guadalajara will face Veracruz (the winners of the Clausura 2016 edition) in the 2016 Supercopa MX to determine Mexico 3 of the 2017 Copa Libertadores.

== Venue ==
Due to the tournament's regulations the higher seed among both finalists during the group stage would host the final, thus Estadio León hosted the final. Nicknamed Nou Camp, the venue has been home to León since 1967, it has staged various Liga MX and Ascenso MX finals, including the first leg of the Clausura 2014 Final where León defeated Pachuca to win their second straight Liga MX title. Estadio León also hosted seven matches of the 1970 FIFA World Cup, including the quarterfinal match between West Germany and England. The stadium also hosted four Group C matches and one Round of 16 match in the 1986 FIFA World Cup.

== Background ==
León has won the tournament five times which makes them tied with América and Puebla for most of all time, while Guadalajara has won it twice. Before reaching this final, the last time León reached a final of any kind was the Clausura 2014 Liga MX season where they defeated Pachuca 4–3 to capture their second straight league title. Guadalajara last reached a final of the most previous edition of Copa MX, losing 4–2 to Puebla.

León won four, drew two during and scored 17 goals during group stage, as they were seeded first. They eliminated Cruz Azul in the quarterfinals and Atlas in the semifinals.

Guadalajara won four, drew one and lost one group stage match and scored seven goals, as they were seeded second, they eliminated Veracruz on penalty kicks in the quarterfinals and Toluca in the semifinals.

== Road to the finals ==
Note: In all results below, the score of the finalist is given first.

León		Round	Guadalajara	
Opponent	Result	Group stage	Opponent	Result
Atlético San Luis	2–1 (A)	Matchday 1	Zacatecas	2–0 (H)
Atlético San Luis	3–3 (H)	Matchday 2	Zacatecas	1–0 (A)
UAT	3–1 (A)	Matchday 3	Tepic	1–0 (A)
UAT	2–1 (H)	Matchday 4	Tepic	1–1 (H)
Monterrey	5–1 (H)	Matchday 5	Morelia	0–1 (H)
Monterrey	2–2 (A)	Matchday 6	Morelia	2–1 (A)
Group 2 winner: Pos / Team / Pld / Pts; 1 / León / 6 / 17; 2 / Atlético San Luis / 6 / 10; 3 / Monterrey / 6 / 9; 4 / UAT / 6 / 3; Updated to match(es) played on unknown. Source:		Final standings	Group 4 winner: Pos / Team / Pld / Pts; 1 / Guadalajara / 6 / 16; 2 / Morelia / 6 / 13; 3 / Tepic / 6 / 5; 4 / Zacatecas / 6 / 5; Updated to match(es) played on unknown. Source:	
Opponent	Result	Knockout stage	Opponent	Result
Cruz Azul	2–0 (H)	Quarterfinals	Veracruz	1–1 (6–5) (H)
Atlas	1–0 (H)	Semifinals	Toluca	1–0 (H)

== Match ==
4 November 2015
21:00

León	0–1	Guadalajara
	Report	Alanís 71'

Estadio León, León, Guanajuato
Attendance: 27,527
Referee: Jorge Isaac Rojas

León	Guadalajara

GK	25	(United States) William Yarbrough
DF	5	(Mexico) Fernando Navarro	(yellow card) 42'	(substituted off) 75'
DF	6	(Argentina) Diego Novaretti		(substituted off) 9'
DF	35	(Mexico) Ignacio González
DF	2	(Mexico) Efraín Velarde
MF	23	(Mexico) José Juan Vázquez
MF	27	(Mexico) Carlos Peña
MF	8	(Mexico) Elías Hernández		(substituted off) 63'
MF	10	(Mexico) Luis Montes
MF	7	(Colombia) Hernán Burbano
FW	17	(Argentina) Mauro Boselli
Substitutions:
GK	16	(Mexico) Christian Martínez
DF	4	(Mexico) Cristian Torres
DF	19	(Mexico) Jonny Magallón		(substituted on) 9'
MF	29	(Mexico) Aldo Rocha
MF	31	(Ecuador) Jonathan Gonzáles		(substituted on) 63'
FW	9	(Mexico) Miguel Sabah		(substituted on) 75'
FW	11	(Mexico) Marco Bueno
Manager:
(Spain) Juan Antonio Pizzi

GK	30	(Mexico) Rodolfo Cota	(yellow card) 44'
DF	16	(Mexico) Miguel Ángel Ponce
DF	2	(Mexico) Oswaldo Alanís
DF	28	(Mexico) Miguel Basulto
DF	15	(Mexico) Raúl López	(yellow card) 86'
MF	3	(Mexico) Carlos Salcido
MF	25	(Mexico) Michael Pérez
MF	24	(Mexico) Carlos Cisneros		(substituted off) 71'
MF	33	(Mexico) Marco Fabián	(yellow card) 13'	(substituted off) 80'
FW	7	(Mexico) Carlos Fierro	(yellow card) 26'	(substituted off) 64'
FW	9	(Mexico) Omar Bravo
Substitutions:
GK	1	(Mexico) José Antonio Rodríguez
DF	13	(Mexico) Carlos Salcedo
MF	11	(Mexico) Isaác Brizuela		(substituted on) 64'
MF	20	(Mexico) Israel Castro		(substituted on) 80'
MF	31	(Mexico) Eduardo López
FW	19	(Mexico) Michel Vázquez
FW	23	(Mexico) Ángel Zaldívar	(yellow card) 76'	(substituted on) 71'
Manager:
(Argentina) Matías Almeyda

Assistant referees:
Alberto Morin
Marvin Torrentera
Fourth official:
César Ramos

== Broadcasters ==
Mexico

- Canal 5, Claro Sports, Fox Sports 2

United States

- Azteca, ESPN Deportes, Univision Deportes Network
