= Copa MX =

Association football competition in Mexico

- Organiser(s): Liga MX; Mexican Football Federation
- Founded: 1942; 84 years ago (Professional era) as Copa México
- Abolished: 2020; 6 years ago
- Region: Mexico
- Teams: 24
- Last champions: Monterrey (3rd title)
- Most championships: América (6 titles)
- Broadcaster(s): Claro (Note: Includes Claro Sports.); ESPN (Note: Includes ESPN 2.); Fox Sports (Note: Includes Fox Sports 2.); Grupo Imagen (Note: Includes Imagen Televisión and Excélsior TV.); Televisa (Note: Includes Canal 5, Gala TV, Las Estrellas, Sky México, TDN and Univisión TDN.); TV Azteca (Note: Includes Azteca 7 and Azteca Uno.); TVC Deportes (Note: Includes TVC Deportes 2.)
- Website: www.lacopamx.net

Copa MX was a professional association football national cup in Mexico, contested by the Liga MX and Ascenso MX clubs. It was held between 1942 and 2020, and it was the first competition that included clubs from different regions of Mexico. The cup was not held during several periods (1976–1987, 1992–1994, 1997–2012), and it has been on hiatus since 2020.

Formerly known as Copa México (1942–1963, 1970–1976, 1987–1992, 1994–1997) and Copa Presidente (1963–1970). The tournament was held in 56 editions, with the inaugural season of the professional era played in 1942–43, and Moctezuma was crowned as the first champion.

Twenty-two clubs have won the title, the most successful club is América with six titles, followed by León and Puebla with five titles each, Guadalajara, Atlas, Cruz Azul and Necaxa with four titles each.

== History ==
=== Amateur era ===
==== Copa México (1932–1942) ====
After the official FMF was established in 1927 and taking control of the Campeonato de Primera Fuerza, the federation created the Copa México in 1932 as its first national cup. The trophy was donate by the Presidency of Mexico and also received official support of President Lázaro Cárdenas. The inaugural tournament was the 1932–33 Copa México, with Necaxa crowned as the first champions. This marked the beginning of the cup's amateur era, Asturias dominated the competition, winning five titles during this period. The final edition of the amateur era was held in the 1941–42 season, with Atlante crowned as the last champions.

=== Professional era ===
==== Copa México (1942–1963, 1970–1976, 1987–1992, 1994–1997) ====
The professional era of the Copa México began in 1942. At first, it was played among clubs from the Liga Mayor (currently Liga MX). Beginning in 1950 the clubs of the Segunda División were also included into the competition with the exception of the 1956–57, 1963–64, 1994–95 and 1995–96 seasons. The tournament was not held in several years (1976–1987, 1992–1994, 1997–2012), the Copa México champions also competed for the Campeón de Campeones until 1995.

==== Copa Presidente (1963–1970) ====
From 1963 to 1970, the competition was renamed as Copa Presidente, in honor of the fact that the trophy was donate by the Presidency of Mexico, Adolfo López Mateos (1963–64) and Gustavo Díaz Ordaz (1964–1970).

An unofficial and extraordinary cup tournament was held in 1963, known as Copa Presidencial Adolfo López Mateos. The tournament was played alongside the three official FMF competitions during that period (Liga Mayor, Copa México and Campeón de Campeones).

==== Copa MX (2012–2020) ====
In 2012, the competition returned with a rebranding as Copa MX, two short tournaments were played per year until 2019 (Apertura and Clausura), similar to Liga MX, except the 2019–20 Copa MX, which was played during the annual season. From 2014 to 2019, the two Copa MX champions of the year qualified for the Supercopa MX.

However, as a result of the COVID-19 pandemic, the 2020 final was postponed until November. After the 2019–20 edition, the competition was abolished due to busy calendar issues with the FMF giving preference to matches of the Mexico national football team in preparation to the 2022 FIFA World Cup.

== Competition format ==
From 2012 to 2016, in the Apertura tournament, the four Liga MX clubs qualified for the CONCACAF Champions League were not participating in the Copa MX; the remaining 14 clubs participated alongside 14 clubs from Ascenso MX. The 14 Ascenso MX clubs were the 13 top point-earners from the previous season, plus the newly relegated club. The 28 participating clubs were divided into seven groups of four clubs each. The seven group winners and the best runner-up with the highest point total qualified for the quarterfinals.

Each club played 6 matches in the group stage. Groups and home field advantage were determined by a blind draw. For the group draw, Liga MX clubs were placed in Pot A, while Ascenso MX clubs were placed in Pot B. In the home field advantage draw, no club can have more than two home games in the group stage. A blind draw determined home field advantage in the final knockout phase.

In the Clausura tournament, the 11 Liga MX clubs that did not qualify for international competitions (CONCACAF Champions League and Copa Libertadores) participated alongside the 13 Ascenso MX clubs with the highest point total from the previous short tournament. The 24 participating clubs were divided into six groups of four clubs each. The six group winners and the two best runners-up with the highest point total qualified for the quarter-finals. Both tournaments will have the same draw format and number of group matches, and the final knockout phase for both tournaments will be single-elimination.

From Apertura 2016 to Clausura 2019, the tournaments had 24 or 27 participating clubs, depending on the Liga MX clubs that qualified for the CONCACAF Champions League and also on the qualification criteria based on the clubs' positions in each division in the previous season. The participating clubs were divided into eight or nine groups with three clubs each. With 24 clubs, the eight group winners and the eight runners-up qualified for the round of 16. With 27 clubs, the nine group winners and the best seven runners-up qualified for the round of 16.

Clubs will play four matches in the group stage. Groups and home field advantage will be determined the draw by public at their annual draft. For the group draw, Liga MX clubs' top 4-point-earners and Ascenso MX clubs' top 4-point-earners will be placed in Pot A, while Liga MX clubs' mid 4-point-earners and Ascenso MX clubs' mid 4-point-earners will be placed in Pot B and Liga MX clubs' last 4-point-earners and Ascenso MX clubs' last 4-point-earners will be placed in Pot C. In the home field advantage draw, teams can have two home games in the group stage. A blind draw will determine home field advantage in the final knockout phase.

From 2014 to 2019, the two Copa MX champions qualified directly for the Supercopa MX. The 2019–20 Copa MX consisted of one tournament played during the year, according to FIFA's world footballing calendar. It has 27 participating clubs (15 from Liga MX and 12 from Ascenso MX).

== Results ==
The first national cup organized by the FMF was the 1932–33 Copa México in the amateur era.

=== Amateur era ===
Ed.	Season	Champion	Score	Runner-up
Copa México
1	1932–33	Necaxa	3–1	Germania
2	1933–34	Asturias	3–0	Necaxa
1934–35		The competition was not held		
3	1935–36	Necaxa	2–1 (a.e.t.)	Asturias
4	1936–37	Asturias	5–3	América
5	1937–38	América	3–1	Real Club España
6	1938–39	Asturias	4–1	Real Club España
7	1939–40	Asturias	1–0	Necaxa
8	1940–41	Asturias	2–2 w/o	Real Club España
9	1941–42	Atlante	5–3; 5–0	Necaxa

=== Professional era ===
Ed.	Season	Champion	Score	Runner-up	Manager
Copa México
1	1942–43	Moctezuma	5–3 (a.e.t.)	Atlante	(Spain); Eduardo Morilla
2	1943–44	Real Club España	6–2	Atlante	(Costa Rica); Rodolfo Muñoz
3	1944–45	Puebla	6–4	América	(Spain); Eduardo Morilla
4	1945–46	Atlas	5–4 (a.e.t.)	Atlante	(Argentina); Eduardo Valdatti
5	1946–47	Moctezuma	4–3	Oro	(Argentina); Julio Kaiser
6	1947–48	Veracruz	3–1	Guadalajara	(Spain); Joaquin Urquiaga
7	1948–49	León	3–0	Atlante	(Argentina); Jose Maria Casullo
8	1949–50	Atlas	3–1	Veracruz	(Argentina); Eduardo Valdatti
9	1950–51	Atlante	1–0	Guadalajara	(Mexico); Octavio Vial
10	1951–52	Atlante	Final group	Guadalajara	(Spain); Gregorio Blasco
11	1952–53	Puebla	4–1	León	(Spain); Isidro Langara
12	1953–54	América	1–1 (3–2 p)	Guadalajara	(Mexico); Octavio Vial
13	1954–55	América	1–0	Guadalajara	(Mexico); Octavio Vial
14	1955–56	Toluca	2–1	Irapuato	(Mexico); Fernando Marcos
15	1956–57	Zacatepec	1–0	León	(Mexico); Ignacio Trellez
16	1957–58	León	1–1; 5–2 (a.e.t.)	Zacatepec	(Spain); Antonio López Herranz
17	1958–59	Zacatepec	2–1	León	(Mexico); Ignacio Trellez
18	1959–60	Necaxa	4–1	Tampico	(Uruguay); Donald Ross
19	1960–61	Tampico	1–0	Toluca	(Mexico); Nicolas Palma
20	1961–62	Atlas	3–3; 1–0	Tampico	(Brazil); Jose Carlos Bauer
21	1962–63	Guadalajara	2–1	Atlante	(Mexico); Javier De la Torre
Copa Presidente
22	1963–64	América	0–0; 1–1 (5–4 p)	Monterrey	(Argentina); Alejandro Scopelli
23	1964–65	América	4–0	Morelia	(Argentina); Alejandro Scopelli
24	1965–66	Necaxa	3–3; 1–0	León	(Argentina); Miguel Marin
25	1966–67	León	2–1	Guadalajara	(Argentina); Luis Grill
26	1967–68	Atlas	2–1	Veracruz	(Argentina); Javier Novello
27	1968–69	Cruz Azul	2–1 (a.e.t.)	Monterrey	(Mexico); Raúl Cárdenas
28	1969–70	Guadalajara	3–2; 2–1	Torreón	(Mexico); Javier de la Torre
Copa México
29	1970–71	León	0–0 (10–9 p)	Zacatepec	(Mexico); Antonio Carbajal
30	1971–72	León	Final group	Zacatepec	(Mexico); Antonio Carbajal
1972–73		The competition was not held			
31	1973–74	América	2–1; 1–1	Cruz Azul	(Mexico); José Antonio Roca
32	1974–75	Pumas UNAM	Final group	Leones Negros UdeG	(Hungary); Árpád Fekete
33	1975–76	Tigres UANL	2–0; 1–2	América	(Peru); Claudio Lostaunau
1976–1987		The competition was not held			
34	1987–88	Puebla	0–0; 1–1 (a.g.)	Cruz Azul	(Uruguay); Hugo Fernández
35	1988–89	Toluca	1–1; 2–1 (a.e.t.)	Leones Negros UdeG	(Mexico); Héctor Sanabria
36	1989–90	Puebla	4–1; 0–2	Tigres UANL	(Mexico); Manuel Lapuente
37	1990–91	Leones Negros UdeG	1–0; 0–0	América	(Mexico); Alberto Guerra
38	1991–92	Monterrey	4–2	Cobras de Juárez	(Mexico); Miguel Mejía Barón
1992–1994		The competition was not held			
39	1994–95	Necaxa	2–0	Veracruz	(Mexico); Manuel Lapuente
40	1995–96	Tigres UANL	1–1; 1–0	Atlas	(Mexico); Victor Manuel Vucetich
41	1996–97	Cruz Azul	2–0	Toros Neza	(Mexico); Victor Manuel Vucetich
1997–2012		The competition was not held			
Copa MX
42	Ape–2012	Dorados de Sinaloa	2–2 (3–2 p)	Correcaminos UAT	(Mexico); Francisco Javier Ramírez
43	Cla–2013	Cruz Azul	0–0 (4–2 p)	Atlante	(Mexico); Guillermo Vázquez
44	Ape–2013	Monarcas Morelia	3–3 (3–1 p)	Atlas	(Argentina); Carlos Bustos
45	Cla–2014	Tigres UANL	3–0	Alebrijes de Oaxaca	(Brazil); Ricardo Ferretti
46	Ape–2014	Santos Laguna	2–2 (4–2 p)	Puebla	(Portugal); Pedro Caixinha
47	Cla–2015	Puebla	4–2	Guadalajara	(Mexico); José Guadalupe Cruz
48	Ape–2015	Guadalajara	1–0	León	(Argentina); Matías Almeyda
49	Cla–2016	Veracruz	4–1	Necaxa	(Chile); Carlos Reinoso
50	Ape–2016	Querétaro	0–0 (3–2 p)	Guadalajara	(Mexico); Víctor Manuel Vucetich
51	Cla–2017	Guadalajara	0–0 (3–1 p)	Monarcas Morelia	(Argentina); Matías Almeyda
52	Ape–2017	Monterrey	1–0	Pachuca	(Argentina); Antonio Mohamed
53	Cla–2018	Necaxa	1–0	Toluca	(Mexico); Ignacio Ambríz
54	Ape–2018	Cruz Azul	2–0	Monterrey	(Portugal); Pedro Caixinha
55	Cla–2019	América	1–0	Juárez	(Mexico); Miguel Herrera
56	2019–20	Monterrey	1–0; 1–1	Tijuana	(Argentina); Antonio Mohamed

== Performances ==
Rank	Club	Titles	Runner-up	Seasons
1	América	6	3	1953–54, 1954–55, 1963–64, 1964–65, 1973–74, Cla–2019
2	León	5	5	1948–49, 1957–58, 1966–67, 1970–71, 1971–72
2	Puebla	5	1	1944–45, 1952–53, 1987–88, 1989–90, Cla–2015
4	Guadalajara	4	8	1962–63, 1969–70, Ape–2015, Cla–2017
4	Atlas	4	2	1945–46, 1949–50, 1961–62, 1967–68
4	Cruz Azul	4	2	1968–69, 1996–97, Cla–2013, Ape–2018
4	Necaxa	4	1	1959–60, 1965–66, 1994–95, Cla–2018
8	Monterrey	3	3	1991–92, Ape–2017, 2019–20
8	Tigres UANL	3	1	1975–76, 1995–96, Cla–2014
10	Atlante	2	6	1950–51, 1951–52
10	Veracruz^{1}	2	3	1947–48, Cla–2016
10	Zacatepec	2	3	1956–57, 1958–59
10	Toluca	2	2	1955–56, 1988–89
10	Moctezuma^{1}	2	0	1942–43, 1946–47
15	Tampico^{1}	1	2	1960–61
15	Leones Negros UdeG	1	2	1990–91
15	Monarcas Morelia	1	2	Ape–2013
15	Real Club España^{1}	1	0	1943–44
15	Pumas UNAM	1	0	1974–75
15	Dorados de Sinaloa	1	0	Ape–2012
15	Santos Laguna	1	0	Ape–2014
15	Querétaro	1	0	Ape–2016
23	Oro	0	1	—
23	Irapuato	0	1	—
23	Torreón^{1}	0	1	—
23	Cobras de Juárez^{1}	0	1	—
23	Toros Neza	0	1	—
23	Correcaminos UAT	0	1	—
23	Alebrijes de Oaxaca	0	1	—
23	Pachuca	0	1	—
23	Juárez	0	1	—
23	Tijuana	0	1	—

Notes

1. Defunct.

== See also ==
- Sport in Mexico
- Football in Mexico
- Mexican Football Federation
- Liga MX
- Supercopa MX
- Campeón de Campeones
- Copa MX Femenil
