= U.D. Moctezuma de Orizaba =

Mexican football club

Moctezuma de Orizaba
- Full name: Unión Deportiva Moctezuma de Orizaba
- Nickname: Cerveceros (Brewers)
- Founded: 1932; 94 years ago (as Club Moctezuma de Orizaba)
- Dissolved: 1950; 76 years ago
- Ground: Estadio Moctezuma; Orizaba, Veracruz
- League: Primera División de México
Home colours	Away colours

Unión Deportiva Moctezuma de Orizaba, simply known as Moctezuma was a Mexican football club based in Orizaba, Veracruz. Founded in 1932 as Club Moctezuma de Orizaba, the club played in the amateur era of Liga Mayor from 1940 to 1943, and later participated in the professional era of Liga Mayor from 1943 to 1950. Also played in the Liga Amateur de Veracruz.

== History ==
The club was founded in 1932 by workers from the Moctezuma brewery in Orizaba, Veracruz. The club was created to play sports in their spare time and once the owner of the brewery saw the men he decided to sponsor the club and so the club took on the brewery name Club Moctezuma de Orizaba and joined the amateur league in Veracruz.

Moctezuma de Orizaba is remembered for being the first club from Veracruz to play in the amateur league in Mexico City, when they joined the league in 1940.

== Honours ==
=== Top division ===
- Copa México
  - Champions (2): 1942–43, 1946–47
- Campeón de Campeones
  - Champions (1): 1947
  - Runners-up (1): 1943

=== Amateur ===
- Liga Amateur de Veracruz: 1937–38

== See also ==
- Football in Mexico
- Albinegros de Orizaba
- Works team
