= C.D. Marte =

Mexican football club

Marte
- Full name: Club Deportivo Marte
- Nickname: Los Marcianos (The Martians)
- Founded: 1928; 98 years ago 1992; 34 years ago (refounded as Marte Morelos)
- Dissolved: 2001; 25 years ago
- Ground: Estadio Centenario; Cuernavaca, Morelos
- Capacity: 13,500
Home colours	Away colours

Club Deportivo Marte was a Mexican football club based in Cuernavaca, Morelos. The club competed in the Campeonato de Primera Fuerza (later renamed Liga Mayor), Mexico's former top amateur league, from 1928 to 1943, before joining the Primera División de México (now Liga MX) until 1955. Founded in Mexico City in 1928, the club was relocated to Cuernavaca in 1953 before being dissolved three years later. It was refounded in 1992 as Marte Morelos, and subsequently renamed as Potros Marte Pegaso, and was dissolved again in 2001.

== History ==
The club was founded in Mexico City in 1928, but it was relocated to Cuernavaca, Morelos in 1953. The early club mainly consisted of Mexican soldiers, hence the name, in homage of the Roman god of war.

=== Amateur era ===
The first tournament played by the club was during the 1928–29 season. In the early era, the club won two of its three titles.

==== First title ====
The first title came in the 1928–29 season, its first year. The club finished with 14 points from 8 matches, with a total of 7 victories and only 1 loss (at the time there were 2 points for a victory). The club made up a part of the Mexico national team in the 1930 FIFA World Cup in Uruguay.

	Club	J	G	E	P	Pts
1	Marte FC	8	7	0	1	14
2	España FC	8	6	1	1	13
3	América	8	5	1	2	11
4	Atlante	8	5	0	3	10
5	Necaxa	8	5	0	3	10
6	Asturias	8	3	1	4	7
7	Germania	8	2	0	6	4
8	Aurrerá	8	0	2	6	2
9	México FC	8	0	1	7	1

2001 badge

== Honours ==
=== Top division ===
- Primera División de México
  - Champions (1): 1953–54
- Campeón de Campeones
  - Champions (2): 1943, 1954

=== Promotion division ===
- Segunda División de México
  - Champions (1): Verano 2000
  - Runners-up (1): Verano 1999

=== Amateur ===
- Campeonato de Primera Fuerza/Liga Mayor: 1928–29, 1942–43

== See also ==
- Football in Mexico
