= Atlante F.C. =

Association football club in Mexico

Atlante
- Full name: Atlante Fútbol Club S.A. de C.V.
- Nicknames: Los Potros de Hierro (The Iron Colts); Los Azulgranas (The Blue-and-Garnets); El Equipo del Pueblo (The People's Team); Los Prietitos
- Short name: ATL
- Founded: 18 April 1916; 110 years ago (as Sinaloa); 1921; 105 years ago (as Atlante)
- Stadium: Estadio Azteca
- Capacity: 87,523
- Owner: Grupo Dequivamed
- President: Emilio Escalante
- Manager: Miguel Herrera
- League: Liga MX
- Clausura 2026: Liga de Expansión MX; Regular phase: 8th of 15; Final phase: Quarter-finals
- Website: www.atlantefutbol.com
Home colours	Away colours

Atlante Fútbol Club is a professional football club based in Mexico City. The club competes in Liga MX, the highest level of Mexican football, and plays its home matches at Estadio Azteca. Founded in 1916 as Sinaloa, the club was renamed as Lusitania, U-53 (in reference to a German submarine), and Atlántico (linked to the Atlantic Ocean). Due to widespread colloquial use, the club adopted its current name in 1921. It was one of ten founding clubs of the professional era of the Liga Mayor (current Liga MX) in the 1943–44 season.

In domestic competitions, Atlante FC has won three Primera División titles, two Copa México titles and one Campeón de Campeones. In international competitions, the club has won the CONCACAF Champions Cup twice.

Throughout its history, Atlante has been relegated three times, the most recent in the Clausura 2014 tournament, then the club competed for twelve years in the second level leagues. In 2026, Atlante returned to the top level by acquiring the Mazatlán franchise's place in the Liga MX and the club also returned to Mexico City.

== History ==
=== The beginning ===
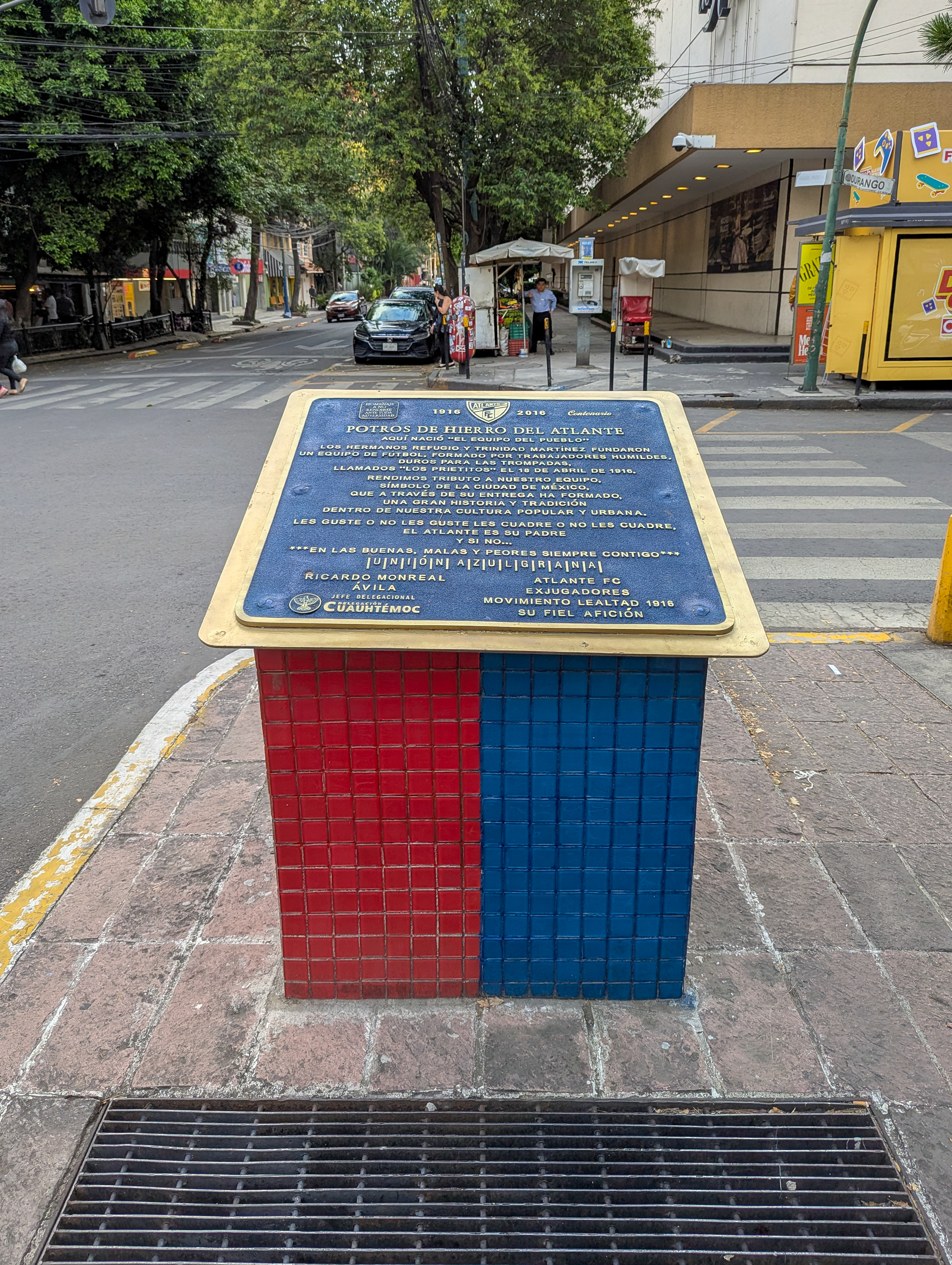
Commemorative plaque unveiled in 2016 about the founding of Atlante Fútbol Club on 18 April 1916. The plaque is located at the intersection of Valladolid and Durango streets, colonia Roma.

Atlante was founded on 18 April 1916, with the name Sinaloa by a group of young Mexican football enthusiasts, led by Refugio "El Vaquero" Martínez. The team began playing in the La Condesa neighborhood in Mexico City. After changing its name to Lusitania and U-53, Refugio Martínez proposed the name Atlante, after the mighty battles fought at the Atlantic Ocean during World War I. During the 1920s, players such as the Rosas brothers, Manuel "Chaquetas" Rosas and Felipe "Diente" Rosas, as well as Juan "El Trompo" Carreño, helped Atlante to become one of the most popular teams, mostly among the working classes, which led to its most famous and legendary nickname, El Equipo del Pueblo, "People's team". Atlante's legend Juan Carreño scored Mexico's first goal in the Olympic Games in Amsterdam 1928, as well as Mexico national team's first ever goal in a FIFA World Cup during the inaugural match against France in Uruguay 1930.

Despite its popularity, the Federación Mexicana de Fútbol (FMF) did not allow the team to be involved in the Mexican championship, the Liga Mayor. For Atlante to be allowed into the league, it had to win several proof-matches against Toluca and América, two powerful football clubs. The duels were won by Atlante with scores of 7–2 and 2–1, respectively. Accepted within the Liga Mayor, Atlante formed a major rivalry against Necaxa, which became the first classic in Mexican football. The games between these two were furious battles, even drawing in points at the end of the 1931–32 tournament.

During the early years of football in Mexico, when famed foreign teams began to challenge the Mexican teams they swept most clubs except one: Atlante. What many do not recall today is that Atlante was the first Mexican team that acquired national fame by knocking down those foreign "giants". In 1929, Atlante defeated Sabaria of Hungary 3–1. In 1930, Atlante twice defeated Sportivo of Buenos Aires, 2–1 and 3–2. One of their more recalled feats was the 3–2 victory in 1931 over Bella Vista of Uruguay, which had three players from the team that won the first World Cup a year before in Montevideo.

In the 1940s, during the final years of World War II, Atlante's Horacio Casarín began being noticed for his tremendous skill and ability, which also led him to become a major figure in the Mexico national team.

Atlante's popularity, continued to grow after the team was portrayed on the big screen in many films of Mexico's golden era of cinema. Some of those films are "Los Hijos de Don Venancio", "Los Nietos de Don Venancio", "El Vividor", "El que con niños se acuesta", among many others. Players Horacio Casarín and Martí Ventolrà were even part of those films' casting.

=== Professional era and first championship title ===
In 1943, the Federación Mexicana de Fútbol founded the Professional League with six clubs of the Primera Fuerza of Mexico City, two clubs from the Liga Occidental (Western League) and two members from the Liga Veracruzana (Veracruz League), being Atlante one of those six clubs of Mexico City. Together, they all became what is known today as the Primera División de México.

After 4 tournaments, and with the aid of its owner General Jose Manuel Nuñez (a retired militar asked personally by former president Lázaro Cárdenas to watch over the team) as well as of its sensational player Horacio Casarín, the team obtained its first championship in the 1946–47 season. The final match against León was attended by 48,622 people, including President Miguel Alemán Valdés (he even got onto the field after the match in a famous photograph with the champions). Before that, in 1945, the team imposed the Latin American record for more goals in a single season with 121 goals in 30 matches (more than four goals per game). Atlante also became the first Mexican team to be crowned at the Champion of Champions cup (a Super Cup scheme championship) during the 1941–42 season.

After the first title, several other teams dominated the championship; nevertheless, Atlante remained as a powerful rival and still a popular team for the working classes, along with its runner-up in the Copa México and the Champion of Champions titles in the early 1950s. In 1966, General Jose Manuel Nuñez decided to sell the team to Fernando González, "Fernandón". Poor level and irregular campaigns proceeded the selling, which led Atlante to be relegated from the Primera División to the Segunda División de México in 1976.

=== The IMSS era ===
The team managed to return to the Primera División for the 1977–78 season. In October 1978, the Instituto Mexicano del Seguro Social (IMSS) acquired the team in a 100% ownership, promising to make the largest football club in the world with 22 million associates throughout the country. With the financial support of the governmental institution, the team experienced successful campaigns with reinforcements such as the old-time idol Horacio Casarín as head coach and the Mexican football's all-time top goalscorer Cabinho, who would become three-time champion striker with Atlante in 1980, 1981 and 1982. Its productive campaigns led them to the 1981–82 final championship match against Tigres UANL, and after regular and extra time, Atlante became runner-up at penalty kicks. Nevertheless, a year later Atlante won its first continental title with the CONCACAF Champions' Cup against Suriname's Robinhood.

Although the government still owned the team, another institution took over the management activities. The Departamento del Distrito Federal, DDF (the former body which controlled the Mexican Federal District) intended to propel the team with little results. After playing for several years at the Estadio Azteca, the team even had to leave this venue and setting its new battleground at the Estadio Ciudad de los Deportes.

In 1989, the DDF sold the team to José Antonio García, a businessman owner of the sporting goods and apparel company Garcis. After a failed campaign at a new venue, this time at the Estadio Corregidora located in the city of Querétaro and the Querétaro franchise's home stadium, the team was relegated again to the Segunda División.

=== Second championship ===
Right from its ashes, and back to its homeground Estadio Ciudad de los Deportes, now re-baptized as the Estadio Azulgrana, Atlante managed to make an incredible come back to the Primera División, after 3 games against Pachuca in the final series for the Segunda División Championship. After the series' end, which led to extra time, penalty kicks, and sudden death, Atlante's goalkeeper Félix Fernández scored the last penalty kick for a 9–8 final score.

In the 1992–93 season, and guided by Ricardo La Volpe, Atlante obtained its second championship title against Monterrey, with the final match played at Monterrey's home stadium, Estadio Tecnológico in Monterrey, Nuevo León. Atlante's new legends from that championship title included: 2011 U-17 champion coach Raúl Gutiérrez, Felix Fernández, former Atlante coaches Miguel Herrera, José Guadalupe Cruz, and René Isidoro García, Pedro Massacessi, Wilson Graneolatti, Roberto Andrade, Guillermo Cantú, and feared strikers Luis Miguel Salvador and Daniel Guzmán. The team was crowned as champion for the second time in 45 years. By winning the title, Atlante was again able to access the Concacaf Champions Cup, which they eventually lost against Cartaginés of Costa Rica in the final.

After winning the championship title, Atlante was eliminated for the next years from the play-off stage, even with important acquisitions such as Hugo Sánchez, Jorge Campos, Venezuelan player Gabriel Miranda, among others. Once again, the team faced relegation issues; therefore, Grupo Televisa decided to acquire Atlante and move it back again to the Estadio Azteca. With this boost, Atlante was able to be reinforced by notable players, such as Zague, Martín Felix Ubaldi, José Damasceno Tiba, and Luis García, as well as the renamed coach Miguel Mejía Barón, who just had a positive result coaching the national team at World Cup 1994. Despite having memorable campaigns, such as being the first all-championship leader for a short tournament (Invierno 1996), and qualifying for the play-offs in the Verano 1997 and the Invierno 1997, the team did not accomplish any major results, and even had disastrous moments such as the embarrassing play-off series against Toros Neza in the Verano 1997, which was lost in a 9–2 global score.

=== The third "relegation" era ===
Several issues occurred in Atlante's history during the last years of the 20th century, those very issues that were going to define the team's future. Inexperienced head coaches (Zlatko Petricevic, Angel Cappa, Roberto Saporitti, and Eduardo Rergis) arriving to the team, weak and vain players, and even a short decision in changing the main uniform's colors of red and blue to orange, made the team and its followers to feel without identity. Fans began switching into other successful teams, and Atlante's local matches began to feel desolated. Awful and boring matches, poorish skill level and players without a real commitment to the team, led Atlante to face again relegation issues to the Segunda División, now transformed into the Primera División 'A' de México.

Manuel Lapuente, who had recently succeeded with the national team at the 1998 World Cup, had the responsibility to guide the team throughout the Verano 2001 tournament and save the team of an imminent relegation: at the end, Lapuente and his players did not accomplish the goal. However, a ray of light appeared, since the Federación Mexicana de Fútbol was looking to expand the Primera División with 2 new teams. After paying a 5 million dollar fee, Atlante was allowed to play a promotion series of matches against the Primera División 'A's runner-up, Tiburones Rojos de Veracruz. Atlante won the series 4–1, allowing them to remain in the top division as one of the new expansion teams.

=== The rebirth of atlantismo ===
After breaking up its relationship with Televisa and Alejandro Burillo Azcárraga (owner of telecomm's company Pegaso) being the sole owner, the youth level program has been developed as the main focus, which has made Atlante the team with most youth debuts at the Primera División since 2000. First Carlos Reinoso, then Miguel Herrera, managed to build a team with players such as Sebastián "Chamagol" González, Luis Gabriel Rey, and goalie Federico Vilar, the team returned to the playoffs, arriving in three quarter-final and two semi-final stages. The team had a failed relocation to the Estadio Azulgrana Neza 86 in Ciudad Nezahualcóyotl, State of Mexico, Toros Neza's home stadium, and back again to the Estadio Azteca.

Former players (now head coaches) René Isidoro García and José Guadalupe Cruz struggled to maintain the spirit, strength, and skill of this Atlante's new era. The lack of attendance at their home matches remained as the major problem of the team, due to Mexico City teams' lack of attendance at local matches, as well as both the irregular football level and the lack of identity for the team.

=== The third crown at Quintana Roo ===
On 14 May 2007, Atlante officially left the Estadio Azteca because its games there were not profitable, largely due to poor attendance. They hoped that the relocation to the Estadio Andrés Quintana Roo in Cancún, Quintana Roo, would regrow its popularity and improve attendance. In a fantastic tournament, Atlante adapted quickly to its new venue and began winning important matches, either at home or visiting. Following a tough play-off against Cruz Azul and Guadalajara, Atlante faced Pumas UNAM for the title's final series. On 9 December 2007, only five months after arriving at its new venue, and after a great series of matches played by goalie Federico Vilar, as well as remarkable matches of Giancarlo Maldonado, Gabriel Pereyra, Javier Muñoz, José Joel "El Chicharo" González and Clemente Ovalle (who scored the championship goal, four minutes before the end of the game), Atlante earned its third championship, growing back its popularity nationwide and especially at its new home city, Cancún.

Atlante won the Apertura 2007 Championship and by doing so, it qualified to the CONCACAF Champions' Cup 2008, where they were eliminated by Costa Rican Saprissa in the quarter-finals. By winning its title, Atlante qualified as well to the SuperLiga 2008, where they were eliminated by the New England Revolution at the semi-final stage. Atlante joined Santos Laguna, Cruz Azul, and Pumas UNAM at the CONCACAF Champions League in its inaugural season 2008–09, where they reached the final match against Cruz Azul. Atlante won the series 2–0, thus being crowned as CONCACAF Club Champion and earning the right to play at the 2009 FIFA Club World Cup in Abu Dhabi, United Arab Emirates.

=== The return to international spotlight ===
Along with the FIFA Club World Championship, Atlante was invited to replace Celtic at the Peace Cup in Andalucia, Spain, where it faced Málaga and Aston Villa. Atlante was soon eliminated with a single-goal difference against eventual champions Aston Villa.

Atlante acquired Santiago Solari to reinforce the team. He was the last major figure since Hugo Sánchez's acquisition in 1995, and joined a select group of major international players to play for the club: Grzegorz Lato, Ruben "Ratón" Ayala, Ricardo La Volpe, Cabinho, Miodrag Belodedici, Ilie Dumitrescu, and Faustino Asprilla.

At the 2009 FIFA Club World Cup, Atlante defeated Auckland City 3–0 at the quarter-final stage. For its next stop at semi-finals, it faced Barcelona in a curious match featuring two Mexicans with the same name, Rafael Márquez Álvarez of Barcelona and Rafael Márquez Lugo of Atlante, and two teams with the same jersey colors. FIFA eventually ruled out Barcelona to play with the blue-and-red stripes over Atlante. Atlante led the match at the fourth minute, but the final score was a 3–1 defeat. For the third-place match, Atlante was defeated by Pohang Steelers in a penalty shootout, missing two of their four shots, and finishing in fourth place.

=== Relegation and promotion ===
Atlante entered the new decade burdened by relegation battles, a turbulent stretch that ultimately culminated in their drop to the Liga de Ascenso de México at the end of the Clausura 2014 tournament. Once there, however, the club rediscovered its ambition, reaching the finals in both the Apertura 2015 and Apertura 2016 tournaments.

In April 2020, the Liga de Ascenso was dissolved and replaced by the newly formed Liga de Expansión MX — a restructuring that eliminated the possibility of promotion to the top flight. Two months later, the club was relocated back to Mexico City, making the Estadio Ciudad de los Deportes their new home stadium. In the Guardianes 2020 tournament, Atlante once again advanced to a final, where they fell to Tampico-Madero.

Over the following years, the club appeared in four finals, winning three championships – Apertura 2021, Apertura 2022, and Clausura 2024 – establishing themselves as the most successful side in the league. In December 2024, Atlante was relocated for the fifth time, this time settling in Zacatepec, Morelos.

In April 2026, Atlante secured their return to the Primera División de México by acquiring Mazatlán's franchise and taking its place in the league. The club was relocated once again to Mexico City, with the Estadio Azteca becoming their new home stadium. Miguel Herrera was appointed as the team's new head coach, entrusted with leading the team into a new era.

== Honours ==
Domestic
Type	Competition	Titles	Seasons	Runners-up
Top level FMF	Liga MX	3	1946–47, 1992–93, Ape–2007	1945–46, 1949–50, 1950–51, 1981–82
Top level FMF	Copa MX	2	1950–51, 1951–52	1942–43, 1943–44, 1945–46, 1948–49, 1962–63, Cla–2013
Top level FMF	Campeón de Campeones	1	1952	1947, 1951
Lower levels FMF	Liga de Expansión MX	3	Ape–2021, Ape–2022, Cla–2024	Guard–2020, Ape–2023
Lower levels FMF	Campeón de Campeones Liga de Expansión MX	1	2022	2023, 2024
Lower levels FMF	Ascenso MX	0	—	Ape–2015, Ape–2016
Lower levels FMF	Segunda División	2	1976–77, 1990–91	—
International
Type	Competition	Titles	Seasons	Runners-up
Continental CONCACAF	CONCACAF Champions Cup	2	1983, 2008–09	1994

Notes

- record

== International record ==
Season	Competition	Round	Club	Home	Away	Aggregate
1983	CONCACAF Champions' Cup	First round	(Guatemala) Comunicaciones	2–0	2–2	4–2
1983	CONCACAF Champions' Cup	Second round	(United States) New York Pancyprian-Freedoms	3–2	1–1	4–3
1983	CONCACAF Champions' Cup	Third round	(Guatemala) Suchitepéquez	6–0	2–2	8–2
1983	CONCACAF Champions' Cup	Final	(Suriname) Robinhood	5–0	1–1	6–1
1994	CONCACAF Champions' Cup	First round	(El Salvador) Firpo	2–1	4–1	6–2
1994	CONCACAF Champions' Cup	Second round	(Costa Rica) Herediano	3–1	3–3	6–4
1994	CONCACAF Champions' Cup	Semi-finals	(El Salvador) Alianza	2–1		
1994	CONCACAF Champions' Cup	Final	(Costa Rica) Cartaginés	2–3		
2008	CONCACAF Champions' Cup	Quarter-finals	(Costa Rica) Saprissa	2–1	0–3	2–4
2008	SuperLiga	Group A	(United States) Houston Dynamo	0–4		2nd
2008	SuperLiga	Group A	(United States) D.C. United	3–2		2nd
2008	SuperLiga	Group A	(Mexico) Guadalajara	2–0		2nd
2008	SuperLiga	Semi-finals	(United States) New England Revolution	0–1		
2009	CONCACAF Champions League	Group C	(Honduras) Olimpia	1–0	1–1	1st
2009	CONCACAF Champions League	Group C	(Canada) Montreal Impact	2–1	0–0	1st
2009	CONCACAF Champions League	Group C	(Trinidad and Tobago) Joe Public	2–0	0–1	1st
2009	CONCACAF Champions League	Quarter-finals	(United States) Houston Dynamo	3–0	1–1	4–1
2009	CONCACAF Champions League	Semi-finals	(Mexico) Santos Laguna	3–1	1–2	4–3
2009	CONCACAF Champions League	Final	(Mexico) Cruz Azul	0–0	2–0	2–0
2009	2009 FIFA Club World Cup	Quarter-finals	(New Zealand) Auckland City	3–0		
2009	2009 FIFA Club World Cup	Semi-finals	(Spain) Barcelona	1–3		
2009	2009 FIFA Club World Cup	Third place	(South Korea) Pohang Steelers	1–1 (3–4 p)		

== Personnel ==
=== Management ===
Position	Staff
President	(Mexico) Emilio Escalante
Vice President	(Mexico) Emilio Escalante García
Director of football	(Mexico) Jorge Santillana
Sporting coordinator	(Mexico) Alfonso Rippa
Director of academy	(Mexico) Armando Muñoz

Source: Liga MX

=== Coaching staff ===
Position	Staff
Manager	(Mexico) Miguel Herrera
Assistant managers	(Mexico) Álvaro Galindo (Mexico) Óscar Escobar (Argentina) Federico Vilar
Fitness coach	(Mexico) Marco Hideroa
Goalkeeper coach	(Mexico) Guillermo Velazquez
Physiotherapist	(Mexico) Sergio Rojas
Team doctors	(Mexico) Ramón Gómez (Mexico) Jesús González

== Players ==
=== First-team squad ===
As of 14 August 2026

Note: Flags indicate national team as defined under FIFA eligibility rules; some limited exceptions apply. Players may hold more than one non-FIFA nationality.

No.	Pos.	Nation	Player
1	GK	MEX	Óscar Jiménez
3	DF	MEX	Gustavo Sánchez
4	DF	MEX	Eduardo Tercero
5	MF	MEX	Hardy Meza
6	DF	USA	Nico Carrera
7	MF	ECU	Jhojan Julio (on loan from Tijuana)
8	MF	MEX	Eugenio Pizzuto (on loan from UANL)
9	FW	MEX	Luis Puente (on loan from Pachuca)
10	MF	MEX	Octavio Vázquez (on loan from Tijuana)
11	FW	MEX	Joaquín Moxica (on loan from Monterrey)
13	MF	MEX	Maximiliano García
14	DF	MEX	Cristóbal Alfaro (on loan from Pachuca)
15	FW	ECU	Jairón Charcopa (on loan from LDU Quito)
16	FW	MEX	Daniel González (on loan from UNAM)
17	MF	MEX	Leonardo Mejía

No.	Pos.	Nation	Player
18	MF	MEX	Christian Bermúdez
19	MF	MEX	Luis Calzadilla
20	DF	MEX	Gilberto Adame
21	MF	MEX	Javier Ibarra
22	GK	MEX	Roberto Barragán
24	FW	MEX	Ari Contreras (on loan from Pachuca)
25	MF	URU	Martín Fernández (on loan from Newell's Old Boys)
27	DF	MEX	Armando Escobar
29	DF	USA	Walter Portales
30	MF	ARG	Martín Sarrafiore
32	DF	ECU	Diogo Bagüí (on loan from Tijuana)
33	GK	COL	Jordan García (on loan from León)
34	MF	MEX	Édgar Jiménez
37	DF	PAR	Walter Clar
44	DF	ARG	Aarón Quirós (on loan from Vélez Sarsfield)

=== Youth squad ===
Note: Flags indicate national team as defined under FIFA eligibility rules; some limited exceptions apply. Players may hold more than one non-FIFA nationality.

No. / Pos. / Nation / Player; 184 / FW / MEX / Rubén Coubert	No. / Pos. / Nation / Player; 199 / DF / MEX / Santiago García

== Player records ==
=== Retired numbers ===
- 12 – (Mexico) Félix Fernández, Goalkeeper (1989–98, 1999–01, 2002–03)

=== Top goalscorers ===
(Mexico) Dionisio "Nicho" Mejía	1927–28
(Mexico) Juan Carreño	1931–32
(Mexico) Alberto "Caballo" Mendoza	1939–40
(Spain) Martí Ventolrà	1941–42
(Mexico) Bernardo "Manolete" Hernández	1967–68
(Brazil) Cabinho	1979–80
(Brazil) Cabinho	1980–81
(Brazil) Cabinho	1981–82
(Mexico) Luis García	1997 Invierno
(Colombia) Luis Gabriel Rey	2003 Apertura
(Peru) Johan Fano	2010 Bicentenario
(Chile) Esteban Paredes	2012 Apertura
(Venezuela) Giancarlo Maldonado	2014 Apertura
(Ecuador) Carlos Garcés	2015 Apertura

== Managers ==
- (Hungary) Árpád Fekete (1978–79)
- (Mexico) Horacio Casarín (1981–84)
- (Argentina) Juan Carlos Lorenzo (1982), (1983)
- (Mexico) Ignacio Trelles (1983–85)
- (Mexico) José Antonio Roca (1985–87)
- (Argentina) Ricardo La Volpe (1988–89)
- (Mexico) Rafael Puente (1989–90)
- (Argentina) Ricardo La Volpe (1 July 1991 – 28 January 1996)
- (Mexico) Javier Aguirre (1 February 1996 – 30 June 1996)
- (Mexico) Miguel Mejía Barón (1996–98)
- (Argentina) Juan Andrés Sarulyte (1998–99)
- (Argentina) Ángel Cappa (1 January 1999 – 30 June 1999)
- (Mexico) Eduardo Rergis (2000)
- (Argentina) Roberto Saporiti (21 September 2000 – 31 December 2000)
- (Mexico) Manuel Lapuente (1 January 2001 – 30 June 2001)
- (Chile) Carlos Reinoso (2001–02)
- (Mexico) Miguel Herrera (16 February 2002 – 30 June 2004)
- (Mexico) José Guadalupe Cruz (1 July 2004 – 18 September 2005)
- (Argentina) Pedro Monzón (1 January 2005 – 30 June 2005)
- (Mexico) Sergio Bueno (24 September 2005 – 31 December 2005)
- (Mexico) René Isidoro García (1 January 2006 – 31 December 2006)
- (Mexico) José Guadalupe Cruz (1 January 2007 – 30 June 2010)
- (Mexico) René Isidoro García (1 July 2010 – 13 September 2010)
- (Argentina) Eduardo Bacas (13 September 2010 – 31 December 2010)
- (Mexico) Miguel Herrera (1 January 2011 – 31 December 2011)
- (Mexico) Mario García (1 January 2012 – 17 April 2012)
- (Mexico) José Luis González (interim) (17 April 2012 – 7 May 2012)
- (Argentina) Ricardo La Volpe (1 July 2012 – 28 January 2013)
- (Mexico) Daniel Guzmán (30 January 2013 – 30 June 2013)
- (Uruguay) Wilson Graniolatti (1 July 2013 – 2 September 2013)
- (Argentina) Andrés Carevic (interim) (3 September 2013 – 8 September 2013)
- (Uruguay) Rubén Israel (9 September 2013 – 12 January 2014)
- (Argentina) Pablo Marini (13 January 2014)
- (Argentina) Gabriel Pereyra / (Mexico) Gaston Obeledo (2014–2015)
- (Uruguay) Wilson Graniolatti (2015)
- (Mexico) Eduardo Fentanes (2015–2017)
- (Mexico) Raúl Gutiérrez (2017)
- (Mexico) Eduardo Rergis (interim) (2017)
- (Mexico) Sergio Bueno (2017–2018)
- (Argentina) Gabriel Pereyra (2018–2019)
- (Mexico) Alex Diego (2019–2020)
- (Mexico) Mario García (2020–2023)
- (Mexico) Daniel Alcántar (2023–2024)
- (Mexico) Miguel de Jesús Fuentes (2025)
- (Mexico) Ricardo Carbajal (2026)
- (Mexico) Miguel Herrera (2026–)

=== Champion managers ===
- (Hungary) Luis Grocz (1946–47)
- (Argentina) Ricardo La Volpe (1992–93)
- (Mexico) José Guadalupe Cruz (Apertura 2007)

== Stadium ==
In November 2024, Atlante's board began to have conflicts with the Cosío family, owner of the Estadio Ciudad de los Deportes, after the venue was closed by the civil protection authorities of the Benito Juárez borough due to the holding of two mass events on the same day at the stadium and at the Plaza de Toros México, something that directly affected the Potros even though they were not part of either event. This forced Atlante to finish the 2024 Apertura tournament at alternate venues, playing its last regular phase match at the Cantera de los Pumas of UNAM, and hosting its home matches during the liguilla at the Estadio Hidalgo in Pachuca.
