= List of C.F. Pachuca records and statistics =

This is a list of C.F. Pachuca records and statistics, in all domestic and international competitions.

== Competitive record in domestic league ==
Position	Tournament	GP	W	D	L	GF	GA	DIF	PTS	Last playoff (liguilla) placement
0	1943/44	0	0	0	0	0	0	0	0	
0	1944/45	0	0	0	0	0	0	0	0	
0	1945/46	0	0	0	0	0	0	0	0	
0	1946/47	0	0	0	0	0	0	0	0	
0	1947/48	0	0	0	0	0	0	0	0	
0	1948/49	0	0	0	0	0	0	0	0	
0	1949/50	0	0	0	0	0	0	0	0	
0	1950/51	0	0	0	0	0	0	0	0	
0	1951/52	0	0	0	0	0	0	0	0	
0	1952/53	0	0	0	0	0	0	0	0	
0	1953/54	0	0	0	0	0	0	0	0	
0	1954/55	0	0	0	0	0	0	0	0	
0	1955/56	0	0	0	0	0	0	0	0	
0	1956/57	0	0	0	0	0	0	0	0	
0	1957/58	0	0	0	0	0	0	0	0	
0	1958/59	0	0	0	0	0	0	0	0	
0	1959/60	0	0	0	0	0	0	0	0	
0	1960/61	0	0	0	0	0	0	0	0	
0	1961/62	0	0	0	0	0	0	0	0	
0	1962/63	0	0	0	0	0	0	0	0	
0	1963/64	0	0	0	0	0	0	0	0	
0	1964/65	0	0	0	0	0	0	0	0	
0	1965/66	0	0	0	0	0	0	0	0	
0	1966/67	0	0	0	0	0	0	0	0	
12	1967/68	30	8	8	14	37	52	−15	24	First Promotion (Victory 2 points)
10	1968/69	30	11	6	3	49	51	−2	28	
8	1969/70	30	11	7	12	41	49	−8	29	
16	1970/71	34	11	7	16	38	46	−8	29	
12	1971/72	34	10	3	11	38	46	−8	33	
18	1972/73	34	9	6	19	40	68	−28	24	
0	1973/74	0	0	0	0	0	0	0	0	First Relegation
0	1974/75	0	0	0	0	0	0	0	0	
0	1975/76	0	0	0	0	0	0	0	0	
0	1976/77	0	0	0	0	0	0	0	0	
0	1977/78	0	0	0	0	0	0	0	0	
0	1978/79	0	0	0	0	0	0	0	0	
0	1979/80	0	0	0	0	0	0	0	0	
0	1980/81	0	0	0	0	0	0	0	0	
0	1981/82	0	0	0	0	0	0	0	0	
0	1982/83	0	0	0	0	0	0	0	0	
0	1983/84	0	0	0	0	0	0	0	0	
0	1984/85	0	0	0	0	0	0	0	0	
0	1985/86	0	0	0	0	0	0	0	0	
0	1986/87	0	0	0	0	0	0	0	0	
0	1987/88	0	0	0	0	0	0	0	0	
0	1988/89	0	0	0	0	0	0	0	0	
0	1989/90	0	0	0	0	0	0	0	0	
0	1990/91	0	0	0	0	0	0	0	0	
0	1991/92	0	0	0	0	0	0	0	0	
17	1992/93	38	10	7	21	39	56	−17	27	Second Promotion (Victory 3 points)
0	1993/94	0	0	0	0	0	0	0	0	Second Relegation
0	1994/95	0	0	0	0	0	0	0	0	
0	1995/96	0	0	0	0	0	0	0	0	
17	Invierno 1996	17	3	6	8	25	36	−11	15	Short Tournaments and Third Promotion
14	Verano 1997	17	5	2	10	24	32	−8	17	
0	Invierno 1997	0	0	0	0	0	0	0	0	Third Relegation
0	Verano 1998	0	0	0	0	0	0	0	0	
16	Invierno 1998	17	5	1	11	28	39	−11	16	Fourth Promotion
9	Verano 1999	17	6	6	5	23	22	1	24	
7, Champion	Invierno 1999	17	8	2	7	28	28	0	26	First Championship Pachuca vs Cruz Azul (2–2 0–1 AGREG=2–3)
16	Verano 2000	17	4	5	8	18	25	−7	17	
4	Invierno 2000	17	8	4	5	24	18	16	28	Quarter Finals Pachuca vs Monarcas Morelia (0–0 1–2 AGREG=2–1)
6, Runner-up	Verano 2001	17	7	4	6	22	22	0	25	Final Pachuca vs Santos Laguna (2–1 3–1 AGREG=4–3)
3, Champion	Invierno 2001	18	9	5	4	29	24	5	32	Second Championship Pachuca vs Tigres UANL (2–0 1–1 AGREG=1–3)
13	Verano 2002	18	6	4	8	26	33	−7	22	
20	Apertura 2002	19	2	9	8	21	35	−14	15	
15	Clausura 2003	19	4	9	6	21	23	−2	21	
3, Champion	Apertura 2003	19	10	6	3	28	19	9	36	Third Championship Pachuca vs Tigres UANL (3–1 1–0 AGREG=2–3)
8	Clausura 2004	19	6	8	5	32	33	−1	26	Reclassification Pachuca vs Cruz Azul (1–2 0–2 AGREG=4–1)
3	Apertura 2004	17	9	5	3	30	19	11	32	Cuartos de final Pachuca vs Monterrey (1–2 1–1 AGREG=3–2)
14	Clausura 2005	17	5	5	7	20	27	−7	20	
6	Apertura 2005	17	7	7	3	26	18	8	28	Semifinal Pachuca vs Toluca (0–0 2–1 AGREG=2–1)
1, Champion	Clausura 2006	17	9	4	4	33	19	14	31	Fourth Championship Pachuca vs San Luis (0–0 1–0 AGREG=1–0)
6	Apertura 2006	17	7	5	5	32	24	8	26	Semifinal Pachuca vs Toluca (1–1 1–0 AGREG=2–1)
1, Champion	Clausura 2007	17	12	3	2	36	12	24	39	Fifth championship Pachuca vs América (1–2 1–1 AGREG=3–2)
9	Apertura 2007	17	7	3	7	26	23	3	24	Reclassification Pachuca vs Cruz Azul (0–2 4–0 AGREG=6–0)
10	Clausura 2008	17	6	4	7	27	25	2	22	Reclassification Pachuca vs Cruz Azul (0–2 4–0 AGREG=6–0)
12	Apertura 2008	17	5	6	6	25	25	0	21	
1, Runner-up	Clausura 2009	17	11	3	3	42	23	19	36	Final Pachuca vs Pumas UNAM (1–0 2–2 AGREG=3–2)
8	Apertura 2009	17	7	3	7	24	29	−5	24	
8	Bicentenario 2010	17	7	4	6	27	26	1	25	Semifinal Pachuca vs Toluca (2–2 1–0 AGREG=3–2)
7	Apertura 2010	17	7	4	6	27	28	−1	25	Quarter Finals Pachuca vs Monterrey (1–1 3–3 AGREG=4–4 (Monterrey best table place)
13	Clausura 2011	17	4	6	7	16	25	−9	18	
6	Apertura 2011	17	7	5	5	28	25	3	26	Quarter Finals Pachuca vs Tigres UANL (0–1 3–0 AGREG=4–0)
0	Clausura 2012	0	0	0	0	0	0	0	0	lost

== Player records ==
=== Players with the most titles ===
Rank	Player	Titles	League	International
1	(Colombia) (Mexico) Miguel Calero	10	Inv–2001, Ape–2003, Cla–2006, Cla–2007	2002 CCC, 2006 CS, 2007 CCC, 2007 NAS, 2008 CCC, 2009–10 CCL
2	(Argentina) (Mexico) Gabriel Caballero	9	Inv–1999, Inv–2001, Ape–2003, Cla–2006, Cla–2007	2006 CS, 2007 CCC, 2007 NAS, 2008 CCC
2	(Colombia) (Mexico) Andrés Chitiva	9	Inv–2001, Ape–2003, Cla–2006, Cla–2007	2002 CCC, 2006 CS, 2007 CCC, 2007 NAS, 2008 CCC
2	(Mexico) Jaime Correa	9	Inv–2001, Ape–2003, Cla–2006, Cla–2007	2006 CS, 2007 CCC, 2007 NAS, 2008 CCC, 2009–10 CCL
5	(Mexico) Fausto Pinto	8	Inv–2001, Cla–2006, Cla–2007	2002 CCC, 2006 CS, 2007 CCC, 2007 NAS, 2008 CCC
6	(Mexico) Juan Carlos Cacho	7	Cla–2006, Cla–2007	2006 CS, 2007 CCC, 2007 NAS, 2008 CCC, 2009–10 CCL
6	(Mexico) Carlos Rodríguez	7	Cla–2006, Cla–2007	2006 CS, 2007 CCC, 2007 NAS, 2008 CCC, 2009–10 CCL
8	(Argentina) (Mexico) Damián Álvarez	6	Cla–2007	2006 CS, 2007 CCC, 2007 NAS, 2008 CCC, 2009–10 CCL
8	(Colombia) (Mexico) Aquivaldo Mosquera	6	Cla–2006, Cla–2007, Cla–2016	2006 CS, 2007 CCC, 2007 NAS
10	(Argentina) (Mexico) Christian Giménez	5	Cla–2007	2006 CS, 2007 CCC, 2007 NAS, 2008 CCC
10	(Mexico) Leobardo López	5	Cla–2007	2006 CS, 2007 CCC, 2007 NAS, 2008 CCC

Notes

- Inv – Invierno
- Ape – Apertura
- Cla – Clausura
- CCC / CCL – CONCACAF Champions Cup / CONCACAF Champions League
- CS – Copa Sudamericana
- NAS – North American SuperLiga

=== Players with the most appearances ===
Rank	Player	Matches	Period
1	(Colombia) (Mexico) Miguel Calero	435	2000–2011
2	(Mexico) Alberto Rodríguez	384	1994–1997, 1998–2005
3	(Argentina) (Mexico) Gabriel Caballero	351	1998–2002, 2003–04, 2005–2009
4	(Mexico) Jaime Correa	331	2001–2010, 2013
5	(Mexico) Jorge Hernández	320	2012–2021
6	(Mexico) Víctor Guzmán	272	2015–2019, 2020–2022, 2025–26
7	(Colombia) (Mexico) Andrés Chitiva	271	2001–2008, 2011
8	(Colombia) Óscar Murillo	243	2016–2023
9	(Mexico) Leobardo López	221	2007–2012
10	(Mexico) Carlos Rodríguez	205	2004–2012
11	(Mexico) Manuel Vidrio	193	1999–2002, 2003–2005
12	(Mexico) Francisco Gabriel de Anda	189	2000–2005
12	(Mexico) Óscar Pérez	189	2013–2019
14	(Argentina) (Mexico) Christian Giménez	187	2006–2009, 2018
15	(Mexico) Érick Sánchez	186	2016–2018, 2020–2024
16	(Mexico) Fausto Pinto	185	2001–2008
17	(Mexico) Sergio Santana	182	2000–2005
18	(Mexico) Érick Gutiérrez	178	2013–2018
19	(Argentina) (Mexico) Damián Álvarez	177	2006–2010
20	(Argentina) Franco Jara	169	2015–2020
21	(Mexico) Juan Carlos Cacho	166	2004–05, 2006–2008

=== Players with the most goals scored ===
Updated as of 21 November 2026.

Rank	Player	Goals	Period
1	(Argentina) Franco Jara	83	2015–2020
2	(Argentina) (Mexico) Gabriel Caballero	69	1998–2002, 2003–04, 2005–2009
3	(Argentina) (Mexico) Christian Giménez	66	2006–2009, 2018
4	(Mexico) Juan Carlos Cacho	63	2004–05, 2006–2008
4	(Mexico) Víctor Guzmán	63	2015–2019, 2020–2022, 2025–26
6	(Argentina) Lorenzo Sáez	59	1995–1997
7	(Venezuela) Salomón Rondón	58	2024–25, 2026
8	(Mexico) Sergio Santana	50	2000–2005
9	(Colombia) (Mexico) Andrés Chitiva	45	2001–2008, 2011
10	(Brazil) Francisco Moacyr	43	1967–1971
10	(Mexico) Hirving Lozano	43	2014–2017
12	(Mexico) Jesús Zárate	39	1967–1970
12	(Costa Rica) Hernán Medford	39	1994–1997
14	(Argentina) Nicolás Ibáñez	35	2021–2023
15	(Argentina) (Mexico) Damián Álvarez	33	2006–2010
16	(Paraguay) Edgar Benítez	30	2009–2011
17	(Argentina) Ariel Nahuelpán	29	2014–2016
18	(Mexico) Juan Manuel Medina	27	1969–1972
19	(Argentina) Alejandro Glaría	26	1998–2000
19	(Ecuador) Enner Valencia	26	2014, 2025–26
21	(Mexico) Jorge "Tepo" Rodríguez	25	1968–1972
22	(Mexico) Francisco Gabriel de Anda	25	2000–2005
22	(Mexico) Ulises Mendívil	25	2009–2011
22	(Mexico) Érick Gutiérrez	25	2014–2018
25	(Argentina) Pablo Hernán Gómez	22	1999–2001
25	(Venezuela) Juan Arango	22	2002–03
25	(Mexico) Roberto de la Rosa	22	2017
25	(Morocco) Oussama Idrissi	22	2023–present

Notes

- Italic – Players currently on the club's squad.

=== Players with the most goals scored in domestic league ===
Updated as of 21 November 2026

Rank	Player	Goals
1	(Argentina) Franco Jara	66
2	(Argentina) (Mexico) Gabriel Caballero	58
3	(Argentina) Lorenzo Sáez	55
4	(Mexico) Víctor Guzmán	54
5	(Mexico) Juan Carlos Cacho	53
6	(Venezuela) Salomón Rondón	47
7	(Argentina) (Mexico) Christian Giménez	45
8	(Mexico) Sergio Santana	44
9	(Mexico) Jesús Zárate	38
9	(Brazil) Francisco Moacyr	38
11	(Colombia) (Mexico) Andrés Chitiva	37
12	(Costa Rica) Hernán Medford	36
13	(Argentina) Nicolás Ibáñez	35
14	(Mexico) Hirving Lozano	31
15	(Mexico) Juan Manuel Medina	27
16	(Argentina) Alejandro Glaría	26
16	(Ecuador) Enner Valencia	26
18	(Mexico) Jorge "Tepo" Rodríguez	23
18	(Argentina) Ariel Nahuelpán	23
20	(Mexico) Francisco Gabriel de Anda	22
20	(Argentina) (Mexico) Damián Álvarez	22

Notes

- Italic – Players currently on the club's squad.

=== Goalscoring champions ===
Season	Player	Goals
Verano 1997	(Argentina) Lorenzo Sáez	12^{s}
Clausura 2014	(Ecuador) Enner Valencia	12
Apertura 2022	(Argentina) Nicolás Ibáñez	11
Clausura 2024	(Venezuela) Salomón Rondón	8
Apertura 2026	(Venezuela) Salomón Rondón	17

Notes

- ^{s} Shared title.

== Club records in domestic league ==
=== Liga MX regular phase ===
- Seasons/Tournaments: 67
- Debut: 1967–68 (12th of 16)
- First match:
  - 1–3 Necaxa (6 July 1967)
- First win:
  - 2–1 Monterrey (16 July 1967)
- Biggest win:
  - 9–2 Veracruz (Clausura 2019)
- Biggest defeat:
  - 0–5 Tigres UANL (Apertura 2011)
  - 0–5 Cruz Azul (Clausura 2018)
  - 0–5 Monterrey (Clausura 2019)
- First place: 4 (Clausura 2006, Clausura 2007, Clausura 2009, Clausura 2022)
- Last place: 2 (1972–73, Apertura 2002)
- Most points: 39 (Clausura 2007)
- Fewer points: 13 (Apertura 2024)
- Most wins: 12 (Clausura 2007, Clausura 2022)
- Fewer wins: 2 (Apertura 2002)
- Most goals scored: 53 goals in 23 matches (Clausura 2009)
- Fewer goals conceded: 17 goals in 22 matches (Clausura 2007)

=== Liga MX final phase ===
- Appearances: 33
  - Finals: 11 (7 titles and 4 runners-up)
  - Semifinals: 6
  - Quarter-finals: 11
  - Repechage/Play-in: 5
- Debut: Invierno 1999 (Champions)
- First match:
  - 2–4 Morelia (25 November 1999)
- First win:
  - 2–0 Morelia (28 November 1999)
- Biggest win:
  - 5–1 Toluca (Apertura 2022)
- Biggest defeat:
  - 0–4 Cruz Azul (Apertura 2007)

== Club records in international competitions ==
- Appearances: 31
- Debut: 2000 Copa Merconorte (Group stage)
- Debut in CONCACAF competitions: 2000 CONCACAF Champions' Cup (3rd place)
- First match:
  - 0–1 Emelec (Ecuador) (13 July 2000)
- First match in CONCACAF competitions:
  - 1–0 Joe Public (Trinidad and Tobago) (16 January 2001)
- First win:
  - 2–1 Oriente Petrolero (Bolivia) (8 August 2000)
- Biggest win:
  - 11–0 Police United (Belize) (2016–17 CONCACAF Champions League Group stage)
- Biggest defeat:
  - 0–4 Olimpia (Honduras) (2000 CONCACAF Champions' Cup Semi-finals)
  - 0–4 Boca Juniors (Argentina) (2005 Copa Libertadores Group stage)
  - 0–4 Internacional (Brazil) (2007 Recopa Sudamericana 2nd leg)

== Club statistics in all competitions ==
Updated at the conclusion of the regular phase of the Liga MX Apertura 2026

League
Round	Part	Pld	W	D	L	GF	GA	GD
Regular phase	67	1265	476	330	459	1812	1771	+41
Final phase	33	127	54	38	35	188	151	+37
Total		1392	530	368	494	2000	1922	+78

Overall statistics
Type	Competition	Part	Pld	W	D	L	GF	GA	GD	Best Part
Domestic competitions	Liga MX	67	1392	530	368	494	2000	1922	+78	Champions (7)
Domestic competitions	Copa MX	20	110	46	30	34	172	139	+33	Runners-up
Domestic competitions	Campeón de Campeones	4	6	1	0	5	4	12	–8	Runners-up (4)
Total			1518	577	398	533	2176	2073	+103	7 titles
International competitions	FIFA Club World Cup	5	12	3	1	8	13	18	–5	Third place
International competitions	FIFA Intercontinental Cup	1	1	0	0	1	0	3	–3	Runners-up
International competitions	FIFA Challenger Cup	1	1	0	1	0	0	0	0	Champions
International competitions	FIFA Derby of the Americas	1	1	1	0	0	3	0	+3	Champions
International competitions	CONCACAF Champions Cup	10	62	36	15	11	131	54	+77	Champions (6)
International competitions	CONMEBOL Libertadores	2	10	4	2	4	13	16	–3	Round of 16
International competitions	CONMEBOL Sudamericana	2	10	6	2	2	22	12	+10	Champions
International competitions	CONMEBOL Recopa	1	2	1	0	1	2	5	–3	Runners-up
International competitions	Copa Merconorte	1	6	3	0	3	6	7	−1	Group stage
International competitions	Leagues Cup	4	11	3	3	5	12	15	–3	Quarter-finals
International competitions	North American SuperLiga	3	12	3	3	6	11	17	–6	Champions
Total			128	60	27	41	213	147	+66	10 titles

Notes

- Italic – discontinued competition.
