= 1945–46 Mexican Primera División season =

3rd professional season of the top division of Mexican football

Liga Mayor
- Season: 1945–46
- Champions: Veracruz (1st title)
- Matches: 240
- Goals: 1,182 (4.93 per match)

The 1945–46 season was the 3rd edition of the Mexican professional league known as Liga Mayor. It had 16 participating clubs from Mexico City, Jalisco, Veracruz, Puebla, Guanajuato, Nuevo León and Tamaulipas.

== Clubs ==
Location of the 1945-46 Primera División teams

Team	City	Stadium
ADO	Orizaba, Veracruz	Campo Moctezuma
América	Mexico City	Parque Asturias
Atlante	Mexico City	Parque Asturias
Atlas	Jalisco	Parque Oblatos
Asturias	Mexico City	Parque Asturias
Guadalajara	Guadalajara, Jalisco	Parque Oblatos
León	León, Guanajuato	Patria / Enrique Fernández Martínez
Marte	Mexico City	Parque Asturias
Moctezuma	Orizaba, Veracruz	Campo Moctezuma
Monterrey	Monterrey, Nuevo León	Parque Cuauhtémoc
Oro	Guadalajara, Jalisco	Parque Oblatos
Puebla	Puebla, Puebla	Parque El Mirador
RC España	Mexico City	Campo España
San Sebastián	León, Guanajuato	Patria / Enrique Fernández Martínez
Tampico	Tampico, Tamaulipas	Tampico
Veracruz	Veracruz, Veracruz	Parque Deportivo Veracruzano

== League standings ==
Pos	Team	Pld	W	D	L	GF	GA	GD	Pts	Qualification
1	Veracruz	30	20	5	5	105	52	+53	45	Champions
2	Atlante	30	20	2	8	121	80	+41	42	Runners-up
3	Puebla	30	17	4	9	85	48	+37	38	Third place
4	León	30	17	4	9	58	40	+18	38	
5	Oro	30	17	4	9	83	61	+22	38	
6	Moctezuma	30	15	3	12	85	69	+16	33	
7	RC España	30	15	2	13	91	68	+23	32	
8	ADO	30	14	4	12	49	52	−3	32	
9	Atlas	30	13	5	12	71	69	+2	31	
10	Asturias	30	12	4	14	71	74	−3	28	
11	Guadalajara	30	11	5	14	60	64	−4	27	
12	Marte	30	9	7	14	67	87	−20	25	
13	Tampico	30	9	3	18	61	97	−36	21	
14	América	30	7	5	18	71	101	−30	19	
15	San Sebastian	30	5	5	20	46	87	−41	15	
16	Monterrey	30	5	4	21	58	133	−75	14	Folded

Source: rsssf.com

== Results ==
Home \ Away	ADO	AME	AST	ATT	ATL	ESP	GDL	LEO	MAR	MOC	MTY	ORO	PUE	SST	TAM	VER
ADO		5–1	0–2	1–4	2–0	3–1	1–0	0–1	3–2	1–3	5–2	1–3	1–1	0–1	1–0	0–1
América	1–1		0–4	5–5	3–3	2–2	4–6	2–5	2–3	2–5	1–2	1–2	1–4	3–1	6–2	5–7
Asturias	1–2	2–3		2–3	5–1	1–7	2–2	1–0	2–3	3–1	6–5	2–3	2–1	1–0	1–2	1–3
Atlante	3–3	4–2	4–1		5–3	3–2	5–0	1–3	3–1	6–2	10–4	5–3	3–0	9–2	4–3	2–5
Atlas	1–2	6–3	5–5	4–2		1–0	2–0	2–1	3–1	3–1	6–4	2–0	1–4	3–1	5–1	2–2
RC España	1–2	3–4	5–4	4–1	4–3		4–2	1–2	3–2	4–6	10–1	1–1	3–1	5–2	2–3	2–3
Guadalajara	2–3	4–2	2–1	3–5	1–1	1–2		1–0	2–1	1–0	9–2	1–2	1–3	3–0	3–1	1–2
León	2–1	5–0	0–2	3–2	4–0	0–1	1–1		4–1	2–0	2–1	5–3	1–0	2–1	1–2	1–1
Marte	1–2	5–3	1–1	1–6	1–1	2–9	3–3	0–3		5–0	7–1	3–2	1–1	4–3	4–1	2–4
Moctezuma	4–1	0–1	1–4	6–3	2–4	4–2	3–2	5–1	4–1		6–0	7–0	2–1	6–1	4–1	3–2
Monterrey	3–2	2–5	4–5	2–4	2–5	1–2	1–1	0–1	5–3	2–2		2–2	1–1	1–0	0–2	2–4
Oro	7–1	3–2	3–1	1–3	3–2	3–1	0–2	4–2	1–2	3–3	5–3		1–0	8–2	5–3	0–0
Puebla	0–1	2–0	3–3	6–0	2–0	5–4	4–3	4–0	8–0	5–1	7–0	0–6		4–2	5–1	3–1
San Sebastián	0–0	1–1	3–4	2–4	1–0	0–1	2–0	1–1	2–2	3–1	2–3	1–3	2–4		2–2	5–3
Tampico	4–2	5–3	2–0	3–10	3–2	1–2	1–2	1–4	1–1	3–3	4–2	1–5	3–5	2–3		0–6
Veracruz	0–2	2–3	5–2	3–2	4–0	4–3	6–1	1–1	4–4	3–2	14–0	3–1	7–0	5–3	4–3	

Source: rsssf.com
Legend: Blue = home team win; Yellow = draw; Red = away team win.

Champions

1st title

=== Moves ===
After this season Monterrey folded.
