= 1946–47 Mexican Primera División season =

4th professional season of the top division of Mexican football

Liga Mayor
- Season: 1946–47
- Champions: Atlante (1st title)
- Matches: 210
- Goals: 905 (4.31 per match)

The 1946–47 season was the 4th edition of the Mexican professional league known as Liga Mayor. It had 15 participating clubs.

== Clubs ==
Location of the 1946-47 Primera División teams

| Team | City | Stadium |
|---|---|---|
| ADO | Orizaba, Veracruz | Campo Moctezuma |
| América | Mexico City | Parque Asturias |
| Atlante | Mexico City | Parque Asturias |
| Atlas | Jalisco | Parque Oblatos |
| Asturias | Mexico City | Parque Asturias |
| Guadalajara | Guadalajara, Jalisco | Parque Oblatos |
| León | León, Guanajuato | Enrique Fernández Martínez |
| Marte | Mexico City | Parque Asturias |
| Moctezuma | Orizaba, Veracruz | Campo Moctezuma |
| Oro | Guadalajara, Jalisco | Parque Oblatos |
| Puebla | Puebla, Puebla | Parque El Mirador |
| RC España | Mexico City | Campo España |
| San Sebastián | León, Guanajuato | Enrique Fernández Martínez |
| Tampico | Tampico, Tamaulipas | Tampico |
| Veracruz | Veracruz, Veracruz | Parque Deportivo Veracruzano |

== League standings ==
| Pos | Team | Pld | W | D | L | GF | GA | GD | Pts | Qualification |
|---|---|---|---|---|---|---|---|---|---|---|
| 1 | Atlante | 28 | 18 | 6 | 4 | 82 | 43 | +39 | 42 | Champions |
| 2 | León | 28 | 18 | 5 | 5 | 85 | 42 | +43 | 41 | Runners-up |
| 3 | Veracruz | 28 | 15 | 8 | 5 | 85 | 46 | +39 | 38 | Third place |
| 4 | Puebla | 28 | 13 | 9 | 6 | 55 | 45 | +10 | 35 | |
| 5 | Atlas | 28 | 14 | 6 | 8 | 59 | 45 | +14 | 34 | |
| 6 | Tampico | 28 | 12 | 8 | 8 | 51 | 42 | +9 | 32 | |
| 7 | Moctezuma | 28 | 10 | 7 | 11 | 58 | 68 | −10 | 27 | |
| 8 | Oro | 28 | 10 | 6 | 12 | 51 | 62 | −11 | 26 | |
| 9 | RC España | 28 | 11 | 3 | 14 | 53 | 57 | −4 | 25 | |
| 10 | Asturias | 28 | 10 | 5 | 13 | 53 | 65 | −12 | 25 | |
| 11 | Guadalajara | 28 | 7 | 9 | 12 | 58 | 61 | −3 | 23 | |
| 12 | ADO | 28 | 7 | 5 | 16 | 51 | 62 | −11 | 19 | |
| 13 | San Sebastian | 28 | 7 | 5 | 16 | 55 | 88 | −33 | 19 | |
| 14 | América | 28 | 7 | 3 | 18 | 53 | 80 | −27 | 17 | |
| 15 | Marte | 28 | 5 | 7 | 16 | 56 | 99 | −43 | 17 | |

Source: rsssf.com

== Results ==
| Home \ Away | ADO | AME | AST | ATT | ATL | ESP | GDL | LEO | MAR | MOC | ORO | PUE | SST | TAM | VER |
|---|---|---|---|---|---|---|---|---|---|---|---|---|---|---|---|
| ADO | | 1–2 | 4–2 | 0–2 | 1–2 | 2–5 | 5–3 | 3–1 | 0–1 | 0–1 | 0–1 | 2–2 | 3–1 | 3–1 | 1–3 |
| América | 1–3 | | 2–2 | 1–5 | 1–3 | 3–2 | 2–3 | 2–1 | 3–4 | 1–2 | 3–0 | 1–2 | 3–0 | 2–2 | 1–3 |
| Asturias | 3–1 | 2–2 | | 2–3 | 0–1 | 1–2 | 3–1 | 2–5 | 1–1 | 4–3 | 5–3 | 1–0 | 3–1 | 0–2 | 4–3 |
| Atlante | 5–2 | 4–3 | 3–0 | | 2–3 | 1–0 | 2–2 | 3–2 | 6–2 | 6–4 | 3–1 | 1–3 | 6–3 | 5–0 | 5–1 |
| Atlas | 3–5 | 9–2 | 2–1 | 1–1 | | 2–2 | 1–1 | 0–0 | 2–1 | 2–4 | 3–2 | 1–2 | 1–2 | 2–1 | 2–2 |
| RC España | 2–0 | 0–2 | 0–1 | 2–2 | 1–3 | | 1–2 | 3–1 | 4–1 | 2–1 | 2–0 | 2–4 | 2–1 | 0–4 | 2–6 |
| Guadalajara | 2–1 | 3–0 | 3–4 | 1–1 | 1–2 | 2–1 | | 1–2 | 3–1 | 1–4 | 1–1 | 1–2 | 8–1 | 3–4 | 2–2 |
| León | 2–1 | 6–2 | 2–1 | 0–0 | 3–0 | 3–2 | 4–1 | | 9–1 | 3–2 | 1–2 | 3–0 | 2–2 | 3–0 | 3–1 |
| Marte | 5–4 | 6–4 | 1–5 | 2–5 | 0–5 | 0–3 | 4–4 | 2–5 | | 2–4 | 5–5 | 1–3 | 2–2 | 2–1 | 1–2 |
| Moctezuma | 2–2 | 4–2 | 2–0 | 1–1 | 0–0 | 2–1 | 3–3 | 2–7 | 3–1 | | 1–1 | 1–2 | 6–4 | 0–2 | 1–6 |
| Oro | 3–1 | 4–3 | 2–2 | 0–2 | 1–3 | 4–2 | 0–0 | 2–4 | 4–2 | 2–1 | | 1–0 | 2–0 | 3–0 | 1–2 |
| Puebla | 2–1 | 4–1 | 5–1 | 3–5 | 0–3 | 2–2 | 3–2 | 1–1 | 1–1 | 2–2 | 1–1 | | 1–3 | 1–1 | 2–1 |
| San Sebastián | 3–3 | 1–3 | 2–2 | 1–0 | 3–2 | 1–3 | 4–2 | 2–7 | 4–4 | 4–1 | 4–3 | 1–3 | | 2–3 | 1–3 |
| Tampico | 1–1 | 2–0 | 5–1 | 1–0 | 2–0 | 1–2 | 2–1 | 2–3 | 2–2 | 1–1 | 4–0 | 2–2 | 3–1 | | 1–1 |
| Veracruz | 1–1 | 2–1 | 4–0 | 2–3 | 4–1 | 5–3 | 1–1 | 2–2 | 5–1 | 6–0 | 7–2 | 2–2 | 7–1 | 1–1 | |

Source: rsssf.com
Legend: Blue = home team win; Yellow = draw; Red = away team win.

Champions

1st title
