= 1947–48 Mexican Primera División season =

5th professional season of the top division of Mexican football

Liga Mayor
- Season: 1947–48
- Champions: León (1st title)
- Matches: 212
- Goals: 881 (4.16 per match)

The 1947–48 season was the 5th edition of the Mexican professional league known as Liga Mayor. It had 15 participating clubs.

== Clubs ==
Location of the 1947-48 Primera División teams

Team	City	Stadium
ADO	Orizaba, Veracruz	Campo Moctezuma
América	Mexico City	Ciudad de los Deportes
Atlante	Mexico City	Ciudad de los Deportes
Atlas	Jalisco	Parque Oblatos
Asturias	Mexico City	Parque Asturias
Guadalajara	Guadalajara, Jalisco	Parque Oblatos
León	León, Guanajuato	Enrique Fernández Martínez
Marte	Mexico City	Ciudad de los Deportes
Moctezuma	Orizaba, Veracruz	Campo Moctezuma
Oro	Guadalajara, Jalisco	Parque Oblatos
Puebla	Puebla, Puebla	Parque El Mirador
RC España	Mexico City	Campo España
San Sebastián	León, Guanajuato	Enrique Fernández Martínez
Tampico	Tampico, Tamaulipas	Tampico
Veracruz	Veracruz, Veracruz	Parque Deportivo Veracruzano

== League standings ==
Pos	Team	Pld	W	D	L	GF	GA	GD	Pts	Qualification
1	León	28	15	6	7	87	39	+48	36	Champions
2	Oro	28	16	4	8	80	49	+31	36	Runners-up
3	Atlas	28	14	7	7	69	50	+19	35	Third place
4	Puebla	28	15	5	8	40	34	+6	35	
5	ADO	28	13	5	10	68	66	+2	31	
6	San Sebastian	28	12	4	12	50	76	−26	28	
7	RC España	28	10	7	11	56	53	+3	27	
8	Tampico	28	11	5	12	62	64	−2	27	
9	Veracruz	28	12	3	13	62	66	−4	27	
10	América	28	11	4	13	63	71	−8	26	
11	Guadalajara	28	9	7	12	55	69	−14	25	
12	Moctezuma	28	9	6	13	63	77	−14	24	
13	Marte	28	9	5	14	66	78	−12	23	
14	Atlante	28	8	5	15	58	66	−8	21	
15	Asturias	28	6	7	15	41	62	−21	19	

Source: rsssf.com

== Results ==
Home \ Away	ADO	AME	AST	ATT	ATL	ESP	GDL	LEO	MAR	MOC	ORO	PUE	SST	TAM	VER
ADO		3–1	2–2	3–1	3–2	3–2	2–1	2–3	4–1	4–2	1–1	2–1	2–2	4–2	4–0
América	4–4		2–1	2–1	1–0	1–1	4–3	2–6	3–7	4–3	0–1	0–2	5–0	3–4	2–1
Asturias	1–3	2–2		2–1	6–5	4–2	3–1	3–2	1–2	1–2	2–2	0–1	1–1	2–4	0–2
Atlante	4–3	2–1	1–2		4–2	0–1	1–3	1–10	2–3	0–3	3–1	2–4	6–1	3–3	6–2
Atlas	5–2	1–1	3–3	2–1		0–2	2–1	5–1	3–1	1–1	0–0	4–2	3–2	2–1	3–1
RC España	4–2	1–0	3–2	1–0	2–3		0–1	0–0	3–1	2–2	2–0	0–1	2–3	6–1	5–5
Guadalajara	4–1	4–3	1–1	1–1	2–2	1–1		1–4	3–5	3–2	4–4	2–1	2–0	0–3	3–1
Leon	6–2	6–0	4–0	1–1	3–3	3–2	5–0		9–0	1–1	0–4	0–0	6–0	4–2	5–0
Marte	2–3	5–6	1–1	3–5	3–4	2–2	1–3	0–2		6–3	3–2	1–2	1–0	2–2	4–1
Moctezuma	0–1	1–3	1–1	1–6	1–4	4–3	4–2	2–2	4–4		3–2	1–0	6–2	5–3	2–4
Oro	4–2	2–1	5–0	4–0	1–6	6–4	4–1	2–0	0–2	7–1		3–0	8–0	4–2	3–4
Puebla	1–0	2–1	3–2	1–0	0–0	3–3	3–3	2–0	1–0	1–0	2–1		1–2	1–2	2–1
San Sebastián	3–3	3–1	2–1	3–2	2–1	2–1	3–2	0–3	3–2	4–2	2–3	2–0		4–2	0–0
Tampico	2–1	0–4	0–1	1–1	2–0	3–0	5–0	2–0	2–2	4–3	2–3	1–1	7–2		0–2
Veracruz	5–2	4–3	4–0	3–2	1–3	2–1	2–2	2–1	4–2	2–3	2–3	1–2	2–3	4–0	

Source: rsssf.com
Legend: Blue = home team win; Yellow = draw; Red = away team win.

== Championship playoff ==
León	0-0	Oro

Ciudad de los Deportes Stadium, Mexico City

León	2–0	Oro
	Replay match

Ciudad de los Deportes Stadium, Mexico City

Champions

1st title
