= 1944–45 Mexican Primera División season =

2nd professional season of the top division of Mexican football

Liga Mayor
- Season: 1944–45
- Champions: RC España (1st title)
- Matches: 156
- Goals: 713 (4.57 per match)

The 1944–45 season was the 2nd edition of the Mexican professional league known as Liga Mayor. It had 13 participating clubs from Mexico City, Jalisco, Veracruz, Puebla and Guanajuato.

== Clubs ==
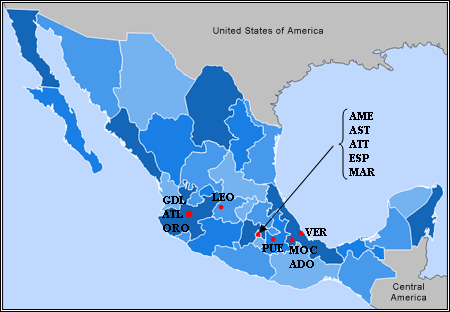

Team	City	Stadium
ADO	Orizaba, Veracruz	Campo Moctezuma
América	Mexico City	Parque Asturias
Atlante	Mexico City	Parque Asturias
Atlas	Jalisco	Parque Oblatos
Asturias	Mexico City	Parque Asturias
Guadalajara	Guadalajara, Jalisco	Parque Oblatos
Marte	Mexico City	Parque Asturias
Moctezuma	Orizaba, Veracruz	Campo Moctezuma
Oro	Guadalajara, Jalisco	Parque Oblatos
Puebla	Puebla, Puebla	Parque El Mirador
RC España	Mexico City	Campo España
Unión-León	León, Guanajuato	Patria
Veracruz	Veracruz, Veracruz	Parque Deportivo Veracruzano

== League standings ==
Pos	Team	Pld	W	D	L	GF	GA	GD	Pts	Qualification
1	RC España	24	18	2	4	79	41	+38	38	Champions
2	Puebla	24	14	2	8	53	30	+23	30	Runners-up
3	Moctezuma	24	12	4	8	55	46	+9	28	Third place
4	Unión-León	24	10	7	7	56	47	+9	27	
5	Asturias	24	12	2	10	72	66	+6	26	
6	Atlas	24	11	2	11	51	54	−3	24	
7	Atlante	24	9	4	11	67	61	+6	22	
8	Veracruz	24	7	8	9	48	49	−1	22	
9	América	24	9	4	11	47	64	−17	22	
10	Guadalajara	24	6	9	9	50	60	−10	21	
11	Marte	24	9	3	12	51	67	−16	21	
12	ADO	24	8	3	13	46	57	−11	19	
13	Oro	24	4	4	16	38	71	−33	12	

Source: rsssf.com

== Results ==
Home \ Away	ADO	AME	AST	ATT	ATL	ESP	GDL	LEO	MAR	MOC	ORO	PUE	VER
ADO		1–3	3–5	2–5	4–0	2–0	4–4	2–3	0–2	1–4	0–0	3–2	2–2
América	3–2		0–7	3–3	2–4	3–1	0–0	1–3	4–1	5–3	2–4	0–2	4–1
Asturias	6–3	2–3		2–0	5–4	4–2	1–1	3–2	1–1	1–3	4–3	1–2	5–2
Atlante	2–4	2–4	1–4		6–2	4–5	6–1	2–2	3–1	4–2	8–0	1–1	6–2
Atlas	2–0	3–0	3–1	2–1		1–4	4–3	1–1	2–0	1–2	4–1	1–2	3–1
RC España	2–3	2–0	7–2	3–1	3–1		5–2	4–2	5–1	6–1	6–3	2–1	5–2
Guadalajara	2–1	2–2	3–1	8–2	3–1	1–1		1–2	1–1	1–6	3–1	1–2	2–2
Unión-León	1–3	4–0	5–3	5–3	2–3	2–2	1–1		3–3	3–0	4–0	1–5	3–1
Marte	3–0	3–2	7–3	3–2	3–2	1–5	3–5	3–2		1–3	3–6	4–3	1–4
Moctezuma	1–2	1–1	3–2	0–2	3–1	1–2	4–1	2–2	3–1		5–1	4–1	1–6
Oro	2–1	2–3	1–4	3–0	1–3	1–3	2–2	1–2	2–5	1–1		2–3	1–2
Puebla	2–1	4–0	5–1	1–2	5–2	0–1	3–0	2–0	4–0	0–2	3–0		0–1
Veracruz	1–2	7–2	2–4	1–1	1–1	2–3	5–2	1–1	2–0	0–0	0–0	0–0	

Source: rsssf.com
Legend: Blue = home team win; Yellow = draw; Red = away team win.

=== Moves ===
After this season Monterrey, Tampico and San Sebastián joined the league.
