= 1949–50 Mexican Primera División season =

7th professional season of the top division of Mexican football

Primera División de México
- Season: 1949–50
- Champions: Veracruz (2nd title)
- Matches: 182
- Goals: 734 (4.03 per match)

The 1949–50 season was the 7th edition of the Mexican professional league renamed as Primera División de México. It had 14 participating clubs.

== Clubs ==
Location of the 1945-46 Primera División teams

Team	City	Stadium
América	Mexico City	Ciudad de los Deportes
Atlante	Mexico City	Ciudad de los Deportes
Atlas	Guadalajara, Jalisco	Parque Oblatos
Asturias	Mexico City	Parque Asturias
Guadalajara	Guadalajara, Jalisco	Parque Oblatos
León	León, Guanajuato	Enrique Fernández Martínez
Marte	Mexico City	Ciudad de los Deportes
Moctezuma	Orizaba, Veracruz	Campo Moctezuma
Oro	Guadalajara, Jalisco	Parque Oblatos
Puebla	Puebla, Puebla	Parque El Mirador
RC España	Mexico City	Campo España
San Sebastián	León, Guanajuato	Enrique Fernández Martínez
Tampico	Tampico, Tamaulipas	Tampico
Veracruz	Veracruz, Veracruz	Parque Deportivo Veracruzano

== League standings ==
Pos	Team	Pld	W	D	L	GF	GA	GD	Pts	Qualification
1	Veracruz	26	16	7	3	78	43	+35	39	Champions
2	Atlante	26	13	7	6	59	43	+16	33	Runners-up
3	León	26	13	5	8	54	35	+19	31	Third place
4	RC España	26	13	4	9	54	48	+6	30	Retired
5	Asturias	26	11	6	9	50	49	+1	28	Retired
6	Atlas	26	10	6	10	49	46	+3	26	
7	Puebla	26	11	3	12	51	54	−3	25	
8	América	26	9	7	10	49	54	−5	25	
9	Marte	26	10	5	11	52	62	−10	25	
10	Tampico	26	8	8	10	43	47	−4	24	
11	Oro	26	8	7	11	64	72	−8	23	
12	Guadalajara	26	7	8	11	47	57	−10	22	
13	Moctezuma	26	5	7	14	43	65	−22	17	Retired
14	San Sebastián	26	5	6	15	41	59	−18	16	

Source: RSSSF

Champions

2nd title

== Results ==
Home \ Away	AME	AST	ATT	ATL	ESP	GDL	LEO	MAR	MOC	ORO	PUE	SSL	TAM	VER
América	—	2–2	3–2	3–1	1–4	2–2	0–1	2–1	5–3	3–3	2–1	2–2	1–3	4–3
Asturias	2–1	—	1–0	3–3	1–2	1–5	3–1	0–2	4–2	4–0	0–2	3–1	2–1	2–2
Atlante	4–1	2–3	—	4–1	2–2	2–0	3–2	4–1	4–3	3–4	5–1	2–0	1–1	2–2
Atlas	3–2	1–1	1–2	—	3–2	1–2	2–1	1–2	6–1	0–1	2–1	4–1	1–2	1–3
RC España	0–2	0–4	4–2	0–2	—	6–1	2–1	1–0	2–0	5–3	2–0	2–0	2–1	1–4
Guadalajara	2–1	4–1	0–0	1–2	2–2	—	0–3	3–3	1–1	1–0	6–4	2–2	1–0	3–3
León	1–1	1–0	2–2	0–1	2–1	4–3	—	4–0	4–0	2–1	2–3	4–0	3–1	0–0
Marte	2–1	2–2	0–2	6–4	1–1	4–0	2–3	—	2–1	3–3	3–4	4–3	2–3	4–1
Moctezuma	2–3	3–1	1–1	2–2	2–4	3–3	2–2	4–2	—	3–4	2–2	2–1	3–1	0–2
Oro	2–2	2–3	2–2	1–3	2–4	2–0	2–5	6–2	3–1	—	2–3	4–3	4–4	6–4
Puebla	4–1	2–3	1–2	3–2	4–0	3–1	1–0	0–1	1–0	2–2	—	3–1	2–2	3–5
San Sebastián	1–2	2–0	2–3	0–0	2–2	2–1	0–3	1–1	0–0	5–2	2–0	—	2–3	2–4
Tampico	1–1	3–3	1–3	2–2	2–0	2–1	2–2	0–1	0–1	3–1	2–0	2–5	—	1–1
Veracruz	2–1	3–1	4–0	0–0	4–3	3–2	3–1	8–1	5–1	2–2	4–1	4–1	2–0	—

Source: RSSSF
Legend: Blue = home team win; Yellow = draw; Red = away team win.

=== Moves ===
After this season Asturias, RC España and Moctezuma retired from the league due to differences with the FMF. Necaxa joined the league.
