= Centro Asturiano de México =

Sports and Social club in Mexico City

Centro Asturiano
- Full name: Centro Asturiano de México A.C.
- Sport: List: badminton; basketball; bolo palma; golf; scuba diving; paddle tennis; squash; swimming; taekwondo; tennis; volleyball
- Founded: February 7, 1918; 108 years ago
- Based in: Mexico D.F.
- Stadium: Parque Asturias
- Colours

Centro Asturiano de México (formerly Club Asturias) is a Mexican sports club located in CDMX Their football club played in the Liga Mexicana de Football Amateur Association, the first and main league prior to the professionalization and development of the Primera División de México in 1943.

Although it was established as a football institution, Centro Asturiano hosts a large variety of activities, with badminton, basketball, bolo palma, golf, scuba diving, paddle tennis, squash, swimming, taekwondo, tennis and volleyball among them.

== History ==
The club was established as "Club Asturias" on 7 February 1918 when a group of Asturian immigrants—including, among others, José Menéndez Aleu, Ángel H. Díaz, Antonio Martínez and Higinio Gutiérrez Peláez—got together and decided to establish a football club that would represent their Asturian heritage.

The main goal was to unite all the Spaniards who had emigrated from Asturias to Mexico, and so imitatively the club enrolled into the Primera Fuerza. Asturias would play in the league from 1919 to 1943, winning two titles in 1922–23 and 1938–39.

When a professional league, Mexican Primera División was created, Asturias was also part of the new league, winning its third title in 1943–44 (and the first professional ever) but the club decided to disaffiliate in 1950, being the last senior championship played by Asturias up to present days.
