= 1943–44 Mexican Primera División season =

1st professional season of the top division of Mexican football

Liga Mayor
- Season: 1943–44
- Champions: Asturias (1st title)
- Matches: 91
- Goals: 454 (4.99 per match)
- Top goalscorer: Isidro Lángara (27 goals)
- Biggest home win: ADO 9–2 Atlas
- Biggest away win: ADO 2–8 RC España
- Highest scoring: RC España 9–3 Veracruz

The 1943–44 season was the inaugural edition of the Mexican professional league known as Liga Mayor, it was the first true national and professional league in Mexico, organized by the Federación Mexicana de Fútbol (FMF). It had 10 participating clubs, which were from Mexico City, Jalisco and Veracruz. Asturias were the first champions.

== Clubs ==
Location of the 1943–44 Mexican Primera División teams

Club	City	Stadium
ADO	Orizaba	Campo Moctezuma
América	Mexico City	Parque Asturias
Atlante	Mexico City	Parque Asturias
Atlas	Guadalajara	Parque Oblatos
Asturias	Mexico City	Parque Asturias
Guadalajara	Guadalajara	Parque Oblatos
Marte	Mexico City	Parque Asturias
Moctezuma	Orizaba	Campo Moctezuma
RC España	Mexico City	Campo España
Veracruz	Veracruz	Parque Deportivo Veracruzano

== League standings ==
Pos	Team	Pld	W	D	L	GF	GA	GD	Pts
1	RC España	18	13	1	4	70	35	+35	27
2	Asturias	18	12	3	3	57	32	+25	27
3	Moctezuma	18	9	3	6	43	34	+9	21
4	Atlante	18	6	6	6	28	31	−3	18
5	Atlas	18	7	4	7	42	50	−8	18
6	Guadalajara	18	8	0	10	50	51	−1	16
7	Veracruz	18	7	2	9	48	57	−9	16
8	América	18	6	1	11	42	58	−16	13
9	Marte	18	4	4	10	32	47	−15	12
10	ADO	18	5	2	11	37	54	−17	12

Source: RSSSF

== Results ==
Home \ Away	ADO	AME	AST	ATL	ATS	ESP	GDL	MAR	MOC	VER
ADO	—	1–6	3–4	0–1	9–2	2–8	3–2	4–0	0–3	2–3
América	1–3	—	2–7	2–5	3–2	2–4	7–2	2–0	1–0	4–6
Asturias	4–1	4–2	—	1–2	2–3	1–1	3–2	7–2	2–2	6–2
Atlante	2–2	3–3	1–1	—	2–2	2–1	1–4	0–0	0–1	3–1
Atlas	3–0	3–0	2–4	3–3	—	0–1	3–7	3–0	3–3	3–1
RC España	5–1	6–1	1–2	2–0	6–2	—	8–2	3–2	2–3	9–3
Guadalajara	5–1	3–1	1–5	0–1	1–3	3–5	—	5–1	3–1	5–1
Marte	0–2	2–3	3–0	5–1	1–1	1–4	1–2	—	4–2	4–2
Moctezuma	3–1	3–1	1–2	2–1	5–1	1–2	3–2	3–3	—	5–1
Veracruz	2–2	4–1	1–2	1–0	2–3	7–2	3–1	3–3	5–2	—

Source: RSSSF
Legend: Blue = home team win; Yellow = draw; Red = away team win.

== Championship playoff ==
A playoff match between Asturias and RC España was held to determine the champions, since both teams ended the season with the same number of points.

16 April 1944

Asturias	4–1	RC España
Menéndez 11'; Aballay 13', 54'; Regueiro 84'		Lángara 90'

Parque Asturias, Mexico City
Referee: Juan J. López

Champions

1st title

=== Moves ===
After this season Unión-León, Oro, and Puebla joined the league.

== Top scorers ==
Rank	Player	Team	Goals
1	(Spain) Isidro Lángara	RC España	27
