= 1936–37 Copa México =

Tournament details
- Country: Mexico
- Teams: 5

Final positions
- Champions: Asturias (5th title)
- Runners-up: América

Tournament statistics
- Matches played: 4
- Goals scored: 37 (9.25 per match)

The 1936–37 Copa México was the 20th staging of this Mexican football cup competition that existed since 1907.

The competition started on October 3, 1937, and concluded on October 24, 1937, in which Asturias lifted the trophy for the fifth time after a 5–3 victory over América.

== Preliminary round ==
October 3

Club España	8–3	Atlante

== Final phase ==
Round 1
June 14
Asturias	4
Necaxa	3
July 8
Club España	5
América	6

Round 2
July 15
Asturias	5
América	3

Copa México 1936–37 winners
Asturias
5th title
