= 1939–40 Copa México =

Tournament details
- Country: Mexico
- Teams: 6

Final positions
- Champions: Asturias (7th Title) (1st title)
- Runners-up: Necaxa

Tournament statistics
- Matches played: 9
- Goals scored: 38 (4.22 per match)

The 1939–40 Copa México was the 24th staging of this Mexican football cup competition that existed from 1907 to 1997.

The competition started on March 28, 1940, and concluded on April 28, 1940, with the final held at the Parque Asturias in México City, in which Asturias lifted the trophy for seventh time after a 1–0 victory over Necaxa.

== Final phase ==
Quarterfinals
Atlante F.C.	4
Club España	6
América	1
Asturias	5
Necaxa	8
Marte	4

Semifinals
Asturias	6
Club España	3
Necaxa
bye

Finals
Asturias	1
Necaxa	0

== QuarterFinals ==
March 28

Atlante F.C.	2 - 0	Club España

March 31

Club España	6 – 2	Atlante F.C.

Atlante eliminated, aggregate 6-4

April 4

América	1 - 5	Asturias

March 31

Asturias	0 - 0	América

Club América eliminated, aggregate 1-5

April 4

Necaxa	6 - 3	Marte

April 14

Marte	1 - 2	Necaxa

Club Deportivo Marte eliminated, aggregate 4-8

== Semifinals ==
April 14

Asturias	unk	Club España

April 18

Club España	3 - 6	Asturias

Club España eliminated, aggregate 3-6
Necaxa byes to Final

== Final ==
April 28

Asturias	1 - 0	Necaxa

Copa México 1939-40 Winners
Asturias
7th Title
