= 1933–34 Copa Mexico =

1933–34 Copa México
Tournament details
- Country: Mexico
- Teams: 6

Final positions
- Champions: Asturias (4th Title) (1st title)
- Runners-up: Necaxa

Tournament statistics
- Matches played: 5
- Goals scored: 29 (5.8 per match)

The 1933–34 Copa México was the 18th staging of this Mexican football cup competition that existed from 1907.

The competition started on July 1, 1934, and concluded on July 15, 1934, and Asturias won the trophy for the fourth time after a 3–0 victory over Necaxa.

== Preliminary round ==
July 1st

Necaxa	9 - 0	Mexico FC

July 1st

Atlante	3 - 1	América

== Final phase ==
Round 1
July 8th
Necaxa	5
Atlante	3
July 8th
Asturias	3
Club España	2

Round 2
July 15th
Necaxa	0
Asturias	3

Copa México 1933-34 Winners
Asturias F.C.
4th Title
