= 1940–41 Copa México =

Tournament details
- Country: Mexico
- Teams: 16

Final positions
- Champions: Asturias (8th Title) (1st title)
- Runners-up: Club España

Tournament statistics
- Matches played: 27

The 1940–41 Copa México Copa México, was the 25th staging of this Mexican football cup competition that existed from 1907 to 1997.

The competition started on March 30, 1941, and concluded on May 18, 1941, with the Final, held at the Parque Asturias in México DF, in which Asturias lifted the trophy for eighth time.

For this edition, Moctezuma and Selección Jalisco did not enter. Also, the team which lose 2 matches is eliminated.

== First round ==
March 30

América	2 - 1	Marte

April 6

Necaxa	3 - 2	Atlante F.C.

April 13

Asturias	unk	Club España

Asturias won

April 17

América	1 - 9	Asturias

April 20

Atlante F.C.	2 - 2 (AET)	Marte

April 24

América	2 - 6	Club España

América eliminated

Replay

April 27

Marte	5 - 2	Atlante F.C.

Atlante eliminated

April 27

Necaxa	2 - 5	Asturias

Asturias bye to final

May 4

Club España	4 - 2	Marte

Marte eliminated

May 11

Necaxa	2 - 4	Club España

Necaxa eliminated

== Final ==
May 18

Asturias	2 - 2 (AET)	Club España

Parque Asturias, Mexico DF

Club España refused to play the Replay match
Asturias was declared champion

Copa México 1940-41 Winners
Asturias
8th Title
