= Casa Universitaria del Libro =

Cultural center of UNAM in Mexico City

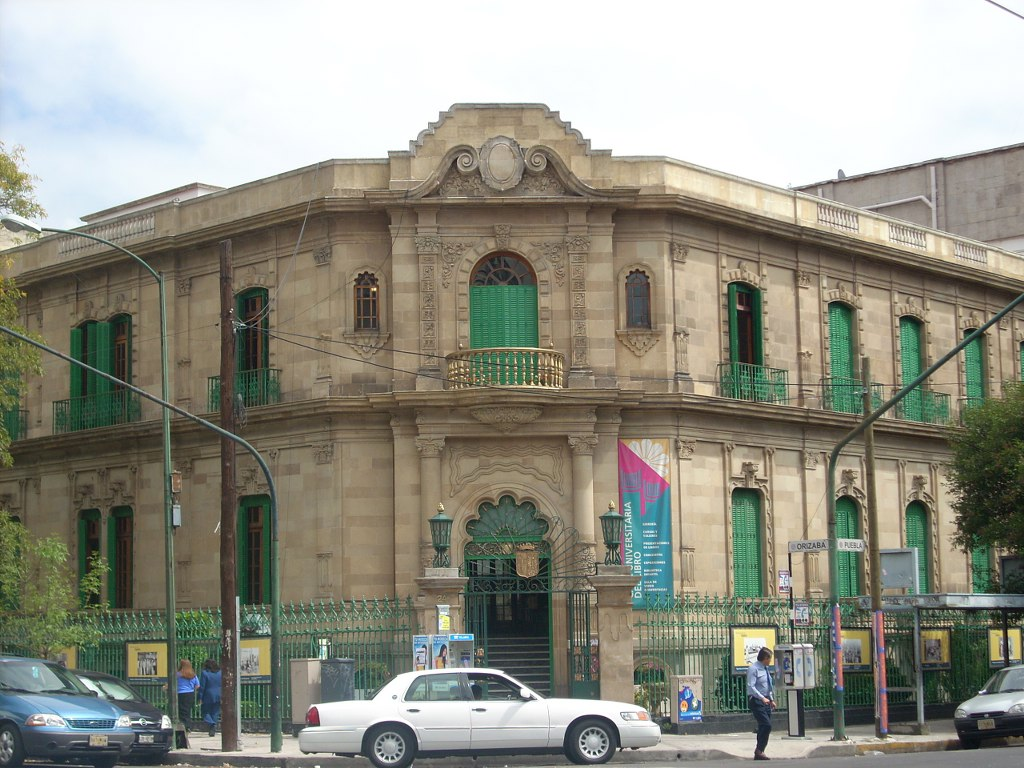
- Main façade
- Alternative names: CASUL

General information
- Type: House
- Architectural style: Eclectic
- Location: Orizaba 24, Roma Norte, Cuauhtémoc, Mexico City, Mexico
- Current tenants: National Autonomous University of Mexico
- Construction started: 1920
- Completed: 1925
- Client: Joaquín Baranda MacGregor
- Owner: Centro Asturiano de México

Website
- casul.unam.mx

The Casa Universitaria del Libro (lit. 'University House of the Book'), known by the acronym CASUL, is a cultural center of the National Autonomous University of Mexico (UNAM) in Colonia Roma, Mexico City. It occupies a house at Orizaba 24, on the corner of Puebla Street, built between 1920 and 1925 for Joaquín Baranda MacGregor and his wife, Dolores Luján. The Centro Asturiano de México, the club of the city's Asturian community, bought the house in 1945 and has lent it to UNAM since 1986 under a comodato, a free loan for use.

The Casa hosts book launches, readings, lectures, courses, workshops, concerts and exhibitions. Since 2022 it has also housed a library of works by women writers, open to the public for reading on site. It is run by UNAM's Coordination of Cultural Diffusion.

== History ==
=== The Baranda house ===
Joaquín Baranda MacGregor and Dolores Luján had the house built between 1920 and 1925. According to the Mexico City government's tourism site, the family did not move in until 1929. The same source notes that the house had a half-basement, an elevator, and separate drains for sewage and rainwater. From 1940 to 1945 the Barandas rented the house to the Brazilian embassy.

=== Centro Asturiano ===
In April 1945 the Centro Asturiano de México bought the house, together with a lot of 2,293 square metres (24,680 sq ft), for 750,000 pesos. The club built an annex next to it with a restaurant, function rooms and a bowling alley, and used the property as its clubhouse until 1985, when it opened new premises.

The club did not want to part with the house after the move. Aurelio González, a member of the cultural committee of the club's board, said in 2018 that the members had not wanted it to become a bank or a restaurant. They lent it to the university, he said, in thanks for Mexico's welcome to Spanish emigrants and in recognition of UNAM's place in the country's cultural life. UNAM's own announcement put that welcome in the years before and during the Franco regime.

=== Casa Universitaria del Libro ===
UNAM gives 10 October 1986 as the date the Casa was established, and 22 October 1986 as the date the club's board handed the building over to the university for a term of ten years. The Enciclopedia de la Literatura en México dates the loan from 10 October and says it could be extended by five years. Rector Jorge Carpizo McGregor inaugurated the Casa on 10 December 1986.

The idea was Carpizo's, with the backing of the coordinator of humanities, Jorge Madrazo: a place to present the university's publications away from the main campus at Ciudad Universitaria. In 1987 Carpizo asked Rosa María Álvarez González, a researcher at UNAM's Institute of Legal Research, to run it. She was its first director. By her account, in her three years in charge the Casa held about 400 book presentations, as well as lectures, exhibitions by university artists, and courses in literature, theatre, bookbinding and ballroom dancing; the danzón class was one of the most requested. The Casa then had a staff of twelve.

The Casa later also housed one of the shops in UNAM's bookstore network, which it still had in 2002, as well as a library, a reading room, and an information center on out-of-print UNAM books, started in 1993, with more than 8,000 titles.

The thirtieth anniversary of the loan, on 22 October 2016, was marked with a ceremony that also launched a remodeling of the house. In its report for that year the Coordination of Humanities said the Casa had doubled its activity from October onward and that its program would be tied more closely to books. In 2018 UNAM said the Casa had held close to 300 events open to the public over the previous two years, with more than 20,000 visitors. After the Chiapas and Puebla earthquakes of September 2017 it served as a collection point for donations.

The Casa was attached to the Coordination of Humanities until August 2018, when it moved to the Coordination of Cultural Diffusion.

=== Directors since 2020 ===
On 4 February 2020 the novelist Rosa Beltrán replaced Ix-Nic Iruegas as director. Beltrán left in early 2022 to become UNAM's coordinator of cultural diffusion, and in February 2022 the journalist Guadalupe Alonso Coratella, head of news at the public television channel Canal 22 from 2015 to 2022, was appointed in her place. Alonso was still director in 2026.

== Biblioteca CASUL de Escritoras ==
In May 2022 the Casa opened the Biblioteca CASUL de Escritoras (CASUL Library of Women Writers), a reading collection of the published work of selected Mexican and Latin American women authors. Its first author was Elena Poniatowska. Margo Glantz's books followed in August 2022, at a tribute held at the Casa. About 40 books by Cristina Pacheco were added in March 2023.

By April 2026 the library had added Rosario Castellanos, Elena Garro, Bárbara Jacobs, Elsa Cross, Beatriz Espejo, Ángeles Mastretta, Ida Vitale, Rosa Nissán, Laura Esquivel, Silvia Molina, Alma Guillermoprieto, Sara Sefchovich, Angelina Muñiz-Huberman, Esther Seligson and Anamari Gomís, all born before 1960. Each author's entry is marked with a small ceremony at which one of her books is stamped with the CASUL seal and, if she is present, signed. The library also keeps UNAM's Vindictas series and the Desbordar el Canon series published by the Universidad Autónoma Metropolitana. The books are shelved in the Salón del Vitral (Stained Glass Room), and readers do not need to register. The collection was built from purchases in new and second-hand bookshops and from donations by publishers, booksellers and the writers' families.

== Building ==
UNAM describes the house as an example of eclectic architecture. Its three-storey façade is faced with carved cantera stone. The entrance leads into a large, irregular hexagonal hall, from which a staircase lit by a leaded stained glass window rises to the upper rooms. The granite floors are laid in black, pink, white and cream in a pattern meant to suggest a turning mill wheel. The rooms were finished with wood and marble paneling, tapestries, plasterwork, stained glass and fine wood floors.

The Casa stands on the corner of Orizaba and Puebla streets, diagonally across from the parish church of the Sagrada Familia and next to the La Covadonga cantina, a block north of Plaza Río de Janeiro.
