= José Luis Saldívar =

Mexican footballer and coach (1954–2014)

Personal information
- Full name: José Luis Saldívar Berrones
- Date of birth: 18 March 1954
- Date of death: 20 August 2014 (aged 60)
- Place of death: León, Mexico
- Height: 1.71 m (5 ft 7 in)

Senior career*
Years	Team	Apps	(Gls)
- Monterrey
- Tampico Madero
- Atlético Potosino

Managerial career
- 1992–1993: Tampico Madero
- 1996: León
- 2000: León
- 2003: Irapuato
- 2003–2004: León
- 2004: Cruz Azul (interim)
- 2005: Correcaminos UAT
- 2005: León
- 2006: Lagartos de Tabasco
- 2006: Dorados de Sinaloa
- 2007: Tampico Madero
- 2009: UAG Tecos
- * Club domestic league appearances and goals

José Luis Saldívar Berrones (Note: In this Spanish name, the first or paternal surname is Saldívar and the second or maternal family name is Berrones.) (18 March 1954 – 20 August 2014) was a Mexican professional football player and coach.

== Career ==
Saldívar played for Monterrey, Tampico Madero and Atlético Potosino.

As a coach, he managed León (four times), Tampico Madero (twice), Irapuato, Correcaminos UAT, Lagartos de Tabasco, Dorados de Sinaloa, and Cruz Azul.

== Death ==
He died on 20 August 2014, aged 60, of a heart attack at his home in León.
