= Liga MX =

Association football league in Mexico

- Organising body: Mexican Professional Football League (Note: Autonomous civil association comprising the owners of the 18 clubs of Liga MX and the Mexican Football Federation, which was created in 2026 to organize the highest level professional leagues for men and women in Mexican football and operating within the legal framework of the federation.)
- Founded: 1943; 83 years ago (Professional era) as Liga Mayor
- Country: Mexico
- Confederation: CONCACAF
- President: Francisco Iturbide Cera
- Number of clubs: 18
- Level on pyramid: 1
- Relegation to: Liga de Expansión MX (Suspended)
- Domestic cup(s): Super cup Campeón de Campeones
- International cup(s): Continental; CONCACAF Champions Cup; Interfederative; Leagues Cup; Campeones Cup
- Current champions: Cruz Azul (10th title)
- Most championships: América (16 titles)
- Most appearances: Óscar Pérez (745)
- Top scorer: Cabinho (312)
- Broadcasters: Domestic; Claro (Note: includes Claro Sports); ESPN (Note: includes ESPN 2, ESPN 3, ESPN+, and Disney+); Fox (Note: Games are produced and streamed by Fox Deportes through Tubi); Televisa (Note: Includes Canal 5, Nueve, Las Estrellas, Sky Sports, Vix, TUDN and Izzi Telecom.); TV Azteca (Note: includes Azteca 7 and Azteca Uno); International; OneFootball (Selected matches in selected markets outside of Mexico)
- Website: ligamx.net
- Current: Apertura 2026 Liga MX season

Liga MX, officially as Liga BBVA MX for sponsorship reasons, is a professional association football league in Mexico and the highest level of the Mexican football league system. The league is contested by 18 participating clubs, the season is divided into two tournaments: Apertura (from July to December) and Clausura (from January to May). The champions of each tournament are decided by a final knockout phase, commonly known as Liguilla. Since 2020, promotion and relegation has been suspended.

Formerly known as Liga Mayor (1943–1949), Campeonato de la Rama Profesional de la FMF (1949–1960) and Primera División Profesional de México (1960–2012). The league has been held in 115 editions, with the inaugural season of the professional era played in 1943–44, and Asturias was crowned the first champion.

Liga MX currently ranks first in CONCACAF's league ranking index. According to the IFFHS, it was ranked as the 10th strongest league in the first decade of the 21st century. According to CONCACAF, the league with an average attendance of 25,557 during the 2014–15 season, draws the largest crowds on average of any football league in the Americas.

Twenty-four clubs have won the title, the most successful club is América with sixteen titles, followed by Guadalajara and Toluca with twelve titles each, Cruz Azul with ten titles, Tigres UANL and León with eight titles each.

== History ==
=== Precursor amateur leagues ===
Prior to the beginning of the Liga Mayor in the professional era of Mexican football, there was no national and professional league in Mexico, and all football competitions were held within relatively small geographical regions. In 1902, an amateur association of football supporters known as Asociación de Aficionados de México en la Liga de Football created the first amateur football league in Mexico known as Liga Mexicana de Football Amateur Association, a local league of clubs near and around Mexico City. The league was held from 1902 to 1920, and the inaugural season was contested by five clubs.

In 1920, a separatist league known as Liga Nacional was created by Real Club España, after its withdrawal from the Liga Mexicana in 1919. The league was held for two seasons (1920–21 and 1921–22), and the inaugural season was contested by five clubs.

The Liga Mexicana and the Liga Nacional are considered the two most relevant precursor amateur leagues, but not as direct predecessors of Liga MX. However, other regional and state leagues were also held in the country: Liga Amateur de Jalisco, Liga Amateur de Veracruz, Liga Amateur de Puebla, Liga Amateur del Bajío, Liga Amateur de Hidalgo and Liga Amateur Mexiquense.

=== Amateur era ===
==== Campeonato de Primera Fuerza/Liga Mayor del Distrito Federal (1922–1943) ====
In 1922, the Federación de Football Association was founded as the first governing body for Mexican football, after the merger of the Liga Mexicana and the Liga Nacional. Inmediately they created the Campeonato de Primera Fuerza, a local league in Mexico City. The league was held from 1922 to 1943, and the inaugural season was contested by eight clubs, however, all participating clubs were from Mexico City. From 1923 to 1927, the competition was organized by the defunct Federación Central de Fútbol.

Since the 1927–28 season, the league was organized by the current Federación Mexicana de Fútbol officially established in 1927 and also taking control of the competition. In 1931, the FMF renamed the league as Liga Mayor del Distrito Federal, and the first matches outside Mexico City were played in the 1940–41 season with the inclusion of Moctezuma and Selección Jalisco.

Many club owners were keen to remain amateur although they paid players under the table. The increasing interest in football would not thwart a unified professional football system in the country.

=== Professional era ===
==== Liga Mayor (1943–1949) ====
The professional era of the league was officially established in 1943. The FMF announced the beginning of a true national and professional league, incorporating clubs from other state local leagues. The league was known as Liga Mayor until 1949, and the inaugural season was contested by ten founding clubs: six clubs from the amateur era of the Liga Mayor, two clubs from the Liga Amateur de Jalisco, and two clubs from the Liga Amateur de Veracruz.

The ten founding clubs were: Asociación Deportiva Orizabeña, América, Asturias, Atlante, Atlas, Guadalajara, Veracruz Sporting, Marte, Moctezuma and Real Club España.

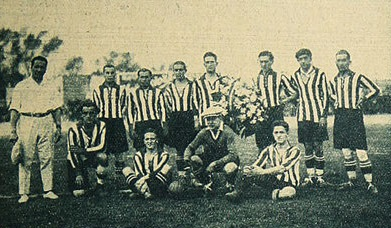
Asturias in 1927.

==== Campeonato de la Rama Profesional de la FMF (1949–1960) ====
For administrative reasons, the Liga Mayor had decided to separate from the FMF, but after several negotiations they were unified again in 1948. This caused different reforms to completely separate and differentiate the profesional league and the amateur branch, due to this the FMF officially renamed the league as Campeonato de la Rama Profesional de la FMF in 1949.

In 1950, another of the new reforms derived was the creation of a second-level professional league for Mexican football, creating the Segunda División Profesional de México. In the 1950–51 season, the first club relegated from the top division was San Sebastián de León and the first club promoted was Zacatepec.

Throughout the late 1950s and early 1960s, many small clubs faced many economic difficulties which were attributed to the lack of international competition by Mexico's clubs and an unrewarding league format. Consequently, clubs from Mexico that placed high in the league standings could not afford to participate in the overarching continental competitions, such as the Copa Libertadores.

==== Primera División Profesional de México (1960–2012) ====
In 1960, after the election of Guillermo Cañedo de la Bárcena as president of the FMF, statutes and regulations of Mexican football were modified. The league was officially renamed as Primera División Profesional de México and also had an autonomous and independent steering committee.

The 1970 World Cup held in Mexico was the first World Cup televised on a grand scale. The season following the FIFA World Cup, the FMF changed the league format and established a final knockout phase to determine the champions. This was done to regenerate interest and reward clubs that placed fairly high in the standings.

The final phase, known as Liguilla, was played using various formats to determine the champions. The most common format was a straight knockout between the top eight clubs in the table. At other times the league was divided into groups with the top two in each group, often as well as the best 3rd placed clubs, qualifying for the liguilla and in some seasons the playoff matches themselves involved clubs playing in groups with the group winners playing off for the title. The format was changed from season to season to accommodate international club commitments and the schedule of the Mexico national team.

The change in the rules affected clubs that traditionally dominated the table, as talented clubs that had not performed well in the regular season were able to perform successfully in the final phase (Cruz Azul in the 1970s, América in the 1980s, and Toluca in the 2000s).

In 1994, the FMF implemented the creation of the Primera División 'A' Profesional de México as the new second-level professional league and an intermediate league between the First and Second Division. The first clubs relegated from the Primera División were Correcaminos UAT and TM Gallos Blancos, and the first club promoted was Atlético Celaya.

==== Liga MX (2012–present) ====
Prior to the start of the 2012–13 season, the organization Liga MX-Ascenso MX was created to replace the FMF as the main organizing body of the competition. The league also announced a rebranding, with the introduction of a new name and a new logo, and officially renamed as Liga MX.

In August 2018, it was announced that Liga MX would begin testing the use of VAR technology. The initial test run was conducted during U-20 matches played inside senior league stadiums, with live testing across senior Liga MX matches taking place during weeks 13 and 14 of the Apertura tournament. The league needed final approval from FIFA to fully implement the technology.

In 2020, Ascenso MX was dissolved and the FMF created the Liga de Expansión MX as a development league and as the replacement in the second level of Mexican football. However, FMF and Liga MX suspended the promotion and relegation between both leagues, arguing for an economic stabilization project after the COVID-19 pandemic and prevent the disappearance of a second level league in Mexico.

On April 2026, Liga MX officials convened and passed a historic decision, by fully separating the Liga MX from the FMF's control, and to make the league a separate company running the domestic competition, while FMF only retains regulation rights. The move took effect on 16 July, creating the Liga Mexicana de Fútbol Profesional (Mexican Professional Football League) an autonomous civil association comprising the owners of the 18 clubs of Liga MX and the Mexican Football Federation, operating within the FMF's legal framework to organize the Liga MX and the Liga Femenil, the highest level professional leagues of Mexican football.

== Competition format ==
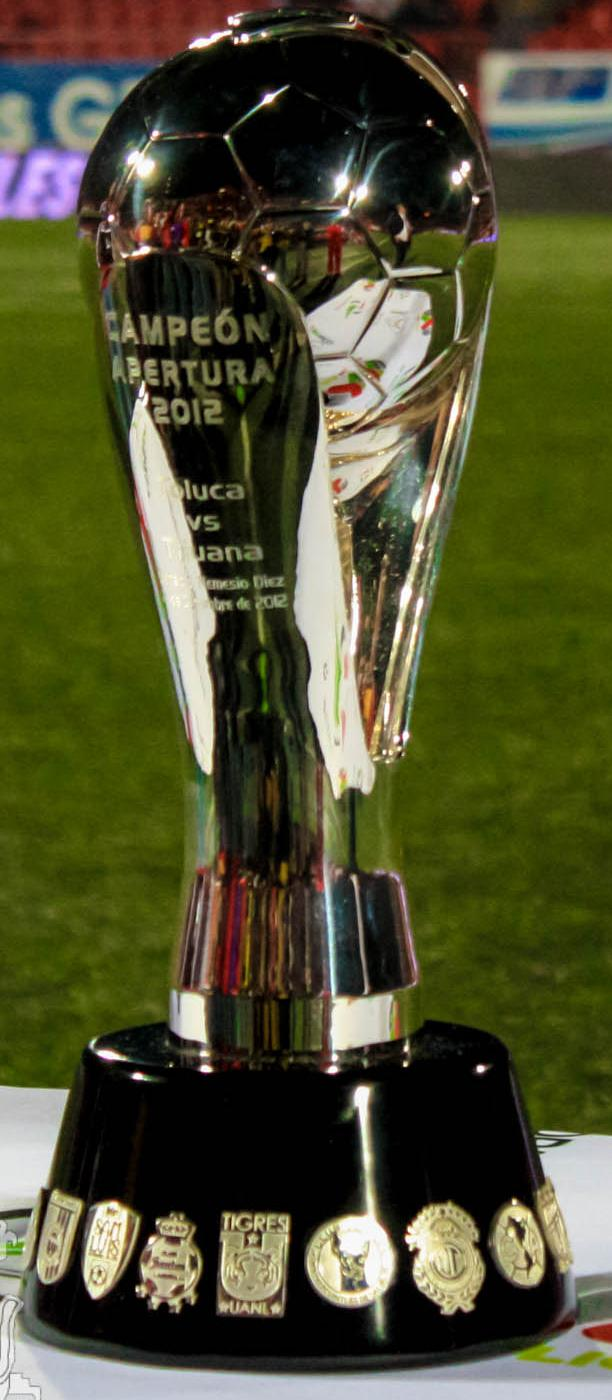
Liga MX Trophy.

=== Regular phase ===
Liga MX uses a single table of 18 clubs that play two short tournaments (Apertura and Clausura) resulting in two champions per season. The season opens with the Apertura from July to December, followed by the Clausura from January to May. This format matches other Latin American schedules and corresponds with FIFA world football calendar, which "opens" in July/August and "closes" in April/May of the next year. The top eight clubs advance to the final knockout phase for each tournament.

From 1996 to 2002, the league followed a schedule consisting of two short tournaments in the season, Invierno and Verano tournaments. From 2002 to 2011, the 18 clubs were divided into three groups of six, with the top two from each group and the two best third-place clubs qualifying for the Liguilla. The clubs played in the same group for each tournament. The qualification phase of the tournament lasted 17 matches, with all clubs playing each other once per tournament in a home and away series over both tournaments.

=== Final phase ===
The final phase of each tournament, commonly known as Liguilla, consisting of eight clubs that qualify for the tournament based on regular phase point totals. The clubs are paired according to seeding, with the highest-seeded club playing the lowest-seeded and so on. Each tie is played over two legs with the winner on aggregate score progressing.

The champions are awarded the Liga MX trophy, and the runners-up is awarded a smaller version of the trophy. The start of Liguilla in 1970 modernized the league despite the disagreements between the traditionalists and the modernists. Clubs that were near bankruptcy were now better able to compete and generate profits.

==== Tie-breaking criteria ====
If at least two clubs finish the regular season with an equal number of points, the following criteria are used to break the tie:

- Goal difference
- Number of goals scored
- Number of away goals scored
- Head-to-head matchup
- Best placed in the general quotient table
- Fair play points in all group matches (only one deduction could be applied to a player in a single match)
  - Yellow card: −1 points
  - Indirect red card by second yellow card: −3 points
  - Direct red card: −3 points
  - Yellow card and direct red card: −5 points
- Drawing of lots.

=== Relegation ===
Originally at the end of a season, after the Apertura and Clausura tournaments, one club was relegated to the next lower division, Ascenso MX, and one club from that division was promoted and took the place left open by the relegated team. The relegated club was determined by computing the points-per-game-played ratio for each club, considering all the games played by the club during the last three seasons (six short tournaments). The club with the lowest ratio is relegated; if the club that was in last place in the relegation table was among the 12 clubs qualifying for the Liguilla at the end of the Clausura tournament, the 13th place team qualified for the Liguilla instead. For clubs recently promoted, only the games played since their promotion are considered (two or four tournaments). The club promoted from Ascenso MX is the winner of the Campeón de Ascenso, the division's super cup between the Apertura and Clausura champions. If a club became the champions in both tournaments, it was automatically promoted.

Prior to the start of the 2017–18 season, the rules for relegation and promotion changed: if a club wins promotion but does not meet certain Liga MX requirements (e.g. stadium infrastructure and a youth team) the relegated Liga MX club of that season will be obligated to pay the prize money to the Ascenso MX club (MXN$120 million) for winning the promotion playoff, which should be utilized to fulfill necessary requirements for promotion within the next season, and remain in Ascenso MX, and the relegated Liga MX club will remain in the top division. However, if the relegated Liga MX club cannot distribute the prize money to the promoted Ascenso MX club, both clubs will lose their right to play in Liga MX and must play in Ascenso MX the following season.

As of the 2018–19 season, only six clubs met the full requirements to be promoted to Liga MX, those clubs being Atlético San Luis, Atlante, Celaya, Juárez, Sinaloa, and Leones Negros UdeG.

On 16 April 2020, the Ascenso MX was folded due to the COVID-19 pandemic as well as the lack of financial resources. Liga MX President Enrique Bonilla later announced during a video meeting with the club owners of the league that promotion and relegation would be suspended for six years. During the suspension, the Ascenso MX was replaced with the Liga de Expansión MX although no club from that league will be promoted to Liga MX nor any Liga MX team that performs poorly will be relegated from the Liga MX for the time being.

In May 2025, a group of ten league member clubs from the Liga de Expansión MX filed a lawsuit before the Court of Arbitration for Sport seeking the reinstatement of promotion and relegation between the Liga de Expansión MX and Liga MX; four clubs subsequently dropped the lawsuit, the six remaining clubs formed an opposing bloc within the league, which was formed with the aim of combating some of the measures that had occurred previously, their first triumph was the rejection of the relocation of Celaya F.C. to Veracruz and the sale of the affiliation certificate between Cimarrones de Sonora and Club Jaiba Brava.

On 4 September 2025, the Court of Arbitration for Sport issued its verdict on the dispute filed by the six Liga de Expansión MX clubs seeking to reinstate promotion to Liga MX. The ruling established the return of relegation on the Liga MX starting with the 2026–27 season; however, the CAS allowed the Mexican Football Federation to retain the authority to establish the requirements for clubs to be promoted to the top flight of Mexican football, returning to a situation similar to that in place before the creation of the Liga de Expansión MX in 2020.

=== CONCACAF Champions Cup qualification ===
Each year, at least six clubs from Liga MX qualify for the CONCACAF Champions Cup, the North American premier club competition; Liga MX itself is guaranteed six spots while teams from the league can earn three more spots via the Leagues Cup with MLS for a maximum of nine spots. Generally, the Apertura and Clausura champions and runners-up, as well as the next best two clubs in the aggregate table, qualify, with the higher ranking champion from the Apertura and Clausura tournaments earning a bye to the Round of 16. Liga MX would implement a formula for ensuring that the Apertura and Clausura had two qualifying clubs should one or more clubs reach the finals of both tournaments, devised when Liga MX sent 4 clubs to North America premier club competition:

- If the same two clubs qualify for the finals of both tournaments, those two clubs will qualify along with the non-finalists with the best record in both the Apertura and Clausura.
- If the same club wins both the Apertura and Clausura (facing two different clubs in the finals of each tournament), then the berth reserved for the Clausura champions is passed to the Clausura runners-up and the berth reserved for the Clausura runners-up is passed to the non-finalists with the best record in the Clausura. This occurred most recently in the 2021–22 season (2023 CONCACAF Champions League) when Atlas (2021 Apertura and Clausura 2022 champions), Pachuca (Clausura 2022 runners-up) and León (Apertura 2022 runners-up) were placed in Pot 1, while Tigres (non-finalists with the best record in the Clausura 2022) were placed in Pot 2 (at the time, the pot placings were determined via the CONCACAF Club Index, which ranked the performance of certain spots within the last 5 years). As of the 2022–23 season, the team that wins both the Apertura and Clausura also automatically qualifies for the Round of 16.
- If the Apertura runners-up win the Clausura (facing two different clubs in the finals of each tournament), then the berth reserved for the Apertura runners-up is passed to the non-finalists with the best record in the Apertura. This occurred most recently in the 2011–12 season (2012–13 CONCACAF Champions League) when Tigres (Apertura 2011 champions) and Santos Laguna (Apertura 2011 runners-up and Clausura 2012 champions) were placed in Pot A, while Guadalajara (non-finalists with the best record in the Apertura 2011) and Monterrey (Clausura 2012 runners-up) were placed in Pot B (at the time, the champions and runners-up were placed in different pots).
- If the Apertura champions are runners-up in the Clausura (facing two different clubs in the finals of each tournament), then the berth reserved for the Clausura runners-up is passed to the non-finalists with the best record in the Clausura. This has not happened since Liga MX began using this qualification procedure.

With Liga MX sending a minimum of six clubs to the Champions Cup (Liga MX can send a maximum of nine clubs if three Liga MX clubs all hold the top three spots in the Leagues Cup), these rules still generally apply, although if a club qualifies for the Champions Cup via Liga MX and the Leagues Cup, the spot is given to the next best club in the aggregate table. If a club is the highest-ranked tournament champion or the champion of both Apertura and Clausura tournaments and also wins the Leagues Cup for that same cycle, both the Apertura and Clausura champions qualify for the round of 16.

=== Qualification for previous international competitions ===
- Championship of Central America and Mexico (1959)
- Copa Interamericana (1969–1992)
- CONCACAF Cup Winners Cup (1991–1995)
- Copa Libertadores (1998–2016)
- Copa Merconorte (2000–2001)
- CONCACAF Giants Cup (2001)
- Copa Sudamericana (2005–2008)

== Participating clubs ==
=== 2026–27 season ===
The 2026–27 Liga MX season has the following 18 participating clubs.

Club	Position Clausura 2026	First season	Current spell	Consecutive tournaments	Total tournaments	Titles	Last title
América	8th	1943–44		115		16	Ape–2024
Atlante	—	1943–44	2026–27	—	89	3	Ape–2007
Atlas	6th	1943–44	1979–80	78	112	3	Cla–2022
Atlético San Luis	14th	2019–20		14		0	—
Cruz Azul	3rd	1964–65		94		10	Cla–2026
Guadalajara	2nd	1943–44		115		12	Cla–2017
Juárez	12th	2019–20		14		0	—
León	10th	1944–45	2012–13	28	91	8	Guard–2020
Monterrey	13th	1945–46	1960–61	98	100	5	Ape–2019
Necaxa	15th	1951–52	2016–17	20	85	3	Inv–1998
Pachuca	4th	1967–68	1998–99	56	66	7	Ape–2022
Puebla	17th	1944–45	2007–08	38	95	2	1989–90
Pumas UNAM	1st	1962–63		96		7	Cla–2011
Querétaro	11th	1990–91	2009–10	34	44	0	—
Santos Laguna	18th	1988–89		68		6	Cla–2018
Tigres UANL	7th	1974–75	1997–98	58	81	8	Cla–2023
Tijuana	9th	2011–12		30		1	Ape–2012
Toluca	5th	1953–54		105		12	Ape–2025

== Stadiums and locations ==
Location of Liga MX clubs in the 2026–27 season.
Location of clubs in Mexico City.

Club	City	Stadium	Capacity
América	Mexico City	Azteca	87,523
Atlante	Mexico City	Azteca	87,523
Atlas	Guadalajara	Jalisco	56,713
Atlético San Luis	San Luis Potosí	Libertad Financiera	25,111
Cruz Azul	Mexico City	Azteca	87,523
Guadalajara	Guadalajara metropolitan area	Akron	45,364
Juárez	Juárez	Olímpico Benito Juárez	19,703
León	León	León	31,297
Monterrey	Monterrey metropolitan area	BBVA	53,500
Necaxa	Aguascalientes	Victoria	25,500
Pachuca	Pachuca	Hidalgo	25,922
Puebla	Puebla	Cuauhtémoc	51,726
Pumas UNAM	Mexico City	Olímpico Universitario	72,000
Querétaro	Querétaro	Corregidora	33,162
Santos Laguna	Torreón	Corona	30,000
Tigres UANL	Monterrey metropolitan area	Universitario	42,000
Tijuana	Tijuana	Caliente	27,333
Toluca	Toluca	Nemesio Diez	30,000

== Performances ==
Rank	Club	Titles	Runner-up	Seasons
1	América	16	11	1965–66, 1970–71, 1975–76, 1983–84, 1984–85, Prode–1985, 1987–88, 1988–89, Ver–2002, Cla–2005, Cla–2013, Ape–2014, Ape–2018, Ape–2023, Cla–2024, Ape–2024
2	Guadalajara	12	10	1956–57, 1958–59, 1959–60, 1960–61, 1961–62, 1963–64, 1964–65, 1969–70, 1986–87, Ver–1997, Ape–2006, Cla–2017
2	Toluca	12	8	1966–66, 1967–68, 1974–75, Ver–1998, Ver–1999, Ver–2000, Ape–2002, Ape–2005, Ape–2008, Bic–2010, Cla–2025, Ape–2025
4	Cruz Azul	10	12	1968–69, Mex–1970, 1971–72, 1972–73, 1973–74, 1978–79, 1979–80, Inv–1997, Guard–2021, Cla–2026
5	León	8	7	1947–48, 1948–49, 1951–52, 1955–55, 1991–92, Ape–2013, Cla–2014, Guard–2020
5	Tigres UANL	8	7	1977–78, 1981–82, Ape–2011, Ape–2015, Ape–2016, Ape–2017, Cla–2019, Cla–2023
7	Pumas UNAM	7	9	1976–77, 1980–81, 1990–91, Cla–2004, Ape–2004, Cla–2009, Cla–2011
7	Pachuca	7	4	Inv–1999, Inv–2001, Ape–2003, Cla–2006, Cla–2007, Cla–2016, Ape–2022
9	Santos Laguna	6	6	Inv–1996, Ver–2001, Cla–2008, Cla–2012, Cla–2015, Cla–2018
10	Monterrey	5	7	Mex–1986, Cla–2003, Ape–2009, Ape–2010, Ape–2019
11	Atlante	3	4	1946–47, 1992–93, Ape–2007
11	Atlas	3	3	1950–51, Ape–2021, Cla–2022
11	Necaxa	3	3	1994–95, 1995–96, Inv–1998
14	Puebla	2	2	1982–83, 1989–90
14	Zacatepec^{2}	2	1	1954–55, 1957–58
14	Veracruz^{5}	2	0	1945–46, 1949–50
17	Oro^{3}	1	5	1962–63
17	Monarcas Morelia^{1}	1	3	Inv–2000
17	Real Club España^{5}	1	1	1944–45
17	Tecos UAG^{4}	1	1	1993–94
17	Asturias^{5}	1	0	1943–44
17	Tampico^{5}	1	0	1952–53
17	Marte^{5}	1	0	1953–54
17	Tijuana	1	0	Ape–2012
25	Leones Negros UdeG^{1}	0	3	—
25	Tampico Madero^{1}	0	2	—
25	Atlético Español^{5}	0	1	—
25	Atlético Celaya^{2}	0	1	—
25	Toros Neza^{4}	0	1	—
25	San Luis^{5}	0	1	—
25	Querétaro	0	1	—

Notes

1. Currently in Liga de Expansión MX.
2. Currently in Liga Premier.
3. Currently in Liga TDP.
4. Currently on hiatus.
5. Defunct.

== Media coverage ==
All Liga MX clubs have the right to sell their own broadcast rights. Televisa, TV Azteca, Imagen Televisión, Claro Sports, Fox Sports, and ESPN have broadcasting rights in México, while ESPN Deportes, Fox Deportes, Univision, and Telemundo have the rights in the United States, with FS1/FS2 airing select matches with English commentary.

In previous years, when a club was relegated, the club that was promoted could only negotiate with the company holding the television rights of the relegated club. This agreement was canceled by Liga MX in 2012 when the promotion of Club León caused a television rights dispute with Televisa. Currently, Club León matches are broadcast in Mexico by Fox Sports and other online media sites, and in the United States by Univision (Telemundo from 2013 to 2016).

Telelatino and Fox Sports World formerly hold broadcasting rights in Canada. From 2019–20 until 2021–22, OneSoccer broadcast the league for Canada viewers. Fox Sports is the only network that holds rights to broadcast selected matches in United States and South America. Additionally, Televisa-owned networks Sky Sports and TUDN hold exclusive broadcasting rights over selected matches throughout the regular season, although the majority of the most important ones are broadcast live on the national networks. The coverage also available for Central America viewers.

Most of the Saturday afternoon and evening matches broadcast by Televisa are shown primarily on Gala TV, though Saturday games played by Televisa's club America, are broadcast on Televisa's flagship network, Canal de las Estrellas. However, a blackout policy is usually applied in selected markets where affiliates are forced to air alternate programming during the matches, Sunday noon and afternoon games broadcast by Televisa are shown on Canal de las Estrellas. All of the games broadcast by TV Azteca on Saturday and Sunday are shown on Azteca 13; Friday's matches however are shown on Azteca 7. Tuesday, Wednesday and Thursday (known in Mexico as Fecha Doble or Double Date) matches picked by the national networks are shown on Canal 5 and Azteca 7 and the rest of the matches air on Sky Sports and TDN.

Since 2011, the final match of every season is played on Sunday during prime time, regardless of whether the club used to play local games in another timeslot, in order to capture more television audience during the game. This also prevents most playoff collusion, where one or both clubs already in the Liguilla put in lesser effort to lose or draw, in order to draw a more favorable opponent.

For the Apertura 2016, and the majority of the Clausura 2017, Guadalajara home matches in Mexico were not shown on over-the-air television or cable and satellite operators. Instead, they were exclusively shown on an internet streaming service known as Chivas TV. As of 8 April 2017, the matches are shown on both Televisa's Televisa Deportes Network (TDN) and Chivas TV.

On 13 February 2017, it was announced Univision Deportes would live stream 46 games in English on Facebook in the United States. After the Clausura 2017 season, Azteca América sold the rights of Atlas, Morelia, Tijuana, and Veracruz matches to Univision. The network then held the rights of 17 of 18 clubs, only missing recently promoted Lobos BUAP. In September 2017, Univision began airing Lobos BUAP's home matches, thus holding the rights to all 18 Liga MX teams through the end of the Clausura 2018 season.

In July 2017, Televisión Nacional de Chile (TVN) announced it would show Liga MX matches involving Chilean players in Chile. In October 2017, Fox Sports announced that it acquired the long-term exclusive Spanish-language rights to Tijuana and Santos Laguna home matches in the United States, Mexico, and the rest of Latin America starting in the Apertura 2018 and Apertura 2019 respectively, thus ending Univision's monopoly. The matches air on Fox Sports in the United States (via Fox Deportes) and the rest of Latin America (including Mexico and excluding Brazil).

On 26 May 2018, Fox Sports announced it acquired the rights of C.F. Monterrey's home matches in the United States and Latin America. The network announced the matches would be shown in the United States on Fox Deportes in Spanish as well as the Fox Sports family of networks in English.

As of the Apertura 2019 season, via a sublicense agreement with Univision, ESPN Deportes airs the majority of León, Necaxa, Pachuca, Querétaro, and Tigres regular season home matches in the United States. The network also airs at least one home match of nine other clubs. Televisa also sublicenses one match per week to ESPN in Mexico and Central America.

In Brazil, DAZN broadcast the league for two seasons 2019–20 and 2020–21. On 15 July 2021, OneFootball announced it would broadcast between two and five live matches as part of a deal covering the 2021/22 Liga MX season in selected international markets. On 16 August 2021, Eleven Sports announced it would broadcast the home Liga MX matches of C.D. Guadalajara for the 2021–22 season in more than 100 countries.

=== Broadcast rights ===
Club	Television		Streaming	
Club	Mexico	United States	Mexico	United States
América	Televisa	Univision	Vix	
Atlas	Televisa	Univision	Vix	
Atlante	TV Azteca; ESPN	Univision	Disney+	Vix
Atlético San Luis	ESPN	Univision	Disney+ Vix	Vix
Cruz Azul	Televisa	Univision	Vix	
Guadalajara	None (Note: Guadalajara home matches in Mexico are not shown on over-the-air television or cable and satellite operators, instead they exclusively are shown on an internet streaming service named Chivas TV. The service is also available on Prime Video.)	Fox Sports (Note: Matches only air on tape delay.); NBCUniversal (Note: Matches air on the NBCUniversal family of networks (Telemundo and Universo).)	Chivas TV; Prime Video	Peacock
Juárez	Fox; TV Azteca	Estrella TV; Fox Sports (Note: Matches are shown on Fox Deportes in Spanish as well as the Fox Sports family networks (FS1, FS2 and Fox Soccer Plus.)); NBCUniversal	Fox One; Tubi	Estrella TV (Note: Estrella TV is available for streaming through various platforms, including Pluto TV, The Roku Channel, Tubi and the network's app.); Fox One
León	Fox	Univision	Fox One; Tubi	Vix
Monterrey	Televisa	Univision	Vix	
Necaxa	Fox	Fox Sports	Fox One	
Pachuca	Fox	Univision	Fox One; Tubi	Vix
Puebla	TV Azteca; ESPN	Univision	TV Azteca Digital; Disney+	Vix
Pumas UNAM	Televisa	Univision	Vix	
Querétaro	Fox	Univision	Fox One; Tubi	Vix
Santos Laguna	ESPN; Televisa	Univision	Disney+ Vix	Vix
Tigres UANL	Fox; TV Azteca	Estrella TV; Fox Sports; NBCUniversal	Fox One; Tubi	Estrella TV; Fox One
Tijuana	Fox	Univision	Fox One; Tubi	Vix
Toluca	Televisa; TV Azteca; Fox	Univision	Fox One; Tubi; Vix	Vix

== Sponsorship ==
Since 2012, sponsor of the league.

BBVA México has been the official main sponsor of the league since its rebranding in 2012, hence it is officially known as Liga BBVA MX. In July 2013, the league president Decio De María stated that the money generated from the sponsorship would be divided among the 18 clubs and to be invested in each club's youth teams. Since 1986, the official ball of the league is manufactured by Voit.

== Managers ==
Current managers of Liga MX clubs:

Manager	Club	Appointed	Time as manager
(Argentina) Antonio Mohamed	Toluca	11 December 2024	1 year, 345 days
(Uruguay) Sebastián Abreu	Tijuana	30 April 2025	1 year, 205 days
(Argentina) Gabriel Milito	Guadalajara	26 May 2025	1 year, 179 days
(Chile) Esteban González	Querétaro	6 December 2025	350 days
(Argentina) Javier Gandolfi	León	20 March 2026	246 days
(Mexico) Joel Huiqui	Cruz Azul	22 April 2026	213 days
(Mexico) Miguel Herrera	Atlante	28 April 2026	207 days
(Mexico) Gerardo Espinoza	Puebla	19 May 2026	186 days
(Portugal) Renato Paiva	Santos Laguna	19 May 2026	186 days
(Argentina) Matías Almeyda	Monterrey	21 May 2026	184 days
(Mexico) Diego Mejía	Atlético San Luis	31 May 2026	174 days
(Uruguay) Guillermo Almada	América	7 June 2026	167 days
(Mexico) Benjamín Mora	Pachuca	10 June 2026	164 days
(Argentina) Esteban Solari	Pumas UNAM	21 June 2026	153 days
(Argentina) Hernán Crespo	Atlas	16 July 2026	128 days
(Mexico) Víctor Manuel Vucetich (interim)	Tigres UANL	20 August 2026	93 days
(Argentina) Gustavo Lema	Juárez	2 September 2026	80 days
(Peru) Juan Reynoso	Necaxa	14 September 2026	68 days

== Manager records ==
=== Managers with the most league titles ===
Rank	Manager	Period	Titles
1	(Mexico) Ignacio Trelles	1951–1991	7
1	(Brazil) (Mexico) Ricardo Ferretti	1991–2023	7
3	(Mexico) Raúl Cárdenas	1966–1998	6
4	(Mexico) Javier de la Torre	1955–1984	5
4	(Mexico) Manuel Lapuente	1978–2013	5
4	(Mexico) Víctor Manuel Vucetich	1990–present	5
4	(Argentina) (Mexico) Antonio Mohamed	2004–present	5
8	(Mexico) Enrique Meza	1982–2019	4
9	(Hungary) Árpád Fekete	1957–1990	3
9	(Mexico) José Manuel de la Torre	2006–2024	3
9	(Brazil) André Jardine	2022–2026	3

Notes

- Italic – Currently managing in Liga MX.

=== Managers with the most appearances ===
Rank	Manager	Period	Matches
1	(Brazil) (Mexico) Ricardo Ferretti	1991–2023	1223
2	(Mexico) Ignacio Trelles	1951–1991	1081
3	(Mexico) Víctor Manuel Vucetich	1990–present	944
4	(Chile) Carlos Reinoso	1981–2017	800
5	(Mexico) Enrique Meza	1982–2019	799
6	(Mexico) Alberto Guerra	1975–2003	789
7	(Argentina) Ricardo La Volpe	1983–2019	781
8	(Uruguay) Carlos Miloc	1961–1998	770
9	(Mexico) Miguel Herrera	2002–present	744
10	(Mexico) Antonio Carbajal	1961–1994	702

Notes

- Italic – Currently managing in Liga MX.

== Player records ==
=== Players with the most appearances ===
Rank	Player	Period	Matches
1	(Mexico) Óscar Pérez	1993–2019	741
2	(Mexico) Oswaldo Sánchez	1993–2014	725
3	(Mexico) Benjamín Galindo	1979–2001	700
4	(Mexico) Juan Pablo Rodríguez	1997–2018	685
5	(Mexico) Jesús Corona	2002–2025	682
6	(Chile) Rodrigo Ruiz	1994–2013	638
7	(Mexico) Adolfo Ríos	1985–2004	635
8	(Mexico) Miguel España	1983–2003	631
9	(Mexico) Julio César Domínguez	2006–2026	629
10	(Mexico) Alfonso Sosa	1985–2004	610

=== Players with the most goals scored ===
Rank	Player	Period	Goals	Matches	Ratio
1	(Brazil) Evanivaldo Castro	1974–1987	312	427	0.73
2	(Mexico) Carlos Hermosillo	1984–2001	294	534	0.55
3	(Mexico) Jared Borgetti	1994–2010	252	475	0.63
4	(Paraguay) José Saturnino Cardozo	1994–2005	249	332	0.75
5	(Mexico) Horacio Casarín	1936–1957	238	326	0.73
6	(Chile) Osvaldo Castro	1971–1984	214	398	0.54
7	(Mexico) Luís Roberto Alves	1986–2003	209	577	0.36
8	(Mexico) Adalberto López	1942–1955	201	231	0.87
9	(Brazil) Carlos Eloir Perucci	1972–1984	199	398	0.5
10	(France) André-Pierre Gignac	2015–2026	193	373	0.52

== Promotion and relegation ==
Club	Promoted	Relegated
Zacatepec	5 (1950–51, 1962–63, 1969–70, 1977–78, 1983–84)	5 (1961–62, 1965–66, 1976–77, 1982–83, 1984–85)
Pachuca	4 (1966–67, 1991–92, 1995–96, 1997–98)	3 (1972–73, 1992–93, 1996–97)
Irapuato	4 (1953–54, 1984–85, 1999–00, 2002–03)	2 (1971–72, 1990–91)
San Luis	4 (1970–71, 1975–76, 2001–02, 2004–05)	2 (1973–74, 2003–04)
Atlas	3 (1954–55, 1971–72, 1978–79)	3 (1953–54, 1970–71, 1977–78)
Unión de Curtidores	3 (1974–75, 1982–83, 1998–99 (Note: Puebla bought the franchise of Unión de Curtidores to remain in the league.))	2 (1980–81, 1983–84)
La Piedad	3 (1951–52, 2000–01, 2012–13 (Note: Veracruz bought the franchise of La Piedad, taking its spot in the league.))	1 (1952–53)
Veracruz	2 (1963–64, 2001–02)	5 (1951–52, 1978–79, 1997–98, 2007–08, 2018–19 (Note: Veracruz remained in the league by paying a fine of 120 million pesos.))
Atlante	2 (1976–77, 1990–91)	3 (1975–76, 1989–90, 2013–14)
Querétaro	2 (2005–06, 2008–09)	3 (1993–94, 2006–07, 2012–13 (Note: Querétaro remained in the league by acquiring the franchise of Jaguares de Chiapas.))
Deportivo Zamora	2 (1954–55, 1956–57)	2 (1955–56, 1959–60)
Ciudad Madero/ Refinería Madero	2 (1964–65, 1972–73)	2 (1966–67, 1974–75)
Cobras de Juárez/ Cobras de Querétaro	2 (1985–86, 1987–88)	2 (1986–87, 1991–92)
León	2 (1989–90, 2011–12)	2 (1986–87, 2001–02)
Dorados de Sinaloa	2 (2003–04, 2014–15)	2 (2005–06, 2015–16)
Necaxa	2 (2009–10, 2015–16)	2 (2008–09, 2010–11)
Monterrey	2 (1955–56,1959–60)	1 (1956–57)
Morelia/ Atlético Morelia	2 (1956–57, 1980–81)	1 (1967–68)
Celaya/ Atlético Celaya	2 (1957–58, 1994–95)	1 (1960–61)
Tigres UANL	2 (1973–74, 1996–97)	1 (1995–96)
Tampico	1 (1958–59)	3 (1957–58, 1962–63, 1981–82)
Correcaminos UAT	1 (1986–87)	2 (1987–88, 1994–95)
Puebla	1 (2006–07)	2 (1998–99, 2004–05)
Cuautla	1 (1954–55)	1 (1958–59)
Nacional	1 (1960–61)	1 (1964–65)
Jabatos de Nuevo León	1 (1965–66)	1 (1968–69)
Atlético Potosino	1 (1973–74)	1 (1988–89)
Tecos UAG/ Estudiantes Tecos	1 (1974–75)	1 (2011–12)
Toros UTN/ Toros Neza	1 (1992–93)	1 (1999–00)
Tampico Madero/ TM Gallos Blancos	1 (1993–94)	1 (1994–95)
Indios de Ciudad Juárez	1 (2007–08)	1 (2009–10)
Leones Negros UdeG	1 (2013–14)	1 (2014–15)
Lobos BUAP	1 (2016–17)	1 (2017–18)
Toluca	1 (1952–53)	—
Pumas UNAM	1 (1961–62)	—
Cruz Azul	1 (1963–64)	—
Laguna	1 (1967–68)	—
Torreón	1 (1968–69)	—
Atletas Campesinos	1 (1979–80)	—
Oaxtepec-IMSS	1 (1981–82)	—
Potros Neza	1 (1988–89 (Note: Veracruz bought the franchise of Potros Neza, taking its spot in the league.))	—
Tijuana	1 (2010–11)	—
Atlético San Luis	1 (2018–19)	—
Cafetaleros de Tapachula	1 (2017–18 (Note: Cafetaleros did not obtain certification for promotion.))	—
San Sebastián de León	—	1 (1950–51)
Marte	—	1 (1954–55)
Jalisco	—	1 (1979–80)
Colibríes de Morelos	—	1 (2002–03)
Jaguares de Chiapas	—	1 (2016–17)

== See also ==
- Sport in Mexico
- Football in Mexico
- Mexican football league system
- Mexican Football Federation
- Liga de Expansión MX
- Liga Premier
- Liga TDP
- Ascenso MX
- Copa MX
- Campeón de Campeones
- Supercopa MX
- Primera Fuerza
- Liga Femenil
- List of foreign Liga MX players
