= 1922–23 Campeonato de Primera Fuerza season =

Campeonato de Primera Fuerza
- Season: 1922–23
- Champions: Asturias FC (1st title)
- Matches: 56
- Goals: 137 (2.45 per match)

The 1922–23 season was the inaugural edition of the new amateur football league in Mexico called Campeonato de Primera Fuerza (English: First Force Championship). It was organized by the Federación Mexicana de Football Asociación (English: Mexican Association Football Federation), which was the first football federation formed in Mexico after the merger of the Liga Mexicana and Liga Nacional to create the new competition on August 28, 1922. It had 8 participating clubs and all from Mexico City.

== Standings ==
Pos	Team	Pld	W	D	L	GF	GA	GD	Pts
1	Asturias FC	14	11	2	1	28	10	+18	24
2	Germania FV	14	11	1	2	29	12	+17	23
3	Club América	14	9	1	4	23	12	+11	19
4	RC España	14	7	3	4	20	12	+8	17
5	Tranvias	14	4	1	9	11	20	−9	9
6	Club México	14	1	6	7	10	18	−8	8
7	Luz y Fuerza	14	2	3	9	10	25	−15	7
8	Guerra y Marina	14	2	1	11	6	28	−22	5

Source: RSSSF
