= CF Asturias =

Mexican sports club

- Full name: Club de Fútbol Asturias
- Nickname: Asturianos (Asturians)
- Short name: AST
- Founded: 7 February 1918; 108 years ago (as Club Asturias)
- Dissolved: 1950; 76 years ago
- Ground: Parque Asturias; Mexico City
- Capacity: 25,000
- 1949–50: 5°
Home colours

Club de Fútbol Asturias, currently as Centro Asturiano de México, was a Mexican sports club based in Mexico City. Founded in 1918 as Club Asturias, the club played in the Liga Mexicana de Football Amateur Association (1919–1922), and also in the Campeonato de Primera Fuerza/Liga Mayor (1922–1943). Asturias was one of the founding members of the Liga Mayor (currently Liga MX), the first professional league in Mexico, which the club participated in from 1943 until its dissolution in 1950.

Asturias would overcome Real Club España, club along which were known as the "foreign legion (Legión extranjera)" in the 1943–44 season after finishing with a similar record. The first final in the Mexican professional league was won by Asturias after beating R.C. España by 4–1 and thus becoming the first champion in the professional era. The club was managed by Ernesto Pauler.

Besides having the honour of being the first champion in the professional league, Asturias also holds the record for most amateur cup tournaments with 8 titles (5 Copa México titles, one Copa Tower and two Copa Eliminatoria titles).

== History ==
The club was established as "Club Asturias" on February 7, 1918, when a group of Asturian immigrants—including, among others, José Menéndez Aleu, Ángel H. Díaz, Antonio Martínez and Higinio Gutiérrez Peláez—got together and decided to establish a football club that would represent their Asturian heritage.

The main goal was to unite all the Spaniards who had emigrated from Asturias to Mexico, and so imitatively the club enrolled into the Primera Fuerza but the league would only admit the club if they beat Germania, América and Tigres. They managed to beat Germania by 3–0, Tigres by 1–0 but only drew 3–3 against América, so the club would not be allowed to join the league. The club decided to form its own league calling it "Unión Nacional de Association Foot-Ball". The league would be played in the Campo Asturias which was constructed in the Paseo de la Reforma of Mexico City. The league would not charge any fee to watch the games, which encouraged locals to attend this league and not the Primera Fuerza. With this problem in hand the Primera Fuerza changed its mind and allowed the club to take part in the upcoming 1919 tournament. In 1920 the club hired Scottish former player Gerald Brown and the club managed to wins its first tournament by winning the 1920 Copa Covadonga. In 1921 the club changed its name to "Sección Deportiva del Centro Asturiano".

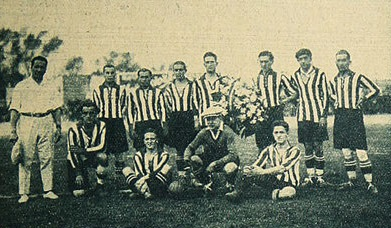
Asturias F.C. team that played Chilean club Colo Colo in 1927.

This club would go on to win important cups like the Copa Centenario in 1921. The club would also win the most Copa Mexico in its history before being dissolved in 1996 winning a total of eight, one more than Necaxa. This club also had the honour of being the first champion in the professional era after financing the 1943–44 tournament tied with Real Club España, where a decisive game had to play in the Asturias Park where the club defeated Real Club España 4–1.

The club would go on to play a few more years in the league, finishing no better than fifth until after the 1949–50 tournament along with Real Club España and Moctezuma de Orizaba retired from the league due to differences with the Federation. Necaxa (México), an old Primera Fuerza member who didn't accept professionalism in 1943, re-joined to fill the vacant place.

== Club seasons ==
=== Amateur era ===
Club's participations in the Liga Mexicana de Football Amateur Association (1919–1922) and Campeonato de Primera Fuerza/Liga Mayor (1922–1943).

Year	Position	Games played	Won	Tied	Lost	Goals Scored	Goals Against	Points	Postseason place
1919–20	3	16	9	2	5	21	14	20	Third Place
1921–22	0	0	0	0	0	0	0	0	Was not Held
1922–23	1	14	11	2	1	28	10	24	Champion
1923–24	3	16	8	4	4	25	9	20	Third Place
1924–25	4	12	4	3	5	10	9	11	
1925–26	6	12	2	1	9	10	35	5	
1926–27	6	12	4	0	8	24	31	8	
1927–28	2	14	5	8	1	39	28	18	Runner Up
1928–29	6	8	3	1	4	22	25	7	
1929–30	4	14	6	5	3	34	22	17	
1930–31	0	0	0	0	0	0	0	0	Was not Held
1931–32	3	14	9	2	3	40	34	20	Third Place
1932–33	8	8	1	3	4	13	18	5	Avoided Relegation
1933–34	2	10	6	1	3	29	17	13	Runner Up
1934–35	??	??	??	??	??	??	??	??	
1935–36	4	8	2	3	3	14	16	7	
1936–37	5	8	2	1	5	16	24	5	
1937–38	2	10	7	0	3	31	14	14	Runner Up
1938–39	1	12	7	2	3	30	27	16	Champion
1939–40	5	15	5	2	8	32	33	12	
1940–41	5	14	5	2	7	25	20	12	
1941–42	8	14	4	1	9	30	42	9	
1942–43	8	14	4	2	8	28	35	10	

After the 1942–43 season the league became professional and changed its name to Liga Mayor.

=== Professional era ===
Club's participations in the Liga Mayor (1943–1950).

Year	Position	Games played	Won	Tied	Lost	Goals Scored	Goals Against	Points	Postseason place
1943–44	1	18	12	3	3	57	32	27	Champion
1944–45	5	24	12	2	10	72	66	26	
1945–46	10	30	12	4	14	71	74	28	
1946–47	9	28	10	5	13	53	65	25	
1947–48	15	28	6	7	15	41	62	19	
1948–49	5	28	12	6	10	58	44	30	
1949–50	5	26	11	6	9	50	49	28	

After this season, Asturias, Real Club España and Moctezuma retired from the league due to differences with the Federation. Necaxa (México), an old Primera Fuerza member which didn't accept professionalism in 1943, re-joined for next season.

== Honours ==
=== Top division ===
- Liga Mayor
  - Champions (1): 1943–44
- Campeón de Campeones
  - Runners-up (1): 1944

=== Amateur ===
- Campeonato de Primera Fuerza/Liga Mayor: 1922–23, 1937–38
- Copa Tower: 1921–22
- Copa Eliminatoria: 1922–23, 1923–24
- Copa México: 1933–34, 1936–37, 1938–39, 1939–40, 1940–41

== See also ==
- Centro Asturiano de México
- Asturians
