= Club León =

Association football club in Mexico

León
- Full name: Club León
- Nicknames: Los Panzas Verdes (The Green Bellies); La Fiera (The Wild Beast); Los Esmeraldas (The Emeralds); Los Verdiblancos (The Green and Whites)
- Short name: LEO
- Founded: 31 August 1943; 83 years ago (as Unión-León)
- Stadium: Estadio León
- Capacity: 31,297
- Owner: Grupo Pachuca
- President: Jesús Martínez Murguia
- Manager: Javier Gandolfi
- League: Liga MX
- Apertura 2026: Regular phase: 7th of 18; Final phase: TBD
- Website: clubleon.mx
Home colours	Away colours	Third colours

Club León is a professional football club based in León, Guanajuato. The club competes in Liga MX, the highest level of Mexican football, and plays its home matches at Estadio León. Founded in 1943 as Unión-León by the merger of Unión de Curtidores and the Selección de Guanajuato. The club's debut in top-level league was in the 1944–45 season.

In domestic competitions, Club León has won eight Liga MX titles, five Copa MX titles and five Campeón de Campeones. After winning the league and cup in 1949, it became the first "Mexican Campeonísimo". In international competitions, the club has won one CONCACAF Champions League and one Leagues Cup.

The club was last relegated to Primera División A in 2002, after ten years compiting in the second-level league, León achieved promotion in 2012. A year and a half after its promotion, León won both tournaments in the 2013–14 Liga MX season (Apertura 2013 and Clausura 2014), becoming in the second "Mexican Bicampeón" in the era of short tournaments. The club has partnerships with Fox Sports Latinoamérica in Mexico and Telemundo Deportes in the United States. Since 2016, TUDN holds the U.S. broadcasting rights to León home games. León is ranked No. 29 in the IFFHS Central and North America's best clubs of the 20th century.

== History ==
The club was created from an application by Unión de Curtidores which merged with Selección de Guanajuato. With the money raised, the directive hired Marcial Ortiz, Raúl Varela, Alfonso Montemayor, Salvador Ramírez, Conrado Muñiz, Vicente Serrano, Pepe Cortes, "Sticks" Ramírez, Elpidio Sánchez, and Joaquín Source Duillo Dobles. It participated in the Liga Mayor's second season (1944–45). The team comprised Argentine players and Miguel Rugilo that served as coach and goalkeeper holder. Battaglia played defense plus two fronts; Marcos Aurelio scored 14 goals with Ángel Fernández. The team debuted at the Patria stadium on August 20, 1944, against Atlante and lost by a score of 5–3.

In the 1945–46 season, another team appeared in the city: the San Sebastián de León. They placed fourth out of 16 teams with 30 games, 17 wins, 4 draws, 9 losses for 38 points. Their top scorer, with 24 goals, Alberto Mendoza.

In the 1946–47 season notable players joined, one of whom was Adalberto López, who scored 33 goals. In general, the team had a great campaign being runner-up with 41 points and maintained a fourteen-game winning streak. Another important element was Marcos Aurelio, who highlighted with 16 goals. A match against Atlante was scheduled place in Mexico City on June 1, 1947, in the Estadio Insurgentes (now Estadio Ciudad de los Deportes) which took place in León, but had to switch venues due to an epidemic of foot-and-mouth disease afflicting the Bajío region

In a match against América on May 9, 1946, Florencio Caffaratti accidentally touched an electrical wire after scoring a goal. Alfonso Montemayor rescued him. Subsequently, Caffaratti gave a gold coin to Montemayor with the inscription: "In appreciation of Montemayor by F. Caffaratti."

=== 1947–48 ===
When José María Casullo coached Club León, the greens lost seven times, three of them against Atlas. The team tied at 36 points with the Jalisco Gold at first place. Jalisco Gold broke the tie with a score of 2–0.

=== 1948–49 ===
Club León defeated Asturias 2–0 with goals by Adalberto López to prevent a tie with Atlas and Guadalajara who remained a point, and Leon became the first to win the tournament campeonísimo cup after defeating Atlante 3–0 on August 14, 1949.

=== 1951–52 ===
Club León switched coaches to Antonio López Herranz. Antonio Carbajal joined the team with the return of Marcos Aurelio, Sergio Bravo, and Saturnino Martínez. The team played against a Guadalajara team coached by José María Casullo. León won both games of the year with scores of 1–0. In the penultimate round, León lost to Guadalajara by 1 point.

In the following season, the team remained in third place at 27 points. For the 1953–54, season it finished in eighth place with 21 points.

=== 1955–56 ===
The season's roster increased to 14 teams. León won the best streak in club history with 12 wins and 7 draws before losing against Tampico (1–0). The final game was played at the Estadio Olímpico in Mexico City, where León defeated Oro (4–2) and Toluca.

In 1956–57, León lost to Guadalajara. In 1957–58, they reached fifth place but won the Copa MX title.

=== 1960s ===
León remained in fifth place in the 1960–61 season with 26 points, fifth place in the 1961–62 season with 25 points, ninth place in the 1962–63 season with 25 points, ninth place in the 1963–64 season with 25 points, seventh place in the 1964–65 season with 30 points, ninth place in the 1965–66 season with 28 points, fifth place in the 1966–67 season with 34 points, fifth place in the 1967–68 season with 35 points, seventh place in the 1968–69 season with 31 points, and seventh place in the 1969–70 season with 31 points.

=== 1970s ===
For the Mexico 1970 World Cup, there were two technical changes: the starter Argentine Luis Grill was replaced, but was reinstated after Antonio Carbajal left, as a result, left with 33 points to fourth overall Sergio Anaya new stand becomes scorer the contest with 16 touchdowns, while Luis Estrada scored 13 goals. 1970–71 players arrive, Jorge Davino, Roberto Salomone and Juan José Valiente who scored ten goals, the club was led by Carbajal and ranked fourth with 38 points.

In 1972–73, Antonio Carbajal was replaced by Rafael Albrecht who served as player and coach. The final game was against Cruz Azul.

In 1973–74, the team failed to qualify at fifth place with 40 points.

=== First relegation ===
In 1986–87, Jorge Davino scored 10 points in 19 days and León was subsequently relegated to the Segunda División de México. However, they would reappear in the Primera División de México on May 10, 2012 and won the Apertura 2012 when they arrived back to the Primera División.

=== 1990s ===
The Esmeraldas returned to the Primera División for the 1990–91 season and were coached by Víctor Manuel Vucetich, who debuted in the top flight and led the entire tournament. He led the club in sixth place with 41 points, but did not qualify to be third in group 3, and Martin Uribe and Francisco Peña highlighted with 13 and 12 goals.

=== Second relegation ===
Robert Zermeño cost the team and landed them in last place with 19 points.

After the second relegation, the club was sold to Argentine businessman Carlos Ahumada.

On November 19, 2010, Grupo Pachuca purchased the club.

=== Return to Primera División ===
Argentine Gustavo Matosas began leading León on January 7, 2012, after being hired in September 2011. During the Apertura 2011 tournament, he could not have a presence off the bench or be registered as coach because he had coached Querétaro in the same tournament. Matosas' team received 10 wins, 4 draws, and 0 defeats in 14 regular season fixtures, resulted in an ERA of 70.83% and the overall leader, helping them earn a direct qualification to semi-finals of the play-offs. In the semi-finals, they faced Correcaminos UAT and won 1–0 in the second match before facing Lobos BUAP in the final, winning by an aggregate score of 7–3 and the right to play again in the Promotional Final. Facing the 2011 Apertura championship winners Correcaminos UAT, León won by an aggregate score of 6–2, thus returning to the Mexican top-flight for the 2012–13 season. León had struggled for their fourth final for promotion after losing against Irapuato in 2003, Dorados de Sinaloa in 2005, and Indios de Ciudad Juárez in 2008.

León won both tournaments (the Apertura and Clausura) of the 2013–14 season and became the first team in Mexico's history to win two consecutive championship titles twice — winning the first of these during the 1947–48 and 1948–49 leagues consecutively.

Matosas and León parted ways after failing to make it to the Apertura 2014 championship stage. Argentine Juan Antonio Pizzi was named as his replacement.

On January 31, 2016, following a 3–1 away loss to Tigres UANL, Pizzi left the charge to join Chile as their new manager and was subsequently replaced by Luis Fernando Tena. The club managed to reach the semi-final stage of the Clausura 2016 championship, losing out to sibling club and eventual winners Pachuca with an aggregate score of 3–2.

Following a lackluster beginning to the Apertura 2016 where León summed up 4 points within 7 league matches, Tena was let go and Argentine Javier Torrente was brought in. Regardless of the uninspiring start, the club managed to reach the Apertura 2016 championship stage, losing to eventual winners Tigres UANL in the semi-finals by an aggregate score of 3–1.

In August 2017, Torrente was let go after a year as manager and was replaced by Gustavo Díaz.

On September 18, 2018, Ignacio Ambríz was named manager of León, replacing Díaz. During the Clausura 2019 tournament, he helped León attain the records of most consecutive wins with eleven points, and the most points ever attained during the 17-match tournament format (41 points). They faced Tigres UANL in the Clausura 2019 championship final, but lost following an aggregate score of 1–0. Regardless, Ambríz's feats with the club contributed to him being named best manager at the conclusion of the season.

After a first place finish with 40 points in the Guardianes 2020 general table, on December 13, León won the league title defeating Club Universidad Nacional with an aggregate score of 3–1, becoming Mexico's joint fourth most successful team with eight titles in total alongside Cruz Azul.

After winning the 2023 CONCACAF Champions League, the club was initially qualified to the upcoming 2025 FIFA Club World Cup, for being one of the four winners of the CONCACAF Champions League between 2021 and 2024. However, on March 21, 2025, Club León was disqualified from the upcoming 2025 FIFA Club World Cup after FIFA ruled that the club had failed to meet tournament regulations on multi-club ownership regarding its connections to Grupo Pachuca, which also owns Pachuca, eventually being replaced by Los Angeles F.C.

== Stadium ==
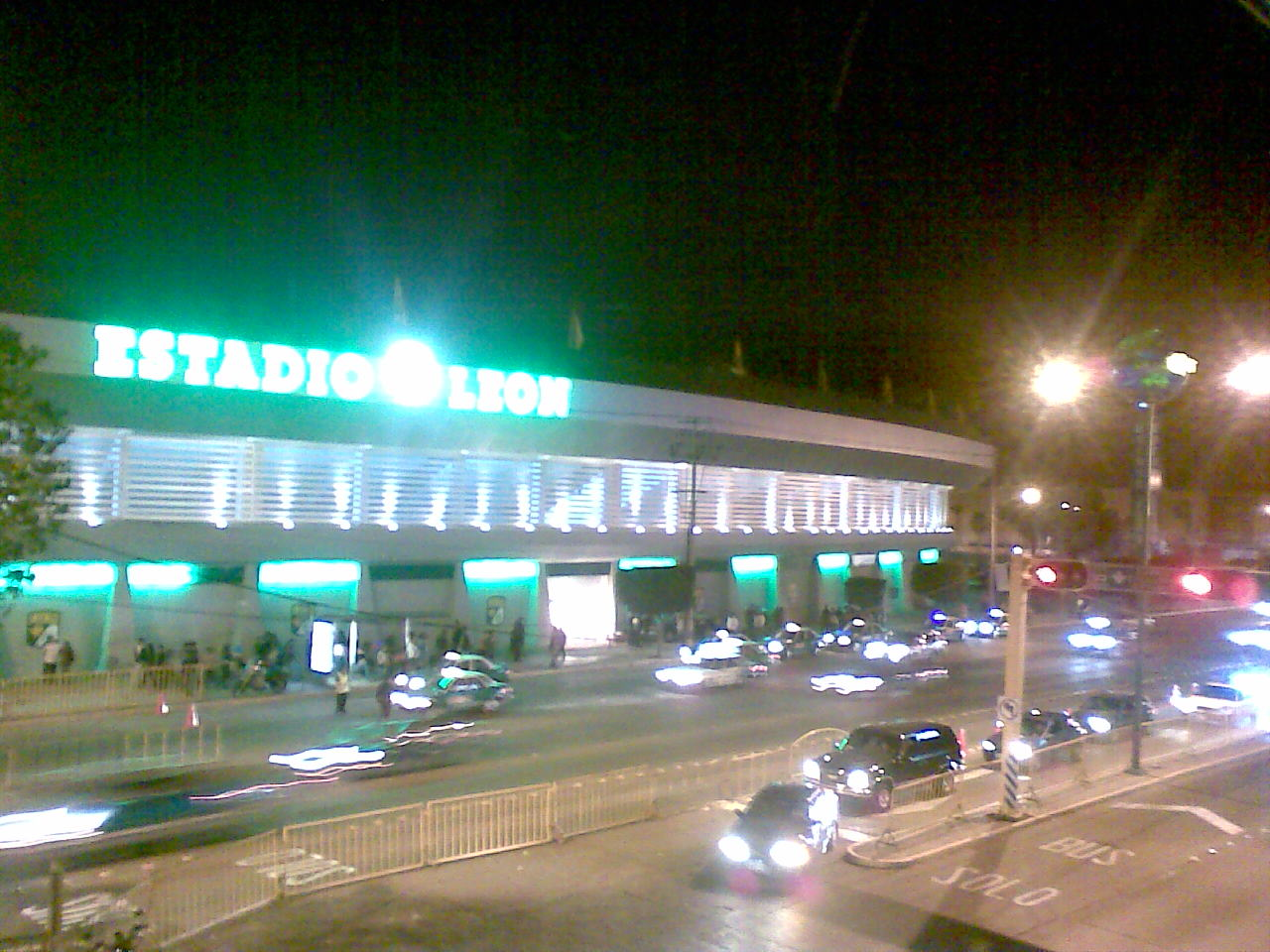
Night view of the León Stadium.

Estadio León (unofficially known as "Nou Camp") is a football stadium in León, Guanajuato, Mexico. The stadium is home to Club León. It is also used for special events.

The construction of the stadium commenced in August 1965 and was finalized by the end of 1966. On 1 February 1967, the stadium was inaugurated with a match between Santos and River Plate. Santos won the match 2–1.

The stadium has hosted two FIFA World Cups: the 1970 FIFA World Cup, when the stadium hosted the likes of West Germany, Peru, Bulgaria and Morocco, as well as the quarter-final between West Germany and England; and the 1986 FIFA World Cup, when the stadium hosted the Soviet Union, France, Hungary and Canada, as well as a second-round match between the USSR and Belgium.

After years of ownership disputes, in 2021, Grupo Pachuca purchased Estadio León with government financing.

== Rivalries ==
=== Unión de Curtidores ===
The oldest rivalry of Club León is against Unión de Curtidores, a rivalry which began as both clubs reside in the same city. Unión de Curtidores during its early years was the dominant team from León. However, when they joined the Liga Mayor in 1943, part of the franchise merged with Selección de Guanajuato and took the name of Unión-León, which was later renamed as Club León.

=== Irapuato ===
The club's biggest rivalry is against Irapuato, which is known as El Clásico del Bajío, it is also one of the biggest rivalries in the region of the Bajío. However, this rivalry is not current in Liga MX because Irapuato currently competes in the Liga Premier, the Mexico's third-level league. Their last confrontation in the Primera División was in the Invierno 2001 tournament, drawing 2–2.

=== Celaya ===
Another state rivalry of the club is against Atlético Celaya, however, this rivalry is also not current at the top level of Mexican football, because Celaya currently competes in the Liga Premier. Their last confrontation in Primera División was in the Verano 2002 tournament, drawing 1–1.

== Honours ==
Domestic
Type	Competition	Titles	Seasons	Runners-up
Top level FMF	Liga MX	8	1947–48, 1948–49, 1951–52, 1955–56, 1991–92, Ape–2013, Cla–2014, Guard–2020	1946–47, 1958–59, 1972–73, 1974–75, Inv–1997, Cla–2019, Ape–2021
Top level FMF	Copa MX	5	1948–49, 1957–58, 1966–67, 1970–71, 1971–72	1952–53, 1956–57, 1958–59, 1965–66, Ape–2015
Top level FMF	Campeón de Campeones	5	1948, 1949, 1956, 1971, 1972	1952, 1958, 1967, 2021
Lower levels FMF	Primera División A	4^{s}	Ver–2003, Cla–2004, Cla–2008, Cla–2012	Cla–2005, Cla–2007, Bic–2010
Lower levels FMF	Campeón de Ascenso	1	2012	2003, 2004, 2008
Lower levels FMF	Segunda División	1	1989–90	1987–88
International
Type	Competition	Titles	Seasons	Runners-up
Continental CONCACAF	CONCACAF Champions Cup	1	2023	1993
Regional North America USSF–FMF	Leagues Cup	1^{s}	2021	—

Notes

- record
- ^{s} shared record

== Personnel ==
=== Management ===
Position	Staff
President	(Mexico) Jesús Martínez Murguia
Director of football	(Mexico) Rodrigo Fernández
Director of academy	(Mexico) Javier Santamaría
Secretary	(Mexico) Ángel Meza

Source: Liga MX

As of 28 November 2022

=== Coaching staff ===
Position	Staff
Manager	(Argentina) Javier Gandolfi
Assistant managers	(Argentina) Santiago Raymonda
Assistant managers	(Argentina) Raúl Armando
Goalkeeper coach	(Mexico) Agustín Sandoval
Fitness coach	(Argentina) Walter Minella
Physiotherapist	(Mexico) Víctor Quezada
Team doctor	(Mexico) Valentín Villa

== Players ==
=== First-team squad ===
As of 22 September 2026

Note: Flags indicate national team as defined under FIFA eligibility rules; some limited exceptions apply. Players may hold more than one non-FIFA nationality.

No.	Pos.	Nation	Player
3	DF	COL	Juan Guevara
4	DF	MEX	Bryan Colula
5	DF	CHI	Sebastián Vegas (on loan from Monterrey)
6	MF	MEX	Fernando Beltrán
7	DF	MEX	Iván Moreno
8	MF	MEX	Juan Pablo Domínguez (on loan from Toluca)
11	FW	PAN	Ismael Díaz
12	GK	MEX	Julio González
13	MF	COL	Daniel Arcila
14	DF	COL	Jhohan Romaña
15	MF	MEX	Sebastián Fierro
16	MF	MEX	Jordi Cortizo
18	MF	COL	Edgar Guerra

No.	Pos.	Nation	Player
19	FW	MEX	Alfonso Alvarado
20	MF	CHI	Rodrigo Echeverría
21	FW	COL	Santiago Londoño (on loan from Pachuca)
23	GK	MEX	Óscar García
25	DF	MEX	Paul Bellón
26	DF	MEX	Salvador Reyes
27	FW	COL	Diber Cambindo
28	MF	MEX	David Ramírez
29	MF	MEX	José Iván Rodríguez
30	MF	MEX	Ángel Estrada
33	DF	MEX	Abraham Villegas (on loan from Guadalajara)
35	MF	MEX	Luis Valadez

=== Youth squad ===
Note: Flags indicate national team as defined under FIFA eligibility rules; some limited exceptions apply. Players may hold more than one non-FIFA nationality.

No.	Pos.	Nation	Player
181	GK	MEX	Irving Martínez
185	DF	MEX	Christopher Mora
199	MF	ARG	Santiago Colombatto

No.	Pos.	Nation	Player
203	MF	MEX	Jesús Lara
247	MF	MEX	Issac Espinosa

=== Other players under contract ===
Note: Flags indicate national team as defined under FIFA eligibility rules; some limited exceptions apply. Players may hold more than one non-FIFA nationality.

No.	Pos.	Nation	Player
—	DF	URU	Valentín Gauthier (injured)

=== Out on loan ===
Note: Flags indicate national team as defined under FIFA eligibility rules; some limited exceptions apply. Players may hold more than one non-FIFA nationality.

No.	Pos.	Nation	Player
—	GK	COL	Jordan García (at Atlante)
—	DF	ECU	Byron Castillo (at Barcelona de Guayaquil)
—	DF	MEX	Luis Cervantes (at Zacatecas)
—	MF	URU	Nicolás Fonseca (at Coritiba)
—	MF	URU	Alan Medina (at Everton)

No.	Pos.	Nation	Player
—	MF	MEX	Sebastián Santos (at Pachuca)
—	MF	MEX	Yael Uribe (at UAT)
—	FW	MEX	Ettson Ayón (at Juárez)
—	FW	ARG	Nicolás Vallejo (at Pachuca)

== Player records ==
=== Goalscorers ===
N°	Name	Season	LEAGUE	2ND DIV	CUP	CDC	CON	LIB	Total
1	(Mexico) Adalberto López	1946 - 50 (5)	126	-	9	1	-		136
2	(Argentina) (Mexico) Mauro Boselli	2013 - 18 (5)	105	-	20	-	1	4	130
3	(Argentina) (Mexico) Marcos Aurelio	1944 - 48/ 1951 - 56 (6)	98	-	10	-			108
4	(Argentina) Roberto Salomone	1971 - 77 (6)	95	-	9	-			104
5	(Mexico) Luis Estrada	1965 - 73 / 1978 - 79 (9)	90	-	11	1	-		102
6	(Brazil) Tita	1990 - 94/ 1995 - 97 (6)	88	-	2	-	7	-	97
7	(Argentina) Oswaldo Martinolli	1955 - 61 (5)	74	-	15	2	-	-	91
8	(Ecuador) Ángel Mena	2019 - 2024 (4)	67	-	2	-	7	-	76
9	(Mexico) Sergio Anaya	1966 - 72 (7)	53	-	7	-			60
10	(Argentina) Alberto Etcheverry	1958 - 61 (3)	37	-	20	-			57
11	(Mexico) Luis Montes	2011 - 2022 (11)	47	7	1	-		1	56
12	(Mexico) Luis Luna	1945 - 1962 (17)	47	-	6	-			53
13	(Mexico) Carlos Peña	2011 - 15 / 2017 (6)	38	6	5	-		3	52
14	(Argentina) Alberto Jorge	1976 - 80 (4)	51	-					51
15	(Argentina) Juan José Valiente	1970-1972 (2)	45	-					45
16	(Brazil) Cabinho	1983 - 85 (2)	44	-					44
17	(Mexico) Everaldo Begines	1997 - 00 (3)	43	-			1	-	44
18	(Argentina) Hector Carlos Álvarez	2005/2006-2007	-	44	-				44
19	(Mexico) **Elías Hernández**	2013 - 2018/2021 - Act. (5)	36	-	2	-	3	-	41
20	(Uruguay) Nelson Sebastián Maz	2011-2014	9	27	-			1	37
21	(Ghana) Isaac Ayipei	1992-1995 (3)	35	-			1	-	36
22	(Mexico) Luis Nieves	2006-2012 (6)	36	-				-	36
23	(Mexico) Sigifredo Mercado	1995 - 99 / 2000 - 01 / 2003 (6)	33	-	1	-	1	-	35
24	(Chile) Víctor Dávila	2020-2023	30	-			3	-	33
25	(Paraguay) Fredy Bareiro	2007-2008	-	30	-				30
26	(Mexico) Martín Peña	1990 - 92 / 1995 - 99 / 2001 (7)	26	-	1	-			27
27	(Mexico) Bardo Fierros	2004 - 2007	-	27	-				27
28	(Mexico) Mauricio Romero	2007 - 2008	-	26	-				26
29	(Mexico) Missael Espinoza	1997-1998 / 1999-2002 (4)	23	-					23

Notes

- Bold: Current players on the club.
- LEAGUE: First Division
- 2ND DIV: Second division leagues
- CUP: Copa México/Copa MX
- CDC: Campeon de Campeones Cup
- CON: CONCACAF Champions Cup
- LIB: Copa Libertadores

== Managers ==
- (Spain) Antonio López Herranz (1951–52), (1955–56), (1957–58)
- (Chile) Luis Grill Prieto (1966–67), (1970)
- (Mexico) Antonio Carbajal (1969–70), (1970–72)
- (Hungary) Árpád Fekete (1981)
- (Uruguay) Juan Ricardo Faccio (1982)
- (Hungary) Árpád Fekete (1983–85)
- (Chile) Pedro García Barros (1987–88)
- (Mexico) Víctor Manuel Vucetich (1989–1993)
- (Brazil) Sebastiao Lazaroni (1993–94)
- (Argentina) Roberto Saporiti (1994)
- (Uruguay) Carlos Miloc (1995–1996)
- (Mexico) José Luis Saldívar (1996)
- (Chile) Carlos Reinoso (1997)
- (Uruguay) Aníbal Ruiz (1997–98)
- (Mexico) Alberto Guerra (1998)
- (Mexico) Carlos Babington (September 1998 - December 1998)
- (Chile) Carlos Reinoso (1999–00)
- (Mexico) José Luis Saldívar (2000)
- (Mexico) Enrique López Zarza (March 27, 2001 – April 16, 2001)
- (Mexico) Carlos Babington (2001-2002)
- (Mexico) Efraín Flores (2002)
- (Argentina) Pablo Centrone (2002–03)
- (Chile) Carlos Reinoso (2003)
- (Mexico) José Luis Saldívar (2005)
- (Mexico) Sergio Bueno (January 1, 2007 – June 30, 2008)
- (Mexico) Mario García (July 1, 2008 – October 13, 2008)
- (Argentina) Luis Scatolaro (May 28, 2009 – June 4, 2009)
- (Mexico) Salvador Reyes (July 1, 2009 – October 24, 2009)
- (Mexico) José Luis Salgado (January 1, 2010 – July 24, 2010)
- (Mexico) Sergio Orduña (August 7, 2010 – August 22, 2010)
- (Brazil) Pintado (September 10, 2010 – December 31, 2010)
- (Brazil) Tita (January 1, 2011 – September 14, 2011)
- (Mexico) Pedro Muñoz (September 15, 2011 – December 31, 2011)
- (Uruguay) Gustavo Matosas (January 1, 2012 – November 24, 2014)
- (Spain) Juan Antonio Pizzi (November 24, 2014 – January 28, 2016)
- (Mexico) Luis Fernando Tena (February 2016 – August 2016)
- (Argentina) Javier Torrente (August 2016 – August 2017)
- (Uruguay) Gustavo Díaz (September 2017 – September 2018)
- (Mexico) Ignacio Ambríz (September 2018 – May 2021)
- (Argentina) Ariel Holan (May 2021 – April 2022)
- (Portugal) Renato Paiva (May 2022 – November 2022)
- (Argentina) Nicolás Larcamón (November 2022 – December 2023)
- (Uruguay) Jorge Bava (December 2023 – September 2024)
- (Argentina) Eduardo Berizzo (September 2024 – September 2025)
- (Mexico) Ignacio Ambríz (September 2025 – March 2026)
- (Argentina) Javier Gandolfi (March 2026 – Present)

== Reserves ==
=== Cachorros de León ===
The team competes in the Group XII of the Liga TDP, and also participated in the Liga de Nuevos Talentos of the Segunda División, finishing as champions in the Revolución 2011 tournament, defeating Alacranes "B" 3–0 on aggregate. It also won the Campeón de Campeones de la Liga de Nuevos Talentos in 2011, defeating Cachorros UANL 6–3 on aggregate.

=== León GEN ===
The team is based in Lagos de Moreno, Jalisco, and competes in the Group XII of the Liga TDP.

=== León Premier ===
From 2015 to 2018, the team participated in the Torneo de Filiales de la Liga Premier.
