= 1907 in association football =

The following are the football (soccer) events of the year 1907 throughout the world.

== Winners club national championship ==
- England: For fuller coverage, see 1906-07 in English football.
  - Football League First Division – Newcastle United
  - Football League Second Division – Nottingham Forest
  - English FA Cup – Sheffield Wednesday
- Italy: A.C. Milan
- Greece: Ethnikos G.S. Athens
- Paraguay: Club Guaraní
- Scotland: For fuller coverage, see 1906–07 in Scottish football.
  - Scottish Division One – Celtic
  - Scottish Division Two – St Bernard's
  - Scottish Cup – Celtic

== International tournaments ==
- 1907 British Home Championship (March 16 – April 6, 1907)

Wales

== Clubs founded ==
- Atalanta
- Como
- Venezia
- HJK Helsinki
- Rot-Weiss Essen
- FC Augsburg
- SSV Jahn Regensburg
- Rochdale A.F.C.
- SC Paderborn
- Fenerbahçe S.K.

== Births ==
- January 4 – Willy Busch, German footballer (died 1982)
- November 21 – Ernesto Mascheroni, Uruguayan footballer (died 1984)
- December 6 – Giovanni Ferrari, Italian footballer (died 1982)
- December 10 – Lucien Laurent, French footballer (died 2005)

== Deaths ==
- February 26 – C. W. Alcock, English centre forward and creator of the FA Cup. Organiser of the England v Scotland representative football matches (1870–72). (64)
