= C.F. San Sebastián de León =

Mexican football club

San Sebastián
- Full name: Club de Futbol San Sebastián de León
- Nicknames: Santos (Saints)
- Founded: 1945
- Dissolved: 1959
Home colours	Away colours

Club de Futbol San Sebastián de León was a Mexican football team. The club was founded in 1945. San Sebastián is one among many club out of the state of Guanajuato that have played in the Primera División de México.

== History ==
San Sebastián was founded in 1945 and took its name from the city where they play out León. The club played its first official game on August 19, 1945, in the league tournament which they lost 1–0 to Monterrey. The club did not fare well in its first year, in the 19 round, for example, San Sebastián was defeated 9–2 by Atlante.

From 1945 to 1951 the club played in the Primera División de México. In 5 tournament the club did not managed to finish better than 6th place. The club was relegated in 1951 under the management of Marcos Aurelio. San Sebastián go down in history as the first Mexican club to ever be relegated.

The club played a few more years in the Segunda División de México from 1952 to 1959, but it would not ever play in the top division. San Sebastián came close to promotion in 1952, when they finished runner-up to La Piedad, and once again in 1954 when they again fell short, this time to Irapuato. Due to the poor play and lack of supporters the club was disbanded in 1959.

== See also ==
- Primera División de México
- Segunda División de México
- Irapuato FC
- León
