= Parque Asturias =

Multi-use stadium in Mexico City, Mexico

Coordinates: 19°24′27″N 99°07′57″W

- Interactive map of Parque Asturias
- Full name: Parque Asturias
- Location: Mexico City, Mexico
- Owner: Asturias F.C.
- Operator: Asturias F.C.
- Capacity: 25,000

Construction
- Opened: 1936
- Closed: 1966

Tenants
- Asturias F.C. Atlante F.C.

Parque Asturias was a multi-use stadium in Mexico City, Mexico. It was initially used as the stadium of Asturias F.C. and Atlante F.C. matches. It was replaced by Estadio Azteca in 1966. The capacity of the stadium was 25,000 spectators.

== History ==
On March 1, 1936, being president José Díaz Bernardo, opened Parque Asturias with a match between Asturias and Botafogo Brazil. This stadium, with its capacity of 25,000 spectators, marked a new era for sport in Mexico. It was built in what is now called Apricot Causeway. The Park Asturias was a sports complex which had three football fields, six tennis and volleyball courts, three wooden stave and three tarmac, Olympic pool and diving pit four bowling alleys, twelve table tennis (10 clay and 2 synthetic), six gables, four squash courts, three gymnasiums, three basketball courts, three restaurants, table bowling, cinema- halls and extensive landscaping . He celebrated several holidays a year, including those known as Pilgrimage of Covadonga, in September, the Member ( the largest), in October and in April the Asturian Jira . The March 29, 1939, in a very important between Necaxa and Local Asturias, the wooden bleachers of the property were burned by fans necaxistas because they claimed an error arbitration against Atletico, the flames spread, leaving the stadium reduced to ashes.

The site of the stadium was vacant for many years, and later used for the Comercial Mexicana Asturias store, one of the first of the supermarket chain. In 2018 it was renamed as Soriana. It is located between Chabacano avenus and Jose Antonio Torres street, in the Asturias neighborhood.

== Fire in The "Parque Asturias" ==
The March 26, 1939, there occurred a tragedy that would be the beginning of the end of the wooden stage . They played the Asturias and Necaxa vying for the first place that would take them to win the state championship . The Necaxa needed to win to tie the Asturias, or left without title aspirations . The referee in that game was Ferdinand Marcos. The party waited with bated breath, before meeting fans of both teams were locked in lawsuits and insults. The stadium was completely full, the table of Necaxa played the idol of the Mexican fans Horacio Casarín . It was a decisive match, became a tough game with many strong entries, before the match Carlos Laviada fouled Horacio knee hitting Casarín the most dangerous player necaxistas, Casarín was marked with the slogan seriously stop it any cost, but this did not stop Casarín scored the first goal for Necaxa, minutes later, Leon II Casarín hit him again, and after 20 minutes defender Juan Soto cunning kicked Casarín 's knee, rendering the Party incapable to follow in the event. This angered fans who began to light fires in the stands of sun. The Asturias to leveling but shortly after Necaxa score again in the final minutes Ferdinand Marcos referee awards a penalty to the Asturias, tying the game at two goals, the penalty was fair but angry fans began to turn lights on wooden grandstands . The fire quickly it spread reaching the clock and the score was engulfed in flames and that read the tie with two goals that left out of the title to Necaxa . The sun stands were entirely consumed almost instantly . The arrival of the fire was useless there was no water in the pumps and isolate were implemented shadow stands for the park does not fully catch fire . An hour later, the place was turned into rubble, wood and joists smoldering ashes everywhere, an occasional call announcing his victory over what was once the largest park Mexico Soccer . There you have to remember, that March 26, 1939, as the day gave beginning to the end of the wooden stage, this fire was the perfect excuse for the Mexican capital decided to remove the wooden stage . And for the decade of the 40 's, the Necaxa started having a run of bad results that season came to reinforce Spanish players to other teams and so the tournament was difficult and red and white glory began to collapse . Another factor that weakened the squad was that they started selling important players were talented in 1942 Horacio Casarín is sold to their archrivals, the Atlantean, causing anger among the fans.

== Local Teams ==
Parque Asturias It was home from 1936 until the beginning of the decade of the 1940s of the biggest teams in the Mexican league soccer, teams legendary as Asturias, Atlante, Necaxa and eventually the "Club Spain".
