= Parque Deportivo Veracruzano =

Multi-use stadium in Veracruz, Mexico

- Interactive map of Parque Deportivo Veracruzano
- Full name: Parque Deportivo Veracruzano
- Location: Veracruz, Mexico
- Coordinates: 19.170111°N 96.125664°W
- Owner: Rojos del Águila de Veracruz; Tiburones Rojos de Veracruz
- Operator: Rojos del Águila de Veracruz; Tiburones Rojos de Veracruz
- Capacity: 12,000

Construction
- Opened: 1957
- Closed: 2006

Tenants
- Rojos del Águila de Veracruz; Tiburones Rojos de Veracruz

Parque Deportivo Veracruzano was a multi-use stadium in Veracruz, Mexico. It was initially used as the stadium of Rojos del Águila de Veracruz and Tiburones Rojos de Veracruz matches. It was replaced by Estadio Universitario Beto Ávila in 2006 for Rojos del Águila de Veracruz and Estadio Luis de la Fuente in 1967 for the Tiburones Rojos de Veracruz . The capacity of the stadium was 12,000 spectators.
