= Estadio Felipe Martínez Sandoval =

- Interactive map of Estadio Felipe Martínez Sandoval
- Full name: Estadio Felipe Martínez Sandoval
- Location: Guadalajara, Mexico
- Coordinates: 20.66834°N 103.327832°W
- Owner: CD Oro
- Operator: CD Oro
- Capacity: 10,000

Construction
- Opened: 1930
- Closed: 1960's

Tenant
- Oro

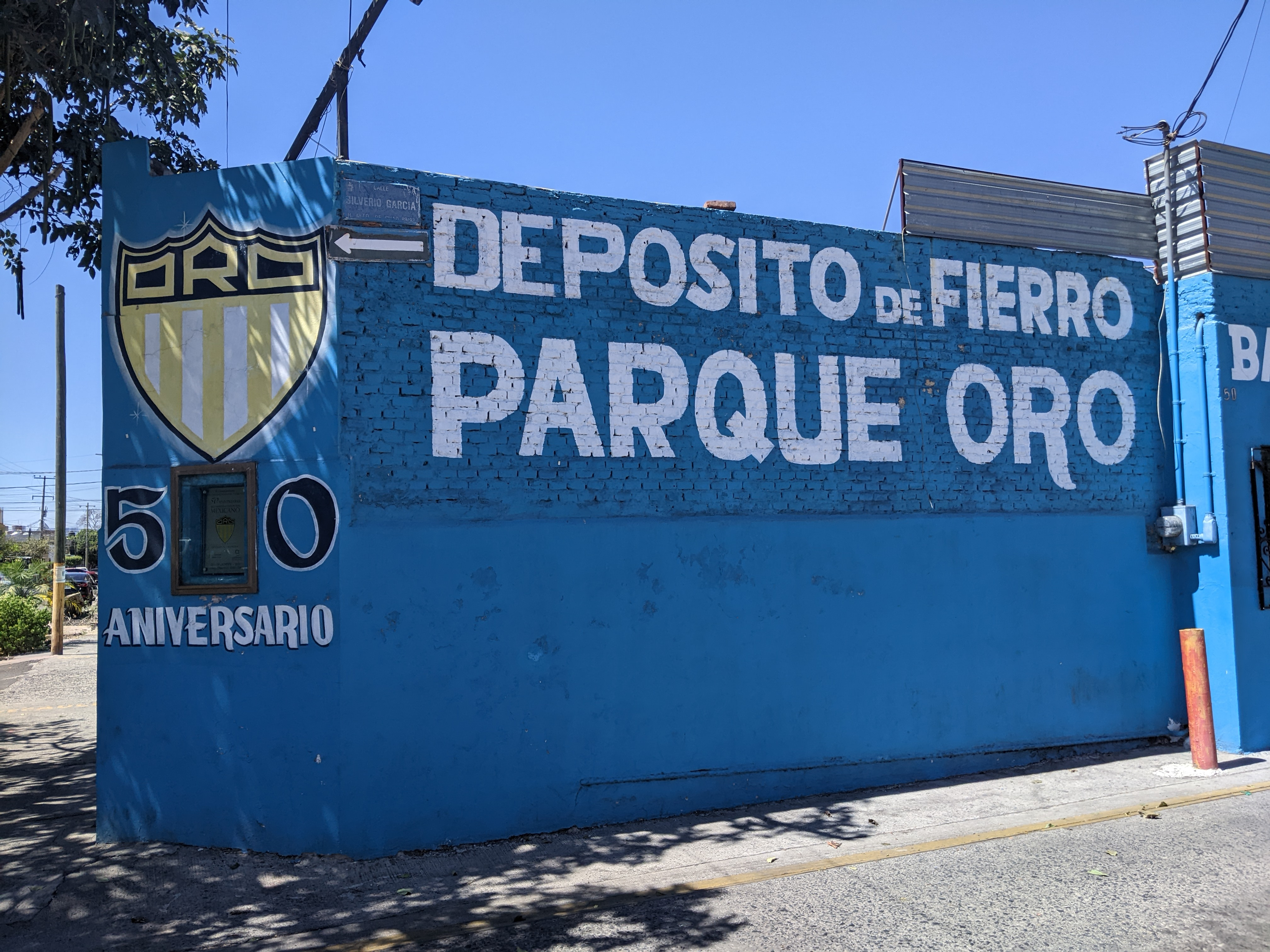
Commemorative display for the former stadium, Parque Oro.

Estadio Felipe Martínez Sandoval was a multi-use stadium in Guadalajara, Mexico, that was also known as Parque Oro. It was initially used as the stadium of CD Oro matches. It was replaced by Estadio Jalisco in 1960. The capacity of the stadium was 10,000 spectators.
