= Sabás Ponce =

Mexican footballer (1938–2021)

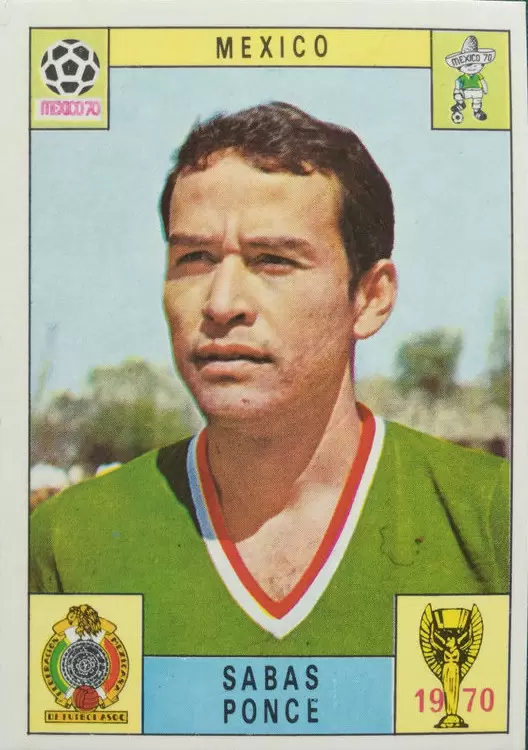

Personal information
- Full name: Sabás Ponce Labastida
- Date of birth: 13 January 1938
- Place of birth: Guadalajara, Jalisco, Mexico
- Date of death: 4 October 2021 (aged 74)
- Place of death: Mexico
- Position: Attacking midfielder

Youth career
- 195?–1955: Guadalajara

Senior career*
| Years | Team | Apps | (Gls) |
| 1956–1973 | Guadalajara | 307 | (51) |

International career
| 1960–1969 | Mexico | 2 | (0) |
- * Club domestic league appearances and goals

Sabás Ponce Labastida (13 January 1938 – 4 October 2021) was a Mexican footballer who played as a midfielder.

A one-club man, Ponce spent his whole career with Guadalajara and, together with José Villegas, stands as co-holder of the record for the most league titles in Mexican football.

== Club career ==
Ponce was born on 13 January 1938 in Guadalajara. He began his career within the Liga Intereparroquial of Jalisco for the youth sector of Guadalajara where his performance impressed the higher ups. At the age of 15, he was admitted into the reserve ranks of the club as he gained brief experience in the Mexican Primera División. Later on, at 17 years of age, he made his senior debut for Chivas with his inaugural 1956–57 Mexican Primera División as well as that season's Campeón de Campeones alongside other players such as Salvador Reyes, Guillermo Sepúlveda, Héctor Hernández and Crescencio Gutiérrez and José Villegas.

Throughout his career, he won seven editions of the Liga MX, six Campeón de Campeones, the 1969–70 Copa México and the 1962 CONCACAF Champions' Cup as he significantly contributed to the club's success throughout the 1960s. Ponce was often one of the top goal scorers and his offensive plays made him an essential player for Chivas. He served as a leading figure in training, his control of the midfield with a serious personality with great discipline. He retired following the 1972–73 season.

== International career ==
Ponce represented Mexico throughout the 1960s as well as appearing in preliminary rosters for the Mexican squad for the 1970 FIFA World Cup however he wouldn't make the final roster.

== Personal life ==
Ponce later married Martha Guadalupe and is the father of six children as well as the grandfather of five grandchildren.

He died 4 October 2021 following a long battle with an unspecified illness.

== Honours ==
Guadalajara

- Primera División de México: 1956–57, 1958–59, 1959–60, 1960–61, 1961–62, 1963–64, 1964–65, 1969–70
- Copa México: 1962–63, 1969–70
- Campeón de Campeones: 1957, 1959, 1960, 1961, 1964, 1965, 1970
- CONCACAF Champions League: 1962
