= 1959 Campeón de Campeones =

| Guadalajara | Zacatepec |
| 2 | 1 |
- Date: 3 May 1959
- Venue: Estadio Olímpico de la Ciudad de los Deportes, Mexico D.F.
- Referee: Manuel Alonso
- Attendance: 50,000

The 1959 Campeón de Campeones was the 18th edition of the Campeón de Campeones, an annual football super cup match. (Note: The edition number was calculated based on figures provided by Goal.com, with the first Campeón de Campeones having been held in 1941–42.) The match was played at Estadio Olímpico de la Ciudad de los Deportes on 3 May 1959 between the 1958–59 Mexican Primera División winners Guadalajara and 1958–59 Copa México winners Zacatepec.

== Match details ==
3 May 1959

| Guadalajara | 2–1 | Zacatepec |
|---|---|---|
| Reyes 71'; Ponce 75' | | Lara 31' |

Estadio Olímpico de la Ciudad de los Deportes, Mexico D.F.
Attendance: 50,000
Referee: Manuel Alonso

Guadalajara:
| Jaime Gómez |
| Pedro Nuño |
| Narciso López |
| Salvador Lima |
| Juan Jasso |
| José Cázares |
| Agustín Moreno |
| Salvador Reyes Monteón |
| Crescencio Gutiérrez |
| Jesús Ponce |
| Raúl Arellano |
| Sabás Ponce | Substituted on |
Manager:
(Hungary) Árpád Fekete

Zacatepec:
| Festa |
| Izaguirre |
| Ortiz |
| Vela |
| Cárdenas |
| Hernández |
| Vergara |
| Jasso |
| Carlos Lara |
| Coruco |
| Quintanar |
Manager:

Campeón de Campeones
1959 Winners
Guadalajara
Second Title
