= 1989 Campeón de Campeones =

América	Toluca
2	1
- Date: 20 July 1989
- Venue: Estadio Azteca, Mexico City
- Referee: Bonifacio Núñez
- Attendance: 60,000

The 1989 Campeón de Campeones was the 36th edition of the Campeón de Campeones, an annual football super cup match. (Note: The edition number was calculated based on figures provided by Goal.com, with the first Campeón de Campeones having been held in 1941–42.) The match-up featured Club América, the winners of the 1988–89 Mexican Primera División, and Toluca, the winners of the 1988–89 Copa México. It was played at the Estadio Azteca, Mexico City, on 20 July 1989.

The match went to extra time, where América secured a 2–1 victory, successfully defending their title as the previous champions and claiming their fourth Campeón de Campeones title.

== Match details ==
20 July 1989

América	2–1	Toluca
Hermosillo 23'; Seixas 92'	Report	Masciarelli 63'

Estadio Azteca, México DF
Attendance: 60,000
Referee: Bonifacio Núñez

Club América	Toluca
