= 1945 Campeón de Campeones =

Real España	Puebla
3	0
- Date: 1 July 1945
- Venue: Parque Asturias, Mexico D.F.
- Referee: Vicente Rubio

The 1945 Campeón de Campeones was the fourth edition of the Campeón de Campeones, an annual football super cup match. (Note: The edition number was calculated based on figures provided by Goal.com, with the first Campeón de Campeones having been held in 1941–42.) The match was played at Parque Asturias on 1 July 1945 between the 194–45 Mexican Primera División winners Real España and the 1944–45 Copa México winners Puebla.

== Match details ==
1 July 1945

Real España	3–0	Puebla
Quesada 12'; Fernández 36'; Tuñas 64'	Report

Parque Asturias, Mexico D.F.
Referee: Vicente Rubio

Real Club España	Puebla

Real España:
Juan Ayra
Leonardo Cilaurren
Carlos Laviada
Manuel Gil Fernández “Cubanaleco”
García
José Antonio Rodríguez
Jorge Quezada
José Iraragorri
Isidro Lángara
Juan Tuñas
Carlos Septién
Manager:
(Costa Rica) Rodolfo Muñoz “Busch”

Puebla:
José Iborra
Sabino Aguirre
Juan Ángel “Pito” Pérez
Mario Zendejas
Bruno Rodolfi
Filiberto Guerrero
Miguel López
Eladio Vaschetto
Arturo Chávez
Ricardo Alarcón
Guadalupe Velázquez
Manager:
(Spain) Eduardo Morilla

Campeón de Campeones
1945 Winners
Real España
Second Title
