= 1975 Campeón de Campeones =

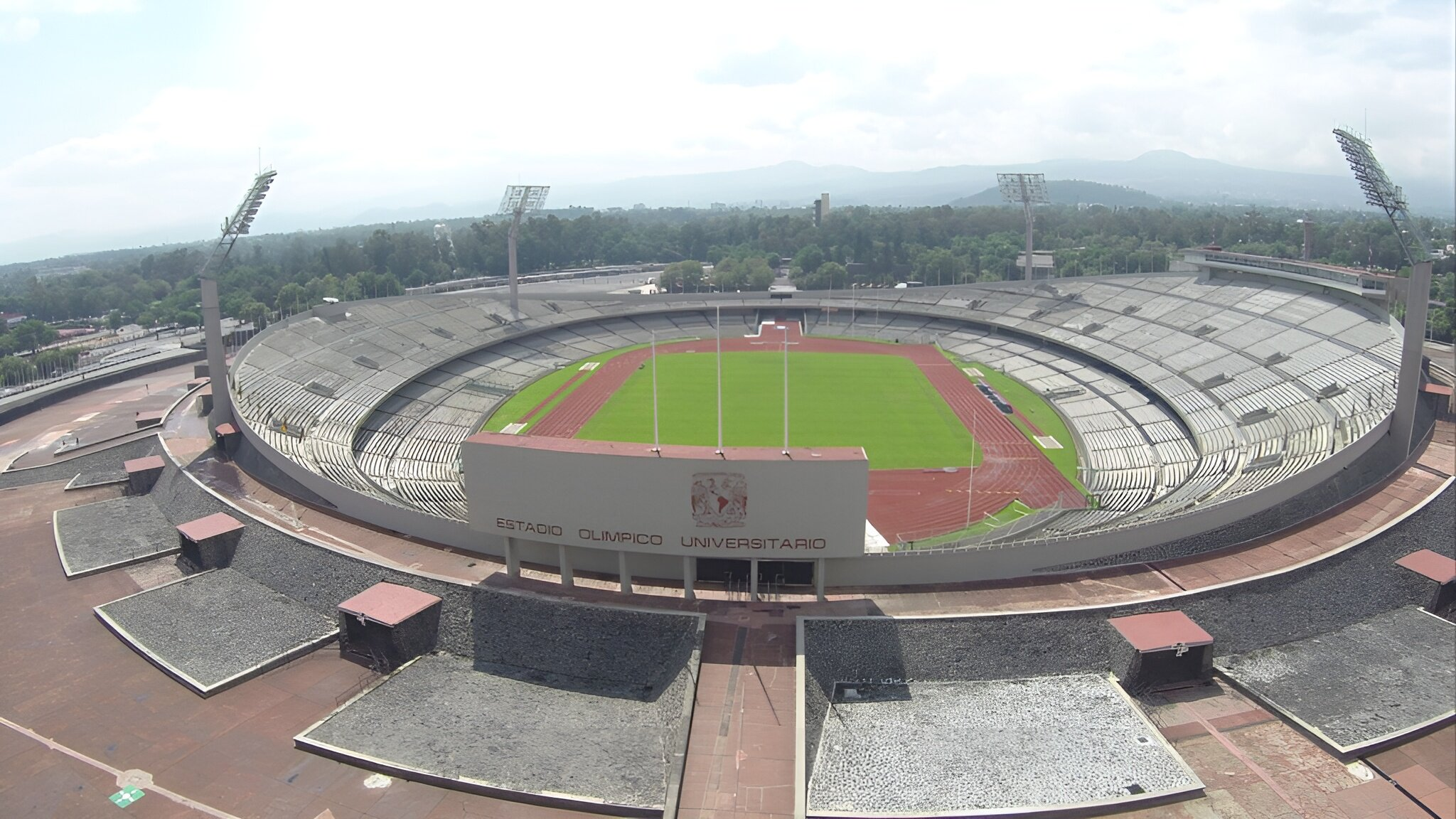
- Estadio Olímpico Universitario in Mexico City hosted the match.
Toluca	Pumas
0	1
- Date: 27 July 1975
- Venue: Estadio Olímpico Universitario, Mexico City

The 1975 Campeón de Campeones was the 33rd edition of the Campeón de Campeones, an annual football super cup match. (Note: The edition number was calculated based on figures provided by Goal.com, with the first Campeón de Campeones having been held in 1941–42.) The match-up featured Toluca, the winners of the 1974–75 Mexican Primera División, and Pumas, the winners of the 1974–75 Copa México. It was played at Estadio Olímpico Universitario, Mexico City, on 27 August 1975.

Pumas won the match 1–0 to secure their first Campeón de Campeones title.

== Teams ==
Team	Qualification	Previous participations (bold indicates winners)
Toluca	Winners of the 1974–75 Mexican Primera División	3 (1956, **1967**, **1968**)
Pumas	Winners of the 1974–75 Copa México	None

== Match ==
=== Details ===
The Mexican Primera División winners were designated as the "home" team for administrative purposes.

27 July 1975
12:00 CDT

Toluca	0–1	Pumas
	Report	Cuéllar 65'

Estadio Olímpico Universitario, Mexico City
Referee: Enrique Mendoza Guillén (Mexico City)
