= Salvador Reyes (footballer, born 1936) =

Mexican footballer (1936–2012)

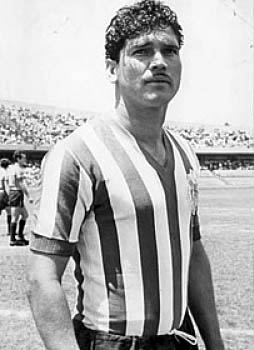
- Reyes with Chivas de Guadalajara

Personal information
- Full name: Salvador Reyes Monteón
- Date of birth: September 20, 1936
- Place of birth: Guadalajara, Jalisco, Mexico
- Date of death: December 29, 2012 (aged 76)
- Place of death: Guadalajara, Jalisco, Mexico
- Height: 1.73 m (5 ft 8 in)
- Position: Forward

Senior career*
| Years | Team | Apps | (Gls) |
| 1953–1967 | Guadalajara | 282 | (122) |
| 1967–1968 | Los Angeles Toros | 11 | (6) |
| 1968–1969 | Laguna F.C. | | |
| 1969–1972 | San Luis | | |
| 2008 | Guadalajara | 1 | (0) |

International career
| 1956–1966 | Mexico | 49 | (14) |

Managerial career
- 1969–1971: San Luis
- 1971–1972: Atleticos Campesinos
- 1972–1973: Tigres UANL
- 1973–1974: Cuerudos de Victoria
- 1986–1988: Serranos de Teziutlán
- * Club domestic league appearances and goals

Salvador Reyes Monteón (September 20, 1936 – December 29, 2012) was a Mexican professional footballer who played as a forward.

Reyes spent the bulk of his career with Guadalajara, where he became the club’s all-time leading scorer, a record that stood for more than four decades. A figure of the Campeonísimo era, he was part of securing Guadalajara’s first seven Primera División titles. He is also the all-time leading scorer in both the Clásico Nacional and the Clásico Tapatío. At 71, Reyes returned to Mexico’s top flight, becoming the oldest player ever to appear in the league.

At the international level, he represented Mexico at the FIFA World Cup in 1958, 1962 and 1966.

== Biography ==
Reyes was born on September 20, 1936, in Guadalajara, Jalisco, into a footballing family. His father, Luis Reyes, had played for Chivas, and young Salvador grew up deeply connected to the club, even serving as a ball boy before entering its youth system. In 1953, at just 16 years old, he made his first-team debut for Guadalajara in a match against León, becoming the youngest player to represent the club in the national league.

Reyes quickly established himself as a prolific striker. He scored his first goal that same year and went on to amass 122 league goals, a club record that stood for more than four decades. His goals often proved decisive: in 1957, he netted the winner against Irapuato that secured Chivas’ first league title, igniting the golden era of the Campeonísimo. Between 1957 and 1965, he helped the team capture seven league championships, claimed the top scorer title in 1961–62 season, and became Chivas’ most lethal scorer in Clásicos against Club América, with 14 goals. He also delivered a memorable hat-trick in the 1962 CONCACAF Champions' Cup final, securing Chivas’ first international trophy.

On the international stage, Reyes represented Mexico in three World Cups: 1958, 1962, and 1966.

On January 19, 2008, at the age of 71, he took the field for the opening minute of a league match against UNAM in a moving tribute, becoming the oldest player ever to appear in Mexico's top division. Chivas later retired his iconic number 8 jersey and named their stadium press box in his honor.

=== International goals ===
| No. | Date | Venue | Opponent | Score | Result | Competition | Ref. |
|---|---|---|---|---|---|---|---|
| 1. | April 4, 1957 | Mexico City, Mexico | United States | 3–0 | Win | 1958 FIFA World Cup qualification | |
| 2. | May 24, 1959 | Mexico City, Mexico | England | 2–1 | Win | Friendly | |
| 3. | November 6, 1960 | Chicago, United States | United States | 3–3 | Draw | 1962 FIFA World Cup qualification | |
| 4. | November 13, 1960 | Mexico City, Mexico | United States | 3–0 | Win | 1962 FIFA World Cup qualification | |
| 5. | April 5, 1961 | Mexico City, Mexico | Netherlands Antilles | 7–0 | Win | 1962 FIFA World Cup qualification | |
| 6. | April 29, 1961 | Ostrava, Czechoslovakia | Czechoslovakia | 1–2 | Loss | Friendly | |
| 7. | October 29, 1961 | Mexico City, Mexico | Paraguay | 1–0 | Win | 1962 FIFA World Cup qualification | |
| 8. | April 25, 1962 | Mexico City, Mexico | Colombia | 1–0 | Win | Friendly | |
| 9. | March 4, 1965 | Mexico City, Mexico | Honduras | 3–0 | Win | Friendly | |
| 10. | March 7, 1965 | Los Angeles, United States | United States | 2–2 | Draw | 1966 FIFA World Cup qualification | |

== Honours ==
Guadalajara

- Primera División de México: 1956–57, 1958–59, 1959–60, 1960–61, 1961–62, 1963–64, 1964–65
- Copa México: 1962–63
- Campeón de Campeones: 1957, 1959, 1960, 1961, 1964, 1965
- CONCACAF Champions League: 1962

Individual

- IFFHS All-Time Mexico Men's Dream Team
