= 2006 Campeón de Campeones =

Toluca	Pachuca
2	0
- on aggregate

First leg
Toluca	Pachuca
1	0
- Date: 23 July 2006
- Venue: Estadio Nemesio Díez, Toluca

Second leg
Pachuca	Toluca
0	1
- Date: 30 July 2006
- Venue: Estadio Hidalgo, Pachuca
- Referee: Roberto García

The 2006 Campeón de Campeones was the 42nd edition of the Campeón de Campeones, an annual football super cup match. (Note: The edition number was calculated based on figures provided by Goal.com, with the first Campeón de Campeones having been held in 1941–42.) The match-up featured Toluca, the winners of the Apertura 2005 and Pachuca, the winners of the Clausura 2006. It was staged over two legs. The first-leg was played on 23 July 2006 at Estadio Nemesio Díez, Toluca and the second-leg on 30 July 2006 at Estadio Hidalgo, Pachuca.

Tolcua won the series 2–0 on aggregate, claiming their fourth Campeón de Campeones title.

== Match details ==
23 July 2006

Toluca	1–0	Pachuca
Marioni 16'	Report

Estadio Nemesio Díez, Toluca
30 July 2006

Pachuca	0–1	Toluca
	Report	Marioni 48'

Estadio Hidalgo, Pachuca
Referee: Roberto García

Campeon de Campeones 2006 Winners
Toluca
4th Title
