= Carlos Alberto Seixas =

Brazilian footballer

Seixas
Personal information
- Full name: Carlos Alberto Seixas
- Date of birth: 15 December 1959 (age 66)
- Place of birth: São Paulo, Brazil
- Height: 1.75 m (5 ft 9 in)
- Position: Forward

Youth career
- Palmeiras

Senior career*
Years	Team	Apps	(Gls)
1979–1983	Palmeiras	112	(29)
1982	→ Santo André (loan)		
1982	→ Inter de Limeira (loan)	12	(0)
1983–1986	Cruzeiro	116	(52)
1985	→ Bahia (loan)		
1986	CRB		
1987	Goiás		
1987–1988	Mogi Mirim		
1988–1989	América (MEX)		
1989–1990	Atlante		
1990–1991	Alianza		
1991–1992	Querétaro		
1992–1993	CD FAS		
1993	Querétaro		
1994	Sãocarlense		
1994–1995	Venados de Yucatán		

Managerial career
- 1999: Mauaense
- 2002: Olímpia
- 2007: Santacruzense
- 2007: Primavera
- 2008: Inter de Limeira
- 2011: Santacruzense
- 2013: Noroeste
- 2015: Assisense
- 2016: Santacruzense
- 2017: Taquaritinga
- 2021: VOCEM
- 2022: Santacruzense
- 2023–2024: Independente (coordinator)
- * Club domestic league appearances and goals as of 24 March 2024

Carlos Alberto Seixas (born 15 December 1959) is a Brazilian former professional footballer and manager, who played as a forward.

== Career ==
Revealed in Palmeiras youth sectors, Carlos Alberto Seixas played for the club from 1979 to 1982, making 112 appearances and scoring 29 goals. His best moment, however, was with Cruzeiro EC, where he was state champion and top scorer in 1984. He also had notable spells with teams in Mexico and El Salvador.

== Managerial career ==
Seixas coached several teams in the countryside of São Paulo, with emphasis on Santacruzense and Inter de Limeira. His last job was as football coordinator at Independente de Limeira.

== Personal life ==
His son, Cacá (Carlos Alberto Campbell Seixas), was also a professional footballer with spells at Noroeste and Bragantino.

== Honours ==
Cruzeiro

- Campeonato Mineiro: 1984

América

- Mexican Primera División: 1988–89
- Campeón de Campeones: 1989

Individual

- 1984 Campeonato Mineiro top scorer: 14 goals
