= 1955 Campeón de Campeones =

Zacatepec	América
2	3
- Date: 10 March 1955
- Venue: Estadio Olímpico de la Ciudad de los Deportes, Mexico City
- Referee: Crawford
- Attendance: 30,000

The 1955 Campeón de Campeones was the 14th edition of the Campeón de Campeones, an annual football super cup match. (Note: The edition number was calculated based on figures provided by Goal.com, with the first Campeón de Campeones having been held in 1941–42.) The match was played at Estadio Olímpico de la Ciudad de los Deportes on 10 March 1955 between the 1954–55 Mexican Primera División winners Zacatepec and the 1954–55 Copa México winners América.

== Match details ==
10 March 1955
21:00

Zacatepec	2–3	América
Arnauda 70'; Candia 90'	Report	Nájera 63'; Cañibe 77', 81'

Olímpico de la Ciudad de los Deportes, Mexico D.F.
Attendance: 30,000
Referee: Crawford

Campeón de Campeones
1955 Winners
América
First Title
