= Carlos Lara =

Argentine-born Mexican footballer and coach (1934–2001)

Personal information
- Full name: Carlos Armando Lara Torres
- Date of birth: July 27, 1934
- Place of birth: Bahía Blanca, Argentina
- Date of death: May 20, 2001 (aged 66)
- Place of death: Mexico City
- Position: Striker

Senior career*
Years	Team	Apps	(Gls)
1953–1955	Ferro	40	(18)
1956	River Plate	4	(3)
1956–1966	Zacatepec		(120)
1966–1967	Toluca		(6)
1967–1969	Necaxa		(5)

International career
1961–1962	Mexico	4	(0)

Managerial career
- 1972–1975: Zacatepec
- 1975: Laguna
- 1978–1979: Veracruz
- 1983–1984: Oaxtepec
- 1984–1985: Santos Laguna
- * Club domestic league appearances and goals

Carlos Armando Lara Torres , also known as El Charro, was an Argentine-born naturalized-Mexican citizen footballer and coach. Born in 1934 in Argentina, Lara died in Mexico City in 2001.

== Club career ==
Born in Argentina, Lara began his football career with Ferro and River Plate. In 1956, he moved to Mexico where he played for Zacatepec, scoring 112 goals and being the top league scorer three times, two of which were consecutive. Lara began to decline in his later years, only achieving eight goals in the 1964–65 season.

He was then sold to Toluca, where he only scored six goals the entire season, then to Necaxa where he scored five in two seasons.

== International career ==
As a naturalized Mexican, he was eligible to play on the Selección de fútbol de México (Mexico national team). Lara debuted on 19 October 1961 in the 1962 World Cup qualifying round, participating in two games against Paraguay national team. He would play two more friendlies in 1962 against Argentina and Colombia, but was unable to travel to the World Cup because of an injury.

=== International appearances ===
International Caps
#	Date	Venue	Opponent	Result	Competition
1.	29 October 1961	Estadio Olímpico Universitario, Mexico City, Mexico	Paraguay	1–0	1962 FIFA World Cup qualification
2.	5 November 1961	Estadio Defensores del Chaco, Asunción, Paraguay	Paraguay	0–0	1962 FIFA World Cup qualification
3.	28 March 1962	Estadio Monumental, Buenos Aires, Argentina	Argentina	0–1	Friendly
4.	1 April 1962	El Campín, Bogotá, Colombia	Colombia	1–0	Friendly
