= 1957 Campeón de Campeones =

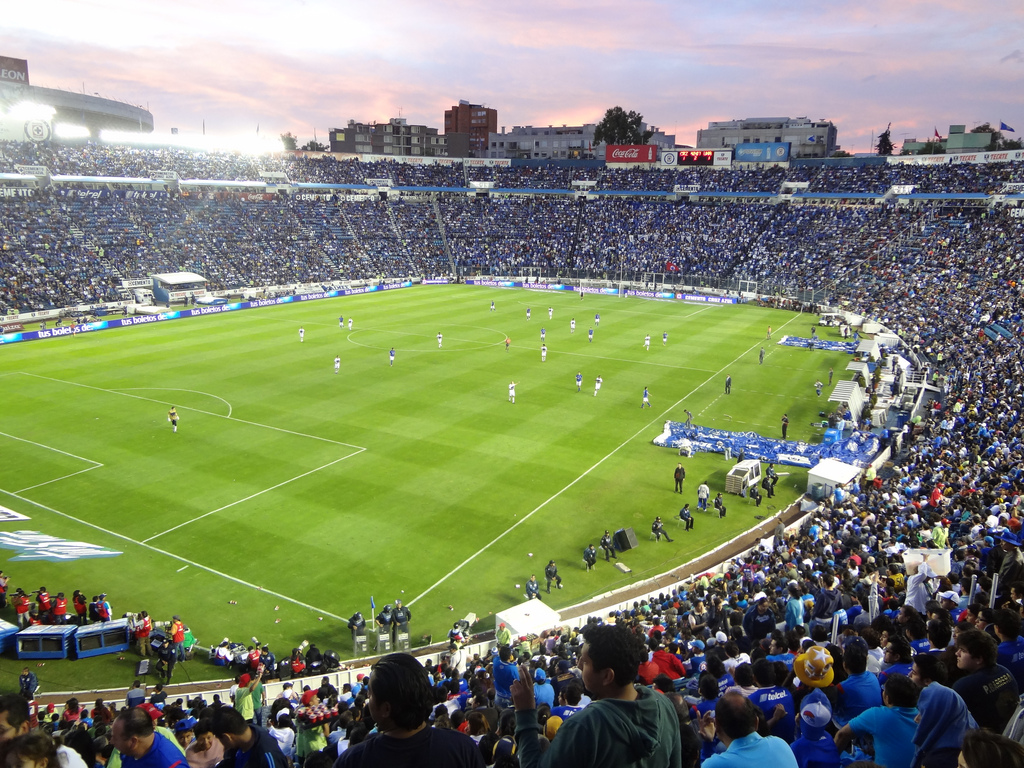
- Event: Campéon de Campeones
Guadalajara	Zacatepec
2	1
- Date: 5 May 1957
- Venue: Estadio Olímpico de la Ciudad de los Deportes, Mexico City
- Referee: Fernando Buergo
- Attendance: 50,000

The 1957 Campeón de Campeones is the 16th edition of the Campeón de Campeones, an annual football super cup match. (Note: The edition number was calculated based on figures provided by Goal.com, with the first Campeón de Campeones having been held in 1941–42.) The match was played at Estadio Olímpico de la Ciudad de los Deportes on 5 May 1957 between the 1956–57 Mexican Primera División winners Guadalajara and 1956–57 Copa México winners Zacatepec.

== Match details ==
5 May 1957

Guadalajara	2–1	Zacatepec
Gutiérrez 19'; Reyes 73'	Report	Cabaña 89'

Estadio Olímpico de la Ciudad de los Deportes
Attendance: 50,000
Referee: Fernando Buergo

Guadalajara
Jaime Gómez
Pedro Nuño
Guillermo Sepúlveda
José Villegas
Juan Jasso
Francisco Flores
Isidoro Díaz
Salvador Reyes Monteón
Crescencio Gutiérrez
Jesús Ponce
Raúl Arellano

Zacatepec:
Festa
Vela
Ortiz
Roca
Héctor Ortiz
Cárdenas
Martínez
Díaz
Cabañas
Jasso
Candía

Campeón de Campeones
1957 Winners
Guadalajara
First Title

== See also ==
- Campeón de Campeones
- Liga MX
- Copa MX
