= 1962 CONCACAF Champions' Cup =

1st edition of premier club football tournament organized by CONCACAF

Tournament details
- Dates: 25 March – 21 August
- Teams: 8

Final positions
- Champions: (Mexico) Guadalajara (1st title)
- Runners-up: (Guatemala) Comunicaciones

Tournament statistics
- Matches played: 14
- Goals scored: 37 (2.64 per match)
- Top scorer: Guido Alvarado (6 goals)

The 1962 CONCACAF Champions' Cup was the inaugural edition of the top international club competition organized by CONCACAF for clubs from North America, Central America and the Caribbean, the CONCACAF Champions' Cup. It determined the 1962 continental football champions in the CONCACAF region. The tournament was contested by 8 clubs from 7 national associations: Netherlands Antilles, Costa Rica, El Salvador, Guatemala, Haiti, Honduras and Mexico. The tournament was held from 25 March 1962 to 21 August 1962.

The tournament was split into three zones (North American, Central American and Caribbean), each one qualifying the winner to the final tournament, where the winners of the Central and Caribbean groups played a semifinal to decide who was going to play against the Northern group champion in the final. All the matches in the tournament were played under the home/away match system.

CD Guadalajara won that final, and became the first CONCACAF club champion.

== First Round ==
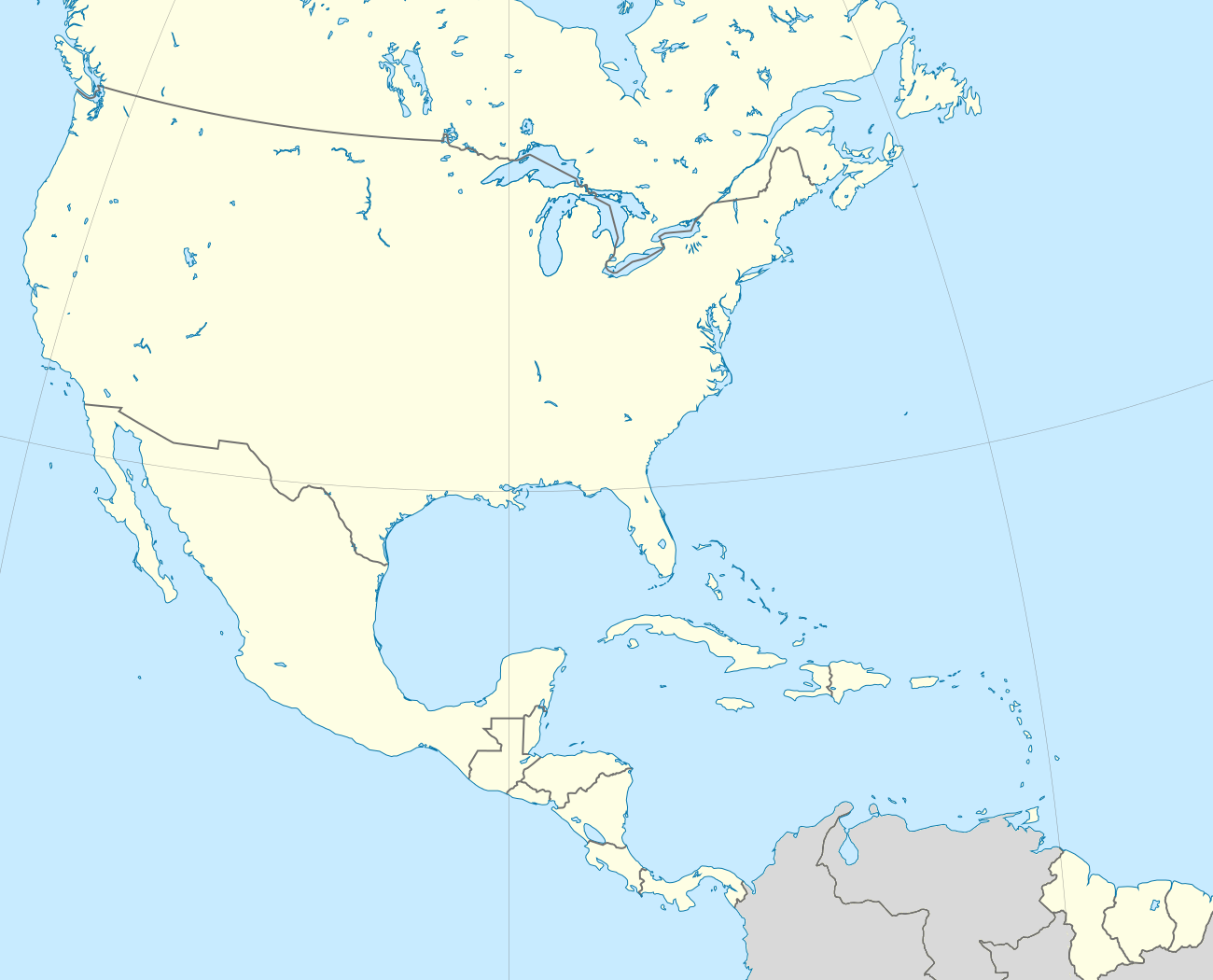
Location of teams of the 1962 CONCACAF Champions' Cup

25 March 1962 Central American Zone 1	Águila (El Salvador)	1–1	(Guatemala) Comunicaciones	San Salvador, El Salvador
	José Luis Soto 40'		Guillermo Palomo 7'	Stadium: Estadio Nacional Flor Blanca; Attendance: 15,000

1 April 1962 Central American Zone 1	Comunicaciones (Guatemala)	1–0 (2–1 agg.)	(El Salvador) Águila	Guatemala City, Guatemala
	López 16'		Nil	Stadium: Estadio Nacional Mateo Flores

1 April 1962 Central American Zone 2	Olimpia (Honduras)	0–1	(Costa Rica) Alajuelense	Tegucigalpa, Honduras
	Nil		Guido Alvarado 30'	Stadium: Estadio Nacional

8 April 1962 Central American Zone 2	Alajuelense (Costa Rica)	1–1 (2–1 agg.)	(Honduras) Olimpia	Alajuela, Costa Rica
	Guido Alvarado 41'		Carlos Suazo 54'	Stadium: Estadio Alejandro Morera Soto

8 April 1962 Caribbean Zone	Etoile Haïtienne (Haiti)	3–2	(Netherlands Antilles) Sithoc	Port-au-Prince, Haiti
	Lucien Pierre 8' 35'; Gérard Delpeche 59'		Esteban Thieman 60'; Romualdo Valeriam 81'	Stadium: Parc Leconte

15 April 1962 Caribbean Zone	Sithoc (Netherlands Antilles)	6–0 (8–3 agg.)	(Haiti) Etoile Haïtienne	Willemstad, Netherlands Antilles
	TBD; TBD; TBD; TBD; TBD		Nil	Stadium: Ergilio Hato Stadium

29 April 1962 North American Zone	Guadalajara (Mexico)	2–0	(Costa Rica) Herediano	Guadalajara, Mexico
	Salvador Reyes Monteón 28' 33'		Nil	Stadium: Estadio Jalisco

5 May 1962 North American Zone	Herediano (Costa Rica)	0–3 (0–5 agg.)	(Mexico) Guadalajara	Heredia, Costa Rica
	Nil		Javier Valdivia 18'; Javier Barba 29'; Francisco Flores 31'	Stadium: Estadio Eladio Rosabal Cordero

== Second round ==
15 April 1962	Comunicaciones (Guatemala)	3–1	(Costa Rica) Alajuelense	Guatemala City, Guatemala
	Hugo Peña 7' 50'; Jerónimo Pericullo 51'		Guido Alvarado 80'	Stadium: Estadio Nacional Mateo Flores

29 April 1962	Alajuelense (Costa Rica)	3–2 (4–5 agg.)	(Guatemala) Comunicaciones	Alajuela, Costa Rica
	Guido Alvarado 22' 72' 78'		Obdulio Pensamiento 20'; Hugo Peña 70' (pen.)	Stadium: Estadio Alejandro Morera Soto

== Semifinal ==
15 July 1962	Comunicaciones (Guatemala)	2–0	(Netherlands Antilles) Sithoc	Guatemala City, Guatemala
	Jerónimo Pericullo 8'; Fredy Masella 43'		Nil	Stadium: Estadio Nacional Mateo Flores

22 July 1962	Sithoc (Netherlands Antilles)	1–1 (1–3 agg.)	(Guatemala) Comunicaciones	Guatemala City, Guatemala
	Carlo Comenencia 65'		Hugo Peña 29'	Stadium: Estadio Nacional Mateo Flores

== Final ==
=== First leg ===
1962 CONCACAF Champions' Cup Final
29 July 1962
First leg

Comunicaciones (Guatemala)	0–1	(Mexico) Guadalajara
		Javier Valdivia 43'

Estadio Nacional Mateo Flores, Guatemala City
Attendance: 50,000

=== Second leg ===
21 August 1962
Second leg

Guadalajara (Mexico)	5–0	(Guatemala) Comunicaciones
Salvador Reyes 25', 47', 89'; Jasso 42', 61'	Report

Estadio Jalisco, Guadalajara
Referee: Víctor Vela (El Salvador)

Team details

Guadalajara
Comunicaciones

GK	(Mexico) Jaime ‘Tubo’ Gómez
DF	(Mexico) Arturo Chaires
DF	(Mexico) José Villegas
DF	(Mexico) Salas
DF	(Mexico) Juan Jasso
MF	(Mexico) Javier Valle
MF	(Mexico) Isidoro Díaz
MF	(Mexico) Salvador Reyes
MF	(Mexico) Héctor Hernández
FW	(Mexico) Sabás Ponce
FW	(Mexico) Francisco Jara
Substitutions:
Manager:
(Mexico) Javier de la Torre

GK	(Guatemala)
DF	(Guatemala)
DF	(Guatemala)
DF	(Guatemala)
DF	(Guatemala)
MF	(Guatemala)
MF	(Guatemala)
MF	(Guatemala)
MF	(Guatemala)
FW	(Guatemala)
FW	(Guatemala)
Substitutions:
Manager:
(Guatemala)

Guadalajara won 6–0 on aggregate

Champions
(Mexico)
Guadalajara
1st title

== Bracket ==
First Round

Second Round

Semifinal

Final

(El Salvador) Aguila
1
0
1

(Guatemala) Comunicaciones
1
1
2

(Guatemala) Comunicaciones
3
2
5

(Costa Rica) Alajuelense
1
3
4

(Honduras) Olimpia
0
1
1

(Costa Rica) Alajuelense
1
1
2

(Guatemala) Comunicaciones
2
1
3

(Netherlands Antilles) Sithoc
0
1
1

(Netherlands Antilles) Sithoc (bye)
-
-
-

--
-
-
-

(Haiti) Etoile Haïtienne
3
0
3

(Netherlands Antilles) Sithoc
2
6
8

(Guatemala) Comunicaciones
0
0
0

(Mexico) Guadalajara
1
5
6

(Mexico) Guadalajara (bye)
-
-
-

--
-
-
-

(Mexico) Guadalajara (bye)
-
-
-

--
-
-
-

(Mexico) Guadalajara
2
3
5

(Costa Rica) Herediano
0
0
0

== Final rankings ==
Pos	Team	Pld	W	D	L	GF	GA	GD	Pts	Result
1	(Mexico) Guadalajara	4	4	0	0	11	0	+11	8	Winners
2	(Guatemala) Comunicaciones	8	3	2	3	10	12	−2	8	Runners-up
3	(Netherlands Antilles) Sithoc	4	1	1	2	9	6	+3	3	Semifinalist
4	(Costa Rica) Alajuelense	4	2	1	1	6	6	0	5	Second round
5	(Haiti) Etoile Haïtienne	2	1	0	1	3	8	−5	2	First round
6	(El Salvador) Águila	2	0	1	1	1	2	−1	1	First round
7	(Honduras) Olimpia	2	0	1	1	1	2	−1	1	First round
8	(Costa Rica) Herediano	2	0	0	2	0	5	−5	0	First round
