= José Villegas (footballer, born 1934) =

Mexican footballer (1934–2021)

Personal information
- Full name: José Gerardo Villegas Tavares
- Date of birth: 20 June 1934
- Place of birth: La Experiencia, Mexico
- Date of death: 24 December 2021 (aged 87)
- Height: 1.71 m (5 ft 7 in)
- Position: Defender

Senior career*
Years	Team	Apps	(Gls)
1952–1953	La Piedad		
1953–1971	Guadalajara	428	

International career
1958–1962	Mexico	6	(0)
- * Club domestic league appearances and goals

José Gerardo "Jamaicón" Villegas Tavares (20 June 1934 – 24 December 2021) was a Mexican footballer who played as a defender.

Villegas spent the majority of his professional career at Guadalajara. Together with Sabás Ponce, he holds the record for the most league titles won in Mexican football. On the international stage, he represented Mexico at the FIFA World Cup in 1958 and 1962.

== Biography ==
Villegas, known as “El Jamaicón”, was born on June 20, 1934, in the community of La Experiencia, Zapopan, Jalisco. From an early age, he worked in local textile mills to help support his family, while also developing his passion for football. He began his career with Club Deportivo Imperio, where his defensive skills quickly drew attention. At just 15 years old, he was selected for the amateur Jalisco state team, and during a tournament was scouted by La Piedad. He signed with the club and played in the 1952–53 Primera División season. Following the team’s relegation and financial difficulties, he returned to Guadalajara.

In 1953, Villegas joined Guadalajara, making his debut in matchday 4 of the 1953–54 season. He remained with the club until the 1970–71 campaign, becoming a cornerstone of the defense during the celebrated Campeonísimo era. Alongside Sabás Ponce, he was one of only two players to participate in Guadalajara’s first eight league championships. Over the course of his career with the club, he won a total of 18 official titles.

Villegas also represented Mexico at the international level. He was part of the squad that competed in the 1958 FIFA World Cup in Sweden and took part in several international friendlies, including a notable exhibition match against Brazil’s Botafogo, where he faced Garrincha.

Villegas died on 24 December 2021, at the age of 87.

== 1962 World Cup ==
While Mexico prepared to play in the World Cup at Chile in 1962 it was said that if Villegas had defeated Garrincha time and time again, surely there was enough defensive strength in the Mexico national team for the World Cup. The Mexican Football Federation went on a tour of trial games with Ignacio Trelles at the head and their first stop was London, England. Trelles decided to line up “Piolín” Mota, a second-string goalkeeper. Mota was quite concerned with the startup but Trelles told him he had nothing to worry about as Villegas would be there to defend the goal. Mexico lost 8–0 against England. As a reporter approached him to interview him on his disappointing performance, he said he missed his mother and days had gone by where he could not eat "birria" and that life was not worth it if he was not in his town.

Another interesting fact was that, even though he had defeated Garrincha in league games, he was so afraid of him during the 1962 World Cup he constantly asked where the attacker was.

== Jamaicón Syndrome ==
Villegas also became known for an off-the-field episode in the lead-up to the 1958 FIFA World Cup in Sweden. Before the competition began, Mexico held a tour in Lisbon, Portugal, where the team played several friendly matches. During a team dinner, Villegas grew upset with the food, left the table, and wandered through the hotel gardens, visibly frustrated. When head coach Ignacio Trelles noticed his absence, he went out to look for him. Upon being found, the defender delivered a remark that would be remembered for decades: "How can I eat when they've prepared a dinner fit for paupers? What I want are my chalupas, some good sopes, not this garbage that isn’t even Mexican."

Despite his bout of homesickness, “El Jamaicón” remained with the squad and played in Mexico’s opening World Cup match against Sweden, which Mexico lost 3–0. An injury sustained in that game kept him out of the remaining two group-stage matches.

Nevertheless, the Lisbon episode eventually gave rise to what became known as “Jamaicón Syndrome”—a term describing the difficulty some Mexican athletes face when adapting to and performing outside their familiar environment.

== Honours ==
Guadalajara

- Primera División de México: 1956–57, 1958–59, 1959–60, 1960–61, 1961–62, 1963–64, 1964–65, 1969–70
