= Toluca FC =

Association football club in Toluca, Mexico

Toluca
- Full name: Deportivo Toluca Fútbol Club S.A. de C.V.
- Nicknames: Diablos Rojos (Red Devils); Los Escarlatas (The Scarlets); Los Choriceros (The Sausage-makers)
- Short name: TOL
- Founded: 12 February 1917; 109 years ago
- Ground: Nemesio Diez Stadium
- Capacity: 30,000
- Coordinates: 19°17′14″N 99°40′0″W
- Owner: Valentín Diez Morodo
- Chairman: Francisco Suinaga Conde
- Manager: Antonio Mohamed
- League: Liga MX
- Clausura 2026: Regular phase: 5th of 18; Final phase: Quarter-finals
- Website: tolucafc.com
Home colours	Away colours	Third colours

Deportivo Toluca Fútbol Club S.A. de C.V., commonly known as Toluca FC, is a professional football club based in Toluca, Mexico. The club competes in Liga MX, the top division of Mexican football, and plays its home matches at Nemesio Diez Stadium. The club is one of the most successful in Mexican football, having won 24 official titles. In domestic competition, the club has won twelve Liga MX titles, the second highest total in the competition's history, two Copa MX titles, and five Campeón de Campeones. In international competition, Toluca has won three CONCACAF Champions Cup titles, one Campeones Cup, and one Leagues Cup.

Founded in 1917, Toluca was a founding member of the Segunda División – Mexico's second-tier division – in 1950 before earning promotion to the top flight in 1953, from which it has never been relegated. The club established itself in Mexican football in the 1960s, winning back-to-back league titles and their first international title. A second successful period followed in the late 1990s and early 2000s, when it won four league titles and a second international title. A third successful period was in the mid-2020s, when Toluca won multiple domestic and international titles. Toluca will compete in the 2026 FIFA Intercontinental Cup and the 2029 FIFA Club World Cup, both for the first time in club history.

Toluca is commonly known as "Diablos Rojos" (Red Devils), with their traditional scarlet home kit also earning them the nickname "Los Escarlatas" (the Scarlets). They are also known as "Los Choriceros" (the Sausage-makers), a reference to chorizo, one of the city's traditional foods. Toluca is one of the major Mexican clubs without a derby. The club's all-time leading scorer is José Saturnino Cardozo, who played from 1995 to 2005 and scored 258 goals. Toluca also fields a women's team and maintains a reserve and youth academy whose sides have won several league titles.

== History ==
=== Foundation and early years (1917–1950) ===
Deportivo Toluca Fútbol Club S.A. de C.V., known as Toluca FC, is based in Toluca, State of Mexico. The club was founded on 12 February 1917 by a group of businessmen and local sports enthusiasts. It developed from two amateur football teams (La Huerta and Xinantécatl) linked to the Henkel Bross family, German Mexicans who were based in Toluca. La Huerta drew players from a family-owned hacienda, and Xinantécatl drew workers for the Toluca–Tenango and San Juan Railways and a utility company owned by the family. Between 1915 and 1917, both sides competed in friendly matches under the guidance of physical education coach Filiberto Navas Valdés which attracted local attention. Brothers Gerardo and Román Ferrat Alday, owners of the La Valenciana clothing business, formed their own side in 1917 to compete with Henkel's teams. After talks by the Ferrat brothers, brothers Francisco and Manuel Henkel Bross, Navas Valdés and other organizers, they established the club and called it Club Deportivo Toluca (CDT).

Several other company-sponsored teams then emerged in Toluca. The club organized a local competition in 1918 with La Huerta, Xinantécatl, Unión and Anahuác, which Toluca won. Toluca hosted Real España, a Mexico City football club, in their first match against outside opposition the following year. It remained the dominant club in the region for several years, although rivals emerged to challenge them. Prominent local player Fernando Barreto organized a succession of sides which aimed to defeat Toluca, beginning with Águila. When Águila failed to defeat Toluca and was dissolved, Barreto founded Cuauhtémoc; it was followed by Reforma, which finally defeated Toluca in 1923. Achieving his goal, Barreto dissolved Reforma, and many of the amateur players from these sides joined Toluca by 1925.

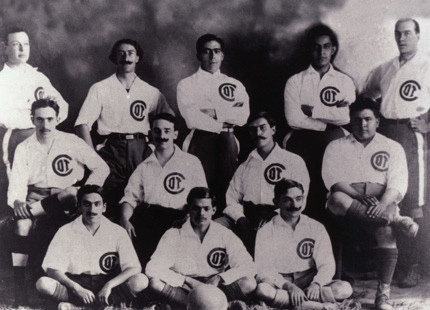
1917 team picture

Other clubs emerged across Mexico during the 1920s, including Industrial, Triángulo Verde, Constancia, and Necaxa. Facing limited local competition, Toluca sought matches against outside clubs, which included Irapuato, Guadalajara, América, and ADO Orizaba. Among the era's prominent players were the trio of Barreto, Ricardo Barraza and Vicente Téllez and the emerging Benito Contreras, who had come up through the club's ranks. Jesús Piña was the club's leading player by 1930 and Barreto, retired from playing, moved into a management role.

Toluca's first recorded international match was in 1935 against Costa Rican club La Libertad, a 2–0 home defeat. Toluca defeated the Basque Country national football team during their tour of Mexico two years later, when the Basque side also faced several local clubs and the Mexico national team. In the 1937 and 1938 national amateur tournaments, the State of Mexico team largely consisted of Toluca players. The club shifted their focus to local and inter-state competitions by 1943, appointing Samuel Martínez García to their management. Martínez García sought more involvement in the Reserve Tournament, organized in Mexico City, to expose the team to stiffer competition. Toluca won the championship in 1945, with Héctor Barraza their leading player. The club unsuccessfully tried to establish the Segunda División (Mexico's second-tier football league) two years later, but the league was not formally constituted until 1950.

=== Professional entry and promotion (1950–1960) ===
On 18 January 1950, thirty-three years after its founding, Toluca joined the newly established Segunda División for the 1950–51 season as part of the expansion of professional football in Mexico. The other founding clubs were Irapuato, Zamora, Pachuca, Querétaro, Morelia, and Zacatepec. Toluca won the Segunda División title in the 1952–53 season under Spanish coach Tomás Fábregas, earning promotion to the Primera División (Mexico's top-tier league). The title was secured on 18 January 1953 after a 3–3 draw with Irapuato at the Estadio Revolución in which Toluca came from three goals down. Toluca finished the season with 35 points, three ahead of second-place Veracruz. Toluca's striker Mateo de la Tijera ended the season as the tournament's top scorer with 22 goals.

Toluca made its Primera División debut on 9 August 1953 with a 2–1 victory against Atlante. The club has never been relegated since their promation, establishing one of the longest uninterrupted tenures in the top tier of Mexican football. Toluca opened their home stadium, then known as Campo Patria and now as Nemesio Diez Stadium, with a 1–4 loss in an 8 August 1954 exhibition match against Yugoslavia's Dinamo Zagreb. They won their first title in the 1955–56 Copa México, defeating Irapuato 2–1 in the 27 May 1956 final at the Estadio Olímpico Ciudad de los Deportes. In the 1956 Campeón de Campeones super sup, Toluca lost 2–1 to league champions León.

In 1959, following the death of club president Luis Gutiérrez Dosal, Toluca experienced a period of institutional instability. Mexican president Adolfo López Mateos, a native of the State of Mexico, asked Spanish-born businessman Nemesio Diez Riega to assume control of the club. Diez, who had held management roles at Toluca and was a sponsor, agreed to try and make the club league champions.

=== First success and transitional period (1960s–1980s) ===
Toluca's first major period of success came under coach Ignacio Trelles, who joined the club in October 1966. The club won its first league title in the 1966–67 season, clinching it on 19 February 1967 with a 2–0 victory over Necaxa. That season, Toluca striker Amaury Epaminondas was the league's top scorer with 21 goals. In the 1967 Campeón de Campeones super cup, Toluca defeated León 1–0 for the title. Toluca retained the title in the 1967–68 season; the championship was secured on 4 January 1968 with a 3–0 victory over Pumas UNAM, who finished second in the league. In the 1968 Campeón de Campeones super cup, Toluca faced Atlas and drew 3–3 on aggregate before winning on penalties.

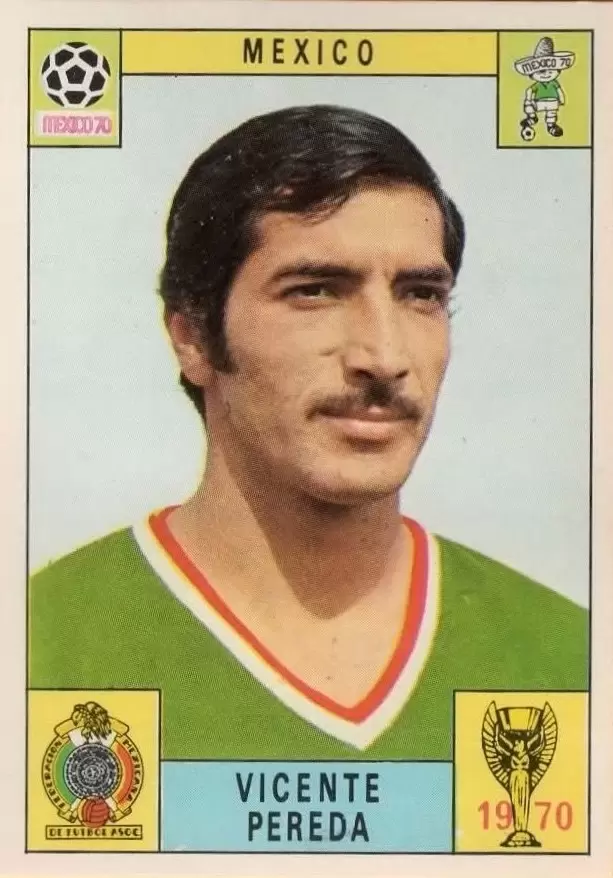
Vicente Pereda, a key player during the 1960s

In international competition, Toluca entered the 1968 CONCACAF Champions' Cup and advanced past the first round with a 7–3 aggregate victory over New York Greek American. Toluca were declared champions of their first international title on 19 December 1968 without a final played after the other finalists, Aurora of Guatemala and Transvaal of Suriname, were disqualified. Toluca then qualified for the inaugural Copa Interamericana against Argentina's Estudiantes de La Plata. After losing 2–1 at home and winning 2–1 away in Buenos Aires, a third play-off match was held in Montevideo; Estudiantes won 3–0 to claim the title. In the 1969–70 season, Toluca striker Vicente Pereda was the league's top scorer with 20 goals.

Toluca won its third league championship in the 1974–75 season under Uruguayan manager Ricardo de León. The club finished atop the league table and advanced to the playoffs. The title was sealed on 26 June 1975 in the decisive match against León which ended 1–0. In the 1975 Campeón de Campeones super cup, Toluca lost 1–0 against Pumas UNAM in the Estadio Olímpico Universitario. Throughout his tenure, De León implemented a defensive system inspired by the Italian catenaccio; Toluca was nicknamed Cangrejo Rojo ("Red Crab") for its defensive style of play.

Following its success, Toluca endured a period without league titles through the 1980s and into the early 1990s. It frequently finished in the bottom half of the table and qualified for the playoffs only occasionally, although the club never dropped out of the top flight. An exception was in 1989, when Toluca won the 1988–89 Copa México. The club defeated Leones Negros UdeG 3–2 on aggregate in the final, ending a 14-year wait for a title. However, the league title remained out of reach during this period.

=== Second dominant era (1998–2010) ===
In August 1997, Toluca appointed Mexican coach Enrique Meza. Before the Verano 1998 season, Meza took the squad on a December 1997 pre-season tour of Croatia and Slovenia to develop international experience and team cohesion. The tour yielded two wins and a draw against local sides, with Meza noting a stronger sense of unity among the players when they returned. Toluca won the Verano 1998 tournament, defeating Necaxa 6–4 on aggregate in the final to secure their fourth league title on 10 May 1998 – their first in 23 years. Toluca striker José Saturnino Cardozo, who joined the club in 1995, finished as the tournament's top scorer with 18 goals: 13 in the regular season and five in the playoffs. Toluca won its fifth league title the following year with the Verano 1999, topping the table before defeating Atlas on penalties after a 5–5 aggregate in the final. The match is considered one of the greatest finals in Mexican football history. Cardozo was the league's top scorer again with 20 goals: 15 in the regular season and five in the playoffs.

Toluca continued its success under Meza into the new century, winning the Verano 2000 with a 7–1 aggregate victory over Santos Laguna for their sixth league championship. Three days after the June 2000 victory, club owner Nemesio Diez Riega died; his son, Valentín Diez Morodo, assumed ownership of the club. During Invierno 2000, Meza left in September to coach the Mexico national team. Toluca still reached the final against Monarcas Morelia, drawing 3–3 on aggregate before losing on penalties. During Invierno 2001, Argentine manager Ricardo La Volpe joined Toluca. Toluca had a strong Apertura 2002 under La Volpe, although he left during the season to manage the Mexico national team. Toluca won the championship in December under newly appointed Argentine coach Alberto Jorge, defeating Monarcas Morelia 4–2 on aggregate in the final for the club's seventh league title. Cardozo was the season's top scorer with 36 goals: 29 in the regular season and seven in the playoffs. The total is the highest goal tally recorded in a single tournament in Mexican football history.

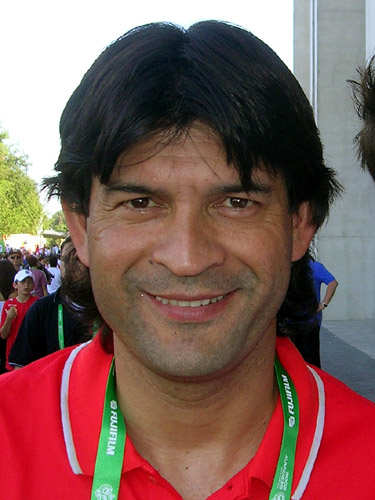
Paraguayan forward José Saturnino Cardozo is the club's all-time goalscorer.

Toluca won their second international title in October with the 2003 CONCACAF Champions' Cup under Brazilian coach Ricardo Ferretti, defeating Monarcas Morelia 5–4 on aggregate. They defeated América 6–0 on 1 November (during the Apertura 2003 season) at Nemesio Diez Stadium, with a collective team goal by Cardozo considered one of the finest in Liga MX history. Toluca played in the 2003 Campeón de Campeones super cup about two weeks later, drawing 1–1 in regular time before defeating Monterrey on penalties. Cardozo was the league's top scorer again with 22 goals: 21 in the regular season and one in the playoffs.

Cardozo left at the end of Clausura 2005 as the club's all-time leading scorer, with 258 goals. Toluca reached the Apertura 2005 final against Monterrey under Argentine coach Américo Gallego, drawing 3–3 at home before winning 3–0 away for the title. Gallego was often criticized for his disciplined, defensively oriented style of play throughout the tournament. In the 2006 Campeón de Campeones super cup, Toluca defeated Pachuca 2–0 on aggregate to win the title. In April 2006, Toluca reached the 2006 CONCACAF Champions' Cup final against América. After a goalless first leg, Toluca lost 2–1 away at the Estadio Azteca in the second leg, with all the goals scored in extra time. Later that year, Toluca reached the Apertura 2006 final against Guadalajara but lost 3–2 on aggregate to finish as runners-up. Toluca striker Bruno Marioni was the league's top scorer with 15 goals: 11 in the regular season and four in the playoffs.

Under Mexican coach José Manuel de la Torre, Toluca claimed the Apertura 2008 championship, defeating Cruz Azul on penalties after a 2–2 aggregate draw in the final to secure their ninth league title. De la Torre credited the team's tactical discipline and mental resilience as key factors in their success throughout the tournament. Toluca striker Héctor Mancilla finished as the league's top scorer with 13 goals: 11 in the regular season and two in the playoffs. In the Clausura 2009 season, Mancilla again finished as the league's top scorer with 14 goals in the regular season. De la Torre led Toluca to their tenth league title in the Bicentenario 2010 tournament, defeating Santos Laguna on penalties after a 2–2 aggregate draw in the final.

=== Title drought (2010–2020) ===
After the Bicentenario 2010 title, Toluca went without a league title for the rest of the 2010s. In the Apertura 2011 and Clausura 2012 seasons, Toluca striker Iván Alonso finished as the league's top scorer in both, with 14 goals in the former and 12 in the latter, ten of which came in the regular season and two in the playoffs. In Apertura 2013 season, Toluca striker Pablo Velázquez was the league's top scorer with 13 goals, twelve in the regular season and one in the playoffs. In April 2014, with Cardozo as head coach, Toluca reached the 2013–14 CONCACAF Champions League final against Cruz Azul. After a goalless first leg away, the return leg at Nemesio Diez Stadium ended 1–1 and Cruz Azul claimed the title on away goals. Toluca reached the Apertura 2012 final against Tijuana, who had recently been promoted from the second division, but lost 4–1 on aggregate.

During Apertura 2016, Toluca played their home matches at Estadio Universitario Alberto "Chivo" Córdoba while Nemesio Diez Stadium was renovated. Their final match at the temporary venue was on 8 January 2017, a 4–1 victory against Atlas on the opening day of Clausura 2017, before the club returned to Nemesio Diez Stadium.

On 12 February 2017, the club's centenary, Toluca defeated Veracruz 1–0 at home with a header by Colombian forward Fernando Uribe in the sixth round of Clausura 2017. The club had a commemorative pregame ceremony on the pitch with an orchestra and a display of the crests used throughout its history. Tributes were paid to several players, and the event was attended by prominent figures in Mexican football. At halftime, the club's board presented awards to former players and to the families of deceased players who had made significant contributions to the club. On 25 July 2017, Toluca drew 0–0 in a centenary friendly against Atlético Madrid at Nemesio Diez Stadium.

Toluca reached the 2018 Copa MX's Clausura 2018 final under head coach Hernán Cristante, losing with an own goal in the closing minutes of a single-leg match against Necaxa at Estadio Victoria. Weeks later they were the top-seeded team of the Liga MX's Clausura 2018 season and reached the final, where they were defeated 3–2 on aggregate by Santos Laguna. (Note: Toluca was the second Mexican club to lose league and domestic cup finals in the same season, after Club América in 1990–91.)

=== 2021–present ===
In the Guard1anes 2021 season, Toluca striker Alexis Canelo finished as the league's top scorer with 14 goals: eleven in the regular season and three in the playoffs. At the end of the Clausura 2022 season, Toluca finished 16th under manager Ignacio Ambriz after a 4–4 draw with León. The relegation table, calculated from points accumulated over three seasons, made Toluca eligible for relegation. Since Liga MX had abolished the relegation system, however, the club was instead required to pay a MXN$33 million fine. Its board implemented a transfer strategy, investing about €92 million over three years to strengthen the team after more than a decade without a league title. In Apertura 2022, Toluca reached the final but were defeated by Pachuca 8–2 on aggregate.

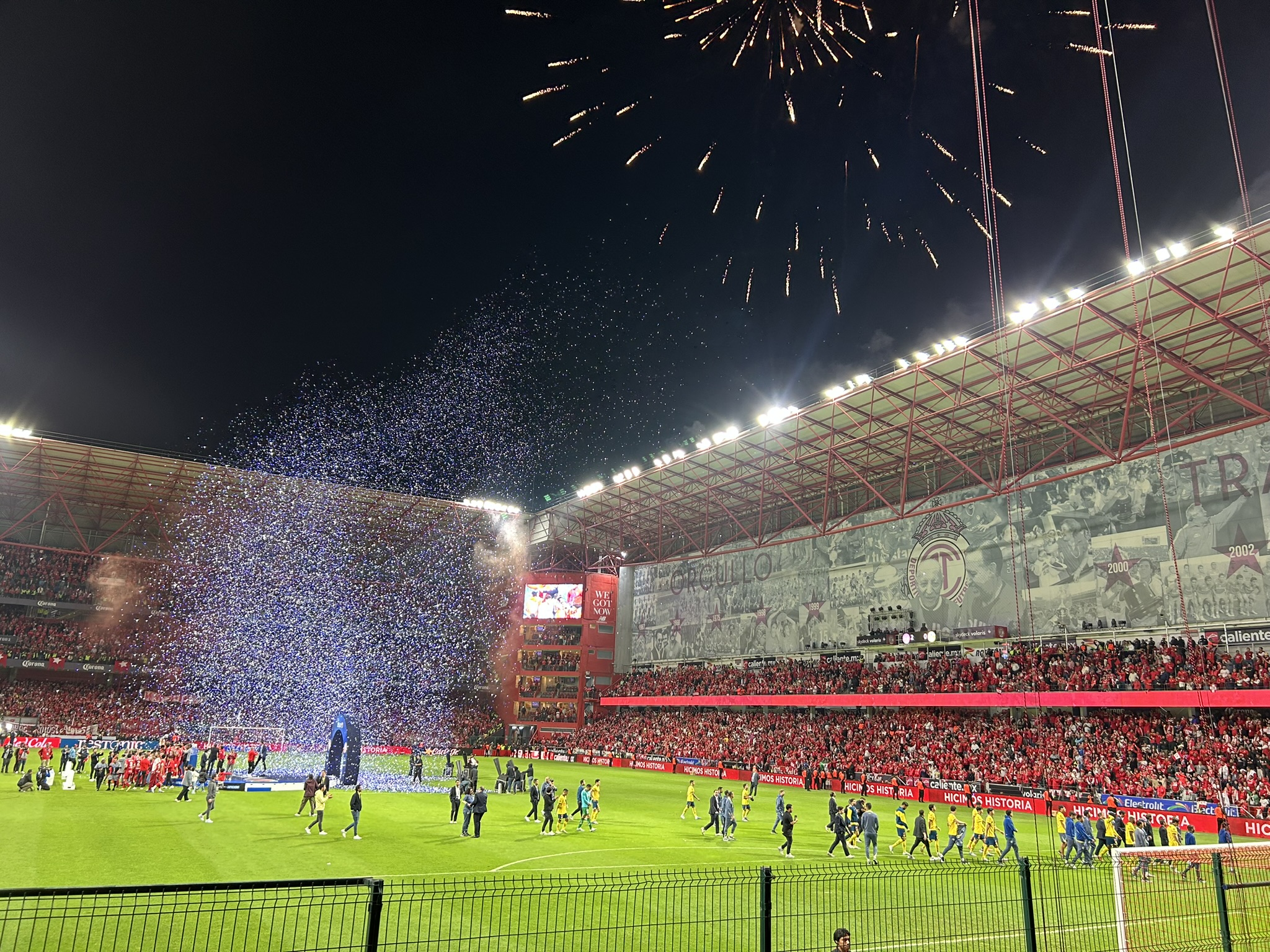
Toluca celebrates its eleventh title against Club América in the Clausura 2025 final

In the Apertura 2024 season, Toluca striker Paulinho finished as the league's top scorer with 13 goals in the regular season. In December 2024, Argentine coach Antonio Mohamed was appointed before the Clausura 2025 season. Toluca finished atop the table during the season and reached the final against América, who were seeking a fourth consecutive league title. Toluca defeated them 2–0 on aggregate for their eleventh league title, their first in 15 years. Paulinho was again the league's top scorer with 14 goals: twelve in the regular season and two in the playoffs. Toluca and América faced each other again for the 2025 Campeón de Campeones super cup, which Toluca won 1–3. The club continued its success in the Apertura 2025 season, again finishing first. They faced Tigres UANL in the final, drawing 2–2 on aggregate before defeating them 9–8 on penalties for their twelfth league title and second consecutive league championship. (Note: Toluca was one of the few Mexican clubs to win back-to-back titles in the torneos cortos (short tournaments) era of Liga MX, where the annual calendar is divided into two short tournaments concluded by a liguilla (playoff) – a format introduced in the 1996–97 season.) Paulinho was again the league's top scorer with 15 goals: twelve in the regular season and three in the playoffs.

Toluca competed in the 2026 CONCACAF Champions Cup, reaching the final against Tigres UANL after defeating several North American clubs in the knockout stage. The final was played as a single-leg match at Nemesio Diez Stadium, with Toluca and Tigres drawing 1–1 after extra time before Toluca won 6–5 on penalties. Toluca's third CONCACAF Champions Cup title was its first international title in 23 years. The victory qualified Toluca for the 2026 FIFA Intercontinental Cup and the 2029 FIFA Club World Cup, both for the first time in club history.

On 25 July 2026, Toluca lost the 2026 Campeón de Campeones super cup 3–1 to Cruz Azul at Dignity Health Sports Park. The club faced Monterrey in the 6 September 2026 Leagues Cup final at Shell Energy Stadium, winning 2–0 for their first Leagues Cup title and becoming the first Liga MX club to win the competition since it received CONCACAF sanctioning.

== Club identity ==
Toluca is the second-most-successful club in Liga MX history with twelve league titles, tied with Guadalajara and behind only América. It has been among the division's most consistent competitors since the introduction of the torneos cortos (short tournaments) format in 1996, when the annual Liga MX season was divided into two tournaments ending with a liguilla (playoff). Toluca does not have the same level of popular recognition as the traditional Big Four, and there is debate in Mexican-football media about whether it should be included in that group or recognized as part of a Big Five. Several players, football figures, and sports analysts have cited the club's league titles and presence in the top division as grounds for considering Toluca among the most important clubs in Mexican football.

Its best-known nickname is "Diablos Rojos" (Red Devils), highlighting the club's competitive resolve. The nickname is also believed to derive from the devil's hand tree, a plant native to the State of Mexico whose color matches the club's primary color and whose flower resembles a hand. Toluca's mascot, Diablito (Little Devil), has taken several forms which include designs aimed at younger supporters. The club is also known as "Los Escarlatas" (the Scarlets, a reference to the color of their home kit) and "Los Choriceros" (the Sausage-makers), a reference to chorizo (a traditional city food).

Toluca is one of the major Mexican clubs without derby. Although matches against other clubs have competitive weight due to playoff potential, none are traditional derbies. Toluca had contested a regional derby known as the Clásico Mexiquense against Toros Neza, a club based in Nezahualcóyotl. The derby, during the 1993–94 season, ended when Toros Neza were relegated at the end of the spring 2000 season.

== Crest and colors ==
Toluca's crest has undergone several changes during its history, retaining core design elements. The original had a white background with a red C-shaped circle enclosing the initials "DT" (Deportivo Toluca), with the "C" for Club; the full abbreviation, CDT (Club Deportivo Toluca), is consistent. Subsequent versions incorporated olive branches and a crown with a cross on top framing the CDT monogram on a white circular background, with "Club Deportivo Toluca" inscribed. Stars representing each league championship were added above the crown.

In November 2016, a commemorative version was introduced as part of the club's centennial celebrations; the CDT monogram is in a circular frame with the inscription Deportivo Toluca Fútbol Club. The circular border is blue on the upper half, transitioning to the green, white, and red of the Mexican flag on the lower half. The club has three versions of its crest: a retro logo based on the original CDT monogram, an institutional crest with olive branches and the crown, and a commercial crest incorporating the green, white, red, and blue introduced in the centenary design.

Toluca's primary home kit is red; an away kit is typically white, and a third kit varies by season. The club's colors have evolved since its founding, when the team wore white shirts with blue shorts and socks (a combination chosen by co-founder Román Ferrat Alday). A horizontal blue stripe was added to the shirt around 1925, and in 1929 the club adopted red and white as its primary colors.

Toluca's kit is supplied by the American sportswear company New Balance as part of a four-year contract signed in 2023. The Mexican motor-oil company Roshfrans is the club's main sponsor. Other sponsors on Toluca's kit include Red Cola, Grupo Caliente, and Corona. In January 2025, Mexican airline Volaris became the club's airline partner. Electrolit has been a club sponsor since 2024, following previous sponsorships of Toluca's women's and youth teams. In May 2026, GAC became a partner of Toluca as its automotive sponsor. Previous kit suppliers have included Under Armour, Atletica, Diadora, and Corona Sports.

1917–1924	1925–1929	1929–present

== Support ==
The club's primary supporter group, Barra Perra Brava (Fierce Bitch Group), was founded in December 1985 by a group of local fans led by Rolando González Medina; many were truck drivers who gathered at matches before the group became large enough for Toluca to designate part of the stadium for them. The group takes its name from González Medina's nickname, "La Perra" ("the bitch"), and was originally known as Porra Brava before adopting its current name; the term barra brava derives from Argentine supporter groups. The group is also commonly referred to simply as Perra Brava.

Traditionally located in the non-shaded stands behind the goal at Nemesio Diez Stadium, the section was originally designated for visiting supporters before Perra Brava claimed it as their own and were formally assigned the area. The group is known for its members removing their shirts when Toluca scores its first goal, regardless of weather. The tradition originated during a match against Monterrey played in sleet; González Medina removed his shirt to celebrate a goal, a gesture which was adopted by other members and became a custom. On matchdays, the group organizes supporter caravans, banners, and pre-match displays.

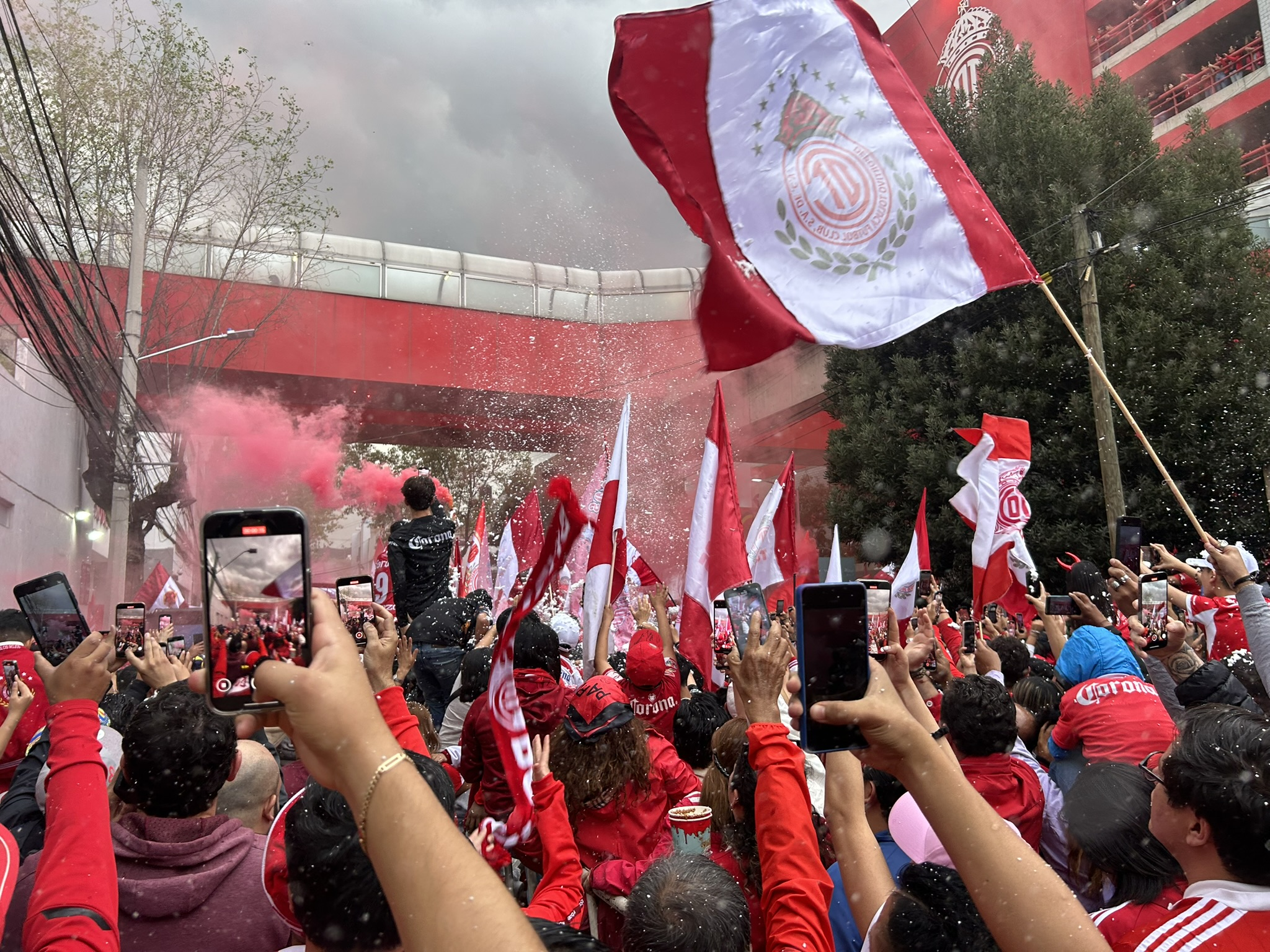
Toluca supporters chanting outside Nemesio Diez Stadium before a match

The group is registered as a non-profit organization, maintains an office, and advocates a family-oriented atmosphere at matches. It opposes violence in football stadiums, and has sought legislation in favor of prosecuting those who engage in violent activities during matches. The group organizes charitable initiatives in the State of Mexico, including toy, clothing, and adaptive equipment donations, athletic events such as road races, tree-planting drives, and community outreach programs.

Other supporter groups have emerged from the Toluca fanbase since Perra Brava. Among them is La Banda del Rojo (the Red Ones' Band), founded in February 2004 by Ángel Contreras Valinor with 26 members and originally a breakaway youth faction of Perra Brava. The group, which adopted a South American style of support characterized by continuous chanting, coordinated banners and musical instruments, is also located in the non-shaded stands of the stadium. After the group faced resistance from other supporter groups and the club due to its unorthodox style, it was eventually accepted. During the 2020s, the group adopted "La Cumbia de los Trapos" by the Argentine group Yerba Brava as an unofficial anthem sung throughout matches.

Toluca attendance was the highest in Liga MX for the five league tournaments played between 2023 and 2025, averaging 94 percent occupancy per match. National support has fluctuated in surveys conducted by Mexican polling firm Consulta Mitofsky. The club ranked ninth nationally in 2016 and 2017 with 2.6 and 2.3 percent of respondents, respectively, calling it their preferred club; the percentages rose to 2.5 in 2020 and 3.0 in 2022, when it ranked seventh. A 2024 study by Nielsen Sports Mexico ranked Toluca eighth among Liga MX clubs, with 3.1 percent of respondents calling it their favorite. In Mitofsky's 2025 survey, Toluca ranked fifth among the most-supported clubs in Mexico with 4.4 percent and fifth in interest at 5.3 percent. Toluca's 2026 share rose to 6.1 percent, maintaining fifth place, with Mitofsky attributing part of the growth to the club's championships.

== Stadium ==
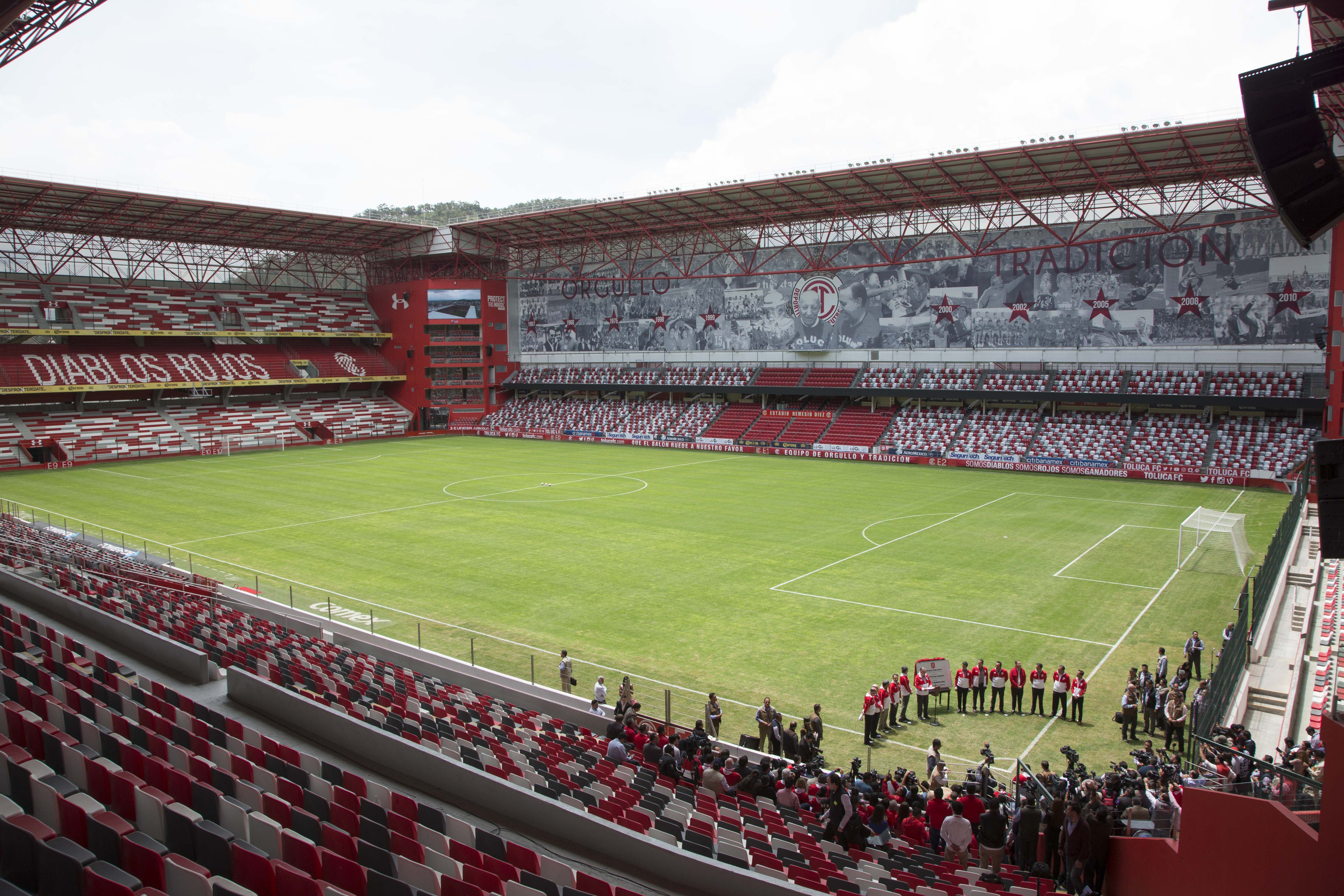
Nemesio Diez Stadium, known for its compact shape and its stands' close proximity to the pitch

Toluca's downtown Nemesio Diez Stadium, one of Mexico's oldest football stadiums, is the club's home ground. Inaugurated on 8 August 1954, the stadium has had several names before being renamed to honor Nemesio Diez Riega. It has a capacity of 30,000 and is at an elevation of about 2,670 m (8,760 ft) above sea level, making it one of Mexico's highest-altitude football stadiums. The stadium has two nicknames: "La Bombonera" (the Chocolate Box, a reference to its compact shape) and "El Infierno" (Hell), a nod to club nickname "Diablos Rojos" (Red Devils).

It has hosted FIFA World Cup matches in 1970 and 1986, the 1975 Pan American Games, the 1983 FIFA World Youth Championship, and the 1990 Central American and Caribbean Games. The stadium was renovated in 2017, expanding its capacity and updating its audiovisual infrastructure while preserving its English-style architecture (including the stands' close proximity to the pitch).

Before playing at Nemesio Diez Stadium, Toluca's earliest facilities were a football pitch with wooden stands on present-day Paseo Colón in downtown Toluca. In 1919, the club relocated to the grounds of the Presa de Gachupines. It was their headquarters until 1921, when they moved to Campo del Tívoli (a venue which hosted international matches). Campo del Tívoli was the club's home ground after their promotion to the professional ranks until 1952, when they moved to Campo Patria (the site of Nemesio Diez Stadium ).

== Management ==
Toluca's manager is Antonio Mohamed, who joined the club in December 2024. Under Mohamed, the club won consecutive league titles in the Clausura 2025 and Apertura 2025, the 2025 Campeón de Campeones super cup, the 2025 Campeones Cup and the 2026 CONCACAF Champions Cup; this made him one of the most successful managers in club history.

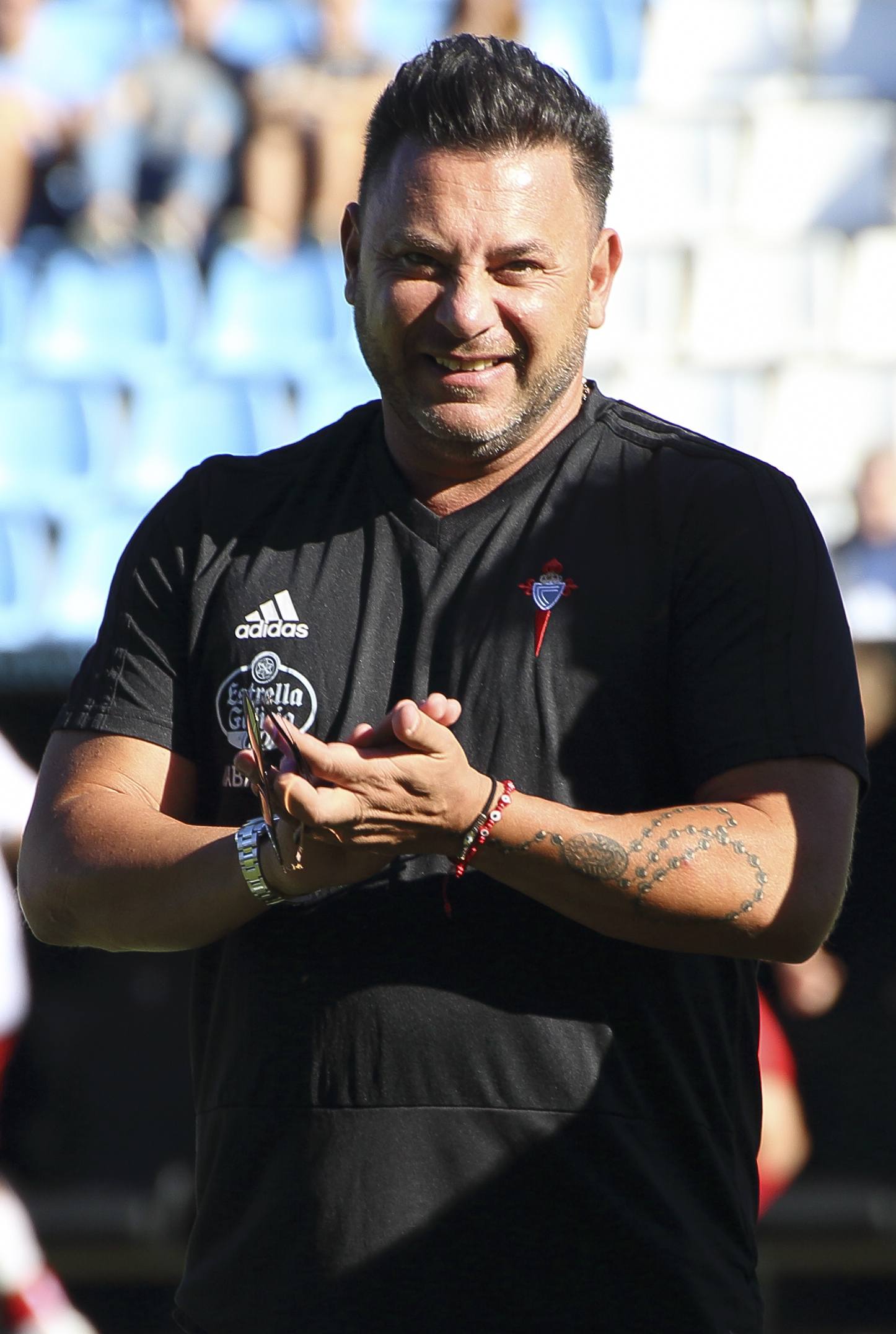
Antonio Mohamed, Toluca's head coach

=== Coaching staff ===
Position	Staff	Source
Manager	Antonio Mohamed	
Assistant managers	Pablo Morant	
Assistant managers	Shayr Mohamed	
Goalkeeper coach	Óscar Resano	
Fitness coaches	Carlos Kenny	
Fitness coaches	Stefano Zito	
Physiotherapists	Raymundo Cruz	
Team doctors	Adolfo Martínez	
Team doctors	Carlos Villasana	

=== Executive team ===
Position	Staff	Source
Owner	(Mexico) Valentín Diez Morodo	
President	(Mexico) Francisco Suinaga Conde	
Vice President	(Mexico) Santiago San Román	
Board Member	(Mexico) Arturo Pérez Arredondo	
Sports Management	(Mexico) Sinha	
Marketing Director	(Mexico) Rubén Cuevas	
Academy Director	(Argentina) Guillermo Morigi	

== Players ==
=== First-team squad ===
As of 23 July 2026

Note: Flags indicate national team as defined under FIFA eligibility rules; some limited exceptions apply. Players may hold more than one non-FIFA nationality.

No.	Pos.	Nation	Player
1	GK	MEX	Hugo González
2	DF	MEX	Diego Barbosa
3	DF	MEX	Antonio Briseño
4	DF	URU	Bruno Méndez
5	MF	ARG	Franco Romero
6	DF	URU	Federico Pereira
7	MF	MEX	Víctor Guzmán
8	MF	ARG	Nicolás Castro
9	FW	MEX	Alexis Vega
10	MF	MEX	Jesús Ricardo Angulo
11	FW	BRA	Helinho
12	GK	MEX	Ronaldo Beltrán
13	DF	BRA	Luan Garcia
14	MF	MEX	Marcel Ruiz

No.	Pos.	Nation	Player
15	MF	MEX	Pável Pérez
16	FW	URU	Federico Viñas
17	DF	MEX	Brian García
18	GK	MEX	David Shrem
19	MF	ARG	Santiago Simón
20	DF	MEX	Jesús Gallardo
21	FW	MEX	Iván López
22	GK	MEX	Luis García
23	FW	MEX	Oswaldo Virgen
24	MF	USA	Fernando Arce Jr. (on loan from Puebla)
25	DF	MEX	Everardo López
26	FW	POR	Paulinho
29	MF	MEX	Jorge Díaz
35	MF	MEX	Érick Gutiérrez (on loan from Guadalajara)

=== Youth squad ===
Note: Flags indicate national team as defined under FIFA eligibility rules; some limited exceptions apply. Players may hold more than one non-FIFA nationality.

No.	Pos.	Nation	Player
184	DF	MEX	Sebastián Aceves
191	FW	MEX	Carlos Carrillo

No.	Pos.	Nation	Player
205	MF	MEX	Edher Segura

=== On loan ===
Note: Flags indicate national team as defined under FIFA eligibility rules; some limited exceptions apply. Players may hold more than one non-FIFA nationality.

No.	Pos.	Nation	Player
—	MF	USA	Frankie Amaya (at CF Montréal)
—	FW	URU	Anderson Duarte (at Atlético San Luis)

No.	Pos.	Nation	Player
—	FW	PAR	Robert Morales (at Pumas UNAM)
—	FW	URU	Franco Rossi (at Chapecoense)

=== International players ===
National team	Category	Players
Argentina	Senior	Santiago Simón
Mexico	Senior	Alexis Vega, Jesús Gallardo, Everardo López
Portugal	Senior	Paulinho
Uruguay	Senior	Federico Viñas

== Honours ==
Toluca is one of the most successful clubs in Mexican football, having won 24 official titles: twelve Liga MX titles, the second highest total in the competition's history, along with two Copa MX titles, five Campeón de Campeones, three CONCACAF Champions Cup titles, and one Leagues Cup.

=== Domestic ===
Type	Competition	Titles	Winning years	Runners-up	Source
Top division	Liga MX	12	1966–67, 1967–68, 1974–75, Ver–1998, Ver–1999, Ver–2000, Ape–2002, Ape–2005, Ape–2008, Bic–2010, Cla–2025, Ape–2025	1956–57, 1957–58, 1970–71, Inv–2000, Ape–2006, Ape–2012, Cla–2018, Ape–2022	
Top division	Copa MX	2	1955–56, 1988–89	1960–61, Cla–2018	
Top division	Campeón de Campeones	5	1967, 1968, 2003, 2006, 2025	1956, 1975, 1989, 2026	
Promotion division	Segunda División	1	1952–53	—	
Promotion division	Copa México de la Segunda División	0	—	1951–52	
Promotion division	Campeón de Campeones de la Segunda División	1	1953	—	

=== International ===
Competition	Titles	Winning years	Runners-up	Source
Copa Interamericana	0	–	1969	
CONCACAF Champions Cup	3	1968, 2003, 2026	1998, 2006, 2013–14	
Campeones Cup	1	2025	–	
Leagues Cup	1^{s}	2026	–	

Notes

- record
- ^{s} shared record

== International competitions ==
Toluca has competed in several international tournaments. As a CONCACAF club, representing the North American, Central American, and Caribbean football confederation, their primary regional competition is the CONCACAF Champions Cup; they have participated a number of times since 1968, winning the title in 1968, 2003, and 2026. The 1968 title qualified them for the Copa Interamericana, where they were runners-up. Toluca was also invited to CONMEBOL tournaments (the South American football confederation), including the Copa Libertadores, Copa Sudamericana, and the defunct Copa Merconorte, from 2000 to 2016. The club has competed in the Leagues Cup – a competition between Liga MX and Major League Soccer (MLS) clubs – since 2023, and were champions in 2026.

Note: Competitions won are in bold

Competition	Participations	Editions	Source
CONCACAF Champions Cup	14	**1968**, 1969, 1972, 1998, 1999, 2000, **2003**, 2006, 2009–2010, 2010–2011, 2013–2014, 2019, 2024, **2026**	
Leagues Cup	4	2023, 2024, 2025, **2026**	
Copa Libertadores	3	2007, 2013, 2016	
Copa Sudamericana	1	2006	
Copa Interamericana	1	1969	
Copa Merconorte	1	2000	

=== By competition ===
- Active competitions are in **bold**.

Competition	Seasons	Pld	W	D	L	GF	GA	GD	Pts	Source
**CONCACAF Champions Cup**	14	60	30	14	16	109	66	+43	104
**Leagues Cup**	4	12	7	4	1	28	17	+11	25
Copa Libertadores	3	22	12	3	7	33	32	+1	39
Copa Sudamericana	1	6	3	0	3	7	7	0	9
Copa Interamericana	1	3	1	0	2	3	6	−3	3
Copa Merconorte	1	6	2	2	2	15	11	+4	8
Total	24	109	55	23	31	195	139	+56	188

== Affiliate teams ==
=== Women's club ===
The Toluca women's team debuted in the Liga MX Femenil (Mexico's top women's football league) in 2017, after hosting the inaugural Copa MX Femenil before the league's first season. In their first league match, Toluca defeated Cruz Azul 2–1. The team plays home matches at Nemesio Diez Stadium and the Metepec Facilities in Metepec, State of Mexico; the latter is also their training ground. It signed several international players in 2026, including French players Eugénie Le Sommer, Amandine Henry and Faustine Robert and Swedish player Sofia Jakobsson.

=== Reserves and academy ===
Toluca maintains several reserve and youth academy teams at the under-23 level, a number of which have won youth-league titles. One reserve team, Atlético Mexiquense, was an affiliate club which competed in Ascenso MX (Mexico's second-tier division) from 1997 until the end of the Clausura 2009 season. Another reserve team, Toluca Premier, competed in the Liga Premier de Ascenso (Mexico's third-tier division) from 2015 to 2019. In addition to its youth academy, Toluca operates about 40 sponsored football schools in several Mexican states with a pathway for progression to the club's reserve and academy system.

== Bibliography ==
- Cid y Mulet, Juan (1960). El libro de oro del fútbol mexicano (in Spanish). B. Costa-Amic.
- Novo Valencia, Gerardo (2015). Toluquerencias (in Spanish). Fondo Editorial Estado de México. ISBN 6074954410.
