= 1964 Campeón de Campeones =

América	Guadalajara
0	2
- Date: 26 April 1964
- Venue: Estadio Olímpico Universitario, Mexico D.F.
- Referee: Ramiro Garcia
- Attendance: 70,000

The 1964 Campeón de Campeones was the 23rd edition of the Campeón de Campeones, an annual football super cup match. (Note: The edition number was calculated based on figures provided by Goal.com, with the first Campeón de Campeones having been held in 1941–42.) The match was played at Estadio Olímpico Universitario on 26 April 1964 between the 1963–64 Mexican Primera División winners Guadalajara and 1963–64 Copa México winners América.

== Match details ==
26 April 1964
21:00 CET

América	0–2	Guadalajara
		Barba 24'; Reyes 81'

Estadio Olimpico Universitario, Mexico D.F.
Attendance: 70,000
Referee: Ramiro Garcia

América	Guadalajara

América: Iniestra De Sales Bosco Portugal Cuenca Schandlein Zague Ortiz Fragoso Gonzalez Juracy	Guadalajara: Calderon Chaires Sepulveda Villegas Jasso Moreno Barba Díaz Reyes Jara Valdivia

Campeón de Campeones
1964 Winners
Guadalajara
Fifth Title
