= 1988–89 Copa México =

The 1988–89 Copa México is the 61st staging of the Copa México, the 34th staging in the professional era.

The competition started on September 8, 1988, and concluded on January 25, 1989 with the final, in which Toluca lifted the trophy for the second time ever with a 3–2 victory over Leones Negros UdeG.

This edition was played by 20 teams, first with a group stage and later a knock-out stage.

== Group stage ==
Group A

| Pos | Team | Pld | W | D | L | GF | GA | GD | Pts | Qualification |
|---|---|---|---|---|---|---|---|---|---|---|
| 1 | Toluca FC (A) | 8 | 6 | 0 | 2 | 11 | 8 | +3 | 12 | Advances to the next phase |
| 2 | Club América | 8 | 3 | 4 | 1 | 10 | 6 | +4 | 10 | |
| 3 | Atlas FC | 8 | 4 | 2 | 2 | 15 | 12 | +3 | 10 | |
| 4 | Irapuato F.C. | 8 | 1 | 3 | 4 | 12 | 17 | −5 | 5 | |
| 5 | Pumas UNAM | 8 | 0 | 3 | 5 | 8 | 13 | −5 | 3 | |

(A) Advance to a further round

Results

| Home \ Away | AMÉ | ATL | IRA | UNM | TOL |
|---|---|---|---|---|---|
| América | | 2–1 | 2–2 | 1–0 | 3–0 |
| Atlas | 0–0 | | 4–2 | 1–0 | 2–1 |
| Irapuato | 0–0 | 3–4 | | 2–1 | 1–2 |
| UNAM | 1–1 | 3–3 | 2–2 | | 0–1 |
| Toluca | 2–1 | 1–0 | 2–0 | 2–1 | |

Legend: Blue = home team win; Yellow = draw; Red = away team win.

Group B

| Pos | Team | Pld | W | D | L | GF | GA | GD | Pts | Qualification |
|---|---|---|---|---|---|---|---|---|---|---|
| 1 | U. de G. (A) | 8 | 5 | 1 | 2 | 17 | 11 | +6 | 11 | Advances to the next phase |
| 2 | Santos Laguna | 8 | 3 | 4 | 1 | 7 | 6 | +1 | 10 | |
| 3 | Tampico Madero | 8 | 4 | 1 | 3 | 14 | 11 | +3 | 9 | |
| 4 | Atlético Morelia | 8 | 2 | 3 | 3 | 13 | 14 | −1 | 7 | |
| 5 | Puebla F.C. | 8 | 1 | 1 | 6 | 7 | 16 | −9 | 3 | |

(A) Advance to a further round

Results

| Home \ Away | MOR | PUE | SLA | TAM | UDG |
|---|---|---|---|---|---|
| Morelia | | 1–2 | 1–1 | 4–1 | 2–1 |
| Puebla | 1–1 | | 0–1 | 0–1 | 1–2 |
| Santos Laguna | 1–1 | 2–1 | | 2–0 | 0–0 |
| Tampico Madero | 2–0 | 5–2 | 2–2 | | 4–1 |
| U. de G. | 5–3 | 3–0 | 3–0 | 2–1 | |

Legend: Blue = home team win; Yellow = draw; Red = away team win.

Group C

| Pos | Team | Pld | W | D | L | GF | GA | GD | Pts | Qualification |
|---|---|---|---|---|---|---|---|---|---|---|
| 1 | Atlético Potosino (A) | 8 | 4 | 2 | 2 | 11 | 9 | +2 | 10 | Advances to the next phase |
| 2 | Atlante F.C. | 8 | 4 | 1 | 3 | 12 | 8 | +4 | 9 | |
| 3 | Guadalajara | 8 | 3 | 3 | 2 | 10 | 8 | +2 | 9 | |
| 4 | Necaxa | 8 | 3 | 0 | 5 | 10 | 14 | −4 | 6 | |
| 5 | Tigres UANL | 8 | 1 | 4 | 3 | 8 | 12 | −4 | 6 | |

(A) Advance to a further round

Results

| Home \ Away | ATE | GUA | NEC | POT | UNL |
|---|---|---|---|---|---|
| Atlante | | 0–3 | 2–0 | 3–0 | 3–0 |
| Guadalajara | 0–2 | | 3–4 | 0–0 | 1–1 |
| Necaxa | 2–1 | 0–1 | | 0–1 | 2–3 |
| Atlético Potosino | 3–1 | 1–2 | 2–0 | | 3–2 |
| UANL | 0–0 | 0–0 | 1–2 | 1–1 | |

Legend: Blue = home team win; Yellow = draw; Red = away team win.

Group D

| Pos | Team | Pld | W | D | L | GF | GA | GD | Pts | Qualification |
|---|---|---|---|---|---|---|---|---|---|---|
| 1 | Cruz Azul (A) | 8 | 4 | 1 | 3 | 17 | 11 | +6 | 9 | Advances to the next phase |
| 2 | Tecos UAG | 8 | 4 | 1 | 3 | 16 | 12 | +4 | 9 | |
| 3 | Correcaminos UAT | 8 | 4 | 0 | 4 | 12 | 10 | +2 | 8 | |
| 4 | C.F. Monterrey | 8 | 3 | 2 | 3 | 11 | 14 | −3 | 8 | |
| 5 | Cobras | 8 | 3 | 0 | 5 | 10 | 19 | −9 | 6 | |

(A) Advance to a further round

Results

| Home \ Away | CJU | CAZ | MON | UAG | UAT |
|---|---|---|---|---|---|
| Cobras Ciudad Juárez | | 0–3 | 2–0 | 2–5 | 2–0 |
| Cruz Azul | 5–1 | | 0–0 | 0–1 | 2–1 |
| Monterrey | 3–1 | 4–3 | | 0–0 | 2–1 |
| UAG | 1–2 | 2–4 | 4–2 | | 3–0 |
| UAT | 2–0 | 2–0 | 3–0 | 2–1 | |

Legend: Blue = home team win; Yellow = draw; Red = away team win.

== Final stage ==
Semifinals; From November 16 to November 30
A | Toluca | 2 | 2 | 4
D | Cruz Azul | 1 | 2 | 3
C | Atlético Potosino | 1 | 0 | 1
B | U. de G. | 1 | 2 | 3

Final; January 11 and January 25
A | Toluca | 1 | 2 | 3
B | U. de G. | 1 | 1 | 2

== Semifinals ==
=== First leg ===
November 16, 1988

| Cruz Azul | 1 – 2 | Toluca |

Estadio Azteca, Mexico DF

November 16, 1988

| Atlético Potosino | 1 – 1 | U. de G. |

Estadio Plan de San Luis, San Luis Potosí City

=== Second leg ===
November 30, 1988

| Toluca | 2 – 2 | Cruz Azul |
|---|---|---|
| Ricardo Ferretti 72' (pen.), 79' | | Horacio García 15'; Rubens Navarro 21' |

Estadio Nemesio Díez, Toluca

Toluca advanced to final aggregate 4-3

November 30, 1988

| U. de G. | 2 – 0 | Atlético Potosino |
|---|---|---|
| Víctor Rodríguez 70'; Daniel Guzmán 81' |

Estadio Jalisco, Guadalajara

U. de G. advanced to final aggregate 3-1

== Final ==
=== First leg ===
January 11, 1989

| U. de G. | 1 – 1 | Toluca |
|---|---|---|
| Daniel Guzmán 25' | | Ricardo Ferretti 38' (pen.) |

Estadio Jalisco, Guadalajara

=== Second leg ===
January 25, 1989

| Toluca | 2 – 1 (a.e.t.) | U. de G. |
|---|---|---|
| Washington Olivera 90+3'; Jorge Rodríguez 94' | | Byron Pérez 48' |

Estadio Nemesio Díez, Toluca

The match was suspended at 111' due to U de G only 6 players left, result stood
Toluca Won the cup aggregate 3-2

Copa México 1988-89 Winners

2nd title
