= Juan Tuñas =

Cuban footballer

Personal information
- Full name: Juan Tuñas Bajeneta
- Date of birth: 17 July 1917
- Place of birth: Havana, Cuba
- Date of death: 4 April 2011 (aged 93)
- Place of death: Mexico City, Mexico
- Position: Striker

Senior career*
Years	Team	Apps	(Gls)
- Centro Gallego
–1941	Juventud Asturiana		
1941–1945	Real Club España	16+	(28)

International career
- Cuba
- * Club domestic league appearances and goals

Juan Tuñas Bajeneta, also known as Romperredes (17 July 1917 – 4 April 2011) was a Cuban footballer.

== Club career ==
He played for the Cuban clubs Juventud Asturiana and Centro Gallego. After helping lead Cuba to the quarterfinals in their only World Cup appearance, he moved to Mexico and played for Real Club España, winning two Liga Mayor (Mexico First Division) championships there, in 1942 and 1945.

== International career ==
Tuñas was a member of the Cuba national football team that played at the 1938 FIFA World Cup in France, winning the game to Romania (according to the official FIFA match report ).

== Personal life ==
His nickname Romperredes means "net-breaker", after his powerful shots on goal with him once shooting a hole in a goalnet. In 2005, he received the Gloria del Deporte Cubano Award in Havana. After his retirement he resided in Mexico City and was the last surviving member of Cuba's squad from the 1938 World Cup. He died in April 2011.
