= Toluca–Tenango and San Juan Railways =

The Ferrocarriles Toluca a Tenango y San Juan (Toluca–Tenango and San Juan Railways) was a narrow gauge railway in the State of Mexico, Mexico. The railway company owned two lines, from the state capital Toluca to San Juan de las Huertas (10 mi / 16 km), and to Atlatlahuca via Tenango (19 mi / 29 km). Built from 1884 to 1903, the lines existed into the early 1940s when they were dismantled. The locomotives and cars of the lines were painted green, which gave the railway the nickname El Perico (the parakeet).

== History ==
Toluca, the capital of the State of Mexico, was mostly a center of agriculture in the 19th century. When the first railway, the Ferrocarril México a Toluca, reached the city on September 4, 1882, the need arose to bring agricultural products directly to the new transport hub. One local politician, Agustín del Río, planned to serve this public need by construction of a horse/mule tramway. He did not have the necessary money to build the line, and sought subsidies from the federal government, and financial support from local entrepreneurs. Arcadio Henkel, a local businessman, and Eduardo Viñas, a lawyer, stepped in and the three men received a concession in 1883 to build and operate a railway line in 3 ft (914 mm) gauge from Toluca to San Juan de las Huertas, with extensions from there to Temascaltepec, Sultepec, and Villa del Valle, then founded as the Ferrocarril Toluca a San Juan (Toluca and San Juan Railway). Construction started in 1884, and soon reached the Hacienda La Huerta via Zinacantepec, about 12 km from Toluca. The hacienda was owned by Henkel, and he gave land to the railway to build a station and loading facilities for its agricultural products. Arcadio Henkel died on November 28, 1884, and his family, wife Francisca Zea, and five children Adolfo, Alberto, Aurelia, Eduardo, and Luz, inherited his shares in the railroad, as well as the family assets in the region. In March 1889, the Henkel family bought Agustín del Río's and Eduardo Viñas's shares and became the primary owner of the railway.

By 1889, the federal government requested that the line be operated by steam locomotives, instead of animal power, but the city of Toluca did not want steam locomotives in the Avenida Independencia, on which the line was laid. The Toluca station of the narrow gauge railway now served as the terminus for the steam trains, and the horse tramway between this and the main railway station remained as shuttle. Freight cars were carried on the horse tramway as well. In 1891, the line was finally extended by another 3.7 km to San Juan de las Huertas, for a total length of 15.721 km. The planned extensions to Temascaltepec, Sultepec, and Villa del Valle were never built.

The Henkel family now sought to build another railway, serving the area south of Toluca, and in 1891, they received a concession for a line from Toluca to Tenango. For this line, a new company was founded, the Ferrocarril Toluca a Tenango. The terminus in Toluca was at Avenida Independencia, where a track connection to the existing line was installed. However, the new line could not reach the steam train terminus of the San Juan line. The transfer of cars between the lines, as well as the connection to the mainline railway station was handled by the existing horse tramway. Construction started in 1895, after funds were secured. The new line reached Metepec in the same year, and was opened to Tenango, via Mexicaltzingo (then spelled Mexicalcingo) and Calimaya on September 12, 1897. The Tenango line had a length of 24.2 km. Stations were built in Toluca, San Francisco, Metepec, Mexicaltzingo, Calimaya, San Agustín (today Santiaguito Cuaxustenco), and Tenango.

In 1902, the Henkel family received a concession for an extension from Tenango to Atlatlahuca, 5.3 km in length, and founded the Ferrocarril Tenango a Santa María Atlatlahuca to build the line. The extension was open by March 1904. Trains on the extension operated to and from Toluca. The three railway companies were merged into the Ferrocarriles Toluca a Tenango y San Juan in 1906. However, in the Official Guide of the Railways, the two lines were listed as separate entities throughout their history.

The Mexican Revolution brought first new revenue to the railways, the transport of military equipment and soldiers. However, by 1914, the line to San Juan had to shut down completely, as well as the extension from Tenango to Atlatlahuca. Both sections were reopened by February 1921. By 1928, an autobus was bought and some trips to San Juan were operated by bus. The bus operation proved successful, and in 1929 a frequently served bus line between Toluca and Mexicaltzingo was inaugurated. By then, the San Juan line was fully operated by trains again. However, in January 1935, passenger trains on both lines were discontinued, and a bus line to Zinacantepec was inaugurated that operated in 20-minute intervals during the day. Every two hours, trips were extended to San Juan, providing more trips per day than on the steam railway. Hourly bus service was then operated between Toluca and Tenango. Freight was still carried by steam trains on both lines. The extension from Tenango to Atlatlahuca was abandoned. Finally, in June 1941, the line to San Juan, and in summer 1943 also the line to Tenango were abandoned. The rails were sold to Nazi Germany.

== Passenger operations ==
In March 1904, the San Juan line was served by four daily mixed trains, two in the morning hours and two in the afternoon. On Fridays and Sundays, no freight was carried and a fifth pair of trains ran around midday. Mixed trains needed about 70 minutes, passenger trains about 60 minutes to cover the line. The Tenango line, with the newly opened extension to Atlatlahuca, was served by two daily passenger trains to/from Atlatlahuca, two daily passenger trains to/from Tenango, and on Mondays and Fridays by three additional mixed trains each way between Toluca and Tenango. Travel time to Atlatlahuca was 75 minutes, to Tenango 55 minutes. Mixed trains needed 65 to 95 minutes to Tenango. By May 1908, the additional mixed trains to Tenango ran Mondays only, and were reduced to two trains each way. By February 1913, the first train to San Juan, and the last train from San Juan were not carrying freight anymore and ran as passenger trains daily.

After the restrictions during the time of the revolutionary war, only the line from Toluca to Tenango was operated. The February 1915 schedule offered the two additional mixed trains to Tenango also on Fridays again, and only on Fridays two more trains were operated between Toluca and Mexicaltzingo only, with a travel time of 35 minutes up and 30 minutes down.

The schedule of February 1921, after reopening of the lines in full extent, saw a return to the 1913 schedule on the San Juan line, and on the Tenango line one daily train to Atlatlahuca, three daily trains to Tenango, and two additional trains on Mondays and three on Fridays to Mexicaltzingo were offered. By August 1923, the second train to Atlatlahuca had returned. The only change in the following years was that by January 1926, the last daily train from San Juan to Toluca was once again operated as mixed train, but the first down train was now a passenger train with shorter running time.

The introduction of autobuses lead to new schedules. The July 1928 schedule for the San Juan line offered only two daily passenger trains, and two daily bus roundtrips. By January 1930, the two bus roundtrips were again replaced by passenger trains, but one of them was only offered Fridays and Sundays. On the Tenango line, the April 1929 schedule, after inauguration of the bus line to Mexicaltzingo, still had two daily trains to Atlatlahuca, and three more to Tenango, but no additional trains to Mexicaltzingo anymore. However, the timetable effective January 10, 1930, offered eight daily roundtrips to Tenango on top of the two to Atlatlahuca. Passenger rail service on both lines ceased by January 1935, and was completely replaced by buses.

== See also ==
- List of Mexican railroads
