= Zacatepec F.C. =

Zacatepec
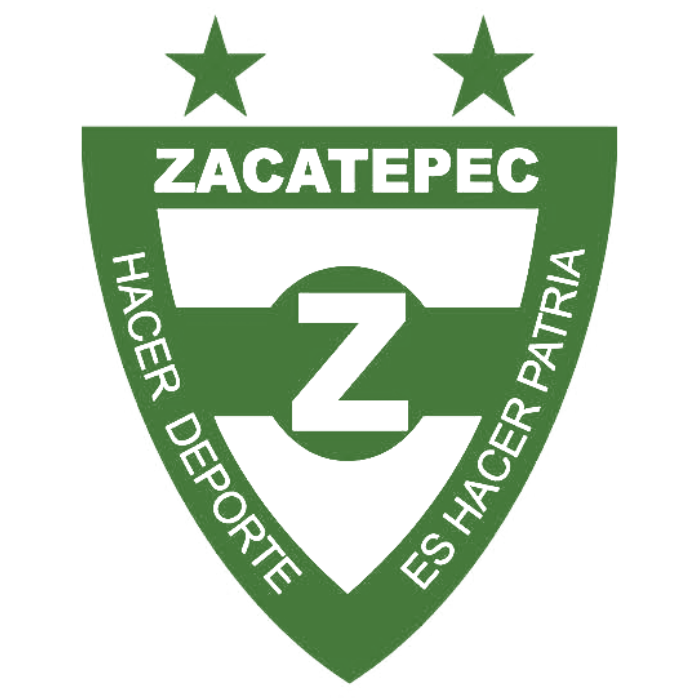
- Full name: Zacatepec Fútbol Club
- Nickname: Los Cañeros (The Sugarcane Growers)
- Short name: ZAC
- Founded: 1948; 78 years ago (as Club Social y Deportivo Zacatepec); 21 July 2024; 2 years ago (refounded as Zacatepec Fútbol Club)
- Ground: Estadio Mariano Matamoros
- Capacity: 16,000
- Owner: Jorge Enrique Núñez
- Chairman: Jorge Enrique Núñez
- Manager: Rowan Vargas
- League: Liga Premier (Primera Premier)
- 2025–26: Regular phase: 3rd of 14 (Group II); Final phase: Quarter-finals
Home colours	Away colours

Zacatepec Fútbol Club is a professional football club based in Xochitepec, Morelos. The club competes in Liga Premier (Primera Premier), the third level of Mexican football, and plays its home matches at Estadio Mariano Matamoros. Founded in 1948 as Club Social y Deportivo Zacatepec by workers of the sugar mill Emiliano Zapata. Throughout its history, the club was renamed as Promotora Deportiva Zacatepec SC, Zacatepec 1948, Zacatepec Siglo XXI and Club Atlético Zacatepec. The club was refounded in 2024 under its current name. Nicknamed Cañeros, their traditional colors are white and green (from sugar and sugarcane, respectively).

In domestic competitions, Zacatepec FC has won two Primera División titles, two Copa México titles and one Campeón de Campeones.

The manager of Zacatepec during the 1950s was Ignacio Trelles, a former professional Mexican football player who became head coach of the Mexico national team in the 1962 FIFA World Cup in Chile and 1966 FIFA World Cup in England.

== History ==
The club dates back to the early 1920s and was formed by local farmers and co-op members that operated the local sugar mill.

It was not until 1948 when Rodrigo Ampudia del Valle along with the sugar mill's coop membership, including the mill's superintendent and its chief chemist Gustavo de la Parra, founded Club Social y Deportivo Zacatepec who from its foundation sought to play in the Primera División de México. A few years later, the club would go on to win important things in the national level and international level.

It was in 1951 when future manager Ignacio Trelles took over the club. In the 1951 Segunda División final they won, earning a promotion to the Primera División de México, taking over the spot left by Club San Sebastián de León who would never again return to the top division.

The club finished runner-up in 1953. In 1955, the club won its first league title, becoming the first club in the state of Morelos to achieve that, which made the locals celebrate in the streets thing that had no been seen before. The following year the club won the 1956–57 Copa México against León for the first time.

The club won the 1957 league title just ahead of Toluca once ageing under the care of Ignacio Trelles who would go on to win titles with other clubs in the league becoming one of the best managers in the league history. The following tournament the club finished third, 4 points behind runner-up León and 6 points behind Guadalajara who would go on to win the next 6 out of 7 titles from 1958 to 1965. The club would also go on to lose the 1957–58 Copa México to León.

In the following years the club struggled, finishing 10th in 1959–60 and 6th in 1960–61, and it was finally in 1961 when the club played its worst tournament, finishing last and being relegated to the Segunda División de México.

That club from the 1950s was one of the most successful in the club's history. The club played some importation international friendlies in the 1950s against some of the best clubs from around the world. The club defeated Nacional who had won the Campeón Mundial de Clubes and would also go on to beat Manchester United in a friendly game.

The club started the 1960s playing the top division but after a bad league tournament in 1961 the club was relegated to the Segunda División de México where after one year in the lower league the club was promoted after winning the 1962–63 tournament and was once again in the Primera División de México, taking over the spot left by Jaibos Tampico Madero. The club struggle in its first years back and it was in their third year when the club once again finished last in the competition and was relegated to the Segunda División de México. The club allied in the second division from 1965 to 1970 when the club won its second Segunda División title and earning the promotion along with Puebla who had one a promotional play-off series with four other clubs that year in order to increase the numbers of clubs in the league.

The club started the 1970s once again in the first division; in the 1970–71 tournament the club finished tied for second in Group Corsairs 5 points behind the group leader and league runner-up Toluca. In the 1971–72 tournament the club finished fifth in Group A 15 points behind leader and league champion Cruz Azul. In the 1972–73 tournament, the club just barely avoided relegation and finished four points ahead of Pachuca. The club struggled the following year finish in eighth in group 8 Group A once again avoiding relegation. In the 1974–75 tournament, the club's struggles continued once again finishing in the bottom five. In the 1975–76 tournament, the club once again avoided relegation finishing six points ahead of Atlante, who was relegated. It was finally in the 1976–77 tournament when the club could not avoid relegation after having a bad year, finishing with 27 points—fewest in the league.

It didn't take long for the club to return to the main stage after winning the 1977–78 Segunda División title and its third in its history. The club had a good year in the 1978–79 tournament qualifying to the play-off tournament, a short tournament where they finished last. In the 1979–80 tournament, club once again qualify after finishing first in group 4 with 44 points, but would again have a bad play-off tournament. And so the 1970s were over having the club struggles at the beginning of the decade and finishing with back-to-back play-off berths.

The club started the 1980s in the Primera División. In the 1980–81 tournament the club qualified to the playoff stage with 42 points by means of 17 wins, 8 draws, and 13 defeats. In the play-offs the club played out of group 1 where they finished second behind Cruz Azul who would go on to lose the final against the winner of group 2 Pumas UNAM. In the 1981–82 tournament, the club once again qualified this time playing a series which they lost to Deportivo Neza 2–3 after two matches. In the 1982–83 tournament, the club tied for the worst record in the league with Atlético Morelia both only earning 30 points on 38 games. A relegation match was held where after two matches Atlético Morelia managed to keep the category winning the series after a penalty shootout. The club would play for the fifth time in the Segunda División, but it would only take them one year to return winning the 1983-84 Segunda División championship. After their 5th promotion the club would lose the category again in the 1984–85 tournament, being the last time the club played in the Primera División.

After bouncing between the second and third tiers of Mexican football during the 2000s, Zacatepec finally found stability in 2013 when it was announced that their home stadium would receive a multimillion-dollar renovation. After the 2017 Clausura season, Zacatepec owners decided to place the club in brief hiatus while the club would be restructured. Shortly after, franchise owner of Coras de Tepic José Luis Higuera received temporary permission to move his franchise from Tepic, Nayarit to Zacatepec for the football year along with temporary use of naming rights.

In the Apertura 2019, Zacatepec became runners-up in the Liga de Ascenso de México, after being defeated by Alebrijes de Oaxaca in the final series.

On June 26, 2020, Atlético Zacatepec was dissolved due to financial and economic problems and its franchise was relocated to Morelia, Michoacán to make room for Atlético Morelia, after Monarcas Morelia, a team from the Primera División, was relocated to Mazatlán, Sinaloa and renamed as Mazatlán F.C. in that same year. Almost immediately, a parallel project was created to continue football in the city. The new team was called Lobos Zacatepec and played in the Liga de Balompié Mexicano after the relocation of the reserves team of Lobos BUAP, a parallel league to those organized by the Federación Mexicana de Fútbol (FMF). However, the club arose with financial and institutional problems, for which it was dissolved by the league in November 2020.

In May 2023, Escorpiones F.C., a team from the Liga Premier – Serie A was relocated from Cuernavaca to Zacatepec due to the lack of fan support in its original city, returning football to Zacatepec after three years of absence.

While new franchises were established in Zacatepec, a local project, known as Selva Cañera, had consolidated itself in the Tercera División de México, the last category of Mexican professional football. This team was managed by the "Promotora Deportiva Zacatepec", an independent organization that had retained the rights to the name and brand of the team, however, due to the lack of government support in Zacatepec, this team had played in different towns according to the support offers offered by the various town councils.

In July 2024, Escorpiones F.C. and the Promotora Deportiva Zacatepec reached an agreement to return Zacatepec to professional football, the team was refounded as Zacatepec F.C. and plays in the Liga Premier – Serie A since the 2024–25 season.

However, Zacatepec's return to its hometown was only effective for six months, because in December 2024 Atlante was relocated from Mexico City to Zacatepec. Atlante's refusal to share the Estadio Agustín Coruco Díaz led to the sugarcane team being forced to relocate and reestablish its home field in Xochitepec, located about 25 kilometers from its original stadium.

== Stadium ==
The Agustín "Coruco" Díaz stadium is the home of Zacatepec. It was founded in November 1954. It was inaugurated by then president of Mexico Adolfo López Mateos. The stadium is nicknamed la selva cañera (the sugarcane jungle) due to Zacatepec's humid weather conditions.

=== Motto ===
Club Zacatepec's motto is "Hacer Deporte es Hacer Patria" which means doing sports is to be a patriot.

On March 23, 2013, the governor of Morelos announced the team would return to the Liga de Ascenso de México in August 2013, taking the place of Irapuato. Zacatepec was relegated just after its second season in the Ascenso MX, but bought Cruz Azul Hidalgo and relocated it to the city to be able to remain in the Ascenso MX for the Apertura 2014.

== Past kits ==
=== Home ===
- Home Kit white shirt with a green strip that runs across the chest with green shorts and white socks.
- Away Kit green shirt with a white strip that runs across the chest with white shorts and green socks.
- Third Kit white shirt with green strip that runs across chest white shorts and white socks.

1948	1955	1965	1970	1997	1980	2002	2003	2010

=== Away ===
1948	1955	1965	1970	1980	1996	2002	2003	2010

== Names ==
Club Social y Deportivo Zacatepec: (1948–2003, 2006) Original name of the club at its foundation.

Promotora Deportiva Zacatepec SC: (2007–2013) Name of the club founded by fans after the transformation of the previous Zacatepec into Socio Águila. It replaced the previous club until 2013, the year of Zacatepec's return, after which it continued to exist locally.

Zacatepec 1948: (2013–2014) Name assumed after the acquisition of the sporting rights of Irapuato.

Zacatepec Siglo XXI: (2014–2017) Name assumed after the acquisition of the sporting rights of Cruz Azul Hidalgo.

Club Atlético Zacatepec: (2017–2020) Name assumed after acquisition by Coras.

Zacatepec FC: (2024–present) Name assumed after the rebranding of Escorpiones Zacatepec F.C.

== Season to season ==
Season	Division	Place	Notes
1950–51	Segunda División de México	1st	Promoted
1951–52	Primera División de México	9th	
1952–53	Primera División de México	2nd	
1953–54	Primera División de México	9th	
1954–55	Primera División de México	1st	First Title
1955–56	Primera División de México	7th	
1956–57	Primera División de México	12th	
1957–58	Primera División de México	1st	Second Title
1958–59	Primera División de México	3rd	
1959–60	Primera División de México	10th	
1960–61	Primera División de México	6th	
1961–62	Primera División de México	14th	1st Relegation
1962–63	Segunda División de México	1st	Champion
1963–64	Primera División de México	6th	
1964–65	Primera División de México	13th	
1965–66	Primera División de México	16th	2nd Relegation
1966–67	Segunda División de México	?	
1967–68	Segunda División de México	?	
1968–69	Segunda División de México	?	
1969–70	Segunda de México	1st	Champion
1970–71	Primera División de México	2nd G.1	
1971–72	Primera División de México	5th G.1	
1972–73	Primera División de México	8th G.1	
1973–74	Primera División de México	8th G.1	

Season	Division	Place	Notes
1974–75	Primera División de México	8th G.2	
1975–76	Primera División de México	4th G.3	
1976–77	Primera División de México	5th G.2	3rd Relegation
1977–78	Segunda División de México	1st	Champion
1978–79	Primera División de México	2nd G.4	
1979–80	Primera División de México	1st G.4	
1980–81	Primera División de México	2nd G.3	
1981–82	Primera División de México	1st G.1	
1982–83	Primera División de México	5th G.3	4th Relegation
1983–84	Segunda División de México	1st	Champion
1984–85	Primera División de México	5th G.4	5th Relegation
1985–86	Segunda División de México		
1986–87	Segunda División de México		
1987–88	Segunda División de México		
1988–89	Segunda División de México		
1989–90	Segunda División de México		
1990–91	Segunda División de México		
1991–92	Segunda División de México		
1992–93	Segunda División de México		Lost Promotion
1993–94	Segunda División de México		
1994–95	Primera División 'A' de México		
1995–96	Primera División 'A' de México		
1996–97	Primera División 'A' de México		
1997–98	Primera División 'A' de México		

Season	Division	Place	Copa MX or Notes
1998–99	Primera División 'A' de México		
1999–00	Primera División 'A' de México		
2000–01	Primera División 'A' de México		
2001–02	Primera División 'A' de México		
2002–03	Primera División 'A' de México		1st defunct
2003–04			
2004–05			
2005–06			
2006–07	Primera División 'A' de México		Return
Apertura 2007	Tercera División de México		
Clausura 2008	Tercera División de México		
Apertura 2008	Tercera División de México		
Clausura 2009	Tercera División de México		
Apertura 2009	Tercera División de México		
Clausura 2010	Tercera División de México		
Apertura 2010	Tercera División de México		
Clausura 2011	Tercera División de México		
Apertura 2011	Segunda División de México		
Clausura 2012	Segunda División de México		
Apertura 2012	Segunda División de México		
Clausura 2013	Segunda División de México		
Apertura 2013	Liga de Ascenso de México	15th	
Clausura 2014	Liga de Ascenso de México	15th	Relegated but bought Cruz Azul Hidalgo
Apertura 2014	Liga de Ascenso de México	8th	

Season	Division	Place	Copa MX or Notes
Clausura 2015	Liga de Ascenso de México	13th	
Apertura 2015	Liga de Ascenso de México	14th	
Clausura 2016	Liga de Ascenso de México	14th	
Apertura 2016	Liga de Ascenso de México	3rd (quarterfinals)	
Clausura 2017	Liga de Ascenso de México	7th (quarterfinals)	Group stage
Apertura 2017	Liga de Ascenso de México	4th (quarterfinals)	Round of 16 Took over Coras Tepic
Clausura 2018	Liga de Ascenso de México	4th (quarterfinals)	Semifinals
Apertura 2018	Liga de Ascenso de México	11th	Round of 16
Clausura 2019	Liga de Ascenso de México	3rd (quarterfinals)	Round of 16
Apertura 2019	Liga de Ascenso de México	5th (runners-up)	Group Stage
Clausura 2020	Liga de Ascenso de México	4th	2nd Defunct

- Has played 27 Primera División tournaments last in 1985.
- Has played 22 Segunda División tournaments last in Clausura 2013.
- Has played 13 Liga de Ascenso tournaments last in Clausura 2020
- Has played 8 Tercera División tournaments last in Clausura 2011.

== Honours ==
Domestic
Type	Competition	Titles	Seasons	Runners-up
Top level FMF	Primera División	2	1954–55, 1957–58	1952–53
Top level FMF	Copa México	2	1956–57, 1958–59	1957–58, 1970–71, 1971–72
Top level FMF	Campeón de Campeones	1	1958	1955, 1957, 1959
Lower levels FMF	Ascenso MX	0	–	Ver–1998, Inv–1999, Ape–2019
Lower levels FMF	Segunda División	5	1950–51, 1962–63, 1969–70, 1977–78, 1983–84	1967–68, 1968–69, 1991–92
Lower levels FMF	Copa México Segunda División	1	1966–67	1962–63
Lower levels FMF	Campeón de Campeones Segunda División	2	1963, 1967	1970

Notes

- record

== Players ==
=== Current squad ===
As of 5 September 2026

Note: Flags indicate national team as defined under FIFA eligibility rules; some limited exceptions apply. Players may hold more than one non-FIFA nationality.

No.	Pos.	Nation	Player
1	GK	MEX	Sebastián Rivas
3	DF	MEX	Sebastián Vega
4	DF	MEX	Óscar García
5	DF	MEX	Yair Fonseca
6	MF	MEX	Mario Huerta
7	DF	MEX	Diego Choreño
8	MF	MEX	Enrique Núñez
9	FW	ARG	Lucas Cantón
11	FW	MEX	Felipe Mena
12	DF	MEX	Jesús Castañeda
13	DF	MEX	Alonso Razo
14	FW	MEX	Christopher Brito
15	MF	MEX	Miguel Seseña
16	MF	MEX	Dylan Rodríguez

No.	Pos.	Nation	Player
17	MF	MEX	Mateo Vargas
19	DF	MEX	Ángel Sánchez
20	DF	MEX	Jorge Montes de Oca
21	GK	MEX	Jason Ávalos
22	DF	USA	Bogart Roca
23	MF	MEX	Alejandro Castañeda
24	FW	MEX	Gustavo Aviña
25	GK	USA	Eric Carvajal
26	FW	MEX	Edwin Ramírez
27	MF	MEX	César Rubio
29	MF	USA	Bryan Cisneros
30	MF	MEX	Edwin Mendoza
31	FW	ECU	Jahir Caicedo
33	MF	MEX	Alejandro Sosa

== Managers ==
- (Mexico) Ignacio Trelles (1950–51), (1954–58)
- (Mexico) Guillermo Huerta (2013–2014)
- (Mexico) Adrián Martínez (Interim) (2014)
- (Mexico) Ignacio Rodríguez (2014–2015)
- (Mexico) Joel Sánchez (2015)
- (Mexico) Carlos Gutiérrez (2015–2017)
- (Mexico) Marcelo Michel Leaño (2017–2018)
- (Mexico) Alberto Clark (2018)
- (Argentina) Ricardo Valiño (2018–2020)
- (Mexico) Miguel Gutiérrez (2024)
- (Mexico) Alfredo González Tahuilán (2025)
- (Mexico) Rowan Vargas (2025–)

== Reserves ==
=== Selva Cañera ===
The team competes in the Group VIII of the Liga TDP, and also participated in the Liga de Nuevos Talentos of the Segunda División de México, finishing as champions in the Clausura 2014, defeating Santos de Soledad 7–3 on aggregate. In the Apertura 2014, it finished as runners-up, losing to Mineros de Fresnillo 7–0 on aggregate.

=== Zacatepec "B" ===
The team participated in the 2019–20 season of the Torneo de Filiales de la Liga TDP, it was not eligible for promotion.
