= 1956–57 Mexican Primera División season =

14th professional season of the top-flight football league in Mexico

Primera División de México
- Season: 1956–57
- Champions: Guadalajara (1st title)
- Relegated: Monterrey
- Matches: 156
- Goals: 451 (2.89 per match)

Statistics of the Primera División de México for the 1956–57 season.

== Overview ==
Monterrey was promoted to Primera División.

The season was contested by 13 teams, and Guadalajara won the championship.

Monterrey was relegated to Segunda División.

Due to economical problems Puebla advised the league that the club would not be playing next season and the club would return for the 1957-58 season.

=== Teams ===
Location of the 1956-57 Primera División teams

Team	City	Stadium
América	Mexico City	Olímpico Universitario
Atlante	Mexico City	Ciudad de los Deportes
Atlas	Guadalajara, Jalisco	Parque Oblatos
Cuautla	Cuautla, Morelos	El Almeal
Guadalajara	Guadalajara, Jalisco	Parque Oblatos
Irapuato	Irapuato, Guanajuato	Revolución
León	León, Guanajuato	La Martinica
Monterrey	Monterrey, Nuevo León	Tecnológico
Necaxa	Mexico City	Olímpico Universitario
Oro	Guadalajara, Jalisco	Parque Oblatos
C.D. Tampico	Tampico, Tamaulipas	Tampico
Toluca	Toluca, State of Mexico	Héctor Barraza
Zacatepec	Zacatepec, Morelos	Campo del Ingenio

== League standings ==
Pos	Team	Pld	W	D	L	GF	GA	GD	Pts	Qualification or relegation
1	Guadalajara	24	17	2	5	47	22	+25	36	Champions
2	Toluca	24	11	8	5	45	20	+25	30	
3	León	24	11	8	5	45	21	+24	30	
4	Atlante	24	11	8	5	46	27	+19	30	
5	Irapuato	24	12	2	10	38	36	+2	26	
6	Atlas	24	9	7	8	35	35	0	25	
7	Oro	24	9	5	10	38	40	−2	23	
8	Cuautla	24	10	2	12	28	38	−10	22	
9	Necaxa	24	7	7	10	30	34	−4	21	
10	Tampico	24	7	6	11	27	46	−19	20	
11	América	24	5	8	11	25	44	−19	18	
12	Zacatepec	24	5	6	13	24	42	−18	16	
13	Monterrey	24	4	7	13	23	46	−23	15	Relegated

Source: RSSSF

1956–57 winners

1st title

== Results ==
Home \ Away	AME	ATE	ATS	CUA	GDL	IRA	LEO	MTY	NEC	ORO	TAM	TOL	ZAC
América	—	0–1	1–1	2–1	1–3	0–3	1–5	5–1	1–2	2–1	0–3	2–2	2–0
Atlante	2–0	—	5–3	3–0	1–2	2–1	1–1	5–0	4–3	0–2	8–0	3–3	1–1
Atlas	1–1	1–1	—	1–1	0–2	0–3	2–0	2–0	1–1	1–2	1–3	0–1	4–2
Cuautla	0–1	2–0	0–2	—	1–2	3–1	1–0	2–1	3–0	1–2	1–0	2–0	1–0
Guadalajara	7–0	2–0	0–2	3–1	—	1–0	2–2	3–1	1–0	2–1	1–2	0–0	2–0
Irapuato	0–0	0–1	0–2	3–0	2–1	—	3–2	3–2	3–1	1–0	6–2	0–4	1–0
León	2–2	1–1	4–1	0–0	2–1	1–0	—	2–0	1–1	4–0	6–0	1–0	4–0
Monterrey	1–1	1–1	1–1	2–0	0–4	1–2	0–3	—	1–2	2–0	2–1	1–1	2–0
Necaxa	2–1	0–2	2–2	2–0	0–2	1–0	1–1	1–1	—	4–0	2–2	0–0	0–1
Oro	2–0	1–1	0–2	5–1	2–3	6–1	0–1	1–1	2–1	—	3–1	1–1	3–3
Tampico	1–1	1–0	3–1	1–3	0–1	1–3	1–1	1–1	2–1	1–1	—	0–0	1–0
Toluca	2–0	0–1	1–2	6–1	3–0	3–0	1–0	3–0	2–3	5–1	2–0	—	4–1
Zacatepec	1–1	2–2	1–2	1–3	1–2	2–2	2–1	2–1	1–0	1–2	1–0	1–1	—

Updated to match(es) played on 17 January 1957. Source: RSSSF
Legend: Blue = home team win; Yellow = draw; Red = away team win.
