= Campeón de Campeones =

Association football competition in Mexico

- Organiser(s): Liga MX; Mexican Football Federation
- Founded: 1943; 83 years ago (Professional era)
- Region: Mexico
- Teams: 2
- Current champions: Cruz Azul (4th title)
- Most championships: América; Guadalajara (7 titles each)
- 2026 Campeón de Campeones

Campeón de Campeones (Champion of Champions) is a professional association football super cup in Mexico, contested by the champions of the Apertura and Clausura tournaments of the Liga MX. Until 1995, it was contested by the league and cup champions. Since 2018, the winners of the trophy have competed in the Campeones Cup facing the champions of the Major League Soccer of the United States.

The trophy has been contested in 52 editions, with the inaugural edition of the professional era played in 1943, and Marte was crowned the first champion. Eighteen clubs have won the title, the most successful clubs are América and Guadalajara with seven titles each, followed by León, Toluca, and Atlas with five titles each.

== History ==
=== Amateur era ===
The Campeón de Campeones was created in 1942, one edition was played corresponding to the amateur era of Mexican football. The trophy was contested by Real Club España the Liga Mayor champions and Atlante the Copa México champions of the 1941–42 season, with Atlante winning the trophy 5–4 on aggregate.

=== Professional era ===
The beginning of the professional era of the Campeón de Campeones was established in 1943. The trophy was presented by the president of Mexico at the time, Manuel Ávila Camacho. From 1942 to 1995 the tournament was contested between the Liga MX champions and the Copa MX champions. Traditionally the single match (with an exception in 1968 and 1988 when two matches were played) to determine the trophy winners was held at the end of the season at a stadium in Mexico City.

If a club won the league and cup titles of the same year, they were awarded the title Campeonísimo with an automatic awarding of the Campeón de Campeones trophy. To date this has only occurred on five occasions (León in 1949, Cruz Azul in 1969, Guadalajara in 1970, Puebla in 1990, and Necaxa in 1995).

After 1995 the league championship was split into two shorter seasons Apertura and Clausura. Then in 1997, the FMF canceled the cup tournament. Due to these changes, the Campeón de Campeones was postponed. The competition resumed in the 2002–03 season; however, this time it was contested between the champions of Apertura and Clausura. The competition was held four times and was placed on hiatus again from 2007 to 2014.

In 2012, an unofficial match was played between the Liga MX champions and the Ascenso MX champions, Leon beat Santos Laguna 2–0. In the 2013–14 season, the Liga MX stipulated that a Campeón de Campeones match should be contested between the champions of the Apertura 2013 and Copa MX Apertura 2013, but it was not officially disputed.

== Competition format ==
The format was changed to a single match at a neutral site, which is in the United States and shared with the Supercopa MX match, and the team with the higher aggregate table points across both Apertura and Clausura tournaments is declared the designated "home" team. In 2015, the Liga MX restarted the Campeón de Campeones with the match between Santos Laguna and América, the match was played at a neutral venue (Toyota Stadium in Frisco, Texas), that was the first edition of the competition that was played in the United States.

Similarly to the traditional tournament, if a team wins both the Apertura and Clausura seasons, the team is automatically awarded the Campeón de Campeones trophy. This has occurred twice, Atlas in 2022 for winning the 2021 Apertura and the 2022 Clausura. Club América in 2024 for winning the 2023 Apertura and the 2024 Clausura.

== Results ==
Ed.	Season	League champion	Score	Cup champion
Amateur era
1	1942	Real Club España	4–5	Atlante
Professional era
1	1943	Marte	1–0	Moctezuma
2	1944	Asturias	3–5	Real Club España
3	1945	Real Club España	3–0	Puebla
4	1946	Veracruz	2–3	Atlas
5	1947	Atlante	0–3	Moctezuma
6	1948	León	1–0	Veracruz
7	1949	León – champion automatically (Note: Trophy awarded automatically for winning the league and cup.)		
8	1950	Veracruz	1–3	Atlas
9	1951	Atlas	1–0	Atlante
10	1952	León	0–1	Atlante
11	1953	Tampico	3–0	Puebla
12	1954	Marte	1–0	América
13	1955	Zacatepec	2–3	América
14	1956	León	2–1	Toluca
15	1957	Guadalajara	2–1	Zacatepec
16	1958	Zacatepec	1–0	León
17	1959	Guadalajara	2–1	Zacatepec
18	1960	Guadalajara	2–2 (10–9 p)	Necaxa
19	1961	Guadalajara	1–0	Tampico
20	1962	Guadalajara	0–2	Atlas
21	1963	Oro	3–1	Guadalajara
22	1964	Guadalajara	2–0	América
23	1965	Guadalajara	2–1	América
24	1966	América	0–2	Necaxa
25	1967	Toluca	1–0	León
26	1968	Toluca	3–1; 0–1	Atlas
27	1969	Cruz Azul – champion automatically		
28	1970	Guadalajara – champion automatically		
29	1971	América	0–1	León
30	1972	Cruz Azul	0–0 (2–3 p)	León
1973		The competition was not held		
31	1974	Cruz Azul	2–1	América
32	1975	Toluca	0–1	Pumas UNAM
33	1976	América	2–0	Tigres UANL
1977–1987		The competition was not held		
34	1988	América	1–2; 2–0	Puebla
35	1989	América	2–1	Toluca
36	1990	Puebla – champion automatically		
1991–1994		The competition was not held		
37	1995	Necaxa – champion automatically		
1996–2002		The competition was not held		

Ed.	Season	Apertura champion	Score	Clausura champion
38	2003	Toluca	1–1 (4–2 p)	Monterrey
39	2004	Pachuca	2–1; 1–6	Pumas UNAM
40	2005	Pumas UNAM	0–0; 1–2	América
41	2006	Toluca	1–0; 1–0	Pachuca
2007–2014		The competition was not held		
42	2015	América	0–1	Santos Laguna
43	2016	Tigres UANL	1–0	Pachuca
44	2017	Tigres UANL	1–0	Guadalajara
45	2018	Tigres UANL	4–0	Santos Laguna
46	2019	América	0–0 (6–5 p)	Tigres UANL
2020		Canceled due to COVID-19 pandemic		
47	2021	León	1–2	Cruz Azul
48	2022	Atlas – champion automatically (Note: Trophy awarded automatically for winning the Apertura and Clausura tournaments.)		
49	2023	Pachuca	1–2	Tigres UANL
50	2024	América – champion automatically		
51	2025	América	1–3	Toluca
52	2026	Toluca	1–3	Cruz Azul

Source: RSSSF

== Performances ==
Rank	Club	Titles	Runner-up	Seasons
1	América	7	8	1955, 1976, 1988, 1989, 2005, 2019, 2024^{1}
1	Guadalajara	7	3	1957, 1959, 1960, 1961, 1964, 1965, 1970^{2}
3	León	5	4	1948, 1949^{2}, 1956, 1971, 1972
3	Toluca	5	4	1967, 1968, 2003, 2006, 2025
3	Atlas	5	1	1946, 1950, 1951, 1962, 2022^{1}
6	Tigres UANL	4	2	2016, 2017, 2018, 2023
6	Cruz Azul	4	1	1969^{2}, 1974, 2021, 2026
8	Necaxa	2	1	1966, 1995^{2}
8	Pumas UNAM	2	1	1975, 2004
8	Marte^{3}	2	0	1943, 1954
8	Real Club España^{3}	2	0	1944, 1945
12	Zacatepec	1	3	1958
12	Puebla	1	3	1990^{2}
12	Atlante	1	2	1952
12	Tampico^{3}	1	1	1953
12	Santos Laguna	1	1	2015
12	Moctezuma^{3}	1	0	1947
12	Oro	1	0	1963
19	Pachuca	0	4	—
19	Veracruz^{3}	0	3	—
19	Asturias^{3}	0	1	—
19	Monterrey	0	1	—

Notes

1. Automatic winners of the trophy for winning both league tournaments of the season.
2. Automatic winners of the trophy for winning the season's league and cup tournament.
3. Defunct.

== See also ==
- Sport in Mexico
- Football in Mexico
- Mexican Football Federation
- Liga MX
- Copa MX
- Supercopa MX
- Campeones Cup
- Campeón de Campeonas
