= Goal (website) =

Online association football news portal

- Website type: Sports journalism
- Available in: English; French; German; Spanish; Italian; Arabic; Thai; Portuguese; Dutch; Turkish; Indonesian; Korean; Japanese; Hungarian; Vietnamese
- Founded: 1998; 28 years ago (as a domain name)
- Headquarters: London, England
- Area served: Worldwide
- Owners: Integrated Media Company (TPG Inc.) (majority); DAZN Group (minority)
- Founders: Chicco Merighi; Gian Luigi Longinotti-Buitoni
- CEO: Juan Delgado
- Industry: Journalism
- Services: Association football news
- Website: goal.com
- Launched: 1998 (domain); 2005 (current state)
- Current status: Active

Logo used from 2020 to 2026.

Goal, stylized in all caps and alternatively known as Goal.com, is a website currently dedicated to the coverage of international association football. Currently owned by the Integrated Media Company (IMC) division of TPG Inc. since 2020, it is published in 18 languages across 38 global regions and edited by over 500 contributors as of 2019.

== History ==
Sports statistics company Perform Group acquired Goal.com for £18 million from its previous investors, which included Bessemer Venture Partners. In 2012, the website was investigated by HM Revenue and Customs department of the UK government over the use of unpaid interns.

In August 2016, Perform Group launched the online sports video streaming service DAZN. In September 2018 Perform Group was split into two companies: DAZN Group (named after its streaming service) for its consumer content operations, and Perform Content for its business-to-business services. Under this new structure, GOAL sat under DAZN. In March 2019, DAZN re-organized the Perform Media division into DAZN Media, which includes GOAL. In late 2020, GOAL, alongside Spox and Voetbalzone were packaged as a new company called FootballCo. Shortly after, a majority stake in FootballCo. was purchased by Integrated Media Company (IMC) which is a division of TPG Capital.

As of mid-2023, Goal was the fifth most popular sports news website in the UK, with 1.5 million monthly British readers according to a report by Press Gazette.

In November 2023, Footballco announced the appointment of Jason Wagenheim to the position of North America CEO. Wagenheim joined from BDG to grow Footballco's audience and revenue in the U.S., with a specific focus on GOAL.

In 2026, Press Gazette reported that GOAL's web traffic during the 2026 FIFA World Cup was up 42% and page views up by 55% compared to the 2022 FIFA World Cup, with data shared with Press Gazette showing that GOAL generated 439 million web and app page views across the tournament. Press Gazette.

== Video brands ==
In addition to the GOAL domain, GOAL (via Footballco) publishes a number of video-first brands. These include: The Beast Mode on Podcast: A podcast hosted by former professional footballer, Adebayo Akinfenwa GOAL's Front Three: A creator-led show focused on fun and games. GOAL's FanZone: A series featuring fan interaction and debates.

== Events ==
In 2026, GOAL hosted House of GOAL, a 17-day soccer culture festival in Brooklyn during the 2026 FIFA World Cup.

== Awards ==
In 2017 and 2020, GOAL won the Best Sports News Site award at The Drum Online Media Awards.

== GOAL50 ==
Since the 2007–08 season, the best 50 players of the respective season are selected by GOAL reporters and ranked as part of Goal's "Goal 50." Starting from the 2018–19 season, the 50 players were divided into 25 men and 25 women, with a winner from both genders being crowned. In 2021 voting was changed, with the list of available players chosen by GOAL journalists and the ranking decided by a public vote.

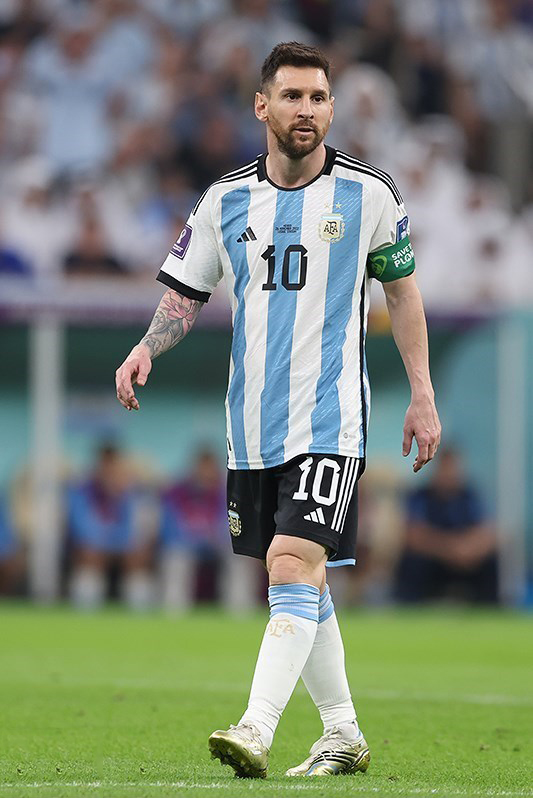
Lionel Messi is the record winner of the award having won it 7 times overall.

=== Men's winners ===
Season	Winner	Club(s)
2007–08	(Portugal) Cristiano Ronaldo	(England) Manchester United
2008–09	(Argentina) Lionel Messi	(Spain) Barcelona
2009–10	(Netherlands) Wesley Sneijder	(Italy) Internazionale
2010–11	(Argentina) Lionel Messi	(Spain) Barcelona
2011–12	(Portugal) Cristiano Ronaldo	(Spain) Real Madrid
2012–13	(Argentina) Lionel Messi	(Spain) Barcelona
2013–14	(Portugal) Cristiano Ronaldo	(Spain) Real Madrid
2014–15	(Argentina) Lionel Messi	(Spain) Barcelona
2015–16	(Portugal) Cristiano Ronaldo	(Spain) Real Madrid
2016–17	(Portugal) Cristiano Ronaldo	(Spain) Real Madrid
2017–18	(Croatia) Luka Modrić	(Spain) Real Madrid
2018–19	(Netherlands) Virgil van Dijk	(England) Liverpool
2019–20	(Poland) Robert Lewandowski	(Germany) Bayern Munich
2020–21	(Argentina) Lionel Messi	(Spain) Barcelona
2021–22	(Argentina) Lionel Messi	(France) Paris Saint-Germain
2022–23	(Argentina) Lionel Messi	(France) Paris Saint-Germain (United States) Inter Miami
2023–24	(Spain) Rodri	(England) Manchester City
2024–25	(Spain) Lamine Yamal	(Spain) Barcelona
2025–26	(England) Harry Kane	(Germany) Bayern Munich

=== Women's winners ===
Season	Winner	Club(s)
2018–19	(United States) Megan Rapinoe	(United States) Reign FC
2019–20	(Denmark) Pernille Harder	(Germany) VfL Wolfsburg (England) Chelsea
2020–21	(Spain) Alexia Putellas	(Spain) Barcelona
2021–22	(Spain) Alexia Putellas	(Spain) Barcelona
2022–23	(Zambia) Racheal Kundananji	(Spain) Madrid CFF
2023–24	(Spain) Aitana Bonmatí	(Spain) Barcelona

== NXGN ==
Since the 2016, GOAL has ranked the 50 best players aged under 19 for that respective season, with selections made by GOAL's network of journalists. The resulting list is known as the NXGN list, with the first-ranked players receiving the NXGN winner's award.

Since 2020, a women's list and award has also been published and handed out.

=== Men's winners ===
Season	Winner	Club(s)
2016	(Belgium) Youri Tielemans	(Belgium) Anderlecht
2017	(Italy) Gianluigi Donnarumma	(Italy) Milan
2018	(Netherlands) Justin Kluivert	(Netherlands) Ajax
2019	(England) Jadon Sancho	(Germany) Borussia Dortmund
2020	(Brazil) Rodrygo	(Spain) Real Madrid
2021	(Spain) Ansu Fati	(Spain) Barcelona
2022	(England) Jude Bellingham	(Germany) Borussia Dortmund
2023	This year the top 50 men's wonderkids players was not ranked.	-
2024	(Spain) Lamine Yamal	(Spain) Barcelona
2025	(Spain) Lamine Yamal	(Spain) Barcelona
2026	(Spain) Lamine Yamal	(Spain) Barcelona

=== Women's winners ===
Season	Winner	Club(s)
2020	(Germany) Lena Oberdorf	(Germany) SGS Essen
2021	(Sweden) Hanna Bennison	(Sweden) FC Rosengård
2022	(Haiti) Melchie Dumornay	(France) Reims
