= List of Mexican league top scorers =

The following article contains a year-by-year list and statistics of football topscorers in Liga MX (Mexican First Division).

== Amateur era topscorers (1902–1943) ==
Season	Player	Club	Goals	Matches
1902–1903	(Scotland) Josh Hogg	Orizaba Athletic Club	5	4
1903–1904	(Mexico) Julio Lacaud	Reforma Athletic Club	4	8
1904–1905	(England) Percy Clifford	British FC		
1906–1907	(England) Percy Clifford	British FC	5	8
1907–1908	(Scotland) Josh Hogg	British FC	4	6
1908–1909	(Mexico) Jorge Gómez de Parada	Reforma Athletic Club	3	4
	(England) William Bray	Pachuca Athletic Club	3	4
1909–1910	(England) Robert Blackmore	Reforma Athletic Club	4	6
1910–1911	(Mexico) Claude M. Butlin	Reforma Athletic Club	2	4
	(England) Alfred C. Crowle	Pachuca Athletic Club	2	4
1911–1912	(Scotland) John Hogg	British FC	3	4
1912–1913	(Mexico) Jorge Gómez de Parada	México FC	5	10
1913–1914	(Spain) Bernardo Rodríguez	Club España	6	8
1914–1915	(England) Alfred C. Crowle	Pachuca Athletic Club	6	10
1915–1916	(Spain) Lázaro Ibarreche	Club España	7	10
1916–1917	(Spain) Lázaro Ibarreche	Club España	6	10
1917–1918	(Spain) Lázaro Ibarreche	Club España	5	10
	(England) Frederick Williams	Pachuca Athletic Club	5	10
	(Mexico) Horacio "Moco" Ortíz	Pachuca Athletic Club	5	10
1918–1919	(Spain) Lázaro Ibarreche	Club España	11	12
1919–1920	(Spain) Lázaro Ibarreche	Club España	13	16
1920–1921			?	?
1921–1922			?	?
1922–1923			?	?
1923–1924			?	?
1924–1925	(Mexico) Ernesto Sota	Club América	10	?
1925–1926	(Switzerland) Kurt Friederich	Germania FV	11	?
1926–1927	(Mexico) Pedro Arruza	Real Club España	13	?
	(Mexico) Miguel Ruíz	Necaxa	13	?
1927–1928	(Mexico) Ernesto Sota	Club América	16	?
1928–1929	(Mexico) Nicho Mejia	Atlante FC	12	?
1929–1930	(Mexico) Jorge Sota	Club América	12	?
1930–1931	No championship			
1931–1932	(Mexico) Juan Carreño	Atlante FC	20	?
	(Peru) Julio Lores	Necaxa	20	?
1932–1933	(Peru) Julio Lores	Necaxa	8	?
1933–1934	(Mexico) José Pacheco	Asturias	12	?
1934–1935	(Mexico) Hilario "Moco" López	Necaxa	17	?
1935–1936	(Mexico) Hilario "Moco" López	Necaxa	14	?
1936–1937	(Mexico) Hilario "Moco" Lopez	Necaxa	11	?
1937–1938	(Mexico) Efrain Ruíz	Asturias	13	?
1938–1939	(Spain) Miguel Gual	Real Club España	20	?
1939–1940	(Mexico) Alberto "Caballo" Mendoza	Atlante FC	15	?
1940–1941	(Spain) Martí Ventolrà	Atlante FC	17	14
1941–1942	(Costa Rica) Rafael "Tico" Meza	Moctezuma	20	14
1942–1943	(Mexico) Manuel Alfonso	CD Marte	16	14

== Professional era (1943–present) ==
Season	Player	Club	Goals
1943–44	(Spain) Isidro Lángara	Real Club España	27
1944–45	(Argentina) Roberto Aballay	Asturias	40
1945–46	(Spain) Isidro Lángara (2)	Real Club España	40
1946–47	(Mexico) Adalberto López	León	33
1947–48	(Mexico) Adalberto López (2)	León	36
1948–49	(Mexico) Adalberto López (3)	León	28
1949–50	(Peru) Julio Ayllón	Veracruz	30
1950–51	(Mexico) Horacio Casarín	Necaxa	17
1951–52	(Mexico) Adalberto López (4)	Oro	16
1952–53	(Costa Rica) Julio Quiñones	Necaxa	14
1953–54	(Mexico) Juan Carlos Carrera	Oro	21
1953–54	(Mexico) Adalberto López (5)	León	21
1953–54	(Uruguay) Julio María Palleiro	Necaxa	21
1954–55	(Uruguay) Julio María Palleiro (2)	Necaxa	19
1955–56	(Mexico) Hector Hernández	Oro	25
1956–57	(Mexico) Crescencio Gutiérrez	Guadalajara	19
1957–58	(Argentina) Carlos Lara	Zacatepec	19
1958–59	(Mexico) Eduardo González Palmer	América	25
1959–60	(Mexico) Roberto Rolando	Tampico Madero	22
1960–61	(Argentina) Carlos Lara (2)	Zacatepec	22
1961–62	(Mexico) Salvador Reyes	Guadalajara	21
1961–62	(Argentina) (Mexico) Carlos Lara (3)	Zacatepec	21
1962–63	(Brazil) Amaury Epaminondas	Oro	19
1963–64	(Argentina) Carlos Alberto Etcheverry	UNAM	20
1964–65	(Brazil) Amaury Epaminondas	Oro	21
1965–66	(Brazil) José Alves	América	20
1966–67	(Brazil) Amaury Epaminondas (2)	Toluca	21
1967–68	(Mexico) Bernardo Hernández	Atlante	19
1968–69	(Mexico) Luis Estrada	León	24
1969–70	(Mexico) Vicente Pereda	Toluca	20
México 1970	(Mexico) Sergio Anaya	León	16
1970–71	(Mexico) Enrique Borja	América	20
1971–72	(Mexico) Enrique Borja (2)	América	26
1972–73	(Mexico) Enrique Borja (3)	América	24
1973–74	(Chile) Osvaldo Castro	América	26
1974–75	(Mexico) Horacio López Salgado	Cruz Azul	25
1975–76	(Brazil) Cabinho	UNAM	29
1976–77	(Brazil) Cabinho (2)	UNAM	34
1977–78	(Brazil) Cabinho (3)	UNAM	33
1978–79	(Brazil) Cabinho (4)	UNAM	26
1978–79	(Mexico) Hugo Sánchez	UNAM	26
1979–80	(Brazil) Cabinho (5)	Atlante	30
1980–81	(Brazil) Cabinho (6)	Atlante	29
1981–82	(Brazil) Cabinho (7)	Atlante	32
1982–83	(Argentina) Norberto Outes	América	22
1983–84	(Argentina) Norberto Outes (2)	Necaxa	28
1984–85	(Brazil) Cabinho (8)	León	23
Prode 1985	(Mexico) Sergio Lira	Tampico Madero	10
México 1986	(Mexico) Sergio Lira (2)	Tampico Madero	14
México 1986	(Mexico) Francisco Cruz	Monterrey	14
1986–87	(Uruguay) José Luis Zalazar	Tecos	23
1987–88	(Mexico) Luis Flores	UNAM	24
1988–89	(Mexico) Sergio Lira (3)	Tampico Madero	29
1989–90	(Argentina) Jorge Comas	Veracruz	26
1990–91	(Mexico) Luis García	UNAM	24
1991–92	(Mexico) Luis García (2)	UNAM	26
1992–93	(Chile) Ivo Basay	Necaxa	27
1993–94	(Mexico) Carlos Hermosillo	Cruz Azul	27
1994–95	(Mexico) Carlos Hermosillo (2)	Cruz Azul	35
1995–96	(Mexico) Carlos Hermosillo (3)	Cruz Azul	26
Invierno 1996	(Spain) Carlos Muñoz	Puebla	15
Verano 1997	(Argentina) Lorenzo Sáez	Pachuca	12
Verano 1997	(Argentina) Gabriel Caballero	Santos	12
Invierno 1997	(Mexico) Luis García (3)	Atlante	12
Verano 1998	(Paraguay) José Cardozo	Toluca	13
Invierno 1998	(Mexico) Cuauhtémoc Blanco	América	16
Verano 1999	(Paraguay) José Cardozo (2)	Toluca	15
Invierno 1999	(Mexico) Jesús Olalde	UNAM	15
Verano 2000	(Mexico) Everaldo Begines	León	14
Verano 2000	(Uruguay) Sebastián Abreu	Tecos	14
Verano 2000	(Ecuador) Agustín Delgado	Necaxa	14
Invierno 2000	(Mexico) Jared Borgetti	Santos Laguna	17
Verano 2001	(Mexico) Jared Borgetti (2)	Santos Laguna	13
Invierno 2001	(Uruguay) Martín Rodríguez	Irapuato	12
Verano 2002	(Uruguay) Sebastián Abreu (2)	Cruz Azul	19
Apertura 2002	(Paraguay) José Cardozo (3)	Toluca	29
Clausura 2003	(Paraguay) José Cardozo (4)	Toluca	21
Apertura 2003	(Colombia) Luis Gabriel Rey	Atlante	15
Clausura 2004	(Argentina) Andrés Silvera	UANL	16
Clausura 2004	(Argentina) Bruno Marioni	UNAM	16
Apertura 2004	(Argentina) Guillermo Franco	Monterrey	15
Clausura 2005	(Argentina) Matías Vuoso	Santos Laguna	15
Apertura 2005	(Argentina) Matías Vuoso (2)	Santos Laguna	11
Apertura 2005	(Argentina) Walter Gaitán	UANL	11
Apertura 2005	(Brazil) Kléber Pereira	América	11
Apertura 2005	(Uruguay) Sebastián Abreu (3)	Dorados	11
Clausura 2006	(Uruguay) Sebastián Abreu (4)	Dorados	11
Clausura 2006	(Paraguay) Salvador Cabañas	Jaguares	11
Apertura 2006	(Argentina) Bruno Marioni (2)	Toluca	11
Clausura 2007	(Mexico) Omar Bravo	Guadalajara	11
Apertura 2007	(Argentina) Alfredo Moreno	San Luis	18
Clausura 2008	(Chile) Humberto Suazo	Monterrey	13
Apertura 2008	(Chile) Héctor Mancilla	Toluca	11
Clausura 2009	(Chile) Héctor Mancilla (2)	Toluca	14
Apertura 2009	(Argentina) Emanuel Villa	Cruz Azul	17
Bicentenario 2010	(Mexico) Javier Hernández	Guadalajara	10
Bicentenario 2010	(United States) Hérculez Gómez	Puebla	10
Bicentenario 2010	(Peru) Johan Fano	Atlante	10
Apertura 2010	(Ecuador) Christian Benítez	Santos Laguna	14
Clausura 2011	(Mexico) Ángel Reyna	América	13
Apertura 2011	(Uruguay) Iván Alonso	Toluca	11
Clausura 2012	(Uruguay) Iván Alonso	Toluca	14
Clausura 2012	(Ecuador) Christian Benítez (2)	América	14
Apertura 2012	(Chile) Esteban Paredes	Atlante	11
Apertura 2012	(Ecuador) Christian Benítez (3)	América	11
Clausura 2013	(Ecuador) Christian Benítez (4)	América	17
Apertura 2013	(Paraguay) Pablo Velázquez	Toluca	12
Apertura 2013	(Argentina) Mauro Boselli	León	12
Clausura 2014	(Ecuador) Enner Valencia	Pachuca	12
Apertura 2014	(Argentina) Mauro Boselli (2)	León	12
Apertura 2014	(Brazil) Camilo Sanvezzo	Querétaro	12
Clausura 2015	(Colombia) Dorlan Pabón	Monterrey	10
Apertura 2015	(Argentina) Mauro Boselli (3)	León	13
Apertura 2015	(Argentina) Emanuel Villa (2)	Querétaro	13
Clausura 2016	(France) André-Pierre Gignac	UANL	13
Apertura 2016	(Colombia) Dayro Moreno	Tijuana	11
Apertura 2016	(Peru) Raúl Ruidíaz	Morelia	11
Clausura 2017	(Peru) Raúl Ruidíaz (2)	Morelia	9
Apertura 2017	(Argentina) Mauro Boselli (4)	León	11
Apertura 2017	(Colombia) Avilés Hurtado	Monterrey	11
Clausura 2018	(Cape Verde) Djaniny	Santos Laguna	14
Apertura 2018	(France) André-Pierre Gignac (2)	UANL	14
Clausura 2019	(Ecuador) Ángel Mena	León	14
Apertura 2019	(Argentina) Mauro Quiroga	Necaxa	12
Apertura 2019	(Mexico) Alan Pulido	Guadalajara	12
Guard1anes 2020	(Uruguay) Jonathan Rodríguez	Cruz Azul	12
Guard1anes 2021	(Argentina) Alexis Canelo	Toluca	11
Grita México 2021	(Uruguay) Nicolás López	UANL	9
Grita México 2021	(Argentina) Germán Berterame	San Luis	9
Grita México 2022	(France) André-Pierre Gignac (3)	UANL	11
Apertura 2022	(Argentina) Nicolás Ibáñez	Pachuca	11
Clausura 2023	(Mexico) Henry Martín	América	14
Apertura 2023	(Colombia) Harold Preciado	Santos Laguna	11
Clausura 2024	(Mexico) Uriel Antuna	Cruz Azul	8
Clausura 2024	(Venezuela) Salomón Rondón	Pachuca	8
Clausura 2024	(Colombia) Diber Cambindo	Necaxa	8
Clausura 2024	(Uruguay) Federico Viñas	León	8
Apertura 2024	(Portugal) Paulinho	Toluca	13
Clausura 2025	(Portugal) Paulinho (2)	Toluca	12
Clausura 2025	(Montenegro) Đurđević	Atlas	12
Clausura 2025	(Colombia) Raúl Zúñiga	Tijuana	12
Apertura 2025	(Portugal) Paulinho (3)	Toluca	12
Apertura 2025	(Mexico) Armando González	Guadalajara	12
Apertura 2025	(Italy) João Pedro	San Luis	12
Clausura 2026	(Italy) João Pedro (2)	San Luis	14

== See also ==
- Football in Mexico
