= Jaime Gómez (footballer, born 1929) =

Mexican footballer (1929-2008)

Personal information
- Full name: Jaime David Gómez Munguía
- Date of birth: 29 December 1929
- Place of birth: Manzanillo, Colima, Mexico
- Date of death: 4 May 2008 (aged 78)
- Place of death: Guadalajara, Jalisco, Mexico
- Height: 1.71 m (5 ft 7 in)
- Position: Goalkeeper

Senior career*
Years	Team	Apps	(Gls)
1950–1964	Guadalajara	301	(?)
1964–1967	Monterrey		
1968–1969	Oro		
1969–1970	Laguna		

International career
1956–1960	Mexico	9	(0)
- * Club domestic league appearances and goals

Jaime David Gómez Munguía (29 December 1929 – 4 May 2008) was a Mexican professional footballer who played as a goalkeeper.

== Career ==
José Gómez, originally from Manzanillo, Colima, began his athletic career as a volleyball player. Distinguished by his explosive jump and physical strength, he earned the nickname “Tubo” during a national championship, when a journalist observed: “This player really strikes the ball as if with a tube.”

Subsequently, Gómez turned his attention to football, choosing to specialize as a goalkeeper. He joined Guadalajara, where he was an integral figure during the era known as El Campeonísimo. In this period, he helped the club secure six Primera División championships.

His consistent performances at the club level led to his selection for the Mexico national team. Gómez represented Mexico in two FIFA World Cups: Sweden 1958 and Chile 1962.

== Personal ==
Gómez died from pancreatic cancer at age 78.

== Honours ==
Guadalajara

- Primera División de México: 1956–57, 1958–59, 1959–60, 1960–61, 1961–62, 1963–64
