= Árpád Fekete =

Hungarian footballer and manager (1921–2012)

Personal information
- Date of birth: 5 March 1921
- Place of birth: Salgótarján, Hungary
- Date of death: 26 February 2012 (aged 90)
- Place of death: Guadalajara, Mexico
- Position: Centre forward

Youth career
- 1935–1938: Újpest

Senior career*
Years	Team	Apps	(Gls)
1938–1945	Újpest		
1946	Carmen București	8	(6)
1946–1948	Como	38	(13)
1948–1949	Pro Sesto	25	(14)
1949–1950	SPAL	11	(0)
1950–1951	Cosenza	0	(0)
1951–1952	Messina	15	(6)
1952–1953	Cagliari	2	(0)
Total		99	(39)

Managerial career
- 1957–1960: Guadalajara
- 1962–1965: C.D. Oro
- 1963: Mexico
- 1965–1966: Deportivo Toluca
- 1966–1967: Club Atlas
- 1967–1968: C.D. Oro
- 1968–1969: Pumas UNAM
- 1968–1969: San Isidro Laguna
- 1970: Club Jalisco
- 1970–1971: Club Atlas
- 1971–1973: San Isidro Laguna
- 1974–1976: Pumas UNAM
- 1974–1976: Tigres
- 1977–1978: Tecos
- 1978–1979: Atlante
- 1979–1981: Universidad de Guadalajara
- 1981: León
- 1982: Atlético Morelia
- 1982–1983: Club Atlas
- 1983–1985: León
- 1986–1987: Deportivo Toluca
- 1990: Guadalajara
- * Club domestic league appearances and goals

Árpád Fekete (5 March 1921 – 26 February 2012) was a Hungarian football player and manager.

== Career ==
Born in Salgótarján, Fekete played as a centre forward in Hungary, Romania and Italy for Újpest, Carmen București, Como, Pro Sesto, SPAL, Cosenza, Messina and Cagliari.

He later became a football coach in Mexico, managing Guadalajara and the Mexico national team among others. Fekete managed four clubs from Guadalajara, Chivas, C.D. Oro, Club Atlas and Tecos, and won Liga MX titles with Chivas and Oro.

== Honours ==
=== Player ===
Újpest

- Nemzeti Bajnokság I: 1938–39, 1945
- Mitropa Cup: 1939

=== Manager ===
Guadalajara

- Mexican Primera División: 1958–59, 1959–60
- Campeón de Campeones: 1959, 1960

C.D. Oro

- Mexican Primera División: 1962–63
- Campeón de Campeones: 1963

Pumas UNAM

- Copa México: 1974–75
