= Mariano Varela =

Mexican football manager

Personal information
- Full name: Juan Mariano Varela Garza
- Date of birth: 14 April 1972 (age 54)
- Place of birth: Tampico, Tamaulipas, Mexico
- Height: 1.72 m (5 ft 8 in)
- Position: Midfielder

Senior career*
Years	Team	Apps	(Gls)
1990–1995	Tigres UANL		
1996–2002	C.D. Guadalajara	111	(2)
2003	Lagartos de Tabasco	9	(0)
2003	Dorados de Sinaloa	2	(0)
- * Club domestic league appearances and goals

Juan Mariano Varela Garza (born 14 April 1972) is a Mexican football official and former player who played primarily as midfielder

== Career ==
During the first half of the 1990s, Varela was under contract with the Tigres UANL. He then moved to C.D. Guadalajara, but was not part of the first team squad when they won the tenth championship title in the club's history in the 1997 summer tournament. At the end of his career he played for the Lagartos de Tabasco and the Dorados de Sinaloa for half a season each, but later returned to Deportivo Guadalajara in various roles and held the office of vice president at the Costa Rican record champions Deportivo Saprissa, which at the time also belonged to the owner of Deportivo Guadalajara, Jorge Vergara.
