= Edgar Everaert =

Belgium footballer (1888–1957)

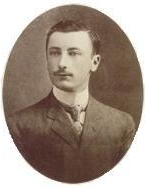
Edgar Everaert

Edgar Everaert was a Belgian immigrant to Mexico who founded one of Liga MX's most popular and successful football teams, Club Deportivo Guadalajara.

Born in Bruges, Belgium, Everaert immigrated to Mexico in 1904, eventually settling in Guadalajara. There he founded, along with other individuals, the football team Club Unión de Futbol. The team adopted the name Club Deportivo Guadalajara in 1908.
