= Jesús Bracamontes =

Mexican footballer and manager (born 1951)

Personal information
- Full name: Jesús Bracamontes Zenizo
- Date of birth: 24 December 1951 (age 74)
- Place of birth: Colima City, Colima, Mexico
- Position: Midfielder

Senior career*
Years	Team	Apps	(Gls)
1981–1983	Guadalajara	24	(1)

Managerial career
- 1989–1990: Guadalajara
- 1991–1993: Guadalajara
- 1994–1995: UAT
- 1995–1996: UAG
- 1996: Atlético Morelia
- 2000–2001: Guadalajara
- * Club domestic league appearances and goals

Jesús Bracamontes Zenizo (Spanish pronunciation: [xeˈsus βɾakaˈmonte seˈniso]; born 24 December 1951) is a Mexican former professional football player and manager.

== Career ==
Bracamontes gained prominence as the coach of Club Deportivo Guadalajara in the 1990s. He also served as assistant coach for the Mexico national team.

Bracamontes later worked as a long-serving football analyst along with Pablo Ramírez for the U.S. Spanish-language TV station Univision. On 31 May 2022 he announced his retirement on broadcasting on Univision.

== Family ==
Jesús is the father of Jacqueline Bracamontes, an actress and model who became famous after representing Mexico at the Miss Universe 2001 contest. His son is named after him.

The wife of Jesús is Jacqueline van Hoorde, who is of Belgian descent.

Jesús is also the oldest brother of Former player and coach Carlos Bracamontes.
