= Pepe Martínez (footballer) =

Mexican footballer (1953-1981)

Personal information
- Full name: José Martínez González
- Date of birth: 29 May 1953
- Place of birth: El Arenal, Jalisco, Mexico
- Date of death: 14 February 1981 (aged 27)
- Place of death: Puebla, Mexico
- Position: Midfielder

Senior career*
Years	Team	Apps	(Gls)
1970–1981	Guadalajara		
- * Club domestic league appearances and goals

José Martínez González (29 May 1953 – 14 February 1981), better known as Pepe Martínez, was a Mexican footballer.

== Club career ==
"Pepe" Martínez played club football for Chivas de Guadalajara.

== Death ==
He died in a traffic accident involving the Chivas team bus in Puebla at age 27. His jersey number 22 was retired by the club and is only used when mandatory in Copa Libertadores matches. Also is used in CONCACAF Champions games
