= Campeonísimo =

Campeonísimo was the title given to the exceptional champions in Mexican football from 1907 to 1996 who won both the Copa Mexico and the League title in the same year.

== History ==
In the early Mexican championships, the clubs used to play a yearly tournament. The professional era began in Mexico in 1944, but there was a tournament that had been played since the early 1900s, the Copa Mexico, also known as the Tower Cup. A club that won both the Copa Mexico and the League title would given the Campeonísimo title.

There are only five clubs who achieved this. Club León was the first to obtain this prestigious title in 1949. Guadalajara obtained theirs in 1957, and Cruz Azul achieved theirs in the 1968–69 season. Club Puebla obtained it in the 1989–90 season, winning the League title against the Leones Negros and the Copa Mexico against the UANL Tigres. Necaxa was the last to achieve the title in 1994.

At the end of the 1995 championship, the Federation decided to play a tournament with an open and closed format, and the Copa Mexico could not be played and was forgotten, ending the list of teams to achieve the Campeonísimo.

Hypothetically, the Campeonísimo title could be given due to the participation of Mexican clubs in the revived Copa MX, the FIFA Club World Cup, and the CONCACAF Champions League. The feat was achieved by Guadalajara in the Clausura 2017 season after they won their 4th Copa MX title against Monarcas Morelia and their 12th league title against Tigres UANL.
