= Jorge Vergara =

Mexican businessman and film producer (1955–2019)

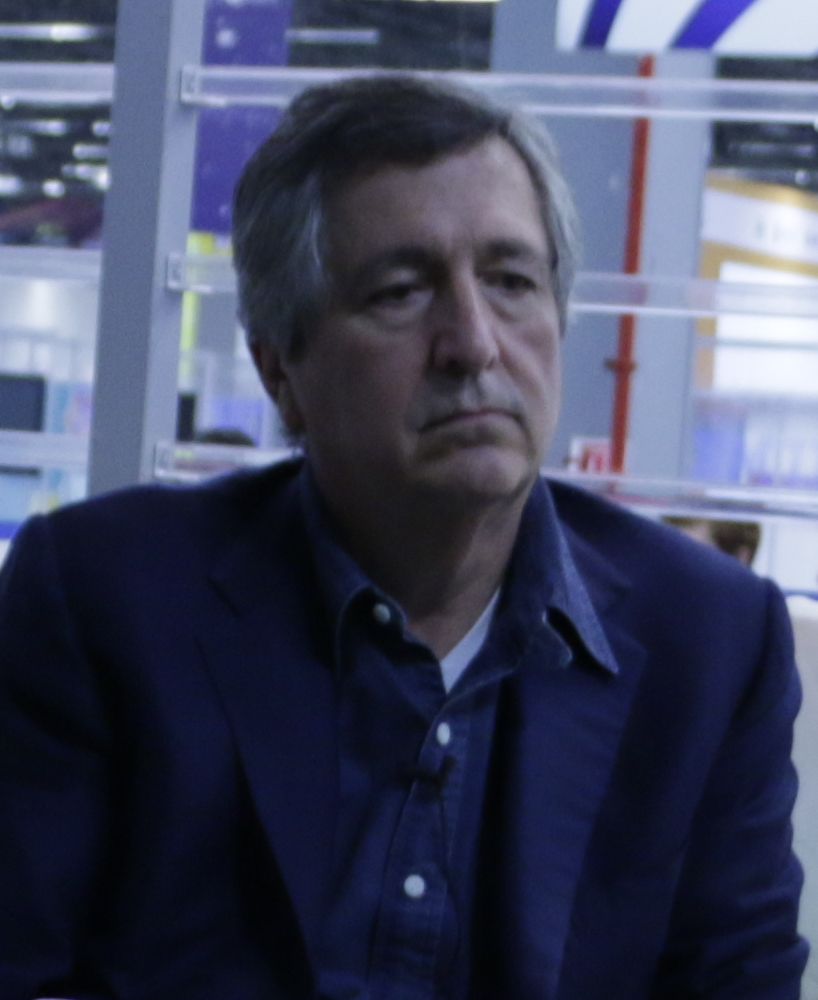
- Vergara in 2015
- Born: 3 March 1955; Guadalajara, Mexico
- Died: 15 November 2019 (aged 64); New York City, U.S.
- Occupation(s): Businessman, film producer
- Known for: Founder of Grupo Omnilife; Owner of C.D. Guadalajara

Jorge Carlos Vergara Madrigal (Spanish pronunciation: [ˈxoɾxe βeɾˈɣaɾa]; 3 March 1955 – 15 November 2019) was a Mexican businessman and film producer. He was the founder of the multi-level marketing company Grupo Omnilife. In addition to its health products business, Grupo Omnilife owns the football club C.D. Guadalajara. Vergara was also owner of Costa Rican football team Saprissa (2003–2011) and Major League Soccer club Chivas USA (2004–2014).

Vergara produced internationally recognized films such as The Assassination of Richard Nixon and the Oscar-nominated Y Tu Mamá También through the production company, Producciones Anhelo.

He organized a cruise to Cuba for children affected by the terrorist attack at School No. 1 in Beslan in 2004.

== Career ==
=== Business ===
Born in Guadalajara, Vergara once sold tacos on Mexican streets. Back in the 1980s Vergara sold condominiums and timeshares in Manzanillo, Mexico, where he met and began working with John Peterson.

When Peterson became a Herbalife salesperson, he recruited Vergara and together they began selling Herbalife products in Mexico. Since Herbalife had not received Mexican government approval to sell their products, Peterson and Vergara had to smuggle the products into the country. After six months of smuggling the products into Mexico, Herbalife took notice and began the process of getting government approval. Vergara was asked to help get the Herbalife products approved by the Mexican government and was instrumental in helping Herbalife's founder, Mark R. Hughes deal with the Mexican Government. This gave Vergara insight into how a multi-level company profits and expands into other countries. Vergara was partners with Roger Daley, Jim Fobair and Charlie Ragus. With already the 51% of the company, Vergara acquired the rest of Omnitrition at the end of the deal with his U.S. partners and took the whole control of Omnitrition de Mexico. Since its foundation in 1991, the privately owned corporation has grown from one company, Omnilife de Mexico, to comprise nineteen companies. Today, approximately 5.2 million people distribute Omnilife products in 22 countries, while the company has reached annual sales of nearly $4.2 billion.

Vergara was the director of Omnilife de Mexico from 1991 to his death.

=== Film ===
In 1999, Vergara met film director Alfonso Cuarón while seeking out filmmakers for his corporate movies. Cuarón, however, was more interested in filming Y Tu Mamá También, and gave Vergara the screenplay. A known lover of films, Vergara read it and right away proposed that they begin production. In the process they established a production company Producciones Anhelo that would go on to co-produce Guillermo del Toro's The Devil's Backbone, along with Pedro Almodóvar's El Deseo and del Toro's Tequila Gang. Anhelo also produced Sebastián Cordero's Crónicas.

In 2002, Variety named Vergara one of its Ten Producers to Watch. For the 2004 edition of the Guadalajara International Film Festival, Vergara created the JVC Award for Best Director, which was given to Fernando Eimbcke for his feature debut Temporada de patos.

=== Chivas ===
Vergara gained ownership of the football team C.D. Guadalajara (popularly known as Chivas) in 2002. Shortly after he took ownership in Mexico, while attending the 2004 U.S. Major League Soccer All-Star Game, he announced intentions to expand Chivas to MLS.

Vergara and MLS inaugurated Chivas USA in 2004, and the team played its first official season in 2005 with Home Depot Center in the Los Angeles area as its home stadium. Chivas USA was initially successful; in its first five seasons of operation, the team recorded four straight MLS playoff appearances. Both performance and attendance declined sharply after 2009.

On 20 February 2014, Major League Soccer purchased Chivas USA from Vergara. They announced plans to sell to a buyer dedicated to keeping the club in Los Angeles, as well as a plan to rebrand the club. After being unable to find a buyer, the club folded following the 2014 season. A new club, Los Angeles FC, was founded in 2018, but with no connection to the former Chivas USA club.

== Personal life ==
Vergara had six children.

Vergara and Rossana Lerdo de Tejada were married 10 June 2017 in Guadalajara, Mexico. Lerdo de Tejada is his widow.

== Death ==
Vergara died on 15 November 2019 at the age of 64 in New York City as a result of a cardiac arrest.
