= Pablo Ramírez =

Mexican sports journalist

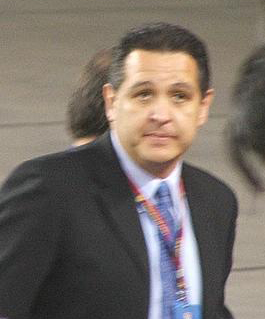
- Born: Pablo Ramírez
- Occupations: Sports journalist, commentator, actor, footballer
- Years active: 1980–present
- Height: 1.96m (6ft 5in)

Pablo Ramírez is a Mexican Spanish-language sportscaster in the United States. Born in Sinaloa, Ramírez grew up in Jalisco, Mexico. Ramírez primarily provides Spanish-language commentary for football (soccer) matches. He is best known for working along with Jesus Bracamontes for the US-based Spanish-language TV station Univision until his departure in 2022.

Nicknamed La Torre de Jalisco (the tower of Jalisco) due to his height, at 6'5"/196 cm.

== Early career ==
During the early 1980s Ramírez played football as a goalkeeper for Atlético Tecomán in the Mexican Third Division, until a serious injury prevented him for playing football at a higher level. He also made a cameo appearance in the 2014 film Rio 2.

In 2023, Ramírez was named one of the Spanish-language commentators for Major League Soccer coverage on Apple TV.
