= C.D. Guadalajara =

Association football club in Mexico

Guadalajara
- Full name: Club Deportivo Guadalajara S.A. de C.V.
- Nicknames: Chivas (Goats); Chivas Rayadas (Striped Goats; Rebaño Sagrado (Sacred Herd); Rojiblancos (Red and Whites); Campeonísimo
- Short name: GDL, CHI
- Founded: 8 May 1906; 120 years ago (as Unión Football Club)
- Ground: Estadio Akron
- Capacity: 48,071
- Owner: Grupo Omnilife
- President: Amaury Vergara
- Head coach: Gabriel Milito
- League: Liga MX
- Clausura 2026: Regular phase: 2nd of 18; Final phase: Semi-finals
- Website: chivasdecorazon.com.mx
Home colours	Away colours

Club Deportivo Guadalajara S.A de C.V., also known as Chivas de Guadalajara, is a professional football club based in the Guadalajara metropolitan area, Jalisco. The club competes in Liga MX, the top division of Mexican football, and plays its home matches at Estadio Akron. Founded in 1906 as Unión Football Club, the club changed its name to Guadalajara Football Club in 1908, and later changed to its current name in 1923. Nicknamed Chivas, it was one of ten founding members of the professional era of the Liga Mayor (current Liga MX). Guadalajara is one of the four most popular clubs in Mexico and one of seven Mexican clubs that have never been relegated.

Chivas is the only football club in Mexico that does not sign foreign or naturalized players unless they are of Mexican descent. The team has historically relied on home-grown (cantera) players and has been the launching pad of many internationally successful players, including Javier Hernández, Carlos Vela and Carlos Salcido, among others.

Domestically, CD Guadalajara is one of the most successful Mexican clubs, winning twelve Liga MX titles, four Copa MX titles, seven Campeón de Campeones and one Supercopa MX, and also holds the league record for the longest winning streak at the beginning of a season, with eight consecutive wins in the Bicentenario 2010. Internationally, it has won two CONCACAF Champions Cup/Champions League titles, and also finished as runners-up in the 2010 Copa Libertadores.

According to a study of preferred football clubs in 2016, Guadalajara was the most popular Mexican club, with 44.2% of supporters in the country. In 2020, Forbes estimated that the club was the most valuable of the league, ranking sixth overall in the Americas, worth approximately $311.5 million.

== History ==
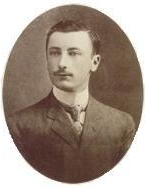
Edgar Everaert, founder of C.D. Guadalajara

=== Early history ===
The team was founded by Edgar Everaert, who arrived in Mexico in 1906. First named "Unión" because of the camaraderie between the players of different nationalities, most of whom were employees of the Fábricas de Francia store, with founder Everaert as coach. A few Spanish and English players also became members of the Unión Football Club. The club's first match was against Gimnasio Atlético Occidental. That match, Unión was coached by member Rafael Orozco, who alongside his brother, Gregorio, were the first Mexicans at Unión. The Orozco family were one of the club's earliest benefactors, with Orozco's grandmother, Nicolasa Sáinz, allowing her home to be used as Unión's first clubhouse. His uncle, Sabino Orozco, who reportedly came up with the name Unión, would also donate land to the club that would become its first ground.

On a tour of Europe, Everaert noticed that European teams named after their respective town or city seemed to generate more support from fans in their communities. Once he returned to Guadalajara, Jalisco, he told his observations to Rafael and Gregorio Orozco. So, in 1908, in a club meeting at Sáinz's house attended by the Orozco brothers, Sabino Orozco, and the remaining Mexican Unión members, Club de Fútbol Unión was renamed as Club Deportivo Guadalajara to engender a sense of loyalty within the city's population. Notably, this decision was made without Everaert or any European members present. Gregorio Orozco would take credit for the decision to rename the club. At the same meeting, Rafael Orozco would be named the first club president.

=== Amateur Era (1908–1943) ===
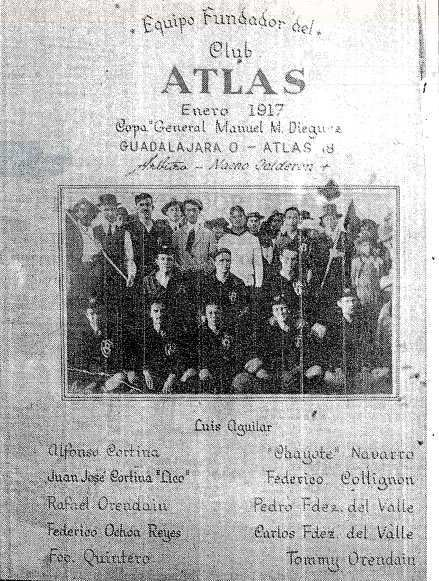
Newspaper from January 1917 demonstrating the Atlas line-up in their 18–0 victory in a Liga Occidental match against Guadalajara. The match would prove pivotal in forming one of the fiercest rivalries in Jaliscan and Mexican football.

Newly founded Atlas would join the league, becoming a powerhouse in Tapatio football winning 4 tournaments from 1918 to 1921, with Guadalajara finishing runners-up twice. Guadalajara would win the 1922 tournament as well as in 1923 and 1924, with Atlas finishing runners-up all thrice. The competitiveness and the socioeconomic differences of the clubs would create the Clásico Tapatío, one of the oldest and fiercest rivalries in Mexican football.

From 1924 to 1934, Chivas would win 5 Occidente titles, only losing the other championships to newly founded Nacional. During this period, the Selección Jalisco would be founded in 1926 by the members of the Liga Occidente. A regional team composed of the best players from Jalisco based in Club Guadalajara, Atlas, Nacional, and Oro, would play exhibitions against Primera Fuerza teams based in Mexico City, and by 1937, teams outside of Mexico. By 1940, the popularity of the exhibition side would result in many players being poached by Mexico City-based clubs, and later in an invitation to the Primera Fuerza. The 1941 Primera Fuerza tournament would end with the Selección Jalisco finishing second in their inaugural tournament. The exhibition team would participate in the following Primera Fuerza tournaments, before the foundation of the Liga Mayor.

Between 1906 and 1943, Guadalajara won 13 amateur titles.

=== Professional Era and "El Ya Merito" (1943–1955) ===
In 1943 the Liga Mayor was founded after the merging of several regional leagues and the era of professional football began. Guadalajara would make their professional debut on 6 July 1943 in the Copa MX, where they would play against local rivals Atlas. They would go on to lose the match 3–1, with Manuel "Cosas" López's 30-minute goal becoming the first of Guadalajara's professional era. Later that year, they would make their Liga Mayor debut on 21 October against Atlante, where they would go on to win 1–4 at Parque Asturias. Pablo "Pablotas" González scored the first league goal in Guadalajara's history.

Guadalajara struggled during the early years, with the exception of the 1948–49 season when they finished third. This same year Guadalajara was given the name "Chivas Locas" (Crazy Goats) during a game against Tampico. The name was initially considered an insult but later adopted as the team's nickname due to the overwhelming popularity of the club.

During the 1952 season, Guadalajara would challenge for their first league title, competing with León and city rivals Atlas and Oro. Guadalajara were league leaders by matchday 20, but a 0–1 loss at home to León on matchday 21 and a 1–0 loss away at Puebla on the final matchday would result in León winning the title by one point. Guadalajara would again challenge for the league title in the 1954–55 seasons, where the team finished as runner-up in the league to Zacatepec. This era of competing for the title would lead to the nickname "¡Ya Merito!" ("Almost There!").

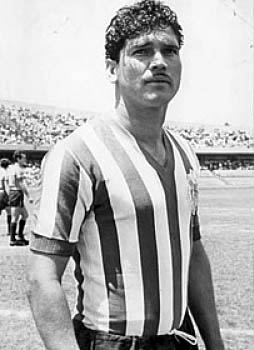
A prolific homegrown forward, Salvador Reyes led Guadalajara to success during "El Campeonísimo".

=== "El Campeonísimo" (1955–1970) ===
During the 1956–57 season, players such as Salvador "Chava" Reyes, Jaime "El Tubo" Gómez, Arturo "Curita" Chaires, Juan "Bigotón" Jasso, Isidoro "Chololo" Díaz, Guillermo "Tigre" Sepúlveda, and José "Jamaicón" Villegas formed part of the team known as El Campeonísimo. Guadalajara won its first professional league championship on January 3, 1957, after Salvador Reyes scored the winning goal against Irapuato. This marked the beginning of one of the club's most successful periods.

Led by coaches such as Donaldo Ross and Javier de la Torre, Guadalajara went on to win eight league championships between 1956–57 and 1969–70, along with two Copa México titles, seven Campeón de Campeones honors, and the 1962 CONCACAF Champions' Cup.

Chivas is the only team in Mexico's professional top division to have achieved a tetracampeonato, which refers to winning four consecutive league championships. During the 1958–59, 1959–60, 1960–61, and 1961–62 seasons, Guadalajara won four consecutive Mexican league titles. Although other clubs, such as Club América and Cruz Azul, have achieved three consecutive championships (tricampeonato), Guadalajara remains the only club to have won four consecutive league championships in Mexico's professional era.

El Campeonísimo also gained international recognition. In 1964, Guadalajara traveled to Europe to play ten matches against clubs including FC Barcelona, Werder Bremen, and Lille OSC. The tour ended with two victories, four draws, and four defeats.

=== "Las Chivas Flacas" (1971–1983) ===
During the 1970s and early 1980s, Guadalajara struggled a lot. In the 1970–71 season, the team finished very close to the relegation zone. The best they could manage to reach was the play-offs twice, with a fifth-place finish in 1971–72 and a sixth-place finish in 1976–77. They began to be nicknamed "Las Chivas Flacas" (The Lean Goats), due to their lean athletic performances. During the 1980–81 season, on February 14, 1981, the bus transporting the team to a match in the city of Puebla was hit by a trailer, taking the life of midfielder José "Pepe" Martínez. During 1980–81 season, the team reached a third-place ranking. Eleven years after their near-relegation in 1971, Guadalajara managed to escape it yet again in the 1981–82 season by just one point.

=== Recovery (1983–1991) ===
Improvement came soon after the hiring of coach Alberto Guerra, who had been a player for Guadalajara during the mid '60s. During the 1982–83 season, Guadalajara finished seventh in the league and qualified for the playoffs, going on to eliminate Atlante in quarter-finals and América in Semifinals. The team reached the finals for the first time since the playoff format was introduced in the '70s, where they would go on to lose to Puebla in a penalty shootout. Guadalajara would once again reach the Finals in 1983–84, only to lose to América by an aggregate score of 5–4. The club would continue being competitive the rest of the '80s and early '90s, with their very best performance in the 1986–87 season, where they would finish 1st in the regular season and win the Championship against Cruz Azul in the final.

=== "La Promotora" Era (1992–2002) ===
By the end of the 1980s, Guadalajara began to experience several financial troubles. Team directors decided to create a special financial sector that would be known as La Promotora Deportiva. The team would be "sold" for 10 years starting in 1992 to a petroleum executive named Salvador Martínez Garza, who would be in charge of the Promotora and of team operations.

The new directors decided to bring back Guadalajara's champion coach of the 1986–87 season Alberto Guerra and purchase many players that would become icons for Guadalajara in the early '90s: Missael "Missa" Espinoza, Alberto "Guamerú" García, and Alberto Coyote. The team also relied on young talent from the youth academy. Such talent included Paulo Cesar "Tilón" Chávez and Joel "Tiburón" Sánchez. At the beginning of the 93–94 season, the press and fans dubbed the new and improved team Las Superchivas.

By 1996, the Primera División de México season format would be changed to two short seasons per year. The first of the seasons, Invierno 1996, saw Guadalajara bring in another coach, Brazilian Ricardo Ferretti. During Ferretti's first season, the team managed to reach third place in the league table, but would be eliminated by Club Necaxa in the Quarterfinals. Guadalajara won its 10th championship under Ferretti in the Verano 1997 season against Toros Neza with the aggregate score of 7–2. Guadalajara would once again reach the Finals in the Invierno 1998 season, only to once again lose to Necaxa.

=== New Ownership Era (2002–2011) ===
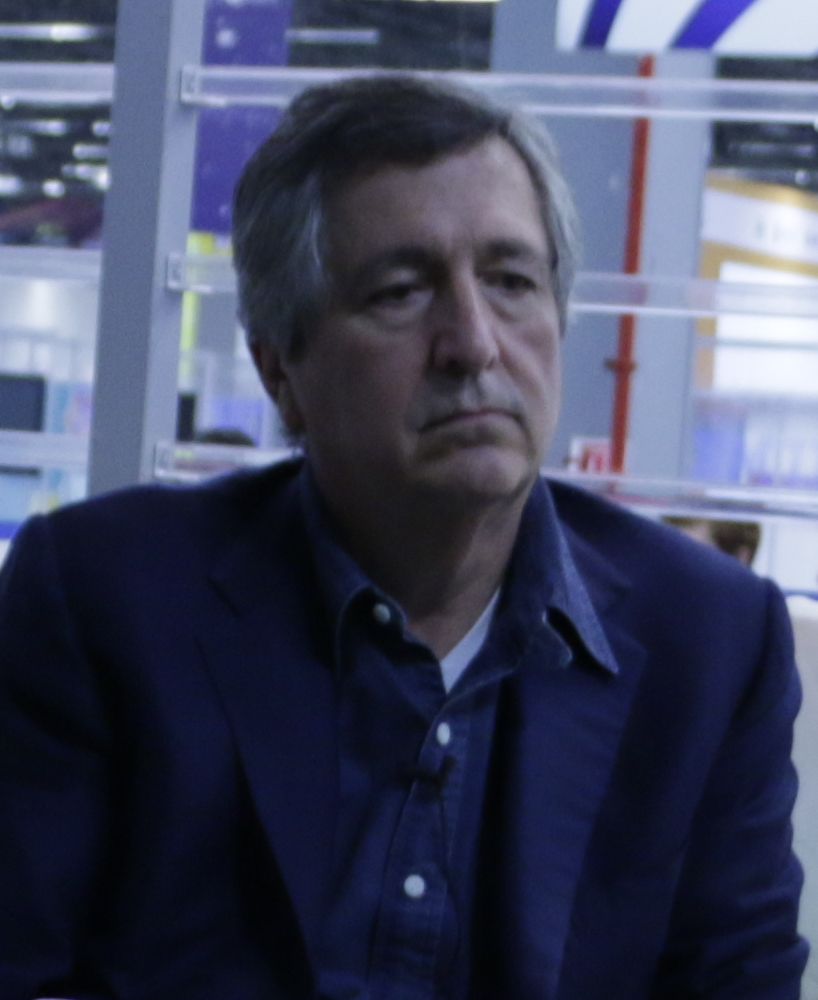
Jorge Vergara's company, Grupo Omnilife, have owned the club since 2002.

After its tenth year in charge of Guadalajara, La Promotora was still in debt and finally put up for sale. On 31 October 2002, the team was acquired by a Guadalajara native and self-made entrepreneur, Jorge Vergara.

In order to establish funding for the team, Vergara sought to market the Las Chivas name and capitalize on it, placing the name on anything from its own magazine to toothbrushes and its own brand of cola.

In February 2004, it was announced that the club would construct a new stadium (Estadio Akron).

In the Apertura 2004, Guadalajara would display an offensive style of football and managed to place third in the league standings, qualifying for the playoffs. Players such as goalkeeper Oswaldo Sánchez, Ramon Morales, Omar Bravo, and newly acquired Adolfo "Bofo" Bautista, became instant fan favorites. They defeated Atlante in the quarterfinals and Toluca in the semifinals, but would lose in the Finals against Pumas UNAM in a penalty shootout. Nevertheless, the team had shown, since Vergara's arrival, that it was highly competitive, including in the 2005 Copa Libertadores, where it defeated favorites Boca Juniors 4–0 aggregate to reach the semifinals. In the semifinals, they lost to Athletico Paranaense 5–2. Under coach José Manuel de la Torre, who was a player for Guadalajara in the 1980s, the team won its 11th championship.

The club advanced to the final of the Primera División against Toluca. The first match was played at Estadio Jalisco, in which Toluca and Las Chivas tied 1–1 with goals from Omar Bravo for Las Chivas and Bruno Marioni for Toluca. On 10 December 2006, Las Chivas played at Toluca's home stadium Estadio Nemesio Díez and won 2–1 (3–2 aggregate), thus becoming the Mexican League champions by holding 11 titles, the most titles of any team in the league at the time.

Apertura 2006 season Championship starting line-up

Bautista dedicated his goal and his team's victory to his mother, who had died shortly before. This championship was goalkeeper Oswaldo Sánchez's first in his career. After the Apertura 2006 championship the team had gone through a series of changes with the departures of Oswaldo Sánchez, Adolfo Bautista, and Omar Bravo who left to play in Spain. José Manuel de la Torre was fired in the Apertura 2007 tournament and replaced by Efraín Flores. After Flores's stint at the club Omar Arellano Nuño was appointed, but he only coached one league game and two Copa Libertadores matches. Arellano was replaced by Francisco Ramírez who had an unsuccessful period as coach by having the lowest percentage of effectiveness of all the coaches hired in the last seven years. Ramírez was fired and replaced by Raúl Arias, who also had a terrible run at the club. On 4 November 2009, Raúl Arias was fired and replaced by José Luis Real. Real lead the team to an explosive start of the 2010 Bicentenario tournament, winning the first 8 games in a row. Nevertheless, their winning streak was broken against the low table team, Chiapas F.C., losing by a score of 4–0. Under José Luis Real, Chivas saw many young and promising players blossoming even more rapidly than expected, including Javier Hernández, who was signed by English club Manchester United on 8 April; Hernandez additionally finished the tournament as joint-top scorer with 10 goals and named best forward.

On 30 July, Chivas played their inaugural match in the newly constructed Estadio Akron against Manchester United, as part of a deal where Javier Hernández was headed to the English club. Hernández played for Guadalajara in the first half, scoring within the first 8 minutes and switched sides in the second, unable to prevent a 3–2 defeat for Manchester United.

In August, Chivas played that year's Copa Libertadores finals against Brazilian club Sport Club Internacional but lost following an aggregate score of 5–3, becoming the second Mexican club to reach the tournament's final.

=== The New Dark Era (2011–2015) ===
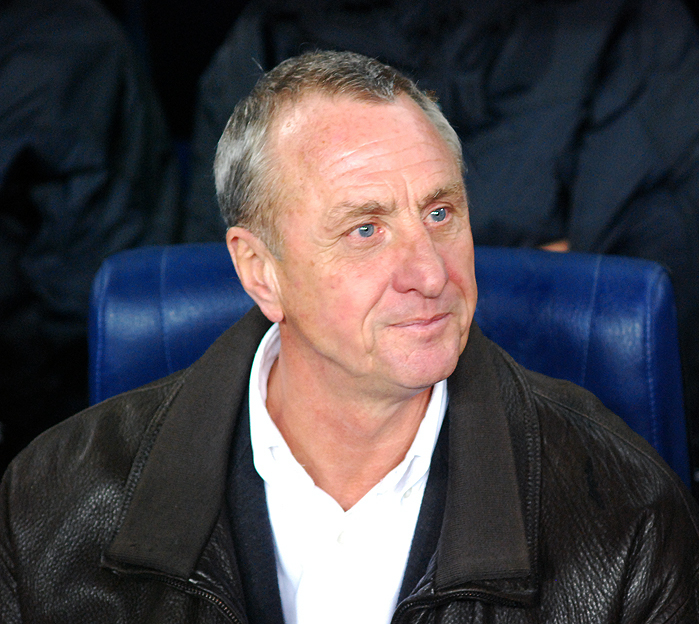
Johan Cruyff was sporting advisor of Club Guadalajara for nine months between February and December 2012.

In February 2012, Johan Cruyff was hired as the team's advisor. He would seldom visit Guadalajara, delegating many sporting responsibilities to his son-in-law and international director of the Cruyff Institute, Todd Beane. During his tenure, he recommended fellow countryman John van 't Schip for head coach and oversaw the club turf switch from synthetic to natural grass. Although the Apertura 2012 would include wins against rivals América and Atlas, the club would finish the regular season in eighth place and failed to move past the quarterfinals of the liguilla. In December 2012, the club sacked Cruyff and Beane, mainly due to the fact that the team was not improving. On 3 January 2012, van't Schip would be sacked, three days before the start of the Clausura 2013. Benjamin Galindo would be re-appointed as head coach on the same day. A season where the club struggled to win matches and gain momentum, Guadalajara would lose their six final league matches, resulting in a 17th-place finish. After matchday six of the Apertura 2013, a 4–2 home loss to Puebla, Galindo would be sacked. His tenure would end with 4 wins, 8 draws, and 10 losses in 22 league matches.

On 22 November 2013, Guadalajara placed multiple important players on the transfer list: Marco Fabián, Miguel Ponce, and veterans Luis Michel and Héctor Reynoso. On 25 November 2013, it was confirmed that José Luis Real would return to C.D. Guadalajara as head coach. Real showed improvement in the squad but was soon released after the team lost 4–0 at home to rivals América. On 2 April 2014, veteran manager Ricardo La Volpe was appointed as head coach. He was immediately released on 30 April 2014 supposedly due to having inappropriate conduct with a female staff member who later took legal action against him. On 12 May 2014, Carlos Bustos was appointed as head coach. On 2 October 2014, Bustos resigned after a 3–1 loss to Toluca. He left the team with two wins, four draws, and four losses. On 7 October 2014, former Mexico national team manager José Manuel de la Torre was appointed as head coach. The club started the 2015 season with a 2–1 loss against Chiapas F.C., and this result caused them to become tied in the last position of the Liga MX relegation table with Puebla. The very next week the club showed better character after a 2–1 win at home against Pumas UNAM in front of a very supportive, and completely sold-out crowd of fans. By game 12 of the 2015 Clausura season, Guadalajara managed to earn 21 points after winning crucial matches against teams such as Monterrey and relegation rivals Puebla. José Manuel de la Torre's strategic 4–2–3–1 formation proved effective during matches despite the fans' constant requests to use two strikers in the starting line-up. In game 13 of the season, Guadalajara defeated León in the Estadio Akron's 100th official match and went up to 1st place with 24 points. José Manuel de la Torre's effectiveness rose to 62.1%, the highest rate in the Clausura 2015 season. The club finished the 2015 Clausura in fifth place with the third best defense of the season, thus, qualifying to the playoffs for the first time since 2012. The team started the 2015 Apertura season with 4 points in 6 games and a squad plagued with injuries. On 14 September 2015, the club announced they had released De la Torre.

=== The Second Resurrection (2015–2018) ===
On 18 September 2015, the club officially presented Matías Almeyda as new manager, proclaiming he wanted to "awaken the giant." Almeyda immediately made his style of attacking football known by consecutively winning his first four matches, including the match against rivals América on 26 September 2015 by a score of 2–1 at the Estadio Azteca. On 4 November, Guadalajara won its third Copa MX after defeating León by a score of 1–0 via a 75th-minute header scored by defender Oswaldo Alanís. On 5 May, the club qualified for the Clausura 2016 Liguilla, earning 28 points and finishing in 5th place. After seasons of struggles and disappointing results, the club earned ninth place in the official relegation table for the 2016–2017 season due to their good performances throughout the 2015–2016 season, thus, starting their end of relegation troubles and surpassing clubs such as Cruz Azul and Club Tijuana.

On 10 July 2016, Chivas played their first ever Supercopa MX and won the title by defeating Veracruz 2–0, with goals from Orbelin Pineda and Omar Bravo, and qualifying to the Copa Libertadores for the first time since 2012, however, they would ultimately not participate due to the Copa Libertadores having a new format which Mexican teams could not adapt to, thus withdrawing from the competition.

On 19 April 2017, Chivas won their fourth Copa MX title, defeating Monarcas Morelia in a penalty shoot-out by a score of 3–1 after a goalless draw, with Guadalajara goalkeeper Miguel Jiménez stopping three consecutive penalties during the series. The following month, they played Atlas, Toluca and in the Clausura championship final was played against Tigres UANL, with Guadalajara winning their twelfth league title following an aggregate victory of 4–3 after two legs. With the capture of the Liga MX title, Chivas became the first team in Mexican history to win a Double in a single season on two different occasions and their first since the 1969–70 season.

On 25 April 2018, Guadalajara won the CONCACAF Champions League final against Major League Soccer side Toronto FC, defeating them 4–2 via penalty shoot-out, with all four players scoring, after a 3–3 aggregate draw. As a result of winning the title, Guadalajara qualified for the 2018 FIFA Club World Cup. On 11 June 2018, however, he left, citing differences with an executive. The following day, José Cardozo was appointed manager.

=== Downfall And Mediocrity (2018–2022) ===
In December, at the FIFA Club World Cup, they concluded their first participation in the tournament with a sixth-place finish after losing in a penalty shoot-out against Tunisian club Esperance Sportive de Tunis. In March 2019, Cardozo was let go following a losing streak of 4 matches and on 10 April, Tomás Boy was named as his successor.

On 26 November, Amaury Vergara officially presented Ricardo Peláez as the club's new sporting director and Luis Fernando Tena as the new manager.

Tena was let go on 9 August after going the first three matches of the Guardianes 2020 tournament scoreless, losing twice. Four days later, Víctor Manuel Vucetich was appointed as the new manager. Following a seventh place general table finish, they made it to the Guardianes 2020 semi-finals, losing 2–1 to eventual league winners León. In the Guardianes 2021, Chivas would end up getting knocked out in the reclassification round 4–2 to Pachuca.

=== Spanish Project (2022–2025) ===
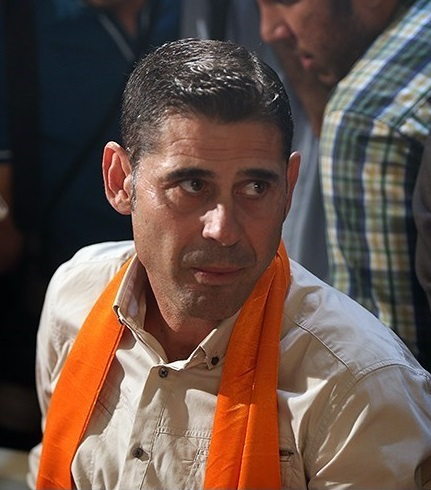
Fernando Hierro led Guadalajara's sporting project from October 2022 to June 2024.

On 10 October 2024, Chivas announced the departure of Fernando Gago, after his termination clause was activated, allowing him to join Boca Juniors. This was after weeks of speculation, especially during and after their derby loss to Atlas 2–3 on 5 October 2024.

On 2 December 2024, Óscar García Junyent was appointed as the head coach for the Clausura 2025 season. In the pre-season, the squad was reinforced by the likes of Mexican international Luis Romo, as well as the return of Alan Pulido. During the beginning of Clausura 2025, Chivas struggled to win games, only winning 11 points from their first 9 games, including a 3–1 loss to 17th placed San Luis on 26 February. On 30 January, García Junyent received a 3-match ban after kicking James Rodríguez in a match against León. On 28 February, Chivas announced the departure of the remaining Spanish sporting directors from Fernando Hierro's tenure. They were succeeded by Javier Mier. The following day, the new sporting directive announced the imminent departure of García Junyent. They appointed Gerardo Espinoza on 3 March for the remainder of the season. After a promising start against Club América winning 1–0 in the first leg of the Concacaf Champions Cup and drawing 0–0 in the Liga MX, they went on to lose 4–1 on aggregate in the second leg. They then would go on to have even poorer results which led to Guadalajara failing to qualify for the playoffs and finishing in 11th place. This led to the departure of Gerardo Espinoza.

=== Present (2025–) ===
After weeks of rumors regarding whom would be Guadalajara's next manager, on 13 May, Chivas seemingly agreed personal terms with Domenec Torrent. Just days before the contract was officially signed and announced, the deal fell through further fueling speculation regarding the next manager. Finally, on 26 May, Guadalajara announced Argentine manager Gabriel Milito. With him came new signings: Richard Ledezma, Diego Campillo, Efraín Álvarez, and Bryan González.

== Colors and crest ==
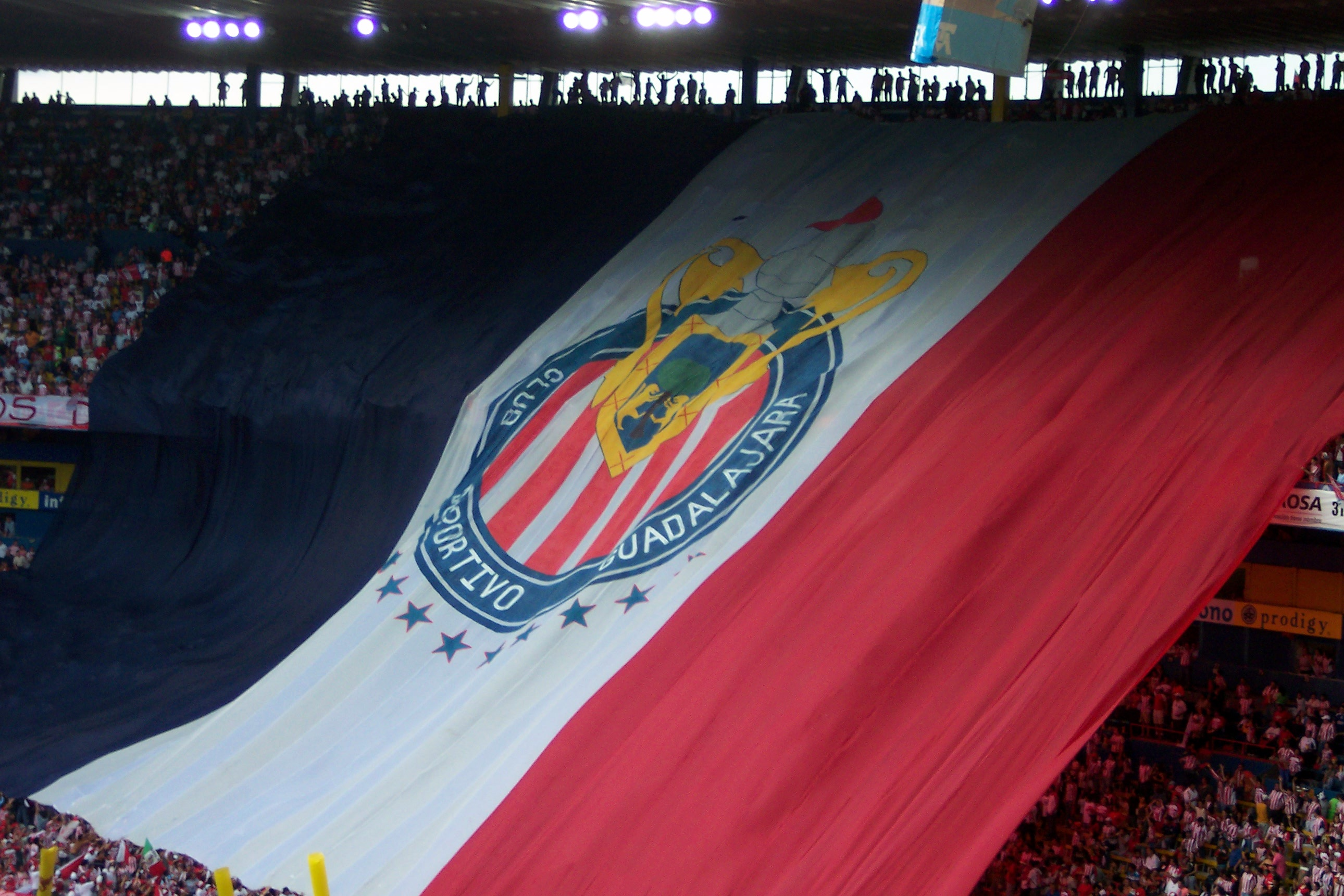
A tricolor banner of CD Guadalajara.

The flag of Bruges.

=== Colors ===
The club sports three colors (red, white, and blue) on their kit. Originally sporting an entirely white kit, in 1908, their kit was redesigned and modeled on that of the founder's favorite team, the Belgian Club Brugge K.V., borrowing the vertical stripes and color scheme of the Brugge strip in that era. (Club Brugge has since changed their colors). Some historians assert that the colors came from the French Tricolor because some of the club's first players were French, and as an homage to the factory where most of the players worked, Fábricas de Francia. Although the club philosophy soon changed to a Mexican-centric one, including renaming the club and adopting a Mexican-nationals only policy, the club retained the Bruges colors and pattern, in honor of the European founders' legacy at Chivas.

=== Crest ===
Club Guadalajara second crest. (1911)

Starting in 1917, the club used a crest which is more similar to its modern contemporary. The crest was composed of a vertical rectangle with a blue border, which inside included the five red and six white stripes of the club jersey. The center of the crest included a blue border of a diamond, alongside a "G" of the same color.

Coat of arms of Guadalajara.

Guadalajara's modern crest was designed in 1923 and uses as its base, the coat of arms of the city of Guadalajara, Jalisco. The crest was then complemented with a blue circle and the words Guadalajara, alongside the red stripes and white stripes from the 1917 crest. However, unlike the 1917 crest, there were only four red and five white stripes. In 1984, the crest would be changed to include the words Club Deportivo alongside Guadalajara, and one red and one white stripe were added to the crest, mirroring the 1917 crest. Over the years, stars representing each championship the team have won would be added to the crest, totaling twelve. The modern crest design is credited to brothers Everardo and Jose Espinosa, Angel Bolumar, and Antonio Villalvazo, all of whom were players or directors of the team during that time.

=== Nicknames ===
Chivas, Guadalajara's widely used nickname, claim to fame originates from a Liga Mayor match-up against Tampico Madero on 30 September 1948, as Guadalajara would win 1–0 at Parque Oblatos. Despite the win, the team's performances were criticized by attending fans, claiming that Club Guadalajara played like "Chivas Locas" (Crazy Goats). The next day, the performance was chided on local newspaper El Informador, who published a sports column written by editor Martín del Campo titled "Jugaron a las carreras y ganaron las chivas uno a cero" (In a game of races, the goats win one to zero). The nickname would be used by rival fans in a mocking manner, especially fans of Atlas. Months after the column was published, Guadalajara and Atlas would face each other in the final match day of the 1949 Liga Mayor. The match was noted as the first time Guadalajara debuted their mascot, having their starting eleven bring out a goat sporting Guadalajara's red and white striped jersey to the pitch (Chiva Rayada). The match would end with Guadalajara winning the match 1–3, preventing Atlas from winning the league, losing out by two points to León.

The origin of the nickname Rebaño Sagrado (Sacred Flock) can be traced to their first championship title in the 1956-57 Season. While at the parade in Zona Central, the team would go to visit Archbishop Garibi at the Guadalajara Cathedral. A fan of the club, the archbishop reportedly lifted his cassock to reveal that he had been wearing a Chivas jersey underneath it. The archbishop would later telegram Pope Pius XII, informing him that a squad composed exclusively of Mexican players had won the league. The pope, in a telegram dated 16 January 1957, replied to the archbishop, blessing the players of the football club:

"Most Excellent Archbishop: Augusto pontificates, graciously welcoming the filial feelings of the members of Club Fútbol Guadalajara. Respond to them when possible by sending them the implorable apostolic blessing."

- Current kit provider: Nike (Apertura 2026–).
- Current sponsors: Caliente.mx, Tecate, Omnilife, Volaris, Lubricantes Akron, Coca-Cola, eFootball, MG Motor, Mercado Pago, Powerade, Carl's Jr., Perdura, Casther, Megacable, Telcel, Mercedes-Benz, GNP Seguros, Axen Capital, Galletas Maribel, Chilchota Alimentos, Amazon Prime, Samsung and Transportes del Valle.

== Transfer policy ==
The decision to sign and field only Mexican-born players was made official in 1943, just before the start of the inaugural Liga Mayor season. Many Primera Fuerza clubs (namely Asturias and Real España) had been reliant on foreign talent to be competitive, so much so that the Mexican Football Federation implemented a policy limiting the signing of foreign talent. The policy excluded naturalized players, allowing clubs to field their established foreign players without restriction. Nevertheless, Guadalajara, in an effort to distinguish themselves from their rival, included the total restriction of foreign and naturalized talent in their own transfer policy.

Club president Ignacio López is claimed to have been responsible for the decision, later stating "Este Club vencerá o morirá, hasta el final, a base del talento y el esfuerzo de once jugadores mexicanos" (This club will win or die, until the end, based on the talent and effort of eleven Mexican players). However, Guadalajara had been fielding Mexican-only squads several years before the transfer policy was implemented. The last foreign player to have played for Guadalajara is claimed to have been the French Enrique Pellat in the 1926–27 season.

The club ideology is connected to Mexican nationalism and has been praised for promoting both local (Tapatío) and national (Mexican) talent. However, it has also been criticized as being discriminatory, especially in regard to their former subsidiary Chivas USA.

=== Dual nationals ===
Historically, the policy would only allow players born in Mexico and who were declared for the Mexico national team to be eligible to play for Guadalajara. Over time, Guadalajara had slowly softened their transfer restrictions, signing Mexican Americans such as Miguel Ángel Ponce, Isaác Brizuela, and Salvador Reyes Jr. (son of club legend Salvador "Chava" Reyes).

Mexican American players signed or linked to the club have been noted to declare for the Mexico national team shortly before signing for Guadalajara. Alejandro Zendejas, a former U-17 USMNT captain, alleges he was pressured into rejecting future USMNT call-ups and to play for El Tri before signing for Guadalajara. Brian Gutiérrez, who played two matches for the USMNT, declared his interest to make a one-time switch to towards El Tri on 6 November 2025, less than a month before Guadalajara finalized a deal to sign him from Chicago Fire.

Controversy would arise with the signing of Santiago Ormeño in 2022. A grandson of former Peruvian international goalkeeper and Guadalajara head coach Walter Ormeño, Santiago Ormeño was born in Mexico City but had represented Peru since 2021.

Goalkeeper Óscar Whalley was also benefited of the policy softening when he signed for Guadalajara in 2023. Born in Zaragoza, to an English father and a Mexican mother, Whalley holds Mexican citizenship from his maternal side via jus sanguinis.

== Stadium ==
=== Parque Oblatos ===
From the 1930s to 1960, Guadalajara played in a small, stadium known as "Parque Oblatos". Originally built for Oro, the inaugural match was a friendly match between Oro and Chivas. Soon after the friendly match, Chivas would move into the stadium, as would Atlas. In the 1950-51 season, Atlas won the Primera División title by one point, often accredited to their 1–0 win over Chivas at Parque Oblatos in the final match day. In the 1954-55 season, Chivas would draw 3–3 against Zacatepec at Parque Oblatos in the fourth match day. Chivas would finish runner-up that season, losing the title to Zacatepec by two points. In the 1956-57 season, Chivas would win their ever first title after defeating Irapuato 1–0 at Parque Oblatos, with a stoppage time winner from Salvador Reyes. In both the 1958-59 and 1959-60 seasons, Chivas would win consecutive division titles in the final match day at Parque Oblatos. As a result, the stadium held significant importance to both Chivas and Jaliscan football heritage. However, by the 1950s, the stadium's official seating capacity of 10,000 failed to meet demand for match day tickets, with derby matches often having total actual attendances of over 15,000. By 1954, this had motivated Chivas, Atlas, and Oro to form Clubes Unidos de Jalisco, with the goal of building and maintaining a new state-of-the-art stadium that would more adequately meet the demand for Tapatío football.

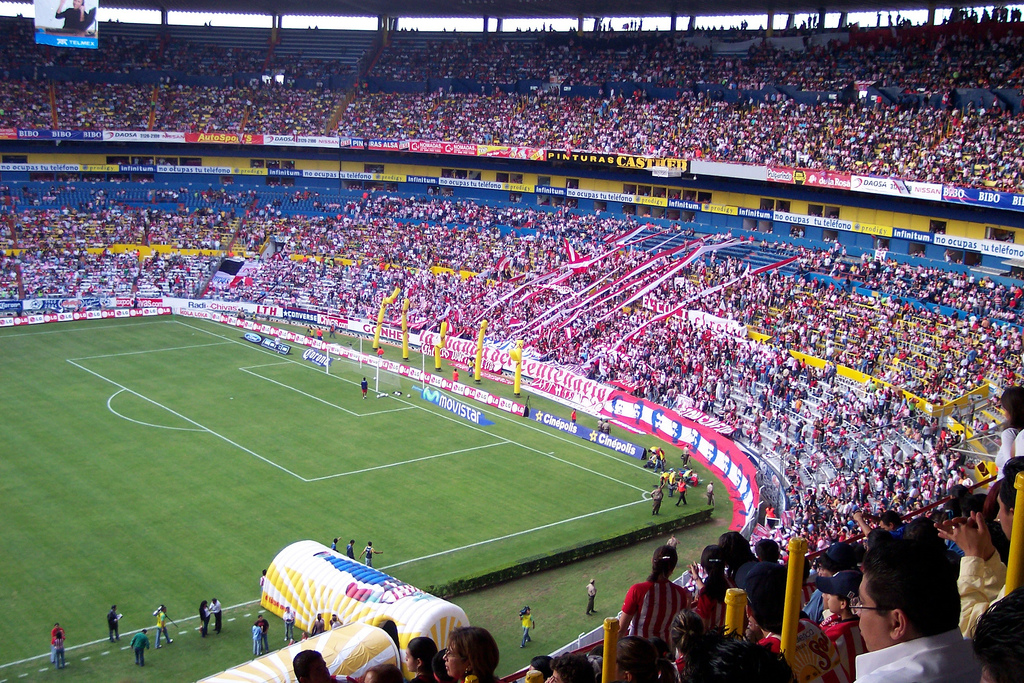
View of Estadio Jalisco.

=== Estadio Jalisco ===
Guadalajara next shared the Estadio Jalisco with their biggest town rivals Atlas. Estadio Jalisco was inaugurated on 31 January 1960. It was host for eight games in the 1970 FIFA World Cup, six group-stage matches, and one each in the quarterfinals and semifinals. The stadium was host for nine games in the 1986 FIFA World Cup, six group-stage matches, one round-of-16 match, one quarterfinal, and one semifinal.

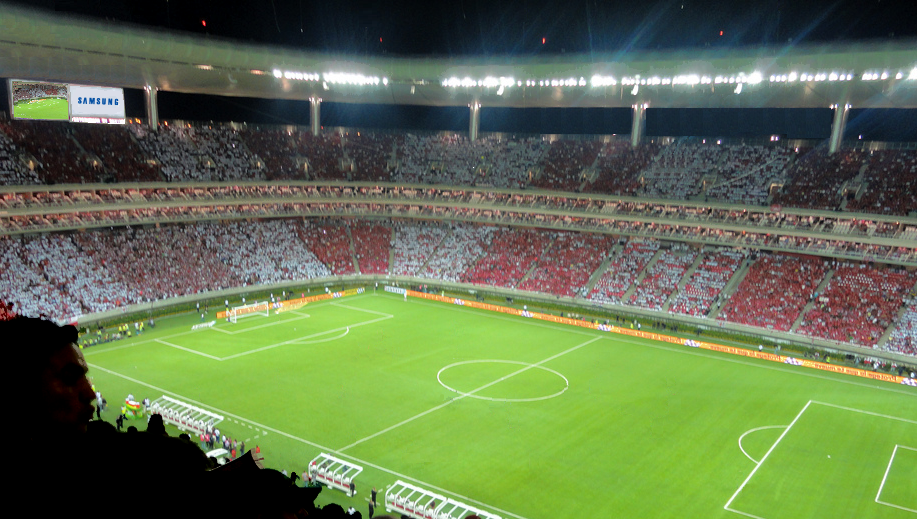
Inside view of Estadio Akron.

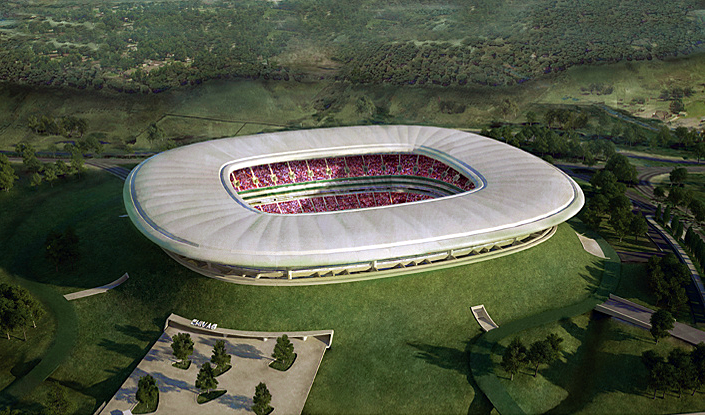
Volcano Stadium, Chivas Omnilife, Guadalajara, Mexico

=== Estadio Akron ===
In 2010, Chivas's new home field was completed. Estadio Omnilife (then named after the nutrition company owned by Vergara) was designed to look like a volcano with a cloud on top. The idea of the design is to integrate the stadium with nature because of its proximity to La Primavera Biosphere Reserve. It is also used for conventions and as a Business JVC Center. Construction of the stadium began in May 2007 and concluded in July 2010. The stadium seats are red, except for the loge seats that are white. It has a large main entrance and 18 exits. Total seating capacity is 49,850, which includes 330 suites with capacities of nine to 13 guests. An underground parking lot is available for suite renters, which holds up to 850 cars, and parking outside the stadium has capacity for 8,000 cars. The new stadium also has a store, a museum, and various food and beverage concessions. The stadium's opening date was 30 July 2010. The inaugural match was a friendly between Chivas and Manchester United that Chivas won 3–2, with the first goal scored by Javier "Chicharito" Hernández, who had just been transferred from the former to the latter. In March 2016, the stadium was renamed Estadio Chivas. On 10 November 2017, it was announced that Mexican automotive oil firm Grupo Akron would buy the naming rights of Estadio Chivas. On 15 December 2017, the stadium was officially renamed Estadio Akron.

== Rivalries ==
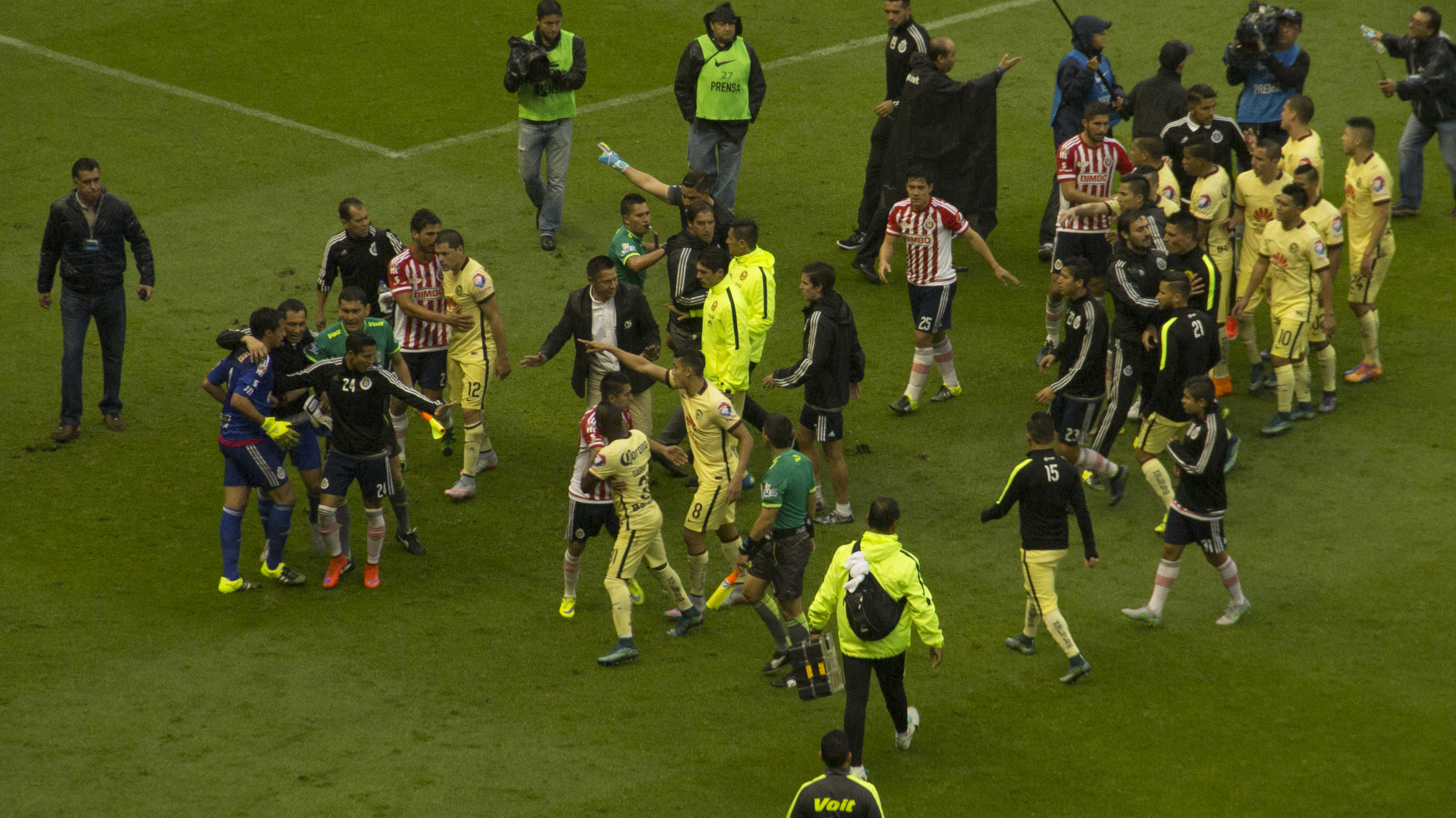
Chivas (in red and white) during the 1–2 win against Club América at Estadio Azteca on 26 September 2015.

=== El Súper Clásico ===
Chivas has developed two important rivalries over the years. Perhaps its most intense rivalry is with Mexico City-based Club América. Their meetings, which have become known as El Súper Clásico, are played at least twice a year and signal a national derby. The first confrontation between them ended with a victory for Guadalajara with a score of 3–0. The rivalry began after the second match when Club América defeated Guadalajara with a score of 7–2. Although the defeat was by a large margin it was almost two decades before the rivalry became The Clásico. One of the reasons why these two teams are rivals is because in 1983 and 1986 they brawled with each other, raising excitement among the fans. To this day, El Clásico de Clásicos continues. El Súper Clásico was ranked 12th on FourFourTwo's 50 biggest derbies list.

=== El Clásico Tapatío ===
Guadalajara's oldest rivalry is with cross-city rivals Atlas F.C., with whom they contest the Clásico Tapatío. Dating back to 1916, it's considered the oldest football derby in Mexico. The rivalry historically reflected social differences within Guadalajara, with Guadalajara being associated with the city's working and middle classe, while Atlas represented a more affluent population. The clubs formerly shared the Estadio Jalisco before Guadalajara moved to Estadio Akron in 2010. The derby remains one of Mexican football's most traditional rivalries and is closely associated with sporting supremacy in Guadalajara.

== Support ==
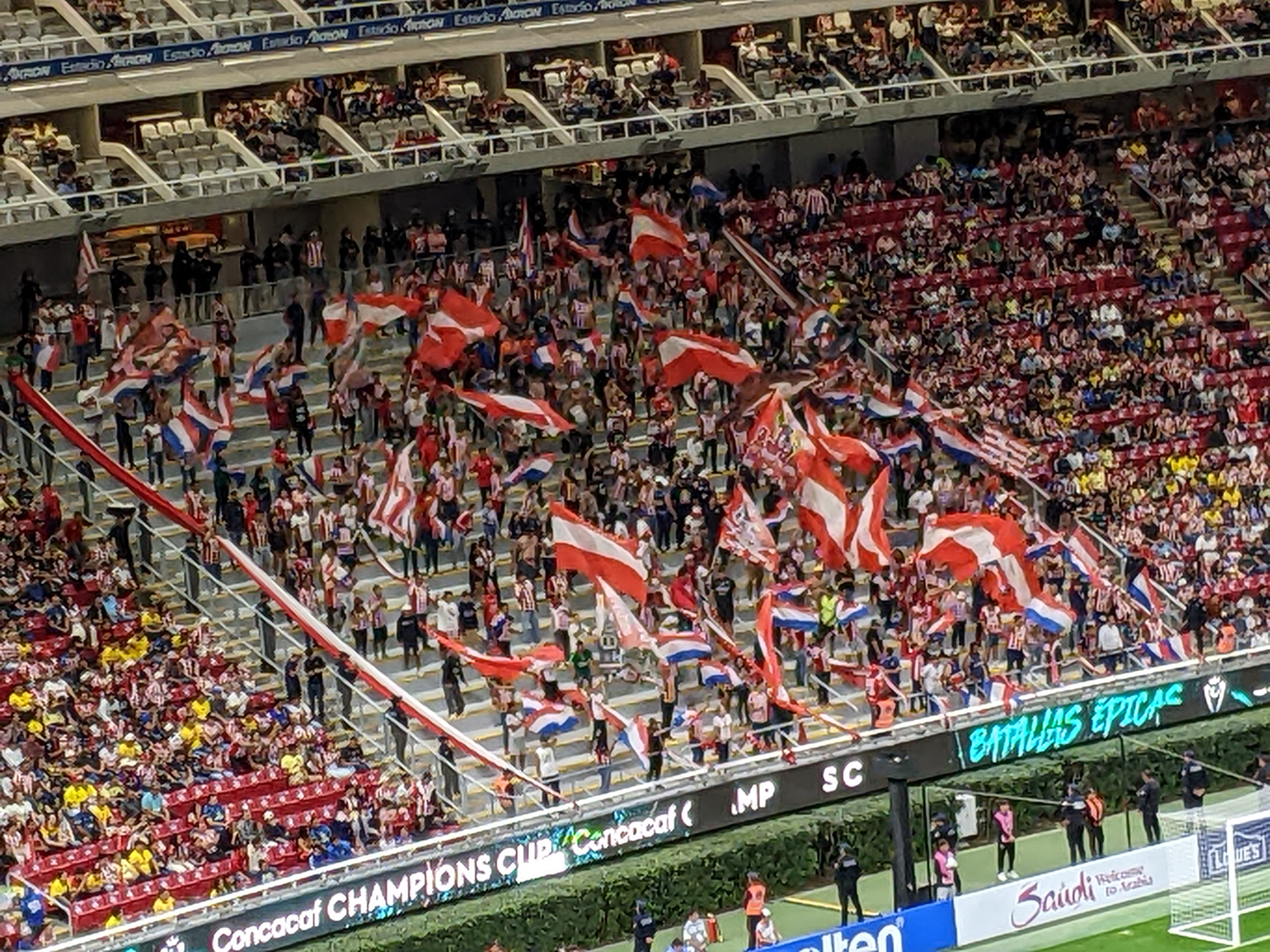
Stand tribune of Chivas fans in Estadio Akron during a Súper Clásico against Club América.

The fans of what some surveys say is the most popular football team in the country remain loyal to a club that has only won four championship titles (in a period of more than 50 years) since its heyday in 1970.

In addition to the general enthusiasm that still lingers from the era of the Campeonísimo – the affection also stems from the fact that Chivas is the only first division club in Mexico to field exclusively local players. Unlike other major clubs, Chivas rarely purchased Mexican players from rival Mexican teams, nor did it recruit equally from all parts of the country. Its personnel policy has focused primarily on its home region in western Mexico, particularly the state of Jalisco, with a long-standing tradition of developing its own young talent.

=== Barra Brava ===
Chivas Guadalajara has 3 supporters' group (barra bravas), La Irreverente, Barra Insurgencia and Legión 1908.

== Players ==
=== First-team squad ===
As of 23 September 2026

Note: Flags indicate national team as defined under FIFA eligibility rules; some limited exceptions apply. Players may hold more than one non-FIFA nationality.

No.	Pos.	Nation	Player
1	GK	MEX	Raúl Rangel
2	DF	MEX	José Castillo
3	DF	MEX	Diego Campillo
4	DF	MEX	Miguel Tapias
5	DF	MEX	Bryan González
6	MF	MEX	Omar Govea
7	MF	MEX	Luis Romo (captain)
9	FW	MEX	Ángel Sepúlveda
10	MF	MEX	Efraín Álvarez
11	MF	MEX	Brian Gutiérrez
13	GK	ESP	Óscar Whalley
14	MF	MEX	Hugo Camberos

No.	Pos.	Nation	Player
16	DF	MEX	Luis Rey
17	FW	MEX	Ricardo Marín
18	MF	MEX	Jonathan Pérez
19	MF	MEX	Kevin Castañeda
23	DF	USA	Daniel Aguirre
24	DF	MEX	Miguel Gómez
25	MF	MEX	Roberto Alvarado
28	MF	MEX	Fernando González
30	MF	MEX	Santiago Sandoval
31	GK	MEX	Sebastián Liceaga
33	MF	MEX	Jordán Carrillo
37	DF	MEX	Richard Ledezma

=== Youth squad ===
Note: Flags indicate national team as defined under FIFA eligibility rules; some limited exceptions apply. Players may hold more than one non-FIFA nationality.

No.	Pos.	Nation	Player
46	DF	MEX	Carlos Hernández
56	DF	MEX	Ángel Chávez

No.	Pos.	Nation	Player
57	FW	MEX	Jesús Hernández
182	MF	MEX	Leonel Calderón

=== Out on loan ===
Note: Flags indicate national team as defined under FIFA eligibility rules; some limited exceptions apply. Players may hold more than one non-FIFA nationality.

No.	Pos.	Nation	Player
—	DF	USA	Daniel Flores (at Phoenix Rising)
—	DF	MEX	Francisco Méndez (at Necaxa)
—	DF	MEX	Alan Mozo (at Cruz Azul)
—	DF	MEX	Diego Ochoa (at Necaxa)
—	DF	MEX	Gilberto Sepúlveda (at Juárez)
—	DF	MEX	Leonardo Sepúlveda (at UdeG)

No.	Pos.	Nation	Player
—	DF	MEX	Abraham Villegas (at León)
—	MF	MEX	Fidel Barajas (at Monterey Bay)
—	MF	MEX	Érick Gutiérrez (at Toluca)
—	FW	USA	Cade Cowell (at New York Red Bulls)
—	FW	MEX	Teun Wilke (at Fortaleza)

=== Reserve teams ===
Tapatío
Reserve team that plays in the Liga de Expansión MX in the second level of the Mexican league system.

Álamos F.C.
Reserve team that plays in the Liga TDP, the fourth level of the Mexican league system.

=== Player records ===
All players are Mexican unless otherwise noted.

==== Top scorers ====
Primera División

Most league goals (single tournament)
Rank	Name	Season	Goals
1	Adalberto López	1953–54	21
2	Salvador Reyes	1970–71	21
3	Crescencio Gutiérrez	1956–57	19
4	Alan Pulido	Apertura 2019	12
5	Armando González	Apertura 2025	12
6	Omar Bravo	Clausura 2007	11
7	Javier Hernández	Bicentenario 2010	10

==== All-time records ====
Players in bold are still active with the team.

Most league goals scored
Rank	Name	Nationality	Goals
1	Omar Bravo	(Mexico)	132
2	Salvador Reyes	(Mexico)	122
3	Eduardo de la Torre	(Mexico)	90
4	Benjamín Galindo	(Mexico)	78
5	Crescencio Gutiérrez & Maximiano Prieto	(Mexico)	72
6	Javier de la Torre	(Mexico)	70
7	Javier Valdivia	(Mexico)	69
8	Francisco Jara	(Mexico)	68
9	Ramón Morales	(Mexico)	66
10	Isidoro Díaz	(Mexico)	58

Most league appearances
Rank	Name	Nationality	Apps
1	Juan Jasso	(Mexico)	433
2	José Villegas	(Mexico)	428
3	Javier Ledesma	(Mexico)	419
4	Demetrio Madero	(Mexico)	413
5	Omar Bravo & Ramón Morales	(Mexico)	382
6	Héctor Reynoso	(Mexico)	368
7	Sergio Lugo	(Mexico)	328
8	Alberto Medina	(Mexico)	323
9	Sabás Ponce	(Mexico)	307
10	Jaime Gómez	(Mexico)	301

=== Retired numbers ===
- **8** – (Mexico) Salvador Reyes (forward, 1953–1967, 2008) – retired in January 2013.
- **12** – (Mexico) Dedicated to fans as the 12th player
- **22** – (Mexico) José Martínez González (midfielder, 1970–81) (posthumous)

== Personnel ==
=== Coaching staff ===
Position	Staff
Manager	(Argentina) Gabriel Milito
Assistant manager	(Argentina) Leandro Ávila
Goalkeeper coach	(Mexico) Víctor Hugo Hernández
Fitness coaches	(Argentina) Sergio Di Bartolo
Fitness coaches	(Mexico) Adrián Cruz
Physiotherapist	(Mexico) Mario Durán
Team doctors	(Mexico) Luis Gallardo
Team doctors	(Mexico) Victor Camacho

=== Management ===
Position	Staff
Chairman	(Mexico) Amaury Vergara
General Director	(Mexico) Alejandro Manzo
Sporting Director	(Mexico) Javier Mier
Director of Institutional Football	(Mexico) Mariano Varela
Head of Professional Youth Football	(Mexico) Erich Hernández
Basic Forces Coordinator	(Mexico) Luis Manuel Díaz
Children's Football Coordinator	(Mexico) Carlos Nápoles

=== Managerial History ===
Date	Name
1943–44	(Mexico) Fausto Prieto
1943–45	(Chile) Nemesio Tamayo
1946	(Mexico) José Fernández Troncoso
1946–49	(Hungary) Gyorgy Orth
1949	(Mexico) José Antonio Guerrero Barreiro
1949–50	(Mexico) Fausto Prieto
1950–51	(Scotland) William Reaside
1951–56	(Argentina) José María Casullo
1956	(Mexico) Javier de la Torre
1956–57	(Uruguay) Donaldo Ross
1957–59	(Hungary) Árpád Fekete
1959	(Mexico) Javier de la Torre
1959–60	(Hungary) Árpád Fekete
1960–70	(Mexico) Javier de la Torre
1970	(Mexico) Jesús Ponce
1970–73	(Mexico) Javier de la Torre
1973	(Mexico) Héctor Hernández
1973–74	(Peru) Walter Ormeño
1974	(Mexico) Héctor Hernández
1974–75	(Mexico) Jesús Ponce
1975	(Spain) Héctor Rial
1975–76	(Uruguay) Horacio Troche
1976–78	(Mexico) Jesús Ponce
1978–79	(Mexico) Diego Mercado
1979–80	(Uruguay) Carlos Miloc
1980–82	(Mexico) Diego Mercado
1982–89	(Mexico) Alberto Guerra
1 July 1989 – 30 June 1991	(Argentina) Ricardo La Volpe
1990	(Hungary) Árpád Fekete
1990	(Mexico) Jesús Bracamontes
1990–91	(Argentina) Miguel Ángel López
1991–93	(Mexico) Jesús Bracamontes
1993	(Mexico) Demetrio Madero
1993–95	(Mexico) Alberto Guerra
1 July 1995 – 30 Oct 1995	(Argentina) Osvaldo Ardiles
4 Nov 1995 – 30 June 1996	(Netherlands) Leo Beenhakker
1 July 1996 – 30 June 2000	(Brazil) Ricardo Ferretti
1 July 2000 – 22 Aug 2000	(Mexico) Hugo Hernández
2000–01	(Mexico) Jesús Bracamontes
2001	(Mexico) Jorge Dávalos
2001–02	(Argentina) Oscar Ruggeri
1 July 2002 – 31 Dec 2002	(Mexico) Daniel Guzmán
1 Jan 2003 – 29 Sept 2003	(Mexico) Eduardo de la Torre
1 Oct 2003 – 30 April 2004	(Netherlands) Hans Westerhof
1 July 2004 – 14 Aug 2005	(Mexico) Benjamín Galindo
2005	(Mexico) Juan Carlos Ortega
2005	(Spain) Xabier Azkargorta
1 Jan 2006 – 16 March 2006	(Netherlands) Hans Westerhof
17 March 2006 – 24 Sept 2007	(Mexico) José Manuel de la Torre
28 Sept 2007 – 23 March 2009	(Mexico) Efraín Flores
30 March 2009 – 16 April 2009	(Mexico) Omar Arellano Nuño
16 April 2009 – 12 Sept 2009	(Mexico) Paco Ramírez
16 Sept 2009 – 3 Nov 2009	(Mexico) Raúl Arias
3 Nov 2009 – 4 Oct 2011	(Mexico) José Luis Real
4 Oct 2011 – 22 Jan 2012	(Mexico) Fernando Quirarte
25 Jan 2012 – 19 April 2012	(Mexico) Ignacio Ambríz
19 April 2012 – 30 June 2012	(Mexico) Alberto Coyote (Int.)
1 July 2012 – 3 Jan 2013	(Netherlands) John van 't Schip
3 Jan 2013 – 18 Aug 2013	(Mexico) Benjamín Galindo
19 Aug 2013 – 24 Nov 2013	(Mexico) Juan Carlos Ortega
25 Nov 2013 – 2 April 2014	(Mexico) José Luis Real
2 April 2014 – 30 April 2014	(Argentina) Ricardo La Volpe
12 May 2014 – 2 Oct 2014	(Argentina) Carlos Bustos
3 Oct 2014 – 6 Oct 2014	(Mexico) Ramón Morales (Int.)
7 Oct 2014 – 14 Sept 2015	(Mexico) José Manuel de la Torre
15 Sept 2015	(Mexico) Ramón Morales (Int.)
15 Sept 2015 – 11 June 2018	(Argentina) Matías Almeyda
12 June 2018 – 31 March 2019	(Paraguay) José Cardozo
6 Oct 2018 – April 2019	(Mexico) Alberto Coyote (Int.)
10 April 2019 – 26 September 2019	(Mexico) Tomás Boy
26 September 2019 – 9 August 2020	(Mexico) Luis Fernando Tena
9 August 2020 – 13 August 2020	(Mexico) Marcelo Michel Leaño (Int.)
13 August 2020 – 19 September 2021	(Mexico) Víctor Manuel Vucetich
19 September 2021 – 14 April 2022	(Mexico) Marcelo Michel Leaño
14 April 2022 – 9 October 2022	(Mexico) Ricardo Cadena (Int.)
31 October 2022 – 15 December 2023	(Serbia) Veljko Paunović
20 December 2023 – 10 October 2024	(Argentina) Fernando Gago
10 October 2024 – 21 November 2024	(Mexico) Arturo Ortega (Int.)
2 December 2024 - 3 March 2025	(Spain) Óscar García Junyent
3 March 2025 - 21 April 2025	(Mexico) Gerardo Espinoza
26 May 2025 - Present	(Argentina) Gabriel Milito

=== Presidential History ===
Years	Name	Years	Name
1908 - 1911	(Mexico) Rafael Higinio Orozco	1954 - 1956	(Mexico) Antonio Levy Villegas
1911 - 1914	(Mexico) Georgio Orozco	1956 - 1958	(Mexico) Evaristo Cárdenas
1915 - 1918	(Mexico) Ramón J. Fregoso	1959 - 1961	(Mexico) Federico González Obregón
1919 - 1922	(Mexico) José Fernando Espinosa	1961 - 1963	(Mexico) Alberto Esponda Macías
1923 - 1925	(Mexico) Salvador Mejía	1963 - 1967	(Mexico) Jorge Agnesi Deassle
1926 - 1927	(Mexico) Ramón J. Fregoso	1967 - 1973	(Mexico) Enrique Ladrón de Guevara
1928	(Mexico) Juan Billón	1973 - 1975	(Mexico) Jaime Ruiz Llaguno
1929 - 1930	(Mexico) Everardo S. Espinosa	1975 - 1977	(Mexico) Evaristo Cárdenas
1931 - 1932	(Mexico) Salvador Mejía	1977 - 1983	(Mexico) Alfonso Cuevas Calvillo
1933 - 1934	(Mexico) José Proto García	1983 - 1985	(Mexico) Carlos González Lozano
1935 - 1936	(Mexico) José Fernando Espinosa	1985 - 1988	(Mexico) Marcelino García Paniagua
1936 - 1937	(Mexico) Ramiro Álvarez Tostado	1988 - 1990	(Mexico) Sergio Ruiz Lacroix
1937 - 1938	(Mexico) J. Armando Suárez	1990 - 1991	(Mexico) Francisco González Paul
1939 - 1940	(Mexico) J. Antonio Villalvazo	1991 - 1993	(Mexico) Aurelio Martínez Flores
1941	(Mexico) Pedro Ramírez	1993 - 1995	(Mexico) Jorge Alarcón Collignon
1941 - 1943	(Mexico) J. Jesús Mendoza Gámez	1996 - 1999	(Mexico) Rafael Jazo Ceballos
1943	(Mexico) Donato Soltero Leal	1999 - 2002	(Mexico) Ángel Francisco Cárdenas Moreno
1944 - 1948	(Mexico) Ignacio López Hernández	2002 - 2019	(Mexico) Jorge Carlos Vergara Madrigal
1949 - 1953	(Mexico) Federico González Obregón	2019 -	(Mexico) Amaury Vergara Zatarain

== Honours ==
Domestic
Type	Competition	Titles	Seasons	Runners-up
Top level FMF	Liga MX	12	1956–57, 1958–59, 1959–60, 1960–61, 1961–62, 1963–64, 1964–65, 1969–70, 1986–87, Ver–1997, Ape–2006, Cla–2017	1951–52, 1954–55, 1962–63, 1968–69, Mex–1970, 1982–83, 1983–84, Inv–1998, Cla–2004, Cla–2023
Top level FMF	Copa MX	4	1962–63, 1969–70, Ape–2015, Cla–2017	1947–48, 1950–51, 1951–52, 1953–54, 1954–55, 1966–67, Cla–2015, Ape–2016
Top level FMF	Campeón de Campeones	7^{s}	1957, 1959, 1960, 1961, 1964, 1965, 1970	1962, 1963, 2017
Top level FMF	Supercopa MX	1^{s}	2016	—
International
Type	Competition	Titles	Seasons	Runners-up
Continental CONCACAF	CONCACAF Champions Cup	2	1962, 2018	1963, 2007
Continental CONMEBOL	CONMEBOL Libertadores	0	—	2010
Regional Central America CCCF	Championship of Central America and Mexico	0	—	1959

Notes

- record
- ^{s} shared record

== International records ==
Season	Competition	Round	Club	Home	Away	Agg. / Pos.
1959	Campeonato Centroamericano	Round-Robin	(El Salvador) FAS	1–1		
1959	Campeonato Centroamericano	Round-Robin	(Honduras) Olimpia	3–2		
1959	Campeonato Centroamericano	Round-Robin	(Costa Rica) Alajuelense	1–1		
1962	CONCACAF Champions' Cup	First round	(Costa Rica) Herediano	2–0	3–0	5–0
1962	CONCACAF Champions' Cup	Final	(Guatemala) Comunicaciones	5–0	1–0	6–0
1963	CONCACAF Champions' Cup	Second round	(United States) New York Hungaria	2–0	0–0	2–0
1963	CONCACAF Champions' Cup	Semi-finals	(Costa Rica) Saprissa	2–0	1–0	3–0
1963	CONCACAF Champions' Cup	Final	(Haiti) Racing Haïtien	Cancelled^{1}		
1984	CONCACAF Champions' Cup	First round	(El Salvador) C.D. Águila	3–0	4–2	7–2
1984	CONCACAF Champions' Cup	Second round	(United States) Jacksonville Tea Men	Walkover^{2}		
1984	CONCACAF Champions' Cup	Third round	(Guatemala) Comunicaciones	4–1	0–0	4–1
1984	CONCACAF Champions' Cup	Fourth round	(United States) New York Pancyprian-Freedoms	Cancelled^{3}		
1985	CONCACAF Champions' Cup	First round	(Mexico) América	1–1	1–3	2–4
1997	CONCACAF Champions' Cup	Quarter-final	(Costa Rica) C.S. Cartaginés	1–0		
1997	CONCACAF Champions' Cup	Semi-final	(Mexico) Cruz Azul	2–3		
1997	CONCACAF Champions' Cup	Third place	(United States) D.C. United	2–2 ^{4}		
1998	Copa Libertadores	Pre-Libertadores	(Venezuela) Atlético Zulia	4–1	3–2	1st
1998	Copa Libertadores	Pre-Libertadores	(Venezuela) Caracas	4–1	1–1	1st
1998	Copa Libertadores	Group 2	(Mexico) América	0–1	0–2	4th
1998	Copa Libertadores	Group 2	(Brazil) Grêmio	1–0	0–2	4th
1998	Copa Libertadores	Group 2	(Brazil) Vasco da Gama	1–0	0–2	4th
2000	Copa Merconorte	Group A	(Colombia) América de Cali	1–1	0–1	1st
2000	Copa Merconorte	Group A	(Venezuela) Estudiantes de Mérida	4–0	3–2	1st
2000	Copa Merconorte	Group A	(Ecuador) El Nacional	1–0	3–3	1st
2000	Copa Merconorte	Semi-finals	(Colombia) Atlético Nacional	1–1	3–3	4–4 (2–4 p)
2001	CONCACAF Giants Cup	Quarter-finals	(Guatemala) Comunicaciones	1–1	1–3	2–4
2001	Copa Merconorte	Group B	(Colombia) Millonarios	3–0	0–2^{5}	4th
2001	Copa Merconorte	Group B	(Venezuela) Deportivo Italchacao	0–2^{5}	0–2	4th
2001	Copa Merconorte	Group B	(United States) MetroStars	0–2^{5}	0–2^{5}	4th
2005	Copa Libertadores	Preliminary round	(Peru) Cienciano	3–1	5–1	8–2
2005	Copa Libertadores	Group 7	(Chile) Cobreloa	3–1	3–1	1st
2005	Copa Libertadores	Group 7	(Colombia) Once Caldas	0–0	2–4	1st
2005	Copa Libertadores	Group 7	(Argentina) San Lorenzo	2–1	0–0	1st
2005	Copa Libertadores	Round of 16	(Mexico) Pachuca	3–1	1–1	4–2
2005	Copa Libertadores	Quarter-finals	(Argentina) Boca Juniors	4–0	0–0	4–0
2005	Copa Libertadores	Semi-finals	(Brazil) Atlético Paranaense	2–2	0–3	2–5
2006	Copa Libertadores	First stage	(Chile) Colo-Colo	5–3	3–1	8–4
2006	Copa Libertadores	Group 1	(Peru) Cienciano	0–0	1–0	2nd
2006	Copa Libertadores	Group 1	(Venezuela) Caracas	1–1	0–0	2nd
2006	Copa Libertadores	Group 1	(Brazil) São Paulo	2–1	2–1	2nd
2006	Copa Libertadores	Round of 16	(Colombia) Santa Fe	3–0	1–3	4–3
2006	Copa Libertadores	Quarter-finals	(Argentina) Vélez Sarsfield	0–0	2–1	2–1
2006	Copa Libertadores	Semi-finals	(Brazil) São Paulo	0–1	0–3	0–4
2007	CONCACAF Champions' Cup	Quarter-finals	(Trinidad and Tobago) W Connection	3–0	1–2	4–2
2007	CONCACAF Champions' Cup	Semi-finals	(United States) D.C. United	2–1	1–1	3–2
2007	CONCACAF Champions' Cup	Final	(Mexico) Pachuca	2–2	0–0	2–2 (a.e.t.) (6–7 p)
2007	Copa Sudamericana	Round of 16	(United States) D.C. United	1–0	2–1	2–2 (a)
2007	Copa Sudamericana	Quarter-finals	(Argentina) Arsenal	1–3	0–0	1–3
2008	Copa Libertadores	Group 6	(Bolivia) San José	2–0	3–0	3rd
2008	Copa Libertadores	Group 6	(Brazil) Santos	3–2	0–1	3rd
2008	Copa Libertadores	Group 6	(Colombia) Cúcuta Deportivo	0–1	0–1	3rd
2008	Copa Sudamericana	First Stage	(Venezuela) Aragua	1–1	2–1	3–2
2008	Copa Sudamericana	Round of 16	(Brazil) Atlético Paranaense	2–2	4–3	6–5
2008	Copa Sudamericana	Quarter-finals	(Argentina) River Plate	2–2	2–1	4–3
2008	Copa Sudamericana	Semi-finals	(Brazil) Internacional	0–2	0–4	0–6
2009	Copa Libertadores	Group 6	(Argentina) Lanús	0–0	1–1	2nd
2009	Copa Libertadores	Group 6	(Chile) Everton	6–2	1–1	2nd
2009	Copa Libertadores	Group 6	(Venezuela) Caracas	1–0	0–2	2nd
2009	Copa Libertadores	Round of 16	(Brazil) São Paulo	Walkover^{6}		
2010	Copa Libertadores^{6}	Round of 16	(Argentina) Vélez Sarsfield	3–0	0–2	3–2
2010	Copa Libertadores^{6}	Quarter-finals	(Paraguay) Libertad	3–0	0–2	3–2
2010	Copa Libertadores^{6}	Semi-finals	Universidad de Chile	1–1	2–0	3–1
2010	Copa Libertadores^{6}	Final	(Brazil) Internacional	1–2	2–3	3–5
2012	Copa Libertadores	Group 7	(Ecuador) Deportivo Quito	1–1	0–5	4th
2012	Copa Libertadores	Group 7	(Argentina) Vélez Sarsfield	0–2	0–3	4th
2012	Copa Libertadores	Group 7	(Uruguay) Defensor Sporting	1–0	0–1	4th
2012	CONCACAF Champions League	Group 8	(Guatemala) Xelajú	2–1	0–1	2nd
2012	CONCACAF Champions League	Group 8	(Trinidad and Tobago) W Connection	4–0	1–1	2nd
2018	CONCACAF Champions League	Round of 16	(Dominican Republic) Cibao	5–0	2–0	7–0
2018	CONCACAF Champions League	Quarter-finals	(United States) Seattle Sounders FC	3–0	0–1	3–1
2018	CONCACAF Champions League	Semi-finals	(United States) New York Red Bulls	1–0	0–0	1–0
2018	CONCACAF Champions League	Final	(Canada) Toronto FC	1–2	2–1	3–3 (4–2 p)
2018	FIFA Club World Cup	Second round	(Japan) Kashima Antlers	2–3		
2018	FIFA Club World Cup	Fifth place	(Tunisia) Espérance de Tunis	1–1 (5–6 p)		
2023	Leagues Cup	Central 3	(United States) FC Cincinnati	1–3		3rd
2023	Leagues Cup	Central 3	(United States) Sporting Kansas City	0–1		3rd
2024	CONCACAF Champions Cup	Round One	(Canada) Forge FC	2–1	3–1	5–2
2024	CONCACAF Champions Cup	Round of 16	(Mexico) América	0–3	3–2	3–5
2024	Leagues Cup	West 2	(United States) San Jose Earthquakes	1–1 (3–4 p)		3rd
2024	Leagues Cup	West 2	(United States) LA Galaxy	2–2 (4–5 p)		3rd
2025	CONCACAF Champions Cup	Round One	(Dominican Republic) Cibao	3–0	1–1	4–1
2025	CONCACAF Champions Cup	Round of 16	(Mexico) América	1–0	0–4	1–4
2025	Leagues Cup	Eastern 3	(United States) New York Red Bulls	0–1		6th
2025	Leagues Cup	Eastern 3	(United States) Charlotte FC	2–2 (4–2 p)		6th
2025	Leagues Cup	Eastern 3	(United States) FC Cincinnati	1–2		6th

^{1} Guadalajara were forced to withdraw as they were on a tour in Europe during the finals' schedule.
^{2} Jacksonville withdrew, Guadalajara advances.
^{3} Both clubs were disqualified after failing to agree on match dates.
^{4} Third place was shared.
^{5} After refusing to play their match against the MetroStars in New York, Guadalajara was expelled from the competition by CONMEBOL. They lost their 4 remaining matches with a score of 0–2.
^{6} As São Paulo refused to travel following concerns over the H1N1 flu outbreak in Mexico, Guadalajara withdrew from the tournament. CONMEBOL later secured Guadalajara a place in the round of 16 of the 2010 edition instead.

== Reserves ==
=== Current teams ===
- C.D. Tapatío
- Álamos F.C.

=== Defunct teams ===
- Chivas Tijuana
- Chivas Coras
- Chivas La Piedad
- Chivas Rayadas
- Chivas San Rafael
- C.D. Guadalajara "B"
- C.D. Guadalajara Premier
- C.D. Alianza de Sayula
- Chivas Verde Valle
- C.D. Guadalajara "C"
- C.D. Guadalajara FODF
- Escuela de Fútbol Chivas
