= Adalberto López =

Mexican footballer (1923–1996)

Adalberto López (4 July 1923 – 15 December 1996) was a Mexican professional footballer who most played as a striker. Lopez scored a total of 201 goals in 231 matches in Liga MX.

== Career ==
Born in Cocula, Jalisco, "El Dumbo" López played club football for Club Atlas, Club León, C.D. Oro and C.D. Guadalajara, scoring a record 196 Mexican Primera División goals.

He was elected to the Mexican American Hall of Fame in 1988.

He died in Los Angeles in December 1996.
