= 1948–49 Mexican Primera División season =

6th professional season of the top division of Mexican football

Liga Mayor
- Season: 1948–49
- Champions: León (2nd title)
- Matches: 212
- Goals: 881 (4.16 per match)

The 1948–49 season was the 6th edition of the Mexican professional league known as Liga Mayor. It had 15 participating clubs.

== Clubs ==
Location of the 1948-49 Primera División teams

| Team | City | Stadium |
|---|---|---|
| ADO | Orizaba, Veracruz | Campo Moctezuma |
| América | Mexico City | Ciudad de los Deportes |
| Atlante | Mexico City | Ciudad de los Deportes |
| Atlas | Guadalajara, Jalisco | Parque Oblatos |
| Asturias | Mexico City | Parque Asturias |
| Guadalajara | Guadalajara, Jalisco | Parque Oblatos |
| León | León, Guanajuato | Enrique Fernández Martínez |
| Marte | Mexico City | Ciudad de los Deportes |
| Moctezuma | Orizaba, Veracruz | Campo Moctezuma |
| Oro | Guadalajara, Jalisco | Parque Oblatos |
| Puebla | Puebla, Puebla | Parque El Mirador |
| RC España | Mexico City | Campo España |
| San Sebastián | León, Guanajuato | Enrique Fernández Martínez |
| Tampico | Tampico, Tamaulipas | Tampico |
| Veracruz | Veracruz, Veracruz | Parque Deportivo Veracruzano |

== League standings ==
| Pos | Team | Pld | W | D | L | GF | GA | GD | Pts | Qualification |
|---|---|---|---|---|---|---|---|---|---|---|
| 1 | León | 28 | 18 | 3 | 7 | 62 | 42 | +20 | 39 | Champions |
| 2 | Atlas | 28 | 18 | 2 | 8 | 68 | 39 | +29 | 38 | Runners-up |
| 3 | Guadalajara | 28 | 17 | 4 | 7 | 54 | 37 | +17 | 38 | Third place |
| 4 | Puebla | 28 | 14 | 4 | 10 | 53 | 50 | +3 | 32 | |
| 5 | Asturias | 28 | 12 | 6 | 10 | 58 | 44 | +14 | 30 | |
| 6 | ADO | 28 | 10 | 8 | 10 | 56 | 54 | +2 | 28 | Folded |
| 7 | San Sebastian | 28 | 10 | 8 | 10 | 47 | 53 | −6 | 28 | |
| 8 | Moctezuma | 28 | 11 | 4 | 13 | 58 | 64 | −6 | 26 | |
| 9 | RC España | 28 | 9 | 6 | 13 | 55 | 56 | −1 | 24 | |
| 10 | Veracruz | 28 | 7 | 10 | 11 | 51 | 59 | −8 | 24 | |
| 11 | Marte | 28 | 9 | 6 | 13 | 61 | 73 | −12 | 24 | |
| 12 | Oro | 28 | 8 | 7 | 13 | 45 | 58 | −13 | 23 | |
| 13 | América | 28 | 7 | 8 | 13 | 56 | 69 | −13 | 22 | |
| 14 | Atlante | 28 | 8 | 6 | 14 | 51 | 66 | −15 | 22 | |
| 15 | Tampico | 28 | 7 | 8 | 13 | 34 | 45 | −11 | 22 | |

Source: rsssf.com

== Results ==
| Home \ Away | ADO | AME | AST | ATT | ATL | ESP | GDL | LEO | MAR | MOC | ORO | PUE | SST | TAM | VER |
|---|---|---|---|---|---|---|---|---|---|---|---|---|---|---|---|
| ADO | | 2–3 | 1–1 | 4–1 | 3–2 | 2–1 | 1–2 | 3–0 | 1–2 | 2–2 | 2–2 | 2–1 | 3–3 | 4–1 | 2–2 |
| América | 2–6 | | 2–2 | 5–2 | 1–2 | 1–1 | 1–2 | 2–1 | 5–1 | 2–3 | 3–1 | 2–2 | 2–4 | 2–2 | 2–1 |
| Asturias | 5–1 | 8–2 | | 6–0 | 1–0 | 1–0 | 0–1 | 1–1 | 2–2 | 1–2 | 0–1 | 0–1 | 2–0 | 4–1 | 4–2 |
| Atlante | 3–2 | 2–2 | 2–1 | | 3–2 | 2–3 | 1–2 | 0–2 | 0–3 | 5–2 | 1–2 | 1–2 | 4–1 | 1–1 | 2–2 |
| Atlas | 2–2 | 4–3 | 4–0 | 2–1 | | 3–0 | 1–3 | 8–2 | 2–1 | 4–0 | 1–2 | 4–0 | 2–0 | 1–0 | 5–2 |
| RC España | 1–2 | 0–0 | 0–2 | 3–1 | 1–3 | | 1–1 | 5–1 | 3–1 | 2–2 | 2–2 | 7–4 | 0–3 | 4–3 | 5–2 |
| Guadalajara | 3–1 | 6–2 | 2–2 | 0–0 | 0–3 | 1–2 | | 0–2 | 2–0 | 2–1 | 2–0 | 3–1 | 1–2 | 1–0 | 2–0 |
| León | 4–1 | 2–0 | 3–1 | 4–2 | 2–0 | 3–0 | 1–3 | | 3–0 | 6–3 | 4–1 | 2–2 | 1–1 | 2–1 | 3–1 |
| Marte | 3–1 | 4–3 | 9–3 | 3–3 | 3–0 | 1–6 | 2–2 | 2–0 | | 4–4 | 2–1 | 2–3 | 1–0 | 2–2 | 2–5 |
| Moctezuma | 2–1 | 2–1 | 2–3 | 2–3 | 1–2 | 3–1 | 2–4 | 1–5 | 5–1 | | 5–1 | 0–2 | 1–1 | 3–2 | 1–1 |
| Oro | 4–1 | 1–1 | 1–1 | 0–4 | 2–3 | 2–1 | 1–3 | 1–2 | 5–2 | 1–2 | | 1–3 | 1–3 | 2–0 | 3–3 |
| Puebla | 0–3 | 1–0 | 2–1 | 3–4 | 1–3 | 3–1 | 4–1 | 1–3 | 4–3 | 2–1 | 2–3 | | 6–0 | 1–0 | 1–0 |
| San Sebastián | 1–1 | 1–1 | 0–3 | 4–1 | 3–1 | 2–1 | 0–2 | 1–2 | 3–2 | 2–5 | 2–2 | 2–0 | | 2–2 | 3–1 |
| Tampico | 0–1 | 2–3 | 2–1 | 1–0 | 1–3 | 1–1 | 2–1 | 0–1 | 2–0 | 1–0 | 2–1 | 1–1 | 1–1 | | 2–1 |
| Veracruz | 1–1 | 3–2 | 1–3 | 2–2 | 1–1 | 4–3 | 4–2 | 1–0 | 1–2 | 4–2 | 1–1 | 0–0 | 4–2 | 1–1 | |

Source: rsssf.com
Legend: Blue = home team win; Yellow = draw; Red = away team win.

Champions

2nd title
