= Grupo Omnilife =

Multi-level marketing company

- Industry: Multi-level marketing
- Founded: 1991; 35 years ago
- Headquarters: Guadalajara, Jalisco, Mexico
- Key people: Amaury Vergara (Chairman)
- Products: Nutritional supplements, skin care, soft drinks
- Number of employees: 3,500
- Website: www.omnilife.com

Grupo Omnilife is a Guadalajara-based multi-level marketing company that distributed dietary supplements. The corporation is owned by Amaury Vergara, who also owns the Liga MX football club Guadalajara.

== History ==
Vergara and two American colleagues founded Omnitrion USA in 1989. On September 11, 1991, Omnitrion Mexico was officially founded. Vergara's associates later sold him the rights for Omnitrion Mexico, whose name was changed in 2000 to Omnilife. It began operations with three employees, six distributors and a total investment of $10,000. Its objective was to recruit independent sales consultants to sell nutritional and dietary products to the public.

The company operates in Latin America, the United States, and Spain, and sells more than 70 different nutritional and dietary supplements.

== Marketing strategy ==
Vergara refers to the company's multilevel marketing as "Multidesarrollo", a model which he says is based on marketing methods he used as a distributor with Herbalife. As with other multi-level marketing companies, Omnilife enlists with independent sellers who, in turn, are encouraged to recruit more independent sales representatives under them to create a larger sales and distribution network. Describing the way in which Omnilife functions in Guatemala, anthropologist Diane Nelson describes it as a "direct-sales pyramid scheme (like Herbalife and Amway) in which one accumulates points by selling the product and recruiting more sellers." Sales are made through a company catalog, but products can also be found in stores.

In her discussion of Omnilife in Guatemala, Nelson says that it "is a capital formation complexly linked to prosperity gospel forms, but also to Mayan heritage and post revolutionary dreams of improvement." Nelson is ambivalent about the role of the company in highland communities, but remarks that "it seems to offer both economic promise and ongoing, interethnic, communal therapeutics."

Observing the "Omnilife Basic Course", an event held for the company's distributors in Guatemala City, Diane Nelson notes that "the dynamic is Oprah Winfrey-esque, with a tough love feel and strong engagement from the audience." At a later "Lack and Abundance" workshop, Nelson reports that participants were encouraged to share their stories of suffering and trauma, and were then asked to construct a "dream map" of their material and emotional aspirations.

== Scandal in Chile ==
In August 2014, the TV program En su propia trampa demonstrated that the food products are sold as therapeutical products and miracle cures, and recorded with a hidden camera the presentations. Despite what vendors say, their products do not have any healing power and the permit that has the company only specifies that they are dietary supplements, without therapeutic effects. Another aspect was that, according to the testimonies of sellers, Omnilife charges a high business incorporation fee to the workers, promising big profits, which in practice are never materialized.

== See also ==
- Herbalife Nutrition
