= 1951–52 Mexican Primera División season =

9th professional season of the top-flight football league in Mexico

Primera División de México
- Season: 1951–52
- Champions: León (3rd title)
- Relegated: Veracruz
- Matches: 132
- Goals: 450 (3.41 per match)

Statistics of the Primera División de México for the 1951–52 season.

== Overview ==
Zacatepec was promoted to Primera División.

The season was contested by 12 teams, and León won the championship.

Veracruz was relegated to Segunda División.

=== Teams ===
Location of the 1951-52 Primera División teams

Team	City	Stadium
América	Mexico City	Ciudad de los Deportes
Atlante	Mexico City	Ciudad de los Deportes
Atlas	Guadalajara, Jalisco	Parque Oblatos
Guadalajara	Guadalajara, Jalisco	Parque Oblatos
León	León, Guanajuato	La Martinica
Marte	Mexico City	Ciudad de los Deportes
Necaxa	Mexico City	Ciudad de los Deportes
Oro	Guadalajara, Jalisco	Parque Oblatos
Puebla	Puebla, Puebla	Parque El Mirador
C.D. Tampico	Tampico, Tamaulipas	Tampico
Veracruz	Veracruz, Veracruz	Parque Deportivo Veracruzano
Zacatepec	Zacatepec, Morelos	Campo del Ingenio

== League standings ==
Pos	Team	Pld	W	D	L	GF	GA	GD	Pts	Qualification or relegation
1	León	22	11	9	2	37	20	+17	31	Champions
2	Guadalajara	22	13	4	5	46	24	+22	30	
3	Atlas	22	9	8	5	37	28	+9	26	
4	Oro	22	8	9	5	50	40	+10	25	
5	Atlante	22	8	9	5	36	30	+6	25	
6	Tampico	22	9	5	8	43	37	+6	23	
7	Necaxa	22	8	6	8	33	38	−5	22	
8	Puebla	22	6	7	9	30	47	−17	19	
9	Zacatepec	22	7	4	11	40	41	−1	18	
10	Marte	22	6	6	10	44	49	−5	18	
11	América	22	4	7	11	32	42	−10	15	
12	Veracruz	22	3	6	13	22	54	−32	12	Relegated

Source: RSSSF

1951–52 winners

3rd title

== Results ==
Home \ Away	AME	ATE	ATS	GDL	LEO	MAR	NEC	ORO	PUE	TAM	VER	ZAC
América	—	2–3	0–2	2–3	1–1	0–2	1–4	2–2	1–1	1–1	4–1	1–0
Atlante	2–2	—	2–3	1–2	0–1	5–3	0–0	2–2	3–1	1–0	1–1	2–2
Atlas	1–0	1–1	—	1–2	0–2	2–2	2–2	2–2	3–0	3–1	2–2	4–1
Guadalajara	2–2	1–1	1–1	—	0–1	5–3	0–1	2–1	5–0	4–2	5–0	3–1
León	2–0	2–2	2–0	1–0	—	2–1	2–2	5–0	1–1	2–2	0–1	3–1
Marte	2–1	1–2	2–3	0–2	0–2	—	2–2	1–4	3–3	4–1	5–0	1–1
Necaxa	2–4	0–2	2–0	0–1	2–0	3–1	—	1–2	3–0	3–2	2–2	0–3
Oro	2–1	0–3	2–2	1–1	1–1	5–5	5–1	—	4–0	1–2	0–0	3–0
Puebla	4–1	2–0	1–1	1–0	1–1	1–2	0–0	2–6	—	3–2	2–3	3–3
Tampico	1–1	2–0	1–0	1–3	2–2	4–2	3–0	2–2	3–0	—	4–1	3–0
Veracruz	2–4	0–0	0–2	2–0	1–1	1–2	2–3	2–4	1–2	0–2	—	0–1
Zacatepec	2–1	2–3	0–2	1–4	2–3	0–0	4–0	3–1	1–2	4–2	8–0	—

Source: RSSSF
Legend: Blue = home team win; Yellow = draw; Red = away team win.
