= 1954–55 Mexican Primera División season =

12th professional season of the top-flight football league in Mexico

Primera División de México
- Season: 1954–55
- Champions: Zacatepec (1st title)
- Relegated: Marte
- Matches: 132
- Goals: 382 (2.89 per match)

Statistics of the Primera División de México for the 1954–55 season.

== Overview ==
Irapuato was promoted to Primera División.

The season was contested by 12 teams, and Zacatepec won the championship.

Marte was relegated to Segunda División.

=== Teams ===
Location of the 1954-55 Primera División teams

Team	City	Stadium
América	Mexico City	Ciudad de los Deportes
Atlante	Mexico City	Ciudad de los Deportes
Guadalajara	Guadalajara, Jalisco	Parque Oblatos
Irapuato	Irapuato, Guanajuato	Revolución
León	León, Guanajuato	La Martinica
Marte	Cuernavaca, Morelos	Deportivo Morelos
Necaxa	Mexico City	Ciudad de los Deportes
Oro	Guadalajara, Jalisco	Parque Oblatos
Puebla	Puebla, Puebla	Parque El Mirador
C.D. Tampico	Tampico, Tamaulipas	Tampico
Toluca	Toluca, State of Mexico	Héctor Barraza
Zacatepec	Zacatepec, Morelos	Campo del Ingenio

== League standings ==
Pos	Team	Pld	W	D	L	GF	GA	GD	Pts	Qualification or relegation
1	Zacatepec	22	13	6	3	41	21	+20	32	Champions
2	Guadalajara	22	12	6	4	41	22	+19	30	
3	Necaxa	22	10	5	7	42	30	+12	25	
4	León	22	10	5	7	30	24	+6	25	
5	América	22	9	6	7	28	17	+11	24	
6	Toluca	22	9	5	8	35	30	+5	23	
7	Tampico	22	8	7	7	28	35	−7	23	
8	Oro	22	8	4	10	42	41	+1	20	
9	Puebla	22	7	6	9	29	37	−8	20	
10	Irapuato	22	5	6	11	26	38	−12	16	
11	Atlante	22	4	7	11	23	35	−12	15	
12	Marte	22	2	7	13	17	52	−35	11	Relegated

Source: RSSSF

1954–55 winners

1st title

== Results ==
Home \ Away	AME	ATE	GDL	IRA	LEO	MAR	NEC	ORO	PUE	TAM	TOL	ZAC
América	—	0–0	2–0	0–0	2–0	5–0	1–0	2–1	0–1	0–0	1–1	0–1
Atlante	0–1	—	2–2	3–0	1–0	1–1	1–2	3–1	1–1	1–2	0–1	1–3
Guadalajara	2–0	5–2	—	2–1	2–0	0–1	0–2	2–2	4–0	4–1	3–1	3–3
Irapuato	1–1	0–0	0–1	—	0–2	0–0	3–2	3–2	4–0	3–3	2–1	0–1
León	1–0	3–0	0–1	1–1	—	3–1	1–0	3–0	1–1	3–1	1–1	1–1
Marte	0–2	2–2	0–4	1–0	0–2	—	0–0	1–1	2–2	1–2	0–4	0–1
Necaxa	2–1	0–2	3–2	3–0	1–1	6–1	—	3–2	1–1	2–0	4–1	4–1
Oro	1–5	3–0	0–1	2–3	5–1	3–2	3–3	—	3–1	1–1	3–1	3–0
Puebla	2–3	3–2	0–0	3–0	1–2	1–1	3–1	3–2	—	3–1	2–3	0–3
Tampico	1–1	1–0	0–0	2–0	3–2	5–1	2–1	0–3	1–0	—	0–0	1–1
Toluca	2–1	1–1	1–2	3–1	1–2	4–1	3–1	0–1	2–0	3–2	—	1–1
Zacatepec	1–0	3–0	1–1	5–4	1–0	4–1	1–1	3–0	0–1	6–0	1–0	—

Updated to match(es) played on 23 January 1955. Source: RSSSF
Legend: Blue = home team win; Yellow = draw; Red = away team win.

== Promotion Playoff ==
With the intention of increasing the number of teams in the First Division to 14 clubs, the Mexican Football Federation organized a promotional tournament between the two worst teams of the first level and the second, third and fourth teams of the Second Division. The playoff had five teams: Atlante, Marte, Cuautla, Querétaro and Zamora.

=== Standings ===
Pos	Team	Pld	W	D	L	GF	GA	GD	Pts	Promotion or relegation
1	Atlante	4	3	1	0	13	4	+9	7	Remains in First Division
2	Zamora	4	2	0	2	8	8	0	4	Promoted to First Division
3	Cuautla	4	2	0	2	8	10	−2	4	Promoted to First Division
4	Marte	4	1	1	2	9	9	0	3	Relegated to Second Division
5	Querétaro	4	1	0	3	3	10	−7	2	Remains in Second Division

Source: RSSSF

=== Results ===
Home \ Away	ATE	CUA	MAR	QRO	ZAM
Atlante	—	3–0	2–2	6–1	2–1
Cuautla	–	—	–	1–0	–
Marte	–	3–4	—	3–0	1–3
Querétaro	–	–	–	—	–
Zamora	–	4–3	–	0–2	—

Updated to match(es) played on 8 May 1955. Source: RSSSF
Legend: Blue = home team win; Yellow = draw; Red = away team win.
