= 1960–61 Mexican Primera División season =

18th professional season of the top-flight football league in Mexico

Primera División de México
- Season: 1960–61
- Champions: Guadalajara (4th title)
- Relegated: Celaya
- Matches: 182
- Goals: 510 (2.8 per match)

Statistics of the Primera División de México for the 1960–61 season.

== Overview ==
Monterrey was promoted to Primera División.

The season was contested by 14 teams, and Guadalajara won the championship and becomes first team to win three consecutive championships.

Celaya was relegated to Segunda División.

=== Teams ===
Location of the 1960-61 Primera División teams

Team	City	Stadium
América	Mexico City	Olímpico Universitario
Atlante	Mexico City	Olímpico Universitario
Atlas	Guadalajara, Jalisco	Jalisco
Celaya	Celaya, Guanajuato	Miguel Alemán Valdés
Guadalajara	Guadalajara, Jalisco	Jalisco
Irapuato	Irapuato, Guanajuato	Revolución
León	León, Guanajuato	La Martinica
Monterrey	Monterrey, Nuevo León	Tecnológico
Morelia	Morelia, Michoacán	Campo Morelia
Necaxa	Mexico City	Olímpico Universitario
Oro	Guadalajara, Jalisco	Jalisco
Tampico	Tampico, Tamaulipas	Tampico
Toluca	Toluca, State of Mexico	Luis Gutiérrez Dosal
Zacatepec	Zacatepec, Morelos	Campo del Ingenio

== League standings ==
Pos	Team	Pld	W	D	L	GF	GA	GD	Pts	Qualification or relegation
1	Guadalajara	26	17	5	4	53	29	+24	39	Champions
2	Oro	26	14	4	8	37	24	+13	32	
3	Atlas	26	11	7	8	39	31	+8	29	
4	Necaxa	26	9	11	6	35	34	+1	29	
5	León	26	11	4	11	36	34	+2	26	
6	América	26	8	10	8	29	28	+1	26	
7	Tampico	26	10	6	10	44	43	+1	26	
8	Zacatepec	26	10	6	10	44	51	−7	26	
9	Toluca	26	8	8	10	41	37	+4	24	
10	Atlante	26	8	7	11	33	40	−7	23	
11	Atlético Morelia	26	6	11	9	25	31	−6	23	
12	Irapuato	26	7	7	12	39	47	−8	21	
13	Monterrey	26	7	7	12	31	44	−13	21	
14	Celaya	26	6	7	13	25	38	−13	19	Relegated

1960–61 winners

4th title

== Results ==
Home \ Away	AME	ATE	ATS	CEL	GDL	IRA	LEO	MTY	MOR	NEC	ORO	TAM	TOL	ZAC
América	—	0–1	1–1	1–0	0–1	1–0	0–0	1–2	3–0	0–0	0–1	4–1	2–0	1–1
Atlante	0–1	—	1–4	3–1	0–1	1–1	0–2	2–2	1–1	2–1	2–1	2–0	2–1	2–2
Atlas	1–1	1–0	—	1–0	2–0	2–2	3–2	3–1	1–1	0–2	2–1	3–2	1–1	6–1
Celaya	1–1	0–0	2–3	—	0–3	2–3	1–0	1–1	2–1	0–1	0–3	0–0	1–0	0–1
Guadalajara	1–0	4–3	3–1	2–0	—	3–0	2–1	2–0	4–0	4–1	2–1	2–4	3–2	1–0
Irapuato	2–2	1–2	2–1	0–3	4–1	—	0–2	3–1	0–3	1–1	1–0	2–1	1–2	4–0
León	1–1	0–1	2–1	0–2	2–1	2–2	—	3–1	0–1	5–0	1–0	3–2	0–2	2–0
Monterrey	3–1	1–1	0–1	0–1	1–1	3–2	1–2	—	0–2	1–0	1–0	0–0	3–2	2–1
Morelia	5–0	0–0	1–1	2–2	0–4	2–2	0–1	0–0	—	0–0	0–2	1–1	0–0	0–0
Necaxa	1–1	3–1	2–0	0–0	2–2	2–0	3–1	1–1	1–3	—	1–1	1–1	3–2	0–0
Oro	1–1	3–2	1–0	3–1	1–1	2–1	2–1	3–1	1–0	2–0	—	0–0	2–1	3–1
Tampico	2–1	5–2	1–0	3–1	1–2	1–0	1–0	4–1	1–0	3–4	1–2	—	1–1	6–1
Toluca	1–2	1–0	0–0	1–1	2–2	2–2	5–1	4–2	0–2	2–2	1–0	5–1	—	3–0
Zacatepec	1–3	3–2	1–0	5–3	1–1	5–3	2–2	3–2	4–0	1–3	2–1	5–1	3–0	—

Updated to match(es) played on 15 January 1961. Source: RSSSF
Legend: Blue = home team win; Yellow = draw; Red = away team win.
