= 1961–62 Mexican Primera División season =

19th professional season of the top-flight football league in Mexico

Primera División de México
- Season: 1961–62
- Champions: Guadalajara (5th title)
- Relegated: Zacatepec
- Champions' Cup: Guadalajara
- Matches: 182
- Goals: 568 (3.12 per match)

Statistics of the Primera División de México for the 1961–62 season.

== Overview ==
Nacional was promoted to Primera División.

The season was contested by 14 teams, and Guadalajara won the championship and becomes first team to win four consecutive championships.

Zacatepec was relegated to Segunda División.

=== Teams ===
Location of the 1961-62 Primera División teams

Team	City	Stadium
América	Mexico City	Olímpico Universitario
Atlante	Mexico City	Olímpico Universitario
Atlas	Guadalajara, Jalisco	Jalisco
Guadalajara	Guadalajara, Jalisco	Jalisco
Irapuato	Irapuato, Guanajuato	Revolución
León	León, Guanajuato	La Martinica
Morelia	Morelia, Michoacán	Campo Independiente
Monterrey	Monterrey, Nuevo León	Tecnológico
Nacional	Guadalajara, Jalisco	Jalisco
Necaxa	Mexico City	Olímpico Universitario
Oro	Guadalajara, Jalisco	Jalisco
Tampico	Tampico, Tamaulipas	Tampico
Toluca	Toluca, State of Mexico	Luis Gutiérrez Dosal
Zacatepec	Zacatepec, Morelos	Campo del Ingenio

== League standings ==
Pos	Team	Pld	W	D	L	GF	GA	GD	Pts	Qualification or relegation
1	Guadalajara	26	20	1	5	58	17	+41	41	Champions
2	América	26	14	6	6	51	31	+20	34	
3	Toluca	26	15	4	7	58	37	+21	34	
4	Oro	26	13	5	8	41	32	+9	31	
5	León	26	5	15	6	24	30	−6	25	
6	Irapuato	26	10	5	11	35	47	−12	25	
7	Atlético Morelia	26	8	8	10	32	42	−10	24	
8	Tampico	26	7	9	10	37	41	−4	23	
9	Atlante	26	8	7	11	38	45	−7	23	
10	Nacional	26	7	9	10	30	44	−14	23	
11	Atlas	26	8	6	12	39	44	−5	22	
12	Necaxa	26	7	8	11	47	54	−7	22	
13	Monterrey	26	7	5	14	37	47	−10	19	
14	Zacatepec	26	7	4	15	41	57	−16	18	Relegated

1961–62 winners

5th title

== Results ==
Home \ Away	AME	ATE	ATS	GDL	IRA	LEO	MTY	MOR	NAL	NEC	ORO	TAM	TOL	ZAC
América	—	2–2	1–0	0–1	5–0	1–1	2–0	3–0	3–2	1–1	2–1	4–0	2–0	3–1
Atlante	1–3	—	4–1	2–1	0–3	1–1	4–0	0–1	1–1	3–3	2–0	2–2	0–1	4–2
Atlas	0–1	2–0	—	2–3	3–1	0–0	2–1	3–1	2–0	2–2	1–2	5–0	1–2	2–1
Guadalajara	1–0	2–0	1–0	—	5–0	0–0	5–0	2–1	6–1	4–0	1–2	1–3	2–0	2–0
Irapuato	4–3	0–2	0–0	0–4	—	1–2	1–0	0–0	0–1	3–2	0–2	1–0	3–1	0–0
León	1–1	1–1	1–0	0–3	1–2	—	2–0	0–0	1–1	1–1	0–0	0–0	1–0	0–0
Monterrey	3–0	3–0	4–1	0–2	3–3	1–1	—	0–0	0–0	8–3	1–3	3–2	0–3	3–1
Morelia	2–1	2–4	3–3	0–1	4–0	3–2	2–1	—	3–1	1–0	1–1	1–1	2–2	2–2
Nacional	0–0	1–1	2–2	0–3	1–0	2–2	4–2	2–0	—	2–1	1–0	0–0	2–5	4–1
Necaxa	2–3	3–0	3–3	4–1	1–4	1–2	2–1	4–1	2–0	—	1–1	1–1	2–4	2–0
Oro	3–2	1–0	1–2	1–0	1–3	4–2	0–0	3–0	2–1	0–1	—	1–0	3–3	5–2
Tampico	2–2	4–0	3–0	0–3	2–2	4–1	2–1	0–1	4–0	2–2	2–1	—	2–2	0–3
Toluca	1–2	1–3	5–1	0–1	4–2	1–1	1–0	1–0	2–0	4–2	2–0	2–1	—	5–3
Zacatepec	2–4	4–1	2–1	1–3	0–2	2–0	1–2	5–1	1–1	2–1	2–3	2–0	1–6	—

Updated to match(es) played on 7 January 1962. Source: RSSSF
Legend: Blue = home team win; Yellow = draw; Red = away team win.
