= 1958–59 Mexican Primera División season =

16th professional season of the top-flight football league in Mexico

Primera División de México
- Season: 1958–59
- Champions: Guadalajara (2nd title)
- Relegated: Cuautla
- Campeónato Centroamericano: Guadalajara
- Matches: 182
- Goals: 584 (3.21 per match)

Statistics of the Primera División de México for the 1958–59 season.

== Overview ==
Celaya was promoted to Primera División.

The season was contested by 14 teams, and Guadalajara won the championship.

Cuautla was relegated to Segunda División.

Guadalajara qualified to the 1959 Campeonato Centroamericano.

=== Teams ===
Location of the 1958-59 Primera División teams

Team	City	Stadium
América	Mexico City	Olímpico Universitario
Atlante	Mexico City	Ciudad de los Deportes
Atlas	Guadalajara, Jalisco	Parque Oblatos
Celaya	Celaya, Guanajuato	Miguel Alemán Valdés
Cuautla	Cuautla, Morelos	El Almeal
Guadalajara	Guadalajara, Jalisco	Parque Oblatos
Irapuato	Irapuato, Guanajuato	Revolución
León	León, Guanajuato	La Martinica
Morelia	Morelia, Michoacán	Campo Morelia
Necaxa	Mexico City	Olímpico Universitario
Oro	Guadalajara, Jalisco	Parque Oblatos
Toluca	Toluca, State of Mexico	Héctor Barraza
Zacatepec	Zacatepec, Morelos	Campo del Ingenio
Zamora	Zamora, Michoacán	Moctezuma

== League standings ==
Pos	Team	Pld	W	D	L	GF	GA	GD	Pts	Qualification or relegation
1	Guadalajara	26	16	6	4	52	26	+26	38	Champions
2	León	26	16	4	6	56	31	+25	36	
3	Zacatepec	26	13	6	7	46	41	+5	32	
4	América	26	11	9	6	52	38	+14	31	
5	Atlas	26	12	6	8	52	42	+10	30	
6	Toluca	26	10	8	8	41	37	+4	28	
7	Irapuato	26	10	7	9	32	32	0	27	
8	Oro	26	10	4	12	48	57	−9	24	
9	Zamora	26	6	9	11	44	53	−9	21	
10	Atlético Morelia	26	7	7	12	36	44	−8	21	
11	Necaxa	26	4	12	10	41	49	−8	20	
12	Atlante	26	5	9	12	31	43	−12	19	
13	Celaya	26	4	11	11	30	46	−16	19	
14	Cuautla	26	4	10	12	23	45	−22	18	Relegated

1958–59 winners

2nd title

== Results ==
Home \ Away	AME	ATE	ATS	CEL	CUA	GDL	IRA	LEO	MOR	NEC	ORO	TOL	ZAC	ZAM
América	—	3–1	1–1	4–1	3–0	0–2	3–1	2–0	3–0	4–2	1–3	1–1	2–2	2–2
Atlante	1–1	—	0–1	1–0	1–1	1–2	0–1	2–3	1–1	1–1	2–2	5–2	0–0	2–1
Atlas	0–0	3–4	—	1–1	1–3	2–2	4–0	1–4	2–0	3–3	4–2	3–0	4–5	2–0
Celaya	0–3	0–0	3–3	—	4–1	1–3	2–1	0–0	1–1	1–1	1–2	1–3	0–1	3–2
Cuautla	2–1	2–1	1–2	0–0	—	0–0	2–0	1–1	0–0	1–1	1–2	0–1	1–2	0–2
Guadalajara	3–2	4–0	3–2	2–2	4–0	—	2–0	2–0	3–0	1–0	1–1	2–0	4–1	2–4
Irapuato	4–0	1–0	0–1	0–0	1–1	0–2	—	3–0	4–2	2–1	1–0	2–2	3–0	1–1
León	1–1	2–0	1–0	4–0	5–1	4–0	1–0	—	3–1	4–2	6–1	0–3	3–1	4–1
Morelia	1–1	2–1	1–3	3–1	2–0	2–1	1–2	1–2	—	3–5	3–1	1–1	0–2	4–0
Necaxa	4–3	0–2	1–2	5–2	0–0	0–1	1–1	0–0	1–1	—	2–2	2–2	0–1	1–1
Oro	1–3	4–2	2–5	1–3	3–2	1–0	1–1	3–1	2–1	2–3	—	2–1	3–0	4–5
Toluca	3–5	1–1	1–0	1–0	5–0	1–1	1–1	0–2	1–3	1–1	2–0	—	0–1	5–2
Zacatepec	1–1	3–0	1–2	2–2	2–2	1–4	4–1	2–1	1–0	4–2	3–2	1–2	—	3–0
Zamora	1–2	2–2	3–0	1–1	1–1	1–1	0–1	3–4	2–2	4–2	3–1	0–1	2–2	—

Updated to match(es) played on 11 January 1959. Source: RSSSF
Legend: Blue = home team win; Yellow = draw; Red = away team win.
