= 1959–60 Mexican Primera División season =

17th professional season of the top-flight football league in Mexico

Primera División de México
- Season: 1959–60
- Champions: Guadalajara (3rd title)
- Relegated: Zamora
- Matches: 182
- Goals: 586 (3.22 per match)

Statistics of the Primera División de México for the 1959–60 season.

== Overview ==
Tampico was promoted to Primera División.

It was contested by 14 teams, and Guadalajara won the championship and becomes second team to win consecutive championships.

Zamora was relegated to Segunda División.

=== Teams ===
Location of the 1959-60 Primera División teams

Team	City	Stadium
América	Mexico City	Olímpico Universitario
Atlante	Mexico City	Olímpico Universitario
Atlas	Guadalajara, Jalisco	Parque Oblatos
Celaya	Celaya, Guanajuato	Miguel Alemán Valdés
Guadalajara	Guadalajara, Jalisco	Parque Oblatos
Irapuato	Irapuato, Guanajuato	Revolución
León	León, Guanajuato	La Martinica
Morelia	Morelia, Michoacán	Campo Morelia
Necaxa	Mexico City	Olímpico Universitario
Oro	Guadalajara, Jalisco	Parque Oblatos
Tampico	Tampico, Tamaulipas	Tampico
Toluca	Toluca, State of Mexico	Luis Gutiérrez Dosal
Zacatepec	Zacatepec, Morelos	Campo del Ingenio
Zamora	Zamora, Michoacán	Moctezuma

== League standings ==
Pos	Team	Pld	W	D	L	GF	GA	GD	Pts	Qualification or relegation
1	Guadalajara	26	17	4	5	52	37	+15	38	Champions
2	América	26	14	6	6	38	29	+9	34	
3	Atlas	26	11	9	6	43	33	+10	31	
4	León	26	12	6	8	51	36	+15	30	
5	Toluca	26	12	6	8	47	34	+13	30	
6	Irapuato	26	10	8	8	43	35	+8	28	
7	Tampico	26	8	9	9	52	55	−3	25	
8	Oro	26	9	7	10	44	53	−9	25	
9	Necaxa	26	6	12	8	41	46	−5	24	
10	Zacatepec	26	7	9	10	43	43	0	23	
11	Atlante	26	7	8	11	37	43	−6	22	
12	Celaya	26	7	8	11	31	44	−13	22	
13	Atletico Morelia	26	6	8	12	32	35	−3	20	
14	Zamora	26	4	4	18	32	63	−31	12	Relegated

1959–60 winners

3rd title

== Results ==
Home \ Away	AME	ATE	ATS	CEL	GDL	IRA	LEO	MOR	NEC	ORO	TAM	TOL	ZAC	ZAM
América	—	1–0	1–2	2–2	1–2	0–0	3–0	2–1	2–1	3–2	0–0	0–1	1–1	2–1
Atlante	1–2	—	1–1	3–0	3–0	0–2	0–3	0–0	2–2	2–3	3–2	1–2	2–4	4–1
Atlas	0–2	2–2	—	6–2	1–1	2–0	1–0	2–0	1–1	2–0	2–1	2–1	2–1	5–1
Celaya	2–0	0–0	2–1	—	2–1	1–1	1–0	1–1	0–0	2–2	3–1	1–3	1–0	3–0
Guadalajara	0–2	4–1	0–0	1–1	—	2–1	3–1	1–0	3–2	4–2	4–2	2–1	2–1	2–1
Irapuato	3–0	1–1	1–1	1–0	3–3	—	2–0	2–4	1–0	4–0	3–1	4–0	2–0	5–1
León	3–1	3–0	3–1	4–2	1–0	2–1	—	1–1	2–2	3–0	6–1	1–0	2–2	5–1
Morelia	1–2	1–2	1–0	3–1	0–2	3–0	2–2	—	2–3	1–2	1–1	4–1	0–0	1–1
Necaxa	1–1	0–3	3–3	1–0	1–4	1–1	3–2	2–0	—	1–4	1–1	0–0	4–1	3–1
Oro	0–2	0–1	2–0	3–1	1–2	1–1	1–1	2–1	2–1	—	3–1	3–3	3–3	3–1
Tampico	1–1	2–2	3–1	3–0	4–5	4–0	2–1	2–1	3–3	6–1	—	3–3	2–1	2–4
Toluca	0–1	1–1	0–1	2–0	4–1	5–0	4–2	1–1	3–1	1–1	1–2	—	2–0	2–0
Zacatepec	3–4	4–1	1–1	3–1	0–1	1–0	1–1	2–1	3–3	2–1	1–1	0–3	—	8–2
Zamora	1–2	2–1	1–3	2–2	1–2	2–0	1–2	0–1	1–1	4–0	0–1	2–3	0–0	—

Updated to match(es) played on 27 December 1959. Source: RSSSF
Legend: Blue = home team win; Yellow = draw; Red = away team win.
