= 1982–83 Mexican Segunda División season =

Segunda División de México
- Season: 1982–83
- Champions: Unión de Curtidores (1st Title)
- Promoted: Poza Rica
- Relegated: Tapatío; Cuautla
- Matches played: 388
- Goals scored: 1,042 (2.69 per match)
- Top goalscorer: Miguel Ángel Jiménez (27 goals)

The 1982–83 Segunda División was the 34th season of the Mexican Segunda División. The season started on 21 August 1982 and concluded on 20 May 1983. It was won by Unión de Curtidores.

== Changes ==
- Oaxtepec was promoted to Primera División.
- Tampico was relegated from Primera División.
- Poza Rica was promoted from Tercera División.
- Bachilleres, Irapuato, Lobos de Tlaxcala, Tuberos de Veracruz and Coyotes were relegated from Segunda División.
- Brujas was bought by new owners, was relocated at Querétaro City and renamed as Club Querétaro.
- Estado de México was renamed as Texcoco.
- Tapatío returned to Guadalajara.

As of this season, the competition system was modified. The 20 teams were divided into two zones of 10 teams, which played each other four times during the regular season.

== Teams ==
1982–83 season Teams

| Club | City | Stadium |
|---|---|---|
| Atlético Valladolid | Morelia | Estadio Venustiano Carranza |
| Colima | Colima City | Estadio Colima |
| Córdoba | Córdoba | Estadio Rafael Murillo Vidal |
| Cuautla | Cuautla | Estadio Isidro Gil Tapia |
| Jalisco | Guadalajara | Estadio Jalisco |
| La Piedad | La Piedad | Estadio Juan N. López |
| Nuevo Necaxa | Amecameca | Estadio Francisco Flores |
| Pachuca | Pachuca | Estadio Revolución Mexicana |
| Poza Rica | Poza Rica | Estadio Heriberto Jara Corona |
| Querétaro | Querétaro City | Estadio Municipal de Querétaro |
| Salamanca | Salamanca | Estadio El Molinito |
| SUOO | Cuautitlán | Estadio Los Pinos |
| Tampico | Tampico | Estadio Tamaulipas |
| Tapatío | Guadalajara | Casa Club Guadalajara |
| Tepic | Tepic | Estadio Nicolás Álvarez Ortega |
| Texcoco | Texcoco | Estadio Municipal de Texcoco |
| Tulancingo | Tulancingo | Estadio Primero de Mayo |
| Unión de Curtidores | León | Estadio La Martinica |
| Veracruz | Veracruz City | Estadio Luis "Pirata" Fuente |
| Zamora | Zamora | Estadio Municipal de Zamora |

== Western Zone ==
=== Group 1 ===
| Pos | Team | Pld | W | D | L | GF | GA | GD | Pts | Qualification or relegation |
|---|---|---|---|---|---|---|---|---|---|---|
| 1 | Unión de Curtidores (Q) | 36 | 19 | 9 | 8 | 62 | 43 | +19 | 54 | Qualified to Playoffs |
| 2 | Zamora (Q) | 36 | 15 | 11 | 10 | 58 | 44 | +14 | 50 | Qualified to Playoffs |
| 3 | Tepic | 36 | 13 | 10 | 13 | 49 | 47 | +2 | 42 | |
| 4 | La Piedad | 36 | 10 | 12 | 14 | 44 | 51 | −7 | 37 | |
| 5 | Tapatío | 36 | 8 | 14 | 14 | 42 | 57 | −15 | 33 | Relegated |

Source: RSSSF
(Q) Qualified for the phase indicated

=== Group 2 ===
| Pos | Team | Pld | W | D | L | GF | GA | GD | Pts | Qualification or relegation |
|---|---|---|---|---|---|---|---|---|---|---|
| 1 | Salamanca (Q) | 36 | 16 | 7 | 13 | 62 | 54 | +8 | 47 | Qualified to Playoffs |
| 2 | Jalisco (Q) | 36 | 13 | 11 | 12 | 44 | 42 | +2 | 44 | Qualified to Playoffs |
| 3 | Querétaro | 36 | 11 | 9 | 16 | 45 | 52 | −7 | 37 | |
| 4 | Colima | 36 | 10 | 14 | 12 | 50 | 58 | −8 | 37 | |
| 5 | Atlético Valladolid | 36 | 11 | 11 | 14 | 43 | 51 | −8 | 37 | |

Source: RSSSF
(Q) Qualified for the phase indicated

=== Results ===
First leg

| Home \ Away | ATV | COL | JAL | LPD | QUE | SAL | TAP | TEP | UDC | ZAM |
|---|---|---|---|---|---|---|---|---|---|---|
| Atlético Valladolid | — | 2–0 | 2–3 | 2–2 | 2–0 | 1–0 | 0–0 | 0–0 | 2–2 | 1–0 |
| Colima | 3–2 | — | 1–1 | 2–2 | 2–1 | 1–5 | 3–2 | 3–5 | 1–1 | 1–1 |
| Jalisco | 2–0 | 2–1 | — | 0–0 | 2–0 | 1–5 | 2–2 | 1–3 | 0–2 | 0–1 |
| La Piedad | 1–0 | 1–1 | 1–2 | — | 3–1 | 3–1 | 5–0 | 2–0 | 1–4 | 1–0 |
| Querétaro | 1–2 | 3–0 | 2–1 | 5–1 | — | 3–1 | 1–0 | 3–1 | 0–0 | 2–0 |
| Salamanca | 4–0 | 0–1 | 3–3 | 1–0 | 2–1 | — | 3–1 | 3–0 | 1–0 | 1–1 |
| Tapatío | 1–2 | 0–0 | 2–1 | 0–3 | 1–1 | 1–2 | — | 2–0 | 3–3 | 0–2 |
| Tepic | 0–0 | 1–0 | 0–0 | 1–0 | 2–1 | 1–0 | 2–2 | — | 1–2 | 4–0 |
| Unión de Curtidores | 3–2 | 2–2 | 2–0 | 3–2 | 4–2 | 2–1 | 1–1 | 2–3 | — | 4–1 |
| Zamora | 3–0 | 4–1 | 0–1 | 5–2 | 0–0 | 1–1 | 7–3 | 2–0 | 3–4 | — |

Source: RSSSF
Legend: Blue = home team win; Yellow = draw; Red = away team win.

Second leg

| Home \ Away | ATV | COL | JAL | LPD | QUE | SAL | TAP | TEP | UDC | ZAM |
|---|---|---|---|---|---|---|---|---|---|---|
| Atlético Valladolid | — | 0–0 | 2–0 | 2–0 | 2–3 | 1–4 | 1–0 | 3–2 | 1–0 | 1–2 |
| Colima | 3–2 | — | 2–4 | 1–1 | 1–1 | 2–0 | 0–0 | 4–2 | 0–0 | 3–4 |
| Jalisco | 3–1 | 1–2 | — | 2–0 | 2–0 | 3–0 | 1–1 | 1–0 | 1–1 | 0–0 |
| La Piedad | 0–0 | 3–3 | 0–1 | — | 1–1 | 1–0 | 0–0 | 1–1 | 2–1 | 0–0 |
| Querétaro | 1–0 | 1–0 | 0–0 | 3–1 | — | 0–1 | 1–2 | 0–2 | 1–1 | 3–3 |
| Salamanca | 2–2 | 1–4 | 4–3 | 3–1 | 1–1 | — | 1–1 | 2–5 | 3–1 | 1–0 |
| Tapatío | 2–2 | 1–2 | 0–0 | 2–1 | 1–0 | 3–0 | — | 1–0 | 3–1 | 2–3 |
| Tepic | 2–2 | 1–0 | 0–0 | 0–1 | 3–0 | 3–3 | 1–1 | — | 1–0 | 1–1 |
| Unión de Curtidores | 2–1 | 1–0 | 1–0 | 2–0 | 3–0 | 2–1 | 2–1 | 1–0 | — | 1–0 |
| Zamora | 0–0 | 0–0 | 1–0 | 1–1 | 4–2 | 0–1 | 3–0 | 3–1 | 2–1 | — |

Source: RSSSF
Legend: Blue = home team win; Yellow = draw; Red = away team win.

== Eastern Zone ==
=== Group 3 ===
| Pos | Team | Pld | W | D | L | GF | GA | GD | Pts | Qualification or relegation |
|---|---|---|---|---|---|---|---|---|---|---|
| 1 | Nuevo Necaxa (Q) | 36 | 17 | 10 | 9 | 50 | 40 | +10 | 51 | Qualified to Playoffs |
| 2 | Texcoco (Q) | 36 | 17 | 7 | 12 | 50 | 41 | +9 | 49 | Qualified to Playoffs |
| 3 | Tampico | 36 | 12 | 11 | 13 | 47 | 43 | +4 | 44 | |
| 4 | SUOO | 36 | 8 | 17 | 11 | 49 | 52 | −3 | 36 | |
| 5 | Cuautla | 36 | 10 | 10 | 16 | 43 | 63 | −20 | 33 | Relegated |

Source: RSSSF
(Q) Qualified for the phase indicated

=== Group 4 ===
| Pos | Team | Pld | W | D | L | GF | GA | GD | Pts | Qualification or relegation |
|---|---|---|---|---|---|---|---|---|---|---|
| 1 | Pachuca (Q) | 36 | 16 | 10 | 10 | 52 | 41 | +11 | 49 | Qualified to Playoffs |
| 2 | Veracruz (Q) | 36 | 15 | 11 | 10 | 51 | 42 | +9 | 48 | Qualified to Playoffs |
| 3 | Tulancingo | 36 | 9 | 15 | 12 | 47 | 48 | −1 | 37 | |
| 4 | Córdoba | 36 | 8 | 14 | 14 | 44 | 49 | −5 | 36 | |
| 5 | Poza Rica | 36 | 9 | 13 | 14 | 43 | 57 | −14 | 35 | |

Source: RSSSF
(Q) Qualified for the phase indicated

=== Results ===
First leg

| Home \ Away | COR | CUA | NEC | PAC | PZR | SUO | TAM | TEX | TUL | VER |
|---|---|---|---|---|---|---|---|---|---|---|
| Córdoba | — | 4–0 | 3–1 | 0–0 | 2–2 | 3–3 | 0–0 | 0–1 | 1–1 | 0–2 |
| Cuautla | 1–0 | — | 1–1 | 2–1 | 3–2 | 1–4 | 2–2 | 2–0 | 2–2 | 1–1 |
| Nuevo Necaxa | 1–0 | 2–1 | — | 2–1 | 3–1 | 3–1 | 3–0 | 1–0 | 0–0 | 2–2 |
| Pachuca | 1–1 | 1–0 | 4–0 | — | 3–1 | 2–2 | 2–0 | 1–2 | 2–1 | 2–1 |
| Poza Rica | 1–1 | 1–0 | 1–0 | 2–2 | — | 2–0 | 1–1 | 1–2 | 2–2 | 1–0 |
| SUOO | 0–0 | 1–1 | 0–2 | 1–1 | 5–2 | — | 2–1 | 0–1 | 1–1 | 1–1 |
| Tampico | 1–0 | 3–0 | 1–2 | 0–2 | 3–1 | 1–1 | — | 2–0 | 2–0 | 1–1 |
| Texcoco | 4–2 | 2–0 | 1–1 | 3–0 | 1–0 | 1–2 | 2–0 | — | 3–1 | 1–0 |
| Tulancingo | 0–0 | 2–3 | 1–1 | 1–0 | 2–0 | 0–0 | 3–4 | 1–0 | — | 1–1 |
| Veracruz | 1–1 | 1–1 | 2–1 | 2–0 | 1–0 | 1–1 | 2–1 | 2–1 | 1–1 | — |

Source: RSSSF
Legend: Blue = home team win; Yellow = draw; Red = away team win.

Second leg

| Home \ Away | COR | CUA | NEC | PAC | PZR | SUO | TAM | TEX | TUL | VER |
|---|---|---|---|---|---|---|---|---|---|---|
| Córdoba | — | 1–1 | 3–1 | 2–0 | 1–2 | 0–3 | 3–1 | 1–2 | 1–1 | 1–2 |
| Cuautla | 1–3 | — | 0–0 | 2–3 | 1–1 | 1–0 | 4–0 | 2–0 | 1–0 | 3–2 |
| Nuevo Necaxa | 1–1 | 4–0 | — | 1–0 | 1–1 | 1–0 | 0–0 | 3–0 | 1–0 | 2–1 |
| Pachuca | 1–0 | 4–2 | 1–2 | — | 0–0 | 2–2 | 1–1 | 2–0 | 2–1 | 2–1 |
| Poza Rica | 3–1 | 3–2 | 1–1 | 1–1 | — | 3–1 | 0–0 | 2–2 | 0–1 | 2–0 |
| SUOO | 2–3 | 1–1 | 1–0 | 1–3 | 1–1 | — | 2–1 | 0–1 | 2–2 | 1–1 |
| Tampico | 3–0 | 3–1 | 5–1 | 0–1 | 4–0 | 0–0 | — | 1–1 | 2–0 | 2–1 |
| Texcoco | 2–1 | 4–0 | 0–3 | 1–1 | 3–0 | 3–1 | 1–1 | — | 2–2 | 1–2 |
| Tulancingo | 1–1 | 2–0 | 4–2 | 1–2 | 2–1 | 3–4 | 1–0 | 2–2 | — | 4–0 |
| Veracruz | 2–3 | 2–0 | 2–0 | 2–1 | 4–1 | 2–2 | 2–0 | 1–0 | 2–0 | — |

Source: RSSSF
Legend: Blue = home team win; Yellow = draw; Red = away team win.

== Final stage ==
=== Group 1 ===
| Pos | Team | Pld | W | D | L | GF | GA | GD | Pts | Promotion | UDC | NEC | JAL | VER |
|---|---|---|---|---|---|---|---|---|---|---|---|---|---|---|
| 1 | Unión de Curtidores (Q) | 6 | 2 | 3 | 1 | 11 | 7 | +4 | 9 | Qualified to Final | | 1–1 | 3–1 | 3–0 |
| 2 | Nuevo Necaxa | 6 | 2 | 2 | 2 | 10 | 5 | +5 | 8 | | 1–1 | | 3–0 | 5–0 |
| 3 | Jalisco | 6 | 3 | 0 | 3 | 6 | 9 | −3 | 6 | | 3–2 | 1–0 | | 1–0 |
| 4 | Veracruz | 6 | 2 | 1 | 3 | 4 | 10 | −6 | 6 | | 1–1 | 2–0 | 1–0 | |

Source: RSSSF
Rules for classification: 1st points; 2nd head-to-head points; 3rd head-to-head goal difference; 4th head-to-head goals scored; 5th goal difference; 6th number of goals scored
(Q) Qualified for the phase indicated

=== Group 2 ===
| Pos | Team | Pld | W | D | L | GF | GA | GD | Pts | Promotion | ZAM | PAC | SAL | TEX |
|---|---|---|---|---|---|---|---|---|---|---|---|---|---|---|
| 1 | Zamora (Q) | 6 | 5 | 0 | 1 | 12 | 8 | +4 | 12 | Qualified to Final | | 1–0 | 3–0 | 3–1 |
| 2 | Pachuca | 6 | 4 | 1 | 1 | 11 | 3 | +8 | 12 | | 5–1 | | 2–0 | 2–0 |
| 3 | Salamanca | 6 | 1 | 1 | 4 | 6 | 10 | −4 | 4 | | 1–2 | 1–1 | | 0–1 |
| 4 | Texcoco | 6 | 1 | 0 | 5 | 4 | 12 | −8 | 2 | | 1–2 | 0–1 | 1–4 | |

Source: RSSSF
Rules for classification: 1st points; 2nd head-to-head points; 3rd head-to-head goal difference; 4th head-to-head goals scored; 5th goal difference; 6th number of goals scored
(Q) Qualified for the phase indicated

=== Final ===
May 14, 1983

| Zamora | 1–1 | Unión de Curtidores |
|---|---|---|
| Serratos 57' | Report | Delgado 88' |

Estadio Municipal de Zamora, Zamora
Attendance: 12,000

May 20, 1983

| Unión de Curtidores | 1–0 | Zamora |
|---|---|---|
| García 63' | Report |

Estadio La Martinica, León
Attendance: 17,000
