= 1981–82 Mexican Segunda División season =

Segunda División de México
- Season: 1981–82
- Champions: Oaxtepec (1st Title)
- Promoted: Córdoba
- Relegated: Bachilleres; Irapuato; Lobos de Tlaxcala; Tuberos Veracruz; Coyotes
- Matches played: 578
- Goals scored: 1,638 (2.83 per match)
- Top goalscorer: Rafael Chávez Carretero (24 goals)

The 1981–82 Segunda División was the 33rd season of the Mexican Segunda División. The season started on 15 August 1981 and concluded on 24 July 1982. It was won by Oaxtepec.

It was the last season played by 24 teams, so this time there were five relegations to Segunda División B, a new intermediate category between Segunda and Tercera División.

== Changes ==
- Atlético Morelia was promoted to Primera División.
- Unión de Curtidores was relegated from Primera División.
- Córdoba was promoted from Tercera División.
- Cachorros León was relegated from Segunda División.
- Atletas Industriales was bought by new owners, the team was relocated in Morelia and renamed as Atlético Valladolid.
- Coyotes Neza was relocated from Ciudad Nezahualcóyotl to Tenancingo.
- Tapatío remained at Uruapan after the team was moved in the 1980–81 season final stage.
- Bachilleres was relocated from Ocotlán to Guadalajara.
- Universidad Veracruzana was relocated to Coatzacoalcos and renamed as Brujas de Coatzacoalcos.

=== During the season ===
- Since Week 29, Estado de México was relocated from Toluca to Texcoco.
- Since Week 36, Nuevo Necaxa was relocated from Juan Galindo to Amecameca.

== Teams ==
1981–82 season Teams

| Club | City | Stadium |
|---|---|---|
| Atlético Valladolid | Morelia | Estadio Venustiano Carranza |
| Bachilleres | Guadalajara | Estadio Tecnológico UdeG |
| Brujas de Coatzacoalcos | Coatzacoalcos | Estadio Miguel Hidalgo |
| Colima | Colima City | Estadio Colima |
| Córdoba | Córdoba | Estadio Rafael Murillo Vidal |
| Coyotes Neza | Tenancingo | Estadio Municipal de Tenancingo |
| Cuautla | Cuautla | Estadio Isidro Gil Tapia |
| Estado de México | Toluca; Texcoco | Estadio Toluca 70; Estadio Municipal de Texcoco |
| Irapuato | Irapuato | Estadio Irapuato |
| Jalisco | Guadalajara | Estadio Jalisco |
| La Piedad | La Piedad | Estadio Juan N. López |
| Lobos de Tlaxcala | Tlaxcala City | Estadio Tlahuicole |
| Nuevo Necaxa | Juan Galindo; Amecameca | Estadio 14 de Diciembre; Estadio Francisco Flores |
| Oaxtepec | Oaxtepec | Estadio Olímpico Centro Vacacional IMSS |
| Pachuca | Pachuca | Estadio Revolución Mexicana |
| Salamanca | Salamanca | Estadio El Molinito |
| SUOO | Cuautitlán | Estadio Los Pinos |
| Tapatío | Uruapan | Hermanos López Rayón |
| Tepic | Tepic | Estadio Nicolás Álvarez Ortega |
| Tuberos de Veracruz | Veracruz City | Estadio Luis "Pirata" Fuente |
| Tulancingo | Tulancingo | Estadio Primero de Mayo |
| Unión de Curtidores | León | Estadio La Martinica |
| Veracruz | Veracruz City | Estadio Luis "Pirata" Fuente |
| Zamora | Zamora | Estadio Municipal de Zamora |

== Group stage ==
=== Group 1 ===
| Pos | Team | Pld | W | D | L | GF | GA | GD | Pts | Qualification or relegation |
|---|---|---|---|---|---|---|---|---|---|---|
| 1 | Salamanca (Q) | 46 | 20 | 17 | 9 | 74 | 59 | +15 | 66 | Qualified to Playoffs |
| 2 | Córdoba (Q) | 46 | 20 | 15 | 11 | 65 | 51 | +14 | 65 | Qualified to Playoffs |
| 3 | Jalisco | 46 | 20 | 14 | 12 | 82 | 68 | +14 | 64 | |
| 4 | SUOO | 46 | 16 | 14 | 16 | 67 | 65 | +2 | 54 | |
| 5 | Pachuca | 46 | 16 | 13 | 17 | 58 | 57 | +1 | 53 | |
| 6 | Tuberos de Veracruz (R) | 46 | 11 | 14 | 21 | 47 | 70 | −23 | 41 | Relegated |

Source: RSSSF
(Q) Qualified for the phase indicated; (R) Relegated

=== Group 2 ===
| Pos | Team | Pld | W | D | L | GF | GA | GD | Pts | Qualification or relegation |
|---|---|---|---|---|---|---|---|---|---|---|
| 1 | Oaxtepec (Q) | 46 | 23 | 15 | 8 | 87 | 47 | +40 | 76 | Qualified to Playoffs |
| 2 | Tapatío (Q) | 46 | 16 | 17 | 13 | 65 | 63 | +2 | 58 | Qualified to Playoffs |
| 3 | Zamora | 46 | 14 | 12 | 20 | 59 | 69 | −10 | 49 | |
| 4 | Bachilleres (R) | 46 | 11 | 17 | 18 | 60 | 76 | −16 | 44 | Relegated |
| 5 | Lobos de Tlaxcala (R) | 46 | 11 | 15 | 20 | 47 | 68 | −21 | 43 | Relegated |
| 6 | Coyotes Neza (R) | 46 | 11 | 9 | 26 | 65 | 80 | −15 | 39 | Relegated |

Source: RSSSF
(Q) Qualified for the phase indicated; (R) Relegated

=== Group 3 ===
| Pos | Team | Pld | W | D | L | GF | GA | GD | Pts | Qualification or relegation |
|---|---|---|---|---|---|---|---|---|---|---|
| 1 | Tepic (Q) | 46 | 20 | 12 | 14 | 70 | 58 | +12 | 62 | Qualified to Playoffs |
| 2 | Estado de México (Q) | 46 | 20 | 9 | 17 | 68 | 66 | +2 | 56 | Qualified to Playoffs |
| 3 | Nuevo Necaxa | 46 | 15 | 16 | 15 | 62 | 59 | +3 | 54 | |
| 4 | La Piedad | 46 | 14 | 17 | 15 | 65 | 76 | −11 | 51 | |
| 5 | Brujas de Coatzacoalcos | 46 | 12 | 15 | 19 | 58 | 73 | −15 | 45 | |
| 6 | Atlético Valladolid | 46 | 11 | 15 | 20 | 57 | 79 | −22 | 45 | |

Source: RSSSF
(Q) Qualified for the phase indicated

=== Group 4 ===
| Pos | Team | Pld | W | D | L | GF | GA | GD | Pts | Qualification or relegation |
|---|---|---|---|---|---|---|---|---|---|---|
| 1 | Unión de Curtidores (Q) | 46 | 26 | 12 | 8 | 85 | 38 | +47 | 81 | Qualified to Playoffs |
| 2 | Veracruz (Q) | 46 | 22 | 12 | 12 | 66 | 50 | +16 | 66 | Qualified to Playoffs |
| 3 | Colima | 46 | 15 | 14 | 17 | 69 | 75 | −6 | 55 | |
| 4 | Tulancingo | 46 | 14 | 18 | 14 | 63 | 66 | −3 | 53 | |
| 5 | Cuautla | 46 | 13 | 15 | 18 | 54 | 59 | −5 | 48 | |
| 6 | Irapuato | 46 | 13 | 9 | 24 | 67 | 88 | −21 | 44 | Relegated |

Source: RSSSF
(Q) Qualified for the phase indicated

== Results ==
| Home \ Away | ATV | BAC | BRU | COL | COR | COY | CUA | EDM | IRA | JAL | LPD | LBT | NEC | OAX | PAC | SAL | SUO | TAP | TEP | TUB | TUL | UDC | VER | ZAM |
|---|---|---|---|---|---|---|---|---|---|---|---|---|---|---|---|---|---|---|---|---|---|---|---|---|
| Atlético Valladolid | — | 1–2 | 2–0 | 0–0 | 2–2 | 3–2 | 0–1 | 4–2 | 5–1 | 2–3 | 1–1 | 2–0 | 0–0 | 2–3 | 0–0 | 2–0 | 0–4 | 1–1 | 0–0 | 3–1 | 3–1 | 1–2 | 2–3 | 1–0 |
| Bachilleres | 0–0 | — | 1–1 | 2–2 | 2–2 | 3–2 | 3–1 | 0–0 | 3–1 | 1–0 | 1–2 | 2–1 | 0–1 | 0–0 | 0–2 | 0–1 | 1–0 | 0–0 | 1–1 | 4–1 | 2–2 | 1–1 | 0–1 | 1–1 |
| Brujas | 4–0 | 1–1 | — | 2–2 | 1–1 | 3–1 | 2–1 | 0–1 | 4–1 | 1–1 | 3–2 | 0–0 | 4–0 | 2–1 | 2–1 | 0–1 | 0–1 | 5–0 | 1–0 | 2–2 | 1–2 | 3–0 | 0–1 | 2–2 |
| Colima | 2–0 | 4–2 | 5–0 | — | 3–0 | 2–1 | 1–1 | 1–1 | 3–0 | 2–1 | 2–0 | 2–2 | 2–0 | 3–2 | 5–2 | 2–2 | 3–1 | 0–1 | 1–4 | 3–2 | 3–0 | 0–0 | 0–4 | 2–2 |
| Córdoba | 2–1 | 1–0 | 1–0 | 2–0 | — | 2–0 | 1–0 | 0–1 | 3–1 | 0–0 | 5–2 | 2–0 | 1–1 | 1–0 | 0–1 | 1–1 | 1–1 | 3–2 | 2–1 | 1–2 | 1–1 | 1–0 | 0–0 | 4–2 |
| Coyotes Neza | 3–1 | 2–0 | 3–0 | 2–4 | 1–2 | — | 1–2 | 1–3 | 4–0 | 4–2 | 2–2 | 1–2 | 1–2 | 1–1 | 0–1 | 1–2 | 3–3 | 2–1 | 4–1 | 0–0 | 3–2 | 2–0 | 2–3 | 0–0 |
| Cuautla | 0–1 | 1–1 | 2–2 | 2–0 | 0–0 | 3–1 | — | 2–0 | 3–1 | 2–2 | 2–1 | 3–1 | 1–0 | 0–2 | 1–1 | 0–3 | 2–3 | 1–2 | 0–1 | 0–1 | 2–2 | 0–0 | 0–2 | 2–0 |
| Estado de México | 1–0 | 4–3 | 1–2 | 3–0 | 1–3 | 1–1 | 2–3 | — | 3–2 | 3–3 | 2–1 | 4–1 | 1–0 | 1–2 | 2–1 | 1–3 | 3–4 | 2–0 | 1–0 | 2–1 | 0–0 | 2–1 | 1–0 | 0–3 |
| Irapuato | 5–0 | 2–2 | 1–1 | 4–2 | 1–4 | 2–0 | 3–1 | 1–3 | — | 2–4 | 1–3 | 1–1 | 3–1 | 1–4 | 3–1 | 2–3 | 1–1 | 1–0 | 4–1 | 3–1 | 1–0 | 0–2 | 1–0 | 2–3 |
| Jalisco | 5–1 | 4–1 | 2–1 | 1–0 | 2–2 | 2–1 | 1–0 | 3–2 | 0–0 | — | 3–0 | 1–1 | 3–3 | 1–2 | 3–1 | 2–1 | 1–0 | 1–3 | 1–2 | 3–0 | 3–1 | 1–1 | 2–3 | 3–2 |
| La Piedad | 0–0 | 3–1 | 2–0 | 1–0 | 2–0 | 3–0 | 2–2 | 2–1 | 2–2 | 1–1 | — | 1–0 | 1–1 | 2–2 | 3–2 | 1–1 | 2–2 | 2–1 | 2–1 | 0–0 | 2–1 | 1–2 | 2–0 | 2–2 |
| Lobos Tlaxcala | 1–1 | 0–1 | 1–1 | 4–1 | 0–0 | 4–0 | 0–0 | 2–0 | 1–0 | 0–1 | 2–2 | — | 2–1 | 2–2 | 0–1 | 0–0 | 0–3 | 2–2 | 2–1 | 2–0 | 0–2 | 1–0 | 2–0 | 0–3 |
| Nuevo Necaxa | 2–1 | 3–2 | 2–0 | 1–1 | 4–1 | 1–0 | 2–3 | 0–2 | 0–2 | 4–0 | 2–2 | 2–1 | — | 2–1 | 3–1 | 1–1 | 0–0 | 3–1 | 1–1 | 1–1 | 5–2 | 0–0 | 3–1 | 1–0 |
| Oaxtepec | 3–1 | 2–0 | 9–0 | 4–2 | 3–2 | 1–0 | 2–2 | 1–1 | 1–0 | 0–0 | 2–0 | 1–0 | 1–1 | — | 3–0 | 1–0 | 2–0 | 0–0 | 3–3 | 2–0 | 3–1 | 2–2 | 3–0 | 2–0 |
| Pachuca | 1–1 | 2–0 | 4–0 | 3–0 | 0–2 | 1–0 | 2–2 | 1–1 | 4–3 | 1–1 | 3–1 | 1–1 | 1–0 | 1–3 | — | 1–0 | 2–3 | 0–2 | 1–1 | 4–0 | 0–0 | 0–0 | 2–0 | 3–0 |
| Salamanca | 3–1 | 4–2 | 2–2 | 1–1 | 1–1 | 2–0 | 1–1 | 2–0 | 3–2 | 0–0 | 3–1 | 2–0 | 3–2 | 3–2 | 2–1 | — | 2–1 | 0–0 | 4–1 | 2–1 | 1–1 | 0–1 | 0–2 | 2–1 |
| SUOO | 1–0 | 2–4 | 2–0 | 2–0 | 0–1 | 2–3 | 1–0 | 1–1 | 0–0 | 0–3 | 0–0 | 7–1 | 3–3 | 1–0 | 2–0 | 1–1 | — | 2–2 | 2–0 | 1–1 | 1–2 | 1–3 | 0–0 | 2–1 |
| Tapatío | 3–3 | 2–2 | 2–1 | 2–0 | 1–1 | 1–3 | 1–0 | 2–1 | 2–2 | 3–1 | 6–1 | 2–1 | 2–0 | 0–0 | 0–0 | 1–1 | 0–0 | — | 0–2 | 1–0 | 2–2 | 0–2 | 2–0 | 4–1 |
| Tepic | 4–0 | 3–0 | 1–1 | 1–0 | 1–0 | 2–0 | 2–1 | 3–1 | 1–0 | 1–1 | 1–1 | 3–0 | 1–0 | 1–6 | 1–1 | 5–2 | 4–0 | 1–3 | — | 1–0 | 1–1 | 4–1 | 0–0 | 1–0 |
| Tuberos | 1–1 | 1–1 | 1–0 | 5–1 | 0–2 | 2–2 | 0–2 | 2–0 | 0–1 | 0–3 | 2–2 | 1–1 | 2–2 | 2–0 | 2–0 | 2–4 | 1–0 | 1–0 | 2–1 | — | 1–1 | 0–2 | 0–0 | 0–3 |
| Tulancingo | 2–2 | 2–4 | 0–0 | 0–0 | 2–1 | 2–1 | 1–1 | 2–0 | 1–0 | 3–0 | 2–1 | 2–4 | 0–0 | 2–0 | 0–1 | 2–2 | 3–1 | 2–2 | 1–1 | 0–2 | — | 3–0 | 4–2 | 1–0 |
| Unión de Curtidores | 2–2 | 6–2 | 3–0 | 4–1 | 3–0 | 2–1 | 1–0 | 1–1 | 4–1 | 6–2 | 4–0 | 2–0 | 0–0 | 0–0 | 1–0 | 4–1 | 4–0 | 5–0 | 3–2 | 1–0 | 1–1 | — | 1–0 | 5–0 |
| Veracruz | 4–1 | 1–1 | 3–2 | 1–1 | 2–2 | 1–1 | 1–1 | 0–1 | 1–1 | 3–2 | 4–1 | 0–0 | 2–1 | 1–1 | 2–1 | 3–1 | 2–1 | 3–1 | 3–1 | 3–0 | 2–0 | 1–0 | — | 1–0 |
| Zamora | 0–3 | 2–0 | 1–1 | 0–0 | 2–1 | 2–1 | 2–0 | 1–4 | 2–1 | 0–3 | 1–0 | 4–1 | 2–0 | 2–2 | 1–1 | 0–0 | 2–4 | 2–2 | 0–1 | 2–2 | 3–0 | 0–1 | 2–0 | — |

Source: RSSSF
Legend: Blue = home team win; Yellow = draw; Red = away team win.

== Final stage ==
=== Group 1 ===
| Pos | Team | Pld | W | D | L | GF | GA | GD | Pts | Promotion | TEP | VER | TAP | SAL |
|---|---|---|---|---|---|---|---|---|---|---|---|---|---|---|
| 1 | Tepic (Q) | 6 | 4 | 0 | 2 | 10 | 7 | +3 | 9 | Qualified to Final | | 1–0 | 2–0 | 1–0 |
| 2 | Veracruz | 6 | 3 | 0 | 3 | 13 | 12 | +1 | 8 | | 4–3 | | 3–1 | 5–2 |
| 3 | Tapatío | 6 | 3 | 1 | 2 | 8 | 9 | −1 | 7 | | 2–1 | 2–1 | | 1–1 |
| 4 | Salamanca | 6 | 1 | 1 | 4 | 8 | 11 | −3 | 4 | | 1–2 | 3–0 | 1–2 | |

Source: RSSSF
Rules for classification: 1st points; 2nd head-to-head points; 3rd head-to-head goal difference; 4th head-to-head goals scored; 5th goal difference; 6th number of goals scored
(Q) Qualified for the phase indicated

=== Group 2 ===
| Pos | Team | Pld | W | D | L | GF | GA | GD | Pts | Promotion | OAX | UDC | COR | EDM |
|---|---|---|---|---|---|---|---|---|---|---|---|---|---|---|
| 1 | Oaxtepec (Q) | 6 | 3 | 3 | 0 | 10 | 5 | +5 | 11 | Qualified to Final | | 3–1 | 1–1 | 2–1 |
| 2 | Unión de Curtidores | 6 | 2 | 2 | 2 | 11 | 9 | +2 | 8 | | 1–1 | | 1–2 | 5–2 |
| 3 | Córdoba | 6 | 2 | 3 | 1 | 7 | 6 | +1 | 8 | | 0–0 | 1–1 | | 2–0 |
| 4 | Estado de México | 6 | 1 | 0 | 5 | 7 | 15 | −8 | 3 | | 1–3 | 0–2 | 3–1 | |

Source: RSSSF
Rules for classification: 1st points; 2nd head-to-head points; 3rd head-to-head goal difference; 4th head-to-head goals scored; 5th goal difference; 6th number of goals scored
(Q) Qualified for the phase indicated

=== Final ===
July 16, 1982

| Tepic | 0–1 | Oaxtepec |
|---|---|---|
| | Report | Arnoldo Correa 88' |

Estadio Nicolás Álvarez Ortega, Tepic

July 24, 1982

| Oaxtepec | 2–1 | Tepic |
|---|---|---|
| Jorge Garrido 24'; Ignacio Negrete 64' | Report | Marcelino Bernal 87' |

Estadio Olímpico del Centro Vacacional IMSS, Oaxtepec
