= 1983–84 Mexican Segunda División season =

Segunda División de México
- Season: 1983–84
- Champions: Zacatepec (5th Title)
- Promoted: UAT; Tecomán
- Relegated: SUOO; La Piedad; UABJO
- Matches played: 397
- Goals scored: 1,016 (2.56 per match)
- Top goalscorer: Miguel Ángel Jiménez (25 goals)

The 1983–84 Segunda División was the 35th season of the Mexican Segunda División. The season started on 3 September 1983 and concluded on 6 July 1984. It was won by Zacatepec.

== Changes ==
- Unión de Curtidores was promoted to Primera División.
- Zacatepec was relegated from Primera División.
- UAT was promoted from Segunda División B.
- Tecomán was promoted from Tercera División.
- Tapatío and Cuautla were relegated from Segunda División.
- Querétaro was bought by new owners and renamed as Cobras.
- Tampico was sold, relocated to Oaxaca City and renamed as UABJO.
- Atlético Valladolid was sold to C.D. Irapuato.

As of this season, the competition system was modified. The away team victories awarded 3 points instead of two.

== Teams ==
1983–84 season Teams

Club	City	Stadium
Cobras	Querétaro City	Estadio Municipal de Querétaro
Colima	Colima City	Estadio Colima
Córdoba	Córdoba	Estadio Rafael Murillo Vidal
Irapuato	Irapuato	Estadio Irapuato
Jalisco	Guadalajara	Estadio Jalisco
La Piedad	La Piedad	Estadio Juan N. López
Nuevo Necaxa	Amecameca	Estadio Francisco Flores
Pachuca	Pachuca	Estadio Revolución Mexicana
Poza Rica	Poza Rica	Estadio Heriberto Jara Corona
Salamanca	Salamanca	Estadio El Molinito
SUOO	Cuautitlán	Estadio Los Pinos
Tecomán	Tecomán	Estadio IAETAC
Tepic	Tepic	Estadio Nicolás Álvarez Ortega
Texcoco	Texcoco	Estadio Municipal de Texcoco
Tulancingo	Tulancingo	Estadio Primero de Mayo
UABJ Oaxaca	Oaxaca City	Estadio Gral. Manuel Cabrera Carrasquedo
UAT	Ciudad Victoria	Estadio Marte R. Gómez
Veracruz	Veracruz City	Estadio Luis "Pirata" Fuente
Zacatepec	Zacatepec	Estadio Agustín "Coruco" Díaz
Zamora	Zamora	Estadio Municipal de Zamora

== Western Zone ==
=== Group 1 ===
Pos	Team	Pld	W	D	L	GF	GA	GD	Pts	Qualification or relegation
1	Jalisco (Q)	36	19	7	10	58	35	+23	60	Qualified to Playoffs
2	Irapuato (Q)	36	16	12	8	61	40	+21	58	Qualified to Playoffs
3	Zamora	36	11	17	8	47	49	−2	43	
4	Tecomán	36	12	11	13	47	55	−8	42	
5	La Piedad	36	9	9	18	47	66	−19	32	Relegation Group

Source: RSSSF
(Q) Qualified for the phase indicated

=== Group 2 ===
Pos	Team	Pld	W	D	L	GF	GA	GD	Pts	Qualification or relegation
1	Cobras (Q)	36	13	13	10	51	41	+10	50	Qualified to Playoffs
2	Colima (Q)	36	13	13	10	54	43	+11	49	Qualified to Playoffs
3	Salamanca	36	12	13	11	54	53	+1	46	
4	Tepic	36	9	16	11	40	48	−8	40	
5	SUOO (R)	36	7	7	22	45	74	−29	25	Relegated

Source: RSSSF
(Q) Qualified for the phase indicated; (R) Relegated

=== Results ===
First leg

Home \ Away	COB	COL	IRA	JAL	LPD	SAL	SUO	TEC	TEP	ZAM
Cobras	—	1–1	0–3	1–0	1–2	3–1	4–0	3–0	1–1	3–1
Colima	2–2	—	1–1	0–1	1–0	3–3	4–3	1–1	3–0	1–1
Irapuato	2–2	2–0	—	2–0	3–1	2–0	1–1	2–0	1–1	3–1
Jalisco	2–1	1–1	2–2	—	3–0	2–0	6–0	1–2	5–0	5–0
La Piedad	2–1	0–0	2–2	1–2	—	2–2	4–3	1–3	0–1	2–2
Salamanca	1–1	1–1	1–0	3–1	1–2	—	2–2	1–0	4–4	2–1
SUOO	1–0	1–2	1–4	1–2	2–5	1–2	—	2–3	1–1	0–0
Tecomán	2–1	1–4	1–1	2–1	2–1	0–0	0–1	—	0–0	2–2
Tepic	1–0	0–1	2–2	2–3	0–1	3–1	1–0	2–2	—	0–0
Zamora	2–2	0–0	0–3	1–0	4–1	3–2	3–2	2–2	2–0	—

Source: RSSSF
Legend: Blue = home team win; Yellow = draw; Red = away team win.

Second leg

Home \ Away	COB	COL	IRA	JAL	LPD	SAL	SUO	TEC	TEP	ZAM
Cobras	—	0–0	1–1	1–0	3–1	3–1	2–2	4–2	3–0	0–0
Colima	1–1	—	6–3	1–2	1–0	4–1	2–3	0–2	3–1	2–2
Irapuato	2–0	2–0	—	2–0	2–2	1–2	1–0	2–0	1–1	2–1
Jalisco	1–0	0–2	3–1	—	2–1	1–0	2–2	2–0	2–2	1–1
La Piedad	0–1	0–3	2–1	1–2	—	1–0	5–3	2–3	0–0	1–1
Salamanca	1–1	2–0	0–0	0–0	3–1	—	3–0	1–1	2–2	3–0
SUOO	0–1	1–0	0–1	0–1	2–2	3–4	—	4–1	1–0	0–1
Tecomán	0–1	1–3	2–1	2–1	3–0	2–0	0–1	—	1–3	2–2
Tepic	1–1	2–0	2–1	0–0	3–1	0–2	2–0	1–1	—	0–0
Zamora	4–1	1–0	2–1	0–1	0–0	2–2	2–1	1–1	2–1	—

Source: RSSSF
Legend: Blue = home team win; Yellow = draw; Red = away team win.

== Eastern Zone ==
=== Group 3 ===
Pos	Team	Pld	W	D	L	GF	GA	GD	Pts	Qualification or relegation
1	Pachuca (Q)	36	19	13	4	58	33	+25	65	Qualified to Playoffs
2	Zacatepec (Q)	36	15	12	9	55	27	+28	56	Qualified to Playoffs
3	Veracruz	36	12	12	12	50	48	+2	44	
4	UABJ Oaxaca	36	9	11	16	29	56	−27	37	Relegation Group
5	Poza Rica	36	8	14	14	30	44	−14	35	Relegation Group

Source: RSSSF
(Q) Qualified for the phase indicated

=== Group 4 ===
Pos	Team	Pld	W	D	L	GF	GA	GD	Pts	Qualification or relegation
1	UAT (Q)	36	12	13	11	43	39	+4	46	Qualified to Playoffs
2	Tulancingo (Q)	36	12	11	13	39	41	−2	43	Qualified to Playoffs
3	Nuevo Necaxa	36	11	13	12	38	40	−2	42	
4	Texcoco	36	11	14	11	39	46	−7	42	
5	Córdoba	36	8	13	15	35	42	−7	32	Relegation Group

Source: RSSSF
(Q) Qualified for the phase indicated

=== Results ===
First leg

Home \ Away	COR	NEC	PAC	PZR	TEX	TUL	UAB	UAT	VER	ZAC
Córdoba	—	1–0	0–0	1–2	1–1	2–2	1–2	1–1	1–0	2–0
Nuevo Necaxa	1–0	—	1–1	4–1	0–2	4–0	3–0	0–0	1–1	1–0
Pachuca	3–1	4–3	—	2–0	1–1	1–1	3–0	2–1	2–0	3–1
Poza Rica	2–1	0–0	0–0	—	0–0	1–1	1–1	1–0	0–0	3–1
Texcoco	2–1	1–1	0–3	0–0	—	1–2	2–2	3–0	1–1	0–0
Tulancingo	0–0	1–1	0–1	2–0	3–4	—	1–0	2–0	1–2	1–0
UABJ Oaxaca	2–2	0–1	0–0	2–0	0–1	3–1	—	1–0	0–0	0–0
UAT	1–0	2–0	2–2	3–1	0–1	3–1	1–1	—	0–1	1–0
Veracruz	1–0	3–0	5–1	0–0	2–2	1–1	2–0	1–1	—	4–3
Zacatepec	3–1	0–0	3–0	2–0	3–0	3–1	7–1	4–1	1–1	—

Source: RSSSF
Legend: Blue = home team win; Yellow = draw; Red = away team win.

Second leg

Home \ Away	COR	NEC	PAC	PZR	TEX	TUL	UAB	UAT	VER	ZAC
Córdoba	—	2–1	0–1	2–2	5–0	1–0	0–0	0–1	1–1	1–0
Nuevo Necaxa	1–1	—	0–0	1–0	0–0	1–1	0–2	2–2	4–3	1–1
Pachuca	1–1	0–1	—	3–2	2–2	1–0	3–0	2–1	4–1	0–0
Poza Rica	2–0	1–3	2–3	—	0–0	1–0	2–0	1–1	0–2	0–0
Texcoco	1–1	0–1	0–2	1–0	—	0–1	6–1	2–1	2–1	1–0
Tulancingo	3–0	1–0	0–0	1–1	2–0	—	0–0	4–1	2–1	0–0
UABJ Oaxaca	0–2	2–0	0–3	2–0	2–0	0–1	—	1–1	2–0	1–1
UAT	0–0	3–0	1–0	1–1	3–1	2–0	4–1	—	3–1	0–0
Veracruz	3–2	2–0	2–3	0–2	1–1	3–2	3–0	1–1	—	0–1
Zacatepec	2–0	2–1	1–1	4–1	3–0	2–0	4–0	0–0	3–0	—

Source: RSSSF
Legend: Blue = home team win; Yellow = draw; Red = away team win.

== Championship stage ==
=== Group 1 ===
Pos	Team	Pld	W	D	L	GF	GA	GD	Pts	Promotion	JAL	PAC	COL	TUL
1	Jalisco (Q)	6	3	2	1	7	3	+4	10	Qualified to Final		1–1	1–0	3–0
2	Pachuca	6	2	2	2	8	7	+1	8		1–1		2–0	2–0
3	Colima	6	3	0	3	9	9	0	8		1–0	4–2		4–2
4	Tulancingo	6	2	0	4	5	10	−5	5		0–1	1–0	2–0	

Source: RSSSF
Rules for classification: 1st points; 2nd head-to-head points; 3rd head-to-head goal difference; 4th head-to-head goals scored; 5th goal difference; 6th number of goals scored
(Q) Qualified for the phase indicated

=== Group 2 ===
Pos	Team	Pld	W	D	L	GF	GA	GD	Pts	Promotion	ZAC	IRA	UAT	COB
1	Zacatepec (Q)	6	4	0	2	9	4	+5	11	Qualified to Final		3–0	3–1	1–0
2	Irapuato	6	3	2	1	7	4	+3	10		1–0		3–0	3–1
3	UAT	6	2	2	2	4	7	−3	6		1–0	0–0		1–0
4	Cobras	6	0	2	4	3	8	−5	2		1–2	0–0	1–1	

Source: RSSSF
Rules for classification: 1st points; 2nd head-to-head points; 3rd head-to-head goal difference; 4th head-to-head goals scored; 5th goal difference; 6th number of goals scored
(Q) Qualified for the phase indicated

=== Final ===
July 1, 1984

Zacatepec	2–0	Jalisco
Miguel Ramírez 19', 42'	Report

Estadio Agustín "Coruco" Díaz, Zacatepec

July 6, 1984

Jalisco	1–1	Zacatepec
Ramos 88'	Report	Arturo Magaña 8'

Estadio Jalisco, Guadalajara

== Relegation Group ==
Pos	Team	Pld	W	D	L	GF	GA	GD	Pts	Promotion	PZR	COR	LPD	UAB
1	Poza Rica	6	4	1	1	19	10	+9	11			2–1	3–2	7–1
2	Córdoba	6	3	2	1	11	6	+5	10		1–0		1–1	4–1
3	La Piedad (R)	5	1	2	2	10	11	−1	5	Relegated	3–5	2–2		2–0
4	UABJ Oaxaca (R)	5	0	1	4	4	17	−13	1	Relegated	2–2	0–2		

Source: RSSSF
Rules for classification: 1st points; 2nd head-to-head points; 3rd head-to-head goal difference; 4th head-to-head goals scored; 5th goal difference; 6th number of goals scored
(R) Relegated
