= 1980–81 Mexican Segunda División season =

Segunda División de México
- Season: 1980–81
- Champions: Atlético Morelia (1st Title)
- Promoted: Oaxtepec
- Relegated: Cachorros León
- Matches played: 578
- Goals scored: 1,588 (2.75 per match)
- Top goalscorer: Ricardo Márquez (28 goals)

The 1980–81 Segunda División was the 32nd season of the Mexican Segunda División. The season started on 19 July 1980 and concluded on 26 July 1981. It was won by Atlético Morelia.

== Changes ==
- Atletas Campesinos was promoted to Primera División.
- Jalisco was relegated from Primera División.
- Oaxtepec was promoted from Tercera División.
- UV Coatzacoalcos was relegated from Segunda División.

== Teams ==
1980–81 season Teams

| Club | City | Stadium |
|---|---|---|
| Atletas Industriales | Querétaro City | Estadio Municipal de Querétaro |
| Atlético Morelia | Morelia | Estadio Venustiano Carranza |
| Bachilleres | Guadalajara | Estadio Tecnológico U. de G. |
| Cachorros León | León | Estadio Nou Camp |
| Colima | Colima City | Estadio Colima |
| Coyotes Neza | Ciudad Nezahualcóyotl | Estadio Metropolitano |
| Cuautla | Cuautla | Estadio Isidro Gil Tapia |
| Estado de México | Toluca | Estadio Toluca 70 |
| Irapuato | Irapuato | Estadio Irapuato |
| Jalisco | Guadalajara | Estadio Jalisco |
| La Piedad | La Piedad | Estadio Juan N. López |
| Lobos de Tlaxcala | Tlaxcala City | Estadio Tlahuicole |
| Nuevo Necaxa | Juan Galindo | Estadio 14 de Diciembre |
| Oaxtepec | Oaxtepec | Estadio Olímpico Centro Vacacional IMSS |
| Pachuca | Pachuca | Estadio Revolución Mexicana |
| Salamanca | Salamanca | Estadio El Molinito |
| SUOO | Cuautitlán | Estadio Los Pinos |
| Tapatío | Guadalajara | Casa Club Guadalajara |
| Tepic | Tepic | Estadio Nicolás Álvarez Ortega |
| Tuberos de Veracruz | Veracruz City | Estadio Luis "Pirata" Fuente |
| Tulancingo | Tulancingo | Estadio Primero de Mayo |
| UV | Xalapa | Estadio Antonio M. Quirasco |
| Veracruz | Veracruz City | Estadio Luis "Pirata" Fuente |
| Zamora | Zamora | Estadio 20 de Noviembre |

== Group stage ==
=== Group 1 ===
| Pos | Team | Pld | W | D | L | GF | GA | GD | Pts | Qualification or relegation |
|---|---|---|---|---|---|---|---|---|---|---|
| 1 | Estado de México (Q) | 46 | 23 | 11 | 12 | 72 | 47 | +25 | 71 | Qualified to Playoffs |
| 2 | Oaxtepec (Q) | 46 | 16 | 15 | 15 | 69 | 54 | +15 | 58 | Qualified to Playoffs |
| 3 | Nuevo Necaxa | 46 | 15 | 17 | 14 | 80 | 72 | +8 | 54 | |
| 4 | Tulancingo | 46 | 15 | 18 | 13 | 68 | 67 | +1 | 54 | |
| 5 | Tuberos de Veracruz | 46 | 17 | 9 | 20 | 52 | 64 | −12 | 48 | |
| 6 | La Piedad | 46 | 12 | 16 | 18 | 58 | 67 | −9 | 46 | |

Source: RSSSF
(Q) Qualified for the phase indicated

=== Group 2 ===
| Pos | Team | Pld | W | D | L | GF | GA | GD | Pts | Qualification or relegation |
|---|---|---|---|---|---|---|---|---|---|---|
| 1 | Coyotes Neza (Q) | 46 | 22 | 16 | 8 | 82 | 45 | +37 | 74 | Qualified to Playoffs |
| 2 | Veracruz (Q) | 46 | 23 | 11 | 12 | 77 | 55 | +22 | 69 | Qualified to Playoffs |
| 3 | Salamanca | 46 | 19 | 11 | 16 | 82 | 69 | +13 | 60 | |
| 4 | Zamora | 46 | 11 | 20 | 15 | 44 | 44 | 0 | 50 | |
| 5 | Atletas Industriales | 46 | 10 | 12 | 24 | 42 | 75 | −33 | 36 | |
| 6 | Lobos de Tlaxcala | 46 | 10 | 13 | 23 | 46 | 80 | −34 | 35 | |

Source: RSSSF
(Q) Qualified for the phase indicated

=== Group 3 ===
| Pos | Team | Pld | W | D | L | GF | GA | GD | Pts | Qualification or relegation |
|---|---|---|---|---|---|---|---|---|---|---|
| 1 | Jalisco (Q) | 46 | 22 | 14 | 10 | 85 | 54 | +31 | 76 | Qualified to Playoffs |
| 2 | Atlético Morelia (Q) | 46 | 21 | 13 | 12 | 79 | 62 | +17 | 67 | Qualified to Playoffs |
| 3 | Colima | 46 | 16 | 13 | 17 | 72 | 77 | −5 | 53 | |
| 4 | Pachuca | 46 | 14 | 13 | 19 | 55 | 67 | −12 | 48 | |
| 5 | Bachilleres | 46 | 16 | 9 | 21 | 58 | 72 | −14 | 48 | |
| 6 | Irapuato | 46 | 12 | 16 | 18 | 55 | 69 | −14 | 45 | |

Source: RSSSF
(Q) Qualified for the phase indicated

=== Group 4 ===
| Pos | Team | Pld | W | D | L | GF | GA | GD | Pts | Qualification or relegation |
|---|---|---|---|---|---|---|---|---|---|---|
| 1 | Tepic (Q) | 46 | 23 | 12 | 11 | 63 | 57 | +6 | 66 | Qualified to Playoffs |
| 2 | Tapatío (Q) | 46 | 18 | 15 | 13 | 72 | 58 | +14 | 62 | Qualified to Playoffs |
| 3 | SUOO | 46 | 18 | 13 | 15 | 61 | 54 | +7 | 61 | |
| 4 | Universidad Veracruzana | 46 | 15 | 15 | 16 | 58 | 54 | +4 | 51 | |
| 5 | Cuautla | 46 | 11 | 18 | 17 | 43 | 61 | −18 | 46 | |
| 6 | Cachorros León | 46 | 6 | 14 | 26 | 47 | 96 | −49 | 28 | Relegated |

Source: RSSSF
(Q) Qualified for the phase indicated

== Results ==
| Home \ Away | ATI | ATM | BAC | CAL | COL | COY | CUA | EDM | IRA | JAL | LPD | LBT | NEC | OAX | PAC | SAL | SUO | TAP | TEP | TUB | TUL | UV | VER | ZAM |
|---|---|---|---|---|---|---|---|---|---|---|---|---|---|---|---|---|---|---|---|---|---|---|---|---|
| Atletas Industriales | — | 0–2 | 1–2 | 2–1 | 0–4 | 2–1 | 2–3 | 1–1 | 3–2 | 0–3 | 0–3 | 2–2 | 2–2 | 0–1 | 0–2 | 1–2 | 2–1 | 3–1 | 1–1 | 0–1 | 1–1 | 2–0 | 0–1 | 0–0 |
| Atlético Morelia | 2–0 | — | 2–2 | 3–1 | 2–2 | 1–1 | 0–2 | 1–1 | 4–0 | 3–1 | 1–1 | 3–0 | 2–1 | 2–1 | 3–2 | 1–1 | 2–0 | 1–3 | 5–0 | 3–1 | 3–2 | 3–1 | 0–2 | 1–0 |
| Bachilleres | 3–1 | 0–0 | — | 3–1 | 1–4 | 0–3 | 1–0 | 1–3 | 2–1 | 2–0 | 0–2 | 1–0 | 2–2 | 1–2 | 0–1 | 1–3 | 0–0 | 0–0 | 1–1 | 1–0 | 1–2 | 2–1 | 2–3 | 1–1 |
| Cachorros León | 2–1 | 2–4 | 0–2 | — | 0–0 | 1–1 | 2–2 | 0–2 | 0–0 | 2–0 | 1–1 | 1–0 | 3–3 | 0–3 | 0–0 | 3–3 | 1–1 | 1–4 | 1–2 | 0–1 | 1–2 | 2–2 | 3–0 | 2–2 |
| Colima | 4–0 | 3–1 | 0–2 | 1–1 | — | 0–1 | 2–2 | 0–2 | 0–0 | 2–0 | 1–1 | 1–0 | 3–3 | 0–3 | 0–0 | 3–3 | 1–1 | 1–4 | 1–2 | 0–1 | 1–2 | 2–2 | 3–0 | 2–2 |
| Coyotes Neza | 2–0 | 2–0 | 2–0 | 3–1 | 3–3 | — | 3–0 | 3–2 | 3–0 | 4–1 | 3–2 | 4–1 | 3–3 | 1–1 | 4–0 | 1–3 | 6–1 | 1–1 | 1–0 | 2–1 | 2–2 | 1–1 | 4–1 | 0–0 |
| Cuautla | 1–0 | 0–0 | 3–0 | 0–0 | 2–0 | 0–2 | — | 1–1 | 1–1 | 0–0 | 2–1 | 0–0 | 1–3 | 2–0 | 0–0 | 1–1 | 3–1 | 0–0 | 0–1 | 3–1 | 2–1 | 1–5 | 1–1 | 1–0 |
| Estado de México | 4–1 | 2–1 | 1–2 | 3–0 | 0–0 | 1–0 | 3–0 | — | 1–1 | 1–2 | 1–1 | 3–0 | 1–2 | 0–3 | 1–2 | 4–3 | 2–0 | 2–0 | 5–1 | 1–0 | 3–4 | 2–3 | 2–0 | 1–1 |
| Irapuato | 0–1 | 4–1 | 1–1 | 3–2 | 3–1 | 1–2 | 3–1 | 0–2 | — | 1–3 | 0–0 | 0–1 | 4–2 | 2–1 | 2–2 | 2–1 | 1–0 | 3–2 | 1–2 | 0–0 | 1–1 | 0–0 | 2–1 | 1–1 |
| Jalisco | 1–1 | 1–1 | 1–3 | 3–0 | 3–1 | 0–0 | 2–0 | 3–1 | 4–2 | — | 2–0 | 4–1 | 1–1 | 2–0 | 3–0 | 5–2 | 3–1 | 4–1 | 0–1 | 4–1 | 3–0 | 5–5 | 2–1 | 2–1 |
| La Piedad | 1–3 | 1–2 | 5–2 | 3–0 | 2–1 | 0–0 | 1–1 | 0–1 | 0–0 | 0–0 | — | 0–1 | 1–0 | 1–0 | 1–0 | 1–3 | 6–4 | 1–2 | 3–0 | 1–0 | 0–0 | 1–2 | 2–2 | 1–1 |
| Lobos Tlaxcala | 0–2 | 1–2 | 2–1 | 1–0 | 3–3 | 0–0 | 2–0 | 0–1 | 1–1 | 2–2 | 1–1 | — | 1–2 | 2–1 | 0–1 | 2–2 | 0–2 | 3–2 | 0–0 | 1–2 | 0–3 | 2–1 | 2–3 | 0–0 |
| Nuevo Necaxa | 4–0 | 2–0 | 2–4 | 3–1 | 6–2 | 1–1 | 1–0 | 2–0 | 2–1 | 2–1 | 5–0 | 3–3 | — | 2–2 | 2–3 | 1–0 | 2–1 | 0–2 | 1–1 | 2–2 | 0–0 | 1–0 | 0–1 | 1–1 |
| Oaxtepec | 1–2 | 0–3 | 2–1 | 4–2 | 3–1 | 1–0 | 1–1 | 0–0 | 0–1 | 2–0 | 7–1 | 6–1 | 1–1 | — | 3–1 | 1–2 | 1–1 | 1–1 | 1–1 | 3–0 | 5–2 | 0–0 | 1–1 | 2–0 |
| Pachuca | 1–1 | 1–1 | 1–0 | 1–2 | 2–0 | 1–4 | 5–2 | 0–2 | 1–1 | 0–2 | 1–1 | 3–2 | 3–1 | 1–1 | — | 3–1 | 2–1 | 1–1 | 1–2 | 3–0 | 2–3 | 1–3 | 2–2 | 0–0 |
| Salamanca | 2–0 | 2–3 | 3–1 | 7–1 | 0–0 | 1–0 | 1–1 | 1–3 | 3–0 | 1–1 | 2–1 | 2–0 | 3–1 | 2–1 | 1–0 | — | 0–0 | 1–3 | 0–1 | 3–0 | 3–2 | 0–1 | 3–0 | 1–1 |
| SUOO | 0–0 | 1–0 | 2–0 | 2–3 | 2–0 | 3–1 | 0–0 | 1–1 | 2–0 | 4–2 | 2–0 | 3–1 | 2–0 | 1–0 | 0–2 | 1–1 | — | 0–0 | 1–2 | 4–1 | 1–1 | 1–0 | 1–0 | 3–0 |
| Tapatío | 1–1 | 2–3 | 2–1 | 4–0 | 0–0 | 2–0 | 1–2 | 2–0 | 1–1 | 0–1 | 2–2 | 0–1 | 2–1 | 1–1 | 1–0 | 4–1 | 1–1 | — | 3–1 | 1–0 | 2–0 | 3–2 | 2–1 | 4–1 |
| Tepic | 3–2 | 3–1 | 3–1 | 0–0 | 3–0 | 2–2 | 1–0 | 0–2 | 3–1 | 1–1 | 1–0 | 2–1 | 1–0 | 3–0 | 1–0 | 2–1 | 0–0 | 2–0 | — | 0–0 | 3–1 | 0–1 | 1–1 | 2–3 |
| Tuberos | 1–0 | 2–2 | 1–2 | 3–1 | 2–0 | 2–1 | 1–0 | 0–1 | 3–2 | 1–0 | 2–1 | 0–2 | 2–2 | 1–1 | 1–1 | 2–3 | 3–4 | 2–2 | 2–0 | — | 3–0 | 2–0 | 3–2 | 1–0 |
| Tulancingo | 0–0 | 2–2 | 4–4 | 4–2 | 3–2 | 1–2 | 1–1 | 0–0 | 0–2 | 0–0 | 3–2 | 3–1 | 1–1 | 0–0 | 2–0 | 2–2 | 1–2 | 3–0 | 2–2 | 2–0 | — | 1–0 | 2–1 | 0–0 |
| UV | 1–0 | 1–1 | 2–0 | 1–0 | 1–0 | 0–0 | 2–0 | 1–2 | 0–0 | 0–0 | 2–3 | 1–1 | 3–1 | 1–1 | 3–0 | 2–1 | 1–1 | 1–1 | 2–3 | 1–0 | 1–2 | — | 2–2 | 0–0 |
| Veracruz | 2–0 | 3–1 | 1–0 | 2–0 | 3–0 | 1–1 | 5–0 | 2–0 | 2–0 | 1–1 | 3–2 | 4–0 | 1–1 | 0–1 | 4–2 | 2–1 | 1–0 | 2–2 | 2–0 | 2–0 | 1–0 | 2–1 | — | 2–1 |
| Zamora | 2–0 | 2–0 | 0–1 | 4–0 | 0–1 | 0–1 | 1–1 | 0–1 | 2–0 | 1–1 | 0–0 | 2–0 | 2–2 | 2–0 | 0–0 | 1–0 | 0–2 | 3–2 | 4–0 | 0–1 | 1–1 | 2–0 | 1–1 | — |

Source: RSSSF
Legend: Blue = home team win; Yellow = draw; Red = away team win.

== Final stage ==
=== Group 1 ===
| Pos | Team | Pld | W | D | L | GF | GA | GD | Pts | Promotion | TAP | JAL | VER | EDM |
|---|---|---|---|---|---|---|---|---|---|---|---|---|---|---|
| 1 | Tapatío (Q) | 6 | 4 | 2 | 0 | 11 | 5 | +6 | 12 | Qualified to Final | | 1–1 | 1–0 | 2–0 |
| 2 | Jalisco | 6 | 3 | 2 | 1 | 8 | 4 | +4 | 10 | | 0–2 | | 2–0 | 3–0 |
| 3 | Veracruz | 6 | 1 | 1 | 4 | 8 | 11 | −3 | 4 | | 2–2 | 0–1 | | 5–3 |
| 4 | Estado de México | 6 | 1 | 1 | 4 | 8 | 15 | −7 | 3 | | 2–3 | 1–1 | 2–1 | |

Source: RSSSF
Rules for classification: 1st points; 2nd head-to-head points; 3rd head-to-head goal difference; 4th head-to-head goals scored; 5th goal difference; 6th number of goals scored
(Q) Qualified for the phase indicated

=== Group 2 ===
| Pos | Team | Pld | W | D | L | GF | GA | GD | Pts | Promotion | ATM | COY | OAX | TEP |
|---|---|---|---|---|---|---|---|---|---|---|---|---|---|---|
| 1 | Atlético Morelia (Q) | 6 | 2 | 3 | 1 | 8 | 4 | +4 | 9 | Qualified to Final | | 3–1 | 0–0 | 4–1 |
| 2 | Coyotes Neza | 6 | 3 | 1 | 2 | 10 | 7 | +3 | 8 | | 1–1 | | 2–1 | 4–0 |
| 3 | Oaxtepec | 6 | 3 | 2 | 1 | 8 | 6 | +2 | 8 | | 1–0 | 2–1 | | 2–1 |
| 4 | Tepic | 6 | 0 | 2 | 4 | 4 | 13 | −9 | 2 | | 0–0 | 0–1 | 2–2 | |

Source: RSSSF
Rules for classification: 1st points; 2nd head-to-head points; 3rd head-to-head goal difference; 4th head-to-head goals scored; 5th goal difference; 6th number of goals scored
(Q) Qualified for the phase indicated

=== Final ===
July 19, 1981
12:00

| Tapatío | 1–1 | Atlético Morelia |
|---|---|---|
| Eduardo Vázquez 45' | Report | Horacio Rocha 5' (pen.) |

Unidad Deportiva Hermanos López Rayón, Uruapan

July 26, 1981
12:00

| Atlético Morelia | 1–0 | Tapatío |
|---|---|---|
| Horacio Rocha 28' (pen.) | Report |

Estadio Venustiano Carranza, Morelia
