= 1985–86 Mexican Segunda División season =

Segunda División de México
- Season: 1985–86
- Champions: Cobras (1st Title)
- Promoted: La Piedad; Búfalos Curtidores
- Relegated: Poza Rica; Córdoba; San Mateo Atenco
- Matches: 418
- Goals: 1,131 (2.71 per match)
- Top goalscorer: José Antonio Manzanares (24 goals)

The 1985–86 Segunda División was the 37th season of the Mexican Segunda División. The season started on 16 August 1985 and concluded on 18 May 1986. It was won by Cobras.

Since this season, the regional competition system was eliminated and the matches between all the member teams returned for two rounds.

== Changes ==
- Irapuato was promoted to Primera División.
- Zacatepec was relegated from Primera División.
- La Piedad was promoted from Segunda División B.
- Búfalos Curtidores was promoted from Tercera División, due to this promotion, the first Unión de Curtidores team was bought by the Government of Quintana Roo, moved to Chetumal and renamed as Chicleros de Chetumal.
- Nuevo Necaxa was relegated to Segunda División B, however, the club board bought the Tulancingo franchise and remained at Segunda División. Also, the team was relocated at Tulancingo.
- Pumas ENEP was promoted from Segunda División B, however, the franchise was bought by Chapulineros de Oaxaca and that team took its place in the league.
- Texcoco sold its franchise to Atlacomulco.

== Teams ==
1985–86 season Teams

Club	City	Stadium
Atlacomulco	Atlacomulco	Estadio Municipal de Atlacomulco
Búfalos Curtidores	León	Estadio La Martinica
Chetumal	Chetumal	Estadio José López Portillo
Cobras	Querétaro City	Estadio Corregidora
Colima	Colima City	Estadio Colima
Córdoba	Córdoba	Estadio Rafael Murillo Vidal
Jalisco	Guadalajara	Estadio Jalisco
La Piedad	La Piedad	Estadio Juan N. López
Nuevo Necaxa	Tulancingo	Estadio Primero de Mayo
Oaxaca	Oaxaca City	Estadio Gral. Manuel Cabrera Carrasquedo
Pachuca	Pachuca	Estadio Revolución Mexicana
Poza Rica	Poza Rica	Estadio Heriberto Jara Corona
Salamanca	Salamanca	Estadio El Molinito
San Mateo Atenco	San Mateo Atenco	Estadio Municipal San Mateo Atenco
Santos Laguna	Torreón	Estadio Moctezuma
Tecomán	Tecomán	Estadio IAETAC
Tepic	Tepic	Estadio Nicolás Álvarez Ortega
UAQ	Querétaro City	Estadio Corregidora
UAT	Ciudad Victoria	Estadio Marte R. Gómez
Zacatepec	Zacatepec	Estadio Agustín "Coruco" Díaz

== Group stage ==
=== Group 1 ===
Pos	Team	Pld	W	D	L	GF	GA	GD	Pts	Qualification or relegation
1	Pachuca (Q)	38	21	5	12	78	42	+36	64	Qualified to Playoffs
2	La Piedad (Q)	38	20	8	10	60	38	+22	61	Qualified to Playoffs
3	Atlacomulco	38	14	12	12	60	56	+4	50	
4	UAQ	38	13	13	12	42	46	−4	45	
5	Chetumal	38	13	7	18	48	58	−10	41	Relegation Group

Source: RSSSF
(Q) Qualified for the phase indicated

=== Group 2 ===
Pos	Team	Pld	W	D	L	GF	GA	GD	Pts	Qualification or relegation
1	Tepic (Q)	38	15	14	9	55	49	+6	53	Qualified to Playoffs
2	UAT (Q)	38	16	9	13	52	51	+1	49	Qualified to Playoffs
3	Oaxaca	38	13	10	15	48	50	−2	45	
4	Colima	38	11	15	12	49	55	−6	44	
5	Córdoba	38	10	12	16	39	66	−27	35	Relegation Group

Source: RSSSF
(Q) Qualified for the phase indicated

=== Group 3 ===
Pos	Team	Pld	W	D	L	GF	GA	GD	Pts	Qualification or relegation
1	Tecomán (Q)	38	18	9	11	85	59	+26	62	Qualified to Playoffs
2	Cobras (Q)	38	18	11	9	72	46	+26	62	Qualified to Playoffs
3	Salamanca	38	13	10	15	42	40	+2	46	
4	Nuevo Necaxa	38	14	6	18	45	54	−9	43	
5	San Mateo Atenco	28	9	10	9	38	62	−24	34	Relegation Group

Source: RSSSF
(Q) Qualified for the phase indicated

=== Group 4 ===
Pos	Team	Pld	W	D	L	GF	GA	GD	Pts	Qualification or relegation
1	Zacatepec (Q)	38	16	11	11	58	44	+14	57	Qualified to Playoffs
2	Jalisco (Q)	38	16	10	12	42	41	+1	53	Qualified to Playoffs
3	Santos Laguna	38	14	11	13	45	38	+7	48	
4	Búfalos Curtidores	38	8	13	17	49	64	−15	35	Relegation Group
5	Poza Rica (R)	38	5	10	23	28	76	−48	21	Relegated

Source: RSSSF
(Q) Qualified for the phase indicated; (R) Relegated

== Results ==
Home \ Away	ATL	BFC	CHE	COB	COL	COR	JAL	LPD	NEC	OAX	PAC	PZR	SAL	SMA	SAN	TEC	TEP	UAQ	UAT	ZAC
Atlacomulco	—	1–0	4–1	4–1	1–1	3–1	4–0	3–1	3–1	1–0	1–1	4–0	2–0	0–0	3–2	2–3	3–2	0–0	5–1	1–1
Búfalos Curtidores	6–0	—	3–0	1–1	5–1	2–2	4–2	1–1	1–0	2–0	1–1	2–2	2–1	3–0	0–2	0–4	1–1	0–0	2–2	1–1
Chetumal	1–1	3–0	—	0–1	4–1	1–0	3–0	1–1	1–4	2–1	1–1	2–2	4–2	2–0	3–0	1–0	1–2	2–1	2–1	1–1
Cobras	6–2	3–0	4–1	—	3–1	4–1	4–1	1–2	3–1	2–0	2–1	3–1	0–2	8–1	2–0	1–1	2–3	0–0	1–0	3–2
Colima	2–2	2–1	3–1	0–2	—	1–1	1–1	1–1	2–0	4–1	1–0	5–1	1–0	3–2	0–0	1–1	1–1	3–0	1–1	2–2
Córdoba	2–1	3–2	0–0	2–2	1–0	—	0–1	2–1	0–0	3–5	3–2	2–0	1–1	2–1	1–1	2–1	0–4	0–1	1–1	1–2
Jalisco	3–0	1–1	1–0	0–0	3–0	2–0	—	2–1	1–0	0–0	0–1	4–1	0–0	0–2	2–0	1–0	1–1	3–0	2–0	1–0
La Piedad	1–0	1–0	1–0	2–0	3–1	0–0	0–1	—	4–0	2–1	0–2	2–0	2–0	1–0	1–0	6–2	4–1	3–2	1–1	3–0
Nuevo Necaxa	2–1	1–1	3–1	1–1	0–0	0–1	2–0	1–0	—	1–0	2–1	3–1	2–0	5–2	1–2	3–0	1–0	1–1	2–3	1–1
Oaxaca	2–0	5–1	0–1	1–1	2–1	1–0	3–1	1–1	2–0	—	0–2	4–1	0–0	2–2	1–1	3–1	1–1	3–1	1–0	1–0
Pachuca	2–1	1–0	5–2	2–2	3–0	7–1	3–1	1–2	3–0	4–0	—	7–2	1–0	2–0	3–1	1–2	6–0	4–2	3–0	1–0
Poza Rica	1–1	0–0	1–1	1–1	2–2	1–0	0–1	0–0	0–2	0–2	1–2	—	0–2	1–0	1–2	0–3	1–0	1–1	2–1	1–3
Salamanca	1–1	2–0	2–0	0–1	1–1	2–0	3–1	2–1	1–2	2–0	1–0	1–0	—	2–0	0–0	2–2	2–2	1–2	2–2	0–1
San Mateo Atenco	0–1	3–2	1–0	0–0	0–0	1–1	1–1	0–1	2–0	1–1	5–2	2–0	3–1	—	0–0	1–3	2–3	3–0	1–1	2–1
Santos Laguna	2–1	1–0	0–1	2–0	1–0	6–1	0–0	2–0	4–0	2–0	2–1	0–0	0–0	0–0	—	1–1	1–0	3–0	0–1	1–2
Tecomán	5–0	5–0	2–0	1–2	0–2	5–1	1–2	4–3	4–2	2–0	3–1	3–1	1–4	3–0	6–4	—	2–2	1–1	1–1	4–2
Tepic	2–1	1–1	3–1	2–2	2–0	1–1	0–0	1–0	1–0	1–1	0–0	2–0	1–0	3–0	3–2	1–1	—	1–1	3–0	1–0
UAQ	0–0	1–0	1–0	3–2	2–2	0–0	2–0	3–4	2–1	2–0	0–1	0–1	2–1	2–0	0–0	1–1	2–1	—	3–0	2–1
UAT	0–0	5–2	3–2	1–0	0–1	0–1	2–1	1–3	2–0	3–2	1–0	4–1	2–0	1–0	1–0	3–1	4–1	2–1	—	0–0
Zacatepec	2–2	4–1	2–1	3–1	4–1	3–1	1–1	0–0	2–0	1–1	2–0	2–0	0–1	4–0	2–0	1–5	3–1	0–0	2–1	—

Source: RSSSF
Legend: Blue = home team win; Yellow = draw; Red = away team win.

== Final stage ==
=== Group 1 ===
Pos	Team	Pld	W	D	L	GF	GA	GD	Pts	Promotion	PAC	TEC	UAT	JAL
1	Pachuca (Q)	6	4	1	1	10	7	+3	11	Qualified to Final		2–1	3–0	3–2
2	Tecomán	6	2	3	1	12	10	+2	9		1–1		3–1	3–3
3	UAT	6	2	1	3	6	8	−2	6		3–0	0–0		1–0
4	Jalisco	6	1	1	4	10	13	−3	3		0–1	3–4	2–1	

Source: RSSSF
Rules for classification: 1st points; 2nd head-to-head points; 3rd head-to-head goal difference; 4th head-to-head goals scored; 5th goal difference; 6th number of goals scored
(Q) Qualified for the phase indicated

=== Group 2 ===
Pos	Team	Pld	W	D	L	GF	GA	GD	Pts	Promotion	COB	LPD	TEP	ZAC
1	Cobras (Q)	6	3	2	1	9	5	+4	11	Qualified to Final		1–1	4–1	2–0
2	La Piedad	6	2	2	2	6	5	+1	7		2–0		1–1	1–0
3	Tepic	6	2	2	2	7	8	−1	7		1–1	1–0		3–1
4	Zacatepec	6	2	0	4	4	8	−4	4		0–1	2–1	1–0	

Source: RSSSF
Rules for classification: 1st points; 2nd head-to-head points; 3rd head-to-head goal difference; 4th head-to-head goals scored; 5th goal difference; 6th number of goals scored
(Q) Qualified for the phase indicated

=== Final ===
May 11, 1986

Cobras	2–0	Pachuca
	Report

Estadio Corregidora, Querétaro City

May 18, 1986

Pachuca	1–1	Cobras
	Report

Estadio Revolución Mexicana, Pachuca

== Relegation Group ==
Pos	Team	Pld	W	D	L	GF	GA	GD	Pts	Promotion	BFC	CHE	COR	SMA
1	Búfalos Curtidores	6	5	0	1	9	3	+6	13			3–0	1–0	1–0
2	Chetumal	6	1	3	2	8	9	−1	6		3–0		1–1	0–1
3	Córdoba (R)	6	1	3	2	6	8	−2	6	Relegated	0–2	2–2		1–1
4	San Mateo Atenco (R)	6	1	2	3	5	8	−3	5	Relegated	0–2	2–2	1–2	

Source: RSSSF
Rules for classification: 1st points; 2nd head-to-head points; 3rd head-to-head goal difference; 4th head-to-head goals scored; 5th goal difference; 6th number of goals scored
(R) Relegated
