= Alberto Jorge =

Argentine footballer and manager (1950–2024)

Personal information
- Full name: Alberto Mario Jorge Espósito
- Date of birth: 1 January 1950
- Place of birth: Villa Maza, Buenos Aires Province, Argentina
- Date of death: 3 September 2024 (aged 74)
- Position: Midfielder

Senior career*
Years	Team	Apps	(Gls)
1970–1975	Racing	167	(39)
1975–1980	León	168	(52)
1980–1982	Atlante	44	(3)
1982–1984	Oaxtepec	52	(23)

Managerial career
- 2000: Racing
- 2002–2003: Toluca
- 2009–2010: Xelajú
- * Club domestic league appearances and goals

Alberto Mario Jorge Espósito (1 January 1950 – 3 September 2024) was an Argentine football player and manager. He spent most of his career in Mexico, where he arrived in 1975 to play with León.

As a manager, he won a Primera División title with Toluca as caretaker, coaching the team in the last four games of the tournament (the two legs of the playoffs semi-finals and the two legs of the final). Jorge is the first caretaker manager to have won a league title in the Liga MX.

== Club career ==
Jorge started his professional football career with Racing Club de Avellaneda in 1970 as a midfielder. During his spell with Racing, Jorge played 167 matches and scored 39 goals. At some point, Jorge was considered by César Luis Menotti in his preliminary lists for the 1978 FIFA World Cup Argentine squad, despite this, knowing that his chances to make it to the World Cup were remote, he decided to continue his career in Mexico.

Alberto Jorge arrived in Mexico in 1975, where he would spend most of his career as a footballer. He first played for León from 1975 to 1980, a club that paid US$12,000 for his transfer. In five seasons with the club, he played in 168 matches and scored 52 goals.

Jorge then moved to Atlante, where he played from 1980 to 1982, having 44 appearances and scoring three goals. He was part of the squad that were runners-up to UANL in the 1981–82 season.

In the last stage of his career, Jorge played for Oaxtepec from 1982, the team's first season in the Mexican Primera División, till 1984. As a player for Oaxtepec, Jorge made 52 appearances and scored 23 goals, 21 in the 1982–83 season, including a hat-trick against Atlas. Also, he was the runner-up top scorer for the Mexican Primera División that season, second to América's Norberto Outes, who scored 22 goals, only one more than Jorge.

== Managerial career ==
=== Toluca ===
Jorge was appointed interim head coach of Toluca in the playoffs of the Apertura 2002, after Uruguayan Wilson Graniolatti resigned as manager of the team.

For the Apertura 2002 tournament, Ricardo La Volpe was the manager of the club for the regular part of the tournament, but was called to manage Mexico national football team just before the beginning of the playoff round of the tournament. La Volpe's assistant coach, Wilson Graniolatti, was then promoted to head coach.

Claiming differences with Toluca's management after they tried to bring La Volpe back to the team, Graniolatti resigned as head coach after the quarterfinal round of the playoffs, despite winning and qualifying to the semi-final. Alberto Jorge, then head of the Reserves and Academy was appointed manager of the team for the semi-finals round of the tournament.

Toluca won at the semi-finals and advanced to the final against Morelia, which they won, becoming champions of the Primera División. Managing Toluca for only four games (the two legs of the semi-final and two legs of the final), Alberto Jorge became the first caretaker manager to win the Primera División title.

Jorge was re-signed for the Clausura 2003 tournament, but was fired in October 2003 and Ricardo Ferretti took his position for the rest of the tournament, despite winning the Primera División title in the previous tournament and leading Deportivo Toluca to the 2003 CONCACAF Champions' Cup final.

=== Xelajú ===
Jorge arrived to Guatemalan football for the 2009–2010 season as manager of Club Xelajú MC. He resigned from the position in March 2010 and was succeeded by Argentine Horacio Cordero.

== Death ==
Jorge died on 3 September 2024, at the age of 74.

== Honours ==
=== Managerial ===
Toluca

- Primera División: Apertura 2002
