= 1983–84 Mexican Primera División season =

42nd professional season of the top-flight football league in Mexico

Primera División de México
- Season: 1983–84
- Champions: América (4th title)
- Relegated: Unión de Curtidores
- Champions' Cup: América; Guadalajara
- Matches: 394
- Goals: 1,102 (2.8 per match)

Statistics of the Primera División de México for the 1983–84 season.

== Overview ==
It was contested by 20 teams, and América won the championship.

Unión de Curtidores was promoted from Segunda División 1982–83 season, and was relegated from Primera División on this season.

Atlante F.C. was moved from Estadio Azteca to Estadio Azulgrana.

=== Teams ===
Location of the 1983-84 Primera División teams

Team	City	Stadium
América	Mexico City	Azteca
Atlante	Mexico City	Azulgrana
Atlas	Guadalajara, Jalisco	Jalisco
Atlético Potosino	San Luis Potosí, S.L.P.	Plan de San Luis
Cruz Azul	Mexico City	Azteca
Guadalajara	Guadalajara, Jalisco	Jalisco
León	León, Guanajuato	León
Morelia	Morelia, Michoacán	Venustiano Carranza
Monterrey	Monterrey, Nuevo León	Tecnológico
Necaxa	Mexico City	Azteca
Neza	Nezahualcóyotl, State of Mexico	José López Portillo
Oaxtepec	Oaxtepec, Morelos	Olímpico de Oaxtepec
Puebla	Puebla, Puebla	Cuauhtémoc
Tampico Madero	Tampico-Madero, Tamaulipas	Tamaulipas
Tecos	Zapopan, Jalisco	Tres de Marzo
Toluca	Toluca, State of Mexico	Toluca 70
Unión de Curtidores	León, Guanajuato	La Martinica
UANL	Monterrey, Nuevo León	Universitario
UdeG	Guadalajara, Jalisco	Jalisco
UNAM	Mexico City	Olímpico Universitario

== Group stage ==
=== Group 1 ===
Pos	Team	Pld	W	D	L	GF	GA	GD	Pts	Qualification
1	América	38	18	15	5	54	30	+24	51	Playoff
2	Monterrey	38	14	11	13	54	48	+6	39	Playoff
3	Necaxa	38	10	12	16	60	73	−13	32	
4	Atlas	38	9	14	15	53	74	−21	32	
5	Atlético Potosino	38	9	12	17	30	55	−25	30	

=== Group 2 ===
Pos	Team	Pld	W	D	L	GF	GA	GD	Pts	Qualification or relegation
1	Atlante	38	17	13	8	61	43	+18	47	Playoff
2	Guadalajara	38	15	16	7	56	40	+16	46	Playoff
3	Deportivo Neza	38	12	16	10	62	54	+8	40	
4	Toluca	38	14	10	14	57	56	+1	38	
5	Unión de Curtidores	38	6	7	25	35	66	−31	19	Relegated

=== Group 3 ===
Pos	Team	Pld	W	D	L	GF	GA	GD	Pts	Qualification
1	UNAM	38	17	14	7	65	40	+25	48	Playoff
2	Tecos	38	16	13	9	60	45	+15	45	Playoff
3	Tampico Madero	38	16	9	13	64	61	+3	41	
4	Morelia	38	14	11	13	63	55	+8	39	
5	Puebla	38	12	10	16	52	57	−5	34	

=== Group 4 ===
Pos	Team	Pld	W	D	L	GF	GA	GD	Pts	Qualification
1	Cruz Azul	38	14	13	11	47	38	+9	41	Playoff
2	UANL	38	14	12	12	55	58	−3	40	Playoff
3	UDG	38	9	15	14	47	58	−11	33	
4	Oaxtepec	38	12	9	17	45	62	−17	33	
5	León	38	11	10	17	51	58	−7	32	

== Results ==
Home \ Away	AME	ATN	ATL	APO	CRA	GDL	LEO	MTY	MOR	NEC	NEZ	OAX	PUE	TAM	TEC	TOL	UDC	UNL	UDG	UNM
América		1–1	3–1	4–0	1–1	1–1	1–1	0–0	1–0	2–1	0–0	3–1	0–1	2–0	1–0	3–2	2–0	1–1	1–1	1–2
Atlante	2–1		0–0	0–0	3–2	4–2	3–1	1–1	1–1	0–1	1–2	1–0	1–2	4–1	1–1	3–1	0–0	3–0	4–0	1–1
Atlas	0–4	3–4		3–2	2–0	3–5	2–2	2–2	2–2	3–3	1–1	1–0	3–2	2–0	1–1	1–0	1–1	1–0	0–1	0–2
Atlético Potosino	0–0	1–0	2–2		1–0	1–1	0–2	1–1	2–0	2–4	1–1	1–1	1–1	2–1	0–0	1–0	1–0	1–0	1–0	0–0
Cruz Azul	0–2	1–1	5–0	2–0		0–0	0–1	0–0	2–1	4–2	2–2	3–1	1–0	1–0	2–1	2–0	1–1	0–2	1–0	0–0
Guadalajara	1–1	0–1	1–1	2–0	2–0		2–1	2–0	1–0	1–1	3–2	0–1	2–3	1–1	1–1	3–0	2–1	4–1	2–1	1–1
León	1–1	0–1	1–1	0–0	3–2	1–2		4–2	3–2	3–2	1–3	2–0	1–0	3–3	3–0	0–1	1–4	1–2	4–1	0–1
Monterrey	1–0	0–0	7–1	2–0	0–1	2–2	1–1		2–1	2–1	1–0	0–0	2–0	1–0	3–1	3–2	5–1	0–1	3–2	1–3
Morelia	0–0	3–1	2–1	3–2	1–3	1–1	4–2	2–0		3–0	4–4	1–1	0–0	4–1	1–2	4–3	1–2	2–1	1–2	0–0
Necaxa	2–3	2–2	0–2	2–1	0–2	0–0	3–2	1–1	4–3		2–2	2–3	0–1	2–0	3–2	2–0	1–1	1–1	2–1	1–3
Deportivo Neza	1–3	1–1	4–1	1–2	1–1	0–1	0–0	3–1	2–1	1–2		2–3	4–1	2–1	4–3	2–0	5–2	1–1	1–1	3–1
Oaxtepec	1–2	0–1	3–2	3–0	0–0	1–4	2–1	2–2	1–1	2–0	1–1		2–0	1–0	1–3	4–3	1–4	2–0	1–0	0–2
Puebla	0–1	1–1	1–0	4–2	3–2	1–1	0–0	5–3	1–0	4–1	1–2	3–1		3–3	1–1	2–0	1–2	2–2	1–1	2–2
Tampico Madero	2–2	2–1	4–3	2–1	2–2	0–0	4–1	2–1	2–0	2–3	1–0	3–1	1–0		3–1	5–2	2–0	3–1	2–0	2–1
Tecos	0–1	6–1	1–1	2–0	0–0	2–0	0–0	1–0	2–2	3–3	0–0	3–1	2–1	4–0		2–1	2–1	1–0	0–2	2–2
Toluca	2–0	0–1	0–0	5–0	2–1	3–2	1–0	1–0	0–3	3–1	3–1	2–2	3–0	0–1	3–1		2–1	3–2	3–3	1–4
Unión de Curtidores	0–1	3–1	1–0	2–0	0–2	0–0	0–3	1–2	1–1	2–2	0–0	0–0	1–0	1–1	0–0	0–1		1–2	4–1	1–4
UANL	2–2	1–3	2–0	2–0	3–1	2–1	2–1	0–2	1–3	1–0	2–2	2–1	2–1	4–4	1–1	1–0	1–1		0–0	4–3
UDG	1–1	0–5	3–4	1–1	0–0	1–1	3–0	1–0	2–3	2–2	1–1	3–0	4–2	4–3	1–0	1–0	1–1	2–2		1–1
UNAM	2–1	1–2	2–2	1–0	0–0	0–1	2–0	2–0	1–2	1–1	1–2	4–0	2–1	0–0	4–1	4–1	1–4	3–3	0–0	

Legend: Blue = home team win; Yellow = draw; Red = away team win.

== Playoff ==
Quarter-finals
1	América	1	1	2
11	Monterrey	1	0	1
3	Atlante	2	1	3 (2)
6	Cruz Azul (p.)	1	2	3 (4)
2	UNAM	0	3	3
9	UANL	1	0	1
4	Guadalajara (p.)	0	1	1 (9)
5	Tecos	1	0	1 (8)

Semi-finals
1	América	2	0	2
6	Cruz Azul	0	0	0
2	UNAM	1	2	3 (3)
4	Guadalajara (p.)	2	1	3 (5)

Final
1	América	2	3	5
4	Guadalajara	2	1	3

1983-84 winners

4th title
