= Marco Jovanni Rojas =

Mexican footballer (born 1995)

Personal information
- Full name: Marco Jovanni Rojas Jiménez
- Date of birth: 1 February 1995 (age 31)
- Place of birth: Mexico City, Mexico
- Height: 1.70 m (5 ft 7 in)
- Position: Defensive midfielder

Team information
- Current team: Cruz Azul Hidalgo
- Number: 99

Senior career*
Years	Team	Apps	(Gls)
2009–	Pachuca	0	(0)
2012–2013	→ Tulancingo (loan)	18	(0)
2015–2016	→ Santos de Guápiles (loan)	14	(3)
2016–2018	→ Tlaxcala (loan)	43	(1)
2018–	→ Cruz Azul Hidalgo (loan)	14	(0)
- * Club domestic league appearances and goals as of 2 October 2019

Marco Jovanni Rojas Jiménez (born February 1, 1995) is a professional Mexican footballer who currently plays for Cruz Azul Hidalgo on loan from C.F. Pachuca. He made his professional debut for Pachuca during a Copa MX defeat to Alebrijes de Oaxaca on 27 August 2013.
