= Federico Guerra =

Federico Guerra may refer to:

- Federico Guerra (footballer, born 1983), Uruguayan forward
- Federico Guerra (footballer, born 1990), Argentine midfielder
