= Federico Guerra (footballer, born 1983) =

Uruguayan footballer

Personal information
- Full name: Federico Guerra Alanís
- Date of birth: 30 January 1983 (age 43)
- Place of birth: Florida, Uruguay
- Height: 1.78 m (5 ft 10 in)
- Position: Forward

Senior career*
Years	Team	Apps	(Gls)
2003–2004	Fénix	20	(2)
2004	Cobras	11	(0)
2007	Deportivo Mictlán		
2007–2008	Atenas	21	(6)
2008	Rampla Juniors	7	(0)
2010	Atenas	4	(1)
Total		64	(9)
- * Club domestic league appearances and goals

Federico Guerra Alanís (born 30 January 1983) is a Uruguayan former professional footballer who played as a forward.

== Career ==
Guerra began his career with Fénix, making twenty appearances and netting two goals across two seasons in the Primera División. Mexican second tier team Cobras signed Guerra in 2004, with the forward appearing twelve times in Primera División A; his last match was a 1–0 defeat to Lobos BUAP on 6 November 2004. In 2007, Guerra featured for Liga Nacional side Deportivo Mictlán. He spent the rest of 2006–07 with the Guatemalans, ending with relegation. Guerra subsequently went back to Uruguay with Atenas. Six goals in twenty-one came. Guerra then had stints with Rampla Juniors and, again, Atenas between 2008 and 2010.

== Career statistics ==
As of 1 February 2019.

Club statistics
Club	Season	League			Cup		Continental		Other		Total	
Club	Season	Division	Apps	Goals	Apps	Goals	Apps	Goals	Apps	Goals	Apps	Goals
Cobras	2004–05	Primera División A	11	0	0	0	—		0	0	11	0
Atenas	2007–08	Segunda División	21	6	—		—		0	0	21	6
Atenas	2009–10	Primera División	4	1	—		—		0	0	4	1
Atenas	Total		25	7	—		—		0	0	25	7
Career total			36	7	0	0	—		0	0	36	7
