= 1982–83 Mexican Primera División season =

41st professional season of the top-flight football league in Mexico

Primera División de México
- Season: 1982–83
- Champions: Puebla (1st title)
- Relegated: Zacatepec
- Champions' Cup: Puebla; Guadalajara
- Matches: 394
- Goals: 1,029 (2.61 per match)

Statistics of the Primera División de México for the 1982–83 season.

== Overview ==
It was contested by 20 teams, and Puebla won the championship.

C.F. Oaxtepec was promoted from Segunda División.

Zacatepec was relegated to Segunda División.

=== Teams ===
Location of the 1982-83 Primera División teams

Team	City	Stadium
América	Mexico City	Azteca
Atlante	Mexico City	Azteca
Atlas	Guadalajara, Jalisco	Jalisco
Atlético Potosino	San Luis Potosí, S.L.P.	Plan de San Luis
Cruz Azul	Mexico City	Azteca
Guadalajara	Guadalajara, Jalisco	Jalisco
León	León, Guanajuato	León
Morelia	Morelia, Michoacán	Venustiano Carranza
Monterrey	Monterrey, Nuevo León	Tecnológico
Necaxa	Mexico City	Azteca
Neza	Nezahualcóyotl, State of Mexico	José López Portillo
Oaxtepec	Oaxtepec, Morelos	Olímpico de Oaxtepec / Cuauhtémoc
Puebla	Puebla, Puebla	Cuauhtémoc
Tampico Madero	Tampico-Madero, Tamaulipas	Tamaulipas
Tecos	Zapopan, Jalisco	Tres de Marzo
Toluca	Toluca, State of Mexico	Toluca 70
UANL	Monterrey, Nuevo León	Universitario
UdeG	Guadalajara, Jalisco	Jalisco
UNAM	Mexico City	Olímpico Universitario
Zacatepec	Zacatepec, Morelos	Agustín Coruco Díaz

== Moves ==
- The owner of Atlético Español decided to sell the team to the Mexican league. This gave way for Necaxa to come back to play.
- Tampico was relegated to Segunda División, however, the oil workers union bought the Atletas Campesinos franchise, they moved the team to Tampico and was renamed as Tampico Madero.

== Group stage ==
=== Group 1 ===
Pos	Team	Pld	W	D	L	GF	GA	GD	Pts	Qualification
1	Atlante	38	18	11	9	66	46	+20	47	Playoff
2	Atlético Potosino	38	13	10	15	45	60	−15	36	Playoff
3	Atlas	38	10	13	15	44	58	−14	33	
4	Necaxa	38	8	16	14	50	61	−11	32	
5	Monterrey	38	9	13	16	33	47	−14	31	

=== Group 2 ===
Pos	Team	Pld	W	D	L	GF	GA	GD	Pts	Qualification
1	América	38	26	9	3	69	27	+42	61	Playoff
2	Guadalajara	38	13	14	11	44	37	+7	40	Playoff
3	León	38	12	13	13	52	63	−11	37	
4	Deportivo Neza	38	11	13	14	47	48	−1	35	
5	Tampico Madero	38	12	9	17	49	61	−12	33	

=== Group 3 ===
Pos	Team	Pld	W	D	L	GF	GA	GD	Pts	Qualification or relegation
1	Toluca	38	17	10	11	62	43	+19	44	Playoff
2	Tecos	38	15	11	12	55	52	+3	41	Playoff
3	Cruz Azul	38	10	15	13	41	39	+2	35	
4	Oaxtepec	38	12	8	18	55	63	−8	32	
5	Zacatepec	38	6	18	14	30	39	−9	30	Relegated

=== Group 4 ===
Pos	Team	Pld	W	D	L	GF	GA	GD	Pts	Qualification
1	Puebla	38	15	15	8	53	39	+14	45	Playoff
2	UDG	38	15	13	10	53	48	+5	43	Playoff
3	UNAM	38	14	10	14	53	43	+10	38	
4	UANL	38	12	13	13	47	53	−6	37	
5	Morelia	38	11	8	19	35	56	−21	30	

== Results ==
Home \ Away	AME	ATN	ATL	APO	CRA	GDL	LEO	MTY	MOR	NEC	NEZ	OAX	PUE	TAM	TEC	TOL	UNL	UDG	UNM	ZAC
América		1–0	2–1	4–0	0–0	2–0	3–1	3–0	2–1	5–0	2–1	2–0	2–0	2–1	2–1	1–1	2–1	1–1	2–0	2–1
Atlante	0–1		4–2	5–0	1–1	1–0	1–3	1–0	3–0	1–1	1–2	3–2	3–1	1–1	0–2	4–3	5–0	1–0	2–0	0–0
Atlas	3–3	0–1		0–0	4–1	2–2	2–1	0–1	0–1	0–0	3–1	1–1	1–1	1–1	1–1	3–1	3–0	2–4	2–2	0–0
Atlético Potosino	0–2	1–3	1–0		2–0	1–0	1–1	1–0	4–2	3–2	1–1	0–1	2–1	3–1	1–1	2–3	1–2	1–1	0–3	1–0
Cruz Azul	1–1	1–1	4–0	0–0		0–2	2–1	2–0	1–1	1–1	2–1	3–0	0–1	3–0	0–0	3–2	1–1	2–0	2–1	1–1
Guadalajara	0–2	1–1	1–1	2–1	1–0		6–0	1–1	2–1	0–0	2–1	2–2	0–0	4–0	1–0	1–0	3–3	0–1	4–3	1–0
León	0–4	1–2	2–2	3–3	3–2	1–1		1–1	1–0	3–3	2–2	2–1	2–1	0–0	3–0	1–1	0–0	1–2	0–0	1–0
Monterrey	2–3	1–1	1–0	4–1	1–0	0–0	2–3		2–1	2–1	1–1	1–0	0–0	2–2	3–0	0–0	1–1	0–0	1–2	1–1
Morelia	2–0	1–2	1–1	1–2	0–3	0–0	0–1	0–0		2–1	0–0	2–1	0–0	2–1	1–0	3–2	1–0	2–0	1–3	3–0
Necaxa	1–0	1–1	0–2	1–2	2–1	0–0	0–3	2–2	1–1		0–1	2–2	1–1	4–2	2–3	3–2	2–2	4–0	4–0	1–1
Deportivo Neza	0–2	4–1	1–3	3–0	0–0	0–1	3–0	3–0	1–0	1–1		1–2	1–2	3–1	1–0	0–0	2–1	1–1	2–5	1–0
Oaxtepec	0–2	1–4	4–0	1–2	1–0	2–1	2–2	2–0	4–0	1–3	2–2		1–2	1–0	1–2	2–2	2–2	0–3	1–2	2–1
Puebla	2–2	3–1	1–2	2–2	0–0	2–1	3–2	3–0	4–2	3–0	1–0	1–1		2–0	3–0	2–1	3–1	3–0	0–0	0–0
Tampico	1–2	1–1	0–1	1–0	4–3	1–0	1–1	2–3	3–1	3–2	2–1	1–0	3–1		4–3	2–3	3–2	3–2	2–0	1–2
Tecos	1–1	2–1	0–1	1–0	0–0	1–1	2–1	1–0	0–1	2–0	0–0	3–1	5–2	1–0		1–4	2–1	1–1	1–0	2–1
Toluca	2–0	1–1	5–0	3–0	3–1	3–0	2–0	1–0	2–0	4–2	3–1	3–2	0–0	3–1	3–0		1–2	1–1	2–2	0–0
UANL	0–1	2–1	2–0	1–4	0–0	1–0	2–3	2–0	3–0	0–0	2–0	3–2	1–0	0–0	1–1	0–3		1–1	1–3	3–0
U. de G.	1–1	3–3	1–0	1–1	2–0	2–1	4–0	1–0	3–1	3–0	2–2	2–4	1–1	0–0	1–0	0–3	0–1		1–0	2–0
UNAM	1–1	1–2	5–0	2–0	1–0	0–1	0–1	3–0	3–0	0–0	1–1	1–2	0–0	1–0	2–0	5–1	0–0	1–4		0–0
Zacatepec	0–1	1–2	1–0	1–1	0–0	1–1	2–1	1–0	0–0	1–2	1–1	0–1	1–1	0–0	2–2	1–1	2–2	5–1	2–0	

Legend: Blue = home team win; Yellow = draw; Red = away team win.

== Relegation playoff ==
May 15, 1983

Atlético Morelia	2–0	Zacatepec
Luis Jaime 66'; Jaime Salgado 69'	Report

Estadio Venustiano Carranza, Morelia
May 22, 1983

Zacatepec	4–2	Atlético Morelia
Francisco Fernández 26'; Marlon Dávila 44', 62'; Arturo Magaña 79' (pen.)	Report	Horacio Rocha 15'; Jacinto Ambríz 76'

Estadio Agustín Coruco Díaz, Zacatepec
May 25, 1983

Atlético Morelia	1–0	Zacatepec
Jacinto Ambríz 81'	Report

Estadio Azteca, Mexico City

Atlético Morelia won 5-4 on aggregate. Zacatepec was relegated to Segunda División

== Playoff ==
Quarterfinals
1	América	2	4	6
8	Atlético Potosino	0	0	0
2	Atlante	1	0	1
7	Guadalajara	3	3	6
3	Puebla	1	5	6
6	UAG	2	1	3
4	Toluca	0	3	3
5	UdeG	2	2	4

Semifinals
1	América	2	0	2
7	Guadalajara	1	3	4
3	Puebla	0	4	4
5	UdeG	1	2	3

Finals
7	Guadalajara	2	0	2 (6)
3	Puebla (p)	1	1	2 (7)

Puebla won the championship.

=== Quarterfinal ===
May 12, 1983

Atlético Potosino	0–2	América
	Report	Norberto Outes 48'; Nilton Pinheiro Batata 75'

Estadio Plan de San Luis, San Luis Potosí
May 15, 1983

América	4–0	Atlético Potosino
Norberto Outes 12', 30'; Alfredo Tena 35'; Javier Aguirre 62'	Report

Estadio Azteca, Mexico City

América won 6-0 on aggregate.

May 11, 1983

Guadalajara	3–1	Atlante
Ricardo Pérez 1'; Sergio Lugo 80'; Fernando Dávalos 84'	Report	Eduardo Rergis 25'

Estadio Jalisco, Guadalajara
May 14, 1983

Atlante	0–3	Guadalajara
	Report	Fernando Dávalos 15'; Jaime Pajarito 70', 80'

Estadio Azteca, Mexico City

Guadalajara won 1-6 on aggregate.

May 12, 1983

UAG	2–1	Puebla
Javier Hernández 28'; Edmur Lucas 64'	Report	Muricy Ramalho 68'

Estadio Tres de Marzo, Zapopan
May 15, 1983

Puebla	5–1	UAG
José Luis Ceballos 30'; Muricy Ramalho 34', 58', 72'; René Paúl Moreno 64'	Report	Nelson Sanhueza 70' (own)

Estadio Cuauhtémoc, Puebla

Puebla won 6-3 on aggregate.

May 12, 1983

UdeG	2–0	Toluca
Víctor Rodríguez 15'; Jorge Correa 22'	Report

Estadio Jalisco, Guadalajara
May 15, 1983

Toluca	3–2	UdeG
Juan Carlos Paz 48', 80', 83'	Report	Reynaldo Guëldini 26'; Jorge Dávalos 52' (pen.)

Estadio Toluca 70, Toluca

UdeG won 2-4 on aggregate.

=== Semi-finals ===
May 18, 1983

UdeG	1–0	Puebla
Jorge Correa 35'	Report

Estadio Jalisco, Guadalajara
May 22, 1983

Puebla	4–2	UdeG
Muricy Ramalho 45', 69'; Ítalo Estupiñán 49'; René Paúl Moreno 81'	Report	Luis Plascencia 27'; Jorge Dávalos 83' (pen.)

Estadio Cuauhtémoc, Puebla

Puebla won 4-3 on aggregate.

May 19, 1983

Guadalajara	1–2	América
Roberto Gómez Junco 57'	Report	Norberto Outes 11' (pen.); Nilton Pinheiro Batata 53'

Estadio Jalisco, Guadalajara
May 22, 1983

América	0–3	Guadalajara
	Report	Ricardo Pérez 45'; Demetrio Madero 45'; Samuel Rivas 88'

Estadio Azteca, Mexico City

Guadalajara 2-4 on aggregate.

== Final ==
May 26, 1983

Guadalajara	2–1	Puebla
Samuel Rivas 13'; Demetrio Madero 74'	Report

Estadio Jalisco, Guadalajara
May 29, 1983

Puebla	1–0	Guadalajara
Demetrio Madero 44' (own)	Report
Penalties
	7–6

Estadio Cuauhtémoc, Puebla

Aggregate tied. Puebla won 7–6 on penalty shootout.

1982-83 winners

1st title
