= Ricardo La Volpe =

Argentine footballer and manager

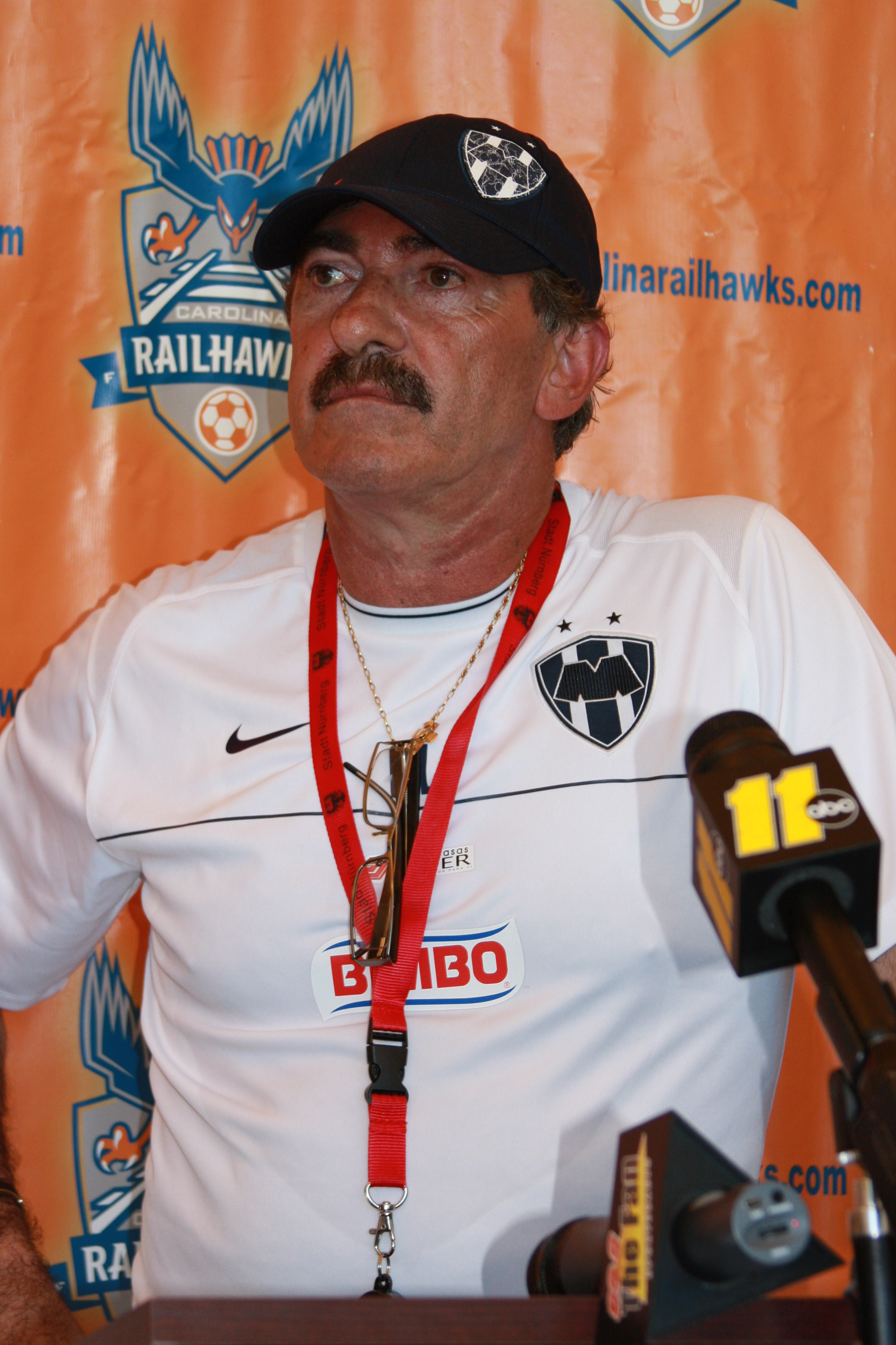
- La Volpe as Monterrey manager in 2008

Personal information
- Full name: Ricardo Antonio La Volpe Guarchoni
- Date of birth: 6 February 1952 (age 74)
- Place of birth: Buenos Aires, Argentina
- Height: 1.88 m (6 ft 2 in)
- Position: Goalkeeper

Senior career*
Years	Team	Apps	(Gls)
1971–1973	Banfield	108	(0)
1975–1979	San Lorenzo	112	(0)
1979–1982	Atlante		
1982–1983	Oaxtepec		

International career
1975–1978	Argentina	8	(0)

Managerial career
- 1983–1984: Oaxtepec
- 1988–1989: Atlante
- 1989: Guadalajara
- 1990–1991: Querétaro
- 1991–1996: Atlante
- 1996: América
- 1997–2001: Atlas
- 2001–2002: Toluca
- 2002–2006: Mexico
- 2006–2007: Boca Juniors
- 2007–2008: Vélez Sársfield
- 2008: Monterrey
- 2009–2010: Atlas
- 2010–2011: Costa Rica
- 2011: Banfield
- 2012–2013: Atlante
- 2014: Guadalajara
- 2015–2016: Chiapas
- 2016–2017: América
- 2018: Pyramids
- 2019: Toluca
- 2024: Muchachos FC (AKL)
Medal record
Men's football
Representing Argentina (as a player)
FIFA World Cup
Winner	1978 Argentina
Representing Mexico (as manager)
CONCACAF Gold Cup
Winner	2003 United States–Mexico
Pan American Games
Bronze medal – third place	2003 Santo Domingo	Team
- * Club domestic league appearances and goals

Ricardo Antonio La Volpe Guarchoni (Spanish pronunciation: [ˈrikaɾðo la ˈβolpe]; born 6 February 1952) is an Argentine former professional footballer and manager. He is a World Cup-winning goalkeeper who played for most of his career in Argentina and Mexico.

As a coach, La Volpe was in charge of both the Mexico and Costa Rica national teams, coaching the former at the 2006 World Cup. As club manager at Atlante, the league title was won in the 1992–93 season.

On 22 April 2020, in an interview with David Faitelson, he announced his retirement from management.

== Playing career ==
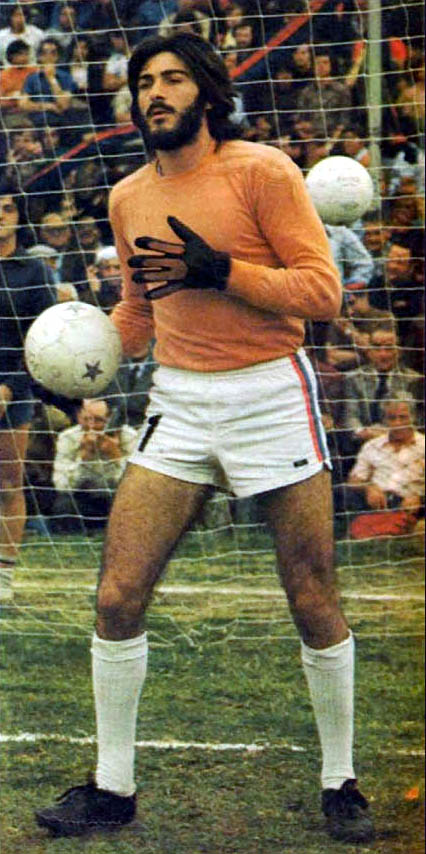
La Volpe with San Lorenzo in 1978

In Argentina, La Volpe played for Banfield and San Lorenzo. In Mexico he played for Atlante and Oaxtepec.

La Volpe made eight appearances with Argentina throughout his career. He was the reserve goalkeeper when they won the 1978 FIFA World Cup with Argentina.

== Managerial career ==
=== Early career ===
Ricardo La Volpe began his career as a coach in the Mexican league in 1989, managing several teams such as Oaxtepec, Puebla, Atlante, Guadalajara, Querétaro, América, Atlas, Toluca, and Monterrey. Despite mixed results, La Volpe earned a reputation for his offensive style of football. He led Atlante to the 1992–1993 season championship and reached the league final with Atlas in 1999.

=== Mexico national team ===
In 2002, La Volpe was named coach of the Mexico national team. He led the team to win the 2003 CONCACAF Gold Cup. He qualified for the 2006 World Cup, as well as finishing in fourth place at the 2005 Confederations Cup, most notably defeating eventual champions Brazil in the group stage. With La Volpe at the helm, Mexico reached fourth place in the FIFA World rankings.

Also, under his leadership at the 2004 Copa América, Mexico managed to defeat Argentina for the first time in years but lost to Brazil in the quarterfinals. Mexico also lost in the 2005 CONCACAF Gold Cup quarterfinals to Colombia. Mexico was also eliminated at the 2004 Olympic Games after losing to South Korea in the group stage.

At the 2006 FIFA World Cup, Mexico finished second in their group, qualifying for the Round of 16 before going out 1–2 in extra time to Argentina. The Guardian named him Best Coach of the World Cup for his attitude.

=== Boca Juniors ===
After leaving the Mexico national team, he met with Boca Juniors officials on 24 July 2006. After several weeks of negotiation, it was agreed on 22 August that La Volpe would take over as Boca manager on 15 September, replacing Alfio Basile, who had been selected to manage the Argentina national team.

La Volpe had a bumpy start with Boca Juniors, including a 3–1 loss against arch-rivals River Plate on 8 October. On 12 October, Boca lost 3–1 to Uruguayan club Nacional on penalty kicks in the Copa Sudamericana, and so were out of the competition. Boca failed three times to claim the Apertura Championship in the final weeks of the season and then lost a playoff against Estudiantes. Keeping his word that he would quit if he lost, La Volpe resigned after the match. Later that year, he became the new Vélez Sársfield manager but did not stay in the job long. After watching his team suffer bruising defeats by River Plate and Boca Juniors in the Apertura 2007, and his team in 10th place, he resigned as coach.

=== Return to Mexico ===
In 2008, Ricardo La Volpe returned to Mexico as Monterrey's manager. After several days of speculation, the club's official website finally announced that it was replacing former manager Isaac Mizrahi. He had a bumpy start and didn't win until his fifth match. Monterrey finished the season in 8th place and had the league's leading goal scorer, Humberto Suazo. Monterrey's league would end in the semi-finals, where they were eliminated by Santos Laguna after an aggregate score of 3–3. Fans of Monterrey spoke highly of La Volpe for helping the team reach the playoffs again after two dismal seasons of not qualifying, including a last-place finish during the last tournament. In the Apertura 2008, the team would have a pretty good start, but ultimately fell apart towards the end of the tournament, placing Monterrey in the bottom of the table, hence not qualifying to the playoffs. After the disappointing tournament, the team did not offer the money La Volpe was looking for, and he decided to leave the team.

=== Return to Atlas ===
On 28 January 2009, La Volpe signed once again with Atlas. Fans of the team had been yearning for him to return to the squad, in which many said he had the most success. The tournament was unsuccessful, with the team failing to qualify for the playoffs and finishing 13th. On 18 November, the Argentine coach quit Atlas due to poor results and was replaced by Carlos Ischia.

=== Costa Rica ===
On 9 September 2010, the former Atlas coach became the new manager of Costa Rica, replacing interim coach Rónald González. The Argentine had initially been signed until July 2014, however, poor performance during the 2011 Gold Cup and 2011 Copa América, ended his contract prematurely on 11 August 2011.

=== Guadalajara ===
La Volpe was named Guadalajara manager after a 4–0 loss against América with just four games to go in the tournament. After a win against Pachuca on his debut, he finished the league with a draw and 2 losses. However, on 30 April 2014, La Volpe was fired by Vergara after a female staff member alleged improper behavior by La Volpe toward her, resulting in a lawsuit.

=== América ===
Following the sacking of Club América's manager Ignacio Ambríz, La Volpe was announced as manager on 22 September 2016. Just two days after becoming manager, they defeated Universidad Nacional, 2–1. He led América towards a strong final stretch at the end of 2016, culminating with a fourth-place finish at the FIFA Club World Cup and finishing runners-up in the Apertura championship match against Tigres UANL.

Although contributing by debuting major prospects such as Diego Lainez and Edson Álvarez, La Volpe and America decided to part ways after a lackluster Clausura 2017 where America failed to qualify to the playoffs for the first time since 2011.

== Reception ==
=== Influence ===
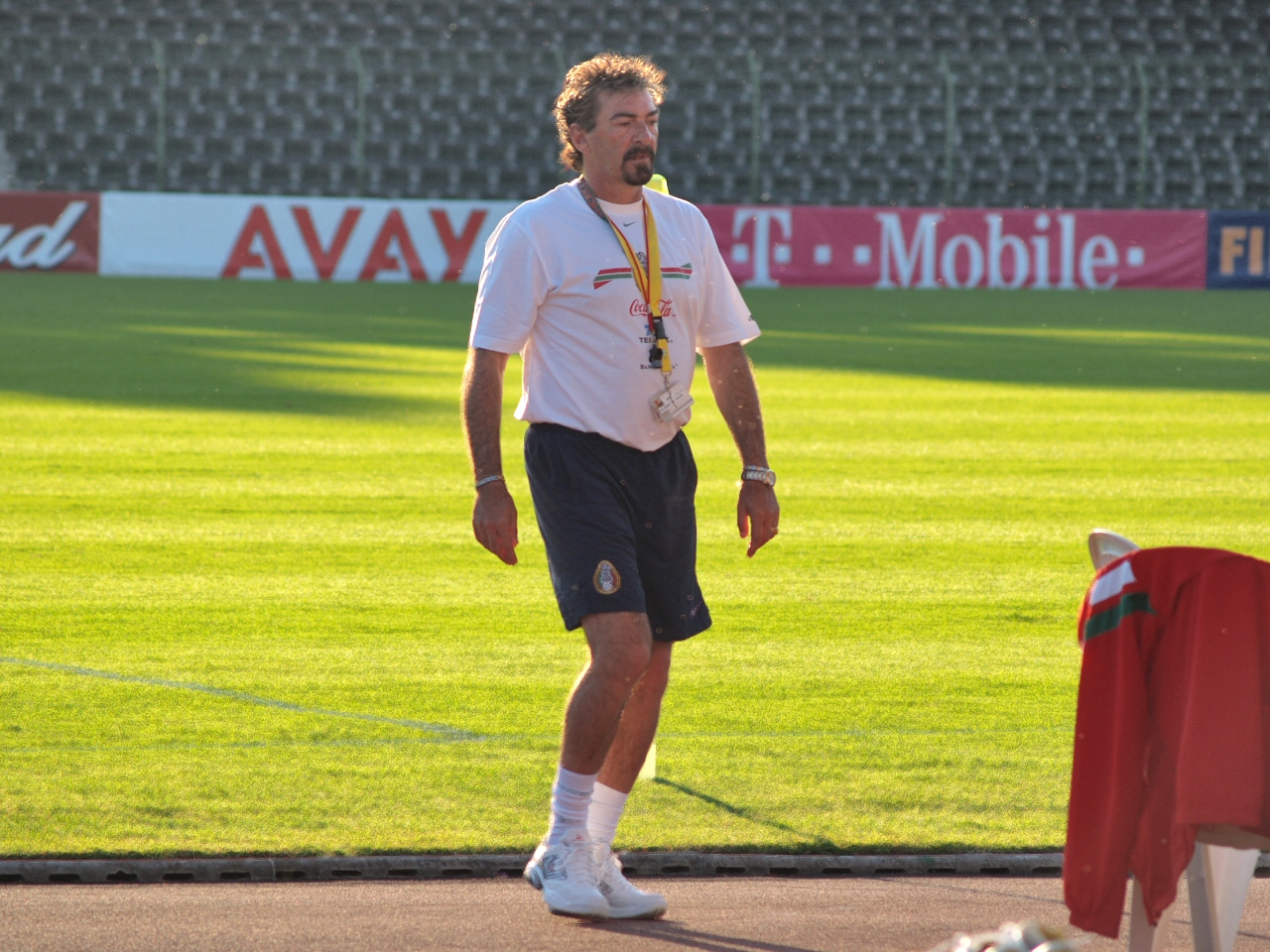
La Volpe as manager for Mexico amidst the 2006 World Cup

La Volpe's philosophy, style of play, and attitude referred to as "Lavolpismo," has played a considerable role in the evolution of tactics and strategy in Mexican league football. Coaches who have studied under and continue to use a modified version of his style of play and philosophy are referred to as "Lavolpistas". Notable managers directly influenced by La Volpe include Miguel Herrera, José Guadalupe Cruz, Rubén Omar Romano, Hernan Cristante, Jose Saturnino Cardozo and Sergio Bueno.

=== Criticism ===
During Mexico's first group-stage match in the 2006 World Cup against Iran, La Volpe was seen chain-smoking in the dugout, leading to an official warning from FIFA that he was not allowed to smoke in the competition area. La Volpe responded by telling FIFA's executives that he would "rather give up football than smoking", although he later consented.

He has also had clashes with the press. During a press conference at the 2006 World Cup, La Volpe told a journalist: "¡Fuera de mi vista! No saben nada. No me rompan los huevos, idiotas." ["Get out of my face! You know nothing. Don't bust my balls, you idiots."]

He has odd superstitions some which include wearing a lucky tie, performing "oriental" rituals and avoiding shaking the opposing manager's hand prior to or after the game.

== Honours ==
=== Player ===
Banfield

- Primera B Metropolitana: 1973

Argentina

- FIFA World Cup: 1978

=== Manager ===
Atlante

- Primera División de México: 1992–93

Mexico

- CONCACAF Gold Cup: 2003

Mexico U23

- CONCACAF Olympic Qualifying Championship: 2004

Individual

- Primera División de México Best Manager: 1992–93
