= Lobos de Tlaxcala =

Lobos Tlaxcala
- Full name: Club Deportivo Lobos de Tlaxcala
- Nickname: Lobos (Wolves)
- Founded: 1973
- Ground: Estadio El gallo Super 7 Tlaxcala, Mexico
- Capacity: 500
- Manager: Víctor Molina Elguea
Home colours	Away colours

Lobos de Tlaxcala is a football team that plays in the Tercera División de México out of group 3. The club was established after the franchise was moved from Oaxaca in 2009.

== History ==
The club was founded in 1973, formed mostly by the young players of the state of Tlaxcala joining the Tercera División de México. They were giving the nickname Lobos (Wolves) and also Escuadrón Verde (Green Brigade) because of their green home jersey. By 1978–79 the club would reach the final and earn a promotion to the Segunda División de México. The club played in the Segunda División de México from 1979–1982 after relegation back to the Tercera División de México. The club would go on hiatus, returning in 2003 under the name Guerreros de Tlaxcala.

In 2009 Alejandro Escudero took over the club, joining an amateur football league liga dominical de futsal under the name PIDE B.In 2011 the club joined the Tercera División de México after winning the liga dominical de futsal in 2008, 2009 and 2010.

== Honors ==
- Tercera División de México (1) 1978–79
- liga dominical de futsal serie A (2):2009, 2010
- dominical de futsal serie B (1:)2008
- torneo de copa :(2) 2009, 2010
