= Club Atlético Valladolid =

Atlético Valladolid
- Full name: Club Atlético Valladolid
- Nickname: Panteras (Panthers)
- Founded: 1959; 67 years ago 2016; 10 years ago (refounded)
- Ground: Complejo Deportivo Bicentenario; Morelia, Michoacán
- Capacity: 1,000
- Owner: Promotora Deportiva Valladolid
- Chairman: José Alfredo Pérez Ferrer
- Manager: Carlos Piña
- League: Liga TDP
Home colours	Away colours

Club Atlético Valladolid is a Mexican football club based in Morelia, Michoacán that currently competes in the Tercera División de México, the bottom division level of Mexican football.

== History ==
The club was founded for the first time in 1959, to compete in the Segunda División de México, taking advantage of the fact that Club Deportivo Morelia had been promoted to the Primera División de México. In 1962, the team stopped competing professionally for the first time.

In 1979, the team returned to take part in the professional leagues by enrolling in the Tercerca División de México. In 1981, Atlético Valldolid bought the place of Club Atletas Industriales de Querétaro, and with that it returned to the Segunda División, taking advantage of the fact that Atlético Morelia was promoted to the Primera División. In 1983, the team suffered several financial problems, so it was relocated to Irapuato, Guanajuato and sold its place to Club Irapuato, and therefore, it was dissolved.

In 2016, the team was revived by an alliance between a local businessman and a group of many former professional footballers, with the aim of turning it into a development team for youth players and seeking a promotion in the future. During its first season, the newly revived team was officially located in Navojoa, Sonora and played as Generales de Navojoa, because the club got the loan from that franchise to be able to compete.

In the 2017–2018 season, the team achieved its official registration as a club, so it was able to compete with that name. However, at the end of that period, the team was relocated to Pátzcuaro, Michoacán, because it did not get the sufficient support of the government and sponsors to allow it to use a stadium in Morelia.

In 2019, the club was relocated to Tuxtla Gutiérrez, Chiapas due to economic debts and financial problems and was officially suspended from the Tercera División. However, after it was suspended from the league, the club was relocated back to Morelia, Michoacán in 2020, and later, the club merged with the Panteras project, creating a new team called Ates Morelia RC, but using the original Atlético Valladolid registry. In 2021, the alliance with Ates Morelia officially ended, and the team returned to compete as Atlético Valladolid, recovering its original owners and entering into an alliance with La Piedad, because both clubs share the same group of owners.

In 2025, Atlético Valladolid merged with Guerreros Zacapu; consequently, the Zacapu team began operating the Valladolid franchise, although it officially competed in the 2025–26 season under the Atlético Valladolid registration.

== Players ==
=== First-team squad ===
As of 25 September 2021

Note: Flags indicate national team as defined under FIFA eligibility rules; some limited exceptions apply. Players may hold more than one non-FIFA nationality.

No.	Pos.	Nation	Player
1	GK	MEX	Yahir Magallón
2	GK	MEX	Rafael Silva
3	DF	MEX	Lamberto Flores
4	DF	MEX	Emmanuel Quiroz
5	MF	MEX	Omar Pérez
6	MF	MEX	José Díaz
7	FW	MEX	Alan Borja
8	MF	MEX	Lenin Ruiz
9	FW	MEX	Rafael Ruiz
10	MF	MEX	Gerson Huante
11	DF	MEX	Erik Vargas
12	FW	MEX	Ángel Lugo
13	MF	MEX	Diego Martínez

No.	Pos.	Nation	Player
14	MF	MEX	Freddy Ruiz
15	MF	MEX	Luis Cardiel
16	MF	MEX	Samuel Castillo
17	MF	MEX	Gerardo Rodríguez
18	MF	MEX	Luis García
19	DF	MEX	Jorge Ybañez
20	MF	MEX	Gustavo Olvera
21	MF	MEX	Jorge Lara
22	MF	MEX	José Espinosa
23	DF	MEX	Gabriel Huante
24	DF	MEX	Alfonso Tenorio
25	DF	MEX	Diego Bocanegra

== See also ==
- Football in Mexico
- Tercera División de México
