= C.F. Cobras de Ciudad Juárez =

Cobras Fútbol Premier
- Full name: Cobras Fútbol Premier
- Nicknames: Las Cobras; Los Ofidios
- Founded: 1983; 43 years ago
- Dissolved: 2005; 21 years ago
- Ground: Estadio 20 de Noviembre; Ciudad Juárez, Chihuahua
- Capacity: 2,200
- Manager: Ricardo Galindo
- League: Segunda División de México
Home colours	Away colours

Cobras Fútbol Premier was a Mexican football team that played in the Segunda División de México. They were held in the border town of Ciudad Juárez, Chihuahua.

== History ==
The club was originally founded in the city of Querétaro, Querétaro under the name Cobras de Querétaro, that was run by Grupo Televisa to carry veteran and the basic forces players of América. In the 1985-86 season, they won promotion by defeating Pachuca 3-1 on aggregate, but only lasted a season in top flight, as in 1987, they fell along with León finishing with 31 points in 40 games.

After descending, Alejandro de la Vega bought the franchise and moved it to Ciudad Juárez, Chihuahua. They immediately had success by making it to the finals in their first season and were crowned champions after defeating León, by a score of 1-0 in a game played in the Estadio Azteca on July 12, 1988, with Joaquín Mendoza as the manager, achieving automatic promotion to the Primera División de México.

The first match played in the maximum circuit was an away game against Cruz Azul in the Copa MX. At home, they debuted in Olímpico Benito Juárez against Correcaminos. In the 1988-89 season, they had their first meeting against América that ended 0-0. At home, they debuted with a 3-0 victory over the Correcaminos. In their first league tournament, they ended at the 12th position overall and 3rd in group 4.

For the 1989-90 season, Uruguayan Carlos Miloc became manager, doing a good job, but surprisingly he was stopped and his assistant Héctor Hugo Eugui took office. Cobras came within 1 point to qualify for the playoffs, because in the last game of the regular season they tied 1-1 with Toluca. They were only 1 point below the Necaxa with 38 units.

In the 1990-91 season, Héctor Hugo Eugui would start as a manager and Argentine Carlos Rodríguez came to replace him. That season's 17th overall was mediocre accomplishment and remained in last place in Group 4.

In the 1991-92 season, Cobras played the Cup tournament, where they were protagonists and reached the final, but Monterrey defeated them by a score of 4-2.

Beginning the regular season, Cobras started regularly but slowly reeled and as a result Cobras fell to the Segunda División de México with a disappointing run of 7 consecutive defeats. Halfway through the season, "Chamaco" Rodríguez was fired and replaced by Joaquín Mendoza, the same coach that would help the team get promoted in the 1987-88 season, but not save the team from relegating again in the 1991-92 season.

Cobras played 3 seasons in the Segunda División de México and in the 1993-94 season, they were near the promotion but were eliminated by Zacatepec in the semifinal round. In 1994, Primera División 'A' de México was born, but due to economic problems, the Cobras franchise disappeared.

In the Invierno 2001 tournament, the Saltillo Soccer franchise was moved to the border town of Ciudad Juárez and Cobras was reborn as a subsidiary and dependent of Monterrey. In command of Sergio Orduna, the team managed to reach the final of the Apertura 2003 with adverse outcome, falling to the Dorados de Sinaloa during this match Ignacio Battle's performance gave the team a 3-0 lead but unfortunately got injured and had to be substituted. The team collapsed and lost the final and the chance to return to the Primera División de México. They continued to play 3 more tournaments in the Primera División 'A' with mediocre results until the end of the Clausura 2005, when the team disappeared again due to high debts and several financial problems, and were replaced by Indios.

== Honours ==
=== National Tournaments ===
- Segunda División (2): 1985-86, 1987–88
- Runner-up Copa MX in 1991
- Runner-up Apertura 2003 Primera Division "A"

== See also ==
- Cobras de Querétaro
