= Estadio Venustiano Carranza =

Sporting venue in Mexico

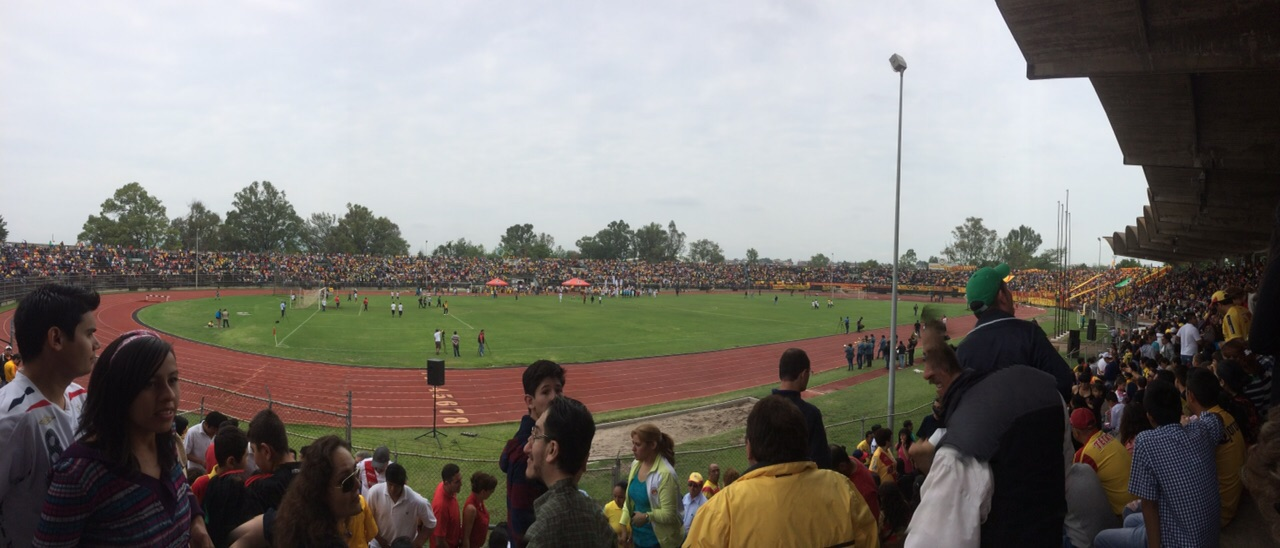
- Interactive map of Estadio Venustiano Carranza
- Full name: Estadio Olimpico Venustiano Carranza
- Location: Morelia, Mexico
- Coordinates: 19.700294°N 101.168075°W
- Owner: Government of Michoacán
- Operator: Government of Michoacán
- Capacity: 17,600

Tenants
- Atlético Morelia (1960–1989); Atlético Valladolid (1960–1962, 1979–1981, 2016–2018); Tigres Blancos Gestalt (2014–2017); 4D Morelia (2019–2020); Purépechas F.C. (2021–2023, 2026–)

Estadio Olimpico Venustiano Carranza is a multi-use stadium in Morelia, Mexico, used mostly for football matches and also for athletics. It was initially used as the stadium of Atlético Morelia matches. It was replaced by Estadio Morelos when Atlético Morelia moved there in 1989. In October 2021, H2O Purépechas F.C., a Liga TDP team, began to play there. The capacity of the stadium is 17,600 spectators.
