= Club Jalisco =

Mexican football club

Gallos Viejos
- Full name: Club Social y Deportivo Jalisco, A.C.
- Nickname(s): Gallos Viejos
- Founded: 1970
- Ground: Club Pumas Tesistán; Zapopan, Jalisco, Mexico
- Capacity: 1,000
- Chairman: Rodolfo García Covarrubias
- Manager: Omar Avilán
- League: Liga TDP - Group XIII
- 2020–21: 16th – Group X
| Home colours | Away colours |

Club Social y Deportivo Jalisco, A.C. is a Mexican football team. The team was founded in 1970, played in the Primera Division Mexicana and Second Division Mexicana and returned in 2015.

== History ==
In 1970 a group of sugar businessmen acquired C.D. Oro and renamed it as Club Jalisco. The team stayed 10 seasons in the First Division from 1970 until 1980. In its trajectory, the team could never reach the championship phase.

In their debut season in 1970-71 they ended second place just 5 points below Toluca, who impeded them to reach the final against América. In 1971-72 season they ended 9 points away from qualifying to the playoffs, and in 1972-73 a 6th place in their group began to reflect a sluggish performance of the players. From the 1973-74 season to 1975-76 season they were unable to pass mid-table and occupied the last positions on several occasions.

For the 1976-77 season they came up short by 7 points from reaching the playoffs. Similarly in the 1977-78 season they were short by 4 points of Tigres UANL who eventually become champions. In 1978-79 and 1979–80, their last two seasons, they ranked last in their group.

The 1979–80 campaign made them have to contest a relegation playoffs with the Unión de Curtidores. They lost by an aggregate score of 4-3 and the team was relegated to Segunda Division Mexicana.

For the 1983-84 season, Jalisco reached the final of the second division, finally defeated by the Zacatepec with an aggregate of 3–1. Being the last time in which the club has been close to being promoted to the highest category of Mexican football.

In 1991 Club Jalisco sold its franchise, the new owners relocated the team to Acapulco and renamed it as Delfines de Acapulco.

In 2008, the team reappeared with the original name in order to participate in Liga de Talentos de la Segunda División.

In 2015, two different groups created two new teams trying to revive the history of the Club Jalisco. On the one hand, a team from the city of El Salto changed its name unofficially to Jalisco. On the other hand, former club players founded another team called Gallos Viejos, which continues to play in the Third Division.

In June 2019, Club Jalisco signed an agreement with Deportivo CAFESSA, through this document a new club called Deportivo CAFESSA Jalisco was established, which represented the return of Club Jalisco to football, since the other teams had only taken up the name of the team without having a direct relationship with the directive. After that, the new team began playing in the Liga Premier de México – Serie A and won the right to use the Estadio Jalisco as their home venue.

== Honors ==
- Runner up Segunda División de México 1984

== Stadium ==
Club Social y Deportivo Jalisco played in Estadio Jalisco, which belongs to the civil Clubs States of Jalisco with 25% of the shares, which were inherited with the purchase of the Oro, act that made them legal partner and part owner of the Estadio Jalisco.

== See also ==
- Primera División de México
- Jalisco Stadium
