= Deportivo Neza =

Coyotes Neza
- Full name: Club Deportivo Coyotes Neza, A.C.
- Nickname: Coyotes
- Founded: 1978
- Ground: Deportivo Eduardo Molina; Ciudad Nezahualcóyotl, State of Mexico, Mexico
- Capacity: 1,000
- Manager: Miguel Ángel Limón
- League: Tercera División de México
Home colours	Away colours

Deportivo Neza, also known as Coyotes, was a Mexican football team. The club was founded in 1978 when the city of Nezahualcóyotl, State of Mexico, bought the Club de Fútbol Laguna franchise and relocated it to the city. The club has played in various leagues in Mexico. The club played from 1978 to 1988 in the Primera División de México before the club was sold and moved to Ciudad Victoria, Tamaulipas and renamed Correcaminos UAT. The club has recently made its comeback in the Tercera División de México.

== History ==
Deportivo Neza was founded in 1978 when the city of Ciudad Nezahualcóyotl, State of Mexico bought the Club de Fútbol Laguna franchise from Torreón, Coahuila and relocated it to the city. The owners decided to change the club's colors to yellow and black from their original green and white. The club originally played in the city of Texcoco, State of Mexico, where they had their best tournaments.

The club played its first game on September 17, 1978, against América match which they won 1-0 played in the stadium "10 de Diciembre". The first goal was scored by Rito Sotelo in the 89th minute. The club had a terrible first year, finishing last with a record of 4-19-15 with 16 goals score and 35 goals allowed in 38 games for a total of 30 points. The club just managed to keep the category finishing a few points away from the relegated Veracruz.

In the 1979–80 season the club had its first qualification tournament finishing second in its group 6th overall with a record of 12-20-6 with 53 goals scored and 38 goals allowed in 38 games finishing with 44 points. In the first round the club played a short tournament in group 2 with clubs Cruz Azul, Atlante F.C. and Jaibos Tampico Madero the club played 6 matches, winning 2, tying 2, and losing 2, finished tied for 2nd place with Atlante F.C. failing to advance to the final.

In the 1980–81 season the club once again qualified to the Championship Playoff after finishing second once again in group 2 and 7 overall with a record of 13-15-10 scoring 42 goals and allowing 39 finish with 41 points. In the championship playoff series they were placed with C.D. Guadalajara, Atlético Español and Club Universidad Nacional. The club finished with 2 wins, 2 draws, and 2 losses, for a total of 6 points, 3 behind Club Universidad Nacional who eventually took the title, failing once again to reach the final.

The club played its last tournament in the Primera División de México in the 1987–88 season tournament. The club was placed in group 3 along with clubs América, Puebla F.C. and Deportivo Irapuato and Necaxa. The club finished 4th with a record of 12-11-15 scoring 46 goals and allowing 60 with a total of 35 points 3 behind Puebla F.C. who obtain the last playoff spot. At the end of the season with financial problems and lack of fan support the club was sold and transferred to Ciudad Victoria, Tamaulipas and remained Correcaminos UAT a local university.

In the 1990s, the city tried to bring back the club but fail in its attempt and so a new club was formed Toros Neza which played in the same stadium as Coyotes had played. Toros played in the Segunda División de México in 1993 and ended winning that championship earning a chance to play in the Primera División where they played from 1993 to 2002. Recently, the club has made its return playing in the Tercera División de México trying to once again be part of the 18 clubs in the Liga MX.

== Historic badges ==
=== Historic badges ===
1970S

1980S

== Primera División de México Statistics ==
All statistics from the club's play in the Primera División de México from 1978 to 1989.

GP	W	D	L	G F	GS	Pts	DIF
370	111	137	122	459	475	359	-16

- GP - Games Played
- W - WINS
- E - Draws
- P - Loss
- GS - Goals Score
- GA - Goals Allowed
- Pts - Points
- DIF - Difference

== Past Kits ==
First kit evolution

1979	1980	1981	1982

=== See also ===
- Club de Fútbol Laguna
- Correcaminos UAT
- Tercera División de México
- Primera División de México
- Toros Neza
