= Estadio Colima =

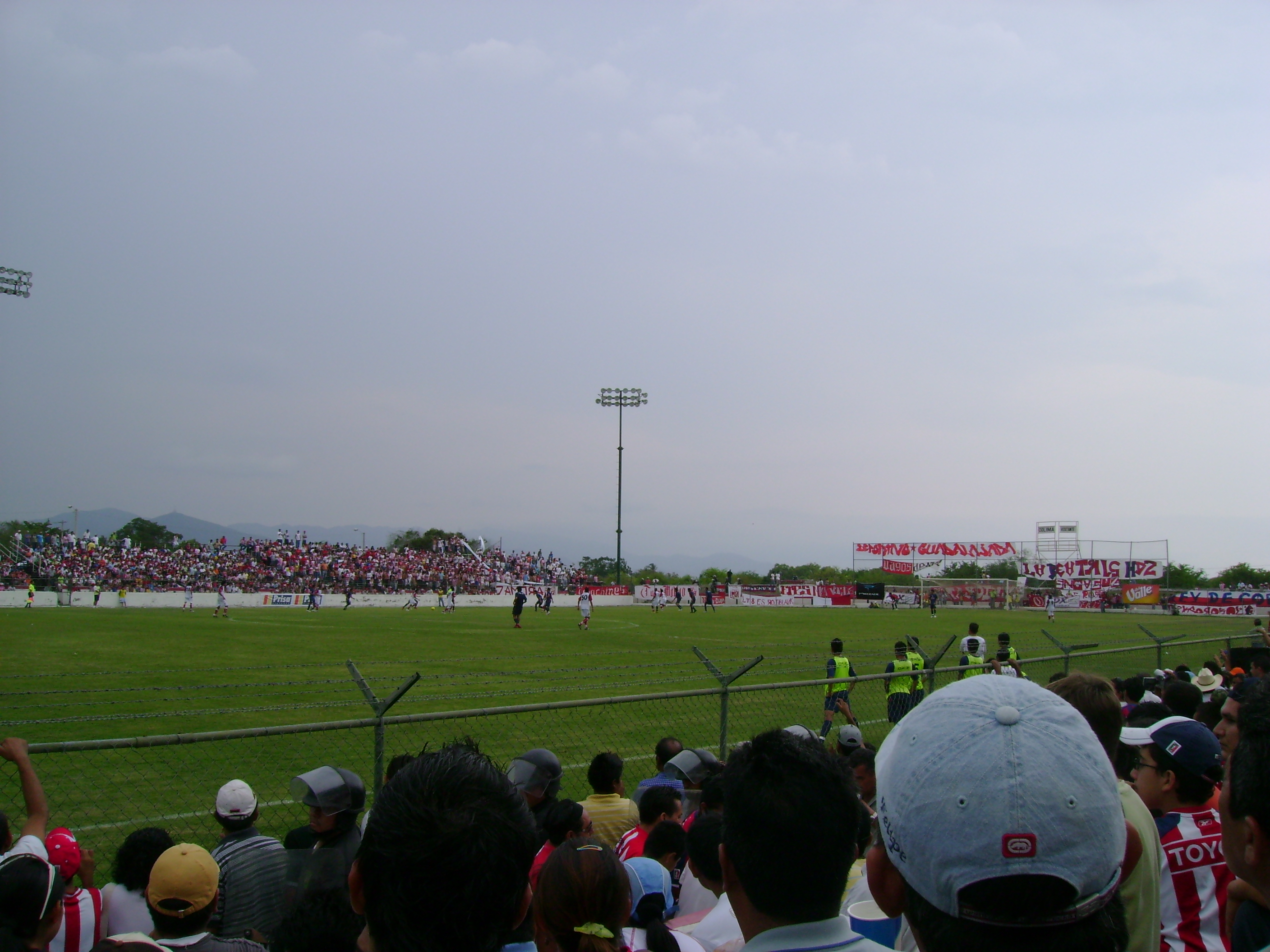
- Interactive map of Estadio Colima
- Full name: Estadio Colima
- Location: Colima City, Mexico
- Coordinates: 19°13′55″N 103°44′15″W
- Owner: Government of Colima
- Operator: Government of Colima
- Capacity: 12,000
- Surface: Grass

Construction
- Opened: 1976

Tenants
- Jaguares de Colima (1976–86, 1997–2000); Loros UdeC (1986–87); Huracanes de Colima (2004–05); Real de Colima (2006–09); Palmeros de Colima (2014–18); Colima F.C. (2023–current)

The Estadio Colima is a multi-use stadium in Colima City. It is currently used mostly for football matches and is the home stadium for Palmeros. The stadium has a capacity of 12,000 people.
