= Unión de Curtidores =

- Full name: Club Unión De Curtidores
- Nicknames: Curtidores; Cuereros; La Franja; Garra Curtidora; El Unión
- Founded: 15 August 1928; 97 years ago
- Ground: Instituto Oviedo Náutico; León, Guanajuato
- Capacity: 1,000
Home colours	Away colours

Unión de Curtidores (Spanish, Union of Tanners; nicknamed Curtidores) is a retired Mexican football club. The club was founded on August 15, 1928 and is based in León, Guanajuato.

== History ==
The club was founded on August 15, 1928 in León, Guanajuato. The club gained fame in the early 1930s by defeating local clubs in such a way that the board of directors tried to enroll the club in the Primera División de México. It was not until 1943 when the club and the club's state of Guanajuato joined forces and created Unión-León, which later become León. The club went on to keep the club's name and the colors and in 1967 joined the Segunda División de México. In the 1970-71 tournament, the club finished in 7th place overall. In the 1971-72 tournament, the club finished one point away from being relegated.

In the 1972-73 tournament, the club finished in 8th place overall. In the 1974-75 tournament, they managed to qualify for the playoffs beating León 1-0, but fell to Toluca, who went on to become the champion that year.

In the 1977–78 and 1979–80 tournaments, the team was on the verge of being relegated to the Segunda División, however, it defeated Atlas and Club Jalisco to ensure its continuity in the first division level of Mexican soccer. However, in 1981 Curtidores was relegated to the second level after losing the relegation promotion to Atlas. In the 1982–83 tournament, the team managed to return to the top category after defeating Deportivo Zamora in the promotion play–off. The team only remained in the Primera División for one season, in the 1984–85 tournament, since Curtidores was directly relegated to the second level for being more than 11 points away from the penultimate classified team. After this relegation, the team has never returned to the Primera División.

During 1986 and 1987, the Unión de Curtidores board ended its professional football teams, selling its franchises to teams from the cities of Chetumal, Quintana Roo and Zacatecas, Zacatecas.

In 1997, Unión de Curtidores returned to Mexican professional football when it was registered in the Primera División 'A' de México (second division level), the club was registered as an affiliated team to León, the city's main team and its former historical rival.

In 1999, Curtidores had achieved promotion to the Primera División after defeating Venados de Yucatán in the promotion final. However, its owner decided to sell the team's franchise to Puebla and relocate it to the city of Puebla, Puebla, a team that had been relegated from the top tier in the same season, since the owner did not want to keep two teams in the same division, in addition to seeking the continuity of Club León, the which was considered his main team, so Curtidores did not manage to promote and abandoned professional football after that decision.

During the decades of 2000 and 2010, Unión de Curtidores had a presence in the Segunda and Tercera División de México, with representative teams that appeared and disappeared constantly. In the Clausura 2013 and Clausura 2014 tournaments, Curtidores managed to reach the final of the Liga Premier de Ascenso, being defeated by Ballenas Galeana Morelos and Atlético Coatzacoalcos, respectively. During those years the team was part of the Grupo Pachuca sports structure and functioned as a development team for Club León. In the summer of 2014, the team was sold to Chiapas F.C., who relocated it to Tuxtla Gutiérrez, Chiapas to re-found Atlético Chiapas, ending professional football again for Unión de Curtidores.

Ten years after its last disappearance, in July 2024 the team tried to return to professional football with the help of Club Cachorros de León, even the team's management announced its return to the fields. However, finally the Segunda División de México did not authorize the move, so Curtidores attempt to return to professional activity was frustrated.

== Honours ==
- Liga de Ascenso de México: 1

1999

- Segunda División de México: 1

1982-1983

- Copa México de Segunda División de México: 1

1971

== Reserves ==
=== Búfalos Curtidores ===
The team participated in the Tercera División de México, finishing as champions in the 1984–85 season.

== Kit evolution ==
First kit evolution

== See also ==
- Football in Mexico
