= Titanes de Tulancingo =

Mexican football club

- Full name: Titanes de Tulancingo
- Nickname(s): Titanes, Tulancingo
- Founded: 2010; 15 years ago
- Dissolved: 2012; 13 years ago
- Ground: Primero de Mayo; Tulancingo de Bravo, Mexico
- Capacity: 2,500
- League: Segunda Division de Mexico

Titanes de Tulancingo was an association football club in the Mexican Football League Second Division in Tulancingo, Hidalgo, Mexico.

== Honors ==
Ascenso MX:

Apertura 2011, Clausura 2012
