= C.F. Oaxtepec =

Mexican football club

Club de Fútbol Oaxtepec
- Full name: Club de Fútbol Oaxtepec
- Nicknames: Halcones; Verdes
- Founded: 1979
- Ground: Estadio Unidad Deportiva del IMSS, Oaxtepec, Morelos, Mexico
- Capacity: 9,000
- Manager: (Mexico) Héctor Vidal
- League: Liga TDP
Home colours	Away colours

C.F. Oaxtepec is a Mexican football club based in Oaxtepec, Morelos, and currently playing in the Tercera División de México. The club originally played the Primera División de México in the late 1970s and early 1980s before being moved to the city of Puebla, Puebla, and renamed Ángeles de Puebla, and subsequently being moved to Torreón, Coahuila, and renamed Santos Laguna. In 2022, the team returned to participate in Mexican soccer league, currently as Club Deportivo Oaxtepec.

== History ==
The club was formed in 1979 under the name of Club de Fútbol Oaxtepec-IMSS being that at that time Instituto Mexicano del Seguro Social were the owners.

The club began to play in the Tercera División de México in the 1979–1980 season reaching the finals where they faced Águilas de la UPAEP beating them and crowning themselves champions, thus earning the promotion to the Segunda División de México.

The club played 2 years in the Segunda División. In the first 1980–1981 season, the club did not fare so well, it was in their second year 1981–1982 when the club won the championship and the promotion to the Primera División de México after defeating Club Tepic, managed by Edelmiro Arnauda.

The club played its first professional game on September 3, 1982 in the Estadio Azteca against Club América which they lost 2–0. Starting Goalkeeper Ricardo La Volpe who had played for a number of Argentine and Mexican players retired that year. The club finished 4th in Group 3 with 32 points in 38 games played.

In the 1983–1984 season, now retired goalkeeper Ricardo La Volpe took over as head coach and let the club to a 4th-place finish in Group 4 with 33 points gained in 38 games. This marked the last year for the club which was sold and moved to the city of Puebla, Puebla, becoming Ángeles de Puebla. In a strange situation, the club started the 1984–85 season as Oaxtepec, but after the first match the time was sold to the Government of Puebla and rebranded as Ángeles de Puebla for round 2 of the season.

This club played from 1984 to 1989 in Puebla later to be sold and moved to Torreón, Coahuila in 1989. It is currently known as Santos Laguna.

In 2022, the team returned to participate in Mexican soccer after its owners bought the Pejelagartos de Tabasco franchise that participated in the Tercera División de México and moved it to Morelos, so Oaxtepec took its place in that division. However, the team had begun to play in 2021 in amateur leagues.

== Primera División de México statistics ==
GP	W	D	L	G F	GS	Pts	DIF
76	24	17	35	100	125	65	−25

- GP – Games Played
- W – Wins
- D – Draws
- L – Loss
- GS – Goals Scored
- GA – Goals Allowed
- Pts – Points
- DIF – Difference

== Honors ==
=== Torneos nacionales ===
- Segunda División Profesional: 1

1981-82

- Mexican Third Division: 1

1979-80

- Edelmiro Arnauda "Picao" Coached the club from 1979 to 1983 winning championships in both the Segunda División Profesional and Mexican Third Division as well as the promotions.
- Ricardo La Volpe was the last to coach the club had in the First Division.
