= 2015–16 Liga de Nuevos Talentos season =

Liga de Nuevos Talentos
- Season: 2015–16
- Dates: 14 August 2015 – 7 May 2016
- Champions: Apertura: Correcaminos "B"; Clausura; Real Zamora
- Promoted: Uruapan; Sporting Canamy
- Relegated: Llaneros de Guadalupe
- Top goalscorer: Apertura: Santiago López Mar (15 goals); Clausura; Julián Duarte (13 goals)
- Biggest home win: Apertura: Necaxa "B" 7–1 Calor (15 August 2015); Clausura; Real Zamora 9–0 Llaneros (12 March 2016)
- Biggest away win: Apertura: Zorros UMSNH 1–6 FC Satélites (23 August 2015); Clausura; Llaneros 0–9 Académicos (31 January 2016)
- Highest scoring: Apertura: Uruapan (29 points); Clausura; Real Zamora (29 points)
- Stats are from the regular season only

The 2015–16 Liga de Nuevos Talentos season was split in two tournaments Apertura and Clausura. Liga de Nuevos Talentos was the fourth–tier football league of Mexico. The season was played between 14 August 2015 and 7 May 2016.

== Torneo Apertura ==
=== Changes from the previous season ===
26 teams participated in this tournament.

- Mineros de Fresnillo, 2014–15 season champion, remained in this division because the team did not meet the requirements to be promoted to the Liga Premier de Ascenso.
- C.D. Uruapan and Sporting Canamy were promoted from Tercera División. Uruapan played Liga de Nuevos Talentos because the team did not meet the requirements to be promoted to the Liga Premier de Ascenso.
- Topos de Reynosa moved to Chetumal and changed name to Tigrillos de Chetumal.
- Due to the creation of reserve teams in Liga Premier de Ascenso, América Coapa, Chivas Rayadas, Pumas Naucalpan, Alto Rendimiento Tuzo and Cachorros UANL disappeared.
- Alebrijes de Oaxaca "B" moved to Malinalco and changed its name to Colibríes de Malinalco.
- New teams: Llaneros de Guadalupe, Tecomán F.C., FC Satélites and Deportivo Gladiadores.
- Cañoneros de Campeche, Centro Universitario del Fútbol and Zitácuaro disappeared.

=== Stadiums and Locations ===
==== Group 1 ====
Location of teams in the 2015–16 LNT Group 1

Club	City	Stadium	Capacity
Académicos	Zapopan, Jalisco	Alfredo "Pistache" Torres	3,000
Atlético San Luis "B"	San Luis Potosí, S.L.P.	Antonio R. Márquez	1,000
Calor	Gómez Palacio, Durango	Unidad Deportiva Francisco Gómez Palacio	4,000
Correcaminos "B"	Ciudad Victoria, Tamaulipas	Eugenio Alvizo Porras	5,000
Deportivo San Juan	San Juan de los Lagos, Jalisco	San Andrés	2,500
La Piedad	La Piedad, Michoacán	Juan N. López	13,500
Llaneros de Guadalupe	Guadalupe Victoria, Durango	Municipal Guadalupe Victoria	3,000
Mineros de Fresnillo	Fresnillo, Zacatecas	Unidad Deportiva Minera Fresnillo	6,000
Necaxa "B"	Aguascalientes, Aguascalientes	Casa Club Necaxa	1,000
Real Zamora	Zamora, Michoacán	Unidad Deportiva El Chamizal	5,000
Sahuayo	Sahuayo, Michoacán	Unidad Deportiva Municipal	1,500
Tecomán	Tecomán, Colima	Víctor Sevilla Torres	3,000
Uruapan	Uruapan, Michoacán	Unidad Deportiva Hermanos López Rayón	5,000

==== Group 2 ====
Location of teams in the 2015–16 LNT Group 2
Location of teams in the 2015–16 LNT Group 2 (Greater Mexico City)

Club	City	Stadium	Capacity
Celaya "B"	Celaya, Guanajuato	Miguel Alemán Valdés	23,182
Colibríes de Malinalco	Malinalco, State of Mexico	La Loma	3,500
Cuautla	Cuautla, Morelos	Isidro Gil Tapia	5,000
Deportivo Chimalhuacán	Chimalhuacán, State of Mexico	Tepalcates	5,000
Deportivo Gladiadores	Cuautitlán, State of Mexico	Los Pinos	5,000
FC Satélites	Tulancingo, Hidalgo	Primero de Mayo	2,500
Garzas UAEH	Pachuca, Hidalgo	Revolución Mexicana	3,500
Lobos Prepa	Puebla City, Puebla	Universitario BUAP	19,283
Patriotas de Córdoba	Córdoba, Veracruz	Universidad Cristóbal Colón	1,000
Selva Cañera	Zacatepec, Morelos	Mariano Matamoros	16,000
Sporting Canamy	Xochimilco, Mexico City	Momoxco	3,500
Tigrillos de Chetumal	Chetumal, Quintana Roo	10 de Abril	5,000
Zorros UMSNH	Morelia, Michoacán	Venustiano Carranza	17,600

=== Regular season ===
==== Group 1 ====
===== Standings =====
Pos	Team	Pld	W	D	L	GF	GA	GD	Pts	Qualification
1	Uruapan	12	8	2	2	20	14	+6	29	
2	Real Zamora	12	7	3	2	26	11	+15	26	Advance to Liguilla
3	Correcaminos "B"	12	6	3	3	21	15	+6	26	Advance to Liguilla
4	Mineros de Frensillo	12	5	6	1	17	7	+10	23	
5	Académicos	12	6	3	3	18	13	+5	22	
6	Atlético San Luis "B"	12	5	4	3	23	14	+9	20	
7	Sahuayo	12	5	5	2	20	14	+6	20	
8	Necaxa "B"	12	4	4	4	23	17	+6	16	
9	La Piedad	12	4	2	6	14	17	−3	14	
10	Deportivo San Juan	12	3	0	9	12	23	−11	9	
11	Tecomán	11	2	3	6	10	21	−11	9	
12	Llaneros de Guadalupe	11	2	1	8	14	29	−15	8	
13	Calor	12	1	2	9	13	36	−23	6	

Last updated on November 8, 2015.
Source: SoccerWay

===== Results =====
Home \ Away	ACD	ASL	CAL	COR	DSJ	LAP	LGV	MFR	NEC	RZA	SAH	TCM	URP
Académicos de Atlas			2–1		2–0	2–1	1–0				4–1	0–0	
Atlético San Luis	1–0		6–2				5–1				1–1	3–1	
Calor				0–1	1–2		1–3	1–1			2–2	3–2	
Correcaminos	3–1	1–1						1–3	2–2	1–2			0–2
Dep. San Juan		1–4		0–2				1–2	3–4	0–1			0–2
La Piedad		2–0	2–1	2–4	0–1		2–1				1–2	3–0	
Llaneros GV				2–2	1–2			0–4	1–0	2–4			3–4
Mineros Fresnillo	0–0	0–0				3–0			1–0	1–1			0–1
Necaxa	2–3	2–0	7–1			1–1					1–1	3–1	
Real Zamora	2–1	1–1	5–0			2–0			1–1			1–2	
Sahuayo				0–1	2–1		4–0	1–1		2–1			3–0
Tecomán				0–3	2–1		–	1–1			1–1		0–2
Uruapan	2–2	2–1	3–0			0–0			2–0	0–5			

Updated to match(es) played on 8 November 2015. Source: SoccerWay
Legend: Blue = home team win; Yellow = draw; Red = away team win.

==== Group 2 ====
===== Standings =====
Pos	Team	Pld	W	D	L	GF	GA	GD	Pts	Qualification
1	FC Satélites	12	7	2	3	30	13	+17	28	Advance to Liguilla
2	Cuautla	12	8	2	2	24	14	+10	26	Advance to Liguilla
3	Deportivo Gladiadores	12	6	3	3	23	19	+4	24	Advance to Liguilla
4	Sporting Canamy	12	5	6	1	16	11	+5	22	Advance to Liguilla
5	Lobos Prepa	12	5	5	2	19	11	+8	21	
6	Chetumal	12	6	1	5	22	17	+5	21	Advance to Liguilla
7	Deportivo Chimalhuacán	12	5	4	3	14	12	+2	21	Advance to Liguilla
8	Colibríes de Malinalco	12	5	2	5	28	19	+9	19	
9	Selva Cañera	12	5	2	5	21	18	+3	18	
10	Patriotas de Córdoba	12	4	4	4	18	17	+1	18	
11	Celaya "B"	12	1	4	7	9	22	−13	9	
12	Zorros UMSNH	12	1	2	9	12	42	−30	6	
13	Garzas UAEH	12	0	3	9	7	30	−23	3	

Last updated on November 8, 2015.
Source: SoccerWay

===== Results =====
Home \ Away	CEL	CHE	CLB	CUA	DCH	DGL	FCS	GUH	LOB	PCD	SEL	SPC	ZUM
Celaya				0–3		0–2			0–0		0–1		2–4
Chetumal	1–0			2–1		4–0	0–2				1–0		
Colibríes	4–0	4–2			0–1		1–3				3–3	0–1	
Cuautla			2–1			1–0		4–0	2–1	3–2		3–2	1–1
Dep. Chimalhuacán	2–2	1–0		1–1			1–1				3–2		
Dep. Gladiadores			3–2		1–0			2–0	3–3	2–2			5–2
FC Satélites	2–2			4–1		3–0			1–2		2–3		
Garzas UAEH	1–2	1–3	1–6		0–2		0–2				1–1	0–0	
Lobos Prepa		2–0	1–2		0–0			3–0		2–0			4–0
Patriotas	1–0	3–2	1–1		4–0		0–3					1–1	
Selva Cañera				2–0		0–3		4–2	1–1	2–0		0–1	5–0
Sporting Canamy	1–1	2–2			1–0	2–2	2–1		0–0				3–1
Zorros UMSNH		1–5	1–4		0–3		1–6	1–1		0–3			

Updated to match(es) played on 8 November 2015. Source: SoccerWay
Legend: Blue = home team win; Yellow = draw; Red = away team win.

=== Regular-season statistics ===
==== Top goalscorers ====
Players sorted first by goals scored, then by last name.

Rank	Player	Club	Goals
1	(Mexico) Santiago López Mar	Deportivo Gladiadores	15
2	(Mexico) Edgar Quintana	Colibríes de Malinalco	12
2	(Mexico) Ricardo Zendejas	FC Satélites	12
4	(Mexico) Oscar Ramos Reynaga	Real Zamora	10
5	(Mexico) Oscar Saavedra	Sahuayo F.C.	8
5	(Mexico) David Martínez Larriva	Chetumal	8

Source: Liga Premier

=== Liguilla ===
The four best teams of each group play two games against each other on a home-and-away basis. The higher seeded teams play on their home field during the second leg. The winner of each match up is determined by aggregate score. In the quarterfinals and semifinals, if the two teams are tied on aggregate the higher seeded team advances. In the final, if the two teams are tied after both legs, the match goes to extra time and, if necessary, a penalty shoot-out.

Quarter-finals
2	Real Zamora	1	2	3
7	Chetumal	0	0	0
3	Cuautla (tp)	0	1	1
6	Sporting Canamy	1	0	1
1	FC Satélites	1	2	3
8	Dep. Chimalhuacán	0	0	0
4	Correcaminos "B"	2	3	5
5	Deportivo Gladiadores	2	0	2

Semi-finals
2	Real Zamora (tp)	0	2	2
3	Cuautla	2	0	2
1	FC Satélites	0	2	2
4	Correcaminos "B"	1	3	4

Final
2	Real Zamora	0	0	0
4	Correcaminos "B"	1	0	1

(tp) The team won the series by having a better position in the general table

==== Quarter-finals ====
The first legs was played on 14 and 15 November, and the second legs was played on 20, 21 and 22 November 2015.

Team 1	Agg.	Team 2	1st leg	2nd leg
Real Zamora	3–0	Chetumal	1–0	2–0
Cuautla	1–1	Sporting Canamy	0–1	1–0
FC Satélites	3–0	Deportivo Chimalhuacán	1–0	2–0
Correcaminos "B"	5–2	Deportivo Gladiadores	2–2	3–0

===== First leg =====
14 November 2015	Sporting Canamy	1–0	Cuautla	Milpa Alta, Mexico City
15:00	Figueroa 2'	Report		Stadium: Estadio Momoxco; Attendance: 400

14 November 2015	Chetumal	0–1	Real Zamora	Chetumal, Quintana Roo
16:00		Report	Ramos 48'	Stadium: Estadio 10 de Abril; Attendance: 350

14 November 2015	Deportivo Chimalhuacán	0–1	FC Satélites	Chimalhuacán, State of Mexico
16:00		Report	Mejía 68'	Stadium: Estadio Tepalcates; Attendance: 250

15 November 2015	Deportivo Gladiadores	2–2	Correcaminos "B"	Cuautitlán, State of Mexico
16:00	Merlo 25'; López 29'	Report	Reyes 51'; Franco 89'	Stadium: Estadio Los Pinos; Attendance: 500

===== Second leg =====
20 November 2015	Correcaminos "B"	3–0 (5–2 agg.)	Deportivo Gladiadores	Ciudad Victoria, Tamaulipas
20:00	Reyes 5', 13'; Franco 79'	Report		Stadium: Estadio Marte R. Gómez; Attendance: 1,000

21 November 2015	Real Zamora	2–0 (3–0 agg.)	Chetumal	Zamora, Michoacán
20:00	Ramos 35'; Reyes 79'	Report		Stadium: Unidad Deportiva El Chamizal; Attendance: 800

22 November 2015	FC Satélites	2–0 (3–0 agg.)	Deportivo Chimalhuacán	Tulancingo, Hidalgo
12:00	Zendejas 50'; Urbano 79'	Report		Stadium: Estadio Primero de Mayo; Attendance: 1,200

22 November 2015	Cuautla	1–0 (1–1 agg.)	Sporting Canamy	Cuautla, Morelos
16:00	Cortéz 75'	Report		Stadium: Estadio Isidro Gil Tapia; Attendance: 1,500

==== Semi-finals ====
The first legs was played on 25 and 26 November, and the second legs was played on 28 and 29 November 2015.

Team 1	Agg.	Team 2	1st leg	2nd leg
Real Zamora	2–2	Cuautla	0–2	2–0
FC Satélites	2–4	Correcaminos "B"	0–1	2–3

===== First leg =====
25 November 2015	Cuautla	2–0	Real Zamora	Cuautla, Morelos
15:00	Aragón 35'; Negrete 43' (o.g.)	Report		Stadium: Estadio Isidro Gil Tapia; Attendance: 2,000

26 November 2015	Correcaminos "B"	1–0	FC Satélites	Ciudad Victoria, Tamaulipas
20:00	Jiménez 2'	Report		Stadium: Estadio Marte R. Gómez; Attendance: 2,000

===== Second leg =====
28 November 2015	Real Zamora	2–0 (2–2 agg.)	Cuautla	Zamora, Michoacán
20:00	Ramos 76'; Rodríguez 87'	Report		Stadium: Unidad Deportiva El Chamizal; Attendance: 2,000

29 November 2015	FC Satélites	2–3 (2–4 agg.)	Correcaminos "B"	Tulancingo, Hidalgo
12:00	Mejía 24'; Zendejas 56'	Report	Reyes 43'; Fernández 90'; Jiménez 90'	Stadium: Estadio Primero de Mayo; Attendance: 600

==== Final ====
The first leg was played on 3 December, and the second leg was played on 6 December 2015.

Team 1	Agg.	Team 2	1st leg	2nd leg
Real Zamora	0–1	Correcaminos "B"	0–1	0–0

===== First leg =====
3 December 2015	Correcaminos "B"	1–0	Real Zamora	Ciudad Victoria, Tamaulipas
20:00	Franco 8'	Report		Stadium: Estadio Marte R. Gómez; Attendance: 3,000

===== Second leg =====
6 December 2015	Real Zamora	0–0 (0–1 agg.)	Correcaminos "B"	Zamora, Michoacán
16:00		Report		Stadium: Unidad Deportiva El Chamizal; Attendance: 3,000

Apertura 2015 winners

2nd title

== Torneo Clausura ==
=== Regular season ===
==== Group 1 ====
===== Standings =====
Pos	Team	Pld	W	D	L	GF	GA	GD	Pts	Qualification
1	Real Zamora	12	8	3	1	28	9	+19	29	Advance to Liguilla
2	Sahuayo	12	7	3	2	27	14	+13	25	Advance to Liguilla
3	Académicos	12	5	5	2	29	15	+14	23	
4	Atlético San Luis "B"	12	6	2	4	32	24	+8	22	Advance to Liguilla
5	Mineros de Fresnillo	12	7	0	5	32	24	+8	22	
6	Necaxa "B"	12	6	3	3	23	18	+5	22	
7	Uruapan	12	4	6	2	23	12	+11	20	
8	La Piedad	12	4	4	4	20	21	−1	18	Advance to Liguilla
9	Correcaminos "B"	12	4	3	5	28	28	0	16	
10	Calor	12	4	2	6	21	23	−2	16	
11	Tecomán	12	3	1	8	13	25	−12	12	
12	Deportivo San Juan	12	2	3	7	6	23	−17	9	
13	Llaneros de Guadalupe	12	0	1	11	7	56	−49	1	

Last updated on April 3, 2016.
Source: SoccerWay

===== Results =====
Home \ Away	ACD	ASL	CAL	COR	DSJ	LAP	LGV	MFR	NEC	RZA	SAH	TCM	URP
Académicos de Atlas		3–1		2–0				3–2	1–1	1–1			2–2
Atlético San Luis				5–1	3–0	2–2		3–2	2–3	1–2			3–3
Calor	2–2	3–4				3–4			1–0	1–3			1–0
Correcaminos			3–2		1–1	4–2	8–1				4–3	2–2	
Dep. San Juan	0–0		0–1			2–2	1–0				0–1	2–1	
La Piedad	1–3							0–2	2–3	1–0			1–1
Llaneros GV	0–9	0–3	3–3			0–3					0–4	1–3	
Mineros Fresnillo			2–1	3–1	6–0		6–2				1–0	3–1	
Necaxa				3–3	1–0		4–0	5–2		2–3			2–2
Real Zamora				1–0	3–0		9–0	3–2			1–1		0–0
Sahuayo	2–1	4–3	2–1			1–1			2–1			7–1	
Tecomán	3–2	1–2	0–2			0–1			0–1	0–2			
Uruapan				3–1	4–0		3–0	5–1			0–0	0–1	

Updated to match(es) played on 3 April 2016. Source: SoccerWay
Legend: Blue = home team win; Yellow = draw; Red = away team win.

==== Group 2 ====
===== Standings =====
Pos	Team	Pld	W	D	L	GF	GA	GD	Pts	Qualification
1	Sporting Canamy	12	6	4	2	22	10	+12	25	Advance to Liguilla
2	Chetumal	12	7	4	1	17	6	+11	25	Advance to Liguilla
3	FC Satélites	12	7	2	3	13	8	+5	25	Advance to Liguilla
4	Colibríes	12	5	6	1	28	15	+13	23	Advance to Liguilla
5	Lobos Prepa	12	7	0	5	21	26	−5	22	
6	Zorros UMSNH	12	5	1	6	26	22	+4	17	
7	Cuautla	12	4	4	4	12	7	+5	16	
8	Garzas UAEH	12	4	3	5	8	11	−3	15	
9	Deportivo Chimalhuacán	12	4	2	6	15	21	−6	15	
10	Patriotas de Córdoba	12	4	2	6	12	17	−5	14	
11	Selva Cañera	12	3	4	5	15	21	−6	14	
12	Celaya "B"	12	1	5	6	9	22	−13	10	
13	Deportivo Gladiadores	12	2	1	9	16	38	−22	8	

Last updated on April 3, 2016.
Source: SoccerWay

===== Results =====
Home \ Away	CEL	CHE	CLB	CUA	DCH	DGL	FCS	GUH	LOB	PCD	SEL	SPC	ZUM
Celaya		1–1	0–0		1–1		0–1	0–1		0–0		1–3	
Chetumal			1–0		4–0			1–1	1–0	1–0		0–0	4–1
Colibríes				1–1		7–2		3–1	2–0	4–1			3–3
Cuautla	3–0	0–0			2–0		0–0				0–0		
Dep. Chimalhuacán			4–4			1–0		2–0	0–2	3–1		0–4	4–0
Dep. Gladiadores	2–1	2–3		0–3			0–2				4–4	3–2	
FC Satélites		0–1	0–2		1–0			1–0		2–1		1–1	1–0
Garzas UAEH				1–0		1–0			0–1		0–2		2–0
Lobos Prepa	1–3			2–1		5–1	2–1				4–1	0–2	
Patriotas				1–0		3–1		0–0	2–1		2–0		0–2
Selva Cañera	2–2	1–0	1–1		2–0		1–3						
Sporting Canamy			1–1	0–1				1–1		3–1	3–0		
Zorros UMSNH	7–0			2–1		6–1			2–3		2–1	1–2	

Updated to match(es) played on 3 April 2016. Source: SoccerWay
Legend: Blue = home team win; Yellow = draw; Red = away team win.

=== Regular-season statistics ===
==== Top goalscorers ====
Players sorted first by goals scored, then by last name.

Rank	Player	Club	Goals
1	(Mexico) Julián Duarte	Atlético San Luis	13
2	(Mexico) Gustavo Adolfo Lozano	Sahuayo F.C.	11
2	(Mexico) Samuel Rodríguez	Académicos de Atlas	11
4	(Mexico) Juan Alfonso Torres	Mineros de Fresnillo	10
4	(Mexico) Edgar Quintana	Colibríes de Malinalco	10
6	(Mexico) Enrique Arce	Correcaminos UAT	9
6	(Mexico) Ricardo Hernández	Zorros UMSNH	9
6	(Mexico) José Adrián Ayala	Colibríes de Malinalco	9
6	(Mexico) Jesús Antonio Álvarez	Lobos Prepa	9

Source: Liga Premier

=== Liguilla ===
The four best teams of each group play two games against each other on a home-and-away basis. The higher seeded teams play on their home field during the second leg. The winner of each match up is determined by aggregate score. In the quarterfinals and semifinals, if the two teams are tied on aggregate the higher seeded team advances. In the final, if the two teams are tied after both legs, the match goes to extra time and, if necessary, a penalty shoot-out.

Quarter-finals
1	Real Zamora	2	3	5
8	La Piedad	1	0	1
4	Chetumal	0	2	2
5	FC Satélites (a)	1	1	2
2	Sahuayo	1	1	2
7	Atlético San Luis	1	0	1
3	Sporting Canamy (tp)	2	1	3
6	Colibríes	2	1	3

Semi-finals
1	Real Zamora	3	3	6
4	FC Satélites	1	3	4
2	Sahuayo	0	3	3
3	Sporting Canamy	2	2	4

Final
1	Real Zamora	2	2	4
3	Sporting Canamy	0	1	1

(tp) The team won the series by having a better position in the general table

==== Quarter-finals ====
The first legs was played on 8, 9 and 10 April, and the second legs was Played on 16 April 2016.

Team 1	Agg.	Team 2	1st leg	2nd leg
Real Zamora	5–1	La Piedad	2–1	3–0
Chetumal	2–2	FC Satélites (a)	1–0	2–1
Sahuayo	2–1	Atlético San Luis	1–1	1–0
Sporting Canamy	3–3	Colibríes de Malinalco	2–2	1–1

===== First leg =====
8 April 2016	Atlético San Luis	1–1	Sahuayo	San Juan de los Lagos, Jalisco
18:00	Galvez 61'	Report	Lozano 55'	Stadium: Estadio Antonio R. Márquez; Attendance: 700

9 April 2016	Colibríes de Malinalco	2–2	Sporting Canamy	Malinalco, State of Mexico
16:00	Quintana 35', 44'	Report	Ávila 33'; Uribe 90'	Stadium: Estadio La Loma; Attendance: 200

10 April 2016	FC Satélites	1–0	Chetumal	Tulancingo, Hidalgo
12:00	Mejía 66'	Report		Stadium: Estadio Primero de Mayo; Attendance: 500

10 April 2016	La Piedad	1–2	Real Zamora	La Piedad, Michoacán
16:00	Galván 82'	Report	Ramos 29'; Rodríguez 68'	Stadium: Estadio Juan N. López; Attendance: 1,650

===== Second leg =====
16 April 2016	Real Zamora	3–0 (5–1 agg.)	La Piedad	Zamora, Michoacán
16:00	Ramos 22'; Negrete 28'; Tello 82'	Report		Stadium: Unidad Deportiva El Chamizal; Attendance: 3,000

16 April 2016	Chetumal	2–1 (2–2 agg.)	FC Satélites	Chetumal, Quintana Roo
16:00	Flores 49', 50'	Report	Lazcano 44'	Stadium: Estadio 10 de Abril; Attendance: 1,860

16 April 2016	Sporting Canamy	1–1 (3–3 agg.)	Colibríes de Malinalco	Milpa Alta, Mexico City
16:00	Arrieta 76'	Report	García 44'	Stadium: Estadio Momoxco; Attendance: 500

16 April 2016	Sahuayo	1–0 (2–1 agg.)	Atlético San Luis	Sahuayo, Michoacán
17:00	Galván 15'	Report		Stadium: Unidad Deportiva Municipal; Attendance: 1,500

==== Semi-finals ====
The first legs was played on 20 April, and the second legs was played on 23 April 2016.

Team 1	Agg.	Team 2	1st leg	2nd leg
Real Zamora	6–4	FC Satélites	3–1	3–3
Sahuayo	3–4	Sporting Canamy	0–2	3–2

===== First leg =====
20 April 2016	FC Satélites	1–3	Real Zamora	Tulancingo, Hidalgo
16:00	Zendejas 87'	Report	Vázquez 71'; García 81'; Arredondo 89'	Stadium: Estadio Primero de Mayo; Attendance: 700

20 April 2016	Sporting Canamy	2–0	Sahuayo	Milpa Alta, Mexico City
16:00	Rodríguez 23', 73'	Report		Stadium: Estadio Momoxco; Attendance: 300

===== Second leg =====
23 April 2016	Real Zamora	3–3 (6–4 agg.)	FC Satélites	Zamora, Michoacán
16:00	Rodríguez 21'; Ramos 43'; García 80'	Report	Zendejas 9'; Lazcano 62'; Gutiérrez 71'	Stadium: Unidad Deportiva El Chamizal; Attendance: 3,000

23 April 2016	Sahuayo	3–2 (3–4 agg.)	Sporting Canamy	Sahuayo, Michoacán
17:00	Gil 37'; Galvez 53'; García 80'	Report	Rodríguez 71'; Arrieta 87'

==== Final ====
The first leg was played on 28 April, and the second leg was played on 1 May 2016.

Team 1	Agg.	Team 2	1st leg	2nd leg
Real Zamora	4–1	Sporting Canamy	2–0	2–1

===== First leg =====
28 April 2016	Sporting Canamy	0–2	Real Zamora	Milpa Alta, Mexico City
16:00		Report	Ramos 52'; Mendoza 90'	Stadium: Estadio Momoxco; Attendance: 1,000; Referee: (Mexico) Juan Ramírez Tostado

===== Second leg =====
1 May 2016	Real Zamora	2–1 (4–1 agg.)	Sporting Canamy	Zamora, Michoacán
16:00	Ramos 47'; Rodríguez 51'	Report	Rodríguez 24'	Stadium: Unidad Deportiva El Chamizal; Attendance: 5,000; Referee: (Mexico) Raúl Medina Parra

Clausura 2016 winners

1st title

== Relegation table ==
P	Team	Pts	G	Pts/G
1	Real Zamora	55	24	2.291
2	FC Satélites	53	24	2.208
3	Uruapan	49	24	2.041
4	Sporting Canamy	47	24	1.958
5	Chetumal	46	24	1.916
6	Sahuayo	45	24	1.875
7	Mineros de Fresnillo	45	24	1.875
8	Académicos	45	24	1.875
9	Lobos Prepa	43	24	1.791
10	Cuautla	42	24	1.750
11	Correcaminos	42	24	1.750
12	Colibríes	42	24	1.750
13	Atlético San Luis	42	24	1.750
14	Necaxa	38	24	1.583
15	Deportivo Chimalhuacán	34	24	1.500
16	Selva Cañera	32	24	1.333
17	Patriotas de Córdoba	32	24	1.333
18	Deportivo Gladiadores	32	24	1.333
19	La Piedad	32	24	1.333
20	Zorros UMSNH	23	24	0.958
21	Calor	22	24	0.916
22	Tecomán	21	23	0.913
23	Celaya	19	24	0.791
24	Deportivo San Juan	18	24	0.750
25	Garzas UAEH	18	24	0.750
26	Llaneros de Guadalupe	9	23	0.391

Last updated: 3 April 2016
Source:Segunda División
P = Position; G = Games played; Pts = Points; Pts/G = Ratio of points to games played

== Promotion Final ==
The Promotion Final is a series of matches played by the champions of the tournaments Apertura and Clausura, the game is played to determine the winning team of the promotion to Liga Premier de Ascenso. The first leg was played on 4 May 2016, and the second leg was played on 7 May 2016.

Team 1	Agg.	Team 2	1st leg	2nd leg
Real Zamora	7–1	Correcaminos "B"	5–0	2–1

=== First leg ===
4 May 2016	Correcaminos "B"	0–5	Real Zamora	Ciudad Victoria, Tamaulipas
19:00		Report	Mendoza 17'; Ramos 39'; Tello 44'; Rodríguez 51'; Arredondo 87'	Stadium: Estadio Marte R. Gómez; Attendance: 2,000; Referee: (Mexico) Antonio Olalde

=== Second leg ===
7 May 2016	Real Zamora	2–1 (7–1 agg.)	Correcaminos "B"	Zamora, Michoacán
17:00	Rodríguez 10'; Reyes 61'	Report	Arce 82'	Stadium: Unidad Deportiva El Chamizal; Attendance: 5,000; Referee: (Mexico) Edgar Espadas

2015–16 Liga de Nuevos Talentos season winners

1st title

== See also ==
- 2015–16 Liga MX season
- 2015–16 Ascenso MX season
- 2015–16 Liga Premier de Ascenso season
