= Real Zamora =

Association football club in Mexico

Deportivo Zamora F.C.
- Full name: Deportivo Zamora Fútbol Club
- Nickname: Los chongueros (The Chongos zamoranos)
- Founded: 26 December 1950; 75 years ago
- Ground: Unidad Deportiva El Chamizal; Zamora, Michoacán, Mexico
- Capacity: 5,000
- League: Liga Premier (Serie B)
- Clausura 2025: 10th
- Website: www.realzamora.com
Home colours	Away colours	Third colours

Deportivo Zamora Fútbol Club is a Mexican football club, based in Zamora, Michoacán that currently plays in the Liga TDP. The club was put on a hiatus during the 2019 and 2020 seasons, due to being in a process to improve its facilities and aspire to a promotion to the Liga de Expansión MX. The club was formed in 1950 and has played in the first division among other leagues in Mexico. In April 2016, Real Zamora defeated Sporting Canamy 2–0 to clinch a spot from the Liga de Ascenso de México to the Liga Premier de Ascenso against UAT B, after that Zamora defeated UAT B and earned the promotion to the Liga Premier de Ascenso. In 2019, Real Zamora went into hiatus due to a lack of financial and political support for the project. Between 2024 and 2025, it was taken over by other owners, although they only used the club's name to compete, without playing in Zamora.

In 2024, a new club named Deportivo Zamora F.C. was founded, which is the club's current representative, playing in the Liga TDP since 2024–25 season.

== History ==
=== C.D. Zamora ===
The club was founded on December 26, 1950 and quickly joined the Segunda División de México along with Zacatepec, Monterrey, Toluca, Irapuato, Querétaro, Morelia and Pachuca. Some clubs were newcomers, and some were rejoining the league. In their first league, the club quickly became a contender and finished a couple of points behind the champion Zacatepec, who earned the chance to join the Primera División de México. The following years were also successful years, but not good enough to crown themselves.

In the 1954-55 tournament the club once again finished runner-up, this time just behind Atlas;, this time the club was allowed to be promoted after the federation decided to increase the number of clubs in the top division to 14. A playoff tournament was organized with 2 clubs from the Primera División along with the 11 and 12 place clubs from the Primera División clubs: Cuautla FC, Zamora, Querétaro, Atlante and Marte. With the result of Atlante remaining in the top division, joined by Cuautla FC and Zamora. Querétaro remained in the Segunda División, joined by the relegated Marte.

In the 1955-56 season the club played its first tournament in the top league under the management of the Enrique Álvarez. The club had a terrible time in the top division and so lost the category, being relegated back to the Segunda División, leaving its spot to Monterrey, who had been promoted.

In the 1956–57 season the club finally won its first title led by the Argentine Raúl Leguizamón. This time the club took over the empty spot left by Monterrey, who a year ago had taken over the spot Zamora had left. That same year, Puebla decided to leave the league, and so its spot was taken over by Atlético Morelia, marking this the first time 2 clubs from the state of Michoacán played in the top division.

The club once again lost the category in the 1959-60 tournament after playing 3 not-so-good tournaments, with its best season finish in 1957–58, finishing 7th with 25 points. In 1960, the club finished last under the management of Carlos Seville.

The club would not return to the first Primera División, having 2 good opportunities one in 1963-64 when they played a promotion matched against Cruz Azul who would beat them 7–1. The club would eventually be relegated to the Tercera División de México where they would win the 1977-78 title to return to the Segunda División, where in 1982-83 tournament they would have its second opportunity to return to the top division facing Unión de Curtidores in a second promotional match which they lost 1–0.

=== Resurgence ===
The Segunda División team returned to Zamora in 1989–90, when the Cachorros Guaymas franchise was moved to the city. In this season, the club won the Segunda División "B" and was promoted to the Segunda División "A". In 1990-91 was relegated to the Segunda División "B", and dissolved in 1994.

The club has played on and off since 1994 until 2004, when was created a new team called Jaguares de Zamora, a Chiapas inferior reserve squad. In 2007 the club became once again independent and rejoined the Segunda División de México until 2008.

In 2010, the club returned with the name Atlético Zamora in the Segunda División, playing in Liga de Nuevos Talentos, this team was dissolved in 2011, its franchise was moved to Cuernavaca, Morelos to compete in the Liga Premier de Ascenso.

=== Real Zamora ===
In 2008 a club called Real Zamora was created in the Tercera División de México. Real Zamora was created from the license of Real Cavadas, which played at La Piedad, in the 2008–09 season, the team played with Real Cavadas register. As of the 2009–10 season, the team got its name officially.

In the 2013–14 season Real Zamora reached the final of the championship, and was defeated by Tuzos de Pachuca. The status as runner-up allowed the team to be promoted to the Liga de Nuevos Talentos.

In the Apertura 2015 tournament Real Zamora was a runner-up of the Liga de Nuevos Talentos, the squad was defeated by Universidad Autónoma de Tamaulipas. However, in Clausura 2016, Real Zamora won the tournament by defeating Sporting Canamy by a 4-1 aggregate score. The squad won the right to play the promotion playoff against Universidad Autónoma de Tamaulipas, Real Zamora won the series by a 7-1 aggregate score and was promoted to the Liga Premier de Ascenso.

In the 2016-17 season Real Zamora was promoted to the Liga Premier de Ascenso, with this achievement, the club and the city council collaborated to resume the construction works of the Estadio Zamora with the aim of fulfilling the guidelines of the Segunda División. On October 1, 2016, Real Zamora played its first game in the stadium. The team played its first three games in the Estadio Juan N. López, La Piedad. In June 2017, the former footballer Heriberto Morales acquired 30% of the club's shares through the Promotora Valladolid. However, he sold his participation a year later.

In July 2018 José Trinidad Melgoza, who was part of the board of the Reboceros de La Piedad, decided to move the project of the mentioned club to join him with the Zamora's team, including footballers and coaching staff, and he went on to be a majority partner in addition to taking the vice-presidency of the team. With the arrival of Melgoza to the administration, a Real Zamora's reserve squad was created, this team plays in the Tercera División, However, the reserve squad participate in this season with the Queseros de San José register.

In December 2018 Melgoza returned to La Piedad board, with this fact Real Zamora and Reboceros de La Piedad started an exchange of players and coaches between both teams with the aim of uniting their projects and promoting the development of football in the region.

On June 28, 2019 it was announced that the team's franchise was put on a hiatus during the season due to the breach of the sports infrastructure required by the Liga Premier- Serie A, the period without activity was reserved to make the necessary improvements to comply with the regulation and thus qualify for promotion to a higher category.

In July 2020 due to the problem with its facilities, the Real Zamora franchise was used so that Azores de Hidalgo could compete in the Segunda División de México. For the 2021–22 season the Real Zamora franchise was moved to the city of Querétaro, Querétaro, and officially became Inter de Querétaro F.C.

In 2024 Inter de Querétaro renounced its rights to the franchise and returned to Zamora, Michoacán, so Real Zamora returned to compete officially. However, the team is totally independent of the administration it had until 2019, so for its return to the competition it was established in the city of La Piedad instead of Zamora. Also the team was enrolled on the Liga Premier – Serie B. Initially, Bucaneros de Zitácuaro was going to absorb the franchise, but the league did not authorize the move, leaving Real Zamora as the name of the team but with players and administration from Zitácuaro. In February 2025, the team was relocated from La Piedad to Toluca, State of Mexico for logistical reasons related to the team's travel to their matches.

On June 27, 2025 the team went on hiatus again due to a lack of support to maintain its participation in the cities where it had intended to establish itself during the previous season, which meant that the team would finish the 2024–25 season playing its home matches in Toluca. Due to this situation, the team will not participate in the 2025–26 Liga Premier de México season.

=== Deportivo Zamora F.C. ===
In February 2024, the return of a professional team to Zamora was announced when Atlético Chavinda announced that it would relocate to Zamora due to the existence of better infrastructure, financial, and sporting conditions than those offered in Chavinda, its original town. In the summer of 2024, the team was renamed Deportivo Zamora F.C. to reflect its new hometown.

== Players ==
=== First-team squad ===
As of 20 January 2025

Note: Flags indicate national team as defined under FIFA eligibility rules; some limited exceptions apply. Players may hold more than one non-FIFA nationality.

No. / Pos. / Nation / Player	No. / Pos. / Nation / Player

== Honours ==
- Segunda División de México (1): 1956-1957
- Runner Up: 1950–1951, 1954–1955, 1970–1971, 1982–1983
- Serie B de México (1): Clausura 2016
- Runner Up: Apertura 2015
- Tercera División de México (1): 1977-1978
- Runner Up: 2013–2014

== See also ==
- Football in Mexico
