= Francisco Orozco y Jiménez =

José Francisco Orozco y Jiménez
- Archbishop of Guadalajara
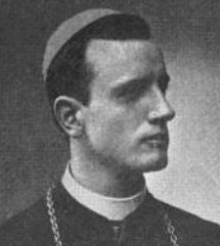
- Church: Catholic Church
- Archdiocese: Archdiocese of Guadalajara
- In office: 2 December 1912 – 18 February 1936
- Predecessor: José de Jesús Ortiz y Rodríguez
- Successor: José Garibi y Rivera
- Previous post: Bishop of Chiapas (1902-1912)

Orders
- Ordination: 17 December 1887
- Consecration: 15 August 1902 by Próspero Alarcón y Sánchez de la Barquera

Personal details
- Born: 19 November 1864 Zamora, Michoacán, Mexican Empire
- Died: 18 February 1936 (aged 71) Guadalajara, Jalisco, Mexico
- Motto: In Fide Et Lenitate

José Francisco Orozco y Jiménez (19 November 1864 – 18 February 1936) was archbishop of Guadalajara, Jalisco, Mexico from 1913 to 1936.

== Biography ==
José Orozco y Jiménez was born in Zamora, Michoacán on 19 November 1864. He was ordained a priest in 1887 and appointed Bishop of Chiapas in 1902.

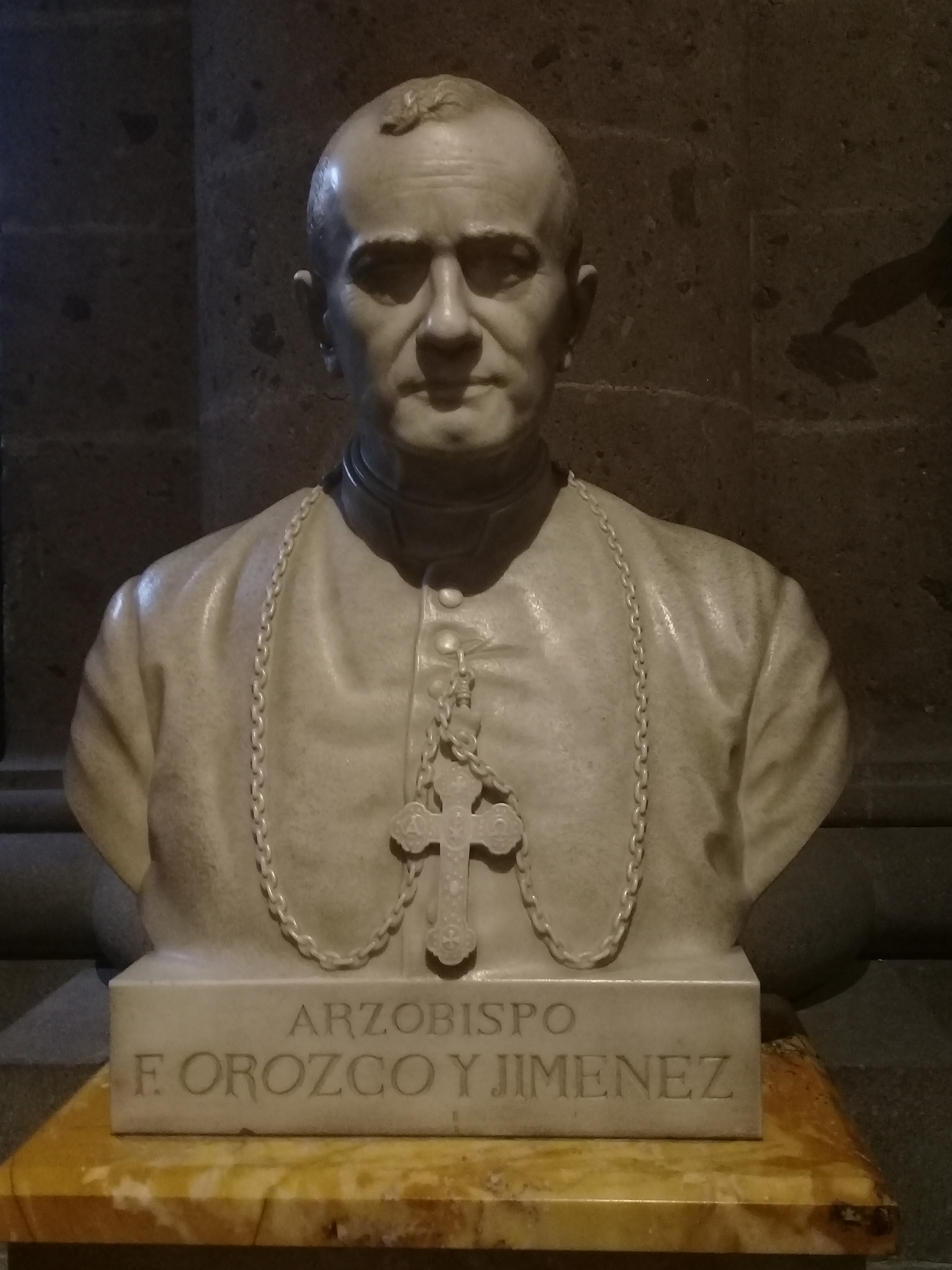
Statue of José Francisco Orozco y Jiménez

As Archbishop of Guadalajara, Orozco led protests against the secularization decrees imposed upon Mexican clergy in 1918. His tenure also saw an armed rebellion led by pro-Catholic forces against the Mexican government that occurred predominantly within his archdiocese. The rebellion is known as the Cristero War.

He died at his home in Guadalajara on 18 February 1936.

== External links and additional sources ==
- Photo, from thefarsight2.blogspot.com
- Cheney, David M. "Diocese of San Cristóbal de Las Casas". Catholic-Hierarchy.org. (for Chronology of Bishops)^{self-published}
- Chow, Gabriel. "Diocese of San Cristóbal de Las Casas". GCatholic.org. (for Chronology of Bishops)^{self-published}
- Cheney, David M. "Archdiocese of Guadalajara". Catholic-Hierarchy.org. (for Chronology of Bishops)^{self-published}
- Chow, Gabriel. "Metropolitan Archdiocese of Guadalajara". GCatholic.org. (for Chronology of Bishops)^{self-published}
