= José Salazar López =

Mexican Cardinal of the Roman Catholic Church

His Eminence José Salazar López
- Archbishop Emeritus of Guadalajara
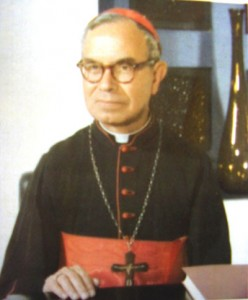
- Photo taken sometime in the 1980s.
- Church: Roman Catholic Church
- Archdiocese: Guadalajara
- See: Guadalajara
- Appointed: 21 February 1970
- Installed: 1 March 1970
- Term ended: 15 May 1987
- Predecessor: José Garibi Rivera
- Successor: Juan Jesús Posadas Ocampo
- Other post: Cardinal-Priest of Santa Emerenziana a Tor Fiorenza (1973-91)
- Previous posts: Titular Bishop of Prusias ad Hypium (1961-67); Coadjutor Bishop of Zamora (1961-67); Bishop of Zamora (1967-70); President of the Mexican Episcopal Conference (1973-80)

Orders
- Ordination: 26 May 1934 by José Garibi Rivera
- Consecration: 20 August 1961 by José Garibi Rivera
- Created cardinal: 5 March 1973 by Pope Paul VI
- Rank: Cardinal-Priest

Personal details
- Born: José Salazar López; 12 January 1910 Ameca, Jalisco, Mexico
- Died: 9 July 1991 (aged 81) Santísima Trinidad Hospital, Guadalajara, Mexico
- Buried: Guadalajara Cathedral
- Parents: Cándido Salazar Ortiz; Luisa López Villaseñor
- Education: Pontifical Gregorian University
- Motto: Ministrare

Styles of José Salazar López
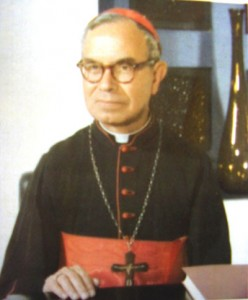
- Reference style: His Eminence
- Spoken style: Your Eminence
- Informal style: Cardinal
- See: Guadalajara (emeritus)

José Salazar López (January 12, 1910 – July 9, 1991) was a Mexican Cardinal of the Roman Catholic Church. He served as Archbishop of Guadalajara from 1970 to 1987, and was elevated to the cardinalate in 1973.

== Biography ==
Born in Ameca, Jalisco, José Salazar López studied at the seminary in Guadalajara and the Pontifical Gregorian University in Rome before being ordained to the priesthood on May 26, 1934. He then did pastoral work in Guadalajara until 1961. During this time, Salazar led the construction of the Conciliar Seminary of Guadalajara, where he later served as a professor and prefect of studies (1934-1944), vice-rector (1944-1950), and rector (1950-1961). He was made Apostolic Visitor to the seminaries in Puebla and Durango in 1958.

On May 22, 1961, Salazar was appointed Coadjutor Bishop of Zamora and Titular bishop of Prusias ad Hypium by Pope John XXIII. He received his episcopal consecration on the following August 20 from Cardinal José Garibi y Rivera, with Archbishop Francisco Nuño y Guerrero and Bishop José Anaya y Diez de Bonilla serving as co-consecrators. After attending the Second Vatican Council from 1962 to 1965, Salazar succeeded Anaya y Diez as Bishop of Zamora on September 15, 1967. He was later named Archbishop of Guadalajara on February 21, 1970.

Pope Paul VI created him Cardinal Priest of S. Emerenziana a Tor Fiorenza in the consistory of March 5, 1973. Salazar once served as President of the Mexican Episcopal Conference, and was one of the cardinal electors who participated in the conclaves of August and October 1978, which selected Popes John Paul I and John Paul II respectively. He resigned as Guadalajara's archbishop on May 15, 1987, and lost the right to participate in another conclave upon reaching age 80 on January 12, 1990.

The Cardinal died from a heart attack in Guadalajara, at the age of 81. He is buried in the metropolitan cathedral of the same city.

== External links and additional sources ==
- Cardinals of the Holy Roman Church
- Cheney, David M. "Archdiocese of Guadalajara". Catholic-Hierarchy.org. (for Chronology of Bishops)^{self-published}
- Chow, Gabriel. "Metropolitan Archdiocese of Guadalajara". GCatholic.org. (for Chronology of Bishops)^{self-published}

Catholic Church titles
Preceded by José Anaya y Diez de Bonilla	Bishop of Zamora; 1967–1970	Succeeded by Adolfo Hernández Hurtado
Preceded by José Garibi y Rivera	Archbishop of Guadalajara; 1970–1987	Succeeded by Juan Jesús Posadas Ocampo
