= Diocese of Zamora in Mexico =

Latin Catholic jurisdiction in Mexico

Diocese of Zamora in Mexico Dioecesis Zamorensis in Mexico Diócesis de Zamora in México
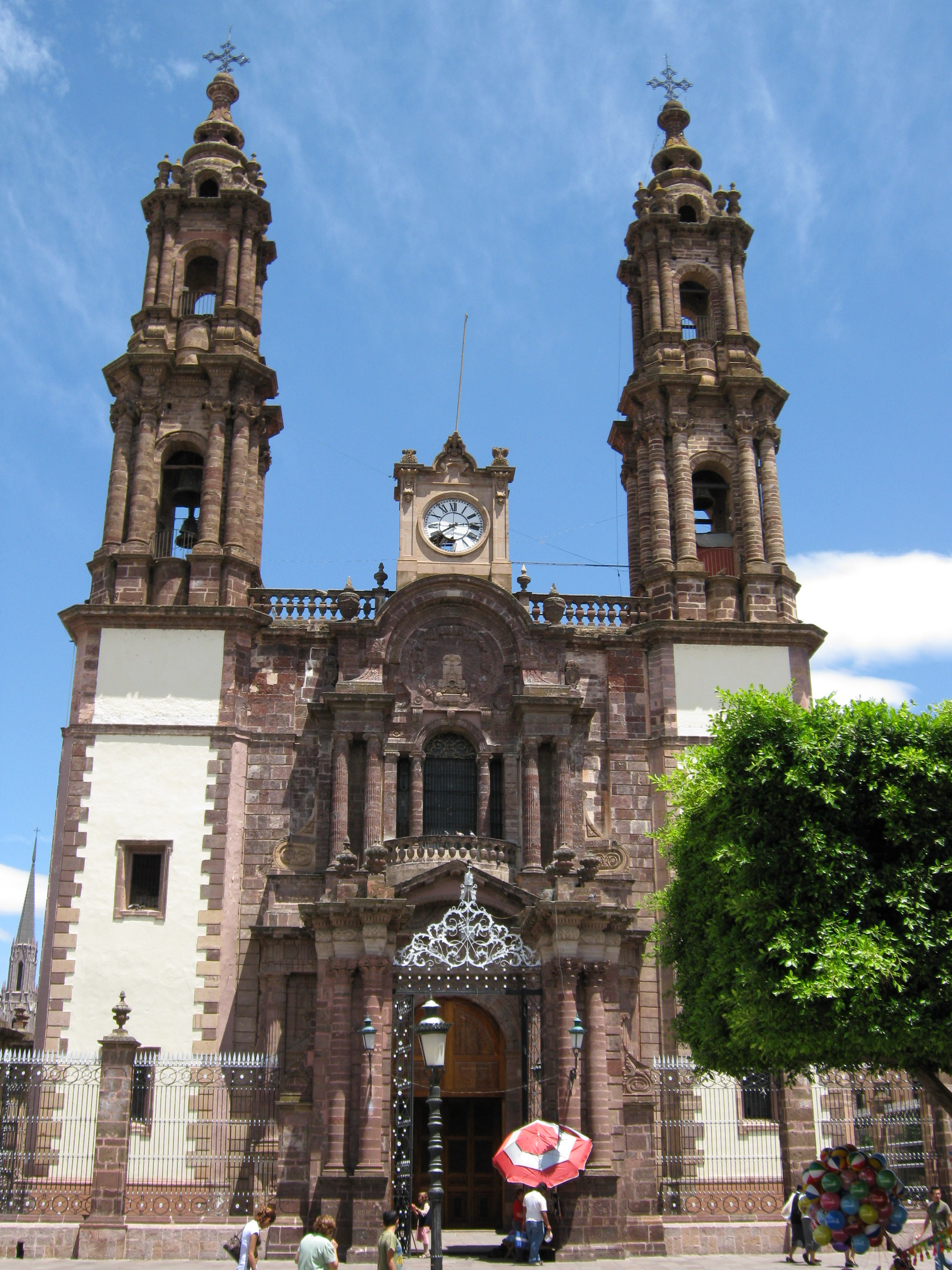
- Catedral de la Inmaculada Concepción de María

Location
- Country: Mexico
- Ecclesiastical province: Morelia

Statistics
- Area: 4,635 sq mi (12,000 km^{2})
- Population: Total; Catholics: (as of 2010); 1,629,000; 1,465,000 (89.9%)
- Parishes: 140

Information
- Denomination: Catholic Church
- Sui iuris church: Latin Church
- Rite: Roman Rite
- Established: 26 January 1863 (163 years ago)
- Cathedral: Cathedral of the Immaculate Conception of Mary; Cathedral of Our Lady of Guadalupe

Current leadership
- Pope: Leo XIV
- Bishop: Joel Ocampo Gorostieta
- Metropolitan Archbishop: José Armando Álvarez Cano
- Auxiliary Bishops: Francisco Figueroa Cervantes
- Bishops emeritus: Javier Navarro Rodríguez

Map
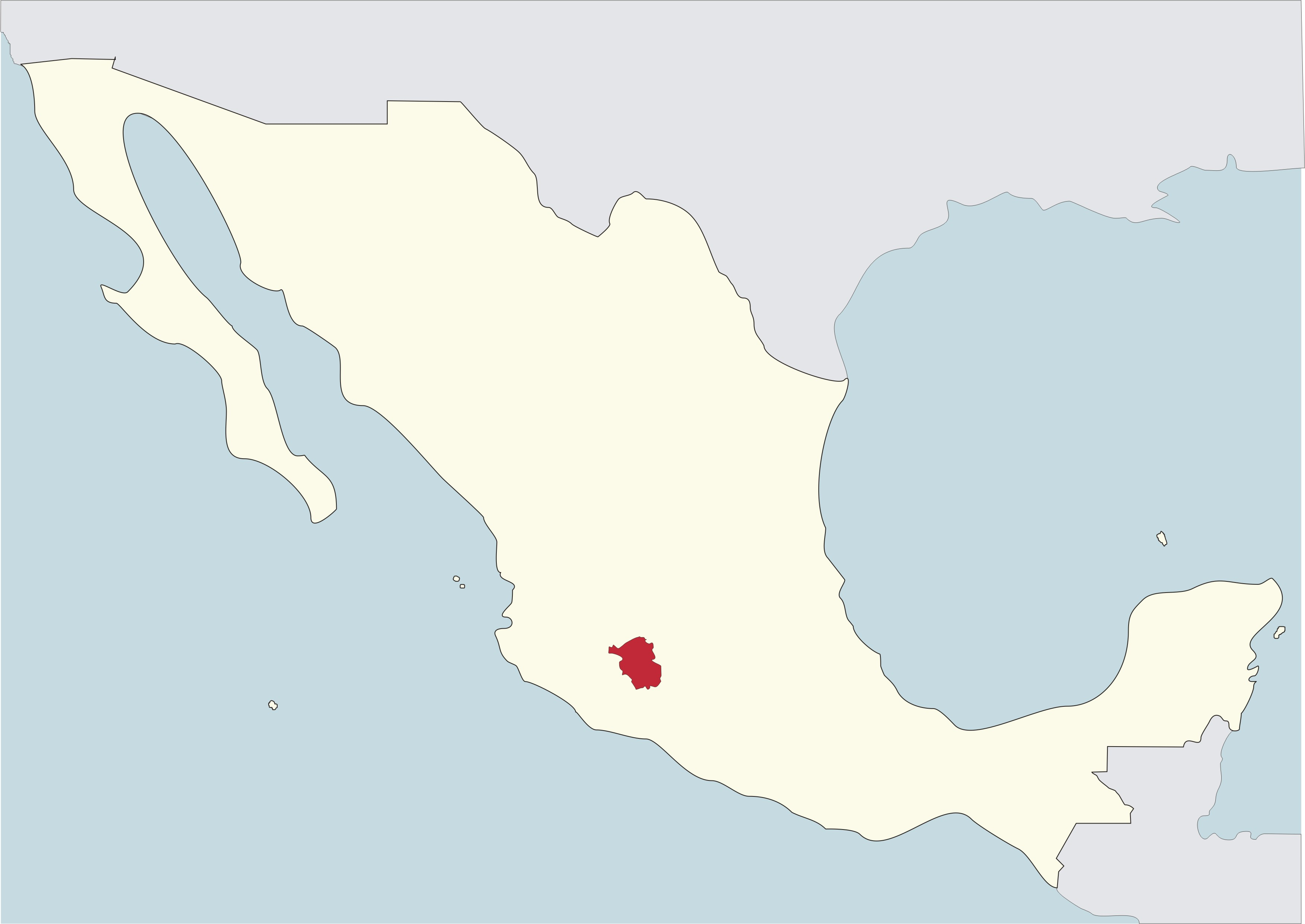

The Diocese of Zamora (Latin: Dioecesis Zamorensis in Mexico) is a Latin Church ecclesiastical territory or diocese of the Catholic Church. The diocese is a suffragan in the ecclesiastical province of the metropolitan Archdiocese of Morelia. It was erected on 26 January 1863. It has two co-cathedrals in the episcopal see of Zamora, Michoacán: Cathedral of the Immaculate Conception of Mary and Cathedral of Our Lady of Guadalupe

== Bishops ==
=== Ordinaries ===
- José Antonio de la Peña y Navarro (1863–1877)
- José María Cázares y Martínez (1878–1908), retired
- José de Jesús Fernández y Barragán (1908–1909), resigned
- José Othón Núñez y Zárate (1909–1922), appointed Coadjutor Archbishop of Antequera, Oaxaca
- Manuel Fulcheri y Pietrasanta (1922–1946)
- José Gabriel Anaya y Diez de Bonilla (1947–1967), resigned
- José Salazar López (1967–1970), appointed Archbishop of Guadalajara, Jalisco (Cardinal in 1973)
- Adolfo Hernández Hurtado (1970–1974), resigned
- José Esaul Robles Jiménez (1974–1993)
- Carlos Suárez Cázares (1994–2006), resigned
- Javier Navarro Rodríguez (2007–2025), retired
- Joel Ocampo Gorostieta (2025–Present)

=== Coadjutor bishops ===
- José de Jesús Fernández y Barragán (1899-1908)
- José Salazar López (1961-1967); later made cardinal

=== Auxiliary bishops ===
- Salvador Martinez Silva (1940-1951), appointed Auxiliary Bishop of Morelia, Michoacán
- Jaime Calderón Calderón (2012-2018), appointed Bishop of Tapachula, Chiapas
- Francisco Figueroa Cervantes (2021-Present)

=== Other priests of this diocese who became bishops ===
- Vicente Castellanos y Núñez, appointed Bishop of Campeche in 1912
- Antonio Guízar y Valencia, appointed Bishop of Chihuahua in 1920
- José de Jesús Sahagún de la Parra, appointed Bishop of Tula, Hidalgo in 1961
- José de Jesús Garcia Ayala, appointed Auxiliary Bishop of Campeche in 1963
- José Luis Amezcua Melgoza, appointed Bishop of Campeche in 1995
- José Armando Álvarez Cano, appointed Prelate of Huautla, Oaxaca in 2011
- Rafael Valdéz Torres, appointed Bishop of Ensenada, Baja California Norte in 2013

== Institutions for Catholic Education ==
- Seminary of Zamora
- Institute Cázares

== Saints, beati, and servants of God of the Diocese of Zamora in Mexico ==
- Rafael Guízar y Valencia (1878-1938)
- José Ma. Cázares y Martínez (1832-1909)
- José Sánchez del Río (1913-1928)

== Territorial losses ==
| Year | Along with | To form |
|---|---|---|
| 1913 | Archdiocese of Michoacán | Diocese of Tacámbaro |

== Episcopal See ==
- Zamora, Michoacán

== See also ==
- Immaculate Conception Cathedral, Zamora de Hidalgo

== External links and references ==
- Diócesis de Zamora official site (in Spanish)
- "Diocese of Zamora". Catholic-Hierarchy.
