= Estadio Zamora =

Multi-use stadium in Zamora, Mexico

- Interactive map of Estadio Zamora
- Full name: Estadio Zamora
- Location: Zamora, Michoacán, Mexico
- Coordinates: 19°59′37″N 102°14′16″W
- Owner: Zamora City Council
- Capacity: 7,200
- Surface: Natural grass

Construction
- Opened: 27 December 2004

Tenant
- Real Zamora (2016–2019)

The Estadio Zamora, also known as the Coloso de La Beatilla, is a multi-use stadium in Zamora, Michoacán, Mexico

== History ==
Estadio Zamora, also known as the Coloso de la Beatilla, is a multi-use stadium in Zamora, Michoacán, Mexico, that was inaugurated in 2004. In 2016, the Zamora municipal government, which owns the stadium, invested approximately MXN$1.7 million to rehabilitate the association football field and improve the facility's infrastructure.

As of 2024, the stadium has been left in deteriorating condition because the local teams have preferred to play their matches at the stadium located in the Unidad Deportiva El Chamizal, located in the Zamora downtown.

It was currently used mostly for football matches and was the home stadium for Real Zamora. It has capacity for 7,500 people.
