= Zamora de Hidalgo Cathedral =

Immaculate Conception Cathedral
- Catedral de la Inmaculada Concepción de María de Zamora de Hidalgo
- Cathedral of Zamora
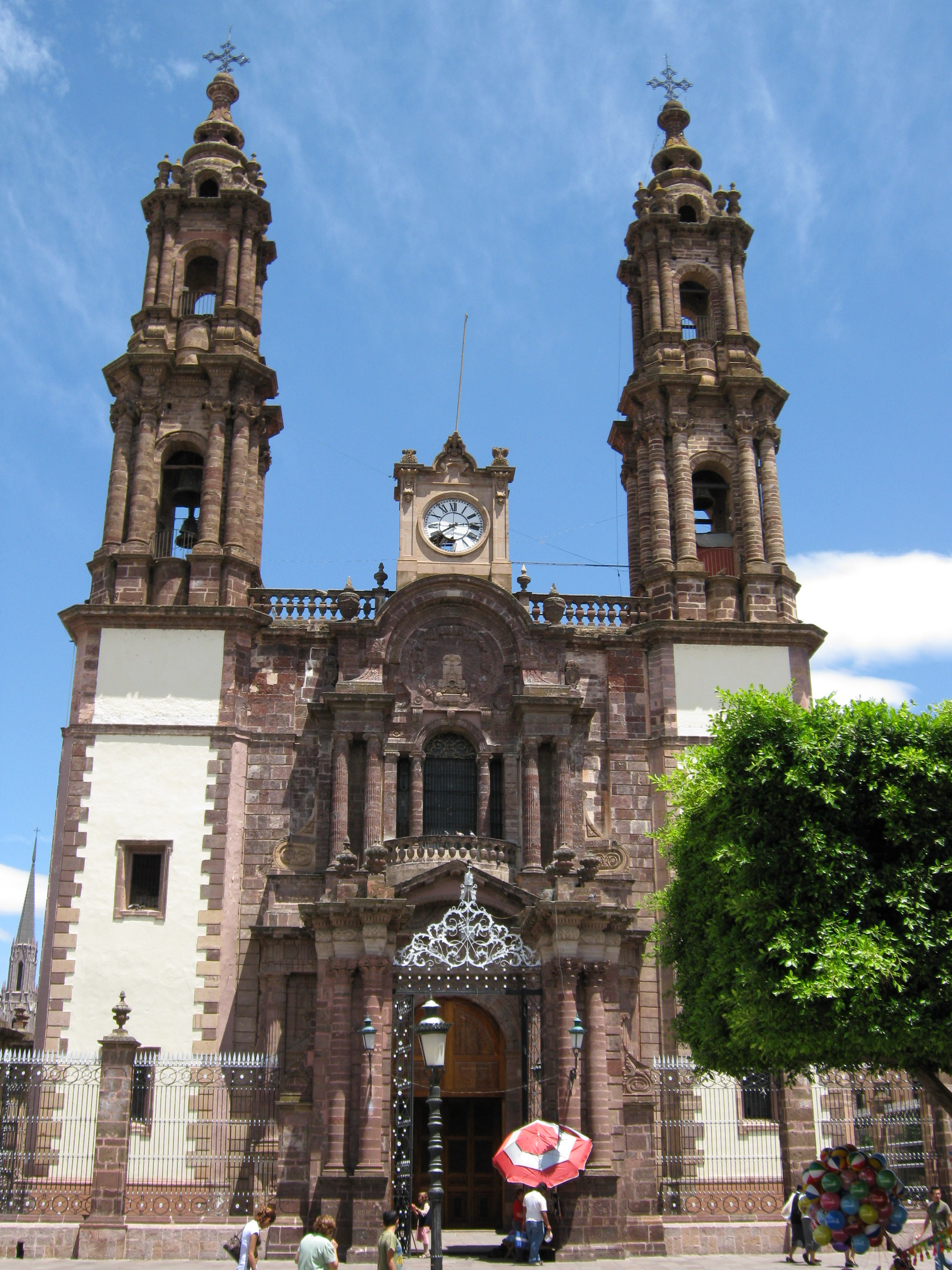
- Immaculate Conception Cathedral
- 19°59′1″N 102°17′6″W
- Location: Zamora de Hidalgo
- Country: Mexico
- Denomination: Roman Catholic Church

History
- Status: Co-cathedral
- Founded: 1832
- Dedication: Immaculate Conception

Architecture
- Functional status: Active
- Architect: Eduardo Tresguerras
- Style: Neoclassical
- Years built: 1832-1838
- Groundbreaking: 1832
- Completed: 1838

Administration
- Archdiocese: Archdiocese of Morelia
- Diocese: Diocese of Zamora in Mexico

Clergy
- Archbishop: José Armando Álvarez Cano
- Bishop: Joel Ocampo Gorostieta

The Immaculate Conception Cathedral (Spanish: Catedral de la Inmaculada Concepción de María), also known as the Zamora de Hidalgo Cathedral, is a Catholic religious building built in the first half of the 19th century by the famous Celayan architect Eduardo Tresguerras. It is located in the Michoacan city of Zamora de Hidalgo in Mexico.

== History ==
It was built between 1832 and 1838.

In neoclassical style, it bears some resemblance to the Temple of Carmen in the city of Celaya (also made by Tresguerras).

== Gallery ==
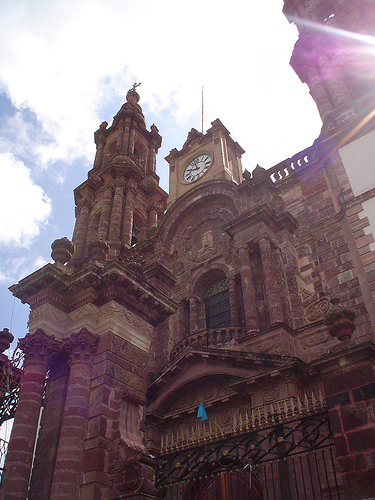
Facade

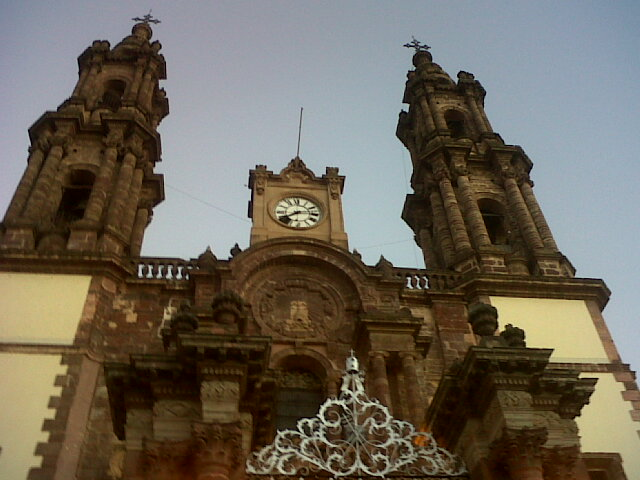
Towers

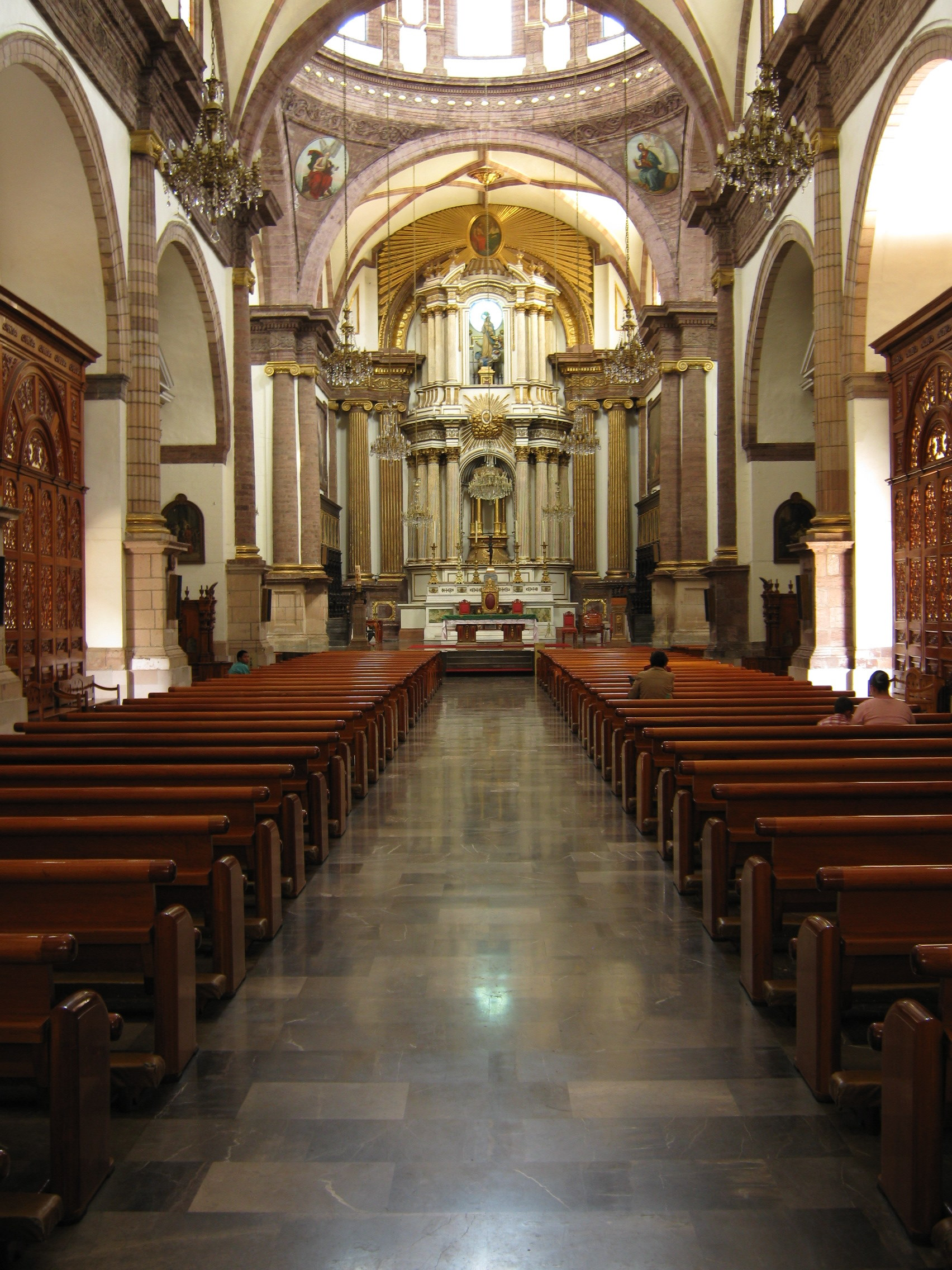
Interior

== See also ==
- Roman Catholicism in Mexico
- Immaculate Conception Cathedral
