= Zamora Municipality, Michoacán =

Coordinates: 19.9924°N 102.2631°W

Zamora
- Municipality
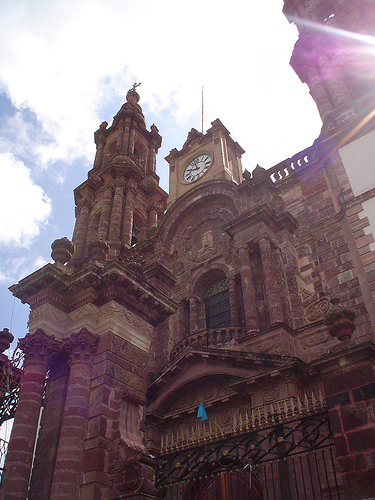
- Diocesan Sanctuary of Our Lady of Guadalupe

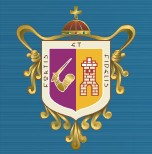
- Coat of arms

- Location in Michoacán
- Country: Mexico
- State: Michoacán
- Municipal seat: Zamora, Michoacán

Area
  - Total: 335 km^{2} (129 sq mi)

Population (2015)
  - Total: 204,860
  - Density: 612/km^{2} (1,580/sq mi)

Zamora Municipality is a municipality in Michoacán, Mexico. The seat is at Zamora, Michoacán.

Municipalities of Zamora:

-Ejidio Independencia La Labor

-Guamuchil

-La Estancia

-Sauz de Magaña

-Atacheo, a town where the entire municipality gathers to celebrate holidays, like Independence Day and religious holidays. Especially on 12 December, when they celebrate día de la Virgin de Guadalupe.

Three police officers were killed and 10 people injured in a shoot-out in Zamora Municipality on May 26, 2019.
