= Yolanda Pérez =

American singer-songwriter (born 1983)

- Also known as: La Potranquita
- Born: May 20, 1983 (age 43); Long Beach, California
- Origin: Los Angeles
- Genre: Banda
- Occupation: Singer-songwriter
- Years active: 2001–present
- Label: Sony BMG

Yolanda Pérez (born May 20, 1983) is an American singer-songwriter who specializes in banda music. She is sometimes known by the stage name "La Potranquita", (Spanish: "little filly"), a name taken by her father from his home city of Zacatecas, Mexico.

Pérez was born in Los Angeles, California. Her family later moved to Montclair, California. She graduated from Montclair High School in 2001. When she was 11 years old, Pérez won a music contest held in the Los Angeles-area Lynwood. As part of the prize package, she recorded an album that launched her musical career. She has since recorded several more albums. Her career was especially enhanced when she signed with the Fonovisa label, part of the Univision Music Group.

Pérez followed in the footsteps of her father and grandparents who were also exponents of banda music. Her minor-label albums exhibited all the traditional characteristics of banda, but from Déjenme Llorar (2003) onwards she has combined the banda sound with modern elements such as rap as well as introducing set-piece dialogues into some tracks. Her music also shows other influences from hip hop and R&B artists – this has led her to include Spanglish phrasing in some lyrics, such as in the duet Estoy Enamorada with Don Cheto. Pérez therefore, while continuing to exemplify traditional banda, has placed her own stamp and interpretation on this genre. In 2005, Pérez was nominated for an Urban Artist of the Year award at the 17th Lo Nuestro Awards.

Pérez has also performed public service announcements and has been involved with other charitable work. In 2006, she volunteered to help with the "Got Milk" campaign, explaining that Latin American women tend to worry about outer beauty but need to also focus on their diet.

== Discography ==
- La Cojelona
- El Hombre Que Yo Amo
- Con la Banda Costa Grande
- La Potranquita de Zacatecas (Kimo's Music, 2001)
- Exitos: La Basurita / Cuentas Claras (2002)
- Dejenme Llorar (Fonovisa Records, 2003)
- La Potranquita Con Banda (Kimo's Music, 2004)
- Aquí Me Tienes (Fonovisa Records, 2004)
- Esto Es Amor (Fonovisa Records, 2005)
- Te Sigo Amando (Fonovisa Records, 2007)
- Todo De Mi (Fonovisa Records, 2008)
- Con Mariachi (Potranquita Music, 2010)
- Mujer Virtuosa ( Fonovisa Records, 2022)
