= Don Cheto =

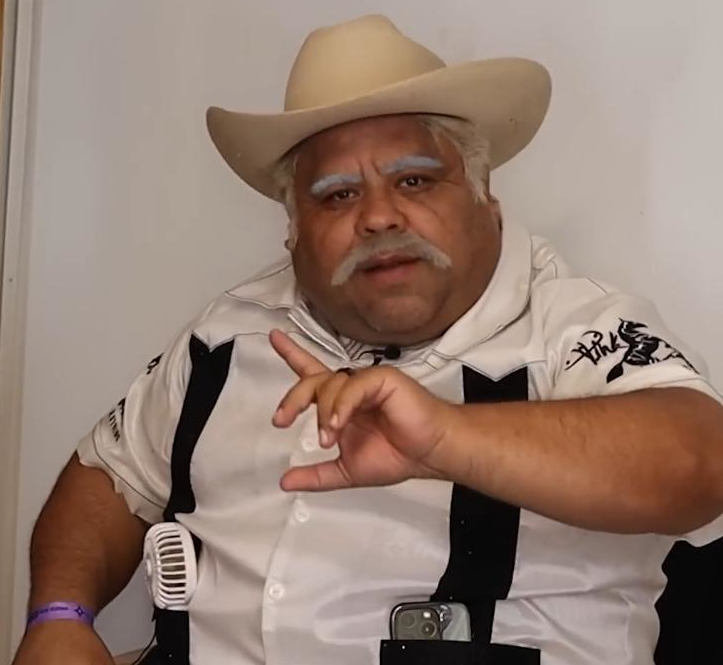
- First appearance: 2003
- Portrayed by: Juan Carlos Razo

In-universe information
- Aliases: Aniceto, El Hombre del Vozarrón
- Gender: Male
- Occupation: Singer, television host, radio personality
- Nationality: Mexican
- Origin: La Sauceda, Zamora Municipality, Michoacán, Mexico

Don Cheto (born 1942 in the Municipality of Zamora de Hidalgo, as "El Hombre del Vozarrón" ("the loud-voiced man"), is a fictional Mexican radio and television personality widely known in Mexican American pop culture. Don Cheto is portrayed by Juan Razo, who, contrary to popular belief, is very young compared to the now 84-year-old character of Don Cheto.

He is the host of El Show de Don Cheto (The Don Cheto Show), an hour-long Spanish language variety show on Channel 62 in Los Angeles, and shown also on sister stations owned by Lieberman Broadcasting. The show features a variety of games (including football and name-that-tune), a live guitar band, a little person, and girls dancing in revealing outfits.

Don Cheto also makes an appearance in Grand Theft Auto V as himself, alongside the Mexican Institute of Sound, in the radio station East Los FM.

Don Cheto music albums include Piporreando, Tueniwan 21, and El Hombre del vozarrón. He released a music video parody of Gangnam Style featuring East LA gangster stereotypes. The video titled Ganga Style featured guest cameos by Latin Grammy winner Ana Bárbara and the late Latin Grammy nominee Jenni Rivera; it has reached over 57 million views on YouTube.

== Shows ==
=== El Show de Don Cheto (radio) ===
In September 2011 Don Cheto was a 5-year $3.5 Million extension contract with Lieberman Broadcasting Inc. The show originally launched in 2005 hosted by Don Cheto co-hosted by Marlene Quinto, currently airing mornings on national radio stations with its base in Los Angeles out of the 105.5 Que Buena call signs. Que Buena is the highest rated Spanish radio station in the Mexican Regional formats in the United States, according to Arbitron Ratings. Que Buena has remained the dominating powerhouse in Los Angeles, thanks to its diverse programming and constant airwave revamps.

=== El Show de Don Cheto (TV show) ===
A variety show launched in 2007. Currently airing re-runs on Channel 61 in Houston and Channel 62 in Los Angeles on Estrella TV.

== Albums ==
- Hablando Por Lo Claro (2003)
- Piporreando (2004)
- El Hombre Del Vozarrón/El Chancho Frijolero (2005)
- Vamos Pa'l Rancho/Muchos Más: Linea De Oro (2007)
- El Gran Show De Don Cheto y Sus Amigos (2007)

=== Singles ===
- Vamos Pa'l Rancho (2003).
- Pa'l Norte featuring Calle 13 (2007)
- La Crisis (2010)
- Estoy Enamorada con Yolanda Pérez (2004)
- Ganga Style (2012)
- El Muy Muy con Amandititita (2012)
- El Tatuado(2013)
