= José Garibi y Rivera =

His Eminence José Garibi y Rivera
- Cardinal, Archbishop Emeritus of Guadalajara
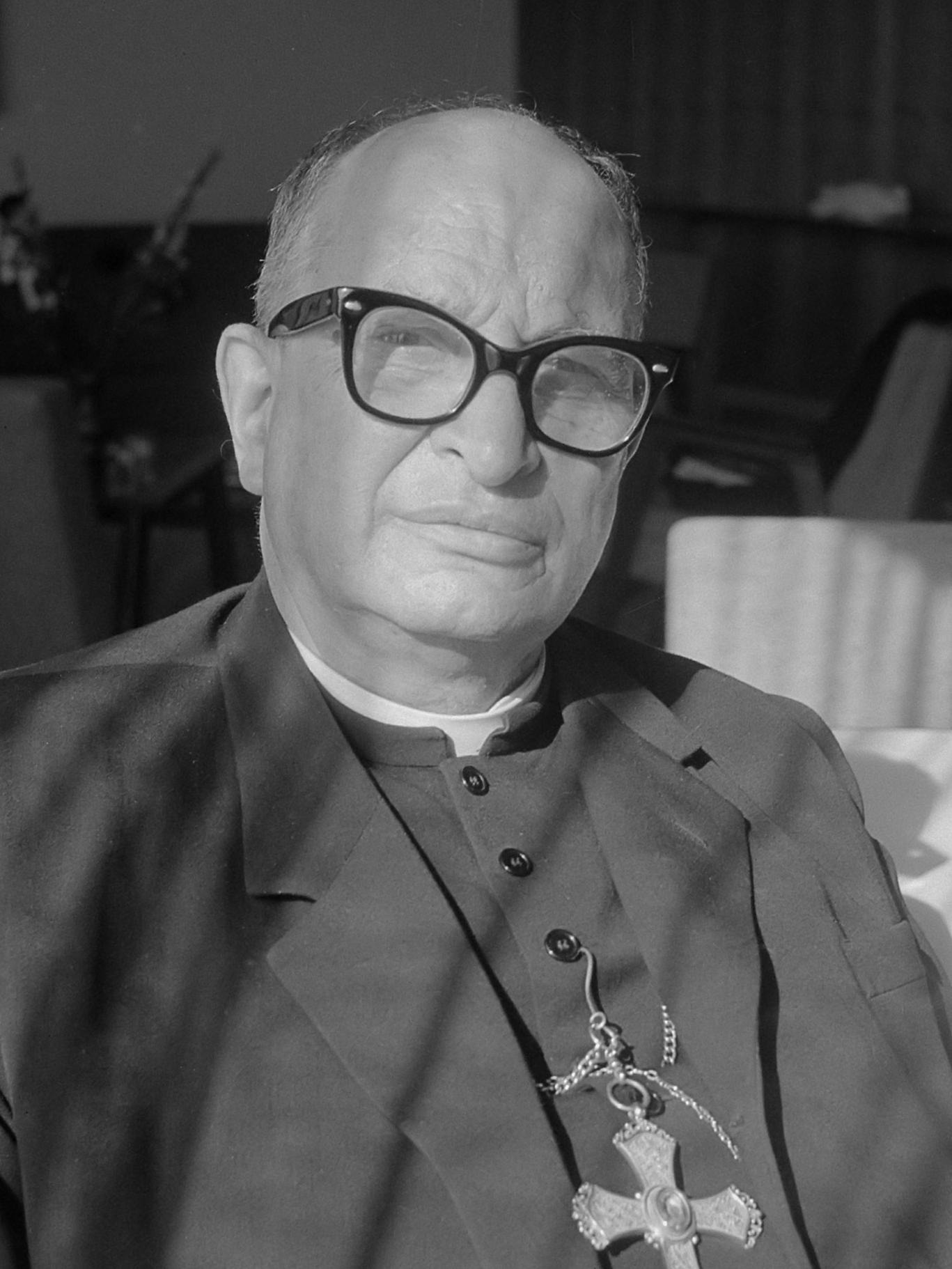
- The cardinal pictured on 30 June 1961.
- Church: Catholic Church
- Archdiocese: Guadalajara
- Appointed: 18 February 1936
- Term ended: 1 March 1969
- Predecessor: José Francisco Orozco y Jiménez
- Successor: José Salazar López
- Other post: Cardinal-Priest of Sant'Onofrio (1958-72)
- Previous posts: Titular Bishop of Rhosus (1929-34); Auxiliary Bishop of Guadalajara (1929-34); Titular Archbishop of Bizya (1934-36); Coadjutor Archbishop of Guadalajara (1934-36); President of the Mexican Bishops' Conference (1960-63)

Orders
- Ordination: 25 February 1912 by José de Jesús Ortíz y Rodríguez
- Consecration: 7 May 1930 by José Francisco Orozco y Jiménez
- Created cardinal: 15 December 1958 by John XXIII
- Rank: Cardinal-Priest

Personal details
- Born: José Mariano Garibi y Rivera; 30 January 1889 Guadalajara, Mexico
- Died: 27 May 1972 (aged 83) Hospital de la Santísima Trinidad, Guadalajara, Mexico
- Buried: Guadalajara Cathedral
- Parents: Miguel Garibi y Reyes; Joaquina Rivera y Robledo
- Education: Pontifical Gregorian University; Pontifical Latin American College
- Motto: Diligite alterutrum

Styles of José Garibi y Rivera
- Reference style: His Eminence
- Spoken style: Your Eminence
- Informal style: Cardinal
- See: Guadalajara (emeritus)

José Mariano Garibi y Rivera (30 January 1889 in Guadalajara – 27 May 1972 in Guadalajara), was a cardinal and Archbishop of Guadalajara. He was the first Mexican cardinal of the Catholic Church.

== Education ==
Garibi was educated at the Colegio del Señor San José (primary education) and the Seminary of Guadalajara from 1900 to 1906, where he studied the humanities, sciences, Latin, Greek, philosophy and theology. He entered the novitiate of the Order of Friars Minor at Zapopan, Jalisco, in 1906, but left at the end of the novitiate year after he decided not to join the Order. He then returned to the Seminary of Guadalajara to pursue studies for the priesthood. He was named professor of Latin at the Seminary of Guadalajara in 1911, and occupied the post until 26 August 1913. He then went to Rome to study at the Pontifical Gregorian University from October 1913 to July 1916, where he earned a doctorate of theology and a licentiate in canon law. For the next ten years, he served in a number of pastoral and professorial posts.

== Episcopate ==
In 1929 the Archbishop of Guadalajara, José Francisco Orozco y Jiménez, was expelled from the country during the course of the government's attempt to suppress the Catholic Church. Garibi accompanied him into exile in the United States. While on a visit to Rome, he was appointed the titular bishop of Roso and the auxiliary bishop of the Archdiocese of Guadalajara on 16 December 1929. He and the archbishop were allowed to return to Mexico the following March, and he was consecrated on 7 May 1930, by the archbishop. He was appointed as Vicar general of the archdiocese on 1 January 1933. He was promoted to titular archbishop of Bizia and became the coadjutor bishop of Guadalajara. He succeeded to the metropolitan see of Guadalajara on 18 February 1936. He was elected as President of the Mexican Episcopal Conference for six consecutive terms.

== Cardinal ==
Garibi was made a Cardinal Priest, with the titular church of San Onofrio in the consistory of 15 December 1958 by Pope John XXIII. He participated in the conclave of 1963 that elected Pope Paul VI.

Garibi resigned as archbishop on 1 March 1969. He died on 27 May 1972, of a pulmonary edema, and was buried in the crypt of Guadalajara Cathedral.
