= Diocesan Sanctuary of Our Lady of Guadalupe =

Catholic cathedral in Zamora, Michoacán, Mexico

- Santuario de Nuestra Señora de Guadalupe (Spanish)
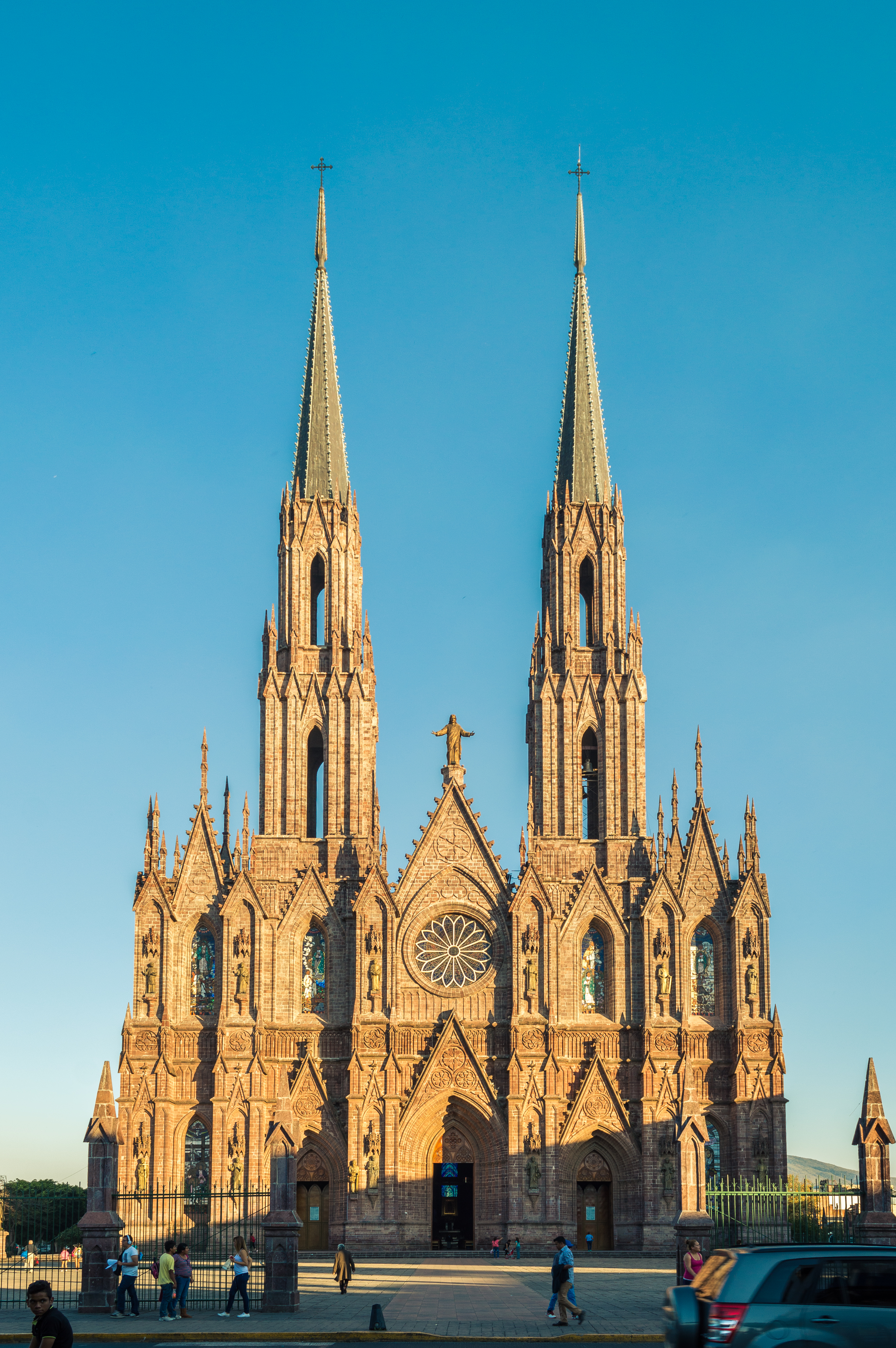
- Sanctuary of Our Lady of Guadalupe in June 2008

Religion
- Affiliation: Catholic Church

Location
- Location: Michoacán, Mexico
- Interactive map of Diocesan Sanctuary of Our Lady of Guadalupe
- Coordinates: 19°59′01.13″N 102°16′50.95″W

Architecture
- Type: Church

The Sanctuary of Our Lady of Guadalupe (Spanish: Santuario de Nuestra Señora de Guadalupe) is a Gothic revival Catholic cathedral located in Zamora, Michoacán, Mexico. The towers reach a height of 107.5 meters, making it the tallest church building in Mexico.

== History ==
The cornerstone of the cathedral was laid on February 2, 1898, the feast of Candlemas, by the second bishop of Zamora, Don Jose Ma. Càzares y Martinez. The architectural plan is attributed to the Zamoran architect Jesús Hernández Segura. The diocese had been established in 1862 and needed a cathedral.

== Beginning ==
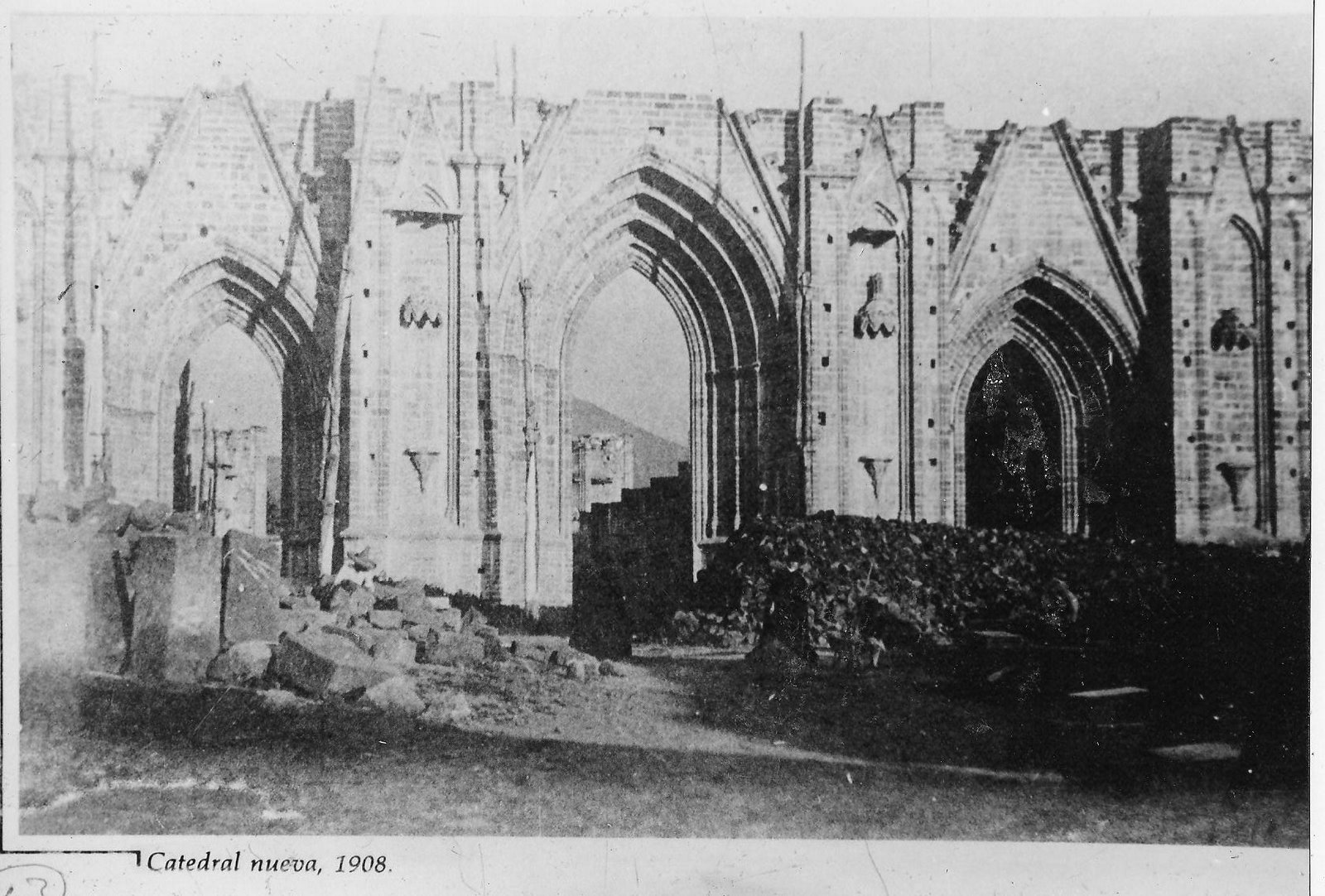
Start of construction in 1900

Construction started in 1898, with a crew of more than 300 men working on the site. It was designed in the Gothic Revival style with an unusual twist, a dome over the crossing. The cathedral would contain five extensive naves, four of which had been roofed over by the end of 1910; vast amounts of quarry stone were required in order to accelerate the work.

== Abandonment ==
The Mexican Revolution brought problems to Zamora, and to the country as a whole. In 1914 the work of construction was suspended due to the revolution and later, the Cristero War, for an indefinite time.

During the intervening years, only half of the cathedral was complete, including four of the naves, and all the pillars were in place. Unfortunately, due to the continuing conflict, the original drafts were lost; all that remained were a drawing of the original facade and a general plan of construction. Also, much of the original quarry stone disappeared, and the cathedral was damaged when the army decided to use one of the stone walls as a place of execution; many died by firing squad for their faith. The evidence still exists in the form of hundreds of bullet holes etched in the wall; a silent memorial to those who died there.

== Reconstruction ==
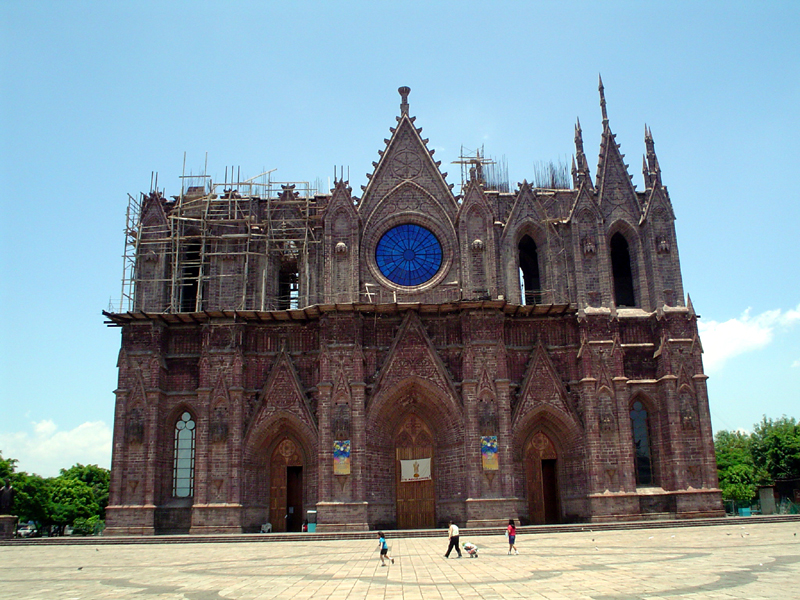
Unfinished facade in 2004

After many fits and starts, in 1988 Josè E. Jiménez Robles, eighth bishop of Zamora, was able to plan for restarting construction and in 1989, it was decided to dedicate the building to Our Lady of Guadalupe. Its completion seemed almost impossible to him; the lack of economic resources and the time needed to complete the project being the most daunting tasks.

The work of reconstruction began in 1990, with a new facade instead of what was originally planned, and bearing a resemblance to the gothic cathedral in Milan. A spire was placed at the crossing instead of the planned dome, this being an element more in keeping with pure gothic architecture. The walls were cleaned of debris then cracks were repaired and the walls reinforced. The towers were redesigned to make them more spacious and the patio was paved in order to lend greater stability to the building.

== Present day ==
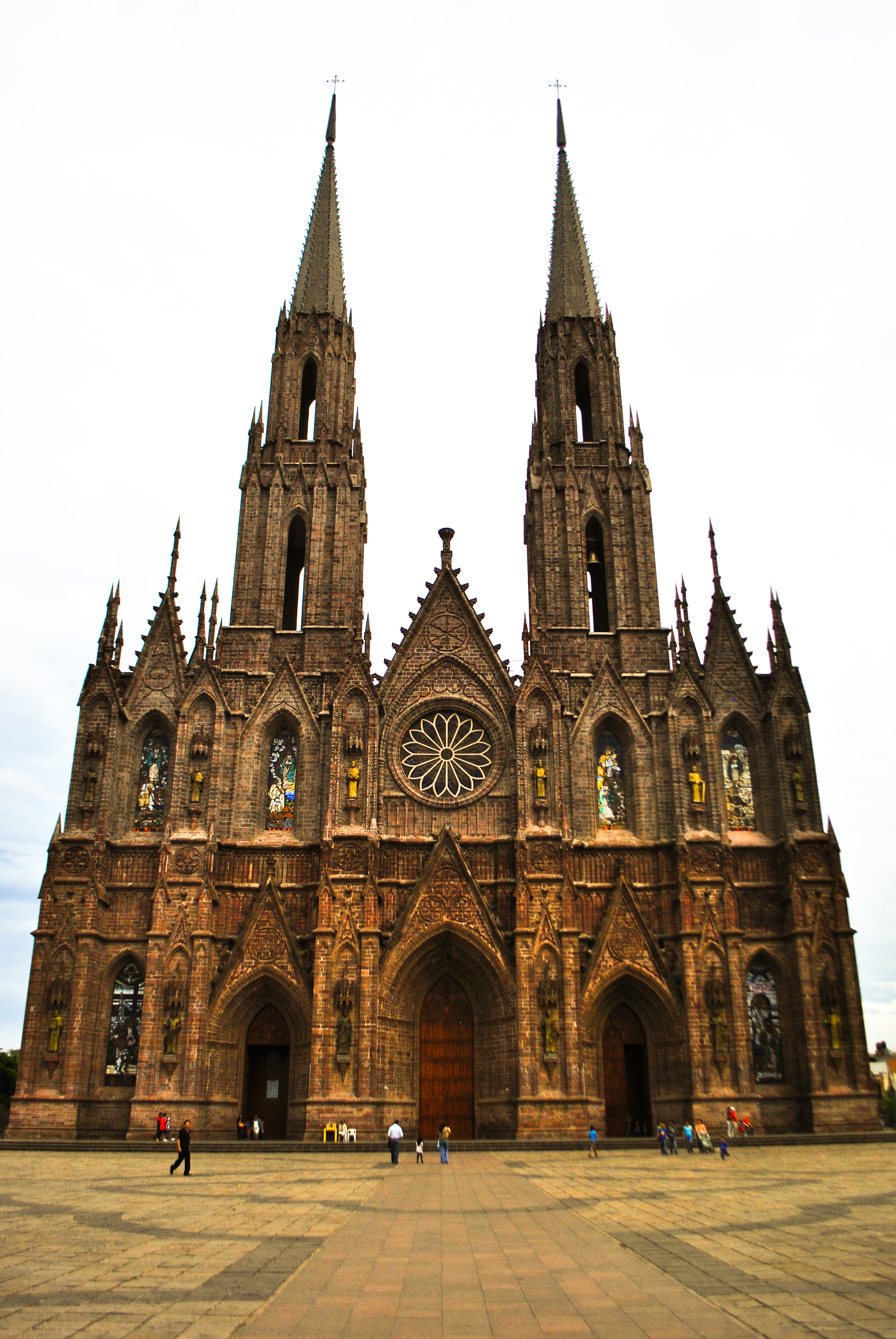
Facade and atrium

At the moment, construction is on the verge of completion and last details are being finished. The Pipe organ, by Alexander Schuke Potsdam Orgelbau, is complete and was installed early in 2009. With the newly installed spires, the towers now reach a height of 107.5 meters. The inner illumination is completely finished and in niches on the pillars, images of the saints have been placed, with plaques with their respective names underneath.

== Gallery ==
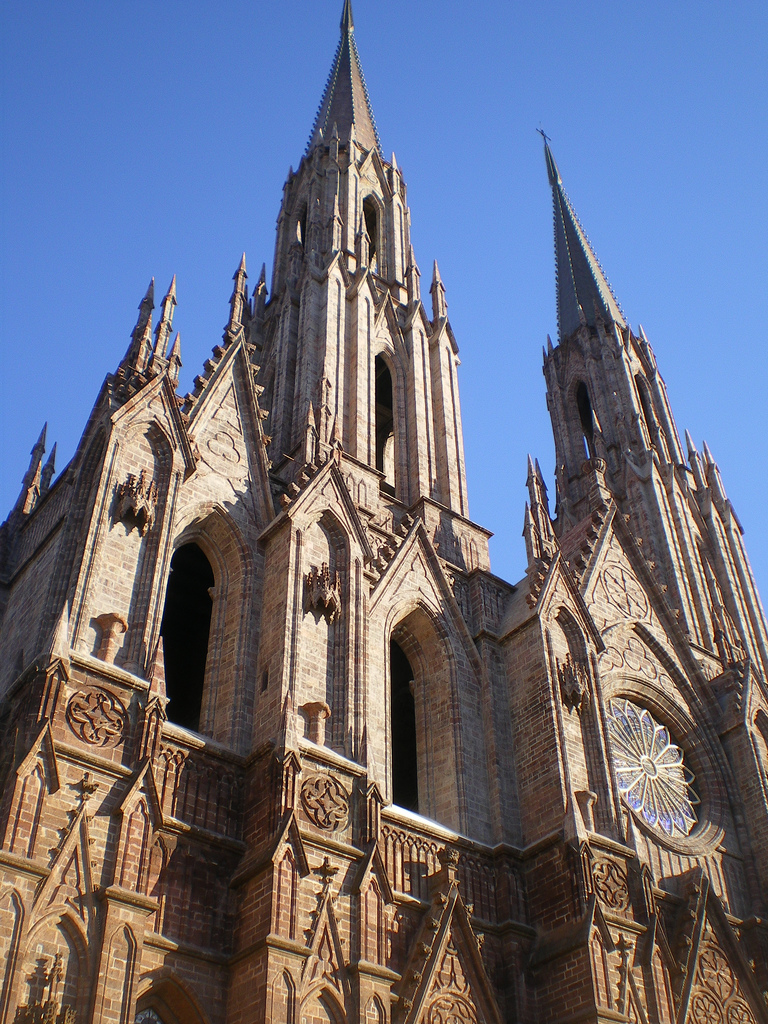
105 m high towers

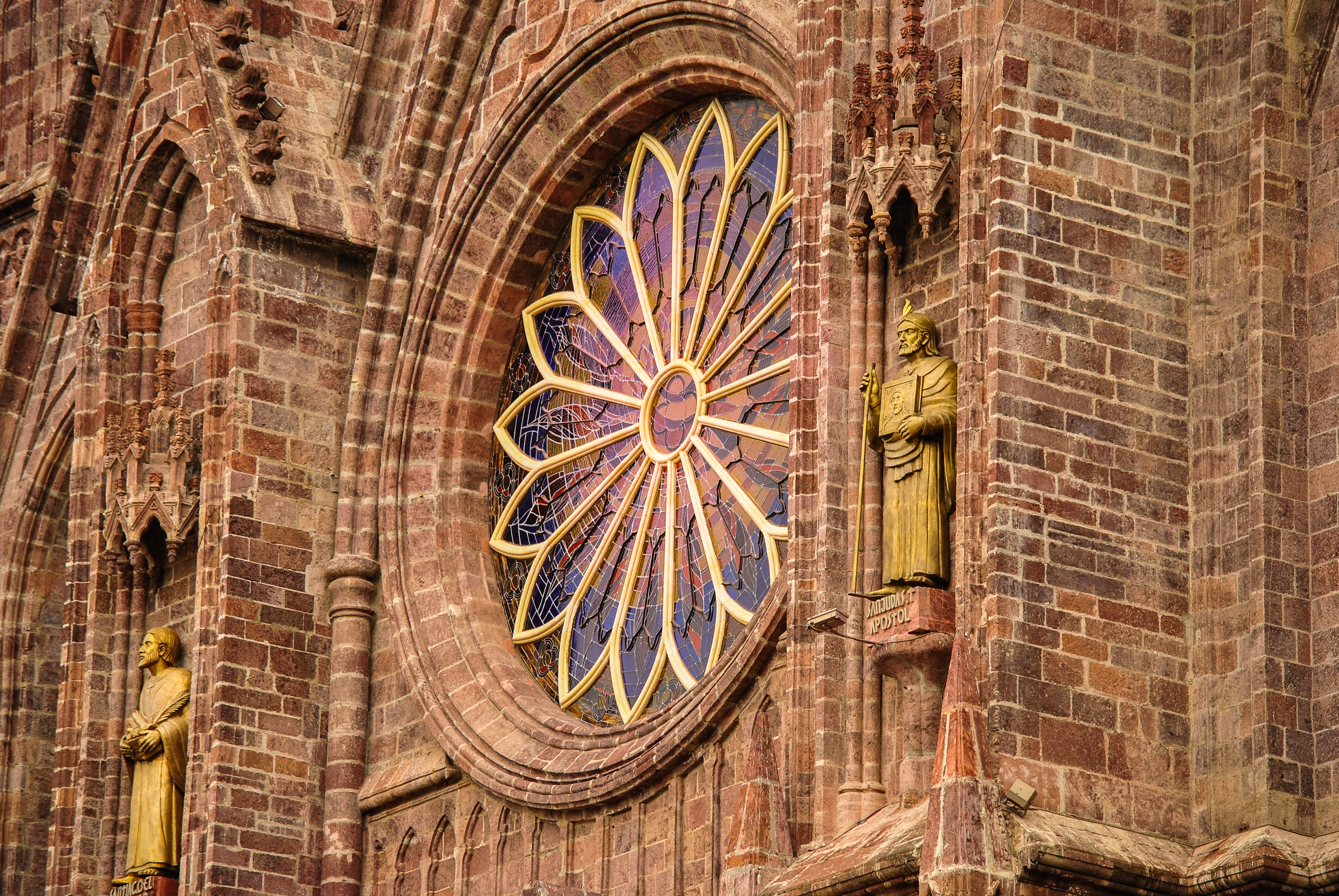
Rose window and statues of saints

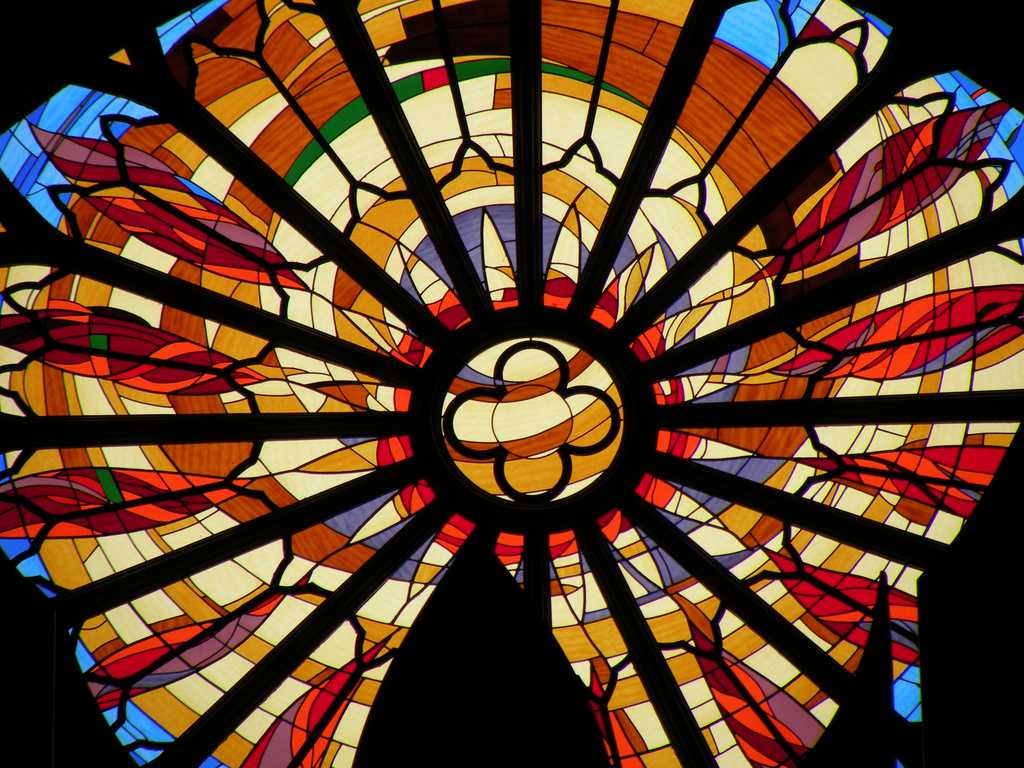
Rose window design

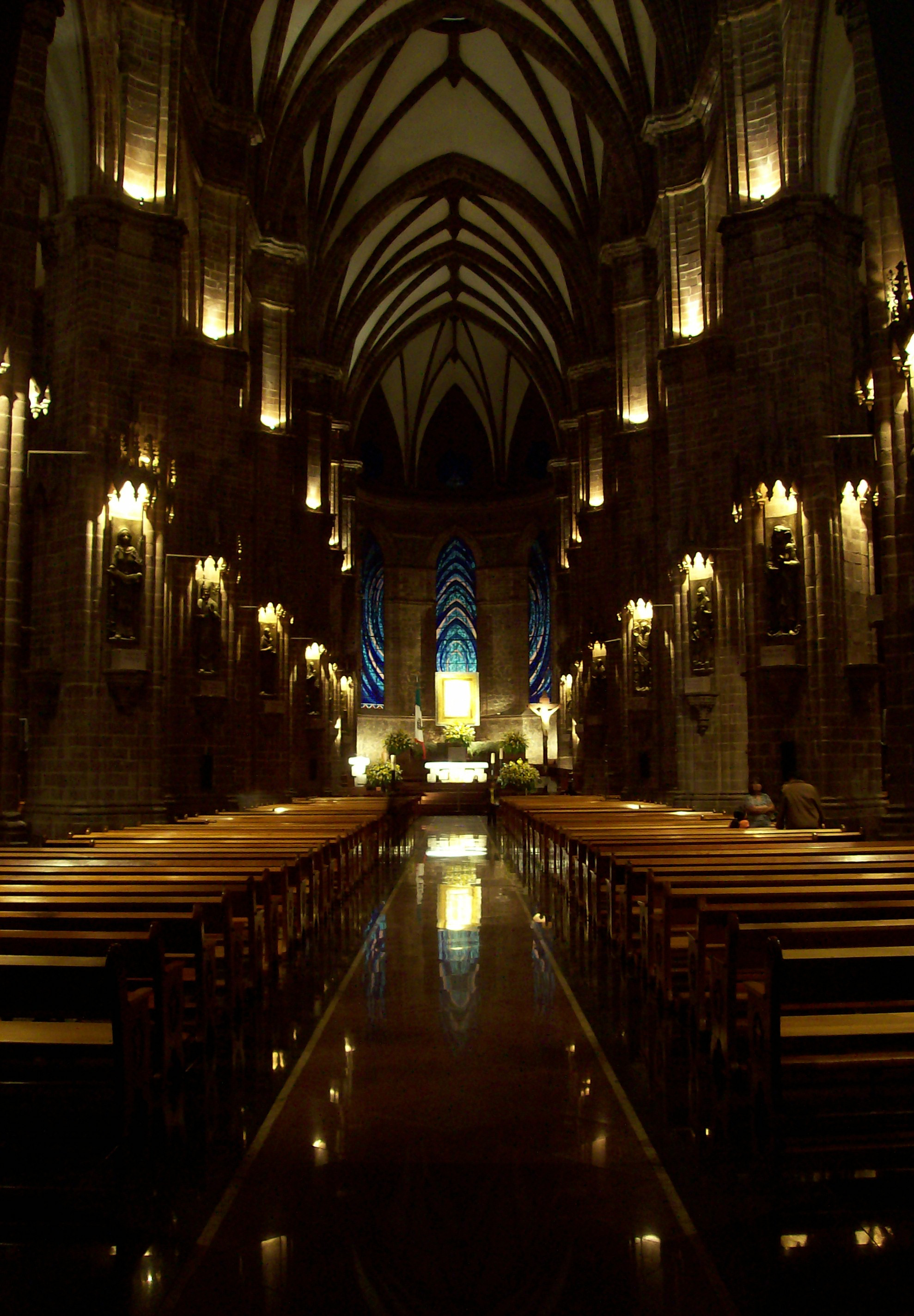
Central nave

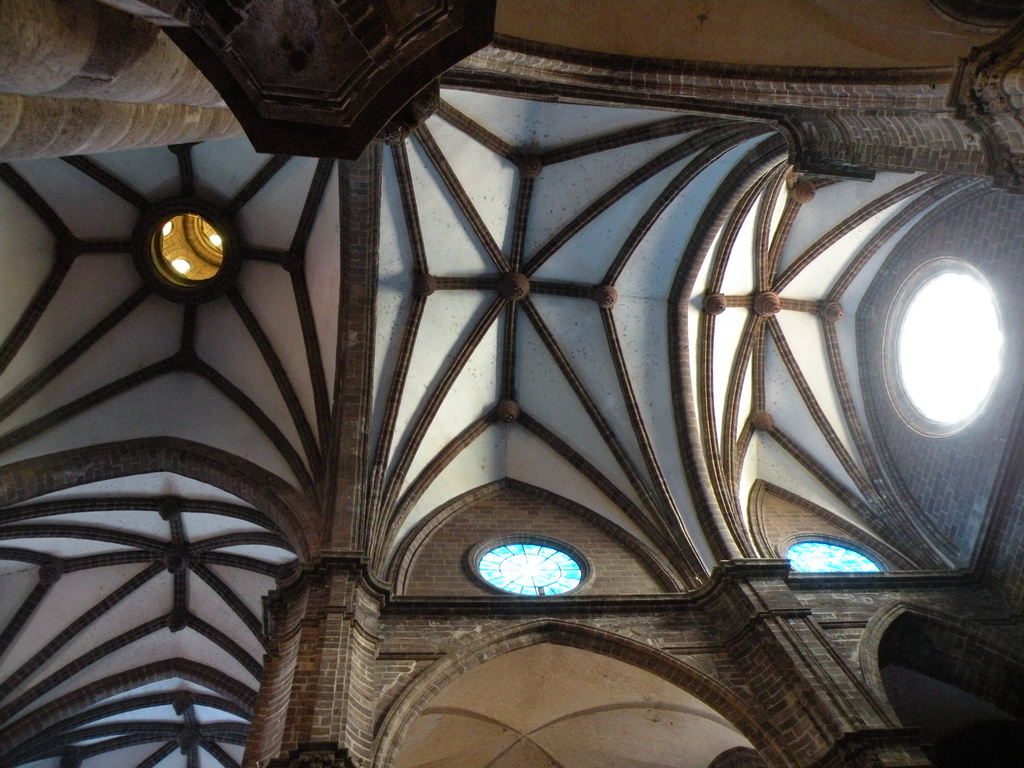
Vaults of the central nave

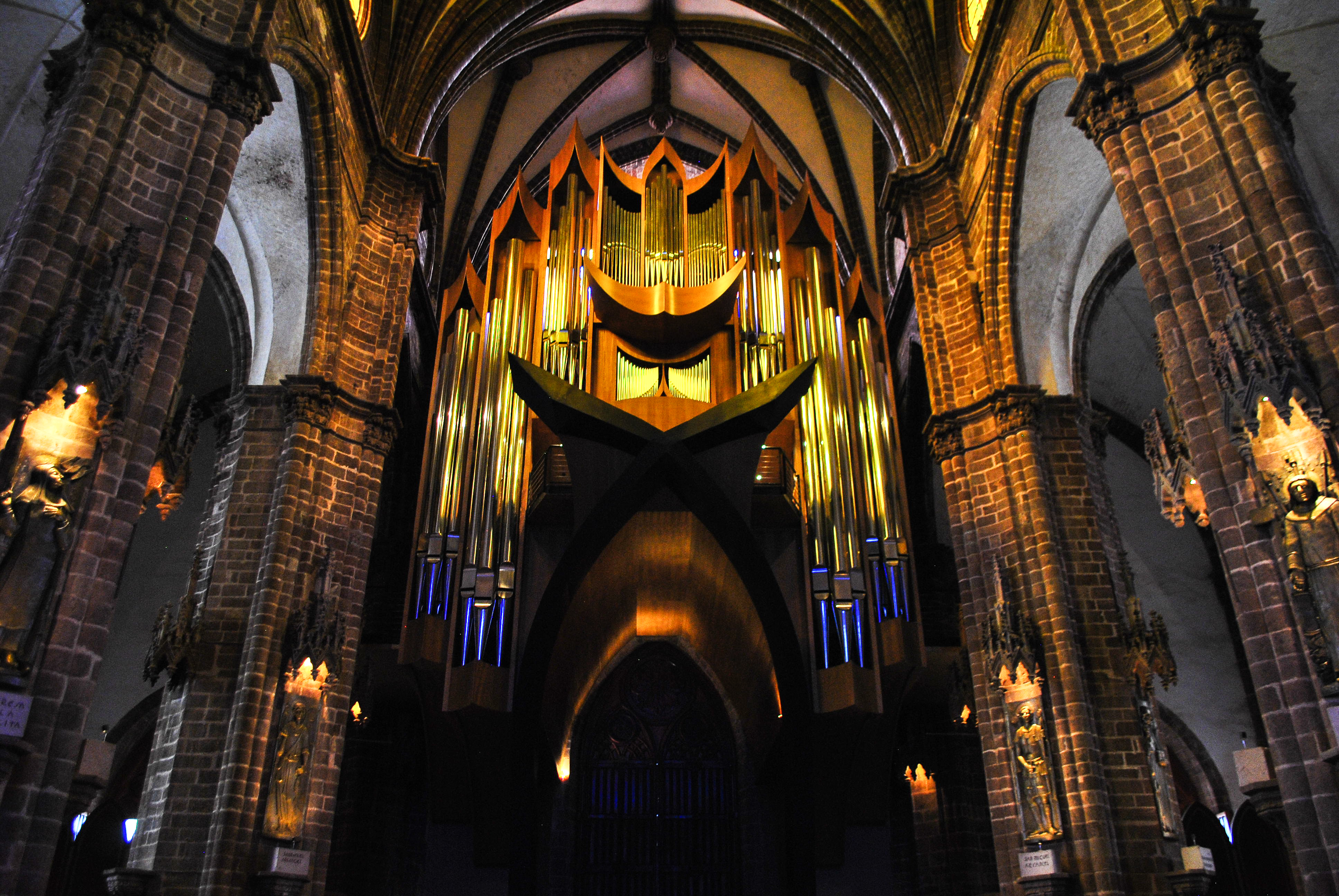
Organ

== See also ==
- List of churches under the patronage of Our Lady of Guadalupe
