= FC Satélites =

Mexican football club

Satélites
- Full name: Fútbol Club Satélites
- Nickname(s): Los Satélites (The Satellites)
- Founded: 2015; 10 years ago
- Dissolved: 2018; 7 years ago
- Ground: Estadio Primero de Mayo, Tulancingo, Hidalgo, Mexico
- Capacity: 2,500
- Owner: Daniel Antonio Duarte
- Chairman: Daniel Antonio Duarte
- League: Liga Premier - Serie B
- 2018–19: Preseason
Home colours

The Fútbol Club Satélites, commonly known as Satélites, was a Mexican football club based in Tulancingo. The club was founded in 1995, and played in the Serie B of Liga Premier.

== Players ==
=== Current squad ===
Note: Flags indicate national team as defined under FIFA eligibility rules; some limited exceptions apply. Players may hold more than one non-FIFA nationality.

No. / Pos. / Nation / Player	No. / Pos. / Nation / Player
