= Zamora, Michoacán =

Zamora de Hidalgo, Michoacán
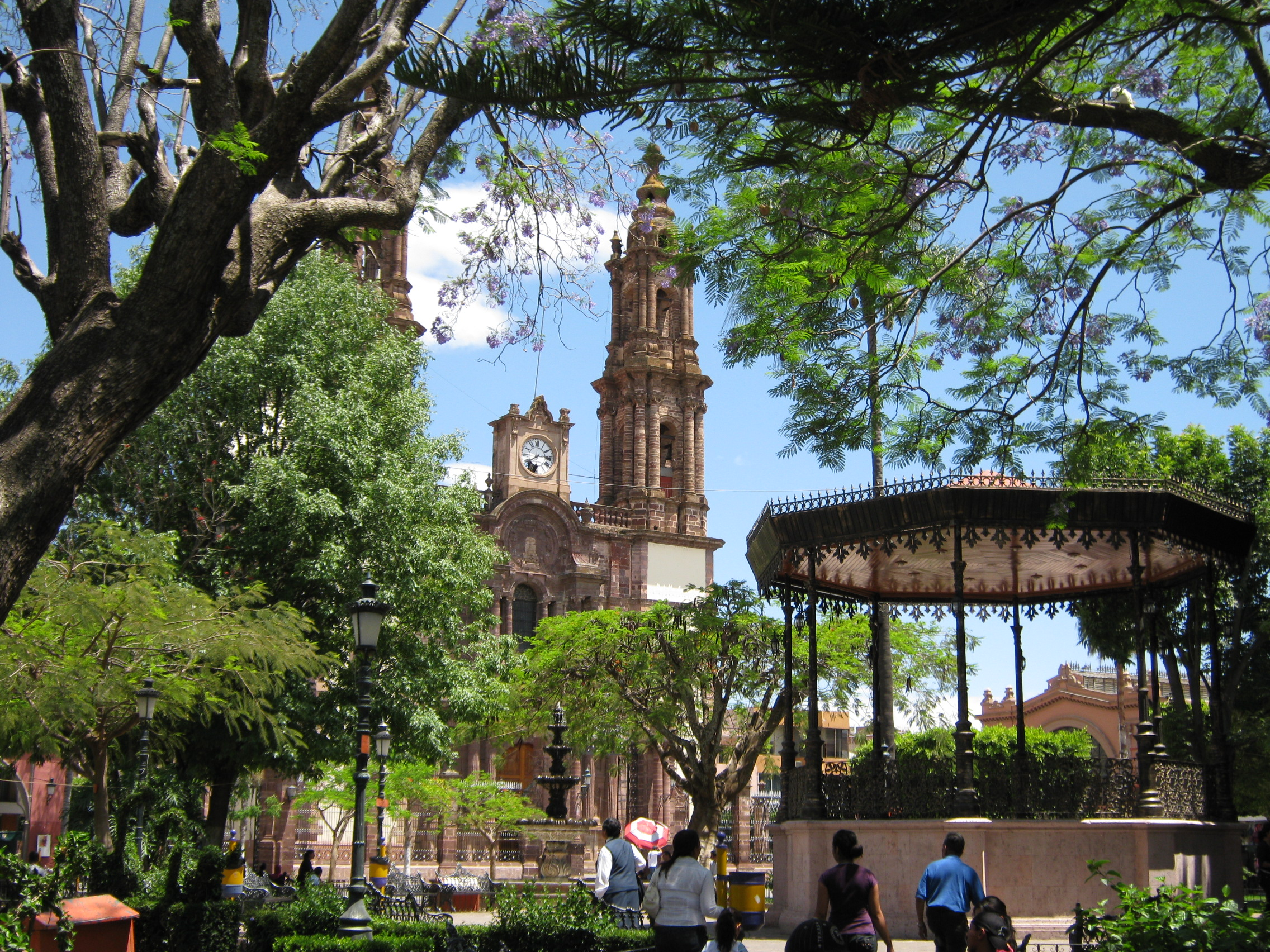
- Plaza de Armas of Zamora

- Coat of arms
- Motto: Cradle of Illustrious Men
- Location within Michoacán Location within Mexico
- Coordinates: 19°59′N 102°17′W
- Country: Mexico
- State: Michoacán
- Municipality: Zamora
- Foundation: 18 January 1574; 452 years ago
- Founder: Martín Enríquez de Almanza
- Named for: Zamora, Spain

Government
  - Mayor: Carlos Alberto Soto Delgado

Area
  - City: 20.6 km^{2} (8.0 sq mi)
- Elevation: 1,580 m (5,180 ft)

Population (2020)
  - City: 186,102
  - Density: 9,030/km^{2} (23,400/sq mi)
  - Metro: 273,641
- Time zone: UTC-6 (Central Standard Time)
- Zip code: 59600–59725
- Website: http://www.zamora.gob.mx

Zamora de Hidalgo (Spanish pronunciation: [saˈmoɾa de iˈdalɢo]) is a city in the Mexican state of Michoacán. The 2010 census population was 141,627, making it the third largest city in the state. The city is the municipal seat of Zamora Municipality, which has an area of 330.97 km^{2} (127.79 sq mi) and includes many other smaller communities, the largest of which is Ario de Rayón (formerly known as Ario de Santa Mónica). The municipality's population is around 186,102, which makes it the second most populous urban area in the state.

The city of Zamora is an important economic center in the state and the most significant population center between the cities of Morelia and Guadalajara. The city is located on the Tarascan Plateau in the northwestern part of the state, at an elevation of 1,567 m (5,141 ft) above sea level. Zamora is surrounded by the fertile Tziróndaro Valley which is an important agricultural area that exports large amounts of produce to the United States.

== Toponymy ==
The city was named after the Spanish city of Zamora because the first European settlers to the area were predominantly from the Spanish province of Castilla y León. Zamora is of Iberian origins that can be traced to the Latin "Civitas Murata" meaning "The Walled City" because it is surrounded by high hills. In 1953, the city officially added "de Hidalgo" to honor Miguel Hidalgo y Costilla who declared the village a city during the movement to independence in Mexico.

== History ==
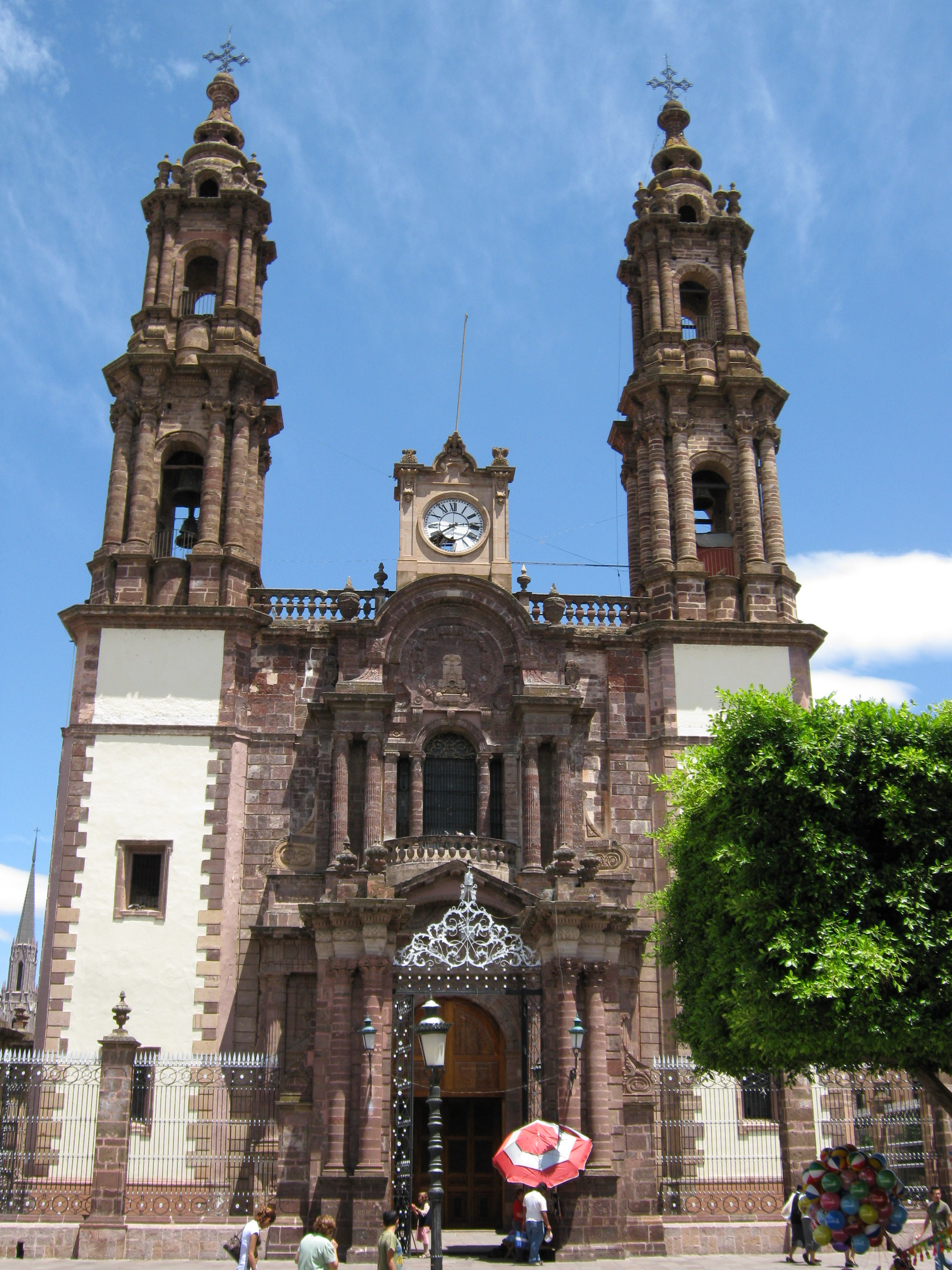
Cathedral of Zamora from the Spanish Colonial Era in the historic district, Plaza de Armas.

Evidence shows the area was first settled around 1500 BC. During the Pre-Columbian Period there were several waves of migrations into the area by surrounding tribes: Pirinda, Nahua, Huetamo, Colima, and Purépecha. Zamora sits in the Tziróndaro Valley which means "swamp place" in the Purépecha language.

The village of Zamora was founded on January 18, 1574, on the orders of Viceroy Martín Enríquez de Almanza, by Spanish settlers from the Spanish city of Zamora. The Spanish were attracted to the area because of fertile valleys in the region that were well suited for agricultural development.

Zamora was awarded city status by the Constituent Congress in 1825, ratifying a decision made on November 21, 1810 by the Mexican War of Independence revolutionary leader Miguel Hidalgo y Costilla. During the 19th century, Zamora developed into a great cultural and economic center due to high agricultural productivity and flourishing commerce. On December 10, 1831, Zamora was declared the municipal seat. Later the city's elite began a political movement to create a new state in which Zamora would be the state capital. In 1846, Archbishop Pelagio Antonio de Labastida y Dávalos initiated a clerical separation from Mexico City. By 1862 a new ecclesiastical office was founded, Dioceses of Zamora based in Zamora. The political aspirations to separate from the rest of the state were impeded.

During the Porfiriato the city experienced the fastest economic growth in its history. Between 1854 and 1910, the city experienced rapid economic growth due industrial development, city modernization, technological innovations, and increased agricultural productivity. Zamora was one of the first cities in the state that implemented new technologies like: railroad stations, telegraphs, telephones, electricity, modern water systems. In 1899 the department of transportation connected Zamora by railroad to other important populations centers in central Mexico. At the same time the department of urbanization had an image they wanted for the city which involved many modernization projects throughout the city. During the Porfiriato the city had an architectural renaissance celebrating many vogue European architectural styles. Large civil offices and religious temples were erected during this time that flaunted the economic wealth of the city like: Michoacán Center for the Arts, College of Michoacán, and Obrero de Zamora Theatre. On February 2, 1898 at the feast of Candlemas led by the second bishop of Zamora, Don Jose Ma. Càzares y Martinez the cornerstone of the Cathedral of Our Lady of Guadalupe was laid. During this time many of the city's elite built new homes largely inspired by Victorian and Châteauesque architectural styles.

The Mexican Revolution reached the state in 1911, when those loyal to Francisco I. Madero proclaimed the city and surrounding area their territory. When the state governor resigned the city would continue to be involved in the war. In 1918 the state ratified the state constitution. After the Mexican Revolution, the Cristero War continued to devastate the region's agriculture which had detrimental economic effects to the city. Political hostilities would finally end in the city and vicinity in 1926.

== Geography ==
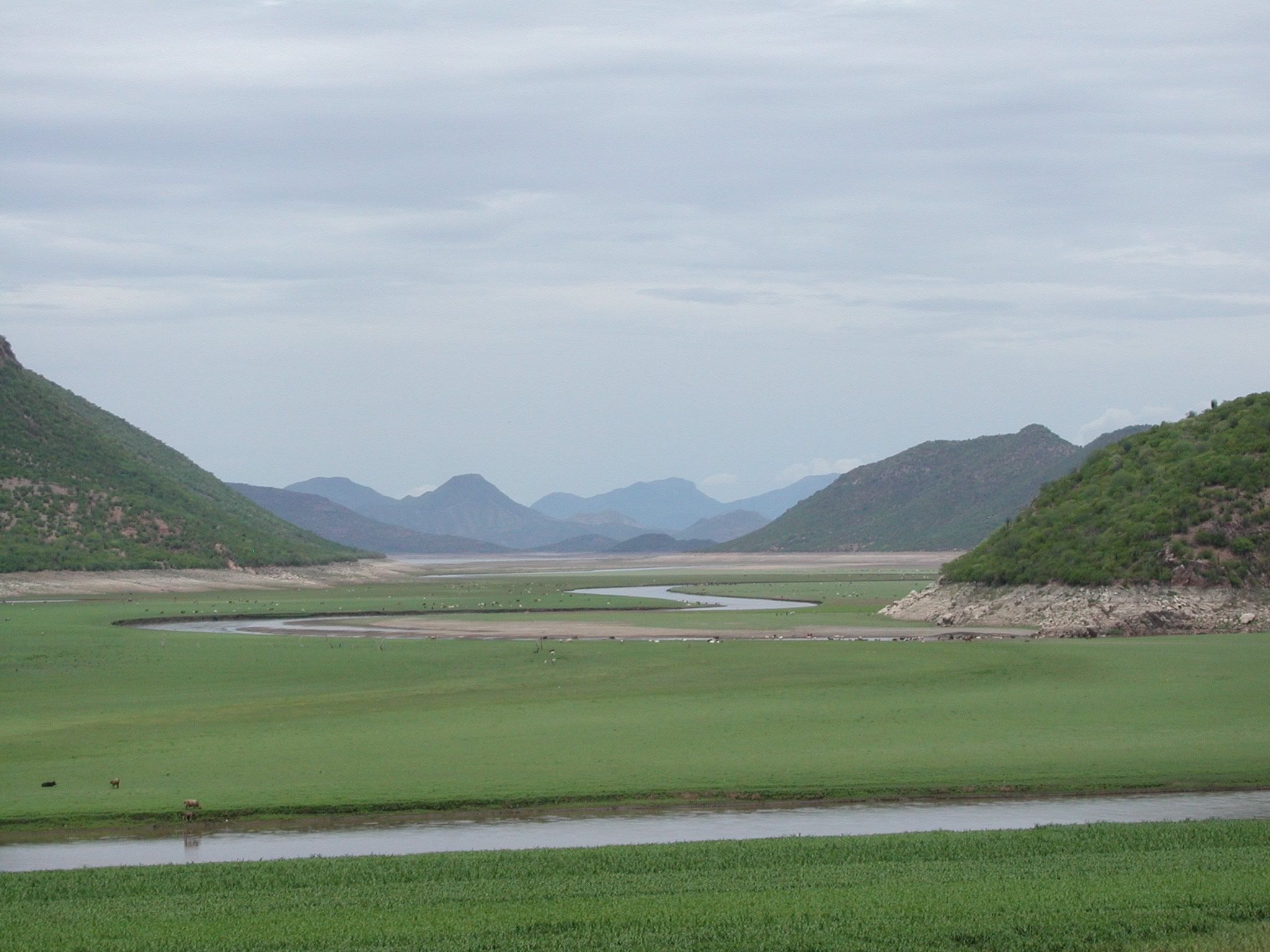
Tziróndaro Valley

Zamora de Hidalgo is located in the northwestern part of the state of Michoacán on the Tarascan Plateau at an elevation of 1,567 m 5,141 ft) above sea level. The city is the municipal seat of Zamora Municipality, which has an area of 330.97 km^{2} (127.79 sq mi) and includes many other smaller communities, the largest of which is Ario de Rayón (Ario Santa Mónica).

More specifically the city is found in Tziróndaro Valley (Purépecha for "Swamp place"), a large alluvial plain surrounded by mountains with a northeast-southeast orientation. The topography of the region is flat with no slopes greater than 5%. During the Cenozoic the area was a flood plain of the Duero River which deposited large amounts of basalt, breccia, calcareous tuff, tuff, andesite, and rhyolite. The dominant basalt rock found in the area give the soil a rich source of: calcium, magnesium, iron, potassium, and sodium. The soils in the surrounding areas are rich and fertile making the region perfect for agriculture. The soil in the area is classified as pellic vertisol with significant amounts of chromate; the soil is of fine texture with rocky layer containing rocks smaller than 7.5 cm^{3}.

=== Climate ===
The city has a humid subtropical climate (Cwa) with average annual temperature of 18.5 °C (65 °F). The warmest month is May with an average temperature of 23.3 °C (74 °F), and the coldest month is December with an average temperature of 14.7 °C (59 °F). The city has an average annual precipitation of about 900.6 mm (35.4 in) mostly falling during the summer.

Climate data for Zamora de Hidalgo, Michoacán
Month	Jan	Feb	Mar	Apr	May	Jun	Jul	Aug	Sep	Oct	Nov	Dec	Year
Record high °C (°F)	34.1 (93.4)	35.8 (96.4)	38.4 (101.1)	39.0 (102.2)	48.1 (118.6)	40.2 (104.4)	37.0 (98.6)	38.0 (100.4)	37.9 (100.2)	37.8 (100.0)	36.0 (96.8)	35.3 (95.5)	48.1 (118.6)
Mean daily maximum °C (°F)	27.4 (81.3)	29.2 (84.6)	31.6 (88.9)	33.4 (92.1)	34.3 (93.7)	32.1 (89.8)	29.6 (85.3)	29.7 (85.5)	29.7 (85.5)	29.6 (85.3)	29.1 (84.4)	27.5 (81.5)	30.3 (86.5)
Daily mean °C (°F)	17.5 (63.5)	19.0 (66.2)	21.4 (70.5)	23.4 (74.1)	24.9 (76.8)	24.3 (75.7)	22.7 (72.9)	22.6 (72.7)	22.5 (72.5)	21.3 (70.3)	19.8 (67.6)	18.2 (64.8)	21.5 (70.7)
Mean daily minimum °C (°F)	7.7 (45.9)	8.8 (47.8)	11.1 (52.0)	13.4 (56.1)	15.5 (59.9)	16.5 (61.7)	15.7 (60.3)	15.6 (60.1)	15.2 (59.4)	13.0 (55.4)	10.5 (50.9)	8.9 (48.0)	12.7 (54.9)
Record low °C (°F)	−3.0 (26.6)	−1.0 (30.2)	3.0 (37.4)	6.0 (42.8)	8.0 (46.4)	5.8 (42.4)	0.0 (32.0)	6.2 (43.2)	9.8 (49.6)	6.5 (43.7)	2.0 (35.6)	0.2 (32.4)	−3.0 (26.6)
Average precipitation mm (inches)	15.9 (0.63)	4.6 (0.18)	5.6 (0.22)	13.0 (0.51)	40.7 (1.60)	150.2 (5.91)	213.6 (8.41)	175.4 (6.91)	153.7 (6.05)	52.1 (2.05)	15.8 (0.62)	16.7 (0.66)	857.3 (33.75)
Average precipitation days (≥ 0.1 mm)	1.9	1.4	1.4	2.3	5.6	16.2	21.4	20.8	15.3	6.8	2.0	2.8	97.9
Average relative humidity (%)	55	52	49	47	49	64	72	71	70	64	61	58	59
Mean monthly sunshine hours	235	227	246	236	239	188	163	198	171	211	233	223	2,570
Source 1: Servicio Meteorológico Nacional
Source 2: Deutscher Wetterdienst (sun, 1961–1990) (Note: Station ID for Zamora is 76662 Use this station ID to locate the sunshine duration)

== Education ==
Universities

Zamora has six institutes of higher education:

- Centro de Estudios Universitarios Veracruz “Univer”.
- Instituto Tecnológico de Estudios Superiores de Zamora
- Universidad de Zamora
- Universidad del Valle de Atemajac
- UPN Unidad 162 Zamora
- Colegio de Michoacán.
- UMSNH Facultad de Medicina "Dr. Ignacio Chavez" Extension Zamora

== Tourism ==
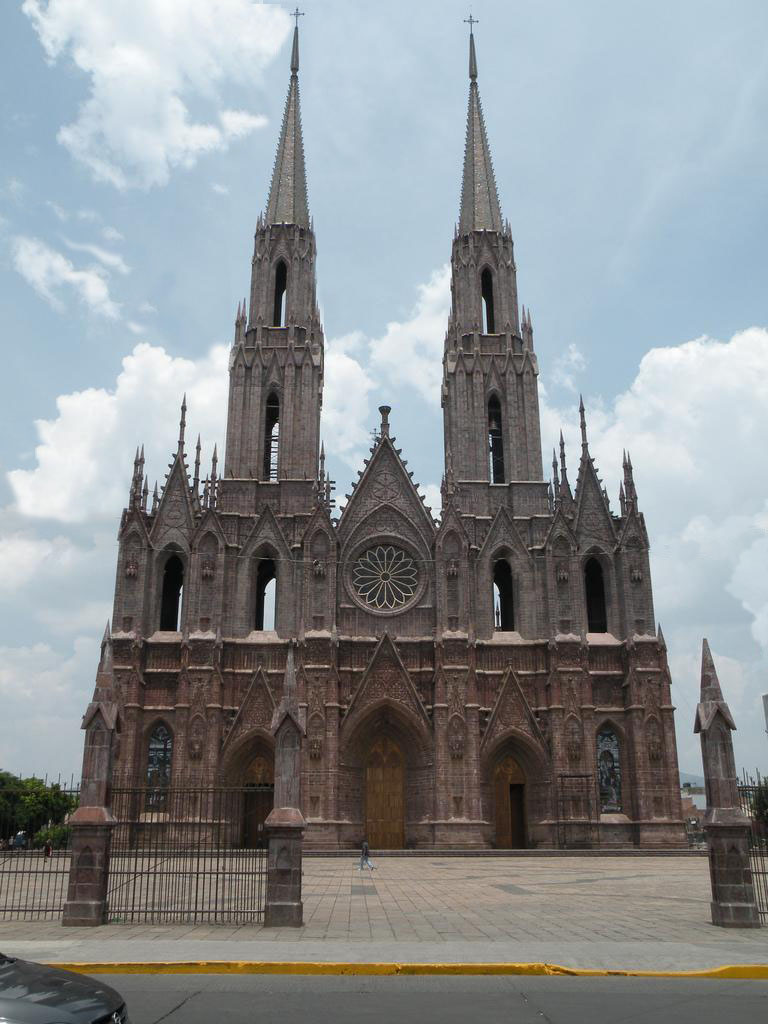
Cathedral of Our Lady of Guadalupe

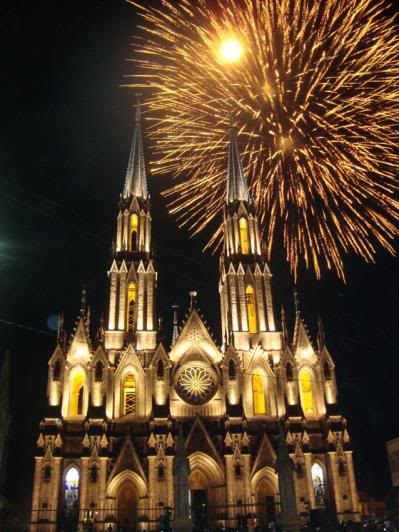
Cathedral of Our Lady of Guadalupe at night.

A number of historic buildings dot the city center, built during Spanish colonial times (virreinato) and the 19th century. Some of these monuments are the Temple of San Francisco, the Cathedral of Our Lady of Guadalupe (tallest cathedral in México); the church of San Francisco, the church of El Calvario, the Morelos Market, and the Federal Palace.

One of the main tourist attractions is the Cathedral of Our Lady of Guadalupe, located on 5 de Mayo Avenue; it is a neo-gothic style architectural cathedral which its construction began on February 2, 1898, this cathedral reaches 107.5 meters in height (352.69 ft.), 95 meters long (311.67 ft.), 57 meters wide (187 ft.), and a total surface area of 5,415 square meters (58,286.57 sq. ft.), making it one of the largest cathedrals of its kind in the American continent. There is also the Cathedral of the Immaculate Conception.

Zamora has several leisure alternatives, periodically Theater of the City of Zamora offers events, as piano recitals, theater, camera concerts and works, also the School of Michoacán A.C. with soothes in Zamora offers to the citizenship diverse cultural events like cycles of films festivals, recitals, concerts and presentations of folkloric dances and events.

Every year in December the Festival of the Chongos zamoranos is held, where the visitor is able to taste gastronomical samples, musical dances and interpretations, as well as the “Poets Meeting” and every 12 of December in Cathedral of Our Lady of Guadalupe and in diverse places of the city. One of nearby best attractions is the Lago de Camécuaro National Park, which is one out of 5 national parks.

== Notable people ==
Policy and diplomacy

- José Sixto Verduzco, insurgent leader during the War of Independence, senator for Michoacán.
- Alfonso García Robles, Nobel Peace Prize (1982), and Secretary of Foreign Affairs.
- Marta Sahagún, wife of ex president Vicente Fox.
- Juan Razon, Singer, television host, radio personality also known as "El Hombre del Vozarrón" or Don Cheto.

Arts and culture

- Eduardo del Río, writer and cartoonist.

Sports

- Rafael Márquez, football player of Atlas F.C. and FC Barcelona.
- Ricardo Rodriguez, former WWE wrestler and personal ring announcer for Alberto Del Rio. His family is from Zamora.
- Juan Carlos Chávez, former football player.
- Luis Ángel Landín, football player of Municipal Pérez Zeledón.
- Luis Ángel Malagon, football player of Club América
