= 5th federal electoral district of Michoacán =

Federal electoral district of Mexico

Michoacán's 5th
- Electoral district of the Chamber of Deputies of Mexico

- 5th district since 2023

Incumbent
- Member: Delhi Miroslava Shember
- Party: ▌Morena
- Congress: 66th (2024–2027)

District
- State: Michoacán
- Head town: Zamora de Hidalgo
- Coordinates: 19°59′N 102°17′W
- Covers: 12 municipalities: Churintzio, Ecuandureo, Ixtlán, Numarán, Penjamillo, La Piedad, Purépero, Tanhuato, Tlazazalca, Yurécuaro, Zamora, Zináparo
- PR region: Fifth
- Precincts: 281
- Population: 441,653 (2020 census)

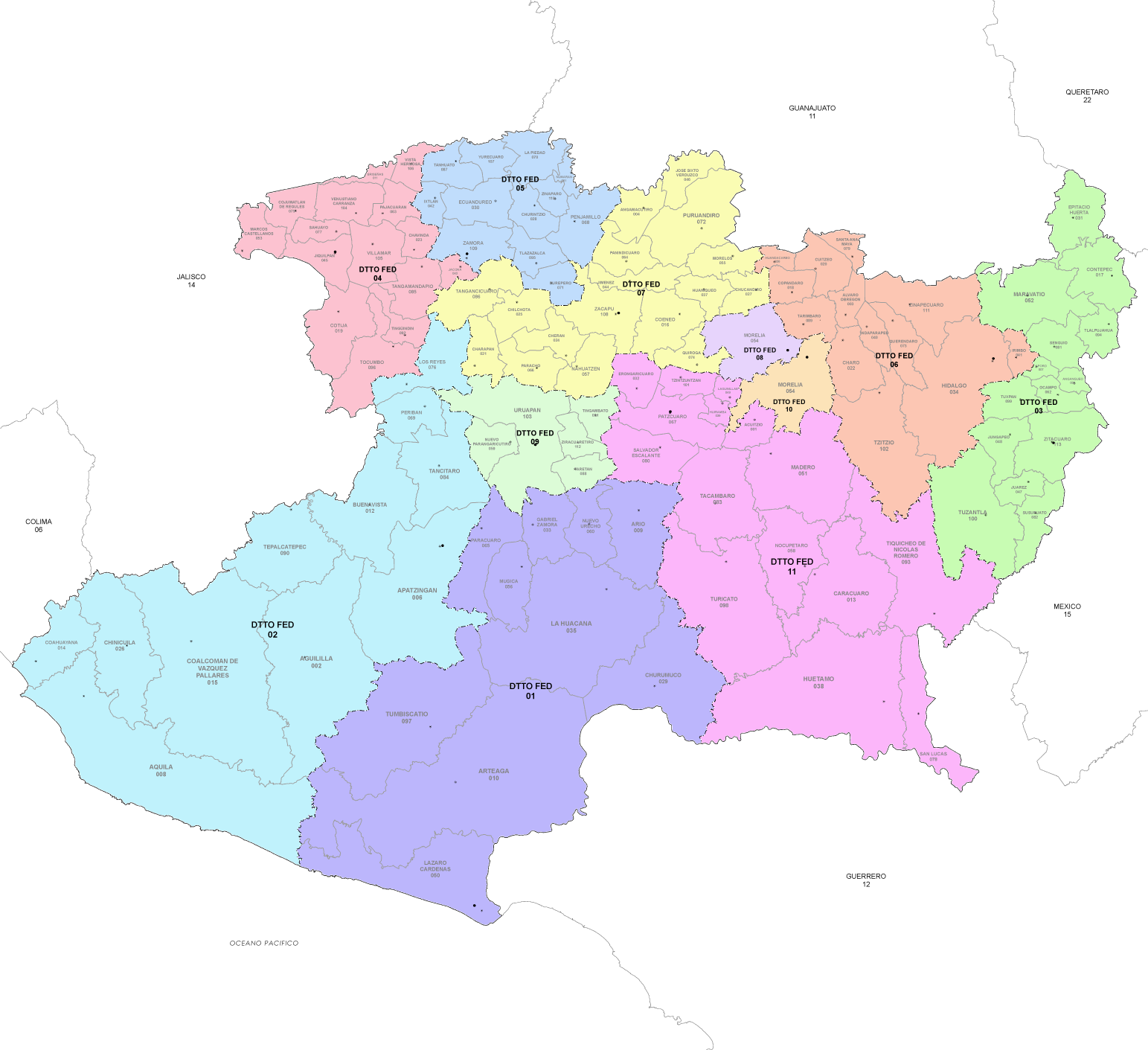
Michoacán's federal electoral districts since 2023

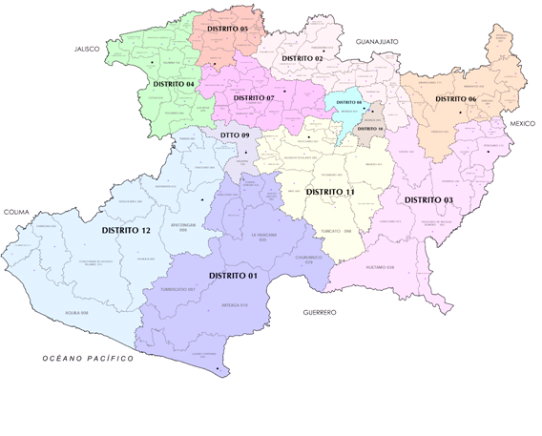
Michoacán under the 2017–2022 districting scheme

The 5th federal electoral district of Michoacán (Spanish: Distrito electoral federal 05 de Michoacán) is one of the 300 electoral districts into which Mexico is divided for elections to the federal Chamber of Deputies and one of 11 such districts in the state of Michoacán.

It elects one deputy to the lower house of Congress for each three-year legislative session by means of the first-past-the-post system. Votes cast in the district also count towards the calculation of proportional representation ("plurinominal") deputies elected from the fifth region.

The current member for the district, elected in the 2024 general election, is Delhi Miroslava Shember Domínguez of the National Regeneration Movement (Morena).

== District territory ==
Michoacán lost its 12th district in the 2023 districting process carried out by the National Electoral Institute (INE). Under the new districting plan, which is to be used for the 2024, 2027 and 2030 federal elections, the 5th district covers 281 precincts (secciones electorales) across 12 municipalities in the north-west of Michoacán, adjacent to the states of Jalisco and Guanajuato:

- Churintzio, Ecuandureo, Ixtlán, Numarán, Penjamillo, La Piedad, Purépero, Tanhuato, Tlazazalca, Yurécuaro, Zamora and Zináparo.

The head town (cabecera distrital), where results from individual polling stations are gathered together and tallied, is the city of Zamora de Hidalgo. The district reported a population of 441,653 in the 2020 census.

== Previous districting schemes ==
Evolution of electoral district numbers
| | 1974 | 1978 | 1996 | 2005 | 2017 | 2023 |
|---|---|---|---|---|---|---|
| Michoacán | 9 | 13 | 13 | 12 | 12 | 11 |
| Chamber of Deputies | 196 | 300 | | | | |

2017–2022

Between 2017 and 2022, the district's head town was at Zamora de Hidalgo and it comprised nine municipalities:
- Churintzio, Ecuandureo, Ixtlán, Numarán, La Piedad, Tanhuato, Yurécuaro, Zamora and Zináparo.

2005–2017

Under the 2005 districting plan, Michoacán lost its 13th district. The 5th district's head town was at Zamora de Hidalgo and it covered seven municipalities:
- Ecuandureo, Ixtlán, La Piedad, Tanhuato, Vista Hermosa, Yurécuaro and Zamora.

1996–2005

Under the 1996 districting plan, the district's head town was at Zamora de Hidalgo and it covered a different set of seven municipalities:
- Chavinda, Chilchota, Ixtlán, Jacona, Tangamandapio, Tangancícuaro and Zamora.

1978–1996

The districting scheme in force from 1978 to 1996 was the result of the 1977 electoral reforms, which increased the number of single-member seats in the Chamber of Deputies from 196 to 300. Under the reforms, Michoacán's allocation rose from 9 to 13. The 5th district's head town was at Zamora de Hidalgo and it was composed of five municipalities:
- Chavinda, Jacona, Tangamandapio, Villamar and Zamora.

== Deputies returned to Congress ==
(Mexico) National parties
- Current
- PAN
- PRI
- PT
- PVEM
- MC
- Morena
- PAZ
- Somos
- Defunct or local only
- PLM
- PNR
- PRM
- PNM
- PP
- PPS
- PARM
- PFCRN
- CON
- PANAL
- PSD
- PES
- PES
- PRD

Michoacán's 5th district
| Election | Deputy | Party | Term | Legislature |
|---|---|---|---|---|
| 1916 | Gabriel Cervera | | 1916–1917 | Constituent Congress of Querétaro |
...
| 1979 | Javier Zepeda Romero | Institutional Revolutionary Party | 1979–1982 | 51st Congress |
| 1982 | Guillermo Villa Ávila | Institutional Revolutionary Party | 1982–1985 | 52nd Congress |
| 1985 | Manuel María Bribiesca Castrejón | National Action Party (Mexico) | 1985–1988 | 53rd Congress |
| 1988 | Rodolfo Paniagua Álvarez | National Action Party (Mexico) | 1988–1991 | 54th Congress |
| 1991 | Mariano Carreón Girón | Institutional Revolutionary Party | 1991–1994 | 55th Congress |
| 1994 | Guillermo Alejandro Gómez Vega | Institutional Revolutionary Party | 1994–1997 | 56th Congress |
| 1997 | Santiago Padilla Arriaga | Party of the Democratic Revolution | 1997–2000 | 57th Congress |
| 2000 | Julio Castellanos Ramírez; Yadhira Tamayo Herrera | National Action Party (Mexico) | 2000–2003 | 58th Congress |
| 2003 | Reynaldo Valdés Manzo | Party of the Democratic Revolution | 2003–2006 | 59th Congress |
| 2006 | Ramón Ceja Romero | National Action Party (Mexico) | 2006–2009 | 60th Congress |
| 2009 | Arturo Torres Santos | National Action Party (Mexico) | 2009–2012 | 61st Congress |
| 2012 | Carolina Hernández Ortiz | Institutional Revolutionary Party | 2012–2015 | 62nd Congress |
| 2015 | Rosa Alicia Álvarez Piñones | Ecologist Green Party of Mexico | 2015–2018 | 63rd Congress |
| 2018 | Yolanda Guerrero Barrera | National Regeneration Movement | 2018–2021 | 64th Congress |
| 2021 | Enrique Godínez del Río | National Action Party (Mexico) | 2021–2024 | 65th Congress |
| 2024 | Delhi Miroslava Shember Domínguez | National Regeneration Movement | 2024–2027 | 66th Congress |

== Presidential elections ==
Michoacán's 5th district
| Election | District won by | Party or coalition | % |
|---|---|---|---|
| 2018 | Andrés Manuel López Obrador | Juntos Haremos Historia | 47.4014 |
| 2024 | Claudia Sheinbaum Pardo | Sigamos Haciendo Historia | 53.0925 |
