= Ixtlan =

Ixtlan may refer to:

- Ixtlán, Michoacan, Mexico
- Ixtlán del Río, Nayarit, Mexico
  - Ixtlán del Rio (archaeological site)
- Ixtlán de los Hervores, Michoacán, Mexico
- Ixtlán de Juárez, Oaxaca, Mexico
- Ixtlán District, Oaxaca, Mexico
- Radio Ixtlan, a 2004 record by the music group Ewigkeit

== See also ==
- Journey to Ixtlan, a book by Carlos Castaneda
