= 2015 Tanhuato–Ecuandureo shootout =

Event in the Mexican drug war

- Part of Mexican drug war
- State of Michoacán within Mexico
- Date: May 22, 2015; 7:00 a.m. – 10:00 a.m. (approximate)
- Location: Ecuandureo, Michoacán, Mexico; 20°10′24″N 102°17′07″W
- Caused by: Police investigation Armed aggression
- Result: Stalemate

Parties
Mexican Federal Police	Jalisco New Generation Cartel (suspected)

Lead figures
Enrique Francisco Galindo Ceballos; Monte Alejandro Rubido García	Nemesio Oseguera Cervantes (suspected)

Casualties and losses
1 dead	42 dead

On May 22, 2015, a three-hour shootout broke out between the Mexican Federal Police and alleged members of the Jalisco New Generation Cartel (CJNG) in Ecuandureo, Michoacán, leaving 43 dead. One of the fatalities was a Federal Police officer, while the others were suspected to be organized crime members. The confrontation started when the Federal Police spotted a suspicious vehicle on a highway in Tanhuato, Michoacán. The authorities had received information that one of the properties in the area had been overrun by criminals. Unconfirmed reports suggested that the CJNG leader Nemesio Oseguera Cervantes (alias "El Mencho") was in the area. When they tried to pull over the vehicle, however, the men onboard opened fire at the police units. A vehicle chase ensued and the security forces made their way into a large, rural property where the shootout intensified. The Federal Police then called for ground and air reinforcements and neutralized the situation.

The shootout is widely regarded as one of the bloodiest incidents in the ongoing Mexican drug war, which to date has taken the lives of tens of thousands in Mexico. According to the government, the shootout was one-sided because the security forces were better trained and equipped than the CJNG members. Critics, however, believed that there was a possibility that the incident was an extrajudicial mass murder. The Federal Police conducted tests at the crime scene and confirmed that the gunmen fired at the security forces and were shot from a distance. Mexico's National Human Rights Commission concluded their investigation in 2016 and stated that the Federal Police extrajudicially killed at least 22 of the 42 men. The police deny these findings.

== Shootout: initial incident ==
According to Mexico's national security commissioner Monte Alejandro Rubido García, at around 7:00 a.m. on May 22, 2015, agents of the Federal Police were patrolling the Autopista de Occidente, a highway that connects Guadalajara with Morelia and Mexico City, when they noticed several suspicious vehicles with armed civilians leaving a property close to the highway. The authorities were heading to a ranch property known as "Rancho del Sol" in Ecuandureo, Michoacán, (Note: The property was also cited as "El Sol" and "Rancho El Sol".) which borders the state of Jalisco, that they believed had been taken over by organized crime members on May 18.

On the highway, the police tried to pull over the vehicle, but the gunmen opened fire at the police units and attempted to escape, initiating a vehicle chase. The gunmen then fled to the original destination of the authorities, the "Rancho del Sol" ranch, where other gunmen were hiding. Inside the property, the organized crime members exited the vehicle and started shooting at the Federal Police units. The other gunmen that were inside the property joined them. The Federal Police commissioner Enrique Francisco Galindo Ceballos stated that the police asked for the gunmen to surrender through a megaphone, as part of the law enforcement protocol, but most of the gunmen ignored the request and continued the confrontation. Only three of them surrendered and turned themselves in.

== Reinforcements and wrap up ==
Due to the intensity of the shootout, the Federal Police called for ground and air reinforcements, including a Black Hawk helicopter with additional troops. Initially, 41 Federal Police officers participated in the confrontation. However, they called for 60 more officers to join them in the operation. The gunmen managed to shoot and hit the helicopter at least three times with AK-47s and AR-15s. However, the troops shot back at them and the gunmen were not able to use their grenade-launchers and machine guns, which had the capability of shooting down the helicopter. The gunmen that were hiding in one of the property's warehouses were killed by the helicopter's artillery. Some of them managed to run away from the warehouse and attempted to shoot at the helicopter, but they were neutralized in open field. The night shift gunmen who were sleeping also joined the confrontation but were also killed in the exchange. The Federal Police believed that at least 60 or 70 organized crime members participated in the shootout, but that some of them managed to escape. In total, Michaocán authorities concluded that at least 2,000 shots were fired during the gunfight after they recovered the fired bullets from the crime scene. Over 1,000 more unused ammunition were found in the gunmen's possession.

The shootout lasted at least three hours, mainly because the property was 112 hectares (277 acres) and it allowed for the gunmen to attack from various sides. 42 organized crime members were killed along with a Federal Police officer who was shot while aiding one of his comrades. Of the forty-two organized crime members killed, two of them were also former municipal police officers in Jalisco. (Note: Their names were Jesús Ricardo Vélez López and Édgar Ramírez Mayoral, and they were in the municipal police force in Ocotlán, Jalisco, for at least two years.) In addition, one Federal Police officer was wounded, while three gunmen were arrested. Eight vehicles, 36 assault rifles, a rocket launcher and several other weapons were seized by police in the shootout. Six of the vehicles, however, were consumed by flames that created a large cloud of smoke visible from a distance. The vehicles were burned because of grenades that detonated inside the warehouses where they were parked. Other reports suggested that the gunmen also had stolen fuel tanks close to the vehicles, and that they exploded during the shootout. Once the situation was neutralized, federal agents established several checkpoints in the border regions of Michoacán and Jalisco to tighten security and prevent the mobilization of organized crime groups.

== Aftermath and investigation ==
In a press conference on May 22 in Zamora, Michaocán, Rubido García provided to the media the details of the shootout. Though he did not name the Jalisco New Generation Cartel (CJNG) directly, he alluded that it was the group that was involved in the shootout. This was known because he stated that the group involved in the clash had its center of operations in Jalisco. In addition, the municipalities of Ecuandureo, Tanhuato, Vista Hermosa de Negrete, and Yurécuaro, were areas where the CJNG operated. He also stated that the operative was part of Operation Jalisco, a government-led military initiative that began on May 1, 2015. One of the main tasks of the operative is the dismantling of the CJNG. The official version of the events states that authorities went into the property where the shootout took place because they believed it had been invaded by criminals. However, other unconfirmed reports stated that law enforcement had information that Nemesio Oseguera Cervantes (alias "El Mencho"), the leader of the CJNG, was hiding inside the property. Those reports alleged that "El Mencho" managed to escape when the Federal Police engaged with the first CJNG unit in the highway since the element of surprise was gone.

Moreover, initial reports confused the setting with the rural community of Tinaja de Vargas in Tanhuato, Michoacán; this was because Tanhuato and Ecuandureo are divided by the federal highway and thus easily confusable. This version was confirmed by Tanhuato's mayor José Ignacio Cuevas Pérez, who stated that the ranch where the shootout took place is visible from the regional highway and is known for growing alfalfa. However, he noted, the property was listed for rent before being overrun by criminals. Officials believed that criminals had taken over the property because of its strategic location; the ranch was isolated and provided easy access to the highway and other roads that connected the property to nearby villages. In addition, the large size of the property allowed for criminals to hide. The mayor of Ecuandureo, José de Jesús Infante Ayala, said in an interview that the municipal government had not received any property taxes from the ranch and thereby had no information about it or the owner, who local citizens alleged that lived in Guadalajara, Jalisco.

The 43 corpses were recovered by the National Human Rights Commission (CNDH) and the Forensic Medical Service of Morelia, Michoacán, for their formal identification. At least six vehicles were needed to carry the bodies from the crime scene to the coroner's office in Morelia. The recovery of the bodies began at around 11:00 a.m. on May 22, 2015 and lasted before dawn the following day. This procedure was done in accordance to Mexican law, which required every corpse involved in the shootout to undergo a post-mortem study. Once this procedure concludes, the family members of the deceased can reclaim the bodies. The crime scene was cordoned by federal agents in order to prevent anyone from going into the property and tampering with the evidence of the shootout. The coroner's office in Morelia was also guarded by law enforcement. That same day, the Federal Police carried out a large ceremony in memory of their fallen officer in Iztapalapa, Mexico City. They recognized the officer's professionalism, discipline, and service, and honored the fact that he died while aiding a colleague.

=== Possible extrajudicial mass murder ===
In terms of organized crime–law enforcement clashes in Mexico, the death toll was one of the biggest in the presidency of Enrique Peña Nieto (2012–2018) and in the Mexican drug war. Because of the one-sided casualty rate, however, several media outlets have expressed doubts about the official version of the incident. The government claims that the events resulted in higher casualties from the side of the CJNG because law enforcement was better trained and equipped. However, critics believe that it may be a result of a staged incident or extrajudicial mass murder. On social media, some people uploaded several photographs of the crime scene that they believed showed some discrepancies. The Federal Police, however, conducted tests on the corpses and determined that all the CJNG gunmen had gunshot residue (meaning that they used their firearms to attack the officiers), and that they were killed from a distance (meaning that they were not killed execution-style). Despite the Federal Police's conclusions, the CNDH decided to open an independent investigation and did not discard the possibility of a mass murder case.

In August 2015, leading journalist Carlos Loret de Mola reportedly had access to the details of the investigation and published an article claiming that the killings were indeed extrajudicial. According to his findings, at least 70% of all the victims had a coup de grâce. He also stated that one of the victims did not have gunshot wounds and showed signs of a physical beating. As stated by other critics, Loret de Mola said that the corpses were moved around and that guns were planted next to them to resemble a shootout. This was apparently noticeable because some of the gun magazines were reportedly placed in incorrect models, and thus impossible to use during combat. In addition, given the corpses' state of decomposition, Loret de Mola argued that the shootout occurred between 4 and 5 a.m., several hours before the Federal Police reported that it happened.

In August 2016, the CNDH concluded their investigation and stated that at least 22 of the 42 were killed extrajudicially. They said that the Federal Police killed 22 men, most of them from Ocotlán, Jalisco, and then moved their bodies to the scene in order to fake their deaths there. The CNDH believes that this attack was a retaliation from the Federal Police. They suspected that the men were involved in organized crime since Ocotlán was traditionally a base and recruitment hub of the CJNG. The Federal Police, however, denies these findings and stated that the police's response was proportionate to the aggression they received from the gunmen killed at the shootout.

== Arrests and legal actions ==
The three detainees who surrendered and turned themselves in during the shootout were sent to the Office of the General Prosecutor in Michoacán for their formal declaration on May 22, 2015. They said they were natives of the state of Jalisco, but the municipalities where they were born, their names, and their ages were not revealed to the media that day. It was later confirmed that their names were Roberto Rafael Gutiérrez Rodríguez, José Eduardo Mares Lara, and César Jesús López Solís. They confessed that they had been recruited by the CJNG a few weeks before to sell drugs, carry out extortions, spy on law enforcement, and serve as foot soldiers in their confrontations against security forces. From there they were transferred to SEIDO, Mexico's anti-organized crime investigation agency, in Mexico City, before being taken to the Federal Social Readaptation Center No. 4 (also known as "El Rincón"), a maximum-security prison in Tepic, Nayarit. Federal authorities decided to carry out legal actions against the three for violating Mexico's Federal Law of Firearms and Explosives, which prohibits civilians from using weapons exclusively used by the Mexican Armed Forces.

== Identification of bodies ==
On May 24, 2015, forensic specialists identified 28 of the 43 bodies. Some of the family members complained that the victims were facially unrecognizable and questioned the official version of the events. An unnamed state official from Michoacán who was not authorized to speak with the press confirmed that all the victims were male and between 25 and 45 years old, and that most of them were native of Ocotlán, Jalisco. Others were from the State of Mexico, Michoacán, Aguascalientes, Coahuila, Sonora, and Tabasco. By May 25, 36 bodies had been handed over to their respective family members. Two days later, 38 bodies had been identified. For the four remaining bodies, Michoacán state authorities carried out DNA tests to the family members in order to determine the identities. One of the four corpses, however, was severely burned and physically unrecognizable.
