= Maria del Refugio Ramirez =

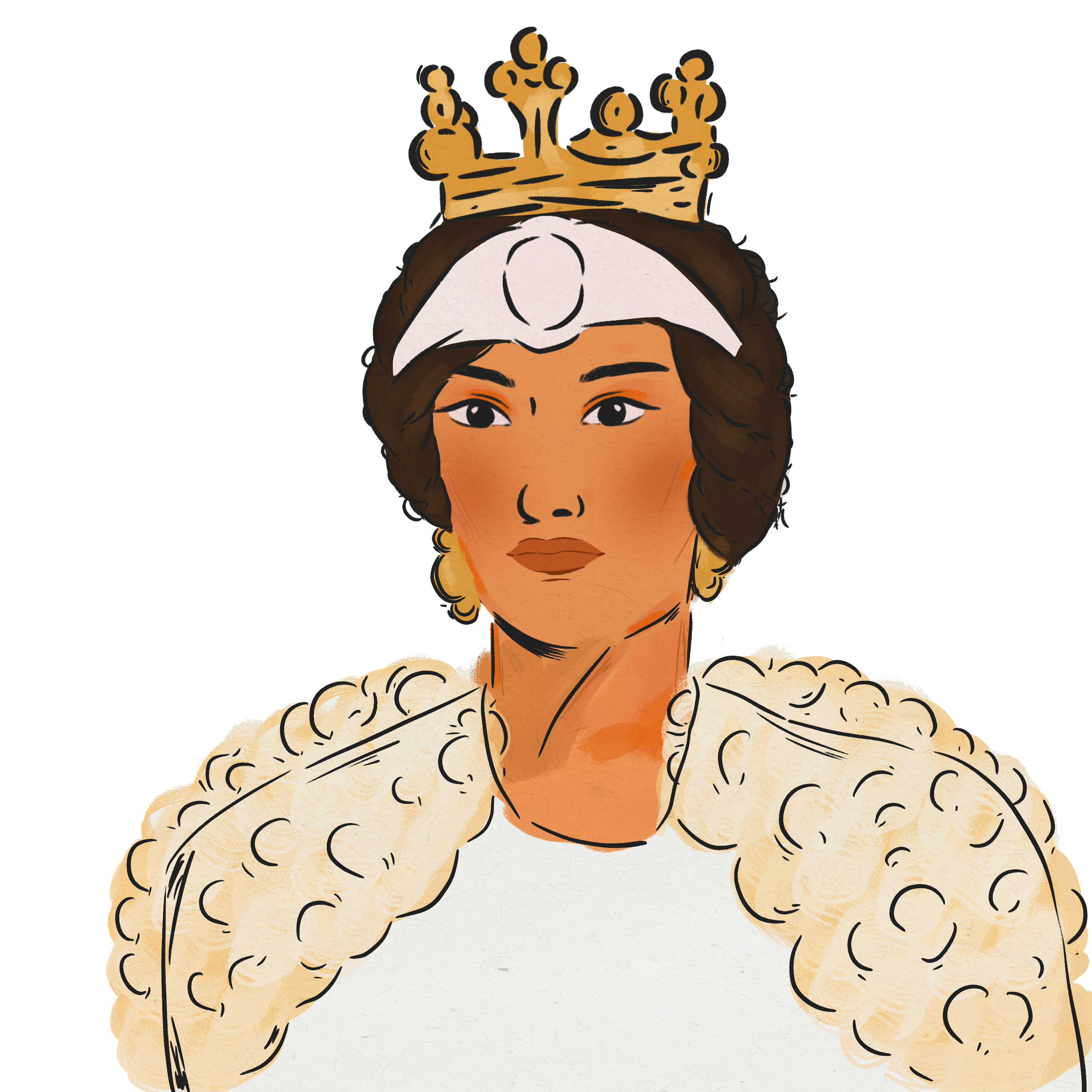
portrait by Julia Sorrenti

Maria del Refugio Ramirez (February 10, 1922 — March 27, 2010) was the first Queen of Fiestas Patrias, an annual parade celebration Mexico's Independence in the U.S. state of Indiana. The Fiestas Patrias Parade was established in 1924.

== Life ==
She was born in Ixtlán de los Hervores, Michoacan. She immigrated in 1917, initially to Kansas City. In 1925, she arrived in Indiana Harbor section of East Chicago, Indiana. In 1926, she was crowned the first Queen of Fiestas Patrias parade. A tradition that began in 1924. In October 1928, she left Indiana Harbor, with her widowed mother Josefa Cedillo Ramirez to Guadalajara, Mexico. In 1947, she returned to Indiana Har with her husband Rafael Godinez. She had two children, a step-son, Rafael Jr. and Sandra (nee Godinez) Valdes.
