= Vista Hermosa, Michoacán =

Vista Hermosa
- Municipality
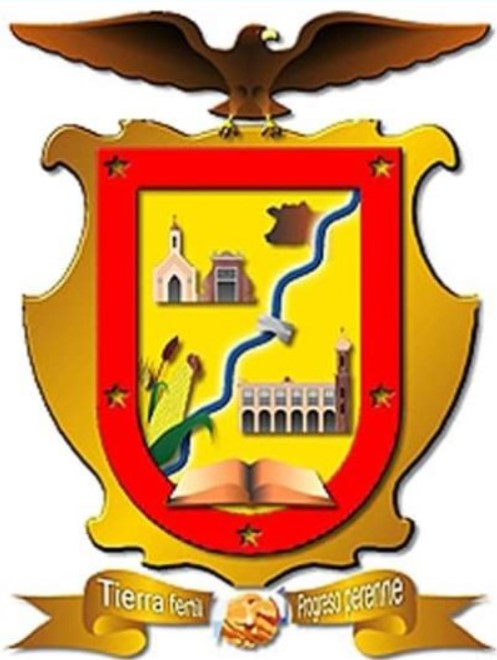
- Coat of arms

- Location of Vista Hermosa in Michoacán

- Location of Vista Hermosa in Mexico
- Coordinates: 20°16′22″N 102°28′50″W
- Country: Mexico
- State: Michoacán
- Established: 1 December 1921
- Seat: Vista Hermosa de Negrete

Government
  - President: Dolores Martínez Garibay (2024-2027)

Area
  - Total: 148.022 km^{2} (57.152 sq mi)
- Elevation (of seat): 1,530 m (5,020 ft)

Population (2010 Census)
  - Total: 18,995
  - Estimate (2015 Intercensal Survey): 20,624
  - Density: 128.33/km^{2} (332.36/sq mi)
  - Seat: 10,752
- Time zone: UTC-6 (Central)
- Postal codes: 59200–59220
- Area code: 328
- Website: Official website

Vista Hermosa (Spanish: "beautiful view") is a municipality in the Mexican state of Michoacán, located approximately 150 kilometres (93 mi) northwest of the state capital of Morelia.

== Geography ==
The municipality of Vista Hermosa is located at an elevation between 1,600 and 1,700 metres (5,200–5,600 ft) in the Bajío region in northwestern Michoacán. It borders the Michoacanese municipalities of Tanhuato to the east, Ixtlán to the southeast, Pajacuarán to the southwest, and Briseñas to the west. Additionally, the Lerma River forms the border between Vista Hermosa and the Jaliscan municipality of La Barca to the north. The municipality covers an area of 148.022 square kilometres (57.152 sq mi) and comprises 0.3% of the state's area.

As of 2009, 91% of the land in Vista Hermosa is used for agriculture and urban areas cover another 4% of the municipality. Vertisols are the main soil type in the municipality. The Duero River flows east to west through the southern part of the municipality, and meets the Lerma River at Ibarra in the adjacent municipality of Briseñas. The Gonzalo Reservoir lies on the border between Tanhuato and Vista Hermosa and has a total capacity of 7,600,000 cubic metres (270,000,000 cu ft) and a useful capacity of 6,600,000 cubic metres (230,000,000 cu ft).

Vista Hermosa has a temperate climate with rain in the summer. Average temperatures in the municipality range between 18 and 20 °C (64–68 °F), and average annual precipitation ranges between 700 and 1,000 millimetres (28–39 in).

== History ==
The settlement of Vista Hermosa was organized in the second half of the 19th century from the haciendas of Buenavista and El Molino. Vista Hermosa was established as a municipality on 1 December 1921 from localities previously part of Ixtlán and Tanhuato. The municipal seat was named Vista Hermosa de Negrete after José María Martínez Negrete, who bought the lands of the Molino hacienda after they were confiscated by the Mexican government and built a school there. In 1950, the municipality of Briseñas was separated from Vista Hermosa.

== Administration ==
The municipal government of Vista Hermosa comprises a president, a councillor (Spanish: síndico), and seven trustees (regidores), four elected by relative majority and three by proportional representation. The current president of the municipality is Rosa Elena de la Cruz Pérez Tello.

== Demographics ==
In the 2010 Mexican Census, the municipality of Vista Hermosa recorded a population of 18,995 inhabitants living in 4789 households. The 2015 Intercensal Survey estimated a population of 20,624 inhabitants in Vista Hermosa.

INEGI lists 16 localities in the municipality, of which two are classified as urban:

- the municipal seat Vista Hermosa de Negrete, which recorded a population of 10,752 inhabitants in the 2010 Census; and
- El Capulín, located 7 kilometres (4.3 mi) south of the municipal seat, which recorded a population of 2438 in 2010.

== Economy and infrastructure ==
Agriculture is the main economic activity in Vista Hermosa. Major crops grown include corn, sorghum, wheat, and vegetables such as chiles. The largest employer in the municipality is the meat producer SuKarne, which maintains a herd of 150,000 cattle in the municipality.

The toll expressway Federal Highway 15D runs through the municipality, as do Federal Highways 35 and 110.
