= Julio Castellanos Ramírez =

Mexican politician (born 1960)

- Born: 21 June 1960 (age 66); Zamora, Michoacán, Mexico
- Occupation: Politician
- Political party: PAN

Julio Castellanos Ramírez (born 21 June 1960) is a Mexican politician from the National Action Party (PAN).

From 1996 to 1998 he was the municipal president of Zamora, Michoacán.

In the 2000 general election he was elected to the Chamber of Deputies to represent Michoacán's fifth district during the 58th Congress. He returned to Congress in the 2009 mid-terms as a plurinominal deputy for the fifth region during the 61st Congress.

Preceded by Javier Tamayo Rodriguez	Municipal President of Zamora, Michoacán; 1995–1998	Succeeded by Samuel Arturo Navarro Sánchez
