= Arturo Torres Santos =

Mexican politician

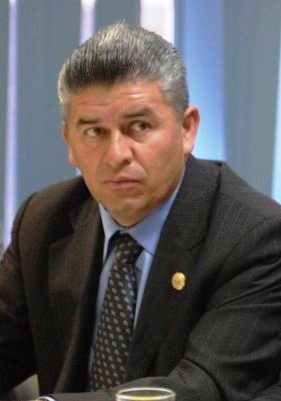
- Born: 19 April 1963 (age 63); La Piedad, Michoacán, Mexico
- Occupation: Politician
- Political party: PAN

Sergio Arturo Torres Santos (born 19 April 1963) is a Mexican politician from the National Action Party (PAN). In the 2009 mid-terms he was elected to the Chamber of Deputies to represent Michoacán's fifth district during the 61st Congress.
