= Reynaldo Valdés Manzo =

Mexican politician

- Born: 28 June 1950 (age 75); Zamora, Michoacán, Mexico
- Occupation: Politician
- Political party: PRD

Reynaldo Valdés Manzo (born 28 June 1950) is a Mexican politician affiliated with the Party of the Democratic Revolution (PRD). In the 2003 mid-terms he was elected to the Chamber of Deputies to represent Michoacán's fifth district during the 59th Congress.
