= El Colecio =

Coordinates: 20.1475°N 102.3016°W

Colecio, also written Colesio, is a town in the Mexican state of Michoacán. The town is the largest community of many other smaller communities from the Municipality of Ecuandureo.

The town of El Colecio is located between the cities of La Piedad and Zamora, along Mexican Federal Highway 15D. The town is located on the Tarascan Plateau in the northwestern part of the state, at an approximate elevation of 1,567 m (5,141 ft) above sea level. El Colecio is surrounded by the fertile Tziróndaro Valley which is an important agricultural area that exports large amounts of produce to the United States.

== History ==
As the legend goes, in the early 1900s the hacendados settled a small school in a hacienda along the hill "El Ensinal". As the hacendados built more houses, more people settled there. Other people from the city that could not pronounce "Colegio" started calling the place "Colecio", thus the name "El Colecio". By the years 1930-1950, the town had grown from a small ranch to a now-settled populated town. A well was drilled to extract water and electricity was introduced. The townspeople with the help of the priest of the San Antonio Church rebuilt the church and plaza completely by the 1970s. The plaza has been remodeled several times since then. A new church project started in the year 2010. Father Rey brought the people together and gathered money to build a new altar out of quarried rock.

== Attractions ==
Every May the town celebrates its traditional "Fiestas de Mayo". The festival is celebrated from May 1 until May 13, in which the whole town celebrates their patron saint: San Antonio. Dance, food, rides, souvenirs, and other attractions can be found during this time of year. This is one time of the year when the town flourishes with its people, along with others from other towns. The other time when there are a lot of people is in December, this is due to the posadas and Christmas time. The posadas are filled with music, food and happy people willing to share what little or much they have to offer each and everyone in the community. Before New Year's Eve, they have "El Dia Del Migrante". This day is dedicated to all the migrants that come and go from Mexico to the United States. Cars are lined up from the outskirts of the town to the plaza and drive around so the father can bless the cars. A mass is followed by this and a kermes party ends the night. This 2010 a new tradition was born. Karaoke along with live music for amateurs and professionals was the main attraction to celebrate the New Year.

== Sports ==
There are currently two soccer teams playing: El Colecio, and Colecio El Carmen. When the basketball court was in the Plaza, this was a popular sport in the Sunday afternoons after a good soccer match. Now that they have combined the Basketball and Volleyball court, Volleyball has taken a rise in popularity with the Colecio athletes.
