= Ramón Ceja Romero =

Mexican politician

Ramón Ceja Romero.
- Born: 7 May 1969 (age 55); Zamora, Michoacán, Mexico
- Education: UMSNH; UNAM
- Occupation: Politician Diputado Local (1995-1998). Secretario Particular Zamora Michoacán (200-2003). Subdelegado SEDESOL (2003-2006). Diputado Federal XVI Legislatura (2006-2009). (Presidente de la comisión de Reforma Agraria). Delegado en el Registro Agrario Nacional (2009-2012).

Ramón Ceja Romero (born 7 May 1969) is a Mexican politician affiliated with the National Action Party (PAN). In the 2006 general election he was elected to the Chamber of Deputies to represent Michoacán's fifth district during the 60th Congress.
