= 2015 San Sebastián del Oeste ambush =

2015 attack on Mexican police forces

- Part of the Mexican drug war
- State of Jalisco within Mexico
- Date: 6 April 2015; 2:50 p.m. – 3:20 p.m. (approximate)
- Location: San Sebastián del Oeste, Jalisco, Mexico
- Caused by: Retaliation for government crackdowns
- Methods: Guerrilla warfare ambush
- Result: Jalisco New Generation Victory

Parties
Mexico: Jalisco State Police	Jalisco New Generation Cartel

Lead figures
(Mexico) Miguel Ángel Caicedo Vargas †	Nemesio Oseguera Cervantes

Number
40 participants	80 participants

Casualties and losses
15 killed	0

Casualties
- Injuries: 5

On 6 April 2015, a convoy of the Jalisco State Police was ambushed by suspected members of the Jalisco New Generation Cartel (CJNG), a criminal group based in Jalisco. The attack occurred in a mountain road in San Sebastián del Oeste, Jalisco. Fifteen policemen were killed and five were wounded; no CJNG casualties were confirmed. According to police reports, as the police convoy reached a part of the road surrounded by mountains, the CJNG opened fire at the police units from the sides using high-caliber rifles, grenade launchers, and explosives with gasoline. The element of surprise prevented the police from repelling the aggression. The CJNG members burned several vehicles along the highway to halt reinforcements. The attack lasted roughly 30 minutes. When government reinforcements reached the scene, the CJNG gunmen had left.

The ambush was one of the deadliest single-attack incidents against Mexico's security forces in the ongoing Mexican drug war. It was also a rare display of bold attacks against law enforcement. In the past, criminal groups in Mexico tended to avoid direct confrontation with security forces. The attack also showcased the manpower and sophistication of the CJNG. The complexity of the attack showed that the CJNG had expertise in military tactics, guerrilla warfare, ambush and counter-ambush training, and in the use of explosives. According to investigators, the CJNG carried out the ambush to avenge the arrests and deaths of their fallen comrades from government crackdowns.

== Ambush and reactions ==
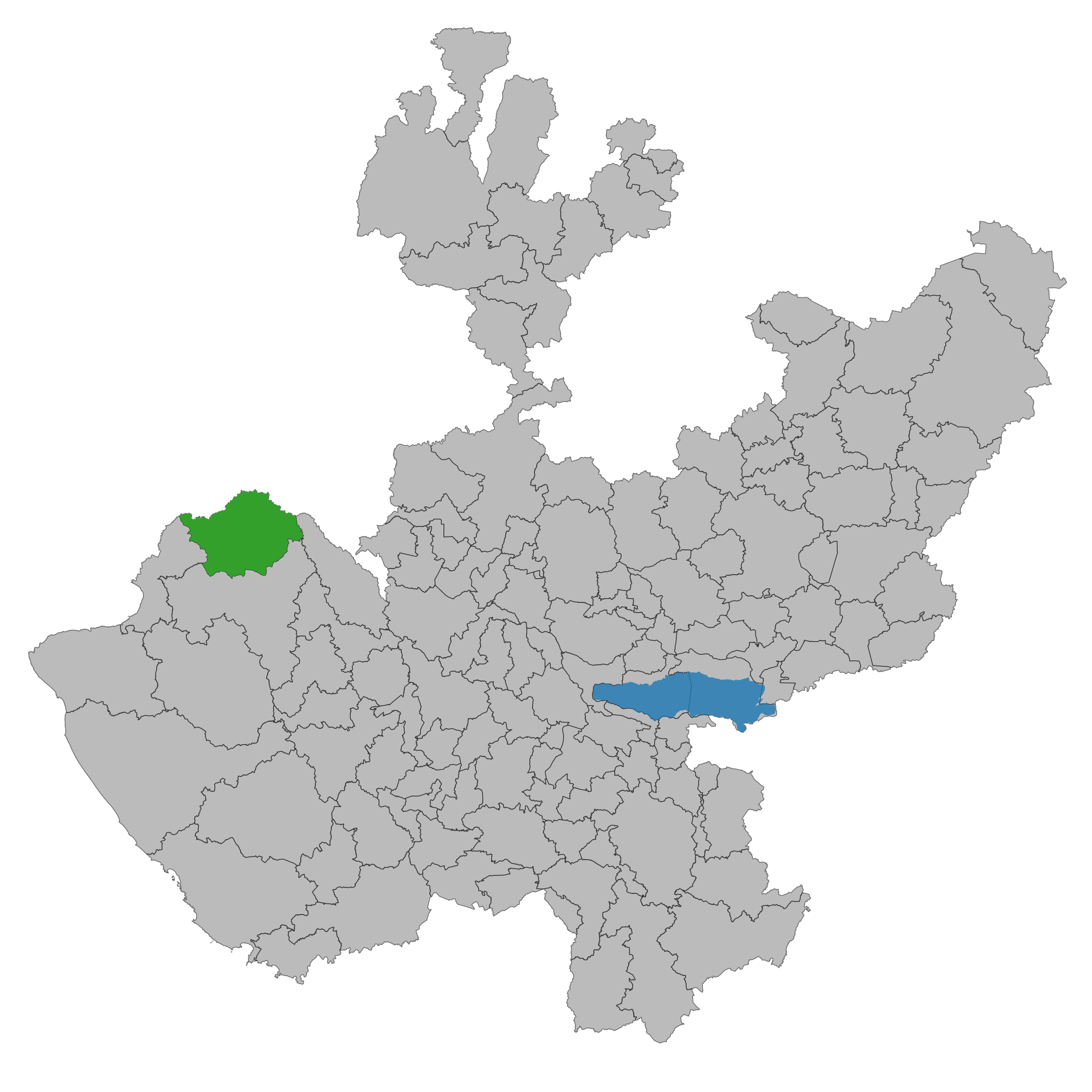
Location of San Sebastián del Oeste, Jalisco (in green), where the ambush took place

At around 2:50 p.m. on 6 April 2015, policemen from the Fuerza Única Jalisco, an elite unit of the Jalisco State Police, drove through a mountain road in Soyatán, a rural community in San Sebastián del Oeste, Jalisco. They were driving from Puerto Vallarta to Guadalajara, the state's capital. (Note: The Jalisco State Police was in Puerto Vallarta for the Holy Week holidays. The city is a popular spot for international tourists. The policemen were on their way home after 15 days of work.) As they were crossing through the Mascota–Las Palmas highway, a road that was covered by mountains on both sides, they were ambushed by suspected members of the Jalisco New Generation Cartel (CJNG), a criminal group based in the Jalisco. The CJNG gunmen burned several vehicles along the highway to block the road and delay the arrival of potential government reinforcements. (Note: Another source stated that the burning vehicles were put in place to force the police to stop before being attacked.) As the police units got to a curve, the CJNG gunmen opened fire at them with machine guns and grenade launchers from the side of the mountains. (Note: One of the vehicles was found on kilometer 47 of the highway. The other was found on kilometer 100. The attack occurred on kilometer 56.) The attack worsened when the CJNG gunmen threw explosives along with jugs of gasoline from strategic locations.

Given the element of surprise, the policemen did not have the chance to defend themselves from the aggression. The policemen that got out of the vehicles were shot by the CJNG. Those who stayed inside them died of calcination. In total, 15 police officers were killed in the ambush. (Note: At least 11 of the 15 corpses were completely burned. Preliminary reports stated that "at least 16" policemen were killed. This figure later changed to 15 once an official announcement was made.) Five more were wounded and transported by helicopter to a wounded-care zone in Puerto Vallarta before being transferred to several hospitals across the Guadalajara Metropolitan Area. Authorities reported them as being in stable condition. No casualties on the CJNG's side were confirmed because the gunmen were able to escape. (Note: An unnamed Jalisco official stated that investigators suspected that there might have been casualties on the CJNG's side. He did not go into detail about this. The injuries of the CJNG's side are unknown as well.) The police called for reinforcements in Guadalajara. Several police units drove to the area, and a helicopter made it to the scene to provide air support. The Mexican Navy and the Mexican Federal Police (PF) then carried out a search of the surrounding areas to locate the CJNG gunmen. Investigators discovered that the assailants built an encampment in the mountains and waited for the police for as long as 48 hours. (Note: At the top of the mountain, investigators discovered plastic water bottles, clothes, condoms, beer cans, canned food, and two tents.)

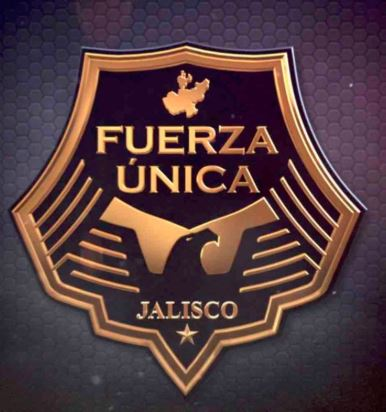
Logo of Fuerza Única Jalisco, an elite unit within the Jalisco State Police

Some of the police units were completely burnt and totaled. Firefighters from Puerto Vallarta were called to the scene put down the flames in the burning vehicles. At the scene, investigators found hundreds of high-caliber bullet casings and detonated grenade fragmentation. At least two vehicles from the CJNG were purposely burnt to block the roads, but investigators were not able to determine if the vehicles were owned by uninvolved civilians whose cars were hijacked by the CJNG to block the road. There were no reported injuries during the road blockades carried out by the CJNG. After the shootout took place, the area was cordoned by law enforcement; the road where the attack occurred was closed for security measures. Several drivers complained because they were trying to leave or go to Puerto Vallarta but were unable to do so. (Note: The day of the attack, San Sebastián del Oeste had a large influx of vacationers.) That same evening, Jalisco authorities issued a communiqué confirming that the attack had taken place, but did not specify the casualties until the following morning. The report stated that the attack against the police was a retaliation for the 23 March death of Heriberto Acevedo Cárdenas (alias "El Gringo"), (Note: He had an alternative name, Héctor Manuel Flores Cárdenas, and another alias, "El Güero".) a suspected regional leader of the CJNG. In addition, the report stated that the attack was provoked by the arrest of 15 suspected CJNG members following an assassination attempt against Francisco Alejandro Solorio Aréchiga, Jalisco's security commissioner, on 30 March.

A day after the attack, Jorge Aristóteles Sandoval Díaz, the Governor of Jalisco, called for a meeting with several high-ranking government officials at the Municipal Palace of Guadalajara (es). In the meeting, authorities confirmed the involvement of the CJNG in the attacks. Among the groups present were local security groups in Jalisco, the Mexican Army, the Attorney General of Mexico (PGR), the PF, the Center for Research and National Security, and the Attorney General of Jalisco. Solorio Aréchiga confirmed that the Government of Jalisco did not activate the "Red Code" alert, which is the highest level in the alert system and is used when the state is considered to be under the highest level of danger, despite rumors that it was activated. He went into detail about the ambush, and gave the press more background on the possible motives behind the attack, including the death of El Gringo and previous arrests of suspected CJNG members as part of the murder attempt against him. He also stated that Sandoval ordered the government to increase security measures and operatives across Jalisco, and that they were receiving support from institutions within the Secretariat of Public Security, a branch of the federal government. The government confirmed that the families of the deceased would receive help with funeral costs and with the policemen's life insurance benefits. (Note: Each family member received MXN$525,000 in life insurance, three months of salary to cover for funeral costs, and assistance for living expenses.)

== Background and possible motives ==
This attack was unusual in the ongoing Mexican drug war (2006–present) because large scale single-attacks against Mexico's security forces were uncommon. Attacks against security forces usually took place because organized crime members were being pursued and wanted to escape. The planned nature of this attack highlighted that organized crime military tactics were advanced and reaching new levels. In addition, though shootings between criminal groups and law enforcement were common, it was rare for criminal groups to come off victorious in gunfights. This attack was the largest death toll on law enforcement's side since 2009. (Note: The previous attack occurred on 13 July 2009. 12 policemen were tortured and killed in La Huacana, Michoacán by suspected members of La Familia Michoacana. The source cited confuses the date with 2010.) Because of the one-sided death toll on the police's side, the ambush garnered international attention. Jalisco was one of the four states in Mexico that President Enrique Peña Nieto (2012–2018) considered a priority for his national security initiative. Between March 2013 and April 2015, at least 70 government officials were killed in Jalisco. (Note: Other sources have the figures over 100. The Government of Jalisco disputes these figures.) According to official reports from the Mexican government, there were 1,025 homicides linked to organized crime in Jalisco in 2014. This was lower than the year before, which totaled 1,485. These numbers are considerably higher than 2009, when Jalisco reported 679 homicides.

The month before the ambush, on 19 March 2015, the CJNG attacked a convoy of the National Gendarmerie (es), a branch of the PF, in Ocotlán, Jalisco. Eleven people were killed; five of them were police officers. The attacks were part of a larger campaign by the CJNG to avenge the capture or deaths of its leaders. Investigators believe that the attacks were masterminded by Nemesio Oseguera Cervantes (alias "El Mencho"), the top leader of the CJNG and one of Mexico's most-wanted drug lords. The intention of the attacks was to avenge their fallen comrades and show the government their manpower to strike back. On 23 March 2015, El Gringo and his suspected henchmen were driving through Zacoalco de Torres, Jalisco, when they encountered the Jalisco State Police. The CJNG members tried to escape, but their vehicle turned over as they sped away from the police units. Two gunmen opened fire at the police officers and threw a grenade at them.

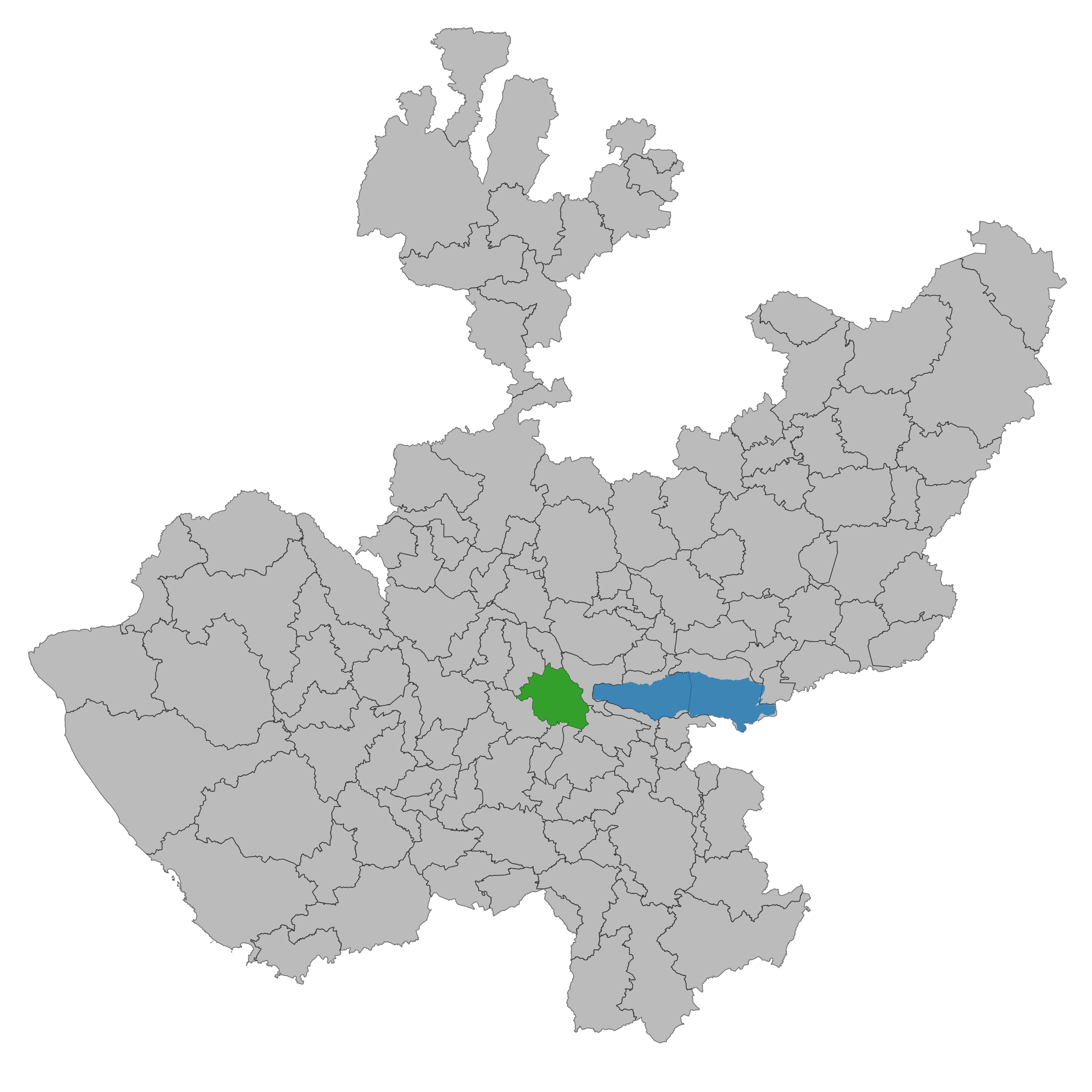
Location of Zacoalco de Torres, Jalisco (in green), where the previous attacks took place

However, the police was able to neutralize the aggression and kill four of them, including El Gringo. One policeman was wounded in the attack; he was shot in the leg and calf, but was reported in stable condition. At the time of his death, El Gringo was suspected by law enforcement to be the regional leader of the CJNG in Zocalco de Torres and other municipalities of the region. (Note: El Gringo was one of El Mencho's close associates. He joined the CJNG in 2011 as a bodyguard of Abundio Mendoza Gaytán (alias "El Güero"). The municipalities that El Gringo presided over were Cocula, Tapalpa and Atemajac de Brizuela, among others in Jalisco's Región Valles region.) There were 10 pending investigations against him, and he was suspected to be involved in gas theft, kidnappings, and in at least nine homicides. They also believed that he was responsible for a number of attacks against law enforcement, including the gunfight that left four Mexican Army soldiers dead on 12 May 2014 in Guachinango, Jalisco, and the murder of two police investigators in Tlajomulco de Zúñiga, Jalisco on 29 July 2014. According to investigators, El Mencho reportedly ordered the CJNG to carry out attacks against the government security forces in Jalisco as retaliation for El Gringo's death.

On 30 March, suspected CJNG members carried out an attack against Jalisco's security commissioner Solorio Aréchiga while he was driving in Zapopan, Jalisco. Over 100 shots were fired from both sides, but Solorio Aréchiga's bodyguards were able to repel the CJNG's armed aggression and help him come out of the shooting unharmed. Investigators confirmed that this was a direct assassination attempt against Solorio Aréchiga, and that it stemmed from the government crackdowns on the CJNG's leadership structure. A few days after this incident, the CJNG carried out the ambush in San Sebastián del Oeste. Solorio Aréchiga insisted that the ambush was also a result of the extensive investigation and arrests carried out by the government after the assassination attempt. State officials stated that it was likely that the CJNG would carry out more attacks after the ambush against Mexican security forces based in Jalisco. In a year, dating from the day of the ambush and back, 24 law enforcement agents in Jalisco were killed in ambush attacks with similar military tactics as ones used in San Sebastián del Oeste.

== Analysis of attack and formations ==
Investigators believe that the CJNG outnumbered the Jalisco State Police during the ambush. According to Luis Carlos Nájera Gutiérrez de Velasco, the Attorney General of Jalisco, the CJNG had at least 80 gunmen on their side. The Jalisco State Police had around 40. In an interview with the press, he explained the formation of the police units prior to being attacked by the CJNG. The Jalisco State Police was traveling in 10 vehicles; each vehicle paired up with another one – a standard protocol to prevent attacks from organized crime – while crossing through the mountain road where they were ambushed. Of the 10 vehicles, only four were attacked. Each of those four vehicles had four officers in them, totaling 16 (out of those 16, only one survived, by faking his own death). The CJNG gunmen were hiding in the mountains' sides in a curve. The gunmen attacked from at least 12 different shooting spots from the top of the mountains. They used a number of high-calibre assault rifles and ammunition. Among them were AK-47s, AR-15s, 40 mm grenades, and M-60 machine guns, which are capable of firing over 500 shots per minute. Some of the bullets found in the crime scene were specifically for detailed perforation. Nájera Gutiérrez de Velasco explained that the turning point of the attack occurred when the CJNG threw explosives attached to 20 liters of gasoline from the top of the mountains, engulfing four police vehicles.

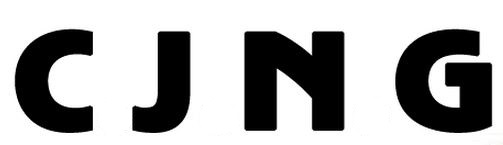
Logo with the Spanish acronym of the Jalisco New Generation Cartel (CJNG), the criminal group responsible for the attacks

Some of the policemen were not able to recognize where the shots were coming from. After roughly 30 minutes of gunfire, the CJNG gunmen left through the mountains' forest. Investigators were not able to confirm any casualties from the CJNG's side, but Nájera Gutiérrez de Velasco stated that it was not uncommon for organized crime members to retrieve the bodies of their fallen comrades from the battlefield to prevent authorities from investigating and identifying the corpses. He said that the suspects were probably hiding in the nearby mountains, which makes it difficult for law enforcement to conduct a thorough search of the area. Nájera Gutiérrez de Velasco admitted that one of the biggest obstacles of the investigation was understanding how the CJNG found out the exact day, time, and place the police convoy was going to pass through the area where they were ambushed. He believes that the CJNG had precise information on the police's journey, and does not discard the possibility that an outsider might have given the CJNG information on the police's arrangements, or that someone inside the police ranks was passing along information to them.

Jalisco authorities believe that the attack was planned by members of the CJNG who were experts in military tactics, ambush and counter-ambush training, and guerrilla warfare. Sophisticated attacks like the ones seen in San Sebastián del Oeste had not occurred before in Jalisco during the Mexican drug war. (Note: The first time that Jalisco authorities recognized the dangerousness and manpower of the CJNG was on 19 March 2015, when they ambushed the National Gendarmerie in Ocotlán.) The attack showcased the CJNG's manpower, discipline in combat, and ability to coordinate complex attacks without experiencing any casualties. In addition, they stated that those who planned the attack were experts in explosives, which made them think that the CJNG had members with former military or police training with experience in such combat. Nájera Gutiérrez de Velasco told the press that investigators had evidence that the CJNG was recruiting foreign paramilitary gunmen as foot soldiers in Jalisco. They also had evidence that the CJNG was innovating its arsenal and making its own versions of the AR-15 and M16 assault rifles.

Several police officers who were present during the ambush complained that the attack was a result of a series of mistakes made by Jalisco State Police. They asked to have their identities protected to avoid retaliation by organized crime or the police. In an interview with the press, they stated that there were logistical and strategic mistakes the day the attack occurred. According to them, the policemen involved in the ambush were only carrying one load of ammunition for their rifles and handguns. They also stated that the police commander was not with his troops when the ambush occurred, and that he ordered the first part of the convoy to drive further away from the convoy and separate from the rest. He stated that the travel time between the first part of the convoy and his when the police were ambushed was at least 40 minutes. According to the source, a white Suburban passed the convoy and then did zig-zag moves ahead of them, apparently signaling the CJNG that the police convoy was coming up. They explained that when the ambush occurred, their vehicle tires were flattened by the bullets. They were able to escape by driving in reverse at full speed and hiding in a drainage system nearby. Nájera Gutiérrez de Velasco denied the claims that the police commander was not in the ambush. He also stated that the police did not go out on duty with one load of ammunition, and that the police commander was in the back part of the convoy, where he was able to call for reinforcements to save a wounded officer.

== Immediate aftermath and memorials ==
Several hours after the ambush, suspected CJNG gunmen based in Zacoalco de Torres killed Miguel Ángel Caicedo Vargas, the police chief of that municipality. According to investigators, the police chief was kidnapped and tortured before being killed. The assassins stabbed cardboard onto the corpse with a written message warning law enforcement that he was killed for the death of El Gringo. His body was dumped in a car wash shop in Zacoalco de Torres. Witnesses stated that the assassins were driving a white Suburban with Sinaloa license plates. Jalisco authorities stated that this execution and the ambush were both doings of the CJNG. Municipal authorities from Zacoalco de Torres refused to provide details on the murder, and did not say if they were planning to host a memorial ceremony for Caicedo Vargas. Citizens from Zacoalco de Torres said they were worried about the situation in their town; in 15 days, the town hosted the shootout where El Gringo was killed and the murder of its local police chief. Locals stated that there was a strong presence of the Jalisco State Police following both incidents. A memorial service was carried out at the city's convention center on 8 April. The police department where Caicedo Vargas worked, which sat across the street from the convention center, placed a black ribbon in front of their main entrance. The PGR took over the ambush case, and stated that it would charge the suspects with organized crime, illegal possession of firearms, and homicide. This placed the investigation under federal jurisdiction.

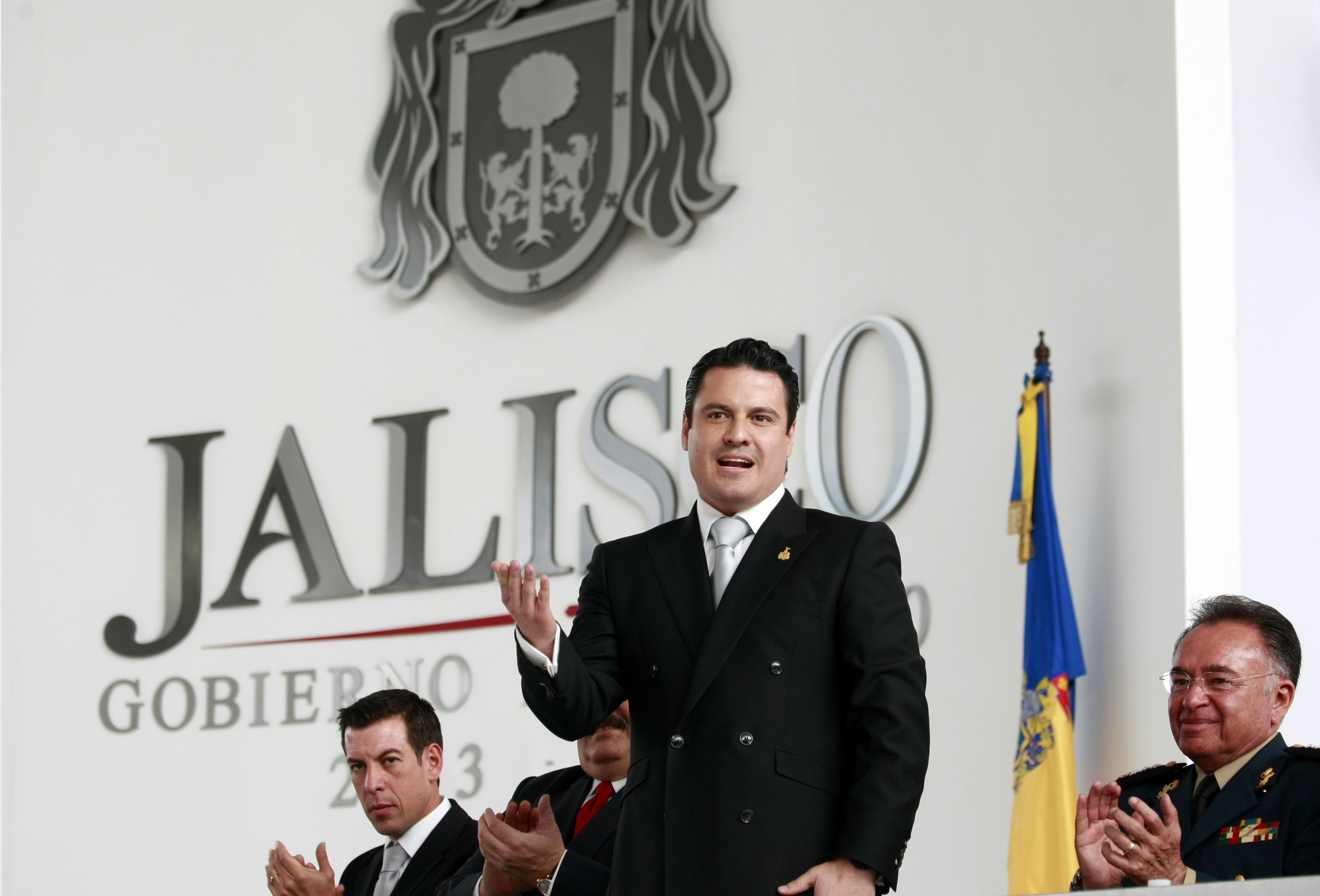
Picture of Jalisco Governor Jorge Aristóteles Sandoval Díaz in a press conference

On 6 April 2015, the Government of Jalisco hosted a memorial ceremony near the crime scene. The ceremony was headed by Jesús Eduardo Almaguer Ramírez, a federal prosecutor from Jalisco. He offered his condolences to the victims' families on behalf of Governor Sandoval Díaz. Members from all three levels of the Mexican federal government were present during the ceremony. Almaguer Ramírez stated that they were proud of their troops' strength and honor, and thanked them for their support. Fernando Andrade Vicencio, one of the heads of the Jalisco State Police squadrons, read the names of all the officers killed while the officers present yelled "present" for each of them. The survivors of the ambush received medals for their service. A plaque in honor of the fallen policemen was unveiled following the ceremony. The next day, on behalf of the Government of Jalisco, the state's secretary general Roberto López Lara lamented the incident through social media and stated that the government would remember and honor the deceased officers as "heroes". Solorio Aréchiga stated on social media that the "cowardly attack" would not go unpunished. On 8 April in Mexico City, the Senate of the Republic held a moment of silence for the 15 policemen killed.

A larger ceremony was held again on 8 April in Tlaquepaque, Jalisco, this time with Governor Sandoval Díaz and the victims' families. Over 1,000 people attended the ceremony. In his eight-minute speech, Sandoval Díaz stated that the attack would not go unpunished. "They will not be an extra number in our statistics," he said. He also stated that the assassins were going to "pay" for what they did, and clarified that it was not a cry for war, but rather a cry for peace and justice. He also asked all police corporations to continue fighting organized crime. Solorio Aréchiga read the names of all the officers killed, but had to stop momentarily to sob. For each of the names, the policemen repeated the same process as before, yelling "present" for each of them. After that, the police band did a taps call. Once it concluded, the audience clapped for one minute. The coffins were wrapped in the Flags of Jalisco. In front of each coffin was a flower arrangement, the banner of the Fuerza Única branch, and a framed photograph of the victim. Each of the victims' family members was given an official banner of the state of Jalisco. A year later, on 6 April 2016, the Government of Jalisco hosted another ceremony near the ambush site with the victims' families. Fuerza Única banners were placed across the mountainous road where the attack occurred.

== Government crackdowns ==
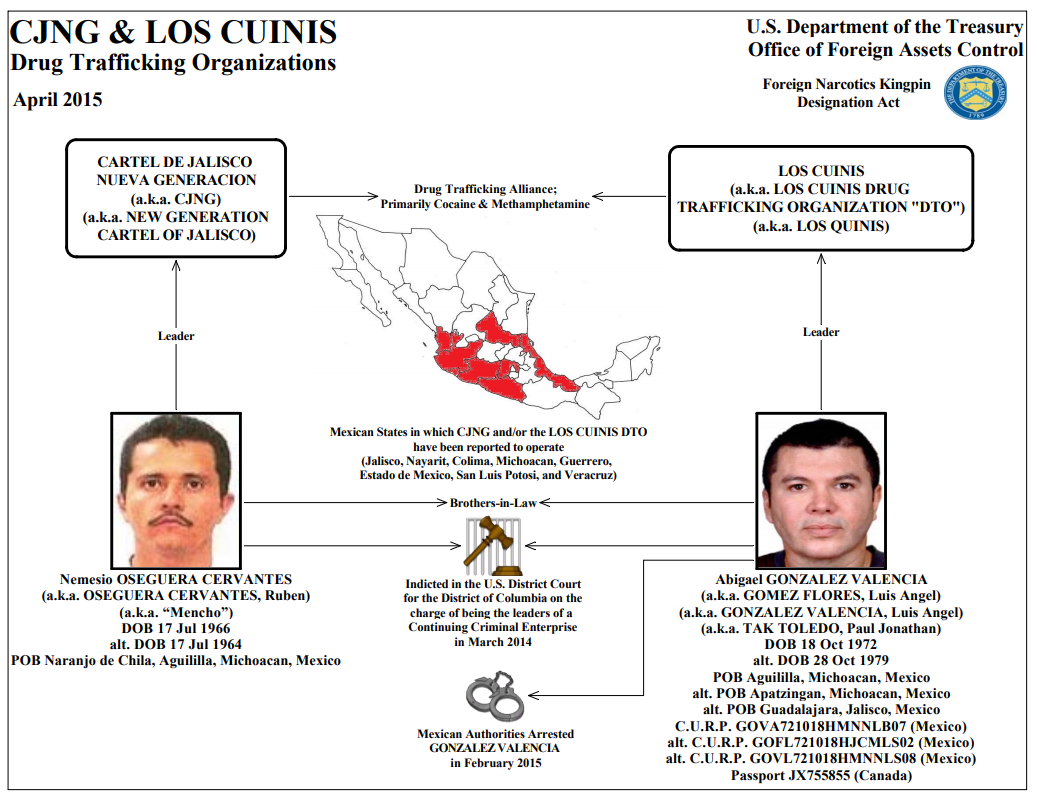
Chart released by the Office of Foreign Assets Control (OFAC) sanctioning the CJNG and its two leaders

On 8 April 2015, two days after the ambush, the United States Department of the Treasury's Office of Foreign Assets Control (OFAC) sanctioned the CJNG under the Foreign Narcotics Kingpin Designation Act ("Kingpin Act") for his involvement in international drug smuggling operations. The sanction was a joint investigation conducted by the Treasury and the Drug Enforcement Administration (DEA) office in Los Angeles as part of a larger effort with their Mexican counterparts to sanction drug trafficking groups in Mexico. The sanction extended to El Mencho, his brother-in-law Abigael González Valencia, and Los Cuinis. As part of the sanction, all the U.S.-based assets and/or assets in control of U.S. individuals on behalf of El Mencho, González Valencia, the CJNG, and Los Cuinis, were frozen in the U.S. In addition, the act prohibited U.S. citizens from engaging in business activities with them. According to the OFAC's announcement, the CJNG was one of Mexico's rapidly growing criminal groups. Through their "use of violence and corruption", they said, the CJNG was able to consolidate itself as one of Mexico's leading drug trafficking organizations.

On 11 April, Jalisco authorities told the press that investigators concluded that the prime suspect in the ambush was one of El Gringo's family members, who ordered the attack as a retaliation for his death. According to government reports, this suspect was arrested on 19 June 2012 by the Mexican Army for allegedly being involved in organized crime and drug trafficking in Michoacán. El Gringo's family member was then transferred to the PGR installations in Apatzingán, Michoacán. On 21 June, an armed commando stormed the installations, subdued an officer from the Federal Investigation Agency (AFI), ordered him to open the prison cells, and rescued El Gringo's relative and another man. The two men were Julio Acevedo Cárdenas and Joel Contreras Cárdenas. (Note: None of the cited sources indicate which of the two was El Gringo's relative.) Before taking off, the gunmen killed the AFI officer. When the PGR found out about the incident, they issued a national alert at the country's border exit stations to prevent them from leaving Mexico.

On 22 September, the PF and the Army arrested Giovanni Castro Urbano (alias "El Duende"), (Note: He also had an alternative name, Juan Carlos Márquez Pérez.) a suspected high-ranking leader of the CJNG and close associate of El Mencho, in Ameca, Jalisco. The arrest came after a 15-minute shootout between the CJNG and the law enforcement officers. According to government sources, El Duende was acting as El Gringo's successor in the CJNG's leadership structure, and was suspected of being involved in multiple attacks against security forces, including the incident in San Sebastián del Oeste, Guachinango, and one in San Martín de Hidalgo, Jalisco in 2014, where the CJNG carried out an attack against the PF and the Army. Four military men were wounded and one was killed.

On 12 March 2016, state authorities in Lagos de Moreno, Jalisco arrested Miguel Pérez Contreras, (Note: He also has alternative names, Sergio Contreras Pérez and Óscar Pérez González. His nicknames were "El Chorkas" and "El Tlacuache".) a suspected CJNG member who was reportedly involved in the Guachinango and San Sebastián del Oeste attacks. Since he was arrested with a large arsenal of weapons, he was placed on PGR jurisdiction. Federal authorities interrogated him and discovered that he was part of a CJNG cell based in Región Valles, Jalisco. In addition, they discovered that he was in contact with a female based in the United States who helped recruit people from American private security companies to work for the CJNG.

== See also ==
- Timeline of the Mexican drug war
