= Yadhira Yvette Tamayo Herrera =

Mexican politician

- Born: 19 October 1973 (age 52); Ixtlán de los Hervores, Michoacán, Mexico
- Occupation: Politician
- Political party: PAN

Yadhira Yvette Tamayo Herrera (born 17 October 1973) is a Mexican politician from the National Action Party. From 2000 to 2003 and 2006 to 2009 she served as Deputy of the LVIII and LX Legislatures of the Mexican Congress representing Michoacán. Tamayo Herrera is now a senator in the LXV Legislature since December 2023 to substitute for Kenia López Rabadán.
