= Tanhuato =

- Municipality
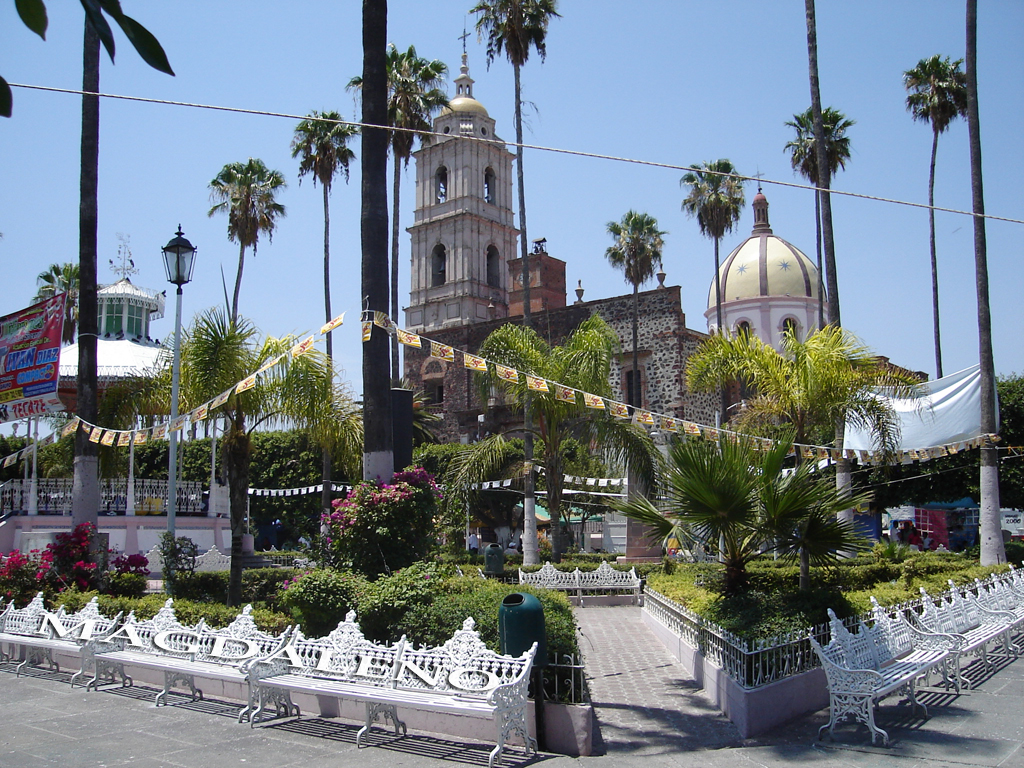
- The main square in Tanhuato de Guerrero in 2006

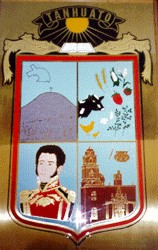
- Coat of arms

- Location of Tanhuato in Michoacán

- Location of Tanhuato in Mexico
- Coordinates: 20°16′55″N 102°19′55″W
- Country: Mexico
- State: Michoacán
- Established: 10 December 1831
- Seat: Tanhuato de Guerrero

Government
  - President: Héctor Daniel Aranda Pérez

Area
  - Total: 228.732 km^{2} (88.314 sq mi)
- Elevation (of seat): 1,543 m (5,062 ft)

Population (2010 Census)
  - Total: 15,176
  - Estimate (2015 Intercensal Survey): 15,352
  - Density: 66.348/km^{2} (171.84/sq mi)
  - Seat: 9,546
- Time zone: UTC-6 (Central)
- Postal codes: 59230–59244
- Area code: 356
- Website: Official website

Tanhuato is a municipality in the Mexican state of Michoacán. It is located approximately 135 kilometres (84 mi) northwest of the state capital of Morelia.

== Geography ==
The municipality of Tanhuato is located at an elevation between 1,600 and 2,000 metres (5,200–6,600 ft) in the Bajío region in northwestern Michoacán. It borders the Michoacanese municipalities of Yurécuaro to the east, Ecuandureo to the southeast, Ixtlán to the southwest, and Vista Hermosa to the west. Additionally, the Lerma River forms the border between Tanhuato and the Jaliscan municipalities of Ayotlán to the northeast and La Barca to the northwest. The municipality covers an area of 228.732 square kilometres (88.314 sq mi) and comprises 0.39% of the state's area.

As of 2009, the land cover in Tanhuato consists of tropical forest (31%) and grassland (9%). More than half (57%) of the land is used for agriculture and 1.9% consists of urban areas. The main soil types are vertisols (74%) and phaeozems (23%). The Gonzalo Reservoir lies on the border between Tanhuato and Vista Hermosa and has a total capacity of 7,600,000 cubic metres (270,000,000 cu ft) and a useful capacity of 6,600,000 cubic metres (230,000,000 cu ft).

Tanhuato has a temperate climate with rain in the summer. Average temperatures in the municipality range between 18 and 22 °C (64–72 °F), and average annual precipitation ranges between 700 and 1,000 millimetres (28–39 in).

Climate data for Tanhuato weather station at 20°16′55″N 102°19′55″W, 1542 m above sea level (1981–2010 averages, 1951–2010 extremes)
Month	Jan	Feb	Mar	Apr	May	Jun	Jul	Aug	Sep	Oct	Nov	Dec	Year
Record high °C (°F)	40.0 (104.0)	39.0 (102.2)	42.0 (107.6)	44.0 (111.2)	44.0 (111.2)	42.0 (107.6)	42.0 (107.6)	38.0 (100.4)	40.0 (104.0)	39.0 (102.2)	39.0 (102.2)	37.0 (98.6)	44.0 (111.2)
Mean daily maximum °C (°F)	27.9 (82.2)	29.0 (84.2)	32.1 (89.8)	33.1 (91.6)	34.4 (93.9)	32.7 (90.9)	31.5 (88.7)	31.6 (88.9)	31.3 (88.3)	31.0 (87.8)	30.1 (86.2)	28.4 (83.1)	31.1 (88.0)
Daily mean °C (°F)	16.6 (61.9)	17.7 (63.9)	20.3 (68.5)	21.9 (71.4)	23.4 (74.1)	23.2 (73.8)	22.4 (72.3)	22.5 (72.5)	22.0 (71.6)	21.2 (70.2)	19.4 (66.9)	17.2 (63.0)	20.7 (69.3)
Mean daily minimum °C (°F)	5.4 (41.7)	6.4 (43.5)	8.5 (47.3)	10.6 (51.1)	12.3 (54.1)	13.6 (56.5)	13.3 (55.9)	13.4 (56.1)	12.8 (55.0)	11.4 (52.5)	8.7 (47.7)	6.1 (43.0)	10.2 (50.4)
Record low °C (°F)	−3.0 (26.6)	−3.0 (26.6)	0.0 (32.0)	1.4 (34.5)	4.0 (39.2)	4.0 (39.2)	4.0 (39.2)	5.0 (41.0)	3.0 (37.4)	2.0 (35.6)	−2.0 (28.4)	−4.0 (24.8)	−4.0 (24.8)
Average precipitation mm (inches)	4.8 (0.19)	2.5 (0.10)	0.1 (0.00)	0.5 (0.02)	13.0 (0.51)	71.9 (2.83)	100.7 (3.96)	71.3 (2.81)	77.1 (3.04)	19.8 (0.78)	2.9 (0.11)	1.6 (0.06)	366.2 (14.42)
Average rainy days (≥ 1 mm)	0.8	0.7	0.1	0.4	1.2	8.0	12.8	12.0	9.6	3.4	0.8	1.0	50.8
Source: Servicio Meteorológico Nacional

== History ==
The place name Tanhuato is of Chichimeca origin, meaning "near the hill". In pre-Hispanic times the area was part of the Purépecha Empire.

Tanhuato was one of the original municipalities established in Michoacán in 1831. The municipality was disestablished and incorporated into Yurécuaro at various periods in the 19th century (1856–1861, 1863–1868, and 1874–1877). In 1902, the municipal seat was renamed Tanhuato de Guerrero in honour of former Mexican president Vicente Guerrero.

== Administration ==
The municipal government of Tanhuato comprises a president, a councillor (Spanish: síndico), and seven trustees (regidores), four elected by relative majority and three by proportional representation. The current president of the municipality is Héctor Daniel Aranda Pérez.

== Demographics ==
In the 2010 Mexican Census, the municipality of Tanhuato recorded a population of 15,176 inhabitants living in 3767 households. The 2015 Intercensal Survey estimated a population of 15,352 inhabitants in Tanhuato.

INEGI lists 18 localities in the municipality, of which only the municipal seat Tanhuato de Guerrero is classified as urban. It recorded a population of 9546 inhabitants in the 2010 Census.

== Economy and infrastructure ==
Agriculture is the main economic activity in Tanhuato. Major crops grown include wheat, sorghum, corn, vegetables (e.g., chiles and hydroponically grown tomatoes), blue agave and beans. Tanhuato is particularly known for its alfalfa and chickpea production. Livestock raised include cattle, pigs, goats, poultry and bees.

The toll expressway Federal Highway 15D runs through the municipality, as does Federal Highway 110.
