= Yurécuaro =

- town
- Coat of arms
- Interactive map of Yurécuaro
- Coordinates: 20°16′55″N 102°19′55″W
- Country: Mexico
- State: Michoacán

Government
  - Mayor: Jaime Perez

Population (2005)
  - Total: 30,487
- Time zone: UTC-6 (CST)

Yurécuaro is a town and a municipality in the region of the Chapala cienega at the north-west in the Mexican state of Michoacán, at a height of 1530 meters (5065 ft) above sea level. Its limits to the north with the state of Jalisco separated by the Lerma river, at west with La Piedad, at south with Ecuandureo and to the southeast with Tanhuato. The distance to the state capital Morelia is 125 miles (201 km) and to Guadalajara is 85 miles (137 km).

== Etymology ==
Yurécuaro comes from the Purepecha iorekuarhu meaning "riverside" or "place of growing".

== History ==
The city was founded May 22, 1559 by Viceroy Don Luis de Velasco.

== Transportation ==
Transport routes in Yurécuaro include:

- Road state 110 east to La Piedad west La Barca
- Road Yurecuaro-La Concepcion, Jalisco
- Zamora-Yurecuaro toll expressway (under planning)
- Train Mexico-Guadalajara and Yurecuaro-Zamora
