= Ixtlán, Michoacan =

Ixtlán
- Municipality
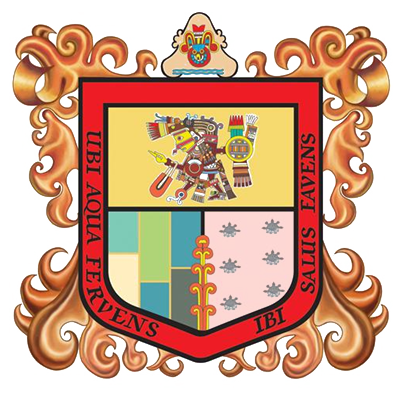
- Coat of arms

- Location in Mexico Ixtlán (Mexico)
- Country: Mexico
- State: Michoacán
- Demonym: (in Spanish)
- Time zone: UTC−6 (CST)

Ixtlán Municipality
- Municipality
- Location of Ixtlán in Mexico
- Coordinates: 20°10′N 102°24′W
- Country: Mexico
- State: Michoacán
- Established: 1831
- Municipal seat: Ixtlán de los Hervores

Government
  - Municipal president: Cesar Enoc Tamayo Herrera (PRIAN)

Area
  - Total: 124.36 km^{2} (48.02 sq mi)
- Elevation: 1,530 m (5,020 ft)

Population (2020)
  - Total: 14,302
  - Density: 115.00/km^{2} (297.86/sq mi)
- Time zone: UTC-6 (CST)

== Political entity ==
The municipality is located in the northwest of the state, 174 km from the state capital of Morelia. It has a territory of 124.36 square kilometres, bordering the municipalities of Tanhuato, Ecuandureo, Chavinda, Zamora, Pajacuarán and Vista Hermosa. The seat is Ixtlán de los Hervores. This seat serves as the local government for the entire territory, with a municipal president, a syndic, and 7 representatives called regidors. Other principal communities include La Plaza del Limón, La Estanzuela, San Simón and Valenciano. The main economic activities of the municipalities are farming, ranching and commerce.

== Geography ==
It has an average altitude of 1,530 meters above sea level, being on the north of the Trans-Mexican Volcanic Belt and the Lerma-Chapala Depression. There are some elevations including the hills called El Comalito, Divisadero, Gordo, Encinal and Coyote.

=== Hydrography ===
The municipality's surface water includes the Duero River, a stream called Chavinda and springs such as Pozo Verde, Pozo Blanco, Pocito, Carbón and Coyote.

=== Climate ===
Climate is temperate with temperatures that range between 2.5 and 36.0 degrees C. Climate depends on the seasons; in the spring it is hot; in the summer and autumn it is humid; and in the winter it is cold. The annual average rainfall is 800.0mm.

=== Flora and fauna ===
The ecosystem is dominated by grassland vegetation with species such as huisache, mesquite, nopal, linaloe and shrubland. Typical fauna includes species such as deer, rabbit, hare, squirrel, foxes and badger.

== History ==
It was inhabited by native tribes, and during the pre-Hispanic period, Ixtlán was part of the territory of Tototlán in the Valley of Cuina. It is not until 1598 when Lucas Carrillo founded it as a town in the 16th century after the Spanish conquest. Eventually the place became a curate and in 1831 Ixtlán became a municipality of Michoacán.
