= Ixtlán de los Hervores =

City in Michoacán, Mexico

Coordinates: 20°11′N 102°24′W

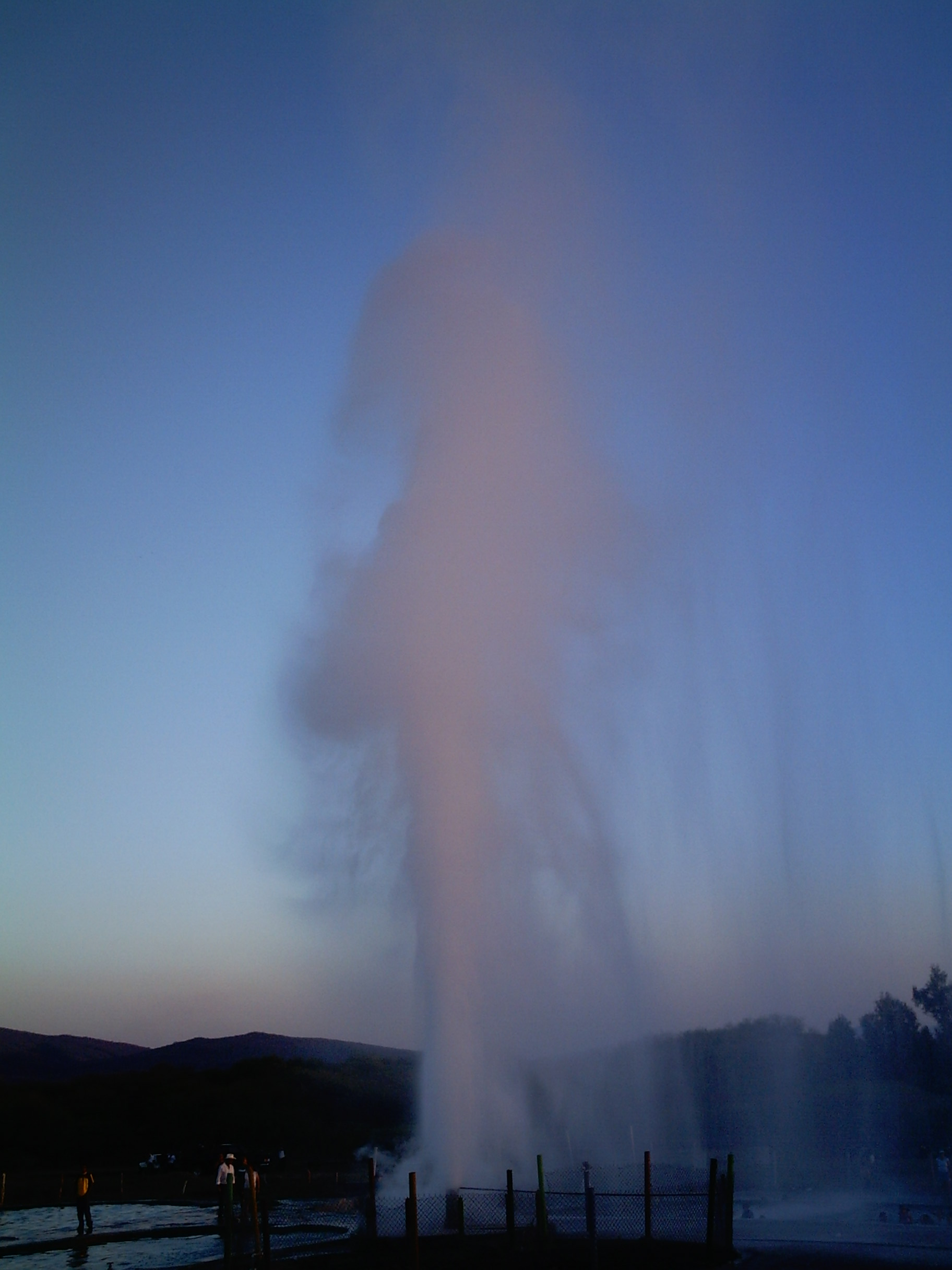
Ixtlan Geyser

Ixtlán de los Hervores, also known as Ixtlán, is a city in the Mexican state of Michoacán. It is located 29 kilometres (18 mi) from Jiquilpan by state highway 16 and 26 kilometres (16 mi) to the northeast of the city of Zamora by way of highway 35. It is about 80 miles (130 km) southeast of Guadalajara.

Ixtlán de los Hervores is known for its thermal water springs. In Ixtlán de los Hervores one will find three geysers that surges up from the depths of the earth with tremendous pressure. The jet rises more than 30 metres (98 ft) in height and reaches temperatures of 96 °C (205 °F). There are two new geysers, one near the soccer field. A rustic spa has been built near the geyser with services for people who are seeking the healing powers of sulphurous waters found here.
