= Ecuandureo =

Coordinates: 20.1667°N 102.2000°W

- Municipality
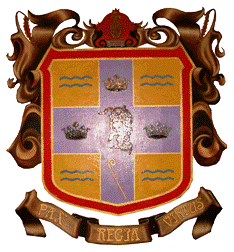
- Coat of arms

- Location in Mexico Ecuandureo (Mexico)
- Country: Mexico
- State: Michoacán
- Demonym: (in Spanish)
- Time zone: UTC−6 (CST)

Ecuandureo is a municipality in the Mexican state of Michoacán. It is located in the northwestern part of the state and its head is the town of Ecuandureo.

== See also ==
- 2015 Michoacán shootout
- El Colecio
- Municipalities of Michoacán
