= 1954–55 Mexican Segunda División season =

Segunda División de México
- Season: 1954–55
- Champions: Atlas (1st Title)
- Matches played: 182
- Goals scored: 604 (3.32 per match)

The 1954–55 Mexican Segunda División was the fifth season of the Mexican Segunda División. The season started on 9 August 1954 and concluded on 8 May 1955. It was won by Atlas.

== Changes ==
- Irapuato F.C. was promoted to Primera División.
- Atlas F.C. was relegated from Primera División.
- UNAM, Laguna, Celaya, IPN and Independiente Toluca entered the league.
- Estrella Roja and Moctezuma de Orizaba have dissolved.
- Oviedo Pachuca was put on hiatus for the 1954–55 season.

== Teams ==
1954-55 Season Teams

Club	City	Stadium
Anáhuac	Monterrey	Estadio Tecnológico
Atlas	Guadalajara	Parque Oro
Celaya	Celaya	Estadio Miguel Alemán Valdés
Cuautla	Cuautla	Balneario El Almeal
Independiente	Toluca	Héctor Barraza
IPN	Mexico City	Estadio Olímpico Universitario
La Piedad	La Piedad	Estadio Juan N. López
Laguna	Torreón	Estadio San Isidro
Monterrey	Monterrey	Estadio Tecnológico
Morelia	Morelia	Campo Morelia
Querétaro	Querétaro	Estadio Municipal
San Sebastián	León	Estadio La Martinica
UNAM	Mexico City	Estadio Olímpico Universitario
Zamora	Zamora	Parque Juan Carreño

== League table ==
Pos	Team	Pld	W	D	L	GF	GA	GAv	Pts	Promotion or relegation
1	Atlas (C, P)	26	17	5	4	67	25	2.680	39	Promotion to Primera División
2	Cuautla (P)	26	13	6	7	53	40	1.325	32	Promotion Playoff to Primera División
3	Zamora (P)	26	14	3	9	44	34	1.294	31	Promotion Playoff to Primera División
4	Querétaro	26	13	5	8	50	44	1.136	31	Promotion Playoff to Primera División
5	Laguna	26	12	6	8	47	34	1.382	30	
6	Morelia	26	11	7	8	51	35	1.457	29	
7	Anáhuac	26	10	6	10	42	45	0.933	26	
8	La Piedad	26	11	4	11	49	55	0.891	26	
9	Monterrey	26	10	6	10	31	40	0.775	26	
10	San Sebastián	26	10	5	11	37	46	0.804	25	
11	Celaya	26	8	5	13	36	55	0.655	21	
12	Independiente	26	7	3	16	43	51	0.843	17	
13	IPN	26	6	4	16	29	52	0.558	16	
14	UNAM	26	6	3	17	25	48	0.521	15	

Source: RSSSF
(C) Champions; (P) Promoted

== Results ==
Home \ Away	ANA	ATL	CEL	CUA	IND	IPN	LPD	LAG	MON	MOR	QUE	SSE	UNM	ZAM
Anáhuac	—	1–4	1–2	1–3	3–1	4–1	1–0	1–3	1–1	3–3	0–2	2–0	2–1	1–1
Atlas	4–2	—	1–1	3–0	3–2	2–0	6–0	2–0	4–0	2–2	6–1	6–2	5–2	4–0
Celaya	0–0	0–1	—	2–3	1–1	1–0	2–4	0–0	3–5	3–2	0–4	1–2	2–0	1–0
Cuautla	2–0	1–1	3–1	—	4–1	1–0	5–5	3–0	2–1	1–1	4–0	3–1	2–1	1–2
Independiente	3–0	0–2	0–2	0–0	—	3–4	1–2	2–3	2–0	1–2	2–1	5–0	3–1	4–2
IPN	2–3	0–3	3–2	2–1	3–3	—	1–0	0–4	0–1	3–1	1–2	1–2	0–1	1–0
La Piedad	3–2	1–2	5–1	2–2	4–1	1–0	—	1–3	5–2	2–3	2–1	2–2	2–0	3–2
Laguna	2–3	1–1	1–2	2–3	2–0	3–1	6–0	—	0–1	0–0	2–1	0–0	3–1	1–0
Monterrey	0–2	1–0	2–1	1–1	3–1	2–2	1–1	0–2	—	2–1	1–1	0–0	3–1	1–0
Morelia	1–1	1–1	7–1	2–4	2–1	4–0	3–0	4–1	2–0	—	5–2	1–0	5–1	2–1
Querétaro	1–2	2–1	3–0	3–2	2–1	2–2	1–0	2–2	3–0	2–0	—	2–2	5–1	2–1
San Sebastián	1–3	2–1	2–2	1–0	1–3	2–1	4–1	2–2	0–1	2–0	4–2	—	2–1	2–1
UNAM	2–2	0–2	2–4	2–0	2–0	1–1	1–2	0–2	2–1	0–0	0–1	2–0	—	2–1
Zamora	2–0	3–0	3–1	2–0	2–1	3–0	2–1	3–2	2–1	2–1	2–2	1–0	3–0	—

Source: RSSSF
Legend: Blue = home team win; Yellow = draw; Red = away team win.

== Promotion Playoff ==
For the 1955-56 season it was decided to expand the First Division from 12 to 14 teams. A promotion consisting of five clubs was organized: 2 from the First Division and 3 from the Second. The classified teams were: Atlante and Marte from Primera División and Cuautla, Zamora and Querétaro from Second Division. Atlante remained at the First Division, Zamora and Cuautla were promoted. Marte was relegated to Segunda División and Querétaro remained at the same league.

Pos	Team	Pld	W	D	L	GF	GA	GD	Pts	Promotion	ATE	ZAM	CUA	MAR	QUE
1	Atlante	4	3	1	0	13	4	+9	7	Stayed at the same Division		2–1	3–0		6–1
2	Zamora (P)	4	2	0	2	8	8	0	4	Promoted to Primera División			4–3	3–1	0–2
3	Cuautla (P)	4	2	0	2	8	10	−2	4	Promoted to Primera División				4–3	1–0
4	Marte (R)	4	1	1	2	9	9	0	3	Relegated to Segunda División	2–2				3–0
5	Querétaro	4	1	0	3	3	10	−7	2	Stayed at the same Division					

Source: RSSSF
Rules for classification: 1st points; 2nd head-to-head points; 3rd head-to-head goal difference; 4th head-to-head goals scored; 5th goal difference; 6th number of goals scored
(P) Promoted; (R) Relegated
