= 1955–56 Mexican Segunda División season =

Segunda División de México
- Season: 1955–56
- Champions: Monterrey (1st Title)
- Matches played: 156
- Goals scored: 480 (3.08 per match)

The 1955–56 Mexican Segunda División was the sixth season of the Mexican Segunda División. The season started on 10 July 1955 and concluded on 16 January 1956. It was won by Monterrey.

== Changes ==
- Atlas, Zamora and Cuautla were promoted to Primera División.
- C.D. Marte was relegated from Primera División.
- C.D. Anáhuac have dissolved.
- Oviedo returned after one season on hiatus, however, the team was relocated in Tlalnepantla de Baz.
- Montecarlo de Irapuato joined the league.

== Teams ==
1955-56 Season Teams

Club	City	Stadium
Celaya	Celaya	Estadio Miguel Alemán Valdés
Independiente	Toluca	Estadio Héctor Barraza
IPN	Mexico City	Estadio Olímpico Universitario
La Piedad	La Piedad	Estadio Juan N. López
Laguna	Torreón	Estadio San Isidro
Marte	Cuernavaca	Deportivo Morelos
Montecarlo	Irapuato	Estadio Revolución
Monterrey	Monterrey	Estadio Tecnológico
Morelia	Morelia	Campo Morelia
Oviedo	Tlalnepantla	Campo Tlalnepantla
Querétaro	Querétaro	Estadio Municipal
San Sebastián	León	Estadio La Martinica
UNAM	Mexico City	Estadio Olímpico Universitario

== League table ==
Pos	Team	Pld	W	D	L	GF	GA	GAv	Pts	Qualification or relegation
1	Monterrey (C, P)	24	13	8	3	42	31	1.355	34	Promoted to Primera División
2	La Piedad	24	13	7	4	40	24	1.667	33	
3	Morelia	24	13	6	5	38	20	1.900	32	
4	Celaya	24	13	6	5	41	26	1.577	32	
5	Querétaro	24	12	7	5	53	28	1.893	31	
6	Laguna	24	12	4	8	48	33	1.455	28	
7	Montecarlo	24	13	1	10	44	40	1.100	27	
8	UNAM	24	8	6	10	32	35	0.914	22	
9	IPN	24	6	9	9	30	34	0.882	21	
10	San Sebastián	24	6	7	11	34	42	0.810	19	
11	Oviedo	24	5	4	15	27	42	0.643	14	
12	Independiente	24	4	4	16	28	54	0.519	12	
13	Marte	24	1	5	18	23	71	0.324	7	

Source: RSSSF
(C) Champions; (P) Promoted

== Results ==
Home \ Away	CEL	IND	IPN	LPD	LAG	MAR	MOC	MON	MOR	OVI	QUE	SSE	UNM
Celaya	—	0–0	2–1	2–0	3–2	4–1	3–2	0–0	2–1	3–1	1–2	2–0	1–0
Independiente	0–2	—	2–2	1–2	2–4	6–1	0–2	0–4	2–3	2–3	1–4	1–0	3–1
IPN	1–1	1–2	—	1–3	0–0	0–0	2–3	1–1	1–2	2–1	1–1	1–3	1–1
La Piedad	1–1	1–0	2–3	—	3–1	3–1	2–0	2–2	3–1	2–1	1–1	2–1	2–0
Laguna	1–1	8–1	2–1	1–1	—	5–1	6–3	0–0	2–1	3–0	2–1	3–0	2–3
Marte	1–2	2–2	1–1	0–2	0–2	—	1–2	4–7	1–2	3–2	1–2	2–2	0–2
Montecarlo	2–1	3–0	1–3	1–0	2–0	3–0	—	3–2	1–0	3–2	1–2	4–1	1–3
Monterrey	2–1	3–2	2–1	0–0	2–0	2–0	3–2	—	1–0	0–0	2–2	1–0	2–1
Morelia	1–0	2–0	1–1	1–0	2–0	4–1	2–1	5–0	—	4–1	0–0	1–0	2–0
Oviedo	0–1	3–1	0–1	1–2	2–1	2–0	0–1	1–2	1–1	—	1–0	1–2	1–1
Querétaro	3–2	2–0	1–2	2–2	3–0	10–0	3–1	1–2	0–0	4–2	—	1–1	5–2
San Sebastián	4–4	1–0	1–2	1–1	1–2	2–2	1–1	4–1	1–1	3–1	3–1	—	1–2
UNAM	1–3	0–0	1–0	1–3	1–2	2–0	3–1	1–1	1–1	0–0	0–2	5–1	—

Source: RSSSF
Legend: Blue = home team win; Yellow = draw; Red = away team win.
