= 1979–80 Mexican Segunda División season =

Segunda División de México
- Season: 1979–80
- Champions: Atletas Campesinos (1st Title)
- Promoted: Lobos de Tlaxcala; SUOO; Cachorros León
- Relegated: UV Coatzacoalcos
- Matches played: 578
- Goals scored: 1,578 (2.73 per match)
- Top goalscorer: Mario Díaz Beltrán (34 goals)

The 1979–80 Segunda División was the 31st season of the Mexican Segunda División. The season started on 14 July 1979 and concluded on 22 June 1980. It was won by Atletas Campesinos.

== Changes ==
- Atlas was promoted to Primera División.
- Veracruz was relegated from Primera División.
- Lobos de Tlaxcala, SUOO and Cachorros León were promoted from Tercera División.
- Morelos was relegated from Segunda División.
- Nacional was bought by new owners, the team was relocated to Tulancingo and renamed as Titanes de Tulancingo.
- UV Córdoba was moved to Xalapa and renamed as Universidad Veracruzana.

== Teams ==
1979–80 season Teams

Club	City	Stadium
Atletas Campesinos	Querétaro City	Estadio Municipal de Querétaro
Atletas Industriales	Querétaro City	Estadio Municipal de Querétaro
Atlético Morelia	Morelia	Estadio Venustiano Carranza
Bachilleres	Guadalajara	Estadio Tecnológico U. de G.
Cachorros León	León	Estadio Nou Camp
Colima	Colima City	Estadio Colima
Coyotes Neza	Ciudad Nezahualcóyotl	Estadio Metropolitano
Cuautla	Cuautla	Estadio Isidro Gil Tapia
Estado de México	Toluca	Estadio Toluca 70
Irapuato	Irapuato	Estadio Irapuato
La Piedad	La Piedad	Estadio Juan N. López
Lobos de Tlaxcala	Tlaxcala City	Estadio Tlahuicole
Nuevo Necaxa	Juan Galindo	Estadio 14 de Diciembre
Pachuca	Pachuca	Estadio Revolución Mexicana
Salamanca	Salamanca	Estadio El Molinito
SUOO	Cuautitlán	Estadio Los Pinos
Tapatío	Guadalajara	Casa Club Guadalajara
Tepic	Tepic	Estadio Nicolás Álvarez Ortega
Tuberos de Veracruz	Veracruz City	Estadio Luis "Pirata" Fuente
Tulancingo	Tulancingo	Estadio Primero de Mayo
UV	Xalapa	Estadio Antonio M. Quirasco
UV Coatzacoalcos	Coatzacoalcos	Estadio Miguel Hidalgo
Veracruz	Veracruz City	Estadio Luis "Pirata" Fuente
Zamora	Zamora	Estadio 20 de Noviembre

== Group stage ==
=== Group 1 ===
Pos	Team	Pld	W	D	L	GF	GA	GD	Pts	Qualification or relegation
1	Atletas Campesinos (Q)	46	22	9	15	68	47	+21	63	Qualified to Playoffs
2	Nuevo Necaxa (Q)	46	19	13	14	64	52	+12	59	Qualified to Playoffs
3	Veracruz	46	19	10	17	64	63	+1	57	
4	Cuautla	46	18	13	15	63	61	+2	55	
5	Cachorros León	46	12	10	24	72	90	−18	43	
6	Bachilleres	46	12	14	20	50	72	−22	40	

Source: RSSSF
(Q) Qualified for the phase indicated

=== Group 2 ===
Pos	Team	Pld	W	D	L	GF	GA	GD	Pts	Qualification or relegation
1	Salamanca (Q)	46	24	13	9	73	42	+31	74	Qualified to Playoffs
2	Colima (Q)	46	23	10	13	76	50	+26	68	Qualified to Playoffs
3	SUOO	46	19	6	21	57	59	−2	53	
4	Atlético Morelia	46	13	17	16	56	51	+5	52	
5	Coyotes Neza	46	14	13	19	65	73	−8	48	
6	Zamora	46	14	13	19	47	64	−17	47	

Source: RSSSF
(Q) Qualified for the phase indicated

=== Group 3 ===
Pos	Team	Pld	W	D	L	GF	GA	GD	Pts	Qualification or relegation
1	Tapatío (Q)	46	22	11	13	73	56	+17	67	Qualified to Playoffs
2	Tepic (Q)	46	21	10	15	64	52	+12	64	Qualified to Playoffs
3	Lobos de Tlaxcala	46	18	11	17	79	70	+9	60	
4	La Piedad	46	19	11	16	55	57	−2	58	
5	Irapuato	46	16	16	14	57	54	+3	56	
6	Universidad Veracruzana	46	11	15	20	58	80	−22	44	

Source: RSSSF
(Q) Qualified for the phase indicated

=== Group 4 ===
Pos	Team	Pld	W	D	L	GF	GA	GD	Pts	Qualification or relegation
1	Estado de México (Q)	46	26	13	7	90	54	+36	83	Qualified to Playoffs
2	Tuberos de Veracruz (Q)	46	16	11	19	57	62	−5	52	Qualified to Playoffs
3	Tulancingo	46	14	18	14	72	83	−11	52	
4	Pachuca	46	13	15	18	58	65	−7	46	
5	Atletas Industriales	46	12	8	26	58	85	−27	40	
6	UV Coatzacoalcos	46	7	16	23	36	70	−34	33	Relegated

Source: RSSSF
(Q) Qualified for the phase indicated

== Results ==
Home \ Away	ATC	ATI	ATM	BAC	CAL	COL	COY	CUA	EDM	IRA	LPD	LBT	NEC	PAC	SAL	SUO	TAP	TEP	TUB	TUL	UV	UVC	VER	ZAM
Atletas Campesinos	—	1–0	1–0	2–1	3–2	2–1	3–0	0–1	0–0	2–1	2–1	1–1	1–0	0–0	0–0	3–0	5–1	2–0	2–1	3–3	4–0	2–0	2–1	5–0
Atletas Industriales	1–4	—	1–1	2–0	4–0	3–2	2–5	0–0	2–0	0–2	1–4	0–2	0–1	3–1	1–0	0–1	1–3	3–1	3–2	1–2	3–2	1–1	2–3	5–0
Atlético Morelia	1–0	4–0	—	1–1	1–1	3–1	2–0	1–3	1–2	2–2	5–0	2–2	2–2	2–0	1–1	0–1	1–0	0–2	0–0	1–1	2–0	3–0	2–0	0–1
Bachilleres	1–1	2–1	1–1	—	0–0	1–3	3–2	2–2	0–0	1–0	4–1	2–1	2–1	1–0	1–2	0–2	4–4	1–1	2–0	1–2	3–2	1–1	0–0	0–1
Cachorros León	2–1	5–1	2–2	2–0	—	1–2	2–3	3–1	2–4	2–0	2–2	4–2	2–2	4–4	3–2	1–2	1–1	1–2	3–1	2–4	4–0	2–0	1–2	3–0
Colima	2–2	3–1	2–1	1–0	3–1	—	2–1	0–0	5–1	2–1	2–2	2–0	3–1	5–2	2–1	1–0	4–1	2–3	0–0	1–1	2–2	4–0	3–0	0–0
Coyotes Neza	2–0	1–1	2–1	1–1	5–2	0–1	—	3–1	1–1	1–1	0–0	1–3	4–5	0–0	1–0	0–2	1–0	1–0	6–2	2–2	3–3	3–0	0–1	0–1
Cuautla	2–0	1–0	1–0	2–1	1–1	0–0	1–1	—	1–3	4–2	2–1	0–1	2–0	2–1	1–1	1–1	1–2	1–0	2–1	3–3	3–2	6–2	0–0	1–0
Estado de México	2–1	4–2	4–1	2–0	3–1	2–0	4–2	1–2	—	2–1	3–0	4–1	3–1	4–2	2–1	4–1	2–0	3–1	1–1	4–2	5–2	1–1	2–0	3–3
Irapuato	3–1	0–0	1–1	2–0	2–1	2–0	1–0	1–1	2–3	—	0–0	1–1	1–0	1–0	1–1	1–0	4–2	1–0	1–1	1–1	3–0	4–1	2–1	2–1
La Piedad	1–0	2–0	1–3	1–2	2–0	1–0	1–0	3–2	1–1	1–1	—	2–0	1–0	2–1	2–0	2–0	1–2	2–0	1–0	1–1	0–0	3–1	3–1	1–0
Lobos Tlaxcala	1–2	3–0	4–1	1–2	4–2	0–1	2–2	4–2	0–1	1–1	1–2	—	1–3	1–1	2–2	3–1	1–2	4–1	1–0	2–2	3–2	2–0	3–0	3–1
Nuevo Necaxa	1–0	5–1	1–0	1–2	1–0	3–1	0–2	2–0	0–0	1–1	0–0	1–0	—	1–1	2–2	2–2	1–3	1–0	0–0	1–1	2–1	4–1	1–0	1–1
Pachuca	0–2	1–1	0–0	5–0	2–0	2–1	4–2	2–1	1–1	4–0	2–1	0–2	1–2	—	0–2	1–0	1–1	2–1	2–2	2–2	1–1	2–1	1–2	3–0
Salamanca	3–0	3–2	0–0	3–0	3–1	2–1	1–1	2–1	0–0	2–0	1–0	3–1	2–1	1–1	—	2–1	1–0	1–0	2–1	2–0	2–2	3–1	3–0	3–0
SUOO	1–0	4–2	3–1	0–0	0–1	2–1	3–0	3–0	1–2	1–0	3–4	2–5	0–3	1–1	2–0	—	3–2	6–0	0–0	0–0	3–1	1–0	1–0	0–1
Tapatío	4–1	1–0	0–0	1–0	2–0	0–1	2–0	1–0	1–1	2–0	0–0	3–1	1–1	2–0	0–3	1–0	—	0–2	2–0	6–1	5–0	0–0	2–1	4–2
Tepic	1–1	3–0	0–1	1–1	3–0	0–3	2–2	0–0	2–1	2–1	2–1	2–0	2–0	1–0	1–0	2–0	3–1	—	2–1	6–0	4–1	1–0	2–0	0–0
Tuberos	1–0	1–1	1–0	5–3	1–0	2–2	2–0	1–0	2–0	1–3	3–0	1–2	1–3	0–1	3–1	2–0	3–2	0–0	—	3–1	2–0	3–1	1–0	2–0
Tulancingo	0–3	0–0	1–0	2–0	2–2	3–1	7–2	2–4	1–2	1–0	2–0	2–2	0–4	1–1	2–2	0–1	1–2	2–1	4–3	—	1–1	0–1	3–1	3–2
UV	0–1	2–0	2–1	3–1	1–1	0–1	0–1	0–1	0–0	3–0	1–0	2–2	0–0	3–1	0–0	2–0	1–1	1–3	1–0	3–1	—	0–0	4–2	3–2
UV Coatzacoalcos	1–1	0–3	2–3	1–1	4–1	1–0	0–0	3–2	0–0	1–1	2–0	1–2	1–0	0–1	0–1	4–0	0–0	0–0	0–0	0–1	1–1	—	1–2	1–1
Veracruz	1–0	2–0	0–0	3–0	4–1	0–2	1–0	4–1	3–2	1–1	4–1	2–0	2–0	3–1	1–3	2–1	0–0	3–3	2–0	3–3	2–2	0–0	—	2–1
Zamora	2–1	0–3	1–1	2–1	1–0	0–0	0–1	0–0	2–0	1–1	0–0	1–1	1–2	2–0	0–3	1–0	2–3	1–1	4–0	2–0	3–1	3–0	2–2	—

Source: RSSSF
Legend: Blue = home team win; Yellow = draw; Red = away team win.

== Final stage ==
=== Group 1 ===
Pos	Team	Pld	W	D	L	GF	GA	GD	Pts	Promotion	ATC	TAP	COL	TUB
1	Atletas Campesinos (Q)	6	5	0	1	13	3	+10	13	Qualified to Final		2–1	3–0	3–0
2	Tapatío	6	2	1	3	9	10	−1	6		1–2		0–2	4–2
3	Colima	6	1	3	2	6	10	−4	6		0–3	2–2		2–2
4	Tuberos de Veracruz	6	1	2	3	5	10	−5	4		1–0	0–1	0–0	

Source: RSSSF
Rules for classification: 1st points; 2nd head-to-head points; 3rd head-to-head goal difference; 4th head-to-head goals scored; 5th goal difference; 6th number of goals scored
(Q) Qualified for the phase indicated

=== Group 2 ===
Pos	Team	Pld	W	D	L	GF	GA	GD	Pts	Promotion	EDM	NEC	TEP	SAL
1	Estado de México (Q)	6	4	1	1	11	3	+8	12	Qualified to Final		2–0	4–0	2–0
2	Nuevo Necaxa	6	5	0	1	11	4	+7	12		2–1		4–0	2–0
3	Tepic	6	1	1	4	6	12	−6	4		1–2	0–1		4–0
4	Salamanca	6	0	2	4	2	11	−9	2		0–0	1–2	1–1	

Source: RSSSF
Rules for classification: 1st points; 2nd head-to-head points; 3rd head-to-head goal difference; 4th head-to-head goals scored; 5th goal difference; 6th number of goals scored
(Q) Qualified for the phase indicated

=== Final ===
June 15, 1980

Atletas Campesinos	0–0	Estado de México
	Report

Estadio Municipal de Querétaro, Querétaro City

June 22, 1980

Estado de México	1–2	Atletas Campesinos
De la Torre 71'	Report	Carlos Cerritos 28'; Jorge Gaspar 80'

Estadio Toluca 70, Toluca
