= 1956–57 Mexican Segunda División season =

Segunda División de México
- Season: 1956–57
- Champions: Zamora (1st Title)
- Matches played: 156
- Goals scored: 435 (2.79 per match)

The 1956–57 Mexican Segunda División was the seventh season of the Mexican Segunda División. The season started on 15 July 1956 and concluded on 20 January 1957. It was won by Zamora.

== Changes ==
- Monterrey was promoted to Primera División.
- Zamora was relegated from Primera División.
- Nacional de Guadalajara and Refinería Madero joined the league.
- Independiente de Toluca have dissolved.

== Teams ==
1956-57 Season Teams

Club	City	Stadium
Celaya	Celaya	Estadio Miguel Alemán Valdés
IPN	Mexico City	Estadio Olímpico Universitario
La Piedad	La Piedad	Estadio Juan N. López
Laguna	Torreón	Estadio San Isidro
Marte	Cuernavaca	Deportivo Morelos
Montecarlo	Irapuato	Estadio Revolución
Morelia	Morelia	Campo Morelia
Nacional	Guadalajara	Parque Oro
Oviedo	Tlalnepantla	Campo Tlalnepantla
Querétaro	Querétaro	Estadio Municipal
Refinería Madero	Ciudad Madero	Estadio Tampico
San Sebastián	León	Estadio La Martinica
UNAM	Mexico City	Estadio Olímpico Universitario
Zamora	Zamora	Estadio Moctezuma

== League table ==
Pos	Team	Pld	W	D	L	GF	GA	GAv	Pts	Qualification or relegation
1	Zamora (C, P)	24	15	4	5	40	18	2.222	34	Promoted to Primera División
2	Morelia (Note: Morelia was promoted after Puebla requested not to play for the 1957–58 season) (P)	24	14	5	5	46	24	1.917	33	Promoted to Primera División
3	San Sebastián	24	11	10	3	39	21	1.857	32	
4	Laguna	24	11	6	7	55	43	1.279	28	
5	Nacional	24	10	6	8	45	30	1.500	26	
6	Celaya	24	10	6	8	31	28	1.107	26	
7	Montecarlo	24	11	4	9	31	28	1.107	26	
8	La Piedad	24	9	5	10	28	25	1.120	23	
9	Refinería Madero	24	9	5	10	27	41	0.659	23	
10	Querétaro	24	7	7	10	28	31	0.903	21	
11	IPN	24	4	7	13	20	35	0.571	15	
12	UNAM	24	4	5	15	24	55	0.436	13	
13	Oviedo	24	4	4	16	21	56	0.375	12	
14	Marte (Note: Marte was disqualified from the league after 19 games due to the improper alignment of two footballers.)	0	0	0	0	0	0	—	0	Disqualified

Source: RSSSF
(C) Champions; (P) Promoted

== Results ==
Home \ Away	CEL	IPN	LPD	LAG	MOC	MOR	NAC	OVI	QUE	RMA	SSE	UNM	ZAM
Celaya	—	3–1	2–0	2–0	3–0	0–2	1–1	1–0	0–0	0–0	0–0	2–0	3–1
IPN	0–2	—	0–1	0–2	0–1	0–0	0–0	1–3	2–0	1–2	1–1	0–0	0–1
La Piedad	2–0	4–0	—	1–1	3–0	0–1	0–0	5–0	1–0	1–3	0–0	3–0	0–1
Laguna	2–2	3–1	4–0	—	2–1	2–1	2–2	4–0	2–2	5–1	2–2	4–0	1–3
Montecarlo	3–0	1–1	3–0	0–2	—	2–0	1–0	5–1	0–2	1–2	2–1	2–1	0–0
Morelia	3–2	1–1	3–1	4–3	4–0	—	2–0	6–0	1–0	3–1	1–1	2–0	0–1
Nacional	1–2	1–2	0–1	4–3	1–0	5–3	—	6–2	2–0	3–0	2–0	7–2	1–1
Oviedo	2–2	1–0	1–5	2–5	0–1	0–1	0–1	—	0–3	0–1	0–1	4–1	1–0
Querétaro	2–1	2–2	0–0	4–0	0–1	2–2	0–5	2–2	—	3–1	1–2	2–1	1–0
Refinería Madero	3–1	1–0	0–0	0–2	2–2	1–2	1–0	1–1	3–1	—	1–1	2–0	0–5
San Sebastián	1–0	2–1	2–0	6–0	3–2	1–1	1–0	2–0	0–0	2–0	—	6–1	1–2
UNAM	1–2	2–4	2–0	2–2	0–3	1–2	2–2	1–1	2–1	2–0	1–1	—	2–0
Zamora	3–0	1–2	2–1	2–1	0–0	1–0	4–1	1–0	1–0	4–1	2–2	4–0	—

Source: RSSSF
Legend: Blue = home team win; Yellow = draw; Red = away team win.
