= Antonio Carbajal =

Mexican footballer (1929–2023)

- Carbajal with the Mexico national football team

Personal information
- Full name: Antonio Carbajal Rodríguez
- Date of birth: 7 June 1929
- Place of birth: Mexico City, Mexico
- Date of death: 9 May 2023 (aged 93)
- Place of death: León, Guanajuato, Mexico
- Height: 1.81 m (5 ft 11 in)
- Position: Goalkeeper

Senior career*
Years	Team	Apps	(Gls)
1948–1950	Club España	45	(0)
1950–1966	León	364	(0)
Total		409	(0)

International career
1950–1966	Mexico	48	(0)

Managerial career
- 1969: León
- 1970–1972: León
- 1974–1977: Unión de Curtidores
- 1978–1979: León
- 1979–1981: Mexico (assistant coach)
- 1980: Atletas Campesinos
- 1985–1995: Atlético Morelia
- * Club domestic league appearances and goals

Antonio "Tota" Carbajal Rodríguez (Spanish pronunciation: [anˈtonjo kaɾβaˈxal]; 7 June 1929 – 9 May 2023) was a Mexican professional footballer who played as a goalkeeper. He was also called "El Cinco Copas", in reference to his record of having played five World Cups.

== Club career ==
Born in Mexico City, Carbajal became a professional footballer with the local Club España in 1948, after having been in the squad that participated at the Olympic tournament in 1948. After the disappearance of España in 1950, he joined Club León, where he would remain until the end of his career.

== International career ==
Carbajal made his international debut with the Mexico national team in the Maracanã Stadium in Rio de Janeiro on 24 June 1950, against World Cup hosts Brazil. He was the youngest goalkeeper to play in that tournament, at the age of 21. He appeared in one match at the 1954 World Cup, against France, and in three at the 1958 tournament; at the 1962 World Cup in Chile, he became the first footballer ever to appear in four World Cups, also helping his team win its first-ever World Cup match when they defeated Czechoslovakia 3–1 in the first round. Four years later Carbajal, aged 37, established another landmark with his fifth World Cup appearance, being chosen as the starting keeper for his team's final group stage appearance, a 0–0 draw against Uruguay, to honor the occasion. In total, Carbajal appeared in 48 international matches for Mexico. In 11 World Cup matches from 1950 to 1966, he conceded 25 goals, a record that was tied by Saudi goalkeeper Mohamed Al-Deayea in 2002, in 10 matches across three tournaments (1994, 1998 and 2002); the heavy 8–0 loss to Germany in the 2002 tournament factored heavily into this. Along with German goalkeeper Manuel Neuer, he also holds the record for most consecutive World Cup appearances without a clean sheet (10).

Carbajal's record of appearing at five World Cup tournaments stood unmatched for over 30 years, when it was equalled by German midfielder Lothar Matthäus in 1998. It has since been emulated by his compatriot Rafael Márquez in 2018, in 2022 by Argentine Lionel Messi, Portuguese Cristiano Ronaldo and another compatriot in Andrés Guardado; another compatriot of Carbajal, Guillermo Ochoa, also a goalkeeper, was also called up for five World Cups, but did not play in the 2006 and 2010 tournaments. In 2015 Homare Sawa and Formiga became the first footballers to appear for a record sixth time at the 2015 FIFA Women's World Cup in Canada.

== Managerial career ==
After retiring as a player, he became a manager in the 1960s, 1970s, 1980s, and 1990s with Club León, Unión de Curtidores, Atletas Campesinos and Atlético Morelia. He twice won both the Copa México as Campeón de Campeones with Club Leon in the early 1970s. Then he managed Unión de Curtidores in the only two seasons this club advanced to the play-offs, and was awarded Primera División's best coach one time. He achieved the championship in Segunda División with Atletas Campesinos in partnership with Antonio Ascencio.

During the 1984–85 season, Carbajal was appointed as manager for Atlético Morelia; he helped the team avoid relegation in his first season. He went on to manage the team for over a decade, where the team qualified various times to the postseason, including two semi-finals.

== Personal life and death ==
Carbajal died on 9 May 2023, at the age of 93. He had been hospitalised the week prior with blood pressure problems. From January 2023 until his death in May 2023, Carbajal was the last surviving player from the 1950 World Cup.

== Managerial statistics ==
	From	To	Record							
G	From	To	Pld	W	D	L	Win %	GF	GA	+/-
León^{1}	1969	1969	18	9	4	5	50%	27	18	+9
León^{2}	1970	1972	82	36	24	22	43.9%	154	109	+45
Unión de Curtidores^{3}	1974	1977	156	49	52	55	31.4%	222	214	+8
León^{4}	1978	1979	18	9	1	8	50%	23	29	-6
Atletas Campesinos^{5}	1980	22 June 1980	8	6	1	1	75%	15	4	+11
Atlético Morelia^{6}	5 January 1985	23 September 1995	440	139	149	152	31.6%	589	629	-40
Career			722	248	231	243	34.3%	1030	1003	+27

^{1}Includes results from season 1969-1970 Primera División de México & cup tournament

^{2}Includes only results from 1970 to 1971 & 1971-72 Primera División de México (regular seasons and play-offs), cup tournaments and Campeón de Campeones. It does not include results from Torneo México 70 and 1972-73 Primera División de México's season

^{3}Includes results from Primera División de México (regular seasons and play-offs) and cup tournaments

^{4}Includes only results from 1978 to 1979 Primera División de México. It does not include results from 1979 to 1980 Primera División de México

^{5}Includes only eight play-offs results from Segunda División de México

^{6}Includes results from Primera División de México (regular seasons and play-offs), cup tournaments and 1988 CONCACAF Championship

== Honours ==
=== Player ===
León

- Primera División: 1951–52, 1955–56
- Copa México: 1957–58
- Campeón de Campeones: 1955–56

Mexico

- CONCACAF Championship: 1965
- Panamerican Championship Bronze Medal: 1960

Individual

- France Football's World Cup Top-100
- FIFA Order of Merit: 1992
- IFFHS Mexican Goalkeeper of the Century
- IFFHS 15th Best Goalkeeper of the Century
- CONCACAF Team of the Century: 1998
- FIFA World Team of the 20th Century
- Placar's 100 Craques do Século
- FIFA World Cup Hall of Fame
- Los Angeles Times 10 Best Goalkeepers of All Time
- FIFA International Football Hall of Fame: 2011
- IFFHS Legend
- IFFHS CONCACAF Men's Team of All Time: 2021
- IFFHS Men's All Time Mexico Dream Team
- Liga MX Balón de Oro Trayectoria: 2021
- FIFA World Cup The Athletic’s all-time best XI

Records

- First Player To Appear In 4 FIFA World Cups
- First Player To Appear In 5 FIFA World Cups
- Youngest Goalkeeper to Play In a FIFA World Cup

=== Manager ===
León

- Copa México: 1970–71, 1971–72
- Campeón de Campeones: 1970–71, 1971–72

Atletas Campesinos

- Segunda División: 1979–80

Individual

- Mexican Primera División Best Coach: 1975–76
