= 1978–79 Mexican Segunda División season =

Segunda División de México
- Season: 1978–79
- Champions: Atlas (3rd Title)
- Promoted: Zamora; U.V. Coatzacoalcos
- Relegated: Morelos
- Matches played: 488
- Goals scored: 1,287 (2.64 per match)
- Top goalscorer: José Luis Suárez (27 goals)

The 1978–79 Segunda División was the 30th season of the Mexican Segunda División. The season started on 8 July 1978 and concluded on 22 June 1979. It was won by Atlas.

== Changes ==
- Zacatepec was promoted to Primera División.
- Atlas was relegated from Primera División.
- Zamora and U.V. Coatzacoalcos were promoted from Tercera División.
- Ciudad Victoria was relegated from Segunda División.
- Estudiantes de Querétaro and Querétaro F.C. were bought by the same businessman, after this, the new owner created two new teams called Atletas Campesinos and Atletas Industriales.
- Tecnológico de Celaya, Bravos de Ciudad Madero and Inter Acapulco have dissolved.

== Teams ==
1978–79 season Teams

Club	City	Stadium
Atlas	Guadalajara	Estadio Jalisco
Atletas Campesinos	Querétaro City	Estadio Municipal de Querétaro
Atletas Industriales	Querétaro City	Estadio Municipal de Querétaro
Atlético Morelia	Morelia	Estadio Venustiano Carranza
Bachilleres	Ocotlán	Estadio Municipal de Ocotlán
Colima	Colima City	Estadio Colima
Coyotes Neza	Ciudad Nezahualcóyotl	Estadio Metropolitano
Cuautla	Cuautla	Estadio Isidro Gil Tapia
Estado de México	Toluca	Estadio Toluca 70
Irapuato	Irapuato	Estadio Irapuato
La Piedad	La Piedad	Estadio Juan N. López
Morelos	Cuernavaca	Estadio Centenario
Nacional	Ciudad Guzmán	Estadio Municipal Santa Rosa
Nuevo Necaxa	Juan Galindo	Estadio 14 de Diciembre
Pachuca	Pachuca	Estadio Revolución Mexicana
Salamanca	Salamanca	Estadio El Molinito
Tapatío	Guadalajara	Casa Club Guadalajara
Tepic	Tepic	Estadio Nicolás Álvarez Ortega
Tuberos de Veracruz	Veracruz City	Estadio Veracruzano
U.V. Coatzacoalcos	Coatzacoalcos	Estadio Miguel Hidalgo
U.V. Córdoba	Córdoba	Estadio Rafael Murillo Vidal
Zamora	Zamora	Estadio 20 de Noviembre

== Group stage ==
=== Group 1 ===
Pos	Team	Pld	W	D	L	GF	GA	GD	Pts	Qualification or relegation
1	Atlas (Q)	42	21	11	10	69	39	+30	66	Qualified to Playoffs
2	Atlético Morelia (Q)	42	21	10	11	67	43	+24	64	Qualified to Playoffs
3	Atletas Campesinos	42	16	8	18	58	52	+6	50	
4	Nuevo Necaxa	42	14	14	14	54	60	−6	50	
5	Bachilleres	42	10	16	16	48	70	−22	43	

Source: RSSSF
(Q) Qualified for the phase indicated

=== Group 2 ===
Pos	Team	Pld	W	D	L	GF	GA	GD	Pts	Qualification or relegation
1	Tepic (Q)	42	18	13	11	62	46	+16	59	Qualified to Playoffs
2	Estado de México (Q)	42	19	8	15	64	46	+18	58	Qualified to Playoffs
3	Irapuato	42	15	15	12	69	57	+12	55	
4	Coyotes Neza	42	15	14	13	52	48	+4	49	
5	Salamanca	42	11	15	16	48	61	−13	41	
6	Pachuca	42	13	9	20	51	70	−19	39	

Source: RSSSF
(Q) Qualified for the phase indicated

=== Group 3 ===
Pos	Team	Pld	W	D	L	GF	GA	GD	Pts	Qualification or relegation
1	Atletas Industriales (Q)	42	17	14	11	61	41	+20	58	Qualified to Playoffs
2	Cuautla (Q)	42	11	18	13	49	54	−5	44	Qualified to Playoffs
3	Tapatío	42	10	15	17	49	61	−12	39	
4	U.V. Coatzacoalcos	42	13	9	20	43	65	−22	38	
5	Morelos (R)	42	9	11	22	47	72	−25	34	Relegated

Source: RSSSF
(Q) Qualified for the phase indicated; (R) Relegated

=== Group 4 ===
Pos	Team	Pld	W	D	L	GF	GA	GD	Pts	Qualification or relegation
1	Zamora (Q)	42	16	12	14	60	58	+2	53	Qualified to Playoffs
2	La Piedad (Q)	42	12	20	10	53	50	+3	49	Qualified to Playoffs
3	Tuberos de Veracruz	42	15	14	13	56	58	−2	49	
4	Nacional	42	14	16	12	55	57	−2	49	
5	U.V. Córdoba	42	12	18	12	55	60	−5	46	
6	Colima	42	12	16	14	52	54	−2	45	

Source: RSSSF
(Q) Qualified for the phase indicated

== Results ==
Home \ Away	ATL	ATC	ATI	ATM	BAC	COL	COY	CUA	EDM	IRA	LPD	MOR	NAC	NEC	PAC	SAL	TAP	TEP	TUB	UVCt	UVCr	ZAM
Atlas	—	2–4	0–0	2–1	1–2	3–1	2–0	1–0	1–0	2–0	1–1	4–0	4–0	6–1	3–1	4–1	1–1	2–1	2–1	4–1	4–0	3–0
Atletas Campesinos	1–0	—	0–0	3–2	4–0	4–0	1–1	0–0	0–3	4–2	0–2	2–1	2–0	0–0	2–0	3–0	1–1	0–1	4–1	2–0	2–1	0–1
Atletas Industriales	0–1	2–1	—	0–0	4–0	0–0	3–1	2–2	4–4	0–2	0–1	3–0	0–0	2–1	5–0	1–0	3–1	2–0	1–1	3–2	4–2	3–2
Atlético Morelia	2–3	4–3	1–2	—	3–0	2–1	2–1	2–0	3–0	1–1	0–1	3–1	1–0	1–1	0–1	3–1	2–2	5–1	3–0	2–0	2–3	1–1
Bachilleres	1–1	4–2	1–3	1–2	—	2–1	0–0	0–0	0–1	2–0	1–1	2–0	0–0	0–0	4–2	1–1	3–3	2–2	1–1	3–1	2–2	0–0
Colima	0–0	3–0	0–0	3–3	2–0	—	2–0	2–2	1–0	3–1	2–2	3–2	2–1	1–0	0–0	1–3	4–0	1–1	1–1	1–2	0–0	3–2
Coyotes Neza	2–0	1–1	0–0	1–1	3–0	1–0	—	1–2	1–0	3–1	1–1	3–0	1–1	2–1	3–2	1–0	1–1	2–1	2–2	1–0	4–1	1–2
Cuautla	0–0	0–0	1–0	0–1	2–0	0–0	1–0	—	1–1	2–2	4–1	1–1	4–1	1–2	0–1	3–2	1–3	3–1	1–1	0–0	2–2	2–1
Estado de México	3–0	0–1	0–1	0–2	1–0	3–1	0–0	1–1	—	3–0	3–2	2–0	3–1	0–2	1–0	2–0	4–1	3–2	2–0	4–0	1–1	3–0
Irapuato	0–0	1–0	2–0	1–0	3–3	2–0	2–2	5–2	2–2	—	0–0	3–1	5–0	2–1	6–1	1–2	3–1	1–0	1–1	3–1	2–3	1–1
La Piedad	2–1	2–2	3–3	0–0	3–0	2–1	0–1	3–3	1–1	1–0	—	0–0	0–0	1–3	2–0	2–0	0–1	1–1	0–0	3–1	1–1	2–2
Morelos	1–0	2–0	1–1	0–2	0–1	2–2	3–2	2–0	4–3	1–1	1–2	—	2–1	2–2	2–3	2–0	0–0	1–1	1–2	3–0	1–3	3–0
Nacional	1–0	2–1	1–1	0–2	6–1	1–1	2–2	3–1	1–2	3–1	3–2	1–0	—	2–2	2–1	0–0	2–2	1–1	3–1	0–0	2–1	1–1
Nuevo Necaxa	1–3	2–1	1–0	2–0	3–1	0–0	1–1	0–1	2–1	0–0	2–1	2–1	1–3	—	2–0	1–1	1–1	3–1	3–0	1–2	1–1	1–1
Pachuca	0–2	1–0	2–2	3–1	2–2	3–2	2–0	1–1	0–1	2–3	1–0	1–1	2–3	4–2	—	3–2	0–1	0–1	1–3	1–0	1–0	4–0
Salamanca	0–0	0–3	1–0	1–1	2–0	3–2	3–2	0–1	1–3	0–0	2–2	1–1	1–1	1–1	1–1	—	0–1	2–1	2–1	3–0	1–1	2–1
Tapatío	0–1	0–1	0–2	0–1	0–2	1–1	1–2	2–2	0–0	1–4	0–1	3–0	0–1	4–1	1–1	1–3	—	2–2	2–1	4–0	0–1	2–2
Tepic	0–0	1–0	1–0	2–0	2–1	2–0	2–1	3–0	1–0	0–0	2–2	3–0	1–1	4–0	3–1	2–0	0–1	—	3–0	2–2	2–2	2–0
Tuberos	1–1	2–1	2–1	0–2	4–1	1–0	0–0	0–0	2–1	3–3	1–1	2–1	0–0	4–0	1–0	3–1	2–1	1–3	—	2–1	3–1	1–0
U.V. Coatzacoalcos	2–1	1–0	2–1	0–1	0–0	0–0	0–1	3–2	2–1	2–0	3–0	3–3	2–1	0–2	1–1	2–2	0–1	0–1	1–0	—	0–0	2–0
U.V. Córdoba	3–3	3–1	1–2	1–1	1–1	1–2	1–0	1–0	2–1	1–1	1–1	1–0	2–1	1–1	4–1	0–0	3–1	1–1	2–2	1–2	—	0–0
Zamora	3–0	3–1	1–0	2–0	3–3	1–2	3–0	2–0	2–0	2–1	1–0	3–0	1–2	2–1	0–0	2–2	1–1	1–3	3–2	4–2	3–1	—

Source: RSSSF
Legend: Blue = home team win; Yellow = draw; Red = away team win.

== Final stage ==
=== Group 1 ===
Pos	Team	Pld	W	D	L	GF	GA	GD	Pts	Promotion	ATL	EDM	ATI	LPD
1	Atlas (Q)	6	3	1	2	11	5	+6	10	Qualified to Final		0–0	4–0	3–0
2	Estado de México	6	4	1	1	6	3	+3	9		2–1		1–0	1–0
3	Atletas Industriales	6	2	0	4	6	9	−3	6		2–0	1–2		2–0
4	La Piedad	6	2	0	4	4	10	−6	4		1–3	1–0	2–1	

Source: RSSSF
Rules for classification: 1st points; 2nd head-to-head points; 3rd head-to-head goal difference; 4th head-to-head goals scored; 5th goal difference; 6th number of goals scored
(Q) Qualified for the phase indicated

=== Group 2 ===
Pos	Team	Pld	W	D	L	GF	GA	GD	Pts	Promotion	CUA	TEP	ZAM	ATM
1	Cuautla (Q)	6	4	1	1	11	6	+5	11	Qualified to Final		3–1	2–0	3–2
2	Tepic	6	4	0	2	11	8	+3	10		2–1		3–1	2–1
3	Zamora	6	3	1	2	6	5	+1	8		0–0	1–0		1–0
4	Atlético Morelia	6	0	0	6	5	14	−9	0		1–2	1–3	0–3	

Source: RSSSF
Rules for classification: 1st points; 2nd head-to-head points; 3rd head-to-head goal difference; 4th head-to-head goals scored; 5th goal difference; 6th number of goals scored
(Q) Qualified for the phase indicated

=== Final ===
June 17, 1979

Cuautla	1–2	Atlas
	Report

Estadio Isidro Gil Tapia, Cuautla

June 22, 1979

Atlas	1–1	Cuautla
Arturo Magaña 37'	Report	Juan Ugalde 52'

Estadio Jalisco, Guadalajara
