= List of players who have appeared in four or more FIFA Women's World Cups =

In the FIFA Women's World Cup, the following female players have been named in the national team in at least four finals tournaments.

== Tournaments ==
Team	Player (Note: Name in bold indicates a player still active at club level.)	In squad (Note: Number of finals tournaments in which the player was part of the squad.)	Played (Note: Number of finals tournaments in which the player played in at least one match.)	Tournaments (Note: Tournaments in round brackets: e.g., (1991): Part of the tournament squad, but did not play)
Brazil	Formiga	7	7	1995, 1999, 2003, 2007, 2011, 2015, 2019
Japan	Homare Sawa	6	6	1995, 1999, 2003, 2007, 2011, 2015
Brazil	**Marta**	6	6	2003, 2007, 2011, 2015, 2019, 2023
Canada	**Christine Sinclair**	6	6	2003, 2007, 2011, 2015, 2019, 2023
Nigeria	**Onome Ebi**	6	6	2003, 2007, 2011, 2015, 2019, 2023
United States	Kristine Lilly	5	5	1991, 1995, 1999, 2003, 2007
Germany	Birgit Prinz	5	5	1995, 1999, 2003, 2007, 2011
United States	Christie Rampone	5	5	1999, 2003, 2007, 2011, 2015
Brazil	**Cristiane**	5	5	2003, 2007, 2011, 2015, 2019
Canada	**Sophie Schmidt**	5	5	2007, 2011, 2015, 2019, 2023
New Zealand	**Annalie Longo**	5	5	2007, 2011, 2015, 2019, 2023
New Zealand	**Ria Percival**	5	5	2007, 2011, 2015, 2019, 2023
New Zealand	**Ali Riley**	5	5	2007, 2011, 2015, 2019, 2023
Sweden	**Caroline Seger**	5	5	2007, 2011, 2015, 2019, 2023
Norway	Bente Nordby	5	4	(1991), 1995, 1999, 2003, 2007
Australia	**Clare Polkinghorne**	5	4	2007, 2011, (2015), 2019, 2023
Australia	**Lydia Williams**	5	3	(2007), 2011, 2015, 2019, (2023)
Germany	Nadine Angerer	5	3	(1999), (2003), 2007, 2011, 2015
Canada	Karina LeBlanc	5	2	(1999), 2003, (2007), 2011, (2015)
Brazil	**Bárbara**	5	1	(2007), (2011), (2015), 2019, (2023)
China	Sun Wen	4	4	1991, 1995, 1999, 2003
Germany	Bettina Wiegmann	4	4	1991, 1995, 1999, 2003
Nigeria	Florence Omagbemi	4	4	1991, 1995, 1999, 2003
Nigeria	Nkiru Okosieme	4	4	1991, 1995, 1999, 2003
Norway	Hege Riise	4	4	1991, 1995, 1999, 2003
United States	Joy Fawcett	4	4	1991, 1995, 1999, 2003
United States	Julie Foudy	4	4	1991, 1995, 1999, 2003
United States	Mia Hamm	4	4	1991, 1995, 1999, 2003
Brazil	Pretinha	4	4	1991, 1995, 1999, 2007
Australia	Cheryl Salisbury	4	4	1995, 1999, 2003, 2007
Brazil	Tânia	4	4	1995, 1999, 2003, 2007
Canada	Andrea Neil	4	4	1995, 1999, 2003, 2007
Germany	Sandra Minnert	4	4	1995, 1999, 2003, 2007
Germany	Sandra Smisek	4	4	1995, 1999, 2003, 2007
United States	Briana Scurry	4	4	1995, 1999, 2003, 2007
Germany	Ariane Hingst	4	4	1999, 2003, 2007, 2011
Nigeria	Stella Mbachu	4	4	1999, 2003, 2007, 2011
Norway	Solveig Gulbrandsen	4	4	1999, 2003, 2007, 2015
Japan	Kozue Ando	4	4	1999, 2007, 2011, 2015
Australia	**Melissa Barbieri**	4	4	2003, 2007, 2011, 2015
Brazil	Rosana	4	4	2003, 2007, 2011, 2015
Canada	Diana Matheson	4	4	2003, 2007, 2011, 2015
Canada	Rhian Wilkinson	4	4	2003, 2007, 2011, 2015
Japan	Aya Miyama	4	4	2003, 2007, 2011, 2015
Nigeria	Precious Dede	4	4	2003, 2007, 2011, 2015
Nigeria	Perpetua Nkwocha	4	4	2003, 2007, 2011, 2015
Norway	Trine Rønning	4	4	2003, 2007, 2011, 2015
Sweden	Therese Sjögran	4	4	2003, 2007, 2011, 2015
United States	Shannon Boxx	4	4	2003, 2007, 2011, 2015
United States	Abby Wambach	4	4	2003, 2007, 2011, 2015
Australia	Lisa De Vanna	4	4	2007, 2011, 2015, 2019
England	Karen Carney	4	4	2007, 2011, 2015, 2019
England	Jill Scott	4	4	2007, 2011, 2015, 2019
New Zealand	Katie Duncan	4	4	2007, 2011, 2015, 2019
New Zealand	Abby Erceg	4	4	2007, 2011, 2015, 2019
Norway	Isabell Herlovsen	4	4	2007, 2011, 2015, 2019
Sweden	Nilla Fischer	4	4	2007, 2011, 2015, 2019
Sweden	**Hedvig Lindahl**	4	4	2007, 2011, 2015, 2019
United States	Carli Lloyd	4	4	2007, 2011, 2015, 2019
Australia	**Caitlin Foord**	4	4	2011, 2015, 2019, 2023
Australia	**Emily van Egmond**	4	4	2011, 2015, 2019, 2023
Australia	**Sam Kerr**	4	4	2011, 2015, 2019, 2023
Australia	**Tameka Yallop**	4	4	2011, 2015, 2019, 2023
Brazil	**Beatriz**	4	4	2011, 2015, 2019, 2023
France	**Eugénie Le Sommer**	4	4	2011, 2015, 2019, 2023
France	**Wendie Renard**	4	4	2011, 2015, 2019, 2023
Germany	**Alexandra Popp**	4	4	2011, 2015, 2019, 2023
Japan	**Saki Kumagai**	4	4	2011, 2015, 2019, 2023
New Zealand	**Katie Bowen**	4	4	2011, 2015, 2019, 2023
New Zealand	**Betsy Hassett**	4	4	2011, 2015, 2019, 2023
New Zealand	**Hannah Wilkinson**	4	4	2011, 2015, 2019, 2023
Nigeria	**Osinachi Ohale**	4	4	2011, 2015, 2019, 2023
Nigeria	**Desire Oparanozie**	4	4	2011, 2015, 2019, 2023
Nigeria	**Francisca Ordega**	4	4	2011, 2015, 2019, 2023
Norway	**Emilie Haavi**	4	4	2011, 2015, 2019, 2023
Norway	**Maren Mjelde**	4	4	2011, 2015, 2019, 2023
Sweden	**Sofia Jakobsson**	4	4	2011, 2015, 2019, 2023
Sweden	**Linda Sembrant**	4	4	2011, 2015, 2019, 2023
United States	Alex Morgan	4	4	2011, 2015, 2019, 2023
United States	**Kelley O'Hara**	4	4	2011, 2015, 2019, 2023
United States	Megan Rapinoe	4	4	2011, 2015, 2019, 2023
Brazil	Kátia	4	3	(1995), 1999, 2003, 2007
Nigeria	Maureen Mmadu	4	3	1995, (1999), 2003, 2007
Brazil	Andréia	4	3	(1999), 2003, 2007, 2011
Canada	Erin McLeod	4	3	(2003), 2007, 2011, 2015
Nigeria	**Faith Michael**	4	3	(2003), 2007, 2011, 2019
Japan	Rumi Utsugi	4	3	2007, 2011, 2015, (2019)
Argentina	**Vanina Correa**	4	3	(2003), 2007, 2019, 2023
Japan	Nozomi Yamago	4	2	1999, 2003, (2007), (2011)
Japan	Mizuho Sakaguchi	4	2	(2007), 2011, 2015, (2019)
New Zealand	**Erin Nayler**	4	2	(2011), 2015, 2019, (2023)
Nigeria	**Tochukwu Oluehi**	4	1	(2007), (2011), 2019, (2023)

== Matches ==
The following players earned caps in at least 18 matches, which requires appearances at a minimum of three World Cup tournaments.

Team	Player (Note: Name in bold indicates a player still active in international football.)	Matches (Note: Number of finals matches the player entered the field, not counting those as an unused substitute.)	Tournaments
United States	Kristine Lilly	30	1991, 1995, 1999, 2003, 2007
Brazil	Formiga	27	1995, 1999, 2003, 2007, 2011, 2015, 2019
United States	Abby Wambach	25	2003, 2007, 2011, 2015
United States	Carli Lloyd	25	2007, 2011, 2015, 2019
United States	Julie Foudy	24	1991, 1995, 1999, 2003
Japan	Homare Sawa	24	1995, 1999, 2003, 2007, 2011, 2015
Germany	Birgit Prinz	24	1995, 1999, 2003, 2007, 2011
Canada	**Christine Sinclair**	24	2003, 2007, 2011, 2015, 2019, 2023
United States	Joy Fawcett	23	1991, 1995, 1999, 2003
United States	Mia Hamm	23	1991, 1995, 1999, 2003
Brazil	**Marta**	23	2003, 2007, 2011, 2015, 2019, 2023
Norway	Bente Nordby	22	1991, 1995, 1999, 2003, 2007
Norway	Hege Riise	22	1991, 1995, 1999, 2003
Germany	Bettina Wiegmann	22	1991, 1995, 1999, 2003
United States	**Alex Morgan**	22	2011, 2015, 2019, 2023
Brazil	**Cristiane**	21	2003, 2007, 2011, 2015, 2019
England	Jill Scott	21	2007, 2011, 2015, 2019
Japan	**Saki Kumagai**	21	2011, 2015, 2019, 2023
China	Sun Wen	20	1991, 1995, 1999, 2003
Sweden	**Hedvig Lindahl**	20	2007, 2011, 2015, 2019
Sweden	**Caroline Seger**	20	2007, 2011, 2015, 2019, 2023
France	**Eugénie Le Sommer**	20	2011, 2015, 2019, 2023
United States	**Megan Rapinoe**	20	2011, 2015, 2019, 2023
England	**Lucy Bronze**	20	2015, 2019, 2023
United States	Briana Scurry	19	1995, 1999, 2003, 2007
United States	Christie Rampone	19	1999, 2003, 2007, 2011, 2015
Norway	Solveig Gulbrandsen	19	1999, 2003, 2007, 2015
Australia	**Caitlin Foord**	19	2011, 2015, 2019, 2023
Australia	**Emily van Egmond**	19	2011, 2015, 2019, 2023
United States	Carla Overbeck	18	1991, 1995, 1999
United States	Tiffeny Milbrett	18	1995, 1999, 2003
Sweden	Therese Sjögran	18	2003, 2007, 2011, 2015
Canada	**Sophie Schmidt**	18	2007, 2011, 2015, 2019, 2023
Germany	**Alexandra Popp**	18	2011, 2015, 2019, 2023

== See also ==
- List of players who have appeared in the most FIFA World Cups
