= List of players who have appeared in the most FIFA World Cups =

List of players who have appeared in at least four FIFA World Cups

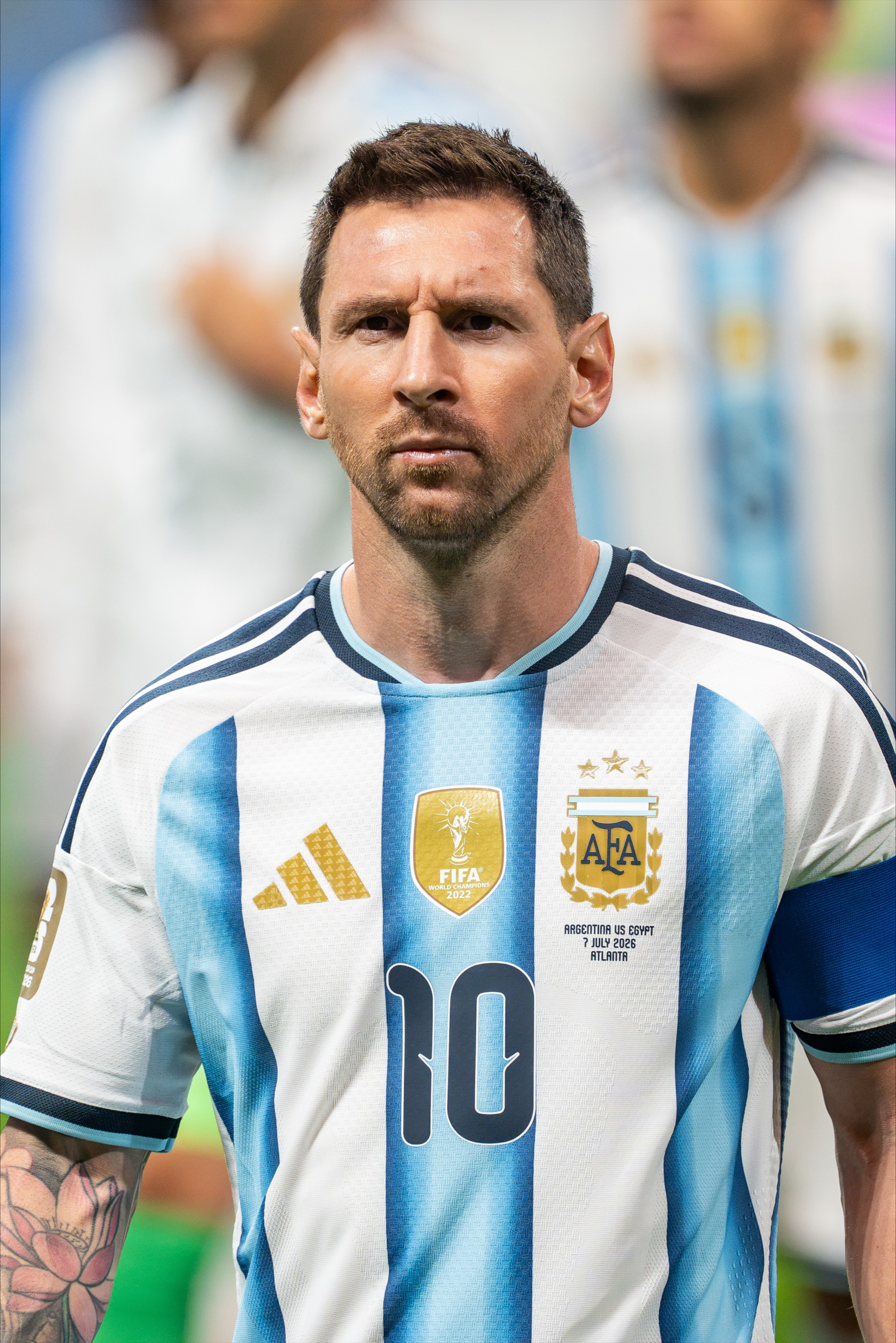
Lionel Messi holds the record for most matches played at the FIFA World Cup.

In the FIFA World Cup, the following male football players have made the most final tournament appearances in matches and inclusions as squad members.

== Matches ==
The following players had caps in at least 15 FIFA World Cup tournament matches.

Rank	Team	Player (Note: Name in bold indicates a player still active in international football.)	Matches (Note: Number of finals matches the player entered the field, not counting those as an unused substitute.)	Tournaments (Note: Year in bold indicates the player won the tournament that year.)
1	Argentina	Lionel Messi	34	2006, 2010, 2014, 2018, **2022**, 2026
2	Portugal	Cristiano Ronaldo	27	2006, 2010, 2014, 2018, 2022, 2026
3	Germany	Lothar Matthäus	25	1982, 1986, **1990**, 1994, 1998
4	Germany	Miroslav Klose	24	2002, 2006, 2010, **2014**
5	Italy	Paolo Maldini	23	1990, 1994, 1998, 2002
5	Croatia	**Luka Modrić**	23	2006, 2014, 2018, 2022, 2026
5	Germany	Manuel Neuer	23	2010, **2014**, 2018, 2022, 2026
8	France	**Kylian Mbappé**	22	**2018**, 2022, 2026
9	Belgium	**Thibaut Courtois**	21	2014, 2018, 2022, 2026
9	Argentina	Diego Maradona	21	1982, **1986**, 1990, 1994
9	Argentina	Nicolás Otamendi	21	2010, 2018, **2022**, 2026
9	Croatia	**Ivan Perišić**	21	2014, 2018, 2022, 2026
9	West Germany	Uwe Seeler	21	1958, 1962, 1966, 1970
9	Poland	Władysław Żmuda	21	1974, 1978, 1982, 1986
15	Brazil	Cafu	20	**1994**, 1998, **2002**, 2006
15	Germany	Philipp Lahm	20	2006, 2010, **2014**
15	Poland	Grzegorz Lato	20	1974, 1978, 1982
15	France	Hugo Lloris	20	2010, 2014, **2018**, 2022
15	Argentina	Javier Mascherano	20	2006, 2010, 2014, 2018
15	Germany	Bastian Schweinsteiger	20	2006, 2010, **2014**
21	France	**Ousmane Dembélé**	19	**2018**, 2022, 2026
21	France	Antoine Griezmann	19	2014, **2018**, 2022
21	Croatia	**Mateo Kovačić**	19	2014, 2018, 2022, 2026
21	Mexico	Rafael Márquez	19	2002, 2006, 2010, 2014, 2018
21	Germany	Per Mertesacker	19	2006, 2010, **2014**
21	Germany	Thomas Müller	19	2010, **2014**, 2018, 2022
21	Uruguay	Fernando Muslera	19	2010, 2014, 2018, 2026
21	West Germany	Wolfgang Overath	19	1966, 1970, **1974**
21	England	**Jordan Pickford**	19	2018, 2022, 2026
21	Brazil	Ronaldo	19	**1994**, 1998, **2002**, 2006
21	West Germany	Karl-Heinz Rummenigge	19	1978, 1982, 1986
21	West Germany	Berti Vogts	19	1970, **1974**, 1978
33	West Germany	Franz Beckenbauer	18	1966, 1970, **1974**
33	Germany	Thomas Berthold	18	1986, **1990**, 1994
33	Italy	Antonio Cabrini	18	1978, **1982**, 1986
33	Italy	Fabio Cannavaro	18	1998, 2002, **2006**, 2010
33	Belgium	**Kevin De Bruyne**	18	2014, 2018, 2022, 2026
33	Argentina	Ángel Di María	18	2010, 2014, 2018, **2022**
33	Brazil	Dunga	18	1990, **1994**, 1998
33	France	Olivier Giroud	18	2014, **2018**, 2022
33	England	**Harry Kane**	18	2018, 2022, 2026
33	Argentina	Mario Kempes	18	1974, **1978**, 1982
33	West Germany	Pierre Littbarski	18	1982, 1986, **1990**
33	Belgium	Romelu Lukaku	18	2014, 2018, 2022, 2026
33	West Germany	Sepp Maier	18	1970, **1974**, 1978
33	Switzerland	**Ricardo Rodriguez**	18	2014, 2018, 2022, 2026
33	Italy	Gaetano Scirea	18	1978, **1982**, 1986
33	Brazil	Cláudio Taffarel	18	1990, **1994**, 1998
33	France	Raphaël Varane	18	2014, **2018**, 2022
33	Switzerland	**Granit Xhaka**	18	2014, 2018, 2022, 2026
51	France	Fabien Barthez	17	**1998**, 2002, 2006
51	Spain	Sergio Busquets	17	**2010**, 2014, 2018, 2022
51	Brazil	Roberto Carlos	17	1998, **2002**, 2006
51	Spain	Iker Casillas	17	2002, 2006, **2010**, 2014
51	Uruguay	Edinson Cavani	17	2010, 2014, 2018, 2022
51	France	Thierry Henry	17	**1998**, 2002, 2006, 2010
51	Germany	Jürgen Klinsmann	17	**1990**, 1994, 1998
51	Croatia	**Andrej Kramarić**	17	2018, 2022, 2026
51	Brazil	Lúcio	17	**2002**, 2006, 2010
51	Spain	Sergio Ramos	17	2006, **2010**, 2014, 2018
51	England	**Marcus Rashford**	17	2018, 2022, 2026
51	West Germany	Karl-Heinz Schnellinger	17	1958, 1962, 1966, 1970
51	Belgium	Enzo Scifo	17	1986, 1990, 1994, 1998
51	England	Peter Shilton	17	1982, 1986, 1990
51	Netherlands	Wesley Sneijder	17	2006, 2010, 2014
51	England	**John Stones**	17	2018, 2022, 2026
51	Argentina	**Nicolás Tagliafico**	17	2018, **2022**, 2026
51	Netherlands	Robin van Persie	17	2006, 2010, 2014
51	Italy	Dino Zoff	17	1974, 1978, **1982**
70	Italy	Roberto Baggio	16	1990, 1994, 1998
70	Italy	Giuseppe Bergomi	16	**1982**, 1986, 1990, 1998
70	Poland	Zbigniew Boniek	16	1978, 1982, 1986
70	Germany	Andreas Brehme	16	1986, **1990**, 1994
70	Belgium	Jan Ceulemans	16	1982, 1986, 1990
70	Uruguay	Diego Godín	16	2010, 2014, 2018, 2022
70	Morocco	**Achraf Hakimi**	16	2018, 2022, 2026
70	South Korea	Hong Myung-bo	16	1990, 1994, 1998, 2002
70	Brazil	Jairzinho	16	1966, **1970**, 1974
70	Croatia	Dejan Lovren	16	2014, 2018, 2022
70	Japan	**Yūto Nagatomo**	16	2010, 2014, 2018, 2022, 2026
70	Germany	Mesut Özil	16	2010, **2014**, 2018
70	Argentina	Oscar Ruggeri	16	**1986**, 1990, 1994
70	Brazil	Gilberto Silva	16	**2002**, 2006, 2010
70	Uruguay	Luis Suárez	16	2010, 2014, 2018, 2022
70	France	Lilian Thuram	16	**1998**, 2002, 2006
70	Spain	Andoni Zubizarreta	16	1986, 1990, 1994, 1998
87	Argentina	**Julián Alvarez**	15	**2022**, 2026
87	Brazil	Bebeto	15	1990, **1994**, 1998
87	France	Maxime Bossis	15	1978, 1982, 1986
87	Brazil	Didi	15	1954, **1958**, **1962**
87	Netherlands	Dirk Kuyt	15	2006, 2010, 2014
87	Argentina	**Emiliano Martínez**	15	**2022**, 2026
87	Brazil	Neymar	15	2014, 2018, 2022, 2026
87	Brazil	Nílton Santos	15	1954, **1958**, **1962**
87	Germany	Lukas Podolski	15	2006, 2010, **2014**
87	Brazil	Rivellino	15	**1970**, 1974, 1978
87	Netherlands	Arjen Robben	15	2006, 2010, 2014
87	West Germany	Hans Schäfer	15	**1954**, 1958, 1962
87	Brazil	Thiago Silva	15	2014, 2018, 2022
87	Germany	Rudi Völler	15	1986, **1990**, 1994
87	Belgium	Axel Witsel	15	2014, 2018, 2022, 2026
87	Spain	Xavi	15	2002, 2006, **2010**, 2014

== Tournaments ==
The following players have been included in their national squads for multiple World Cup final tournaments. Players with four or more squad inclusions are listed here.

Team	Player (Note: Name in bold indicates a player still active at international level.)	In squad (Note: Number of finals tournaments in which the player was part of the squad.)	Played (Note: Number of finals tournaments in which the player played in at least one match.)	Tournaments (Note: Years in brackets indicate that the player was part of the squad but did not play in any matches.)	References
Argentina	Lionel Messi	6	6	2006, 2010, 2014, 2018, 2022, 2026	(Note: Lionel Messi – FIFA competition record (archived))
Portugal	Cristiano Ronaldo	6	6	2006, 2010, 2014, 2018, 2022, 2026	(Note: Cristiano Ronaldo – FIFA competition record (archived))
Mexico	Guillermo Ochoa	6	4	(2006), (2010), 2014, 2018, 2022, 2026	(Note: Guillermo Ochoa – FIFA competition record (archived))
Mexico	Antonio Carbajal	5	5	1950, 1954, 1958, 1962, 1966	(Note: Antonio Carbajal – FIFA competition record (archived))
Mexico	Andrés Guardado	5	5	2006, 2010, 2014, 2018, 2022	(Note: Andrés Guardado – FIFA competition record (archived))
Mexico	Rafael Márquez	5	5	2002, 2006, 2010, 2014, 2018	(Note: Rafael Márquez – FIFA competition record (archived))
Germany	Lothar Matthäus	5	5	1982, 1986, 1990, 1994, 1998	(Note: Lothar Matthäus – FIFA competition record (archived))
Croatia	**Luka Modrić**	5	5	2006, 2014, 2018, 2022, 2026	
Japan	**Yūto Nagatomo**	5	5	2010, 2014, 2018, 2022, 2026	(Note: Yuto Nagatomo – FIFA competition record (archived))
Germany	Manuel Neuer	5	5	2010, 2014, 2018, 2022, 2026	(Note: Manuel Neuer – FIFA competition record (archived))
Italy	Gianluigi Buffon	5	4	(1998), 2002, 2006, 2010, 2014	(Note: Gianluigi Buffon – FIFA competition record (archived))
Uruguay	Fernando Muslera	5	4	2010, 2014, 2018, (2022), 2026	(Note: Fernando Muslera – FIFA competition record (archived))
Saudi Arabia	Sami Al-Jaber	4	4	1994, 1998, 2002, 2006	(Note: Sami Al-Jaber – FIFA competition record (archived))
United States	DaMarcus Beasley	4	4	2002, 2006, 2010, 2014	(Note: DaMarcus Beasley – FIFA competition record (archived))
Switzerland	Valon Behrami	4	4	2006, 2010, 2014, 2018	(Note: Valon Behrami – FIFA competition record (archived))
Italy	Giuseppe Bergomi	4	4	1982, 1986, 1990, 1998	(Note: Giuseppe Bergomi – FIFA competition record (archived))
Spain	Sergio Busquets	4	4	2010, 2014, 2018, 2022	(Note: Sergio Busquets – FIFA competition record (archived))
Uruguay	Martín Cáceres	4	4	2010, 2014, 2018, 2022	(Note: Martín Cáceres – FIFA competition record (archived))
Brazil	Cafu	4	4	1994, 1998, 2002, 2006	(Note: Cafu – FIFA competition record (archived))
Australia	Tim Cahill	4	4	2006, 2010, 2014, 2018	(Note: Tim Cahill – FIFA competition record (archived))
Paraguay	Denis Caniza	4	4	1998, 2002, 2006, 2010	(Note: Denis Caniza – FIFA competition record (archived))
Italy	Fabio Cannavaro	4	4	1998, 2002, 2006, 2010	(Note: Fabio Cannavaro – FIFA competition record (archived))
Spain	Iker Casillas	4	4	2002, 2006, 2010, 2014	(Note: Iker Casillas – FIFA competition record (archived))
Uruguay	Edinson Cavani	4	4	2010, 2014, 2018, 2022	(Note: Edinson Cavani – FIFA competition record (archived))
Belgium	**Thibaut Courtois**	4	4	2014, 2018, 2022, 2026	
Belgium	**Kevin De Bruyne**	4	4	2014, 2018, 2022, 2026	
Argentina	Ángel Di María	4	4	2010, 2014, 2018, 2022	(Note: Ángel Di María – FIFA competition record (archived))
Cameroon	Samuel Eto'o	4	4	1998, 2002, 2010, 2014	(Note: Samuel Eto'o – FIFA competition record (archived))
Uruguay	Diego Godín	4	4	2010, 2014, 2018, 2022	(Note: Diego Godín – FIFA competition record (archived))
Iran	Ehsan Hajsafi	4	4	2014, 2018, 2022, 2026	
England	**Jordan Henderson**	4	4	2014, 2018, 2022, 2026	
France	Thierry Henry	4	4	1998, 2002, 2006, 2010	(Note: Thierry Henry – FIFA competition record (archived))
South Korea	Hong Myung-bo	4	4	1990, 1994, 1998, 2002	(Note: Hong Myung-Bo – FIFA competition record (archived))
Spain	Andrés Iniesta	4	4	2006, 2010, 2014, 2018	(Note: Andrés Iniesta – FIFA competition record (archived))
Iran	**Alireza Jahanbakhsh**	4	4	2014, 2018, 2022, 2026	
Mexico	**Raúl Jiménez**	4	4	2014, 2018, 2022, 2026	
Germany	Miroslav Klose	4	4	2002, 2006, 2010, 2014	(Note: Miroslav Klose – FIFA competition record (archived))
Croatia	**Mateo Kovačić**	4	4	2014, 2018, 2022, 2026	
Australia	**Mathew Leckie**	4	4	2014, 2018, 2022, 2026	
France	Hugo Lloris	4	4	2010, 2014, 2018, 2022	(Note: Hugo Lloris – FIFA competition record (archived))
Belgium	Romelu Lukaku	4	4	2014, 2018, 2022, 2026	
Italy	Paolo Maldini	4	4	1990, 1994, 1998, 2002	(Note: Paolo Maldini – FIFA competition record (archived))
Argentina	Diego Maradona	4	4	1982, 1986, 1990, 1994	(Note: Diego Maradona – FIFA competition record (archived))
Argentina	Javier Mascherano	4	4	2006, 2010, 2014, 2018	(Note: Javier Mascherano – FIFA competition record (archived))
Mexico	Héctor Moreno	4	4	2010, 2014, 2018, 2022	(Note: Héctor Moreno – FIFA competition record (archived))
Germany	Thomas Müller	4	4	2010, 2014, 2018, 2022	(Note: Thomas Müller – FIFA competition record (archived))
Brazil	Neymar	4	4	2014, 2018, 2022, 2026	
Argentina	Nicolás Otamendi	4	4	2010, 2018, 2022, 2026	
Brazil	Pelé	4	4	1958, 1962, 1966, 1970	(Note: Pelé – FIFA competition record (archived))
Portugal	Pepe	4	4	2010, 2014, 2018, 2022	(Note: Pepe – FIFA competition record (archived))
Croatia	**Ivan Perišić**	4	4	2014, 2018, 2022, 2026	
Spain	Sergio Ramos	4	4	2006, 2010, 2014, 2018	(Note: Sergio Ramos – FIFA competition record (archived))
Italy	Gianni Rivera	4	4	1962, 1966, 1970, 1974	(Note: Gianni Rivera – FIFA competition record (archived))
Uruguay	Pedro Rocha	4	4	1962, 1966, 1970, 1974	(Note: Pedro Rocha – FIFA competition record (archived))
Switzerland	**Ricardo Rodriguez**	4	4	2014, 2018, 2022, 2026	
Australia	**Mathew Ryan**	4	4	2014, 2018, 2022, 2026	
Brazil	Djalma Santos	4	4	1954, 1958, 1962, 1966	(Note: Djalma Santos – FIFA competition record (archived))
West Germany	Karl-Heinz Schnellinger	4	4	1958, 1962, 1966, 1970	(Note: Karl-Heinz Schnellinger – FIFA competition record (archived))
Belgium	Enzo Scifo	4	4	1986, 1990, 1994, 1998	(Note: Enzo Scifo – FIFA competition record (archived))
West Germany	Uwe Seeler	4	4	1958, 1962, 1966, 1970	(Note: Uwe Seeler – FIFA competition record (archived))
Switzerland	Xherdan Shaqiri	4	4	2010, 2014, 2018, 2022	(Note: Xherdan Shaqiri – FIFA competition record (archived))
South Korea	**Son Heung-min**	4	4	2014, 2018, 2022, 2026	
Cameroon	Rigobert Song	4	4	1994, 1998, 2002, 2010	(Note: Rigobert Song – FIFA competition record (archived))
Uruguay	Luis Suárez	4	4	2010, 2014, 2018, 2022	(Note: Luis Suárez – FIFA competition record (archived))
Belgium	Franky Van der Elst	4	4	1986, 1990, 1994, 1998	(Note: Franky Van der Elst – FIFA competition record (archived))
Belgium	Axel Witsel	4	4	2014, 2018, 2022, 2026	
Spain	Xavi	4	4	2002, 2006, 2010, 2014	(Note: Xavi – FIFA competition record (archived))
Switzerland	**Granit Xhaka**	4	4	2014, 2018, 2022, 2026	
Poland	Władysław Żmuda	4	4	1974, 1978, 1982, 1986	(Note: Władysław Żmuda – FIFA competition record (archived))
Spain	Andoni Zubizarreta	4	4	1986, 1990, 1994, 1998	(Note: Andoni Zubizarreta – FIFA competition record (archived))
Saudi Arabia	Mohamed Al-Deayea	4	3	1994, 1998, 2002, (2006)	(Note: Mohamed Al-Deayea – FIFA competition record (archived))
England	Bobby Charlton	4	3	(1958), 1962, 1966, 1970	(Note: Bobby Charlton – FIFA competition record (archived))
Uruguay	**José Giménez**	4	3	2014, 2018, 2022, (2026)	
Spain	Fernando Hierro	4	3	(1990), 1994, 1998, 2002	(Note: Fernando Hierro – FIFA competition record (archived))
South Korea	Hwang Sun-hong	4	3	1990, 1994, (1998), 2002	(Note: Hwang Sun-Hong – FIFA competition record (archived))
Japan	Eiji Kawashima	4	3	2010, 2014, 2018, (2022)	(Note: Eiji Kawashima – FIFA competition record (archived))
South Korea	**Kim Seung-gyu**	4	3	2014, (2018), 2022, 2026	
South Korea	Lee Woon-jae	4	3	1994, 2002, 2006, (2010)	(Note: Lee Woon-jae – FIFA competition record (archived))
Scotland	Jim Leighton	4	3	(1982), 1986, 1990, 1998	(Note: Jim Leighton – FIFA competition record (archived))
West Germany	Sepp Maier	4	3	(1966), 1970, 1974, 1978	(Note: Sepp Maier – FIFA competition record (archived))
United States	Claudio Reyna	4	3	(1994), 1998, 2002, 2006	(Note: Claudio Reyna – FIFA competition record (archived))
Brazil	Ronaldo	4	3	(1994), 1998, 2002, 2006	(Note: Ronaldo – FIFA competition record (archived))
Brazil	Nílton Santos	4	3	(1950), 1954, 1958, 1962	(Note: Nílton Santos – FIFA competition record (archived))
Brazil	Thiago Silva	4	3	(2010), 2014, 2018, 2022	(Note: Thiago Silva – FIFA competition record (archived))
Belgium	Marc Wilmots	4	3	(1990), 1994, 1998, 2002	(Note: Marc Wilmots – FIFA competition record (archived))
Soviet Union	Lev Yashin	4	3	1958, 1962, 1966, (1970)	(Note: Lev Yashin – FIFA competition record (archived))
Bulgaria	Dobromir Zhechev	4	3	1962, 1966, 1970, (1974)	(Note: Dobromir Zhechev – FIFA competition record (archived))
Italy	Dino Zoff	4	3	(1970), 1974, 1978, 1982	(Note: Dino Zoff – FIFA competition record (archived))
Italy	Enrico Albertosi	4	2	(1962), 1966, 1970, (1974)	(Note: Enrico Albertosi – FIFA competition record (archived))
Germany	Oliver Kahn	4	2	(1994), (1998), 2002, 2006	(Note: Oliver Kahn – FIFA competition record (archived))
Japan	Yoshikatsu Kawaguchi	4	2	1998, (2002), 2006, (2010)	(Note: Yoshikatsu Kawaguchi – FIFA competition record (archived))
United States	Kasey Keller	4	2	(1990), 1998, (2002), 2006	(Note: Kasey Keller – FIFA competition record (archived))
Brazil	Émerson Leão	4	2	(1970), 1974, 1978, (1986)	(Note: Leão – FIFA competition record (archived))
Australia	Mark Milligan	4	2	(2006), (2010), 2014, 2018	(Note: Mark Milligan – FIFA competition record (archived))
Cameroon	Jacques Songo'o	4	2	(1990), 1994, 1998, (2002)	(Note: Jacques Songo'o – FIFA competition record (archived))
Brazil	Carlos Castilho	4	1	(1950), 1954, (1958), (1962)	(Note: Castilho – FIFA competition record (archived))
Japan	Seigo Narazaki	4	1	(1998), 2002, (2006), (2010)	(Note: Seigo Narazaki – FIFA competition record (archived))
Spain	Pepe Reina	4	1	(2006), (2010), 2014, (2018)	(Note: Pepe Reina – FIFA competition record (archived))

== See also ==
- List of players who have appeared in four or more FIFA Women's World Cups
- List of FIFA World Cup top goalscorers
- FIFA World Cup records and statistics
