= 1953–54 Mexican Segunda División season =

Segunda División de México
- Season: 1953–54
- Champions: Irapuato (1st Title)
- Matches played: 132
- Goals scored: 434 (3.29 per match)

The 1953–54 Mexican Segunda División was the fourth season of the Mexican Segunda División. The season started on 9 August 1953 and concluded on 24 January 1954. It was won by Irapuato.

Initially, 13 teams took part in the competition. However, on 11 October 1953, after a match against San Sebastián, the bus that transported the squad of Veracruz suffered an accident and some of the players died. After this incident, Veracruz was dissolved and all the matches played by the club were annulled.

== Teams ==
1953-54 Season Teams

| Club | City | Stadium |
|---|---|---|
| Anáhuac | Monterrey | Estadio Tecnológico |
| Cuautla | Cuautla | El Almeal |
| Estrella Roja | Toluca | Campo Patria |
| Irapuato | Irapuato | Estadio Revolución |
| La Piedad | La Piedad | Estadio Juan N. López |
| Moctezuma | Orizaba | Estadio Moctezuma |
| Monterrey | Monterrey | Estadio Tecnológico |
| Morelia | Morelia | Campo Morelia |
| Oviedo | Pachuca | Campo Margarito Ramírez |
| Querétaro | Querétaro | Estadio Municipal |
| San Sebastián | León | Estadio La Martinica |
| Zamora | Zamora | Parque Juan Carreño |

== League table ==
| Pos | Team | Pld | W | D | L | GF | GA | GAv | Pts | Promotion or relegation |
|---|---|---|---|---|---|---|---|---|---|---|
| 1 | Irapuato (C) | 22 | 14 | 4 | 4 | 42 | 24 | 1.750 | 32 | Promotion to Primera División |
| 2 | San Sebastián | 23 | 13 | 5 | 5 | 44 | 26 | 1.692 | 31 | |
| 3 | La Piedad | 22 | 13 | 4 | 5 | 48 | 30 | 1.600 | 30 | |
| 4 | Anáhuac | 22 | 9 | 5 | 8 | 42 | 35 | 1.200 | 23 | |
| 5 | Cuautla | 22 | 8 | 7 | 7 | 34 | 35 | 0.971 | 23 | |
| 6 | Zamora | 22 | 10 | 2 | 10 | 38 | 34 | 1.118 | 22 | |
| 7 | Querétaro | 22 | 9 | 3 | 10 | 25 | 25 | 1.000 | 21 | |
| 8 | Moctezuma | 22 | 7 | 7 | 8 | 36 | 38 | 0.947 | 21 | |
| 9 | Morelia | 22 | 8 | 2 | 12 | 35 | 40 | 0.875 | 18 | |
| 10 | Estrella Roja | 22 | 4 | 8 | 10 | 31 | 47 | 0.660 | 16 | |
| 11 | Oviedo | 22 | 5 | 5 | 12 | 36 | 56 | 0.643 | 15 | |
| 12 | Monterrey | 22 | 5 | 2 | 15 | 23 | 44 | 0.523 | 12 | |

Source: RSSSF
(C) Champions

== Results ==
| Home \ Away | ANA | CUA | EST | IRA | PIE | MOC | MTY | MOR | OVI | QRO | SAN | ZAM |
|---|---|---|---|---|---|---|---|---|---|---|---|---|
| Anáhuac | — | 3–2 | 3–4 | 2–2 | 1–0 | 4–0 | 3–0 | 1–4 | 2–2 | 0–0 | 0–1 | 1–2 |
| Cuautla | 2–0 | — | 1–1 | 1–0 | 1–1 | 0–2 | 3–0 | 1–1 | 1–1 | 0–0 | 1–0 | 3–0 |
| Estrella Roja | 1–1 | 2–4 | — | 1–3 | 2–0 | 2–2 | 1–1 | 2–2 | 1–4 | 2–1 | 1–2 | 1–1 |
| Irapuato | 2–2 | 1–0 | 4–0 | — | 3–2 | 0–0 | 3–2 | 3–1 | 4–1 | 1–0 | 2–0 | 3–1 |
| La Piedad | 1–0 | 5–3 | 1–0 | 1–1 | — | 3–2 | 3–0 | 1–0^{[1]} | 5–1 | 2–0 | 2–2 | 3–2 |
| Moctezuma | 1–4 | 2–2 | 3–0 | 3–1 | 1–2 | — | 2–0 | 5–2 | 3–4 | 2–1 | 0–0 | 2–1 |
| Monterrey | 0–1 | 3–0 | 2–0 | 2–1 | 1–4 | 2–2 | — | 3–1 | | 0–2 | 2–4 | 1–2 |
| Morelia | 0–2 | 6–1 | 3–1 | 0–2 | 3–1 | 2–0 | 2–1 | — | 1–3 | 2–0 | 0–1 | 1–2 |
| Oviedo | 2–6 | 3–3 | 3–3 | 0–1 | 1–5 | 1–1 | 1–2 | 1–2 | — | 1–4 | 1–2 | 2–1 |
| Querétaro | 2–3 | 0–1 | 1–5 | 0–2 | 2–1 | 0–0 | 2–0 | 2–1 | 2–0 | — | 4–1 | 1–0 |
| San Sebastián | 4–1 | 2–3 | 1–1 | 4–1 | 1–1 | 3–2 | 3–0 | 5–1 | 3–0 | 1–0 | — | 4–3 |
| Zamora | 3–2 | 2–1 | 4–0 | 1–2 | 3–4 | 4–1 | 1–0 | 2–0 | 3–1 | 0–1 | 0–0 | — |

Source: RSSSF
Legend: Blue = home team win; Yellow = draw; Red = away team win.

== Notes ==
1. Match awarded to La Piedad.
