= Sergio Hernández (footballer, born 2004) =

Mexican footballer (born 2004)

Personal information
- Full name: Sergio Ismael Hernández Flores
- Date of birth: 2 May 2004 (age 22)
- Place of birth: Zapopan, Jalisco, Mexico
- Height: 1.63 m (5 ft 4 in)
- Position: Midfielder

Team information
- Current team: Atlas
- Number: 23

Youth career
- 2021–: Atlas

Senior career*
Years	Team	Apps	(Gls)
2025–	Atlas	43	(0)
- * Club domestic league appearances and goals as of 20 November 2026

Sergio Ismael Hernández Flores (born 2 May 2004) is a Mexican professional footballer who plays as a midfielder for Liga MX club Atlas.

== Club career ==
Hernández began his career at the academy of Atlas before making his professional debut on 11 July 2025 against Puebla, playing 73 minutes in a 3–2 win.

== Career statistics ==
=== Club ===
As of match played on 20 November 2026

Club	Season	League			Cup		Continental		Other		Total	
Club	Season	Division	Apps	Goals	Apps	Goals	Apps	Goals	Apps	Goals	Apps	Goals
Atlas	2025–26	Liga MX	28	0	—		—		3 (Note: Appearances in Leagues Cup)	0	31	0
Atlas	2026–27	Liga MX	15	0	—		—		3	0	18	0
Career total			43	0	0	0	0	0	6	0	49	0
