= 1957–58 Mexican Primera División season =

15th professional season of the top-flight football league in Mexico

Primera División de México
- Season: 1957–58
- Champions: Zacatepec (2nd title)
- Relegated: Tampico
- Matches: 182
- Goals: 571 (3.14 per match)

Statistics of the Primera División de México for the 1957–58 season.

== Overview ==
Zamora (Segunda División Champion) were promoted to Primera División.

Atlético Morelia (second place in Segunda División) was also promoted to Primera División, to replace Puebla.

The season was contested by 14 teams, and Zacatepec won the championship.

Tampico was relegated to Segunda División.

=== Teams ===
Location of the 1957-58 Primera División teams

Team	City	Stadium
América	Mexico City	Olímpico Universitario
Atlante	Mexico City	Ciudad de los Deportes
Atlas	Guadalajara, Jalisco	Parque Oblatos
Cuautla	Cuautla, Morelos	El Almeal
Guadalajara	Guadalajara, Jalisco	Parque Oblatos
Irapuato	Irapuato, Guanajuato	Revolución
León	León, Guanajuato	La Martinica
Morelia	Morelia, Michoacán	Campo Morelia
Necaxa	Mexico City	Olímpico Universitario
Oro	Guadalajara, Jalisco	Parque Oblatos
Tampico	Tampico, Tamaulipas	Tampico
Toluca	Toluca, State of Mexico	Héctor Barraza
Zacatepec	Zacatepec, Morelos	Campo del Ingenio
Zamora	Zamora, Michoacán	Moctezuma

== League standings ==
Pos	Team	Pld	W	D	L	GF	GA	GD	Pts	Qualification or relegation
1	Zacatepec	26	17	5	4	44	24	+20	39	Champions
2	Toluca	26	14	6	6	60	29	+31	34	
3	Guadalajara	26	14	5	7	48	27	+21	33	
4	Atlas	26	12	8	6	47	41	+6	32	
5	León	26	11	7	8	40	32	+8	29	
6	Atlante	26	10	7	9	49	37	+12	27	
7	Zamora	26	9	7	10	44	47	−3	25	
8	Irapuato	26	7	9	10	40	45	−5	23	
9	Oro	26	8	6	12	41	53	−12	22	
10	América	26	8	6	12	33	45	−12	22	
11	Necaxa	26	7	7	12	36	51	−15	21	
12	Atlético Morelia	26	7	7	12	35	54	−19	21	
13	Cuautla	26	5	9	12	32	47	−15	19	
14	Tampico	26	5	7	14	22	39	−17	17	Relegated

Source: RSSSF

1957–58 winners

2nd title

== Results ==
Home \ Away	AME	ATE	ATS	CUA	GDL	IRA	LEO	MOR	NEC	ORO	TAM	TOL	ZAC	ZAM
América	—	1–1	3–1	0–3	1–0	2–2	1–1	1–1	2–1	2–2	4–0	0–4	1–2	3–0
Atlante	0–1	—	0–1	1–1	1–2	2–0	2–1	2–0	2–2	4–2	4–0	3–1	0–1	6–2
Atlas	1–0	2–2	—	4–2	2–0	4–1	1–0	3–2	5–3	2–1	4–3	1–2	3–2	1–1
Cuautla	3–0	0–4	1–1	—	0–0	0–0	0–2	1–3	1–2	2–0	2–0	2–2	0–2	1–1
Guadalajara	3–1	2–1	3–0	2–1	—	2–1	0–1	7–0	3–1	2–3	2–1	2–2	1–1	5–1
Irapuato	3–3	0–1	1–1	1–2	1–1	—	2–3	1–1	3–2	1–2	1–0	3–1	0–2	4–2
León	0–1	2–2	3–1	4–2	0–2	2–2	—	5–3	4–1	4–1	0–0	2–1	0–1	1–1
Morelia	2–0	2–1	1–1	4–1	0–4	3–4	1–2	—	1–0	1–4	2–0	0–0	1–1	2–1
Necaxa	2–3	1–5	2–1	2–2	1–0	1–1	0–0	1–1	—	1–3	3–0	2–1	3–0	1–2
Oro	3–2	1–1	1–2	2–0	1–1	1–3	3–0	2–2	1–1	—	2–0	0–3	0–1	2–3
Tampico	3–0	4–0	0–0	1–1	0–1	1–1	1–0	3–2	0–0	1–1	—	0–1	1–2	1–0
Toluca	2–0	5–2	2–2	3–0	2–0	2–0	3–1	5–0	5–1	6–1	1–1	—	1–2	2–0
Zacatepec	1–0	1–0	2–0	3–1	3–1	1–3	0–0	2–0	4–0	4–2	3–1	2–2	—	1–1
Zamora	4–1	2–2	3–3	3–3	1–2	3–1	0–2	2–0	1–2	4–0	2–1	2–1	2–0	—

Updated to match(es) played on 2 February 1958. Source: RSSSF
Legend: Blue = home team win; Yellow = draw; Red = away team win.
