= Atletica =

Mexican sportswear brand

Comercializadora Laser Atletica S.A. de C.V.
- Company type: Private
- Industry: Sporting goods
- Founded: 1995; 31 years ago
- Founder: José Martinez Ramírez
- Headquarters: San Miguel el Alto, Jalisco, Mexico
- Key people: Mario Martinez Barone
- Products: Footwear; Sportswear; Sports equipment Toiletries
- Website: atletica.mx

Comercializadora Laser Atletica S.A. de C.V., commonly referred to as Atletica, is a Mexican sports equipment manufacturer. It was the official sponsor of the Mexican Olympic team from 2000 to 2012 and had previously sponsored several football clubs in the Mexican Primera División. In 2002, Atletica was the sponsor of the Mexico national football team in the 2002 FIFA World Cup.

== Football teams sponsored ==
- (Mexico) Neza FC
- (Mexico) Correcaminos UAT
- Mexico Olympic Team (until 2012)

=== Past teams ===
Since its inception into the sporting market, Atletica has also manufactured kits for national sides for such as:

==== National teams ====
- Belize (2003–06)
- Bolivia (2000–05)
- Costa Rica (2000–01)
- El Salvador (2003, 2005, 2008)
- Guatemala (1998–04)
- Mexico (2000–02)
- Trinidad and Tobago (2000)
- Venezuela (2000–05)

==== Club teams ====
- (United States) Dallas Burn (2001–04)
- (United States) Colorado Rapids (2003–04)
- (United States) New England Revolution (2000)
- (Canada) Montreal Impact
- (Costa Rica) C.D. Saprissa (2000–03)
- (Costa Rica) Liga Deportiva Alajuelense

* (Mexico) Unión de Curtidores (1998–99)

* (Mexico) Toluca FC (2000–10)

- (Mexico) Correcaminos UAT (2000)
- (Mexico) Santos Laguna (2000–10)
- (Mexico) Alacranes de Durango (1999–2000)
- (Mexico) Real Sociedad de Zacatecas (2002–03) ^{(2)}
- (Mexico) Chivas de Guadalajara (1998–2003)
- (Mexico) Leones Negros ()
- (Mexico) Atlas (1995–2001 & 2007–2012)
- (Mexico) Dorados de Sinaloa (2004)
- (Mexico) Pachuca (1997–2004)
- (Mexico) Atlante (2008–10)
- (Mexico) León (1997–2004)
- (Mexico) Atlético/Monarcas Morelia (1997–2012)
- (Mexico) Tigres UANL (1999–2006)
- (Mexico) Tecos (2002–07)
- (Mexico) C.F. Monterrey (1999–2007)
- (Mexico) Indios (2006–07)
- (Mexico) CD Veracruz (2007–09)
- (Mexico) Club Puebla (1999–2010)
- (Mexico) Club Tijuana (2004–10)

==== Personalities ====
- (Mexico) Several Times World Champion Professional Boxer Erik "Terrible" Morales (2004)
- (Mexico) Professional Goalkeeper, Twice CONCACAF Gold Cup holder Oswaldo Sánchez (2005)
- (Mexico) LPGA Champion Professional Golfer Lorena Ochoa (2004)
- (Mexico) Kart, Indy & NASCAR Professional Racer Adrian Fernández (Early 2000s)

* (Mexico) Professional F1 Racer Sergio "Checo" Pérez (2012)

==== International Alliance ====
* (United States) NFL Dallas Cowboys (2003)

- Costa Rica Olympic Committee Rio 2016
