= Efraín Flores =

Mexican football manager (born 1958)

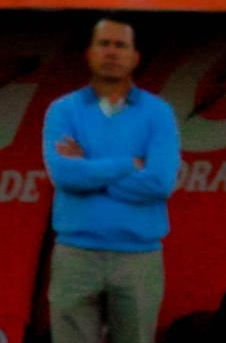
- Flores in 2011

Personal information
- Full name: Efraín Flores Mercado
- Date of birth: 6 February 1958 (age 68)
- Place of birth: Juchipila, Zacatecas, Mexico

Managerial career
- Years: Team
- 1994–1997: Atlas
- 2001: Atlas
- 2002: León
- 2007–2009: Guadalajara
- 2010: Mexico (interim)
- 2011–2012: Pachuca
- 2017: Zacatecas

Efraín Flores Mercado (born 6 February 1958) is a Mexican professional football manager.

== Career ==
Flores was named coach during the mid Apertura 2007 tournament, taking over for José Manuel de la Torre. He has coached Atlas, Leon, Guadalajara and Pachuca.

Flores was the Interim Head coach of the Selección de fútbol de México (Mexico national team) for three games. In his first match with the Mexico national team, he was an assistant to Enrique Meza as they drew against world champions and No. 1 world ranking, Spain. This feat gained him very much attention and has renewed the pride and stature of the Mexico national team.
