= 1952–53 Mexican Segunda División season =

Segunda División de México
- Season: 1952–53
- Champions: Toluca (1st title)
- Matches: 132
- Goals: 483 (3.66 per match)
- Top goalscorer: Mateo de la Tijera (22 goals)

The 1952-53 Segunda División de México season was the third tournament in this competition. Initially it counted with the participation of 13 teams, however, after Match 20 Cuautla was disqualified due to undue alignment and other irregularities. Toluca was the winner.

== Teams ==
1952-53 Season Teams

Team	City	Stadium
Atlético Veracruz	Veracruz, Veracruz	Parque Deportivo Veracruzano
Cuautla	Cuautla, Morelos	El Almeal
Estrella Roja	Toluca, State of Mexico	Campo Patria
Irapuato F.C.	Irapuato, Guanajuato	Revolución
La Concepción	Puebla, Puebla	Parque El Mirador
Moctezuma	Orizaba, Veracruz	Moctezuma
Monterrey	Monterrey, Nuevo León	Tecnológico
C.D. Morelia	Morelia, Michoacán	Campo Morelia
Querétaro F.C.	Querétaro, Querétaro	Municipal de Querétaro
San Sebastián	León, Guanajuato	La Martinica
Deportivo Toluca	Toluca, State of Mexico	Héctor Barraza
C.D. Veracruz	Veracruz, Veracruz	Parque Deportivo Veracruzano
C.D. Zamora	Zamora, Michoacán	Parque Juan Carreño

== League standings ==
Pos	Team	Pld	W	D	L	GF	GA	GD	Pts
1	Toluca (C)	22	14	7	1	37	21	+16	35
2	C.D. Veracruz	22	13	6	3	50	23	+27	32
3	Irapuato	22	11	6	5	41	29	+12	28
4	Moctezuma	22	9	6	7	42	40	+2	24
5	Querétaro	22	9	6	7	35	35	0	24
6	La Concepción	22	9	5	8	41	38	+3	23
7	San Sebastián	22	6	7	9	50	47	+3	19
8	Morelia	22	7	5	10	40	48	−8	19
9	Zamora	22	6	6	10	35	42	−7	18
10	Atlético Veracruz	22	8	0	14	46	72	−26	16
11	Estrella Roja	22	6	2	14	36	62	−26	14
12	Monterrey	22	5	2	15	30	45	−15	12
13	Cuautla (D)	0	–	–	–	–	–	—	0

(C) Champions; (D) Disqualified

== Results ==
Home \ Away	AVE	CUA	ESR	IRA	LCO	MOC	MTY	MOR	QRO	SEB	TOL	VER	ZAM
At. Veracruz	—	–	4–3	3–2	4–2	1–2	3–0	4–2	1–3	3–2	0–2	4–0	4–2
Cuautla	–	—	–	–	–	–	–	–	–	–	–	–	–
Estrella Roja	3–1	–	—	2–0	1–1	0–3	2–3	2–4	4–0	3–3	2–7	2–1	3–2
Irapuato	4–1	–	2–0	—	5–1	2–2	1–0	2–1	2–2	3–2	3–3	0–0	1–0
La Concepción	5–1	–	4–2	0–0	—	1–0	3–0	4–2	3–1	2–2	3–4	1–2	2–0
Moctezuma	4–1	–	3–0	2–3	1–1	—	2–2	3–0	1–0	3–1	2–2	2–2	2–0
Monterrey	3–2	–	1–2	1–2	2–3	3–0	—	0–1	0–1	2–0	3–1	1–3	1–2
Morelia	3–0	–	8–1	2–2	2–0	2–2	3–2	—	1–1	3–2	1–1	0–0	0–2
Querétaro	4–1	–	4–0	1–3	1–1	2–0	1–0	2–1	—	3–1	2–2	1–3	2–1
San Sebastián	9–5	–	4–2	2–1	1–3	5–0	2–1	4–0	1–1	—	3–3	1–2	1–1
Toluca	5–2	–	3–0	2–1	2–0	3–1	7–2	6–0	3–1	2–0	—	1–0	1–1
C.D. Veracruz	5–1	–	2–0	2–1	3–1	5–2	2–1	5–2	4–0	1–1	0–0	—	7–0
Zamora	7–0	–	1–0	0–1	2–0	2–4	2–2	3–2	2–2	3–3	1–3	1–1	—

Updated to match(es) played on 25 January 1953. Source: RSSSF
Legend: Blue = home team win; Yellow = draw; Red = away team win.

== Moves ==
- Toluca was promoted to First Division.
- La Piedad was relegated from First Division.
- Veracruz was dissolved after this season
- Cuautla re-joined in next season.
- C.D. Anáhuac and Oviedo de Pachuca new expansion teams.
