= C.D. Anáhuac =

Anáhuac
- Full name: Club Deportivo Anáhuac
- Founded: 1952; 74 years ago
- Dissolved: 1955; 71 years ago
- Ground: Estadio Tecnológico; Monterrey, Nuevo León
- Capacity: 36,485
Home colours

Club Deportivo Anáhuac, commonly known as Anáhuac, was a Mexican professional football club based in Monterrey, Nuevo León. The team only played two seasons as a professional club in the Segunda División de México before being disbanded.

== History ==
After disappearing for some time in the 40s, Monterrey, the only professional football club from Northern Mexico at the time, came back in 1952 and asked to join the Segunda División de México for the 1952–53 season. It was expected that the Federación Mexicana de Fútbol (FMF) would accept Monterrey's application. Nevertheless, the application was rejected after only four teams (Veracruz and Querétaro from the Segunda División and Atlante and Marte from the Primera División de México) supported Monterrey's petition.

Due to Monterrey being rejected in professional football, a proposal to create a league with teams from Northern Mexico arose, one of them was Club Deportivo Anáhuac.

After some success as an amateur club, Anáhuac was accepted in the Segunda División de México for the 1953–54 season, thanks to the efforts of Andrés Blanco, Luis Sada Gorostieta and José Ramón Ballina, and under the condition that the club would pay half of the visiting teams expenses when playing in Monterrey. For their first season as a professional club, Anáhuac was managed by the Spanish manager José Muguerza.

Anáhuac finished the season in fourth place with 23 points. For the 1954–55 season, the club finished in seventh place. At the end of the 1955 season, Anáhuac went on hiatus due to economic and financial problems, but it never came back.

== Records ==
=== Season-by-season results ===
Season	Division	Result
1953–54	Segunda División de México	4th
1954–55	Segunda División	7th
