= Atletas Campesinos =

- Full name: Club Nacional de Atletas Campesinos de Querétaro
- Nickname: Campesinos
- Founded: 1977
- Dissolved: 1983, 2012
- Ground: Estadio Municipal, Querétaro, Mexico
- Capacity: 12,000
- Chairman: Armando Presa Fernández
- Manager: Óscar Díaz
- League: Segunda División de México
- Website: http://www.atletascampesinos.com/ns/
Home colours	Away colours

Atletas Campesinos was the first Querétaro football team who played Primera Division, also played for the defunct Segunda Division de Mexico now known as Ascenso MX and hosted its games at Querétaro, Mexico. En 1977 el empresario Armando Presa compró a los dos equipos de la ciudad de Querétaro. Querétaro FC y Estudiantes de Querétaro, el Querétaro FC se le cambió el nombre a Atletas Campesinos y Estudiantes de Querétaro paso a llamarse Industriales de Querétaro.

== History ==
They are remembered in the city of Querétaro to be the first city team to play in the Primera Division. In the late 1970s, Armando Presa purchased Estudiantes de Querétaro from the Segunda Division de Mexico, and renamed them to Atletas Campesinos.

On June 22, 1980, by the management of Antonio Carbajal and Antonio Ascencio, the team achieved promotion to Primera Division after defeating Osos Grises of Toluca in the final, by a score of 2–1 as a visitor in the Estadio Nemesio Díez, after a tie in Estadio Municipal de Querétaro.

The team played two seasons, spent the 1980–81 season with more pain than glory and in the 81–82 season, with reinforcements, a better season was achieved, but without reaching playoffs. For the 1982–83 season, the team was sold to the STPRM (Sindicato de Petróleos Mexicanos / Union of Petroleum Mexicans) and taken to the city of Tampico, with the nickname La Jaiba Brava. Its leading figure was Leonardo Cuellar. The original team shirt showed a tractor but the Mexican Football Federation accused the directors of display advertising on the shirt since back then it was forbidden but the tractor did not show or promote any brand tractors in particular. The Federation, began to mistreat the team, one of the reasons why it was sold.

Team was reformed and began operation in the Tercera División de México on June 25, 2011, having the memorable presence of Antonio Carbajal who as coach helped get the team promoted in the late 70's and early 80's. They played in Group IX of the Central Region.

At the end of 2012 there were administrative problems and the club that had been refurbished disappeared again, becoming the franchise Cobras de Querétaro.
