= 1955–56 Mexican Primera División season =

13th professional season of the top-flight football league in Mexico

Primera División de México
- Season: 1955–56
- Champions: León (4th title)
- Relegated: Zamora
- Matches: 183
- Goals: 574 (3.14 per match)

Statistics of the Primera División de México for the 1955–56 season.

== Overview ==
Atlas (Segunda División 1954-55 Champion), Zamora and Cuautla (second and third place in a promotional tournament in Segunda División) were promoted to Primera División, to increase the number of teams to 14 clubs.

The season was contested by 14 teams, and León won the championship.

Zamora was relegated to Segunda División.

=== Teams ===
Location of the 1955-56 Primera División teams

| Team | City | Stadium |
|---|---|---|
| América | Mexico City | Olímpico Universitario |
| Atlante | Mexico City | Ciudad de los Deportes |
| Atlas | Guadalajara, Jalisco | Parque Oblatos |
| Cuautla | Cuautla, Morelos | El Almeal |
| Guadalajara | Guadalajara, Jalisco | Parque Oblatos |
| Irapuato | Irapuato, Guanajuato | Revolución |
| León | León, Guanajuato | La Martinica |
| Necaxa | Mexico City | Olímpico Universitario |
| Oro | Guadalajara, Jalisco | Parque Oblatos |
| Puebla | Puebla, Puebla | Parque El Mirador |
| C.D. Tampico | Tampico, Tamaulipas | Tampico |
| Toluca | Toluca, State of Mexico | Héctor Barraza |
| Zacatepec | Zacatepec, Morelos | Campo del Ingenio |
| Zamora | Zamora, Michoacán | Moctezuma |

== League standings ==
| Pos | Team | Pld | W | D | L | GF | GA | GD | Pts | Qualification or relegation |
|---|---|---|---|---|---|---|---|---|---|---|
| 1 | León | 26 | 15 | 7 | 4 | 50 | 24 | +26 | 37 | Playoff |
| 2 | Oro | 26 | 17 | 3 | 6 | 49 | 32 | +17 | 37 | Playoff |
| 3 | Atlante | 26 | 13 | 6 | 7 | 53 | 37 | +16 | 32 | |
| 4 | Toluca | 26 | 11 | 9 | 6 | 49 | 31 | +18 | 31 | |
| 5 | Necaxa | 26 | 12 | 7 | 7 | 44 | 35 | +9 | 31 | |
| 6 | Tampico | 26 | 12 | 7 | 7 | 39 | 32 | +7 | 31 | |
| 7 | Zacatepec | 26 | 11 | 5 | 10 | 40 | 36 | +4 | 27 | |
| 8 | América | 26 | 10 | 4 | 12 | 51 | 47 | +4 | 24 | |
| 9 | Irapuato | 26 | 8 | 6 | 12 | 35 | 43 | −8 | 22 | |
| 10 | Guadalajara | 26 | 5 | 11 | 10 | 33 | 35 | −2 | 21 | |
| 11 | Cuautla | 26 | 6 | 9 | 11 | 28 | 46 | −18 | 21 | |
| 12 | Atlas | 26 | 8 | 4 | 14 | 41 | 54 | −13 | 20 | |
| 13 | Puebla | 26 | 6 | 4 | 16 | 33 | 64 | −31 | 16 | |
| 14 | Zamora | 26 | 2 | 10 | 14 | 23 | 51 | −28 | 14 | Relegated |

Source: RSSSF

== Results ==
| Home \ Away | AME | ATE | ATS | CUA | GDL | IRA | LEO | NEC | ORO | PUE | TAM | TOL | ZAC | ZAM |
|---|---|---|---|---|---|---|---|---|---|---|---|---|---|---|
| América | — | 0–1 | 5–2 | 0–0 | 3–0 | 1–1 | 0–2 | 1–2 | 1–2 | 6–0 | 1–2 | 3–2 | 1–1 | 1–1 |
| Atlante | 3–4 | — | 1–0 | 1–1 | 0–0 | 3–1 | 1–2 | 2–0 | 3–1 | 5–2 | 3–0 | 0–4 | 3–1 | 7–1 |
| Atlas | 3–2 | 2–3 | — | 3–2 | 2–1 | 3–2 | 1–2 | 2–1 | 2–4 | 5–3 | 1–1 | 1–2 | 3–1 | 3–1 |
| Cuautla | 1–3 | 0–0 | 1–1 | — | 0–0 | 2–1 | 0–0 | 1–1 | 0–1 | 2–0 | 1–0 | 0–1 | 2–2 | 3–0 |
| Guadalajara | 1–2 | 1–2 | 3–0 | 1–4 | — | 2–0 | 1–1 | 1–2 | 1–3 | 6–1 | 1–1 | 1–1 | 2–0 | 4–1 |
| Irapuato | 2–1 | 1–3 | 3–2 | 2–0 | 1–1 | — | 2–2 | 1–0 | 2–0 | 1–2 | 2–0 | 1–1 | 1–0 | 2–2 |
| León | 5–1 | 3–1 | 3–0 | 7–0 | 2–2 | 2–1 | — | 3–0 | 2–2 | 2–0 | 1–1 | 2–1 | 3–1 | 2–1 |
| Necaxa | 2–0 | 1–1 | 2–2 | 5–2 | 1–1 | 3–2 | 4–1 | — | 3–0 | 2–1 | 2–2 | 2–1 | 2–2 | 1–0 |
| Oro | 3–2 | 2–3 | 2–0 | 3–0 | 1–0 | 4–1 | 0–2 | 2–1 | — | 6–1 | 2–1 | 3–1 | 2–1 | 1–0 |
| Puebla | 2–3 | 2–1 | 2–1 | 2–4 | 0–0 | 2–2 | 2–0 | 0–3 | 1–2 | — | 5–2 | 0–0 | 0–1 | 2–2 |
| Tampico | 2–1 | 2–1 | 1–1 | 5–0 | 2–1 | 1–2 | 1–0 | 2–0 | 0–0 | 3–1 | — | 2–2 | 0–2 | 1–0 |
| Toluca | 2–3 | 2–2 | 1–0 | 4–0 | 2–2 | 3–0 | 1–0 | 1–1 | 2–0 | 4–0 | 2–3 | — | 3–1 | 1–1 |
| Zacatepec | 4–3 | 2–1 | 2–0 | 3–1 | 3–0 | 2–1 | 0–1 | 4–1 | 1–2 | 1–0 | 0–1 | 1–1 | — | 3–1 |
| Zamora | 1–3 | 2–2 | 3–1 | 1–1 | 0–0 | 1–0 | 0–0 | 0–2 | 1–1 | 0–2 | 0–3 | 2–4 | 1–1 | — |

Updated to match(es) played on 22 January 1956. Source: RSSSF
Legend: Blue = home team win; Yellow = draw; Red = away team win.

== Championship playoff ==
March 25, 1956

| León | 4-2 | Oro |
|---|---|---|
| Mateo de la Tijera 47', 56', 80'; Marcos Aurelio 30' | | Marcos Aurelio 2'; Walter Meneses 43' |

Estadio Olímpico Universitario, Mexico City

1955–56 winners

4th title
