= Atlas F.C. =

Association football club in Mexico

Atlas
- Full name: Atlas Fútbol Club
- Nicknames: Los Rojinegros (The Red-and-Blacks); Los Zorros (The Foxes); La Academia (The Academy); La Furia (The Fury); Las Margaritas
- Short name: ATS
- Founded: 15 August 1916; 110 years ago
- Stadium: Estadio Jalisco
- Capacity: 56,713
- Owner: Grupo PRODI
- President: Gerardo Casanova
- Manager: Hernán Crespo
- League: Liga MX
- Apertura 2026: Regular phase: 4th of 18; Final phase: TBD
- Website: atlasfc.com.mx
Home colours	Away colours

Atlas Fútbol Club is a professional football club based in Guadalajara, Jalisco. The club competes in Liga MX, the highest level of Mexican football, and plays its home matches at Estadio Jalisco. Founded in 1916, it was one of ten founding clubs of the professional era of the Liga Mayor (current Liga MX) in the 1943–44 season. Nicknamed Rojinegros due to their traditional colors (red and black) on the club's crest and uniform.

In domestic competitions, Atlas FC has won three Liga MX titles, four Copa MX titles and five Campeón de Campeones. Atlas won both tournaments in the 2021–22 Liga MX season, becoming the third "Mexican Bicampeón" in the era of short tournaments. Atlas has a big rivalry with city rivals Guadalajara, known as El Clásico Tapatío.

== History ==
Atlas was founded in a bar in Guadalajara, Mexico, where a few friends recalled their friends experience while studying at Ampleforth College in North Yorkshire, England. In August 1916, Alfonso and Juan José "Lico" Cortina, Pedro "Perico" and Carlos Fernández del Valle, the three Orendain brothers and Federico Collignon (who had studied in Berlin) finally decided to set up a football team. They chose the name "Atlas" based on the Titan of Greek mythology of the same name, and chose red and black as the club's colours to mimic those of Ampleforth College whose patron saint, St Lawrence, was also chosen as the patron saint of Atlas. The red signifies the blood of St Lawrence and the black signifies his martyrdom. Occasionally the crest of Ampleforth College is seen hanging from a banner in the stadium.

The first title for the club was the Copa MX in 1945–46, where they beat Atlante in the final. That same year, they won the supercup (league vs. cup champion) against Veracruz 3–2. Four years later, Atlas won their second Copa MX, in the 1949–50 season. The following year, in the 1950–51 Mexican Primera División season, Atlas won its first league title, with twelve wins in 22 matches. However, just two years later, Atlas was relegated for the first time after losing 4–0 against Tampico. But the following season, Atlas made an immediate return to the top flight.

Atlas had a golden age in the late 1990s under the management of Ricardo La Volpe, with promising players such as Rafael Márquez, Daniel Osorno, Juan Pablo Rodriguez, Pavel Pardo, Mario Méndez, Omar Briceño, and Miguel Zepeda, but even though they had a team with enormous talent and reached the Verano 1999 final, they couldn't conquer the title and lost against Deportivo Toluca in a match defined by penalties after a 5–5 draw on aggregate and with extra time.

In 2000, Atlas participated in the Copa Libertadores for the first time. They began their campaign in a round-robin preliminary stage where they played against Club America, Deportivo Táchira, and Deportivo Italchacao. Their first match was a 2–0 loss to America, followed by draws against Tachira and Italchacao. However they would recover and finish top of the group after beating America 6–3 and then beating Tachira, followed by a draw against Italchacao. As a result, Atlas gained entry into the proper competition in group 4 alongside River Plate, U. de Chile and Atletico Nacional. The Guadalajara-based club's first match was on 23 February, a 1–1 draw against River. Their next match was a 3–2 win against Atletico Nacional in Medellín. The club then drew against U. de Chile and lost to River, followed by a 5–1 rout of Colombian champions Nacional, but a loss in their final match against U. de Chile in Santiago. Although Atlas finished level with U. de Chile on points, a better goal difference would see them go through. In the round of 16, the Mexican club defeated Colombian club Atlético Junior 5–1 on aggregate and were through to the quarter-finals, where their run would end after losing twice to eventual runner-up Palmeiras and being eliminated 5–2 on aggregate.

In 2008, Atlas made their second appearance in the Copa Libertadores. Their campaign started with a qualifying tournament called InterLiga where they faced Toluca, Morelia, and America. At the end of the InterLiga they were tied on points and goal difference with Toluca, so a coin toss decided who would advance to the next round. Atlas won the coin toss and advanced to the first stage, where they defeated Bolivian club La Paz 2–1 on aggregate. In the group stage with Boca Juniors, Colo-Colo, and Maracaibo, Atlas finished first with eleven points, including notable victories against Boca Juniors and Colo-Colo. In the round of 16 they would eliminate Lanus 3–2 on aggregate. In the quarter-finals, they were matched up with Boca Juniors again. In the first leg, played in Buenos Aires, Atlas secured a 2–2 draw, but in the second leg in Guadalajara, Boca won 3–0 and eliminated the club.

Atlas qualified for the 2015 Copa Libertadores after finishing second on the table in the 2014 Apertura. The team was led by Tomás Boy and was matched up in the group stage with Independiente Santa Fe, Atletico Mineiro, and Colo-Colo. In their first match they lost 1–0 to Santa Fe, but in the second match they had a historic 1–0 victory against Atletico Mineiro in Brazil, which ended a 37-year undefeated home streak for the club in the Copa Libertadores. Atlas later beat Atletico again at home, but exited the competition with a last-placed finish in the group and a loss to Santa Fe in Bogotá.

On 12 December 2021, Atlas ended a 70-year title drought when they defeated Club León at the Estadio Jalisco via penalties 4–3 and won their second league title.

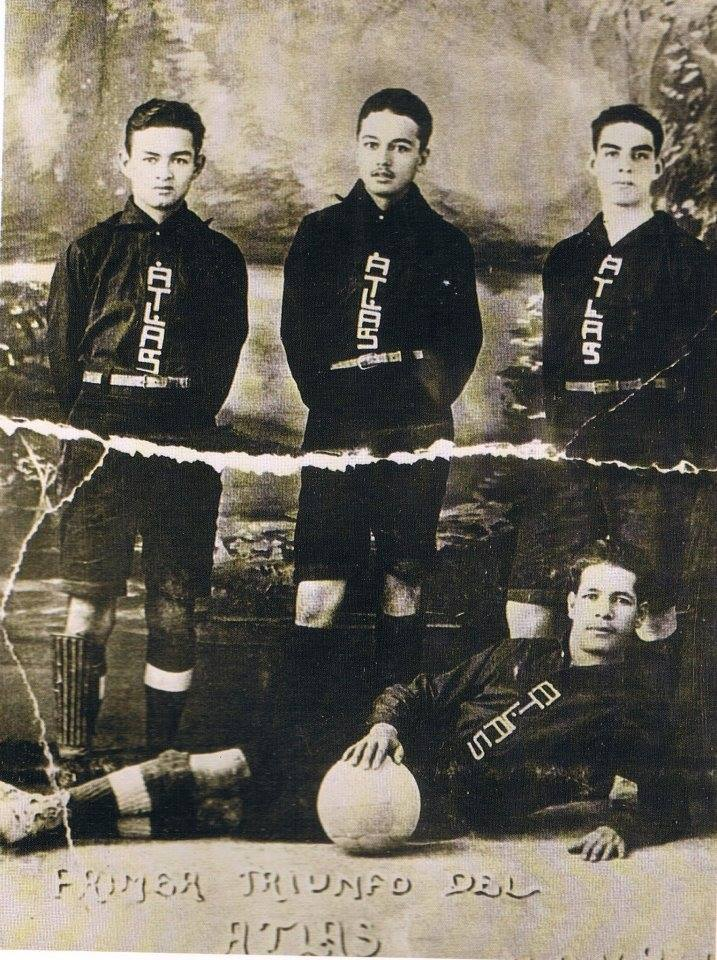
Atlas 1916 first team

On 5 March 2022, during a match between Atlas and Querétaro at Querétaro's stadium, a riot broke out between fans attending the match. Videos posted on social media showed groups of men beating, kicking, dragging and stripping victims. According to the Querétaro state civil protection agency, at least 22 men were injured. The Liga MX sanctioned Querétaro by banning Querétaro-affiliated barras from attending home matches for up to six months in response to the riots. Atlas were awarded a 0–3 win for the game which was abandoned at 0–1.

Atlas won its third league championship on 29 May 2022 against Pachuca. In the first leg on 26 May, Atlas defeated Pachuca at Estadio Jalisco 2–0, and although they lost the second leg 2–1, they won 3–2 on aggregate to become only the third team in league history to win back to back titles.

In July 2025, Grupo Orlegi announced that it had put Atlas up for sale due to Liga MX regulations that sought to end multi-ownership of teams after the 2026 FIFA World Cup. In April 2026, the purchase of the club by Grupo PRODI, a company headed by José Miguel Bejos, who also owns Pericos de Puebla, a baseball team, was announced, with the company taking possession of the team at the end of the Clausura 2026 tournament. On October 7, 2026, the construction of a new stadium for the club was announced.

== Youth Academy ==
Atlas are renowned for having a successful youth academy setup. In the last few decades, Atlas have developed many players who have gone on to have professional careers domestically and internationally. Many young players enter the Atlas youth academy knowing that they'll have a strong possibility to play with the first team due to the club philosophy of allowing youth players the opportunity to be promoted to the first team. Although Atlas has only won the league championship three times, their academy has been famous for developing players for the Mexico national football team in the past few decades like Jared Borgetti, Daniel Osorno, José de Jesús Corona, Pável Pardo, Oswaldo Sánchez, Rafael Márquez, Juan Carlos Medina, Jorge Hernández, Mario Méndez, Miguel Zepeda, Juan Pablo Rodriguez, Juan Pablo Garcia, Gerardo Espinoza, Jorge Torres Nilo, Edgar Ivan Pacheco, Andrés Guardado, Jeremy Márquez, Diego Barbosa and many more. The club's lower youth divisions have achieved many titles domestically as well as internationally.

== Stadium ==
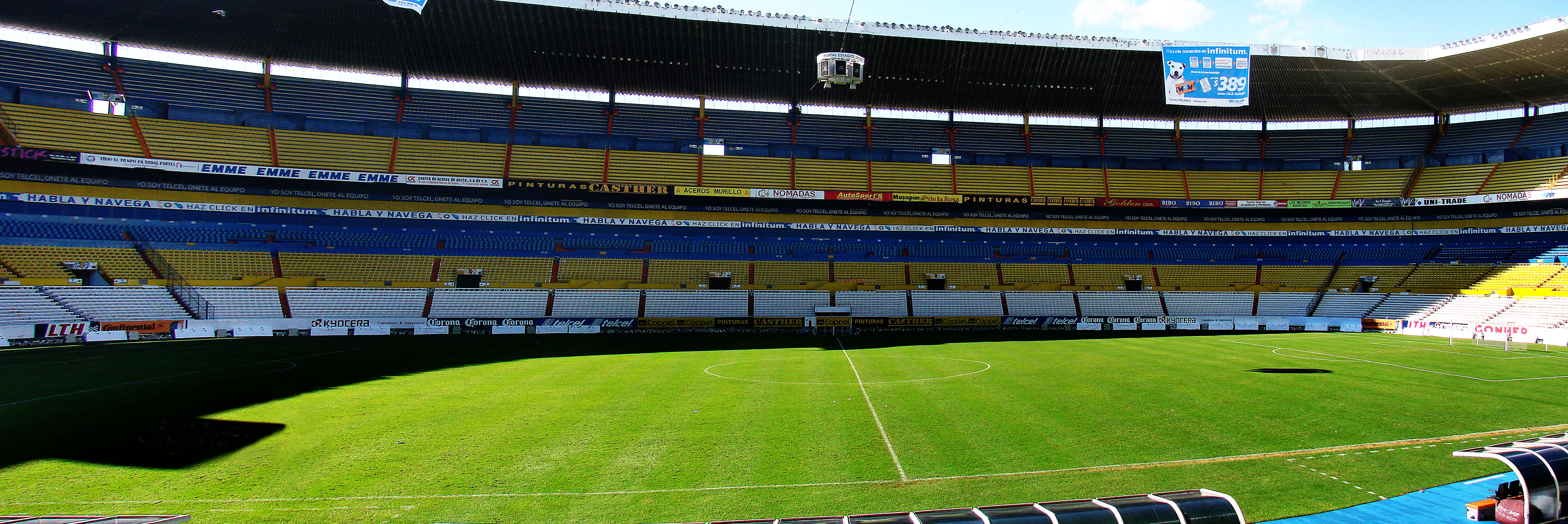
Panoramic view of Estadio Jalisco

Atlas currently plays in the Estadio Jalisco, which is the third largest stadium in Mexico and was constructed on 31 January 1960. It is a venue that has played host to historic matches and teams including Pelé's Brazil in 1970. In total, It was host for 8 games in the 1970 FIFA World Cup, 6 of which were from group stage matches, and two were quarter and semi-finals. Subsequently, the stadium was again host for 9 games in the 1986 FIFA World Cup, 6 of which were group stage matches, 1 was round of sixteen and the last 2 were quarter and semi-finals.

== Supporters and rivalry ==
Atlas fans are as a whole collectively known as La Fiel (The Faithful), while La Barra 51 is the main organized supporter group. La Barra 51's name recalls Atlas' first championship in the Primera División de México in 1951. Through the team's struggling performance La Fiel has earned its name, supporting the team for 70 years without any major accomplishments.

Atlas also has notable supporters such as Guadalajara natives Canelo Álvarez, Peso Pluma, and Alejandro Fernández.

=== Clásico Tapatío ===
Atlas' fierce rivals are Guadalajara city-rivals C.D. Guadalajara, known as Chivas. The derby is known as the Clásico Tapatío and is said to be the oldest football derby in Mexico, dating back to 1916. The first match between the two sides was a friendly that took place shortly after Atlas were founded, the game ended 0–0. The first competitive match between the two sides came in the 1917 "Torneo de Primavera", which translates into English as the "Tournament of Spring". Atlas were victorious this time round, winning 2–1. The game sparked controversy, however, when complaints of a bad refereeing performance were put forward by Chivas. Chivas were so angered by the result, that they refused to play in the next "Liga Amateur de Jalisco" tournament of 1917–18, unless the president of refereeing, Justo García Godoy, resigned from his position; when Godoy failed to do so, Chivas refused to join the tournament.

Chivas are the most victorious in Guadalajara derbies, however, winning 16 of 35 competitive fixtures the two sides have played. Atlas have only won 9 and the sides have drawn 8 times.

== Personnel ==
=== Management ===
Position	Staff
President	(Mexico) Gerardo Casanova
Vice President of Operations	(Portugal) Urgel Martins
Commercial Director	(Mexico) Álvaro García Rulfo
Director of academy	(Spain) Antonio Solana

Source: Liga MX

=== Coaching staff ===
Position	Staff
Manager	(Argentina) Hernán Crespo
Assistant managers	(Argentina) Víctor López
Assistant managers	(Argentina) Juan Branda
Assistant managers	(Mexico) Omar Flores
Fitness coach	(Argentina) Federico Martinetti
Goalkeeper coach	(Mexico) Armando Navarrete
Team doctor	(Mexico) Rodrigo Ambriz
Physiotherapist	(Argentina) Rodrigo Nicolau

== Players ==
=== First-team squad ===
As of 11 September 2026

Note: Flags indicate national team as defined under FIFA eligibility rules; some limited exceptions apply. Players may hold more than one non-FIFA nationality.

No.	Pos.	Nation	Player
3	DF	MEX	Jorge Sánchez
4	DF	MEX	Adrián Mora
5	DF	MEX	Jorge Rodríguez
6	MF	MEX	Édgar Zaldívar
8	FW	MAR	Ryan Mmaee
9	FW	ARG	Florián Monzón
10	MF	POR	Luís Esteves
11	FW	CPV	Duk
12	GK	COL	Camilo Vargas (vice-captain)
13	DF	MEX	Gaddi Aguirre
15	DF	MEX	Paulo Ramírez
16	DF	ARG	Milton Valenzuela

No.	Pos.	Nation	Player
17	DF	MEX	Rivaldo Lozano
18	MF	MEX	Elías Montiel
19	DF	ARG	Adonis Frías
20	MF	ARG	Kevin Zenón
22	GK	MEX	Antonio Sánchez
23	MF	MEX	Sergio Hernández
26	MF	MEX	Aldo Rocha (captain)
27	MF	MEX	Víctor Ríos
28	DF	ARG	Manuel Capasso
44	DF	MEX	Juanjo Purata (on loan from Tigres UANL)
58	MF	MEX	Alfonso González

=== Youth squad ===
Note: Flags indicate national team as defined under FIFA eligibility rules; some limited exceptions apply. Players may hold more than one non-FIFA nationality.

No.	Pos.	Nation	Player
192	MF	MEX	Jesús Serrato
203	FW	MEX	José Martín

No.	Pos.	Nation	Player
208	MF	MEX	Jesús Guillén

=== Out on loan ===
Note: Flags indicate national team as defined under FIFA eligibility rules; some limited exceptions apply. Players may hold more than one non-FIFA nationality.

No. / Pos. / Nation / Player; — / DF / MEX / Carlos Robles (at Atlético La Paz)	No. / Pos. / Nation / Player; — / FW / ECU / Jordy Caicedo (at Huracán)

== Kit sponsors and manufacturers ==
Period	Kit manufacturer	Shirt partner
1989–90	Pajarito Sport	Helados Bing
1990–91	Vicmar	Peñafiel
1991–92	Pajarito Sport	Peñafiel
1992–93	Vicmar	Peñafiel
1993–94	Umbro	Tecate
1994–95	Aba Sport	Tecate
1995–96	Aba Sport	No Sponsors
1996–99	Atletica	Corona Extra/Estrella Jalisco
1999–00	Atletica	Corona Extra/Coca-Cola/Estrella Jalisco
2000–01	Atletica	Coca-Cola/Omnilife/Corona Extra
2001–02	Nike	Coca-Cola/Omnilife/Corona Extra
2002–03	Nike	Coca-Cola/Corona Extra
2003–04	Nike	Coca-Cola/Corona Extra/Telcel
2004–05	Kappa	Coca-Cola/Bedoyecta
2005–06	Kappa	Coca-Cola/Sky/Corona Extra
2006–07	Kappa	Bedoyecta/Coca-Cola/Corona Extra
2007–08	Atletica	Bedoyecta/Coca-Cola/Corona Extra/Sky/Megacable
2008–09	Atletica	DiversityCapital/Coca-Cola/Corona Extra/Sky/Megacable
2009–10	Atletica	Jalisco/Coca-Cola/Corona Extra
2010–11	Atletica	Coca-Cola/Lubricantes Akron/Corona Extra
2011–12	Atletica	Coca-Cola/Guadalajara 2011/Lubricantes Akron/Corona Extra
Apertura 2012	Atletica	Coca-Cola/Lubricantes Akron/Corona Extra
2013–14	Nike	Coca-Cola/Casas Javer/Corona Extra/Volaris/Sky
2014–17	Puma	Bridgestone/Coca-Cola/Sky Sports/Azteca/Corona Extra/Banco Azteca/Volaris
2017–18	Adidas	Corona Extra/Coca-Cola/Sky Sports/Azteca/Banco Azteca/Volaris
2018–19	Adidas	Estrella Jalisco/Coca-Cola/Totalplay/Linio/Banco Azteca/Ganabet/Mobil Super
2019–2020	Adidas	MoPlay/Urrea/Oxxo Gas/Banco Azteca/Bud Light/INTERprotección/Unifin
2020–	Charly	Banco Azteca/Urrea/Perdura/Caliente.mx/Carl's Jr./Dulces de la Rosa/Berel/VivaAerobus/Dalton Seminuevos/Hospital Country 2000/Lubricantes Akron/Galletas Cayro/Electrolit/Totalplay/Seguros Atlas/Red Cola/Omnibus de México

== Managers ==
- (Argentina) Javier Valdivieso (1943–44)
- (Argentina) Eduardo Valdatti (1944–54)
- (Argentina) Raúl Leguizamón (1954–56)
- (Mexico) Felipe Zetter (1956–58)
- (Hungary) Jorge Marik (1958–60)
- (Argentina) Eduardo Valdatti (1960–61)
- (Brazil) Bauer (1961–63)
- (Argentina) Enrique Álvarez Vega (1963–64)
- (Argentina) Javier Novello (1964–66)
- (Hungary) Árpád Fekete (1966–67)
- (Argentina) Javier Novello (1967)
- (Argentina) José Gómez (1968)
- (Brazil) Ney Blanco de Oliveira (1968–69)
- (Argentina) Enrique Álvarez Vega (1969–70)
- (Hungary) Árpád Fekete (1970–71)
- (Mexico) Alfredo Torres (1971–74)
- (Socialist Federal Republic of Yugoslavia) Miloš Milutinović (1975–76)
- (Mexico) Alfredo Torres (1976–77)
- (Mexico) Odilón Mireles (1977)
- (Peru) Claudio Lostasau (1978)
- (Mexico) Alfredo Torres (1978–80)
- (Mexico) Alfonso Portugal (1980–81)
- (Mexico) José Antonio Roca (1 July 1981 – 30 June 1982)
- (Hungary) Árpád Fekete (1982–83)
- (Mexico) Ernesto Cisneros (1983–84)
- (Mexico) Alfredo Torres (1984–86)
- (Poland) Waldemar Wasilewski (1986–87)
- (Chile) Carlos Reinoso (1987–88)
- (Mexico) José Luis Real (1988–89)
- (Uruguay) Luis Garisto (1989–92)
- (Chile) Pedro García Barros (1992)
- (Argentina) Mario Zanabria (1 July 1992 – 30 June 1993)
- (Argentina) Marcelo Bielsa (1 July 1993 – 29 January 1995)
- (Argentina) Javier Torrente (29 January 1995 – 3 February 1995)
- (Mexico) Efraín Flores (interim) (3 February 1995 – 30 June 1995)
- (Argentina) Eduardo Solari (1 July 1995 – 28 June 1996)
- (Mexico) Efraín Flores (1 July 1996 – 9 March 1997)
- (Argentina) Ricardo La Volpe (1 July 1997 – 30 June 2001)
- (Mexico) Efraín Flores (22 September 2001 – 31 December 2001)
- (Mexico) Enrique Meza (1 January 2002 – 29 September 2002)
- (Mexico) Fernando Quirarte (3 October 2002 – 16 September 2003)
- (Mexico) Sergio Bueno (19 September 2003 – 17 April 2005)
- (Mexico) Daniel Guzmán (1 July 2005 – 30 April 2006)
- (Argentina) Rubén Romano (1 July 2006 – 18 September 2007)
- (Mexico) Jorge Castañeda (interim) (21 September 2007 – 23 September 2007)
- (Mexico) Tomás Boy (28 September 2007 – 31 December 2007)
- (Argentina) Miguel Ángel Brindisi (6 January 2008 – 4 September 2008)
- (Argentina) Darío Franco (5 September 2008 – 26 January 2009)
- (Argentina) Ricardo La Volpe (28 January 2009 – 1 January 2010)
- (Argentina) Carlos Ischia (1 January 2010 – 23 August 2010)
- (Mexico) José Luis Mata (interim) (24 August 2010 – 17 October 2010)
- (Mexico) Benjamín Galindo (24 August 2010 – 30 June 2011)
- (Argentina) Rubén Romano (1 July 2011 – 22 September 2011)
- (Mexico) Juan Carlos Chávez (22 September 2011 – 27 August 2012)
- (Mexico) Tomás Boy (29 August 2012 – 30 June 2013)
- (Argentina) Omar Asad (1 July 2013 – 16 October 2013)
- (Mexico) José Luis Mata (17 October 13 – 10 November 2013)
- (Mexico) Tomás Boy (6 December 2013 – 17 May 2015)
- (Uruguay) Gustavo Matosas (30 May 2015 – 3 December 2015)
- (Argentina) Gustavo Costas (10 December 2015 – 21 May 2016)
- (Mexico) Jose Guadalupe Cruz (17 June 2016 – 15 January 2018)
- (Mexico) Gerardo Espinoza (15 January 2018 – 25 January 2018)
- (Argentina) Rubén Romano (25 January 2018 – 19 March 2018)
- (Mexico) Gerardo Espinoza (19 March 2018 – 3 September 2018)
- (Argentina) Ángel Guillermo Hoyos (11 September 2018 – 9 March 2019)
- (Argentina) Leandro Cufré (11 March 2019 – 29 January 2020)
- (Mexico) Rafael Puente Jr. (30 January 2020 – 10 August 2020)
- (Argentina) Diego Cocca (11 August 2020 – 1 October 2022)
- (Mexico) Benjamín Mora (6 October 2022 – 30 October 2023)
- (Spain) Beñat San José (24 November 2023 – 9 December 2024)
- (Mexico) Gonzalo Pineda (12 December 2024 – 10 August 2025)
- (Argentina) Diego Cocca (12 August 2025 – 13 July 2026)
- (Argentina) Hernán Crespo (16 July 2026 – )

== Honours ==
Domestic
Type	Competition	Titles	Seasons	Runners-up
Top level FMF	Liga MX	3	1950–51, Ape–2021, Cla–2022	1948–49, 1965–66, Ver–1999
Top level FMF	Copa MX	4	1945–46, 1949–50, 1961–62, 1967–68	1995–96, Ape–2013
Top level FMF	Campeón de Campeones	5	1946, 1950, 1951, 1962, 2022	1968
Top level FMF	Supercopa de la Liga MX	0	—	2022
Lower levels FMF	Segunda División	3	1954–55, 1971–72, 1978–79	—
Lower levels FMF	Copa México Segunda División	0	—	1954–55, 1971–72
Lower levels FMF	Campeón de Campeones Segunda División	1	1972	1955
International
Type	Competition	Titles	Seasons	Runners-up
Regional North America USSF–FMF	Campeones Cup	0	—	2022
