= FC Politécnico =

Politécnico
- Full name: Fútbol Club Politécnico
- Nicknames: Los Burros Blancos (The White Donkeys); Los Atómicos (The Atomic Ones); Los Guindiblancos (The Cherry-Whites)
- Founded: 12 September 1954; 71 years ago
- Ground: Deportivo Eduardo Molina, Venustiano Carranza, Mexico City, Mexico
- Capacity: 500
- Owner: Raúl Milton Vargas
- Manager: Miguel Ángel Limón
- League: Liga TDP - Group IV
- 2020–21: 13th – Group IV
- Website: http://fcpolitecnico.com/
Home colours	Away colours

The Fútbol Club Politécnico, commonly known as Poli, is a Mexican football club based in Mexico City. The club was founded in 2013, and currently plays in Group IV of Liga TDP.

== History ==
=== First Team ===
On September 4, 1954, the Second Division of Mexico accepted the entry of two new teams based in Mexico City: IPN and UNAM, both teams played at Estadio Olímpico Universitario. In 1955, the IPN team changed its ground to Parque Asturias.The Club played its 1st official professional match on September 12 1954 against C.D. Anáhuac losing 2-3 .This season the club would finish 2nd to last in the league winning only 6 games out of 26 .Due to celebration of the II Panamerican Games in Mexico City, U.N.A.M. and I.P.N. left the ground of Estadio Universitario for play their lasts match of the season in Parque Asturias.

In 1955-56 season, the team was runner-up in Segunda División de México Cup, that was the last season of IPN in Second Division, because UNAM and IPN requested not to play the 1957-58 season to restructure their respective teams. The "Pumas" returned in 1958-59, but the Politécnico did not return.

=== 2nd Division 54-57 ===
Season	M	W	T	L	GF	GA	PTS	GAVG
54–55	26	6	4	16	29	52	16	0.5577
55–56	26	6	9	9	30	34	21	0.8824
56–57	24	4	7	13	20	35	15	0.5714

=== Atletas Industriales ===
At the end of the 1970s, the IPN acquired the team Atletas Industriales de Querétaro, however, it never used colors or university identity. In 1981, the club was sold and became Atlético Valladolid.

=== Comeback ===
On November 16, 2013 a new team was founded, FC Politécnico A.C., this team was formed by a group of businessmen who sought to recover the identity of the IPN in football, so the team began to use the colors, songs and mascot of the Instituto Politécnico Nacional, without having the official support of the university. The new squad debuted in the Third Division in the 2014-15 season.

On February 29, 2016 it was announced that FC Politecnico would participate in the Liga Premier de Ascenso starting in the 2016-17 season, with the goal of reaching Liga MX in 2020. The second division team intended to play in a court north of Mexico City, however, the lack of approval by the federation led to his move to the Estadio Olímpico de Oaxtepec.

The team's management tried to develop a game system known as "atomic football" in which they tried to apply mathematical ideas in the tactics of the games.

However, on September 13, 2016, the Instituto Politécnico Nacional rejected any link with the FC Politécnico, in addition to warning the use of legal measures if the soccer team continued to use the colors, emblems, mascots and chants of the official sports teams. The team's management argued that its intention was to represent the university community and not the institution itself. Finally, in 2017, the FC Politécnico was relegated to Serie B de México, what caused the retirement of the club of that category.

FC Politécnico maintained its third division team, which returned to be the main squad in 2017. In 2018, the Instituto Politécnico Nacional began to show interest in recovering its own soccer team, so contacts between the general university directorate and the football club's board began.
