= Liga Mexicana de Football Amateur Association =

Defunct amateur association football league in Mexico

- Organising body: Amateur Association in Mexico of the Football League (Note: Defunct amateur association of football supporters in Mexico (Spanish: Asociación de Aficionados en México de la Liga de Football). It was comprised of a group of Mexican workers and British immigrants miners who introduced football to Mexico and practiced that sport as a pastime in their spare time.)
- Founded: 1902; 124 years ago
- Folded: 1922; 104 years ago
- Country: Mexico
- Number of clubs: 3–7
- Level on pyramid: 1
- Domestic cup: Copa Tower (1907–1922)
- Last champions: Pachuca AC (3rd title)
- Most championships: Reforma AC (6 titles)

Liga Mexicana de Football Amateur Association (Mexican League of Amateur Association Football), was a local amateur association football league in Mexico, near and around Mexico City, organized by the Asociación de Aficionados en México de la Liga de Football (Amateur Association in Mexico of the Football League). The league was contested between 3 and 7 participating amateur clubs, varying the number of participants in its seasons. It was held from 1902 to 1922, the Liga Mexicana was the first amateur football league and the first football competition in Mexico. In 1922, the league merged with the Liga Nacional to form the defunct Federación de Football Association, which was the first governing body for football in Mexico in the amateur era.

The league was also known as Liga Mexicana de Aficionados de Football Association (1916–1922). The competition was held in 18 editions, with the inaugural season played in 1902–03, and Orizaba AC was crowned the first champion. Seven clubs won the title, the most successful club was Reforma AC with six titles, followed by España FC with five titles, and Pachuca AC with three titles.

== History ==
Football was introduced to Mexico at the end of 19th century by immigrants miners from the United Kingdom, mostly from Cornwall. However, there was no football competition in Mexico and it was only played occasionally in British schools in Mexico City and also in mining companies with a majority of British workers such as Real del Monte y Pachuca company in the State of Hidalgo, which founded Pachuca Athletic Club in 1892 and became the first organized amateur football club established in the country.

The people who pushed football in Mexico were Percy C. Clifford and Robert J. Blackmoore, this brought the rules of the game and the first regulatory balls. Alfred Crowle also had considerable influence at the beginning of this sport in the country. In 1902, a group of football supporters created the Asociación de Aficionados en México de la Liga de Football (Amateur Association in Mexico of the Football League), which created and organized the first amateur football competition in Mexico. However, this league was completely amateur level, it was only played as pastime by football supporters and foreign immigrants workers in their spare time.

The league was inaugurated on 19 October 1902 with British Club defeating Mexico Cricket Club 5–1. The season's matches were divided into two halves of 35 minutes each due to the altitude of Mexico City. It was played locally mostly with clubs from the capital and its surrounding areas.

The five founding clubs were: British Club, Mexico Cricket Club, Orizaba AC, Pachuca AC and Reforma AC. Throughout its history, 19 clubs participated in the league although mostly clubs from Mexico City. In 1916, the league was renamed as Liga Mexicana de Aficionados (Mexican Amateur League).

The 1920–21 and 1921–22 seasons were anulled because both were played separately due to the creation of the Liga Nacional (National Amateur League), which was a separatist league created by Real Club España, after its withdrawal from the Liga Mexicana in 1919. Finally, the two leagues merged in 1922 to create the first governing body for football in Mexico, the defunct Federación de Football Association, precursor federation of the current Federación Mexicana de Fútbol.

== Participating clubs ==
Club	Period
British Club/ British FC/ British-Popo	1902–1913
Centro Deportivo Español	1915–1917, 1918–1920
CF Asturias	1919–20
CF México	1912–1918, 1919–20
Club América/ Centro Unión	1917–1920
España FC	1912–1920
España FC B	1915–1918
España Veracruz	1918–1920
Germania FV	1915–1917, 1918–1920
Junior Club/ Tigres México	1917–1920
L'Amicale Française	1914–15
México FC	1907–08
Mexico Cricket Club/ San Pedro Golf Club/ Mexico Country Club	1902–1908
Orizaba AC	1902–1904
Pachuca AC	1902–1920
Popo FC	1909–10
Puebla AC	1904–05, 1906–07
Reforma AC	1902–1915
Rovers FC	1912–1914

== See also ==
- Football in Mexico
- Campeonato de Primera Fuerza
- Liga Amateur de Veracruz
- Liga Occidental de Jalisco
