= 1927–28 Campeonato de Primera Fuerza season =

Campeonato de Primera Fuerza
- Season: 1927–28
- Champions: Club América (4th title)
- Matches: 56
- Goals: 228 (4.07 per match)
- Top goalscorer: Ernesto Sota (16 goals)

The 1927–28 season was the 6th edition of the amateur league called Campeonato de Primera Fuerza and the first edition organized by the current Federación Mexicana de Fútbol (FMF), which was established in 1927 and replacing the Federación Central de Fútbol. It had 8 participating clubs and all from Mexico City.

== Standings ==
Pos	Team	Pld	W	D	L	GF	GA	GD	Pts
1	Club América	14	11	2	1	40	19	+21	24
2	Asturias FC	14	5	8	1	44	31	+13	18
3	RC España	14	7	2	5	33	13	+20	16
4	Club México	14	6	4	4	22	22	0	16
5	CF Aurrerá	14	5	1	8	24	40	−16	11
6	Atlante FC	14	3	3	8	18	28	−10	9
7	Club Necaxa	14	2	5	7	19	30	−11	9
8	Germania FV	14	3	3	8	28	45	−17	9

Source: RSSSF

RC España withdrew at the end of the season and lost their last 4 matches by default vs Club América, Club México, Atlante FC and Club Necaxa (only points awarded, no goals).

=== Top goalscorers ===
Player	Club	Goals
(Mexico) Ernesto Sota	Club América	16
