= Iberia de Veracruz =

- Full name: Iberia de Veracruz
- Founded: 1915
- Dissolved: 1943
| Home colours | Away colours |

Iberia de Veracruz was a Mexican football club based in Veracruz, that played in the Liga Mexicana de Football Amateur Association from 1918 to 1920, and also played in the Liga Amateur de Veracruz. The club changed its name to Club España Veracruz in 1918.

== Liga Amateur de Veracruz ==
Iberia de Córdoba played in the Liga Amateur de Veracruz and became champions in the 1917–18 season. In 1918, after winning the title, the club was invited to play in the Liga Mexicana de Football Amateur Association by España FC to replace España B. Before the start of the 1918–19 season the club decided to changed its name to España Veracruz.

== Amateur league ==
=== 1918–19 ===
España Veracruz began playing in Primera Fuerza in the 1918–19 not faring well with the Mexico City teams. They ended last place in that season

Liga Mexicana de Football Amateur Association
- Season: 1918–19
- Champions: España FC (5th title)
- Matches played: 40
- Goals scored: 91 (2.28 per match)

The 1918–19 season was the 17th edition of the Liga Mexicana de Football Amateur Association. It had 7 participating clubs, after Iberia de Veracruz joined the league and changed its name to España Veracruz. España FC and Germania FV returned after their withdrawal, Junior Club changed its name to Tigres México and Club América changed its name to Club Centro Unión.

== Standings ==
| Pos | Team | Pld | W | D | L | GF | GA | GD | Pts |
|---|---|---|---|---|---|---|---|---|---|
| 1 | España FC | 12 | 10 | 1 | 1 | 42 | 1 | +41 | 21 |
| 2 | Club Centro Unión | 12 | 7 | 1 | 4 | 14 | 15 | −1 | 15 |
| 3 | Tigres México | 12 | 5 | 5 | 2 | 9 | 7 | +2 | 15 |
| 4 | Pachuca AC | 12 | 4 | 1 | 7 | 5 | 14 | −9 | 9 |
| 5 | Germania FV | 12 | 3 | 3 | 6 | 9 | 19 | −10 | 9 |
| 6 | España Veracruz | 10 | 3 | 1 | 6 | 8 | 11 | −3 | 7 |
| 7 | Deportivo Español | 10 | 1 | 2 | 7 | 4 | 24 | −20 | 4 |

Source: RSSSF

== Standings ==
| Pos | Team | Pld | W | D | L | GF | GA | GD | Pts |
|---|---|---|---|---|---|---|---|---|---|
| 1 | Pachuca AC | 5 | 3 | 2 | 0 | 7 | 2 | +5 | 8 |
| 2 | Germania FV | 5 | 2 | 3 | 0 | 8 | 4 | +4 | 7 |
| 3 | Club México | 5 | 2 | 2 | 1 | 4 | 3 | +1 | 6 |
| 4 | Asturias FC | 5 | 2 | 1 | 2 | 5 | 6 | −1 | 5 |
| 5 | Club Centro Unión | 5 | 1 | 1 | 3 | 8 | 7 | +1 | 3 |
| 6 | Deportivo Español | 5 | 0 | 1 | 4 | 1 | 11 | −10 | 1 |

Source: RSSSF

== Return to Liga Amateur de Veracruz ==
After 2 bad seasons winning only 5 games out of 28 games played, the club return to play in the Liga Sur for the 1920–21 season in Veracruz after the Primera Fuerza decides that only clubs from the capital would be allowed to participate in the league. The club returns to a league dominated by Veracruz Sporting Club, who would dominate the league in the 20s and 30s after the club had its chance to play in the Primera Fuerza in Mexico City.

Iberia de Veracruz was able to win a few more titles until the Liga Amateur de Veracruz was dissolved in 1943 in order to begin the first professional league in Mexico, Pimera Division de Mexico.

== Honours ==
=== Amateur ===
- Liga Amateur de Veracruz: 1917–18, 1923–24, 1935–36, 1938–39, 1941–42

== See also ==
- Football in Mexico
