= Nacho Trelles =

Mexican footballer and manager (1916–2020)

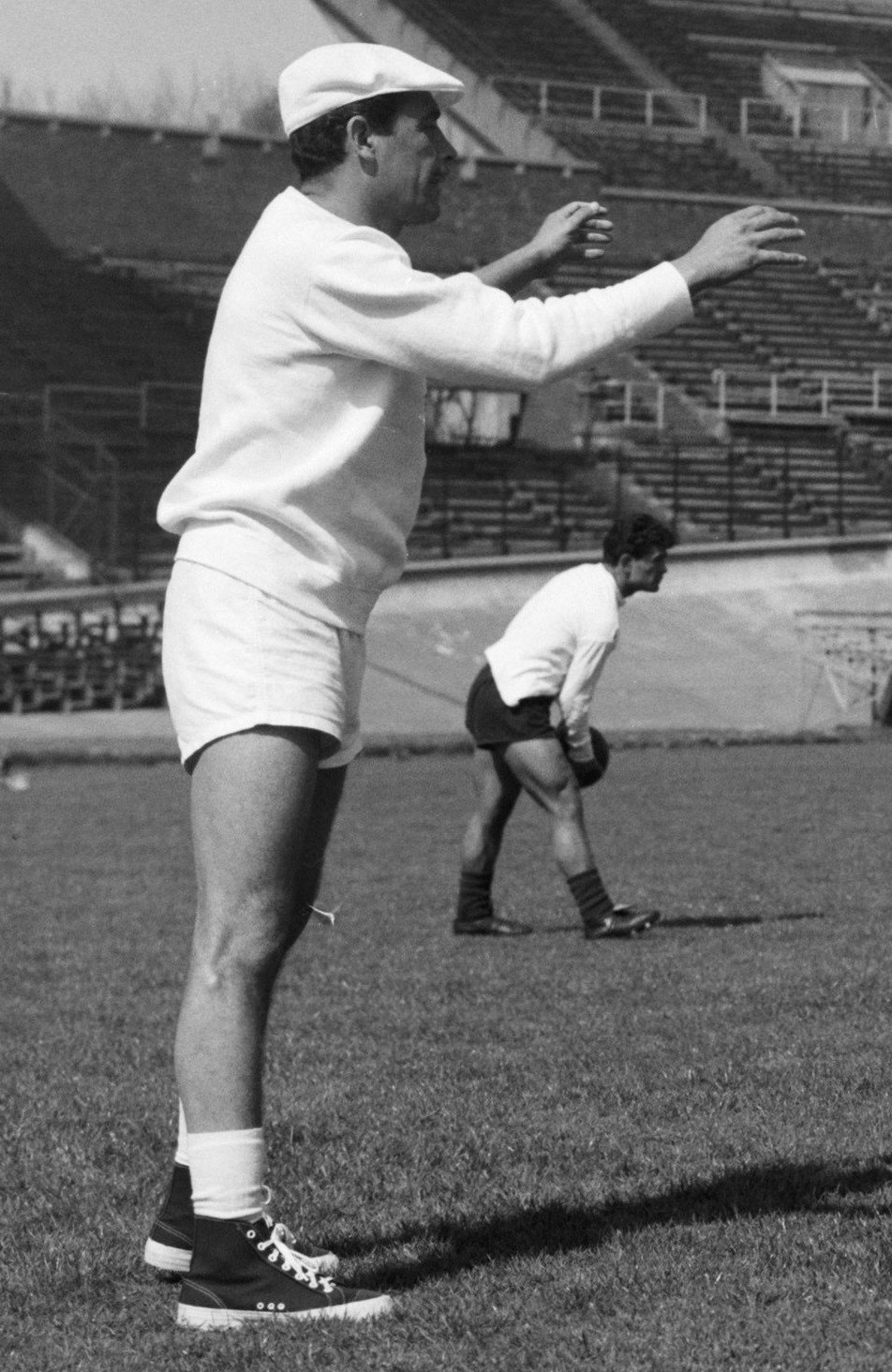
- Trelles in 1961

Personal information
- Full name: Ignacio Trelles Campos
- Date of birth: 31 July 1916
- Place of birth: Guadalajara, Mexico
- Date of death: 24 March 2020 (aged 103)
- Place of death: Mexico City, Mexico
- Position: Midfielder

Senior career*
Years	Team	Apps	(Gls)
1932–1943	Necaxa		
1943–1945	América		
1946–?	Monterrey		
1948	Chicago Vikings		
1948	Atlante		

Managerial career
- 1950–1951: Zacatepec
- 1953–1954: Club Deportivo Marte
- 1954–1958: Zacatepec
- 1957: Mexico (assistant)
- 1958–1960: América
- 1960–1969: Mexico
- 1966–1972: Toluca
- 1972–1975: Puebla
- 1975: Mexico
- 1976–1982: Cruz Azul
- 1983–1985: Atlante
- 1986–1989: UDG
- 1990–1991: Puebla
- * Club domestic league appearances and goals

Ignacio "Nacho" Trelles Campos (31 July 1916 – 24 March 2020) was a Mexican football player and manager.

Trelles was one of the dominant figures in Mexican football in the 20th century. Over a managerial career that spanned more than four decades, he coached nine clubs in the Primera División and won seven league titles, including back-to-back championships with Toluca and Cruz Azul. Trelles also served as manager of the Mexico national team at the 1962 FIFA World Cup, where the side achieved its first victory in the competition, and again at the 1966 FIFA World Cup.

Alongside Ricardo Ferretti, he is the manager with the most league titles in Mexican football. He managed 1,083 matches in Primera Division, the second-highest total of any coach in the league's history. He also holds the record for the most matches managed as coach of the national team.

== Early life ==
Trelles was born in Guadalajara. As a child, he was very athletic, engaging in many different sports. In his teenage years, Trelles's family relocated to San Miguel Chapultepec where he regularly played football in the streets.

== Club career ==
In 1934, Trelles made his debut in Mexico's Liga Mayor with Necaxa. With Los Rayos, he enjoyed a golden era, winning three league titles in the 1934–35, 1936–37, and 1937–38 seasons, as well as lifting the Copa México in 1934–35.

After his brilliant spell with Necaxa, Trelles joined Club América in 1943. Later, he was transferred to Monterrey. A true pioneer, he became one of the first Mexican footballers to try his luck in the United States. At that time, Major League Soccer did not yet exist, but small regional competitions were beginning to emerge, such as the National Soccer League in Chicago. In 1948, Trelles played for the Chicago Vikings.

His career, however, was cut short that same year due to a severe tibia and fibula injury. He retired from professional football wearing the jersey of Atlante in 1948.

== Coaching career ==
In 1950, Zacatepec gave Trelles his first big break. With the Cañeros, he began a remarkable journey, leading the team to a championship in 1951 and securing their long-awaited promotion to Mexico's top division.

His talent quickly drew attention. In the 1953–54 season, Trelles captured his first Primera División title with Marte. Though his stint with Cuautla that same year was modest, his return to Zacatepec cemented his reputation as a top-tier strategist, adding two more titles in the 1954–55 and 1957–58 campaigns.

This string of successes propelled him into the coaching staff of the Mexico national team as assistant to Antonio López Herranz, participating in the 1958 World Cup in Sweden. Soon after, Trelles took the reins of El Tri and left an indelible mark: in Chile 1962, Mexico celebrated its first-ever World Cup victory with a 3–1 triumph over Czechoslovakia. He also led the squad during the 1966 tournament in England.

At the same time, Trelles managed Club América, guiding them to two runner-up finishes in the 1961–62 and 1963–64 seasons. In 1966, he took charge of Toluca and added two more championships to his growing legacy.

His longest tenure came with Cruz Azul, where he spent seven years and won consecutive titles in 1978–79 and 1979–80, bringing his individual total to seven Primera División titles.

He managed Atlante and Leones Negros before bringing his legendary managerial career to a close with Puebla in 1991.

== Later life ==
Trelles turned 100 in July 2016. He died of a heart attack on 24 March 2020 at the age of 103, in Mexico City.

== Managerial statistics ==
As of 21 March 2026

Managerial record by team and tenure
Team	Nat.	From	To	Record								Ref
Team	Nat.	From	To	G	W	D	L	GF	GA	GD	Win %	Ref
Zacatepec	(Mexico)	1 July 1950	30 June 1951	12	8	3	1	26	15	+11	66.67	
Marte	(Mexico)	1 July 1953	30 June 1954	22	11	4	7	34	27	+7	50.00	
Zacatepec	(Mexico)	1 July 1954	30 June 1958	98	46	22	30	149	123	+26	46.94	
América	(Mexico)	1 July 1958	30 June 1960	52	25	15	12	90	67	+23	48.08	
Mexico	(Mexico)	1 June 1960	30 June 1969	79	44	20	15	150	70	+80	55.70	
Toluca	(Mexico)	1 July 1966	30 June 1972	226	105	63	58	337	224	+113	46.46	
Puebla	(Mexico)	1 July 1972	30 June 1975	108	39	36	33	154	141	+13	36.11	
Mexico	(Mexico)	1 June 1975	30 June 1976	7	4	1	2	12	5	+7	57.14	
Cruz Azul	(Mexico)	1 July 1976	30 June 1982	266	119	90	57	392	266	+126	44.74	
Atlante	(Mexico)	1 July 1982	30 June 1985	126	57	38	31	204	150	+54	45.24	
UDG	(Mexico)	1 June 1986	30 June 1989	121	47	38	36	182	154	+28	38.84	
Puebla	(Mexico)	1 June 1990	30 June 1991	42	15	11	16	44	47	−3	35.71	
Career total				1,159	520	341	298	1,774	1,289	+485	44.87	—

== Honours ==
=== Player ===
Necaxa

- Campeonato de Primera Fuerza/Liga Mayor: 1934–35, 1936–37, 1937–38
- Copa México: 1934–35

=== Manager ===
Marte

- Mexican Primera División: 1953–54

Zacatepec

- Mexican Primera División: 1954–55, 1957–58

Toluca

- Mexican Primera División: 1966–67, 1967–68
- CONCACAF Champions' Cup: 1968

Cruz Azul

- Mexican Primera División: 1978–79, 1979–80

Atlante

- CONCACAF Champions' Cup: 1983

Mexico

- CONCACAF Championship: 1965
- Pan American Games: 1967

== See also ==
- National team managers with 100 or more matches
- List of football managers with the most matches
