= 1924–25 Campeonato de Primera Fuerza season =

Campeonato de Primera Fuerza
- Season: 1924–25
- Champions: Club América (1st title)
- Matches: 42
- Goals: 97 (2.31 per match)
- Top goalscorer: Ernesto Sota (10 goals)

The 1924–25 season was the 3rd edition of the amateur league called Campeonato de Primera Fuerza. It had 7 participating clubs after Reforma AC and Son-Sin.

== Standings ==
Pos	Team	Pld	W	D	L	GF	GA	GD	Pts
1	Club América	12	10	2	0	22	4	+18	22
2	Club Necaxa	12	6	2	4	13	13	0	14
3	RC España	12	6	1	5	16	10	+6	13
4	Asturias FC	12	4	3	5	10	9	+1	11
5	CF Aurrerá	12	3	3	6	13	14	−1	9
6	Club México	12	3	3	6	10	23	−13	9
7	Germania FV	12	2	2	8	15	26	−11	6

Source: RSSSF

Two points and a score of 1-0 awarded to teams who won by default vs RC España, CF Aurrerá and Asturias FC, which withdraw on February 28, 1925.

=== Top goalscorers ===
Player	Club	Goals
(Mexico) Ernesto Sota	Club América	10
