= 1926–27 Campeonato de Primera Fuerza season =

Campeonato de Primera Fuerza
- Season: 1926–27
- Champions: Club América (3rd title)
- Matches: 42
- Goals: 155 (3.69 per match)
- Top goalscorer: Pedro Arruza; Miguel Ruiz (13 goals)

The 1926–27 season was the 5th edition of the amateur league called Campeonato de Primera Fuerza. It was the last edition organized by the Federación Central de Fútbol before the foundation of the current Federación Mexicana de Fútbol Asociación (FMF) in August 1927.

== Standings ==
Pos	Team	Pld	W	D	L	GF	GA	GD	Pts
1	Club América	12	7	4	1	28	8	+20	18
2	RC España	12	7	2	3	31	14	+17	16
3	Club Necaxa	12	7	2	3	25	9	+16	16
4	Club México	12	6	3	3	27	19	+8	15
5	CF Aurrerá	12	3	4	5	15	22	−7	10
6	Asturias FC	12	4	0	8	23	30	−7	8
7	Germania FV	12	0	1	11	6	53	−47	1

Source: RSSSF

=== Top goalscorers ===
Player	Club	Goals
(Mexico) Pedro Arruza	RC España	13
(Mexico) Miguel Ruiz	Club Necaxa	13
