= 1925–26 Campeonato de Primera Fuerza season =

Campeonato de Primera Fuerza
- Season: 1925–26
- Champions: Club América (2nd title)
- Matches: 45
- Goals: 152 (3.38 per match)
- Top goalscorer: Kurt Friederich (11 goals)

The 1925–26 season was the 4th edition of the amateur league called Campeonato de Primera Fuerza.

== Standings ==
Pos	Team	Pld	W	D	L	GF	GA	GD	Pts
1	Club América	12	8	4	0	32	9	+23	20
2	Asturias FC	12	9	2	1	22	8	+14	20
3	RC España	12	6	3	3	26	11	+15	15
4	Club Necaxa	12	5	2	5	24	15	+9	12
5	Germania FV	12	4	1	7	16	24	−8	9
6	CF Aurrerá	12	2	1	9	10	35	−25	5
7	Club México	12	1	1	10	13	41	−28	3

Source: RSSSF

The table includes four goals of a tie between Club América and RC España; this match was awarded to Club América because the players of RC España left the field during the match.

3 playoff matches were played to define the title, after the first match was annulled. The first two matches were played at Campo Asturias and the last match was played at Parque España.

- Playoff match 1: Asturias FC 1-2 Club América
- Playoff match 2: Asturias FC 4-1 Club América
- Playoff match 3: Club América 1-0 Asturias FC

=== Top goalscorers ===
Player	Club	Goals
(Switzerland) Kurt Friederich	Germania FV	11
