= 1932–33 Liga Mayor season =

Liga Mayor
- Season: 1932–33
- Champions: Club Necaxa (1st title)
- Matches: 42
- Goals: 227 (5.4 per match)
- Top goalscorer: Julio Lores (8 goals)

The 1932–33 season was the 11th edition of the amateur league called Liga Mayor. It had 10 participating clubs and were divided into two groups, the best four teams of 1931-32 season were seeded in the group A and the last four teams in the group B. RC España joined the group A, while Club México joined group B.

== Standings ==
=== Group A ===
Pos	Team	Pld	W	D	L	GF	GA	GD	Pts
1	Club Necaxa	8	5	1	2	30	18	+12	11
2	Atlante FC	8	4	1	3	22	22	0	9
3	Club América	8	3	2	3	21	21	0	8
4	RC España	8	2	3	3	20	27	−7	7
5	Asturias FC	8	1	3	4	13	18	−5	5

=== Group B ===
Pos	Team	Pld	W	D	L	GF	GA	GD	Pts
1	Club Leonés	8	4	4	0	22	14	+8	12
2	Germania FV	8	3	4	1	24	19	+5	10
3	CD Marte	8	3	3	2	19	14	+5	9
4	Club México	8	2	2	4	22	27	−5	6
5	Veracruz SC	8	1	1	6	14	27	−13	3

Source: RSSSF

The promotion-relegation playoff was played between the last team of group A and the first place of group B. The first leg was held at Parque Necaxa on August 6, 1933 and the second leg was held at Campo Asturias on August 13, 1933.

- First leg: Club Leonés 2-6 Asturias FC
- Second leg: AsturiasFC 9-3 Club Leonés

=== Top goalscorers ===
Player	Club	Goals
(Peru) Julio Lores	Club Necaxa	8
