= 1916–17 Liga Mexicana de Football Amateur Association season =

Liga Mexicana de Football Amateur Association
- Season: 1916–17
- Champions: España FC (4th title)
- Matches: 30
- Goals: 55 (1.83 per match)

The 1916–17 season was the 15th edition of the Liga Mexicana de Football Amateur Association. Rovers FC was dissolved and Junior Club withdrew, while Germania FV and the filial team España FC "B" joined the league.

== Standings ==
Pos	Team	Pld	W	D	L	GF	GA	GD	Pts
1	España FC	10	6	3	1	17	10	+7	15
2	Pachuca AC	10	6	2	2	16	8	+8	14
3	Germania FV	10	5	0	5	11	10	+1	10
4	Club México	10	4	1	5	12	12	0	9
5	Deportivo Español	10	3	1	6	10	13	−3	7
6	España FC "B"	10	2	1	7	6	19	−13	5

Source: RSSSF
