= 1915–16 Liga Mexicana de Football Amateur Association season =

Liga Mexicana de Football Amateur Association
- Season: 1915–16
- Champions: España FC (3rd title)
- Matches: 30
- Goals: 71 (2.37 per match)

The 1915–16 season was the 14th edition of the Liga Mexicana de Football Amateur Association. It had 6 participating clubs, Deportivo Español and Junior Club joined the league.

== Standings ==
Pos	Team	Pld	W	D	L	GF	GA	GD	Pts
1	España FC	10	7	2	1	27	3	+24	16
2	Pachuca AC	10	6	1	3	14	7	+7	13
3	Junior Club	10	5	2	3	13	7	+6	12
4	Rovers FC	10	5	0	5	8	13	−5	10
5	Club México	10	3	1	6	7	10	−3	7
6	Deportivo Español	10	1	0	9	2	31	−29	2

Source: RSSSF
