= 1928–29 Campeonato de Primera Fuerza season =

Campeonato de Primera Fuerza
- Season: 1928–29
- Champions: CD Marte (1st title)
- Matches: 36
- Goals: 211 (5.86 per match)
- Top goalscorer: Nicho Mejia (12 goals)

The 1928–29 season was the 7th edition of the amateur league called Campeonato de Primera Fuerza. It had 9 participating clubs and all from Mexico City.

== Standings ==
Pos	Team	Pld	W	D	L	GF	GA	GD	Pts
1	CD Marte	8	7	0	1	32	15	+17	14
2	RC España	8	6	1	1	24	11	+13	13
3	Club América	8	5	1	2	28	18	+10	11
4	Atlante FC	8	5	0	3	27	14	+13	10
5	Club Necaxa	8	5	0	3	24	24	0	10
6	Asturias FC	8	3	1	4	22	25	−3	7
7	Germania FV	8	2	0	6	24	30	−6	4
8	CF Aurrerá	8	0	2	6	16	33	−17	2
9	Club México	8	0	1	7	14	41	−27	1

Source: RSSSF

=== Top goalscorers ===
Player	Club	Goals
(Mexico) Nicho Mejia	Atlante FC	12
