= Imre Pozsonyi =

Hungarian footballer (1880–2023)

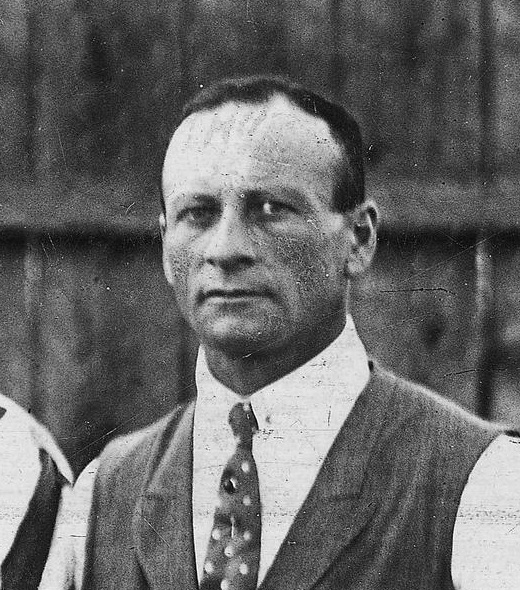
- Poszonyi in 1921

Personal information
- Date of birth: 26 February 1880
- Place of birth: Kisbér, Hungary
- Date of death: 2 October 1963 (aged 83)
- Place of death: Budapest, Hungary
- Position: Defender

Senior career*
Years	Team	Apps	(Gls)
1901–1902	MÚE	6	(1)
1903–1905	MTK	25	(0)

International career
1902	Hungary	1	(0)

Managerial career
- 1921: Poland
- 1921–1923: Cracovia
- 1924: FC Barcelona
- 1926: Građanski Zagreb
- 1926–1928: Újpest
- 1930: Real Club España
- * Club domestic league appearances and goals

Imre Pozsonyi (also known as Jesza Poszony, first name also as Emmerich and Emérico; 12 December 1880 – 2 October 1963) was a Hungarian football player and manager.

== Career ==
Pozsonyi started his career playing for MÚE and moved 1903 to MTK where he won the Hungarian Championship of Hungary. He also played for the Hungary national team in 1901 in games against Richmond (lost 4-0) and Surrey Wanderers (lost 5-1), and then Austria (lost 5-0) in 1902. Pozsonyi retired in 1903 at the age of 23, and trained as a referee.

In 1921 he became manager of the Polish club Cracovia Kraków, with which he won the first national Polish championship in that year. In 1921 he also guided the Poland national team through its first international match, which was lost 1–0 to Hungary in Budapest in December 1921.

In December 1922 he became assistant to the English manager Jack Greenwell at FC Barcelona. After Greenwell's sacking August 1923, he took over the head coach role until October, when he was replaced by the Englishman Alf Spouncer. In July 1924 he was again head coach, but he was replaced in December by the Englishman Conyers "Ralph" Kirby, under whom the team won the Spanish Cup and the Catalan championship until the end of the season.

In April 1926 he became manager of Građanski Zagreb, with which he won the Yugoslav championship of 1926. There he left in October, because he could not get his work permit renewed. After a couple of years with Ujpest FC in Budapest, where he became runner-up in cup and championship in 1927, he spent some time in the coaching staff of MTK. Early March 1930 he left for Mexico to become manager of Real Club España. He got the job there, because György Orth opted for a job in Chile instead. Pozsonyi won with the club the championship of 1930.

He was back in Budapest in 1932 on the occasion of the 30 anniversary of the first match between Hungary and Austria of which he had been a part. By then he had retired from management.

He died on 2 October 1963 in Budapest and was laid to rest at the Farkasréti Cemetery there.

== Honours ==
MTK

- Hungarian Championship: 1903

Cracovia

- Polish Championship: 1921

Građanski Zagreb

- Kingdom of Yugoslavia Championship: 1926

Real Club España

- Mexican Championship: 1929–30

== Literature ==
- Tamás Dénes, Mihály Sándor, Éva B. Bába: A magyar labdarúgás története I.: Amatorök és álamatorök (1897–1926), Campus Kiadó (Debreceni Campus Nonprofit Közhasznú Kft.), Debrecen, 2014. ISBN 978-963-9822-11-5
- Jonathan Wilson: Names Heard Long Ago: How the Golden Age of Hungarian Football Shaped the Modern Game, Blink Publishing (London, UK), 2019. ISBN 978-1-788-702-73-7
