= 1918–19 Liga Mexicana de Football Amateur Association season =

Liga Mexicana de Football Amateur Association
- Season: 1918–19
- Champions: España FC (5th title)
- Matches: 40
- Goals: 91 (2.28 per match)

The 1918–19 season was the 17th edition of the Liga Mexicana de Football Amateur Association. It had 7 participating clubs, after Iberia de Veracruz joined the league and changed its name to España Veracruz. España FC and Germania FV returned after their withdrawal, Junior Club changed its name to Tigres México and Club América changed its name to Club Centro Unión.

== Standings ==
Pos	Team	Pld	W	D	L	GF	GA	GD	Pts
1	España FC	12	10	1	1	42	1	+41	21
2	Club Centro Unión	12	7	1	4	14	15	−1	15
3	Tigres México	12	5	5	2	9	7	+2	15
4	Pachuca AC	12	4	1	7	5	14	−9	9
5	Germania FV	12	3	3	6	9	19	−10	9
6	España Veracruz	10	3	1	6	8	11	−3	7
7	Deportivo Español	10	1	2	7	4	24	−20	4

Source: RSSSF
