= 1923–24 Campeonato de Primera Fuerza season =

Campeonato de Primera Fuerza
- Season: 1923–24
- Champions: RC España (1st title)
- Matches: 73
- Goals: 163 (2.23 per match)

The 1923–24 season of Primera Fuerza was the Mexico amateur football league's second season. It was organized by the Federación Central de Fútbol (English: Central Football Federation), after the Federación Mexicana de Football Asociación changed its name in 1923.

During this season, the league had 9 participating clubs, all of them from Mexico City. CF Aurrerá and Reforma AC joined the league, Guerra y Marina changed its name to Son-Sin, while Tranvías and Luz y Fuerza merged to create a new club called Necaxa.

== Standings ==
Pos	Team	Pld	W	D	L	GF	GA	GD	Pts
1	RC España	16	9	6	1	27	6	+21	24
2	Club América	16	11	2	3	25	9	+16	24
3	Asturias FC	16	8	4	4	25	9	+16	20
4	CF Aurrerá	16	8	4	4	19	13	+6	20
5	Club Necaxa	16	6	5	5	16	17	−1	17
6	Club México	16	3	5	8	12	24	−12	11
7	Reforma AC	16	5	1	10	12	26	−14	11
8	Germania FV	16	3	3	10	12	29	−17	9
9	Son-Sin	16	2	4	10	12	27	−15	8

Source: RSSSF

A playoff match was held at Campo Asturias to define the title on July 27, 1924.

- Playoff match: RC España 2-1 Club América
