= 1921–22 Liga Mexicana de Football Amateur Association season =

Liga Mexicana/Liga Nacional
- Season: 1921–22
- Champions: (Annulled titles); Liga Mexicana: Germania FV (1st title); Liga Nacional: RC España (2nd title)

The 1921–22 season was also divided into two leagues (Liga Mexicana and Liga Nacional). As happened the previous year, the champions were annulled by the amateur organizing body. It was the last season before the leagues merged to create the first football federation (Federación Mexicana de Football Asociación) and its new league called Campeonato de Primera Fuerza.

== Standings ==
=== Liga Mexicana ===
The 4 participating clubs from Mexico City, Deportivo Internacional and Club Morelos withdrew, while Tranvías joined the league. All matches were played for 70 minutes and were played at Parque Asturias.

Club	Pld	W	D	L	Pts
Germania FV	6	5	0	1	10
Asturias FC	6	4	0	2	8
Club México	6	1	1	4	3
Tranvías	6	1	1	4	3

=== Liga Nacional ===
Only two teams participated, due to the withdrawal of Luz y Fuerza, Reforma AC and L'Amicale Française. To define the title, a single playoff match was played between RC España and Club América.

- Playoff match: RC España 2-0 Club América
