= 1931–32 Liga Mayor season =

Liga Mayor
- Season: 1931–32
- Champions: Atlante FC (1st title)
- Matches: 59
- Goals: 321 (5.44 per match)
- Top goalscorer: Juan Carreño; Julio Lores (20 goals)

The 1931–32 season was the 10th edition of the amateur league renamed as Liga Mayor (English: Major League). After the cancellation of the 1930-31 season, the FMF changed the name of the league to Liga Mayor. It had 8 participating clubs and all matches were played in Mexico City.

== Standings ==
| Pos | Team | Pld | W | D | L | GF | GA | GD | Pts |
|---|---|---|---|---|---|---|---|---|---|
| 1 | Atlante FC | 14 | 11 | 1 | 2 | 53 | 23 | +30 | 23 |
| 2 | Club Necaxa | 14 | 11 | 1 | 2 | 62 | 25 | +37 | 23 |
| 3 | Asturias FC | 14 | 9 | 2 | 3 | 40 | 34 | +6 | 20 |
| 4 | Club América | 14 | 5 | 2 | 7 | 39 | 42 | −3 | 12 |
| 5 | Germania FV | 14 | 4 | 4 | 6 | 36 | 45 | −9 | 12 |
| 6 | Veracruz SC | 14 | 4 | 2 | 8 | 29 | 34 | −5 | 10 |
| 7 | CD Marte | 14 | 2 | 3 | 9 | 30 | 57 | −27 | 7 |
| 8 | Club Leonés | 14 | 2 | 1 | 11 | 24 | 53 | −29 | 5 |

Source: RSSSF

3 Playoff matches were played to define the title, all matches were held at Parque Necaxa.

- Playoff match 1: Club Necaxa 2-3 Atlante FC
- Playoff match 2: Club Necaxa 1-1 Atlante FC
- Playoff match 3: Club Necaxa 0-1 Atlante FC

=== Top goalscorers ===
| Player | Club | Goals |
|---|---|---|
| (Mexico) Juan Carreño | Atlante FC | 20 |
| (Peru) Julio Lores | Club Necaxa | 20 |
