= 1917–18 Liga Mexicana de Football Amateur Association season =

Liga Mexicana de Football Amateur Association
- Season: 1917–18
- Champions: Pachuca AC (2nd title)
- Matches: 20
- Goals: 43 (2.15 per match)

The 1917–18 season was the 16th edition of the Liga Mexicana de Football Amateur Association. The filial team España FC "B" left the league, while España FC and Germania FV withdrew and all their matches were annulled. Club América joined the league and Junior Club returned.

== Standings ==
Pos	Team	Pld	W	D	L	GF	GA	GD	Pts
1	Pachuca AC	8	6	1	1	14	6	+8	13
2	Deportivo Español	8	3	3	2	7	6	+1	9
3	Club México	8	3	1	4	8	9	−1	7
4	Junior Club	8	3	1	4	6	8	−2	7
5	Club América	8	1	2	5	8	14	−6	4

Source: RSSSF
