= 1929–30 Campeonato de Primera Fuerza season =

Campeonato de Primera Fuerza
- Season: 1929–30
- Champions: RC España (2nd title)
- Matches: 56
- Goals: 226 (4.04 per match)
- Top goalscorer: Jorge Sota (12 goals)

The 1929–30 season was the 8th edition of the amateur league called Campeonato de Primera Fuerza.

== Standings ==
Pos	Team	Pld	W	D	L	GF	GA	GD	Pts
1	RC España	14	9	1	4	32	22	+10	19
2	Club América	14	7	4	3	34	20	+14	18
3	Club Necaxa	14	7	3	4	36	24	+12	17
4	Asturias FC	14	6	5	3	34	22	+12	17
5	Atlante FC	14	6	4	4	32	25	+7	16
6	CD Marte	14	5	4	5	22	24	−2	14
7	Club México	14	2	2	10	15	44	−29	6
8	Germania FV	14	1	3	10	21	45	−24	5

Source: RSSSF

=== Top goalscorers ===
Player	Club	Goals
(Mexico) Jorge Sota	Club América	12
