= Rovers F.C. (Mexico) =

Mexican football club

Rovers FC
- Full name: Rovers Football Club
- Nicknames: Británicos (Britons); Sajones (Saxons); Azules (Blues)
- Short name: ROV, RFC
- Founded: 1912; 114 years ago
- Dissolved: 1916; 110 years ago
- Ground: British Club; Mexico City

Rovers Football Club was a Mexican football club based in Mexico City, that played in the Liga Mexicana de Football Amateur Association from 1912 to 1916. Founded in 1912 by Percy Clifford and former members of the British Club, it was one of the British-founded clubs that played in the first decade of organised football in Mexico.

Rovers played four seasons in the Primera Fuerza, finishing as high as second in 1913–14, and won the Copa Tower in 1915–16, having been runners-up in the competition in 1912–13 and 1914–15. The club was disbanded in 1916, during the First World War, when most of its British players returned to Europe.

== History ==
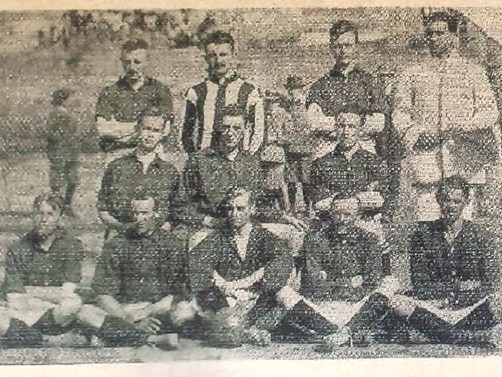
Rovers in 1916

=== Foundation ===
Rovers were founded in 1912 by Percy Clifford and former members of the British Club, the Mexico City club that Clifford himself had founded in 1901. Clifford had been one of the leading players of the early Mexican league, finishing as its top scorer while with British FC in 1904–05 and again in 1906–07. Rovers entered the Liga Mexicana de Football Amateur Association for the 1912–13 season, together with España FC, expanding the league to five clubs.

=== 1912–13 season ===
Rovers made their league debut on 6 October 1912, beating España 3–0, with goals from Mills, Harold Payne (from a penalty) and Oswald M. Sharp. They went on to finish third of five clubs, with four wins, two draws and two defeats in eight matches, scoring 15 goals and conceding seven. Their forward Robert Pryor finished as the league's top scorer, with six goals in eight games.

The season was disrupted by the Decena Trágica, the ten days of violence in Mexico City in February 1913, which caused a Rovers fixture against Pachuca AC to be postponed. In the Copa Tower, Rovers reached the final but lost 3–1 to Club México.

=== 1913–14 season ===
Rovers' best league campaign came in 1913–14, when they finished second of six clubs, with six wins, one draw and three defeats in ten matches, scoring 18 goals and conceding nine. They beat Club México 4–1, with two goals from J. Reid and one each from Pryor and Percy Clifford, won 3–1 away to L'Amicale Française, beat Pachuca 3–1, and won 2–1 away to Reforma. Pryor scored six league goals, while Harold B. Payne and A. H. Hecksher scored three each.

The season also brought frustration: Rovers were unable to complete a team for the trip to Pachuca, so their away match there was awarded to Pachuca, and in the Copa Tower they lost 1–0 after extra time to Club México in the second round on 15 February 1914, the winning goal coming from Celestino Vázquez in the sixth minute of extra time. Club México went on to win the cup, beating L'Amicale Française 2–0 in the final.

=== 1914–15 season ===
The 1914–15 league was reduced to four clubs, and Rovers finished third, with one win, one draw and four defeats in six matches. Their only win came on 29 November 1914, when they beat México FC 3–1 at the Reforma ground, with goals from Harold B. Payne, Arthur Hammond and Percy Owens, and they also drew 1–1 with Pachuca, with Payne scoring. Payne finished as the league's joint top scorer, with three goals in six games, level with Bernardo Rodríguez and Francisco Valle of España.

In the Copa Tower, Rovers reached the final, where they lost 1–0 to España.

=== 1915–16 season and Copa Tower triumph ===
Rovers' final season was 1915–16, in which they finished fourth of six clubs, with ten points from ten matches, scoring eight goals and conceding thirteen. Some results from the season are missing, so a full win–draw–loss record is not available. Among the recorded results, they held the eventual champions España to a 0–0 draw on 31 October 1915, beat Club México 1–0 on 19 December and won 1–0 away to Deportivo Español, but lost 6–0 to España.

The season's highlight came in the Copa Tower. After drawing 1–1 after extra time with Club México, Rovers won the replay 2–0, and then beat Pachuca in the final to win the trophy, the only major honour in the club's history; the score of the final is not recorded.

=== Dissolution ===
The club was disbanded in 1916, during the First World War, because most of its players were British and returned to Europe to fight. RSSSF records Rovers as dissolved after the 1915–16 season, and the club did not return.

== Copa Tower ==
The Copa Tower was the first cup competition in Mexico, organised in 1908, with its trophy donated by the British ambassador, Reginald Tower. Rovers contested the final three times: they lost 3–1 to Club México in 1912–13 and 1–0 to España in 1914–15, before winning the trophy in 1915–16 by beating Pachuca. In 1913–14 they were eliminated in the second round, losing 1–0 after extra time to Club México.

== Players and goalscorers ==
Rovers' leading league scorers included Robert Pryor, who scored six goals in eight games to finish as the league's top scorer in 1912–13, and Harold B. Payne, who scored three goals in six games to finish as joint top scorer in 1914–15.

=== Top scorers ===
- 1912–13: (England) A. Robert Pryor (6 goals in 8 games)
- 1914–15: (England) Harold B. Payne (3 goals in 6 games)

== League record ==
The club's league record, as compiled by RSSSF, was as follows:

Season	Pos	P	W	D	L	GF	GA	Pts
1912–13	3rd	8	4	2	2	15	7	10
1913–14	2nd	10	6	1	3	18	9	13
1914–15	3rd	6	1	1	4	5	7	3
1915–16	4th	10	—	—	—	8	13	10

Rovers' win–draw–loss record for 1915–16 is not given by RSSSF, which notes that some results from that season are missing.

== Honours ==
=== Amateur ===
- Copa Tower: 1915–16
  - Runners-up: 1912–13, 1914–15

== See also ==
- Football in Mexico
- Reforma Athletic Club
- Albinegros de Orizaba
- Mexico Cricket Club
- British Club
