= 1940–41 Liga Mayor season =

Liga Mayor
- Season: 1940–41
- Champions: Atlante FC (2nd title)
- Matches: 56
- Goals: 258 (4.61 per match)
- Top goalscorer: Martin Vantolra (17 goals)

The 1940–41 season was the 19th edition of the amateur league called Liga Mayor. It had 8 participating clubs, after Moctezuma de Orizaba and Selección Jalisco joined the league.

== Standings ==
Pos	Team	Pld	W	D	L	GF	GA	GD	Pts
1	Atlante FC	14	11	0	3	48	29	+19	22
2	Selección Jalisco	14	8	1	5	34	29	+5	17
3	RC España	14	8	1	5	34	30	+4	17
4	Club Necaxa	14	7	2	5	28	18	+10	16
5	Asturias FC	14	5	2	7	25	20	+5	12
6	Moctezuma de Orizaba	14	4	3	7	25	37	−12	11
7	Club América	14	4	2	8	31	37	−6	10
8	CD Marte	14	3	1	10	22	47	−25	7

Source: RSSSF

Selección Jalisco, Atlante FC and Club América awarded their matches against Asturias FC played on 15, 22 and 29 December 1940 by undue alignment of Asturias' player René Hansen.

=== Top goalscorers ===
Player	Club	Goals
(Spain) Martin Vantolra	Atlante FC	17
