= 1934–35 Liga Mayor season =

Liga Mayor
- Season: 1934–35
- Champions: Club Necaxa (2nd title)
- Matches: 45
- Goals: 253 (5.62 per match)
- Top goalscorer: Hilario López (17 goals)

The 1934–35 season was the 13th edition of the amateur league called Liga Mayor.

== Standings ==
Pos	Team	Pld	W	D	L	GF	GA	GD	Pts
1	Club Necaxa	15	13	1	1	67	24	+43	27
2	Club América	15	7	2	6	39	33	+6	16
3	Asturias FC	15	7	1	7	44	44	0	15
4	RC España	15	6	2	7	46	49	−3	14
5	Atlante FC	15	6	0	9	32	45	−13	12
6	Club México	15	1	4	10	22	55	−33	6

Source: RSSSF

=== Top goalscorers ===
Player	Club	Goals
(Mexico) Hilario "Moco" López	Club Necaxa	17
