= 1933–34 Liga Mayor season =

Liga Mayor
- Season: 1933–34
- Champions: RC España (3rd title)
- Matches: 33
- Goals: 176 (5.33 per match)
- Top goalscorer: José Pacheco (12 goals)

The 1933–34 season was the 12th edition of the amateur league called Liga Mayor. It had 6 participating clubs, all the teams of group B were dissolved (except Club México).

== Standings ==
Pos	Team	Pld	W	D	L	GF	GA	GD	Pts
1	Asturias FC	10	6	1	3	30	19	+11	13
2	RC España	10	6	1	3	27	22	+5	13
3	Atlante FC	10	6	1	3	30	32	−2	13
4	Club América	10	4	1	5	22	25	−3	9
5	Club Necaxa	10	4	0	6	34	29	+5	8
6	Club México	10	2	0	8	18	34	−16	4

Source: RSSSF

=== Playoff ===
Pos	Team	Pld	W	D	L	GF	GA	GD	Pts
1	RC España	2	2	0	0	4	2	+2	4
2	Asturias FC	2	1	0	1	6	6	0	2
3	Atlante FC	2	0	0	2	5	7	−2	0

Source: RSSSF
- Playoff match 1: Asturias FC 5-4 Atlante FC
- Playoff match 2: Atlante FC 1-2 RC España
- Playoff match 3: RC España 2-1 Asturias FC

=== Top goalscorers ===
Player	Club	Goals
(Mexico) José Pacheco	Asturias FC	12
