= Popo Park FC =

Popo FC
- Full name: Popo Park Football Club
- Nickname: The Whites-and-Blacks
- Founded: 1909; 117 years ago
- Dissolved: 1911; 115 years ago
- Ground: Campo del México Country Club Churubusco
- League: Liga Mexicana de Football Amateur Association
- 1909–10: 2nd
Home colours

Popo Park Football Club, also known as Popo FC, was an amateur football club based in Mexico City, that competed in the 1909–10 Liga Mexicana de Football Amateur Association season. The following season, the club merged with British Club and was renamed as British-Popo with all the players switching over for the 1911–12 season.

== History ==
=== League Crisis in 1909 ===
Popo Park was created from a project of ex-players from Mexico Cricket Club, Penny and J.J MacFarlane. Mexico Cricket Club was admitted into the San Pedro Golf Club in 1904 then in 1906 to the México Country Club until dissolving from the Liga de Fútbol in 1908.

In 1908-09 the league was left with three teams, Reforma, British Club y Pachuca, after México Country Club left. The crisis occurred from the limited number of people in teams. Only those team with a large number of players were able to maintain themselves. This caused the 1908–09 season to only have eight games, two for Copa Tower and Clásico England - Scotland.

=== Formation of Popo Park ===
For the 1909–10 in the crisis of folding the league, Penny y J.J. MacFarlane formed a group of random players that had performed well in English teams. They were backed by commercial group Pop Park who adopted the team and making the team the first to have a sponsor. On Sunday October 24, 1909, Popo Park FC played its first games against British Club achieving a 1–1 draw.

British Club: Colin Robertson, Churchill, Neville, John Robertson, Fitch, M.S. Turner, Ratcliffe (c), Robinson, MacNabb, Kuhn, Blueglass.

Popo Park: MacFarlane, Penny, Ell, Williams, Rees, Shorter, Harris, MacCullough, Barnes, Burgess, Griffin.

Goals by MacNabb and Burgess.

Popo Park had a good season which had them finish third, but the team was still short on players. For the following season they decided to join British Club in 1911–12. Their name was changed to British-Popo for that season and in the following season 1912-13 they once again changed their name to Rovers Football Club.

== Uniform ==
The uniform was white similar to that of Reforma, the difference was black for Popo and blue for Reforma.

During the two seasons that Popo Park participated in the league it played in México Country Club en Churubusco.

== See also ==
- Football in Mexico
