= 1912–13 Liga Mexicana de Football Amateur Association season =

Liga Mexicana de Football Amateur Association
- Season: 1912–13
- Champions: Club México (1st title)
- Matches: 20
- Goals: 55 (2.75 per match)

The 1912–13 season was the 11th edition of the Liga Mexicana de Football Amateur Association. It had 5 participating clubs, España FC and Rovers FC joined the league, while British Club was dissolved.

== Standings ==
Pos	Team	Pld	W	D	L	GF	GA	GD	Pts
1	Club México	8	5	1	2	14	10	+4	11
2	Pachuca AC	8	4	2	2	13	6	+7	10
3	Rovers FC	8	4	2	2	15	7	+8	10
4	Reforma AC	8	2	2	4	6	15	−9	6
5	España FC	8	1	1	6	7	17	−10	3

Source: RSSSF
