= 1919–20 Liga Mexicana de Football Amateur Association season =

Liga Mexicana de Football Amateur Association
- Season: 1919–20
- Champions: Pachuca AC (3rd title)
- Matches: 15
- Goals: 33 (2.2 per match)

The 1919–20 season was the 18th edition of the Liga Mexicana de Football Amateur Association. The season started with 9 teams with the return of Club México, Asturias FC joined the league. However, Tigres México were expelled for not showing up in their last 3 matches and all their matches were annulled. While España FC and España Veracruz withdrew. It was the last season before the separation of the league (Liga Mexicana and Liga Nacional).

== Standings ==
| Pos | Team | Pld | W | D | L | GF | GA | GD | Pts |
|---|---|---|---|---|---|---|---|---|---|
| 1 | Pachuca AC | 5 | 3 | 2 | 0 | 7 | 2 | +5 | 8 |
| 2 | Germania FV | 5 | 2 | 3 | 0 | 8 | 4 | +4 | 7 |
| 3 | Club México | 5 | 2 | 2 | 1 | 4 | 3 | +1 | 6 |
| 4 | Asturias FC | 5 | 2 | 1 | 2 | 5 | 6 | −1 | 5 |
| 5 | Club Centro Unión | 5 | 1 | 1 | 3 | 8 | 7 | +1 | 3 |
| 6 | Deportivo Español | 5 | 0 | 1 | 4 | 1 | 11 | −10 | 1 |

Source: RSSSF
