= 1914–15 Liga Mexicana de Football Amateur Association season =

Liga Mexicana de Football Amateur Association
- Season: 1914–15
- Champions: España FC (2nd title)
- Matches: 12
- Goals: 25 (2.08 per match)

The 1914–15 season was the 13th edition of the Liga Mexicana de Football Amateur Association. Only 4 teams participated, due to the dissolution of Reforma AC and L'Amicale Française.

== Standings ==
| Pos | Team | Pld | W | D | L | GF | GA | GD | Pts |
|---|---|---|---|---|---|---|---|---|---|
| 1 | España FC | 6 | 5 | 1 | 0 | 8 | 1 | +7 | 11 |
| 2 | Pachuca AC | 6 | 3 | 2 | 1 | 8 | 4 | +4 | 8 |
| 3 | Rovers FC | 6 | 1 | 1 | 4 | 5 | 7 | −2 | 3 |
| 4 | Club México | 6 | 1 | 0 | 5 | 2 | 11 | −9 | 2 |

Source: RSSSF
