= 1913–14 Liga Mexicana de Football Amateur Association season =

Liga Mexicana de Football Amateur Association
- Season: 1913–14
- Champions: España FC (1st title)
- Matches: 30
- Goals: 67 (2.23 per match)

The 1913–14 season was the 12th edition of the Liga Mexicana de Football Amateur Association. It had 6 participating clubs, after L'Amicale Française joined the league.

== Standings ==
| Pos | Team | Pld | W | D | L | GF | GA | GD | Pts |
|---|---|---|---|---|---|---|---|---|---|
| 1 | España FC | 10 | 7 | 2 | 1 | 13 | 6 | +7 | 16 |
| 2 | Rovers FC | 10 | 6 | 1 | 3 | 18 | 9 | +9 | 13 |
| 3 | Club México | 10 | 4 | 1 | 5 | 12 | 12 | 0 | 9 |
| 4 | Reforma AC | 10 | 3 | 2 | 5 | 9 | 14 | −5 | 8 |
| 5 | Pachuca AC | 10 | 3 | 2 | 5 | 6 | 10 | −4 | 8 |
| 6 | L'Amicale Française | 10 | 1 | 4 | 5 | 9 | 16 | −7 | 6 |

Source: RSSSF
