= Club Leonés =

Mexican football club

- Full name: Club Leonés de Obras Públicas
- Founded: 1915
- Dissolved: 1933

Club Leonés de Obras Públicas, simply known as Club Leonés, was a Mexican football club based in Mexico City, that played in the amateur era of the Liga Mayor from 1931 to 1933.

== 1931–32 ==
During this season, as Basque teams such as Aurrerá and Real Club España, the league decided to invite two teams in order to complete the eight teams for the season. The teams that were invited were Veracruz Sporting and Club Leonés.

Since these teams were new they did not fare well in the season. Club Leonés attempted to play veteran players from other teams such as Nieves Hernández, Miguel "Venada" Alatorre y Lage, combined with a few rookies who later became professionals such as "Chueco" Arteaga.

That season Leonés won two games, while drawing one, losing 11.

== 1932–33 ==
With the league expanding the number of team to 10, the teams were divided into two groups of five with Leonés was placed in group B. Leonés were going as first place in their group on the game of the season with Germania one point behind. The game started quickly for Germania taking the 3–0 lead until Leonés tied it up in the first half. In the second half Leonés went up 4–3 and then Germania tied it up towards to end to finish the match 4–4.

Leonés ended up playing the lowest placed team in the group, Asturias, to determine which team would be relegated. The playoff was a two-leg game with Asturias winning both games with an aggregate 15–5. The games were played on August 6 and 13 with scores of 6–2 and 9–3 respectively.

In the second game, Asturias' center forward Pepe Pacheco scored 6 goals, a record that stood until Isidro Lángara scored 7 goals in 1946.

After the season, all teams except México FC were dissolved. Mexico FC was accepted by the league because it was the older from the team in group B and it required six teams for the following season.

== Player Records ==
=== Top scorers ===
| Rank | Player | Goals | Season |
|---|---|---|---|
| 1 | Honorio Arteaga | 8 | 1932–33 |
