= 1920–21 Liga Mexicana de Football Amateur Association season =

Liga Mexicana/Liga Nacional
- Season: 1920–21
- Champions: (Annulled titles); Liga Mexicana: Asturias FC (1st title); Liga Nacional: RC España (1st title)

The 1920–21 season was divided into two leagues, Liga Mexicana (English: Mexican League) and Liga Nacional (English: National League). After the expulsion of Tigres México from the league, España FC and España Veracruz withdrew in solidarity. España FC changed its name to Real Club España and decided to form their own league called Liga Nacional. Due to the separation of the leagues, the champions were annulled by the amateur organizing body, which was the Asociación de Aficionados de México en la Liga de Football (English: The Mexico Amateur Association in the Football League).

== Standings ==
=== Liga Mexicana ===
The 5 participating clubs from Mexico City, and all the matches were played at Parque Asturias. Pachuca AC and Deportivo Español were dissolved. In replacement Deportivo Internacional and Club Morelos joined the league.

| Club | Pld | W | D | L | Pts |
|---|---|---|---|---|---|
| Asturias FC | 8 | 5 | 2 | 1 | 12 |
| Deportivo Internacional | 7 | 3 | 3 | 1 | 9 |
| Club Morelos | 7 | 2 | 2 | 3 | 6 |
| Germania FV | 7 | 1 | 3 | 3 | 5 |
| Club México | 7 | 1 | 2 | 4 | 4 |

=== Liga Nacional ===
The 5 participating teams from Mexico City, and all the matches were played at Parque España. Reforma AC, Club América, Luz y Fuerza and L'Amicale Française joined the Liga Nacional.

| Club | Pld | W | D | L | Pts |
|---|---|---|---|---|---|
| RC España | 8 | 6 | 2 | 0 | 14 |
| Club América | 8 | 4 | 3 | 1 | 11 |
| L'Amicale Française | 8 | 3 | 1 | 4 | 7 |
| Luz y Fuerza | 8 | 2 | 0 | 6 | 4 |
| Reforma AC | 8 | 1 | 2 | 5 | 4 |
