= Conyers Kirby =

English footballer and manager

Personal information
- Date of birth: 18 March 1884
- Place of birth: Birmingham, England
- Date of death: 9 April 1946 (aged 62)
- Position: Outside right

Senior career*
| Years | Team | Apps | (Gls) |
- Royal Army Medical Corps
| 1905–1906 | Fulham | 4 | (0) |
| 1906–1907 | Birmingham | 1 | (0) |
| 1907–190? | Blackpool | 0 | (0) |
| – | Worcester City | | |
| 1908–1911 | Kidderminster Harriers | | |
| 1911–1913 | Willenhall Pickwick | | |
| 1913–191? | Fulham | 0 | (0) |

Managerial career
- 1922–1924: CE Europa
- 1924–1925: FC Barcelona
- 1925–1926: Athletic Bilbao
- * Club domestic league appearances and goals

Conyers Kirby (18 March 1884 – 9 April 1946), also known as Ralph Kirby, was an English professional footballer who played in the Football League for Birmingham. He played as an outside right.

== Playing career ==
Kirby was born in the Bordesley Green district of Birmingham. While serving in the Royal Army Medical Corps, he represented them at football and became a champion sprinter. In 1905 he joined Southern League club Fulham, for whom he played four league games. In the 1906 close season he joined Birmingham, for whom he made his only Football League appearance, on 6 September 1906 in the First Division match at home to Newcastle United which Birmingham lost 4–2. He later joined Blackpool, without appearing in the Football League, and played non-league football for Worcester City, Kidderminster Harriers and Willenhall Pickwick, before returning to Fulham in 1913.

== Coaching career ==
Kirby retired from playing in 1918 and moved to Spain, where he became a referee and a football manager. He coached both CE Europa and FC Barcelona during the 1920s. He was appointed Europa manager in August 1922. In 1923 he guided Europa to the Campionat de Catalunya. After finishing level on points with Barcelona, Europa beat them 1–0 in a title play-off. They then represented Catalonia in the Copa del Rey and after defeating Sevilla and Sporting Gijón in earlier rounds, they lost 1–0 to Athletic Bilbao in the final at Les Corts.

Kirby was subsequently appointed coach of Barcelona in December 1924, replacing Jesza Poszony. His first game in charge was a 2–0 win in a friendly against First Vienna on Christmas Day 1925. He remained in charge for 39 games.

He joined Athletic Bilbao in September 1925, and returned to England in May 1926.

== Honours ==
CE Europa

- Copa del Rey runners-up: 1923
- Campionat de Catalunya: 1922–23

FC Barcelona

- Copa del Rey: 1925
- Campionat de Catalunya: 1925

Athletic Bilbao

- Basque football championship: 1925-26
