= Mexican Football Federation =

Governing body of association football in Mexico

Coordinates: 19.41779°N 99.169887°W

CONCACAF
- Short name: FMF
- Founded: 23 August 1927; 99 years ago
- Headquarters: Toluca, State of Mexico
- FIFA affiliation: 1929
- CONCACAF affiliation: 1961
- President: Mikel Arriola
- Website: fmf.mx

The Mexican Football Federation (Spanish: Federación Mexicana de Fútbol Asociación, A.C.), also known by its acronym FMF, is the official governing body responsible for organizing, supervising, developing and promoting all competitive football in Mexico. The federation was officially established on 23 August 1927 to replace the Federación Central de Fútbol, and its headquarters are located in Toluca, State of Mexico. It is a full member of FIFA since 1929, and is a founding member of CONCACAF and NAFU since 1961.

The FMF administers the men's and women's national teams in all their categories, the national teams of futsal and beach soccer, all the men's and women's professional leagues in the Mexican football league system, all official domestic competitions, all competitions for youth and reserve teams, and the affiliated amateur sectors.

== History ==
The first governing body for football in Mexico was founded in 1922 as Federación de Football Association, after the merger of Liga Mexicana and Liga Nacional, two precursor amateur leagues. Inmediately, the federation created the Campeonato de Primera Fuerza (First Force Championship), although it was a local amateur league in Mexico City, it is considered as the direct predecessor of the current Liga MX. However, the Federación de Football Association was dissolved in 1923 and replaced by the Federación Central de Fútbol (Central Football Federation), due to the great influence and relevance of the clubs from Mexico City.

In 1927, the current Federación Mexicana de Fútbol Asociación was officially established, after a reorganization and renewal led by the seven founding clubs: América, Asturias, Aurrerá, Club México, Germania, Necaxa and Real Club España. The president Humberto Garza Ramos, the general secretary Juan B. Orraca and the treasurer Manuel Alonso registered and affiliated the FMF with FIFA in 1929. Since the 1927–28 season, the FMF took control of organizing the Campeonato de Primera Fuerza.

On November 1930, the Juegos de la Revolución (Games of the Revolution) an event to celebrate the 20th anniversary of the Mexican Revolution was held in the country, and the FMF paused the 1930–31 season. While the event was taking place, the clubs that played their home matches at Campo Asturias requested permission to remodel it. However, Real Club España, América, and Necaxa, clubs that had their own fields, disagreed with the FMF's permission, and this generated disagreements and conflicts. On December 1930, there was a total separation of clubs in the FMF, dividing into two groups. A group of five clubs with Atlante, Asturias, Club México, Germania and Marte remained affiliated with the FMF, and also invited Club Leonés and Sporting to join the league. Meanwhile, the separatist group with Real Club España, América and Necaxa invited Club Alvarado and Toluca to join the Federación Central de Fútbol, which sought to overthrow the FMF, but failed due to a lack of support from FIFA.

Due to the separation of the clubs, the FMF cancelled the 1930–31 season. After several months and economic losses for both federations, they reached agreements on 7 July 1931 for the reintegration of all clubs with the FMF, and thus the Federación Central was dissolved. Subsequently, the FMF renamed the league competition as Liga Mayor del Distrito Federal (Mayor League of the Federal District), which was played until the beginning of the professional era of the league, officially established in 1943 as Liga Mayor.

== Structure ==
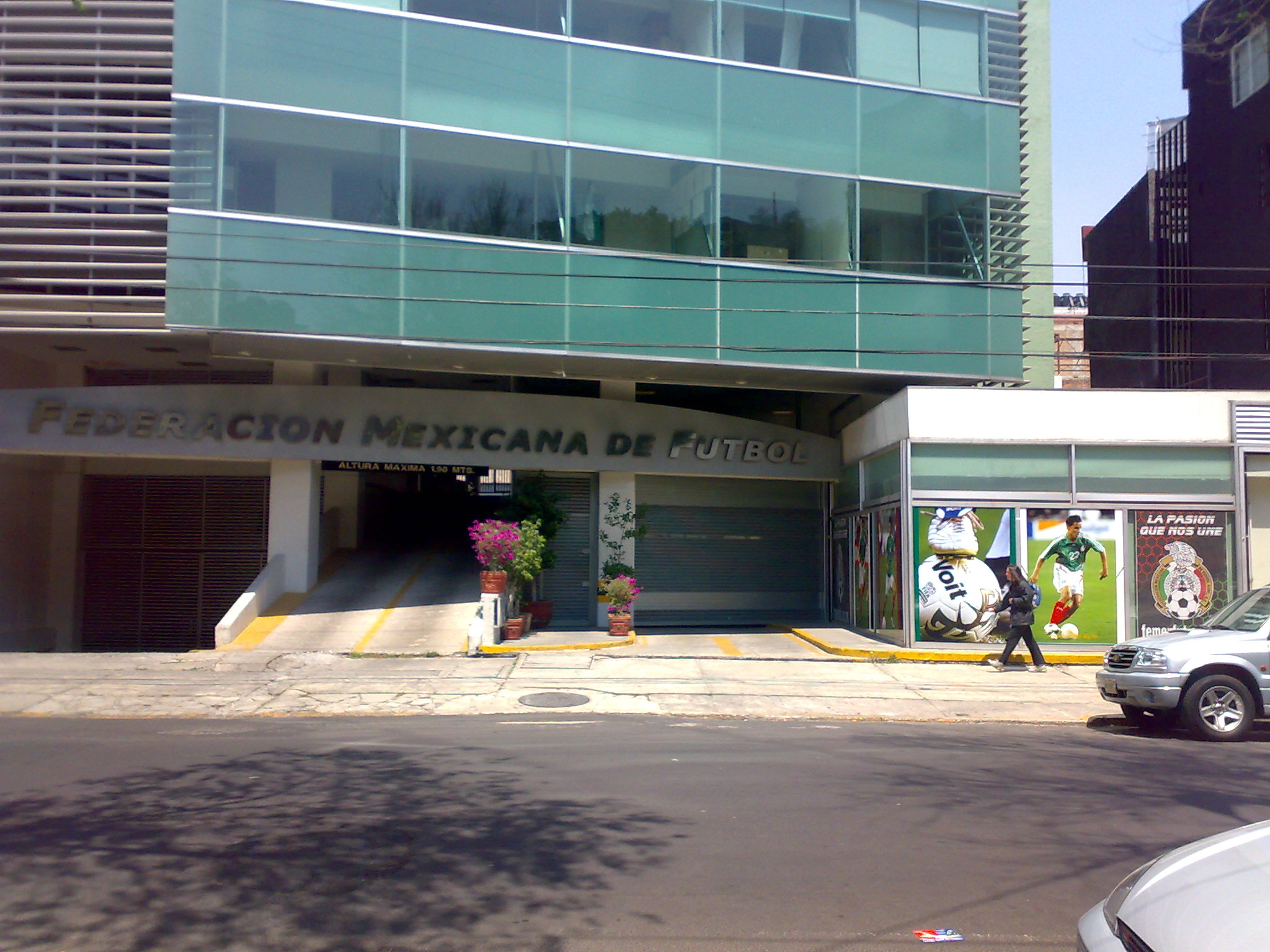
Former headquarters in Mexico City

The governing body of the Federation is the General Assembly that conforms with the participation of the Liga MX with 40% of the votes; Liga Femenil with 18%; Liga de Expansión MX with 5%; Liga Premier with 18%; Liga TDP with 13%, and the Amateur Sector with 6%. The executive and administrative body is the National Council, which comprises five members, one from each of the divisions mentioned, and are elected every four years.

=== Association staff ===
| Name | Position | Source |
|---|---|---|
| (Mexico) Mikel Arriola | President Commissioner | |
| (Mexico) Ivar Sisniega | Executive President | |
| (Mexico) Lorena Mac Farland | Chief of Staff | |
| (Mexico) Iñigo Riestra | Chief Legal Officer | |
| (Mexico) Luis Palma | Chief Operations Officer | |
| (Mexico) Leonardo Valdez | Director of Human Capital | |
| (Mexico) Luis Cantú | Director of IT | |
| (Mexico) Lucía Mijares | Technical Director | |
| (Mexico) José Romano | Sales Manager | |
| (Mexico) Duilio Davino | Sports Director of National Teams (men's) | |
| (Mexico) Andrea Rodebaugh | Sports Director of National Team (women's) | |
| (Mexico) Víctor Manuel Aguado | Director of Institutional Services | |
| (Argentina) Andrés Lillini | Coordinator of Youth National Teams | |
| (Mexico) Jorge Christian Tello | Scouting Coordinator | |
| (Spain) Martí Matabosch | Sports Science Coordinator | |
| (Mexico) Rafael Márquez | Head coach (men's) | |
| (Spain) Pedro López | Head coach (women's) | |
| (Mexico) Isidro Chávez Castillo | Director of Communications and Public Relations | |
| (Mexico) Fernando Schwartz | Director of Strategic Communications | |
| (Mexico) Salvador Aguilera Galicia | Press Officer | |
| (Mexico) Juan Manuel Herrero | Director of the Referees Committee | |
| (Chile) Enrique Osses | Technical Director of the Referees Department | |
| (Mexico) Benito Armando Archundia | Director of Referee Delegations and Mentoring | |

Source: FMF

== National teams ==
=== Mexico national team ===
The first Mexico national team was established in 1923, defeating Guatemala 2–1 at home in Mexico City, and the Mexico's debut in international competitions was at the 1928 Olympic Games. Mexico has qualified for the FIFA World Cup eighteen times, its first appearance was in the inaugural edition in Uruguay 1930, and also played the opening match against France. The team's best performance was reaching the quarter-finals twice (1970 and 1986), both as hosts.

The team won its first honors in international competitions at the Central American and Caribbean Games, winning the gold medal in 1935 and 1938. In competitions organized by a FIFA-affiliated body, the team won the NAFC Championship in 1947 and 1949. Mexico was a founding member of CONCACAF in 1961, after the merger of NAFC and CCCF. In 1963, the team participated in the inaugural edition of the CONCACAF Championship, and won its first title in 1965.

Mexico is the only non-European or South American national team to have won a global or intercontinental FIFA competition for senior national teams, winning the 1999 FIFA Confederations Cup as hosts, defeating Brazil 4–3. The Mexico national team has won 21 titles in total: one FIFA Confederations Cup, 13 CONCACAF Championship/Gold Cup titles, one CONCACAF Nations League, one CONCACAF Cup, two NAFC Championship titles, one North American Nations Cup and two gold medals at the Central American and Caribbean Games.

=== Mexico women's national team ===
The first women's national team was originally established in 1963, the team played its first match in 1970, defeating Austria 9–0 in Italy. Mexico's debut in international women's competitions was in the 1991 CONCACAF Women's Championship. Mexico has qualified for the FIFA Women's World Cup three times, and the team's first appearance was in 1999.

The Mexico women's national team has won five titles in total: four gold medals at the Central American and Caribbean Games and one gold medal at the Pan American Games.

=== Mexico Under-23 team / Olympic team ===
The Under-23 team, also known as the Olympic team, is an intermediate category between the senior team and the youth teams. Implemented by FIFA since 1992 to participate in the Olympic football tournament to replace amateur teams.

The Under-23 team has qualified for the Olympic Games six times. The team have been Olympic medalists twice, winning the gold medal at the 2012 Olympic Games, defeating 2–1 Brazil, and also won the bronze medal at the 2020 Olympic Games, defeating the hosts Japan 3–1.

=== Men's youth teams ===
The Under-20 team has qualified for the FIFA U-20 World Cup eighteen times, finishing as runners-up in 1977, and also finishing as third place in 2011. The team has won the CONCACAF Under-20 Championship fifteen times.

The Under-17 team has qualified for the FIFA U-17 World Cup seventeen times, finishing as world champions twice (2005 and 2011), and also finishing as runners-up twice (2013 and 2019). The team won the CONCACAF Under-17 Championship nine times.

The Under-15 team participated in the inaugural edition of the FIFA U-15 World Cup & Festival in 2026, finishing as ninth place out of 189 participating teams. The team has won the CONCACAF Boys' Under-15 Championship twice.

=== Women's youth teams ===
The women's Under-20 team has qualified for the FIFA U-20 Women's World Cup eleven times, the team's best performance was reaching the quarter-finals four times (2010, 2012, 2016 and 2022). The team has won the CONCACAF Women's U-20 Championship twice.

The women's Under-17 team has qualified for the FIFA U-17 Women's World Cup nine times, finishing as runners-up in 2018 and also finishing as third place in 2025. The team won the CONCACAF Women's U-17 Championship once.

The women's Under-15 team has only participated in the CONCACAF Girls' Under-15 Championship, finishing as runners-up twice.

== Professional leagues ==
Men's football is organized into four professional leagues. Women's football is organized into two professional leagues.

| Level | League | Teams | Editions | Current champions |
Men
| 1 | Liga MX | 18 | 115 | Cruz Azul |
| 2 | Liga de Expansión MX | 16 | 12 | Tepatitlán |
| 3 | Liga Premier | 48 | 101 | Deportiva Venados |
| 4 | Liga TDP | 246 | 67 | Delfines de Coatzacoalcos |
Women
| 1 | Liga Femenil | 18 | 18 | América |
| 2 | Liga TDP Femenil | 52 | 2 | Atlético Cuernavaca |

== Competitions ==
=== Current competitions ===
| Type | Competition | Note | Founded |
Men's competitions
| Interfederation | Leagues Cup (Note: Tournament organized jointly by MLS and Liga MX, and also officially recognized by FMF and USSF. Since 2023, it is also officially recognized by CONCACAF.) | Cup tournament | 2019 |
| Interfederation | Campeones Cup (Note: Competition organized jointly by MLS and Liga MX, and also officially recognized by FMF and USSF.) | Super cup | 2018 |
| Top level | Liga MX | League | 1943 |
| Top level | Campeón de Campeones | Super cup | 1943 |
| Top level | Supercopa de la Liga MX (Note: The trophy is only contested when a club wins both Liga MX tournaments of the season and also automatically wins the Campeón de Campeones.) | Super cup | 2022 |
| Second level | Liga de Expansión MX | League | 2020 |
| Second level | Campeón de Campeones de la Liga de Expansión MX | Super cup | 2021 |
| Third level | Liga Premier (Note: From 1950 to 1994, it was the second level league of Mexican football.) | League | 1950 |
| Third level | Primera Premier | Subdivisions of Liga Premier | 2026 |
| Third level | Premier A | Subdivisions of Liga Premier | 2008 |
| Third level | Premier B | Subdivisions of Liga Premier | 2008 |
| Third and Fourth level | Copa Conecta | Cup tournament | 2021 |
| Fourth level | Liga TDP (Note: From 1967 to 1994, it was the third level league of Mexican football.) | League | 1967 |
| Reserve | Torneo Talento Premier Filiales (Note: Tournament played by "filiales", teams affiliated with a club in a higher level league.) | Liga Premier reserve tournament | — |
| Reserve | Torneo de Filiales Liga TDP | Liga TDP reserve tournament | — |
| Academy | Copa Promesas MX (Note: Since the 2026–27 season, tournament played by Under-21 teams of Liga MX, Liga Premier and Liga TDP clubs.) | U-21 cup tournament | 2024 |
| Academy | Liga MX Sub-21 | Youth leagues | 2025 |
| Academy | Liga MX Sub-19 | Youth leagues | 2024 |
| Academy | Liga MX Sub-17 | Youth leagues | 2009 |
| Academy | Liga MX Sub-15 | Youth leagues | 2010 |
| Academy | Liga MX Sub-14 | Youth leagues | 2022 |
| Academy | Liga MX Sub-17 Internacional | U-17 international cup | 2022 |
| Amateur | Sector Amateur FMF | Amateur tournaments and leagues | — |
Women's competitions
| Top level | Liga Femenil | League | 2017 |
| Top level | Campeón de Campeonas | Super cup | 2021 |
| Second level | Liga TDP Femenil | League | 2024 |
| Academy | Liga Femenil Sub-19 | Youth league | 2022 |

=== Discontinued competitions ===
| Type | Competition | Note | Period |
Men's competitions
| Interfederation | North American SuperLiga (Note: Tournament organized jointly by FMF and USSF, and approved by CONCACAF.) | Cup tournament | 2007–2010 |
| Top level | Copa MX | Cup tournament | 1942–1976, 1987–1992, 1994–1997, 2012–2020 |
| Top level | Supercopa MX | Super cup | 2014–2019 |
| Second level | Ascenso MX | League | 1994–2020 |
| Second level | Campeón de Ascenso | Super cup | 1997–2019 |
| Third level | Copa México de la Segunda División/ Copa de la Liga Premier de Ascenso (Note: Between 1950 and 1972 it was a second level competition.) | Cup tournament | 1950–1972, 1995–96, 2013–2015 |
| Third level | Campeón de Campeones de la Segunda División/Liga Premier (Note: Between 1952 and 1972, it was a second level competition.) | Super cup | 1952–1972, 1995–2018, 2021–2023, 2025 |
| Third level | Copa de Campeones de la Liga Premier de Ascenso | Super cup | 2014 |
| Third level | Copa de la Liga de Nuevos Talentos | Cup tournament | 2013–2015 |
| Third level | Campeón de Campeones de la Liga de Nuevos Talentos/Serie B | Super cup | 2008–2018, 2021–2023, 2025 |
| Third level | Copa de Campeones de la Liga de Nuevos Talentos | Super cup | 2014–2015 |
| Fourth level | Copa México de la Tercera División | Cup tournament | 1968–1976, 1980–81 |
| Fourth level | Campeón de Campeones de la Tercera División | Super cup | 1969–1973, 1975 |
| Academy | Liga MX Sub-23 | Youth leagues | 2025 |
| Academy | Liga MX Sub-20 | Youth leagues | 2009–2023 |
| Academy | Liga MX Sub-18 | Youth leagues | 2021–2024 |
| Academy | Liga MX Sub-16 | Youth leagues | 2021–2024 |
| Academy | Liga MX Sub-13 | Youth leagues | 2012–2019 |
| Academy | Liga MX Sub-15 Internacional | Liga MX youth international cup | 2014–2019 |
| Qualifiers | Pre-Libertadores | Qualifying tournaments for Copa Libertadores | 1998–2003 |
| Qualifiers | InterLiga (Note: Tournament organized jointly by the company Soccer United Marketing and FMF.) | Qualifying tournaments for Copa Libertadores | 2004–2010 |
| Amateur | Campeonato de Primera Fuerza/ Liga Mayor del Distrito Federal (Note: Since the 1927–28 season, the league was organized by the FMF.) | Mexico City's local league | 1922–1943 |
| Amateur | Copa México | Amateur era | 1932–1942 |
| Amateur | Campeón de Campeones | Amateur era | 1942 |
| Unofficial | Copa Presidencial Adolfo López Mateos (Note: Tournament played by Primera División clubs.) | Extra and unofficial cup tournaments | 1963 |
| Unofficial | Torneo de Nuevos Valores (Note: Tournament played by Primera División clubs with six starting players and five reserve players.) | Extra and unofficial cup tournaments | 1978 |
| Unofficial | Copa Federación (Note: Tournament organized jointly by FMF and the company "Pronósticos Deportivos", it was played by Primera and Segunda División clubs.) | Extra and unofficial cup tournaments | 1983 |
| Unofficial | Copa Federación-Prode (Note: Tournament organized jointly by FMF and the company "Pronósticos Deportivos", it was played by Segunda División clubs.) | Extra and unofficial cup tournaments | 1984 |
Women's competitions
| Top level | Copa MX Femenil | Cup tournament | 2017 |

== Criticism ==
=== Multi-team ownership issue ===
The issue of multi-team ownership has been a highly debated one within the owners of the professional football clubs and the FMF. Of 34 clubs in the top two tiers, about a fourth of the clubs are owned by four groups: Grupo Pachuca (Pachuca and León), Grupo Caliente (Tijuana and Dorados de Sinaloa), Grupo Omnilife (Guadalajara and Tapatío) and Cooperativa La Cruz Azul (Cruz Azul and Cruz Azul Hidalgo). Of those groups that own more than one team, that ownership is usually split between the top two tiers of the league and act as a form of player development.

In May 2013, the Liga MX club owners approved banning a person or company from owning more than one team. The issue came to fore when rumor was that Carlos Slim, whose telecommunications company América Móvil owns a 30% stake in Grupo Pachuca, sought to acquire Guadalajara; he would refute the speculation. The ban applied to future acquisitions, not the then current team ownership, and did not require the sale of teams in excess of the one team limitation.

The issue reemerged in November 2013 when TV Azteca, owner of Monarcas Morelia, paid out 124 shareholders of Club Atlas US$50 million to acquire the club, which for years had been struggling financially.

== 2026 World Cup Bid ==
In September 2012, former Federación President Justino Compeán confirmed plans to bid. On 4 March 2016, Federación President Decio De Maria announced continued interest after the new FIFA president Gianni Infantino was elected in the wake of the Garcia Report corruption scandal. In April 2017, the Federación, with Canada and the United States, announced a joint bid to host the World Cup. It was awarded on 13 June 2018; 134 votes versus the Morocco bid by the Royal Moroccan Football Federation with 65 votes. Mexico will host 10 matches, Canada 3 matches, and the United States 60 matches in 10 cities including the final. The shortlist of match cities was selected in June 2022: Guadalajara, Mexico City, & Monterrey.

== Presidents ==
Official federation

Federación Mexicana de Fútbol Asociación
| Period | President |
|---|---|
| 1927–1928 | Humberto Garza Ramos |
| 1928–1929 | Enrique Gavaldá |
| 1930–1933 | Jesús Salgado |
| 1933–1937 | Germán Núñez Cortina |
| 1937–1941 | Carlos Garcés |
| 1941–1943 | Manuel Galán |
| 1943–1945 | Enrique Chávez Peón |
| 1945–1947 | Sebastián Martínez |
| 1948 | Ernesto Casillas |
| 1949–1950 | José Luis Canal |
| 1950–1952 | José Luis Barros Sierra |
| 1952–1954 | Pedro Pons |
| 1954–1956 | Salvador Guarneros |
| 1956–1958 | Ignacio Gómez Urquiza |
| 1958–1960 | Moisés Estrada |
| 1960–1970 | Guillermo Cañedo de la Bárcena |
| 1970–1974 | José Luis Pérez Noriega |
| 1974 | Alfonso Estrada |
| 1974 | Carlos Laviada |
| 1974–1978 | Juan de Dios de la Torre |
| 1978–1980 | Guillermo Aguilar Álvarez Mazarrasa |
| 1980–1988 | Rafael del Castillo |
| 1988 | Rafael Castellanos |
| 1988–1989 | Marcelino García Paniagua |
| 1989–1990 | Jesús Reynoso |
| 1990–1993 | Francisco Ibarra García de Quevedo |
| 1993–1994 | Marcelino García Paniagua |
| 1994–1998 | Juan José Leaño |
| 1998 | Raúl Borja Navarrete |
| 1998–2000 | Enrique Borja |
| 2000–2006 | Alberto de la Torre Bouvet |
| 2006–2015 | Justino Compeán Palacios |
| 2015–2018 | Decio de María Serrano |
| 2018–2023 | Yon de Luisa Plazas |
| 2023–2024 | Juan Carlos Rodríguez Bas |
| 2024–present | Mikel Arriola |

Unofficial and defunct federation

Federación de Football Association
| Period | President |
|---|---|
| 1922–1923 | Ulises García Ramos |

== See also ==
- Football in Mexico
- Women's football in Mexico
- Mexican football league system
- Mexico national football team
- Mexico women's national football team
- List of football clubs in Mexico
- List of Mexican football champions
- List of football clubs in Mexico by major honours won
- Mexican football clubs in international competitions
