= Club Morelos =

Mexican football club

- Full name: Club Morelos
- Founded: 1920
- Dissolved: 1922
- Ground: San Pedro de los Pinos

Club Morelos was a Mexican football club based in Mexico City, that played in the 1920–21 season of the Liga Mexicana.

== History ==
The club was founded in 1920 under the direction of Margarito Cejudo, a football enthusiast of Morelos. The team had a very short stint that only lasted from 1920 to 1922. Some of the players that were in the team were the founders of Club México. They played in San Pedro de los Pinos, then a small suburb of Mexico City.

== See also ==
Football in Mexico
