= 1937–38 Liga Mayor season =

Liga Mayor
- Season: 1937–38
- Champions: Club Necaxa (4th title)
- Matches: 30
- Goals: 147 (4.9 per match)
- Top goalscorer: Efraín Ruiz (13 goals)

The 1937–38 season was the 16th edition of the amateur league called Liga Mayor.

== Standings ==
Pos	Team	Pld	W	D	L	GF	GA	GD	Pts
1	Club Necaxa	10	7	1	2	30	13	+17	15
2	Asturias FC	10	7	0	3	31	14	+17	14
3	CD Marte	10	5	0	5	26	33	−7	10
4	RC España	10	3	1	6	27	27	0	7
5	Club América	10	3	1	6	15	28	−13	7
6	Atlante FC	10	3	1	6	18	32	−14	7

Source: RSSSF

=== Top goalscorers ===
Player	Club	Goals
(Mexico) Efraín Ruiz	Asturias FC	13
