= 1903–04 Liga Mexicana de Football Amateur Association season =

Liga Mexicana de Football Amateur Association
- Season: 1903–04
- Champions: Mexico Cricket Club (1st title)
- Matches: 16
- Goals: 33 (2.06 per match)

The 1903–04 season was the 2nd edition of the Liga Mexicana de Football Amateur Association. The same 5 teams from the previous year participated.

== Standings ==
Pos	Team	Pld	W	D	L	GF	GA	GD	Pts
1	Mexico Cricket Club	8	7	0	1	13	1	+12	14
2	Reforma AC	7	5	1	1	15	3	+12	11
3	British Club	5	1	1	3	1	4	−3	3
4	Orizaba AC	6	1	1	4	2	11	−9	3
5	Pachuca AC	6	0	1	5	2	14	−12	1

Source: RSSSF
