= 1935–36 Liga Mayor season =

Liga Mayor
- Season: 1935–36
- Champions: RC España (4th title)
- Matches: 20
- Goals: 90 (4.5 per match)
- Top goalscorer: Hilario López (14 goals)

The 1935–36 season was the 14th edition of the amateur league called Liga Mayor.

== Standings ==
Pos	Team	Pld	W	D	L	GF	GA	GD	Pts
1	RC España	8	5	2	1	18	16	+2	12
2	Club América	8	4	1	3	20	16	+4	9
3	Club Necaxa	8	2	3	3	17	17	0	7
4	Asturias FC	8	2	3	3	14	16	−2	7
5	Atlante FC	8	1	3	4	20	24	−4	5

Source: RSSSF

=== Top goalscorers ===
Player	Club	Goals
(Mexico) Hilario López	Club Necaxa	14
