= 1939–40 Liga Mayor season =

Liga Mayor
- Season: 1939–40
- Champions: RC España (5th title)
- Matches: 44
- Goals: 199 (4.52 per match)
- Top goalscorer: Alberto Mendoza (15 goals)

The 1939–40 season was the 18th edition of the amateur league called Liga Mayor.

== Standings ==
Pos	Team	Pld	W	D	L	GF	GA	GD	Pts
1	Real España	15	10	2	3	46	31	+15	22
2	Club Necaxa	15	8	1	6	32	28	+4	17
3	Atlante FC	15	7	2	6	34	37	−3	16
4	Club América	14	4	4	6	33	33	0	12
5	Asturias FC	14	5	2	7	29	29	0	12
6	CD Marte	15	2	5	8	25	41	−16	9

Source: RSSSF

The result of the match (Club América 4-3 Asturias FC) was annulled by the FMF.

=== Top goalscorers ===
Player	Club	Goals
(Mexico) Alberto Mendoza	Atlante FC	15
