= 1902–03 Liga Mexicana de Football Amateur Association season =

Liga Mexicana de Football Amateur Association
- Season: 1902–03
- Champions: Orizaba AC (1st title)
- Matches: 10
- Goals: 26 (2.6 per match)

The 1902–03 season was the inaugural edition of the Liga Mexicana de Football Amateur Association (English: Mexican Amateur Association Football League), the first amateur football league in Mexico. Formed on July 19, 1902 and the first match was held on October 19. It was organized by the Asociación de Aficionados de México en la Liga de Football (English: The Mexico Amateur Association in the Football League), with 5 participating teams that played each other once in a round-robin format.

== Results ==
The games that were going to be played in Mexico City would be played in the grounds of Reforma and Mexico Cricket Club, while Orizaba AC and Pachuca AC would play their respective games in their own grounds.

Date	Club	Result	Club
Oct 19, 1902	Mexico Cricket Club	1-5	British Club
Nov 1, 1902	Pachuca AC	3-3	Reforma AC
Nov 30, 1902	Mexico Cricket Club	0-5	Reforma AC
Dec 7, 1902	British Club	2-0	Pachuca AC
Dec 14, 1902	Orizaba AC	1-0	British Club
Dec 20, 1902	Pachuca AC	0-0	Mexico Cricket Club
Dec 28, 1902	Reforma AC	1-0	British Club
Jan 1, 1903	Orizaba AC	1-0	Pachuca AC
Jan 11, 1903	Orizaba AC	2-2	Reforma AC
Feb 1, 1903	Orizaba AC	wbd^{1}	Mexico Cricket Club

1. Win by default, the victory was awarded to Orizaba AC, due to the Mexico Cricket Club failed to complete 11 players.

== Standings ==
Pos	Team	Pld	W	D	L	GF	GA	GD	Pts
1	Orizaba AC	4	3	1	0	4	2	+2	7
2	Reforma AC	4	2	2	0	11	5	+6	6
3	British Club	4	2	0	2	7	3	+4	4
4	Pachuca AC	4	0	2	2	3	6	−3	2
5	Mexico Cricket Club	4	0	1	3	1	10	−9	1

Source: RSSSF
