= Campeonato de Primera Fuerza =

Campeonato de Primera Fuerza / Liga Mayor del Distrito Federal
- Organising body: Federación de Football Association (1922–23); Federación Central de Fútbol (1923–1927); Mexican Football Federation (1927–1943)
- Founded: 1922; 104 years ago as Campeonato de Primera Fuerza; 1931; 95 years ago as Liga Mayor del Distrito Federal
- Folded: 1943; 83 years ago
- Country: Mexico
- Number of clubs: 18
- Level on pyramid: 1
- Domestic cup(s): Copa México (1932–1942)
- Last champions: Marte (2nd title)
- Most championships: Real Club España (6 titles)

Campeonato de Primera Fuerza, later known as Liga Mayor del Distrito Federal, was a local amateur association football league in Mexico created in 1922 by the defunct Federación de Football Association, the first governing body for amateur football in Mexico. The league was based in Mexico City, formerly known as the Federal District (Spanish: Distrito Federal). From 1923 to 1927, the league was organized by the defunct Federación Central de Fútbol. Since the 1927–28 season, the league was organized by the Mexican Football Federation, which was officially established in 1927 and thus also took control of the competition.

The league was held in 20 editions, the inaugural season was played in 1922–23 with eight participating clubs and Asturias crowned as the first champions.

It is the only local league from the amateur era of Mexican football that is considered the direct predecessor of the current Liga MX. The league had a total of 18 participating clubs throughout its history, the first matches outside of Mexico City were played in the 1940–41 season with the incorporation of Moctezuma and Selección Jalisco.

Six clubs were champions at least once. Real Club España was the most successful club with six titles, América and Necaxa with four titles each, Asturias, Atlante and Marte with two titles each.

== History ==
Prior to the Liga MX (at that time named Liga Mayor), there was no true national football league in Mexico and all football competitions were held within relatively small geographical regions. The winners of the Liga Mexicana de Football Amateur Association, a local league consisting of teams in and around Mexico City, was the first amateur football league played in Mexico from 1902 to 1922. There were other regional leagues such as the Liga Amateur de Veracruz, Liga Occidental De Jalisco and Liga del Bajío that also had notable clubs. Many club owners were not keen on the idea of establishing a professional league, despite paying players under the table. With the increasing demand for football, there was a sense of urgency to unite all the local amateur leagues in Mexico to progress as a football nation. The first professional national league was officially established in 1943.

The people who pushed football in Mexico were Percy C. Clifford and Robert J. Blackmoore. This brought the rules of play and the first regulatory balls. English Alfred Crowle, who played for Pachuca since 1908, also had considerable influence on the sport. In 1910, Club México is founded, the first team formed by Alfredo B. Cuellar headed Mexican, Jorge Alberto Gomez de Parada and Sierra, then promoted by other foreign colonies: L'Amicale Française in 1911, Rovers FC and Real Club España in 1912, Centro Deportivo Español in 1914, Germania FV in 1915, Catalonia in 1917, Asturias FC in 1918, and CF Aurrerá in 1919.

Club América (at that time called Centro Unión), founded on the union of two Marist College in 1916, was the first important team composed of Mexicans in the capital city and achieved to win four consecutive championships between 1924 and 1928. In 1918, Sinaloa was founded and changed several times its name, first to Lusitania in 1919, then to U-53 in 1920, then to Atlántico in 1921 but due to the colloquial use of that word it was derived to Atlante, whose components were proletarian extraction; their leaders were the Trinidad and Refugio Martinez brothers. While between 1918 and 1920 the teams Cuenta y Administración, Guerra y Marina y Son-Sin resulted in the Club Esparta, which was then rebranded as CD Marte, brilliant team that never became popular, and even in the professional era and would move to Cuernavaca.

Regularly attended clubs outside Mexico City as Pachuca AC, Puebla AC, Veracruz SC, Iberia de Córdoba, Moctezuma de Orizaba, Orizaba AC, Tigres México, España Veracruz, these being the most successful of them, Pachuca was crowned in seasons 1904–05, 1917–18 and 1919–20. In 1920 there was a split in the Mexican amateur league, shortly before the start of the season. Real España and España Veracruz in solidarity with the expulsion of Tigres México, withdrew from the league and founded its own league named Liga Nacional. As this idea went nowhere, Orizaba scheduled a series of friendly matches to remain active, with so many rivals like España Veracruz who was defeated 9–0 on 20 October 1919, or their wins 4–0 and 2–0 against Tigres México, 2–0 on the Río Blanco and the achievements of Copa Alfonso XIII in a three-game series against Reforma and the Copa Elche in two games against Asturias. The power and influence of the Hispanic teams was such that the press of the time chose to cover their sports facilities to those meetings. Spain interference on means, suitable to be published little news about the Liga Mexicana.

The 1920–21 season was played separately with the creation of the Liga Nacional founded by Real Club España and later joined América, Luz y Fuerza, L'Amicale Française and Reforma. Meanwhile, the Liga Mexicana had the participation of Asturias, Deportivo Internacional, Club México, Club Morelos and Germania. Only two seasons were played before both leagues merged to form the first Mexican football federation.

On August 1922, was founded the first football federation in Mexico, the unofficial Federación Mexicana de Football Asociación and later renamed as Federación Central de Fútbol. They immediately created the Campeonato de Primera Fuerza on 28 August 1922. It was considered the first direct antecedent of the current Liga MX. The members of the new league promoted the creation of the first national team, which would dispute its first match in 1923.

The 1930–31 season was suspended after two days, when Asturias, Atlante, Germania, Club Mexico and Marte requested permission to remodel Campo Asturias (not to be confused with the Parque Asturias, built until 1936) which was in poor condition, to make their home games there; to the disagreement of Real España, Necaxa (both who owned their own parks) and América. This coupled with the conflict arose with the Real Federación Española de Fútbol, which had asked the FMF to disable Gaspar Rubio who had signed for Real España. It got to the point of suspension of the three clubs who unsuccessfully tried to make a parallel tournament and the Federation decided to suspend the season to definitively resolve administrative problems. After months of conflict, smoothed asperities and the competition was renamed as Liga Mayor, to organize two competitions: the Campeonato Preferente consisted of six clubs, and the Primera Ordinaria, that served as a promotion division. This competition had durability and grew to cluster up to 16 club.

Club Necaxa, founded by members of Compañía de Luz y Fuerza del Centro, was an unforgettable dynasty in the decade 1930–40 known as the "11 brothers"; the first team to win promotion, won four league titles and the Copa México twice, becoming the first "Campeonísimo" in Mexico. Among the ranks of the "11 brothers" also arises a top Mexican football legends: Horacio Casarín.

In the 1931–32 season, Veracruz SC were invited and also played the following season, although all their matches were played in Mexico City. In the 1938–39 season, CD Euzkadi was included when it was formed because the Basque Country national football team was refused permission by FIFA to play with affiliated teams. In 1937, during the Spanish Civil War, the first Basque President José Antonio Aguirre, had decided to send a Basque football club abroad in order to raise funds for the civil war that was taking place in Spain. When their homeland was captured by their enemies the players dared not return home. The Basques, under the name Club Deportivo Euzkadi, were allowed into the league and developed a fierce rivalry with traditional all Hispanic teams (Real España and Asturias) and despite winning 13 of the 17 games played, they came out of the tournament as runners-up to Asturias. At the end of the season, the team disbanded and the players became part of the Liga Mayor teams or other leagues.

The 1940–41 season was the first with matches played outside of Mexico City, after Selección Jalisco and Moctezuma de Orizaba joined the league. Selección Jalisco formed by elements of Guadalajara, Atlas, Nacional, y Oro. This team had played a series of friendly matches between 1926 and 1930 as part of promotional tours by Liga Occidental de Jalisco.

== Liga Mexicana de Football Amateur Association ==
Liga Mexicana de Football Amateur Association was an amateur association football league in Mexico founded and organized by the Asociación de Aficionados de México en la Liga de Football (English: The Mexico Amateur Association in the Football League), formed by football fans and company workers in 1902. The league merged with the Liga Nacional in 1921.

The league was held 18 editions. The inaugural edition was the 1902–03 season, with Orizaba crowned as the first champions. The final edition was the 1920–21 season, with Germania crowned as the last champions.

It was entirely an amateur league, as it was only played by football fans and foreign immigrant workers in their spare time. It had a total of 22 participating clubs throughout its history, although mostly clubs from Mexico City. The five founding clubs of the league were: British Club, Mexico Cricket Club, Orizaba, Pachuca and Reforma.

Seven clubs won the title at least once. Reforma was the most successful club with six titles, España with five titles and Pachuca with three titles.

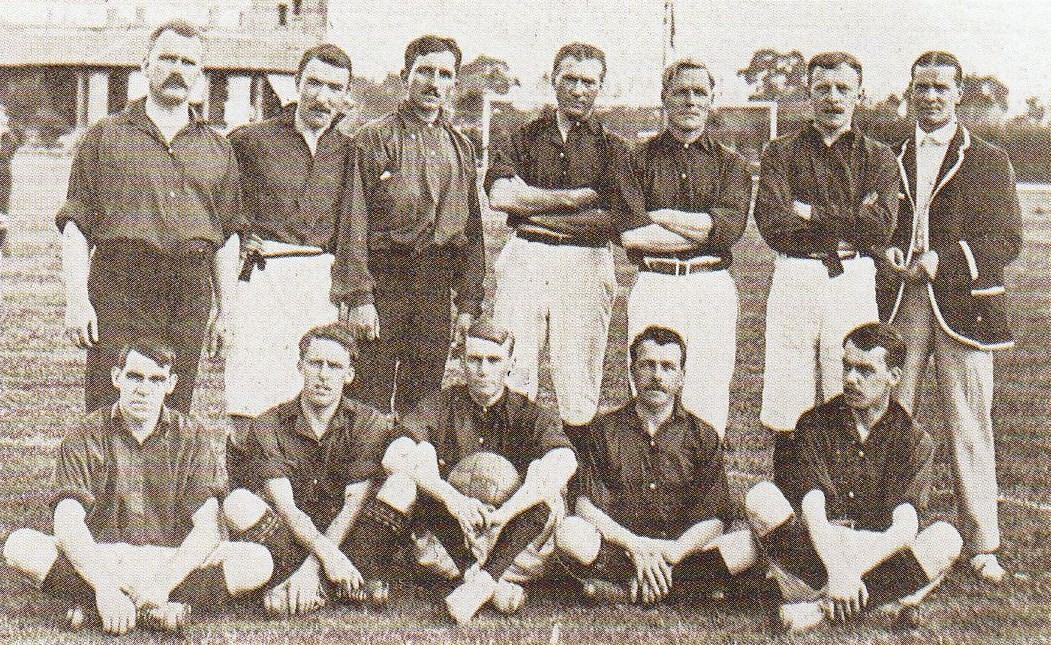
British Club in 1903.

Participating clubs
Club	Years participating
América/Centro Unión^{1}	1917–1920
Asturias	1919–1922
British Club/British FC/British-Popo^{2}	1902–1913
México	1912–1918, 1919–1922
Club Morelos	1920–21
Deportivo Español	1915–1917, 1918–1920
Deportivo Internacional	1920–21
España Veracruz^{3}	1918–1920
Germania	1915–1917, 1918–1922
Iberia de Córdoba	1921–22
L'Amicale Française	1914–15
Mexico Cricket Club/San Pedro Golf Club/Mexico Country Club^{4}	1902–1908
México FC	1907–08
Orizaba	1902–1904
Pachuca^{5}	1902–1920
Popo	1909–10
Puebla^{6}	1904–05, 1906–07
España	1912–1920
España "B"	1915–1918
Reforma	1902–1915
Rovers	1912–1914
Junior Club/Tigres México^{7}	1917–1920

Notes

1. Club América changed its name to Club Centro Unión (1918–1920), between 1920 and 1922 participated in the Liga Nacional.
2. British Club changed its name to British FC (1909–10 and 1911–12 seasons) and then British-Popo (1910–11 season).
3. Iberia de Veracruz joined the league in the 1918–19 season, and changed its name to España Veracruz.
4. Mexico Cricket Club changed its name to San Pedro Golf Club (1904–05 season) and then Mexico Country Club (1905–1907).
5. The current Club de Fútbol Pachuca founded in 1892 as Pachuca Football Club and changed its name to Pachuca Athletic Club in 1895.
6. Founded in 1892 as Puebla Football Club and changed its name to Puebla Athletic Club in 1894. It has no relation with Club Puebla, which was founded in 1944.
7. Junior Club changed its name to Tigres México in 1918.

Results
Ed.	Year	Champions	Result	Runners-up	Manager
1	1902–03	Orizaba	Round-robin	Reforma	(Scotland) Duncan Macomish
2	1903–04	Mexico Cricket Club	Round-robin	Reforma	(France) Claude M. Butlin
3	1904–05	Pachuca	Round-robin	British Club	(England) Charles Grenfell
4	1905–06	Reforma AC	Round-robin	Mexico Country Club	(England) Thomas R. Phillips
5	1906–07	Reforma	Round-robin	British Club	(England) Thomas R. Phillips
6	1907–08	British Club	Round-robin	México FC	(England) Percy Clifford
7	1908–09	Reforma	Round-robin	Pachuca	(England) Thomas R. Phillips
8	1909–10	Reforma	Round-robin	Popo	(England) Thomas R. Phillips
9	1910–11	Reforma	Round-robin	Pachuca	(England) Thomas R. Phillips
10	1911–12	Reforma	3–0	Pachuca	(England) Thomas R. Phillips
11	1912–13	México	Round-robin	Pachuca	(Mexico) Antonio Sierra
12	1913–14	España	Round-robin	Rovers	(Spain) Francisco G. Ubierta
13	1914–15	España	Round-robin	Pachuca	(Spain) Francisco G. Ubierta
14	1915–16	España	Round-robin	Pachuca	(Spain) Francisco Arias
15	1916–17	España	Round-robin	Pachuca	(Spain) Francisco G. Ubierta
16	1917–18	Pachuca	Round-robin	Deportivo Español	(England) William Penguely
17	1918–19	España	Round-robin	Centro Unión	(Spain) Francisco Arias
18	1919–20	Pachuca	Round-robin	Germania	(England) Alfred C. Crowle
—	1920–21^{1}	Asturias	Round-robin	Deportivo Internacional	(Scotland) Gerald Brown
—	1921–22^{1}	Germania	Round-robin	Asturias	(Germany) Richard Obert

Notes

1. Annulled seasons due to the separation of the league into Liga Mexicana and Liga Nacional.

Performances
Rank	Club	Titles	Runners-up	Winning years
1	Reforma	6	2	1905–06, 1906–07, 1908–09, 1909–10, 1910–11, 1911–12
2	España	5	0	1913–14, 1914–15, 1915–16, 1916–17, 1918–19
3	Pachuca	3	7	1904–05, 1917–18, 1919–20
4	British Club	1	2	1907–08
4	Mexico Cricket Club/Mexico Country Club	1	1	1903–04
4	Orizaba	1	0	1902–03
4	México	1	0	1912–13
8	México FC	0	1	—
8	Popo	0	1	—
8	Rovers	0	1	—
8	Deportivo Español	0	1	—
8	América/Centro Unión	0	1	—
8	Germania	0	1	—

== Liga Nacional ==
Liga Nacional was an amateur association football league in México founded and organized by Real Club España as a separatist league played in parallel, after its withdrawal from the Liga Mexicana.

Prior to the merger of the two leagues in 1921, only two season were held (1920–21 and 1921–22), both won by Real España.

The first season had five participating clubs: América, L'Amicale Française, Luz y Fuerza, Real España and Reforma. The second season only two clubs participated (Real España and América), and they only played a playoff match to define the title.

Results
Ed.	Year	Champions	Result	Runners-up
1	1920–21	Real España	Round-robin	América
2	1921–22	Real España	2–0	América

Performances
Rank	Club	Titles	Runners-up	Winning years
1	Real España	2	0	1920–21, 1921–22
2	América	0	2	—

== Participating clubs ==
Club	Years participating
América	1922–1943
Asturias	1922–1943
Atlante	1927–1943
Aurrerá	1923–1929
Euzkadi^{1}	1938–39
Leonés	1931–1933
México	1922–1930, 1932–1934
Germania	1922–1933
Luz y Fuerza^{2}	1922–23
Guerra y Marina/Son-Sin^{3}	1922–1924
Marte	1928–1932, 1937–1943
Moctezuma	1940–1943
Necaxa	1923–1943
Real España	1922–1930, 1932–1943
Reforma	1923–24
Selección Jalisco	1940–1943
Tranvías^{2}	1922–23
Veracruz Sporting	1931–1933

Notes

1. Euzkadi was formed due to the FIFA's ban on the Basque Country national football team from playing with affiliated teams after the Spanish Civil War.
2. Luz y Fuerza and Tranvías were merged in 1923 and created Necaxa.
3. Founded by the Marines in Mexico under the name Guerra y Marina and the following season changed its name to Son-Sin.

== Results ==
- 1922–23: Organized by the Federación Mexicana de Football Asociación.
- 1923–1927: Organized by the Federación Central de Fútbol.
- 1927–1943: Organized by the current Federación Mexicana de Fútbol (FMF).

Ed.	Year	Champions	Result	Runners-up	Manager
Campeonato de Primera Fuerza
1	1922–23	Asturias	Round-robin	Germania	(Scotland) Gerald Brown
2	1923–24	Real España	2–1	América	(Spain) Francisco Arias
3	1924–25	América	Round-robin	Necaxa	(Mexico) Rafael Garza Gutiérrez
4	1925–26	América	1–0	Asturias	(Mexico) Rafael Garza Gutiérrez
5	1926–27	América	Round-robin	Real España	(England) Percy Clifford
6	1927–28	América	Round-robin	Asturias	(England) Percy Clifford
7	1928–29	Marte	Round-robin	Real España	(Mexico) Servando Vargas
8	1929–30	Real España	Round-robin	América	(Hungary) Emérico Pozsonyi
—	1930–31	The season was canceled			
Liga Mayor
9	1931–32	Atlante	1–0	Necaxa	(Spain) Miguel Tovar Mariscal
10	1932–33	Necaxa	Round-robin	Atlante	(Austria) Ernesto Pauler
11	1933–34	Real España	2–1	Asturias	(Hungary) Jesza Poszony
12	1934–35	Necaxa	Round-robin	América	(Austria) Ernesto Pauler
13	1935–36	Real España	Round-robin	América	(Hungary) Jesza Poszony
14	1936–37	Necaxa	Round-robin	Atlante	(Austria) Ernesto Pauler
15	1937–38	Necaxa	Round-robin	Asturias	(Austria) Ernesto Pauler
16	1938–39	Asturias	Round-robin	Euzkadi	(Spain) José Ramón Ballina
17	1939–40	Real España	Round-robin	Necaxa	(Spain) Ramón Torralba
18	1940–41	Atlante	Round-robin	Selección Jalisco	(Hungary) Luis Grocz
19	1941–42	Real España	5–4	Atlante	(Spain) Nemesio Tamayo
20	1942–43	Marte	Round-robin	Atlante	(Argentina) José Gómez

== Performances ==
Rank	Club	Titles	Runners-up	Winning years
1	Real España	6	2	1923–24, 1929–30, 1933–34, 1935–36, 1939–40, 1941–42
2	América	4	4	1924–25, 1925–26, 1926–27, 1927–28
2	Necaxa	4	3	1932–33, 1934–35, 1936–37, 1937–38
4	Asturias	2	4	1922–23, 1938–39
4	Atlante	2	4	1931–32, 1940–41
4	Marte	2	0	1928–29, 1942–43
7	Germania	0	1	—
7	Euzkadi	0	1	—
7	Selección Jalisco	0	1	—

== Copa Tower ==
Copa Tower was an amateur association football competition in Mexico and a domestic cup tournament of the Liga Mexicana de Football Amateur Association. It was named in honor of fact that the trophy was donated by Reginald Tower, the British ambassador to Mexico.

The tournament was held 15 editions. The inaugural edition was the 1907–08 Copa Tower, with Pachuca crowned as the first champions. The final edition was the 1921–22 Copa Tower, with Asturias crowned as the last champions.

Eight clubs won the title at least once. España was the most successful club with four titles, México with three titles, Pachuca and Reforma with two titles each.

Results
Ed.	Year	Champions	Result	Runners-up
1	1907–08	Pachuca	1–0	British Club
2	1908–09	Reforma	2–1	Pachuca
3	1909–10	Reforma	—	Pachuca
4	1910–11	British-Popo	3–0	Reforma
5	1911–12	Pachuca	w/o	Reforma
6	1912–13	México	3–1	Rovers
7	1913–14	México	2–1 (a.e.t.)	L'Amicale Française
8	1914–15	España	1–0	Rovers
9	1915–16	Rovers	—	Pachuca
10	1916–17	España	5–1	México
11	1917–18	España	1–0	Tigres México
12	1918–19	España	4–0	México
13	1919–20	América	1–0	Asturias
14	1920–21	México	1–0	Deportivo Internacional
15	1921–22	Asturias	2–0	Germania

Performances
Rank	Club	Titles	Runners-up	Winning years
1	España	4	0	1914–15, 1916–17, 1917–18, 1918–19
2	México	3	2	1912–13, 1913–14, 1920–21
3	Pachuca	2	3	1907–08, 1911–12
3	Reforma	2	2	1908–09, 1909–10
5	Rovers	1	2	1915–16
5	British Club/British-Popo	1	1	1910–11
5	Asturias	1	1	1921–22
5	América	1	0	1919–20
9	L'Amicale Française	0	1	—
9	Tigres México	0	1	—
9	Deportivo Internacional	0	1	—
9	Germania	0	1	—

== Copa Eliminatoria ==
Copa Eliminatoria was an amateur association football competition in Mexico and a domestic cup tournament of the Liga Nacional.

The tournament was held seven editions. The inaugural edition was the 1920–21 Copa Eliminatoria and the final edition was the 1927–28 Copa Eliminatoria, both won by Real España.

Three clubs won the title at least once. Real España was the most successful club with three titles, Asturias and Necaxa with two titles each.

Results
Ed.	Year	Champions	Result	Runners-up
1	1920–21	Real España	2–1	Luz y Fuerza
2	1921–22	Real España	3–1	Luz y Fuerza
3	1922–23	Asturias	2–1 (a.e.t.)	Germania
4	1923–24	Asturias	3–0	Real España
5	1924–25	Necaxa	1–0 (a.e.t.)	América
6	1925–26	Necaxa	3–2 (a.e.t.)	Asturias
—	1926–27	The competition was not held		
7	1927–28	Real España	3–1	Asturias

Performances
Rank	Club	Titles	Runners-up	Winning years
1	Real España	3	1	1920–21, 1921–22, 1927–28
2	Asturias	2	2	1922–23, 1923–24
2	Necaxa	2	0	1924–25, 1925–26
4	Luz y Fuerza	0	2	—
4	Germania	0	1	—
4	América	0	1	—

== Statistics ==
=== Goalscorers ===
Season	Name	Club	Goals	Matches	G/M
1902-03	(United Kingdom) John Hogg	Orizaba	5	4	1.25
1903-04	(France) Julio Lacaud	Reforma AC	4	8	0.5
1904-05	(England) Percy Clifford	British Club	5	8	0.625
1905-06	(England) Charles M. Butlin	Reforma AC	6	8	0.75
1906-07	(England) Percy Clifford	British Club	5	8	0.625
1907-08	(United Kingdom) John Hogg	British Club	4	6	0.67
1908-09	(Mexico) Jorge Gómez De Parada (England) William Bray	Reforma AC; Pachuca AC	3; 3	4; 4	0.75; 0.75
1909-10	(England) Robert J. Blackmore	Reforma AC	4	6	0.67
1910-11	(England) Charles M. Butlin (England) Alfred C. Crowle	Reforma AC; Pachuca AC	2; 2	4; 4	0.5; 0.5
1911-12	(United Kingdom) John Hogg	British Club	3	4	0.75
1912-13	(Mexico) Jorge Gómez De Parada	México FC	5	10	0.5
1913-14	(Spain) Bernardo Rodríguez	Club España	6	8	0.75
1914-15	(England) Alfred C. Crowle	Pachuca AC	6	10	0.6
1915-16	(Spain) Lázaro Ibarreche	Club España	7	10	0.7
1916-17	(Spain) Lázaro Ibarreche	Club España	6	10	0.6
1917-18	(Spain) Lázaro Ibarreche (England) Frederick Williams (Mexico) Horacio Ortiz	Club España; Pachuca AC; Pachuca AC	5; 5; 5	10; 10; 10	0.5; 0.5; 0.5
1918-19	(Spain) Lázaro Ibarreche	Club España	11	12	0.92
1919-20	(Spain) Lázaro Ibarreche	Club España	13	16	0.81
1920-21					
1921-22					
1922-23					
1923-24					
1924-25	(Mexico) Ernesto Sota	América	10	-	-
1925-26	(Switzerland) Kurt Friederich	Germania FV	11	-	-
1926-27	(Mexico) Pedro Arruza (Mexico) Miguel Ruiz	Club España; Necaxa	13; 13	- -	- -
1927-28	(Mexico) Ernesto Sota	América	16	-	-
1928-29	(Mexico) Nicho Mejia	Atlante	12	-	-
1929-30	(Mexico) Jorge Sota	América	12	-	-
1930-31	No Tournament Held			-	-
1931-32	(Mexico) Juan Carreño (Peru) Julio Lores	Atlante; Necaxa	20; 20	- -	- -
1932-33	(Peru) Julio Lores	Necaxa	8	-	-
1933-34	(Mexico) José Pacheco	Asturias	12	-	-
1934-35	(Mexico) Hilario "Moco" López	Necaxa	17	-	-
1935-36	(Mexico) Hilario "Moco" López	Necaxa	14	-	-
1936-37	(Mexico) Hilario "Moco" López	Necaxa	11	-	-
1937-38	(Mexico) Efraín Ruiz	Asturias	13	-	-
1938-39	(Spain) Miguel Gual	Club España	20	-	-
1939-40	(Mexico) Alberco "Caballo" Mendoza	Atlante	15	-	-
1940-41	(Spain) Marti Ventolra	Atlante	17	14	1.21
1941-42	(Costa Rica) Rafael "Tico" Meza	Moctezuma	20	14	1.43
1942-43	(Mexico) Manuel Alonso	Marte	17	14	1.21

== See also ==
- Football in Mexico
- Liga Amateur de Veracruz
- Liga Occidental De Jalisco
