= 1936–37 Liga Mayor season =

Liga Mayor
- Season: 1936–37
- Champions: Club Necaxa (3rd title)
- Matches: 20
- Goals: 88 (4.4 per match)
- Top goalscorer: Hilario López (11 goals)

The 1936–37 season was the 15th edition of the amateur league called Liga Mayor.

== Standings ==
| Pos | Team | Pld | W | D | L | GF | GA | GD | Pts |
|---|---|---|---|---|---|---|---|---|---|
| 1 | Club Necaxa | 8 | 6 | 1 | 1 | 23 | 14 | +9 | 13 |
| 2 | Atlante FC | 8 | 4 | 1 | 3 | 20 | 14 | +6 | 9 |
| 3 | Club América | 8 | 2 | 3 | 3 | 13 | 19 | −6 | 7 |
| 4 | RC España | 8 | 1 | 4 | 3 | 16 | 17 | −1 | 6 |
| 5 | Asturias FC | 8 | 2 | 1 | 5 | 16 | 24 | −8 | 5 |

Source: RSSSF

=== Top goalscorers ===
| Player | Club | Goals |
|---|---|---|
| (Mexico) Hilario López | Club Necaxa | 11 |
