= Paleta frontón =

Peruvian sport

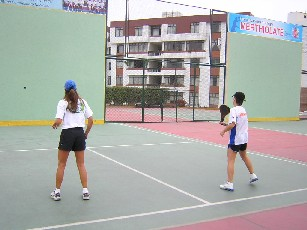
A paleta frontón court

Paleta frontón is a Peruvian sport that was born in the capital, Lima, in 1945. This sport has its roots in the "pelota vasca" brought by the Spanish settlers, and the domestic "pelota mano", called "handball" at that time due to English influence. The sport is similar to squash but is played on an open court.

A wooden, carbon fiber or glass fiber paddle and a black rubber ball are required to play paleta frontón. The paddle is made from Peruvian oak typically logged near water based townships.

The fronton court consists of a playing field with a concrete wall which is placed in front of the playing area. The concrete wall is 5 metres (16 ft) high by 6 metres (20 ft) wide. The court is 12 metres (39 ft) long and 7.6 metres (25 ft) wide. There are lines on the court limiting the play area and marking the reception zones, similar to tennis. The court is split into two sections horizontally with the section of the court closer to the wall called the service zone. The other section is further split vertically into two zones where players stand at the beginning of a point. The serve must bounce off the wall and land in the other zone.

The Federación Peruana de Paleta Frontón (FDPPF) is in charge of regulating the sport. The official rules, written in the "Reglamento Oficial", are provided to each player for free. The FDPPF is also in charge of organizing two national championships, the regionals and the "Campeón de Campeones" (Champion of Champions tournament).

Paleta frontón premiered at the 2019 Pan American Games in Lima under the category of Basque pelota.

== Technique ==
Those who are proficient in this sport must master: strokes, grip changes, spin, among others.

=== Blows ===
==== Drive ====
It is the basic stroke in fronton. It consists of hitting the ball after the bounce, or volleying it, directly, on the same side as the player's dominant arm.

==== Back or reverse ====
This shot is performed on the opposite side of the drive. It is difficult to master when starting out in this sport.

==== Counterboat ====
This shot is executed by hitting the ball just after the bounce, that is, against the bounce. It is quite difficult to master.

==== Volley ====
This shot is performed by hitting the ball before it bounces.

==== Smash ====
It is a shot hit from above shoulder height. It is also known as a spike or smash .

=== Effects or cuts ===
==== Topspin ====
This effect is more common in tennis . It is performed at the player's waist level and is executed from bottom to top.

==== Underspin ====
This effect is performed at the player's waist level and, unlike the previous one, it is performed from top to bottom.

==== Spin on the right side of the ball ====
This is one of the most commonly used effects. It is performed by hitting the drive ball from left to right at head height. Upon reaching the wall, the ball will open up to the side of the player's drive .

==== Spin on the left side of the ball ====
This effect is the opposite of the previous one and is performed from the back . You must hit the ball from right to left at head height. Upon reaching the wall, the ball will open up to the back side of the player who performed the shot.

==== Crane ====
This shot is performed from above, over the head. It is executed as follows: Starting at the back of the neck, the paddle is passed over the top of the head and extended until the arm is straight. Upon reaching the wall, the ball will bounce slightly and open up to the side of the player's drive .

==== Freight ====
This effect is achieved by hitting the drive ball from right to left at head height. Upon reaching the wall, the ball opens to the opposite side of the player's drive .

==== 3D ====
This is one of the most difficult and therefore one of the least common effects. It is performed by wrapping the ball, combining an up-and-down and an in-and-out motion after the bounce. Upon reaching the wall, the ball rises and opens up on the drive side of the player who executed the shot.
