= L'Amicale Française =

Mexican football club

- Full name: L'Amicale Française
- Founded: 1911
- Dissolved: 1924
- Ground: Parque Asturias; Mexico City
Home colours	Away colours

L'Amicale Française was a Mexican football club based in Mexico City, that played in the 1913–14 season of the Liga Mexicana de Football Amateur Association and later played in the 1920–21 season of the Liga Nacional.

== History ==
=== Foundation ===
L'Amicale Française was founded in 1911 by French migrants living in Mexico City, and joined the Liga Mexicana de Football Amateur Association for the 1913–14 season, its first season in league football.

=== 1913–14 season ===
L'Amicale played its first league match on 5 October 1913, losing 2–0 to España FC at Parque España II, where Bernardo Rodríguez and Delio Bonet scored for the hosts. A week later the club played its first home match, at the Campo de L'Amicale Française, drawing 2–2 with Pachuca AC; A. Lussignol scored one of L'Amicale's goals, the other being an own goal by Alfred C. Crowle.

Over the ten-match season L'Amicale also drew with Club México, Reforma AC and España FC, and lost twice to Rovers FC. The club finished sixth and last of the six clubs, with one win, four draws and five defeats, scoring nine goals and conceding sixteen, for six points; España FC won the championship with sixteen points. W. Cox was L'Amicale's top scorer, with three goals, and Claude M. Butlin of Reforma AC led the league with seven.

Two of the club's late fixtures were not played as normal matches. On 11 January 1914 the match at Pachuca was awarded to Pachuca after L'Amicale did not travel, and on 18 January the home fixture against Club México was also recorded as an awarded match. RSSSF notes that contemporary reports disagreed about the latter fixture: The Mexican Herald reported on 19 January that Club México had not appeared and that the match had been awarded to L'Amicale, but the figures in the final table published on 22 January were consistent only with the opposite result, so RSSSF left the question unresolved.

=== Tower Cup ===
In the Tower Cup in February 1914, L'Amicale won its first-round tie 1–0 away to Pachuca AC on 1 February, and then beat Reforma AC 2–1 in the second round on 8 February, with goals from Hermelin Jr. and Ernesto Spitalier. In the final, played on 22 February at the Campo del Reforma Athletic Club, L'Amicale lost 2–0 after extra time to Club México, with Arturo Ortiz and Luis Troncoso scoring in extra time, and finished as runners-up.

=== Retirement ===
L'Amicale and Reforma AC both left the league after the 1913–14 season, and the 1914–15 league was contested by only four clubs — España, Pachuca, Rovers and México FC — with neither L'Amicale nor Reforma taking part. The club fell apart because many players returned to France to defend their homeland.

=== Return in 1920–21 ===
Emilio Spittalier, a former player and co-founder of the club who had originally migrated to Mexico in 1910, returned after fighting in France and helped revive the club. The club returned to league football in 1920–21 in the Liga Nacional, a league formed by Club España that ran alongside the official Liga Mexicana. Its first match back, on 7 November 1920, was a 2–1 defeat by América at Parque España, with Mauro Guadarrama scoring L'Amicale's goal from a penalty.

L'Amicale beat Reforma AC 2–0 on 28 November, with goals from Sustaeta and Celis, drew with RC España on 5 December, beat Luz y Fuerza on 13 February, and beat RC España 1–0 on 13 March, with L. García scoring the only goal. Its defeats included a 3–1 loss to Luz y Fuerza on 26 December, a 2–1 loss to América on 2 January and a 2–0 loss to Reforma on 23 January.

L'Amicale finished third in the Liga Nacional, with three wins, one draw and four defeats from eight matches and seven points, behind RC España, who finished unbeaten with fourteen points, and América, with twelve. RSSSF's final table does not give the club's goals for and against. In the Copa Eliminatoria, the Liga Nacional cup, L'Amicale lost 0–1 to RC España in the first round on 3 April 1921.

=== Later years and dissolution ===
L'Amicale again played in the Liga Nacional in 1921–22. RSSSF records that Tigres withdrew in mid-season and that L'Amicale apparently replaced them; the club is recorded as playing Reforma AC on 26 February 1922, with the result unknown. L'Amicale and Reforma then withdrew because of a lack of players, and on 12 March the league announced a single match between RC España and América to decide the championship. The irregular 1920–21 and 1921–22 seasons of both leagues were later annulled, after the leagues merged on 28 August 1922 to form the Campeonato de Primera Fuerza of the Federación Mexicana de Football Association.

The club would struggle for a few years until 1924, when the club was dissolved. Many of the French players transferred to rival clubs México FC and Germania FV.

=== Primera Fuerza ===
Year	Pos	GP	W	T	L	GS	GA	PTS
1913–14	6	10	1	4	5	9	16	6
1920–21	3	8	3	1	4	—	—	7

Goals for and against for 1920–21 are not given in RSSSF's final table.

== See also ==
- Football in Mexico
