= Ernesto Sota =

Mexican footballer (1896-1977)

Personal information
- Date of birth: 11 December 1896
- Date of death: 25 May 1977 (aged 80)
- Position: Forward

Senior career*
Years	Team	Apps	(Gls)
- Club América

International career
1928	Mexico Olympic	2	(1)
- * Club domestic league appearances and goals

Ernesto Sota (11 December 1896 – 25 May 1977) was a Mexican footballer who represented his nation at the 1928 Summer Olympics in the Netherlands.
