= Mexico Cricket Club =

Mexican football club

México Cricket Club
- Full name: México Cricket Club
- Nicknames: Maestros (The Teachers); Rojiblancos (The Red-and-White)
- Short name: MCC
- Founded: 1901; 125 years ago (the football team)
- Dissolved: 1908; 118 years ago
- Ground: Campo del Paseo de la Reforma; Mexico City
- League: Liga Mexicana de Football Amateur Association

México Cricket Club was a cricket and football club based in Mexico City, that played in the Liga Mexicana de Football Amateur Association from 1902 to 1908. The cricket team was founded in 1827 and the football team in 1901. After its 1903–04 championship, most of its players joined San Pedro Golf Club, which played the 1904–05 season before changing its name to México Country Club; as México Country Club it played in 1905–06 and 1906–07.

== History ==
The club's history dates back to 1827, mainly playing cricket, a sport that, like football, was introduced to Mexico by English emigrant workers and was popular at the time and practiced in cities such as Puebla City, Pachuca, Monterrey and Mexico City. The first members were European merchants and diplomats. The original name was the Mexico Union Cricket Club. There were 27 founding members, and they played on Sundays. In 1838, the laws of the game were aligned with the Marylebone Cricket Club in the British Isles, except for the amount of balls in an over. In 1868, the newspaper The Two Republics started reporting on the club's matches every week. A year later, members of the club were departing, causing the club to temporarily shut down. In 1889, the club had its first reported match, starting their season again. In 1897 the club joined the Mexican National Cricket Club where each of the mentioned cities had a representative club, such as Puebla A.C..

=== Football beginnings ===
Association football began to be played in Mexico by the country's cricket clubs between 1899 and 1900, among them Reforma Cricket Club, British Club and Pachuca AC. On 2 June 1901, Reforma AC and British Club agreed to play an exhibition match at the Reforma AC grounds in Mexico City. Reforma won the match 2–0, with goals from Jack A. Branch and Alfred W. Laurie. Three more friendly matches followed: Reforma beat British Club 2–1 on 15 December 1901, British Club won 3–1 on 5 January 1902, and Reforma won 1–0 on 19 January 1902, with a goal by Claude M. Butlin. On 9 February 1902, an England XI beat a Scotland XI 3–2 at the Reforma grounds, and the two teams agreed to meet once a year.

=== Primera Fuerza ===
The Mexico Association Foot-ball League was formed on 19 July 1902, with five teams: Pachuca AC, Orizaba AC, Reforma AC, British Club and México Cricket Club. The teams played each other once, and the team with the most points won the championship. The annual match between England and Scotland was also established.

The league's first match was played on 19 October 1902, when México Cricket Club lost 1–5 to British Club at the grounds of México Cricket Club. Jack A. Branch scored for the home team, while James C. McNab scored twice, Edgar Jones scored twice and Percy C. Clifford scored from a penalty for British Club. México Cricket Club finished last in its first season, in fifth place, with one point from four matches, scoring one goal and conceding ten.

In the 1903–04 season, México Cricket Club won the league championship, its only league title. The club won seven of its eight matches and lost one, scoring thirteen goals and conceding one, for fourteen points.

=== Successor clubs ===
After the championship season, México Cricket Club dissolved, and most of its players joined San Pedro Golf Club, which entered the league for the 1904–05 season. San Pedro Golf Club finished fourth in 1904–05, with two wins, two draws and four defeats in eight matches, scoring eight goals and conceding thirteen, for six points.

San Pedro Golf Club then changed its name to México Country Club. As México Country Club, the team finished second in the 1905–06 season, with four wins, two draws and two defeats in eight matches, scoring seven goals and conceding three, for ten points.

After the 1906–07 season, México Country Club divided and retired from the league, and a new team, México FC, emerged from the division. México FC played in the league in the 1907–08 season.

=== Grounds ===
Matches were played at several grounds in Mexico City. The league's first match was played at the grounds of México Cricket Club, and the early exhibition matches were played at the Reforma AC grounds. Matches in later seasons were played at the Campo del Country Club and the Campo del Reforma AC.

=== League record ===
League finishes
Season	Team name	P	W	D	L	GF	GA	Pts	Pos.
1902–03	México Cricket Club	4	0	1	3	1	10	1	5th
1903–04	México Cricket Club	8	7	0	1	13	1	14	1st
1904–05	San Pedro Golf Club	8	2	2	4	8	13	6	4th
1905–06	México Country Club	8	4	2	2	7	3	10	2nd

Source: RSSSF

== Honours ==
=== Amateur ===
- Liga Mexicana de Football Amateur Association: 1903–04
