= C.F. Aurrerá =

Mexican football club

Aurrerá
- Full name: Club de Fútbol Aurrerá
- Nickname: Azules (Blues)
- Founded: 1919; 107 years ago
- Dissolved: 1929; 97 years ago
- Ground: Parque España and Club Reforma; Mexico City
- Capacity: 1,000
- 1928–29: 8th
Home colours

Club de Fútbol Aurrerá was a Mexican football club based in Mexico City, that played in the Campeonato de Primera Fuerza from 1923 to 1929.

== History ==
Aurrerá was founded in 1919, by a group of Spanish (Basque and Asturian) immigrants.

In the 1920–21 season the tournament was split into two leagues, one being the Mexican league and the other the National league. Aurrerá played in the National league with clubs América, Germania, España, L'Amicale Francaise, Reforma and Luz y Fuerza.

In the 1923–24 season the club joined "Liga Mexicana Amateur Association" and finished 4th. At the end of the 1928–29 season, the club retired from the league, folding soon after.
