= Centro Deportivo Español =

Deportivo Español
- Full name: Centro Deportivo Espanol
- Founded: 1914; 112 years ago
- Dissolved: 1920; 106 years ago
Home colours	Away colours

Centro Deportivo Español was a Mexican football club based in Mexico City, that played in the Liga Mexicana de Football Amateur Association (1915–1917, 1918–1920).

== History ==
Deportivo Español was founded in 1914 by the Spanish migrants that lived in Mexico City. The Spanish during this time period began forming many clubs in Mexico City. Besides Deportivo Español, these included Club España in 1912, Club Cataluya in 1917, Asturias in 1918, and Aurrerá in 1919 . The club began to participate in the league from the 1914–15 season and continued until it was dissolved in the 1919–20 season. During this period of time, people that had arrived in Mexico from Europe began forming clubs.

== Amateur era seasons ==
During the time Deportivo Español spent in the league it did not fare well in the standings. The team usually ended in the lower half of the standings until it dissolved after the 1919–20 season. During the 1917–18 season Deportivo Español did not participate in the Liga Mexicana Amateur de Football Association.

== See also ==
- Football in Mexico
