= Real Club España =

Mexican sports club in Mexico City

Real España
- Full name: Real Club España, A.C.
- Nicknames: Los Hispanistas (The Hispanists); Los Españistas (The Spaniards); Los Albinegros (The Black-and-White)
- Short name: RCE, ESP
- Sport: List: aerobics; basque pelota; billiards; canoeing; climbing wall; football; gymnastics; jai alai; mountaineering; paddle tennis; paleta frontón; rowing; Spanish dances; squash; swimming; tennis; volleyball; weightlifting
- Founded: 20 March 1912; 114 years ago (as España Foot-Ball Club)
- Folded: 23 July 1950; 76 years ago (the football team)
- Arena: Parque España; Mexico City
- Colors
- Website: clubespana.com.mx

Real Club España, A.C., simply known as Real España or Club España, is a Mexican sports club located in Mexico City. The club hosted a large variety of sports and other activities such as aerobics, basque pelota, billiards, canoeing, climbing wall, football, gymnastics, jai alai, mountaineering, paddle tennis, paleta frontón, rowing, Spanish dances, squash, swimming, tennis, volleyball and weightlifting. The football club was founded in 1912 under the name España Foot-Ball Club and changed its name to Real Club España in 1920.

The club was mostly known for its football team that played in the amateur leagues, starting in the Liga Mexicana de Football Amateur Association (1912–1920) and later in the Campeonato de Primera Fuerza/Liga Mayor (1922–1943). The football team also participated in the top professional division of Mexican football from 1943 until its withdrawal and subsequent disaffiliation in 1950. During the amateur era of Mexican football, Real España was one of the most popular and most successful teams, winning 13 amateur league titles (5 Liga Mexicana de Football Amateur Association titles, 6 Campeonato de Primera Fuerza/Liga Mayor titles and two Liga Nacional titles) and also won 7 cup amateur tournaments (4 Copa Tower titles and 3 Copa Eliminatoria titles). The club won 4 titles in the professional era of Mexican football, which were one Liga Mayor (1944–45), one Copa México (1943–44) and two Campeón de Campeones (1944 and 1945).

== History ==
=== Beginnings ===
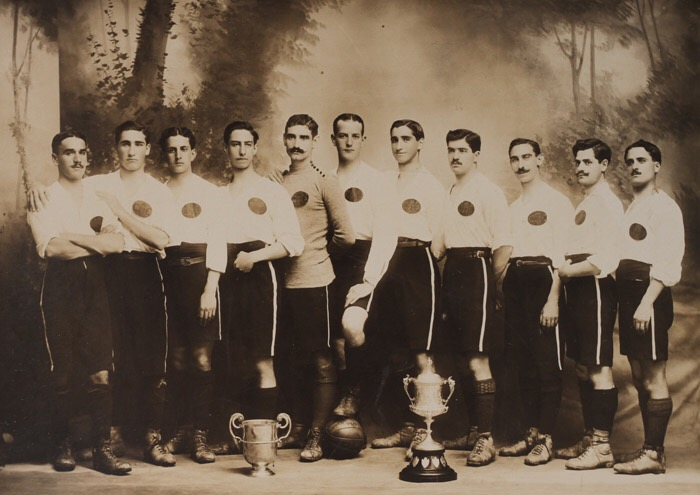
The España team that won the 1915–16 league title.

Football kit

España F.C. was founded on March 20, 1912 in Mexico City, product of a separation of the previous club "México F.C." which had been founded on 1910 by Alfredo B. Cuellar, Jorge Gómez de Parada and Alberto Montaña. With the initial purpose of playing football, the dream of a handful of young Spanish immigrants who, longing for their distant homeland, formed what would later become the glorious football team "España FC". Later in 1920, the work of rapprochement and unity that España FC began to exercise within the Hispanic community resulted in the fact that, through the mediation of Don Antonio de Zayas, Duke of Amalfi, Minister of Spain in Mexico, His Majesty Don Alfonso XIII, saw fit to grant our Institution the Title of Royal, calling itself from that date Real Club España.

Source: Club España history

=== Success ===
The success of Real Club España began immediately, the season after the club was founded, won its first amateur league title in the 1913–14 season of the Liga Mexicana de Football Amateur Association. They won their first double, but it would not stop there, as the club won a total of 13 amateur league titles and 7 amateur cup tournaments between 1912 and the beginning of the professional era of Mexican football.

When the first professional football league in Mexico was created in 1943, Real España was one of the favorites, but they lost the title to Asturias in a playoff match, and the next year won the title in the 1944–45 season. During the 1949–50 season, Real España withdrew due to disagreements with the Federación Mexicana de Fútbol (FMF) and were disaffiliated.

=== Present ===
Currently, Real España still exists, although not as a football club anymore. Their facilities continue to operate in Mexico City and—aside from football—the club offers members the option to take part in several sporting activities including rowing and tennis, among others. Its professional football program has been left in the past and only some fields, photographs and trophies survive.

== Reserves ==
=== España FC B ===
Amid the controversy Germania was accepted to play in the league. Germania was composed of German players who had come to Mexico. Rumors were that Amicale Française and Reforma had quit the league due to Germans being allowed in the league. The true reason was that during this time World War I was occurring in Europe causing the French and English in Mexico to go back to their countries to contribute in their respective armies. Mexico posed as a neutral country so that was the reason why Germania had been allowed to join. During the 1915–16 season of the Primera Fuerza España FC B began playing and was composed of extra players from Real Club España.

== Amateur era statistics ==
Club statistics in the amateur era of Mexican football.

Season	Pld	W	D	L	GF	GA	Pts	Position
1912–13	8	1	1	6	7	17	3	5th
1913–14	8	7	2	1	13	6	16	Champions
1914–15	6	5	1	0	8	1	11	Champions
1915–16	10	7	2	1	27	3	16	Champions
1916–17	10	6	3	1	17	10	15	Champions
1917–18	España FC withdrew							
1918–19	12	10	1	1	42	1	21	Champions
1919–20	España FC withdrew							
1920–21	The season was played separately (Liga Mexicana and Liga Nacional)							
1921–22	The season was played separately (Liga Mexicana and Liga Nacional)							
1922–23	14	7	3	4	20	12	17	4th
1923–24	16	9	6	1	27	6	24	Champions
1924–25	12	6	1	5	16	10	13	3rd
1925–26	12	6	3	3	26	11	15	3rd
1926–27	12	7	2	3	31	14	16	Runners-up
1927–28	14	7	2	5	33	13	16	3rd
1928–29	8	6	1	1	24	11	13	Runners-up
1929–30	14	9	1	4	32	22	19	Champions
1931–32	Didn't participate							
1932–33	8	2	3	3	20	27	7	4th
1933–34	12	8	1	3	31	24	17	Champions
1934–35	15	6	2	7	46	49	14	4th
1935–36	8	5	2	1	18	16	12	Champions
1936–37	8	1	4	3	16	17	6	4th
1937–38	10	3	1	6	27	27	7	4th
1938–39	12	5	1	6	41	37	11	5th
1939–40	15	10	2	3	46	31	22	Champions
1940–41	14	8	1	5	34	30	17	3rd
1941–42	14	7	4	3	38	26	16	Champions
1942–43	14	4	4	6	33	39	12	6th

After the 1942–43 season the first professional league was created and called the Liga Mayor.

== Historic Badges ==
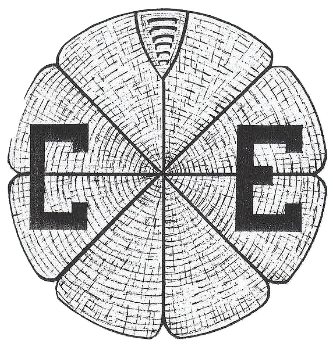
First badge 1912

Second badge 1920s

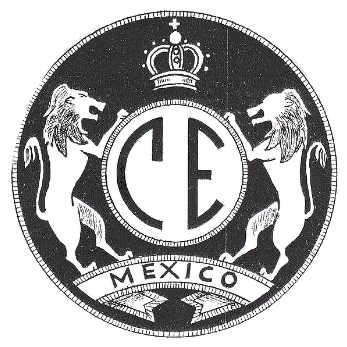
Third badge 1930s

== Honours ==
=== Top division ===
- Liga Mayor
  - Champions (1): 1944–45
  - Runners-up (1): 1943–44
- Copa México
  - Champions (1): 1943–44
- Campeón de Campeones
  - Champions (2): 1944, 1945

=== Amateur ===
- Liga Mexicana de Football Amateur Association: 1913–14, 1914–15, 1915–16, 1916–17, 1918–19
- Campeonato de Primera Fuerza/Liga Mayor: 1923–24, 1929–30, 1933–34, 1935–36, 1939–40, 1941–42
- Liga Nacional: 1920–21, 1921–22
- Copa Tower: 1914–15, 1916–17, 1917–18, 1918–19
- Copa Eliminatoria: 1920–21, 1921–22, 1927–28

=== Friendly ===
- Torneo Centenario: 1921
- Copa Covadonga: 1922–I, 1922–II
- Copa Alfonso XIII: 1919
- Copa Elche: 1919
