= Germania F.V. =

Germania
- Full name: Germania Fußball-Verein
- Nickname: Fúnebres (Funerals)
- Short name: GER, GFV
- Founded: 1915; 111 years ago
- Dissolved: 1933; 93 years ago
- Ground: Parque Alianza; Mexico City
- Capacity: 12,000
Home colours	Away colours

Germania Fußball-Verein was a Mexican football club based in Mexico City, that played in the Liga Mexicana de Football Amateur Association (1915–1917, 1918–1922) and later participated in the Campeonato de Primera Fuerza/Liga Mayor from 1922 to 1933.

== History ==
=== Beginnings ===
The club was founded in 1915 in a German immigrant community in Mexico City. The founders were Edvard Giffenig, Germán Stuht, Richard Obert, Walter Mues, and Carl Mues. In its first years, the club mostly finished last or close to the bottom of the standings.

In 1920, the Mexican federation split the tournament into two leagues: the national and the Mexican leagues. Germania played in the Mexican league along with Asturias F.C., México FC, Morelos and Deportivo Internacional, América, España, L´Amicale Francaise, Reforma, and Luz y Fuerza. In the same year, Germania won its only league title, though it was not officially recognised because of the political situation at the time.

=== 1922–1923 ===
Germania reinforced the club by signing Kurt Friederich, who had played in FC Zürich. On 6 May 1923, in a title match between Germania and Asturias F.C., Friedrich led Germania to a one-goal lead in the first half. In the second half, however, with the clubs tied at 1–1, Octavio Rimada managed to score for Asturias, giving the club a 2–1 lead which they held to the end of the match to once again proclaim themselves champions. Kurt Friederich was the top scorer of the tournament, with 12 goals in 13 games.

== Coaches ==
- (Germany) Richard Obert coached the club from 1915 to 1930
- (Spain) Juan Luqué de Serrallonga coached from 1930 to 1933

== Honours ==
=== Amateur ===
- Liga Mexicana de Football Amateur Association
  - Runners-up (1): 1919–20
- Campeonato de Primera Fuerza
  - Runners-up (1): 1922–23
- Copa Tower
  - Runners-up (1): 1921–22
- Copa Eliminatoria
  - Runners-up (1): 1922–23
- Copa México
  - Runners-up (1): 1932–33
