= CF México =

Mexican football club

- Full name: Club de Fútbol México, A.C.
- Nicknames: Los Rábanos (The Radishes); Los Rojos del México (The Reds of Mexico)
- Founded: 1910; 116 years ago
- Dissolved: 1934; 92 years ago
- Ground: Club San Pedro de los Pinos; Mexico City
| Home colours | Away colours |

Club de Fútbol México, A.C., also known as Club México, was a Mexican football club based in Mexico City, that competed in the Liga Mexicana de Football Amateur Association (1912–1918, 1919–1922) and also competed in the Campeonato de Primera Fuerza (1922–1930, 1932–1934).

== History ==
As the Mexican revolution was taking place in 1910, Club San Pedro de los Pinos was officially founded by a group of locals headed by Alfredo B. Cuellar, Jorge Gómez de Parada and Alberto Sierra. The club would be accepted and invited to play in the amateur league in 1912 and would take on the name of México FC.

In its first years, the club would obtain the 1912–13 amateur league title after reinforcing themselves with players mainly from England, but the club was still mainly made out of mostly Mexican players.

== 1912–13 season champions ==
- League: Liga Mexicana de Football Amateur Association
- Trainer: Antonio Sierra
- Squad:
  - (Mexico) Bartolomé Vargas Lugo
  - (Mexico) Sabino Morales
  - (Mexico) Diez Vivanco
  - (Mexico) Carlos Troncoso
  - (Mexico) Carlos Elguero
  - (Mexico) Carlos Miranda
  - (Mexico) Jorge Gómez De Parada
  - (Mexico) Abigail Quiroz
  - (Mexico) Serafín Cerón
  - (United Kingdom) George Griffen
  - (United Kingdom) Albert Smith
  - (United Kingdom) Peter Little

== Amateur era statistics ==
The club's participations in the Liga Mexicana de Football Amateur Association were held from 1912 to 1918 and from 1919 to 1922, and also in the Campeonato de Primera Fuerza/Liga Mayor from 1922 to 1930 and from 1932 to 1934.

| Year | Position | Games played | Won | Tied | Lost | Goals Scored | Goals Against | Points | Postseason place |
|---|---|---|---|---|---|---|---|---|---|
| 1912-13 | 1 | 10 | 5 | 3 | 2 | 17 | 8 | 13 | Champion |
| 1913-14 | 4 | 8 | 2 | 1 | 5 | 7 | 12 | 5 | |
| 1914-15 | 5 | 10 | 2 | 2 | 6 | 6 | 10 | 6 | |
| 1915-16 | 2 | 10 | 7 | 0 | 3 | 16 | 8 | 14 | |
| 1916-17 | 4 | 10 | 4 | 1 | 5 | 12 | 12 | 9 | |
| 1917-18 | 3 | 10 | 4 | 2 | 4 | 13 | 8 | 10 | |
| 1918-19 | - | - | - | - | - | - | - | - | |
| 1919-20 | 5 | 16 | 5 | 4 | 7 | 12 | 15 | 14 | |
| 1920-21 | - | - | - | - | - | - | - | - | Unknown |
| 1921-22 | - | - | - | - | - | - | - | - | Unknown |
| 1922-23 | 6 | 14 | 1 | 6 | 7 | 10 | 18 | 8 | |
| 1923-24 | 6 | 16 | 3 | 5 | 8 | 12 | 24 | 11 | |
| 1924-25 | 6 | 12 | 3 | 3 | 6 | 10 | 23 | 9 | |
| 1925-26 | 7 | 12 | 1 | 1 | 10 | 13 | 41 | 3 | Last place |
| 1926-27 | 4 | 12 | 6 | 3 | 3 | 29 | 10 | 15 | |
| 1927-28 | 4 | 14 | 6 | 4 | 4 | 21 | 22 | 16 | |
| 1928-29 | 9 | 8 | 0 | 1 | 7 | 14 | 40 | 1 | Last place |
| 1929-30 | 7 | 14 | 2 | 2 | 10 | 15 | 44 | 6 | |
| 1930-31 | 0 | 0 | 0 | 0 | 0 | 0 | 0 | 0 | Was not held |
| 1931-32 | 0 | 0 | 0 | 0 | 0 | 0 | 0 | 0 | Did not participate |
| 1932-33 | 9 | 8 | 2 | 2 | 4 | 22 | 27 | 6 | |
| 1933-34 | 6 | 10 | 2 | 0 | 8 | 18 | 34 | 4 | |

== Honours ==
=== Amateur ===
- Liga Mexicana de Football Amateur Association: 1912–13
- Copa Tower: 1912–13, 1913–14, 1920–21

== See also ==
- Football in Mexico
- British Club
- Albinegros de Orizaba
