= Asturias amateur football team =

Spanish football team

- Association: Royal Asturias Football Federation (RFFPA)
- Head coach: Clemente García
- Most caps: Rubén Fernández (14)
- Top scorer: Alberto Morán (5)
First colours	Second colours

First international
- Asturias 2–3 Andalusia (Burgos, Spain; 18 May 2000)

Biggest win
- Asturias 7–0 Andorra (Antwerp, Belgium; 15 November 2002); Asturias 7–0 Ceuta (El Berrón, Spain; 9 December 2007)

Biggest defeat
- Asturias 0–3 Galicia (El Berrón, Spain; 8 December 2017)

UEFA Regions' Cup
- Appearances: 1 (first in 2003)
- Best result: Final tournament, 2003

Spanish stage of the UEFA Regions' Cup
- Appearances: 12 (first in 2000)
- Best result: Champions, 2002

The Asturias amateur football team is a football team composed of Asturian players of Tercera División and lower divisions. The team plays in the UEFA Regions' Cup, with their most important achievement being qualification to the Final tournament of the 2003 UEFA Regions' Cup after winning the Spanish stage and all previous matches in the European rounds.

== History ==
The Asturias amateur team was created to defend the Asturian Country in the UEFA Regions' Cup. The team made its debut on 18 May 2000 in 3-2 loss to Andalusia.

== Amateur team (UEFA Regions' Cup) ==
=== Results summary ===
Overall							National games						International games					
Pld	W	D	L	GF	GA	GD	W	D	L	GF	GA	GD	W	D	L	GF	GA	GD
53	27	12	14	89	47	+42	22	10	13	72	44	+28	5	2	1	17	3	+14

Updated to 30 November 2025.

=== Matches ===
URC edition	Date	Round	Host	Opponent	Score
2001	18 May 2000	Spanish first round	(Castile and León) Burgos	Andalusia	2–3
2001	19 May 2000	Spanish first round	(Castile and León) Burgos	Castile and León	0–0
2001	21 May 2000	Spanish first round	(Castile and León) Burgos	Basque Country	1–2
2003	7 Dec 2001	Spanish first round	(Andalusia) Los Barrios	Aragon	2–1
2003	8 Dec 2001	Spanish first round	(Andalusia) Los Barrios	Andalusia	1–0
2003	29 Mar 2002	Spanish semifinal	(Community of Madrid) Alcalá de Henares	(Community of Madrid) Madrid	2–1
2003	31 Mar 2002	Spanish final	(Community of Madrid) Alcalá de Henares	Basque Country	0–0
2003	15 Nov 2002	European preliminary round	(Belgium) Overpelt	Andorra	7–0
2003	16 Nov 2002	European preliminary round	(Belgium) Overpelt	(Belgium) Ligue Nord	1–0
2003	18 Nov 2002	European preliminary round	(Belgium) Bocholt	South-East Finland	5–0
2003	16 Apr 2003	European Intermediate round	(Central Bohemian Region) Central Bohemia	(Central Bohemian Region) Central Bohemia	1–0
2003	7 May 2003	European Intermediate round	(Asturias) Luanco	(Central Bohemian Region) Central Bohemia	1–0
2003	22 Jun 2003	European final round group stage	(Kingdom of Württemberg) Heidenheim	Piedmont–Aosta Valley	1–1
2003	24 Jun 2003	European final round group stage	(Kingdom of Württemberg) Schwäbisch Gmünd	(Kingdom of Württemberg) Württemberg	1–1
2003	26 Jun 2003	European final round group stage	(Kingdom of Württemberg) Schwäbisch Gmünd	Ticino	0–1
2005	6 Dec 2003	Spanish first round	(Asturias) Sotrondio	Castile and León	0–0
2005	8 Dec 2003	Spanish first round	(Asturias) Gijón	Cantabria	3–0
2005	25 Feb 2004	Spanish Intermediate round	(Valencian Community) Picassent	Valencian Community	0–0
2005	10 Mar 2004	Spanish Intermediate round	Asturias	Valencian Community	3–0
2005	8 Apr 2004	Spanish semifinal	(Community of Madrid) Las Rozas	Galicia	1–1
2005	10 Apr 2004	Spanish final	(Community of Madrid) Las Rozas	Basque Country	1–3
2007	2 Dec 2005	Spanish first round	(Asturias) Luanco	Extremadura	2–0
2007	4 Dec 2005	Spanish first round	(Asturias) Villaviciosa	Melilla	4–0
2007	15 Feb 2006	Spanish Intermediate round	Balearic Islands	Balearic Islands	1–1
2007	22 Feb 2006	Spanish Intermediate round	(Asturias) El Berrón	Balearic Islands	4–1
2007	14 Apr 2006	Spanish semifinal	(Basque Country (autonomous community)) Portugalete	Catalonia	0–1
2009	7 Dec 2007	Spanish first round	(Asturias) Sotrondio	Balearic Islands	2–1
2009	9 Dec 2007	Spanish first round	(Asturias) El Berrón	Ceuta	7–0
2009	30 Jan 2008	Spanish Intermediate round	(Asturias) Villaviciosa	Basque Country	1–1
2009	13 Feb 2008	Spanish Intermediate round	(Basque Country (autonomous community)) Muskiz	Basque Country	0–1
2011	6 Dec 2009	Spanish first round	(Asturias) Villaviciosa	Aragon	0–1
2011	8 Dec 2009	Spanish first round	(Asturias) Gijón	Canary Islands	1–2
2013	9 Dec 2011	Spanish first round	(Community of Madrid) Aranjuez	Aragon	2–0
2013	10 Dec 2011	Spanish first round	(Community of Madrid) Aranjuez	Galicia	3–1
2013	6 Apr 2012	Spanish semifinal	(Asturias) Villaviciosa	Murcia	4–1
2013	8 Apr 2012	Spanish final	(Asturias) Gijón	Catalonia	1–2
2015	6 Dec 2013	Spanish first round	Ceuta	Galicia	2–2
2015	7 Dec 2013	Spanish first round	Ceuta	Murcia	0–1
2017	4 Dec 2015	Spanish first round	(Asturias) El Berrón	(Community of Madrid) Madrid	2–0
2017	6 Dec 2015	Spanish first round	(Asturias) Avilés	Melilla	1–0
2017	10 Feb 2016	Spanish Intermediate round	(Asturias) Pola de Lena	Extremadura	1–0
2017	24 Feb 2016	Spanish Intermediate round	(Extremadura) Calamonte	Extremadura	1–0
2017	25 Mar 2016	Spanish semifinal	(Castilla–La Mancha) Puertollano	Ceuta	1–0
2017	27 Mar 2016	Spanish final	(Castilla–La Mancha) Puertollano	Castile and León	0–2
2019	8 Dec 2017	Spanish first round	(Asturias) El Berrón	Galicia	0–3
2019	10 Dec 2017	Spanish first round	(Asturias) Pola de Siero	Cantabria	4–2
2021	7 Dec 2019	Spanish first round	(Andalusia) Vícar	Valencian Community	2–1
2021	8 Dec 2019	Spanish first round	(Andalusia) Vícar	Andalusia	2–3
2025	8 Dec 2023	Spanish first round	(Asturias) El Entrego	Murcia	1–1
2025	10 Dec 2023	Spanish first round	(Asturias) El Entrego	Basque Country	2–0
2025	31 Jan 2024	Intermediate round	(Asturias) El Entrego	Galicia	0–1
2027	29 Nov 2025	Spanish first round	(Navarre) Aoiz	Cantabria	2–2
2027	30 Nov 2025	Spanish first round	(Navarre) Aoiz	Murcia	3–2

=== Head to head against other Autonomous Communities ===
Team	Pld	W	D	L	GF	GA	GD
Andalusia	3	1	0	2	5	6	–1
Aragon	3	2	0	1	4	2	+2
Balearic Islands	3	2	1	0	7	3	+4
Basque Country	5	0	2	3	3	7	–4
Canary Islands	1	0	0	1	1	2	–1
Cantabria	3	2	1	0	9	4	+5
Castile and León	3	0	2	1	0	2	–2
(Castilla–La Mancha) Castile-La Mancha	Did not play						
Catalonia	2	0	0	2	1	3	–2
Ceuta	2	2	0	0	8	0	+8
Extremadura	3	3	0	0	4	0	+4
Galicia	4	1	2	1	6	7	–1
La Rioja	Did not play						
(Community of Madrid) Madrid	2	2	0	0	4	1	+3
Melilla	2	2	0	0	5	0	+5
Murcia	3	2	0	1	7	4	+3
Navarre	Did not play						
Valencian Community	3	2	1	0	5	1	+4

== See also ==
- Asturias autonomous football team
- Category:Footballers from Asturias
