= List of Spanish regional football federations =

The Spanish regional football federations are the association football governing bodies (alongside the Royal Spanish Football Federation) of each autonomous community in Spain. Most of them have their own football team.

The 19 Football Federations are:

1. Royal Andalusian Football Federation (Andalusia). Andalusia autonomous football team.
2. Royal Aragonese Football Federation (Aragon). Aragon official football team
3. Royal Football Federation of the Principality of Asturias (Asturias). Asturias autonomous football team
4. Balearic Islands Football Federation (Balearic Islands). Balearic Islands autonomous football team
5. Basque Football Federation (Basque Country). Basque Country national football team
6. Canarian Football Federation (Canary Islands). Canary Islands autonomous football team
7. Royal Cantabrian Football Federation (Cantabria). Cantabria autonomous football team
8. Royal Castile and León Football Federation (Castile and León). Castile and León autonomous football team
9. Castilla–La Mancha Football Federation (Castile–La Mancha).
10. Catalan Football Federation (Catalonia). Catalonia national football team
11. Ceuta Football Federation (Ceuta).
12. Extremaduran Football Federation (Extremadura). Extremadura autonomous football team
13. Royal Galician Football Federation (Galicia). Galicia national football team
14. Royal Madrid Football Federation (Community of Madrid). Madrid autonomous football team
15. Royal Melillan Football Federation (Melilla).
16. Football Federation of the Region of Murcia (Region of Murcia). Region of Murcia autonomous football team
17. Navarre Football Federation (Navarre). Navarre autonomous football team
18. Riojan Football Federation (La Rioja).
19. Valencian Community Football Federation (Valencian Community). Valencian Community autonomous football team
