= 2025–26 Spanish stage of the UEFA Regions' Cup =

Tournament details
- Host country: Spain
- Dates: 28 November 2025 – 1 March 2026
- Teams: 17

The 2025–26 Spanish stage of the UEFA Regions' Cup is the 13th staging of Spanish stage of the UEFA Regions' Cup. The winners will qualify for the 2027 UEFA Regions' Cup.

17 teams participated as Ceuta and Melilla resigned to join the competition. Aragon are the defending champions.

== Competition format ==
The 17 teams joined the preliminary round, played as mini-tournaments with three or four teams in each group, where eight teams advanced to further stages.

The draw of the first stage was held on 9 October 2025.

== Preliminary stage ==
=== Group A ===
Matches were played in Navarre.

Pos	Team	Pld	W	D	L	GF	GA	GD	Pts	Qualification	(Navarre)	(Asturias)	(Cantabria)	(Region of Murcia)
1	Navarre (H)	2	2	0	0	7	0	+7	6	Intermediate round	—	—	—	3–0
2	Asturias	2	1	1	0	5	4	+1	4	Intermediate round	—	—	2–2	—
3	Cantabria	2	0	1	1	2	6	−4	1		0–4	—	—	—
4	Murcia	2	0	0	2	2	6	−4	0		—	2–3	—	—

Updated to match(es) played on finished. Source:
(H) Hosts

=== Group B ===
Matches were played in Castile-La Mancha.

Pos	Team	Pld	W	D	L	GF	GA	GD	Pts	Qualification	(La Rioja)	(Basque Country (autonomous community))	(Castilla–La Mancha)	(Balearic Islands)
1	La Rioja	2	2	0	0	5	1	+4	6	Intermediate round	—	—	—	3–1
2	Basque Country	2	1	1	0	3	1	+2	4	Intermediate round	—	—	1–1	—
3	Castilla–La Mancha (H)	2	0	1	1	1	3	−2	1		0–2	—	—	—
4	Balearic Islands	2	0	0	2	1	5	−4	0		—	0–2	—	—

Updated to match(es) played on finished. Source:
(H) Hosts

=== Group C ===
Matches were played in Barcelona.

Pos	Team	Pld	W	D	L	GF	GA	GD	Pts	Qualification	(Catalonia)	(Valencian Community)	(Community of Madrid)
1	Catalonia (H)	2	1	1	0	2	0	+2	4	Intermediate round	—	—	2–0
2	Valencian Community	2	0	2	0	1	1	0	2		0–0	—	—
3	Madrid	2	0	1	1	1	3	−2	1		—	1–1	—

Updated to match(es) played on finished. Source:
(H) Hosts

=== Group D ===
Matches were played in Palencia and Becerril de Campos.

Pos	Team	Pld	W	D	L	GF	GA	GD	Pts	Qualification	(Galicia (Spain))	(Andalusia)	(Castile and León)
1	Galicia	2	1	1	0	5	2	+3	4	Intermediate round	—	3–0	—
2	Andalusia	2	1	0	1	2	4	−2	3		—	—	2–1
3	Castile and León (H)	2	0	1	1	3	4	−1	1		2–2	—	—

Updated to match(es) played on finished. Source:
(H) Hosts

=== Group E ===
Matches were played in Zaragoza.

Pos	Team	Pld	W	D	L	GF	GA	GD	Pts	Qualification	(Canary Islands)	(Aragon)	(Extremadura)
1	Canary Islands	2	1	1	0	2	0	+2	4	Intermediate round	—	—	2–0
2	Aragon (H)	2	1	1	0	1	0	+1	4	Intermediate round	0–0	—	—
3	Extremadura	2	0	0	2	0	3	−3	0		—	0–1	—

Updated to match(es) played on finished. Source:
(H) Hosts

=== Ranking of second-placed teams ===
Pos	Grp	Team	Pld	W	D	L	GF	GA	GD	Pts	Qualification
1	B	Basque Country	2	1	1	0	3	1	+2	4	Qualification for intermediate round
2	A	Asturias	2	1	1	0	5	4	+1	4	Qualification for intermediate round
3	E	Aragon	2	1	1	0	1	0	+1	4	Qualification for intermediate round
4	D	Andalusia	2	1	0	1	2	4	−2	3	
5	C	Valencian Community	2	0	2	0	1	1	0	2	

== Intermediate round ==
The intermediate stage was played as a single game, on 28 and 29 January 2026. The draw was held at the RFEF headquarters on 7 January 2026.

Team 1	Score	Team 2
Catalonia	2–0	Aragon
Galicia	3–0	Asturias
Navarre	2–1	Basque Country
Canary Islands	3–0	La Rioja

== Final Four ==
The Final Four was played on 27 February and 1 March 2026 at the Olympic Stadium in Terrassa, Catalonia.

=== Bracket ===
Semifinals
27 February 2026
Galicia	0
Canary Islands	1
27 February 2026
Catalonia	2
Navarre	4

Final
1 March 2026
Canary Islands	1
Navarre	0
