= Catalonia national amateur football team =

Amateur football team of Catalonia, Spain

Catalonia
- Association: Catalan Football Federation (Federació Catalana de Futbol)
- Confederation: None
First colours

First international
- Catalonia 2–4 Castile-La Mancha (Castilla–La Mancha) (Valencian Community, Spain)

Biggest win
- Telenești 0–10 Catalonia (Vadul lui Vodă, Moldova; 25 September 2014)

Biggest defeat
- Catalonia 2–4 Castile-La Mancha (Castilla–La Mancha) (Valencian Community, Spain)

UEFA Regions' Cup
- Appearances: 2 (first in 2013)
- Best result: Runners-up (2013)

Spanish stage of the UEFA Regions' Cup
- Appearances: 10 (first in 1999–2000)
- Best result: Winners (2011–12, 2013–14)

The Catalonia national amateur football team (Catalan: Selecció de futbol amateur de Catalunya) is the official amateur football team of Catalonia. It is controlled by the Catalan Football Federation.

== History ==
=== Composition ===
The team is composed of players who play in the Tercera División Group 5 and regional lower divisions - all operated autonomously within Catalonia but under the pyramid of the Spanish football league system - with eligibility criteria being club (must play for a club in the territory), age (must be between 18 and 35) and amateur status (must never have signed a contract as a professional).

=== Participation in competitions ===
The team plays in the biennial UEFA Regions' Cup and they were runners-up in the overall pan-European tournament in 2013, having won the preceding Spanish qualifying tournament in 2011–12. The Catalans retained the national stage title (where they compete against equivalent teams from each of the autonomous communities of Spain) in 2013–14, but did not progress from their intermediate group in the subsequent 2015 UEFA Regions' Cup.

== Matches ==
Catalonia score listed first in all matches.

| URC edition | Round | Opponent | Score |
|---|---|---|---|
| 2001 | 1999–00 Spanish first round (Note: Held in Valencian Community.) | (Castilla–La Mancha) Castile-La Mancha | 2–4 |
| 2001 | 1999–00 Spanish first round | Balearic Islands | 1–1 |
| 2001 | 1999–00 Spanish first round | Valencian Community | 1–0 |
| 2003 | 2001–02 Spanish first round (Note: Held in Catalonia.) | Balearic Islands | 0–1 |
| 2003 | 2001–02 Spanish first round | Basque Country | 1–4 |
| 2005 | 2003–04 Spanish first round (Note: Held in Murcia.) | Murcia | 2–3 |
| 2005 | 2003–04 Spanish first round | Madrid | 2–4 |
| 2007 | 2005–06 Spanish first round | Ceuta | 3–0 |
| 2007 | 2005–06 Spanish first round | Galicia | 4–3 |
| 2007 | Spanish quarter-final | (Castilla–La Mancha) Castile-La Mancha | 1–1 |
| 2007 | Spanish quarter-final | (Castilla–La Mancha) Castile-La Mancha | a0–0 |
| 2007 | Spanish semi-final (Note: Held in Left Bank (Biscay).) | Asturias | 1–0 |
| 2007 | Spanish final | Basque Country | 1–1p (Note: Basque Country won a penalty shootout 3–0.) |
| 2009 | 2007–08 Spanish first round (Note: Held in Navarre.) | Canary Islands | 5–1 |
| 2009 | 2007–08 Spanish first round | Galicia | 2–0 |
| 2009 | Spanish quarter-final | Valencian Community | 0–0 |
| 2009 | Spanish quarter-final | Valencian Community | 3–1 |
| 2009 | Spanish semi-final (Note: Held in El Vendrell.) | Andalusia | 0–1 |
| 2011 | 2009–10 Spanish first round (Note: Held in Andalusia.) | Andalusia | 0–1 |
| 2011 | 2009–10 Spanish first round | Cantabria | 3–1 |
| 2013 | 2011–12 Spanish first round | Extremadura | 2–1 |
| 2013 | 2011–12 Spanish first round | Basque Country | 4–0 |
| 2013 | Spanish semi-final (Note: Held in Asturias.) | Castile and León | 3–2 |
| 2013 | Spanish final | Asturias | 2–1 |
| 2013 | European Intermediate round (Note: Held in Kyiv Oblast.) | (Belgium) Ardennes | 2–1 |
| 2013 | European Intermediate round | (Slovenia) Ljubljana | 2–0 |
| 2013 | European Intermediate round | (Ukraine) Nove Zhytya | 4–1 |
| 2013 | European Final group (Note: Held in Veneto.) | (Belarus) Isloch | 2–0 |
| 2013 | European Final group | (Bulgaria) Yugoiztochen | 2–2 |
| 2013 | European Final group | (Russia) Olimp Moscow | 1–0 |
| 2013 | European final | (Italy) Veneto | 0–0p (Note: Veneto won a penalty shootout 5–4.) |
| 2015 | 2013–14 Spanish first round | Aragon | 2–1 |
| 2015 | 2013–14 Spanish first round | Balearic Islands | 1–1 |
| 2015 | Spanish semi-final (Note: Held in Segovia.) | Murcia | 2–2 (Note: Catalonia won a penalty shootout 5–4.) |
| 2015 | Spanish final | Andalusia | 0–0 (Note: Catalonia won a penalty shootout 5–4.) |
| 2015 | European Intermediate round (Note: Held in Moldova.) | (Ukraine) AF Pyatykhatska | 4–0 |
| 2015 | European Intermediate round | (Moldova) Telenești District | 10–0 |
| 2015 | European Intermediate round | (Northern Ireland) Eastern NI Region | 0–1 |
| 2017 | 2015–16 Spanish first round (Note: Held in Murcia.) | Murcia | 1–2 |
| 2017 | 2015–16 Spanish first round | (Castilla–La Mancha) Castile-La Mancha | 1–2 |
| 2019 | 2017–18 Spanish first round | Navarre | 1–1 |
| 2019 | 2017–18 Spanish first round | Extremadura | 9–0 |
| 2019 | Spanish quarter-final | Castile and León | 3–1 |
| 2019 | Spanish quarter-final | Castile and León | a0–2 |

=== Results summary ===
As of December 2017

| Overall | | | | Spanish phase | | | | International phase | | | |
| Pld | W | D | L | Pld | W | D | L | Pld | W | D | L |
|---|---|---|---|---|---|---|---|---|---|---|---|
| 44 | 22 | 11 | 11 | 34 | 15 | 9 | 10 | 10 | 7 | 2 | 1 |

=== Head-to-head against other Autonomous Communities ===
As of December 2017

| Team | Pld | W | D | L | GF | GA | GD |
|---|---|---|---|---|---|---|---|
| Andalusia | 3 | 0 | 1 | 2 | 0 | 2 | -2 |
| Aragon | 1 | 1 | 0 | 0 | 2 | 1 | +1 |
| Asturias | 2 | 2 | 0 | 0 | 3 | 1 | +2 |
| Balearic Islands | 3 | 0 | 2 | 1 | 2 | 3 | +1 |
| Basque Country | 3 | 1 | 1 | 1 | 6 | 5 | +1 |
| Canary Islands | 1 | 1 | 0 | 0 | 5 | 1 | +4 |
| Cantabria | 1 | 1 | 0 | 0 | 3 | 1 | +2 |
| Castile and León | 3 | 2 | 0 | 1 | 6 | 5 | +1 |
| (Castilla–La Mancha) Castile-La Mancha | 4 | 0 | 2 | 2 | 4 | 7 | -3 |
| Ceuta | 1 | 1 | 0 | 0 | 3 | 0 | +3 |
| Extremadura | 2 | 2 | 0 | 0 | 11 | 1 | +10 |
| Galicia | 2 | 2 | 0 | 0 | 6 | 3 | +3 |
| La Rioja | Never played | | | | | | |
| Madrid | 1 | 0 | 0 | 1 | 2 | 4 | -2 |
| Melilla | Never played | | | | | | |
| Murcia | 3 | 0 | 1 | 2 | 5 | 7 | -2 |
| Navarre | 1 | 0 | 1 | 0 | 1 | 1 | 0 |
| Valencian Community | 3 | 2 | 1 | 0 | 4 | 1 | +3 |
| Total | 34 | 15 | 9 | 10 | 62 | 43 | +19 |

== See also ==
- Catalonia national football team (professional)
