= 2019–20 Spanish stage of the UEFA Regions' Cup =

Tournament details
- Host country: Spain
- Dates: 5 December 2019 – 11 March 2020
- Teams: 18

Final positions
- Champions: Galicia (2nd title)
- Runners-up: Andalusia

The 2019–20 Spanish stage of the UEFA Regions' Cup was the 13th staging of Spanish stage of the UEFA Regions' Cup. The winners will qualify for the 2021 UEFA Regions' Cup.

Despite initially having registered all the 19 teams for the first time since the 2007–08 edition, Murcia withdrew from the tournament before its start. La Rioja came back to the competition 12 years after their last participation.

Castile and León were the defending champions, but finally Galicia achieved their second tournament ever.

== Competition format ==
The 18 teams joined the preliminary round, played as mini-tournaments with three teams in each group, where only the first qualified team will advance to further stages. All teams would play two games in the group stage.

The winners of groups C, D, E and F joined the intermediate stage while the winners of the groups A and B directly qualified for the semifinals.

== Preliminary stage ==
=== Group A ===
Matches will be played in Arroyo de San Serván and Puebla de la Calzada, Badajoz.

Pos	Team	Pld	W	D	L	GF	GA	GD	Pts	Qualification	(Extremadura)	(Aragon)	(Catalonia)
1	Extremadura (H)	2	1	1	0	2	1	+1	4	Final stage	—	2–1	—
2	Aragon	2	1	0	1	2	2	0	3		—	—	1–0
3	Catalonia	2	0	1	1	0	1	−1	1		0–0	—	—

Source: RFEF
(H) Hosts

=== Group B ===
Matches will be played in Vícar, Almería.

Pos	Team	Pld	W	D	L	GF	GA	GD	Pts	Qualification	(Andalusia)	(Asturias)	(Valencian Community)
1	Andalusia (H)	2	1	1	0	3	2	+1	4	Final stage	—	3–2	—
2	Asturias	2	1	0	1	4	4	0	3		—	—	2–1
3	Valencian Community	2	0	1	1	1	2	−1	1		0–0	—	—

Source: RFEF
(H) Hosts

=== Group C ===
Matches will be played in Torrelodones.

Pos	Team	Pld	W	D	L	GF	GA	GD	Pts	Qualification	(Basque Country (autonomous community))	(Community of Madrid)	(Canary Islands)
1	Basque Country	2	1	1	0	2	0	+2	4	Intermediate round	—	—	0–0
2	Madrid (H)	2	1	0	1	1	2	−1	3		2–0	—	—
3	Canary Islands	2	0	1	1	0	1	−1	1		—	0–1	—

Source: RFEF
(H) Hosts

=== Group D ===
Matches will be played in Santa Eulària des Riu, San Rafael and Ibiza Town, Ibiza.

Pos	Team	Pld	W	D	L	GF	GA	GD	Pts	Qualification	(Balearic Islands)	(Cantabria)	(Navarre)
1	Balearic Islands (H)	2	2	0	0	2	0	+2	6	Intermediate round	—	1–0	—
2	Cantabria	2	1	0	1	1	0	+1	3		—	—	3–0
3	Navarre	2	0	0	2	0	4	−4	0		0–1	—	—

Source: RFEF
(H) Hosts

=== Group E ===
Matches will be played in Haro.

Pos	Team	Pld	W	D	L	GF	GA	GD	Pts	Qualification	(La Rioja)	(Castile and León)	(Melilla)
1	La Rioja (H)	2	1	1	0	4	1	+3	4	Intermediate round	—	1–1	—
2	Castile and León	2	1	1	0	3	2	+1	4		—	—	2–1
3	Melilla	2	0	0	2	1	5	−4	0		0–3	—	—

Source: RFEF
(H) Hosts

=== Group F ===
Matches will be played in Sanxenxo and A Illa de Arousa, Pontevedra.

Pos	Team	Pld	W	D	L	GF	GA	GD	Pts	Qualification	(Galicia (Spain))	(Castilla–La Mancha)	(Ceuta)
1	Galicia (H)	2	2	0	0	6	0	+6	6	Intermediate round	—	—	4–0
2	(Castilla–La Mancha) Castile-La Mancha	2	1	0	1	3	3	0	3		0–2	—	—
3	Ceuta	2	0	0	2	1	7	−6	0		—	1–3	—

Source: RFEF
(H) Hosts

== Intermediate round ==
The intermediate stage was played as a single game at La Ciudad del Fútbol in Las Rozas de Madrid, on 12 February 2020.

Team 1	Score	Team 2
Basque Country	2–3	Galicia
La Rioja	0–4	Balearic Islands

== Final stage ==
The final stage will be played on 10 and 11 March 2020 at La Ciudad del Fútbol in Las Rozas de Madrid.

=== Bracket ===
Semifinals
10 March 2020
Galicia	4
Balearic Islands	1
10 March 2020
Extremadura	0
Andalusia	4

Final
11 March 2020
Galicia	2
Andalusia	0
