= 2023–24 Spanish stage of the UEFA Regions' Cup =

Tournament details
- Host country: Spain
- Dates: 8 December 2023 – 2024
- Teams: 19

Final positions
- Champions: Aragon (1st title)
- Runners-up: Galicia

The 2023–24 Spanish stage of the UEFA Regions' Cup is the 13th staging of Spanish stage of the UEFA Regions' Cup. The winners will qualify for the 2025 UEFA Regions' Cup.

This will be the first time since the 2007–08 edition, all the 19 teams will participate.

Galicia are the defending champions.

== Competition format ==
The 19 teams joined the preliminary round, played as mini-tournaments with three or four teams in each group, where only the first qualified team will advance to further stages. In this fist round, a penalty shoot-out will be played after every match, regardless of the result.

As new, all the group winners and the best second-placed teams will join the intermediate stage, consisting in a single-match game. The four winning teams will join the Final Four.

The draw of the first stage was held on 3 November 2023 at the headquarters of the Royal Galician Football Federation in Vigo.

== Preliminary stage ==
=== Group A ===
Matches were played at the Miguel Monleón stadium in Picassent, Valencian Community.

| Pos | Team | Pld | W | D | L | GF | GA | GD | Pts | Qualification | (La Rioja) | (Catalonia) | (Valencian Community) | (Navarre) |
|---|---|---|---|---|---|---|---|---|---|---|---|---|---|---|
| 1 | La Rioja | 2 | 1 | 1 | 0 | 5 | 2 | +3 | 4 | Intermediate round | — | — | 2–2 (3–4 p) | — |
| 2 | Catalonia | 2 | 1 | 1 | 0 | 1 | 0 | +1 | 4 | | — | — | — | 1–0 (4–5 p) |
| 3 | Valencian Community (H) | 2 | 0 | 2 | 0 | 2 | 2 | 0 | 2 | | — | 0–0 (4–5 p) | — | — |
| 4 | Navarre | 2 | 0 | 0 | 2 | 0 | 4 | −4 | 0 | | 0–3 (10–9 p) | — | — | — |

(H) Hosts

=== Group B ===
Matches were played at Estadio Nuevo Nalón, in El Entrego, Asturias.

| Pos | Team | Pld | W | D | L | GF | GA | GD | Pts | Qualification | (Asturias) | (Region of Murcia) | (Basque Country (autonomous community)) |
|---|---|---|---|---|---|---|---|---|---|---|---|---|---|
| 1 | Asturias (H) | 2 | 1 | 1 | 0 | 3 | 1 | +2 | 4 | Intermediate round | — | — | 2–0 (5–4 p) |
| 2 | Murcia | 2 | 0 | 2 | 0 | 3 | 3 | 0 | 2 | | 1–1 (5–4 p) | — | — |
| 3 | Basque Country | 2 | 0 | 1 | 1 | 2 | 4 | −2 | 1 | | — | 2–2 (5–6 p) | — |

(H) Hosts

=== Group C ===
Matches were played in Castile-La Mancha.

| Pos | Team | Pld | W | D | L | GF | GA | GD | Pts | Qualification | (Community of Madrid) | (Castilla–La Mancha) | (Melilla) |
|---|---|---|---|---|---|---|---|---|---|---|---|---|---|
| 1 | Madrid | 2 | 1 | 1 | 0 | 9 | 1 | +8 | 4 | Intermediate round | — | — | 8–0 (7–6 p) |
| 2 | Castilla–La Mancha (H) | 2 | 1 | 1 | 0 | 7 | 1 | +6 | 4 | Intermediate round | 1–1 (5–3 p) | — | — |
| 3 | Melilla | 2 | 0 | 0 | 2 | 0 | 14 | −14 | 0 | | — | 0–6 (1–3 p) | — |

(H) Hosts

=== Group D ===
Matches were played in Extremadura.

| Pos | Team | Pld | W | D | L | GF | GA | GD | Pts | Qualification | (Cantabria) | (Castile and León) | (Extremadura) |
|---|---|---|---|---|---|---|---|---|---|---|---|---|---|
| 1 | [[Cantabria {{{altlink}}}|Cantabria]] | 2 | 2 | 0 | 0 | 5 | 2 | +3 | 6 | Intermediate round | — | 3–2 (4–5 p) | — |
| 2 | Castile and León | 2 | 1 | 0 | 1 | 4 | 4 | 0 | 3 | | — | — | 2–1 (3–4 p) |
| 3 | Extremadura (H) | 2 | 0 | 0 | 2 | 1 | 4 | −3 | 0 | | 0–2 | — | — |

(H) Hosts

=== Group E ===
Matches were played in Galicia.

| Pos | Team | Pld | W | D | L | GF | GA | GD | Pts | Qualification | (Aragon) | (Galicia (Spain)) | (Canary Islands) |
|---|---|---|---|---|---|---|---|---|---|---|---|---|---|
| 1 | Aragon | 2 | 1 | 1 | 0 | 1 | 0 | +1 | 4 | Intermediate round | — | — | 1–0 (5–4 p) |
| 2 | Galicia (H) | 2 | 1 | 1 | 0 | 1 | 0 | +1 | 4 | Intermediate round | 0–0 (8–9 p) | — | — |
| 3 | Canary Islands | 2 | 0 | 0 | 2 | 0 | 2 | −2 | 0 | | — | 0–1 (4–2 p) | — |

(H) Hosts

=== Group F ===
Matches were played in Andalusia.

| Pos | Team | Pld | W | D | L | GF | GA | GD | Pts | Qualification | (Andalusia) | (Balearic Islands) | (Ceuta) |
|---|---|---|---|---|---|---|---|---|---|---|---|---|---|
| 1 | Andalusia (H) | 2 | 2 | 0 | 0 | 10 | 0 | +10 | 6 | Intermediate round | — | — | 7–0 (5–6 p) |
| 2 | Balearic Islands | 2 | 1 | 0 | 1 | 2 | 4 | −2 | 3 | | 0–3 (3–1 p) | — | — |
| 3 | Ceuta | 2 | 0 | 2 | 0 | 1 | 9 | −8 | 2 | | — | 1–2 (5–4 p) | — |

(H) Hosts

=== Ranking of second-placed teams ===
As Catalonia and Galicia are totally equalised, the last spot for the intermediate round would be decide by a draw. This draw was made on 14 December 2023, with Galicia being awarded as qualified team.

| Pos | Grp | Team | Pld | W | D | L | GF | GA | GD | Pts | Qualification |
|---|---|---|---|---|---|---|---|---|---|---|---|
| 1 | C | Castilla–La Mancha | 2 | 1 | 1 | 0 | 7 | 1 | +6 | 4 | Qualification for intermediate round |
| 2 | E | Galicia | 2 | 1 | 1 | 0 | 1 | 0 | +1 | 4 | Qualification for intermediate round |
| 3 | A | Catalonia | 2 | 1 | 1 | 0 | 1 | 0 | +1 | 4 | |
| 4 | F | Balearic Islands | 2 | 1 | 0 | 1 | 2 | 4 | −2 | 3 | |
| 5 | D | Castile and León | 2 | 1 | 0 | 1 | 4 | 4 | 0 | 3 | |
| 6 | B | Murcia | 2 | 0 | 2 | 0 | 3 | 3 | 0 | 2 | |

== Intermediate round ==
The intermediate stage was played as a single game, on 31 January 2024. The two second-qualified teams played their game away.

| Team 1 | Score | Team 2 |
|---|---|---|
| Asturias | 0–1 | Galicia |
| Cantabria | 1–3 | Castilla–La Mancha |
| Aragon | 2–1 | Madrid |
| Andalusia | 4–1 | La Rioja |

== Final stage ==
The final stage was played on 15 and 17 March 2024 at La Ciudad del Fútbol, in Las Rozas de Madrid.

=== Bracket ===
Semifinals
15 March 2024
Galicia (p) | 0 (5)
Castilla–La Mancha | 0 (4)
15 March 2024
Andalusia | 2 (1)
Aragon (p) | 2 (3)

Final
17 March 2024
Galicia | 1
Aragon | 2
