= 2017–18 Spanish stage of the UEFA Regions' Cup =

Tournament details
- Host country: Spain
- Dates: 8 December 2017 – 1 April 2018
- Teams: 18

Final positions
- Champions: Castile and León (3rd title)
- Runners-up: (Castilla–La Mancha) Castile-La Mancha

The 2017–18 Spanish stage of the UEFA Regions' Cup was the 12th staging of Spanish stage of the UEFA Regions' Cup. The winners qualified for the 2019 UEFA Regions' Cup.

Castile and León successfully defended their title.

== Competition format ==
The eighteen teams joined the preliminary round, played as mini-tournaments with three teams in each group, where only the first qualified team advanced to further stages.

The winners of groups A, B, C and D joined the intermediate stage while the winners of the groups E and F directly qualified for the semifinals.

== Preliminary stage ==
=== Group A ===
Pos	Team	Pld	W	D	L	GF	GA	GD	Pts	Qualification	(Galicia (Spain))	(Asturias)	(Cantabria)
1	Galicia	2	1	0	1	3	1	+2	3	Intermediate round	—	3–0	—
2	Asturias (H)	2	1	0	1	4	5	−1	3		—	—	4–2
3	[[Cantabria {{{altlink}}}|Cantabria]]	2	1	0	1	3	4	−1	3		1–0	—	—

Source: Futbolme
(H) Hosts

=== Group B ===
Pos	Team	Pld	W	D	L	GF	GA	GD	Pts	Qualification	(Castile and León)	(Canary Islands)	(Melilla)
1	Castile and León (H)	2	2	0	0	3	0	+3	6	Intermediate round	—	—	2–0
2	Canary Islands	2	1	0	1	1	1	0	3		0–1	—	—
3	Melilla	2	0	0	2	0	3	−3	0		—	0–1	—

Source: Futbolme
(H) Hosts

=== Group C ===
Pos	Team	Pld	W	D	L	GF	GA	GD	Pts	Qualification	(Catalonia)	(Extremadura)	(Navarre)
1	Catalonia (H)	2	1	1	0	10	1	+9	4	Intermediate round	—	9–0	—
2	Extremadura	2	1	0	1	3	10	−7	3		—	—	3–1
3	Navarre	2	0	1	1	2	4	−2	1		1–1	—	—

Source: Futbolme
(H) Hosts

=== Group D ===
Pos	Team	Pld	W	D	L	GF	GA	GD	Pts	Qualification	(Valencian Community)	(Andalusia)	(Region of Murcia)
1	Valencian Community (H)	2	2	0	0	5	2	+3	6	Intermediate round	—	3–1	—
2	Andalusia	2	1	0	1	7	4	+3	3		—	—	6–1
3	Murcia	2	0	0	2	2	8	−6	0		1–2	—	—

Source: Futbolme
(H) Hosts

=== Group E ===
Pos	Team	Pld	W	D	L	GF	GA	GD	Pts	Qualification	(Castilla–La Mancha)	(Community of Madrid)	(Ceuta)
1	(Castilla–La Mancha) Castile-La Mancha	2	1	1	0	2	1	+1	4	Final stage	—	1–0	—
2	(Community of Madrid) Madrid (H)	2	1	0	1	4	2	+2	3		—	—	4–1
3	Ceuta	2	0	1	1	2	5	−3	1		1–1	—	—

Source: Futbolme
(H) Hosts

=== Group F ===
Pos	Team	Pld	W	D	L	GF	GA	GD	Pts	Qualification	(Aragon)	(Basque Country (autonomous community))	(Balearic Islands)
1	Aragon	2	2	0	0	3	0	+3	6	Final stage	—	—	2–0
2	Basque Country (H)	2	1	0	1	4	1	+3	3		0–1	—	—
3	Balearic Islands	2	0	0	2	0	6	−6	0		—	0–4	—

Source: Futbolme
(H) Hosts

== Intermediate round ==
The first leg was played on 31 January 2018, while the second leg of the series between Valencian Community and Galicia was played on 14 February and the one between Castile and León and Catalonia, on 28 February.

Team 1	Agg.	Team 2	1st leg	2nd leg
Galicia	1–3	Valencian Community	1–2	0–1
Catalonia	3–3 (a)	Castile and León	3–1	0–2

== Final stage ==
The final stage will be played on 30 March and 1 April 2018 at Estadio Pedro Sancho in Zaragoza, Aragon.

=== Bracket ===
Semifinals
30 March 2018
Valencian Community	0 (2)
(Castilla–La Mancha) Castile-La Mancha (p)	0 (4)
30 March 2018
Aragon	0
Castile and León	1

Final
1 April 2018
(Castilla–La Mancha) Castile-La Mancha	0 (3)
Castile and León (p)	0 (4)
