= 2015–16 Spanish stage of the UEFA Regions' Cup =

Tournament details
- Host country: Spain
- Dates: 4 December 2015 – 27 March 2016
- Teams: 18

Final positions
- Champions: Castile and León (2nd title)
- Runners-up: Asturias

The 2015–16 Spanish stage of the UEFA Regions' Cup was the 11th staging of this tournament. The winners qualified for the 2017 UEFA Regions' Cup.

Castile and León won their second title.

== Competition format ==
The eighteen teams joined the preliminary round, played as mini-tournaments with three teams in each group, where only the first qualified team will advance to further stages.

The winners of groups A, B, C and D joined the intermediate stage while the winners of the groups E and F directly qualified for the semifinals.

== Preliminary stage ==
=== Group A ===
Pos	Team	Pld	W	D	L	GF	GA	GD	Pts	Qualification	(Andalusia)	(Cantabria)	(Basque Country (autonomous community))
1	Andalusia (H)	2	1	1	0	4	2	+2	4	Intermediate round	—	—	3–1
2	[[Cantabria {{{altlink}}}|Cantabria]]	2	0	2	0	3	3	0	2		1–1	—	—
3	Basque Country	2	0	1	1	3	5	−2	1		—	2–2	—

Source: RFEF
(H) Hosts

=== Group B ===
Pos	Team	Pld	W	D	L	GF	GA	GD	Pts	Qualification	(Extremadura)	(Valencian Community)	(Galicia (Spain))
1	Extremadura (H)	2	2	0	0	4	2	+2	6	Intermediate round	—	—	2–1
2	Valencian Community	2	1	0	1	4	2	+2	3		1–2	—	—
3	Galicia	2	0	0	2	1	5	−4	0		—	0–3	—

Source: RFEF
(H) Hosts

=== Group C ===
Pos	Team	Pld	W	D	L	GF	GA	GD	Pts	Qualification	(Asturias)	(Community of Madrid)	(Melilla)
1	Asturias (H)	2	2	0	0	3	0	+3	6	Intermediate round	—	—	1–0
2	(Community of Madrid) Madrid	2	1	0	1	2	2	0	3		0–2	—	—
3	Melilla	2	0	0	2	0	3	−3	0		—	0–2	—

Source: RFEF
(H) Hosts

=== Group D ===
Pos	Team	Pld	W	D	L	GF	GA	GD	Pts	Qualification	(Ceuta)	(Canary Islands)	(Aragon)
1	Ceuta (H)	2	1	1	0	3	1	+2	4	Intermediate round	—	3–1	—
2	Canary Islands	2	1	0	1	3	4	−1	3		—	—	2–1
3	Aragon	2	0	1	1	1	2	−1	1		0–0	—	—

Source: RFEF
(H) Hosts

=== Group E ===
Pos	Team	Pld	W	D	L	GF	GA	GD	Pts	Qualification	(Castile and León)	(Balearic Islands)	(Navarre)
1	Castile and León (H)	2	1	1	0	2	1	+1	4	Final stage	—	—	1–0
2	Balearic Islands	2	0	2	0	1	1	0	2		1–1	—	—
3	Navarre	2	0	1	1	0	1	−1	1		—	0–0	—

Source: RFEF
(H) Hosts

=== Group F ===
Pos	Team	Pld	W	D	L	GF	GA	GD	Pts	Qualification	(Castilla–La Mancha)	(Region of Murcia)	(Catalonia)
1	(Castilla–La Mancha) Castile-La Mancha	2	1	1	0	3	1	+2	4	Final stage	—	1–1	—
2	Murcia (H)	2	1	1	0	3	2	+1	4		—	—	2–1
3	Catalonia	2	0	0	2	1	4	−3	0		0–2	—	—

Source: RFEF
(H) Hosts

== Intermediate round ==
The play-off between Andalusia and Ceuta was played on 27 January and 10 February 2016, while the matches between Asturias and Extremadura were played on 10 and 24 February 2017.

Team 1	Agg.	Team 2	1st leg	2nd leg
Andalusia	3–4	Ceuta	3–2	2–0
Asturias	2–0	Extremadura	1–0	1–0

== Final stage ==
The final stage was played on 25 and 27 March 2016 in the Estadio Ciudad de Puertollano, Puertollano, Castile-La Mancha.

=== Bracket ===
Semifinals
25 March 2016
Ceuta	0
Asturias	1
25 March 2016
(Castilla–La Mancha) Castile-La Mancha	0 (1)
Castile and León (p)	0 (3)

Final
27 March 2016
Asturias	0
Castile and León	2
