= Spanish stage of the UEFA Regions' Cup =

- Founded: 1999
- Country: Spain
- Confederation: Europe (UEFA)
- Number of clubs: 19
- International cup: UEFA Regions' Cup
- Current champions: Canary Islands (1st title)
- Most championships: Castile and León (3 titles)
- Current: 2025–26 Spanish stage of the UEFA Regions' Cup

The Spanish stage of the UEFA Region's Cup is a biennial Spanish football tournament for amateur teams which represent the Spanish Autonomous Communities. Its winner qualifies for the next UEFA Regions' Cup, played the following year.

== History ==
The tournament was created in 1999, after the 1999 UEFA Regions' Cup where there was no qualifying tournament and Madrid represented Spain in the international contest (they eventually finished as runners-up).

It is contested by all 19 autonomous cities and communities, with Navarre the last territory to participate in 2005. Only amateur players between 18 and 35 years old, who never signed a professional contract, are eligible for this tournament.

== Finals ==
Years	Final host	Final			Losing semi-finalists (Note: No third place match is played; losing semi-finalists are listed in alphabetical order.)
Years	Final host	Winner	Score	Runner-up	Losing semi-finalists
1999–00	Aragon	Madrid	3–1	Andalusia	Aragon and Castilla–La Mancha
2001–02	Madrid	Asturias	0–0 (3–0 p)	Basque Country	Madrid and Murcia
2003–04	Madrid (Note: Neutral venue.)	Basque Country	3–1	Asturias	Galicia and Murcia
2005–06	Basque Country	Basque Country	0–0 (3–0 p)	Catalonia	Asturias and Castile and León
2007–08	Catalonia	Castile and León	2–2 (4–2 p)	Andalusia	Basque Country and Catalonia
2009–10	Galicia	Galicia	2–1	Andalusia	Balearic Islands and Canary Islands
2011–12	Asturias	Catalonia	2–1	Asturias	Castile and León and Murcia
2013–14	Castile and León	Catalonia	0–0 (5–4 p)	Andalusia	Castile and León and Murcia
2015–16	Castile-La Mancha	Castile and León	2–0	Asturias	Castilla–La Mancha and Ceuta
2017–18	Aragon	Castile and León	0–0 (5–4 p)	Castilla–La Mancha	Aragon and Valencian Community
2019–20	Madrid	Galicia	2–0	Andalusia	Balearic Islands and Extremadura
2023–24	Madrid	Aragon	2–1	Galicia	Andalusia and Castilla–La Mancha
2025–26	Catalonia	Canary Islands	1–0	Navarre	Catalonia and Galicia

=== Finalists ===
Team	Titles	Runners-up	Finalists
Castile and León	3 (2008, 2016, 2018)	–	3
Basque Country	2 (2004, 2006^{*})	1 (2002)	3
Catalonia	2 (2012, 2014)	1 (2006)	3
Galicia	2 (2010^{*}, 2020)	1 (2024)	3
Asturias	1 (2002)	3 (2004, 2012^{*}, 2016)	4
Madrid	1 (2000)	–	1
Aragon	1 (2024)	–	1
Canary Islands	1 (2026)	–	1
Andalusia	–	5 (2000, 2008, 2010, 2014, 2020)	5
Castilla–La Mancha	–	1 (2018)	1
Navarre	–	1 (2026)	1

* hosts

== Performance by team ==
C	Champion of the tournament
RU	Runner-up of the tournament
SF	Semifinalist of the tournament
IS	Eliminated in the intermediate stage
GS	Eliminated in the group stage

Team	2000	2002	2004	2006	2008	2010	2012	2014	2016	2018	2020	2024	2026
Andalusia	RU	GS	GS	GS	RU	RU	IS	RU	IS	GS	RU	SF	GS
Aragon	SF	GS	GS	GS	GS	GS	GS	GS	GS	SF	GS	C	IS
Asturias	GS	C	RU	SF	IS	GS	RU	GS	RU	GS	GS	IS	IS
Balearic Islands	GS	GS	GS	IS	GS	SF	GS	GS	GS	GS	SF	GS	GS
Basque Country	GS	RU	C	C	SF	GS	GS	IS	GS	GS	IS	GS	IS
Canary Islands	GS	GS	GS	GS	GS	SF	GS	GS	GS	GS	GS	GS	C
Cantabria	GS	IS	GS	GS	GS	GS	GS	GS	GS	GS	GS	IS	GS
Castile and León	GS	GS	GS	SF	C	IS	SF	SF	C	C	GS	GS	GS
Castilla–La Mancha	SF	GS	GS	IS	GS	GS	GS	GS	SF	RU	GS	SF	GS
Catalonia	GS	GS	GS	RU	SF	GS	C	C	GS	IS	GS	GS	SF
Ceuta			GS	GS	GS	GS	GS	GS	SF	GS	GS	GS	
Extremadura		GS	GS	GS	GS	GS	GS		IS	GS	SF	GS	GS
Galicia	GS	GS	SF	GS	GS	C	GS	GS	GS	IS	C	RU	SF
La Rioja		GS	GS	GS	GS						IS	IS	IS
Madrid	C	SF	GS	GS	GS	GS	GS	GS	GS	GS	GS	IS	GS
Melilla	GS	GS	GS	GS	GS	GS	GS	GS	GS	GS	GS	GS	
Murcia	GS	SF	SF	GS	GS	GS	SF	SF	GS	GS		GS	GS
Navarre				GS	GS				GS	GS	GS	GS	RU
Valencian Community	GS	GS	IS	GS	IS	GS	GS	GS	GS	SF	GS	GS	GS

== Performance in the UEFA Regions' Cup ==
Team	1999	2001	2003	2005	2007	2009	2011	2013	2015	2017	2019	~~2021~~	2023	2025	2027
Aragon			L8											C	
Asturias			L8												
Basque Country				C	L32										
Canary Islands															*
Castile and León						C				L8	L8				
Catalonia								RU	L32						
Galicia							L32					(Note: As the 2021 edition was suspended, Galicia was designed as Spanish representant of the 2023 edition.)	C		
Madrid	RU (Note: There was not national stage. Madrid was directly designed as Spanish representant.)	L8													

== See also ==
- UEFA Regions' Cup
- List of UEFA Regions' Cup qualifying competitions
