= Mario Sánchez (football manager) =

Spanish football manager (born 1983)

Personal information
- Full name: Mario Sánchez García
- Date of birth: 26 December 1983 (age 42)
- Place of birth: Salamanca, Spain

Team information
- Current team: Santa Marta (manager)

Managerial career
- Years: Team
- 1998–2010: Santa Marta (youth)
- 2010–2011: Santa Marta (assistant)
- 2011–2013: Santa Marta
- 2014–2020: Castile and León
- 2021–2024: Guijuelo
- 2025–: Santa Marta

Mario Sánchez García (born 26 December 1983) is a Spanish football manager who is in charge of Tercera Federación club Santa Marta.

== Career ==
Sánchez was born in Salamanca, Castile and León, and joined UD Santa Marta in 1998, as a manager of the Alevín squad. On 16 July 2011, after spending the previous campaign as an assistant manager, he was named manager of the first team in Tercera División.

Sánchez resigned from Santa Marta on 18 November 2013, due to "personal and labour reasons". The following 15 July, after having previously worked in the Royal Castile and León Football Federation as a manager of the youth sides, he was appointed in charge of the Castile and León autonomous football team.

Sánchez qualified Castile and León for the UEFA Regions' Cup for two consecutive tournaments (finishing fourth in the 2019 edition), after winning the Spanish stage on both occasions. On 15 June 2020, he left the RFCYLF.

On 30 June 2021, after more than a year without a club, Sánchez was appointed in charge of Tercera División RFEF side CD Guijuelo, after agreeing to a one-year contract. On 1 June of the following year, after achieving promotion to Segunda Federación, he renewed his link for a further season.

On 8 July 2023, after narrowly missing out a play-off spot in the campaign, Sánchez signed a new one-year contract extension with the Chacineros.

== Honours ==
Castile and León

- Spanish stage of the UEFA Regions' Cup: 2015–16, 2017–18
