= 2027 UEFA Regions' Cup =

Tournament details
- Dates: Qualifying rounds: 14 June – 27 November 2026; Final tournament: Spring 2027
- Teams: Final tournament: 8 Total: 34 (from 34 associations)

Tournament statistics
- Matches played: 47
- Goals scored: 220 (4.68 per match)
- Top scorer(s): (Bosnia and Herzegovina) Mirsad Šijerkić (Wales) Casey Coughlin (7 goals each)
- All statistics correct as of 21 November 2026.

The 2027 UEFA Regions' Cup is the 14th edition of the UEFA Regions' Cup, a football competition for amateur teams in Europe organized by UEFA.

Aragon from Spain are the title holders, defeating Lower Silesia in the final.

== Teams ==
A total of 34 teams entered the tournament. Any sides from Russia were barred from participation.

Associations were ranked according to their UEFA coefficients, computed based on results of the last three seasons (2019, 2023, 2025), to decide on the round their teams entered and their seeding pots in the preliminary and intermediate round draws. The top 31 associations entered the intermediate round, while the bottom 3 associations (ranked 32–34) entered the preliminary round.

The draw for the preliminary and intermediate rounds was held on 10 December 2025, at the UEFA headquarters in Nyon, Switzerland. The mechanism of the draws for each round was as follows:

- In the preliminary round, the three teams were drawn into positions in the single group without any seeding.
- In the intermediate round, the 31 teams were drawn into eight groups of four. Each group contained one team from Pot A, one team from Pot B, one team from Pot C, and either one team from Pot D or one team which advanced from the preliminary round (whose identity was not known at the time of the draw).

Qualified teams for 2027 UEFA Regions' Cup
Entry round	Rank	Association	Team	Qualifying competition	Coeff	Pot
Intermediate round	1	Spain	Canary Islands	2025–26 Spanish stage of the UEFA Regions' Cup	16.333	A
Intermediate round	2	Poland	Dolnośląski	2026 Polish stage of the UEFA Regions' Cup	15.000	A
Intermediate round	3	Czech Republic	Central Bohemian Region		13.667	A
Intermediate round	4	Serbia	Vojvodina		13.000	A
Intermediate round	5	Croatia	(Split, Croatia) Split		11.333	A
Intermediate round	6	Slovakia	Western Slovakia	Regional amateur team	9.667	A
Intermediate round	7	Portugal	Algarve		9.667	A
Intermediate round	8	Bosnia and Herzegovina	Zenica-Doboj		9.333	A
Intermediate round	9	Republic of Ireland	Munster		9.333	B
Intermediate round	10	Turkey	Istanbul	2026 Turkish stage of the UEFA Regions' Cup	9.333	B
Intermediate round	11	Finland	Järvenpää United	2026 Suomen Regions’ Cup	8.677	B
Intermediate round	12	San Marino	San Marino	National amateur team	8.333	B
Intermediate round	13	Italy	Piedmont-Aosta	Trofeo delle Regioni	8.333	B
Intermediate round	14	Bulgaria	South Western Bulgaria		7.667	B
Intermediate round	15	Hungary	Pest Region		7.333	B
Intermediate round	16	Wales	Tim Rhanbarthol y De	Regional amateur team	7.000	B
Intermediate round	17	England	Cheshire Football League	2025–26 FA Inter-League Cup	7.000	C
Intermediate round	18	Northern Ireland	NI Eastern		6.333	C
Intermediate round	19	Romania	The Carpathians		6.000	C
Intermediate round	20	Belarus	(Minsk) Uzda Region		5.667	C
Intermediate round	21	Israel	Hapoel Herzliya		5.500	C
Intermediate round	22	Slovenia	MNZ Ptuj		4.667	C
Intermediate round	23	North Macedonia	Bitola		4.167	C
Intermediate round	24	Georgia	FC Basa		4.133	C
Intermediate round	25	Malta	Malta	National amateur team	4.000	D
Intermediate round	26	Latvia	Zemgale	2025-26 Latvian Second League	3.333	D
Intermediate round	27	Moldova	Anenii Noi		3.333	D
Intermediate round	28	Kazakhstan	FC BKS Almaty	2025-26 Kazakhstan Second League	2.000	D
Intermediate round	29	Albania	Albania	National amateur team	2.000	D
Intermediate round	30	Sweden	Gothenburg		1.833	D
Intermediate round	31	Azerbaijan	Zangazur FC	2025-26 AFFA Amateur League	1.500	D
Preliminary round	32	Armenia	(Yerevan) Cilicia		1.500	1
Preliminary round	33	Estonia	Hiiumaa	Estonian Small Cup	0.000	1
Preliminary round	34	Lithuania	Tera		–	1

Associations which did not enter
Andorra	Austria	Belgium	Cyprus	Denmark
Faroe Islands	France	Germany	Gibraltar	Greece
Iceland	Kosovo	Liechtenstein	Luxembourg	Montenegro
Netherlands	Norway	Scotland	Switzerland	Ukraine

Banned associations
Russia

== Preliminary round ==
The group winner advanced to the intermediate round to join the 31 teams that received byes to the intermediate round.

Times are CEST (UTC+2), as listed by UEFA (local times, if different, are in parentheses).

=== Group A ===
Pos	Team	Pld	W	D	L	GF	GA	GD	Pts	Qualification
1	(Armenia) Cilicia (H)	2	2	0	0	7	0	+7	6	Advance to Intermediate round
2	(Lithuania) Tera	2	1	0	1	1	5	−4	3	
3	(Estonia) Hiiumaa	2	0	0	2	0	3	−3	0	

Source: UEFA
(H) Hosts
14 June 2026
17:00

Tera (Lithuania)	0–5	(Armenia) Cilicia
	Report	Kostenkov 53'; Allahverdyan 63'; Akulyan 65'; Yavryan 69', 87' (pen.)

FFA Academy Stadium, Yerevan
Referee: Eldorjan Hamiti (Albania)
17 June 2026
17:00

Hiiumaa (Estonia)	0–1	(Lithuania) Tera
	Report	Honcharenko 90'

FFA Academy Stadium, Yerevan
Referee: Miloš Gigovic (Bosnia and Herzegovina)
20 June 2026
17:00

Cilicia (Armenia)	2–0	(Estonia) Hiiumaa
Akulyan 26'; Kostenkov 65'	Report

FFA Academy Stadium, Yerevan
Referee: Volen Chinkov (Bulgaria)

== Intermediate round ==
The eight group winners advance to the final tournament. The winners of each group qualify for the finals, which in principle will be held in the last two weeks of June 2027, with the hosts to be decided when the qualifiers are known.

Times are CEST (UTC+2), as listed by UEFA (local times, if different, are in parentheses).

=== Group 1 ===
Pos	Team	Pld	W	D	L	GF	GA	GD	Pts	Qualification
1	(Bosnia and Herzegovina) Zenica-Doboj (H)	3	3	0	0	16	0	+16	9	Final tournament
2	(Wales) Tim Rhanbarthol y De	3	2	0	1	13	4	+9	6	
3	(North Macedonia) Bitola	3	1	0	2	5	14	−9	3	
4	(Armenia) Cilicia	3	0	0	3	3	19	−16	0	

Source: UEFA
Rules for classification: Tiebreakers
(H) Hosts
2 September 2026
13:00

Zenica-Doboj (Bosnia and Herzegovina)	8–0	(Armenia) Cilicia
M. Šijerkić 17', 55' (pen.), 65'; Selimović 19'; Tadić 50'; Jupić 68'; T. Šijerkić 81'; Hajdić 90+2'	Report

FA Training Centre, Zenica
Referee: Helgi Mikael Jónasson (Iceland)
2 September 2026
17:00

Bitola (North Macedonia)	0–7	(Wales) Tim Rhanbarthol y De
	Report	Jones 17'; Edwards 20'; Coughlin 38', 42', 83', 90'; Farrah 79'

Mladost Stadium, Kakanj
Referee: Vitālijs Spasjoņņikovs (Latvia)

5 September 2026
13:00

Zenica-Doboj (Bosnia and Herzegovina)	4–0	(North Macedonia) Bitola
Rapić 15'; Jupić 22'; Šijerkić 45'; Krehmić 88'	Report

FA Training Centre, Zenica
Referee: Helgi Mikael Jónasson (Iceland)
5 September 2026
17:00

Tim Rhanbarthol y De (Wales)	6–0	(Armenia) Cilicia
Coughlin 13', 58', 84' (pen.); Redhead 49'; Jones 68' (pen.); Cawley 79'	Report

Mladost Stadium, Kakanj
Referee: Miguel Nogueira (Portugal)

8 September 2026
12:00

Tim Rhanbarthol y De (Wales)	0–4	(Bosnia and Herzegovina) Zenica-Doboj
	Report	M. Šijerkić 10', 51', 65'; Kadušić 21'

FA Training Centre, Zenica
Referee: Miguel Nogueira (Portugal)
8 September 2026
12:00

Cilicia (Armenia)	3–5	(North Macedonia) Bitola
Kostenkov 13'; Yavryan 21', 37'	Report	Talevski 47'; Lisolajski 54', 78'; Alimovski 74'; Jovanovski 90+3'

Mladost Stadium, Kakanj
Referee: Vitālijs Spasjoņņikovs (Latvia)

=== Group 2 ===
Pos	Team	Pld	W	D	L	GF	GA	GD	Pts	Qualification
1	(Serbia) Vojvodina	3	3	0	0	13	0	+13	9	Final tournament
2	San Marino	3	1	1	1	5	5	0	4	
3	(Slovenia) MNZ Ptuj (H)	3	0	2	1	4	8	−4	2	
4	(Moldova) Anenii Noi	3	0	1	2	3	12	−9	1	

Source: UEFA
Rules for classification: Tiebreakers
(H) Hosts
15 October 2026
15:00

Vojvodina (Serbia)	5–0	(Moldova) Anenii Noi
Trpčević 3'; Adamović 45+1', 54', 64'; Krajinović 85'	Report

Stadion Videm, Videm pri Ptuju
Referee: Kadir Sağlam (Turkey)
15 October 2026
15:30

MNZ Ptuj (Slovenia)	1–1	San Marino
Krajnc 54' (pen.)	Report	Ramšak 85' (o.g.)

Ptuj City Stadium, Ptuj
Referee: Vitālijs Spasjoņņikovs (Latvia)

18 October 2026
15:00

San Marino	4–0	(Moldova) Anenii Noi
Ciacci 18'; Belward 65', 90'; Sartini 68'	Report

Ptuj City Stadium, Ptuj
Referee: Vitālijs Spasjoņņikovs (Latvia)
18 October 2026
15:30

Vojvodina (Serbia)	4–0	(Slovenia) MNZ Ptuj
Ivetić 7'; Adamović 59'; Petrović 63'; Krajinović 77'	Report

Stadion Hajdina, Hajdina
Referee: Fabio Verissimo (Portugal)

21 October 2026
15:00

San Marino	0–4	(Serbia) Vojvodina
	Report	Adamović 68', 74'; Ivetić 79'; Krajinović 84'

Stadion Hajdina, Hajdina
Referee: Kadir Sağlam (Turkey)
21 October 2026
15:00

Anenii Noi (Moldova)	3–3	(Slovenia) MNZ Ptuj
Bodolica 39'; Ipati 64' (pen.); Damaschin 90+1'	Report	Ljubec 25'; Markoli 31'; Ramšak 90+3'

Stadion Videm, Videm pri Ptuju
Referee: Fabio Verissimo (Portugal)

=== Group 3 ===
Pos	Team	Pld	W	D	L	GF	GA	GD	Pts	Qualification
1	(England) Cheshire Football League	3	2	1	0	8	6	+2	7	Final tournament
2	(Portugal) Algarve	3	2	0	1	11	6	+5	6	
3	(Finland) Järvenpää United	3	1	1	1	9	8	+1	4	
4	(Sweden) Gothenburg (H)	3	0	0	3	4	12	−8	0	

Source: UEFA
Rules for classification: Tiebreakers
(H) Hosts
7 September 2026
16:00

Algarve (Portugal)	4–1	(Sweden) Gothenburg
Calvinho 33'; Reis 71', 88'; Coelho 86'	Report	Ahlström 43'

Munkedals IP, Munkedal
Referee: Luca Cibelli (Switzerland)
7 September 2026
16:00

Cheshire Football League (England)	2–2	(Finland) Järvenpää United
Atherton 6'; Kinsella 84'	Report	Itäluoma 45'; Jrad 90'

Ivars Färg Arena, Henan
Referee: Novak Simović (Serbia)

10 September 2026
16:00

Algarve (Portugal)	2–3	(England) Cheshire Football League
Pereira 43'; Reis 78'	Report	Dixon 2', 33' (pen.); Atherton 10'

Ivars Färg Arena, Henan
Referee: Andrei Chivulete (Romania)
10 September 2026
16:00

Järvenpää United (Finland)	5–1	(Sweden) Gothenburg
Jrad 50', 72' (pen.); Dits 56'; Lainpelto 88', 90+1'	Report	Sjövall 40'

Munkedals IP, Munkedal
Referee: Novak Simović (Serbia)

13 September 2026
13:00

Järvenpää United (Finland)	2–5	(Portugal) Algarve
Uusaro 23'; Mäkinen 39'	Report	Rodrigues 13'; Reis 18'; Calvinho 34'; Coelho 66'; Teixeira 82'

Munkedals IP, Munkedal
Referee: Luca Cibelli (Switzerland)
13 September 2026
13:00

Gothenburg (Sweden)	2–3	(England) Cheshire Football League
La Carruba 31'; Sjövall 72'	Report	Dixon 13'; Hajri 61'; Payne 90+5'

Ivars Färg Arena, Henan
Referee: Andrei Chivulete (Romania)

=== Group 4 ===
Pos	Team	Pld	W	D	L	GF	GA	GD	Pts	Qualification
1	(Czech Republic) Central Bohemian Region	3	3	0	0	23	1	+22	9	Final tournament
2	South Western Bulgaria	3	2	0	1	16	5	+11	6	
3	(Kazakhstan) FC BKS Almaty	3	1	0	2	7	21	−14	3	
4	(Georgia (country)) FC Basa (H)	3	0	0	3	0	19	−19	0	

Source: UEFA
Rules for classification: Tiebreakers
(H) Hosts
14 October 2026
12:00

Central Bohemian Region (Czech Republic)	8–0	(Kazakhstan) FC BKS Almaty
Jakoubek 8'; Provod 11', 38', 47' (pen.); Pivetz 14'; Křemenák 33'; Havelka 75'; Soukup 90+2'	Report

GFF Rustavi Academy, Rustavi
Referee: Miloš Bošković (Montenegro)
14 October 2026
18:00

FC Basa (Georgia (country))	0–2	South Western Bulgaria
	Report	Fotirov 58'; Aleksov 90+2'

GFF Rustavi Academy, Rustavi
Referee: Gal Leibovitz (Israel)

17 October 2026
12:00

South Western Bulgaria	13–1	(Kazakhstan) FC BKS Almaty
Fotirov 6'; Paskov 22'; Cholev 24', 72', 77'; Evtimov 42' (pen.); Harris 45+2'; Sherif 50', 86'; Aleksov 53', 71', 90'; Valeriev 78'	Report	Sugurbayev 80'

GFF Rustavi Academy, Rustavi
Referee: Simon Bourdeaud'hui (Belgium)
17 October 2026
18:00

Central Bohemian Region (Czech Republic)	11–0	(Georgia (country)) FC Basa
Máca 16'; Křemenák 20', 71', 81', 82', 84'; Rittenauer 22', 45+1'; Soukup 61'; Křenek 66', 90+1'	Report

GFF Rustavi Academy, Rustavi
Referee: Miloš Bošković (Montenegro)

20 October 2026
15:00

South Western Bulgaria	1–4	(Czech Republic) Central Bohemian Region
Aleksov 49'	Report	Křemenák 6'; Provod 9', 35'; Máca 31'

Mikheil Meskhi Stadium, Tbilisi
Referee: Gal Leibovitz (Israel)
20 October 2026
15:00

FC BKS Almaty (Kazakhstan)	6–0	(Georgia (country)) FC Basa
Satkuzhayev 22'; Lebay 23'; Parkhatzhan 61'; Nagymet 72'; Batyrkhanov 75', 77'	Report

GFF Rustavi Academy, Rustavi
Referee: Simon Bourdeaud'hui (Belgium)

=== Group 5 ===
Pos	Team	Pld	W	D	L	GF	GA	GD	Pts	Qualification
1	(Spain) Canary Islands	3	3	0	0	8	1	+7	9	Final tournament
2	(Hungary) Pest Region	3	1	1	1	5	4	+1	4	
3	(Latvia) Zemgale (H)	3	1	1	1	5	4	+1	4	
4	(Israel) Hapoel Beit She'an	3	0	0	3	0	9	−9	0	

Source: UEFA
Rules for classification: Tiebreakers
(H) Hosts
2 September 2026
10:00

Hapoel Beit She'an (Israel)	0–2	(Hungary) Pest Region
	Report	Barabás 1', 80'

Football centre Rūpnīca, Riga
Referee: Denys Shurman (Ukraine)
2 September 2026
16:00

Canary Islands (Spain)	2–0	(Latvia) Zemgale
Machín 69'; Gonzalez 88'	Report

Football centre Rūpnīca, Riga
Referee: Ashot Ghaltakhchyan (Armenia)

5 September 2026
16:00

Pest Region (Hungary)	2–2	(Latvia) Zemgale
Török 52', 63'	Report	Krieviņš 7'; Sadovņikovs 55'

Football centre Rūpnīca, Riga
Referee: Ashot Ghaltakhchyan (Armenia)
6 September 2026
10:00

Canary Islands (Spain)	4–0	(Israel) Hapoel Beit She'an
Barcos 25' (pen.); Machín 37'; Diaz 52'; Deniz 90'	Report

Football centre Rūpnīca, Riga
Referee: Joni Hyytiä (Finland)

8 September 2026
10:00

Pest Region (Hungary)	1–2	(Spain) Canary Islands
Gulyás 47'	Report	Barcos 80', 89'

Football centre Rūpnīca, Riga
Referee: Joni Hyytiä (Finland)
8 September 2026
16:00

Zemgale (Latvia)	3–0	(Israel) Hapoel Beit She'an
Krieviņš 18'; Zuševics 56'; Laķis 83'	Report

Football centre Rūpnīca, Riga
Referee: Denys Shurman (Ukraine)

=== Group 6 ===
Pos	Team	Pld	W	D	L	GF	GA	GD	Pts	Qualification
1	Western Slovakia	3	2	1	0	9	3	+6	7	Final tournament
2	(Italy) Piedmont-Aosta	3	2	0	1	4	2	+2	6	
3	(Northern Ireland) NI Eastern	3	1	1	1	7	4	+3	4	
4	Albania (H)	3	0	0	3	2	13	−11	0	

Source: UEFA
Rules for classification: Tiebreakers
(H) Hosts
29 October 2026
12:00

NI Eastern (Northern Ireland)	0–2	(Italy) Piedmont-Aosta
	Report	Comino 2'; Geno 16'

Luz i Vogël Stadium, Luz i Vogël
Referee: Visar Kastrati (Kosovo)
29 October 2026
14:00

Western Slovakia	6–1	Albania
Palacka 25'; Gáborík 28'; Urban 37', 74'; Vass 43' (pen.); Michalec 76'	Report	Shehu 62'

House of Football, Tirana
Referee: Ion Orlic (Moldova)

1 November 2026
12:00

Western Slovakia	2–2	(Northern Ireland) NI Eastern
Vass 51' (pen.); Valo 55'	Report	Brown 5' (pen.); Dornan 39'

Luz i Vogël Stadium, Luz i Vogël
Referee: Olsid Ferataj (Albania)
1 November 2026
14:00

Piedmont-Aosta (Italy)	2–1	Albania
Redi 56'; Geno 90+1'	Report	Dajti 58'

Egnatia Arena, Rrogozhinë
Referee: Miloš Gigovic (Bosnia and Herzegovina)

4 November 2026
13:30

Piedmont-Aosta (Italy)	0–1	Western Slovakia
	Report	Hrenák 89'

Luz i Vogël Stadium, Luz i Vogël
Referee: Visar Kastrati (Kosovo)
4 November 2026
13:30

Albania	0–5	(Northern Ireland) NI Eastern
	Report	Dinu 25'; Mahoney 39'; Lavery 84'; McNeill 89'; Herron 90+1'

Egnatia Arena, Rrogozhinë
Referee: Miloš Gigovic (Bosnia and Herzegovina)

=== Group 7 ===
Pos	Team	Pld	W	D	L	GF	GA	GD	Pts	Qualification
1	(Poland) Dolnośląski	1	1	0	0	12	0	+12	3	Final tournament
2	(Turkey) Istanbul (H)	1	0	1	0	0	0	0	1	
3	(Romania) The Carpathians	1	0	1	0	0	0	0	1	
4	(Azerbaijan) Zangazur FC	1	0	0	1	0	12	−12	0	

Updated to match(es) played on 21 November 2026. Source: UEFA
Rules for classification: Tiebreakers
(H) Hosts
21 November 2026
10:00

Dolnośląski (Poland)	12–0	(Azerbaijan) Zangazur FC
Wąsiewski 2', 24'; Łazarowicz 5'; Puchala 8'; Sadowski 18'; Madej 32' (pen.); Bąk 47'; Niemienionek 72'; Maścianica 79', 87', 89'; Bohdanowicz 80'	Report

Arslan Zeki Demirci Sports Complex, Manavgat
Referee: Volen Chinkov (Bulgaria)
21 November 2026
13:00

The Carpathians (Romania)	0–0	(Turkey) Istanbul
	Report

Arslan Zeki Demirci Sports Complex, Manavgat

24 November 2026

Dolnośląski (Poland)	v	(Romania) The Carpathians
	Report

Arslan Zeki Demirci Sports Complex, Manavgat
24 November 2026

Istanbul (Turkey)	v	(Azerbaijan) Zangazur FC
	Report

Arslan Zeki Demirci Sports Complex, Manavgat

27 November 2026

Istanbul (Turkey)	v	(Poland) Dolnośląski
	Report

Arslan Zeki Demirci Sports Complex, Manavgat
27 November 2026

Zangazur FC (Azerbaijan)	v	(Romania) The Carpathians
	Report

Arslan Zeki Demirci Sports Complex, Manavgat

=== Group 8 ===
Pos	Team	Pld	W	D	L	GF	GA	GD	Pts	Qualification
1	(Republic of Ireland) Munster (H)	3	2	0	1	12	3	+9	6 (Note: Tied on head-to-head points, ranked on head-to-head goal difference: Munster: +1, Uzda Region: 0, Split: –1)	Final tournament
2	(Belarus) Uzda Region	3	2	0	1	7	4	+3	6	
3	(Croatia) Split	3	2	0	1	5	4	+1	6	
4	Malta	3	0	0	3	1	14	−13	0	

Source: UEFA
Rules for classification: Tiebreakers
(H) Hosts
Notes:
1 November 2026
15:00

Split (Croatia)	2–0	Malta
Bjeliš 56'; Prizmić 90+2'	Report

Knockgriffin Park, Midleton
Referee: Aaron Wyn Jones (Wales)
1 November 2026
20:30

Uzda Region (Belarus)	2–1	(Republic of Ireland) Munster
Abrazhevich 15'; Shalupenka 40'	Report	Dillon 90+2'

Turners Cross Stadium, Cork
Referee: Vilhjalmur Thorarinsson (Iceland)

4 November 2026
15:00

Split (Croatia)	2–1	(Belarus) Uzda Region
Andrić 3'; Jurić 33'	Report	Kaliada 85'

Knockgriffin Park, Midleton
Referee: Aaron Wyn Jones (Wales)
4 November 2026
20:30

Munster (Republic of Ireland)	8–0	Malta
Kilgannon 2', 70'; Crowley 14', 89', 90+2' (pen.); Tamen 45'; Hayes 54'; Abela 64' (o.g.)	Report

Turners Cross Stadium, Cork
Referee: Ioannis Christodoulou (Cyprus)

7 November 2026
16:00

Munster (Republic of Ireland)	3–1	(Croatia) Split
Casey 76', 90+4'; Conway 88'	Report	Čepo 70'

Turners Cross Stadium, Cork
Referee: Ioannis Christodoulou (Cyprus)
7 November 2026
16:00

Malta	1–4	(Belarus) Uzda Region
Cassar 41'	Report	Baranau 7', 28'; Montewka 11'; Karaliou 63'

Knockgriffin Park, Midleton
Referee: Vilhjalmur Thorarinsson (Iceland)

== Final tournament ==
The hosts of the final tournament will be selected by UEFA from the eight qualified teams. The eight teams will be drawn into two groups of four; the two group winners will meet in the final.

=== Qualified teams ===
The following teams qualified for the final tournament.

Team	Method of qualification	Date of qualification
(Bosnia and Herzegovina) Zenica-Doboj	Intermediate round Group 1 winners	9 September 2026
(Serbia) Vojvodina	Intermediate round Group 2 winners	21 October 2026
(England) Cheshire Football League	Intermediate round Group 3 winners	13 September 2026
(Czech Republic) Central Bohemian Region	Intermediate round Group 4 winners	20 October 2026
(Spain) Canary Islands	Intermediate round Group 5 winners	9 September 2026
Western Slovakia	Intermediate round Group 6 winners	4 November 2026
	Intermediate round Group 7 winners	
(Republic of Ireland) Munster	Intermediate round Group 8 winners	7 November 2026
