= Arsenio Arocha =

Spanish footballer and manager

Personal information
- Full name: Arsenio Arocha Guillén
- Date of birth: 22 August 1912
- Place of birth: Chimiche, Santa Cruz de Tenerife, Spain
- Date of death: 14 October 1990 (aged 78)
- Place of death: Guadarrama, Community of Madrid, Spain
- Position: Midfielder

Senior career*
Years	Team	Apps	(Gls)
1929–1933	CD Tenerife		
1933–1934	Real Madrid		
1934–1936	Real Betis		

Managerial career
- 1947–1948: RCD Córdoba
- 1950: Canary Islands autonomous football team (1)
- 1950–1951: UD Las Palmas
- * Club domestic league appearances and goals

Arsenio Arocha Guillén (22 August 1912 – 14 October 1990) was a Spanish footballer who played as a midfielder for Madrid FC and Real Betis, winning a Copa del Rey with the former in 1934 and a La Liga title with the latter in 1934–35. He was also known as Arocha II in order to be distinguished from his older brother Ángel Arocha. He later became a manager, taking charge over UD Las Palmas in 1950.

== Playing career ==
Born in Chimiche, Santa Cruz de Tenerife, Arocha began his football career at CD Tenerife, where he reached the highest levels in the football ranks of the Canary Islands at that time, becoming a part of the team that for many fans has been the best Tenerife side in its history, which was Champion of the Canary Islands in 1932 and that subsequently participated in the 1932 Spanish Cup.

This Tenerife team was made up of players who would soon confirm their category by being signed, most of them, by clubs from the first division, including Arocha, who was signed in 1933 by Real Madrid, where he had few chances. In fact, he only made two appearances for the club, both in the league, but despite this, he was still considered proclaimed champion of the 1934 Copa del Rey. Due to the difficulty in finding a place among the starting eleven, he decided to leave the club at the end of the 1933–34 season, and joined Real Betis, for whom he played until the outbreak of the Spanish Civil War in 1936, in which he sustained a combat wound that resulted in mutilation, thus ending his playing career.

== Managerial career ==
A few years after retiring, Arocha returned to football as a coach, taking over RCD Córdoba in the 1947–48 season and then UD Las Palmas in the 1950–51 season. When he was the coach of UD Tenerife in 1943–44, Arocha agreed to the request of Luis Molowny, then a boy, to have him play, and after observing his great aptitudes at the end of the training session, Arocha said: "If you wish, you can consider yourself a player for the youth team CD Tenerife", and in fact, Molowny triumphed that season as a youth forward and his move to the top team. While at the Canary Islands, he scouted for promising Canary players for Madrid and Atlético.

In January 1950, Arocha, then linked to Atlético Madrid, was chosen as the coach of the Canary Islands autonomous football team for a match against the powerful Argentinian team of San Lorenzo de Almagro, and he formed a Canarian XI made up of seven Gran Canarians, three Tenerifens and one Palmero, which also had the likes of Luis Molowny and Rosendo Hernández, and in the end, his selection and his leadership paid off as the Canaries won 4–2. Speaking of Molowny, it is claimed that Arocha was the one who recommended him to Real.

Outside football, he was a bank employee.

== Death ==
Arocha died in Guadarrama on 14 October 1990, at the age of 78.

== Honours ==
Madrid FC

- Copa del Rey:
  - Champions (1): 1934

Real Betis

- Copa del Rey:
  - Champions (1): 1935

== See also ==
- List of Real Madrid CF players
