= Sanchón de la Sagrada =

- municipality
- Coat of arms

- Location in Salamanca

- Location in Spain
- Coordinates: 40°44′41″N 6°01′29″W
- Country: Spain
- Autonomous community: Castile and León
- Province: Salamanca
- Comarca: Campo de Salamanca

Government
  - Mayor: Antonio Manuel Martín Hernández (Spanish Socialist Workers' Party)

Area
  - Total: 15 km^{2} (5.8 sq mi)
- Elevation: 863 m (2,831 ft)

Population (2025-01-01)
  - Total: 43
  - Density: 2.9/km^{2} (7.4/sq mi)
- Time zone: UTC+1 (CET)
  - Summer (DST): UTC+2 (CEST)
- Postal code: 37466

Sanchón de la Sagrada (Spanish pronunciation: [sanˈtʃon de la saˈɣɾaða]) is a municipality located in the province of Salamanca, Castile and León, Spain. As of 2016 the municipality has a population of 40 inhabitants.

== Notable people ==
- Nemesio Martín (1939–2022), first Spain national football team player from the Province of Salamanca
