= Javi Suárez =

Spanish association football player

Personal information
- Full name: Francisco Javier Suárez Lizano
- Date of birth: 31 January 1976 (age 50)
- Place of birth: Zaragoza, Spain
- Height: 1.82 m (5 ft 11 1/2 in)
- Position: Centre back

Team information
- Current team: Zaragoza (assistant)

Youth career
- Zaragoza

Senior career*
| Years | Team | Apps | (Gls) |
| 1994–1998 | Zaragoza B | 98 | (3) |
| 1998 | Zaragoza | 2 | (0) |
| 1998–1999 | Numancia | 9 | (1) |
| 1999–2000 | Binéfar | 32 | (1) |
| 2000–2003 | Cultural Leonesa | 100 | (12) |
| 2003–2004 | Logroñés | 36 | (2) |
| 2004–2005 | Recreación | 34 | (0) |
| 2005–2006 | Sant Andreu | 35 | (6) |
| 2006–2007 | Huesca | 37 | (3) |
| 2007–2009 | Granada | 66 | (9) |
| 2009–2010 | Ejea | | |
| 2010–2011 | La Muela | 35 | (5) |
| 2011–2012 | Sariñena | | |
| Total | | 484 | (42) |

International career
| 2006 | Aragon | 1 | (1) |

Managerial career
- 2017: Zaragoza B
- 2019: Ejea
- 2020–: Zaragoza (assistant)
- * Club domestic league appearances and goals

Francisco Javier "Javi" Suárez Lizano (born 31 January 1976) is a Spanish retired professional footballer who played as a central defender, and is the current assistant manager of Real Zaragoza.

== Club career ==
A Real Zaragoza youth graduate, Zaragoza-born Suárez made his professional debuts with its B-side in 1994. He made his first team – and La Liga – debut on 23 February 1998, coming on as a late substitute for Jesús García Sanjuán in a 1–2 away loss against Atlético Madrid.

Suárez moved to Segunda División side CD Numancia in July 1998, but was rarely used. He still managed to score his first professional goal for the side on 24 January 1999, netting his team's second in a 2–3 loss at Recreativo de Huelva.

Suárez would subsequently resume his career in Segunda División B and Tercera División, representing CD Binéfar, Cultural Leonesa, CD Logroñés, CD Recreación, UE Sant Andreu, SD Huesca, Granada CF, SD Ejea, CD La Muela and CD Sariñena; he retired with the latter in 2012, at the age of 36. At international level, he scored a last-minute winner for Aragon in a 1–0 friendly home win against Chile.

On 20 March 2017, as former Zaragoza teammate César Láinez was named manager of the first team, Suárez was appointed at the helm of the B-side in the fourth division. He left the club in June, after Láinez returned to the B-team.

On 25 June 2019, Suárez was appointed manager of third division side SD Ejea, but was sacked on 21 December after winning only six points out of 27. He returned to Zaragoza on 9 November of the following year, as Iván Martínez's assistant in the main squad.

== Managerial statistics ==
As of 10 November 2020

Managerial record by team and tenure
| Team | Nat | From | To | Record | | | | | | | | Ref |
| Team | Nat | From | To | G | W | D | L | GF | GA | GD | Win % | Ref |
|---|---|---|---|---|---|---|---|---|---|---|---|---|
| Zaragoza B | (Spain) | 20 March 2017 | 11 June 2017 | 10 | 6 | 2 | 2 | 23 | 6 | +17 | 60.00 | |
| Ejea | (Spain) | 25 June 2019 | 21 December 2019 | 18 | 5 | 5 | 8 | 21 | 23 | −2 | 27.78 | |
| Total | | | | 28 | 11 | 7 | 10 | 44 | 31 | +13 | 39.29 | — |
