= Balearic Islands Football Federation =

- Abbreviation: FFIB
- Formation: 1926
- Purpose: Football Association
- Headquarters: Palma, Mallorca
- Location: Balearic Islands, Spain
- President: Miquel Bestard
- Website: www.ffib.es

The Balearic Islands Football Federation (Catalan: Federació de Futbol de les Illes Balears, Spanish: Federación de Fútbol de las Islas Baleares; FFIB) is the football association responsible for all competitions of any form of football developed in the Balearic Islands. It is integrated into the Royal Spanish Football Federation and its headquarters are located in Palma de Mallorca and has offices in the capitals of the provinces.

== Competitions ==
- Men's
  - Tercera Federación (Group 11)
  - Regional Preferente (3 groups: Mallorca, Menorca and Ibiza/Formentera)
  - Primera Regional (1 group)
  - Segunda Regional de las Islas Baleares (1 group)
  - Tercera Regional de las Islas Baleares (2 groups: A and B)
- Youth
  - Liga Nacional Juvenil Group IX
  - Divisiones Regionales
- Women's
  - Divisiones Regionales

== See also ==
- Balearic Islands autonomous football team
- List of Spanish regional football federations
