= Pili Espadas =

Spanish footballer (born 1981)

Personal information
- Full name: María del Pilar Espadas Jurado
- Date of birth: 30 September 1981 (age 45)
- Place of birth: Spain
- Position: Striker

Senior career*
| Years | Team | Apps | (Gls) |
| 1999–2024 | Collerense | | |

International career
| 2004–2005 | Spain | 3 | (0) |
- Balearic Islands
- * Club domestic league appearances and goals

María del Pilar Espadas Jurado (born 30 September 1981) is a Spanish footballer who last played as a striker for Collerense.

== Career ==
Espadas has been regarded as one of the most important players of Spanish side Collerense and has been captain of the club.
