= Inés Herrera =

Spanish footballer (born 1978)

Personal information
- Full name: Inés Herrera Fernánez
- Date of birth: 18 October 1978 (age 48)
- Place of birth: Burgos, Spain
- Height: 1.76 m (5 ft 9 in)
- Position: Goalkeeper

Youth career
- CD Nuestra Señora de Belén

Senior career*
Years	Team	Apps	(Gls)
- CD Nuestra Señora de Belén
2002–2004	Levante		
2004–2013	Sevilla		

International career
2002	Spain	1	
- * Club domestic league appearances and goals

Inés Herrera Fernández is a Spanish football goalkeeper, currently playing for Sevilla FC in Segunda División.

She played in Primera División with Sevilla and Levante UD, with whom she won the 2004 Copa de la Reina.
