= League of Zenica-Doboj Canton =

Bosnia and Herzegovina football league

League of Zenica-Doboj Canton (Bosnian: Kantonalna Liga NSZDK) is a fourth level league in the Bosnia and Herzegovina football league system. The league champion is promoted to the Second League of the Federation of Bosnia and Herzegovina - Center.

== Member clubs ==
List of clubs competing in 2020–21 season:

- FK Borac Tetovo
- NK Čelik Zenica
- NK Fortuna Zenica
- NK Napredak Šije
- NK Nemila
- NK Novi Šeher
- NK Proleter Makljenovac
- NK Sporting Zenica
- NK Vareš
- NK Žepče
