= Nemesio Martín =

Spanish association football player

- Martín with Pontevedra

Personal information
- Full name: Nemesio Martín Montejo
- Date of birth: 31 December 1939
- Place of birth: Sanchón de la Sagrada, Spain
- Date of death: 20 October 2022 (aged 82)
- Place of death: Salamanca, Spain
- Height: 1.66 m (5 ft 5 in)
- Position: Forward

Senior career*
Years	Team	Apps	(Gls)
1962–1964	Salamanca	43	(18)
1964–1971	Pontevedra	175	(59)
1971–1972	Salamanca		
1972–1973	Pontevedra	32	(5)
1973–1976	Albacete	89	(47)
Total		338+	(129+)

International career
1965	Spain	1	(0)

Managerial career
- 1979–1980: Béjar
- 1980: Salamanca
- 1981–1983: Manchego
- 1983–1984: Jaén
- 1984–1985: Alavés
- 1985–1986: Pontevedra
- 1987–1989: Albacete
- 1989–1990: Alzira
- 1992: Salamanca
- 1992: Avilés Industrial
- 1993–1994: Yeclano
- 1995–1996: Lorca
- * Club domestic league appearances and goals

Nemesio Martín Montejo (31 December 1939 – 20 October 2022), also known as Neme, was a Spanish football player and manager.

A forward, he played 114 La Liga games and scored 35 goals for Pontevedra, as well as 135 games and 47 goals in the Segunda División for that club and Salamanca. He played one game for Spain in 1965.

Aside from a brief top-flight spell with Salamanca in 1980, his managerial career was mostly spent in lower leagues.

== Club career ==
Born in Sanchón de la Sagrada in the Province of Salamanca, Martín began his career at local Segunda División club Salamanca in 1962. Amidst interest from Atlético Madrid and Deportivo de La Coruña, he transferred to Pontevedra of the same league in 1964 for a fee of 4 million Spanish pesetas.

Pontevedra, who had just been relegated from La Liga, returned as champions of the 1964–65 Segunda División with Martín contributing 15 goals. On 9 October 1966, he scored the only goal of a win away to Barcelona at the Camp Nou; as of his death it was the club's only win over the Catalan club.

With 35 top-flight goals, 29 in the second tier and 8 in the Copa del Generalísimo, Martín's 72 goals put him third in Pontevedra's all-time goalscorers. While Pablo Couto and Charles scored more than him, neither played in La Liga.

In 1973, 33-year-old Martín joined Albacete. He was part of their squad that scored 111 goals in the Regional Preferente in 1974–75, netting the 100th of those. In three seasons in Castilla–La Mancha, he played 89 games and scored 47 goals.

Martín embarked on a managerial career in 1979 at Béjar Industrial. In July 1980, he was hired at top-flight Salamanca. He was fired in November, having only achieved two draws in eleven games. He returned to Pontevedra, then of the Segunda División B, for 1985–86; he was dismissed having won 9 and drawn 12 of 29 games; later in the decade he led another former employer, Albacete, in the same league.

== International career ==
On 8 December 1965, Martín played his only game for Spain, in a 2–0 friendly loss to England at the Santiago Bernabeu Stadium. He came on as a 35th-minute substitute for Carlos Lapetra, with Mundo Deportivo commenting "Lapetra was listless and rarely shone. He was replaced by Neme, who contributed nothing to the match".

He was the first person from his province to play for Spain, and as of his death, he was the only player capped for the country while at Pontevedra.
