= Castile and León autonomous football team =

National football team of Castile and León, Spain

Castile and León
- Nickname: Selección Castellano-leonesa
- Association: FCLF
- Head coach: Javier Yepes Peñas
First colours

First international
- Castile and León 1–1 Aragon (19 May 1998)

Biggest defeat
- Aragon 3–0 Castile and León (1 June 2002)

The Castile and León autonomous football team is its national football team. They are not affiliated with FIFA or UEFA, because it is represented internationally by the Spain national football team. It only plays friendly matches.

== Selected internationals ==
Date	Venue	Home team	Opponent	Score
19 May 1998	Castile and León	Castile and León	Aragon	1–1
1 June 2002	Aragon	Castile and León	Aragon	0–3

== Coaches ==
- Chus Pereda (1998)
- Juan Carlos Rodríguez (2002)
- Mario Sánchez García (2014–2020)

== Amateur team (UEFA Regions' Cup) ==
The amateur team of Castilla y León formed by players from the Tercera División and Preferente under 35 years, managed by Javier Yepes, have as biggest achievement the Spanish stage of the UEFA Regions' Cup in 2008. They qualified to and won the 2009 UEFA Regions' Cup, played in France.

Castile and León would repeat its title in the Spanish stage of the UEFA Regions' Cup in 2016, achieving the qualification to the 2017 edition of the European tournament.

=== UEFA Regions' Cup ===
	Venue		Opponent	Score
2001 UEFA Regions' Cup	Burgos	Castile and León	Basque Country	1–0
2001 UEFA Regions' Cup	Burgos	Castile and León	Asturias	0–0
2001 UEFA Regions' Cup	Burgos	Castile and León	Andalusia	0–0
2003 UEFA Regions' Cup	Badajoz	Castile and León	Extremadura	0–0
2003 UEFA Regions' Cup	Olivenza	Castile and León	(Community of Madrid) Madrid	1–3
2005 UEFA Regions' Cup	Gijón	Castile and León	Asturias	0–0
2005 UEFA Regions' Cup	Gijón	Castile and León	Balearic Islands	1–0
2007 UEFA Regions' Cup	Soria	Castile and León	Canary Islands	2–0
2007 UEFA Regions' Cup	Soria	Castile and León	La Rioja	2–0
2007 UEFA Regions' Cup	Vizcaya	Castile and León	Basque Country	1–1
2009 UEFA Regions' Cup	Soria	Castile and León	Murcia	4–1
2009 UEFA Regions' Cup	Soria	Castile and León	[[Cantabria {{{altlink}}}|Cantabria]]	3–2
2009 UEFA Regions' Cup	Tarragona	Castile and León	Basque Country	2–2
2009 UEFA Regions' Cup	Tarragona	Castile and León	Andalusia	2–2

== Notable players ==
Footballers, both men and women, born in Castile and León or who learned their football skills at a regional club in this region, who represented FIFA national teams.

- Álvaro Arbeloa (Sa)
- Armando Álvarez (L)
- Marianín Arías (L)
- Sergio Asenjo (P)
- (Morocco) Maryame Atiq (L)
- Rubén Baraja (V)
- Lola Benito (??)
- (Philippines) Alexia Blanco (V)
- (Equatorial Guinea) Jade Boho (V)
- Vicente del Bosque (Sa)
- Isacio Calleja (P)
- Julio Cardeñosa (V)
- Luis Cembranos (L)
- Gerardo Coque (V)
- (India) Saúl Crespo (L)
- Antonio de la Cruz (L)
- Patxi Ferreira (Sa)
- Gregorio Fonseca (V)
- Jorge de Frutos (Se)
- Celsa García (L)
- Luis García (Sa)
- (Equatorial Guinea) Rui da Gracia (Sa)
- (India) Matías Hernández (sa)
- Inés Herrera (B)
- Joseíto (Z)
- (Bosnia and Herzegovina) Elvir Koljić (V)
- Jesús Landáburu (P)
- Susana León (Z)
- Paco Llorente (V)
- (Cape Verde) Valdo Lopes (L)
- José Luis Manzanedo (B)
- Mariano Martín (P)
- Nemesio Martín (Sa)
- Juan Mata (B)
- (Switzerland) Adolphe Mengotti (V)
- José Mingorance (Z)
- Luis Minguela (Se)
- Felipe Miñambres (L)
- Adriana Nanclares (B)
- Chus Pereda (B)
- Cristina Prieto (V)
- Feliciano Rivilla (A)
- César Rodríguez (L)
- (Dominican Republic) Edipo Rodríguez (So)
- Juan Carlos Rodríguez (L)
- Eusebio Sacristán (V)
- Patricia Salvador (P)
- (Andorra) Aarón Sánchez (Sa)
- Saro (Note: Only played in three unofficial wartime international matches en 1937 and 1938: See Spain national football team results (unofficial matches).) (V)
- Luis del Sol (So)
- Luciano Sánchez ("Vavá II") (Sa)
- Sonia Vesga (B)
- (Equatorial Guinea) Benjamín Zarandona (V)
- (Equatorial Guinea) Iván Zarandona (V)

Ávila (1)	Burgos (6)	Palencia (5)	Segovia (2)	Soria (2)	Valladolid (14)
León (11)	Salamanca (9)	Zamora (3)			

Likewise, there are many other notable footballers with a deep Castilian or Leonese heritage, such as: Alain Giresse, Raúl González or Mathieu Valbuena.

== See also ==
- Category:Footballers from Castile and León
- Divisiones Regionales de Fútbol in Castile and León
