= Adrián Martín (footballer) =

Spanish footballer (born 1982)

Personal information
- Full name: Adrián Martín Cardona
- Date of birth: 10 October 1982 (age 44)
- Place of birth: Las Palmas, Spain
- Height: 1.85 m (6 ft 1 in)
- Position: Midfielder

Youth career
- 1991–2002: Las Palmas

Senior career*
Years	Team	Apps	(Gls)
2002–2004	Las Palmas B		
2004	Las Palmas	6	(1)
2004–2006	Real Madrid B	68	(7)
2006–2008	Murcia	14	(3)
2007–2008	→ Xerez (loan)	8	(2)
2008–2009	Levante	18	(3)
2009–2010	Jerez Industrial	17	(0)
2010	Teruel	10	(1)
2010–2011	Zamora	27	(7)
2011	Conquense	10	(0)
2012	San Fernando	13	(0)
2012–2013	Arcos	33	(7)
2013–2014	Cabecense	25	(6)
2014–2017	Guadalcacín	78	(12)
2017–2018	Xerez Deportivo	26	(1)
Total		353	(50)
- * Club domestic league appearances and goals

Adrián Martín Cardona (born 10 October 1982) is a Spanish former professional footballer who played as a midfielder.

== Club career ==
Martín was born in Las Palmas, Canary Islands. He first appeared as a professional in the 2003–04 season with UD Las Palmas in the Segunda División, switching to Segunda División B with Real Madrid's reserves Real Madrid Castilla in summer 2004 and achieving promotion with them at the end of his first season. On 6 December 2005, he played his only official game with the latter's first team, featuring the second half of a 2–1 away loss against Olympiacos F.C. in the group stage of the UEFA Champions League after coming on as a substitute for another cantera product, Javier Balboa.

From 2006 to 2008, Martín had second-division stints with Real Murcia CF and Xerez CD (the latter on loan), where he was rarely used. In July 2008, he signed a one-year contract with Levante UD in the same league, and subsequently resumed his career in the third tier.
