= Valencian Community Football Federation =

RFEF
- Founded: 1909
- Folded: 1919
- President: Vicente Muñoz Castelló
- Website: ffcv.es

The Valencian Community Football Federation (Valencian: Federació de Futbol de la Comunitat Valenciana, Spanish: Federación de Fútbol de la Comunidad Valenciana; FFCV) is the football association that has organized football competitions in the Valencian Community, Spain (provinces of València, Castellón, and, in most cases, Alicante) since 1909. Historically these have included the Valencian Championship and the Valencian Community autonomous football team but now focuses more on amateur football and youth levels, as well as futsal.

== History ==
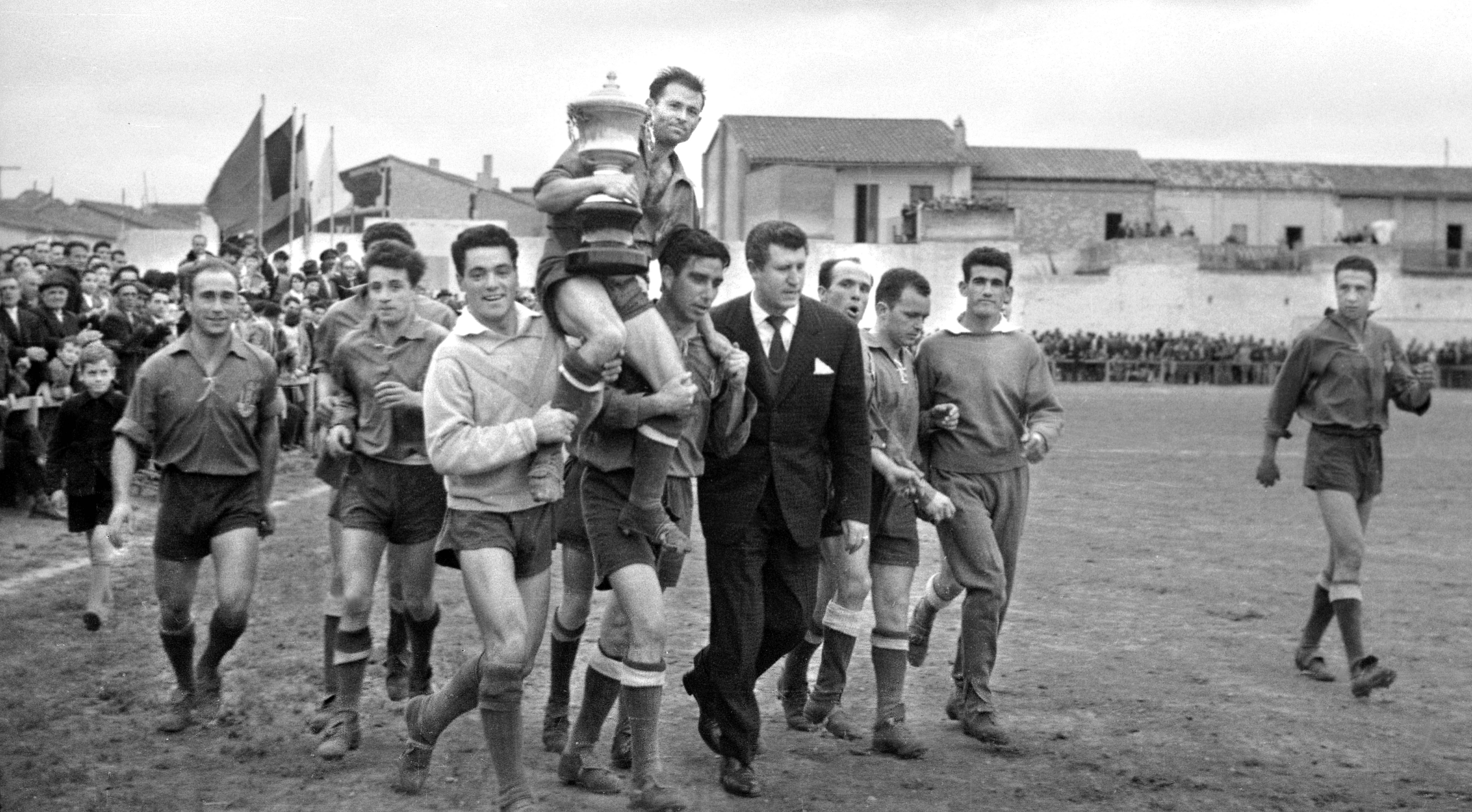
UD Alginet celebrating the Copa de l'Esportivitat in 1959

The Federación Regional Valenciana de Clubs de Football was founded on 7 September 1909, by Francisco Sinisterra, who was also the first president. The first clubs were Hispania, Rat Penat, Athletic Cabañal, Eureka, Real Club Regional, Universitario FC and Lucentum de Alicante, all of the city of Valencia with the exception of the latter. The first competition, the inaugural Regional Championship had been held back in June, within the framework of the Regional Exhibition.

From 1918 the Valencia football team also began to play matches, where players competing were active in clubs affiliated to the Federation itself. The selection of Valencia had an active life during the decades of the 1920s and 1930s, participating in tournaments and several friendly matches against other teams or clubs. Later, as other regional selections, they ceased operating in the 1940s.

In 1919 the Levantina Federation was created, which included clubs in the provinces of Castellón, Valencia, Alicante and Murcia. Thus, the regional tournament champions of Valencia & Murcia battled for a place in the Championship of Spain. However, in 1924, the federations split again (leading to the creation of the Region of Murcia Football Federation) and made the Federation Levantina extinct. Until the early 21st-century was known as Valencian Territorial Federation Cup.

Today the federation is the organizer of all football competitions in Valencia, ranging from Group VI of the Tercera Federación to the lower grades and youth leagues. The head office is in Valencia and has offices in Alicante, Castellón de la Plana, Alcoy, Alberic, Elche, Elda and La Vall d'Uixó.
