= 2015 UEFA Regions' Cup =

Tournament details
- Dates: 15 June 2014 – 4 July 2015
- Teams: 38 (from 38 associations)

Final positions
- Champions: (Republic of Ireland) Eastern Region (1st title)
- Runners-up: (Croatia) Zagreb
- Third place: (Turkey) Ankara (Germany) Württemberg

The 2015 UEFA Regions' Cup was the ninth UEFA Regions' Cup.

== Preliminary round ==
The draw for preliminary and intermediary rounds was carried out on 28 November 2013. It was conducted by the UEFA Youth and Amateur Football Committee chairman Jim Boyce.

The eight teams in the preliminary round have been drawn into two groups of four. Group A was played in Estonia, while Group B was played in Slovenia. Matches in the preliminary round were played between 23 and 27 July 2014 (Group A) and between 15 and 19 June 2014 (Group B). The two group winners advanced to the intermediary round.

=== Group A ===
Team	Pld	W	D	L	GF	GA	GD	Pts
(Sweden) IV Västergötland	3	2	1	0	12	3	+9	7
(Kazakhstan) Dostyk	3	2	1	0	7	2	+5	7
North Wales Coast	3	1	0	2	4	4	0	3
Northern Estonia (H)	3	0	0	3	1	15	−14	0

23 July 2014
15:00

Dostyk (Kazakhstan)	2–2	(Sweden) IV Västergötland
Borovski 33'; Akbarov 40'	Report	Schmidt 48'; J. Emanuelsson 82'

Rakvere linnastaadion, Rakvere
Referee: Radek Příhoda (Czech Republic)
23 July 2014
18:00

North Wales Coast	3–1	Northern Estonia
Midgley 68' (pen.); Parry 82'; Ryan Jones 89'	Report	Samberk 29'

Maarjamäe Stadium, Tallinn
Referee: Sergiu Derenov (Moldova)
25 July 2014
15:00

North Wales Coast	0–1	(Kazakhstan) Dostyk
	Report	Borovski 59'

Rakvere linnastaadion, Rakvere
Referee: Dag Vidar Hafsås (Norway)
25 July 2014
18:00

IV Västergötland (Sweden)	8–0	Northern Estonia
Ramic 22' 38'; Andersson 26' (pen.) 63' 77' (pen.); Lundborg 45'; Hellden 69' 90+2'	Report

Maarjamäe Stadium, Tallinn
Referee: Sergiu Derenov (Moldova)
27 July 2014
12:00

IV Västergötland (Sweden)	2–1	North Wales Coast
Ramic 49'; Abdu 61'	Report	Midgley 90+2' (pen.)

Rakvere linnastaadion, Rakvere
Referee: Radek Příhoda (Czech Republic)
27 July 2014
12:00

Northern Estonia	0–4	(Kazakhstan) Dostyk
	Report	Abutov 10' 56' 70'; Azhikhan 90'

Maarjamäe Stadium, Tallinn
Referee: Dag Vidar Hafsås (Norway)

=== Group B ===
Team	Pld	W	D	L	GF	GA	GD	Pts
East West Central Scotland	3	1	1	1	4	3	1	4
(Greece) Euboea	3	1	1	1	4	4	0	4
(Slovenia) Murska Sobota (H)	3	1	1	1	4	5	–1	4
San Marino	3	0	3	0	2	2	0	3

15 June 2014
17:30

Murska Sobota (Slovenia)	2–1	(Greece) Euboea
Sukič 53'; Čontala 83'	Report	Stamatakos 89'

Bakovci Stadium, Bakovci
Referee: Nikolai Yordanov (Bulgaria)
15 June 2014
17:30

San Marino	0–0	East West Central Scotland
	Report

Radenci Sports Park, Radenci
Referee: Petur Reinert (Faroe Islands)
17 June 2014
17:30

Murska Sobota (Slovenia)	1–1	San Marino
Čontala 66' (pen.)	Report	Mikhaylovski 7'

Bakovci Stadium, Bakovci
Referee: Lorenc Jemini (Albania)
17 June 2014
17:30

East West Central Scotland	1–2	(Greece) Euboea
Fletcher 11'	Report	Stamatakos 17'; Tsivikas 43'

Radenci Sports Park, Radenci
Referee: Nikolai Yordanov (Norway)
19 June 2014
17:30

East West Central Scotland	3–1	(Slovenia) Murska Sobota
Inglis 13' (pen.); Bradley 20'; Fotheringham 82'	Report	Contala 5'

Bakovci Stadium, Bakovci
Referee: Lorenc Jemini (Albania)
19 June 2014
17:30

Euboea (Greece)	1–1	San Marino
Vezirtzoglou 89'	Report	Della Valle 70'

Radenci Sports Park, Radenci
Referee: Petur Reinert (Faroe Islands)

== Intermediary round ==
The 30 teams which went straight through to the intermediary round were joined by the two group winners from the preliminary round. The 32 teams have been drawn into eight groups of four, with the following countries hosting each group's matches:

Group 1 – Croatia
Group 2 – Slovakia
Group 3 – Serbia
Group 4 – Hungary
Group 5 – Moldova
Group 6 – Malta
Group 7 – Bosnia
Group 8 – Poland

Matches in the intermediary round were played between 25 September 2014 and 24 October 2014. The winners of each group qualified for the final tournament.

=== Group 1 ===
Team	Pld	W	D	L	GF	GA	GD	Pts
(Croatia) Zagreb (H)	3	2	1	0	11	1	10	7
(Latvia) RTU Futbola Centrs	3	2	0	1	3	5	–2	6
(Sweden) IV Västergötland	3	1	1	1	9	6	3	4
(Azerbaijan) Chagirgan	3	0	0	3	5	16	–11	0

	(Azerbaijan)	(Croatia)	(Latvia)	(Sweden)
(Azerbaijan) Chagirgan		1–7	0–1	–
(Croatia) Zagreb	–		4–0	0–0
(Latvia) RTU Futbola Centrs	–	–		2–1
(Sweden) IV Västergötland	8–4	–	–	

=== Group 2 ===
Team	Pld	W	D	L	GF	GA	GD	Pts
(Germany) Württemberg	3	3	0	0	10	1	+9	9
Eastern Slovakia (H)	3	2	0	1	4	2	+2	6
(England) Isle of Man	3	1	0	2	2	8	–6	3
East West Central Scotland	3	0	0	3	0	5	–5	0

23 September 2014

Württemberg (Germany)	2–1	Eastern Slovakia
Marinić 13'; Wiest 82'		Jurč 85'

National Training Centre, Poprad
Referee: Aleksandr Gauzer (Kazakhstan)
23 September 2014

Isle of Man (England)	2–0	East West Central Scotland
Josh Kelly 5'; McKnulty 42'

National Training Centre, Poprad
Referee: Denis Scherbakov (Belarus)
25 September 2014

Württemberg (Germany)	7–0	(England) Isle of Man
Kleinschrodt 20'; Asch 37', 85'; Wiest 60', 61'; Marinić 80', 87'

National Training Centre, Poprad
Referee: Ville Nevalainen (Finland)
25 September 2014

East West Central Scotland	0–2	Eastern Slovakia
		Kiššák 45+1'; Pončák 51'

National Training Centre, Poprad
Referee: Aleksandr Gauzer (Kazakhstan)
27 September 2014

East West Central Scotland	0–1	(Germany) Württemberg
		Kleinschrodt 21'

Stadium Velka, Poprad
Referee: Denis Scherbakov (Belarus)
27 September 2014

Eastern Slovakia	1–0	(England) Isle of Man
Bilas 81'

National Training Centre, Poprad
Referee: Ville Nevalainen (Finland)

=== Group 3 ===
Team	Pld	W	D	L	GF	GA	GD	Pts
(Czech Republic) South Moravia	3	2	1	0	5	1	4	7
(Serbia) Vojvodina (H)	3	1	1	1	5	5	0	4
South-West Bulgaria	3	1	0	2	3	6	–3	3
(Switzerland) Vaud	3	0	2	1	3	4	–1	2

	(Serbia)	(Bulgaria)	(Switzerland)	(Czech Republic)
(Serbia) Vojvodina		3–0	2–2	–
South-West Bulgaria	–		2–1	–
(Switzerland) Vaud	–	–		0–0
(Czech Republic) South Moravia	3–0	2–1	–	

=== Group 4 ===
Team	Pld	W	D	L	GF	GA	GD	Pts
(Republic of Ireland) Eastern Region	3	3	0	0	11	2	9	9
East Hungary (H)	3	2	0	1	6	5	1	6
(Israel) F.C. Karmiel Safed	3	1	0	2	2	4	–2	3
(Lithuania) FK Nevėžis	3	0	0	3	3	11	–8	0

	(Republic of Ireland)	(Hungary)	(Lithuania)	(Israel)
(Republic of Ireland) Eastern Region		4–1	6–1	–
East Hungary	–		3–1	–
(Lithuania) FK Nevėžis	–	–		1–2
(Israel) F.C. Karmiel Safed	0–1	0–2	–	

=== Group 5 ===
Team	Pld	W	D	L	GF	GA	GD	Pts
(Northern Ireland) Eastern Region	3	3	0	0	10	1	+9	9
(Spain) Catalonia	3	2	0	1	14	1	+13	6
(Ukraine) AF Piatykhatska	3	1	0	2	5	8	–3	3
(Moldova) Telenești (H)	3	0	0	3	1	20	–19	0

23 September 2014

AF Piatykhatska (Ukraine)	0–4	(Spain) Catalonia
		Garrós 26', 63'; Batanero Puigbó 82'; Aumatell Sanglas 90+3'

Zimbru 2, Chișinău
Referee: Marco Borg (Malta)
23 September 2014

Eastern Region (Northern Ireland)	5–1	(Moldova) Telenești
Steve Murray 24', 65'; Richard Thompson 38', 76'; Eamon Kelly 69'		Gheorghe Rotaru 45+3' (pen.)

Stadionul CPSN, Vadul lui Vodă
Referee: Vadims Direktorenko (Latvia)
25 September 2014

AF Piatykhatska (Ukraine)	0–4	(Northern Ireland) Eastern Region

CSR Orhei, Orhei
Referee: Zaven Hovhannisyan (Armenia)
25 September 2014

Telenești (Moldova)	0–10	(Spain) Catalonia

Stadionul CPSN, Vadul lui Vodă
Referee: Vadims Direktorenko (Latvia)
27 September 2014

Telenești (Moldova)	0–5	(Ukraine) AF Piatykhatska

Stadionul CPSN, Vadul lui Vodă
Referee: Marco Borg (Malta)
27 September 2014

Catalonia (Spain)	0–1	(Northern Ireland) Eastern Region

Dinamo-Auto Stadium, Tîrnauca
Referee: Zaven Hovhannisyan (Armenia)

=== Group 6 ===
Team	Pld	W	D	L	GF	GA	GD	Pts
(Turkey) Ankara	3	3	0	0	5	2	3	9
South Region Russia	3	2	0	1	5	3	2	6
(Malta) Gozo (H)	3	1	0	2	4	5	–1	3
(Finland) Vaasa	3	0	0	3	0	4	–4	0

	(Turkey)	(Russia)	(Malta)	(Finland)
(Turkey) Ankara		2–1	2–1	–
South Region Russia	–		3–1	–
(Malta) Gozo	–	–		2–0
(Finland) Vaasa	0–1	0–1	–	

=== Group 7 ===
Team	Pld	W	D	L	GF	GA	GD	Pts
(Bosnia and Herzegovina) Tuzla Canton (H)	3	3	0	0	7	3	+4	6
(Italy) Lazio	3	2	0	1	4	2	+2	3
(Portugal) Leiria	3	1	0	2	5	4	+1	3
(Belarus) ALF-2007 Minsk	3	0	0	3	1	8	–5	0

	(Italy)	(Portugal)	(Bosnia and Herzegovina)	(Belarus)
(Italy) Lazio		1–0	1–2	–
(Portugal) Leiria	–		1–3	–
(Bosnia and Herzegovina) Tuzla Canton	–	–		2–1
(Belarus) ALF-2007 Minsk	0–2	0–4	–	

=== Group 8 ===
Team	Pld	W	D	L	GF	GA	GD	Pts
(Poland) Lower Silesia (H)	3	2	1	0	11	4	+7	7
Paris Île-de-France	3	2	1	0	6	1	+5	7
(North Macedonia) FYR Macedonia	3	0	1	2	3	8	–5	1
(Romania) Brașov	3	0	1	2	4	11	–7	1

13 September 2014

Brașov (Romania)	2–5	(Poland) Lower Silesia
Vasilache 52' (pen.); David 76'	Report	Babeczko 25'; Leśniarek 45+1'; Niedojad 78', 87'; Gołębiewski 90+2'

Stadion Miejski w Legnicy, Legnica
Referee: Bardhyl Pashaj (Albania)
13 September 2014

Paris Île-de-France	1–0	(North Macedonia) FYR Macedonia
Harel 32'

Stadion KS Polkowice, Polkowice
Referee: Georgi Vadachkoria (Georgia)
15 September 2014

FYR Macedonia (North Macedonia)	1–5	(Poland) Lower Silesia
Karceski 90'		Gacek 9', 37'; Budny 15'; Leśniarek 45' (pen.); Shakjiri 88' (o.g.)

Stadion Miejski w Legnicy, Legnica
Referee: Georgi Vadachkoria (Georgia)
15 September 2014

Brașov (Romania)	0–4	Paris Île-de-France
		Honore 14'; Harel 22' (pen.), 27', 58'

Stadion KS Polkowice, Polkowice
Referee: Domagoj Vučkov (Croatia)
17 September 2014

Lower Silesia (Poland)	1–1	Paris Île-de-France
Leśniarek 31'		Mokrane 84'

Stadion Miejski w Legnicy, Legnica
Referee: Domagoj Vučkov (Croatia)
17 September 2014

FYR Macedonia (North Macedonia)	2–2	(Romania) Brașov
Shakjiri 17'; Paunov 33'		Dascalu 81'; Vasilache 83'

Stadion Zagłębia Lubin, Lubin
Referee: Bardhyl Pashaj (Albania)

== Final tournament ==
The final tournament was held in the Republic of Ireland, with the final game scheduled for 4 July 2015.

The draw took place at Dublin Arena on 30 March.

=== Group A ===
Team	Pld	W	D	L	GF	GA	GD	Pts
(Republic of Ireland) Eastern Region (H)	3	3	0	0	6	1	+5	9
(Turkey) Ankara	3	2	0	1	6	5	+1	6
(Czech Republic) South Moravia	3	1	0	2	3	6	−3	3
(Bosnia and Herzegovina) Tuzla	3	0	0	3	2	5	−3	0

=== Group B ===
Team	Pld	W	D	L	GF	GA	GD	Pts
(Croatia) Zagreb	3	3	0	0	9	2	+7	9
(Germany) Württemberg	3	1	1	1	4	4	0	4
(Northern Ireland) Eastern Region	3	1	1	1	5	6	−1	4
(Poland) Lower Silesia	3	0	0	3	1	7	−6	0

=== Final ===
4 July 2015
16:00 IST

Eastern Region (Republic of Ireland)	1–0	(Croatia) Zagreb
David Lacey 10'	Report

Tallaght Stadium, Dublin
Referee: Nikolaj Hänni (Switzerland)

== See also ==
- UEFA Regions' Cup
