= Ceuta Football Federation =

Football Association

- Founded: 13 january 1931
- President: Antonio García Gaona
- Website: www.ffce.es

The Ceuta Football Federation (Spanish: Federación de Fútbol de Ceuta; RFFCE) is responsible for administering football in the Autonomous City of Ceuta. They are not directly affiliated with FIFA or CAF or UEFA. Till now there has been no attempt to select a team to represent the whole Spanish exclave in North Africa.

88 football clubs are administered in Ceuta and also the amateur autonomous team that plays the Spanish stage of the UEFA Regions' Cup.

At the autonomous community level (5th tier) of the Spanish football league system below the national competitions controlled by the Royal Spanish Football Federation, clubs from Ceuta are placed along with those from Western Andalusia in Group 10 of the Tercera Federación rather than in their own group, but at the 6th level, the city has its own league, the Preferente of Ceuta.
