= Extremadura autonomous football team =

Regional football team for Extremadura, Spain

Extremadura
- Association: Federación Territorial Extremeña de Fútbol
- Head coach: Manuel Sanchéz
- Top scorer: Rai Ortega (2)
- Home stadium: Estadio Nuevo Vivero
First colours

First international
- Extremadura 2–1 Equatorial Guinea (Badajoz, Extremadura; 28 December 2007)

Biggest win
- Extremadura 2–1 Equatorial Guinea (Badajoz, Extremadura; 28 December 2007)

The Extremadura autonomous football team is the regional football team for Extremadura, Spain. It is not affiliated with FIFA or UEFA, because it is represented internationally by the Spain national football team. It plays only friendly matches. The creation of an Extremadura national team was promoted by César Sánchez (a former Valencia CF and Real Madrid goalkeeper), with the support of the Extremaduran Football Federation.

== History ==
Although the national team of Extremadura was only officially created in 2007, the presence of an Extremadura national team had already been announced 10 years earlier, on 18 November 1997, in a tribute match to the victims of the 1997 flood in Badajoz, in which a team made up of the best players from Extremadura (CD Badajoz, CF Extremadura and CP Mérida) at that time faced the soon to be Champions league winners Real Madrid at the Viejo Vivero. After a respectful minute of silence to pay tribute to all those victims of the flood, the kick-off was given by the 40-year-old Rafael Gordillo and the match ended 0–2 in favor of Madrid, thanks to goals from Extremaduran Fernando Morientes, and Dani from the penalty spot. The amount that was managed to collect that day amounted to 100 million pesetas, between the tickets, the anonymous donations, and that of the footballers themselves. The likes of Carlos Montoya, David Cortés, Pirri and Ángel Cuéllar lined-up for Extremadura that day.

The idea to create an Extremeña Football Team gained widespread attention when former Real Madrid goalkeeper César Sánchez supported such proposals in August 2007, showing his enthusiasm for the creation of the team, and these statements were the trigger for the launch of the project, which also had the support of "Cáceres 2016" and "Marca Extremadura". The Extremadura national team played their first international game four months later, on 28 December 2007, at the Nuevo Vivero stadium in Badajoz, debuting against Equatorial Guinea, a former Spanish colony who was among the 100 best teams in the FIFA ranking, and who had just faced a fellow regional selection of Spain, Murcia. This meeting was projected to become a sports festival (thus being animated by numerous musical performances) and as a measure of promotion of football in the region. It should also be noted that the honorary kick-off was carried out by the girls from the Extremaduran Women's Football 7-a-side National Team who had been proclaimed champions of Spain on 8 December 2007, in Valencia after defeating Andalusia 1–0. The game ended in a 2–1 win with goals from Luismi and Enrique.

They played their last game in the following year, on 27 December 2008, against Peru, in a thrilling match that was not decided until the last minute. On a rainy and cold afternoon, the players from Extremadura did not want to disappoint the around 2,500 spectators who had gathered at the Príncipe Felipe in Cáceres, and although the rival took the lead twice via Junior Ross and Pedro García, Extremadura managed to equalizer both times thanks to substitute Rai, with his second of the night coming just moments before the final whistle after converting a penalty that was much discussed by the Peruvian players.

== Selected internationals ==
18 November 1997 Tribute match	Extremadura	0–2	(Spain) Real Madrid	Badajoz
		Report	Morientes; Dani	Stadium: Viejo Vivero; Referee: Carmona Méndez

28 December 2007 Friendly	Extremadura	2–1	Equatorial Guinea	Badajoz
20:30 CET	Luismi 14'; Enrique 24'	Report	Juvenal 45'	Stadium: Nuevo Vivero; Referee: Ceballos Silva

27 December 2008 Friendly	Extremadura	2–2	Peru	Cáceres
20:30 CET	Rai 70', 90+6'	Report	Junior Ross 25'; Pedro García 75'	Stadium: Príncipe Felipe; Referee: Andrés Ceballos

== Notable players ==
- (Spain) Iván Cuéllar
- (Spain) Rai

== See also ==
- Category:Footballers from Extremadura
