= Valencian Community autonomous football team =

Valencian Community
- Nickname: Selecció Valenciana
- Association: Valencian Football Federation
First colours

First international
- Valencian Community 5–0 Aragon (Valencian Community; 12 June 1918)

Biggest win
- Valencian Community 5–0 Aragon (Valencian Community; 12 June 1918)

Biggest defeat
- Andalusia 4–1 Valencian Community (Jaén, Andalusia; 8 January 1928)

The Valencian National football team is the national football team for the Valencian Community, Spain. They are not affiliated with FIFA or UEFA, because it is represented internationally by the Spain national football team. It only plays friendly matches, and has not organised a fixture since 2006.

== History ==
Historically, the Valencian team has had two well-differentiated periods: the time of the regional team, during which it faced other regional teams (1918-1944) and the time of the regional team, during which it faced six national A teams.

The Valencian football team made their debut against the South team on 19 November 1922 at the Campo de Algirós, in the quarter-finals of the 1922–23 Copa del Príncipe de Asturias, an official tournament organised by RFEF, and they lost 1-2. Eduardo Cubells was the author of the first goal in the history of the team. In the following edition of the Prince of Asturias Cup, the Valencian team played their second ever game, again against the South team, and again losing, this time 3-2, and also again Cubells was the author of Valencia's consolation goals, although some sources list Arturo Montesinos as the goalscorer of Valencia's second goal.

They had to wait 13 years for their first victory, when on 15 November 1936, they defied the expectations by defeating Catalonia by the incredible score of 4-0 at the Mestalla Stadium, thanks to braces from Severiano Goiburu and Langarita.

== Matches played ==
=== Historic fixtures ===
Date	Home team	Opponent	Score
12 June 1918	(Valencian Community) Land of Valencia	Aragon	5–0
13 June 1918	(Valencian Community) Land of Valencia	Aragon	3–0

19 November 1922 1922–23 Prince of Asturias Cup quarter-finals	(Note: the Levante (Valencian Federation) team.)Valencian Community	1–2	Andalusia (Note: the Sur (South Federation) team.)	Valencia, Valencian Community
	Cubells 60' (pen.)	Report	Kinké 30'; León 32'	Stadium: Campo de Algirós; Referee: (Catalonia) Enrique Peris

11 November 1923 1923–24 Prince of Asturias Cup quarter-finals	Valencian Community	2–3	Andalusia	Valencia, Valencian Community
	Cubells 38', 60'	Report; Report	Brand 10'; Kinké 15'; Spencer 80'	Stadium: Mestalla Stadium; Referee: (Community of Madrid) Luis Colina
Note: In some sources Arturo Montesinos is listed as the goalscorer of Valencia's second goal.

8 January 1928 Friendly	Andalusia	4–1	Valencian Community	Jaén, Andalusia
		Report

18 October 1936 Friendly	Catalonia	2–0	Valencian Community	Barcelona, Catalonia
	Betancourt 15'; Juan Ramón 63' (o.g.)			Stadium: Camp de Les Corts

15 November 1936 Friendly	Valencian Community	4–0	Catalonia	Valencia, Valencian Community
	Goiburu; Langarita			Stadium: Mestalla Stadium; Referee: Tamarit

27 March 1944 Friendly	Valencian Community	3–4	Catalonia	Valencia, Valencian Community
	Epi; Igoa; Gorostiza		Valle; Martín; César	Stadium: Mestalla Stadium; Referee: Tamarit

23 April 1944 Friendly	Catalonia	2–2	Valencian Community	Barcelona, Catalonia
	Bravo; Martín (pen.)	Report	Pasieguito; Gorostiza	Stadium: Camp de Les Corts

- The team also played matches against the leading club in the region, Valencia CF, five times in the 1930s and 40s and one in 1996.

=== Recent fixtures ===
28 December 2001 Friendly	Valencian Community	4–1	Lithuania

27 December 2002 Friendly	Valencian Community	1–2	FR Yugoslavia	Valencia, Valencian Community
	V. Moreno 11'	Report	Mijatovic 5'; Ljuboja 62'	Stadium: Mestalla; Attendance: 15,000; Referee: M. A. Ayza Gámez

27 December 2003 Friendly	Valencian Community	1–0	Cameroon	Castellón de la Plana
	J. Moreno 11'	Report		Stadium: Nou Estadi Castàlia; Attendance: 3,000; Referee: V. Lizondo Cortés

28 December 2004 Friendly	Valencian Community	1–2	Bulgaria	Valencia, Valencian Community
	Javi Moreno 90' (penalty missed)	Report	Berbatov 18'; Manchev 54'	Stadium: Mestalla; Attendance: 10,000; Referee: V. Lizondo Cortés

28 December 2005 Friendly	Valencian Community	2–1	Colombia	Valencia, Valencian Community
	David Navarro 9'; Juanfran 84'	Report	Castrillón 10'	Stadium: Mestalla; Attendance: 10,000; Referee: Ayza Gámez

27 December 2006 Friendly	Valencian Community	3–1	Peru	Elche, Valencian Community
	Natalio 52'; Parri 53'; Redondo 77'	Report	Vassallo 11'	Stadium: Martínez Valero; Attendance: 5,000; Referee: V. Lizondo Cortés

== Notable players ==
- (Spain) Eduardo Cubells
- (Spain) Arturo Montesinos
- (Spain) Severiano Goiburu

== Amateur team (UEFA Regions' Cup) ==
The Valencia amateur team is composed of Valencian players of Tercera División and lower divisions is in charge of defending the Valencian Country in the UEFA Regions' Cup. The team is made up of non-professional players, hence the team's name. With the new format disputed by regions, the Valencians have not qualified to dispute the European fight in any occasion.

Access to the Regions Cup is decided in the Spanish stage of the UEFA Regions' Cup, where the Valencian team achieved its best result in 2008, when it was proclaimed the winner of Group F of the First Spanish Phase of the VI UEFA Regions' Cup. This preliminary phase of Group F was played between 7 and 9 December 2007 in the Valencian town of La Nucia (Marina Baixa), but then, in the Spanish Intermediate Phase, they lost to the Catalonia amateur team.

In December 2019, the Valencian amateur team played in the First Spanish Phase of the 12th edition of the UEFA Regions' Cup in Vícar, Almería. They drew 0-0 against Andalusia and lost 2-1 against Asturias.

== See also ==
- Category:Footballers from the Valencian Community
