= Royal Melillan Football Federation =

Governing body of football in Melilla, Spain

UEFA
- Founded: 1999
- FIFA affiliation: n/a
- UEFA affiliation: n/a
- President: D. Diego Martínez Gómez
- Website: www.rfmf.es

The Royal Melillan Football Federation (Spanish: Real Federación Melillense de Fútbol; RFMF) is responsible for administering football in the Autonomous City of Melilla. They are not directly affiliated with FIFA or CAF or UEFA. Till now there has been no attempt to select a team to represent the whole Spanish exclave in North Africa. Only under 14 and under 18 years teams have played so far, against other autonomous entities of Spain.

At the autonomous community level (5th tier) of the Spanish football league system below the national competitions controlled by the Royal Spanish Football Federation, clubs from Melilla are placed along with those from Eastern Andalusia in Group 9 of the Tercera Federación rather than in their own group, but at the 6th level, the city has its own league, the Primera Autonómica de Melilla.
