= Region of Murcia autonomous football team =

Spanish regional football team

Region of Murcia
- Association: Region of Murcia Football Federation
- Head coach: José Antonio Camacho
- Most caps: Mariano Sánchez (5)
- Top scorer: Toché (2)
- Home stadium: Estadio Nueva Condomina
First colours	Second colours

First international
- Murcia 1–1 Lithuania (28 December 2005)

Biggest win
- Murcia 3–0 Ecuador (30 December 2006)

The Region of Murcia autonomous football team is the regional football team for the Region of Murcia, Spain. They are not affiliated with FIFA or UEFA, because it is represented internationally by the Spain national football team. It only plays friendly matches.

== History ==
Before the creation of the Football Federation of the Region of Murcia in 1924, the Valencian Football Federation (at the time known as the Levante Football Federation) absorbed the clubs from the provinces of Murcia and Albacete. Thus, the teams from the regions of Valencia and Murcia had the same federation and it was in charge of organizing the Levante Championship and summoning the national team from Levante, which competed twice in the Prince of Asturias Cup, an inter-regional competition organized by the RFEF. The Valencian team participated in the 1922–23 and 1923–24 editions of the tournament and was eliminated in the quarter-finals by Andalusia on both occasions. On 27 July 1924, the Murcian and Albacete clubs left the Levante Football Federation to create their own on 7 September 1924, then named the Murcian Regional Federation of Football Clubs, only adopting the current name in 1990.

The Murcia national team only played their first international game on 28 December 2005, debuting against Lithuania. The match ended in a 1–1 draw, with the author of the team's first-ever goal being Javi García. They followed it up with three more matches in three years, winning the first two and drawing the third. Their most recent match was held on 18 May 2011 at the Nueva Condomina against Real Madrid, and Murcia managed to keep their undefeated status by holding the club to a 2–2 draw. The goalscorers of that match include three legends, Pepe via an own goal, Karim Benzema and Cristiano Ronaldo.

== Coaches ==
- 2005–present: José Antonio Camacho

== Selected internationals ==
28 December 2005	Murcia	1–1	Lithuania	Murcia
21:00 CET	Javi García 51'		Lukšys 85'	Stadium: La Condomina; Attendance: 10,000; Referee: Pedro Javier Martínez Franco

30 December 2006	Murcia	3–0	Ecuador	Murcia
18:00 CET	Kike Mateo 18'; Zamora 31'; Pedro León 47'			Stadium: Nueva Condomina; Attendance: 7,000; Referee: Bernabé García

26 December 2007	Murcia	1–0	Equatorial Guinea	Cartagena
18:30 CET	Toché 1'			Stadium: Cartagonova; Attendance: 7,000; Referee: Martínez Franco

23 December 2008	Murcia	1–1	Estonia	Lorca
18:30 CET	Toché 44' (pen.)		Kink 15'	Stadium: Francisco Artés; Attendance: 3,500; Referee: Martínez Franco

18 May 2011	Murcia	2–2	Real Madrid	Murcia
19:00 CET	Pepe 53' (o.g.); Meca 66'		Benzema 48'; Cristiano Ronaldo 68'	Stadium: Nueva Condomina; Attendance: 31,000; Referee: Gregorio Bernabé García

== Notable players ==
- (Spain) Mariano Sánchez
- (Spain) Toché
- (Spain) Mista

== See also ==
- Category:Footballers from the Region of Murcia
- Valencian Community autonomous football team
