= Aragon official football team =

Spanish autonomous community team

Aragón
- Association: Federación Aragonesa de Fútbol
- Head coach: Víctor Fernández
First colours	Second colours

First international
- Valencian Community 5–0 Aragon (12 June 1918)

Biggest win
- Aragon 6–0 Basses-Pyrénées (Zaragoza, Spain; 11 June 1950)

Biggest defeat
- Valencian Community 5–0 Aragon (13 June 1918)

The Aragon official football team is the official football team for Aragon, Spain. They are not affiliated with FIFA, UEFA or the NF-Board. Therefore, they do not participate in international tournaments, but only play friendly games. Their most recent game was a 1–0 victory over Dolnośląski on 1 July 2025 in the UEFA Regions' Cup.

== History ==
=== Early history ===
With the birth of the Aragonese Football Federation (25 January 1922), the idea of a national team was born. On 28 May 1922, Aragón made his debut in a friendly against Osasuna, which ended in a narrow defeat at the Campo del Arrabal in Zaragoza. The game aroused an expectation never seen before in Zaragoza. The Aragonese national team, unlike to what happens today, was not made up solely of Aragonese players, but rather of members of the main Zaragoza teams, like Iberia, Fuenclara (1918–1924) and Universidad, and those who played for the Spanish side that day include Julio Ostalé.

The expectation generated by the debut of the national team would cause a great increase in interest in the beautiful game in the community, and with the rise of football in the region, the Aragonese Federation was soon included in the Spanish Federation. And to celebrate, the Aragonese team received the honor of facing both Real Madrid and Barcelona during the Fiestas del Pilar. Two years later, the Cantabrian Federation requested a double match against Aragon, the first leg being played in Santander and the second leg in the newly built Campo de la Torre de Bruil. Cantabria won the first match on 9 March 1924, but Aragon fought back and was capable of defeating the Cantabrian team in the second leg on 20 April. Both teams agreed on a new match to define the winner of their meeting, which took place in the following day, 21 April, at Aragon, and the third clash generated so much importance that they were forced to hire a Catalan referee, but despite that, the game was full of controversy, with two penalties for each side leveling the game at 1-1, but since a draw was not an option, both captains decided to prolong the match with an additional 30 minutes, in which the Aragonese team found the winner, and thus consolidating itself on the national scene.

On 8 December 1926, they played a friendly match against the Spanish National Team and Aragon surprisingly hold them to a 1-1 draw. On 22 June 1930, the Aragonese team defeated Catalonia by a score of 3-1, with the hero of the night being Burillo, who scored a hat-trick to give Aragon a victory that sealed their consolidation as one of the reference communities of Spanish football.

=== Stagnation ===
While other federations had taken giant steps, the Aragonese Federation and its corresponding team had experienced 20 years of stagnation. The double encounter against Basses-Pyrénées from France was supposed to have been the reactivation of the Aragonese team, but they failed at this goal. In 1958 a double international match against Basses-Pyrénées was repeated, and after losing 4-5 on French soil, they showed their superiority at Aragón with a 4-1 win, with this match being the first that the Aragón team played at the La Romareda stadium, packed for the occasion.

=== Revival ===
During the following years, the illusion of seeing the team again completely disappeared. However, in 1998 the Aragonese team resurfaced again in a match against Castilla y León played at Los Pajaritos, and the meeting ended in a 1-1 draw, with Aragon scoring first thanks to Sanjuán, but the Castilians equalized in the second half with a goal from Gusi. The second leg took place in La Romareda in 2002 and ended with a 3-0 win to Aragon, with goals from Fernando Soriano, Paco Salillas and Txiki, all of whom in the first-half. The influx of the public was much lower than on other occasions, which evidenced the progressive disinterest of the Aragonese fans for their team. On 28 December 2006, the last great episode in the history of the Aragonese national team took place. The Chilean team visited La Romareda that was divided between the 5,000 Chileans and the other 5,000 Aragonese. In this way, Aragón joined 12 other communities that had organized friendly matches against national teams. The coach of Aragon was Víctor Fernández and he lined up Rubén Pérez, Rodri, Chus Herrero, Pablo Alfaro, Álvaro Arbeloa, the young and promising Alberto Zapater and Cani, Antonio Longás, Ángel Lafita, Víctor Bravo and Moisés. The victory was taken by Aragon after a goal from substitute Javi Suárez in injury time, hence giving the fans a fitting end for the team.

== Match history ==
=== Results ===
Date	Venue	Home team	Opponent	Score
12 June 1918		Valencian Community	Aragon	5–0
13 June 1918		Valencian Community	Aragon	3–0

9 March 1924 Friendly	Cantabria	3–0	Aragon	Santander, Cantabria
	Ortiz; Óscar; Gacituaga	Report		Stadium: El Sardinero

20 April 1924 Friendly	Aragon	2–0	Cantabria	Zaragoza, Aragon
	Goal	Report		Stadium: Campo de la Torre de Bruil

21 April 1924 Friendly	Aragon	2–1 (a.e.t.)	Cantabria	Zaragoza, Aragon
	(pen.)	Report	(pen.)	Stadium: Campo de la Torre de Bruil; Referee: (Catalonia)

8 December 1926 Friendly	Spain	1–1	Aragon	Zaragoza, Aragon
		Report		Stadium: Campo de la Torre de Bruil

22 June 1930 Friendly	Aragon	3–1	Catalonia	Zaragoza, Aragon
	Burillo	Report	Álamo	Stadium: Campo de la Torre de Bruil

21 May 1950 Friendly	Basses-Pyrénées	4–4	Aragon	Pau, Pyrenees
		Report		Stadium: Stadium de la Gare

11 June 1950 Friendly	Aragon	6–0	Basses-Pyrénées	Zaragoza, Aragon
		Report		Stadium: Campo de la Torre de Bruil

1958 Friendly	Basses-Pyrénées	5–4	Aragon	Pau, Pyrenees
		Report		Stadium: Stadium de la Gare

1958 Friendly	Aragon	4–1	Basses-Pyrénées	Zaragoza, Aragon
		Report		Stadium: Estadio La Romareda

19 May 1998 Friendly	Castile and León	1–1	Aragon	Soria, Castile and León
	Gusi 67'		Sanjuán 33'	Stadium: Estadio Los Pajaritos; Attendance: 2,000; Referee: Celino Gracia Redondo (Aragon)

1 June 2002 Friendly	Aragon	3–0	Castile and León	Zaragoza, Aragon
	Eusebio (penalty missed)		Soriano 17'; Salillas 21'; Txiki 38'	Stadium: Estadio La Romareda; Attendance: 7,000; Referee: Arturo Daudén Ibáñez (Aragon)

28 December 2006 Friendly	Aragon	1–0	Chile	Zaragoza, Aragon
20:30 CET	Suárez 90+1'	Report		Stadium: Estadio La Romareda; Attendance: 10,000; Referee: Daudén Ibáñez

== Notable players ==
- (Spain) Fernando Soriano
- (Spain) Javi Suárez
- (Spain) Belsué
- (Spain) Pablo Alfaro
- (Spain) Álvaro Arbeloa
- (Spain) Milla
- (Spain) Alberto Zapater

== See also ==
- Category:Footballers from Aragon
