= Balearic Islands autonomous football team =

Balearic Islands
- Nickname: Selección Balear
- Association: FFIB
- Head coach: Lorenzo Serra Ferrer
First colours

First international
- Balearic Islands 0–2 Malta (Palma, Balearic Islands; 29 December 2002)

Biggest defeat
- Balearic Islands 0–2 Malta (Palma, Balearic Islands; 29 December 2002)

The Balearic Islands autonomous football team is the regional football team for the Balearic Islands, Spain. They are not affiliated with FIFA or UEFA, because it is represented internationally by the Spain national football team. It only plays friendly matches.

== History ==
The team only played one game, against Malta at Palma de Mallorca, and they were defeated by 0–2.

For December 2008 was dated another game, this time against Equatorial Guinea, but it finally was cancelled. However, the women's team could make their debut, with a 1–7 loss to Galicia in Pontevedra.

On 13 November 2018, the Balearic Islands football team played a friendly match against Mallorca in benefit for the victims of the floods at Sant Llorenç des Cardassar. The match ended with a 4–1 win for Mallorca.

== Matches ==
| 28 December 2002 Friendly | Balearic Islands | 0–2 | Malta | Palma de Mallorca |
| | | Report | Mifsud 55'; Turner 84' | Stadium: Son Moix; Attendance: 7,000 |

| 28 December 2008 | Galicia (women) | 7–1 | Balearic Islands (women) | Pontevedra |
| 18:00 | Vilas 3', 78'; Ríos 41', 55'; Boquete 59', 73'; Lomba 65' | Report | Cladera 84' | Stadium: Estadio Municipal de Pasarón; Attendance: 2,500; Referee: López Herves |

== Notable players ==
Balearic players who represented FIFA international teams

- Marco Asensio
- Mariona Caldentey
- Pili Espadas
- Patricia Guijarro
- Melisa Nicolau
- Emilio Nsue
- Maitane López
- Miguel Ángel Nadal
- Manuel Olivares
- Albert Riera
- José Luis Rondo
- Paco Soler
- Virginia Torrecilla
- Gabriel Vidal
- Boison Wynney

== See also ==
- Category:Footballers from the Balearic Islands
