= Canary Islands autonomous football team =

Football team for the Canary Islands, Spain

Canary Islands
- Nickname(s): Canario (The Canaries)
- Association: Federación Canaria de Fútbol
- Head coach: José Caballero
First colours	Second colours

First international
- Canary Islands 5–1 Venezuela (Las Palmas, Canary Islands; 6 February 1996)

Biggest win
- Canary Islands 5–1 Venezuela (Las Palmas, Canary Islands; 6 February 1996)

Biggest defeat
- Canary Islands 0–14 Argentina U23 (Las Palmas, Canary Islands; 14 November 2019)

The Canary Islands national football team is the "regional" football team for the Canary Islands, Spain, that contests only friendly matches as the Canary Islands are represented internationally by the Spain national football team. They are unaffiliated with FIFA or UEFA/CAF.

The Canary Islands under-19 team competes annually in the Atlantic Cup, an international tournament for U19 soccer teams held on the island of Gran Canaria, measuring themselves against the Spanish team and two other guests, in a competition that starts in the semifinals.

== History ==
=== Early history ===
The successes of the Spain national team at the 1920 Summer Olympics and their participation in the 1924 edition were well known by the Canarian people, who had also enjoyed directly watching the game of some of its players, who themselves were very enthusiastic in wanting to expand the sport in the islands, looking for a more flattering future than the one that awaited most of them on the islands. All these reasons led to the beginning of the planning of a "tournee" of a representative group of Canarian players through the mainland, and once the initiative arose, the rest of the local first-class clubs welcomed the idea, but suggested that instead of a club, a selection with the best players should be taken. The team who embarked on the "tournee" to Spain was mainly made up of players from local club Real Victoria, which had the likes of Ángel Arocha and José Padrón.

On 26 April 1925, the island team is announced in Valencia under the name of "Canarian Selection", and so, although the Selection of the Canary Islands was only officially created in 1996, there have been three matches in which the presence of the Canarian National Team was announced, twice in 1925 against Valencia CF in Mestalla, and once in 1952 against San Lorenzo de Almagro in Chamartín, and these games ended in a draw, a loss, and a win. Valencia FC was a powerful team at the time, and as expected, they scored first via Eduardo Cubells, but the Canarians fought back and equalized in the second-half courtesy of Padrón, and they managed to hold on to a 1-1 draw, which was seen as a great triumph for the Canarian players to have tied with such a superior team. On the other hand, the Valencian team was left embarrassed and asked for a tie-breaker to define the winner of their meeting, and both teams agreed to this new match, which took place two days later on 21 April, and their second clash generated so much expectation that it nearly filled Valencia's stadium. The game ended in a 0-3 loss to the Canarians. The excursion would continue through Castellón, Barcelona, Zaragoza and Madrid, and then coming back to play again in Barcelona, Seville and Huelva before returning to the Canary Islands.

The second time that the Canarian National Team was announced on the peninsula was against the powerful Argentinian team of San Lorenzo de Almagro. This meeting was arranged in tribute to José María Úbeda, a great sports critic for Pueblo and once an excellent footballer who had recently died, with the proceeds of the game going to help his family. Arsenio Arocha, a former Real Madrid player and then linked to Atlético Madrid, was chosen as the coach, and he formed a Canarian XI made up of seven Gran Canarians, three Tenerifens and one Palmero. The team that lined up on 10 January 1952 against San Lorenzo at the Chamartín had the likes of Luis Molowny and Rosendo Hernández. The Canarians scored four goals in just half an hour, the goalscorers being Hernández (twice), Cabrera and Gallardo. Cabrera netted his second and Canarian's fifth, but it was ruled out offside because of a threat of withdrawal from the Argentines, who fought during the clash with extreme violence, causing the injury of Canary's only goalkeeper, Cristóbal, which forced the Canarians to replace him with Real Madrid's goalkeeper Juanito Alonso, who was in the stands of Chamartín (the then Real Madrid Stadium) watching the game. The Canarians played considerably less in the second half due to the effort in the first, or because they already considered the victory assured, or because they chose to dodge the kicks of their rivals instead of trying to score one more goal, and naturally, they conceded two goals in the second half in an eventual 4-2 win.

=== Recent history ===
Their first official match was held on 6 February 1996 at Estadio Insular against Venezuela, who was making a three-match tour of the Canary Islands starting with them, and surprisingly, the Canarians trashed them 5-1, and remarkably, one of the Canary goalscorers, Juan Carlos Socorro, was a Venezuelan who at the time was playing for UD Las Palmas. On their next game on 22 December 1998, they also won by a 4-0 goal margin (4-0), this time against Latvia. Their first (and only) defeat came in the rematch against Venezuela on 17 May 2002, where they lost 0-2. In total, they played five games, 4 of which at Las Palmas, with the exception being the one held at Tenerife on 21 December 1999, which was also the only match where they faced a B team, Yugoslavia B. On 29 December 2007, after a 5-year hiatus, many of the best Canarian football players of the First and Second divisions delighted their fans with a 2-0 win over a 2006 World Cup team, Angola, with goals from Adrián Martín and Jorge Larena. The game against Angola still is their most recent fixture.

== Selected internationals ==
26 April 1925 Friendly	Valencia FC (Spain)	1–1	Canary Islands	Valencia, Canary Islands
	Cubells 37'	Report	Padrón 68'	Stadium: Mestalla; Referee: Humbert

27 April 1925 Friendly	Valencia FC (Spain)	3–0	Canary Islands	Las Palmas, Canary Islands
	Prats 39'; Peral 62'; Montes 74'	Report		Stadium: Estadio Insular; Referee: Juanito Martínez

10 January 1950 Friendly	Canary Islands	4–2	(Argentina) San Lorenzo	Madrid, Spain
	Hernández 10', 30'; Cabrera 23'; Gallardo 28'	Report	Silva 2half', 2half'	Stadium: Chamartín; Attendance: 40,000; Referee: Brown

6 February 1996 Friendly	Canary Islands	5–1	Venezuela	Las Palmas, Canary Islands
	Robaina 3'; Quintana 40'; Sandro 49'; Socorro 56'; Migue 59'	[ Report]	Rivas 29'	Stadium: Estadio Insular

22 December 1998 Friendly	Canary Islands	4–0	Latvia	Las Palmas, Canary Islands
		[ Report]		Stadium: Estadio Insular

21 December 1999 Friendly	Canary Islands	2–2	Yugoslavia B	Tenerife, Canary Islands
	Germán; Rafa	Report	Petković; Pažin	Stadium: Estadio Heliodoro Rodríguez López

17 May 2002 Friendly	Canary Islands	0–2	Venezuela	Las Palmas, Canary Islands
		Report	Vallenilla; Moreno	Stadium: Estadio Insular

29 December 2007 Friendly	Canary Islands	2–0	Angola	Las Palmas, Canary Islands
	Adrián Martín 1half' Jorge Larena 2half'	Report		Stadium: Estadio Gran Canaria

== Kits ==
Canary Islands' kit is a white jersey with piping gold with blue shorts and yellow socks. Their away kit is with a blue jersey. The kits are currently manufactured by Adidas, since 2012 the federation has supplied by Pony International.

== See also ==
- Atlantic Cup (in Spanish)
- Category:Footballers from the Canary Islands
- Divisiones Regionales de Fútbol in Canary Islands
