= Basque Country national football team results =

This is a list of results for the matches played by the Basque Country national football team (the association football team representing the 'Greater Basque Region', territories which are genuinely administered by France and Spain and their respective governing bodies in the sport), including unofficial friendly fixtures against full FIFA international teams, others against fellow representative teams which are not aligned to FIFA, and matches against professional clubs.

Since the 1990s, they have concentrated on arranging fixtures likely to improve perception of the team being accepted as a full international selection, as opposed to entering competitions for regions such as the CONIFA World Football Cup.

== Results against FIFA national teams ==
=== 1922 Gipuzcoan Federation matches ===
16 July 1922 Friendly	Argentina	4–0	Basque Country (Note: A 1922 tour of South America was officially organized by the Federation of Gipuzkoa with the participation of four players from the Federation of Biscay.)	Buenos Aires, Argentina
	Gaslini 55', 81'; Chiessa 67'; Rofrano 83'	Report		Stadium: Estadio Sportivo Barracas; Referee: McCarthy (Ireland)

20 August 1922 Friendly	Uruguay	4–0	Basque Country	Montevideo, Uruguay
	Romano; Scarone	Report		Stadium: Estadio Gran Parque Central

27 August 1922 Friendly	Uruguay	3–1	Basque Country	Buenos Aires, Argentina
	Sacco	Report	Travieso	Stadium: Estadio Sportivo Barracas

=== As Basque Country ===
The two main periods of match activity occurred in the late 1930s during the Spanish Civil War when the Basque team 'in exile' toured Europe and Latin America (where most of the players then settled), and from 1993 onwards when one match has been played almost every year.

28 November 1937	Mexico	1–4	Basque Country	Mexico City

5 December 1937	Mexico	1–2	Basque Country	Mexico City

12 December 1937	Mexico	0–4	Basque Country	Mexico City

9 January 1938	Mexico	3–1	Basque Country	Mexico City

29 May 1938	Cuba	0–4	Basque Country	La Polar, Havana

20 June 1938	Cuba	3–4	Basque Country	Havana

16 October 1938	Mexico	8–4	Basque Country	Parque Asturias, Mexico City

23 October 1938	Mexico	2–6	Basque Country	Parque Necaxa, Mexico City

30 October 1938	Mexico	1–3	Basque Country	Parque Asturias, Mexico City

2 March 1978	Basque Country	0–0	(Soviet Union) USSR	Bilbao
				Stadium: San Mamés; Referee: Sainz Elizondo

23 December 1979	Basque Country	4–0	Bulgaria	San Sebastián
	Dani 57', 61'; Idígoras 68'; Satrústegui 83'			Stadium: Estadio Atocha; Referee: Victoriano Sánchez Arminio

3 August 1980	Basque Country	1–5	Hungary	Vitoria-Gasteiz
	Amorrortu 40'		Garaba 37'; Nyilasi 70', 82'; Kiss 77'; Pásztor 86'	Stadium: Mendizorrotza; Attendance: 9,000; Referee: Victoriano Sánchez Arminio

21 March 1990	Basque Country	2–2	Romania	Bilbao
00:00 CET	Goikoetxea 29'; Urrutia 40'	Report	Rotariu 34'; Balint 65'	Stadium: San Mamés; Attendance: 10,000; Referee: Urizar Azpitarte

22 December 1993	Basque Country	3–1	Bolivia	San Sebastián
20:30 CET	Guerrero 24'; Salinas 63', 83'	Report	Moreno 15'	Stadium: Anoeta; Attendance: 23,000; Referee: Urio Velazquez

23 December 1994	Basque Country	1–0	Russia	Bilbao
20:30 CET	Guerrero 25'	Report 1 Report 2		Stadium: San Mamés; Attendance: 30,000; Referee: Contador Crespo

22 December 1995	Basque Country	1–1	Paraguay	Bilbao
20:30 CET	Ziganda 25'	Report	Blanco 81'	Stadium: San Mamés; Attendance: 25,000; Referee: Eduardo Iturralde González

26 December 1996	Basque Country	3–0	Estonia	Bilbao
20:30 CET	Ziganda 33'; Idiakez 61' Andrinúa 70'	Report		Stadium: San Mamés; Referee: Xabier Losantos Omar

27 December 1997	Basque Country	3–1	FR Yugoslavia	Bilbao
20:30 CET	Guerrero 47', 69', 83'	Report	Stevic 79'	Stadium: San Mamés; Attendance: 30,000; Referee: Miguel Angel Pérez Lasa

22 December 1998	Basque Country	5–1	Uruguay	San Sebastián
20:30 CET	De Paula 49'; Idiakez 51'; Ziganda 68', 88'; Urrutia 82'	Report 1 Report 2	Poyet 10'; Lembo (red card) 70'	Stadium: Anoeta; Referee: Eduardo Iturralde González

29 December 1999	Basque Country	5–1	Nigeria	Bilbao
20:30 CET	Guerrero 5'; Mendieta 49'; De Paula 56', 59'; De Pedro 70'	Report	Julius 21'	Stadium: San Mamés; Attendance: 38,000; Referee: Xabier Losantos Omar

29 December 2000	Basque Country	3–2	Morocco	Bilbao
20:30 CET	Urzaiz 9', 26'; De Pedro 89'	Report	Hadda 55'; Regragui 65'	Stadium: San Mamés; Attendance: 38,000; Referee: Miguel Ángel Pérez Lasa

29 December 2001	Basque Country	3–2	Ghana	Bilbao
20:30 CET	Bolo 46'; De Paula 60', 67'	Report	Boateng 13'; Taky-Mensah 70'	Stadium: San Mamés; Attendance: 42,000; Referee: Eduardo Iturralde González

28 December 2002	Basque Country	1–1	Macedonia	Bilbao
20:30 CET	Bolo 75'	Report	Šakiri 82'	Stadium: San Mamés; Referee: Miguel Ángel Pérez Lasa

27 December 2003	Basque Country	2–1	Uruguay	Bilbao
20:30 CET	Bolo 44', 47'	Report	Vigneri 55'	Stadium: San Mamés; Referee: Xabier Losantos Omar

29 December 2004	Basque Country	2–0	Honduras	San Sebastián
20:30 CET	Yeste 20', 35'	Report		Stadium: Anoeta; Referee: Eduardo Iturralde González

28 December 2005	Basque Country	0–1	Cameroon	Bilbao
20:30 CET		Report	Ocio 1' (o.g.)	Stadium: San Mamés; Referee: Miguel Angel Pérez Lasa

21 May 2006	Basque Country	0–1	Wales (Note: This is the only match played by any of the Home Nations of the United Kingdom against any of the Autonomous Communities of Spain.)	Bilbao
20:30 CET		Report	Giggs 76'	Stadium: San Mamés; Referee: Eduardo Iturralde González

27 December 2006	Basque Country	4–0	Serbia	Bilbao
20:30 CET	Yeste 33'; Urzaiz 41'; Sarriegui 60'; Uranga 87'	Report		Stadium: San Mamés; Referee: Carlos Delgado Ferreiro

20 June 2007	Venezuela	3–4	Basque Country	San Cristóbal, Táchira
18:00 CET	Torrealba 27'; Arango 80', 82'	Report	Aduriz 8'; Etxeberría 20', 40'; Gabilondo 30'	Stadium: Polideportivo de Pueblo Nuevo; Referee: Héctor Jairo Parra Romero

23 December 2008	Basque Country	Called off	Iran	Bilbao
				Stadium: San Mamés

29 December 2010	Basque Country	3–1	Venezuela	Bilbao
20:45 CET	Gurpegui 55'; Labaka 69'; Muniain 86'	Report	Vizcarrondo 32'	Stadium: San Mamés; Referee: Eduardo Iturralde González

25 May 2011	Estonia	1–2	Basque Country	Tallinn
20:45 CET	Kink 57'	Report	Aduriz 51', 62'	Stadium: A. Le Coq Arena; Referee: (Denmark) Anders Hermansen

28 December 2011	Basque Country	0–2	Tunisia	Bilbao
20:45 CET		Report	Msakni 66'; Chedli 82'	Stadium: San Mamés (1913 stadium); Attendance: 35,000; Referee: Eduardo Iturralde González

29 December 2012	Basque Country	6–1	Bolivia	San Sebastián
20:00 CET	Aduriz 9', 16'; Toquero 22', 56'; Ibai Gómez 27'; Agirretxe 90'	Report	Pontons 78'	Stadium: Anoeta; Attendance: 26,000; Referee: Miguel Ángel Pérez Lasa

28 December 2013	Basque Country	6–0	Peru	Bilbao
20:45 CET	Aduriz 12', 40'; Torres 22'; Agirretxe 48', 52'; Susaeta 80'	Report		Stadium: San Mamés (2013 stadium); Attendance: 27,000; Referee: Carlos Delgado Ferreiro

30 December 2016	Basque Country	3–1	Tunisia	Bilbao
20:30	Illarramendi 6'; Aduriz 19'; Oyarzabal 44'	Report 1 Report 2	Sassi 16'	Stadium: San Mamés; Attendance: 15,000; Referee: Ricardo de Burgos Bengoetxea

12 October 2018	Basque Country	4–2	Venezuela	Vitoria-Gasteiz
20:45	Ibai 25'; Bautista 49'; Arbilla 52'; Elustondo 88'	Report 1 Report 2	Romero 31'; Ponce 90'	Stadium: Mendizorrotza; Attendance: 14,200; Referee: Alberto Undiano Mallenco

29 May 2019	Panama	0–0	Basque Country	Panama City
20:00		Report 1 Report 2		Stadium: Estadio Rommel Fernández; Attendance: 10,000; Referee: (El Salvador) Jaime Alfredo Herrera

16 November 2020	Basque Country	2–1	Costa Rica	Eibar
20:45	Muniain 12'; Núñez 90+3'	Report	Moya 70'	Stadium: Ipurua; Attendance: 0 Referee: De Burgos Bengoetxea

23 March 2024	Basque Country	1–1	Uruguay	Bilbao
	Djaló 44'	Report	Vecino 46'	Stadium: San Mamés Stadium

15 November 2025	Basque Country	3-0	Palestine	Bilbao
				Stadium: San Mamés Stadium

14 November 2026	Basque Country	1–0	Venezuela	Bilbao
20:00	Mikel Jauregizar 27'	Report		Stadium: San Mamés Stadium; Attendance: 40,041; Referee: Ricardo de Burgos Bengoetxea (Basque Country)

== Record versus FIFA national teams ==
- Including 1922 South America tour

As of 31 December 2026

Rival	Pld	W	D	L	GF	GA	GD	Win % (Note: A draw counts as a ½ win)
Argentina	1	0	0	1	0	4	-4	0%
Bolivia	2	2	0	0	9	2	+7	100%
Bulgaria	1	1	0	0	4	0	+4	100%
Cameroon	1	0	0	1	0	1	−1	0%
Costa Rica	1	1	0	0	2	1	+1	100%
Cuba	2	2	0	0	8	3	+5	100%
Estonia	2	2	0	0	5	2	+3	100%
Ghana	1	1	0	0	3	2	+1	100%
Honduras	1	1	0	0	2	0	+2	100%
Hungary	1	0	0	1	1	5	−4	0%
North Macedonia	1	0	1	0	2	2	0	50%
Mexico	7	5	0	2	24	16	+8	71.43%
Morocco	1	1	0	0	3	2	+1	100%
Nigeria	1	1	0	0	5	1	+4	100%
Panama	1	0	1	0	0	0	0	50%
Paraguay	1	0	1	0	1	1	0	50%
Peru	1	1	0	0	6	0	+6	100%
Palestine	1	1	0	0	3	0	+3	100%
Romania	1	0	1	0	2	2	0	50%
Russia	1	1	0	0	1	0	+1	100%
Serbia (Note: Includes a friendly match against former FR Yugoslavia on 26 December 1997)	2	2	0	0	7	1	+6	100%
Soviet Union	1	0	1	0	2	2	0	50%
Tunisia	2	1	0	1	3	3	0	50%
Uruguay	5	2	1	2	9	10	-1	50%
Venezuela	4	4	0	0	12	6	+6	100%
Wales	1	0	0	1	0	1	−1	0%
Summary	43	28	6	9	114	67	+47	72.09%

== Results against non-FIFA national/regional teams ==
=== North Federation matches ===
3 January 1915 Friendly	Basque Country (Note: Matches were played as the 'North Federation' (Norte) team, including Cantabria, but usually featuring only players from the Basque provinces of Biscay and Gipuzkoa, each of which also organised their own representative matches occasionally.)	6–1	Catalonia	Bilbao, Basque Country, Spain
	Pichichi; Pagaza; Patricio	Report 1Report 2	Kinké	Stadium: San Mamés; Attendance: 6,000

7 February 1915 Friendly	Catalonia	2–2	Basque Country	Barcelona, Catalonia, Spain
	Monistrol; Kinké		Reguera 0' (o.g.); Belauste	Stadium: Camp de la Indústria; Attendance: 5,000; Referee: Emilio Sampere

12 May 1915 Prince of Asturias Cup	Basque Country	1–0	Catalonia	Madrid, Spain
	Legarreta	Report 1Report 2		Stadium: Campo de O'Donnell; Referee: (Community of Madrid) Menéndez

14 May 1915 Prince of Asturias Cup	Castile (Note: The 'Central Federation' (Centro) team, including Madrid and the wider Castile region.)	1–1	Basque Country	Madrid, Spain
	Bernabéu	Report	Patricio	Stadium: Campo de O'Donnell; Referee: (Community of Madrid) Carlos Dieste

21 May 1916 Friendly	Catalonia	1–3	Basque Country	Barcelona, Catalonia, Spain
	Kinké	Report	Patricio; Chacho; Pichichi	Stadium: Camp de la Indústria

22 May 1916 Friendly	Catalonia	0–0	Basque Country	Barcelona, Catalonia, Spain
		Report		Stadium: Camp de la Indústria

4 June 1916 Friendly	Basque Country	5–0	Catalonia	Bilbao, Basque Country, Spain
	Patricio; Legarreta			Stadium: San Mamés; Referee: Hurtado

=== As Basque Country ===
8 June 1930	Catalonia	0–1	Basque Country	Barcelona
			Gorostiza	Stadium: Montjuïc

1 January 1931	Basque Country	3–2	Catalonia	Bilbao
	Gorostiza 18'; Lafuente 36'; Olivares 39'		Samitier 7'; Arocha 65'	Stadium: San Mamés

29 November 1936	Cantabria	3–2	Basque Country	Santander
				Stadium: El Sardinero

27 December 1936	Basque Country	6–3	Asturias (Note: A combined team of players from Asturias and Cantabria.)	Bilbao
		Report		Stadium: San Mamés

6 May 1937	(Note: A combined team of players from FK Viktoria Žižkov, AFK Union Žižkov, SK Kladno, FK Kolín, FK Sparta Košíře, AC Sparta Prague, Nuselský SK, Bohemians 1905, SK Slavia Prague and SK Libeň)Central Bohemia	3–2	Basque Country	Prague
	Puč 22'; Svoboda 26'; Hruška 68'		Larrinaga 12'; Emelín 32'	Stadium: Stadion Letná

5 June 1937	Central Bohemia	6–3	Basque Country	Prague
	Cilauren 45' (o.g.); Vojáček 47', 49'; Smrž 48'; Senecký 70', 83'		Langara 27', 89'; Emelín 55'	Stadium: Slavia Prague's pitch

9 June 1937	Silesia	3–4	Basque Country	Chorzów
				Stadium: Ruch Stadium

30 July 1937	Georgian SSR	1–3	Basque Country	Tbilisi

22 August 1937	(Note: A team of players selected nationally from the AIF sports federation. The full national team is selected by the NFF.)Norway Workers	1–3	Basque Country	Oslo
				Stadium: Bislett Stadium

27 August 1937	(Note: A team of AIF affiliated players from IL Sparta, Sarpsborg FK, SK Rapid, Jeloy IF, SK Sprint, and Fremad Borge, all in Østfold.)Østfold AIF	2–3	Basque Country	Sarpsborg
	Jacob Johansen 24'; Cilaurren 83' (o.g.)		Langara 14', 53', 73'	Stadium: Sarpsborg Stadion

29 August 1937	(Note: A team of players selected nationally from the Dansk Arbejder Idrætsforbund, a workers' sports federation. The full Danish national team is selected by the DBU.)Denmark Workers	1–11	Basque Country	Copenhagen
	Baltzersen			Stadium: Sundby Idrætspark; Attendance: 3000

21 November 1937	Jalisco	1–5	Basque Country	Guadalajara
	Pirracas		Larrinaga (?); Langara; Regueiro	Stadium: Campo Guadalajara

1 November 1938	Jalisco	1–3	Basque Country	Guadalajara
				Stadium: Campo Guadalajara

6 November 1938	Jalisco	0–4	Basque Country	Guadalajara
				Stadium: Parque Oro

21 February 1971	Basque Country	1–2	Catalonia	Bilbao
	Maranon	Report	De Diego (?)	Stadium: San Mamés; Referee: Ortiz de Mendivil

8 October 2006	Catalonia	2–2	Basque Country	Barcelona
20:00 CET	Verdú 67'; Luque 84'	Report1; Report 2	Aduriz 19'; Llorente 64'	Stadium: Camp Nou; Referee: Lizondo Cortés

29 December 2007	Basque Country	1–1	Catalonia	Bilbao
20:30 CET	Aduriz 69'	Report1; Report 2	Bojan 29'	Stadium: San Mamés; Referee: Miguel Angel Pérez Lasa

28 December 2014 Centenary Trophy	Basque Country	1–1	Catalonia	Bilbao
20:30 CET	Aduriz 3'	Report 1 Report 2	Sergio García 44'	Stadium: San Mamés; Attendance: 40,000; Referee: Bikandi Garrido

26 December 2015 Centenary Trophy	Catalonia	0–1	Basque Country	Barcelona
21:30 CET		Report 1 Report 2	Aduriz 39'	Stadium: Camp Nou; Attendance: 51,224; Referee: Estrada Fernández

27 May 2016	Corsica	1–1 (8–9 p)	Basque Country	Ajaccio
20:00	Santelli 20'	Report 1 Report 2	Bergara 48'	Stadium: Stade Ange Casanova; Attendance: 2,400; Referee: Willian Laviz
	Penalties
	Modesto (penalty missed); Cavalli (penalty scored); Romain (penalty scored); Hugo Aine (penalty scored); Cabella (penalty scored); Coulbaly (penalty scored); Santelli (penalty scored); Pierazzi (penalty scored); Cioni (penalty scored); Cahuzac (penalty missed)		M.González (penalty missed); Eraso (penalty scored); Susaeta (penalty scored); Zurutuza (penalty scored); Dani García (penalty scored); Berchiche (penalty scored); Sabin M. (penalty scored); Zaldua (penalty scored); Ansotegi (penalty scored); Bergara (penalty scored)

== Record vs Non-FIFA teams / As 'North' region ==
Rival	Pld	W	D	L	GF	GA	GD	Win % (Note: A draw counts as a ½ win)
Asturias (Note: A combined team of players from Asturias and Cantabria.)	1	1	0	0	6	3	+3	100%
Cantabria	1	0	0	1	2	3	−1	0%
Castile (Note: Matches against the 'Central Federation' (Centro) team, including Madrid and the wider Castile region.)	1	0	1	0	1	1	0	50%
Catalonia	13	7	5	1	26	11	+15	73.08%
Central Bohemia	2	0	0	2	5	9	−4	0%
Corsica	1	0	1	0	1	1	0	50%
Denmark (DAI)	1	1	0	0	11	1	+10	100%
Georgia (GSSR)	1	1	0	0	3	1	+2	100%
Jalisco	3	3	0	0	12	2	+10	100%
Norway (AIF)	2	2	0	0	6	3	+3	100%
Silesia	1	1	0	0	4	3	+1	100%
Summary	27	16	7	4	77	38	+39	71.15%

== Non-international matches ==
Date	Venue	Home team	Score	Visitor
23 May 1921	San Mamés, Bilbao	Basque Country	0–1	(England) West Ham United
28 May 1922	Santander	North XI (Note: Playing as the 'North Federation' (Norte) team, including Cantabria, but usually featuring only Basque players.)	2–3	(Scotland) St Mirren
30 May 1922	Santander	North XI	2–2	(Scotland) St Mirren
23 July 1922	Buenos Aires	(Argentina) Porteño	1–1	Basque Country (Note: A 1922 tour of South America was officially organized by the Federation of Gipuzkoa with the participation of 4 players from the Biscay Federation.)
30 July 1922	Estadio Sportivo Barracas, Buenos Aires	(Argentina) Liga del Interior XI	0–4	Basque Country
6 August 1922	Rosario, Santa Fe	(Argentina) Liga Rosarina XI (Note: Made of players from Newell's Old Boys and Rosario Central)	2–1	Basque Country
7 September 1922	Santos	(Brazil) Santos XI (Note: Made of players from Santos FC and other clubs in the city)	0–5	Basque Country
10 September 1922	Chácara da Floresta, São Paulo	(Brazil) (São Paulo (state)) São Paulo XI	2–1	Basque Country
24 June 1932	Camp de Les Corts, Barcelona	(Spain) FC Barcelona	3–1	Basque Country
26 June 1932	Camp de Les Corts, Barcelona	(Spain) FC Barcelona	2–1	Basque Country
26 April 1937	Parc des Princes, Paris	(France) Racing Paris	0–3	Basque Country
9 May 1937	Toulouse	(France) Racing Paris	3–3	Basque Country
19 May 1937	Stade Jean-Bouin, Paris	(France) Racing Paris	2–3	Basque Country
23 May 1937	Stade de l'Huveaune, Marseille	(France) Olympic Marseille	2–5	Basque Country
30 May 1937	Sète	(France) FC Sète	3–1	Basque Country
24 June 1937	Dynamo Stadium, Moscow	(Soviet Union) FC Lokomotiv Moscow	1–5	Basque Country
27 June 1937	Dynamo Stadium, Moscow	(Soviet Union) FC Dynamo Moscow	1–2	Basque Country
30 June 1937	Leningrad	(Soviet Union) FC Dinamo Leningrad	2–2	Basque Country
4 July 1937	Moscow	(Soviet Union) FC Dynamo Moscow	4–7	Basque Country
8 July 1937	Dynamo Stadium, Moscow	(Soviet Union) FC Spartak Moscow	6–2	Basque Country
15 July 1937	Kyiv	(Soviet Union) FC Dynamo Kyiv	1–3	Basque Country
24 July 1937	Lavrenti Beria Dinamo Stadium, Tbilisi	(Soviet Union) FC Dinamo Tbilisi	0–2	Basque Country
9 August 1937	Minsk	(Soviet Union) FC Dinamo Minsk	1–6	Basque Country
7 November 1937	Mexico City	(Mexico) Club América	2–2	Basque Country
14 November 1937	Mexico City	(Mexico) Club Necaxa	1–2	Basque Country
19 December 1937	Mexico City	(Mexico) Asturias/España XI	3–1	Basque Country
26 December 1937	Mexico City	(Mexico) Asturias/España XI	2–3	Basque Country
2 January 1938	Mexico City	(Mexico) C.F. Atlante	0–3	Basque Country
16 January 1938	La Polar, Havana	(Cuba) Joventud Asturiana	4–4	Basque Country
23 January 1938	La Tropical, Havana	(Cuba) Centro Gallego	3–0	Basque Country
28 January 1938	La Polar, Havana	(Cuba) La Habana XI	0–2	Basque Country
30 January 1938	La Tropical, Havana	(Cuba) Joventud Asturiana	3–2	Basque Country
9 May 1938	Playa Ancha, Valparaíso	(Chile) Santiago Wanderers	2–4	Basque Country
5 June 1938	Havana	(Cuba) La Habana XI	0–2	Basque Country
7 August 1938	Veracruz	(Mexico) Club España de Veracruz	0–8	Basque Country
14 August 1938	Orizaba	(Mexico) Moctezuma de Orizaba	2–6	Basque Country
21 August 1938	Veracruz	(Mexico) Iberia de Córdoba	0–15	Basque Country
4 September 1938	Parque Asturias, Mexico City	(Mexico) Club Necaxa	1–4	Basque Country
11 September 1938	Parque Asturias, Mexico City	(Mexico) Club Necaxa	3–7	Basque Country
18 September 1938	Parque Asturias, Mexico City	(Mexico) Asturias/España XI	3–4	Basque Country
25 September 1938	Parque Necaxa, Mexico City	(Mexico) Club América	2–8	Basque Country
2 October 1938	Parque Asturias, Mexico City	(Mexico) Asturias/España XI	6–3	Basque Country
13 November 1938	Parque Oro, Guadalajara	(Mexico) Club América	0–5	Basque Country
12 league matches and 5 friendlies played as a club side in Mexico: C.D. Euzkadi
18 June 1939	Parque Necaxa, Mexico City	(Paraguay) Club Atlético Corrales	4–4	Basque Country
25 June 1966	Gal Stadium, Irun	Basque Country	0–2	(Spain) Real Madrid
13 August 1976	José Zorrilla, Valladolid	(Spain) Real Valladolid	2–1	Basque Country
6 June 1977	Manzanares, Madrid	(Spain) Atlético Madrid	2–3	Basque Country
16 August 1979	San Mamés, Bilbao	Basque Country	4–1	(Republic of Ireland) League of Ireland XI
10 May 1988	San Mamés, Bilbao	Basque Country	4–0	(England) Tottenham Hotspur
22 June 1993	Atotxa, San Sebastián	Real Sociedad	0–0	Basque Country

== See also ==
- Basque Football Federation
- Biscay Championship
- Gipuzkoa Championship
- List of Basque footballers
