= Regueiro =

Regueiro is a surname. Notable people with the surname include:

- Francisco Regueiro (born 1934), Spanish film director and screenwriter
- Francisco Javier Suárez Regueiro (born 1977), Spanish cyclist
- Julio Casas Regueiro (1936–2011), Cuban politician
- Luis Regueiro (1908–1995), Spanish footballer
- Luis Regueiro (Mexican footballer) (born 1943), Mexican footballer
- Maricarmen Regueiro (born 1966), Venezuelan actress
- Mario Regueiro (born 1978), Uruguayan footballer
- Melania Ballish Regueiro, American prima ballerina and artistic director
- Pedro Regueiro (1909–1985), Spanish footballer
- Sebastián Regueiro (born 1989), Uruguayan footballer
- Senén Casas Regueiro (1934–1996), Cuban politician

== See also ==
- Regueira
