= C.D. Euzkadi =

Basque football club in Mexico

Euzkadi
- Full name: Club Deportivo Euzkadi
- Nickname: Los Vascos (The Basques)
- Founded: 1938; 88 years ago
- Dissolved: 1939; 87 years ago
- Manager: Baltazar Junco
Home colours

Club Deportivo Euzkadi was a Basque football club, that played in the 1938–39 season of the Liga Mayor in Mexico City. It was formed when the Basque Country national football team, which had been touring the world, was refused permission by FIFA to play any more FIFA-affiliated teams due to political issues related to the Spanish Civil War. As a result of this ruling, the team, although originally from Spain, decided to stay in Mexico and participate in the amateur league under the name Club Deportivo Euzkadi, a move which FIFA allowed.

== Origin of team ==
In 1936, the Spanish Civil War broke out. On one side was the Republican faction, supported by the Soviet Union and International Brigades, and on the other side was the Nationalist faction, supported by the Third Reich and Fascist Italy. The Basque regional Government in the north of Spain sided with the Republican Government.

In 1937 in the midst of the civil war, José Antonio Aguirre, the first president of the Basque Country (then known as Euzkadi, and currently Euskadi), decided to send the Basque national football team abroad with the duel aim of raising money to take care of the many refugees fleeing the conflict, and also as a form of propaganda to let the world know there was a Basque Government trying to defend itself against the Nationalists.

This team left Bilbao on April 24, 1937, arriving in Paris for their first match on April 26. They toured Europe in the summer of 1937, visiting France, Czechoslovakia, Poland, the Soviet Union, Denmark and Norway, playing a mixture of national and league sides. They had great success, losing only 4 out of 20 matches, and winning 14.

However, their homeland, the Basque Country, was taken by the Nationalist forces, who set up a rival Spanish football federation that demanded the Basque team return to Spain, but the players refused to do so, and traveling aboard the steam ship Ile-de-France which set sail from Le Havre in August 1937, they traveled to Mexico to fulfill their contract to play a series of matches there. At this point the team began to several have problems with FIFA. As the team was traveling, FIFA informed the Federación Mexicana de Fútbol (FMF) that it was not to allow any of its teams to play the Basques, giving no specific reason why. However, the Federación Mexicana de Fútbol ignored FIFA's instruction, and on November 3, 1937, the federation's president and several other important dignitaries were in the city of Veracruz to greet the team when their ship docked.

In its first visit to Mexico, the Basques competed against the Mexico national team four times, winning three of the matches. Also, they played five matches against teams from the Primera Fuerza league, winning three and losing one, and one game against Selección Jalisco, which they won.

Following this, the team set off on January 10, 1938 for a tour of South America, beginning with 4 matches in Cuba. They then passed through the Panama Canal, traveling down to Valparaíso in Chile, and then crossing the Andes they travelled to Buenos Aires in Argentina. There they were expecting to play a series of matches against the five biggest Argentine clubs. When the team arrived in Buenos Aires, they were told that the matches would not be played due to FIFA's prohibition. The new football federation in Spain had been recognized by FIFA at the beginning of 1938, meaning that at this time Spain had 2 officially recognized football federations. One of the first acts of this new federation was to ask FIFA to "excommunicate" the Basque team. FIFA responded by prohibiting the Argentine clubs from playing the Basque team, and ruling that no other team should play them. However the Basque team, anticipating problems with FIFA, had become affiliated to the Federación Mexicana de Fútbol a few months earlier, on December 8, 1937, and so there was no legitimate reason to ban them. The Argentine authorities refused to accept the team was affiliated in Mexico and continued to refuse give the team permission to play in the league. The real reason for the team not being allowed to play was political in that the Argentine Government had labeled the team as "dangerous Soviet agents" and was keen to support the Nationalists as it was clear by this time that they were winning the war. Argentina was in fact one of the first countries to recognize Francisco Franco as the political leader of Spain. In addition to this, FIFA offered all the players money to return to Spain, which they all declined. The cancellation of the tour spelled disaster for the Basque team, most importantly in financial terms, because they had spent all their money traveling to Argentina, believing that they would earn more there. To help them out, the Argentine teams against whom they had been due to play, held a series of "benefit" matches to raise funds for the Basque team.

In May 1938, the team left Argentina traveling again via Chile where they played two matches to raise more money for the journey, and Cuba where they played 8 more. On August 3, 1938, the team arrived back in Mexico. With FIFA still making it very difficult for the Basques to arrange matches, and reluctant to split up, the team started to make arrangements with the organizers of the Mexican domestic league with the idea of participating in it. On September 2, 1938, FIFA apologized for their mistakes and declared the team free to play anyone. However, although the team now had offers to play in Peru, Costa Rica, Colombia and the United States, the team decided to continue with their plan to integrate into the Mexican league, which began on November 27, 1938. The Basque Country national football team became a club side. Club Deportivo Euzkadi was born.

== Members of the squad ==
The team consisted of the following players:

Name	Age	Previous club	Height
Goalkeeper
Gregorio Blasco	29	Athletic Bilbao	1.75 metres (5 ft 9 in)
Defenders
Serafín Aedo	30	Real Betis	1.70 metres (5 ft 7 in)
Pablo Barcos	25	Barakaldo	1.74 metres (5 ft 9 in)
Midfielders
Tomás Aguirre	26	Nîmes Olympique	1.69 metres (5 ft 7 in)
Leonardo Cilaurren	26	Athletic Bilbao	1.75 metres (5 ft 9 in)
Félix de los Heros	28	FC Barcelona	1.60 metres (5 ft 3 in)
José Muguerza	27	Athletic Bilbao	1.76 metres (5 ft 9 in)
Enrique Larrinaga	28	Racing Santander	1.72 metres (5 ft 8 in)
Pedro Regueiro	28	Real Madrid	1.71 metres (5 ft 7 in)
Ángel Zubieta	20	Athletic Bilbao	1.80 metres (5 ft 11 in)
Forwards
Emilio Alonso	26	Real Madrid	1.74 metres (5 ft 9 in)
Isidro Lángara	26	Real Oviedo	1.76 metres (5 ft 9 in)
Luis Regueiro (Captain)	30	Real Madrid	1.72 metres (5 ft 8 in)
José Iraragorri	26	Athletic Bilbao	1.75 metres (5 ft 9 in)
José Manuel Urquiola	26	Atlético Madrid	1.69 metres (5 ft 7 in)

The team was managed by Baltazar Junco. Also traveling with the team were Ricardo Irezábal and Manu de la Sota both as delegates, and Melchor Alegría as the organizer.

This was not exactly the same team as the one which had toured Europe the year before. Guillermo Gorostiza and Roberto Etxebarria had left in France after the side decided to travel on to Mexico. They both returned to the Basque Country, being replaced by José Urquiola and Tomás Aguirre respectively. The team's substitute goalkeeper Rafael Eguskiza had become seriously ill in Cuba in the summer of 1938 and could not be part of the team. Ignacio Agirrezabala (Chirri II), who had joined the team for their initial stay in Mexico, left the team while it was in Argentina because his brother lived there, as did Pedro Areso who joined Tigre. Félix de los Heros (known as 'Tache') was brought into the side. The team's trainer, Pedro Vallana, and masseur, Perico Birichinaga, had also left.

The team also suffered a great loss during the season when Zubieta was signed for San Lorenzo de Almagro in Argentina, and so missed the last three matches.

== The league ==
Primera Fuerza, also known as La Liga Major, was one of two large association football leagues in Mexico at the time. Six other teams contested the league. They were América, Asturias, Atlante, España, Marte and Necaxa. They were all teams from the area around Mexico City.

== League matches played ==
The team started the season well winning 5 of their first 6 matches, but as the season progressed several players became injured, Zubieta left, and due to the small size of the squad their results worsened.

Date	Venue	Home team	Score	Visitor
27 Nov 1938	Parque España	América	2–3	Euzkadi
4 Dec 1938	Parque Necaxa	Atlante	1–7	Euzkadi
18 Dec 1938	Parque Necaxa	Marte	1–7	Euzkadi
15 Jan 1939	Parque Necaxa	Necaxa	5–2	Euzkadi
29 Jan 1939	Parque Asturias	Asturias	4–5	Euzkadi
5 Feb 1939	Parque Asturias	España	1–5	Euzkadi
19 Feb 1939	Parque Asturias	América	2–1	Euzkadi
5 Mar 1939	Parque Asturias	Atlante	2–4	Euzkadi
12 Mar 1939	Parque España	Marte	3–2	Euzkadi
23 Apr 1939	Parque Necaxa	Necaxa	2–3	Euzkadi
30 Apr 1939	Parque Necaxa	Asturias	3–3	Euzkadi
7 May 1939	Parque Necaxa	España	7–2	Euzkadi

== Final score table for 1938/39 season ==
Club Deportivo Euzkadi finished the season as runners-up to Club Asturias.

Team	Played	Won	Drawn	Lost	Scored	Let in	Points
Asturias	12	7	2	3	30	27	16
Euzkadi	12	7	1	4	44	33	15
España	12	6	1	5	46	33	13
América	12	5	3	4	32	27	13
Necaxa	12	5	1	6	32	32	12
Marte	12	4	1	7	22	34	9
Atlante	12	3	1	8	22	42	7

Source: rsssf

== Stadiums ==
All league matches in the 1938/39 season were played in just 3 stadiums: Parque Necaxa, Parque España and Parque Asturias, all located in Mexico City. On March 26, 1939, the Parque Asturias stadium was severely damaged in a fire that began immediately after a match.

== Other matches ==
Apart from participating in the Primera Fuerza league during the 1938/39 season, Club Deportivo Euzkadi also played two friendly matches against a joint Marte/Atlante team (to raise money for poor children and the Mexican Red Cross), one against Atlante, and two others against Tampico.

Date	Venue	Home team	Score	Visitor
1 Jan 1939	Parque Asturias	Atlante/Marte XI	5–4	Euzkadi
7 Jan 1939	Tampico	Tampico XI	1–5	Euzkadi
8 Jan 1939	Tampico	Tampico XI	3–5	Euzkadi
21 Feb 1939	Parque Asturias	Atlante	2–2	Euzkadi
9 Apr 1939	Parque Necaxa	Atlante/Marte XI	2–8	Euzkadi

== Break up of the team ==
The Spanish Civil War ended in April 1939 with the victory of the Nationalists.

On May 7, 1939 the team played their last game as Club Deportivo Euzkadi, which was a 2–7 loss to Club España. Due to this loss, the team finished the season as runners-up in the league.

A month after the championship had ended the Basque Country national football team reformed for one last match, played on June 18, 1939, against the Paraguayan side Club Atlético Corrales. Included in the squad was the Basque goalkeeper Joaquín Urkiaga who had played the season in Club Asturias. The match ended as a 4–4 draw.

After this match the team was disbanded, and the players each received their first and only payment which was 10,000 pesetas. The players then joined various league sides in Mexico and Argentina. Cilauren, Alonso, Barcos, Blasco, Iborra, Muguerza, Aedo and Iraragorri signed for Club España. The Reguiero brothers, Urquiola, Aguirre and Larrinaga signed for Club Asturias. Lángara joined San Lorenzo de Almagro in Argentina, where Zubieta had gone mid-season.

== Legacy ==
The main legacy of the team was the impulse it gave to the professionalization of association football in Mexico. When the team arrived in Mexico in 1937, all its players were already professionals, whereas most Mexican players were not paid openly, and instead were employed in certain jobs where they were given special conditions so that they could play sport. With the arrival of the Basque team the number of spectators increased enormously and radio began to broadcast matches, so that Mexican footballers began to realize that they could begin to live only from football.

== See also ==
- Football in Spain
- Football in Mexico
