= Félix de los Heros =

Spanish footballer

Personal information
- Full name: Félix de los Heros Azcueta
- Date of birth: 21 January 1910
- Place of birth: Bilbao, Spain
- Date of death: March 1984 (aged 74)
- Height: 1.60 m (5 ft 3 in)
- Position: Midfielder
1932–1934	Barakaldo CF	?	
1934–1936	Sevilla FC	43	(15)
1936–1937	Gimnástico FC		
1937	FC Barcelona	0	(0)
1937–1938	Brooklyn Hispano		
1938–1939	Club Deportivo Euzkadi	6	(5)
1939–1942	Club España		
1942–1943	Moctezuma de Orizaba		(2)
1943	Albinegros de Orizaba		(4)
1943–1945	Tiburones Rojos de Veracruz		(7)

International career
Years	Team	Apps	(Gls)
1938	Basque Country	2	(0)

Félix de los Heros Azcueta (Basque: [fe'lix de los heɾos as̻'kueta]) (21 January 1910 – March 1984), also known as Tache, was a Spanish footballer from Bilbao in the Basque Country who played as a midfielder.

== Football career ==
It is unclear where or when de los Heros started his playing career but in 1932 he was playing for Barakaldo FC. In 1934 he moved to Sevilla FC. Late in 1936 he joined Gimnástico de Valencia. In 1937, in the middle of the Spanish Civil War, he joined Barcelona FC. His first game for them was on the 16 May 1937 against the Catalan national team. He never actually played for them in the domestic league but participated in the Barcelona FC tour of North America later in 1937. When the tour ended he signed for Brooklyn Hispano, a United States team that played in the American Soccer League. Later he moved to Mexico where he played for Club Deportivo Euzkadi in the Primera Fuerza league for the 1938/39 season. He also played for the Basque Country national football team twice during that period. Later he joined Club España, before going on to play in several other Mexican teams.
