= Regueira =

Regueira is a Galician surname. Notable people with the surname include:

- Ramón Regueira (1935–2021), Spanish footballer
- Maria Könning-de Siqueira Regueira (* 1954), German diplomat
- Fernando Regueira (* 1972), Argentine film writer

== See also ==
- Regueiro
