= Pedro Areso =

Spanish footballer and manager (1911–2002)

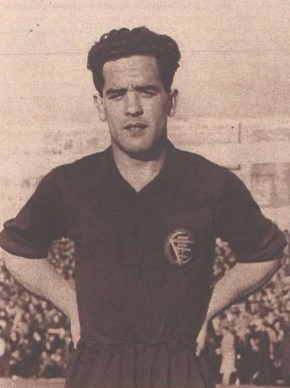
- Areso with Barcelona in 1936

Personal information
- Full name: Pedro Pablo Areso Aramburu
- Date of birth: 29 June 1911
- Place of birth: Ordizia, Gipuzkoa, Spain
- Date of death: 1 December 2002 (aged 91)
- Place of death: Buenos Aires, Argentina
- Position: Defender

Youth career
- Villafranca UC

Senior career*
Years	Team	Apps	(Gls)
1929–1930	Tolosa CF		
1930–1932	Real Murcia		
1932–1935	Real Betis		
1935–1936	Barcelona		
1938	Tigre		
1939–1940	Racing Club		
1941	River Plate		
1942–1945	Deportivo Vasco		
1945–1946	Racing de Santander		
1947–1948	Gimnástica Burgalesa		
1948–1949	Villafranca UC		
Total		87	(0)

International career
1935	Spain	3	(0)
1936	Catalonia	1	(0)
1937–1939	Basque Country	0+	(0+)

Managerial career
- 1946–1947: Racing de Santander
- 1947–1948: Gimnástica Burgalesa
- 1949–1951: Atlético Portugal
- 1951: Vitória Setúbal
- 1952–1953: Loyola SC
- Unión Española
- Tigre
- Dock Sud
- Deportivo Vasco
- Unión Española
- 1960–1961: Deportes La Serena
- 1963–1964: Español
- Lanús
- Talleres
- 1966: Platense
- 1967: Nueva Chicago
- 1968: Sarmiento de Junín
- 1969–1970: Unión Española
- 1972–1974: Rangers de Talca
- * Club domestic league appearances and goals

Pedro Pablo Areso Aramburu (29 June 1911 – 1 December 2002) was a Spanish footballer who played as a defender for Real Betis and FC Barcelona in Spain, and for Tigre and River Plate in Argentina. He also played for the Spain national team on three occasions in 1935.

As a manager, he took over teams in Spain, Portugal, Venezuela, Argentina and Chile, including RCD Espanyol in 1963–64.

== Playing career ==
Pedro Areso was born on 29 June 1911 in Ordizia, Gipuzkoa. (Note: One source wrongly states that he was born on 15 March 1909.) After playing for a few years in his hometown teams, Villafranca de Oria, and then Barakaldo CF, Areso moved to Tolosa, where he played for Tolosa CF in the 1928–29 season. There, he stood out as a great defender and thus caught the attention of the many scouts who were fishing in the Basque youth academy in those years, with Real Murcia acquiring his services in the summer of 1930, along with his partner in the Tolosa defense Gabriel Andonegui.

Areso was signed by Real Betis in October 1932, making his debut a few days later, on 12 October, in the 1932–33 Mancomunado Centro-Sur regional championship against CD Nacional de Madrid at the El Parral field in Madrid. He adapted to the Betis defense very quickly, becoming an undisputed starter and thus playing in all of the remaining official matches of the season. He was fast and forceful and always stood out for his maturity and understanding of the game. The following year, goalkeeper Joaquín Urquiaga and defender Serafín Aedo joined Betis, thus forming the famous defensive triplet that was the basis of Betis' historic league title in 1934–35, conceding a mere 7 goals in the entire tournament. In his three seasons at Betis, Areso played a total of 52 League games, 16 in the Copa del Rey, 26 in the Joint Regional Championship, 2 in the Andalusia Cup and 14 friendly matches.

In the summer of 1935, Areso was the star signing of FC Barcelona, where he joined coach Patrick O'Connell, but the outbreak of the Spanish Civil War in 1936 put a premature end to his career at Barça. During his short time there, the central defender became known in Barcelona as l'Stop.

During the civil war, Areso played for several teams in Argentina and Venezuela, such as Tigre (1938), Racing de Avellaneda (1939–40), River Plate (1941), C.D. Vasco (1942–45) before returning to Spanish football in 1945, where he played a season for both Racing de Santander and Gimnástica Burgalesa, finishing his career with his hometown team. In his last years, he combined the position of footballer and coach.

== International career ==
On 24 January 1935, Areso made his debut with the Spain national team in a friendly match against France at the Chamartín, playing in defense alongside his club teammate Aedo, and together they kept a clean sheet in a 2–0 win. Never before and never since have two Betis players debuted together in the national team in the same match. He went on to play a further two matches for Spain, both being friendlies in 1935, against Portugal in Lisbon (3–3) and then Germany in Cologne (2–1 loss).

On 1 January 1936, Areso earned his first and only international cap for the Catalan national team in a match against Andalusia at the Nervión in Seville, featuring in defense alongside Ramón Zabalo in a 5–1 loss.

During the Civil War, Areso and Aedo were part of the Basque Country national team that was organized by the Basque government of José Antonio Aguirre to play various friendly matches in Europe and later in America. After the end of the tour, he settled in Argentina and returned to Spain in 1945, while Aedo stayed forever in Mexico.

== Managerial career ==
Areso began his managerial career at the helm of Racing de Santander in 1946, at the age of 35. He then took charge of Gimnástica Burgalesa in the Tercera División, replacing Florentino Florenza. He then moved to neighboring Portugal, to take charge of Atlético de Portugal, a first division team that was in a delicate situation, but Areso managed to put together a homogeneous, magnificent team, which rose to third place, so he received tempting offers from Benfica and Belenenses, but Atlético did not let him leave. However, he had a stint with Vitória Setúbal before moving to South America.

After Portugal, Areso went on to coach teams in Venezuela (Deportivo Vasco and Loyola SC, Argentina (Tigre and Dock Sud) and Chile (Unión Española and Deportes La Serena. In the later, he guided Deportes La Serena to the 1960 Copa Preparación and got the promotion to the Chilean Primera División in 1961. In 1963, he was hired by Español as a technical director, where he formed a tandem with Alejandro Scopelli, but due to poor results he did not even finish the 1963–64 season.

Back to South America, Areso led Lanús, Talleres, Platense, Nueva Chicago and Sarmiento de Junín in Argentina and Unión Española again (1969–70) and Rangers de Talca (1972–74) in Chile.

== Later life and death ==
Areso was a central character in the Basque novel Ez dadila eguzkia sartu (Let not the sun go down).

Areso died on 1 December 2002, at the age of 91.
