= Urquiaga =

Urquiaga is a surname. Notable people with the surname include:

- Joaquín Urquiaga (1910–1965), Spanish footballer
- Santiago Urquiaga (born 1958), Spanish footballer
