= Serafín Aedo =

Spanish footballer

Personal information
- Full name: Serafín Aedo Renieblas
- Date of birth: 11 November 1908
- Place of birth: Baracaldo, Spain
- Date of death: 14 October 1988 (aged 79)
- Place of death: Mexico City, Mexico
- Height: 1.70 m (5 ft 7 in)
- Position: Defender

Senior career*
Years	Team	Apps	(Gls)
1930–1931	Unión Sport San Vicente	?	(0)
1931–1933	Baracaldo CF	?	(0)
1933–1936	Real Betis	61	(0)
1938–1939	Club Deportivo Euzkadi	10	(0)
1939–1942	Club España	?	(0)
1942–1943	River Plate	?	(0)
1943–1949	Club España	?	(0)
Total		71	(0)

International career
1935–1936	Spain	4	(0)
1937–1939	Basque Country	40	(0)
- * Club domestic league appearances and goals

Serafín Aedo Renieblas (11 November 1908 – 14 October 1988) was a Spanish international footballer from Baracaldo in the Basque Country who played professionally as a defender in Spain, Mexico and Argentina between 1930 and 1949.

== Career ==
=== Club career ===
In 1930 Aedo joined his first club Union Sport de San Vicente, which played in the third tier of Biscayan football. In 1931 he moved to Baracaldo CF, and then in 1933 to Real Betis where he teamed up for the first time with fellow Basque Pedro Areso. The pair made a formidable defense, helping Betis win La Liga in the 1934-35 season.

It has been claimed that he joined FC Barcelona in 1936, and that due to the outbreak of the Spanish Civil War he was not able to play an official match for them. However others claim that he never signed for Barcelona and that he remained a player for Real Betis until the outbreak of the civil war. During the 1938-39 season he played for Club Deportivo Euzkadi in the Mexican league. In 1939 he joined Club España, also in Mexico, where he played until his retirement in 1949, except for one year he spent playing for River Plate in Argentina.

After retiring as a player he went on to work as a coach at Club España.

=== International career ===
Aedo earned 4 caps for the Spanish national side in 1935 and 1936. From 1937 to 1939 he was part of the Basque Country national team which toured Europe and the Americas.

=== Other work ===
On retiring from football, he opened a shop in Mexico City selling photographic materials, before later becoming an insurance broker.

== Personal life ==
He married Miren Anúzita Zubizarreta and had three children, Miren, Jon Andoni and Angel.

His grandchild, Jon Andoni Aedo Donohue, played for the Mexico U-23 team in the Ponce 1993 Centro American games and won a silver medal.
