= José Manuel Urquiola =

Spanish footballer (1912–1982)

Personal information
- Full name: José Manuel Urquiola Gaztañaga
- Date of birth: 18 April 1912
- Place of birth: Tolosa, Spain
- Date of death: 21 May 1982 (aged 70)
- Position: Forward

Senior career*
Years	Team	Apps	(Gls)
1928–1934	Tolosa		
1934–1935	Deportivo Alavés		
1935–1936	Atlético Madrid		
1938–1939	CD Euzkadi		
1939–1940	Real Club España		
?	FC Sète 34		

International career
1937–1938	Basque Country	0+	(0+)
- * Club domestic league appearances and goals

José Manuel Urquiola Gaztañaga (18 April 1912 – 21 May 1982) was a Spanish footballer who played as a forward for Deportivo Alavés and Atlético Madrid in the 1930s.

== Career ==
Born in Gipuzkoan town of Tolosa on 18 April 1912, Urquiola began his career at his hometown club Tolosa, making his debut in a Segunda División match against CA Osasuna on 26 May 1929, at the age of 17, which ended in a 1–5 loss, thus sealing Tolosa's relegation to the Tercera División. He stayed there for six years until 1934, when his talents were finally noticed by bigger clubs and he was signed by Deportivo Alavés of Segunda, where he played one season before moving to Atlético Madrid in 1935, for whom he also played just one season, having few chances and playing just a single La Liga match.

During the Spanish Civil War, Urquiola was called up by the Basque Country national team, which had changed its name to Euzkadiko selekzioa, to replace the left winger Guillermo Gorostiza, who had decided to return to Spain after the fall of Bilbao. He then participated in its tour abroad, which was organized by the Basque government of José Antonio Aguirre with the dual aim of raising money to fund the cost of the civil war, and also as a form of propaganda to let the world know about the conflict in Spain.

According to his immigration record, Urquiola arrived in Mexico in 1938, for a one-year stay with the objective of "training different teams of the Mexican sports confederation", a period that would be extended for one more year, until 14 October 1940. He was a member of the C.D. Euzkadi side that played in the 1938–39 Mexican league, and in the following season, he played for Real Club España, scoring a total of five goals. After the war ended in 1939, he signed for French top-flight side Sète.
