= José Muguerza =

Spanish footballer (1911–1980)

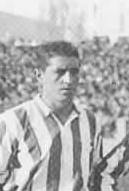
- Muguerza in 1931

Personal information
- Full name: José Muguerza Anitua
- Date of birth: 15 September 1911
- Place of birth: Eibar, Spain
- Date of death: 23 October 1980 (aged 69)
- Place of death: Mexico
- Position: Midfielder

Senior career*
Years	Team	Apps	(Gls)
1927–1929	Unión Deportiva Eibarresa		
1929–1936	Athletic Bilbao	129	(1)
1938–1939	Club Deportivo Euzkadi	12	(0)
1939–?	Club España		

International career
1930–1936	Spain	9	(0)
1937–1939	Basque Country	43	(0)

Managerial career
- 1952–1953: Monterrey
- 1953–1955: Anáhuac
- * Club domestic league appearances and goals

José Muguerza Anitua (15 September 1911 – 23 October 1980) was a footballer from the Basque Country in northern Spain, who played as a midfielder.

== Club career ==
Muguerza was born in Eibar. He began his career at Unión Deportiva Eibarresa in 1927 before moving in 1929 to Athletic Bilbao where he stayed until 1937, winning La Liga and the Copa del Rey four times each. In the 1938–39 season he played for Club Deportivo Euzkadi in the Primera Fuerza league in Mexico, after which he joined Club España also in Mexico.

== International football ==
Muguerza earned nine caps for the Spain national team between 1930 and 1936, including participating in the 1934 FIFA World Cup. In 1937, during the Spanish Civil War, he was selected for the Basque national team tour of Europe, which was undertaken to draw attention to the war in Spain. When the Basque Country was captured by fascist forces the team travelled to the Americas where they continued their tour, playing the tour's final match in June 1939. In total Muguerza played 43 games for the Basque national team.

== Coaching career ==
From 1952 to 1953 he coached Club de Fútbol Monterrey.

== Other work ==
In 1949 Muguerza opened a shop selling shirts in Mexico City.

== Personal life ==
Muguerza married Rosario Juaristi and had two children, José Miguel and Rosario.

He died on 23 October 1980 in Mexico.

== Honours ==
Athletic Bilbao

- La Liga: 1930, 1931, 1934, 1936
- Copa del Rey: 1930, 1931, 1932, 1933
