= Tomas Agirre =

Spanish footballer

Personal information
- Full name: Tomas Agirre Lekube
- Date of birth: 31 January 1912
- Place of birth: Bilbao, Spain
- Date of death: 1979
- Place of death: Getxo, Bizkaia
- Height: 1.69 m (5 ft 6 1/2 in)
- Position: Midfielder
193?–1935	CD Getxo	?	(?)
1935–1936	Arenas Club de Getxo	?	(?)
1938–1939	Club Deportivo Euzkadi	1	(0)
1939–194?	Club Asturias	?	(?)

International career
Years	Team	Apps	(Gls)
1937–1938	Basque Country	24	(0)

Tomas Agirre Lekube (Basque: [to'mas agire lekube]) (31 January 1912 - 1979), was a footballer from Bilbao in the Basque Country in northern Spain, who played as a midfielder.

== Career ==
He began his football career at CD Getxo, a team which gained steady progression though the minor leagues of Basque football. In 1935 he joined Arenas Club de Getxo which was playing in La Liga where he played until the outbreak of the Spanish Civil War in 1936. Some sources claim he then travelled to France where he played for the newly formed Nîmes Olympique.

In 1937, when the Basque Country was invaded by fascist forces during the Spanish Civil War, he joined in the Basque national team for its tour of Latin America from 1937 to 1938. Towards the end of 1938 he joined Club Deportivo Euzkadi which played the Primera Fuerza league in Mexico. The following year he joined Club Asturias also in Mexico, after which became a football coach.

== Personal life ==
Agirre was the sixth of ten children born to his parents, Teodoro Agirre Barrenechea-Arando and Bernardina Lekube Aramburu. He got married in 1957 to Begoña Erkiaga Lejarraga. His brother José Antonio Agirre, also a footballer with Athletic Bilbao, went on to become the first President of the Basque Country.
