= Pablito Barcos =

Spanish footballer

Personal information
- Full name: Pablo Barcos Plaza
- Date of birth: 26 January 1913
- Place of birth: Sestao, Spain
- Date of death: 31 December 1997 (aged 84)
- Place of death: Mexico City, Mexico
- Height: 1.73 m (5 ft 8 in)
- Position: Defender

Senior career*
Years	Team	Apps	(Gls)
1931–1936	Barakaldo		
1938–1939	Club Deportivo Euzkadi		
1939–1940	Club España		

International career
1937–1939	Basque Country	26	
- * Club domestic league appearances and goals

Pablo Barcos Plaza (usually known as just Pablito; 26 January 1913 – 31 December 1997) was a Spanish footballer from Sestao in the Basque Country who played as a defender.

== Personal life ==
Barcos was born in Sestao in the Basque Country in 1913. In 1939 he settled in Mexico where he married Alicia Urquiola and had two children, Pablo and Jesús.

== Career ==
From 1931 to 1936 Barcos played for Baracaldo F.C. In the summer of 1936, just as he was about to sign for Athletic Bilbao, the Spanish Civil War began and all national leagues in Spain were suspended. At the beginning of 1937, a Basque Country national football team was selected to travel abroad to raise money to help refugees fleeing the civil war. Barcos was a member of this team which toured Europe and the Americas.

While on that tour he was once chosen to play an entire match as goalkeeper because the team goalkeeper was injured and they had no substitute. The match was against the Mexico national team and ended with a 6-2 victory to the Basques.

During the 1938/39 season he played for Club Deportivo Euzkadi in the Primera Fuerza league in Mexico. In 1939 Barcos joined Club España from where he soon retired from football due to injuries.

After leaving football he worked for the tyre company Goodrich-Euzkadi. He also dedicated much of his time to training young footballers.
