= Óscar de Paula =

Spanish footballer and manager

Personal information
- Full name: Óscar Javier de Paula Gamero
- Date of birth: 31 May 1975 (age 51)
- Place of birth: Durango, Spain
- Height: 1.80 m (5 ft 11 in)
- Position: Striker

Youth career
- Olivenza
- Salesianos
- Badajoz

Senior career*
Years	Team	Apps	(Gls)
1993–1995	Badajoz	27	(5)
1995–2006	Real Sociedad	273	(57)
2006–2007	Cádiz	30	(4)
2007–2011	Ponferradina	114	(48)
Total		444	(114)

International career
1996–1998	Spain U21	8	(1)
1998–2001	Basque Country	4	(5)

Managerial career
- 2015–2016: Badajoz
- 2016–2017: Palencia
- 2017–2018: Extremadura B
- 2021–2022: Oliva
- 2022–2023: Jerez
- * Club domestic league appearances and goals

Óscar Javier de Paula Gamero (born 31 May 1975) is a Spanish former professional footballer who played as a striker, currently a manager.

Most of his 18-year senior career was associated with Real Sociedad, for which he appeared in 11 La Liga seasons, playing 300 competitive matches and scoring 60 goals.

== Club career ==
Born in Durango, Basque Country, de Paula began his football career with lowly clubs in the Province of Badajoz as his family hailed from Olivenza (Extremadura). He signed for CD Badajoz while still a junior, and made his professional debut midway through the 1992–93 campaign in the Segunda División.

At the beginning of 1995–96, de Paula moved back to his native region to play for La Liga side Real Sociedad. His first game came on 10 September 1995, featuring three minutes in the 2–0 home win against Sporting de Gijón. He went on to spend 11 seasons at the former, all of them in the top flight.

De Paula's time as a player for Real Sociedad was very successful, but he was never a regular starter, more often than not scoring after coming in as a substitute and with a good goal scored/minutes played ratio. Through 1999 to 2001, he netted nine goals in each season; still, he made only 11 appearances in 2002–03 as they finished runners-up and, in his last year, managed just six matches (280 minutes) with three goals.

In June 2006, de Paula's contract expired and he left and moved south to Cádiz CF in the second division. He descended yet another tier to Segunda División B at the end of the 2007–08 campaign after joining SD Ponferradina, totalling 32 league goals over his first two seasons (16 apiece).

De Paula scored 11 times in 25 games in 2009–10 as the Castile and León team returned to division two after a three-year absence. However, Ponfe would be immediately relegated and, aged 36, he announced his professional retirement due to a recurrent knee injury, having appeared in 356 league matches across both major levels and scored 71 goals.

== International career ==
De Paula won eight caps for Spain at under-21 level in one year. His made his debut on 8 October 1996, when he started the 2–1 away victory over the Czech Republic for the 1998 UEFA European Championship qualifiers.

== Coaching career ==
In January 2012, de Paula returned to Badajoz, where he was hired as youth system coordinator. In April 2013, he started working with the Extremaduran Football Federation as a regional coach in the sub'12 and sub'16 categories, also being head director of its football academy.

On 11 June 2015, de Paula was appointed head coach of Badajoz ahead of the season in the Tercera División, declaring the side's intentions to promote. They eventually reached the play-offs, but he had already been dismissed on 26 January 2016 after six matches without a win.

De Paula became the new manager of CD Palencia Balompié in mid-August 2016, after signing a one-year contract. He left the position in March 2017, following a poor string of results.

On 8 June 2019, after one season as coach of Extremadura UD's reserves, de Paula returned to Badajoz as director of football. He worked again as head coach in the following campaigns, with amateurs CP Oliva and Jerez CF.

== Honours ==
Ponferradina

- Segunda División B: 2007–08
