= Luis Regueiro (Mexican footballer) =

Mexican footballer (born 1943)

Personal information
- Full name: Luis Regueiro Urquiola
- Date of birth: 22 December 1943 (age 82)
- Place of birth: Mexico City, Mexico
- Position: Midfielder

Senior career*
Years	Team	Apps	(Gls)
- Club Universidad Nacional

International career
1966–1968	Mexico	19	(1)
- * Club domestic league appearances and goals

Luis Regueiro Urquiola (born 22 December 1943) is a Mexican former footballer who played as a midfielder.

== Career ==
He played for Mexico national team in the 1966 FIFA World Cup. He also played for Club Universidad Nacional.

His father, also named Luis Regueiro, was himself an international footballer, but for Spain, who settled and raised a family in Mexico after being part of the Euzkadi squad which toured abroad during the Spanish Civil War.
