= Pedro Regueiro =

Spanish footballer (1909–1985)

Personal information
- Full name: Pedro Regueiro Pagola
- Date of birth: 19 December 1909
- Place of birth: Irun, Spain
- Date of death: 11 June 1985 (aged 75)
- Place of death: Mexico City, Mexico
- Height: 1.71 m (5 ft 7 in)
- Position: Midfielder

Senior career*
Years	Team	Apps	(Gls)
1925–1929	Real Unión	9	(0)
1929–1930	Real Betis	30	(1)
1930–1932	Real Unión	29	(1)
1932–1936	Real Madrid	77	(0)
1938–1939	Club Deportivo Euzkadi	7	
1939–1944	Club Asturias		

International career
1928–36	Spain	4	(0)
1937–1938	Basque Country	33	(3)
- * Club domestic league appearances and goals

Pedro Regueiro Pagola (Basque: [pedro re'gueiɾo pa'gola] 19 December 1909 – 11 June 1985) was a Spanish footballer who played as a midfielder.

== Career ==
Born in Irun in the Basque Country, Regueiro started his playing career at Real Unión in 1925. He moved for one season to Real Betis in 1929, after which he returned to Real Unión for two more seasons. In 1932 he moved to Real Madrid where he played with his older brother Luis Regueiro.

In 1937 and 1938, during the Spanish Civil War in his homeland, he played for the Basque representative team which toured Europe and the Americas, ending up in Mexico where he initially played for Club Deportivo Euzkadi (The Basque exiles' team) in the Primera Fuerza league for the 1938–39 season. He then joined Mexican side Club Asturias where he played with his younger brother Tomás Regueiro, and helped the club win the first championship of the newly created Mexican Primera División (1943–44).

== Personal life ==
In 1939 Regueiro settled in Mexico, where he married Peri Romero in 1943 and had four children: Pedro, Mari Carmen, María Eugenia and José.

Pedro older brother, Luis, was also a footballer who played for Real Madrid
