= 1942–43 Liga Mayor season =

Liga Mayor
- Season: 1942–43
- Champions: CD Marte (2nd title)
- Matches: 56
- Goals: 278 (4.96 per match)
- Top goalscorer: Manuel Alonso (17 goals)

The 1942–43 season was the 21st edition of the amateur league called Liga Mayor. It was the last season before the first professional and true national league was started in 1943.

== Standings ==
Pos	Team	Pld	W	D	L	GF	GA	GD	Pts
1	CD Marte	14	8	3	3	46	28	+18	19
2	Atlante FC	14	7	4	3	36	28	+8	18
3	Club Necaxa	14	7	3	4	34	36	−2	17
4	Moctezuma de Orizaba	14	5	3	6	29	33	−4	13
5	Selección Jalisco	14	5	2	7	34	39	−5	12
6	RC España	14	4	4	6	33	39	−6	12
7	Club América	14	5	1	8	38	40	−2	11
8	Asturias FC	14	4	2	8	28	35	−7	10

Source: RSSSF

== Results ==
Home \ Away	AME	AST	ATL	ESP	MAR	MOC	NEC	SJA
Club América	—	3–2	2–5	6–2	2–4	1–1	5–0	2–5
Asturias FC	1–4	—	3–2	4–1	2–4	4–1	2–2	3–2
Atlante FC	4–2	2–1	—	2–2	1–0	1–1	3–1	5–1
RC España	1–3	3–0	3–3	—	1–5	3–0	3–4	1–3
CD Marte	3–1	2–1	4–1	3–3	—	2–4	4–0	3–3
Moctezuma de Orizaba	2–0	3–3	4–1	2–4	4–3	—	2–3	2–3
Club Necaxa	5–3	2–1	2–4	3–3	3–3	4–1	—	2–1
Selección Jalisco	5–4	4–1	2–2	1–3	2–6	1–2	1–3	—

Source: RSSSF
Legend: Blue = home team win; Yellow = draw; Red = away team win.

=== Top goalscorers ===
Player	Club	Goals
(Mexico) Manuel Alonsoa	CD Marte	17
