= Rafael Eguzkiza =

Spanish footballer

Personal information
- Full name: Rafael Eguzkiza Aurrekoetxea
- Date of birth: 5 February 1912
- Place of birth: Erandio, Spain
- Date of death: 3 May 1981 (aged 69)
- Place of death: Mexico City, Mexico
- Position: Goalkeeper

Senior career*
Years	Team	Apps	(Gls)
1930–1932	Apurtuarte Club		
1932–1936	Arenas Club de Getxo	64	(0)

International career
1937–1938	Basque Country	10	(0)
- * Club domestic league appearances and goals

Rafael Eguzkiza Aurrekoetxea (Basque: [rafa'el egus̻'kis̻a aurekoe'tʃea], usually written as Egusquiza Aurrecoechea in Spanish literature, 5 February 1912 – 3 May 1981) was a Spanish footballer from Erandio in the Basque Country who played as a goalkeeper. He is most remembered for being part of the Basque Country national football team on its 1937/38 tour of Europe and America.

== Career ==
His career began at Apurtuarte Club, his home town football club. In 1932 he joined Arenas Club de Getxo, which had been one of the founding members of La Liga just four years earlier in 1928. The first match in which he started was on 13 March 1932 against Real Unión, which Arenas won 5-0. In 1935 Arenas Club de Getxo were relegated to the second division. Eguzkiza almost signed for a different club, but finally stayed with Arenas for that season. In 1936 Real Madrid offered to buy him, but with the outbreak of the Spanish Civil War in the same year the national leagues were suspended. In total Eguzkiza had played 50 matches in La Liga, and 14 in the second division.

In 1937 Eguzkiza was chosen to join the Basque Country national team as backup goalkeeper for their tour of Europe, the purpose of which being to raise money for refugees who had fled Spain, and also as a form of propaganda to let the world know that there was a Basque government resisting the fascist rebels. The team traveled through France, Czechoslovakia, Poland, the Soviet Union, Norway and Denmark in the spring and summer of 1937 and had great success.

In the summer of 1937 the Basque Country was captured by the rebel fascist army. Most of the players in the squad decided not to return there and instead to stick together and travel to Mexico to continue the tour there. Shortly after their arrival in Mexico Gregorio Blasco, the main goalkeeper, became injured and Eguzkiza was called up to play frequently. The team played ten matches in Mexico before travelling to Cuba in 1938 to play four more. They continued on to Argentina, but were not allowed to play due to a ruling from FIFA. The team stayed in Argentina for three months without playing.

During this time Eguzkiza developed a problem with his lungs and became seriously ill. Eventually the team decided to return to Mexico, passing through Cuba again in June 1938. When the team reached Cuba, Eguzkiza's problem worsened and he was hospitalized. Eventually he had a lung removed. His playing career ended here. However a few months later he returned to Mexico where he was reunited with his teammates, although he remained hospitalised for some time in the Sanatorio Español in Mexico City. In June 1939 the members of the Basque Country team decided to go their separate ways. Most joined league teams based in Mexico City. Eguzkiza joined Real Club España as a coach.
