= 1941–42 Liga Mayor season =

Liga Mayor
- Season: 1941–42
- Champions: RC España (6th title)
- Matches: 57
- Goals: 293 (5.14 per match)
- Top goalscorer: Rafael Meza (20 goals)

The 1941–42 season was the 20th edition of the amateur league called Liga Mayor.

== Standings ==
Pos	Team	Pld	W	D	L	GF	GA	GD	Pts
1	Real España	14	7	4	3	38	26	+12	18
2	Atlante FC	14	8	2	4	44	36	+8	18
3	Moctezuma de Orizaba	14	8	1	5	38	29	+9	17
4	Club Necaxa	14	5	5	4	31	30	+1	15
5	CD Marte	14	6	2	6	34	35	−1	14
6	Selección Jalisco	14	4	4	6	28	33	−5	12
7	Club América	14	4	1	9	41	53	−12	9
8	Asturias FC	14	4	1	9	30	42	−12	9

Source: RSSSF

The playoff match to define the title was held at Parque Asturias on May 10, 1942.

- Playoff match: RC España 5-4 Atlante FC

=== Top goalscorers ===
Player	Club	Goals
(Costa Rica) Rafael Meza	Moctezuma de Orizaba	20
