= Ángel Faretta =

Argentine writer (born 1953)

- Born: 21 April 1953 (age 73); Buenos Aires, Argentina
- Occupations: Novelist, playwright, short story writer, poet, film critic
- Writing career
- Period: 1980–2009
- Genres: Fiction, essay

Ángel Faretta (Buenos Aires, Argentina, 1953) is an Argentine writer, film and art scholar, poet, poetry translator, and narrator. Since 1977, he has published essays and analytical and critical articles on art, literature, and cinema in different media. His followers considerer him one of the insightful, influential, and consummate theoreticians of cinema in Argentina. Film critic and screenwriter Fernando Regueira wrote, "Faretta is the only thinker with his own theory of cinema--and a general aesthetics--in our country and, perhaps, in the whole Spanish-speaking world".

== Biography and Work ==
He was born in Buenos Aires on April 21, 1953. He is from a traditional Italian family. His father, Donato (1900-1988), emigrated to Argentina in 1926, where he engaged in rural work in the region of the family property in Saladillo and then in industry and construction. His mother, Lisa Pingitore (1914-1988), born in Argentina, also descended from a very traditional family from the south of Italy of noble ancestry, especially through the maternal line of the Di Renzo family. Faretta did his primary and secondary studies with the Piarist Fathers at the Calasanz School in Caballito. He studied philosophy, theology, aesthetics, history of art and religion, as well as traditional symbolism with Gillo Dorfles and Guido Aristarco in Italy, and with Adolfo Carpio, Conrado Eggers Lan, Antonio Pagés Larraya, and Héctor Ciocchini in Argentina, among others. In Faretta's words;

"In those years, secondary school, at least the one I attended, provided a comprehensive education. Latin, theology, philosophy, literature, and, most importantly, the interaction with teachers.."

Faretta has been teaching privately for four decades, developing his theory in seminars, conferences and in a number of private courses. He has declined university engagements in his country.

== Books ==
- Datos tradicionales (Traditional Data, 1993), poems.
- El concepto del cine (The Concept of Cinema, 2005), a summary of his theory on cinema.
- El saber del cuatro (The Knowledge of the Four, 2005), short stories.
- Espíritu de simetría (Spirit of Symmetry, 2008), a compilation of essays published in Fierro magazine in the 1980s and 1990s.
- Tempestad y asalto (Storm and Stress, 2009), a novel.
- La pasión manda. De la condición y representación melodramáticas (Passion Rules. On the Melodramatic Condition and Representation, 2010), an essay.
- Cinco films argentinos (Five Argentine Films, 2012), a book of essays in collaboration with Fernando Regueira, Sebastián Nuñez, Alberto Tricarico y Guillermo Jacubowicz about the classic films Rosaura a las diez, Más allá del olvido, Mujeres que trabajan, Historia de una noche y Safo, historia de una pasión.
- La cosa en cine. Motivos y figuras (The thing in cinema. Motives and figures, 2013), essays.
- Viajeros que huyen (Fleeing Travellers, 2016), novel.
- Poems and translations on the blog "otra iglesia es imposible".
- Essays and studies on sites such as www.angelfaretta.com.ar; "Aquilea liberada" y en "Tapados, raros, fallidos y olvidados".
