= Basque Country national football team =

Sports team in Spain

Basque Country
- Association: Euskadiko Futbol Federakundea
- Head coach: Jagoba Arrasate
- Most caps: 1930s: Isidro Lángara (44); Modern: Xabi Prieto (14)
- Top scorer: 1930s: Isidro Lángara (17); Modern: Aritz Aduriz (13)
First colours	Second colours

First international
- As North Federation: Basque Country 6–1 Catalonia (Bilbao; 3 January 1915); As Basque Country: Catalonia 0–1 Basque Country (Barcelona; 8 June 1930)

Biggest win
- Denmark Workers 1–11 Basque Country (Copenhagen, Denmark; 29 August 1937)

Biggest defeat
- Mexico 8–4 Basque Country (Mexico; 16 October 1938); Basque Country 1–5 Hungary (Vitoria-Gasteiz; 31 August 1980)

The Basque Country national football team (Basque: Euskal Herriko futbol selekzioa) represents the Basque Country in football. It selects players from the entire Basque Country, that is, the Basque Autonomous Community, the Chartered Community of Navarre and the French Basque Country, and is organised by the Basque Football Federation. It is not affiliated with FIFA or UEFA and therefore only allowed to play friendly matches against FIFA or non-FIFA affiliated teams.

The team has been referred to by various names including Euskadiko selekzioa, Euskal Herriko futbol selekzioa, Selección de Euskadi, Vasconia, Equipo Vasco, Euskadi XI and Basque XI. Most of their home matches have been played in the San Mamés Stadium which was replaced in 2013 by the new San Mamés.

The Basque Country has had a football team of its own since 1930. During the Second Spanish Republic, they played firstly under the name of Baskoniako selekzioa (the Vasconia team) and then from 1936 as Euzkadiko selekzioa (the Euskadi team). During Franco's 36-year dictatorship it only played two games. After Franco's death in 1975, the team was reformed using the name Euskadiko selekzioa and from the early 1990s began playing regular friendly matches, usually during La Liga's Christmas break. Up to the present time they have played 40 matches against a wide range of FIFA national teams such as Russia, Nigeria, Uruguay, Serbia, Tunisia, Estonia, Venezuela and Costa Rica, plus others against non-FIFA teams of various types.

In 2007, the team's name was controversially changed to Euskal Herriko futbol Selekzioa causing disagreements which led to the annual matches being cancelled. In 2008, a compromise was reached and it was changed again to Euskal selekzioa.

In the lower grades (such as in the Spanish regional championship for youths and the UEFA Regions' Cup for amateurs), the team is either called Euskadiko selekzioa or Seleccíon del País Vasco and exclusively represents the Basque Country autonomous community (Euskadi), with Navarre competing separately.

== History ==
=== Beginnings, the North team (1913) ===
On 29 September 1913 the Royal Spanish Football Federation was formally created and along with it four regional federations (Norte, Oeste, Este and Centro). Each regional federation organised its own league, and also selected a team to play against other regions. The Basque Country was grouped with Cantabria in 'Norte' (North). As most of the biggest teams in the Norte federation were Basque, such as Athletic Bilbao, Real Sociedad, Real Unión, and Arenas Club de Getxo, the team fielded by the federation was often composed entirely of Basque players, and was called 'Vasconia', 'el equipo Vasco' (the Basque team), or sometimes just 'Norte'. On 3 January 1915 they played their first match which was against Catalonia in Bilbao and won 6–1, and then on 7 February they played them again but in Barcelona, this time drawing 2–2. In May 1915 they won the inaugural Copa del Príncipe de Asturias tournament in Madrid after beating Catalonia 1–0 with a goal from Legarreta and then holding the hosts, 'Centro' (a Castile/Madrid XI), to a 1–1 draw, in which the author of the Basque goal was Patricio. In the same competition they drew 1–1 with. In May 1916, 'Norte' faced Catalonia twice in Barcelona, winning by 1–3 on the 21st, and drawing 0–0 on the 22nd. On 4 June of the same year they beat Catalonia 5–0 in Bilbao.

On 22 November 1916 the Cantabrian teams left the North Federation, joining the newly formed Cantabrian Federation (Federación Cantábrica de Clubes de Football), which encompassed Asturian and Cantabrian clubs. This Asturias/Cantabria XI participated in the 1917 and 1918 editions of the Copa del Príncipe de Asturias, finishing third and second respectively. In 1918 the province of Gipuzkoa formed its own federation and its own team, leaving the province of Biscay on their own in Federation Norte. In 1919 the Asturians decided to form their own federation (Federación Regional Asturiana de Clubes de Fútbol) so the Cantabrian teams rejoined 'Norte', but now it only had teams from Cantabria and Biscay. This complicated situation of federations splitting off continued for a few more years. In 1922 separate teams were created for Biscay and Cantabria because the former decided to form their own federation (Biscayan Federation).

In the summer of 1922 a team calling itself 'the Basque team' (Equipo Vasco) was sent to South America. Although the trip was organised by the Gipuzkoan federation, 4 of the 19 players in the squad were from the Biscayan federation. They played once against the Argentine national side, losing 4–0, then drew 1–1 against Porteño, and finally winning 0–4 against a team selected from Argentina's interior league. The team also played the Uruguayan national side twice, losing both games, before visiting Brazil where they played in São Paulo and Rio de Janeiro. After the team had arrived back in Spain on 5 October 1922, the players resumed playing for either Biscay or Gipuzkoa. Both Gipuzkoa and Biscay participated in the 1922-23 and 1923-24 Copa del Príncipe de Asturias, with the later reaching the semi-finals of the 1923-24 edition after defeating Asturias in Bilbao 4–2 thanks to a second-half brace from Travieso, but then lost to eventual champions Catalonia, who had already eliminated Gipuzkoa from the competition.

=== The first Basque team (1930) ===
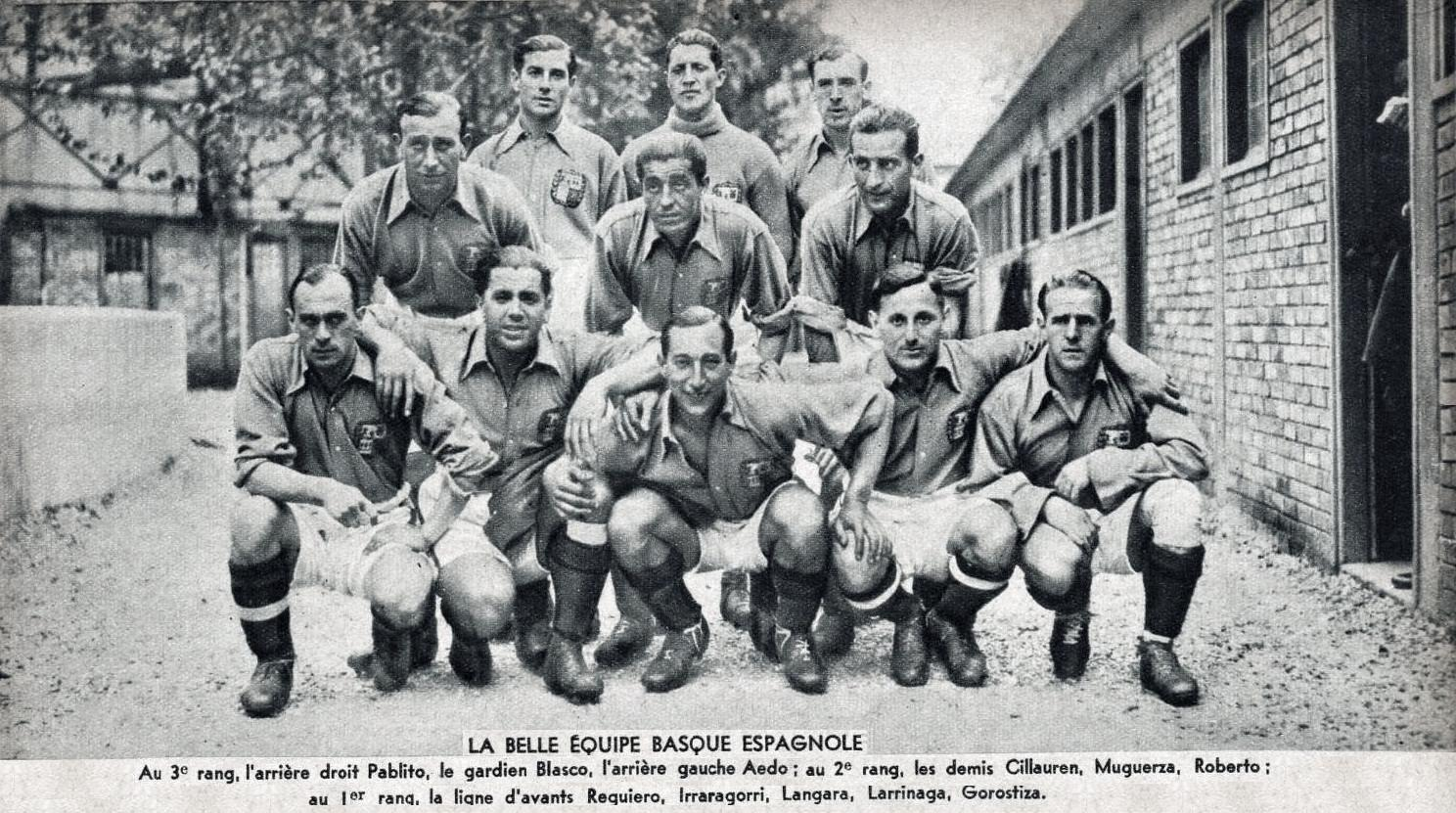
The Basque team in France at the beginning of their European tour, April 1937

It wasn't until 1930 that the Biscayan and Gipuzkoan federations finally came together to create the first permanent team with the name 'Vasconia' ('Baskoniako selekzioa') to represent the Basque Country. Their first game was against Catalonia on 8 June 1930, which they won by 0–1 in Montjuïc, and they played Catalonia again on 1 January 1931 in Bilbao, winning that match 3–2.

During the first year of the Spanish Civil War the Basque team changed its name to Euzkadiko selekzioa. Their first match with that name was against Cantabria on 29 November 1936 in Santander, when the Cantabrians won 3–2. In 1937 the first president of the Basque autonomous region José Antonio Aguirre, who in his youth had been a player for Athletic Bilbao, decided to send a Basque football team abroad with the dual aim of raising money to fund the cost of the civil war, and also as a form of propaganda letting the world know about the conflict in Spain. At the same time a choir called Eresoinka was formed to tour Europe for the same purpose. Money raised was reportedly used to fund a hospital in La Rosarie, France, used by Spanish refugees, and also to help support the thousands of Basque children who had been sent abroad for safety.

The team consisted of the following players:

- Goalkeepers: Gregorio Blasco (Athletic) and Rafael Eguzkiza (Arenas);
- Defenders: Serafín Aedo (Betis), Pedro Areso (Barcelona) and Pablito Barcos (Barakaldo);
- Midfield: Leonardo Cilaurren (Athletic), Jose Muguerza (Athletic), Pedro Regueiro (Madrid), Roberto Etxebarria Arruti (Athletic), Ángel Zubieta (Athletic), Tomas Agirre (Nîmes) and Enrique Larrinaga (Racing);
- Forwards: Jose Iraragorri (Athletic), Emilio Alonso (Madrid), Isidro Lángara (Oviedo), Luis Regueiro (Madrid), Ignacio Agirrezabala (Chirri II) (no team), José Manuel Urquiola (Athletic Madrid), Guillermo Gorostiza (Athletic);
- Coach: Pedro Vallana

Also attached to the team were Perico Birichinaga, as a masseur, and Ricardo Irezábal and Manu de la Sota, both as delegates.

The team made its debut on Monday 26 April 1937 in Paris's Parc des Princes against the French champions, Racing Paris, winning 0–3. This happened to be the same day that Guernica was bombed by Nazi Germany's Luftwaffe. In May 1937 they toured France beating Olympique Marseille 2–5, losing 3–1 to Sète, and playing Racing Paris twice more, 3–3 and 2–3.

In May 1937, the team began to have problems with FIFA. Due to the civil war in Spain FIFA had banned all FIFA-affiliated countries and clubs from playing any Spanish teams. A match due to take place on 30 May in the Netherlands against Rotterdam was cancelled by the Dutch Federation. But many clubs and national sides continued to play the Basque team because they sympathised with Republican Spain which the team symbolised. The team's first match against a nation from outside of Spain was a 3–2 defeat, also in May 1937, to Czechoslovakia, who had been runners up in the 1934 World Cup. In June, they played Czechoslovakia again losing 2–1. Then they played Silesia in Chorzów on 9 June.

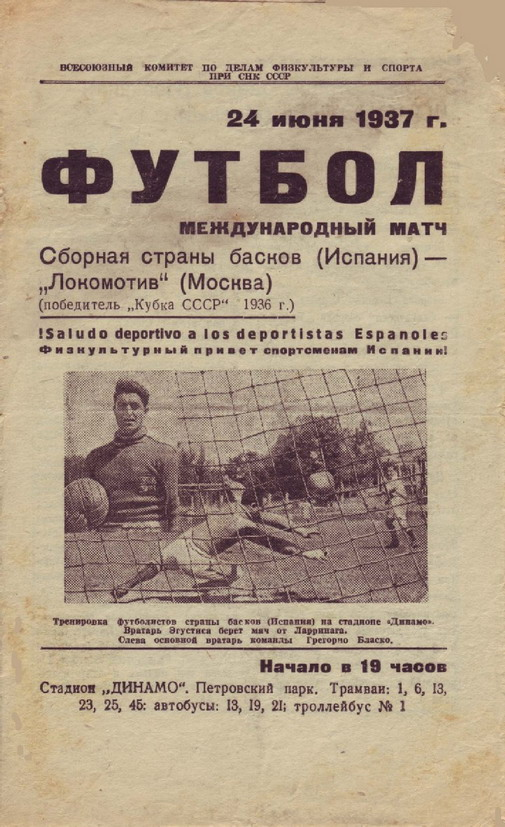
poster advertising the first match in the USSR against Locomotiv Moscow.

When Bilbao was captured by Franco's forces on 19 June 1937 the Basque team were in Moscow, having been invited by the Soviet Union's Politburo due to political motivations. They then toured the country during that summer, playing against Lokomotiv Moscow (1–5), Dynamo Moscow twice (1–2) and (4–7), Dinamo Leningrad (2–2), Spartak Moscow (6–2), Dynamo Kiev (1–3), Dinamo Tbilisi (0–2), the Georgian football team (1–3), and finally Dinamo Minsk (1–6). Their only loss was against Spartak Moscow. The Soviet authorities were determined to win the final game in Moscow, so the Spartak team was improved by bringing players from other parts of the country to play for the team just for that match. Lastly they travelled to Norway and Denmark in August where they beat an Østfold select (2-3), Norwegian AIF (1–3), and completed their biggest win to date against Denmark's DAI (1–11).

In the autumn of 1937 the team crossed the Atlantic to play in Mexico where FIFA had given them permission to play clubs and the national side. FC Barcelona had undertaken a similar tour a few months earlier. After playing nine matches in the capital and one in Guadalajara they crossed over to Cuba where their problems with FIFA got worse. FIFA demanded that Cuba should not play the Basque Country. So the Basque team only played club sides, playing four matches, winning one and losing two. Next they travelled to Argentina, arriving on 25 February 1938. They stayed there for three months but officially played no matches due to their problems with FIFA. As they had run out of money and had no way of raising any, many of the big Argentine sides raised money for them. They then crossed the Andes to Valparaíso, Chile, where on 9 May 1938 they played Santiago Wanderers, but the result is not known. Later in May they travelled again to Cuba, this time playing the Cuba national team twice, before returning to Mexico. In the 1938–39 season they played under the name Club Deportivo Euzkadi in the Liga Mexicana de Football Amateur Association, one of the two major leagues in Mexico at that time where they won 7, drew 1 and lost 4 games, eventually coming runners up in the league. The Spanish civil war ended in April 1939 so when the season ended the team was broken up and as a reward each member received 10,000 pesetas. Most of the players stayed on in the Americas and joined teams there.

=== Franco years (1939–1975) ===
Between 1939 and 1975 the Basque football team played only twice due to General Franco's dictatorship which severely limited the freedoms previously enjoyed by the regions of Spain. The first time was on 25 June 1966 on the 50th anniversary of Real Unión's founding. A team made up of players from the Basque Country played Real Madrid in the Gal Stadium in Irun, losing 0–2. Playing for the Basque Country were Carmelo Cedrún, (Alarcia), Gorriti, Martínez, Marigil, (Zabala), Azcárate, (Iruretagoyena), Iguarán, Amas, Dionisio Urreizti, Landa, (Chapela), Mauri, (Mendiluce) and Erro. Don Santiago Bernabéu had the honour of kicking off.

The second time was in San Mamés, Bilbao, on 21 February 1971 when a memorial match for Juan Gardeazábal was played between the Basque Country and Catalonia. The Basque Country lost 1–2. Playing for the Basque Country were Zamora, Deusto, Irusquieta, Zugazaga, Echeberría, Lema, Guisasola, Estéfano, Santamaría, Arambarri, Ibáñez, Marañon, Fernando Ansola, Araquistáin, Rojo II, Urtiaga, and Ortuondo.

=== Revival (1978) ===
The first game following the dictatorship was played on 2 March 1978 in San Mamés against the USSR. The team were called the 'Selección Vasca' and drew 0–0.

On 16 August 1979 they played under the name 'Euskadiko selekzioa' for the first time since 1938 at San Mames stadium during the Great Week of Bilbao, winning 4–1 against a League of Ireland XI. Controversy was caused before the match by the Spanish government deciding that the song of the Basque football team (Gernikako Arbola – The Tree of Guernica) should not be sung before the game. This resulted in Carlos Garaikoetxea (the Lehendakari, head of the Basque regional parliament), the presidents of the regional councils and the mayors of the Basque capitals, all leaving the presidential box to sit elsewhere in the stadium to show their protest. CA Osasuna was the only club with players called up for the match who refused to release them. Iraragorri and Langara (two players from the 1937 team) kicked off, and Iribar served as captain. The game was played as a fundraiser for a campaign promoting the Basque language called "Bai Euskarari", organized by Sustraiak, as a response to its suppression during the dictatorship.

A few months later the Basque team won again, 4–0 against Bulgaria in San Sebastián's Atotxa Stadium. In 1980, in Vitoria, they lost 1–5 to Hungary. Other key matches included defeats to Cameroon (0–1) and Wales (0–1), and victory over Serbia (4–0). Then, in 2007, after 69 years without playing outside Spain, the Basque Country faced Venezuela in San Cristóbal, winning 4–3. Prior to this, their last game outside Spain had been in June 1939, in the Spanish Civil War era against Club Atlético Corrales in Mexico City.

=== Name change (2007) ===
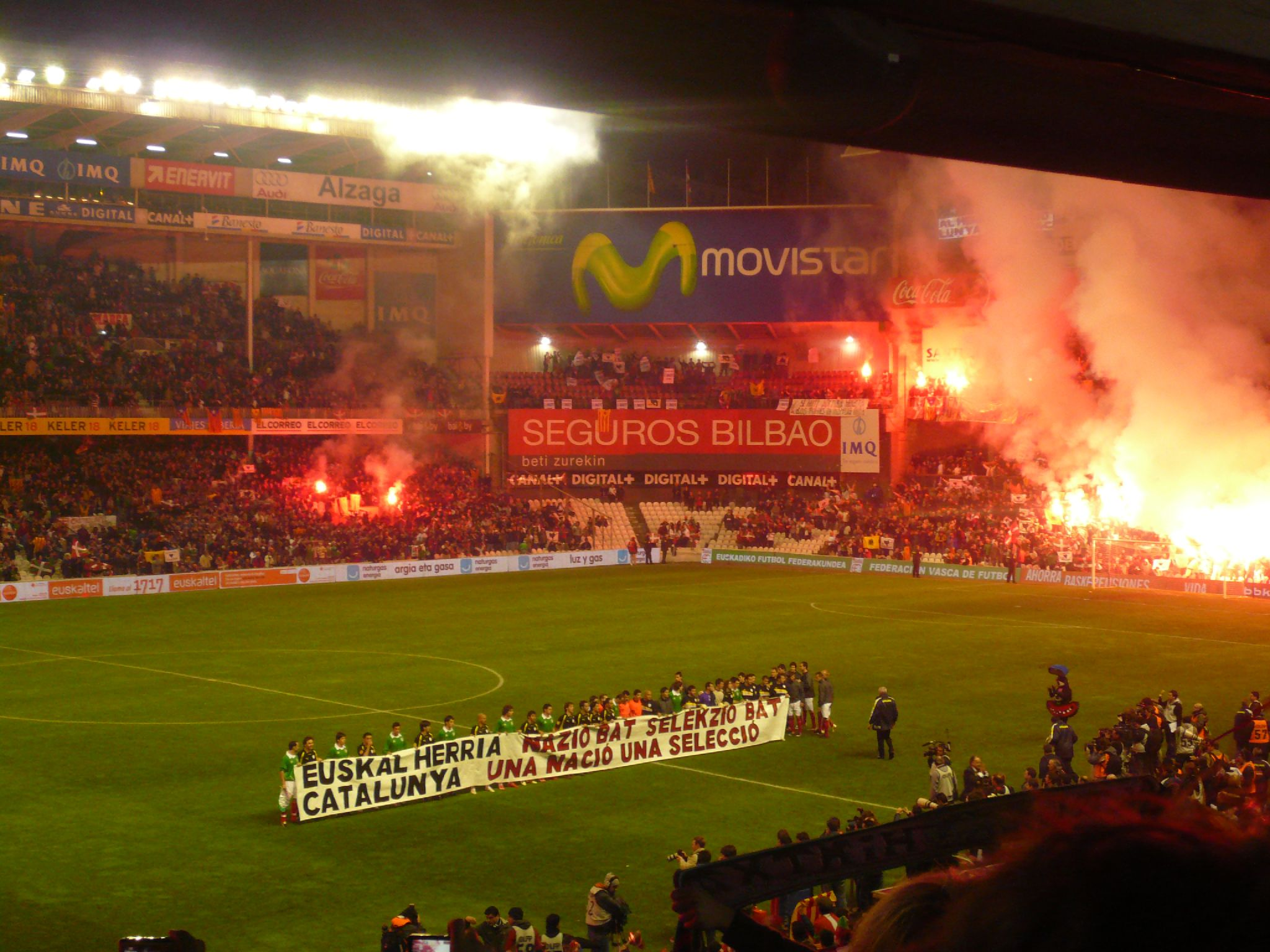
The Basque and Catalan teams in 2007 holding a banner asking for official recognition of their teams

In 2007 the team's name was changed to 'Euskal Herria' (Euskal Herriko Futbol Selekzioa), and on 29 December they played a match against Catalonia in San Mames. The result was Euskal Herria 1, Catalonia 1.

The name change, driven by the Basque Football Federation, was denounced by politicians from the Basque Nationalist Party (PNV), including the Lehendakari, Juan José Ibarretxe, and also the main Spanish political parties such as the Partido Popular (PP) and PSOE. For this reason the Basque Football Federation proposed returning to the team's previous name, 'Euskadi' (Euskadiko Selekzioa), for the match scheduled for December 2008 against Iran. 165 Basque players signed a statement announcing that they would not play unless the team was called 'Euskal Herria'. The controversy went beyond the sports arena and against this statement were positioned many political parties such as the PNV, PSE-PSOE and PP, and supporting it were Eusko Alkartasuna, Ezker Batua and Eusko Abertzale Ekintza. At the heart of this dispute were the meanings of the two terms 'Euskadi' and 'Euskal Herria'. For the politicians of the PNV who favoured the name 'Euskadi', they saw this as the historic name used by the Basque football team since the 1930s and geographically they said it always included the Spanish Basque Country and the French Basque Country and (from where the players are selected), but to the players and the politicians supporting them, only the term 'Euskal Herria' had this geographic meaning and to them 'Euskadi' only referred to the Basque Autonomous Community, that is the Basque provinces in Spain excluding Navarre. This difference of opinion encompassed the nuances of the names, their history known or unknown, and changing public opinions towards what name should be used when referring to all people of Basque culture. In the end the match was cancelled.

In 2009 a consensus was reached to use the name 'Euskal Selekzioa'. However, discrepancies between the federation, players and ESAIT led to the match, scheduled again to be played against Iran, not to be played. In 2010 however, although there was still no agreement between players and federation, the players agreed to play the match to be played on 29 December in San Mames, between the Basque Country and Venezuela, which ended 3–1. At this match the gold badge of honour of the Basque Football Federation was presented to Joseba Etxeberria, former player of Athletic Club Bilbao, for being the most capped player of the Basque team, and he was allowed to take the kick-off.

=== Recent activity ===
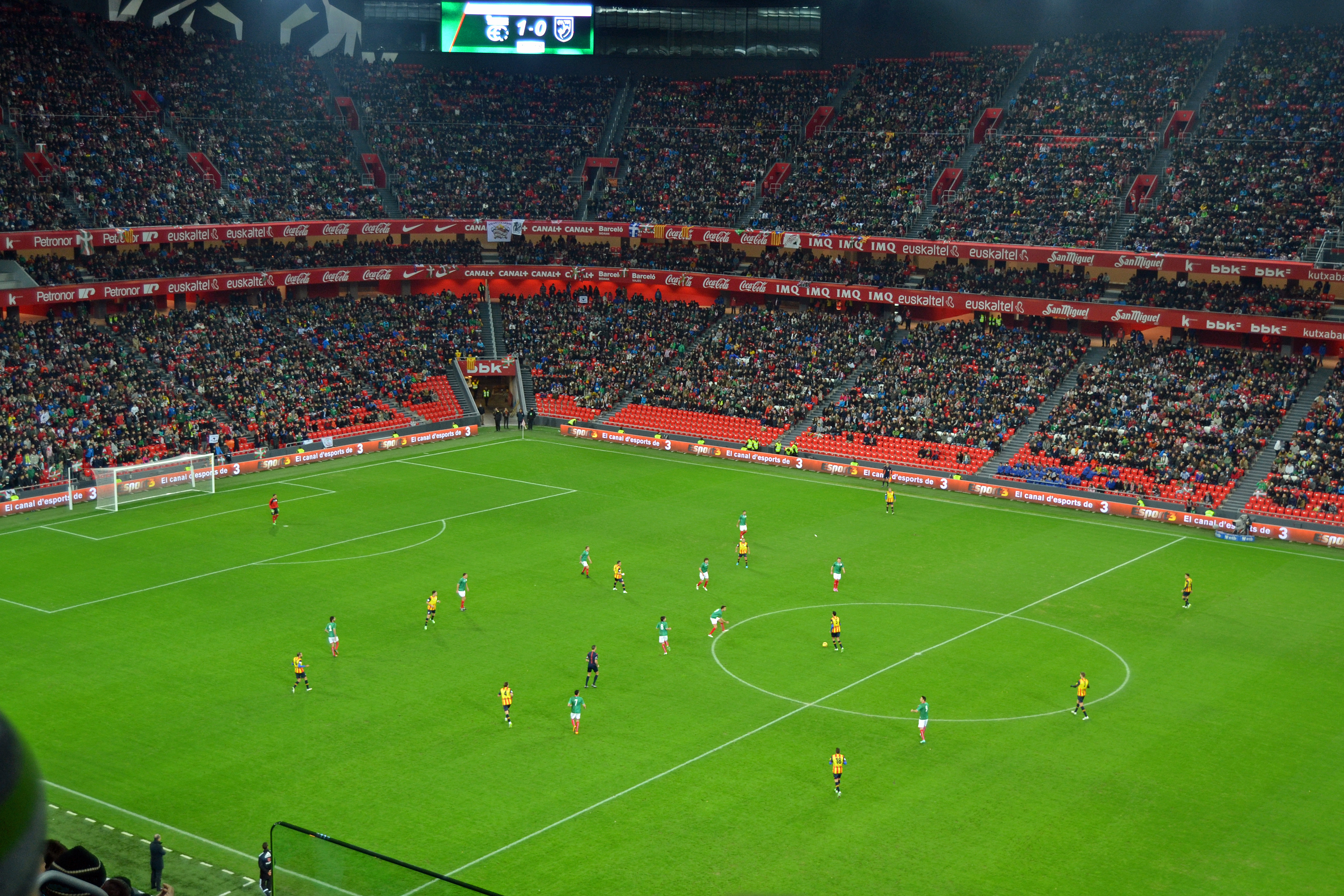
The Basque Country playing Catalonia in San Mames, 28 December 2014

In 2011 the Basque football team played two matches. Firstly on 25 May they visited Estonia, winning 1–2, then on 28 December they played their last game in the old San Mamés against Tunisia, losing 0–2.

In December 2012 they played Bolivia in San Sebastián, winning 6–1.

On 28 December 2013, the Basque team played its first match in the new San Mames stadium against Peru winning 6–0.

On 28 December 2014, a centenary match was played in San Mames against Catalonia to celebrate 100 years since the first match between these two sides. The game ended 1–1. The same teams played a year later, with Aritz Aduriz scoring the only goal in a 1–0 Basque win in Barcelona.

In October 2017, the federation confirmed that the Basque team would not play a friendly in late December that year as had become traditional (for reasons including scheduling difficulties, credibility in the football community and a noted decline in attendances at the festive matches), but instead would look to schedule a fixture during one of the FIFA International Match Calendar dates, possibly in March 2018. However, a proposed meeting with Chile did not come to pass. Eventually, a fixture was arranged for the Basque team to face Venezuela in October 2018 at Mendizorroza, which they won 4–2.

The Basques' summer 2019 fixture away to Panama did little to enhance their credentials. Scheduled ten days after the 2018–19 La Liga season had ended but prior to the second division's conclusion, various factors meant experienced players were reluctant to put themselves forward for the long trip across the Atlantic, and the small squad was augmented with promising youngsters, including four who had never played at a higher level than the regional third tier with Athletic Bilbao's reserves. The match itself, described in the press as "boring at times", "bland" and "poor", petered out into a goalless draw in humid conditions, although both coaches stated they were satisfied with the outcome and the effort shown.

Veteran coach Javier Clemente became manager of the Basque Selection in March 2019. At his presentation, he spoke of plans to invite players with Basque heritage (including those from other parts of Spain like Marco Asensio) to play for the team, in line with the grandfather rule used by FIFA national teams.

A provisional announcement was made for a fixture against Argentina in October 2019, but this was never confirmed by the opposition federation and was soon cancelled officially. With no December fixture forthcoming, but UEFA Euro 2020 international matches to be played in Bilbao, it was reported that the Basque team may be able to arrange a match against one of the qualified teams who would meet Spain there (Poland or Sweden) as part of their preparations before the tournament. However, the tournament was delayed due to the COVID-19 pandemic. The next Basque fixture was played in November 2020 against Costa Rica in a closed doors setting due to the issue; the Basque team won the match 2–1. With the pandemic still ongoing in late 2021 (earlier causing the Euro fixtures to be moved from Bilbao to Seville), the Basque federation confirmed there would be no festive match that year, but an attempt would be made to arrange one for March 2022. Eventually the next match took place in March 2024, a draw against Uruguay.

On 15 November 2025 they took the field in a friendly against the Palestine national football team at the San Mamés Stadium of Bilbao winning 3-0, in a match organized to bring solidarity to the Palestinian population, condemn the genocide in the Gaza Strip and highlight the incompatibility of the presence of the State of Israel in international sports competitions in support of the Boycott campaign.

== FIFA and UEFA membership ==
Due to the unofficial status of the Basque Country team and others, many of the usual conventions of international football do not apply. Players who have already appeared for a FIFA national team can play for the Basques in addition, but if they are simultaneously called up for both, the FIFA squad (usually Spain) takes precedence. Clubs are also not obligated to release their players, and the request is sometimes refused by clubs outside the Spanish leagues, or when the fixture takes place during the domestic season and the club has important upcoming fixtures. Eligible players can also choose not to be involved. This means the Basque squads are frequently below what would be considered their 'full strength', but also means those who do take part are fully committed to the concept, and in many cases would have no other opportunities to experience international football so consider the match to be an important matter. This contrasts with their opponents, as the fixture does not contribute to their Association ranking points or individual cap totals and is thus one of the least significant matches out of several they would play each year. In combination with home advantage for the Basque team in most of their fixtures, this has led to the results falling in their favour more often than might be expected compared to other nations perceived to have a similar standard of players.

Several organisations including the Basque Government and the Basque Football Federation are trying to persuade FIFA and UEFA to accept the Basque Country as an affiliated member. There is a lot of support for this within the Basque Country, with recent polls showing up to 63,5% of basques support the idea (including the French Basque Country and Navarre).

The United Kingdom provides one model for a sovereign state with more than one FIFA member, while the Faroe Islands is an example of an autonomous constituent country having a separate football team to the national team (Denmark).

In late 2018, the Basque Football Federation voted in favour of applying to FIFA and UEFA for official recognition for the team.

In December 2020, Basque federation applied for UEFA and FIFA recognition.

== Results and fixtures ==
=== 2024 ===
23 March 2024	Basque Country	1–1	Uruguay	Bilbao
	Djaló 44'	Report	Vecino 46'	Stadium: San Mamés Stadium

=== 2025 ===
15 November 2025	Basque Country	3–0	Palestine	Bilbao
20:30	Elgezabal 5'; Guruzeta 43'; Izeta 77'	Report		Stadium: San Mamés Stadium; Attendance: 51,396; Referee: Jon Ander González (Basque Country)

=== 2026 ===
14 November 2026	Basque Country	1–0	Venezuela	Bilbao
20:00	Mikel Jauregizar 27'	Report		Stadium: San Mamés Stadium; Attendance: 40,041; Referee: Ricardo de Burgos Bengoetxea (Basque Country)

== Coaches ==
- Amadeo García, 1930–1931
- Pedro Vallana, 1937–1938
- Koldo Aguirre, 1978
- Jesús Garay and Andoni Elizondo, 1979
- José Antonio Irulegui, 1980
- José Ángel Iribar and Xabier Expósito, 1988
- Jesús Aranguren, 1990
- José Ángel Iribar and Xabier Expósito, 1993–2001
- José Ángel Iribar, 2002
- José Ángel Iribar and Mikel Etxarri, 2003–2011
- Javier Irureta and Mikel Etxarri, 2011
- José María Amorrortu and Mikel Etxarri, 2011–2018
- Javier Clemente, 2019–2020
- Jagoba Arrasate, 2024–

== Players ==
For a list of recent Basque Country national team players, see here.
For a list of players from the Basque region who have represented FIFA national teams, see here

=== Current squad ===
The following players were called up for the friendly match against Venezuela, on 14 November 2026.

Caps and goals correct as of 14 November 2026 after the match against Venezuela.

Head coach: Jagoba Arrasate

No.	Pos.	Player	Date of birth (age)	Caps	Goals	Club
13	GK	Unai Marrero	9 October 2001 (age 25)	2	0	(Basque Football Federation) Real Sociedad
1	GK	Kepa Arrizabalaga	3 October 1994 (age 32)	1	0	(The Football Association) Arsenal FC
3	DF	Aihen Muñoz	16 August 1997 (age 29)	4	0	(Basque Football Federation) Real Sociedad
12	DF	Andoni Gorosabel	4 August 1996 (age 30)	2	0	(Catalan Football Federation) Espanyol
16	DF	Jon Pacheco	9 January 2001 (age 25)	2	0	(Basque Football Federation) Real Sociedad
5	DF	Igor Zubeldia	30 March 1997 (age 29)	2	0	(Basque Football Federation) Real Sociedad
2	DF	Iñigo Arguibide	19 April 2005 (age 21)	1	0	(Basque Football Federation) Osasuna
4	DF	Einar Galilea	22 May 1994 (age 32)	1	0	(Royal Spanish Football Federation) Málaga CF
21	DF	Johaneko Louis-Jean	28 June 2004 (age 22)	1	0	(Basque Football Federation) Athletic Bilbao
6	MF	Ander Guevara	7 July 1997 (age 29)	4	0	(Basque Football Federation) Deportivo Alavés
17	MF	Jon Guridi	28 February 1995 (age 31)	2	0	(Basque Football Federation) Deportivo Alavés
19	MF	Pablo Ibáñez	20 September 1998 (age 28)	2	0	(Basque Football Federation) Deportivo Alavés
18	MF	Mikel Jauregizar	13 November 2003 (age 23)	2	1	(Basque Football Federation) Athletic Bilbao
22	MF	Gaizka Larrazabal	17 December 1997 (age 28)	2	0	(The Football Association) Bolton Wanderers
10	MF	Iñigo Vicente	6 January 1998 (age 28)	2	0	(Royal Spanish Football Federation) Racing Santander
20	MF	Unai Gómez	25 May 2003 (age 23)	1	0	(Italian Football Federation) Udinese
15	MF	Asier Osambela	30 October 2004 (age 22)	1	0	(Basque Football Federation) Osasuna
14	MF	Beñat Prados	8 February 2001 (age 25)	1	0	(Basque Football Federation) Athletic Bilbao
8	MF	Oihan Sancet	25 April 2000 (age 26)	1	0	(Basque Football Federation) Athletic Bilbao
7	MF	Beñat Turrientes	31 January 2002 (age 24)	1	0	(Basque Football Federation) Real Sociedad
9	FW	Asier Villalibre	30 September 1997 (age 29)	4	0	(Royal Spanish Football Federation) Racing Santander
11	FW	Kike Barja	1 April 1997 (age 29)	2	0	(Basque Football Federation) Osasuna

=== Recent callups ===
The following players were called up to or played for the Basque Country in recent matches and are still eligible to represent.

Pos.	Player	Date of birth (age)	Caps	Goals	Club	Latest call-up
GK	Aitor Fernández	3 May 1991 (age 35)	3	0	(Basque Country (autonomous community)) Osasuna	v. Venezuela, 14 November 2026 ^{PRE}
GK	Julen Agirrezabala	26 December 2000 (age 25)	1	0	(Spain) Racing Santander	v. Uruguay, 23 March 2024
DF	Hugo Rincón	27 January 2003 (age 23)	1	0	(Basque Country (autonomous community)) Athletic Bilbao	v. Venezuela, 14 November 2026 ^{PRE}
DF	Daniel Vivian	5 July 1999 (age 27)	1	0	(Basque Country (autonomous community)) Athletic Bilbao	v. Venezuela, 14 November 2026 ^{PRE}
DF	Unai Elgezabal	25 April 1993 (age 33)	1	1	(Basque Country (autonomous community)) Eibar	v. Palestine, 15 November 2025
DF	Unai García	3 February 1992 (age 34)	1	0	(Greece) Panetolikos	v. Palestine, 15 November 2025
DF	Jorge Herrando	28 February 2001 (age 25)	1	0	(Basque Country (autonomous community)) Osasuna	v. Palestine, 15 November 2025
DF	Álvaro Núñez	7 July 2000 (age 26)	1	0	(Galicia (Spain)) Celta de Vigo	v. Palestine, 15 November 2025
DF	Yuri Berchiche	10 February 1990 (age 36)	6	0	(Basque Country (autonomous community)) Athletic Bilbao	v. Palestine, 15 November 2025 ^{PRE}
DF	Aritz Elustondo	28 March 1994 (age 32)	3	1	(Greece) PAOK	v. Palestine, 15 November 2025^{PRE}
DF	Martín Aguirregabiria	10 May 1996 (age 30)	2	0	(Basque Country (autonomous community)) Mirandés	v. Uruguay, 23 March 2024
DF	Imanol García de Albéniz	8 June 2000 (age 26)	1	0	(Basque Country (autonomous community)) Eibar	v. Uruguay, 23 March 2024
DF	Urko González de Zarate	20 March 2001 (age 25)	1	0	(Catalonia) Espanyol	v. Uruguay, 23 March 2024
MF	Oier Zarraga	4 January 1999 (age 27)	2	0	(Italy) Udinese	v. Palestine, 15 November 2025
MF	Jon Gorrotxategi	2 February 2002 (age 24)	1	0	(Basque Country (autonomous community)) Real Sociedad	v. Palestine, 15 November 2025
MF	Iván Martín	14 February 1999 (age 27)	1	0	(Spain) Racing Santander	v. Palestine, 15 November 2025 ^{PRE}
MF	Iñigo Ruiz de Galarreta	6 August 1993 (age 33)	1	0	(Basque Country (autonomous community)) Athletic Bilbao	v. Palestine, 15 November 2025
MF	Nico Serrano	5 March 2003 (age 23)	1	0	(Basque Country (autonomous community)) Athletic Bilbao	v. Palestine, 15 November 2025
MF	Borja Sainz	21 February 2001 (age 25)	0	0	(Portugal) Porto	v. Palestine, 15 November 2025 ^{PRE}
MF	Malcom Adu Ares	12 October 2001 (age 25)	1	0	(Basque Country (autonomous community)) Eibar	v. Uruguay, 23 March 2024
MF	Dani García	24 May 1990 (age 36)	5	0	(Greece) Atromitos	v. Uruguay, 23 March 2024
MF	Mikel Vesga	8 April 1993 (age 33)	2	0	(Spain) Almería	v. Uruguay, 23 March 2024
MF	Jon Moncayola	13 May 1998 (age 28)	1	0	(Basque Country (autonomous community)) Osasuna	v. Uruguay, 23 March 2024
MF	Jon Ander Olasagasti	16 August 2000 (age 26)	1	0	(Spain) Levante	v. Uruguay, 23 March 2024
MF	Álex Sola	9 June 1999 (age 27)	1	0	(Spain) Almería	v. Uruguay, 23 March 2024
MF	Roberto Torres	7 March 1989 (age 37)	5	1	(Spain) Orihuela	v. Uruguay, 23 March 2024
FW	Gorka Guruzeta	12 September 1996 (age 30)	1	1	(Basque Country (autonomous community)) Athletic Bilbao	v. Palestine, 15 November 2025
FW	Urko Izeta	29 September 1999 (age 27)	1	1	(Spain) Cádiz	v. Palestine, 15 November 2025
FW	Álvaro Djaló	16 August 1999 (age 27)	1	1	(Basque Country (autonomous community)) Athletic Bilbao	v. Uruguay, 23 March 2024

Álava	Biscay	Gipuzkoa	Labourd	Lower Navarre	Navarre	Soule

== All-time team record ==
=== Record vs FIFA national teams ===
- Including 1922 South America tour

As of 15 November 2025

Opponent	Pld	W	D	L	GF	GA	GD	Win % (Note: A draw counts as a ½ win)
Argentina	1	0	0	1	0	4	–4	0%
Bolivia	2	2	0	0	9	2	+7	100%
Bulgaria	1	1	0	0	4	0	+4	100%
Cameroon	1	0	0	1	0	1	−1	0%
Costa Rica	1	1	0	0	2	1	+1	100%
Cuba	2	2	0	0	8	3	+5	100%
Estonia	2	2	0	0	5	2	+3	100%
Ghana	1	1	0	0	3	2	+1	100%
Honduras	1	1	0	0	2	0	+2	100%
Hungary	1	0	0	1	1	5	−4	0%
North Macedonia	1	0	1	0	2	2	0	50%
Mexico	7	5	0	2	24	16	+8	71.43%
Morocco	1	1	0	0	3	2	+1	100%
Nigeria	1	1	0	0	5	1	+4	100%
Palestine	1	1	0	0	3	0	+3	100%
Panama	1	0	1	0	0	0	0	50%
Paraguay	1	0	1	0	1	1	0	50%
Peru	1	1	0	0	6	0	+6	100%
Romania	1	0	1	0	2	2	0	50%
Russia	1	1	0	0	1	0	+1	100%
Serbia (Note: Includes a friendly match against former FR Yugoslavia on 26 December 1997)	2	2	0	0	7	1	+6	100%
Soviet Union	1	0	1	0	2	2	0	50%
Tunisia	2	1	0	1	3	3	0	50%
Uruguay	5	2	1	2	9	10	–1	40%
Venezuela	3	3	0	0	11	6	+6	100%
Wales	1	0	0	1	0	1	−1	0%
Summary	41	28	5	6	106	63	+43	68.29%

=== Record vs non-FIFA teams / As 'North' region ===
Opponent	Pld	W	D	L	GF	GA	GD	Win % (Note: A draw counts as a ½ win)
Asturias (Note: A combined team of players from Asturias and Cantabria.)	1	1	0	0	6	3	+3	100%
Cantabria	1	0	0	1	2	3	−1	0%
Castile (Note: Matches against the 'Central Federation' (Centro) team, including Madrid and the wider Castile region.)	1	0	1	0	1	1	0	50%
Catalonia	13	7	5	1	26	11	+15	73.08%
Central Bohemia	2	0	0	2	5	9	−4	0%
Corsica	1	0	1	0	1	1	0	50%
Denmark (DAI)	1	1	0	0	11	1	+10	100%
Georgia (GSSR)	1	1	0	0	3	1	+2	100%
Jalisco	3	3	0	0	12	2	+10	100%
Norway (AIF)	2	2	0	0	6	3	+3	100%
Silesia	1	1	0	0	4	3	+1	100%
Summary	27	16	7	4	77	38	+39	71.15%

== Amateur team (UEFA Regions' Cup) ==
Basque Country national amateur football team
- Association: Basque Football Federation (EFF/FVF)
First colours

UEFA Regions' Cup
- Appearances: 2
- Best result: Winners: 2005

Spanish stage of the UEFA Regions' Cup
- Appearances: 10 (first in 1999–2000)
- Best result: Winners: 2003–04 and 2005–06

The Basque Country national amateur football team (Basque: Euskal Herriko futbol selekzioa amateurra) is composed of players from the Tercera División (Group 4) and provincial lower divisions, with eligibility criteria being club (must play for a club in the territory), age (must be between 18 and 35) and amateur status (must never have signed a contract as a professional). At this level, the Basque team only represents the Basque Country (autonomous community), with the Navarre region having their own team along with the other autonomous communities of Spain.

The team plays in the biennial UEFA Regions' Cup; they won the overall pan-European tournament in 2005, having won the preceding Spanish qualifying tournament in 2003–04. Alain Arroyo scored the winning goal in the 2005 final, held in Poland. The Basques retained the Spanish stage title in 2005–06 (hosting the semi-finals and final), but did not progress from their intermediate group in the subsequent 2007 UEFA Regions' Cup. Since then, their results have been less successful.

=== Matches ===
Basque Country score listed first in all matches.

URC edition	Round	Opponent	Score
2001	Spanish first round (1999–00) (Note: Held in Castile and León.)	Castile and León	0–1
2001	Spanish first round (1999–00)	Andalusia	0–0
2001	Spanish first round (1999–00)	Asturias	2–1
2003	Spanish first round (2001–02) (Note: Held in Catalonia.)	Balearic Islands	3–0
2003	Spanish first round (2001–02)	Catalonia	4–1
2003	Spanish quarter-final	Cantabria	1–2
2003	Spanish quarter-final	Cantabria	a1–0
2003	Spanish semi-final (Note: Held in Community of Madrid.)	Murcia	p0–0 (Note: Basque Country won a penalty shootout 4–3.)
2003	Spanish final	Asturias	0–0p (Note: Asturias won a penalty shootout 4–2.)
2005	Spanish first round (2003–04) (Note: Held in Castile-La Mancha.)	(Castilla–La Mancha) Castile-La Mancha	1–0
2005	Spanish first round (2003–04)	Aragon	3–1
2005	Spanish semi-final	Murcia	4–1
2005	Spanish final	Asturias	3–1
2005	European; Intermediate round (Note: Held in Pas-de-Calais.)	Nord-Pas-de-Calais	3–0
2005	European; Intermediate round	(Belgium) Kempen	1–1
2005	European; Intermediate round	(Scotland) Highlands and Islands	5–0
2005	European; Final group (Note: Held in Lesser Poland Voivodeship.)	(Ukraine) KZESO Kakhova	4–1
2005	European; Final group	(Romania) Dacia	2–1
2005	European; Final group	Republic of Ireland	1–3
2005	European Final	(Bulgaria) South-West Sofia	1–0
2007	Spanish first round (2005–06) (Note: Held in Murcia.)	Cantabria	2–0
2007	Spanish first round (2005–06)	Murcia	1–1
2007	Spanish semi-final (Note: Held in Basque Country.)	Castile and León	p1–1 (Note: Basque Country won a penalty shootout 5–4.)
2007	Spanish final	Catalonia	p1–1 (Note: Basque Country won a penalty shootout 3–0.)
2007	European; Intermediate round (Note: Held in Manche.)	(Lithuania) FK Alytis	1–0
2007	European; Intermediate round	Basse-Normandie	1–2
2007	European; Intermediate round	Republic of Ireland	1–1
2009	Spanish first round (2007–08)	Extremadura	0–0
2009	Spanish first round (2007–08)	(Castilla–La Mancha) Castile-La Mancha	1–0
2009	Spanish quarter-final	Asturias	1–1
2009	Spanish quarter-final	Asturias	1–0
2009	Spanish semi-final	Castile and León	2–2p (Note: Castile and León won a penalty shootout 4–2.)
2011	Spanish first round (2009–10) (Note: Held in Galicia.)	Galicia	0–0
2011	Spanish first round (2009–10)	Murcia	2–1
2013	Spanish first round (2011–12) (Note: Held in Valencian Community.)	Valencian Community	0–1
2013	Spanish first round (2011–12)	Catalonia	0–4
2015	Spanish first round (2013–14)	Cantabria	0–0
2015	Spanish first round (2013–14)	Canary Islands	1–0
2015	Spanish quarter-final	Castile and León	0–1
2015	Spanish quarter-final	Castile and León	1–1
2017	Spanish first round (2015–16) (Note: Held in Andalusia.)	Andalusia	1–3
2017	Spanish first round (2015–16)	Canary Islands	2–2
2019	Spanish first round (2017–18)	Aragon	0–1
2019	Spanish first round (2017–18)	Balearic Islands	4–0
2021	Spanish first round (2019–20)	Madrid	2–0
2021	Spanish first round (2019–20)	Canary Islands	0–0
2021	Spanish intermediate final	Galicia	2–3
2025	Spanish first round (2023–24) (Note: Held in Asturias.)	Asturias	0–2
2025	Spanish first round (2023–24)	Murcia	2–2

=== Results summary ===
As of December 2023

Overall				Spanish phase				International phase			
Pld	W	D	L	Pld	W	D	L	Pld	W	D	L
49	21	17	11	39	15	15	9	10	6	2	2

=== Head-to-head against other Autonomous Communities ===
As of December 2023

Team	Pld	W	D	L	GF	GA	GD
Andalusia	2	0	1	1	1	3	-2
Aragon	2	1	0	1	3	2	+1
Asturias	6	3	2	1	7	5	+2
Balearic Islands	2	2	0	0	7	0	+7
Canary Islands	3	1	2	0	3	2	+1
Cantabria	4	2	1	1	4	2	+2
Castile and León	5	0	3	2	4	6	-2
(Castilla–La Mancha) Castile-La Mancha	2	2	0	0	2	0	+2
Catalonia	3	1	1	1	5	6	-1
Ceuta	Never played						
Extremadura	1	0	1	0	0	0	0
Galicia	2	0	1	1	2	3	-1
La Rioja	Never played						
(Community of Madrid) Madrid	1	1	0	0	2	0	+2
Melilla	Never played						
Murcia	5	2	3	0	9	5	+4
Navarre	Never played						
Valencian Community	1	0	0	1	0	1	-1
Total	34	14	13	7	42	28	+14

== Honours ==
Prince of Asturias Cup:

- Champions (1): 1915 (Note: As part of the North team.)
- Runners-up (1): 1918

== See also ==
- Basque Country women's national football team
- C.D. Euzkadi
- Navarre autonomous football team
- List of Basque footballers
- Tour of USSR in 1937 (In Russian)
