= Enrique Larrinaga =

Spanish footballer

Personal information
- Full name: Enrique Larrinaga Esnal
- Date of birth: 20 June 1910
- Place of birth: Sestao, Spain
- Date of death: 8 May 1993 (aged 82)
- Place of death: Mexico City, Mexico
- Position: Left midfielder

Senior career*
Years	Team	Apps	(Gls)
1927–1928	CD Basconia		
1928–1936	Racing Santander	136	(89)
1938–1939	Club Deportivo Euzkadi		
1939–1942	Club Asturias		
1942–1945	Club España		

International career
1933	Spain	1	(1)
1937–1938	Basque Country	33	
- * Club domestic league appearances and goals

Enrique Larrinaga Esnal (Basque: [enˈrike lariˈnaɣa ezˈnal]; 20 June 1910 – 8 May 1993) was a Spanish footballer from Sestao in the Basque Country who played as a midfielder.

== Personal life ==
Larrinaga was born in Sestao in the Basque Country in 1910, but at the age of seven he moved with his family to Basauri. In 1939 he settled in Mexico, where he married Yolanda Aspiazu Suarez with whom he adopted a son called José Manuel.

== Football career ==
Larrinaga started his playing career at Basconia, where he played two seasons, before moving to Racing Santander for the inaugural season of La Liga in 1928. He usually played as a left midfielder. While at Racing the team's greatest success was coming runners up in the 1930/31 season in La Liga.

With the out-break of the Spanish Civil War in 1936 the national football leagues in Spain were put on hold. In the Basque Country a national team was selected to travel abroad to raise money to look after refugees fleeing the civil war and also to let the world know that there was a Basque government trying to resist the attack of the fascist rebels. Larrinaga was selected for this team. First they toured Europe, playing in France, Czechoslovakia, Poland, the Soviet Union, Norway and Denmark. They had great success but in the summer of 1937 the Basque Country was captured by the fascist army and so the team had to make a choice. Two players returned to Spain, but the rest decided to stick together and travel to Mexico to continue the tour there.

Due to the ongoing civil war in Spain FIFA decided in 1938 to prohibit any FIFA affiliated teams from playing the Basque National team, insisting that the players could only continue to play together as a team if they joined a league. As they all still wanted to stay together the team became a club called Club Deportivo Euzkadi that participated in the Primera Fuerza league in Mexico during the 1938/39 season. At the end of that year the members of the team decided to go their separate ways, and so Larrinaga joined a Mexican side called Club Asturias along with two others from the Basque team. In 1942 he made his final move as a player when he joined another Mexican team called Club España.

== Other work ==
After retiring from football he worked for two companies called Homeopática Intregral and Corvamex.
