= Luis Regueiro =

Spanish footballer (1908–1995)

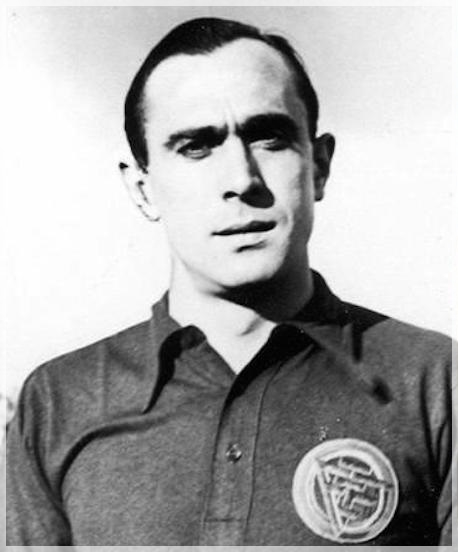

Personal information
- Full name: Luis Regueiro Pagola
- Date of birth: 1 July 1908
- Place of birth: Irún, Gipuzkoa, Spain
- Date of death: 6 December 1995 (aged 87)
- Place of death: Mexico City, Mexico
- Height: 1.72 m (5 ft 7 1/2 in)
- Position: Forward

Senior career*
Years	Team	Apps	(Gls)
1924–1931	Real Unión	53+	(36+)
1931–1936	Madrid FC	92	(53)
1938–1939	C.D. Euzkadi	10	
1940–1942	Asturias F.C.		
1942–1944	Club América		

International career
1927–1936	Spain	25	(16)
1937–1938	Basque Country	40	

Managerial career
- 1942–1945: Club América
- * Club domestic league appearances and goals

Luis Regueiro Pagola (Basque: [luis regeiɾo paɣola] 1 July 1908 – 6 December 1995), sometimes nicknamed Corso, was a footballer, and an Olympian from the Basque Country in the north of Spain who played as a forward.

== Playing career ==
Regueiro began his career in 1924 playing for Real Unión in the Basque Country. He then moved to Madrid FC where he played from 1931 to 1936, scoring 53 goals in 92 matches; from 1932 onwards, his teammates included his younger brother Pedro.

After the start of the Spanish Civil War in 1936 La Liga was suspended. In its place Regueiro was chosen to be captain of the Basque national football team for its tour of Europe. Later, in the 1938–39 season, he and most of the Basque team played under the name CD Euzkadi in Mexico, before moving to other local clubs, Asturias F.C. in the case of Regueiro, and later finishing his career at América where he was a player-manager.

== International football ==
Regueiro played 25 times for Spain, including participating in the World Cup in Italy in 1934 and the 1928 Olympic games.

Later he played 40 times for and captained the Basque national team during its tour of Europe and the Americas.

== Personal life ==
He married Isabel Urquiola in Coyoacán on 11 April 1943. Together they had six children; Luis (who also became a footballer), José Manuel, Juan María, Maite, María Isabel, and Lourdes. After finishing his career in football he had a business dealing in timber which he managed until his death.

Luis younger brother, Pedro, was also a footballer who played for Real Madrid.

== Career statistics ==
=== International goals ===
Scores and results list Spain's goal tally first.

#	Date	Venue	Opponent	Score	Result	Competition
1.	30 May 1928	Amsterdam, Netherlands	Mexico	1–0	7–1	1928 Summer Olympics
2.	30 May 1928	Amsterdam, Netherlands	Mexico	3–0	7–1	1928 Summer Olympics
3.	22 June 1930	Bologna, Italy	Italy	1–0	3–2	Friendly
4.	22 June 1930	Bologna, Italy	Italy	3–1	3–2	Friendly
5.	13 December 1931	Dublin, Ireland	Ireland	3–0	5–0	Friendly
6.	13 December 1931	Dublin, Ireland	Ireland	5–0	5–0	Friendly
7.	24 April 1932	Oviedo, Spain	Yugoslavia	1–0	2–1	Friendly
8.	21 June 1933	Madrid, Spain	Bulgaria	8–0	13–0	Friendly
9.	21 June 1933	Madrid, Spain	Bulgaria	12–0	13–0	Friendly
10.	11 March 1934	Madrid, Spain	Portugal	4–0	9–0	1934 FIFA World Cup qualification
11.	11 March 1934	Madrid, Spain	Portugal	6–0	9–0	1934 FIFA World Cup qualification
12.	21 June 1934	Florence, Italy	Italy	1–0	1–1	1934 FIFA World Cup
13.	24 January 1935	Madrid, Spain	Bulgaria	1–0	2–0	Friendly
14.	19 January 1936	Madrid, Spain	Austria	2–4	4–5	Friendly
15.	19 January 1936	Madrid, Spain	Austria	4–4	4–5	Friendly
16.	23 February 1936	Barcelona, Spain	Germany	1–2	1–2	Friendly

== Honours ==
Madrid FC

- Copa del Rey (2): 1936, 1946
- Campeonato Mancomunados (6): 1930–31, 1931–32, 1932–33, 1933–34, 1934–35, 1935–36
