= Leonardo Cilaurren =

Spanish footballer

Personal information
- Full name: Leonardo Cilaurren Uriarte
- Date of birth: 5 November 1912
- Place of birth: Basurto-Zorrotza, Spain
- Date of death: 9 December 1969 (aged 57)
- Place of death: Madrid, Spain
- Height: 1.75 m (5 ft 9 in)
- Position: Midfielder

Senior career*
| Years | Team | Apps | (Gls) |
| 1929–1931 | Arenas Club de Getxo | 43 | (0) |
| 1931–1936 | Athletic Bilbao | 49 | (2) |
| 1938–1939 | Club Deportivo Euzkadi | 12 | (0) |
| 1939–1941 | River Plate | 19 | (3) |
| 1941–1943 | Peñarol | ? | (?) |
| 1943–1945 | Real Club España | ? | (?) |

International career
| 1931–1935 | Spain | 14 | (0) |
| 1937–1939 | Basque Country | ? | (3) |
- * Club domestic league appearances and goals

Leonardo Cilaurren Uriarte (Basque: [leonardo ṣilauren uriarte] 5 November 1912 – 9 December 1969) was a Spanish international footballer who played professionally as a midfielder in Spain, Argentina, Uruguay and Mexico between 1929 and 1945.

== Career ==
=== Club career ===
Born in Bilbao in the Basque Country, Cilaurren played club football in Spain for Arenas Club de Getxo and Athletic Bilbao prior to the Spanish Civil War. With Athletic, he won the Copa del Rey in 1933 and La Liga in 1933–34 before his career was interrupted by the conflict.

During the 1938–39 season, he played for Club Deportivo Euzkadi (the Basque exiles' team) in the Mexican league. In 1939 he joined River Plate in Argentina where he played 19 times, scoring 3 goals. He then played for CA Peñarol of Uruguay before returning to Mexico in 1943 where he played for Real Club España and was part of the team that won the League title in 1943–44, the Mexican Cup in 1944–45 and two editions of the Mexican Super Cup in 1944 and 1945.

=== International career ===
Cilaurren earned 14 caps for the Spanish national side between 1931 and 1935, and participated at the 1934 FIFA World Cup. From 1937 to 1939 he was part of the Basque Country national football team which toured Europa and the Americas.
