= Fernando Regueira =

Argentine film writer

Fernando Regueira (Quilmes, Buenos Aires, 1972) is an Argentine film writer. He wrote scripts for cinema, television and short films. He studied film theory and criticism at "Aquilea" school with Angel Faretta. He also studied philosophy, music and history. He wrote the first season of the series "Mosca & Smith in Once". He also wrote scripts for Juan Carlos Desanzo, Norberto Lopez Amado, Patagonik Film Group and DeAPlaneta Spain. He has won several awards for his scripts.

== Film selected ==
- Mosca & Smith en el Once, (1999)
- La casa, Juan Carlos Desanzo (2001)
- Un suelo de cenizas, Norberto López Amado (2002)

== Awards ==
- INCAA (Proyecto Raíces),
- Fondo de Fomento de la Provincia de San Luis
- Mafici.
