= Gregorio Blasco =

Spanish footballer (1909–1983)

Personal information
- Full name: Gregorio Blasco Sánchez
- Date of birth: 10 June 1909
- Place of birth: Mundaka, Spain
- Date of death: 31 January 1983 (aged 73)
- Place of death: Mexico City, Mexico
- Height: 1.74 m (5 ft 8 1/2 in)
- Position: Goalkeeper

Senior career*
Years	Team	Apps	(Gls)
1926–1928	Acero de Olabeaga		
1928–1936	Athletic Bilbao	113	(0)
1938–1939	Club Deportivo Euzkadi	12	(0)
1939–1946	Real Club España		
1940–1941	→ River Plate (loan)		
1946–1947	Atlante		

International career
1930–1936	Spain	5	(0)
1937–1939	Basque Country	41	(0)
- * Club domestic league appearances and goals

Gregorio Blasco Sánchez (10 June 1909 – 31 January 1983), also known as Goyo Blasco, was a Spanish footballer who played as a goalkeeper.

== Personal life ==
Born in Mundaka in the Basque Country, Blasco emigrated to Mexico where he married Maria Victoria González in 1943 and with whom he had 3 children, Gregorio, José Maria and Victoria.

== Career ==
Blasco began his career in 1926 when he joined Acero de Olabeaga. Two years later he signed for Athletic Bilbao where his first match was a friendly against Swansea City. During his time with Athletic Bilbao he won the Ricardo Zamora Trophy three times, and also played 5 times for the Spain national team. He played with Athletic Bilbao until the outbreak of the Spanish Civil War in 1936 when all national competitions in Spain were put on hold. In 1937, in the midst of the civil war, he was selected for the Basque Country national football team which was sent abroad to raise funds for refugees fleeing the conflict. In 1938 that team integrated into the Mexican league under the name Club Deportivo Euzkadi. After one season the team dissolved and Blasco joined Real Club España. In 1941 he joined River Plate in Argentina, before returning to Mexico a year later to rejoin Club España. He stayed there until 1947 when he joined rival team Atlante. He was one of the first goalkeepers to use goalkeeping gloves. Apart from being a footballer he also had a business selling construction materials.
