= Tolosa CF =

Association football club in Spain

Coordinates: 43.13245°N 2.07854°W

Tolosa
- Full name: Tolosa Club de Fútbol
- Founded: 1922
- Ground: Berazubi, Tolosa, Basque Country, Spain
- Capacity: 3,000
- President: (Spain) Iñaki Arratibel
- Head coach: (Spain) Gorka Etxebarría
- League: División de Honor
- 2025–26: División de Honor, 4th of 18
Home colours	Away colours

Tolosa Club de Fútbol is a Spanish football team based in Tolosa, in the autonomous community of Basque Country. Founded in 1922, it plays in the División de Honor, holding home games at Estadio Beratzubi, with a capacity of 3,000 seats.

== Season to season ==
Season	Tier	Division	Place	Copa del Rey
1929	3	3ª	8th	
1929–30	4	1ª Reg.	5th	
1930–31	3	3ª	6th	
1932–33	3	3ª	4th	
1933–34	4	1ª Reg.	6th	
1934–35	4	1ª Reg.	4th	
1935–36	4	1ª Reg.	2nd	
1939–40	4	1ª Reg.	6th	
1940–41	4	1ª Reg.	6th	
1941–42	3	1ª Reg.	6th	
1942–43	3	1ª Reg.	3rd	
1943–44	3	3ª	7th	First round
1944–45	3	3ª	8th	
1945–46	3	3ª	9th	
1946–47	3	3ª	9th	
1947–48	3	3ª	14th	Second round
1948–49	4	1ª Reg.	2nd	
1949–50	4	1ª Reg.	2nd	
1950–51	4	1ª Reg.	3rd	
1951–52	4	1ª Reg.	9th	

Season	Tier	Division	Place	Copa del Rey
1952–53	4	1ª Reg.	4th	
1953–54	4	1ª Reg.	5th	
1954–55	4	1ª Reg.	4th	
1955–56	4	1ª Reg.	5th	
1956–57	4	1ª Reg.	1st	
1957–58	3	3ª	4th	
1958–59	3	3ª	6th	
1959–60	3	3ª	9th	
1960–61	3	3ª	13th	
1961–62	3	3ª	11th	
1962–63	3	3ª	12th	
1963–64	3	3ª	15th	
1964–65	4	1ª Reg.	6th	
1965–66	4	1ª Reg.	4th	
1966–67	3	3ª	14th	
1967–68	4	1ª Reg.	2nd	
1968–69	4	1ª Reg.	1st	
1969–70	3	3ª	11th	Withdrew
1970–71	4	1ª Reg.	4th	
1971–72	4	1ª Reg.	8th	

Season	Tier	Division	Place	Copa del Rey
1972–73	4	1ª Reg.	1st	
1973–74	3	3ª	19th	
1974–75	4	Reg. Pref.	3rd	
1975–76	4	Reg. Pref.	10th	
1976–77	4	Reg. Pref.	3rd	
1977–78	4	3ª	10th	
1978–79	4	3ª	11th	First round
1979–80	4	3ª	17th	Second round
1980–81	4	3ª	17th	
1981–82	4	3ª	16th	
1982–83	4	3ª	14th	
1983–84	4	3ª	16th	
1984–85	4	3ª	12th	
1985–86	4	3ª	11th	
1986–87	4	3ª	16th	
1987–88	4	3ª	4th	
1988–89	4	3ª	5th	
1989–90	4	3ª	3rd	
1990–91	4	3ª	3rd	First round
1991–92	4	3ª	6th	First round

Season	Tier	Division	Place	Copa del Rey
1992–93	4	3ª	16th	First round
1993–94	4	3ª	11th	
1994–95	4	3ª	18th	
1995–96	5	Reg. Pref.	1st	
1996–97	4	3ª	7th	
1997–98	4	3ª	16th	
1998–99	4	3ª	15th	
1999–2000	4	3ª	20th	
2000–01	5	Reg. Pref.	4th	
2001–02	5	Reg. Pref.	2nd	
2002–03	5	Reg. Pref.	2nd	
2003–04	5	Reg. Pref.	5th	
2004–05	5	Reg. Pref.	1st	
2005–06	4	3ª	13th	
2006–07	4	3ª	16th	
2007–08	4	3ª	19th	
2008–09	5	Reg. Pref.	2nd	
2009–10	5	Div. Hon.	4th	
2010–11	5	Div. Hon.	7th	
2011–12	5	Div. Hon.	3rd	

Season	Tier	Division	Place	Copa del Rey
2012–13	5	Div. Hon.	7th	
2013–14	5	Div. Hon.	2nd	
2014–15	5	Div. Hon.	4th	
2015–16	5	Div. Hon.	1st	
2016–17	4	3ª	17th	
2017–18	5	Div. Hon.	3rd	
2018–19	5	Div. Hon.	2nd	
2019–20	4	3ª	17th	First round
2020–21	4	3ª	7th / 3rd	
2021–22	5	3ª RFEF	20th	
2022–23	6	Div. Hon.	14th	
2023–24	6	Div. Hon.	5th	
2024–25	6	Div. Hon.	11th	
2025–26	6	Div. Hon.		

- 46 seasons in Tercera División
- 1 season in Tercera División RFEF

== Famous players ==
- (Spain) Igor Jauregi
- (Spain) José Manuel Urquiola

== Famous coaches ==
- (Spain) Periko Alonso
