= Rafael Mendiluce =

Spanish footballer and coach

Personal information
- Full name: Rafael Mendiluce Elizondo
- Date of birth: 31 July 1939
- Place of birth: Andoain, Spain
- Date of death: 29 May 2014 (aged 74)
- Place of death: San Sebastián, Spain
- Height: 1.69 m (5 ft 7 in)
- Position: Forward

Youth career
- Real Sociedad

Senior career*
Years	Team	Apps	(Gls)
1957–1962	Real Sociedad B	78	(16)
1962–1973	Real Sociedad	309	(32)

Managerial career
- Real Sociedad (youth)
- 1977–?: Real Unión
- 1982–1985: Real Sociedad B
- * Club domestic league appearances and goals

Rafael Mendiluce Elizondo (31 July 1939 – 29 May 2014) was a Spanish football striker and coach. He played for Real Sociedad B between 1957 and 1962, scoring 16 goals in 78 matches. In 1962 he made his debut for the first team. He played for Real Sociedad from 1962 to 1973, when he retired. He scored a total of 32 goals in 302 matches.

Later he would coach Real Sociedad's youth team and Real Sociedad B between 1982 and 1985.
