= Selección Jalisco =

Seleccion Jalisco
- Full name: Selección de Jalisco
- Founded: 1926; 100 years ago
- Dissolved: 1943; 83 years ago
- Ground: Parque Oblatos; Guadalajara, Jalisco; Parque Estrella; Guadalajara, Jalisco
Home colours	Away colours

Selección Jalisco was a Mexican football team that played in the Liga Mexicana de Football Amateur Association prior to the professionalization and development of the Primera División de México. Prior to the invitation to the Primera Fuerza, the team played exhibition games formed with players with various Jalisco teams from the Liga Occidental De Jalisco.

== History ==
The first squad, formed by players from Guadalajara, Atlas, Nacional, and Oro, was organized in 1926

The team traveled around Mexico playing exhibition games against local teams. The most famous matches were against team from Mexico City where they played in 1926, 1928, and 1930. The matches were against teams from Primera Fuerza of Mexico City. These teams were Marte, Club España, Asturias, and América.

Although the matches were even, the Jaliscience teams were greatly affected by the capital teams. The capital teams saw the potential of the players and began to give offers to bring them to play for them. Marte would end up staying with half of the Selección Jalisco after General Aguirre offered large sums in order to get the players on loans.

"La Venada" Alatorre, Ignacio "El Calavera" Ávila, Tomás "El Poeta" Lozano, Lorenzo "La Yegua" Camarena, "El Patarato" Hernández y "El Moco" Hilario López, were some of the players that played in the first team in 1926.

After some time, the team influenced the Liga de Jalisco by giving it a huge boost by helping expand football over the whole state of Jalisco.

José Pelón Gutiérrez, Fausto Prieto, Max Prieto, Reyes "Terile" Sánchez, Luis Reyes, Teofilo Tilo García, Victoriano Zarco Vázquez, Pablo "Pablotas" González, Manuel "Cosas" López and Wintilio Lozano, were some of the players that formed the second squad in 1928.

In 1937, the squad became the first team from Mexico to travel on a tour. This tour took place in Colombia where they played against teams from Argentina, Panama, Colombia, Ecuador, Cuba, Venezuela, and Peru.

== Primera Fuerza ==
=== 1940–41 ===
The rise of football in Jalisco motivated Liga Mayor to invite Selección Jalisco to participate in the Primera Fuerza. The first game took place on August 11, 1940 at Campo Oro de Oblatos against Moctezuma. The final score was 5–1 in favor of Selección Jalisco. Their starting line-up was:

Goalkeeper: Fausto Quirarte y Angel Torres "Ranchero".
Defense: Antonio Casillas, José Gutiérrez "Pelón", José Luis Navarro.
Midfielders: "Térile" Reyes Sánchez, "Nano" Hernández, Rodrigo Ruiz, "Pis" Salcido, Gustavo González.
Forwards: "Tilo" Teófilo García, Fausto Prieto, "Pirracas" José Castellanos, "Pablotas" Pablo González, Max Prieto, "Cazuelas" Luis Grajeda, Luis Reyes, José Guadalupe Velázquez.

The team was very successful in attendance as well. In the season after the first seven games the team was in first place in the standings one point ahead of Atlante. They had only lose three points, a 0–0 draw against Asturias in Guadalajara and 2–5 defeat against Atlante in parque Asturias. They had 23 goals in favor in this time frame. However, during the last seven games it was a different story. The condition of the team plummeted and was only able to gain four points out of twelfth placing them in 5th place at the end of the season.

Selección Jalisco ended participating in the 1940–41, 1941–42, and 1942–43 seasons where their performance left them in mid table. During those seasons the team was composed of notable players such as Villavicencio, "El Pelón" Gutiérrez, "Pirracas" Castellanos, Rodrigo Ruiz, "Tilo" García, Max Prieto, Luis Reyes, "El Cosas" López, "El Ranchero" Torres, Lupe Velázquez, Pablo "Pablotas" González, "El Zarco" Vázquez, and Bonfiglio who was the goalkeeper and head coach.

=== 1943–44 ===
In 1943, the Liga Mayor de Jalisco, Liga Veracruzana, and Liga Mayor del Distrito Federal joined in order to form the first professional division of Mexican football, the Primera División de México. Due to this the team gave way to Guadalajara, Atlas, and Oro to participate in the newly formed league.

== Future appearances ==
Since Jalisco had teams in the professional league it moved aside from having a squad. However, the squad was reunited once in a while in order to play exhibition games. In 1981, Selección Jalisco defeated Barcelona 1–0 on May 13.

Selección Jalisco: Ledesma, Chávez, Zapiain, Cisneros, Barba, Aurélio, Real, Guillen, Magaña, Rangel, Bernardino, Subs: Cárdenas, Hugo-Díaz, Márquez.
Barcelona: Artola, Ramos, Migueli, Olmo, Manolo, Sánchez, Landáburu, (Albaladejo), Paco-Martínez, Estella, Simonsen, (Carrasco), Ramírez.
Referee: Joaquin Urrea.

== Coaches ==
These were some of the coaches Selección Jalisco had during the period in Primera Fuerza from 1940 to 1943:

Filberto Aceves
Ignacio "Calavera" Ávila
Loranzo "Yegua" Camarena
Antonio "Indio" Carrazco

== Honours ==
- VIII Campeonato Nacional: 1941

Against Selección del Distrito Federal 3–2, May 18, 1941 in Mexico City

- Trofeo Manuel Ávila Camacho: 1941

Against Necaxa 2–0, December 3, 1941

== See also ==
- Football in Mexico
