= Joaquín Urquiaga =

Spanish footballer and manager

Personal information
- Full name: Joaquín Urquiaga Legarburu
- Date of birth: 29 March 1910
- Place of birth: Zorroza, Spain
- Date of death: 28 July 1965 (aged 55)
- Place of death: Bilbao, Spain
- Position: Goalkeeper

Senior career*
Years	Team	Apps	(Gls)
1932–1937	Real Betis	76	(0)
1937–1944	Asturias		
1944–1946	Veracruz		

Managerial career
- 1947–1948: Veracruz
- 1952–1953: Tampico
- * Club domestic league appearances and goals

Joaquín Urquiaga (29 March 1910 – 28 July 1965) was a football player and manager who played professionally in Mexico and Spain.

== Career ==
Born in Zorroza, Biscay, Urquiaga played as a goalkeeper for Real Betis. He made his La Liga debut on 25 December 1932, and would help Betis win the league in the 1934–35 season. In four seasons, Urquiaga made 72 league appearances for Betis.

Fleeing the Spanish Civil War in 1937, Urquiaga traveled to Mexico where he joined Asturias. He also played for Veracruz, where he won the Primera División de México title in 1945–46.

After he retired from playing, Urquiaga became a football coach. He led Veracruz to the 1947–48 Copa México title. Urquiaga also managed Tampico, leading the club to a league and cup double in 1952–53.

== Personal ==
Urquiaga died in Bilbao in July 1965.
