= 1938–39 Liga Mayor season =

Liga Mayor
- Season: 1938–39
- Champions: Asturias FC (2nd title)
- Matches: 42
- Goals: 226 (5.38 per match)
- Top goalscorer: Miguel Gual (20 goals)

The 1938–39 season was the 17th edition of the amateur league called Liga Mayor.

== Standings ==
Pos	Team	Pld	W	D	L	GF	GA	GD	Pts
1	Asturias FC	12	7	3	2	32	24	+8	17
2	CD Euzkadi	12	7	1	4	44	33	+11	15
3	Club América	12	5	3	4	31	26	+5	13
4	Club Necaxa	12	5	2	5	32	31	+1	12
5	RC España	12	5	1	6	41	37	+4	11
6	CD Marte	12	4	1	7	24	33	−9	9
7	Atlante FC	12	3	1	8	22	42	−20	7

Source: RSSSF

=== Top goalscorers ===
Player	Club	Goals
(Spain) Miguel Gual	RC España	20
