= Belize women's national cricket team =

Cricket team

Belize
- Flag of Belize
- Association: Belize National Cricket Association

International Cricket Council
- ICC status: Associate member (2017); Affiliate member (1997)
- ICC region: Americas
ICC Rankings	Current	Best-ever
T20I	34th	29th (19 Feb 2020)

T20 Internationals
- First T20I: v Costa Rica at Los Reyes Polo Club, Guácima; 13 December 2019
- Last T20I: v Costa Rica at Los Reyes Polo Club, Guácima; 15 December 2019
T20Is	Played	Won/Lost
Total	6	5/1 (0 ties, 0 no results)
This year	0	0/0 (0 ties, 0 no results)
- As of 1 January 2024

The Belize national women's cricket team is the team that represents Belize in international women's cricket. In April 2018, the International Cricket Council (ICC) granted full Women's Twenty20 International (WT20I) status to all its members. Therefore, all Twenty20 matches played between Belize women and other ICC members after 1 July 2018 will be a full WT20I.

The team played its first WT20I matches during a tour of Costa Rica in December 2019.

== Records and statistics ==
International Match Summary — Belize Women

Last updated 15 December 2019

Playing Record
Format	M	W	L	T	NR	Inaugural match
Twenty20 Internationals	6	5	1	0	0	13 December 2019

=== Twenty20 International ===
T20I record versus other nations

Records complete to WT20I #816. Last updated 15 December 2019.

Opponent	M	W	L	T	NR	First match	First win
ICC Associate members
v Costa Rica	6	5	1	0	0	13 December 2019	13 December 2019

== See also ==
- List of Belize women Twenty20 International cricketers
- Belize national cricket team
