= Albinegros de Orizaba =

- Full name: Club Deportivo Albinegros de Orizaba
- Nicknames: Los Albinegros (The White-and-Blacks); Bicolor; Chayoteros
- Founded: 1898; 128 years ago (as Orizaba Athletic Club)
- Dissolved: 18 December 2019; 6 years ago
- Ground: Estadio Socum; Orizaba, Veracruz
- Capacity: 7,000
Home colours	Away colours

Club Deportivo Albinegros de Orizaba was a Mexican football club based in Orizaba, Veracruz, that played in the Segunda División de México. Founded in 1898 as Orizaba Athletic Club, it was one of the first clubs founded in the country and a founding member of the Liga Mexicana de Football Amateur Association. Throughout its history, the club was renamed as U-29 and Asociación Deportiva Orizabeña in 1916, Orizaba Fútbol Club in 1959, and finally changed to its last used name in 2002.

It was founded by the Scottish migrant Duncan Mac Comish Mac Donald who owned a local steel company. In the beginning, the club hosted cricket among other sports. The club had the honor of being Mexico's first amateur football champions in 1903 when it played in the Liga Mexicana de Football Amateur Association. The club was among the first to play, in 1943, in the Primera División de México which was the first ever professional league in the nation's history. The club played in the Liga de Ascenso de México from 2009 after spending a few years playing in the Segunda División de México. After playing in their home stadium Estadio Socum for the first six months after their return to the Liga de Ascenso in the first half of 2009, the team had to play most of their home matches in the seasons 2009-10 and 2010–11 in the Estadio Luis de la Fuente in the city of Veracruz, sharing it with Tiburones Rojos de Veracruz because the Estadio Socum was no longer accepted to be the host of second-division games. From the 2011–12 season they played in the Segunda División de México, between 2011 and 2018 in their own stadium, From February 2018, they moved again to the Luis "Pirata" Fuente because the team management had commercial disagreements with the company that owned the Estadio Socum.

On December 18, 2019, Orizaba was dissolved due to the disaffiliation of Tiburones Rojos de Veracruz. Orizaba was the Veracruz reserve team and was registered with the same legal name as Veracruz.

== History ==
=== 1890s–1920 ===
In the 1880s, numerous immigrants from all over Europe were coming into the port of Veracruz and spreading around the state's cities. Many companies were founded in those years, mostly steel and fabric companies. Immigrants brought along a new sport from Europe which they started teaching the locals and would go on to sponsor clubs made up by its workers to represent the company in friendly matches that started off in the early 1890s. Some important factories were Santa Gertrudis Fábrica de Yute, which was founded and owned by Scottish Duncan Mac Comish Mac Donald and Thomas Hanghey, who had a long football background and so they decided along with other local factory owners to establish a local football league in 1886, having the first game played in the old "Campo El Yute".

The "Orizaba Athletic Club" was founded in 1898 as a sports club where cricket (among other sports) could be practiced. The club was founded by Comish Mac Donald, who owned a local steel company. A few years later, Comish Mac Donald and Thomas Hanghey, along with English Percy C. Clifford (a pioneer in the sport in Mexico City) decided to form a semi-professional league that would include clubs from the capital and from the provinces.

=== First Championship ===
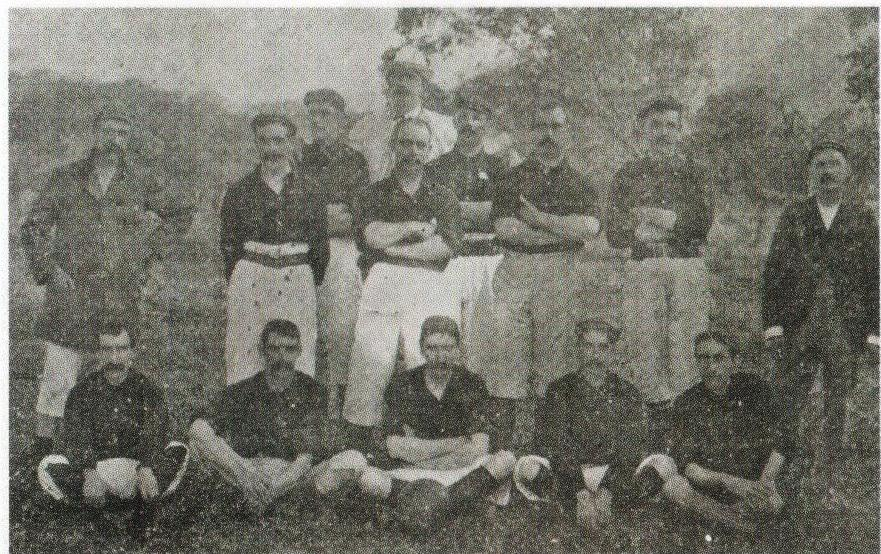
The 1902 team, the first Mexican football champion ever.

In 1902, the "Liga Mexicana de Football Amateur Association", also known as Primera Fuerza, was founded with 5 clubs Pachuca, Mexico Cricket Club, Reforma and British Club. The league finished its first year successful with Orizaba crowning the first champion in Mexico's history. Right after the tournament ended there were internal problems with the club, and as a result, Orizaba decided to leave the league.

==== 1902 League standings ====
Club	Pos	GP	W	T	L	GS	GA	PTS
Orizaba AC	5	8	0	0	8	0	9	7
Reforma	2	4	2	2	0	11	5	6
British Club	3	4	2	0	2	7	3	4
Pachuca	4	4	0	2	2	2	6	2
Mexico Cricket	5	4	0	1	3	3	16	3

1902 Championship year

After this year the club folded and would not return till 1916

Logo of A.D.O.

=== Club's second stay ===
The club returned to action in 1916, this time in a local league Liga Amateur de Veracruz, and changed its name to "U-29", which represented a German submarine that fought in the World War I. The club decided to change its name again because local native fell to identified themselves with the club. So on June 17, 1916, the club switched to "Asociación Deportiva Orizabeña" or simply known as "A.D.O.". A local Spanish immigrant, Isidro Palou, came up with the name which was chosen over other names "Orizaba Sporting Club" and "Club Deportivo de Fútbol". And so in that same year, the club took part in the local league with new board of directors Ernesto Arzamendi, Mario Ojeda, Rafael Portas, Eduardo Ruiz, José Powel, Rafael Romero, José Sosa, Jurado y Carlos Namur.

=== 1920–1930 ===
In 1921, the club was once again invited to take part of a special tournament played in Mexico City to commemorate the nation's 100-year Independence anniversary. The club along with local clubs Veracruz Sporting Club and Iberia de Córdoba head down to Mexico City to face the clubs from Mexico City. The 3 local clubs fail to advance to the knockout round the eventual champion was Real Club España over Asturias. After this tournament the Primera Fuerza league took a year off and when activity resume in 1922 the league decided to allow only clubs from Mexico City to participate and so clubs A.D.O., Veracruz Sporting Club and Iberia de Córdoba from Veracruz return to their league as did Pachuca who return to play in an amateur league in the state of Hidalgo.

=== 1929 Torneo Veracruzano ===
In 1929, the state of Veracruz decided to hold its own national Tournament inviting clubs Toluca, Pachuca, Irapuato and clubs from Jalisco and Guanajuato among local clubs Veracruz Sporting Club and Iberia de Córdoba. A.D.O. would reach the final and face off against a club from Mexico City made up of players from various clubs from the Primera Fuerza League. The club managed to win the first and only such tournament held in Veracruz. The club was composed of players like Mr. Neto, "Pepón" Martínez, Roberto Guzmán, Abel Papicha Solar, Otto Neumayer, Marín El Mefisto and brothers Mario and José Campos, with goalkeeper Ernesto Herrera.

=== 1940–50 ===
In 1943, along with newly founded club Tiburones Rojos de Veracruz which was formed from the merger of Veracruz Sporting Club and Iberia de Córdoba and with town rival Moctezuma de Orizaba, were invited to play in the newly form Professionalized league in Mexico. The club lost its first Match against América in October 1943 with a score of 6–1. The club went on to lose its second game against Jalisco powerhouse Guadalajara 5–1. The club managed to win its first league match against Atlas on November 4 of that same year with a score of 9–2. The club finished in 9th place, overall. The following year under the club finished in 7th place to last under the management of John Hogg, a legend in the institution who was part of the 1902–03 championship. In the 1946–47 tournament, the club finished second to last tied with San Sebastián, manager John Hogg left the club that year due to health problems.

In the 1947–48 tournament, another legend in the institution, Byron Kennell (who had also been part of that 1902–03 championship squad) took over as manager. That year the team finished in 5th place. The following year, still with Kennell as manager, the club remains among the 10 best placed. After the 1948–49 tournament, Albinegros suffered internal problems which caused the club to fold for the second time in its history having played 6 years in the Primera División de México.

=== Primera División stats ===
Year	Pos	GP	W	T	L	GS	GA	PTS
1943–44	9	18	5	2	11	37	54	12
1944–45	12	24	8	3	13	46	57	19
1945–46	7	30	14	4	12	49	52	32
1946–47	12	28	7	5	16	51	62	19
1947–48	5	28	13	5	10	68	66	31
1948–49	6	28	10	8	10	56	54	28

From 1943 to 1949 After the 1948–49 season, A.D.O. folded .

Logo of Orizaba F.C.

=== Orizaba F.C. ===
In 1959, the club made his returns to action under the name of "Orizaba F.C." enrolling in the Segunda División de México where the team played until the end of the 1960s. Subsecquently, the club would be relegated to the Tercera División de México and won the tournament in the 1971–72 season under the management of Miguel Ángel Lujan Mata. But the club was once again folding due to lack of fan support and economical problems.

=== Present day ===
The club made another comeback in 2002 after the owner of Club Bachilleres de Guadalajara moved the club to Orizaba, this time under the name of Albinegros de Orizaba. The club also had an affiliate club in the Segunda División. In 2002, the club became affiliated with the Primera División club Pumas U.N.A.M. After having a very bad year in the Primera División 'A' de México, the owner sold the club and relocated to Tabasco where it played under the name Lagartos de Tabasco, remaining the only affiliate Segunda División team which remains as the city's club. The club played in the Segunda División de México until 2008, when the owner bought local club Tiburones Rojos de Coatzacoalcos who at the time played in the Primera División 'A' de México.The club has been playing in the reformed Liga de Ascenso de México between 2009 and 2011.

=== Defunction ===
After the serious financial problems of its rival from the same state, Tiburones Rojos de Veracruz, the teams were unified with Albinegros disappearing and Veracruz continuing in the Liga de Ascenso. As a tribute, Veracruz away kit is black and white, the characteristic colors of Albinegros de Orizaba.

However, later, Veracruz converted the second team into Albinegros de Orizaba to recover his identity. Until 2017, Albinegros competed in the Liga Premier de Ascenso. In the same year, the team was relegated to the Serie B due to lack of adequate sports facilities, in the Clausura 2018, Orizaba won the championship. For the 2018–19 season, the team returned to the Serie A.

On December 18, 2019, Orizaba was dissolved due to the disaffiliation of Tiburones Rojos de Veracruz. Orizaba was the Veracruz reserve team and was registered with the same legal name as Veracruz.

Year	Pos	GP	W	T	L	GS	GA	PTS
Clausura 2009	14	16	5	5	6	15	16	20
Apertura 2010	15	16	2	7	7	11	21	13

Liga de ascenso stats

== Kit evolution ==
First kit evolution

1902 Home 1902 Away	1916 Home 1916 Away	1929 Home 1929 Away	1930–43 Home 1930–43 Away	1994 Home 1994 Away	2002 Home 2002 Away	2008 Home 2008 Away	2009 Home 2009 Away	2017 Home 2017 Away	2018 Home 2018 Away

== Players ==
=== Current squad ===
Note: Flags indicate national team as defined under FIFA eligibility rules; some limited exceptions apply. Players may hold more than one non-FIFA nationality.

No.	Pos.	Nation	Player

Because the team has disbanded, there are no players on the team.

== Honors ==
=== National ===
==== Promotion divisions ====
- Copa México de Segunda División
  - Runners-up (1): 1964–65
- Liga Premier Serie B
  - Champions (1): Clausura 2018
- Tercera División
  - Champions (1): 1971–72
- Campeón de Campeones de Tercera División
  - Runners-up (1): 1972

=== Amateur ===
- Liga Mexicana de Football Amateur Association: 1902–03

== See also ==
- Football in Mexico
- Reforma Athletic Club
- British Club
