= 1904–05 Liga Mexicana de Football Amateur Association season =

Liga Mexicana de Football Amateur Association
- Season: 1904–05
- Champions: Pachuca AC (1st title)
- Matches: 20
- Goals: 45 (2.25 per match)

The 1904–05 season was the 3rd edition of the Liga Mexicana de Football Amateur Association. Orizaba left the league, Puebla AC joined the league and Mexico Cricket Club changed its name to San Pedro Golf Club.

== Standings ==
Pos	Team	Pld	W	D	L	GF	GA	GD	Pts
1	Pachuca AC	8	5	2	1	9	3	+6	12
2	British Club	8	6	0	2	14	9	+5	12
3	Reforma AC	8	4	2	2	14	9	+5	10
4	San Pedro GC	8	2	2	4	8	13	−5	6
5	Puebla AC	8	0	0	8	0	11	−11	0

Source: RSSSF
