= 1908–09 Liga Mexicana de Football Amateur Association season =

Liga Mexicana de Football Amateur Association
- Season: 1908–09
- Champions: Reforma AC (3rd title)
- Matches: 6
- Goals: 15 (2.5 per match)

The 1908–09 season was the 7th edition of the Liga Mexicana de Football Amateur Association. Only 3 teams participated after the dissolution of México FC.

== Standings ==
Pos	Team	Pld	W	D	L	GF	GA	GD	Pts
1	Reforma AC	4	2	2	0	6	1	+5	6
2	Pachuca AC	4	2	1	1	8	5	+3	5
3	British Club	4	0	1	3	1	9	−8	1

Source: RSSSF
