= Puebla AC =

- Full name: Puebla Athletic Club
- Nickname: Abejas (Bees)
- Founded: December 10, 1892; 133 years ago (as Puebla Football Club)
- Dissolved: 1915; 111 years ago
- Ground: Campo Velódromo; Puebla
- 1906–07: 3rd
Home colours	Away colours

Puebla Athletic Club was a Mexican sports club based in the city of Puebla. The club was mostly known for its football team, that played in the Liga Mexicana de Football Amateur Association from 1904 to 1907. Founded in 1892 as Puebla Football Club and then changed its name to Puebla Athletic Club in 1894.

== History ==
The club was founded on December 10, 1892 by William R. Turnbull who decided to create a football Association club that same year and challenge clubs from Mexico City .Since there were no Clubs establish at the time in the capital those who practice the sports join forces to represent the city against Puebla. This game took place in Puebla city on February 7, 1894 in the old Velódromo Park .The match ended 2-0 in favor for Puebla A.C ,'The Two Republics states that the goals were scored by TR Phillips who went on to found Reforma AC, and Claude Butlin (the first highly trained athlete to migrate to Mexico). This match fuelled the interest in this new sport which was short lived being that cricket had become more popular and had become more organized with clubs popping in and around Mexico.

In 1902 the Club was invited to play in the newly created Primera Fuerza but due to a lack of football players they declined the invitation saying they would take it up in the future. During the late 1890s and early 1900s the club would mainly practice tennis, cricket and baseball. In 1904 Puebla would finally join the Primera Fuerza taking this time to better establish its football club.

In their first tournament in 1904–05 Puebla lost all games and didn't score a goal in the 8 matches played, therefore finishing last. In the 1905–06 season, the club struggled and managed to score its first and only goal in that tournament, finishing last with no wins, 1 draw and 7 losses, and 20 goals against.

For the 1906–07 season Puebla finished third with 3 wins, 3 losses and 2 draws for a total of 9 points with 8 goals scored and 6 against. This tournament was the club's last in the league mostly due to the lack of interest from the people of Puebla with the native Mexican crowd not supporting an English only football club.

The City of Puebla would not see Football for 8 years until 1915, when the First Puebla FC (Became España de Puebla in 1916 after joying forces with Real Club España)by Spaniards living in Puebla. Due to the lack of opponents, having only one with neighboring town San Martín Texmelucan, the club would be forced to go Orizaba, Veracruz to find competition where they participated for a few years in the old "Liga Veracruzana de Fútbol". Another club was founded this time mostly by Mexican in 1917 under the name of "Reforma". Other clubs would soon be formed by French and German immigrants which only lasted a few years. It wasn't till 1944 –a year after the first professional football league was established in Mexico– that the city finally had a professional club Puebla FC which was founded on May 7, 1944.

== Amateur league ==
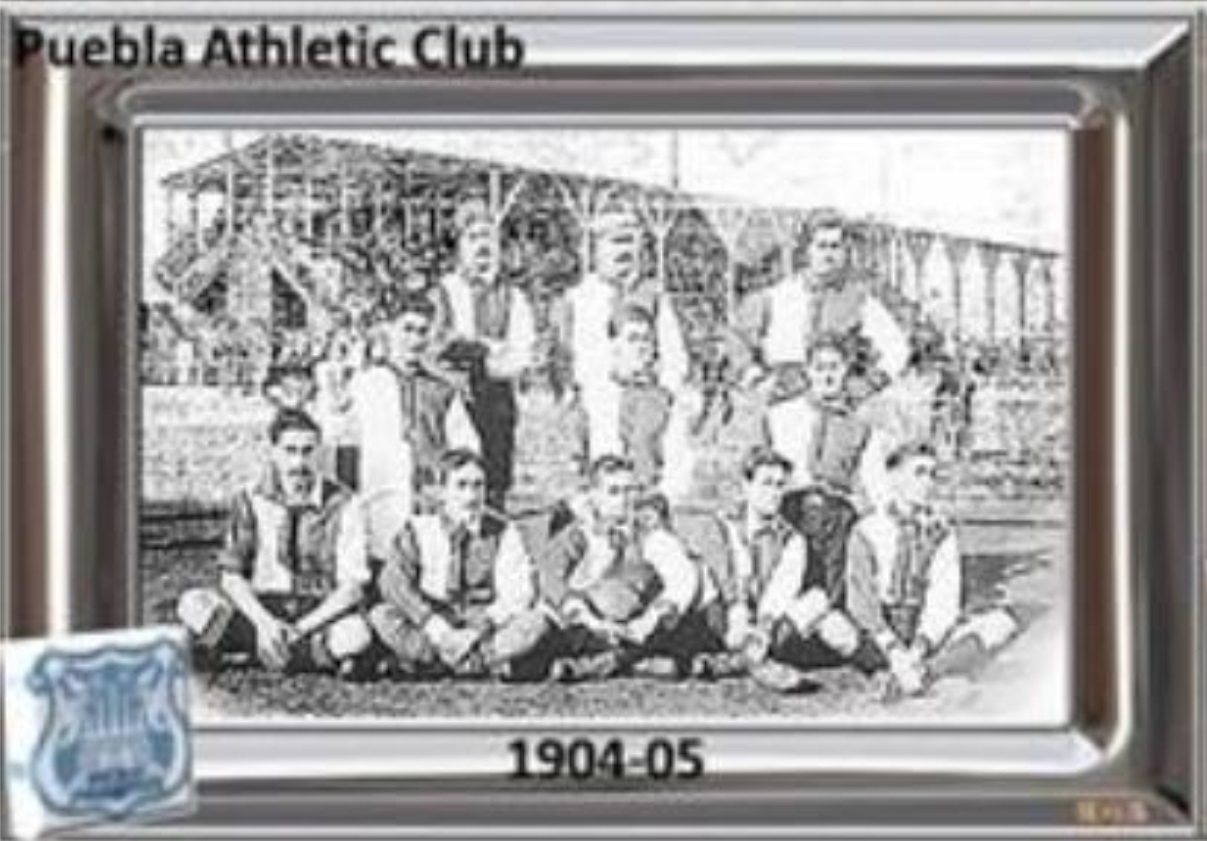
Club in 1904-1905 Primera Fuerza

Year	Pos	GP	W	T	L	GS	GA	PTS
1904–05	5	8	0	0	8	0	9	0
1905–06	3	8	0	1	7	1	20	1
1906–07	3	8	3	3	4	8	6	9

From 1904–07

After the 1906–07 season, Puebla A.C. folded

=== First kit evolution ===
1894
1904
1905
1907

== See also ==
- Football in Mexico
- Reforma Athletic Club
- Albinegros de Orizaba
- Puebla FC
