= 1907–08 Liga Mexicana de Football Amateur Association season =

Liga Mexicana de Football Amateur Association
- Season: 1907–08
- Champions: British Club (1st title)
- Matches: 12
- Goals: 17 (1.42 per match)

The 1907–08 season was the 6th edition of the Liga Mexicana de Football Amateur Association. Only 4 teams participated in the season, due to the dissolution of Puebla AC, Mexico Country Club was withdrawn from the league and México FC joined.

== Overview ==
The British Club won the championship, whose players were almost exclusively British and where player-trainer Percy Clifford, centre half-back "Jack" Caldwall and the Hogg brothers were the most prominent characters.

=== Champions squad ===
- (United Kingdom) John Easton
- (United Kingdom) Alexander Dewar
- (United Kingdom) Pierce Mennill
- (United Kingdom) Percy Clifford
- (United Kingdom) Bryan White
- (United Kingdom) John Johnson
- (United Kingdom) John Hogg
- (United Kingdom) Douglas Watson
- (United Kingdom) Stephen Crowder
- (United Kingdom) George Ratcliff
- (United Kingdom) John Caldwall
- (United Kingdom) Horace Hogg

== Standings ==
Pos	Team	Pld	W	D	L	GF	GA	GD	Pts
1	British Club	6	4	2	0	10	3	+7	10
2	México FC	6	2	2	2	6	7	−1	6
3	Pachuca AC	6	0	4	2	0	2	−2	4
4	Reforma AC	6	0	4	2	1	5	−4	4

Source: RSSSF
