= C.D. Veracruz =

Association football club in Mexico

Veracruz
- Full name: Club Deportivo Veracruz
- Nicknames: Tiburones Rojos (Red Sharks); Los Escualos (The Sharks); El Tiburón (The Shark)
- Short name: VER
- Founded: 9 April 1943; 83 years ago
- Dissolved: 18 December 2019; 6 years ago
- Ground: Estadio Luis "Pirata" Fuente; Veracruz
- Capacity: 28,703
Home colours	Away colours	Third colours

Club Deportivo Veracruz, simplified as CD Veracruz, and also known as Tiburones Rojos de Veracruz, was a Mexican professional football club based in Veracruz. Until 2019, it competed in Liga MX, the top division of Mexican football, and played its home matches at the Estadio Luis "Pirata" Fuente.

Domestically, CD Veracruz won two Liga MX titles and two Copa MX titles.

In December 2019, the FMF announced the disaffiliation of Veracruz from the Liga MX due to economic debts with first team players, its youth system, and the league.

== History ==
The club was founded around April 1943 under the name of Club Deportivo Veracruz after two clubs from the city state of Veracruz, Iberia de Córdoba and Veracruz Sporting Club, merged in order to join the Primera División de México. At the time, both clubs played in Liga Veracruzana, an amateur league in Veracruz. These two clubs had dominated the Liga Amateur de Veracruz, winning 21 titles combined. Each of these clubs had a short stay in the Primera Fuerza – a now defunct amateur football league in Mexico City – in the early 1920s but due to the distance, the clubs generally played in the local league which was less competitive. The club kept the Veracruz Sporting Club colors, red and black, which they used in the early part of its existence and a few years later would switch the black to white, keeping red as the club's main shirt color. In their first year the club played in Parque Deportivo Veracruzano sharing the field with baseball club Rojos del Águila de Veracruz. The club's nickname was given by Manuel Seyde who had also help merge the two clubs. The club had the honor of having been one of the first clubs to play in the professional league as well as having been the first club not from Mexico City to win the tournament. Among other records the club holds is most relegations (four times) including being relegated in 2008 by its hated rival Puebla who had just been promoted the year before. The club has played in the Liga de Ascenso de México ever since, coming close to promotion a couple of times but falling short each time.

The club played its first game in the 1943–44 Copa México tournament against Atlante who beat them 5–1. The club's first goal was scored by Manuel Rodríguez Angues, nicknamed as Manolín.

In their 1945–46 league Veracruz played 18 games with a streak of 14 wins and 4 draws. Veracruz also won their first title in that year. In the season 1947–48 they won their first Mexican Cup by beating Chivas 3–1. Soon Veracruz won their second title, in the 1949–50 season, with the most overwhelming victory in the history of Mexican football, beating Monterrey, 14–0.

Years later Veracruz acquired famous players such as René Higuita, Braulio Luna, Adolfo Ríos, Luis Hernández, Fernando Arce, Alfredo Tena and others. After being sold and moved to Tuxtla Gutiérrez, Chiapas and renamed Jaguares de Chiapas and later relegated to the Primera División 'A' de México, Veracruz came back in 2002 after being declared the Primera División 'A' champions and finished 11th place in the Summer of 2002. The Apertura 2004 season had been one of the best for Veracruz as they finished 1st place thanks to new signings such as Cuauhtémoc Blanco, Christian Giménez, Kléber Boas and others. Veracruz has had 59 managers so far, as of 2008. On the night of Friday April 25, 2008 at Luis "Pirata" Fuente stadium (home of the Tiburones Rojos de Veracruz), UNAM defeated Veracruz with a final score of 4–2, sending Veracruz to the Primera División 'A' league. Veracruz was officially relegated from the Primera División league on May 2, 2008 in the final match of the regular season against Tecos de la U.A.G. ending in a 0–0 draw.

=== First title ===
1945–46 championship club.

In the club's third year of existence in the 1945–46 tournament, the club went on to win 18 games with a record of 14 wins and 4 draws, managing to win 8 straight. The club scored 105 goals that year, leading the club in scoring was the Argentine Jorge Enrico followed by Raimundo González with 24. Luis de la Fuente was considered the club's best player because of his unique playing style.

It was on 2 June 1946, in the second to last round of the tournament in the Parque Asturias in Mexico City, home of Real Club España where the club won 2–3 and so were able to claim themselves champions for the first time. With goals scored by José Valdivia, Luis de la Fuente and Raimundo González, they ended a 26-year streak of the tournament being won by a club from Mexico City. That same year the club went on to lose the Campeón de Campeones title against Atlas.

=== First Copa México title ===
In the 1947–48 Copa México tournament, with the departure of the club's best players (the Argentine Jorge Enrico along with other good players such as Lazcano and Pachuco Durán, and maybe the club's most important trainer, Palomini) the club still won its first Copa México. The final was played against Guadalajara with a final score of 3–1 under the management of the Spaniard Joaquín Urquiaga. That is the only cup to date the club has won, finishing runner-up 3 times: in 1949–50, 1967–68 and 1994–95.

=== Second title ===
In the 1949–50 tournament the club won its last Primera División de México title till date. The club started off that year with a rejuvenated squad led by Juan Luque de Serrallonga who had just come from a stay with the Mexico national team the year before. This year is also remembered because the club had its first goal scoring champion: the Peruvian Julio Ayllon, also known as El Negro, black promotional football players in Mexico being uncommon at that time; Julio went on to score 30 goals that year.

=== The end of a Golden Era ===
The club welcomed the new decade with the start of the end of its golden age. The 1950–51 tournament became the first losing year due to economical problems the club faced under the ownership of Miguel Alemán Valdez and governor of the state Marco Antonio Muñoz.

The worst season came in the 1951–52 tournament after a long relegation fight that came down to the end against América; they lost and were relegated for the first time in history to the newly created Segunda División de México. That year the club finished with a record of 3 wins, 6 draws, and 13 losses allowing 54 goals and only scoring 22 for a total of 12 points, just 3 behind América (who kept the category and is one of two clubs that has never been relegated since the professionalization of the sport in Mexico).

In the 1952–53 tournament, playing in the Segunda División de México, the club finished the year just one point away from been promoted behind Toluca, who has played in the first division ever since. After that disappointing year almost all the players left the club following the 1953 cup tournament. As a result, the leagues decided to disband the club.

=== Return 1960s–1970s ===
In 1961, thanks to a group of supporters, they established a patronage in which José Lajud Kuri was named president and so revived the club in order to take part in the 1961–62 Segunda División de México tournament. The first couple of years were mediocre and they didn't have any success.

In 1964 the club was presented with an opportunity to be promoted after the league decided to increase the number of clubs from 14 to 16. That year, the worst first division club, Nacional de Guadalajara, played a promotional playoff tournament against the Segunda División club Petroleros de Ciudad Madero. Poza Rica and Veracruz had finished 2nd, 3rd and 4th (not counting Cruz Azul who had earned an automatic promotion after winning the tournament). That tournament ended with Nacional de Guadalajara and Veracruz earning first and second with Petroleros de Ciudad Madero third and Poza Rica fourth. The club had returned to the first division after 12 years of bitter, bitter waiting.

In the 1964–65 Primera División tournament, the club played their first game on June 7, 1964, against Morelia in the city of Morelia, Michoacán in a 3–3 draw. The club's first goal since coming back was scored by Jesús Mercado. That year the club had a record of 10 wins, 8 draws, and 12 defeats; they scored 41 and allowed 44 for a total of 28 points and fishing 10 overall in the league. Their best game was played in the 8th round when they defeated Zacatepec 5–1. In the 1978–79 tournament, the club was relegated for the second time after losing 22 games allowing 83 goals and finishing last in the competition. One thing to mention is that the club had five different trainers that year. One week before their last game in the Primera División the club secured their relegation after losing, 5–2, against Club Universidad de Guadalajara in the city of Guadalajara, Jalisco. The last game the club played in that tournament was against Tigres de la UANL one June 3, 1979, at home where they had a draw of 1–1 and so ended their second stay in the Primera División while ending another decade.

=== 1980s ===
The club started the 1980s in the Segunda División de México. After the 1983–84 tournament, the club was sold and moved to the city of Mérida, Yucatán where it became Venados de Yucatán. This club lasted a couple years before folding in 1998.

After several years of not having a football club representing the state of Veracruz, various attempts were made in order revive the club. One such was to buy the Ángeles de Puebla franchise which at the time was on sale due to the lack of supporters. The club had been in the same city as Puebla who had won two league titles and 2 Copa México titles in the 1980s. But in 1989, a group of local businessmen along with funding by the governor of the city of Veracruz bought the newly promoted club Potros Neza which at the time was affiliated with Primera División club Atlante. The club played their first tournament game that same year and lost to Puebla under the management of Héctor Sanabria. That year the club finished 5th in group 4 with a total of 34 - nonetheless the club won over supporters by playing with a lot of heart. Players such as Davidovich, José Luís Marroquín, Castañon, Salcedo, Pascual Ramírez, Eduardo Rergis, Eduardo Moses, Omar Palma, and Jorge Comas stood out. That year is remembered as La Tiburomania because no matter where the club played it always had a great deal of support no matter the distance. The club return started a euphoria in the city in the 1989–90 tournament when the club had 19 straight sell-outs. It all came to a climax when the club played top club América in the Estadio Azteca where 50,000 Veracruz supporters poured into a stadium with a capacity of 114,000 and they set a record for the most supports attending an away game. That game ended in a 3–5 win for the home team in a controversial match refereed by Javier Castellanos.

That same year there was a four-way special tournament inviting Brazilian club Botafogo, Spanish club Real Madrid and local club UNAM. Botafogo ended up taking home the cup but the fans remember this tournament because the club beat Real Madrid, 4–2, with a goal by the Argentine Omar Palma.

=== 1990s ===
The 1990s began with a group of players and a fan base which became known as La Tiburomaniam who cheer own fan favorite players Jorge Comas Adolfo Ríos, Joaquín Del Olmo, Octavio Becerril, Pascual Ramírez, José Luís González China under management of the Brazilian Edu. The club failed to qualify to the play-offs after a long battle for 2nd place in group 3 against Cruz Azul.

In the 1991–92 tournament, the club give its supporters something to cheer for after a bad start of the tournament which caused the existed of them club taker Angel Lopez who was replaced by Roberto Matosas. After the change of trainer the club had a much better tournament which qualified the club to a knockout play-off series against Correcaminos UAT which they won, 4–3, which they handed done since the club was reform in 1970. The club faced Necaxa in quarterfinals where they lost, 6–2.

In the 1993–94 tournament, the club celebrated its 50 anniversary with a special ceremony prior to the tournament where former club greats reunited to play a special match. That preseason the club signed former greats Carlos Poblete and Rubén Omar Romano. That year is also remembered for that great friendly match the club had against Atlético Madrid.

In the 1994–95 tournament, under the management of Anibal Ruiz who with a peculiar defensive style of coaching made the fans lose interest in the club nonetheless the club qualified to play a knock-out match against its hated rival Puebla who advanced to the quarterfinals after a 1–1 draw moving on due to a better position in the league. The club came close that year to winning the 1994–95 Copa México title after beating Irapuato, Estudiantes Tecos and Santos Laguna in that order facing Necaxa in the final match that took place in neutral ground in the Estadio Cuauhtémoc in the city of Puebla where the club fell 2–0. In 1995 the club was sold to local TV network Televisa who brought in better playgoers to the club reviving once again the hopes of the supporters.

In the 1996–97 the new owners signed José Mari Bakero who had just finished a long career with Spanish giant Barcelona along with key players from the Colombia national team Leonel Álvarez, Iván Valenciano, Alexis Mendoza mating important players and fan favorite goalkeeper Adolfo Ríos. With the hype of the club's new players many gave the club a chance of taking the league title but after a tournament field with injuries and with a divided locker-room the club gained only nine points and finished last leaving the club with relegation problems for the next campaign.

In the 1997–98 tournament the club let go most of the players bringing in the international known goalkeeper René Higuita along with players that were unknown in the league in order to avoid their third relegation. With lack of experience the players had the club ended that tournament with a record of 3 wins, 5 draws losing 9 games for a total of 14 points and so once selling their third relegation in club history.

In the Invierno 1998, playing now in the Primera División 'A' de México, the club started their journey to return once again to the top division hiring Juan Manuel Álvarez who had achieved this task before with Club Celaya a few years back. With the supports still hurt by the relegation at mid tournament Juan Manuel Álvarez was replaced by "El Turco" Aude coach who had much experience in the league and rallied the players reaching the semi-finals that year, losing the series to Venados de Yucatán.

In 1999, the club was sold to city of Veracruz along with local business owners. The club had one of the worst seasons in its history that the Invierno 1999 with a club mostly formed by veteran players along with young experienced players. In that tournament the club failed to qualify for the play-offs and the promotion seemed impossible each day – and that is how the club ended that decade with some strong clubs in the early part of the decade and with the club's third relation at the end of it.

=== 2000s ===
In the 2000–01 tournament the club finally lived up to its expectation becoming a competitive club in the Primera División 'A' de México the first have under the management of Carlos Trucco and Roberto Saporiti in other half, these two managers went on to win several games that would qualify them to the playoff where they were eliminated but had revived interest in the locals. At the end of that tournament the Primera División expanded from 18 to 20 which promoted two clubs that year. La Piedad was promoted after winning the Verano 2001 Primera A tournament and going on to win the Promotion match against Toros Neza. A promotion series was played between Atlante who had the worst relegation percentage against the club that had gain the most points in the Primera División 'A' that been Veracruz. A second promotion match was played between those two clubs the first match was played in jam packed Estadio Luis de la Fuente in Veracruz in match that ended in a 0–0 draw. The second match was played in the Estadio Azteca where Atlante defeated the Veracruz, 4–1, and remained in the top division. The club was later sold and moved to Tuxtla Gutiérrez, Chiapas and renamed Jaguares de Chiapas.

=== 2002 promotion ===
In 2002, they were promoted to the Primera División de México following their play-off victory against León.

=== 2008 relegation ===
In the Apertura 2007, the club finished second to last in the percentage table just above Puebla and below Tigres UANL with a percentage of 1.0706.

In the Primera División de México Clausura 2008, the club once again had a bad year with a record of 4 wins, 5 draws and losing 8 for a total of 17 points finishing 16 in the league. The club shed its relegation after losing at home against their direct rivals in the relegation fight Puebla with a score of 2–0. The club's relegation was made official in the following match against UNAM at home losing 4–2 and setting a new league record for a relegation with 4.

The club played in the Liga de Ascenso de México since the Apertura 2008, and came close several times but always coming short.

=== 2011 Disaffiliation ===
On June 3, 2011, the FMF disaffiliated the Tiburones Rojos franchise due to a failure of payments to the FMF.

“The Federacion Mexicana de Futbol Asociacion, AC informs that the Ordinary General Assembly at its meeting today, once it analyzed the situation of Representaciones Soha, Inc., SA de CV, (Club Veracruz and / or Club Tiburones Rojos de Veracruz), a member of the Liga de Ascenso de México, The Mexican Football Federation, AC unanimously decided, with its power under Articles 17, 25 and other related and applicable Statute of the FMF, revoke the Certificate of Membership and consequently disaffiliate such an entity, for failing to meet its financial obligations to FMF and its affiliates.”

After that announcement, it was accorded between Veracruz and Albinegros de Orizaba to unify their teams after the debts the team had.

=== 2013 Club Change ===
Club San Luis was relocated to Tuxtla Gutiérrez, Chiapas to play at the Estadio Víctor Manuel Reyna, under the name Chiapas Fútbol Club. Club La Piedad was relocated to the state of Veracruz to play at the Estadio Luis "Pirata" Fuente, under the name of Tiburones Rojos de Veracruz. Meanwhile, C.D. Veracruz was relocated to the state of San Luis Potosí, under the name of Atlético San Luis.

=== 2019 disaffiliation ===
After enduring a 41-game winless run dating from September 2018 to October 2019, multiple reports of players not receiving payment, an in-game protest against Tigres UANL in the Apertura 2019, where they conceded 3 goals in the first 8 minutes, and repeated discontent with owner Fidel Kurri, the FMF officially disaffiliated Veracruz from the Liga MX following the Apertura 2019. Their players became free agents, free to sign with any club, and their women's team was also kicked out of the Liga MX Femenil. All other branches of the club, including its academies and reserves, dissolved as well. As a result, the Liga MX began the Clausura 2020 with only 18 teams.

== 2020 reestablishment of reserves ==
In 2020, their former reserve team (2013–2016), Atlético Veracruz, was one of the teams reestablished to play in the Liga de Balompié Mexicano. On February 10, 2021, the club announced its retirement from the LBM to seek integration into the Mexican Football Federation (FMF), with the aim of being able to participate in the Liga de Expansión MX as of the 2021–22 season. Subsequently, the team decided to redirect their application and began the procedure to join the Liga Premier de México. On May 23, 2022, the Club Deportivo Veracruz Facebook page published a statement stating that they had finally paid all their debts. Also, they stated that the FMF had falsely accused them of having debt, and opened a lawsuit against the FMF for wrongful disaffiliation, looking to return to the Liga MX if the case is won.

== Rivalries ==
The club had a long-standing rivalry with Puebla. This rivalry dated back to the amateur era from the early 1930s, before both clubs had been admitted into the professional division in 1944.

In all Puebla and Veracruz played 68 official matches including league and Copa México. Puebla had the best record with 30 wins 15 draws.

== Past sponsors ==
Year	Manufacturer	Main Sponsor	Other Sponsors
1989–94	Pony		
1994–95	Adidas	Coca-Cola	
1995–97	Umbro	Coca-Cola	Cerveza Superior
1998–08	Atletica	Banco Azteca	Cerveza Sol, Grupo Gigante, Pegaso, Bimbo
2009–10	Joma	The Phone House	Cerveza Sol, Tele-Ver
2010–11	Nike	The Phone House	Cerveza Sol, Tele-Ver
2011–12	Nike	Chedraui	Cerveza Sol, Tele-Ver
2013–2014	Kappa	Winpot Casino	Boing, Tele-Ver, Tecate
2014–19	Charly	Winpot Casino	Boing, ADO, Tecate, Dodge

=== First kit evolution ===
1943	1950	1960	1978	1990	1995	2001	2008	2013

== Honours ==
=== Domestic ===
Type	Competition	Titles	Winning years	Runners-up
Top division	Liga Mayor	2	1945–46, 1949–50	–
Top division	Copa México/Copa MX	2	1947–48, Clausura 2016	1949–50, 1967–68, 1994–95
Top division	Campeón de Campeones	0	–	1946, 1948, 1950
Top division	Supercopa MX	0	–	2016
Promotion divisions	Primera División A/Liga de Ascenso	1	Invierno 2001	Apertura 2010
Promotion divisions	Campeón de Ascenso	0	–	2002
Promotion divisions	Segunda División	0	–	1952–53

== Record ==
=== Year-by-Year ===
Season	Pyramid Level	Regular season 1	Playoffs 1	Regular season 2	Playoffs 2	Copa México	CONCACAF
2001–02	2 and 1	4th	Champions	11th	did not qualify	No Longer played	did not qualify
2002–03	1	18th	did not qualify	7th	Semifinals	No Longer played	did not qualify
2003–04	1	12th	did not qualify	20th	did not qualify	No Longer played	did not qualify
2004–05	1	1st	Quarter-finals	17th	did not qualify	No Longer played	did not qualify
2005–06	1	18th	did not qualify	16th	did not qualify	No Longer played	did not qualify
2006–07	1	9th	Repechaje	18th	did not qualify	No Longer played	did not qualify
2007–08	1	13th	did not qualify	16th	did not qualify	No Longer played	did not qualify
2008–09	2	11th	did not qualify	3rd	Semi-finals	No Longer played	did not qualify
2009–10	2	4th	Semi-finals	15th	did not qualify	No Longer played	did not qualify
2010–11	2	5th	Second Place	5th	Disqualified	No Longer played	did not qualify
2011–12	2	8th	did not qualify	13th	did not qualify	No Longer played	did not qualify
2012–13	2	12th	did not qualify	4th	Quarter-finals	4th (DNQ); 3rd (DNQ)	did not qualify
2013–14	1	12th	did not qualify	18th	did not qualify	3rd (DNQ); 1st (semi-finals)	did not qualify
2014–15	1	17th	did not qualify	3rd	Quarter-finals	3rd (DNQ); 3rd (DNQ)	did not qualify
2015–16	1	8th	Quarter-finals	17th	did not qualify	1st (quarter-finals); 1st (champions)	did not qualify
2016–17	1	17th	did not qualify	13th	did not qualify	2nd (round of 16); 2nd (DNQ)	did not qualify
2017–18	1	17th	did not qualify	16th	did not qualify	2nd (DNQ); 3rd (DNQ)	did not qualify
2018–19	1	18th	did not qualify	18th	did not qualify	3rd (DNQ); 1st (quarter-finals)	did not qualify
2019–20	1	19th	did not qualify	Disaffiliated	did not qualify	2nd (DNQ)	did not qualify

== Club records ==
- Longest undefeated streak: 18 (1945–46)
- Most game without a draw: 19 (Invierno '99)
- Most games without a win: 40 (Clausura 2019)
- Longest winning streak: 8 (1945–46 y Apertura 2004)
- longest draw streak: 5 (1990–91)
- Longest losing streak: 9 (Verano 2002)
- Longest scoring streak: 28 (1946–47)
- Longest streak without a goal: 4 (1970–71)
- Longest streak with allowing a goal: 4 (1967–68 e Invierno 2000)
- Biggest win: 14–0 May 26, 1946 vs. Monterrey
- Biggest loss: 9–2 April 13, 2019 vs. C.F. Pachuca Veracruz vs. 0–7 Necaxa

=== All time top Goalscorers ===
These are the top 10 all time goal scorers in the club history.

Position	Player	Goals	Years
1	(Brazil) Mariano Ubiracy	98	1965–1972
2	(Mexico) Luis "Pirata" de la Fuente	83	1943–1952
3	(Mexico) Raymundo "Pelón" González	77	1986–1996
4	(Argentina) Jorge Comas	77	1989–1994
5	(Chile) José Luis "Loco" Aussín	65	1964–1971
6	(Argentina) Jorge Enrico	54	1943–1949
7	(Uruguay) Ricardo Brandón	45	1976–1978
8	(Uruguay) Gustavo "El Grillo" Biscayzacú	43	2004–2006
9	(Mexico) Jesús "Chucho" Hernández	39	????
10	(Mexico) Pedro Damián	36	????

=== Goal scoring champions ===
- Copa México 1943–44: José Miguel Díez (5)
- Liga 1949–50: Julio Ayllón (30)
- Liga 1989–90: Jorge Comas (26)

== Managers ==
- (Spain) Joaquín Urquiaga (1947–48)
- (Socialist Federal Republic of Yugoslavia) Velibor "Bora" Milutinović (July 1, 1988–88)
- (Brazil) Edu Antunes (1991)
- (Chile) Carlos Reinoso (1992–94)
- (Peru) Miguel Company (July 1, 1993–Dec 31, 1993)
- (Mexico) Tomás Boy (Sept 23, 1995–June 30, 1996)
- (Argentina) Luis Manuel Blanco (July 1, 1997 – June 30, 1998)
- (Uruguay) Héctor Hugo Eugui (1999)
- (Bolivia) Carlos Trucco (2000)
- (Argentina) Pablo Centrone (2001)
- (Uruguay) Hugo Fernández (2002)
- (Israel) Daniel Brailovsky (Sept 27, 2002–Dec 31, 2002)
- (Mexico) Daniel Guzmán (Jan 1, 2003–March 14, 2004)
- (Mexico) Tomás Boy (March 20, 2004 – June 30, 2004)
- (Uruguay) Wilson Graniolatti (July 1, 2004–Feb 28, 2005)
- (Mexico) Víctor Manuel Vucetich (March 4, 2005 – June 30, 2005)
- (Mexico) Alfredo Tena (Jan 1, 2006–Feb 14, 2006)
- (Mexico) Víctor Manuel Vucetich (March 3, 2006–Sept 3, 2006)
- (Argentina) Pedro Monzón (Sept 7, 2006–Feb 16, 2007)
- (Mexico) Carlos Barra (interim) (Feb 15, 2007–Feb 19, 2007)
- (Mexico) Emilio Gallegos Sánchez (Feb 22, 2007–March 11, 2007)
- (Mexico) Alejandro Domínguez (interim) (March 13, 2007 – March 17, 2007)
- (Uruguay) Aníbal Ruiz (March 15, 2007 – June 30, 2007)
- (Argentina) Nery Pumpido (July 1, 2007–Oct 6, 2007)
- (Argentina) Antonio Mohamed (Sept 4, 2007–Jan 26, 2008)
- (Mexico) Miguel Herrera (Jan 31, 2008–June 30, 2008)
- (Mexico) Pablo Luna (July 1, 2008–Aug 31, 2008)
- (Mexico) Sergio Orduña (Sept 8, 2008–March 22, 2009)
- (Mexico) Luis Flores (April 16, 2009 – June 30, 2009)
- (Mexico) Joaquín del Olmo (July 1, 2009–Feb 15, 2010)
- (Argentina) Jorge Almiron (Feb 17, 2010–March 29, 2010)
- (Mexico) Sergio Bueno (July 1, 2010–Sept 23, 2010)
- (Mexico) Carlos Turrubiates (Sept 24, 2010–Dec 31, 2010)
- (Mexico) Omar Arellano Nuño (Jan 1, 2011–June 30, 2011)
- (Mexico) Daniel Guzmán (July 1, 2011–Feb 12, 2012)
- (Mexico) Joaquín del Olmo (Feb 23, 2012–June 30, 2012)
- (Mexico) David Patiño (July 1, 2012–Sept 24, 2012)
- (Mexico) Ignacio Rodríguez (Sept 27, 2012–Dec 31, 2012)
- (Mexico) Miguel Fuentes (Dec 22, 2012–June 30, 2013)
- (Mexico) Juan Antonio Luna (July 1, 2013–Feb 9, 2014)
- (Mexico) José Luis Sánchez Solá (Feb 11, 2014–14)
- (Mexico) Cristóbal Ortega (May 26, 2014–1?)
- (Chile) Carlos Reinoso (2014–2017)
