= Costa Rica women's national cricket team =

Costa Rican women's cricket team

Costa Rica
- Flag of Costa Rica
- Association: Costa Rica Cricket Federation

International Cricket Council
- ICC status: Associate member (2017); Affiliate member (2002)
- ICC region: Americas
| ICC Rankings | Current | Best-ever |
| T20I | 47th | 47th (23-Dec-2022) |

T20 Internationals
- First T20I: v Mexico at Las Cabellerizas, Naucalpan; 26 April 2019
- Last T20I: v Chile at Pocos Oval, Poços de Caldas; 25 September 2026
| T20Is | Played | Won/Lost |
| Total | 16 | 6/9 (1 tie, 0 no results) |
| This year | 5 | 5/0 (0 ties, 0 no results) |
- As of 25 September 2026

The Costa Rica women's national cricket team represents the country of Costa Rica in women's cricket matches. In April 2018, the International Cricket Council (ICC) granted full Women's Twenty20 International (WT20I) status to all its members. Therefore, all Twenty20 matches played between the Costa Rica women's team and another international side after 1 July 2018 had full WT20I status.

In 2014, the Women's Cricket Association of Costa Rica was founded. The team's first WT20I matches were against the Mexico women's team, as part of the 2019 Central American Cricket Championship in Naucalpan, Mexico.

== Records and statistics ==
International Match Summary — Costa Rica Women

Last updated 25 September 2026

Playing Record
| Format | M | W | L | T | NR | Inaugural match |
| Twenty20 Internationals | 16 | 6 | 9 | 1 | 0 | 26 April 2019 |

=== Twenty20 International ===
- Highest team total: 113/2 v. Belize on 14 December 2019 at Los Reyes Polo Club, Guácima.
- Highest individual score: 46, Dunia Perez v. Mexico on 16 November 2024 at Reforma Athletic Club, Naucalpan.
- Best individual bowling figures: 4/15, Amanda Bolaños v. Belize on 14 December 2019 at Los Reyes Polo Club, Guácima.

T20I record versus other nations

Records complete to WT20I #3028. Last updated 25 September 2026.

| Opponent | M | W | L | T | NR | First match | First win |
|---|---|---|---|---|---|---|---|
ICC Associate members
| Belize | 6 | 1 | 5 | 0 | 0 | 13 December 2019 | 14 December 2019 |
| Chile | 5 | 5 | 0 | 0 | 0 | 24 April 2026 | 24 April 2026 |
| Mexico | 5 | 0 | 4 | 1 | 0 | 26 April 2019 | |

== See also ==
- List of Costa Rica women Twenty20 International cricketers
- Costa Rica national cricket team
