= 1905–06 Liga Mexicana de Football Amateur Association season =

Liga Mexicana de Football Amateur Association
- Season: 1905–06
- Champions: Reforma AC (1st title)
- Matches: 20
- Goals: 43 (2.15 per match)

The 1905–06 season was the 4th edition of the Liga Mexicana de Football Amateur Association. San Pedro Golf Club changed its name to Mexico Country Club.

== Overview ==
Reforma won the championship, though dominated by British players, did also allow native players. It was remarkable that in 20 league matches there were 16 where at last one or both sides failed to score. The champions had two excellent full-backs in the brothers Robert and Charles Blackmore, while most of their goals were not scored by a forward but by right half-back Charles Butlin.

=== Champions squad ===
- (England) Thomas R. Phillips(C)
- (England) Morton S. Turner
- (England) Robert J. Blackmore
- (England) Charles Blackmore
- (England) Charles M. Butlin
- (England) Ebenezer Johnson
- (England) Charles D. Gibson
- (England) Robert Locke
- (England) Thomas R. Phillips
- (England) Paul M. Bennett
- (England) Thomas R. Phillips (Manager)
- (Mexico) Julio Lacaud
- (Mexico) Vicente Etchegaray
- (France) Edward Bourchier

== Standings ==
Pos	Team	Pld	W	D	L	GF	GA	GD	Pts
1	Reforma AC	8	7	1	0	22	3	+19	15
2	Mexico Country Club	8	4	2	2	7	3	+4	10
3	Pachuca AC	8	3	4	1	6	4	+2	10
4	British Club	8	2	0	6	7	13	−6	4
5	Puebla AC	8	0	1	7	1	20	−19	1

Source: RSSSF
