= List of Belize Twenty20 International cricketers =

This is a list of Belizean Twenty20 International cricketers.

In April 2018, the ICC decided to grant full Twenty20 International (T20I) status to all its members. Therefore, all Twenty20 matches played between Belize and other ICC members after 1 January 2019 will be eligible for T20I status. Belize's first T20I was against Mexico on 25 April 2019 in the 2019 Central American Cricket Championship.

This list comprises all members of the Belize cricket team who have played at least one T20I match. It is initially arranged in the order in which each player won his first Twenty20 cap. Where more than one player won his first Twenty20 cap in the same match, those players are listed alphabetically by surname.

== Key ==
General

- ‡ – Captain
- † – Wicket-keeper
- First – Year of debut
- Last – Year of latest game
- Mat – Number of matches played

Batting

- Runs – Runs scored in career
- HS – Highest score
- Avg – Runs scored per dismissal
- * – Batsman remained not out
- 50 – Half-centuries scored

Bowling

- Balls – Balls bowled in career
- Wkt – Wickets taken in career
- BBI – Best bowling in an innings
- Ave – Average runs per wicket

Fielding

- Ca – Catches taken
- St – Stumpings affected

== List of players ==
Statistics are correct as of 27 June 2026.

Belize T20I cricketers
General					Batting				Bowling				Fielding		Ref
No.	Name	First	Last	Mat	Runs	HS	Avg	50	Balls	Wkt	BBI	Ave	Ca	St	Ref
1	Andrew Banner	2019	2026	11	72	28	9.00	0	90	2	1/18	51.00	4	0	
2	Glenford Banner	2019	2024	17	186	47	12.40	0	57	5	2/10	12.80	10	0	
3	Herbert Banner	2019	2019	3	9	6	9.00	0	72	4	2/18	16.75	0	0	
4	Keenan Flowers	2019	2019	3	20	17	10.00	0	12	1	1/16	16.00	0	0	
5	George Hyde	2019	2019	3	1	1	1.00	0	30	1	1/14	43.00	1	0	
6	Gareth Joseph	2019	2019	1	–	–	–	–	–	–	–	–	0	0	
7	Aaron Muslar†	2019	2021	9	54	15	7.71	0	78	8	3/10	9.62	1	3	
8	Glenroy Reynolds	2019	2019	3	10	6*	10.00	0	48	1	1/17	49.00	2	0	
9	Kenroy Reynolds	2019	2019	3	–	–	–	–	66	6	3/26	10.00	3	0	
10	Bernan Stephenson	2019	2024	17	268	69	20.61	1	186	11	3/16	18.45	2	0	
11	Kenton Young‡†	2019	2021	9	156	42	22.28	0	78	3	2/37	36.33	7	0	
12	Travis Stephenson	2019	2021	4	7	7*	–	0	42	2	2/12	25.50	0	0	
13	Garret Banner	2019	2024	15	118	32	14.75	0	282	11	2/14	29.09	9	0	
14	Cornel Brown	2021	2021	4	46	27	11.50	0	–	–	–	–	0	0	
15	Maurice Castillo‡	2021	2026	16	287	59	22.07	1	270	22	6/16	11.72	8	0	
16	Travis Samuels	2021	2021	5	32	17	8.00	0	30	0	–	–	0	0	
17	Keagan Tillett	2021	2021	5	12	9	4.00	0	32	4	3/24	18.50	0	0	
18	Muhammad Zaghlool	2021	2021	2	–	–	–	–	24	0	–	–	0	0	
19	T'shaka Patterson	2021	2026	6	35	16	7.00	0	20	0	–	–	1	0	
20	Nathan Banner	2021	2026	13	46	12*	9.20	0	240	11	3/12	24.72	4	0	
21	Winford Broaster	2021	2021	1	–	–	–	–	–	–	–	–	1	0	
22	Russhane Jones	2024	2024	3	7	7	7.00	0	36	1	1/22	41.00	0	0	
23	Brandon Lewis	2024	2024	6	3	2	3.00	0	102	7	2/10	13.14	0	0	
24	Alexander Oxley	2024	2026	11	256	80*	32.00	1	–	–	–	–	3	0	
25	Jaron Pakeman	2024	2024	5	10	7	3.33	0	–	–	–	–	3	0	
26	Jermaine Pook‡	2024	2024	3	1	1	0.50	0	–	–	–	–	0	0	
27	Clint Stephenson†	2024	2024	5	11	8	2.75	0	–	–	–	–	4	0	
28	Lawrence Bonner	2024	2026	10	142	70*	15.77	1	221	18	5/10	10.38	4	0	
29	Ordell Casasola	2024	2026	10	88	25	8.80	0	48	2	2/22	27.00	2	0	
30	Kristan Tillett	2024	2024	4	8	4	4.00	0	–	–	–	–	0	0	
31	Kenroy Bevans	2026	2026	1	–	–	–	–	–	–	–	–	0	0	
32	Roy Broaster	2026	2026	3	3	3	3.00	0	–	–	–	–	1	0	
33	Greg Scott	2026	2026	2	5	5	5.00	0	–	–	–	–	1	0	
34	Kenthon Moses	2026	2026	3	4	28	4.00	0	6	0	–	–	0	0	
35	Risdon Smith	2026	2026	1	–	–	–	–	–	–	–	–	0	0	
36	Tayshaun Moses	2026	2026	2	2	2*	–	0	42	2	2/23	24.00	1	0	
37	Leon Mcfadzean	2026	2026	1	6	6*	–	0	–	–	–	–	1	0	
