= 1906–07 Liga Mexicana de Football Amateur Association season =

Liga Mexicana de Football Amateur Association
- Season: 1906–07
- Champions: Reforma AC (2nd title)
- Matches: 20
- Goals: 42 (2.1 per match)

The 1906–07 season was the 5th edition of the Liga Mexicana de Football Amateur Association. Reforma AC became the first team to win two consecutives titles.

== Standings ==
Pos	Team	Pld	W	D	L	GF	GA	GD	Pts
1	Reforma AC	8	6	0	2	17	6	+11	12
2	British Club	8	5	1	2	8	10	−2	11
3	Puebla AC	8	3	2	3	9	6	+3	8
4	Mexico Country Club	8	3	2	3	8	11	−3	8
5	Pachuca AC	8	0	1	7	0	9	−9	1

Source: RSSSF
