= Wendell Coppin =

Barbadian cricketer

Personal information
- Full name: Wendell Ricardo Coppin
- Born: 18 August 1966 (age 60); Christ Church, Barbados
- Batting: Right-handed
- Bowling: Right-arm fast

Domestic team information
- Years: Team
- 1999: Norfolk

Career statistics
Competition	List A
Matches	1
Runs scored	2
Batting average	2.00
100s/50s	0/0
Top score	2
Balls bowled	60
Wickets	1
Bowling average	36.00
5 wickets in innings	0
10 wickets in match	0
Best bowling	1/36
Catches/stumpings	1/–
- Source: CricketArchive, 13 October 2011

Wendell Ricardo Coppin (born 8 August 1966) is a Barbadian former cricketer. He was a right-handed batsman and a right-arm fast bowler whose only high-level appearance came for Norfolk, an English minor county. Coppin's club team in Barbados was YMPC, where he served at various points as club president, captain, and coach.

Coppin represented Barbados Under-19s and later West Indies Young Cricketers between 1984 and 1985, before taking an eight-year gap from cricketing and, upon his return, playing for the Barbados first team. Despite playing a single game for Hampshire's Second XI, which was won by a ten-wicket margin thanks to a century from Paul Whitaker, Coppin was unable to break into the first team. His sole List A appearance came for Norfolk in the 1999 NatWest Trophy. From the middle of the order, Coppin scored two runs and took bowling figures of 1-36.

After retiring from playing, Coppin has worked as a development coach for ICC Americas. In March 2011, funded by that body, he served as the coach of the Belizean national side for the 2011 Americas Twenty20 Division Two tournament in Suriname the following month.
