= 1909–10 Liga Mexicana de Football Amateur Association season =

Liga Mexicana de Football Amateur Association
- Season: 1909–10
- Champions: Reforma AC (4th title)
- Matches: 12
- Goals: 46 (3.83 per match)

The 1909–10 season was the 8th edition of the Liga Mexicana de Football Amateur Association. It had 4 participating clubs, after Popo FC joined the league.

== Standings ==
Pos	Team	Pld	W	D	L	GF	GA	GD	Pts
1	Reforma AC	6	5	1	0	19	3	+16	11
2	Popo FC	6	3	1	2	11	15	−4	7
3	British Club	6	1	2	3	8	10	−2	4
4	Pachuca AC	6	0	2	4	8	18	−10	2

Source: RSSSF
