= 2010–11 Tiburones Rojos de Veracruz season =

Tiburones Rojos
2010-11 season
- Liga de Ascenso: 5th and 5th
- Apertura Liguilla: Runner up
- Clausura Liguilla: Disqualified

The 2010-2011 Tiburones Rojos de Veracruz season is the club's 67th year of existence.

== squad ==
Note: Flags indicate national team as defined under FIFA eligibility rules; some limited exceptions apply. Players may hold more than one non-FIFA nationality.

No.	Pos.	Nation	Player
1	GK	(Mexico) MEX	Jorge Bernal
2	DF	(Mexico) MEX	Diego Martínez
3	DF	(Mexico) MEX	Juan Manuel García
4	DF	(Mexico) MEX	Oscar Mascorro (Captain)
5	MF	(Mexico) MEX	Carlos Infante
6	MF	(Argentina) ARG	Oscar Ahumada
7	MF	(Mexico) MEX	Octavio Valdez
8	DF	(Mexico) MEX	Joel Sánchez
9	FW	(Mexico) MEX	Francisco Bravo
10	MF	(Colombia) COL	Andrés Chitiva
11	FW	(Uruguay) URU	Nelson Sebastián Maz
13	DF	(Uruguay) URU	Damián Macaluso
14	MF	(Mexico) MEX	Hugo García
15	DF	(Mexico) MEX	Manuel López Mondragón
17	MF	(Mexico) MEX	Hiber Ruíz
18	DF	(Mexico) MEX	Leonel Olmedo
19	FW	(Mexico) MEX	Mauricio Romero
20	MF	(Mexico) MEX	Guillermo Rojas

No.	Pos.	Nation	Player
21	DF	(Mexico) MEX	Enrique Escudero
22	FW	(Mexico) MEX	Luis Efrén Hernández
23	MF	(Mexico) MEX	José Alejandro Aguilar
25	FW	(Mexico) MEX	Fernando González
26	FW	(Mexico) MEX	Jesús Mendoza
27	MF	(Mexico) MEX	Jorge Hernández
28	MF	(Mexico) MEX	Juan Pablo García
29	DF	(Mexico) MEX	David Alejandro Rojina
30	GK	(Mexico) MEX	Tomás Adriano
31	GK	(Mexico) MEX	Liborio Sánchez
34	MF	(Mexico) MEX	Isaác Rivera
35	GK	(Mexico) MEX	Daniel Andrés Ruíz
36	GK	(Mexico) MEX	Julio César Alarcón
37	FW	(Mexico) MEX	Samer Haj Omar
53	FW	(Mexico) MEX	Alejandro Leyva
58	MF	(Mexico) MEX	Marco Antonio Reyna
94	FW	(Mexico) MEX	Ever Guzmán
210	FW	(Mexico) MEX	Rafael Valdés Rincón

== Match results ==
Win Tie Loss

=== Apertura 2010 ===
v

=== Clausura 2011 ===
v
