= Nadeem Khan =

Pakistani cricket administrator, coach and player

Personal information
- Full name: Mohammad Nadeem Khan
- Born: 10 December 1969 (age 56); Rawalpindi, Pakistan
- Batting: Right-handed
- Bowling: Slow left-arm orthodox
- Relatives: Moin Khan (brother); Azam Khan (nephew)

International information
- National side: Pakistan
- Test debut (cap 128): 1 May 1993 v West Indies
- Last Test: 28 January 1999 v India
- ODI debut (cap 91): 27 March 1993 v West Indies
- Last ODI: 7 April 1995 v India

Career statistics
Competition	Test	ODI
Matches	2	2
Runs scored	34	2
Batting average	17.00	2.00
100s/50s	0/0	0/0
Top score	25	2
Balls bowled	432	96
Wickets	2	0
Bowling average	115.00	–
5 wickets in innings	0	–
10 wickets in match	0	–
Best bowling	2/147	–
Catches/stumpings	0/–	0/–
- Source: ESPNcricinfo, 4 February 2017

Mohammad Nadeem Khan (Urdu: محمد ندیم خان; born 10 December 1969) is a Pakistani cricket administrator, coach and former cricketer who played in two Test matches and two One Day Internationals from 1993 to 1999.

He's the older brother of former Pakistan captain & wicket-keeper Moin Khan.

== Cricket career ==
Nadeem didn't have a long international cricketing career, best known for a controversial run-out of Sachin Tendulkar he was involved in as a substitute fielder during the 1998–99 Asian Test Championship.

He was an effective spinner who has played for Northern Gymkhana Karachi and Sheffield Collegiate C.C. I XI.

In April 2019, he was named in the MCC team that played in the 2019 Central American Cricket Championship in Mexico.

== Post-retirement ==
=== Cricket administration ===
In 2016, Nadeem became the United Bank Limited Sports Complex's head of cricket and was noticed for the positive changes he brought in the UBL's cricket academy that he headed, also managing the UBL cricket team with success.

In November 2017, Nadeem was appointed as manager of the Pakistan Super League franchise Multan Sultans. He has also managed Pakistan U19 sides in two Asia Cups and an ICC U19 Cricket World Cup in 2018–19.

In October 2019, the Pakistan Cricket Board appointed him as the coordinator of the national selection committee, having previously served on the national selection committee in the 2016–17 season.

In May 2020, he was appointed as the PCB's director of high performance.

In June 2022, he was made director of the inaugural season of the Pakistan Junior League.

=== Coaching career ===
Nadeem is an ECB certified level 2 coach who has previously worked as head coach at the Michael Vaughan Academy and the Sheffield Collegiate Cricket Club from 2008 to 2010.

=== Business ventures ===
He owned a Mexican restaurant in Sheffield, in the UK, and has also served as the director and general manager of other restaurants for many years.
