= Belize National Cricket Association =

Governing body of cricket in Belize

Coordinates: 17.55713°N 88.53414°W

- Sport: Cricket
- Jurisdiction: Belize
- Abbreviation: BNCA
- Founded: 1997
- Affiliation: International Cricket Council
- Affiliation date: 1997
- Headquarters: Bermudian Landing, Belize
- President: Roy A. Young
- Vice president: Daphne McFadzean
- Secretary: Gayle Thompson
- Sponsor: ICC, Bowen & Bowen, Governor General

Official website
- www.belizecricket.bz
- Other key staff: Dian Baldwin
- (Belize)

The Belize National Cricket Association is the national governing body of cricket in Belize, established in 1997. It gained affiliation with the International Cricket Council in 1997, the Belize National Sports Council in 2016, and the Belize Olympic Committee in 2020.

== History ==
The Association was established and affiliated to the International Cricket Council, as an affiliate member, in 1997. Its inaugural president was Elston Wade Jr., who served in office until 2011. It was admitted into the Belize National Sports Council in 2016, and the Belize Olympic Committee on 18 July 2020. The Association has recently sought to strengthen its relationship with Cricket West Indies.

Notably, in 2019, the Association organised the Level 1 training and certification, by Cricket West Indies, of ten amateur coaches, thought to be 'the only known qualified coaches in the country.' (Note: Namely, Cornell Brown, Marva Anthony, Delda Blades, Kenton Young, Daphne McFadzean, Derrick McFadzean, Gareth Joseph, Randy Rhaburn, Michael Sobers, and Berisford Reyes (BNCA ndb, timeline). In 2016, it was reported that the country counted with only one qualified coach, viz. Conway Young (Coyne 2016, sec. 3).) It also spearheaded the formation of a national women's team during the same year, an achievement the Association has deemed 'a milestone in cricket in Belize.'

== Statistics ==
The Belize District is considered the main home of cricket in Belize, and the Harrison Parks National Cricket Championship is the main event on the calendar. This championship, held every year from January to August, was under the control of the BNCA until 2006, when it was ceded to affiliate member, the Belize District Cricket Association.

In 2009, the Belize National Cricket Association has once again resumed the administration of the Harrison Parks National Cricket Competition. The 2009 Champion is Excellence of Double Head Cabbage and the Sub-champion is Wicked Eleven of Flowers Bank. Three members of these two teams are members of the Belize National Senior Cricket Team. They are Kene Broaster and Percy Flowers of Excellence and Winston Flowers of Flowers Bank. For the first time ever, the Belize National Under 15 Team participated in a regional competition, which was held in Bahamas in August, 2009. Belize did not win but was very competitive.

The Belize National Cricket Team won the silver medal in the ICC Americas Division 3 Tournament, which was held in Chile in October, 2009.

The Association is headed by its long-time president, Elston Wade and consists of the following executive officers: Felix Sutherland, Marjorie Parks, Llewellyn Sutherland, Gayle Thompson, Dwight Gabb and Gilroy Middleton. The Cricket Development Officer is Enfield Pook.

== See also ==
- Belize national cricket team
- Belize women's national cricket team

== Notes and references ==
=== Full citations ===
1. "Belize Cricket Update". Amandala. Belize City. 20 March 2021.
2. "Belize's Cricket Team Heads to Antigua for Regional Competition". News 5. Belize City: Great Belize Productions. 2 November 2021.
3. "Belize National Cricket Association". Associate Members. Dubai: ICC. Archived from the original on 12 July 2022.
4. "Contact Us". Bermudian Landing: BNCA. Archived from the original on 5 November 2021.
5. "Cricket is becoming more popular in Belize". Breaking Belize News. 19 August 2019.
6. "Ireland and Afghanistan ICC newest full members amid wide-ranging governance reform". International Cricket Council. 22 June 2017.
7. "Our Executive Officers". Bermudian Landing: BNCA. Archived from the original on 5 November 2021.
8. "Our History". Bermudian Landing: BNCA. Archived from the original on 31 October 2021.
9. "Sponsors". Bermudian Landing: BNCA. Archived from the original on 5 November 2021.
10. Abraham, Timothy; Coyne, James (2021). Evita burned down our pavilion : a cricketing odyssey through Latin America. London: Constable. ISBN 978-1472132536. OCLC 1100631915.
11. Coyne, James (February 2016). "Lit pitches, murdered wickets: The joys (and sorrows) of cricket in the Belize River Valley". Cricket Monthly. London: ESPNcricinfo.
