= 1910–11 Liga Mexicana de Football Amateur Association season =

Liga Mexicana de Football Amateur Association
- Season: 1910–11
- Champions: Reforma AC (5th title)
- Matches: 11
- Goals: 35 (3.18 per match)

The 1910–11 season was the 9th edition of the Liga Mexicana de Football Amateur Association. British Club and Popo FC merged into a single team called British-Popo, and also Club México joined the league.

== Standings ==
Pos	Team	Pld	W	D	L	GF	GA	GD	Pts
1	Reforma AC	5	4	1	0	13	3	+10	9
2	Pachuca AC	5	1	3	1	10	6	+4	5
3	British-Popo	6	2	1	3	8	14	−6	5
4	Club México	6	1	1	4	4	12	−8	3

Source: RSSSF
