= 2019 Central American Cricket Championship =

2019 Central American Cricket Championship (Men)
- Dates: 25 – 28 April 2019
- Cricket format: Twenty20 International
- Tournament format(s): Round Robin, Final
- Host: Mexico
- Champions: Belize
- Runners-up: MCC
- Participants: 5
- Matches: 11
- Most runs: (Panama) Yusuf Ebrahim (145)
- Most wickets: (Belize) Aaron Muslar (13)

The 2019 Central American Cricket Championship was a cricket tournament held in Mexico from 25 to 28 April 2019. It was the seventh edition of the Central American Cricket Championship and the first since the ICC granted Twenty20 International (T20I) status to matches between all of its Members.

== Men's championship ==
The five participating teams were the national sides of Belize, Costa Rica, Mexico and Panama, as well as a side representing the MCC. The matches were played at the Reforma Athletic Club in the city of Naucalpan, just to the northwest of Mexico City. All participating nations made their T20I debuts during the tournament (matches involving the MCC did not have T20I status). MCC were the defending champions, but were defeated by five wickets in the final by Belize.

=== Squads ===
Belize	Costa Rica	MCC	Mexico	Panama
Kenton Young (c); Aaron Arnold; Andrew Banner; Garret Banner; Glenford Banner; Herbert Banner; Ian Broaster; Keenan Flowers; George Hyde; Gareth Joseph; Aaron Muslar; Glenroy Reynolds; Kenroy Reynolds; Bernan Stephenson; Travis Stephenson	Christopher Prasad (c); Joel Cutinho; Prajwel Cutinho; Oscar Fournier; Nanda Kumar; Rodrick McClean; Daniel Mejia; Gopinath Murali; Sham Murari; Sudesh Pillai; Sachin Ravikumar; Deepak Rawat; Oswald Sam Arthur; Esteban Soto; Zain ul Tashnam	Storm Green (c); Kez Ahmed; Richard Atkins; Guy Balmford; James Hawley; Tom Jenkins; Nadeem Khan; Dan Lewis-Williams; Clint McCabe; Rishi Pandya; Alistair Ponder; Sam Smith; Christopher Vernon	Tarun Sharma (c); Revanakumar Ankad; Puneet Arora; Buddhadeb Banerjee; Pradeep Chandran; Gaurav Dutta; Luis Hermida; Shashikant Laxman; Rama Inampud; Shantanu Kaveri; Kaushal Kumar; Shahzad Muhammad; Ashwin Sathya; Nithin Shetty; Jagdeesh Umanath; Sanjay Zargar	Imran Bulbulia (c); Breeze Ahir; Dilip Dahyabhai Ahir; Anilkumar Natubhai Ahir; Khengar Ahir; Vishal Ahir; Vimal Chandra; Mahmad Data; Yusuf Ebrahim; Abdullah Jasat; Mahmud Jasat; Rizwan Mangera; Mitulkumar Patel; Dipakkumar Patel; Parth Jayeshbhai Patel; Parish Bharat Patel; Mohmad Sohel Patel; Vijay Sachdev

=== Points table ===
Team	P	W	L	T	NR	Pts	NRR
MCC	4	4	0	0	0	8	+1.893
Belize	4	3	1	0	0	6	+1.192
Panama	4	2	2	0	0	4	+0.346
Mexico	4	1	3	0	0	2	–1.182
Costa Rica	4	0	4	0	0	0	–2.255

=== Round-robin ===
25 April 2019
08:00
Scorecard

Mexico; 108/9 (20 overs)	v	Belize; 112/6 (12.3 overs)
Pradeep Chandran 23 (28); Aaron Muslar 3/18 (4 overs)		Bernan Stephenson 48 (27); Rama Inampud 2/29 (4 overs)

Belize won by 4 wickets
Reforma Athletic Club, Naucalpan
Umpires: Supratim Das (Mex) and Kanti Lal Patel (Mex)
Player of the match: Bernan Stephenson (Blz)

- Belize won the toss and elected to field.
- Revanakumar Ankad, Buddhadeb Banerjee, Pradeep Chandran, Gaurav Dutta, Shashikant Laxman, Rama Inampud, Shantanu Kaveri, Kaushal Kumar, Ashwin Sathya, Tarun Sharma, Jagdeesh Umanath (Mex), Andrew Banner, Glenford Banner, Herbert Banner, Keenan Flowers, George Hyde, Gareth Joseph, Aaron Muslar, Glenroy Reynolds, Kenroy Reynolds, Bernan Stephenson and Kenton Young (Blz) all made their T20I debuts.
- Belize and Mexico both played their first men's T20I match.

25 April 2019
11:30
Scorecard

Costa Rica; 112/5 (20 overs)	v	Panama; 113/3 (15.4 overs)
Joel Cutinho 32 (37); Dilip Dahyabhai Ahir 2/11 (2 overs)		Yusuf Ebrahim 35* (23); Zain ul Tashnam 1/16 (4 overs)

Panama won by 7 wickets
Reforma Athletic Club, Naucalpan
Umpires: Bob Baxter (Mex) and Dilip Pachichigar (Mex)
Player of the match: Imran Bulbulia (Pan)

- Costa Rica won the toss and elected to bat.
- Joel Cutinho, Oscar Fournier, Nanda Kumar, Daniel Mejia, Gopinath Murali, Sham Murari, Sudesh Pillai, Christopher Prasad, Sachin Ravikumar, Oswald Sam Arthur, Zain ul Tashnam (Crc), Anilkumar Natubhai Ahir, Dilip Dahyabhai Ahir, Khengar Ahir, Imran Bulbulia, Vimal Chandra, Mahmad Data, Yusuf Ebrahim, Dipakkumar Patel, Mitulkumar Patel, Parish Bharat Patel and Vijay Sachdev (Pan) all made their T20I debuts.
- Costa Rica and Panama both played their first men's T20I match.

25 April 2019
15:00
Scorecard

Belize; 125/9 (20 overs)	v	MCC; 129/6 (18.4 overs)
Aaron Muslar 35 (44); Clint McCabe 4/24 (4 overs)		James Hawley 29 (37); Aaron Muslar 2/16 (2 overs)

MCC won by 4 wickets
Reforma Athletic Club, Naucalpan
Umpires: Amol Bhatt (Mex) and Dilip Pachichigar (Mex)
Player of the match: Clint McCabe (MCC)

- Belize won the toss and elected to bat.

26 April 2019
08:00
Scorecard

Costa Rica; 133/7 (20 overs)	v	Mexico; 134/7 (19.2 overs)
Joel Cutinho 46 (40); Sanjay Zargar 2/22 (3 overs)		Revanakumar Ankad 40* (38); Sudesh Pillai 3/14 (4 overs)

Mexico won by 3 wickets
Reforma Athletic Club, Naucalpan
Umpires: Bob Baxter (Mex) and Dilip Pachichigar (Mex)
Player of the match: Ashwin Sathya (Mex)

- Costa Rica won the toss and elected to bat.
- Puneet Arora, Shahzad Muhammad, Nithin Shetty and Sanjay Zargar (Mex) all made their T20I debuts.

26 April 2019
11:30
Scorecard

Belize; 157/5 (20 overs)	v	Panama; 148/8 (20 overs)
Glenford Banner 47 (38); Dipakkumar Patel 2/17 (4 overs)		Mohmad Sohel Patel 40 (33); Kenroy Reynolds 3/26 (4 overs)

Belize won by 9 runs
Reforma Athletic Club, Naucalpan
Umpires: Bob Baxter (Mex) and Kanti Lal Patel (Mex)
Player of the match: Glenford Banner (Blz)

- Panama won the toss and elected to field.
- Travis Stephenson (Blz), Parth Jayeshbhai Patel and Mohmad Sohel Patel (Pan) all made their T20I debuts.

26 April 2019
15:00
Scorecard

MCC; 135/7 (20 overs)	v	Mexico; 127/9 (20 overs)
Richard Atkins 40 (23); Revanakumar Ankad 3/25 (4 overs)		Puneet Arora 50 (41); Richard Atkins 4/19 (4 overs)

MCC won by 8 runs
Reforma Athletic Club, Naucalpan
Umpires: Dilip Pachichigar (Mex) and Kanti Lal Patel (Mex)
Player of the match: Richard Atkins (MCC)

- Mexico won the toss and elected to field.

27 April 2019
08:00
Scorecard

Panama; 148/6 (20 overs)	v	Mexico; 115/6 (20 overs)
Yusuf Ebrahim 72 (53); Nithin Shetty 3/17 (4 overs)		Tarun Sharma 49* (42); Khengar Ahir 2/18 (4 overs)

Panama won by 33 runs
Reforma Athletic Club, Naucalpan
Umpires: Bob Baxter (Mex) and Amol Bhatt (Mex)
Player of the match: Yusuf Ebrahim (Pan)

- Mexico won the toss and elected to field.
- Vishal Ahir (Pan) made his T20I debut.

27 April 2019
11:30
Scorecard

Costa Rica; 89 (19.3 overs)	v	Belize; 92/5 (14.5 overs)
Joel Cutinho 15 (21); Aaron Muslar 3/10 (3 overs)		Kenton Young 27* (22); Oswald Sam Arthur 2/21 (4 overs)

Belize won by 5 wickets
Reforma Athletic Club, Naucalpan
Umpires: Supratim Das (Mex) and Kanti Lal Patel (Mex)
Player of the match: Aaron Muslar (Blz)

- Costa Rica won the toss and elected to bat.
- Garret Banner (Blz) and Esteban Soto (Crc) both made their T20I debuts.

27 April 2019
15:00
Scorecard

Panama; 97 (20 overs)	v	MCC; 99/4 (16.1 overs)
Vishal Ahir 19 (25); Sam Smith 4/20 (4 overs)		James Hawley 34 (34); Khengar Ahir 2/18 (4 overs)

MCC won by 6 wickets
Reforma Athletic Club, Naucalpan
Umpires: Amol Bhatt (Mex) and Dilip Pachichigar (Mex)
Player of the match: Sam Smith (MCC)

- Panama won the toss and elected to bat.

28 April 2019
08:00
Scorecard

MCC; 179/3 (20 overs)	v	Costa Rica; 79/9 (20 overs)
Guy Balmford 107* (61); Mattew George 2/49 (4 overs)		Nanda Kumar 36 (45); Clint McCabe 2/8 (4 overs)

MCC won by 100 runs
Reforma Athletic Club, Naucalpan
Umpires: Amol Bhatt (Mex) and Supratim Das (Mex)
Player of the match: Guy Balmford (MCC)

- Costa Rica won the toss and elected to field.

=== Final ===
28 April 2019
15:00
Scorecard

MCC; 137/9 (20 overs)	v	Belize; 138/5 (18.2 overs)
James Hawley 37 (31); Aaron Muslar 3/19 (4 overs)		Andrew Banner 53 (52); Guy Balmford 2/5 (1 over)

Belize won by 5 wickets
Reforma Athletic Club, Naucalpan
Player of the match: Andrew Banner (Blz)

- Belize won the toss and elected to field.

== Women's championship ==
A women's championship, consisting of a three-match series between Mexico and Costa Rica, took place alongside the men's event. The final match of the series was played at the Reforma Athletic Club ahead of the men's final. The first two matches had Women's Twenty20 International (WT20I) status.

2019 Central American Cricket Championship (Women)
	Mexico women	Costa Rica women
- Dates: 26 – 28 April 2019
Captains	Caroline Owen	Sofia Martinez

Twenty20 International series
- Results: Mexico women won the 3-match series 3–0
Most runs	Ana Montenegro (75)	Melissa Vega (11); Wendy Delgado (11)
Most wickets	Tania Salcedo (7)	Esteffany Estrada (3)

=== Squads ===
Mexico	Costa Rica
Caroline Owen (c); Aida Tovar; Aileen Fernandez; Ana Septien; Ana Montenegro; Anjuli Ladron; Anyel Aguilar; Erika Fernandez; Gabriela Morales; Julieta Marquina; Magdalena De Gante; Maria Pacheco; Tania Salcedo	Sofia Martinez (c); Amanda Martinez; Amelia Campos; Anasis Castrillo; Deborah Clements; Esteffany Estrada; Irena Guevara; Josette Lopez; Melissa Vega; Nimia Ramirez; Odalis Rios; Wendy Delgado; Yerelin Hernandez

=== Matches ===
26 April 2019
10:00
Scorecard

Mexico; 164/8 (20 overs)	v	Costa Rica; 63 (15.3 overs)
Caroline Owen 48* (50); Nimia Ramirez 2/9 (2 overs)		Josette Lopez 5 (9); Tania Salcedo 3/10 (3 overs)

Mexico won by 101 runs
Las Cabellerizas, Naucalpan
Umpires: Amol Bhatt (Mex) and Supratim Das (Mex)
Player of the match: Caroline Owen (Mex)

- Costa Rica won the toss and elected to field.
- Magdalena De Gante, Julieta Marquina, Gabriela Morales (Mex), Amanda Martinez, Amelia Campos, Esteffany Estrada, Josette Lopez, Irena Guevara, Melissa Vega, Nimia Ramirez, Odalis Rios, Yerelin Hernandez, Sofia Martinez and Wendy Delgado (Crc) all made their WT20I debuts.

26 April 2019
14:00
Scorecard

Costa Rica; 80 (19.4 overs)	v	Mexico; 82/0 (7.2 overs)
Melissa Vega 5 (5); Tania Salcedo 2/10 (4 overs)		Ana Montenegro 40* (29)

Mexico won by 10 wickets
Las Cabellerizas, Naucalpan
Umpires: Amol Bhatt (Mex) and Supratim Das (Mex)
Player of the match: Tania Salcedo (Mex)

- Mexico won the toss and elected to field.
- Anasis Castrillo (Crc) made her WT20I debut.

28 April 2019
11:30
Scorecard

Mexico; 158/4 (20 overs)	v	Costa Rica; 108/8 (20 overs)
Ana Montenegro 34* (49); Esteffany Estrada 2/22 (3 overs)		Melissa Vega 6 (18); Aileen Fernandez 2/19 (4 overs)

Mexico won by 50 runs
Reforma Athletic Club, Naucalpan
Umpires: Amol Bhatt (Mex) and Dilip Pachichigar (Mex)
Player of the match: Ana Montenegro (Mex)

- Costa Rica won the toss and elected to field.
