= Belize national cricket team =

Belize
- Association: Belize National Cricket Association

Personnel
- Captain: Jermaine Pook

International Cricket Council
- ICC status: Associate member (2017)
- ICC region: Americas
| ICC Rankings | Current | Best-ever |
| T20I | 74th | 44th (2 May 2019) |

International cricket
- First international: British Honduras v. MCC (Belize City; 4 April 1960)

T20 Internationals
- First T20I: v Mexico at Reforma Athletic Club, Naucalpan; 25 April 2019
- Last T20I: v Bahamas at White Hill Field, Sandys Parish; 27 June 2026
| T20Is | Played | Won/Lost |
| Total | 20 | 8/12 (0 ties, 0 no result) |
| This year | 3 | 1/2 (0 ties, 0 no result) |
T20I kit
- As of 27 June 2026

The Belize national cricket team represents the country of Belize in international cricket. The team is organised by the Belize National Cricket Association, which has been an affiliate member of the International Cricket Council (ICC) since 1997 and an associate member since 2017. A team representing British Honduras had debuted in 1960, when England visited at the conclusion of its 1959–60 tour of the West Indies. Belize's first international tournament was a qualifier for the 2004 ICC Americas Championship, and the team has competed regularly in ICC Americas tournaments since then.

In April 2018, the ICC decided to grant full Twenty20 International (T20I) status to all its members. Therefore, all Twenty20 matches played between Belize and other ICC members after 1 January 2019 will be a full T20I.

== History ==
Belize became an affiliate member of the ICC in 1997. Their first international match after affiliating was played against Suriname on 23 March 2004, in the 2004 Americas Affiliate Tournament – a match which they won.

In 2006, they hosted the first ever Central American Cricket Championship, where they won the tournament that also featured Costa Rica and Mexico. Later in the year, they played in the second division of the ICC Americas Championship, finishing fifth of five teams. As a result, they were relegated to 2008 Division Three.

Belize were intended to play in the 2007 Central American Cricket Championship, but pulled out at the last minute giving El Salvador the chance to participate.

In the 2008 Division Three tournament, although they were favourites to win, Belize finished third of five teams. Later that year, they took part in the 2nd Easter Cup held in El Salvador. Belize beat Costa Rica and Mexico to finish in first place in the Twenty20 competition.

Belize took part in the 2009 Central American Championship, finishing third of five teams. They were beaten by close rivals Mexico in the new Twenty20 format of the competition.

At the 2011 Americas Twenty20 Division Two tournament, held in Suriname in April 2011, Belize were coached by Barbadian Wendell Coppin, who was funded by ICC Americas.

=== 2018-Present ===
In April 2018, the ICC decided to grant full Twenty20 International (T20I) status to all its members. Therefore, all Twenty20 matches played between Belize and other ICC members after 1 January 2019 will be a full T20I.

In September 2018, Belize took part in 2018–19 ICC T20 World Cup Americas Qualifier, finished on 4th place.

Belize played their first ever Twenty20 International match against Mexico in 2019 Central American Cricket Championship.

25 April 2019
08:00
Scorecard

| Mexico; 108/9 (20 overs) | v | Belize; 112/6 (12.3 overs) |
| Pradeep Chandran 23 (28); Aaron Muslar 3/18 (4 overs) | | Bernan Stephenson 48 (27); Rama Inampud 2/29 (4 overs) |

Belize won by 4 wickets
Reforma Athletic Club, Naucalpan
Umpires: Supratim Das (Mex) and Kanti Lal Patel (Mex)
Player of the match: Bernan Stephenson (Blz)

- Belize won the toss and elected to field.
- First ever T20I match for Belize.

In April 2019, Belize won 2019 Central American Cricket Championship, after beating MCC by 5 wickets in final.

== Tournament history ==
=== T20 World Cup Americas Regional Final ===
ICC T20 World Cup Americas Regional Final (Note: Regional Final of the ICC Americas region is the final stage of qualification for T20 World Cup from 2023 edition.) records
| Year | Round | Position | GP | W | L | T | NR |
|---|---|---|---|---|---|---|---|
| (Bermuda) 2019 | Did not qualify | | | | | | |
| (Antigua and Barbuda) 2021 | Round-robin | 7/7 | 6 | 1 | 5 | 0 | 0 |
| (Bermuda) 2023 | Did not qualify | | | | | | |
| (Canada) 2025 | Did not qualify | | | | | | |
| Total | 1/4 | 0 Titles | 6 | 1 | 5 | 0 | 0 |

- A - Advanced to global qualifier
- Q - Qualified for T20 World Cup

=== Other tournaments ===
| T20WC Americas Sub-regional Qualifiers | ICC Americas Championship | Central American Championship |
|---|---|---|
| 2018: 4th place; 2023: Did not participate; 2024: 5th place | 2000—2004: Did not participate; 2006 (Division two): 5th place — relegated; 2008 (Division three): 3rd place — remained; 2009-10 (Division three): 2nd place — remained; 2011 (Division three): Winners — promoted; 2011 (Division two): 3rd place — remained; 2013 (Division two): 3rd place | 2006: Winners; 2007: Did not participate; 2009: 3rd place; 2015: Did not participate; 2019: Winners; 2023: Round one (as Belize 1 & Belize 2) |

== Records ==
International Match Summary — Belize

Last updated 27 June 2026

Playing Record
| Format | M | W | L | T | NR | Inaugural Match |
| Twenty20 Internationals | 20 | 8 | 12 | 0 | 0 | 25 April 2019 |

=== Twenty20 International ===
- Highest team total: 157/5 v Panama on 26 April 2019 at Reforma Athletic Club, Naucalpan
- Highest individual score: 70*, Lawrence Bonner v Panama on 14 December 2024 at Club San Albano, Burzaco
- Best bowling figures in an innings: 6/16, Maurice Castillo v Panama on 14 December 2024 at Club San Albano, Burzaco

Most T20I runs for Belize

| Player | Runs | Average | Career span |
|---|---|---|---|
| Maurice Castillo | 286 | 22.07 | 2021–2026 |
| Bernan Stephenson | 268 | 20.61 | 2019–2024 |
| Alexander Oxley | 256 | 32.00 | 2024–2026 |
| Glenford Banner | 186 | 12.40 | 2019–2024 |
| Kenton Young | 156 | 22.28 | 2019–2021 |

Most T20I wickets for Belize

| Player | Wickets | Average | Career span |
|---|---|---|---|
| Maurice Castillo | 22 | 11.72 | 2021–2026 |
| Lawrence Banner | 18 | 10.38 | 2024–2026 |
| Bernan Stephenson | 11 | 18.45 | 2019–2026 |
| Nathan Banner | 11 | 24.72 | 2021–2026 |
| Garret Banner | 11 | 29.09 | 2019–2024 |

T20I record versus other nations

Records complete to T20I #3998. Last updated 27 June 2026.

| Opponent | M | W | L | T | NR | First match | First win |
|---|---|---|---|---|---|---|---|
vs Associate Members
| Argentina | 2 | 0 | 2 | 0 | 0 | 10 November 2021 | |
| Bahamas | 3 | 0 | 3 | 0 | 0 | 11 November 2021 | |
| Bermuda | 3 | 0 | 3 | 0 | 0 | 13 November 2021 | |
| Brazil | 2 | 2 | 0 | 0 | 0 | 15 December 2024 | 15 December 2024 |
| Canada | 1 | 0 | 1 | 0 | 0 | 8 November 2021 | |
| Cayman Islands | 1 | 0 | 1 | 0 | 0 | 8 December 2024 | |
| Costa Rica | 1 | 1 | 0 | 0 | 0 | 27 April 2019 | 27 April 2019 |
| Mexico | 2 | 2 | 0 | 0 | 0 | 25 April 2019 | 25 April 2019 |
| Panama | 3 | 3 | 0 | 0 | 0 | 26 April 2019 | 26 April 2019 |
| Suriname | 1 | 0 | 1 | 0 | 0 | 16 December 2024 | |
| United States | 1 | 0 | 1 | 0 | 0 | 7 November 2021 | |

== Current squad ==
Updated as on 6 December 2024

This lists all the active players who played for Belize in the 2024 Men's T20 World Cup Americas Sub-regional Qualifier.

| Name | Age | Batting style | Bowling style | Last T20I | Note(s) |
Batters
| Ordell Casasola | 26 | Right-handed | Right-arm off break | (Suriname) 2024 | |
| Alexander Oxley | 26 | Right-handed | Right-arm off break | (Suriname) 2024 | |
| Jaron Pakeman | 25 | Right-handed | Right-arm off break | (Suriname) 2024 | |
All-rounders
| Garret Banner | 24 | Right-handed | Right-arm medium | (Suriname) 2024 | |
| Glenford Banner | 27 | Right-handed | Right-arm medium | (Suriname) 2024 | |
| Nathan Banner | 21 | Left-handed | Left-arm medium-fast | (Suriname) 2024 | |
| Lawrence Bonner | 27 | Right-handed | Right-arm medium | (Suriname) 2024 | |
| Brian Cassasola | 25 | Left-handed | Right-arm medium | —N/a | |
| Maurice Castillo | 23 | Left-handed | Right-arm off break | (Suriname) 2024 | Stand-in captain |
| Bernan Stephenson | 29 | Left-handed | Left-arm medium | (Suriname) 2024 | |
| Keagan Tillet | 25 | Right-handed | Right-arm medium-fast | (Bermuda) 2024 | |
Wicket-keepers
| Clint Stephenson | 27 | Right-handed | —N/a | (Bermuda) 2024 | |
| Javonn Wade | 33 | Right-handed | —N/a | —N/a | |
Pace bowlers
| Jermaine Pook | 41 | Right-handed | Right-arm medium | (Suriname) 2024 | Captain |
| Russhane Jones | 29 | Right-handed | Right-arm medium | (Bermuda) 2024 | |
| Brandon Lewis | —N/a | Right-handed | Right-arm medium | (Brazil) 2024 | |

== See also ==
- List of Belize Twenty20 International cricketers
