= Dan Lewis-Williams =

English cricketer (born 1993)

Personal information
- Born: 12 October 1993 (age 33)
- Source: Cricinfo, 29 April 2019

Dan Lewis-Williams (born 12 October 1993) is an English cricketer. He made his first-class debut on 2 April 2015, for Cardiff MCCU against Glamorgan, as part of the 2015 Marylebone Cricket Club University fixtures. In April 2019, he was named in the MCC team that played in the 2019 Central American Cricket Championship in Mexico.
