= List of Belize women Twenty20 International cricketers =

This is a list of Belizean women Twenty20 International cricketers. A Twenty20 International is an international cricket match between two representative teams. A Twenty20 International is played under the rules of Twenty20 cricket. In April 2018, the International Cricket Council (ICC) granted full international status to Twenty20 women's matches played between member sides from 1 July 2018 onwards. The Belize women's team made their Twenty20 International debut on 13 December 2019 during a tour of Costa Rica.

The list is arranged in the order in which each player won her first Twenty20 cap. Where more than one player won her first Twenty20 cap in the same match, those players are listed alphabetically by surname.

== Key ==
General

- ‡ – Captain
- † – Wicket-keeper
- First – Year of debut
- Last – Year of latest game
- Mat – Number of matches played

Batting

- Runs – Runs scored in career
- HS – Highest score
- Avg – Runs scored per dismissal
- * – Batsman remained not out
- 50 – Number of half centuries

Bowling

- Wkt – Wickets taken in career
- BBI – Best bowling in an innings
- Ave – Average runs per wicket

Fielding

- Ca – Catches taken
- St – Stumpings affected

== Players ==
Last updated 15 December 2019.

Belize women T20I cricketers
General					Batting				Bowling				Fielding		Ref
No.	Name	First	Last	Mat	Runs	HS	Avg	50	Balls	Wkt	BBI	Ave	Ca	St	Ref
1	Marva Anthony	2019	2019	6	131	35*	65.50	0	54	3	1/5	10.66	2	0	
2	Dian Baldwin‡	2019	2019	5	29	15	7.25	0	78	3	1/7	15.00	2	0	
3	Georgia Joseph	2019	2019	5	11	9	11.00	0	–	–	–	–	0	0	
4	Yvette Reynolds	2019	2019	2	11	11	11.00	0	–	–	–	–	0	0	
5	Cathleen Rhaburn	2019	2019	5	10	4*	5.00	0	9	2	1/6	6.00	0	0	
6	Ranisha Rhaburn	2019	2019	6	21	10	4.20	0	48	5	3/20	7.80	0	0	
7	Shanna Robinson	2019	2019	5	10	5	5.00	0	–	–	–	–	0	0	
8	Lin Smith	2019	2019	6	26	8	8.66	0	108	3	2/7	31.00	2	0	
9	Arden Stephenson†‡	2019	2019	6	111	54*	27.75	1	–	–	–	–	0	2	
10	Kristy Terry	2019	2019	6	70	31*	14.00	0	138	11	4/10	7.54	1	0	
11	Yolanda Thompson	2019	2019	6	8	5	4.00	0	108	2	1/13	42.50	0	0	
12	Eileen Major	2019	2019	5	57	23*	19.00	0	84	5	2/17	17.80	0	0	
13	Atusha Reynolds	2019	2019	2	0	0	0.00	0	–	–	–	–	0	0	
14	Marsha Will	2019	2019	1	22	22*	–	0	–	–	–	–	0	0	
