= Belize women's cricket team in Costa Rica in 2019–20 =

	Cost Rica women	Belize women
- Dates: 13 – 15 December 2019
Captains	Mercia Lewis (Note: Wendy Delgado captained Costa Rica for the 6th WT20I.)	Dian Baldwin (Note: Arden Stephenson captained Belize for the 5th WT20I.)

Twenty20 International series
- Results: Belize women won the 6-match series 5–1
Most runs	Wendy Delgado (87)	Marva Anthony (131)
Most wickets	Amanda Martinez (5)	Kristy Terry (11)

The Belize women's cricket team toured Costa Rica in December 2019 to play a six-match bilateral Women's Twenty20 International (WT20I) series. The venue for all of the matches was the Los Reyes Polo Club in Guácima. These were the first WT20I matches for Belize since the ICC's announcement that full WT20I status would apply to all the matches played between women's teams of associate members after 1 July 2018. Belize won the series 5–1.

== Squads ==
Costa Rica	Belize
Mercia Lewis (c); Gabriela Arguedas; Amelia Campos; Scarlet Centeno; Tatiana Cerdas; Ana Cespedes; Wendy Delgado; Genesis Diaz; Estefanny Estrada; Amanda Martinez; Sofia Martinez; Kenia Molina; Joseth Mora; Nimia Ramirez; Audy Smith; Ana Wolfe	Dian Baldwin (c); Marva Anthony; Georgia Joseph; Eileen Major; Daphne McFadzean; Atusha Reynolds; Yvette Reynolds; Cathleen Rhaburn; Ranisha Rhaburn; Shanna Robinson; Lin Smith; Arden Stephenson; Kristy Terry; Yolanda Thompson; Marsha Will

== WT20I series ==
=== 1st WT20I ===
13 December 2019
09:00
Scorecard

Belize; 128/4 (17 overs)	v	Costa Rica; 65/4 (17 overs)
Arden Stephenson 54* (53); Wendy Delgado 2/28 (4 overs)		Wendy Delgado 15 (45); Kristy Terry 2/13 (4 overs)

Belize won by 63 runs
Los Reyes Polo Club, Guácima
Umpires: Rohan Shah (Can)
Player of the match: Arden Stephenson (Blz)

- Costa Rica won the toss and elected to field.
- The match was reduced to 17 overs per side.
- Gabriella Arguedas, Ana Cespedes, Genesis Diaz, Mercia Lewis, Audy Smith (Crc), Marva Anthony, Dian Baldwin, Georgia Joseph, Yvette Reynolds, Cathleen Rhaburn, Ranisha Rhaburn, Shanna Robinson, Lin Smith, Arden Stephenson, Kristy Terry and Yolanda Thompson (Blz) all made their WT20I debuts.

=== 2nd WT20I ===
13 December 2019
13:00
Scorecard

Costa Rica; 86/8 (20 overs)	v	Belize; 87/1 (11.3 overs)
Ana Cespedes 11 (33); Eileen Major 2/19 (3 overs)		Kristy Terry 31* (43); Nimia Ramirez 1/20 (3 overs)

Belize won by 8 wickets
Los Reyes Polo Club, Guácima
Umpires: Rohan Shah (Can)
Player of the match: Kristy Terry (Blz)

- Belize won the toss and elected to field.
- Ana Wolfe (Crc), Eileen Major and Atusha Reynolds (Blz) all made their WT20I debuts.

=== 3rd WT20I ===
14 December 2019
08:30
Scorecard

Belize; 125 (19 overs)	v	Costa Rica; 33 (11 overs)
Arden Stephenson 28 (16); Amanda Martinez 4/15 (4 overs)		Esteffany Estrada 10 (15); Kristy Terry 4/10 (3 overs)

Belize won by 92 runs
Los Reyes Polo Club, Guácima
Player of the match: Kristy Terry (Blz)

- Costa Rica won the toss and elected to field.
- Tatiana Cerdas, Kenia Molina and Joseth Mora (Crc) all made their WT20I debuts.
- Genesis Diaz (Crc) was replaced by Tatiana Cerdas at the start of the Costa Rica innings.

=== 4th WT20I ===
14 December 2019
13:00
Scorecard

Costa Rica; 113/2 (20 overs)	v	Belize; 107/7 (20 overs)
Sofia Martinez 20 (24); Marva Anthony 1/5 (2 overs)		Marva Anthony 30 (38); Estefanny Estrada 1/9 (2 overs)

Costa Rica won by 6 runs
Los Reyes Polo Club, Guácima
Player of the match: Sofia Martinez (Crc)

- Belize won the toss and elected to field.
- Scarlet Centeno (Crc) made her WT20I debut.

=== 5th WT20I ===
15 December 2019
08:30
Scorecard

Costa Rica; 95/9 (19 overs)	v	Belize; 98/7 (15.4 overs)
Sofia Martinez 23 (30); Eileen Major 2/17 (4 overs)		Marva Anthony 35* (38); Sofia Martinez 2/15 (4 overs)

Belize won by 3 wickets
Los Reyes Polo Club, Guácima
Player of the match: Marva Anthony (Blz)

- Costa Rica won the toss and elected to field.
- The match was reduced to 19 overs per side.

=== 6th WT20I ===
15 December 2019
13:00
Scorecard

Costa Rica; 110 (17.3 overs)	v	Belize; 111/6 (19 overs)
Wendy Delgado 39 (59); Ranisha Rhaburn 3/20 (4 overs); Kristy Terry 3/20 (4 overs)		Marva Anthony 28* (22); Amelia Campos 2/11 (4 overs)

Belize won by 4 wickets
Los Reyes Polo Club, Guácima
Player of the match: Ranisha Rhaburn (Blz)

- Costa Rica won the toss and elected to bat.
- Marsha Will (Blz) made her WT20I debut.
