= List of Costa Rica women Twenty20 International cricketers =

This is a list of Costa Rica women Twenty20 International cricketers. A Twenty20 International is an international cricket match between two representative teams, each having Twenty20 International status, as determined by the International Cricket Council (ICC). A Twenty20 International is played under the rules of Twenty20 cricket.

This list includes all players who have played at least one T20I match and is initially arranged in the order of debut appearance. Where more than one player won their first cap in the same match, those players are initially listed alphabetically at the time of debut.

== Key ==
General

- ‡ – Captain
- † – Wicket-keeper
- First – Year of debut
- Last – Year of latest game
- Mat – Number of matches played

Batting

- Runs – Runs scored in career
- HS – Highest score
- Avg – Runs scored per dismissal
- * – Batsman remained not out
- 50 – Number of half centuries

Bowling

- Wkt – Wickets taken in career
- BBI – Best bowling in an innings
- Ave – Average runs per wicket

Fielding

- Ca – Catches taken
- St – Stumpings affected

== Players ==
Last updated 25 September 2026.

Costa Rica women T20I cricketers
General					Batting				Bowling				Fielding		Ref
No.	Name	First	Last	Mat	Runs	HS	Avg	50	Balls	Wkt	BBI	Ave	Ca	St	Ref
1	Amelia Arias	2019	2019	7	16	7	3.20	0	102	4	2/11	23.75	0	0	
2	Anasis Castrillo	2019	2019	1	4	4	4.00	0	–	–	–	–	0	0	
3	Wendy Morales‡	2019	2026	15	101	39	11.22	0	207	12	3/21	19.75	3	0	
4	Esteffany Barboza	2019	2026	14	107	34	11.88	0	162	10	2/15	15.70	3	0	
5	Irene Melissa Guevara	2019	2019	1	0	0*	–	0	–	–	–	–	0	0	
6	Yerelin Contreras	2019	2019	2	0	0	0.00	0	36	2	2/24	25.00	0	0	
7	Josette Lopez	2019	2019	2	5	5	2.50	0	24	1	1/27	47.00	1	0	
8	Amanda Bolaños	2019	2026	13	13	5	1.85	0	183	5	4/15	41.40	2	0	
9	Sofía Bolaños†‡	2019	2026	14	103	30*	8.58	0	233	14	4/13	11.00	4	2	
10	Nimia Beckford‡	2019	2019	6	6	4	2.00	0	48	4	2/9	12.25	0	0	
11	Odalis Flores‡	2019	2024	5	12	4	2.40	0	18	0	–	–	1	0	
12	Melissa Barboza	2019	2019	2	5	5	2.50	0	36	0	–	–	0	0	
13	Gabriela Arguedas	2019	2019	3	0	0	0.00	0	6	0	–	–	1	0	
14	Ana Céspedes	2019	2024	6	15	11	3.75	0	–	–	–	–	2	0	
15	Génesis Díaz	2019	2019	4	2	2	2.00	0	30	0	–	–	0	0	
16	Mercia Lewis†‡	2019	2019	5	9	4	2.25	0	–	–	–	–	0	0	
17	Audy Smith	2019	2019	3	5	4	2.50	0	6	0	–	–	0	0	
18	Ana Wolfe	2019	2019	3	2	2	0.66	0	–	–	–	–	0	0	
19	Tatiana Cerdas	2019	2019	4	29	16*	9.66	0	–	–	–	–	0	0	
20	Kenia Molina	2019	2019	3	8	7	8.00	0	–	–	–	–	0	0	
21	Joseth Mora	2019	2019	3	7	4	3.50	0	30	3	1/5	13.00	0	0	
22	Scarlet Centeno	2019	2019	3	31	20	10.33	0	64	3	1/13	22.66	1	0	
23	Alba Alvarez	2024	2024	3	2	1	0.66	0	–	–	–	–	0	0	
24	Yoshanil Lewis	2024	2026	4	0	0	0.00	0	6	0	–	–	3	0	
25	Yerin Molina	2024	2026	8	1	1*	1.00	0	172	17	5/13	4.05	1	0	
26	Irshani Parks	2024	2024	3	15	8*	–	0	6	1	1/8	8.00	0	0	
27	Dunia Perez†	2024	2026	8	128	46	18.28	0	–	–	–	–	1	0	
28	María Jose Villalobos	2024	2024	2	1	1*	–	0	–	–	–	–	0	0	
29	Ana Cespedes	2026	2026	2	–	–	–	–	–	–	–	–	1	0	
30	Saray Lara	2026	2026	5	13	13*	–	0	54	1	1/13	54.00	0	0	
31	Maria Miranda	2026	2026	5	87	25*	29.00	0	–	–	–	–	0	0	
32	Jazmin Molina	2026	2026	5	–	–	–	–	102	5	2/5	14.00	2	0	
33	Maria Sanabria	2026	2026	1	–	–	–	–	–	–	–	–	0	0	
34	Ashley Diaz	2026	2026	2	–	–	–	–	24	3	3/18	7.00	0	0	
35	Angie Sanchez	2026	2026	2	–	–	–	–	11	1	1/13	13.00	0	0	
36	Fernanda Arauz	2026	2026	2	–	–	–	–	24	0	–	–	0	0	
37	Katheryn Calderon	2026	2026	2	–	–	–	–	36	1	1/4	26.00	0	0	
38	Maria Cano	2026	2026	2	21	12*	–	–	–	–	–	–	0	0	
39	Samarie Daley	2026	2026	2	–	–	–	–	–	–	–	–	0	0	
