= 1911–12 Liga Mexicana de Football Amateur Association season =

Liga Mexicana de Football Amateur Association
- Season: 1911–12
- Champions: Reforma AC (6th title)
- Matches: 7
- Goals: 12 (1.71 per match)

The 1911–12 season was the 10th edition of the Liga Mexicana de Football Amateur Association. It had 3 participating clubs, after British-Popo was divided and then British Club withdrew and Popo FC was dissolved. It was the first season with a playoff match to define the title, between Reforma AC and Pachuca AC. Reforma AC became the first team to win four consecutive titles.

== Standings ==
Pos	Team	Pld	W	D	L	GF	GA	GD	Pts
1	Reforma AC	4	3	0	1	7	1	+6	6
2	Pachuca AC	4	3	0	1	2	6	−4	6
3	Club México	4	0	0	4	0	2	−2	0

Source: RSSSF

A playoff match was held at Campo del Reforma to define the title on February 24, 1912.

- Playoff match: Reforma AC 3-0 Pachuca AC
