= Iberia de Córdoba S.C. =

Iberia de Córdoba
- Full name: Iberia de Córdoba Sporting Club
- Founded: 1915; 111 years ago
- Dissolved: 1943; 83 years ago
- Ground: Parque Deportivo Veracruzano; Veracruz, Veracruz
- Chairman: Santiago Olivarrieta
- League: Liga Amateur de Veracruz
Home colours	Away colours

Iberia de Córdoba Sporting Club was a Mexican football club based in the city of Veracruz, that played in the Liga Amateur de Veracruz and also participated in the 1921–22 season of the Liga Mexicana. The club was founded in 1915 and was dissolved in 1943, when the Liga Amateur de Veracruz folded to create the first national and professional league called Liga Mayor.

== History ==
Iberia de Córdoba Sporting Club was founded in 1915 in the south side of Veracruz by the Spaniards residing there at the time. The brothers Olavarrieta exported of coffee. Due to this the brothers decided to hire a large number of young Spanish immigrants already living partly in Córdoba and partly in the port city of Veracruz and brought to Córdoba. The brothers Olivarrieta who were wealthy Spanish immigrants quickly made their presence felt by signing quality Spanish players. For the first president of the team's financing partner Santiago Olavarrieta was appointed.

The club represented medium-low class of Veracruz.

In 1943, after the professionalization of football in Mexico, the club decided to merge with their cross town rivals Veracruz Sporting Club to create Tiburones Rojos de Veracruz in order to enroll in the Primera División de México.

== Honours ==
=== Amateur ===
- Liga Amateur de Veracruz: 1921–22, 1925–26, 1931–32

== See also ==
- Football in Mexico
