= Liga Amateur de Veracruz =

- Founded: 1908
- Folded: 1943
- Country: Mexico
- Divisions: 1
- Level on pyramid: 3
- Website: www.femexfut.org.mx

Liga Amateur de Veracruz was a former football league in Mexico founded by local businessmen in the state of Veracruz, where clubs from the State of Veracruz played from 1908 to 1943. The league folded in 1943 when the Primera División de México the first professional league in Mexico was founded. Several clubs came out of this league, including Orizaba, Veracruz Sporting Club, Iberia de Córdoba, Iberia de Veracruz, and Moctezuma.

== History ==
As early as 1894 clubs around the State of Veracruz were being founded and having friendly matches. The first clubs to be established in 1898 was Albinegros de Orizaba along with other clubs formed and sponsored by local factories. Most of the players who made up these clubs were workers and minors from the factories and mines around the city owned by Scottish and English men who had just arrived to the state. In 1915 an amateur league that would later be known as La Liga del Sur was established mainly due to the fact that the other closest league were Albinegros de Orizaba had taken part in 1902 winning the tournament that years was located in Mexico City.

== Amateur Era Occidental League Champions (1908–1943) ==
Season	Champion
1908–09	N/A
1909–10	N/A
1910–11	N/A
1911–12	N/A
1912–13	N/A
1913–14	N/A
1914–15	Veracruz Sporting Club
1915–16	Veracruz Sporting Club
1916–17	Veracruz Sporting Club
1917–18	Iberia de Veracruz
1918–19	N/A
1919–20	Iberia de Veracruz
1920–21	N/A
1921–22	Iberia de Córdoba
1922–23	N/A
1923–24	Espana de Veracruz
1924–25	Veracruz Sporting Club
1925–26	Iberia de Córdoba
1926–27	Veracruz Sporting Club
1927–28	Veracruz Sporting Club
1928–29	Veracruz Sporting Club
1929–30	Veracruz Sporting Club
1930–31	Veracruz Sporting Club
1931–32	Iberia de Córdoba
1932–33	N/A
1933–34	N/A
1934–35	Unión Deportiva Río Blanco
1935–36	Espana de Veracruz
1936–37	C.I.D.O.S.A
1937–38	Moctezuma de Orizaba
1938–39	Veracruz Sporting Club
1939–40	C.I.D.O.S.A
1940–41	Veracruz Sporting Club
1941–42	Espana de Veracruz
1942–43	Veracruz Sporting Club

== Champions Table ==
The total championships by each club are summarized in the following chart.

Team	Championships
Veracruz Sporting Club	11
Iberia de Veracruz	5
Iberia de Córdoba	3
C.I.D.O.S.A	2
Unión Deportiva Río Blanco	1
Moctezuma	1

CIDOSA = Compañia Industrial de Orizaba, S.A.
