= Veracruz Sporting Club =

Mexican football club

Veracruz SC
- Full name: Veracruz Sporting Club
- Nickname: Sporting
- Founded: 1908; 118 years ago 2011; 15 years ago (refounded)
- Ground: Estadio de la Universidad UVM Villa Rica; Veracruz, Veracruz
- League: Liga TDP
| Home colours | Away colours |

Veracruz Sporting Club is a Mexican football club based in the city of Veracruz, that competes in the Tercera División de México. The club participated in the amateur era of the Liga Mayor from 1931 to 1933, and also played in the Liga Amateur de Veracruz.

== History ==
The club was founded in 1908 by the native Spaniards living in Veracruz in the early 1900s. The first owners were the brothers Ángel and Mariano Rivera. The club played in the old Liga amateur de Veracruz from 1908 when in 1931 they were invited to play in the Liga Mayor after Club México and Real Club España left some spots open due to economical problems.

The Campeonato de Primera Fuerza decided to only admit clubs from Mexico City and the club returned to Liga Amateur de Veracruz where they managed to win 12 titles till the league folded in 1943 after the Mexican league in Mexico City was professionalize and allowed all clubs from the nation to take part in.

In the 1942-43 tournament, the club was merged with a cross town rival Iberia de Córdoba and formed Tiburones Rojos de Veracruz in order to take part of the 1943 Primera División de México tournament, and so came an end to a club who from 1908 to 1943 played many games and managed to win 12 domestic titles and various friendly matches.

=== Recent years ===
In 2011, the club was refounded and joined the Tercera División de México for the Apertura 2011 tournament.

== Honours ==
=== Amateur ===
- Liga Amateur de Veracruz: 1914-15, 1915–16, 1916–17, 1924–25, 1926–27, 1927–28, 1928–29, 1929–30, 1930–31, 1940–41, 1942–43

== See also ==
- Football in Mexico
- Iberia de Córdoba
- Tiburones Rojos de Veracruz
