= British Club (football) =

British FC
- Full name: British Football Club
- Nicknames: The Britishers; The Weares in Chocolate
- Short name: BC, BFC
- Founded: 1901; 125 years ago (as British Club)
- Dissolved: 1912; 114 years ago
- Ground: Campo del British Club; Mexico City
Home colours

British Football Club was a Mexican football club based in Mexico City, that played in the Liga Mexicana de Football Amateur Association from 1902 to 1912. Founded in 1901 under the name British Club, in the 1909–10 season it changed its name to British FC. In the 1910–11 season, it merged with Popo Park FC and changed its name to British-Popo. Finally, in the 1911–12season, it reverted to the name British FC.

== History ==
The club was founded in 1901 by Percy Clifford, a Cornish immigrant, who at the time was a member of the Club Reforma.

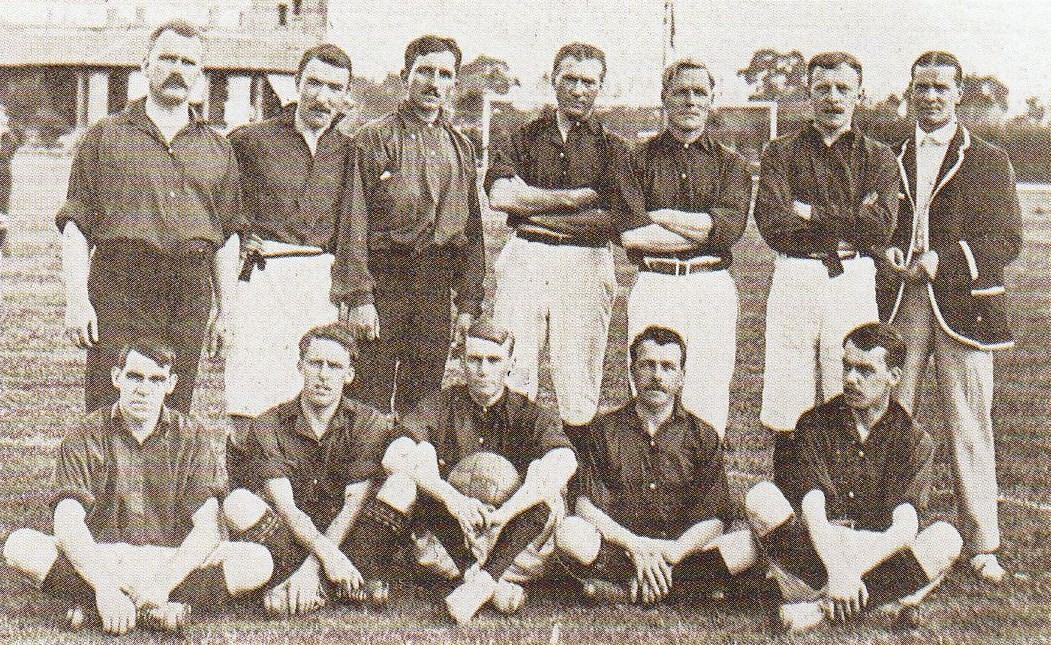
British Club squad in 1903, the first championship.

Clifford decided to dedicate his life to becoming one of the best players in the Mexican league and would later go on to become a manager and board member for the club. The club's main economic support came from the Club Británico, a British sports club in Mexico City, which was founded in 1899. The team played its home games in the Club Británico's multifunction park which was directly in front of its headquarters.

The club sometimes traded players with the Reforma Athletic Club a day before a match in order to fill each club's rosters. Clifford had been involved in the establishment of the Reforma Athletic Club football team in 1902. The two clubs were linked in this way because both had British roots.

The team wore uniforms and maintained a position that sport and aesthetics were compatible with sportsmanship. During half-time, the teams drank tea at tables located at the sidelines, which were attended by women.

=== 1907–1908 ===
In the 1907–08 tournament, Puebla A.C. withdrew from the Primera Fuerza due to the long distances they would have had to travel, and defending champions Reforma AC were ranked last, failing to win any games. It was the first Mexican championship title for British Football Club (Mexico City), whose players were almost exclusively British. The player-trainer Percy Clifford, centre half-back "Jack" Caldwall and the Hogg brothers were the most prominent characters.

British

- (United Kingdom) John Easton
- (United Kingdom) Alexander Dewar
- (United Kingdom) Pierce Mennill
- (United Kingdom) Percy Clifford
- (United Kingdom) Bryan White
- (United Kingdom) John Johnson

British

- (United Kingdom) John Hogg
- (United Kingdom) Douglas Watson
- (United Kingdom) Stephen Crowder
- (United Kingdom) George Ratcliff
- (United Kingdom) John Caldwall
- (United Kingdom) Horace Hogg

== Early seasons ==
Before the league began, British Club played exhibition matches against Reforma Athletic Club in 1901 and early 1902. The first, on 2 June 1901 at Reforma's ground in Mexico City, ended in a 2–0 win for Reforma, and the two clubs met three more times in December 1901 and January 1902, with British winning one of them, 3–1 on 5 January 1902. The success of those matches led to a match between the best players of the two clubs, played as England against Scotland on 9 February 1902, which England won 3–2.

On 19 July 1902 the Mexico Association Foot-ball League was organised, the first football league in Mexico, with five clubs: Pachuca, Orizaba, Reforma, British and Mexico Cricket Club, playing a round-robin in which the team with the most points was champion. British began the inaugural season on 19 October 1902 with a 5–1 win at Mexico Cricket Club, with James C. McNab and Edgar Jones scoring twice each, and finished third, with two wins, no draws and two defeats in four matches, scoring seven goals and conceding three.

In 1903–04 British again finished third, this time with one win, one draw and three defeats in five matches, scoring only one goal. The following season they finished as runners-up, level on 12 points with champions Pachuca, who took the title on goal average after both clubs won six of their eight matches. British scored 14 goals and conceded nine in that season, and in 1905–06 they fell to fourth of five clubs, with two wins and six defeats in eight matches.

== Championship season and decline ==
British finished second again in 1906–07, with five wins, one draw and two defeats in eight matches, including a 2–1 win away to Reforma on 7 October 1906 and a match against Pachuca awarded to British after Pachuca failed to appear. The next season brought the club's only league title: British were unbeaten in 1907–08, winning four and drawing two of six matches, scoring ten goals and conceding three, to finish ahead of Mexico FC, while defending champions Reforma finished last without a win.

The title defence collapsed the following season. With only three clubs in the league, British finished last in 1908–09, with no wins, one draw and three defeats in four matches, scoring one goal and conceding nine. Their only point came in a 0–0 draw with Reforma on 20 December 1908, and they also lost 6–1 to Pachuca on 8 December 1908.

== Later years, merger and withdrawal ==
In 1909–10 British finished third, with one win, two draws and three defeats in six matches, although two of the defeats were matches awarded to their opponents after British failed to appear, against Popo FC and Pachuca. At the end of that season Popo Park FC and British Club merged into a combined team called British-Popo.

As British-Popo, the club finished third again in 1910–11, with two wins, one draw and three defeats in six matches, including a 2–0 win over Club México and a 2–7 defeat by Pachuca. In 1911–12 the club withdrew from the league without playing a match, after failing to appear for its first two fixtures, and its remaining matches were cancelled. It was dissolved in 1912 and did not enter the 1912–13 league. Rovers FC entered the league that season, and former British players Harold Payne and Oswald Sharp scored in Rovers' opening 3–0 win over España on 6 October 1912.

== Copa Tower ==
The Copa Tower, the first cup competition in Mexico, was organised in 1908, with its trophy donated by the British ambassador in Mexico, Reginald Tower, who had arrived in the country in 1907. British reached the first final in 1907–08 but lost 1–0 to Pachuca. In 1908–09 they lost 3–2 to Reforma in the semi-final on 17 January 1909. As British-Popo, they won the cup in 1910–11, beating Reforma 3–0 in the final, after beating Club México 5–0 in an earlier round.

== Players and goalscorers ==
Percy Clifford was the league's leading scorer in two seasons, with five goals in eight matches in both 1904–05 and 1906–07, and John Hogg led the league in the championship season of 1907–08, with four goals in six matches. Clifford, who played as player-trainer, centre half-back John "Jack" Caldwall and the Hogg brothers were the most prominent players of the title-winning side, and James F. McNabb was among the club's goalscorers in its later seasons, scoring in the 1–1 draw with Popo FC on 24 October 1909 and in the 3–0 win over Pachuca on 8 December 1909.

=== League record ===
The club's league record, as compiled by RSSSF, was as follows:

League record
Season	Pos	P	W	D	L	GF	GA	Pts
1902–03	3rd	4	2	0	2	7	3	4
1903–04	3rd	5	1	1	3	1	4	3
1904–05	2nd	8	6	0	2	14	9	12
1905–06	4th	8	2	0	6	7	13	4
1906–07	2nd	8	5	1	2	8	10	11
1907–08	1st	6	4	2	0	10	3	10
1908–09	3rd	4	0	1	3	1	9	1
1909–10	3rd	6	1	2	3	8	10	4
1910–11	3rd	6	2	1	3	8	14	5
1911–12	—	0	0	0	0	0	0	0

RSSSF lists the club as British FC in some seasons and as British Club in others; the 1910–11 entry was the merged British-Popo side, and the 1911–12 entry is shown as a withdrawal, with no matches played.

== Honours ==
=== Amateur ===
- Liga Mexicana de Football Amateur Association: 1907–08
- Copa Tower: 1910–11

== Top Scorers ==
- 1904–05 (England) Percy Clifford (5 Goals / 8 games)
- 1906–07 (England) Percy Clifford (5 Goals / 8 games)
- 1907–08 (England) John Hogg (4 Goals / 6 games)
- 1911–12 (England) John Hogg (3 Goals / 4 games)

== See also ==
- Football in Mexico
