= Reforma AC =

Reforma
- Full name: Reforma Athletic Club
- Nicknames: Los Caimanes (The Alligators); Los Lagartos (The Lizards); Los Reformistas (The Reformists)
- Short name: REF, RAC
- Founded: 1894; 132 years ago
- Dissolved: 1915; 111 years ago (the football club)
- Ground: Club Reforma; Mexico City
- Capacity: 20 000
- League: Liga Interclubes de Fútbol Soccer Amateur de la Ciudad de México
- Website: http://www.clubreforma.com.mx
Home colours

Reforma Athletic Club is a Mexican sports club located in Mexico City. The club is mostly known for its football team that played in the Liga Mexicana de Football Amateur Association from 1902 to 1915, prior to the creation of the first professional league (Liga Mayor). The team currently plays in an amateur league in Mexico City.

Apart from football, Reforma also hosts a large number of activities, including aerobics, ballet, baseball, basketball, boxing, dance, gymnastics, karate, racquetball, swimming, tennis, water aerobics, yoga and zumba. It is a home ground of the Mexican national cricket team, and has been the host of several international fixtures.

== History ==
The club was founded in 1894 by a group of English migrants in order to play sport and as a social club. The members would practice cricket, among other sports, and it became a tradition to drink tea every afternoon at 5 o'clock.

In 1901, the players included James Walker, A.J. Campbell, T.R. Phillips, A.T. Drysdale, F. Robertson and E.W Jackson. They played friendly matches against local Scottish and English clubs representing their countries of origin.

In 1902, the club first participated in a football competition in the Liga Mexicana Amateur de Asociación Foot-Ball in Mexico City. The clubs taking part were Albinegros de Orizaba, Pachuca, Reforma Athletic Club, Mexico Cricket Club and British Club. This was the first organized football tournament in Mexico.

Before the first match in the new league took place, the club played numerous friendlies against Pachuca in order to unite the English migrants living around Mexico. The club played its first game in the league on October 19, 1902 against the eventual champions Albinegros de Orizaba in Orizaba, Veracruz with a score of 2–0.

In 1906, Reforma Athletic Club won the league for the first time. It did so again in 1907, 1909, 1910, 1911 and 1912.

In 1914, the club suffered a big blow when almost all of its players returned to Europe in order to take part in World War I. Most of its players were British and had decided to fight for their homeland.

In 1920 the club was revived, this time with more Mexican players, people who had been born in Mexico but had English parents, along with players returning from the war.

The club played its last league match on July 6, 1924 losing 1-0 to Club de Fútbol Aurrerá.

The club was revived again in 1948 as a founder member of the Liga interclubes de fútbol soccer Amateur along with the clubs Tecaya, Canarios, Deportivo Chapultepec, Tiburones, Titingo, Osos and Lusitania. The club still participates in this league.

=== 1905-06 ===
In the 1905/06 season, Reforma Athletic Club won the Mexican championship, the first club from the capital to do so. The club was dominated by British players but did also allow native players. It was remarkable that in 20 league matches, there were 16 games where one or both sides failed to score. Champions Reforma had two excellent full-backs in the brothers Robert and Charles Blackmore, while most of their goals were not scored by a forward but by right half-back Charles Butlin. Mexico Cricket Club, which had changed its name to San Pedro Golf Club, were runners-up.

England

- (England) Thomas R. Phillips (C)
- (England) Morton S. Turner
- (England) Robert J. Blackmore
- (England) Charles Blackmore
- (England) Charles M. Butlin
- (England) Ebenezer Johnson
- (England) Charles D. Gibson
- (England) Robert Locke
- (England) Thomas R. Phillips
- (England) Paul M. Bennett
- (England) Thomas R. Phillips (Trainer)

Mexico

- (Mexico) Julio Lacaud
- (Mexico) Vicente Etchegaray

France

- (France) Edward Bourchier

=== 1908-09 ===
The Mexican championship was going through a critical period. Only three teams had entered the 1908/09 season, at the end of which Reforma Athletic Club (Mexico City) won for the third time after 1906 and 1907. Only eight players remained of the 1907 team, except for the three forwards Vicente Etchegaray', Jorge Parada and Julio Lacaud, the other players all came from Europe, mostly Great Britain.

England

- (England) Thomas R. Phillips (C)
- (England) Morton S. Turner
- (England) Robert J. Blackmore
- (England) Charles M. Butlin
- (England) John Ratckling
- (England) Joseph T. Bennett
- (England) Robert Locke
- (England) Sylvester J. Patton
- (England) Paul M. Bennett
- (England) Charles Blackmore
- (England) Charles D. Gibson
- (England) Thomas R. Phillips (Trainer)

Mexico

- (Mexico) Julio Lacaud
- (Mexico) Jorge Parada
- (Mexico) Vicente Etchegaray

France

- (France) Edward Bourchier

== Honours ==
=== Amateur ===
- Liga Mexicana de Football Amateur Association: 1905–06, 1906–07, 1908–09, 1909–10, 1910–11, 1911–12
- Copa Tower: 1908–09, 1909–10

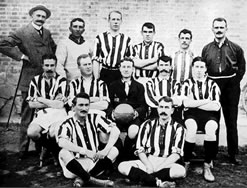
Oldest picture of the club in 1901

== Topscorers ==
- 1903-04 (Mexico) Julio Lacaud (4 Goals / 8 games)
- 1905-06 (France) Claude M. Butlin (6 Goals / 8 games)
- 1908-09 (Mexico) Jorge Gómez de Parada (3 Goals / 4 games)
- 1909-10 (England) Robert Blackmore (4 Goals / 6 games)
- 1910-11 (France) Claude M. Butlin (2 Goals / 4 games)

== See also ==
- Football in Mexico
