= List of Toluca FC seasons =

This is a list of the seasons played by Toluca FC from 1950 when the club became a professional football club. Before 1950, and from 1917, when Deportivo Toluca was founded, the club participated in several amateur competitions. Top scorers in bold were also top scorers of Liga MX.

Toluca has won the first division title twelve times, the Copa MX twice, the Campeón de Campeones five times, the Segunda División de México once and the CONCACAF Champions' Cup twice.

== Professional era (league system) (1950–1970) ==
Season	League										Cup	International	Result	League top goalscorer	
Season	Division	P	W	D	L	GF	GA	GD	Pts	Pos	Cup	International	Result	Player	Goals
1950–51	Segunda División	12	3	3	6	17	19	–2	9	6th	DNP	–			
1951–52	Segunda División	18	8	5	5	44	34	+10	21	3rd	DNP	–			
1952–53	Segunda División	22	14	7	1	63	28	+35	35	1st	DNP	–			
1953–54	Primera División	22	8	7	7	35	34	+1	23	5th	GS	–		(Mexico) Carús	11
1954–55	Primera División	22	9	5	8	35	30	+5	23	6th	R1	–		(Mexico) Blanco	10
1955–56	Primera División	26	11	9	6	49	31	+18	31	4th	W	–		(Mexico) Blanco	9
1956–57	Primera División	24	11	8	5	45	20	+25	30	2nd	QF	–		(Uruguay) Palleiro	15
1957–58	Primera División	26	14	6	6	60	29	+31	34	2nd	QF	–			
1958–59	Primera División	26	10	8	8	41	37	+4	28	6th	SF	–			
1959–60	Primera División	26	12	6	8	51	36	+15	30	5th	SF	–			
1960–61	Primera División	26	8	8	10	41	37	+4	24	9th	RU	–			
1961–62	Primera División	26	15	4	7	58	37	+21	34	3rd	GS	–			
1962–63	Primera División	26	8	10	8	32	31	+1	26	7th	R1	–			
1963–64	Primera División	26	6	10	10	31	35	–4	22	11th	SF	–			
1964–65	Primera División	30	8	11	11	31	34	–3	27	11th	GS	–			
1965–66	Primera División	30	7	12	11	39	37	+2	26	12th	SF	–			
1966–67	Primera División	30	17	7	6	48	24	+24	41	1st	SF	–		(Brazil) **Epaminondas**	21
1967–68	Primera División	30	18	8	4	56	28	+28	44	1st	SF	–			
1968–69	Primera División	30	13	8	9	43	30	+13	34	3rd	QF	CONCACAF Champions' Cup	W		
1969–70	Primera División	30	13	7	10	46	35	+9	33	4th	R16	CONCACAF Champions' Cup	R2	(Mexico) **Pereda**	20

== Liguilla system (1970–1996) ==
Season	League											Cup	International	Result	League top goalscorer	
Season	Division	P	W	D	L	GF	GA	GD	Pts	Rank	Liguilla	Cup	International	Result	Player	Goals
1970	Primera División	14	7	3	4	21	12	+9	17	1st	4th	–	–		(Mexico) Romero Reyes	8
1970–71	Primera División	34	14	15	5	38	21	+17	43	2nd	RU	R16	–		(Mexico) Romero Reyes	12
1971–72	Primera División	34	11	9	14	46	51	–5	31	14th	DNQ	GS	CONCACAF; Champions' Cup	R2	(Mexico) Pereda	11
1972–73	Primera División	34	13	13	8	51	39	+12	39	5th	DNQ	Not held	–		(Mexico) Pereda	10
1973–74	Primera División	34	14	11	9	54	43	+10	39	5th	DNQ	GS	–		(Mexico) Medina	9
1974–75	Primera División	38	19	12	7	54	32	+22	50	2nd	W	GS	–		(Ecuador) Estupiñán	18
1975–76	Primera División	38	12	12	14	43	44	–1	36	11th	DNQ	GS	–		(Ecuador) Estupiñán	14
1976–77	Primera División	38	12	12	14	43	44	–1	36	11th	DNQ	Not held	–		(Uruguay) Eugui	6
1977–78	Primera División	38	20	7	11	55	37	+18	47	3rd	QF	Not held	–		(Mexico) Ruiz Monroy	12
1978–79	Primera División	38	19	7	12	59	43	+16	45	4th	SF	Not held	–		(Uruguay) Brandón	18
1979–80	Primera División	38	14	11	13	44	45	–1	39	9th	DNQ	Not held	–		(Uruguay) Brandón	11
1980–81	Primera División	38	14	12	12	47	41	+6	40	9th	SF	Not held	–		(Bolivia) Reynaldo	10
1981–82	Primera División	38	12	14	12	53	57	–4	38	13th	DNQ	Not held	–		(Mexico) Manzo	13
1982–83	Primera División	38	17	10	11	62	43	+19	44	4th	QF	Not held	–		(Mexico) Manzo	17
1983–84	Primera División	38	14	10	14	57	56	+1	38	8th	DNQ	Not held	–		(Mexico) Manzo	16
1984–85	Primera División	38	8	14	16	34	53	–19	30	17th	DNQ	Not held	–		(Mexico) Hernández	8
1985–86 (Note: For the 1985–86, the season was split into two tournaments: Prode 85 and México 86.)	Primera División	8	3	2	3	8	12	–4	8	10th	DNQ	Not held	–		(Mexico) H. Rodríguez	4
1985–86	Primera División	18	5	4	9	19	32	–13	14	17th	DNQ	Not held	–		(Mexico) Hernández	4
1986–87	Primera División	40	7	23	10	35	41	–6	37	13th	DNQ	Not held	–		(Mexico) Gama	13
1987–88	Primera División	38	16	7	15	49	50	–1	39	9th	QF	SF	–		(Brazil) Ferretti	22
1988–89	Primera División	38	11	10	17	58	67	–9	32	15th	DNQ	W	–		(Brazil) Ferretti	14
1989–90	Primera División	38	11	16	11	42	33	+9	38	10th	QF	R16	–		(Uruguay) Olivera	9
1990–91	Primera División	38	12	14	12	53	50	+3	38	11th	DNQ	GS	–		(Argentina) Pizzi	12
1991–92	Primera División	38	13	12	13	47	49	–2	38	12th	DNQ	GS	–		(Argentina) Depietri	9
1992–93	Primera División	38	9	14	15	49	50	–1	32	14th	DNQ	Not held	–		(Mexico) J. Rodríguez	13
1993–94	Primera División	38	18	10	10	54	32	+22	46	3rd	SF	Not held	–		(Brazil) Nildeson	12
1994–95	Primera División	36	10	8	18	44	57	–13	28	16th	DNQ	R1	–		(Mexico) Bernal	8
1995–96	Primera División	34	10	7	17	33	45	–12	37	15th	DNQ	R1	–		(Uruguay) Morales	9

== Short tournaments (1996–present) ==
Season	Tournament	League											Cup	International	Result	League top goalscorer	
Season	Tournament	Division	P	W	D	L	GF	GA	GD	Pts	Rank	Liguilla	Cup	International	Result	Player	Goals
1996–97	Invierno 1996	Primera División	17	9	3	5	26	15	+11	30	5th	QF	GS	–		(Paraguay) Cardozo	7
1996–97	Verano 1997	Primera División	17	5	6	6	26	21	+5	21	11th	DNQ	GS	–		(Uruguay) Morales	5
1997–98	Invierno 1997	Primera División	17	5	4	8	21	21	0	19	12th	DNQ	Not held	–		(Paraguay) Cardozo	7
1997–98	Verano 1998	Primera División	17	10	3	4	39	25	+14	33	1st	W	Not held	–		(Paraguay) **Cardozo**	18
1998–99	Invierno 1998	Primera División	17	10	6	1	39	14	+25	36	2nd	QF	Not held	CONCACAF; Champions' Cup	RU	(Paraguay) Cardozo	13
1998–99	Verano 1999	Primera División	17	12	3	2	50	23	+27	39	1st	W	Not held	CONCACAF; Champions' Cup	RU	(Paraguay) **Cardozo**	20
1999–00	Invierno 1999	Primera División	17	9	5	3	40	25	+15	32	2nd	QF	Not held	CONCACAF; Champions' Cup	QF	(Uruguay) Morales	10
1999–00	Verano 2000	Primera División	17	13	1	3	44	28	+16	40	1st	W	Not held	CONCACAF; Champions' Cup	QF	(Paraguay) Cardozo	20
2000–01	Invierno 2000	Primera División	17	9	3	5	32	26	+6	30	2nd	RU	Not held	CONCACAF; Champions' Cup	QF	(Paraguay) Cardozo	11
2000–01	Verano 2001	Primera División	17	3	8	6	28	33	–5	17	17th	DNQ	Not held	CONCACAF; Champions' Cup	QF	(Paraguay) Cardozo	11
2001–02	Invierno 2001	Primera División	18	8	8	2	33	22	+11	32	2nd	SF	Not held	–		(Uruguay) Sánchez	10
2001–02	Verano 2002	Primera División	18	10	5	3	35	17	+18	35	2nd	QF	Not held	–		(Paraguay) Cardozo	14
2002–03	Apertura 2002	Primera División	19	12	5	2	55	25	+30	41	2nd	W	Not held	–		(Paraguay) **Cardozo**	36
2002–03	Clausura 2003	Primera División	19	10	3	6	40	30	+10	33	5th	QF	Not held	–		(Paraguay) **Cardozo**	22
2003–04	Apertura 2003	Primera División	19	8	3	8	33	24	+9	27	10th	SF	Not held	CONCACAF; Champions' Cup	W	(Paraguay) Cardozo	18
2003–04	Clausura 2004	Primera División	19	8	6	5	31	25	+16	30	5th	SF	Not held	CONCACAF; Champions' Cup	W	(Paraguay) Cardozo	11
2004–05	Apertura 2004	Primera División	17	10	2	5	27	15	+12	32	2nd	QF	Not held	–		(Paraguay) Cardozo	14
2004–05	Clausura 2005	Primera División	17	6	5	6	17	22	–5	23	11th	DNQ	Not held	–		(Paraguay) Cardozo	5
2005–06	Apertura 2005	Primera División	17	9	3	5	27	21	+6	30	5th	W	Not held	CONCACAF; Champions' Cup	RU	(Uruguay) Sánchez	6
2005–06	Clausura 2006	Primera División	17	7	3	7	22	19	+3	24	6th	SF	Not held	CONCACAF; Champions' Cup	RU	(Mexico) López	6
2006–07	Apertura 2006	Primera División	17	7	6	4	27	16	+11	27	4th	RU	Not held	Copa Libertadores	R16	(Argentina) **Marioni**	15
2006–07	Clausura 2007	Primera División	17	3	10	4	15	17	–2	19	13th	DNQ	Not held	Copa Libertadores	R16	(Uruguay) Sánchez	5
2007–08	Apertura 2007	Primera División	17	10	4	3	27	16	+11	34	2nd	QF	Not held	–		(Uruguay) Sánchez	9
2007–08	Clausura 2008	Primera División	17	7	6	4	23	19	+4	27	5th	QF	Not held	–		(Mexico) Ponce	4
2008–09	Apertura 2008	Primera División	17	7	6	4	25	16	+9	27	2nd	W	Not held	–		(Chile) **Mancilla**	13
2008–09	Clausura 2009	Primera División	17	10	6	1	34	19	+15	36	2nd	QF	Not held	–		(Chile) **Mancilla**	14
2009–10	Apertura 2009	Primera División	17	11	2	4	32	19	+13	35	1st	SF	Not held	CONCACAF; Champions League	SF	(Chile) Mancilla	12
2009–10	Bicentenario 2010	Primera División	17	8	6	3	27	15	+12	30	3rd	W	Not held	CONCACAF; Champions League	SF	(Chile) Mancilla	8
2010–11	Apertura 2010	Primera División	17	5	7	5	18	20	–2	22	11th	DNQ	Not held	CONCACAF; Champions League	QF	(Chile) Mancilla	5
2010–11	Clausura 2011	Primera División	17	5	6	6	28	27	+1	21	12th	DNQ	Not held	CONCACAF; Champions League	QF	(Ecuador) Ayoví	5
2011–12	Apertura 2011	Primera División	17	4	8	5	19	27	–8	20	13th	DNQ	Not held	–		(Uruguay) **Alonso**	11
2011–12	Clausura 2012	Primera División	17	6	4	7	24	27	–3	22	11th	DNQ	Not held	–		(Uruguay) **Alonso**	14
2012–13	Apertura 2012	Liga MX	17	10	4	3	28	17	+11	34	1st	RU	QF	Copa Libertadores	GS	(Panama) Tejada	6
2012–13	Clausura 2013	Liga MX	17	5	3	9	14	21	–7	18	13th	DNQ	DNP	Copa Libertadores	GS	(Brazil) Silva	5
2013–14	Apertura 2013	Liga MX	17	6	9	2	33	17	+16	27	5th	SF	DNP	CONCACAF; Champions League	RU	(Paraguay) **Velázquez**	12
2013–14	Clausura 2014	Liga MX	17	5	3	9	14	21	–7	18	13th	SF	DNP	CONCACAF; Champions League	RU	(Paraguay) Velázquez	7
2014–15	Apertura 2014	Liga MX	17	8	5	4	24	18	+6	29	4th	SF	QF	–		(Paraguay) Velázquez	8
2014–15	Clausura 2015	Liga MX	17	6	6	5	20	18	+2	24	10th	DNQ	GS	–		(Paraguay) Benítez	4
2015–16	Apertura 2015	Liga MX	17	10	2	5	33	24	+9	32	2nd	SF	SF	Copa Libertadores	R16	(Argentina) Triverio	10
2015–16	Clausura 2016	Liga MX	17	5	7	5	20	21	–1	22	11th	DNQ	DNP	Copa Libertadores	R16	(Argentina) Triverio	6
2016–17	Apertura 2016	Liga MX	17	6	6	5	22	21	+1	24	10th	DNQ	SF	–		(Colombia) Uribe	7
2016–17	Clausura 2017	Liga MX	17	8	3	6	21	20	+1	27	4th	SF	R16	–		(Colombia) Uribe	8
2017–18	Apertura 2017	Liga MX	17	8	5	4	24	21	+3	29	5th	QF	R16	–		(Colombia) Uribe	8
2017–18	Clausura 2018	Liga MX	17	11	3	3	24	13	+11	36	1st	RU	RU	–		(Colombia) Uribe	9
2018–19	Apertura 2018	Liga MX	17	8	2	7	27	22	+5	26	7th	QF	GS	CONCACAF; Champions League	R16	(Mexico) Vega	6
2018–19	Clausura 2019	Liga MX	17	7	4	6	28	23	+5	25	9th	DNQ	DNP	CONCACAF; Champions League	R16	(Argentina) Canelo	6
2019–20	Apertura 2019	Liga MX	18	4	5	9	16	26	–10	17	17th	DNQ	SF	–		(Argentina) Gigliotti	4
2019–20	Clausura 2020	Liga MX	10	2	4	4	16	18	–2	10	15th	Not held (Note: The Clausura 2020 tournament was suspended due to the COVID-19 pandemic.)	SF	–		(Uruguay) Fernández	8
2020–21	Apertura 2020	Liga MX	17	6	3	8	23	28	–5	21	11th	RE	Not held	–		(Argentina) Canelo	6
2020–21	Clausura 2021	Liga MX	17	6	4	7	26	24	+2	22	11th	QF	Not held	–		(Argentina) **Canelo**	11
2021–22	Apertura 2021	Liga MX	17	6	6	5	22	22	0	24	6th	RE	Not held	–		(Argentina) Canelo (Argentina) Sambueza	4
2021–22	Clausura 2022	Liga MX	17	5	4	8	21	36	–15	19	15th	DNQ	Not held	–		(Uruguay) Fernández	7
2022–23	Apertura 2022	Liga MX	17	7	6	4	27	23	+4	27	6th	RU	Not held	–		(Chile) Meneses	7
2022–23	Clausura 2023	Liga MX	17	9	5	3	34	19	+15	32	4th	QF	Not held	–		(Brazil) Volpi (Paraguay) González	5
2023–24	Apertura 2023	Liga MX	17	5	6	6	23	19	+4	21	12th	DNQ	Not held	Leagues Cup	R16	(Mexico) Domínguez	4
2023–24	Clausura 2024	Liga MX	17	9	5	3	38	23	+15	32	3rd	QF	Not held	Leagues Cup	R16	(Mexico) Vega	6
2024–25	Apertura 2024	Liga MX	17	10	5	2	38	16	+22	35	2nd	SF	Not held	Leagues Cup	R16	(Portugal) **Paulinho**	13
2024–25	Clausura 2025	Liga MX	17	10	5	2	35	14	+21	35	3rd	W	Not held	CONCACAF; Champions Cup	R1	(Portugal) Paulinho	9
2025–26	Apertura 2025	Liga MX	17	11	4	2	43	18	+25	37	1st	W	Not held	Leagues Cup	R32	(Portugal) Paulinho	11
2025–26	Clausura 2026	Liga MX	17	8	5	4	29	20	+9	29	5th	QF	Not held	CONCACAF; Champions Cup	W	(Mexico) Angulo	6
