= 1964–65 Cruz Azul season =

Cruz Azul
1964–65 season
- Chairman: Guillermo Álvarez Macías
- Manager: Jorge Marik
- Stadium: Estadio 10 de Diciembre
- Primera División: 8th
- Copa México: Semi-finals
- Top goalscorer: League: Guadalupe Díaz (11); All: Guadalupe Díaz (12)
- Biggest win: Cruz Azul 4–1 Nacional (16 August 1964)
- Biggest defeat: Monterrey 4–1 Cruz Azul (6 June 1964)
Home colours

The 1964–65 season was Club Deportivo Cruz Azul's 38th season in existence, the fifth season in the football club's history as a professional team and the first season in the top flight of Mexican football.

The team competed in the Primera División and Copa México. Cruz Azul made his Primera División debut on 6 June 1964 against Monterrey. The club was managed by Hungarian Jorge Marik in his fourth season with the team.

== Coaching staff ==
Position	Name
Head coach	(Hungary) Jorge Marik
Assistant coach	(Mexico) Francisco González Gatica

== Competitions ==
=== Overview ===
Competition	First match	Last match	Starting round	Final position	Record							
Competition	First match	Last match	Starting round	Final position	Pld	W	D	L	GF	GA	GD	Win %
Primera División	6 June 1964	27 December 1964	Matchday 1	8th	30	10	9	11	45	42	+3	33.33
Copa México	10 January 1965	28 February 1965	Group stage	Semifinals	8	3	3	2	10	9	+1	37.50
Total					38	13	12	13	55	51	+4	34.21

Source: RSSSF

=== Primera División ===
==== Result round by round ====
Round	1	2	3	4	5	6	7	8	9	10	11	12	13	14	15	16	17	18	19	20	21	22	23	24	25	26	27	28	29	30
Ground	A	H	A	H	A	H	A	H	H	A	H	A	H	A	H	H	A	H	A	H	A	H	A	A	H	A	H	A	H	A
Result	L	D	W	W	W	W	L	L	L	D	W	D	L	W	W	L	D	W	L	W	W	D	L	L	D	L	L	D	D	D
Position	12	13	11	7	5	3	6	11	11	11	8	7	10	7	5	9	6	5	6	5	3	3	4	6	6	8	8	9	9	8

A = Away; H = Home; W = Win; D = Draw; L = Loss

==== Matches ====
6 June 1964 1	Monterrey	4–1	Cruz Azul	Monterrey
				Stadium: Estadio Tecnológico

14 June 1964 2	Cruz Azul	1–1	Toluca	Jasso
	Arellano 52'		Morales 29'	Stadium: Estadio 10 de Diciembre; Referee: Rafael Valenzuela

21 June 1964 3	Oro	2–3	Cruz Azul	Guadalajara
	Flores 6'; Rodríguez 25'		G. Díaz 35', 59'; H. Díaz 36'	Stadium: Estadio Jalisco; Referee: Felipe Buergo

28 June 1964 4	Cruz Azul	2–1	UNAM	Jasso
				Stadium: Estadio 10 de Diciembre

4 July 1964 5	Necaxa	0–3	Cruz Azul	Mexico City
			Arellano 5'; Bustos 41'; H. Díaz 54'	Stadium: Estadio Olímpico Universitario

12 July 1964 6	Cruz Azul	3–0	Irapuato	Jasso
	H. Díaz 5'; Herrera 52'; Arellano 60'			Stadium: Estadio 10 de Diciembre; Referee: Javier Galindo

19 July 1964 7	Zacatepec	3–2	Cruz Azul	Zacatepec
	Silva 9'; Lara 73'; Cisneros 78'		Arellano 30'; Herrera 63'	Stadium: Parque del Ingenio; Referee: Diego De Leo

26 July 1964 8	Cruz Azul	2–4	Guadalajara	Jasso
	Bustos 19'; Arellano 77'		Valdivia 29'; Jara 29'; Reyes 61'; Barba 70'	Stadium: Estadio 10 de Diciembre; Referee: Felipe Buergo

2 August 1964 9	Cruz Azul	2–3	Veracruz	Jasso
	Muciño 12'; Pulido 75'		Álvarez 22', 79'; Aussin 49'	Stadium: Estadio 10 de Diciembre; Attendance: 10,000; Referee: Rafael Valenzuela

6 August 1964 10	Atlas	1–1	Cruz Azul	Guadalajara
	Ney 24' (pen.)		G. Díaz 43' (pen.)	Stadium: Estadio Jalisco; Referee: Ricardo Basurto

16 August 1964 11	Cruz Azul	4–1	Nacional	Jasso
	G. Díaz ?', 52'; Pulido 64', 69'		Buenrostro 15'	Stadium: Estadio 10 de Diciembre

23 August 1964 12	Atlante	1–1	Cruz Azul	Mexico City
	Evaristo 24'		G. Díaz 56'	Stadium: Estadio Olímpico Universitario; Referee: Diego De Leo

30 August 1964 13	Cruz Azul	1–2	América	Jasso
	H. Díaz 10'		Ulibarri 5' (o.g.); Portugal ?' (pen.)	Stadium: Estadio 10 de Diciembre

6 September 1964 14	León	0–3	Cruz Azul	León
			H. Díaz 14'; G. Díaz 28'; Bustos 80'	Stadium: Estadio La Martinica

13 September 1964 15	Cruz Azul	1–0	Morelia	Jasso
	G. Díaz 51' (pen.)			Stadium: Estadio 10 de Diciembre; Referee: Diego Di Leo

20 September 1964 16	Cruz Azul	0–3	Monterrey	Jasso
			Rubini 26', 43'; Vevé 34'	Stadium: Estadio 10 de Diciembre

27 September 1964 17	Toluca	0–0	Cruz Azul	Toluca
				Stadium: Estadio Luis Gutiérrez Dosal

4 October 1964 18	Cruz Azul	1–0	Oro	Jasso
	Pulido 85'			Stadium: Estadio 10 de Diciembre

8 October 1964 19	UNAM	2–1	Cruz Azul	Mexico City
	Juracy 20'; Carlito 89'		G. Díaz 65'	Stadium: Estadio Olímpico Universitario

18 October 1964 20	Cruz Azul	3–1	Necaxa	Jasso
	H. Díaz 55'; Herrera 56', 88'		Velarde ?'	Stadium: Estadio 10 de Diciembre

25 October 1964 21	Irapuato	1–2	Cruz Azul	Irapuato
	Martínez 40'		Bustos 32', 60'	Stadium: Estadio Revolución; Attendance: 10,000; Referee: Ricardo Bustos

1 November 1964 22	Cruz Azul	1–1	Zacatepec	Jasso
	G. Díaz 45'		Reyes 5'	Stadium: Estadio 10 de Diciembre; Referee: Felipe Buergo

8 November 1964 23	Guadalajara	3–2	Cruz Azul	Guadalajara
	Reyes 14', 70'; Hernández 69'		Herrera 20'; Bustos 42'	Stadium: Estadio Jalisco; Referee: Rafael Valenzuela

15 November 1964 24	Veracruz	1–0	Cruz Azul	Veracruz
	Hernández 49'			Stadium: Parque Deportivo Veracruzano; Referee: Diego De Leo

22 November 1964 25	Cruz Azul	1–1	Atlas	Jasso
	Arellano 21' (pen.)		del Muro 10' (pen.)	Stadium: Estadio 10 de Diciembre; Referee: Basurto

29 November 1964 26	Nacional	2–1	Cruz Azul	Guadalajara
	González 28'; Alejándrez 77'		G. Díaz 14'	Stadium: Estadio Jalisco; Referee: Rafael Valenzuela

6 December 1964 27	Cruz Azul	1–2	Atlante	Jasso
	Vargas 42'		Evaristo 37'; Boggio 75'	Stadium: Estadio 10 de Diciembre

10 December 1964 28	América	1–1	Cruz Azul	Mexico City
	Fragoso 39'		G. Díaz 35'	Stadium: Estadio Olímpico Universitario; Referee: Abel Aguilar

20 December 1964 29	Cruz Azul	0–0	León	Jasso
				Stadium: Estadio 10 de Diciembre

27 December 1964 30	Morelia	1–1	Cruz Azul	Morelia
	Franco 24'		H. Díaz 89'	Stadium: Campo Independiente; Referee: Javier Galindo

=== Copa México ===
==== Group stage ====
Team	Pld	W	D	L	GF	GA	GD	Pts
Cruz Azul	6	3	2	1	8	6	+2	8
Necaxa	6	2	2	2	6	7	−1	6
Veracruz	6	1	3	2	7	6	+1	5
Atlante	6	2	1	3	6	8	−2	5

Source: RSSSF

10 January 1965 1	Cruz Azul	1–2	Necaxa	Jasso
	H. Díaz 54'		Baeza 26'; Pérez 35' (o.g.)	Stadium: Estadio 10 de Diciembre; Referee: Diego Di Leo

17 January 1965 2	Atlante	0–1	Cruz Azul	Mexico City
			Arellano 8'	Stadium: Estadio Olímpico Universitario

24 January 1965 3	Veracruz	1–1	Cruz Azul	Veracruz
	Linazza 1'		Bustos 42'	Stadium: Parque Deportivo Veracruzano; Referee: Fernando Buergo

28 January 1965 4	Necaxa	0–0	Cruz Azul	Mexico City
				Stadium: Estadio Olímpico Universitario; Referee: Javier Galindo

7 February 1965 5	Cruz Azul	3–2	Atlante	Jasso
	G. Díaz 49'; Muciño 54'; Bustos 71'		Echeveste 70'; Escalante 75'	Stadium: Estadio 10 de Diciembre

14 February 1965 6	Cruz Azul	2–1	Veracruz	Jasso
	Muciño ?'; Arellano 81'		Hernández 75'	Stadium: Estadio 10 de Diciembre

==== Semifinals ====
21 February 1965 First leg	Cruz Azul	0–1	América	Jasso
			Zague 4'	Stadium: Estadio 10 de Diciembre

28 February 1965 First leg	América	2–2 (a.e.t.) (3–2 agg.)	Cruz Azul	Mexico City
	Arlindo 8'; Mendoza ?'		Arellano 52'; Guerrero ?'	Stadium: Estadio Olímpico Universitario

== Statistics ==
=== Goals ===
Rank	Player	Position	Primera División	Copa México	Total
1	(Mexico) Guadalupe Díaz	MF	11	1	12
2	(Mexico) Raúl Arellano	MF	7	3	10
2	(Mexico) Hilario Díaz	MF	9	1	10
4	(Mexico) Fernando Bustos	MF	6	2	8
5	(Mexico) Raúl Herrera	MF	6	0	6
6	(Mexico) Héctor Pulido	MF	4	0	4
7	(Mexico) Roberto Muciño	MF	1	2	3
8	(Mexico) José Luis Guerrero	MF	0	1	1
8	(Mexico) Vargas	MF	1	0	1
Total			45	10	55

=== Clean sheets ===
Rank	Player	Primera División	Copa México	Total
1	(Mexico) Jesús García	7	2	9

=== Own goals ===
Player	Against	Result	Date	Competition
(Mexico) Francisco Ulibarri	América	1–2 (H)	30 August 1964	Primera División
(Mexico) Jesús Pérez	Necaxa	1–2 (H)	10 January 1965	Copa México
