= Clásico Capitalino =

Prominent rivalry in Mexican football between América and Pumas

- Other names: Derbi de la Ciudad de Mexico (Mexico City derby)
- Location: Mexico City
- Teams: América; Pumas
- First meeting: 1 July 1962; Pumas 0–2 América; Liga MX
- Latest meeting: 21 March 2026; América 0-1 Pumas; Liga MX
- Next meeting: TBD

Statistics
- Most wins: América (59)
- Largest victory: América 6–1 Pumas; 9 December 2018; Liga MX Quarter-final

América	Pumas

El Clasico Capitalino (Capital derby), refers to football matches between América and Pumas, both from Mexico City. América play at the Estadio Azteca, while Pumas play at the Estadio Olímpico Universitario, with the two grounds separated by approximately 1.1 miles (1.8 km).

== Background ==
In México the match is often perceived as the representation of a struggle between two antagonistic powers and institutions: Club América has always been regarded as the club of the establishment and the wealthy. The fact that the club is owned by the multimedia mass media company Televisa has further intensified this image. Pumas, representing the Universidad Nacional Autónoma de México, identifies itself as the club of the intellectuals and middle-class.

Indeed, both are clubs with very contrasting identities and policy, Club Universidad Nacional was originally an amateur club of college students from the University's several schools and then developed into a professional team competing in the Mexican football league, the nickname Pumas "Cougars" was inspired by Roberto 'Tapatio' Mendez, who coached the team from 1946–64 and whose motivational speeches often compared his players to pumas. The nickname stayed with the public, and all the athletic teams representing the University have been called Pumas; Club América self-proclaimed Las Águilas "The Eagles" wanted to have a representation of an animal that would show pride and domination of its environment. However, they are also called Los millonetas, a derogatory reference or version of the word millionaire, started when businessman Emilio Azcarraga Milmo, owner of Telesistema Mexicano, bought América from Isaac Bessudo in 1959. Following the acquisition, Azcárraga told his players, "I do not know much about football, but I do know a lot about business, and this, gentlemen, will be a business". Azcarraga hired the successful president of the Club Zacatepec, Guillermo Cañedo de la Bárcena, and started to hire other notable national and foreigner figures, focusing on money, to form a powerful team, Universidad Nacional instead have employed "La cantera universitaria", a youth development system with football academies and farm teams to success through its history.

The rivalry is particularly fierce from Pumas's side: according to surveys the majority of their supporters consider América as their main rival, however, most of América's fans see it as an important match but deem the match against Chivas as more important.

== History and rivalry ==
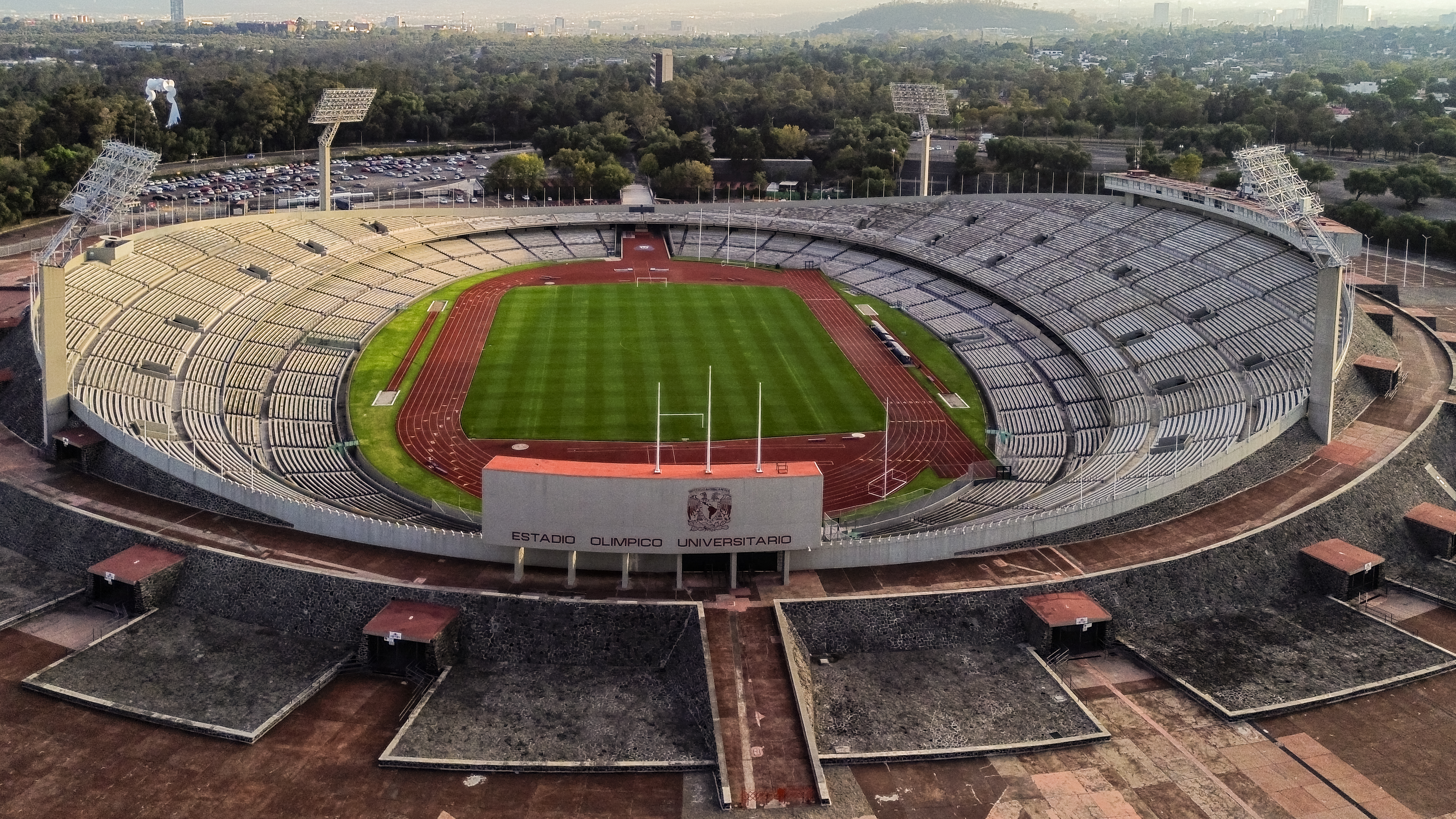
Estadio Olimpico Universitario, Home of Club Universidad Nacional

During the 1961–62 season in the Segunda División de México, Pumas were able to get promotion into top flight football, the Primera División de México. The first match for the team "benjamín" (newbie) of that season was América meeting on 1 July 1962 where América won 2–0 with goals by Francisco Moacyr and Antonio Jasso.

For the 1966–67 season, América, Atlante and Necaxa moved to a new stadium, the Estadio Azteca, and the first meeting between América and Pumas on 19 August 1966, América won 5–1. This defeat really hurt the pride of the fans "Universitarios" and playing at home on 1 December 1966, Pumas defeated América 4–1 in the Estadio Olímpico.

Years later, in the 1969–70 season, América were able to get international forward Enrique Borja, news which caused a lot of controversy and shocked the football world due to the strong rivalry between the teams. This transaction caused such an outrage that when the player found out of the transfer he opted not to play because he did not agree. However, the directors of the club were able to convince him and would play and later become an idol for América .

The rivalry increased with the years and came at a high point during the 1980s when these clubs disputed three finals during that decade. The first final was during the season 1984–85 which after 2 games tied, they had to play a third match on 28 May 1985 which caused great controversy of the performance of the referee Joaquín Urrea, the final score was 3–1 in favor of las Águilas with two goals by Daniel Brailovsky and one by Carlos Hermosillo, with this victory América was able to obtain their 5th title. They again met each other in the final during the season 1987–88 where once again América was victorious witch a favorable score of 4–1 during the second leg on 3 July 1988 and an aggregate score of 4–2. The last final disputed among the clubs was during the season 1990–91 in which Pumas was finally able to break its losing streak against América. The first game was won by América at home 3–2 on 19 July 1991 and the second leg on 22 July 1991 the game was decided by a free kick which was taken by Brazilian Ricardo "Tuca" Ferretti, this signified the third title in the history for the club "auriazul".

== Records ==
=== All-time goalscorers ===
Rank	Player	Club	Goals
1	(Mexico) Luís Roberto Alves	América	14
2	(Mexico) Jesús Olalde	Pumas	8
3	(Mexico) Manuel Negrete	Pumas	6
4	(Mexico) Alberto García Aspe	Pumas/América	5
4	(Brazil) (Mexico) Evanivaldo Castro	Pumas	5
4	(Brazil) (Mexico) Ricardo Ferretti	Pumas	5
4	(Mexico) Carlos Hermosillo	América	5
4	(Mexico) Luis García	Pumas/América	5
4	(Paraguay) (Mexico) Darío Verón	Pumas	5

=== All-time most appearances ===
Rank	Player	Club	Appearances	Years	Position
1	(Mexico) Sergio Bernal	Pumas	50	1989–2010	Goalkeeper

== Statistics ==
=== Matches summary ===
As of 20 April 2024

Competition	Matches	Wins		Draws	Goals	
Competition	Matches	AME	Pumas	Draws	AME	Pumas
League (Note: Includes final phase matches.)	149	57	36	56	199	168
Cup	9	1	3	5	8	10
All matches	158	58	39	61	207	178

== Honours ==
National	América	Pumas	Total
Liga MX	15	7	22
Copa MX	6	1	7
Campeón de Campeones	7	2	9
Continental	América	Pumas	
CONCACAF Champions League	7	3	10
CONCACAF Giants Cup	2	—	2
Copa Interamericana	2	1	3
Overall	39	14	53

== Results ==
Liga MX †	Copa MX *	Campeón de Campeones ‡	Pre Pre Libertadores ^

No.	Season	Phase	Date	Location	Home team	Score	Away team
1	1962–63^{†}	Regular season	1 July 1962	Mexico City	América	2–0	Pumas
2	1962–63^{†}	Regular season	30 September 1962	Mexico City	Pumas	1–1	América
3	1962–63^{*}	Quarter-finals	5 May 1963	Mexico City	Pumas	1–0	América
4	1962–63^{*}	Quarter-finals	16 May 1963	Mexico City	América	0–0	Pumas
5	1963–64^{†}	Regular season	6 October 1963	Mexico City	Pumas	0–0	América
6	1963–64^{†}	Regular season	2 January 1964	Mexico City	América	1–1	Pumas
7	1964–65^{†}	Regular season	31 July 1964	Mexico City	Pumas	0–0	América
8	1964–65^{†}	Regular season	12 November 1964	Mexico City	América	1–0	Pumas
9	1964–65^{*}	Group stage	24 January 1965	Mexico City	Pumas	2–2	América
10	1964–65^{*}	Group stage	12 February 1965	Mexico City	América	2–3	Pumas
11	1965–66^{†}	Regular season	15 August 1965	Mexico City	América	0–0	Pumas
12	1965–66^{†}	Regular season	28 November 1965	Mexico City	Pumas	1–2	América
13	1966–67^{†}	Regular season	18 August 1966	Mexico City	América	5–1	Pumas
14	1966–67^{†}	Regular season	2 December 1966	Mexico City	Pumas	4–1	América
15	1967–68^{†}	Regular season	2 August 1967	Mexico City	América	1–1	Pumas
16	1967–68^{†}	Regular season	16 November 1967	Mexico City	Pumas	0–0	América
17	1968–69^{†}	Regular season	16 June 1968	Mexico City	Pumas	2–2	América
18	1968–69^{†}	Regular season	9 January 1969	Mexico City	América	1–1	Pumas
19	1969–70^{†}	Regular season	14 September 1969	Mexico City	América	1–3	América
20	1969–70^{†}	Regular season	23 December 1969	Mexico City	Pumas	0–0	América
21	Mexico '70^{†}	Regular season	6 August 1970	Mexico City	América	1–0	Pumas
22	Mexico '70^{†}	Regular season	27 September 1970	Mexico City	Pumas	2–0	América
23	1970–71^{†}	Regular season	13 March 1971	Mexico City	América	0–0	Pumas
24	1970–71^{†}	Regular season	8 July 1971	Mexico City	Pumas	2–2	América
25	1971–72^{†}	Regular season	2 December 1971	Mexico City	Pumas	0–1	América
26	1971–72^{†}	Regular season	2 April 1972	Mexico City	América	0–1	Pumas
27	1972–73^{†}	Regular season	28 September 1972	Mexico City	América	0–0	Pumas
28	1972–73^{†}	Regular season	25 January 1973	Mexico City	Pumas	1–2	América
29	1973–74^{†}	Regular season	6 September 1973	Mexico City	América	2–1	Pumas
30	1973–74^{*}	Group stage	22 November 1973	Mexico City	Pumas	2–2	América
31	1973–74^{†}	Regular season	21 February 1974	Mexico City	Pumas	1–1	América
32	1974–75^{†}	Regular season	29 August 1974	Mexico City	América	3–2	Pumas
33	1974–75^{†}	Regular season	1 March 1975	Mexico City	Pumas	0–2	América
34	1974–75^{*}	Final stage	17 July 1975	Mexico City	América	0–1	Pumas
35	1974–75^{*}	Final stage	20 July 1975	Mexico City	Pumas	0–0	América
36	1975–76^{†}	Regular season	22 February 1976	Mexico City	Pumas	0–0	América
37	1975–76^{†}	Regular season	1 July 1976	Mexico City	América	2–1	Pumas
38	1976–77^{†}	Regular season	14 November 1976	Mexico City	Pumas	2–0	América
39	1976–77^{†}	Regular season	27 March 1977	Mexico City	América	2–1	Pumas
40	1977–78^{†}	Regular season	18 September 1977	Mexico City	América	4–2	Pumas
41	1977–78^{†}	Regular season	19 January 1978	Mexico City	Pumas	2–1	América
42	1978–79^{†}	Regular season	29 October 1978	Mexico City	Pumas	2–0	América
43	1978–79^{†}	Regular season	9 March 1979	Mexico City	América	0–3	Pumas
44	1979–80^{†}	Regular season	2 December 1979	Mexico City	América	0–2	Pumas
45	1979–80^{†}	Regular season	13 April 1980	Mexico City	Pumas	2–4	América
46	1979–80^{†}	Play-offs	26 June 1980	Mexico City	Pumas	0–1	América
47	1979–80^{†}	Play-offs	6 July 1980	Mexico City	América	0–0	Pumas
48	1980–81^{†}	Regular season	13 December 1980	Mexico City	Pumas	2–2	América
49	1980–81^{†}	Regular season	26 April 1981	Mexico City	América	1–1	Pumas
50	1981–82^{†}	Regular season	16 October 1981	Mexico City	América	2–0	Pumas
51	1981–82^{†}	Regular season	21 February 1982	Mexico City	Pumas	0–0	América
52	1982–83^{†}	Regular season	12 September 1982	Mexico City	Pumas	1–1	América
53	1982–83^{†}	Regular season	16 January 1983	Mexico City	América	2–0	Pumas
54	1983–84^{†}	Regular season	2 October 1983	Mexico City	América	1–2	Pumas
55	1983–84^{†}	Regular season	12 February 1984	Mexico City	Pumas	2–1	América
56	1984–85^{†}	Regular season	12 December 1984	Mexico City	Pumas	1–0	América
57	1984–85^{†}	Regular season	21 April 1985	Mexico City	América	2–2	Pumas
58	1984–85^{†}	Final	23 May 1985	Mexico City	América	1–1	Pumas
59	1984–85^{†}	Final	26 May 1985	Mexico City	Pumas	0–0	América
60	1984–85^{†}	Final	28 May 1985	Querétaro	América	3–1	Pumas
61	1986–87^{†}	Regular season	28 September 1986	Mexico City	América	2–2	Pumas
62	1986–87^{†}	Regular season	22 February 1987	Mexico City	Pumas	0–2	América
63	1987–88^{†}	Regular season	16 October 1987	Mexico City	América	2–2	Pumas
64	1987–88^{†}	Regular season	20 March 1988	Mexico City	Pumas	1–4	América
65	1987–88^{†}	Final	30 June 1988	Mexico City	Pumas	1–0	América
66	1987–88^{†}	Final	3 July 1988	Mexico City	América	4–1	Pumas
67	1988–89^{*}	Group stage	24 September 1988	Mexico City	América	1–0	Pumas
68	1988–89^{*}	Group stage	12 October 1988	Mexico City	Pumas	1–1	América
69	1988–89^{†}	Regular season	3 February 1989	Mexico City	Pumas	1–2	América
70	1988–89^{†}	Regular season	4 June 1989	Mexico City	América	0–1	Pumas
71	1989–90^{†}	Regular season	8 December 1989	Mexico City	América	3–3	Pumas
72	1989–90^{†}	Regular season	8 April 1990	Mexico City	Pumas	1–1	América
73	1990–91^{†}	Regular season	13 January 1991	Mexico City	Pumas	5–2	América
74	1990–91^{†}	Regular season	19 June 1991	Mexico City	América	1–0	Pumas
75	1990–91^{†}	Final	19 July 1991	Mexico City	América	3–2	Pumas
76	1990–91^{†}	Final	22 July 1991	Mexico City	Pumas	1–0	América
77	1996–97^{†}	Regular season	17 November 1996	Mexico City	América	2-2	Pumas
78	1996–97^{†}	Regular season	27 April 1997	Mexico City	Pumas	2-1	América
79	1997–98^{†}	Regular season	21 August 1997	Mexico City	Pumas	1-2	América
80	1997–98^{†}	Regular season	31 January 1998	Mexico City	América	1-3	Pumas
81	1998–99^{^}	First Stage	19 August 1998	Chicago	Pumas	0-0 (3-4 p.)	América
82	1998–99^{†}	Regular season	11 October 1998	Mexico City	Pumas	3–1	América
83	1998–99^{†}	Regular season	28 March 1999	Mexico City	América	3–1	Pumas
84	1999–2000^{†}	Regular season	3 November 1999	Mexico City	América	1-2	Pumas
85	1999–2000^{†}	Regular season	16 April 2000	Mexico City	Pumas	4-1	América
86	2000–01^{^}	First Stage	23 August 2000	Chicago	Pumas	0-0	América
87	2000–01^{†}	Regular season	29 October 2000	Mexico City	América	2-1	Pumas
88	2000–01^{†}	Regular season	1 March 2001	Mexico City	Pumas	1-1	América
89	2001–02^{†}	Regular season	9 September 2001	Mexico City	Pumas	1-1	América
90	2001–02^{†}	Regular season	24 February 2002	Mexico City	América	0-0	Pumas
91	2001–02^{†}	Play-offs	15 May 2002	Mexico City	América	0-0	Pumas
92	2001–02^{†}	Play-offs	18 May 2002	Mexico City	Pumas	1–2	América
93	2002–03^{†}	Regular season	14 September 2002	Mexico City	Pumas	1-3	América
94	2002–03^{†}	Regular season	2 March 2003	Mexico City	América	1-1	Pumas
95	2003–04^{†}	Regular season	13 August 2003	Mexico City	Pumas	4-3	América
96	2003–04^{†}	Regular season	18 January 2004	Mexico City	América	1-1	Pumas
97	2004–05^{†}	Regular season	17 October 2004	Mexico City	América	0-3	Pumas
98	2004–05^{†}	Regular season	20 March 2005	Mexico City	Pumas	2-3	América
99	2004–05^{‡}	Final	23 July 2005	Mexico City	Pumas	0-0	América
100	2004–05^{‡}	Final	27 July 2005	Mexico City	América	2-1	Pumas
101	2005–06^{†}	Regular season	30 October 2005	Mexico City	Pumas	1-2	América
102	2005–06^{†}	Regular season	9 April 2006	Mexico City	América	1-3	Pumas
103	2006–07^{†}	Regular season	22 October 2006	Mexico City	América	2-0	Pumas
104	2006–07^{†}	Regular season	8 April 2007	Mexico City	Pumas	1-1	América
105	2007–08^{†}	Regular season	19 August 2007	Mexico City	Pumas	1-1	América
106	2007–08^{†}	Regular season	3 February 2008	Mexico City	América	2-0	Pumas
107	2008–09^{†}	Regular season	5 October 2008	Mexico City	Pumas	1-1	América
108	2008–09^{†}	Regular season	22 March 2009	Mexico City	América	0-0	Pumas
109	2009–10^{†}	Regular season	4 November 2009	Mexico City	Pumas	3-2	América
110	2009–10^{†}	Regular season	14 April 2010	Mexico City	América	0-0	Pumas
111	2010–11^{†}	Regular season	14 November 2010	Mexico City	América	0-1	Pumas
112	2010–11^{†}	Regular season	1 May 2011	Mexico City	Pumas	0-2	América
113	2011–12^{†}	Regular season	2 October 2011	Mexico City	Pumas	1-0	América
114	2011–12^{†}	Regular season	18 March 2012	Mexico City	América	2-1	Pumas
115	2012–13^{†}	Regular season	28 October 2012	Mexico City	Pumas	0-1	América
116	2012–13^{†}	Regular season	20 April 2013	Mexico City	América	1-0	Pumas
117	2012–13^{†}	Play-offs	8 May 2013	Mexico City	Pumas	0-1	América
118	2012–13^{†}	Play-offs	11 May 2013	Mexico City	América	2-1	Pumas
119	2013–14^{†}	Regular season	2 September 2013	Mexico City	Pumas	1-4	América
120	2013–14^{†}	Regular season	22 February 2014	Mexico City	América	1-3	Pumas
121	2014–15^{†}	Regular season	30 August 2014	Mexico City	América	0-1	Pumas
122	2014–15^{†}	Play-offs	26 November 2014	Mexico City	Pumas	1-0	América
123	2014–15^{†}	Play-offs	29 November 2014	Mexico City	América	1-0	Pumas
124	2014–15^{†}	Regular season	22 February 2015	Mexico City	Pumas	0-1	América
125	2015–16^{†}	Regular season	21 November 2015	Mexico City	América	1-1	Pumas
126	2015–16^{†}	Play-offs	3 December 2015	Mexico City	América	0-3	Pumas
127	2015–16^{†}	Play-offs	6 December 2015	Mexico City	Pumas	1-3	América
128	2015–16^{†}	Regular season	8 May 2016	Mexico City	Pumas	1-1	América
129	2016–17^{†}	Regular season	24 September 2016	Mexico City	América	2-1	Pumas
130	2016–17^{†}	Regular season	19 March 2017	Mexico City	Pumas	2-3	América
131	2017–18^{†}	Regular season	5 August 2017	Mexico City	América	2-1	Pumas
132	2017–18^{†}	Regular season	21 January 2018	Mexico City	Pumas	0-0	América
133	2017–18^{†}	Play-offs	2 May 2018	Mexico City	Pumas	1-4	América
134	2017–18^{†}	Play-offs	5 May 2018	Mexico City	América	2-1	Pumas
135	2018–19^{†}	Regular season	25 August 2018	Mexico City	América	2-2	Pumas
136	2018–19^{†}	Play-offs	6 December 2018	Mexico City	Pumas	1-1	América
137	2018–19^{†}	Play-offs	9 December 2018	Mexico City	América	6-1	Pumas
138	2018–19^{†}	Regular season	17 February 2019	Mexico City	Pumas	1-0	América
139	2019–20^{†}	Regular season	14 September 2019	Mexico City	América	1-1	Pumas
140	2019–20^{†}	Regular season	1 March 2020	Mexico City	Pumas	3-3	América
141	2020–21^{†}	Regular season	3 October 2020	Mexico City	América	2-2	Pumas
142	2020–21^{†}	Regular season	2 May 2021	Mexico City	Pumas	0-1	América
143	2021–22^{†}	Regular season	3 October 2021	Mexico City	América	2-0	Pumas
144	2021–22^{†}	Play-offs	24 November 2021	Mexico City	Pumas	0-0	América
145	2021–22^{†}	Play-offs	27 November 2021	Mexico City	América	1-3	Pumas
146	2021–22^{†}	Regular season	26 February 2022	Mexico City	Pumas	0-0	América
