= 1953–54 Toluca FC season =

Toluca
1953–54 season
- Manager: Fernando García
- Stadium: Campo Patria
- Primera División: 5th
- Copa México: Group stage
- Top goalscorer: League: Carlos Carús (11 goals); All: Carlos Carús (13 goals)
- Biggest win: Toluca 3–0 Necaxa (1 November 1953)
- Biggest defeat: Atlas 5–2 Toluca (25 April 1954)
Home colours	Away colours

The 1953–54 season was Toluca FC's fourth as a professional club and their first in the Primera División, the top flight of Mexican football. Toluca competed in both the Primera División and the Copa México that season, having earned promotion after winning the 1952–53 Segunda División season in the second-tier division. The club made their Primera División debut on 9 August 1953, defeating Atlante 2–1.

== Coaching staff ==
Position	Name
Head coach	(Mexico) Fernando García

== Competitions ==
=== Overview ===
Competition	First match	Last match	Starting round	Final position	Record							
Competition	First match	Last match	Starting round	Final position	Pld	W	D	L	GF	GA	GD	Win %
Primera División	9 August 1953	7 February 1954	Matchday 1	5th	22	8	7	7	35	34	+1	36.36
Copa México	21 March 1954	25 April 1954	Group stage	Group stage	5	1	1	3	8	14	−6	20.00
Total					27	9	8	10	43	48	−5	33.33

Source: RSSSF

=== Primera División ===
==== Matches ====
9 August 1953 1	Toluca	2–1	Atlante	Toluca
	Carús 17', 37'		Ávalos 82'	Stadium: Campo Patria; Referee: Valenzuela

19 August 1953 2	Necaxa	2–1	Toluca	Mexico City
	Iturralde 9', 37'		Carús 83'	Stadium: Estadio Olímpico de la Ciudad de los Deportes

23 August 1953 3	Toluca	2–2	Atlas	Toluca
	Palos 33', 62'		Carrillo 28'; Torres 82'	Stadium: Campo Patria

19 August 1953 4	Marte	0–2	Toluca	Cuernavaca
			Torres 15', 61'	Stadium: Deportivo Morelos; Referee: Valenzuela

=== Copa México ===
==== Group stage ====
Team	Pld	W	D	L	GF	GA	GD	Pts
América	6	3	2	1	11	11	0	8
León	6	3	1	2	13	6	+7	7
Atlas	6	2	2	2	11	12	−1	6
Toluca	5	1	1	3	8	14	−6	3

Source: RSSSF

21 March 1954 1	León	2–0	Toluca	León
	Olivera 8', 12'			Stadium: Estadio La Martinica

28 March 1954 2	Toluca	1–1	Atlas	Toluca
	Carús 90'		Vázquez 70'	Stadium: Campo Patria

21 March 1954 3	América	3–2	Toluca	Mexico City
	González 17'; Fizel 59' (pen.), 82'		Carús 15'; Lázcares 21'	Stadium: Estadio Olímpico de la Ciudad de los Deportes; Referee: Barba Tamayo

11 April 1954 4	Toluca	2–1	León	Toluca
	Bárcenas 33'; Malanchane 52'		Santillán 10'	Stadium: Campo Patria; Referee: Crawford

18 April 1954 5	Toluca	1–2	América	Toluca
	Pérez 75' (pen.)		Santiago 24'; Fizel 37'	Stadium: Campo Patria

25 April 1954 6	Atlas	5–2	Toluca	Guadalajara
12:00	Torres 28', 49'; González 47'; Franco 73', 78'		Lázcares 8'; Malanchane 56'	Stadium: Parque Oblatos; Referee: Crawford

== Statistics ==
=== Goals ===
Rank	Player	Position	Primera División	Copa México	Total
1	(Mexico) Carlos Carús	FW	11	2	13
2	(Costa Rica) Carlos Lázcares	FW	7	2	9
3	(Mexico) Humberto Pérez	FW	7	1	8
4	(Argentina) Rubén Malanchane	FW	3	2	5
5	(Mexico) Higinio Palos		3	0	3
6	(Mexico) Rubén Pichardo		2	0	2
6	(Mexico) Pedro Torres		2	0	2
7	(Mexico) Zitácuaro Bárcenas		0	1	1
Total			35	8	43
