= 1954 Copa México final =

- Event: 1953–54 Copa México
| América | Guadalajara |
| 1 | 1 |
- After extra time América won 3–2 on penalties
- Date: 12 May 1954
- Venue: Estadio Ciudad de los Deportes, Mexico City
- Referee: Geoffrey Sunderland
- Attendance: 30,000

The 1954 Copa México final was the final match of the 1953–54 Copa México. It was played at Estadio Ciudad de los Deportes in Mexico City, Mexico, 12 May 1954. América beat Guadalajara 3–2 on penalties after the match finished 1–1 after extra time.

This was the first cup title for América in the professional era of Mexican football. The match is considered as a very important moment in the history of the América-Guadalajara rivalry, since it was the first cup final contested by both sides.

== Route to the final ==
América
Round
Guadalajara
Opponents
Result
Group stage
Opponents
Result
Atlas
1–1 (A)
Match 1
Tampico Madero
2–1 (A)
León
2–2 (H)
Match 2
Zacatepec
1–0 (H)
Toluca
3–2 (H)
Match 3
Necaxa
5–2 (A)
Atlas
3–2 (H)
Match 4
Zacatepec
1–1 (A)
Toluca
2–1 (A)
Match 5
Tampico Madero
0–0 (H)
León
0–3 (A)
Match 6
Necaxa
1–6 (A)
Group B winners

| Team | Pld | Pts |
|---|---|---|
| América | 6 | 8 |
| León | 6 | 7 |
| Atlas | 6 | 6 |
| Toluca | 5 | 3 |

Source: RSSSF
Final standings
Group C winners

| Team | Pld | Pts |
|---|---|---|
| Guadalajara | 6 | 8 |
| Zacatepec | 6 | 7 |
| Necaxa | 6 | 5 |
| Tampico Madero | 6 | 4 |

Source: RSSSF
Opponents
Result
Final stage
Opponents
Result
Atlante
2–0
Match 1
América
1–1
Guadalajara
1–1
Match 2
Atlante
3–1

== Background ==
The 1953–54 Copa México was played in two stages: the group stage with three groups of four teams each, each group winner would qualify to the final stage, where the three group winners would play one match against each other to define the champion.

Atlante, América and Guadalajara won their groups and advanced to the final stage, played at the Estadio Ciudad de los Deportes in Mexico City. América and Guadalajara defeated Atlante in their respective matches. The game between América and Guadalajara was a tie, therefore, both teams ended with three points each (one win and one draw), and since the two squads had the same goal difference, it was decided that a playoff match would take place to define the champion.

== Match ==
=== Summary ===
The game ended in a tie after 90 minutes of regular time with no goals for any side. The most relevant incident was a brawl between América's goalkeeper Manuel Camacho and Guadalajara's midfielder Javier de la Torre that resulted in Camacho being sent off. Since rules did not observe substitutions at the time, America's striker Eduardo González Palmer replaced Camacho.

At the end of regulation, two periods of overtime, each one of 15 minutes, where played. Just two minutes in overtime, Guadalajara's Arellano scored the first goal for his team. With 10 minutes remaining, José Santiago tied the game for América after scoring a penalty provoked by defender Pedro Nuño, who touched the ball with his hands inside the penalty area.

With the game tied again, two more periods of overtime, each one of 10 minutes, were played. No squad was able to score and with the score still tied, a series of penalties was kicked.

Each team had to choose only one player to kick three penalties. América picked Argentine striker Emilio Fizel and Juan Jasso was the striker for Guadalajara. Fizel scored all the three penalties. Jasso scored his first and third shots, but missed the second penalty, that was stopped by the game's hero, Eduardo González Palmer.

=== Details ===
12 May 1954

| América | 1–1 | Guadalajara |
|---|---|---|
| Santiago 110' (pen.) | | Arellano 92' |
Penalties
| Fizel (penalty scored); Fizel (penalty scored); Fizel (penalty scored) | 3–2 | (penalty scored) Jasso; (penalty missed) Jasso; (penalty scored) Jasso |

Estadio Ciudad de los Deportes, Mexico City
Attendance: 30,000
Referee: Geoffrey Sunderland

| América | Guadalajara |

| GK | 1 | (Mexico) Manuel Camacho |
| RB | 2 | (Argentina) Norberto Yácono |
| LB | 3 | (Mexico) Esqueda |
| HB | 4 | (Mexico) Manuel Gutiérrez |
| CB | 5 | (Argentina) Héctor Ferrari |
| HB | 6 | (Mexico) Pedro Nájera |
| OF | 7 | (Mexico) Pepín González |
| IF | 8 | (Argentina) José Santiago |
| CF | 9 | (Mexico) Eduardo González Palmer |
| IF | 10 | (Argentina) Emilio Fizel |
| OF | 11 | (Mexico) José Luis Buendía |
Manager:
(Mexico) Octavio Vial

| GK | 1 | (Mexico) Jaime Gómez |
| RB | 2 | (Mexico) Pedro Nuño |
| CB | 3 | (Mexico) Guillermo Sepúlveda |
| LB | 4 | (Mexico) José Villegas |
| CH | 5 | (Mexico) Juan Jasso |
| LH | 6 | (Mexico) Rafael Rivera |
| OR | 7 | (Mexico) Javier de la Torre |
| IR | 8 | (Mexico) Salvador Reyes |
| CF | 9 | (Mexico) Adalberto López |
| IL | 10 | (Mexico) Tomás Balcázar |
| OL | 11 | (Mexico) Raúl Arellano |
Manager:
(Argentina) José María Casullo
