= José Luis Guerrero =

Mexican footballer (born 1945)

Personal information
- Full name: José Luis Guerrero Hernández
- Date of birth: 24 August 1945 (age 81)
- Place of birth: Celaya, Guanajuato, Mexico
- Position: Center forward

Senior career*
Years	Team	Apps	(Gls)
1964–1971	Cruz Azul		
1972–1974	Pumas UNAM		

International career
1967	Mexico	1	(0)
- * Club domestic league appearances and goals

José Luis Guerrero Hernández (born 24 August 1945) is a retired Mexican footballer. Nicknamed "Gorras", he played as a center forward for Cruz Azul and Pumas UNAM throughout the 1960s and 1970s. He also represented Mexico at the 1967 CONCACAF Championship.

== Club career ==
Guerrero began his career for his state club Cruz Azul for the 1964–65 season. With his contributions to the club, it ended at eighth place out of sixteen teams. The following season would only see improvement for Guerrero as by the end of the 1965–66 season, he was the leading goalscorer for the club as well as the second goalscorer overall for the 1965–66 Mexican Primera División, behind Zague's 20 goals. Throughout a majority of his career, Guerrero played under manager Raúl Cárdenas as well as meeting chairman Guillermo Álvarez Macías. During the 1968–69 season, Guerrero was a part of the winning squad for the 1968–69 Mexican Primera División, the 1968–69 Copa México, the 1968–69 Campeón de Campeones and the 1969 CONCACAF Champions' Cup. This success continued into the 1970 season where Guerrero was a part of the winning squads for the 1970 Mexican Primera División and the 1970 CONCACAF Champions' Cup. However, he decided to terminate his contract with Cruz Azul after they had decided to relocate to Mexico City in 1971, opting instead to play for Pumas UNAM for the next two seasons before retiring in the 1973–74 season.

== International career ==
Guerrero briefly represented his home country of Mexico for the 1967 CONCACAF Championship under manager Ignacio Trelles. His only appearance was in the 4–0 victory over Nicaragua on 6 March 1967.

== Personal life ==
Guerrero continues to work for his former club of Cruz Azul as a coordinator of the football schools of the various farm teams of Cruz Azul.
