= Raúl Arellano =

Raúl Arellano may refer to:

- Raúl Arellano (footballer, born 1935) (1935–1997), Mexican football forward
- Raúl Arellano (footballer, born 1939), Mexican football forward
