= 1996–97 Toluca FC season =

Toluca
1996–97 season
- Chairman: Sergio Peláez
- Manager: Juan Manuel Álvarez
- Stadium: Estadio Toluca 70–86
- Invierno: 5th Playoffs: Quarterfinals
- Verano: 11th
- Copa México: Group stage
- Top goalscorer: League: José Cardozo (10 goals); All: Carlos María Morales (11 goals)
- Biggest win: Toluca 5–0 UAG (17 August 1996)
- Biggest defeat: Pachuca 3–0 Toluca (25 August 1996)
Home colours	Away colours
- All statistics correct as of 28 December 2018.

The 1996–97 Deportivo Toluca F.C. season was the 90th season in the football club's history and the 44th consecutive season in the top flight of Mexican football.

== Players ==
=== Squad information ===
No.	Pos.	Nat.	Name	Date of birth (age)	Signed in	Previous club
Goalkeepers
1	GK	(Argentina)	Luis Islas	22 December 1965 (aged 30)	1996	(Argentina) Platense
12	GK	(Mexico)	Jesús Alfaro	1 January 1968 (aged 28)	1994	(Mexico) UAT
Defenders
2	DF	(Mexico)	Eugenio Villazón	19 September 1972 (aged 23)	1994	
3	DF	(Mexico)	Manuel Vidrio	23 August 1972 (aged 23)	1996	(Mexico) Guadalajara
4	DF	(Mexico)	Salvador Carmona	22 August 1975 (aged 20)	1993	
5	DF	(Mexico)	Omar Blanco	17 July 1975 (aged 20)	1996	(Mexico) Atlas
11	DF	(Mexico)	Efraín Herrera	18 September 1959 (aged 36)	1995	(Mexico) Necaxa
13	DF	(Mexico)	Alberto Macías	28 December 1969 (aged 26)	1990	
16	DF	(Mexico)	Héctor Ruiz	2 October 1973 (aged 22)	1996	
19	DF	(Mexico)	Adrián García Arias	6 December 1975 (aged 20)	1996	
33	DF	(Mexico)	Adán Núñez	27 February 1974 (aged 22)	1996	
Midfielders
6	MF	(Mexico)	Antonio Taboada	11 September 1967 (aged 28)	1996	(Mexico) Cruz Azul
7	MF	(Mexico)	Víctor Ruiz	7 June 1969 (aged 27)	1996	(Mexico) Cruz Azul
8	MF	(Mexico)	Marcelino Bernal	27 May 1962 (aged 34)	1991	(Mexico) Puebla
8	MF	(Mexico)	Jaime Ordiales	23 December 1963 (aged 32)	1996	(Mexico) León
10	MF	(Chile)	Fabián Estay	5 October 1968 (aged 27)	1996	(Chile) Colo-Colo
18	MF	(Mexico)	David Rangel	12 November 1969 (aged 26)	1996	(Mexico) Cruz Azul
27	MF	(Mexico)	Enrique Alfaro	11 December 1974 (aged 21)	1994	
28	MF	(Mexico)	Gilberto Mora	15 November 1976 (aged 19)	1994	
Forwards
7	FW	(Mexico)	Armando González	16 November 1968 (aged 27)	1996	(Mexico) UAG
9	FW	(Paraguay)	José Cardozo	19 March 1971 (aged 25)	1995	(Paraguay) Olimpia
15	FW	(Uruguay)	Carlos María Morales	1 March 1970 (aged 26)	1995	(Chile) Unión Española
17	FW	(Argentina)	Ariel Zárate	13 July 1973 (aged 22)	1996	(Argentina) Vélez Sarsfield
23	FW	(Mexico)	José Manuel Abundis	11 June 1973 (aged 23)	1992	(Mexico) Youth System
25	FW	(Mexico)	Eduardo Lillingston	23 December 1977 (aged 18)	1996	

Players and squad numbers last updated on 28 December 2018.
Note: Flags indicate national team as has been defined under FIFA eligibility rules. Players may hold more than one non-FIFA nationality.

== Competitions ==
=== Overview ===
Competition	First match	Last match	Starting round	Final position	Record							
Competition	First match	Last match	Starting round	Final position	Pld	W	D	L	GF	GA	GD	Win %
Torneo Invierno	10 August 1996	7 December 1996	Matchday 1	5th	19	9	4	6	27	17	+10	47.37
Torneo Verano	11 January 1997	4 May 1997	Matchday 1	11th	17	5	6	6	26	21	+5	29.41
Copa México	30 June 1996	28 July 1996	Group stage	Group stage	8	1	2	5	9	13	−4	12.50
Total					44	15	12	17	62	51	+11	34.09

Source: RSSSF.com

=== Torneo Invierno ===
==== League table ====
Pos	Team	Pld	W	D	L	GF	GA	GD	Pts	Qualification or relegation
3	Guadalajara	17	9	4	4	33	19	+14	31	Advance to Liguilla (Playoffs)
4	Puebla	17	9	4	4	32	22	+10	31	Advance to Liguilla (Playoffs)
5	Toluca	17	9	3	5	26	15	+11	30	Advance to Liguilla (Playoffs)
6	Necaxa	17	8	5	4	24	19	+5	29	Advance to Liguilla (Playoffs)
7	Atlas	17	6	8	3	28	26	+2	26	Advance to Repechage

Source: Liga MX
Rules for classification: 1) Points; 2) Goal difference; 3) Number of goals scored; 4) Head-to-head results between tied teams; 5) Number of goals scored away; 6) Highest relegation coefficient; 7) Fair Play points

==== Results summary ====
Overall								Home						Away					
Pld	W	D	L	GF	GA	GD	Pts	W	D	L	GF	GA	GD	W	D	L	GF	GA	GD
17	9	3	5	26	15	+11	30	6	1	2	16	5	+11	3	2	3	10	10	0

Source: RSSSF.com

==== Result round by round ====
Round	1	2	3	4	5	6	7	8	9	10	11	12	13	14	15	16	17
Ground	A	H	A	H	A	H	A	H	A	H	H	A	H	A	H	A	H
Result	L	W	L	D	W	W	D	W	D	L	W	W	L	W	W	L	W

Source: RSSSF.com
A = Away; H = Home; W = Win; D = Draw; L = Loss

==== Matches ====
10 August 1996 1	Puebla	2–1	Toluca	Puebla
19:00 CST	Guzmán 39'; Muñoz 74'	Report	Abundis 85'	Stadium: Estadio Cuauhtémoc

17 August 1996 2	Toluca	5–0	UAG	Toluca
15:00 CST	Morales 29', 53'; Cardozo 69', 89'; Bernal 73'	Report		Stadium: Estadio Toluca 70-86; Referee: Antonio Marrufo

25 August 1996 3	Pachuca	3–0	Toluca	Pachuca
12:00 CST	Medford 47'; Farfán 67'; Sáez 75'	Report		Stadium: Estadio Hidalgo; Referee: Pascual Rebolledo

11 September 1996 4	Toluca	0–0	Atlante	Toluca
15:00 CST		Report		Stadium: Estadio Toluca 70-86

8 September 1996 5	Celaya	0–1	Toluca	Celaya
12:00 CST		Report	Bernal 11'	Stadium: Estadio Miguel Alemán Valdés; Referee: Eduardo Brizio

14 September 1996 6	Toluca	1–0	Monterrey	Toluca
15:00 CST	Cardozo 70'	Report		Stadium: Estadio Toluca 70-86; Referee: Felipe Ramos Rizo

21 September 1996 7	Veracruz	1–1	Toluca	Veracruz
19:00 CST	Fasciolli 90'	Report	Cardozo 75'	Stadium: Estadio Luis "Pirata" Fuente; Referee: Armando Archundia

28 September 1996 8	Toluca	2–0	Necaxa	Toluca
15:00 CST	Abundis 51'; Macías 83'	Report		Stadium: Estadio Toluca 70-86; Referee: Gonzalo González

5 October 1996 9	Atlas	1–1	Toluca	Guadalajara
20:45 CST	Franco 69'	Report	Bernal 75'	Stadium: Estadio Jalisco; Referee: León Padró Borja

12 October 1996 10	Toluca	0–2	Santos Laguna	Toluca
15:00 CST		Report	Muñoz 61'; Borgetti 88'	Stadium: Estadio Toluca 70-86; Referee: Edgar Ulises Rangel

19 October 1996 11	Toluca	1–0	Toros Neza	Toluca
15:00 CST	Cardozo 82'	Report		Stadium: Estadio Toluca 70-86; Referee: Eduardo Brizio

25 October 1996 12	UNAM	0–3	Toluca	Mexico City
15:00 CST		Report	Carreón 4' (o.g.); Cardozo 72'; Alfaro 74'	Stadium: Estadio Olímpico Universitario; Referee: Miguel Ángel Salas

2 November 1996 13	Toluca	2–3	León	Toluca
15:00 CST	Bernal 53'; Estay 69'	Report	Tita 17'; Segoviano 30'; Martínez 80'	Stadium: Estadio Toluca 70-86

10 November 1996 14	América	1–2	Toluca	Mexico City
12:00 CST	Macías 56' (o.g.)	Report	Alfaro 14'; Carmona 75'	Stadium: Estadio Azteca; Referee: Miguel Ángel Salas

14 November 1996 15	Toluca	1–0	Morelia	Toluca
15:00 CST	Chávez 14' (o.g.)	Report		Stadium: Estadio Toluca 70-86; Referee: Pascual Rebolledo

17 November 1996 16	Guadalajara	2–1	Toluca	Guadalajara
12:00 CST	Suárez 50', 64' (pen.)	Report	Abundis 10'	Stadium: Estadio Jalisco; Referee: Armando Archundia

24 November 1996 17	Toluca	4–0	Cruz Azul	Toluca
15:00 CST	Cardozo 12'; Bernal 31'; Morales 65', 78'	Report		Stadium: Estadio Toluca 70-86; Referee: Eduardo Brizio

===== Liguilla =====
====== Quarter-finals ======
4 December 1996 First leg	Toluca	1–2	Puebla	Toluca
15:00 CST	Rangel 43'	Report	Blanco 46' (o.g.); dos Santos 66'	Stadium: Estadio Toluca 70-86; Referee: Antonio Marrufo

7 December 1996 Second leg	Puebla	0–0	Toluca	Puebla
19:00 CST		Report		Stadium: Estadio Cuauhtémoc; Referee: León Padró Borja

=== Torneo Verano ===
==== League table ====
Pos	Team	Pld	W	D	L	GF	GA	GD	Pts	Qualification or relegation
9	Cruz Azul	17	7	4	6	21	24	−3	25	
10	León	17	5	8	4	21	18	+3	23	
11	Toluca	17	5	6	6	26	21	+5	21	
12	UAG	17	5	5	7	26	24	+2	20	Advance to Repechage
13	Puebla	17	4	8	5	15	18	−3	20	

Source: Liga MX
Rules for classification: 1) Points; 2) Goal difference; 3) Number of goals scored; 4) Head-to-head results between tied teams; 5) Number of goals scored away; 6) Highest relegation coefficient; 7) Fair Play points

==== Results summary ====
Overall								Home						Away					
Pld	W	D	L	GF	GA	GD	Pts	W	D	L	GF	GA	GD	W	D	L	GF	GA	GD
17	5	6	6	26	21	+5	21	4	2	2	12	6	+6	1	4	4	14	15	−1

Source: RSSSF.com

==== Result round by round ====
Round	1	2	3	4	5	6	7	8	9	10	11	12	13	14	15	16	17
Ground	H	A	H	A	H	A	H	A	H	A	A	H	A	H	A	H	A
Result	D	D	D	L	W	W	W	D	W	L	L	W	D	L	D	L	L

Source: RSSSF.com
A = Away; H = Home; W = Win; D = Draw; L = Loss

==== Matches ====
11 January 1997 1	Toluca	0–0	Puebla	Toluca
15:00 CST		Report		Stadium: Estadio Toluca 70-86; Referee: Jorge Eduardo Gasso

29 January 1997 2	UAG	1–1	Toluca	Zapopan
20:30 CST	López 64'	Report	Estay 11'	Stadium: Estadio Tres de Marzo; Referee: Eduardo Brizio

25 January 1997 3	Toluca	1–1	Pachuca	Toluca
15:00 CST	Bernal 50'	Report	Sáez 48'	Stadium: Estadio Toluca 70-86; Referee: Miguel Ángel Salas

2 February 1997 4	Atlante	3–2	Toluca	Mexico City
12:00 CST	Carbajal 20'; Jáuregui 52'; Carty 68'	Report	Cardozo 25', 70'	Stadium: Estadio Azteca; Referee: León Padró Borja

8 February 1997 5	Toluca	2–0	Celaya	Toluca
15:00 CST	Alfaro 47'; Lillingston 73'	Report		Stadium: Estadio Toluca 70-86; Referee: Antonio Marrufo

15 February 1997 6	Monterrey	1–4	Toluca	Monterrey
17:00 CST	Patiño 46'	Report	Morales 2'; Bernal 7'; Lillingston 77'; Alfaro 79'	Stadium: Estadio Tecnológico; Referee: José Luis García

22 February 1997 7	Toluca	2–1	Veracruz	Toluca
15:00 CST	González 6'; Morales 85'	Report	Valenciano 33'	Stadium: Estadio Toluca 70-86; Referee: Edgar Ulises Rangel

5 March 1997 8	Necaxa	1–1	Toluca	Mexico City
20:45 CST	García Aspe 35'	Report	Abundis 52'	Stadium: Estadio Azteca; Referee: Gilberto Alcalá

8 March 1997 9	Toluca	4–0	Atlas	Toluca
15:00 CST	Cardozo 40'; Morales 66'; Estay 68'; Ordiales 77'	Report		Stadium: Estadio Toluca 70-86; Referee: Germán Arredondo

16 March 1997 10	Santos Laguna	2–1	Toluca	Torreón
16:00 CST	Gabriel de Anda 20'; Caballero 59'	Report	Estay 64'	Stadium: Estadio Corona; Referee: Pascual Rebolledo

23 March 1997 11	Toros Neza	2–1	Toluca	Ciudad Nezahualcóyotl
15:00 CST	Nildeson 20'; Vázquez 83'	Report	Alfaro 4'	Stadium: Estadio Neza 86; Referee: Marco Antonio Rodríguez

1 April 1997 12	Toluca	1–0	UNAM	Toluca
15:00 CST	Morales 3'	Report		Stadium: Estadio Toluca 70-86; Referee: Sergio Herrera

5 April 1997 13	León	1–1	Toluca	León
20:15 CST	Torres 3'	Report	González 35'	Stadium: Estadio León; Referee: León Padró Borja

9 April 1997 14	Toluca	1–2	América	Toluca
15:00 CST	Carmona 24'	Report	Villa 60'; Pineda 82'	Stadium: Estadio Toluca 70-86; Referee: Gilberto Alcalá

23 April 1997 15	Morelia	1–1	Toluca	Morelia
16:00 CST	Figueroa 77' (pen.)	Report	Bernal 72' (pen.)	Stadium: Estadio Morelos; Referee: Edgar Ulises Rangel

27 April 1997 16	Toluca	1–2	Guadalajara	Toluca
15:00 CST	Vidrio 4'	Report	Nápoles 86'; Hernández 88'	Stadium: Estadio Toluca 70-86; Referee: Antonio Marrufo

4 May 1997 17	Cruz Azul	3–2	Toluca	Mexico City
12:00 CST	Hermosillo 12', 53'; Palencia 90'	Report	Morales 66'; Estay 82'	Stadium: Estadio Azul; Referee: Arturo Brizio

=== Copa México ===
==== Group stage ====
Group 1
Pos	Team	Pld	W	PKW	PKL	L	GF	GA	GD	Pts	Qualification
1	Toros Neza	8	6	0	0	2	17	8	+9	18	Advanced to the next phase
2	San Luis	8	5	0	0	3	14	11	+3	15	
3	Irapuato	8	4	0	2	2	11	7	+4	12	
4	Pachuca	8	4	0	1	3	13	10	+3	12	
5	Atlante F.C.	8	4	0	0	4	11	12	−1	12	
6	Morelia	8	3	1	0	4	10	12	−2	12	
7	Cruz Azul Hidalgo	8	3	1	1	3	9	13	−4	12	
8	Toluca	8	1	2	0	5	9	13	−4	9	
9	Celaya	8	1	1	1	5	7	15	−8	6	

== Statistics ==
=== Goals ===
Rank	Player	Position	Invierno	Verano	Copa México	Total
1	(Uruguay) Carlos María Morales	FW	4	5	2	11
2	(Paraguay) José Cardozo	FW	7	3	0	10
3	(Mexico) Marcelino Bernal	MF	5	3	1	9
4	(Mexico) Eduardo Lillingston	FW	0	2	4	6
5	(Mexico) Enrique Alfaro	MF	2	3	0	5
5	(Chile) Fabián Estay	MF	1	4	0	5
7	(Mexico) José Manuel Abundis	FW	3	1	0	4
8	(Mexico) Salvador Carmona	DF	1	1	0	2
8	(Mexico) Armando González	FW	0	2	0	2
8	(Mexico) Alberto Macías	DF	2	0	0	2
11	(Mexico) Gilberto Mora	MF	0	0	1	1
11	(Mexico) Jaime Ordiales	MF	0	1	0	1
11	(Mexico) David Rangel	MF	1	0	0	1
11	(Mexico) Manuel Vidrio	DF	0	1	0	1
Total			26	26	8	60

=== Own goals ===
Player	Against	Result	Date	Competition
(Mexico) Alberto Macías	América	2–1 (A)	10 November 1996	Primera División
(Mexico) Omar Blanco	Puebla	1–2 (H)	4 December 1996	Primera División

=== Clean sheets ===
Rank	Name	Invierno	Verano	Copa México	Total
1	(Argentina) Luis Islas	10	4	1	15
Total		10	4	1	15
