= Zague (footballer, born 1934) =

Brazilian footballer (1934–2021)

Personal information
- Full name: José Alves dos Santos
- Date of birth: 10 August 1934
- Place of birth: Salvador, Bahia, Brazil
- Date of death: 19 January 2021 (aged 86)
- Place of death: São Paulo, Brazil
- Position: Forward

Senior career*
Years	Team	Apps	(Gls)
- Botafogo
1956–1961	Corinthians	241	(127)
1961–1969	América	299	(109)
- * Club domestic league appearances and goals

José Alves dos Santos, nicknamed Zague (10 August 1934 – 19 January 2021) was a Brazilian footballer who played as a forward. Among the teams he played for were Corinthians in his home country, and Club América in Mexico.

== Club career ==
Zague was only one of several high-profile signings made in the early years of Emilio Azcárraga Milmo's ownership of Club América. Azcárraga, the owner of the Mexican television network Televisa, purchased both Zague and Francisco Moacyr, another Brazilian, prior to the 1961-1962 season.

As a striker, Zague would rarely leave the opposing penalty box or run towards the ball, instead preferring to let other players pass to him so he could shoot from a comfortable distance. For these reasons, he was known as "The Lone Wolf" by media and fans alike.

Alves scored 102 goals for Club América, of which 86 were made for the Aguilas during league competitions. He also won the Golden Boot after the 1965-66 season, in which he scored 20 goals.

== Personal life ==
Zague was born in Bahia, Brazil. He was the father of Luís Roberto Alves, nicknamed Zaguinho and Zague, who would also go on to play for Club América and for the Selección de fútbol de México (Mexico national team) because Luis Roberto was born in Mexico, during his father's playing days for América.

== Honours ==
América

- Primera División: 1965–66
- Copa México: 1963–64, 1964–65
- Copa Adolfo Lopez Mateos 1963

Individual

- Primera División Top Goal Scorer: 1965–66
