= 1963–64 Copa México =

Tournament details
- Country: Mexico
- Teams: 14

Final positions
- Champions: América (3rd title)
- Runner-up: Monterrey

Tournament statistics
- Matches played: 58

The 1963–64 Copa México also known as the Copa Presidente Adolfo Lopez Mateo is the 48th staging of the Copa México, a Mexican football cup competition that existed from 1907 to 1997, but the 21st staging in the professional era.

The competition started on February 23, 1964, and concluded on April 21, 1964, with the Final, held at the Estadio Olímpico Universitario in Mexico City, in which América lifted the trophy for the third time ever with a 6–5 victory over Monterrey in penalty kicks.

== First round ==
América and Atlas bye to next round

Team 1	Agg.	Team 2	1st leg	2nd leg
Monterrey	5-1	Ciudad Madero	2–0	3-1
Tampico	2-5	Nuevo León	0-2	2-3
Necaxa	4-1	Cruz Azul	1–0	3-1
Irapuato	10-1	La Piedad	7-1	3-0
Poza Rica F.C.	3-0	Ciudad Victoria F.C.	1–0	2-0
Pachuca	0-1	Atlante F.C.	0-1	unk
Orizaba	4-2	Veracruz	4-1	0-1
Morelia	1-3	León	1-1	0-2
Laguna	2-0	Torreón	1-0	1-0
Tepic	3-6	Guadalajara	3-3	0-3
Texcoco F.C.	1-6	Toluca	1-1	0-5
Zacatepec	2-1	UNAM	1-0	1-1
Nacional	5-3	Zamora	3-1	2-2
Celaya	1-4	Oro	1-1	0-3

== Final round ==
Second round From March 5 to March 13
Monterrey	0	3	3
Nuevo León	0	1	1
Laguna	1	0	1
Poza Rica F.C.	1	1	2
Guadalajara	1	1	2
León	0	0	0
Nacional	2	0	2
Atlas (p)	0	2	2
América	0	2	2
Orizaba	0	1	1
Necaxa	3	2	5
Atlante F.C.	0	1	1
Irapuato	2	2	4
Oro	1	2	3
Zacatepec	2	0	2
Toluca	2	2	4

Quarterfinals; From March 21 to March 29
Monterrey	5	2	7
Poza Rica F.C.	2	4	6
Guadalajara	2	2	4
Atlas	0	2	2
América	0	3	3
Necaxa	0	2	2
Irapuato	1	0	1
Toluca	2	3	5

Semifinals; From April 14 to April 12
Monterrey	4	0	4
Guadalajara	1	2	3
América	3	0	3
Toluca	1	1	2

Final; April 19; Replay April 21
Monterrey	0	1	1(4)
América (p)	0	1	1(5)

=== Semifinals ===
First Leg

April 4, 1964	Monterrey	4 – 1	Guadalajara	Estadio Tecnológico, Monterrey, Nuevo León
	Raúl Chávez 4' 40'; Gustavo Cuenca 55'; Javan Marinho 82'		Francisco Jara 20'

April 5, 1964	América	3 – 1	Toluca	Estadio Olímpico Universitario, Mexico, DF
	Francisco Moacyr Santos 18' 64'; Martín Ibarreche 21'		Alfredo del Águila 87'

Second Leg

April 12, 1964	Guadalajara	2 – 0	Monterrey	Estadio Jalisco, Guadalajara, Jalisco
	Francisco Jara 28' 58'

April 12, 1964	Toluca	1 – 0	América	Estadio Nemesio Díez, Toluca, State of Mexico
	García Carrasco 45'

=== Final ===
April 19, 1964	América	0 - 0	Monterrey	Estadio Olímpico Universitario, Mexico, DF

Replay

April 21, 1964	América	1 – 1 (a.e.t.) (5 – 4 p)	Monterrey	Estadio Olímpico Universitario, Mexico, DF
	José González 63'		Salvador Vargas 16'
	Penalties
	Alfonso Portugal (penalty scored); Alfonso Portugal (penalty missed); Alfonso Portugal (penalty scored); Alfonso Portugal (penalty scored); Alfonso Portugal (penalty scored); Alfonso Portugal (penalty scored)		Raúl Chávez (penalty scored); Raúl Chávez (penalty missed); Raúl Chávez (penalty scored); Raúl Chávez (penalty scored); Raúl Chávez (penalty missed); Raúl Chávez (penalty scored)

Copa México 1963-64 Winners
América
3rd Title
