= Francisco Ulibarri =

Mexican footballer (born 1941)

Personal information
- Date of birth: 7 April 1941 (age 85)
- Place of birth: Mexico City, Mexico
- Height: 1.85 m (6 ft 1 in)
- Position: Half-back

Senior career*
| Years | Team | Apps | (Gls) |
| 1960–1963 | América | | |
| 1963–1966 | Cruz Azul | | |
| 1966–1968 | Pachuca | | |
| 1970–1972 | Rochester Lancers | 21 | (0) |

International career
| 1964 | Mexico | 3 | (0) |
- * Club domestic league appearances and goals

Francisco Ulibarri (born 7 April 1941) is a retired Mexican footballer. Nicknamed "Paco", he primarily played for Cruz Azul and Pachuca throughout the 1960s as well as playing for the Rochester Lancers abroad in the United States. He also represented his home country of Mexico for the 1964 CONCACAF Pre-Olympic Tournament.

== Club career ==
Ulibarri began his career with América for the 1960–61 season. His biggest success with his brief tenure with the Azulcremas came during the 1961–62 Mexican Primera División where the club achieved runners-up. He then played for Cruz Azul for the 1963–64 season where he would contribute towards the club's promotion to the Primera División in the following season. The following 1964–65 season saw him be a part of the first ever starting XI lineup in the top-flight of Mexican football under manager György Marik as he made his debut on 6 June 1964. He was also one of the first players to play for both América and Cruz Azul. The club would achieve a moderate 8th place with Ulibarri himself scoring an own goal against his former club of América on 30 August 1964. He then played for Pachuca for the 1966–67 Mexican Primera División and remained there for an additional season.

Following a season of absence, he decided to play abroad in the North American Soccer League for the Rochester Lancers in their 1970 season. He found immediate success in the tournament as he was a part of the winning squad for the 1970 North American Soccer League season and went on to play in the 1971 CONCACAF Champions' Cup, being the only team from the NASL to enjoy this honor. He performed well in that season, reaching the final stage of the tournament. He played two more games for the 1972 season before retiring that same season.

== International career ==
Ulibarri had represented Mexico during the 1964 CONCACAF Pre-Olympic Tournament where he played in all three games. Despite winning all three matches, he wasn't part of the final roster for the 1964 Summer Olympics.
