= Juan Jasso =

Mexican footballer (1926–2002)

Personal information
- Full name: Juan Jasso Martínez
- Date of birth: August 21, 1926
- Place of birth: Guadalajara, Jalisco, México
- Date of death: July 23, 2002 (aged 75)
- Place of death: Guadalajara, Jalisco, México
- Position: Midfielder

Youth career
- Guadalajara

Senior career*
| Years | Team | Apps | (Gls) |
| 1946-1966 | Guadalajara | 433 | |
- * Club domestic league appearances and goals

Juan Jasso Martínez (August 21, 1926 – July 23, 2002) was a Mexican footballer who played as a midfielder. He spent most of his playing career with Guadalajara, winning seven Primera División titles and making 545 appearances across all competitions, becoming the most capped player in the club's history.

== Career ==
Born on August 21, 1926, in Guadalajara, Jalisco, Jasso began playing football during his childhood. He later joined Guadalajara, where he developed his career as a professional football player.

At age nineteen, Jasso made his first-team debut on 17 March 1946 in an away match against San Sebastián de León. He went on to make 545 appearances across all competitions for Guadalajara, establishing himself as one of the club's most prominent players. Jasso played a key role during the Campeonísimo era and won fifteen official titles with the club, including seven Primera División championships.

His career as a player for the team concluded on October 23, 1966, in the match against Ciudad Madero, which ended 3–0. He scored the second goal from a penalty kick in the 32nd minute.

== Honours ==
Guadalajara

- Primera División de México: 1956–57, 1958–59, 1959–60, 1960–61, 1961–62, 1963–64, 1964–65
- Copa México: 1962–63
- Campeón de Campeones: 1957, 1959, 1960, 1961, 1964, 1965
- CONCACAF Champions League: 1962
