= Antonio Hernández (footballer) =

Mexican footballer (born 1955)

Personal information
- Date of birth: 1 April 1955 (age 71)

International career
Years	Team	Apps	(Gls)
- Mexico

Antonio Hernández (born 1 April 1955) is a Mexican former footballer. He competed in the men's tournament at the 1976 Summer Olympics.
