= 1967–68 Mexican Primera División season =

25th professional season of the top-flight football league in Mexico

Primera División de México
- Season: 1967–68
- Champions: Toluca (2nd title)
- Relegated: Morelia
- Champions' Cup: Toluca; Cruz Azul
- Matches: 240
- Goals: 635 (2.65 per match)

Statistics of the Primera División de México for the 1967–68 season.

== Overview ==
Pachuca was promoted to Primera División.

The season was contested by 16 teams, and Toluca won the championship and becomes second team to win consecutive championships.

Morelia was relegated to Segunda División.

=== Teams ===
Location of the 1967-68 Primera División teams

Team	City	Stadium
América	Mexico City	Azteca
Atlante	Mexico City	Azteca
Atlas	Guadalajara, Jalisco	Jalisco
Cruz Azul	Jasso, Hidalgo	10 de Diciembre
Guadalajara	Guadalajara, Jalisco	Jalisco
Irapuato	Irapuato, Guanajuato	Revolución
León	León, Guanajuato	León
Morelia	Morelia, Michoacán	Venustiano Carranza
Monterrey	Monterrey, Nuevo León	Tecnológico
Necaxa	Mexico City	Azteca
Nuevo León	Monterrey, Nuevo León	Tecnológico
Oro	Guadalajara, Jalisco	Jalisco
Pachuca	Pachuca, Hidalgo	Revolución Mexicana
Toluca	Toluca, State of Mexico	Luis Gutiérrez Dosal
UNAM	Mexico City	Ciudad de los Deportes
Veracruz	Veracruz, Veracruz	Parque Deportivo Veracruzano

== League standings ==
Pos	Team	Pld	W	D	L	GF	GA	GD	Pts	Qualification or relegation
1	Toluca	30	18	8	4	56	28	+28	44	Champions
2	UNAM	30	16	8	6	46	31	+15	40	
3	Veracruz	30	15	9	6	46	28	+18	39	
4	Necaxa	30	14	8	8	38	28	+10	36	
5	León	30	13	9	8	46	35	+11	35	
6	Guadalajara	30	13	8	9	51	35	+16	34	
7	Cruz Azul	30	12	10	8	36	30	+6	34	
8	Atlante	30	14	5	11	56	42	+14	33	
9	América	30	6	17	7	27	25	+2	29	
10	Atlas	30	8	10	12	33	39	−6	26	
11	Irapuato	30	7	11	12	34	41	−7	25	
12	Pachuca	30	8	8	14	37	52	−15	24	
13	Nuevo León	30	8	6	16	41	61	−20	22	
14	Monterrey	30	6	9	15	30	45	−15	21	
15	Oro	30	5	11	14	35	57	−22	21	
16	Morelia	30	6	5	19	23	58	−35	17	Relegated

1967–68 winners

2nd title

== Results ==
Home \ Away	AME	ATE	ATS	CAZ	GDL	IRA	LEO	MTY	MOR	NEC	JNL	ORO	PAC	TOL	UNM	VER
América	—	1–1	4–1	0–0	0–0	0–0	1–1	0–1	3–0	1–0	3–1	1–1	1–1	1–1	1–1	0–2
Atlante	3–0	—	3–2	1–2	4–0	3–1	0–1	1–1	5–0	3–1	3–0	1–1	2–1	2–3	0–1	3–0
Atlas	1–1	2–3	—	2–1	0–1	2–1	1–1	0–0	3–0	0–1	1–1	3–2	4–2	1–1	0–1	1–1
Cruz Azul	1–0	3–2	1–1	—	1–0	2–0	1–1	1–1	2–0	0–0	1–0	1–1	1–0	0–1	2–1	4–1
Guadalajara	0–0	2–1	2–0	2–1	—	4–1	2–1	1–1	2–2	2–1	10–2	3–2	5–1	0–1	1–1	0–0
Irapuato	0–0	1–2	2–1	2–1	0–0	—	1–1	2–1	0–2	0–0	3–2	3–1	3–3	1–2	1–1	1–1
León	0–0	3–2	3–0	2–0	4–1	0–2	—	1–0	4–1	1–2	1–0	5–1	3–0	0–4	2–1	0–0
Monterrey	1–0	1–2	0–1	1–1	1–1	0–0	1–2	—	0–2	0–0	2–4	2–0	3–2	3–2	1–2	3–2
Morelia	1–0	1–3	0–0	3–2	1–0	0–3	1–1	1–0	—	0–1	1–2	1–2	2–2	0–1	0–2	1–3
Necaxa	0–2	1–0	2–1	0–0	0–4	2–2	3–1	3–1	2–0	—	2–1	6–0	3–1	1–1	1–2	1–2
Nuevo León	2–1	0–1	2–1	1–1	0–2	2–0	0–4	3–0	6–1	2–0	—	1–3	2–2	1–2	1–3	1–1
Oro	1–2	3–3	0–1	1–1	1–4	1–1	0–0	3–2	1–0	0–1	1–1	—	1–1	0–3	3–1	1–1
Pachuca	1–1	1–0	0–2	0–1	2–1	2–1	2–0	2–1	2–1	0–2	1–1	3–2	—	1–0	1–2	1–1
Toluca	1–1	5–1	0–0	1–3	2–1	2–1	3–3	4–1	2–0	1–1	2–0	1–1	2–1	—	3–0	2–1
UNAM	0–0	1–1	1–1	4–1	1–0	2–1	2–0	1–1	1–1	0–1	6–2	1–0	2–0	2–1	—	2–1
Veracruz	2–2	3–0	2–0	1–0	3–0	1–0	3–0	1–0	3–0	0–0	2–0	3–1	2–1	0–2	3–1	—

Updated to match(es) played on 25 January 1968. Source: RSSSF
Legend: Blue = home team win; Yellow = draw; Red = away team win.
