= 1962–63 Copa México =

Tournament details
- Country: Mexico
- Teams: 14

Final positions
- Champions: Guadalajara (1st Title) (1st title)
- Runner-up: Club Atlante

Tournament statistics
- Matches played: 25

The 1962–63 Copa México also known as the Copa Presidente Adolfo López Mateos is the 47th staging of the Copa México, but the 21st staging in the professional era.

The competition started on April 20, 1963, and concluded on June 2, 1963, with the Final, held at the Estadio Olímpico Universitario in Mexico City, in which Guadalajara lifted the trophy for first time ever with a 2–1 victory over Club Atlante.

== Preliminary round ==
Team 1	Agg.	Team 2	1st leg	2nd leg
Monterrey	1–2	León	1–0	0-2
Guadalajara	4-3	Tampico	2-3	2-0
Toluca	2-3	Nacional	1–0	1-3
América	6-5	Morelia	5-3	1-2
Atlas	2-4	UNAM	1–2	1-2
Necaxa	2-4	Oro	0-2	2-2

== Final round ==
Quarterfinals; From May 5 to May 12
Guadalajara	2	4	6
Nacional	0	0	0
Oro (p)	3	1	4 (7)
Irapuato	4	0	4 (6)
UNAM	1	0	1
América	0	0	0
Atlante F.C.	0	3	3
León	1	0	1

Semifinals; From May 19 to May 26
Guadalajara	2	3	5
Oro	1	0	1
UNAM	2	0	2 (2)
Atlante F.C. (p)	2	0	3 (3)

Final; June 2
Guadalajara	2
Atlante F.C.	1

=== Quarterfinals ===
First Leg

May 5, 1963	Nacional	0 – 2	Guadalajara	Estadio Jalisco, Guadalajara, Jalisco
			Salvador Reyes 66'; Raúl Arellano 80'

May 5, 1963	Irapuato	4 – 3	Oro	Estadio Revolución, Irapuato, Guanajuato
	Federico Palato 10' 59'; Jaime Belmonte 49' 56'		Amaury Epaminondas 20'; Ramiro Navarro 66'; Neco 77'

May 5, 1963	UNAM	1 – 0	América	Estadio Olímpico Universitario, Mexico, DF
	Luis Moreira Saui 43'

May 5, 1963	León	1 – 0	Atlante F.C.	Estadio La Martinica, León, Guanajuato
	Miguel Rodríguez 33'

Second Leg

May 9, 1963	Guadalajara	4 – 0	Nacional	Estadio Jalisco, Guadalajara, Jalisco
	Isidoro Díaz 14' 45'; Javier Valdivia 34'; Héctor Hernández 90'

May 12, 1963	Oro	1 – 0 (a.e.t.) (7 – 6 p)	Irapuato	Estadio Jalisco, Guadalajara, Jalisco
	Ramiro Navarro 70'
	Penalties
	Gustavo Peña (penalty scored); Gustavo Peña (penalty scored); Gustavo Peña (penalty missed); Gustavo Peña (penalty scored); Gustavo Peña (penalty scored); Gustavo Peña (penalty missed); Gustavo Peña (penalty scored); Gustavo Peña (penalty scored); Gustavo Peña (penalty scored)		Antonio Hernández (penalty scored); Antonio Hernández (penalty scored); Antonio Hernández (penalty missed); Antonio Hernández (penalty scored); Antonio Hernández (penalty scored); Antonio Hernández (penalty missed); Antonio Hernández (penalty scored); Antonio Hernández (penalty scored); Antonio Hernández (penalty missed)

May 16, 1963	América	0 – 0	UNAM	Estadio Olímpico Universitario, Mexico, DF

May 12, 1963	Atlante F.C.	3 – 0	León	Estadio Olímpico Universitario, Mexico, DF
	Carlos Lara 30'; Manuel Orta 30'; Juan Iván Soto 69'

=== Semifinals ===
First Leg

May 19, 1963	Oro	1 – 2	Guadalajara	Estadio Jalisco, Guadalajara, Jalisco
	Jorge Rodríguez 15'		Salvador Reyes 25'; Raúl Arellano 75'

May 5, 1963	UNAM	2 – 2	Atlante F.C.	Estadio Olímpico Universitario, Mexico, DF
	Luis Regueiro 7'; José Antonio Rodríguez 87'		Juan Iván Soto 17'; Luis Alvarado 61'

Second Leg

May 26, 1963	Guadalajara	3 – 0	Oro	Estadio Jalisco, Guadalajara, Jalisco
	Agustín Moreno 24' 85'; Salvador Reyes 77'

May 26, 1963	Atlante F.C.	0 – 0 (a.e.t.) (3 – 2 p)	UNAM	Estadio Olímpico Universitario, Mexico, DF
	Penalties
	Juan Iván Soto (penalty scored); Juan Iván Soto (penalty scored); Juan Iván Soto (penalty scored)		Luis Moreira Saui (penalty scored); Luis Moreira Saui (penalty scored); Luis Moreira Saui (penalty missed)

=== Final ===
June 2, 1963

Guadalajara	2 – 1	Atlante F.C.
Isidoro Díaz 33'; Javier Barba 35'		Carlo Chavaño 75'

Estadio Olímpico Universitario, Mexico, DF

Copa México 1962-63 Winners
Guadalajara
1st Title
