= Carlos Carús =

Mexican footballer (1930–1997)

Personal information
- Full name: Carlos Carús Suárez
- Date of birth: 10 July 1930
- Place of birth: Veracruz, Mexico
- Date of death: 1997 (aged 66–67)
- Position: Forward

Senior career*
Years	Team	Apps	(Gls)
1952–1953	Atlético Veracruz		
1953–1962	Toluca	22	(11)

International career
- Mexico
- * Club domestic league appearances and goals

Carlos Carús Suárez was a Mexican football forward who played for Mexico in the 1954 FIFA World Cup. He played most of his professional career for Toluca.

== Career ==
Born in Veracruz, Carús started his professional career at the Mexican Segunda División with Atlético Veracruz in 1952. In 1953, he joined Toluca, the club had just earned his promotion to Primera División the previous season and was making its debut at the Mexican football top-level league. Carús played as a striker for Toluca from 1953 until 1962, when he retired and went back to his hometown.

Carús was part of the squad that represented Mexico in the 1954 FIFA World Cup, but he did not play any match.

Carús scored Toluca's first goal in Primera División on 9 August 1953, in the team's 2–1 victory against Atlante.

Carús died in 1997.

== Style of play ==
Carús was once defined as a player "with a lot of goal vision and agility to shoot, being a constant threat to the opponent's goal, because of his ability to shoot with both legs, to lose the mark and to dribble."

== Career statistics ==
Club	Season	League			Cup		Total	
Club	Season	Division	Apps	Goals	Apps	Goals	Apps	Goals
Toluca	1953–54	Primera División	22	11	6	2	28	13
Total			22	11	6	2	28	13
