= 1953–54 Copa México =

Tournament details
- Country: Mexico
- Teams: 12

Final positions
- Champions: América (1st title)
- Runners-up: Guadalajara

Tournament statistics
- Matches played: 40
- Goals scored: 140 (3.5 per match)
- Top goal scorer(s): Juan José Olivero (7 goals)

The 1953–54 Copa México was the 39th edition of the Copa México and the 12th staging of the tournament in the professional era.

The competition started on 20 March 1954 and concluded on 12 May 1954 with the final, held at the Estadio Ciudad de los Deportes in Mexico City, in which América defeated Guadalajara 3–2 in penalties to win the first cup title in the professional era for the club.

== Group stage ==
=== Group A ===
Team	Pld	W	D	L	GF	GA	GD	Pts	ATL	MAR	PUE	ORO
(Mexico City) Atlante	6	4	1	1	13	10	+3	9		1–2	3–2	3–2
(Morelos) Marte	6	1	4	1	9	9	0	6	1–2		1–1	3–3
Puebla	6	1	3	2	11	10	+1	5	2–3	0–0		4–1
(Jalisco) Oro	6	0	4	2	11	15	−4	4	1–1	2–2	2–2	

Source: RSSSF

=== Group B ===
Team	Pld	W	D	L	GF	GA	GD	Pts	AME	LEO	ATS	TOL
(Mexico City) América	6	3	2	1	11	11	0	8		2–2	3–2	3–2
(Guanajuato) León	6	3	1	2	13	6	+7	7	3–0		5–0	2–0
(Jalisco) Atlas	6	2	2	2	11	12	−1	6	1–1	2–0		5–2
(State of Mexico) Toluca	5	1	1	3	8	14	−6	3	1–2	2–1	1–1	

Source: RSSSF

=== Group C ===
Team	Pld	W	D	L	GF	GA	GD	Pts	GDL	ZAC	NEC	TAM
(Jalisco) Guadalajara	6	3	2	1	10	10	0	8		1–0	5–2	0–0
(Morelos) Zacatepec	6	2	3	1	11	7	+4	7	1–1		4–1	2–0
(Mexico City) Necaxa	6	1	3	2	16	17	−1	5	6–1	3–3		3–3
(Tamaulipas) Tampico	6	0	4	2	6	9	−3	4	1–2	1–1	1–1	

Source: RSSSF

== Final stage ==
Team	Pld	W	D	L	GF	GA	GD	Pts
(Mexico City) América	2	1	1	0	3	1	+2	3
(Jalisco) Guadalajara	2	1	1	0	4	2	+2	3
(Mexico City) Atlante	2	0	0	2	1	5	−4	0

Source: RSSSF
2 May 1954

América	2–0	Atlante
Fizel 65'; González Palmer 90'

Estadio Ciudad de los Deportes, Mexico City

6 May 1954

América	1–1	Guadalajara
Buendía 20'		Arellano 55'

Estadio Ciudad de los Deportes, Mexico City

9 May 1954

Atlante	1–3	Guadalajara
Jinich 51'		López 53'; Reyes 67', 80'

Estadio Ciudad de los Deportes, Mexico City

=== Playoff ===
12 May 1954

América	1–1	Guadalajara
Santiago 110' (pen.)		Arellano 92'
Penalties
Fizel (penalty scored); Fizel (penalty scored); Fizel (penalty scored)	3–2	(penalty scored) Jasso; (penalty missed) Jasso; (penalty scored) Jasso

Estadio Ciudad de los Deportes, Mexico City
Referee: Geoffrey Sunderland

== Top scorers ==
Rank	Player	Club	Goals
1	(Mexico) Juan José Olivero	León	7
2	(Argentina) Emilio Fizel	América	5
2	(Mexico) Adalberto López	Guadalajara	5
2	(Uruguay) Julio María Palleiro	Necaxa	5
5	(Mexico) Arnulfo Cortés	Oro	4
5	(Mexico) Rodolfo Franco	Atlas	4
5	(Mexico) Moisés Jinich	Atlante	4
5	(Mexico) José Luis Lamadrid	Necaxa	4
5	(Mexico) Mario Pérez	Marte	4
10	(Mexico) Raúl Arellano	Guadalajara	3
10	(Costa Rica) Edwin Cubero	Puebla	3
10	(Mexico) Alfredo del Águila	Necaxa	3
10	(Mexico) Mateo de la Tijera	Zacatepec	3
10	(Mexico) Luis Fernández	Atlante	3
10	(Mexico) Eduardo González Palmer	América	3
10	(Mexico) Salvador Reyes	Guadalajara	3
10	(Argentina) Norberto Rozas	Atlante	3
10	(Mexico) Salvador Saucedo	Puebla	3
