= Arlindo =

Arlindo is a given name. Notable people with the name include:

- Arlindo Barbeitos (1940–2021), Angolan poet
- Arlindo Chinaglia (born 1949), Brazilian politician and former President of the Chamber of Deputies of Brazil 2007–2009
- Arlindo Cruz (1958–2025), Brazilian musician, composer and singer, working in the genre of samba and pagode
- Arlindo Gomes Furtado (born 1949), the Roman Catholic bishop of the Diocese of Mindelo, Cape Verde, from 2003 to 2011
- Arlindo Pena Ben-Ben served as the military commander of UNITA in the Angolan Civil War
- Arlindo Lopes (born 1979), Brazilian actor
- Arlindo dos Santos Cruz (born 1940), Brazilian footballer
- Arlindo Galvão (born 1948), Brazilian footballer
- Arlindo Fazolin (born 1949), Brazilian footballer
