= Arlindo Barbeitos =

Angolan writer (1940–2021)

Arlindo do Carmo Pires Barbeitos
- Born: 24 December 1940
- Died: March 31, 2021 (aged 80); Luanda
- Occupation: Poet

Arlindo do Carmo Pires Barbeitos (24 December 1940 – 31 March 2021) was an Angolan poet.

Barbeitos was born in Catete, Bengo province, Angola. He studied from 1965 to 1969 in West Germany, then returned to Angola to teach at bases of the People's Movement for the Liberation of Angola (MPLA) during the struggle for independence.

== Works ==
- "por entre as margens da esperança"; "longe"; "borboletas de luz", Vozes Poéticas da Lusofonia
- Angola Angolê Angolema (1975)
- Nzoji (Sonho) (1979)
- Fiapos de Sonho (1990)
- Na Leveza do Luar Crescente (1998)
