= Guadalupe Díaz =

Mexican footballer and manager (born 1954)

Personal information
- Full name: José Guadalupe A. Díaz Rivera
- Date of birth: 16 March 1954 (age 72)
- Place of birth: León, Guanajuato, Mexico
- Position: Defender

Senior career*
Years	Team	Apps	(Gls)
- León
- Oaxtepec
- Puebla

Managerial career
- 1996: Atlético Celaya
- 2005–2006: Alacranes de Durango
- 2007: Petroleros de Salamanca
- 2010–2020: Atlético ECCA
- * Club domestic league appearances and goals

José Guadalupe A. Díaz Rivera (born March 16, 1954) is a Mexican football manager and former player. He was born in León, Guanajuato.
