= Alfonso Portugal =

Mexican footballer (1934-2016)

Personal information
- Full name: Alfonso Portugal Díaz
- Date of birth: 21 January 1934
- Place of birth: Mexico City, Mexico
- Date of death: 12 June 2016 (aged 82)
- Place of death: Atlixco, Puebla, Mexico
- Position: Defender

Senior career*
Years	Team	Apps	(Gls)
1955–1958	Necaxa		
1958–1959	Poza Rica		
1959–1966	América		
1966–1967	Pumas		
1967	Chicago Spurs	1	(0)

International career
1956–1961	Mexico	18	(0)

Managerial career
- 1970–1971: Pumas UNAM
- 1976: Cruz Azul
- 1979–1980: Atlético Español
- 1980: Atlas
- 1982–1983: Tigres UANL
- 1986–1987: Ángeles
- * Club domestic league appearances and goals

Alfonso Portugal Díaz (21 January 1934 – 12 June 2016) was a Mexican football player, who played as defender for Mexico in the 1958 FIFA World Cup.

== Career ==
Portugal captained Club América to the 1965–66 Mexican Primera División title. He also played for Club Necaxa. In 1967, he appeared in one match for the Chicago Spurs of the NPSL
