= 1970 Mexican Primera División season =

28th professional season of the top-flight football league in Mexico

Primera División de México
- Season: México 70
- Champions: Cruz Azul (2nd title)
- Champions' Cup: Cruz Azul
- Matches: 480
- Goals: 550 (1.15 per match)

In celebration of the 1970 World Cup (Mexico '70), the Mexican Football Federation held a tournament in two phases, before the World Cup (Feb. 4 – May 10) and after the World Cup (July 8 – Oct. 11).

Sixteen teams were seeded in two groups of eight teams, first four places of each group advanced to the "Championship Group" and the last four teams of each group played in a "Consolation Group".

Laguna last place of the 1969–70 season, was scheduled to play against the last place of the Consolation Group in a playoff relegation series, but due to expansion to 18 teams for the 1970–71 season this series was cancelled, there was no relegation.

== Overview ==
This tournament was contested by 16 teams, and Cruz Azul won the championship.

After this tournament Oro changed its name to Jalisco.

=== Teams ===
Location of the 1970 Primera División teams

Team	City	Stadium
América	Mexico City	Azteca
Atlante	Mexico City	Azteca
Atlas	Guadalajara, Jalisco	Jalisco
Cruz Azul	Jasso, Hidalgo	10 de Diciembre
Guadalajara	Guadalajara, Jalisco	Jalisco
Irapuato	Irapuato, Guanajuato	Irapuato
Laguna	Torreón, Coahuila	San Isidro
León	León, Guanajuato	León
Monterrey	Monterrey, Nuevo León	Tecnológico
Necaxa	Mexico City	Azteca
Oro	Guadalajara, Jalisco	Jalisco
Pachuca	Pachuca, Hidalgo	Revolución Mexicana
Toluca	Toluca, State of Mexico	Toluca 70
Torreón	Torreón, Coahuila	Revolución / Moctezuma (Note: In the First Phase, Torreón played its local games in Estadio Revolución. On Second Phase, the team moved to the new venue, Estadio Moctezuma, opened on July 2, 1970)
UNAM	Mexico City	Olímpico Universitario
Veracruz	Veracruz, Veracruz	Veracruzano

== First stage ==
=== Group 1 ===
Top four teams from each group advance to Championship Group.
The bottom four plays in Consolation Group.

Pos	Team	Pld	W	D	L	GF	GA	GD	Pts
1	Torreón	14	5	7	2	22	16	+6	17
2	Monterrey	14	5	6	3	16	21	−5	16
3	Guadalajara	14	7	1	6	27	18	+9	15
4	León	14	5	5	4	25	20	+5	15
5	UNAM	14	4	6	4	20	21	−1	14
6	Oro	14	6	2	6	15	18	−3	14
7	Veracruz	14	5	3	6	25	23	+2	13
8	Necaxa	14	1	6	7	11	24	−13	8

==== Results ====
Home \ Away	GDL	LEO	MTY	NEC	ORO	TOR	UNM	VER
Guadalajara	—	4–0	4–0	2–1	0–2	1–1	4–1	2–0
León	2–1	—	6–0	4–2	1–1	0–0	2–2	3–0
Monterrey	1–0	3–1	—	0–0	1–1	1–1	1–1	1–0
Necaxa	0–4	0–1	1–1	—	3–0	1–1	0–0	2–2
Oro	0–1	1–0	0–2	1–0	—	2–1	2–1	2–0
Torreón	3–1	2–2	1–2	0–0	3–1	—	2–1	2–0
UNAM	2–1	2–2	4–2	1–0	1–0	2–2	—	1–2
Veracruz	5–2	2–1	1–1	6–0	4–2	2–3	1–1	—

Updated to match(es) played on 10 May 1970. Source: RSSSF
Legend: Blue = home team win; Yellow = draw; Red = away team win.

=== Group 2 ===
Pos	Team	Pld	W	D	L	GF	GA	GD	Pts
1	Toluca	14	7	3	4	21	12	+9	17
2	Pachuca	14	6	4	4	15	9	+6	16
3	Cruz Azul	14	7	2	5	13	13	0	16
4	Atlas	14	6	4	4	17	19	−2	16
5	América	14	6	2	6	16	15	+1	14
6	Laguna	14	4	4	6	13	19	−6	12
7	Atlante	14	2	7	5	12	17	−5	11
8	Irapuato	14	4	2	8	15	18	−3	10

==== Results ====
Home \ Away	AME	ATE	ATS	CAZ	IRA	LAG	PAC	TOL
América	—	3–1	1–2	3–0	2–0	2–1	0–0	0–1
Atlante	1–1	—	0–0	0–2	0–2	1–1	1–0	1–1
Atlas	1–0	3–2	—	2–1	2–1	2–1	0–2	1–1
Cruz Azul	0–1	2–1	1–0	—	1–0	1–0	2–1	0–1
Irapuato	1–2	0–2	2–2	1–2	—	4–2	0–0	1–0
Laguna	1–0	0–0	1–1	1–1	0–2	—	1–0	2–1
Pachuca	3–1	1–1	2–0	0–0	2–1	0–1	—	2–0
Toluca	3–0	1–1	4–1	2–0	1–0	4–1	1–2	—

Updated to match(es) played on 10 May 1970. Source: RSSSF
Legend: Blue = home team win; Yellow = draw; Red = away team win.

== Second stage ==
=== Championship group ===
Pos	Team	Pld	W	D	L	GF	GA	GD	Pts	Qualification
1	Cruz Azul	14	10	1	3	26	15	+11	21	Champions
2	Guadalajara	14	7	5	2	21	11	+10	19	
3	León	14	7	4	3	22	15	+7	18	
4	Toluca	14	7	3	4	26	15	+11	17	
5	Pachuca	14	6	1	7	21	24	−3	13	
6	Atlas	14	3	4	7	13	23	−10	10	
7	Monterrey	14	2	5	7	13	20	−7	9	
8	Torreón	14	2	1	11	12	31	−19	5	

==== Results ====
Home \ Away	ATS	CAZ	GDL	LEO	MTY	PAC	TOL	TOR
Atlas	—	1–3	1–1	3–2	0–3	1–2	0–2	2–1
Cruz Azul	1–0	—	1–0	2–4	1–0	2–0	1–0	6–1
Guadalajara	1–1	2–1	—	1–1	1–0	4–1	2–1	3–0
León	3–1	0–1	0–0	—	3–2	2–1	0–1	3–1
Monterrey	1–1	1–1	2–2	0–0	—	1–2	0–0	0–3
Pachuca	2–0	3–1	0–3	0–1	0–2	—	3–2	3–0
Toluca	1–1	2–3	2–0	1–1	4–0	4–3	—	3–1
Torreón	0–1	1–2	0–1	1–2	2–1	1–1	0–3	—

Updated to match(es) played on 11 October 1970. Source: RSSSF
Legend: Blue = home team win; Yellow = draw; Red = away team win.

=== Consolation group ===
Pos	Team	Pld	W	D	L	GF	GA	GD	Pts
9	UNAM	14	7	3	4	14	8	+6	17
10	Laguna	14	6	5	3	17	12	+5	17
11	Veracruz	14	6	4	4	16	13	+3	16
12	Atlante	14	4	7	3	16	13	+3	15
13	Irapuato	14	5	5	4	15	17	−2	15
14	América	14	4	6	4	13	12	+1	14
15	Necaxa	14	3	5	6	12	17	−5	11
16	Oro	14	2	3	9	10	21	−11	7

==== Results ====
Home \ Away	AME	ATE	IRA	LAG	NEC	ORO	UNM	VER
América	—	0–0	0–1	0–0	4–0	2–1	1–0	2–0
Atlante	2–2	—	4–0	3–2	0–0	0–1	0–2	3–1
Irapuato	1–1	1–1	—	1–0	1–0	3–0	1–1	0–2
Laguna	0–0	0–0	2–1	—	1–1	2–0	1–1	3–1
Necaxa	1–0	1–1	2–2	2–3	—	2–0	1–2	1–2
Oro	1–1	0–1	3–1	1–2	1–1	—	1–2	1–1
UNAM	2–0	2–0	0–1	1–1	0–1	1–0	—	0–1
Veracruz	3–0	1–1	1–0	0–1	1–0	2–0	0–0	—

Updated to match(es) played on 11 October 1970. Source: RSSSF
Legend: Blue = home team win; Yellow = draw; Red = away team win.

1970 winners

2nd title

== Top scorers ==
Player	Nationality	Goals	Club
Sergio Anaya	Mexico	16	León
Octavio Muciño	Mexico	14	Cruz Azul
Luis Estrada	Mexico	14	León
Jesús Zárate Pérez	Mexico	12	Pachuca
Eduardo Chavarría	Costa Rica	12	Torreón
José Rodríguez Sevilla	Mexico	11	Atlas
Tibor Vigh	Canada	10	Laguna
Pedro Damián Álvarez	Mexico	11	Veracruz
Mariano Ubiracy	Brazil	8	Veracruz
José Luis Guerrero	Mexico	8	Cruz Azul
Juan Manuel Olague	Mexico	8	Guadalajara
