= 1969 CONCACAF Champions' Cup =

5th edition of premier club football tournament organized by CONCACAF

Copa de Campeones Concacaf

Tournament details
- Dates: 25 April – 30 September
- Teams: 10 (from 9 associations)

Final positions
- Champions: (Mexico) Cruz Azul (1st title)
- Runners-up: (Guatemala) Comunicaciones
- Third place: (Costa Rica) Saprissa

Tournament statistics
- Matches played: 18
- Goals scored: 53 (2.94 per match)

The 1969 CONCACAF Champions' Cup was the 5th edition of the annual international club football competition held in the CONCACAF region (North America, Central America and the Caribbean), the CONCACAF Champions' Cup. It determined that year's football club champion in the CONCACAF region.

The tournament was played by 10 teams of 9 nations: Netherlands Antilles, Bermuda, El Salvador, Haiti, Guatemala, Honduras, Mexico, Nicaragua, Costa Rica. It was played from 25 April to 30 September 1969 under the home/away match system and for the first time, the teams were not split into zones, playing in a straight round system.

Cruz Azul from Mexico won the final after beating Guatemalan club Comunicaciones 1–0 in the second leg, becoming CONCACAF champion for the first time in its history.

== First round ==
25 April 1969 1st leg	Saprissa (Costa Rica)	4–0	(Honduras) Motagua	San José, Costa Rica
20:17 (UTC−06:00)	Luís Aguilar 19'; Fernando Hernández 60'; Eduardo Umaña 82'; Eduardo Chavarría 86'		Nil	Stadium: Estadio Nacional; Attendance: 15,000; Referee: Valentín Gazo (NCA)

1 May 1969 2nd leg	Motagua (Honduras)	1–1	(Costa Rica) Saprissa	Tegucigalpa, Honduras
(UTC−06:00)	Dagoberto Díaz 15' (o.g.)		19' (o.g.) Navarro	Stadium: Estadio Tiburcio Carías Andino; Referee: Clemente Cayez (SLV)

- Saprissa won 5–1 on aggregate score.

11 May 1969 1st leg	Comunicaciones (Guatemala)	1–1	(Nicaragua) CD UCA	Guatemala City, Guatemala
(UTC−06:00)	TBD		TBD	Stadium: Estadio Mateo Flores

13 May 1969 2nd leg	CD UCA (Nicaragua)	0–3	(Guatemala) Comunicaciones	Guatemala City, Guatemala
(UTC−06:00)	Nil		TBD; TBD; TBD	Stadium: Estadio Mateo Flores

- Comunicaciones won 4–1 on aggregate score.

18 May 1969 1st leg	Águila (El Salvador)	3–1	(Netherlands Antilles) Jong Colombia	San Salvador, El Salvador
(UTC−06:00)	Juan Ramon Martinez; Felix Pineda		Franklin Victoria	Stadium: Estadio Nacional De la Flor Blanca

20 May 1969 2nd leg	Jong Colombia (Netherlands Antilles)	2–2	(El Salvador) Águila	San Salvador, El Salvador
(UTC−06:00)	Hubert Martina		Rudy Sobalvarro; Carlos Goncalvez	Stadium: Estadio Nacional De la Flor Blanca

- Águila won 5–3 on aggregate score.

14 June 1969 1st leg	Somerset Trojans (Bermuda)	1–1	(Haiti) Violette	Hamilton, Bermuda
(UTC−06:00)	TBD		TBD

16 June 1969 2nd leg	Violette (Haiti)	0–5	(Bermuda) Somerset Trojans	Hamilton, Bermuda
(UTC−06:00)	Nil		TBD; TBD; TBD; TBD; TBD

- Somerset Cricket won 6–1 on aggregate score.

== Second round ==
12 June 1969 1st leg	Toluca (Mexico)	0–0	(Mexico) Cruz Azul	Toluca, Mexico
(UTC−06:00)	Nil		Nil	Stadium: Estadio Nemesio Díez

18 June 1969 2nd leg	Cruz Azul (Mexico)	0–1	(Mexico) Toluca	Mexico City, Mexico
(UTC−06:00)	Nil		Pereda 5'	Stadium: Estadio Olímpico de la Ciudad de los Deportes

- Toluca won 1–0 on aggregate score. Toluca were disqualified for the undue alignment of three players; Cruz Azul advanced.

22 June 1969 1st leg	Águila (El Salvador)	2–5	(Guatemala) Comunicaciones	San Salvador, El Salvador
(UTC−06:00)	Goal		Hernán Godoy; Hugo Peña; Héctor Tambasco	Stadium: Estadio Nacional Jorge "Mágico" González

29 June 1969 2nd leg	Comunicaciones (Guatemala)	2–2	(El Salvador) Águila	Guatemala City, Guatemala
(UTC−06:00)	Hernán Godoy; Julio Rodas		Félix Pineda; Rudy Sobalbarro	Stadium: Estadio Mateo Flores

- Comunicaciones won 7–4 on aggregate score.

24 July 1969 1st leg	Saprissa (Costa Rica)	3–0	(Bermuda) Somerset Trojans	San José, Costa Rica
(UTC−06:00)	Goal		Nil	Stadium: Estadio Nacional

27 July 1969 2nd leg	Somerset Trojans (Bermuda)	0–4	(Costa Rica) Saprissa	San José, Costa Rica
(UTC−06:00)	Nil		Goal	Stadium: Estadio Nacional

- Saprissa won 7–0 on aggregate score.

== Semifinal ==
31 August 1969 1st leg	Saprissa (Costa Rica)	2–2	(Mexico) Cruz Azul	San José, Costa Rica
(UTC−06:00)	Chavarría 63'; Hernández 75'		Victorino 43'; Pulido 72'	Stadium: Estadio Nacional

9 September 1969 2nd leg	Cruz Azul (Mexico)	2–1	(Costa Rica) Saprissa	Mexico City, Mexico
(UTC−06:00)	Guerrero 32'; Flores 54'		Chavarría 56'	Stadium: Estadio Olímpico de la Ciudad de los Deportes; Attendance: 35,000

- Cruz Azul won 4–3 on aggregate score.
- Comunicaciones received a bye to the final.

== Final ==
=== First leg ===
1969 CONCACAF Champions' Cup Final
18 September 1969
(UTC−06:00)
First leg

Comunicaciones (Guatemala)	0–0	(Mexico) Cruz Azul
	Report

Estadio Mateo Flores, Guatemala City
Attendance: 30,000

=== Second leg ===
30 September 1969
(UTC−06:00)
Second leg

Cruz Azul (Mexico)	1–0	(Guatemala) Comunicaciones
Alejándrez 82'	Report

Estadio Ciudad de los Deportes, Mexico City
Attendance: 30,000
- Cruz Azul won 1–0 on aggregate score.

Team details

Cruz Azul
Comunicaciones

GK	(Mexico) Roberto Alatorre
DF	(Mexico) Juan Alejándrez
DF	(Mexico) Gustavo Peña
DF	(Mexico) Javier Guzmán
DF	(Mexico) Javier Sánchez	(substituted off) a'
MF	(Mexico) Jesús Prado	(substituted off) b'
MF	(Mexico) Antonio Munguía
FW	(Mexico) Héctor Pulido
FW	(Mexico) Fernando Bustos
FW	(Mexico) Lupe Flores
FW	(Mexico) Rafael Hernández
Substitutions:
FW	(Mexico) Cesáreo Victorino	(substituted in) a'
MF	(Mexico) Marco Arévalo	(substituted in) b'
Manager:
(Mexico) Raúl Cárdenas

GK	(Guatemala) Julio Rodolfo García
DF	(Guatemala) Henry Stokes
DF	(Argentina) Luis Contini
DF	(Guatemala) Erwin Torres
DF	(Guatemala) Luis Villavicencio
MF	(Guatemala) Hugo Torres
MF	(Argentina) Jorge L. López
FW	(Guatemala) Nelson Melgar	Substituted off
FW	(Argentina) Héctor Tambasco
FW	(Chile) Hernán Godoy
FW	(Guatemala) Enrique Mendoza
Substitutions:
FW	(Guatemala) Lugo	Substituted in
Manager:
(Guatemala) Enrique Wellam

CONCACAF Champions' Cup
1969 Champion
(Mexico)
Cruz Azul
First title
