= Rubini (footballer) =

Brazilian footballer

Personal information
- Full name: Olinto Sampaio Rubini
- Date of birth: 1934
- Place of birth: Porto Feliz, Brazil
- Date of death: 18 September 2012 (aged 77–78)
- Place of death: Brazil
- Position: Center forward

Senior career*
Years	Team	Apps	(Gls)
–1957	Ituano		
1957–1961	São Bento		
1961	Toronto Roma		
1961–1963	Nacional		
1963–1964	Oro		
1964–1968	Monterrey		
1968–1969	Laguna		
- * Club domestic league appearances and goals

Olinto Sampaio Rubini commonly known as Rubini (1934 – 18 September 2012) was a professional footballer who played in the Campeonato Paulista and Mexican Primera División.

== Career ==
Born in Porto Feliz, Rubini played as a center forward. He began his career with local side Atlético Ituano, helping the club with the Campeonato Paulista Série A3 title in 1954 and 1955. Rubini signed with Paulista second division side Esporte Clube São Bento in 1957.

In the summer of 1961, Rubini played with Toronto Roma of the National Soccer League. Rubini was instrumental in having Toronto Roma win the league championship. He moved to Mexico where he would play in the Primera División for nearly a decade. Initially, he signed with Nacional de Guadalajara, before joining rivals Oro de Guadalajara two seasons later. He scored 17 league goals for Oro in the 1963–64 season. Rubini joined C.F. Monterrey in 1964, scoring 20 league goals in his first season with the club. He played for Monterrey until 1968, when he joined Laguna.

== Personal ==
Rubini died aged 78 in September 2012.
