= Carlos María Morales =

Uruguayan footballer (born 1970)

Personal information
- Full name: Carlos María Morales Maeso
- Date of birth: 1 March 1970 (age 56)
- Place of birth: Montevideo, Uruguay
- Height: 1.76 m (5 ft 9 in)
- Position: Forward

Team information
- Current team: Toluca U-21 (Manager)

Senior career*
Years	Team	Apps	(Gls)
1990–1991	River Plate (URU)	?	(?)
1992	O'Higgins	?	(?)
1993–1994	Temuco	55	(26)
1995	Unión Española	11	(6)
1995–1997	Toluca	65	(18)
1997	San Luis	37	(23)
1998	LDU Quito	23	(10)
1999–2002	Toluca	107	(45)
2002–2004	Atlas	86	(33)
2005	Tecos	30	(6)
2006	Puebla	17	(0)
2006	Everton de Viña del Mar	6	(0)
2006	River Plate (URU)	13	(5)
2007	Defensor Sporting	43	(13)
2008	Danubio	9	(4)
2008	Montevideo Wanderers	10	(1)

International career
2001	Uruguay	7	(1)

Managerial career
- 2010–2011: River Plate (Montevideo)
- 2013: San Luis
- 2014–2016: Miramar Misiones
- 2018–2022: León Reserves and Academy
- 2023–: Toluca Reserves and Academy
- 2023: Toluca (Interim)
- * Club domestic league appearances and goals

Carlos María Morales Maeso (born 1 March 1970 in Montevideo) is a former Uruguayan footballer.

== Club career ==
Carlos María Morales Maeso was born on 1 March 1970 in Montevideo, Uruguay. Morales spent most of his career in Uruguay, Chile and Mexico, notably playing for River Plate (URU) in the Primera División Uruguaya as well as Toluca and Atlas in the Primera División de México.

== International career ==
Morales made seven appearances for the senior Uruguay national football team during 2001.

== Honours ==
L.D.U. Quito

- Ecuadorian Serie A: 1998

Toluca

- Mexican Primera División: Verano 1999, Verano 2000

Defensor Sporting

- Uruguayan Primera División: 2007–08
