= 1953–54 Mexican Primera División season =

11th professional season of the top-flight football league in Mexico

Primera División de México
- Season: 1953–54
- Champions: Marte (1st title)
- Relegated: Atlas
- Matches: 132
- Goals: 461 (3.49 per match)

Statistics of the Primera División de México for the 1953–54 season.

== Overview ==
Toluca was promoted to Primera División.

The season was contested by 12 teams, and Marte won the championship.

Atlas was relegated to Segunda División.

=== Teams ===
Location of the 1952-53 Primera División teams

Team	City	Stadium
América	Mexico City	Ciudad de los Deportes
Atlante	Mexico City	Ciudad de los Deportes
Atlas	Guadalajara, Jalisco	Parque Oblatos
Guadalajara	Guadalajara, Jalisco	Parque Oblatos
León	León, Guanajuato	La Martinica
Marte	Cuernavaca, Morelos	Deportivo Morelos
Necaxa	Mexico City	Ciudad de los Deportes
Oro	Guadalajara, Jalisco	Parque Oblatos
Puebla	Puebla, Puebla	Parque El Mirador
C.D. Tampico	Tampico, Tamaulipas	Tampico
Toluca	Toluca, State of Mexico	Héctor Barraza
Zacatepec	Zacatepec, Morelos	Campo del Ingenio

== League standings ==
Pos	Team	Pld	W	D	L	GF	GA	GD	Pts	Qualification or relegation
1	Marte	22	11	4	7	34	27	+7	26	Champions
2	Oro	22	12	1	9	57	45	+12	25	
3	Puebla	22	8	9	5	31	29	+2	25	
4	Tampico	22	9	5	8	49	45	+4	23	
5	Toluca	22	8	7	7	35	34	+1	23	
6	Guadalajara	22	9	4	9	46	34	+12	22	
7	Necaxa	22	9	4	9	39	43	−4	22	
8	León	22	10	1	11	36	31	+5	21	
9	América	22	7	6	9	37	45	−8	20	
10	Zacatepec	22	9	2	11	34	44	−10	20	
11	Atlante	22	7	5	10	29	37	−8	19	
12	Atlas	22	7	4	11	34	47	−13	18	Relegated

1953–54 winners

1st title

== Results ==
Home \ Away	AME	ATE	ATS	GDL	LEO	MAR	NEC	ORO	PUE	TAM	TOL	ZAC
América	—	5–2	3–1	0–2	2–1	2–1	1–3	3–0	1–1	3–3	1–2	4–0
Atlante	3–0	—	1–0	2–1	0–1	0–0	1–3	1–2	4–2	1–0	0–0	2–0
Atlas	2–1	1–1	—	1–1	1–0	1–5	5–2	2–6	2–2	2–3	2–0	1–2
Guadalajara	1–0	2–2	5–1	—	3–2	0–1	3–2	2–3	4–0	7–1	1–2	1–2
León	5–0	2–0	4–2	1–3	—	0–2	1–2	3–1	1–0	3–0	2–0	3–0
Marte	1–1	2–0	0–1	2–1	2–1	—	2–1	2–1	1–4	3–4	0–2	1–1
Necaxa	1–1	3–1	3–2	0–0	0–2	3–1	—	2–3	0–0	5–4	2–1	2–4
Oro	6–2	4–3	1–3	3–4	4–0	0–2	2–0	—	1–3	1–1	4–1	5–1
Puebla	2–2	1–1	0–2	1–0	2–1	0–0	1–4	4–2	—	0–0	3–1	1–0
Tampico	5–1	1–2	4–0	3–2	4–1	2–4	4–0	1–3	1–1	—	1–1	1–2
Toluca	1–1	2–1	2–2	2–2	1–1	2–0	3–0	2–3	1–1	2–3	—	3–1
Zacatepec	2–3	5–1	1–0	3–1	2–1	0–2	1–1	3–2	0–2	1–3	3–4	—

Updated to match(es) played on 6 February 1954. Source: RSSSF
Legend: Blue = home team win; Yellow = draw; Red = away team win.
