= Francisco Jara =

Mexican footballer (1941–2024)

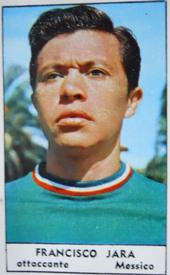
- Jara at the 1966 FIFA World Cup

Personal information
- Full name: Francisco Jara Garibay
- Date of birth: 3 February 1941
- Place of birth: Guadalajara, Jalisco, Mexico
- Date of death: 2 February 2024 (aged 82)
- Place of death: Guadalajara, Jalisco, Mexico
- Position: Forward

Senior career*
Years	Team	Apps	(Gls)
1960–1971	Guadalajara		(68)

International career
1963–1968	Mexico	9	(0)
- * Club domestic league appearances and goals

Francisco Jara Garibay (3 February 1941 – 2 February 2024) was a Mexican footballer who played as a forward for Mexico at the 1966 FIFA World Cup. He also played for Guadalajara. Jara died on 2 February 2024.
