= 1964–65 Copa México =

Tournament details
- Country: Mexico
- Teams: 16

Final positions
- Champions: América (4th title)
- Runners-up: Morelia

Tournament statistics
- Matches played: 53
- Top goal scorer(s): Carlos Miloc (6 goals)

The 1964–65 Copa México was the 49th edition of the Copa México and the 23rd staging in the professional era.

The competition started on 7 January 1965 and concluded on 7 March 1965 with the Final, held at the Estadio Olímpico Universitario in Mexico City, in which América defeated Morelia 4–0 to win the fourth cup title for the club.

== Group stage ==
=== Group 1 ===
Team	Pld	W	D	L	GF	GA	GD	Pts	AME	UNM	TOL	ZAC
(Mexico City) América	6	2	3	1	9	7	+2	7		2–3	2–0	1–0
(Mexico City) UNAM	6	3	1	2	10	10	0	7	2–2		0–1	3–2
(State of Mexico) Toluca	6	2	2	2	4	5	−1	6	0–0	1–2		2–1
(Morelos) Zacatepec	6	1	2	3	7	8	−1	4	2–2	2–0	0–0	

Source: RSSSF

=== Group 2 ===
Team	Pld	W	D	L	GF	GA	GD	Pts	MOR	IRA	NAC	ORO
(Michoacán) Morelia	6	4	1	1	13	8	+5	9		4–2	3–1	1–0
(Guanajuato) Irapuato	6	3	1	2	12	12	0	7	2–1		2–0	2–2
(Jalisco) Nacional	6	2	0	4	10	11	−1	4	1–2	3–1		1–2
(Jalisco) Oro	6	1	2	3	9	13	−4	4	2–2	2–3	1–4	

Source: RSSSF

=== Group 3 ===
Team	Pld	W	D	L	GF	GA	GD	Pts	GDL	ATS	MTY	LEO
(Jalisco) Guadalajara	6	3	1	2	11	12	−1	7		2–1	1–3	2–0
(Jalisco) Atlas	6	2	2	2	8	5	+3	6	5–1		0–0	0–1
(Nuevo León) Monterrey	6	2	2	2	7	6	+1	6	0–2	0–1		1–1
(Guanajuato) León	6	1	3	2	7	10	−3	5	3–3	1–1	1–3	

Source: RSSSF

=== Group 4 ===
Team	Pld	W	D	L	GF	GA	GD	Pts	CAZ	NEC	VER	ATL
(Hidalgo (state)) Cruz Azul	6	3	2	1	8	6	+2	8		1–2	2–1	3–2
(Mexico City) Necaxa	6	2	2	2	6	7	−1	6	0–0		1–1	0–2
Veracruz	6	1	3	2	7	6	+1	5	1–1	3–0		1–1
(Mexico City) Atlante	6	2	1	3	6	8	−2	5	0–1	0–3	1–0	

Source: RSSSF

== Knockout stage ==
=== Semifinals ===
Team 1	Agg.	Team 2	1st leg	2nd leg
Morelia	2–1	Guadalajara	0–0	2–1
América	3–2	Cruz Azul	1–0	2–2

=== Final ===
7 March 1965

América	4–0	Morelia
Fragoso 21', 50'; Vavá 53', ?'

Estadio Olímpico Universitario, Mexico City
Referee: Fernando Buergo

1964–65 Copa México Winners
América
4th Title

== Top goalscorers ==
Rank	Player	Club	Goals
1	(Uruguay) Carlos Miloc	Morelia	6
2	(Mexico) J. A. Pérez	Nacional	4
3	(Mexico) Raúl Arellano	Cruz Azul	3
3	(Brazil) Arlindo	América	3
3	(Mexico) Jaime Belmonte	Irapuato	3
3	(Mexico) Enrique Borja	UNAM	3
3	(Mexico) Ernesto Cisneros	Zacatepec	3
3	(Brazil) Francisco Moacyr	América	3
3	(Mexico) Eduardo Reyes	Oro	3
3	(Brazil) Rubini	Monterrey	3
3	(Uruguay) Ademar Saccone	Irapuato	3
3	(Mexico) Fernando Vera	Guadalajara	3
3	(Brazil) Zague	América	3
