= Raúl Arellano (footballer, born 1935) =

Mexican footballer

Personal information
- Full name: Raúl Arellano Villegas
- Date of birth: 28 February 1935
- Place of birth: Guadalajara, Jalisco, Mexico
- Date of death: 12 October 1997 (aged 62)
- Position: Forward

Senior career*
Years	Team	Apps	(Gls)
- C.D. Guadalajara

International career
1953–1960	Mexico	10	(3)
- * Club domestic league appearances and goals

Raúl Arellano Villegas (28 February 1935 – 12 October 1997) was a Mexican football forward who played for Mexico in the 1954 FIFA World Cup. He also played for C.D. Guadalajara.
