= 1965–66 Mexican Primera División season =

23rd professional season of the top-flight football league in Mexico

Primera División de México
- Season: 1965–66
- Champions: América (1st title)
- Relegated: Zacatepec
- Matches: 240
- Goals: 681 (2.84 per match)

Statistics of the Primera División de México for the 1965–66 season.

== Overview ==
Ciudad Madero was promoted to Primera División.

The season was contested by 16 teams, and America won the championship.

Zacatepec was relegated to Segunda División.

=== Teams ===
Location of the 1965-66 Primera División teams

Team	City	Stadium
América	Mexico City	Olímpico Universitario
Atlante	Mexico City	Olímpico Universitario
Atlas	Guadalajara, Jalisco	Jalisco
Ciudad Madero	Ciudad Madero, Tamaulipas	Tampico
Cruz Azul	Jasso, Hidalgo	10 de Diciembre
Guadalajara	Guadalajara, Jalisco	Jalisco
Irapuato	Irapuato, Guanajuato	Revolución
León	León, Guanajuato	La Martinica
Morelia	Morelia, Michoacán	Venustiano Carranza
Monterrey	Monterrey, Nuevo León	Tecnológico
Necaxa	Mexico City	Olímpico Universitario
Oro	Guadalajara, Jalisco	Jalisco
Toluca	Toluca, State of Mexico	Luis Gutiérrez Dosal
UNAM	Mexico City	Olímpico Universitario
Veracruz	Veracruz, Veracruz	Parque Deportivo Veracruzano
Zacatepec	Zacatepec, Morelos	Agustín "Coruco" Díaz

== League standings ==
Pos	Team	Pld	W	D	L	GF	GA	GD	Pts	Qualification or relegation
1	América (C)	30	18	6	6	56	28	+28	42	Champions
2	Atlas	30	17	6	7	55	31	+24	40	
3	Guadalajara	30	17	6	7	47	34	+13	40	
4	Monterrey	30	13	7	10	41	37	+4	33	
5	Atlante	30	13	7	10	43	47	−4	33	
6	UNAM	30	13	5	12	51	50	+1	31	
7	Necaxa	30	10	9	11	35	40	−5	29	
8	Morelia	30	13	3	14	46	61	−15	29	
9	León	30	10	8	12	34	37	−3	28	
10	Irapuato	30	11	5	14	41	39	+2	27	
11	Veracruz	30	12	3	15	40	41	−1	27	
12	Toluca	30	7	12	11	39	37	+2	26	
13	Cruz Azul	30	7	12	11	49	54	−5	26	
14	Ciudad Madero	30	7	10	13	39	48	−9	24	
15	Oro	30	6	12	12	36	50	−14	24	
16	Zacatepec	30	7	7	16	29	47	−18	21	Relegated

(C) Champions

1965–66 winners

1st title

== Results ==
Home \ Away	AME	ATE	ATS	CAZ	GDL	IRA	LEO	CMA	MTY	MOR	NEC	ORO	TOL	UNM	VER	ZAC
América	—	2–2	2–0	4–1	2–1	0–2	2–0	4–1	2–0	1–0	2–3	1–0	0–3	0–0	2–0	4–0
Atlante	0–2	—	3–2	1–0	1–2	0–1	2–0	3–2	1–0	0–1	0–1	0–0	1–0	4–1	4–2	1–0
Atlas	0–2	4–1	—	4–3	2–0	1–0	1–0	1–0	4–0	6–2	2–1	3–0	0–0	0–2	2–0	3–0
Cruz Azul	2–2	1–1	0–1	—	1–3	0–0	0–1	3–3	3–2	1–2	2–1	2–2	3–3	1–1	2–1	2–2
Guadalajara	2–0	2–0	0–2	1–7	—	0–2	4–2	0–0	1–0	4–0	4–0	1–1	0–0	3–0	1–0	2–0
Irapuato	0–2	3–0	0–1	1–2	0–1	—	1–3	0–0	1–1	6–3	1–1	2–2	1–0	1–0	1–2	1–2
León	2–1	1–1	1–1	1–1	0–1	1–0	—	4–1	0–0	3–0	1–0	4–1	0–0	2–3	2–1	1–1
Ciudad Madero	0–0	5–0	1–1	2–2	1–2	3–2	3–0	—	0–0	0–1	1–0	3–1	1–1	1–2	1–0	1–1
Monterrey	1–5	2–2	5–1	2–1	4–1	2–0	0–0	2–0	—	1–0	3–3	1–1	2–1	2–0	2–1	2–1
Morelia	3–5	4–2	0–6	5–1	2–5	0–2	1–0	2–0	3–1	—	0–1	0–2	0–0	3–1	2–1	4–2
Necaxa	1–1	1–1	1–1	1–4	1–1	3–1	1–0	2–3	0–1	1–2	—	2–1	1–1	1–1	1–0	2–0
Oro	0–3	2–3	0–0	0–0	1–1	0–2	1–2	3–3	0–2	1–1	2–0	—	0–2	2–1	1–1	5–2
Toluca	1–2	1–1	2–2	1–2	1–1	1–2	4–1	3–1	2–1	3–0	0–1	1–2	—	2–4	0–2	1–1
UNAM	1–2	2–3	1–3	4–1	3–0	4–2	2–1	4–1	2–1	1–1	1–2	2–2	4–2	—	2–1	2–0
Veracruz	1–1	3–4	1–0	1–0	1–2	4–2	2–0	3–1	1–0	3–2	1–1	2–3	0–2	3–0	—	1–0
Zacatepec	1–0	0–1	3–1	1–1	0–1	0–4	1–1	1–0	0–1	1–2	2–1	3–0	1–1	3–0	0–1	—

Updated to match(es) played on 19 December 1965. Source: RSSSF
Legend: Blue = home team win; Yellow = draw; Red = away team win.
