= 1964–65 Mexican Primera División season =

22nd professional season of the top-flight football league in Mexico

Primera División de México
- Season: 1964–65
- Champions: Guadalajara (7th title)
- Relegated: Nacional
- Matches: 240
- Goals: 611 (2.55 per match)

Statistics of the Primera División de México for the 1964–65 season.

== Overview ==
In order to increase the number of team from 14 to 16 for the 1964–65 season, the league made a Promotional Tournament. The top 2 teams would be in Primera Division. The playoff was composed of the lowest team from Primera division and the 2nd-5th teams in the standings from Segunda Division as Cruz Azul had earned automatic promotion. Nacional finished first securing another season in top flight. Veracruz finished in second place, and was promoted to Primera Division.

Cruz Azul (Jasso) was promoted to Primera División.

The season was contested by 16 teams, and Guadalajara won the championship.

Nacional was relegated to Segunda División.

=== Teams ===
Location of the 1964-65 Primera División teams

Team	City	Stadium
América	Mexico City	Olímpico Universitario
Atlante	Mexico City	Olímpico Universitario
Atlas	Guadalajara, Jalisco	Jalisco
Cruz Azul	Jasso, Hidalgo	10 de Diciembre
Guadalajara	Guadalajara, Jalisco	Jalisco
Irapuato	Irapuato, Guanajuato	Revolución
León	León, Guanajuato	La Martinica
Morelia	Morelia, Michoacán	Campo Independiente / Venustiano Carranza
Monterrey	Monterrey, Nuevo León	Tecnológico
Nacional	Guadalajara, Jalisco	Jalisco
Necaxa	Mexico City	Olímpico Universitario
Oro	Guadalajara, Jalisco	Jalisco
Toluca	Toluca, State of Mexico	Luis Gutiérrez Dosal
UNAM	Mexico City	Olímpico Universitario
Veracruz	Veracruz, Veracruz	Parque Deportivo Veracruzano
Zacatepec	Zacatepec, Morelos	Parque del Ingenio

== League standings ==
Pos	Team	Pld	W	D	L	GF	GA	GD	Pts	Qualification or relegation
1	Guadalajara	30	15	10	5	47	29	+18	40	Champions
2	Oro	30	16	6	8	60	40	+20	38	
3	Monterrey	30	17	3	10	45	27	+18	37	
4	América	30	10	14	6	36	23	+13	34	
5	Atlante	30	10	13	7	28	25	+3	33	
6	UNAM	30	11	9	10	39	39	0	31	
7	León	30	12	6	12	37	35	+2	30	
8	Cruz Azul	30	10	9	11	45	42	+3	29	
9	Atlas	30	10	9	11	37	45	−8	29	
10	Veracruz	30	10	8	12	41	44	−3	28	
11	Toluca	30	8	11	11	31	34	−3	27	
12	Necaxa	30	9	9	12	34	43	−9	27	
13	Morelia	30	10	6	14	44	52	−8	26	
14	Zacatepec	30	8	10	12	29	37	−8	26	
15	Irapuato	30	7	9	14	29	46	−17	23	
16	Nacional	30	6	10	14	29	50	−21	22	Relegated

1964–65 winners

7th title

== Results ==
Home \ Away	AME	ATE	ATS	CAZ	GDL	IRA	LEO	MTY	MOR	NAL	NEC	ORO	TOL	UNM	VER	ZAC
América	—	0–1	5–1	1–1	1–1	1–1	0–0	1–0	3–1	2–0	1–1	2–0	2–1	1–0	2–0	0–1
Atlante	1–0	—	0–2	1–1	0–0	1–2	0–1	2–1	2–0	3–1	0–1	0–0	1–1	1–1	0–0	1–0
Atlas	1–0	1–1	—	1–1	1–2	4–2	0–2	1–0	3–2	3–2	1–1	1–3	1–1	2–1	2–2	1–1
Cruz Azul	1–2	1–2	1–1	—	2–4	3–0	0–0	0–3	1–0	4–1	3–1	1–0	1–1	2–1	2–3	1–1
Guadalajara	0–0	3–0	3–1	3–2	—	0–0	1–1	0–3	2–0	1–1	5–1	1–1	1–3	2–3	1–0	0–0
Irapuato	0–0	3–1	2–1	1–2	0–1	—	0–1	0–1	2–1	1–1	1–5	3–2	0–1	0–1	0–0	1–1
León	2–1	0–0	0–2	0–3	0–1	5–2	—	2–0	1–0	0–3	2–2	2–3	2–0	3–1	0–0	1–0
Monterrey	0–0	0–3	1–1	4–1	2–1	1–0	3–0	—	2–1	0–1	6–2	3–0	1–1	1–0	3–0	2–0
Morelia	2–2	0–1	3–0	1–1	0–2	1–1	3–2	1–2	—	2–1	3–0	4–3	2–1	3–3	3–3	1–0
Nacional	1–1	1–1	1–0	2–1	1–1	4–1	0–3	0–2	1–2	—	0–0	1–6	0–0	1–2	0–0	2–1
Necaxa	1–1	1–1	0–2	0–3	1–2	1–0	1–0	1–0	2–0	1–1	—	1–2	3–0	0–1	4–2	0–0
Oro	2–2	1–0	2–1	2–3	1–2	4–1	3–2	3–0	3–1	1–1	1–1	—	0–0	5–1	4–2	1–0
Toluca	1–0	0–0	0–1	0–0	3–2	0–2	2–1	0–1	1–2	2–0	1–2	1–2	—	4–2	3–1	1–1
UNAM	0–0	2–2	1–1	2–1	0–1	1–1	2–1	1–0	1–1	5–0	1–0	0–1	1–1	—	2–1	0–1
Veracruz	1–1	1–2	3–0	1–0	0–3	0–1	2–1	3–1	4–1	2–1	1–0	1–3	1–0	1–1	—	5–1
Zacatepec	1–4	0–0	2–0	3–2	1–1	1–1	0–2	1–2	2–3	2–0	2–0	2–1	1–1	1–2	2–1	—

Updated to match(es) played on 27 December 1964. Source: RSSSF
Legend: Blue = home team win; Yellow = draw; Red = away team win.
