= List of Cruz Azul seasons =

Chronological list of Cruz Azul's seasons

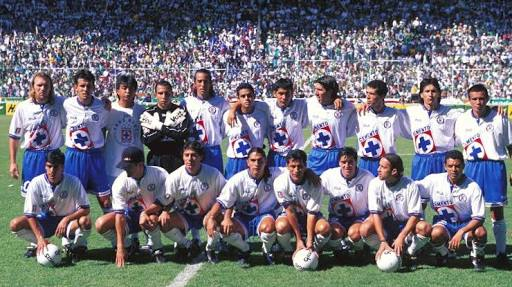
Cruz Azul before facing León in the second-leg of the Invierno 1997 final on 7 December 1997.

Club de Futbol Cruz Azul is a Mexican association football club originally based in Jasso, Hidalgo, and currently located in Mexico City, that competes in Liga MX. The club was founded in 1927 as a company team for cement company Cooperativa La Cruz Azul, and began participating in amateur competitions in the early 1930s. After winning promotion to the top tier by claiming the Segunda División de México title in the 1963–64 season, Cruz Azul quickly rose to prominence during the late 1960s and 1970s, establishing itself as one of the most successful and popular clubs in Mexican football. Since then, the club has won ten Primera División/Liga MX titles, four Copa MX, three Campeón de Campeones, one Supercopa MX, and one Supercopa de la Liga MX. Internationally, Cruz Azul has claimed the CONCACAF Champions Cup/Champions League on seven occasions, and has finished runner-up in the Copa Libertadores and the Copa Interamericana.

As of the end of the 2025–26 season, Cruz Azul has competed in 99 seasons overall, including 61 seasons in the top tier of the Mexican football league system and three in the second division. The table below details the club's achievements in domestic and international competitions from their early participation in regional leagues, through their professional era starting in the 1960s, up to the most recent completed season.

== History ==
Cruz Azul was founded in 1927 as a company football team in Jasso, Hidalgo, by workers of Cooperativa La Cruz Azul. The club competed in amateur leagues during its early decades, earning recognition in the Liga Amateur del Estado de Hidalgo, where it reportedly won numerous regional titles. In 1960, the club turned professional and joined the Segunda División de México, achieving promotion to the Primera División by winning the 1963–64 season. Cruz Azul won its first Primera División championship in the 1968–69 season and quickly became one of Mexico's dominant teams in the 1970s, claiming six league titles between 1969 and 1980. During this golden era, they also won multiple domestic cups and became widely known as La Máquina Celeste due to their dominant style of play. In the 1968–69 season, the club won a historic continental treble, consisting of the Primera División, Copa México, and CONCACAF Champions' Cup—a feat never before achieved in Mexican football. After a 23-year league title drought, Cruz Azul lifted their ninth league trophy—and their first in the Liga MX era—in the Guardianes 2021 tournament under Juan Reynoso.

The club first entered international competition in the 1969 CONCACAF Champions' Cup, where they won their first continental title. Cruz Azul went on to win a total of seven CONCACAF titles, adding further victories in the 1960s, 1970s, 1990s, 2010s, and 2020s. In the 1996–97 season, the club secured another continental treble, winning the Invierno 1997 league title, the 1996–97 Copa México, and the 1997 CONCACAF Champions' Cup. With these accomplishments, Cruz Azul became the first club in the world to win the continental treble twice, and remains the only team in Mexico and CONCACAF—and one of just five globally—to have achieved this feat more than once. In 2001, the club made history by becoming the first Mexican team to reach the Copa Libertadores final, narrowly losing to Boca Juniors in a penalty shootout. Cruz Azul also finished as runners-up in the Copa Interamericana in 1971.

== Key ==
- Pos = Final position
- Pld = Matches played
- W = Matches won
- D = Matches drawn
- L = Matches lost
- GF = Goals for
- GA = Goals against
- Pts = Points
- R32 = Round of 32
- R16 = Round of 16
- R1 = Round 1
- R2 = Round 2
- R3 = Round 3
- GS = Group stage
- QF = Quarter-finals
- SF = Semi-finals

Winners	Runners-up	Promoted ↑	Top scorer in Cruz Azul's division ♦

== Seasons ==
Correct as of the end of the 2025–26 season.

=== Long tournaments (1960–1996) ===
Seasons of Cruz Azul
Season	League									Liguilla	Copa MX	CdC	Supercopa MX	Supercopa de la Liga MX	CCC	Other competitions (Note: Includes Copa de la Segunda División, and Copa Interamericana.)	League Top scorer(s) (Note: Only includes goals scored in the regular season of Primera División/Liga MX.)	
Season	Division	Pos (Note: Position listed is general league rank.)	Pld	W	D	L	GF	GA	Pts	Liguilla	Copa MX	CdC	Supercopa MX	Supercopa de la Liga MX	CCC	Other competitions	Player(s)	Goals
1960–61	—									—	—	—	—	—	—	R3	?	?
1961–62	Segunda División (Note: The Segunda División de México was the second tier of Mexican football until 1994.)	4th	30	15	6	9	63	45	36	DNE	—	—	—	—	—	—	?	?
1962–63	Segunda División	5th	30	15	5	10	58	41	35	DNE	—	—	—	—	—	—	?	?
1963–64	Segunda División ↑	1st	30	19	7	4	67	32	45	DNE	FR	—	—	—	—	—	?	?
1964–65	Primera División	8th	30	10	9	11	45	42	29	DNE	SF	—	—	—	—	—	Guadalupe Díaz	11
1965–66	Primera División	13th	30	7	12	11	49	54	26	DNE	GS	—	—	—	—	—	?	?
1966–67	Primera División	10th	30	10	9	11	45	42	29	DNE	R16	—	—	—	—	—	Raúl Arellano	12
1967–68	Primera División	7th	30	12	10	8	36	30	34	DNE	SF	—	—	—	—	—	Raúl Arellano José Luis Guerrero	8
1968–69	Primera División	1st	30	18	8	4	49	26	44	DNE	W	W (Note: Automatically awarded as league and cup champion.)	—	—	W	—	?	?
1969–70	Primera División	2nd	30	14	11	5	40	19	39	DNE	R16	—	—	—	W	—	?	?
México 1970	Primera División	5th	14	7	2	5	13	13	16	W	Not held	—	—	—	W	—	?	?
1970–71	Primera División	7th	34	11	15	8	39	39	37	GS	SF	—	—	—	W	—	Octavio Muciño	19
1971–72	Primera División	1st	34	22	7	5	65	36	51	W	GS	RU	—	—	W	—	Horacio López Salgado Fernando Bustos	13
1972–73	Primera División	1st	34	19	8	7	60	37	46	W	Not held	—	—	—	—	RU	Horacio López Salgado	18
1973–74	Primera División	1st	34	18	13	3	69	35	49	W	RU	W	—	—	—	—	Horacio López Salgado	22
1974–75	Primera División	3rd	38	17	15	6	71	43	49	CGS	GS	—	—	—	—	—	Horacio López Salgado	25 ♦
1975–76	Primera División	4th	38	15	14	9	60	38	44	QF	GS	—	—	—	—	—	Horacio López Salgado Eladio Vera Fernando Bustos	8
1976–77	Primera División	4th	38	17	12	9	51	38	46	GS	Not held	—	—	—	—	—	Eladio Vera Alacrán Jiménez	11
1977–78	Primera División	6th	38	14	15	9	56	44	43	SF	Not held	—	—	—	—	—	Alacrán Jiménez Horacio López Salgado	11
1978–79	Primera División	1st	38	19	13	6	70	32	51	W	Not held	—	—	—	—	—	Rodolfo Montoya	20
1979–80	Primera División	2nd	38	20	15	3	67	34	55	W	Not held	—	—	—	—	—	Adrián Camacho	14
1980–81	Primera División	5th	38	14	14	10	45	36	42	RU	Not held	—	—	—	R3	—	Gerardo Lugo	7
1981–82	Primera División	7th	38	14	15	9	51	44	43	GS	Not held	—	—	—	R2	—	Carlos Eloir Perucci	21
1982–83	Primera División	12th	38	10	15	13	41	39	35	GS	Not held	—	—	—	W/O	—	Carlos Eloir Perucci Adrián Camacho	9
1983–84	Primera División	6th	38	14	13	11	47	38	41	SF	Not held	—	—	—	—	—	Carlos Eloir Perucci	15
1984–85	Primera División	3rd	38	17	13	8	53	38	47	QF	Not held	—	—	—	—	—	Agustín Manzo	16
Prode 1985	Primera División	4th	8	4	3	1	7	4	11	QF	Not held	—	—	—	—	—	Armando Romero	4
México 1986	Primera División	5th	18	8	5	5	24	18	21	QF	Not held	—	—	—	—	—	Agustín Manzo	7
1986–87	Primera División	2nd	40	19	16	5	53	32	54	RU	Not held	—	—	—	—	—	Agustín Manzo	16
1987–88	Primera División	8th	38	14	12	12	58	56	40	GS	RU	—	—	—	R3	—	Armando Romero	10
1988–89	Primera División	7th	38	16	11	11	68	59	43	RU	SF	—	—	—	R3	—	Patricio Hernández	27
1989–90	Primera División	17th	38	8	17	13	47	62	33	GS	R16	—	—	—	—	—	Luis Flores	15
1990–91	Primera División	3rd	38	15	15	8	47	38	45	QF	SF	—	—	—	—	—	Pedro Duana Mario Ordiales	9
1991–92	Primera División	5th	38	15	14	9	60	52	44	SF	SF	—	—	—	—	—	Carlos Hermosillo	12
1992–93	Primera División	6th	38	17	10	11	70	45	44	QF	Not held	—	—	—	—	—	Carlos Hermosillo	15
1993–94	Primera División	2nd	38	18	12	8	62	33	48	QF	Not held	—	—	—	—	—	Carlos Hermosillo	27 ♦
1994–95	Primera División	3rd	36	20	8	8	91	45	48	RU	R1	—	—	—	—	—	Carlos Hermosillo	35 ♦
1995–96	Primera División	1st	34	14	14	6	61	38	56	QF	SF	—	—	—	W	—	Carlos Hermosillo	26 ♦
Season	Division	Pos	Pld	W	D	L	GF	GA	Pts	Liguilla	Copa MX	CdC	Supercopa MX	Supercopa de la Liga MX	CCC	Other competitions	Player(s)	Goals

=== Short tournaments (1996–present) ===
Seasons of Cruz Azul
Season	Tournament	League									Liguilla	Copa MX	CdC	Supercopa MX	Supercopa de la Liga MX	CCC	Other competitions (Note: Includes Copa Libertadores, FIFA Club World Cup, Leagues Cup, and FIFA Intercontinental Cup.)	League Top scorer(s)		
Season	Tournament	Division	Pos	Pld	W	D	L	GF	GA	Pts	Liguilla	Copa MX	CdC	Supercopa MX	Supercopa de la Liga MX	CCC	Other competitions	Player(s)	Goals	
1996–97	Invierno 1996	Primera División	10th	17	5	5	7	26	26	20	GS	W	—	—	—	—	—	Carlos Hermosillo	13	
1996–97	Verano 1997	Primera División	9th	17	7	4	6	21	24	25	GS	W	—	—	—	—	—	Carlos Hermosillo	8	
1997–98	Invierno 1997	Primera División	2nd	17	8	7	2	29	16	31	W	Not held	—	—	—	W	—	Carlos Hermosillo	10	
1997–98	Verano 1998	Primera División	3rd	17	8	6	3	32	18	30	QF	Not held	—	—	—	W	—	Carlos Hermosillo	11	
1998–99	Invierno 1998	Primera División	1st	17	12	4	1	41	14	40	QF	Not held	—	—	—	QF	—	Francisco Palencia	7	
1998–99	Verano 1999	Primera División	3rd	17	9	4	4	30	24	31	SF	Not held	—	—	—	QF	—	Francisco Palencia	11	
1999–2000	Invierno 1999	Primera División	6th	17	7	6	4	25	16	27	RU	Not held	—	—	—	—	—	Francisco Palencia	8	
1999–2000	Verano 2000	Primera División	11th	17	6	3	8	38	33	21	GS	Not held	—	—	—	—	—	Francisco Palencia	12	
2000–01	Invierno 2000	Primera División	1st	17	10	3	4	34	21	33	QF	Not held	—	—	—	—	RU	Ángel Morales	12	
2000–01	Verano 2001	Primera División	13th	17	6	4	7	25	27	22	GS	Not held	—	—	—	—	RU	Ángel Morales Francisco Palencia	6	
2001–02	Invierno 2001	Primera División	4th	18	8	6	4	33	24	30	SF	Not held	—	—	—	—	—	Miguel Zepeda	8	
2001–02	Verano 2002	Primera División	9th	18	7	6	5	32	29	27	RE	Not held	—	—	—	—	—	Sebastián Abreu	19 ♦	
2002–03	Apertura 2002	Primera División	6th	19	7	7	5	30	26	28	QF	Not held	—	—	—	—	QF	Sebastián Abreu	7	
2002–03	Clausura 2003	Primera División	11th	19	5	9	5	24	24	24	RE	Not held	—	—	—	—	QF	Juan Carlos Cacho	10	
2003–04	Apertura 2003	Primera División	11th	19	7	6	6	30	30	27	QF	Not held	—	—	—	—	—	César Delgado	6	
2003–04	Clausura 2004	Primera División	11th	19	6	5	8	36	34	23	SF	Not held	—	—	—	—	—	Marcelo Delgado	13	
2004–05	Apertura 2004	Primera División	16th	17	4	4	9	30	37	16	GS	Not held	—	—	—	—	—	Luciano Figueroa	10	
2004–05	Clausura 2005	Primera División	2nd	17	9	4	4	36	19	31	SF	Not held	—	—	—	—	—	Francisco Fonseca	10	
2005–06	Apertura 2005	Primera División	4th	17	9	3	5	34	20	30	QF	Not held	—	—	—	—	—	César Delgado	9	
2005–06	Clausura 2006	Primera División	3rd	17	9	3	5	29	20	30	QF	Not held	—	—	—	—	—	César Delgado	9	
2006–07	Apertura 2006	Primera División	1st	17	9	3	5	27	20	30	QF	Not held	—	—	—	—	—	Miguel Sabah	10	
2006–07	Clausura 2007	Primera División	4th	17	8	4	5	22	17	28	SF	Not held	—	—	—	—	—	Richard Núñez	8	
2007–08	Apertura 2007	Primera División	7th	17	7	4	6	27	22	25	QF	Not held	—	—	—	—	—	Miguel Sabah	11	
2007–08	Clausura 2008	Primera División	3rd	17	9	4	4	27	17	31	RU	Not held	—	—	—	—	—	Miguel Sabah	8	
2008–09	Apertura 2008	Primera División	5th	17	7	5	5	29	23	26	RU	Not held	—	—	—	RU	—	Pablo Zeballos	7	
2008–09	Clausura 2009	Primera División	18th	17	2	7	8	26	33	13	GS	Not held	—	—	—	RU	—	Luis Ángel Landín	7	
2009–10	Apertura 2009	Primera División	2nd	17	11	0	6	35	19	33	RU	Not held	—	—	—	RU	—	Emanuel Villa	17 ♦	
2009–10	Bicentenario 2010	Primera División	9th	17	7	4	6	20	20	25	GS	Not held	—	—	—	RU	—	Emanuel Villa	6	
2010–11	Apertura 2010	Primera División	1st	17	12	3	2	33	13	39	QF	Not held	—	—	—	SF	—	Christian Giménez	8	
2010–11	Clausura 2011	Primera División	5th	17	7	5	5	25	20	26	SF	Not held	—	—	—	SF	—	Emanuel Villa	9	
2011–12	Apertura 2011	Primera División	2nd	17	8	5	4	21	14	29	QF	Not held	—	—	—	—	R16	Emanuel Villa	6	
2011–12	Clausura 2012	Primera División	9th	17	6	7	4	29	21	25	RP	Not held	—	—	—	—	R16	Emanuel Villa	8	
2012–13	Apertura 2012	Liga MX	6th	17	6	8	3	22	15	26	QF	GS	—	—	—	—	—	Mariano Pavone	7	
2012–13	Clausura 2013	Liga MX	5th	17	8	5	4	35	19	29	RU	W	—	—	—	—	—	Mariano Pavone	12	
2013–14	Apertura 2013	Liga MX	4th	17	8	5	4	21	17	29	QF	DNP	—	—	—	W	—	Joao Rojas Mariano Pavone	6	
2013–14	Clausura 2014	Liga MX	1st	17	11	3	3	28	19	36	QF	DNP	—	—	—	W	—	Marco Fabián	7	
2014–15	Apertura 2014	Liga MX	13th	17	5	6	6	16	15	21	RP	DNP	—	—	—	GS	4th	Mariano Pavone	4	
2014–15	Clausura 2015	Liga MX	9th	17	7	4	6	14	14	25	RP	DNP	—	—	—	GS	4th	Roque Santa Cruz	4	
2015–16	Apertura 2015	Liga MX	14th	17	5	5	7	19	25	20	RP	QF	—	—	—	—	—	Christian Giménez Matías Vuoso	4	
2015–16	Clausura 2016	Liga MX	9th	17	5	7	5	25	24	22	RP	SF	—	—	—	—	—	Jorge Benítez	9	
2016–17	Apertura 2016	Liga MX	14th	17	4	7	6	25	23	19	RP	QF	—	—	—	—	—	Christian Giménez	5	
2016–17	Clausura 2017	Liga MX	11th	17	5	6	6	19	20	21	RP	SF	—	—	—	—	—	Ángel Mena	5	
2017–18	Apertura 2017	Liga MX	6th	17	7	6	4	22	22	27	QF	R16	—	—	—	—	—	Felipe Mora	8	
2017–18	Clausura 2018	Liga MX	12th	17	5	7	5	22	18	22	RP	GS	—	—	—	—	—	Felipe Mora	4	
2018–19	Apertura 2018	Liga MX	1st	17	11	3	3	26	13	36	RU	W	—	—	—	—	—	Martín Cauteruccio Elías Hernández	5	
2018–19	Clausura 2019	Liga MX	4th	17	8	6	3	26	15	30	QF	GS	—	—	—	—	—	Milton Caraglio	11	
2019–20	Apertura 2019	Liga MX	12th	18	5	5	8	25	24	23	RP	DNP	—	W	—	—	W	Jonathan Rodríguez	7	
2019–20	Clausura 2020	Liga MX	1st (Note: The Clausura 2020 season ended early due to the coronavirus pandemic. As a result, Cruz Azul concluded the league season in first place, but were not awarded the title.)	10	7	1	2	24	14	22	Not held	DNP	—	W	—	QF	W	Jonathan Rodríguez	9	
2020–21	Guardianes 2020	Liga MX	4th	17	9	2	6	23	16	29	SF	Not held	—	—	—	QF	—	Jonathan Rodríguez	12 ♦	
2020–21	Guardianes 2021	Liga MX	1st	17	13	2	2	26	12	41	W	Not held	—	—	—	SF	—	Jonathan Rodríguez	9	
2021–22	Apertura 2021	Liga MX	8th	17	5	8	4	21	17	23	RE	Not held	W	—	—	SF	—	Roberto Alvarado Bryan Angulo Santiago Giménez	4	
2021–22	Clausura 2022	Liga MX	8th	17	7	4	6	20	17	25	QF	Not held	W	—	—	SF	—	Juan Escobar	4	
2022–23	Apertura 2022	Liga MX	7th	17	7	3	7	26	34	24	QF	Not held	—	—	W	—	—	Santiago Giménez	5	
2022–23	Clausura 2023	Liga MX	8th	17	7	3	7	21	22	24	RE	Not held	—	—	W	—	—	Uriel Antuna	6	
2023–24	Apertura 2023	Liga MX	16th	17	5	2	10	21	29	17	RP	Not held	—	—	—	—	R32	Ángel Sepúlveda	6	
2023–24	Clausura 2024	Liga MX	2nd	17	10	3	4	23	14	33	RU	Not held	—	—	—	—	R32	Uriel Antuna	8 ♦	
2024–25	Apertura 2024	Liga MX	1st	17	13	3	1	39	12	42	SF	Not held	—	—	—	W	R16	Ángel Sepúlveda	9	
2024–25	Clausura 2025	Liga MX	3rd	17	9	6	2	26	16	33	SF	Not held	—	—	—	W	R16	Ignacio Rivero	5	
2025–26	Apertura 2025	Liga MX	3rd	17	10	5	2	32	20	35	SF	Not held	—	—	—	QF	LP	Gabriel Fernández Ángel Sepúlveda	7	
2025–26	Apertura 2025	Liga MX	3rd	17	10	5	2	32	20	35	SF	Not held	—	—	—	QF	R2	Gabriel Fernández Ángel Sepúlveda	7	
2025–26	Clausura 2026	Liga MX	3rd	17	9	6	2	31	18	33	W	Not held	—	—	—	QF	R2	José Paradela	6	
2025–26	Season	Tournament	Division	Pos	Pld	W	D	L	GF	GA	Pts	Liguilla	Copa MX	CdC	Supercopa MX	Supercopa de la Liga MX	CCC	Other competitions	Player(s)	Goals
