= 1988 Campeón de Campeones =

América	Puebla
3	2

First-leg
América	Puebla
1	2
- Date: 7 July 1988
- Venue: Estadio Cuauhtémoc, Puebla

Second-leg
Puebla	América
0	2
- Date: 10 July 1988
- Venue: Estadio Azteca, Mexico DF
- Attendance: 75,000

The 1988 Campeón de Campeones was the 35th edition of the Campeón de Campeones, an annual football super cup match. (Note: The edition number was calculated based on figures provided by Goal.com, with the first Campeón de Campeones having been held in 1941–42.) The competition had not been played since 1976, marking this edition as its revival after a 12-year hiatus. Unlike most editions, this edition was played over two-legs, making it the second instance in the competition's history to use this format, the first being in 1968. The match-up featured América, the winners of the 1987–88 Mexican Primera División, and Puebla, the winners of the 1987–88 Copa México. The first-leg was played on 7 July 1988 at Estadio Cuauhtémoc, Puebla and the second-leg on 10 July 1988 at Estadio Azteca, Mexico DF.

In the first-leg, Puebla defeated América 2–1, but in the second-leg América responded with a 2–0 victory, winning the tie 3–2 on aggregate and claiming their third Campeón de Campeones title.

== Match details ==
=== First leg ===
7 July 1988

Puebla	2–1	América
Gamal 9'; Bernal 17'		Farfán 66'

Estadio Cuauhtémoc, Puebla

Puebla	América

Puebla:
Alberto Aguilar
Ángel Torres
Héctor Rosete
Aarón Gamal
Arturo Orozco	(red card) 70'
Guillermo Cossío
Marcelino Bernal
Daniel Bartolotta	(substituted off) 60'
René Paúl Moreno	(substituted off) 75'
Ángel Ramos
Mario Hernández
Substitutes:
Luis Enrique Fernández	(substituted on) 60'
Rafael Amador	(substituted on) 75'
Manager:
(Uruguay) Joaquín Caparrós

Club América:
Adrián Chávez
Manuel Rodríguez
Guillermo Huerta
Alfredo Tena	(substituted off) 45'
Efraín Herrera
Cristóbal Ortega
Gonzalo Farfán
Antonio Carlos Santos
Adrián Camacho	(substituted off) 60'
Carlos Hermosillo
Luís Roberto Alves
Substitutes:
José Enrique Vaca	(substituted on) 45'
Efraín Munguía	(substituted on) 60'
Manager:
(Brazil) Jorge Vieira

=== Second leg ===
10 July 1988

América	2–0	Puebla
Hermosillo 14'; Huerta 75'

Estadio Azteca, Mexico DF
Attendance: 75,000

América	Puebla

América:
Adrián Chávez
Manuel Rodríguez
Guillermo Huerta
José Enrique Vaca
Efraín Herrera
Cristóbal Ortega
Gonzalo Farfán
Antonio Carlos Santos	(substituted off) 61'
Adrián Camacho	(substituted off) 70'
Carlos Hermosillo
Luís Roberto Alves
Substitutes:
Efraín Munguía	(substituted on) 61'
Roberto Alderete	(substituted on) 70'
Manager:
(Brazil) Jorge Vieira

Puebla F.C.:
Alberto Aguilar
Ángel Torres	(red card) 84'
Héctor Rosete
Aarón Gamal
Arturo Orozco
Guillermo Cossío	(substituted off) 64'
Marcelino Bernal
Daniel Bartolotta
René Paúl Moreno
Ángel Ramos
Mario Hernández
Substitutes:
Rafael Amador	(substituted on) 64'
Manager:
(Uruguay) Joaquín Caparrós

Campeón de Campeones
1988 Winners
América
Third Title
