= 1974–75 Mexican Primera División season =

33rd professional season of the top-flight football league in Mexico

Primera División de México
- Season: 1974–75
- Champions: Toluca (3rd title)
- Relegated: Ciudad Madero
- Champions' Cup: León
- Matches: 392
- Goals: 1,125 (2.87 per match)
- Top goalscorer: Horacio López Salgado (25 goals)

Statistics of the Mexican Primera División for the 1974–75 season.

== Overview ==
UANL was promoted to Primera División.

Segunda División semifinalists, UASLP-Pumas (who re-branded to Atlético Potosino) and Unión de Curtidores were promoted to the Primera División to increase the number of teams to 20.

UdeG acquired Torreón franchise.

This season was contested by 20 teams, and Toluca won the championship.

Ciudad Madero was relegated to Segunda División.

=== Teams ===
Location of the 1974-75 Primera División teams

Team	City	Stadium
América	Mexico City	Azteca
Atlante	Mexico City	Azteca
Atlas	Guadalajara, Jalisco	Jalisco
Atlético Español	Mexico City	Azteca
Atlético Potosino	San Luis Potosí, S.L.P.	Plan de San Luis
Ciudad Madero	Ciudad Madero, Tamaulipas	Tamaulipas
Cruz Azul	Mexico City	Azteca
Guadalajara	Guadalajara, Jalisco	Jalisco
Jalisco	Guadalajara, Jalisco	Jalisco
Laguna	Torreón, Coahuila	San Isidro
León	León, Guanajuato	León
Monterrey	Monterrey, Nuevo León	Universitario
Puebla	Puebla, Puebla	Cuauhtémoc
Toluca	Toluca, State of Mexico	Toluca 70
Unión de Curtidores	León, Guanajuato	León
UANL	Monterrey, Nuevo León	Universitario
UdeG	Guadalajara, Jalisco	Jalisco
UNAM	Mexico City	Olímpico Universitario
Veracruz	Veracruz, Veracruz	Veracruzano
Zacatepec	Zacatepec, Morelos	Agustín "Coruco" Díaz

== Group stage ==
=== Group 1 ===
Pos	Team	Pld	W	D	L	GF	GA	GD	Pts	Qualification
1	Toluca	38	19	12	7	54	32	+22	50	Playoffs
2	Cruz Azul	38	17	15	6	71	43	+28	49	Playoffs
3	Atlético Español	38	20	7	11	62	39	+23	47	
4	América	38	17	13	8	65	43	+22	47	
5	UDG	38	13	16	9	63	44	+19	42	
6	Atlas	38	13	14	11	70	66	+4	40	
7	Guadalajara	38	13	12	13	50	52	−2	38	
8	Veracruz	38	12	7	19	41	65	−24	31	
9	Atlético Potosino	38	10	9	19	44	61	−17	29	
10	Atlante	38	7	14	17	43	69	−26	28	

=== Group 2 ===
Pos	Team	Pld	W	D	L	GF	GA	GD	Pts	Qualification or relegation
1	León	38	21	9	8	70	50	+20	51	Playoffs
2	Unión de Curtidores	38	15	16	7	65	44	+21	46	Playoffs
3	Monterrey	38	15	14	9	72	55	+17	44	
4	Puebla	38	14	12	12	49	48	+1	40	
5	Club Jalisco	38	10	16	12	41	45	−4	36	
6	UANL	38	8	18	12	47	61	−14	34	
7	UNAM	38	11	10	17	56	61	−5	32	
8	Zacatepec	38	12	5	21	59	63	−4	29	
9	Laguna	38	9	8	21	43	69	−26	26	
10	Ciudad Madero	38	5	11	22	31	86	−55	21	Relegated

== Results ==
Home \ Away	AME	ATT	ATL	ATE	APO	CRA	GDL	JAL	LAG	LEO	CDM	MTY	PUE	TOL	UDC	UNL	UDG	UNI	VER	ZAC
América		2–1	1–1	1–2	5–2	0–2	2–2	2–0	1–1	2–2	6–2	2–1	0–0	2–1	2–2	2–2	2–2	3–2	4–1	3–0
Atlante	1–2		1–1	2–2	1–0	0–1	2–2	0–2	1–1	1–4	1–1	1–2	3–3	0–2	1–2	1–1	2–2	1–2	2–1	1–0
Atlas	1–0	1–1		2–2	3–1	3–0	5–1	2–2	2–2	2–1	6–1	1–2	0–0	1–2	3–2	2–2	2–5	2–2	3–0	3–4
Atlético Español	0–1	1–1	1–0		4–0	2–2	0–2	2–1	4–3	3–1	8–0	1–0	0–1	1–1	1–0	0–1	1–0	1–3	2–1	2–0
Atlético Potosino	0–2	4–0	0–0	2–1		2–2	1–2	0–0	2–0	2–3	1–0	1–3	0–0	0–2	2–2	4–1	0–3	2–1	1–2	3–1
Cruz Azul	0–0	5–2	1–1	1–2	2–0		2–2	2–0	1–0	1–2	5–0	3–2	6–1	0–0	1–1	2–2	4–1	1–1	3–0	3–1
Guadalajara	2–2	1–0	2–2	0–1	2–3	0–0		0–4	0–3	0–3	0–0	2–2	3–0	1–2	0–2	2–2	2–1	0–1	4–1	2–0
Jalisco	1–1	3–3	0–1	0–2	1–1	3–3	1–0		1–0	1–0	0–0	1–2	2–0	1–2	1–1	1–1	1–1	2–1	1–1	2–2
Laguna	0–1	0–3	1–1	1–3	4–2	0–0	0–2	1–1		1–2	3–2	3–2	2–1	0–1	1–1	3–2	1–1	2–1	1–0	1–2
León	2–1	5–1	6–3	1–0	3–2	1–0	1–0	0–0	3–1		1–1	0–0	1–0	1–0	4–4	3–0	2–2	4–2	1–2	2–1
Ciudad Madero	2–1	1–4	2–1	0–2	1–0	0–3	0–1	0–3	2–1	0–1		2–2	0–0	4–2	2–2	2–3	1–1	1–2	1–3	0–1
Monterrey	0–1	2–0	1–1	1–1	1–1	1–2	0–3	3–0	2–0	1–1	2–2		4–0	1–0	4–2	2–1	3–3	5–1	4–2	4–2
Puebla	0–0	4–0	1–3	1–0	2–1	1–3	1–1	0–1	0–2	3–1	3–0	5–2		1–1	2–0	0–0	1–1	3–0	2–0	2–2
Toluca	1–0	1–1	5–0	2–3	1–0	2–2	1–0	2–0	2–0	2–0	2–0	0–0	4–1		0–0	2–0	3–1	1–0	3–3	1–0
Unión de Curtidores	1–0	1–2	4–1	2–1	0–0	3–1	3–0	0–0	4–2	0–1	3–0	2–2	3–0	2–0		4–0	1–1	1–1	2–2	2–1
UANL	1–1	0–0	1–2	1–0	2–1	1–1	0–0	0–1	4–3	1–1	0–0	3–3	2–3	1–1	1–2		1–2	2–0	1–0	2–1
UDG	1–2	5–1	0–1	1–3	4–1	2–0	0–0	2–0	4–0	3–0	4–1	1–1	0–0	0–0	0–0	1–1		3–1	2–3	1–0
UNAM	0–2	0–1	4–2	1–1	0–1	1–1	2–3	1–1	3–0	1–1	4–0	2–2	0–1	2–2	2–2	4–0	2–1		3–1	2–3
Veracruz	2–5	2–0	2–3	1–0	0–1	1–2	0–3	1–0	1–0	1–0	0–0	3–2	0–3	0–0	1–0	2–2	0–0	0–1		1–0
Zacatepec	2–1	0–0	3–2	1–2	0–0	2–3	2–3	3–0	7–1	2–3	4–0	1–3	0–3	3–0	1–2	2–2	0–1	2–0	3–0	

Legend: Blue = home team win; Yellow = draw; Red = away team win.

== Championship Group Stage Final ==
Pos	Team	Pld	W	D	L	GF	GA	GD	Pts
1	Toluca (C)	6	4	0	2	8	5	+3	8
2	León	6	3	1	2	7	5	+2	7
3	Unión de Curtidores	6	2	1	3	8	8	0	5
4	Cruz Azul	6	2	0	4	6	11	−5	4

(C) Champions

== Championship Group Stage results ==
=== Round 1 ===
12 June 1975

Cruz Azul	1-0	Toluca
López Salgado 30'

Estadio Azteca, Mexico City

12 June 1975

Unión de Curtidores	1-0	León
Czentoriky 59'

Estadio León, León

=== Round 2 ===
15 June 1975

Toluca	1-0	Cruz Azul
Velázquez 65'

Estadio Toluca 70, Toluca

15 June 1975

León	0-0	Unión de Curtidores

Estadio León, León

=== Round 3 ===
19 June 1975

Cruz Azul	0-1	León
		Salomone 49' (pen.)

Estadio Azteca, Mexico City

19 June 1975

Unión de Curtidores	0-3	Toluca
		Figueroa 69', 77'; Medina 76'

Estadio León, León

=== Round 4 ===
22 June 1975

Toluca	2-1	Unión de Curtidores
Estupiñán 20'; Eugui 84' (pen.)		Maciel 25'

Estadio Toluca 70, Toluca

22 June 1975

León	3-2	Cruz Azul
Chávez 58'; Caballero 67'; Salomone 72' (pen.)		Bustos 35', 62'

Estadio León, León

=== Round 5 ===
26 June 1975

Unión de Curtidores	1-2	Cruz Azul
Vargas 24'		Estrada 27' (pen.); Vera 29'

Estadio León, León

26 June 1975

Toluca	1-0	León
Estupiñán 62'

Estadio Toluca 70, Toluca

=== Round 6 ===
29 June 1975

Cruz Azul	1-5	Unión de Curtidores
Vera 3'		Vargas 2', 80', 85'; Czentoriky 39'; Carrillo 75'

Estadio Azteca, Mexico City

29 June 1975

León	3-1	Toluca
Guillén 5', 44'; Caballero 35'		de la Torre 87'

Estadio León, León

1974–75 winners

3rd title

== Top scorers ==
Player	Nationality	Goals	Club
Horacio López Salgado	Mexico	25	Cruz Azul
Fausto Vargas	Mexico	22	Unión de Curtidores
Roberto Salomone	Argentina	19	León
Eladio Vera	Paraguay	19	Cruz Azul
Ítalo Estupiñán	Ecuador	18	Toluca
Jair	Brazil	18	Leones Negros UdeG
Alcindo	Brazil	17	Jalisco
Alacrán Jiménez	Mexico	16	Monterrey
Cabinho	Brazil	15	Pumas UNAM
Juan Carlos Cárdenas	Argentina	15	Veracruz
Chepe Chávez	Mexico	15	León
