= Mario Hernández =

Mario Hernández may refer to:

- Mario Hernández (comics) (born 1953), American writer, artist and comics publisher
- Mario Hernández (fashion house) (est. 1978), a Colombian fashion house
- Mario Hernández (film director) (1936–2015), Mexican film director and screenwriter
- Mario Hernández (footballer, born 1957), Mexican football forward and manager
- Mario Hernández (footballer, born 1979), Mexican football defender
- Mario Hernández (footballer, born 1999), Spanish football left-back
- Mario Hernández Posadas (1929–2012), Mexican politician from Veracruz, president of the Senate in 1987
- Mario Fernando Hernández (1966–2008), Honduran politician
