= Addi (company) =

Colombian fintech and e-commerce company

- Type: Private
- Industry: Financial services
- Founded: September 2018; 8 years ago
- Founders: Santiago Suárez; Daniel Vallejo; Elmer Ortega
- Headquarters: Bogotá, Colombia
- Area served: Colombia
- Key people: Santiago Suárez (CEO)
- Products: Buy now, pay later credit, marketplace
- Number of employees: 800+ (2026)
- Subsidiaries: Addi S.A. Compañía de Financiamiento
- Website: addi.com

Addi is a Colombian financial technology and e-commerce company founded in 2018 and based in Bogotá, Colombia. It provides buy now, pay later (BNPL) consumer credit, which customers use to pay in installments for purchases from partner merchants, both online and in stores. By 2026 it was the largest provider of consumer credit in Colombia outside the supervision of the Superintendencia Financiera de Colombia. In 2026 it was licensed as a regulated financing company.

== History ==
=== Founding (2018–2021) ===
Addi was founded in 2018 by Santiago Suárez, Daniel Vallejo and Elmer Ortega to make digital commerce available in Latin America. At the time, fewer than 25% of people in the region had a credit card. Addi offered buy now, pay later credit at the checkout of partner merchants, which allowed customers to pay for purchases in installments. It started with point-of-sale credit at physical retailers in Colombia, where about 90% of retail sales took place in stores.

Monashees, Andreessen Horowitz and Village Global invested US$2.3 million around the time of its founding, and in April 2019 Addi raised a further US$12.5 million from Andreessen Horowitz to expand its lending online.

Early in the COVID-19 pandemic in 2020, Addi lost nearly all of its revenue. During this period it waived late-payment interest and collection fees, supported more than 600 families of salespeople at partner stores, and let customers whose income had fallen pay only the interest on their loans for up to 90 days. In May 2020 it raised US$15 million in a round led by Quona Capital, Foundation Capital and S7 Ventures, with Andreessen Horowitz and Monashees also investing. The round brought its total venture funding to about US$31 million, and at the time Addi had 75 employees. It then moved further into e-commerce, and by April 2021 its business had returned to pre-pandemic levels.

=== Brazil operations (2021–2023) ===
By early 2021 Addi had begun operating in Brazil, where it set up a second headquarters in São Paulo. Customers could pay for purchases over three months at no additional cost, or over up to 24 months for larger purchases. In May 2021 Addi raised US$35 million in equity in a round led by Union Square Ventures' Opportunity Fund, along with US$30 million in debt from Architect Capital. A US$75 million extension led by Greycroft in September brought the round to US$140 million and Addi's total funding since its founding to about US$220 million.

By September 2021 Addi had more than 150,000 customers and nearly 500 merchant partners, including Arturo Calle, Mario Hernández, Keep Running and Claro, and its workforce had grown to more than 260 employees. Earlier that year it had formed a partnership with Banco Santander, and by late 2021 it had introduced a one-click checkout feature.

In December 2021 Addi raised about US$200 million in equity and debt. The US$80 million equity portion was a Series C round led by GIC, with SoftBank's Latin America fund also investing, and the US$125 million in debt came from Goldman Sachs (US$100 million) and Architect Capital (US$25 million). The round valued Addi at more than US$700 million and brought its fundraising for 2021 to more than US$340 million.

In June 2022 Addi laid off an undisclosed number of employees, citing the global economic situation and a refocusing of its strategic priorities. A year later, in June 2023, it suspended its operations in Brazil to concentrate on Colombia, keeping part of its Brazilian team to strengthen the Colombian operation.

=== Financing company (2024–present) ===
In March 2024 Addi raised US$86 million, made up of US$36 million in equity in a round led by GIC, with Andreessen Horowitz and Union Square Ventures also investing, and US$50 million in debt from Goldman Sachs. The same month it began the regulatory process to become a financing company. In late 2024 the Superintendencia Financiera de Colombia approved the creation of the new entity, Addi S.A. Compañía de Financiamiento, with initial capital of COL$38 billion. In November 2024 Addi also secured a US$100 million credit facility from Victory Park Capital.

After years of losses, its Colombian subsidiary reported a net profit of more than COL$65 billion in 2025. That year Addi lent COL$5.2 trillion, and about 47% of its customers did not have a credit card.

In April 2026 the superintendence granted the financing company its operating license, which allowed Addi to take deposits covered by Colombia's deposit-insurance fund, the Financial Institutions Guarantee Fund (Fogafín). That same month, Addi closed a US$150 million structured credit line from JPMorgan (US$130 million) and Fasanara Capital (US$20 million). With it, Addi became the first Colombian company to receive a warehouse financing structure arranged by JPMorgan. Under the facility, the lenders fund about 85% of each loan and Addi funds the rest. The deal brought Addi's debt commitments to more than US$680 million, with Goldman Sachs, BBVA, Citigroup and JPMorgan among its main lenders.

Three months later, in July 2026, Addi raised a Series D round of about US$85 million, led by Citius and co-led by BTG Pactual, with GIC and Monashees also investing. By September 2026 Addi had more than 800 employees.

== Operations ==
Addi's credit is offered through partner merchants, both in physical stores and online. The company is based in Bogotá, and in 2020 it also had staff in Medellín, Cali, Barranquilla and London. By February 2020 Addi had more than 70,000 customers, and its credit was offered in more than 1,200 stores, including those of Corona, Pintuco and Haceb. Online stores can add Addi as a payment button, including stores built on the VTEX and Nuvemshop e-commerce platforms. By late 2021 its partner merchants ranged from large retailers such as Apple, Nike and Puma to small family-owned shops.

Beyond partner checkouts, Addi added a marketplace to its mobile app in 2024, where customers can make purchases directly. The marketplace launched with 50 merchants and more than 5,000 products and had more than 1,500 merchants by April 2024. Addi also operates in e-commerce, through its marketplace and through its payment option on merchants' websites and social media. In 2026 Addi partnered with the payments network Credibanco to offer its credit at Credibanco point-of-sale terminals, and by April 2026 it had also partnered with Deportes Tolima to offer financing for the club's official merchandise. By May 2026 it was the largest provider of consumer credit in Colombia not supervised by the superintendence, and its partner businesses had about 75,000 physical points of sale in 1,034 municipalities across the country.
