= 1987–88 Copa México =

Tournament details
- Country: Mexico
- Teams: 16

Final positions
- Champions: Puebla (3rd title)
- Runners-up: Cruz Azul

Tournament statistics
- Matches played: 15
- Goals scored: 95 (6.33 per match)

The 1987–88 Copa México was the 60th edition of the Copa México and the 33rd edition in the professional era. This tournament marked the return of the competition after a twelve-year hiatus.

The competition started on 29 January 1988 and concluded on 8 June 1988 with the final, held at the Estadio Cuauhtémoc in Puebla City, in which Puebla lifted the trophy for the third time ever with an away goal victory over Cruz Azul.

This edition was contested by the top 16 Primera División teams at the end of Round 19 of the 1987–88 Mexican Primera División season; Atlético Potosino, Irapuato, Tampico Madero and Tigres UANL were excluded. The tournament was played as a two-legged knockout stage, with matches held home and away.

== Knockout stage ==
=== Bracket ===
Round of 16; From 29 January to 14 February
Atlante	4	1	5
Morelia	0	3	3
Necaxa	2	1	3
Toluca (p)	1	2	3
Atlas	0	1	1
Puebla	0	3	3
Monterrey	2	2	4
América	0	2	2
Correcaminos	2	0	2
Tecos	2	3	5
Guadalajara	1	0	1
Cruz Azul	2	3	5
Neza	1	2	3
UNAM	1	3	4
Ángeles de Puebla	1	2	3
UdeG	0	2	2

Quarterfinals; From 16 March to 13 April
Atlante	1	1	2
Toluca	1	2	3
Puebla	2	3	5
Monterrey	3	1	4
Tecos	1	0	1
Cruz Azul	3	3	6
UNAM	3	4	7
Ángeles de Puebla	1	2	3

Semifinals; From 21 April to 18 May
Toluca	3	0	3
Puebla	2	2	4
Cruz Azul	1	3	4
UNAM	0	2	2

Finals; 25 May and 8 June
Puebla (a)	1	0	1
Cruz Azul	1	0	1

=== Semifinals ===
==== First leg ====
21 April

Toluca	3–2	Puebla
Lagunas 25'; Becerril 60'; Graniolatti 76'		Bartolotta 5', 30'

Estadio Nemesio Díez, Toluca

21 April

Cruz Azul	1–0	UNAM
Flores 68' (pen.)

Estadio Corregidora, Querétaro City

==== Second leg ====
4 May

Puebla	2–0	Toluca
Hernández 28'; Mendiburu 88'

Estadio Cuauhtémoc, Puebla City

Puebla won 4–3 on aggregate

18 May

UNAM	2–3	Cruz Azul
García 54'; L. Flores 83'		Manzo 47'; Duana 53'; I. Flores 87' (pen.)

Estadio Olímpico Universitario, Mexico City

Cruz Azul won 4–2 on aggregate

=== Finals ===
==== First leg ====
25 May

Cruz Azul	1–1	Puebla
Mojica 62'		Bernal 6'

Estadio Corregidora, Querétaro City

==== Second leg ====
8 June

Cruz Azul	0–0	Puebla

Estadio Cuauhtémoc, Puebla City

Puebla won the Cup on away goal

1987–88 Copa México winners
Puebla
3rd title
