= 1986–87 Mexican Primera División season =

45th professional season of the top-flight football league in Mexico

Primera División de México
- Season: 1986–87
- Champions: Guadalajara (9th title)
- Relegated: León; Cobras
- Champions' Cup: Morelia; Cruz Azul
- Matches: 434
- Goals: 1,024 (2.36 per match)

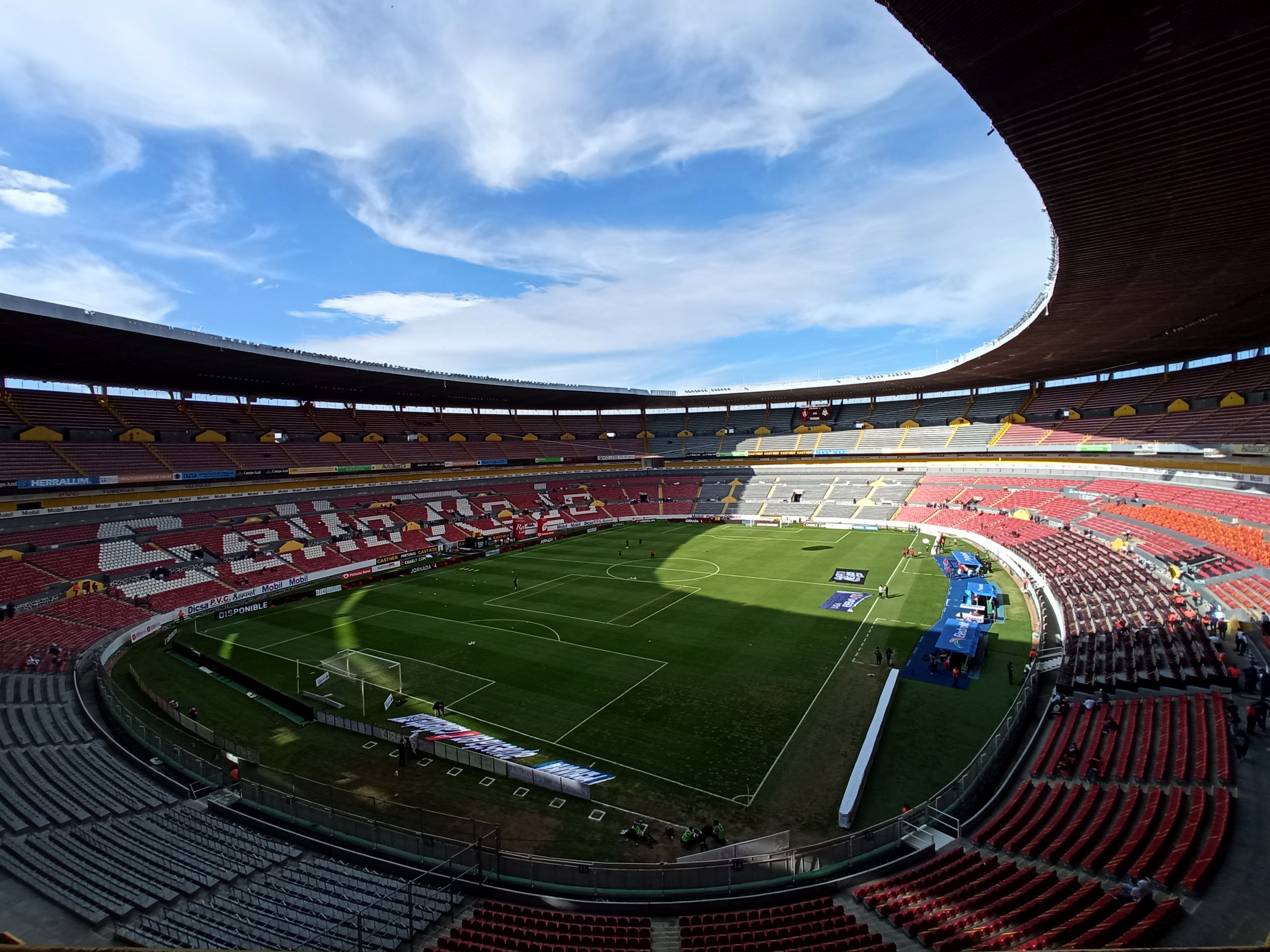
Jalisco Stadium, 2022

Statistics of the Mexican Primera División for the 1986–87 season.

== Overview ==
It was contested by 21 teams, and Guadalajara won the championship.

C.F. Cobras de Querétaro was promoted from Segunda División.

In the season were two teams relegated to Segunda División: Cobras and León.

=== Teams ===
Location of the 1986–87 Primera División teams

| Team | City | Stadium |
|---|---|---|
| América | Mexico City | Azteca |
| Ángeles | Puebla, Puebla | Cuauhtémoc |
| Atlante | Mexico City | Azulgrana |
| Atlas | Guadalajara, Jalisco | Jalisco |
| Atlético Potosino | San Luis Potosí, S.L.P. | Plan de San Luis |
| Cobras | Querétaro, Querétaro | Corregidora |
| Cruz Azul | Mexico City | Azteca |
| Guadalajara | Guadalajara, Jalisco | Jalisco |
| Irapuato | Irapuato, Guanajuato | Irapuato |
| León | León, Guanajuato | León |
| Morelia | Morelia, Michoacán | Venustiano Carranza |
| Monterrey | Monterrey, Nuevo León | Tecnológico |
| Necaxa | Mexico City | Azteca |
| Neza | Nezahualcóyotl, State of Mexico | Neza 86 |
| Puebla | Puebla, Puebla | Cuauhtémoc |
| Tampico Madero | Tampico–Madero, Tamaulipas | Tamaulipas |
| Tecos | Zapopan, Jalisco | Tres de Marzo |
| Toluca | Toluca, State of Mexico | Toluca 70-86 |
| UANL | Monterrey, Nuevo León | Universitario |
| UdeG | Guadalajara, Jalisco | Jalisco |
| UNAM | Mexico City | Olímpico Universitario |

== Group stage ==
=== Group 1 ===
| Pos | Team | Pld | W | D | L | GF | GA | GD | Pts | Qualification |
|---|---|---|---|---|---|---|---|---|---|---|
| 1 | Tecos | 40 | 12 | 15 | 13 | 54 | 55 | −1 | 39 | Playoff |
| 2 | Monterrey | 40 | 15 | 9 | 16 | 48 | 55 | −7 | 39 | Playoff |
| 3 | Toluca | 40 | 7 | 23 | 10 | 35 | 41 | −6 | 37 | |
| 4 | Atlante | 40 | 11 | 12 | 17 | 36 | 39 | −3 | 34 | |
| 5 | Necaxa | 40 | 8 | 17 | 15 | 33 | 48 | −15 | 33 | |

Source: rsssf.com

=== Group 2 ===
| Pos | Team | Pld | W | D | L | GF | GA | GD | Pts | Qualification or relegation |
|---|---|---|---|---|---|---|---|---|---|---|
| 1 | Guadalajara | 40 | 21 | 13 | 6 | 63 | 28 | +35 | 55 | Playoff |
| 2 | UANL | 40 | 14 | 16 | 10 | 58 | 53 | +5 | 44 | Playoff |
| 3 | Tampico Madero | 40 | 16 | 9 | 15 | 60 | 59 | +1 | 41 | |
| 4 | Deportivo Neza | 40 | 14 | 11 | 15 | 40 | 43 | −3 | 39 | |
| 5 | León | 40 | 12 | 8 | 20 | 42 | 57 | −15 | 32 | Relegated |

Source: rsssf.com

=== Group 3 ===
| Pos | Team | Pld | W | D | L | GF | GA | GD | Pts | Qualification |
|---|---|---|---|---|---|---|---|---|---|---|
| 1 | Morelia | 40 | 18 | 11 | 11 | 52 | 47 | +5 | 47 | Playoff |
| 2 | Puebla | 40 | 15 | 12 | 13 | 61 | 48 | +13 | 42 | Playoff |
| 3 | UNAM | 40 | 14 | 12 | 14 | 39 | 38 | +1 | 40 | |
| 4 | U. de G. | 40 | 10 | 16 | 14 | 44 | 50 | −6 | 36 | |
| 5 | Atlas | 40 | 11 | 11 | 18 | 46 | 57 | −11 | 33 | |

Source: rsssf.com

=== Group 4 ===
| Pos | Team | Pld | W | D | L | GF | GA | GD | Pts | Qualification or relegation |
|---|---|---|---|---|---|---|---|---|---|---|
| 1 | Cruz Azul | 40 | 19 | 16 | 5 | 53 | 32 | +21 | 54 | Playoff |
| 2 | América | 40 | 18 | 16 | 6 | 60 | 33 | +27 | 52 | Playoff |
| 3 | Atlético Potosino | 40 | 13 | 16 | 11 | 40 | 46 | −6 | 42 | |
| 4 | Irapuato | 40 | 9 | 18 | 13 | 45 | 49 | −4 | 36 | |
| 5 | Angeles | 40 | 9 | 16 | 15 | 40 | 49 | −9 | 34 | |
| 6 | Cobras | 40 | 8 | 15 | 17 | 36 | 58 | −22 | 31 | Relegated |

Source: rsssf.com

== Results ==
| Home \ Away | AME | ANG | ATN | ATL | APO | CRA | GDL | IRA | LEO | MTY | MOR | NEC | NEZ | PUE | QUE | TAM | TEC | TOL | UNL | UDG | UNM |
|---|---|---|---|---|---|---|---|---|---|---|---|---|---|---|---|---|---|---|---|---|---|
| América | | 0–0 | 2–0 | 1–0 | 0–0 | 1–2 | 1–0 | 2–0 | 1–1 | 1–0 | 4–0 | 0–0 | 1–1 | 3–0 | 3–2 | 2–0 | 0–0 | 4–1 | 0–0 | 1–0 | 2–2 |
| Ángeles | 3–2 | | 1–0 | 2–1 | 0–0 | 1–1 | 1–2 | 1–1 | 1–1 | 1–0 | 1–1 | 2–2 | 0–1 | 1–1 | 1–0 | 0–0 | 3–3 | 2–0 | 2–2 | 2–3 | 2–1 |
| Atlante | 0–2 | 1–1 | | 4–2 | 2–0 | 0–1 | 0–2 | 3–0 | 2–0 | 2–3 | 1–1 | 0–0 | 2–0 | 0–0 | 2–0 | 2–0 | 0–0 | 2–1 | 4–0 | 0–3 | 0–0 |
| Atlas | 1–2 | 2–2 | 0–0 | | 1–1 | 0–2 | 1–2 | 2–0 | 2–0 | 4–2 | 2–0 | 1–1 | 0–1 | 1–0 | 0–2 | 1–2 | 2–1 | 1–4 | 1–1 | 2–1 | 0–1 |
| Atlético Potosino | 1–4 | 2–1 | 0–0 | 1–1 | | 1–0 | 1–1 | 2–1 | 0–0 | 2–0 | 1–0 | 1–1 | 1–1 | 1–0 | 3–1 | 3–1 | 1–1 | 2–1 | 3–3 | 4–1 | 1–0 |
| Cruz Azul | 2–2 | 0–2 | 1–0 | 0–0 | 0–0 | | 1–5 | 0–0 | 6–2 | 0–0 | 2–0 | 1–0 | 3–1 | 1–1 | 0–0 | 2–1 | 2–0 | 2–1 | 1–1 | 2–1 | 1–0 |
| Guadalajara | 2–2 | 1–0 | 0–0 | 3–0 | 1–0 | 0–1 | | 1–0 | 2–1 | 4–1 | 1–1 | 3–0 | 1–0 | 0–0 | 2–0 | 2–0 | 1–2 | 5–1 | 1–1 | 1–1 | 2–0 |
| Irapuato | 0–0 | 3–1 | 0–0 | 1–1 | 1–1 | 0–0 | 1–0 | | 1–0 | 2–3 | 1–1 | 1–2 | 0–0 | 3–2 | 3–0 | 1–0 | 3–0 | 5–5 | 1–1 | 2–0 | 1–1 |
| León | 1–4 | 1–0 | 2–0 | 1–0 | 3–1 | 1–1 | 1–1 | 2–1 | | 2–1 | 0–1 | 0–1 | 0–1 | 0–1 | 4–0 | 3–2 | 2–0 | 1–1 | 2–0 | 1–2 | 1–1 |
| Monterrey | 2–1 | 1–0 | 1–0 | 2–1 | 4–0 | 2–1 | 0–0 | 1–1 | 1–2 | | 1–1 | 3–2 | 1–0 | 2–0 | 2–0 | 0–0 | 3–1 | 1–3 | 0–2 | 2–0 | 0–0 |
| Morelia | 1–1 | 1–0 | 1–0 | 3–0 | 2–0 | 1–3 | 1–3 | 1–0 | 2–1 | 1–0 | | 1–0 | 1–0 | 1–0 | 2–1 | 2–1 | 1–1 | 1–1 | 4–2 | 2–0 | 1–2 |
| Necaxa | 2–0 | 0–0 | 0–1 | 1–2 | 1–2 | 1–1 | 1–1 | 2–1 | 3–1 | 0–0 | 1–4 | | 1–0 | 0–1 | 0–1 | 0–0 | 0–0 | 0–3 | 1–4 | 0–0 | 1–2 |
| Deportivo Neza | 1–3 | 2–0 | 1–2 | 1–3 | 2–0 | 1–1 | 2–1 | 3–1 | 0–2 | 2–1 | 1–0 | 1–1 | | 1–0 | 1–1 | 0–1 | 0–0 | 1–1 | 2–0 | 4–1 | 0–2 |
| Puebla | 1–1 | 4–0 | 3–1 | 3–2 | 0–1 | 1–2 | 0–3 | 0–1 | 3–1 | 3–2 | 3–4 | 3–1 | 4–2 | | 3–1 | 8–1 | 0–2 | 2–0 | 3–0 | 1–1 | 1–1 |
| Cobras | 1–1 | 1–2 | 3–2 | 1–1 | 1–1 | 0–0 | 0–3 | 1–1 | 0–0 | 1–1 | 0–2 | 2–2 | 1–1 | 1–1 | | 0–2 | 2–1 | 3–0 | 1–0 | 0–0 | 2–1 |
| Tampico Madero | 3–1 | 2–1 | 1–0 | 3–2 | 2–0 | 2–2 | 4–2 | 2–2 | 2–1 | 4–0 | 2–1 | 1–2 | 0–1 | 1–2 | 2–3 | | 2–2 | 1–1 | 1–2 | 4–1 | 2–0 |
| Tecos | 1–1 | 1–1 | 4–2 | 0–1 | 0–0 | 0–3 | 1–2 | 1–1 | 2–0 | 3–1 | 2–0 | 1–1 | 1–1 | 0–1 | 2–0 | 2–3 | | 0–0 | 1–0 | 0–0 | 1–1 |
| Toluca | 1–0 | 1–1 | 0–0 | 0–0 | 0–0 | 0–2 | 0–0 | 1–1 | 2–0 | 4–1 | 4–4 | 0–0 | 1–0 | 0–0 | 1–0 | 1–1 | 2–2 | | 0–0 | 1–1 | 1–3 |
| UANL | 1–2 | 2–1 | 1–0 | 3–2 | 3–1 | 1–1 | 1–1 | 2–1 | 2–0 | 1–1 | 2–0 | 1–1 | 3–1 | 3–3 | 2–2 | 2–1 | 1–0 | 1–2 | | 4–1 | 1–1 |
| UDG | 0–0 | 1–0 | 1–1 | 1–1 | 3–0 | 1–0 | 0–1 | 2–2 | 2–0 | 3–1 | 3–0 | 1–1 | 0–0 | 2–2 | 3–1 | 1–1 | 1–1 | 0–1 | 1–1 | | 1–2 |
| UNAM | 0–2 | 1–0 | 1–0 | 1–2 | 2–1 | 1–2 | 0–0 | 2–0 | 4–1 | 0–1 | 0–0 | 0–1 | 1–2 | 0–0 | 0–0 | 1–2 | 1–0 | 0–2 | 2–1 | 1–0 | |

Source: rsssf.com
Legend: Blue = home team win; Yellow = draw; Red = away team win.

== Playoff ==
Quarter-finals
1 | Guadalajara | 3 | 1 | 4
12 | Monterrey | 3 | 0 | 3
3 | América | 2 | 1 | 3
6 | Puebla | 2 | 2 | 4
2 | Cruz Azul (p.) | 0 | 2 | 2 (3)
10 | Tecos | 2 | 0 | 2 (2)
4 | Morelia | 3 | 2 | 5
5 | UANL | 2 | 0 | 2

Semi-finals
1 | Guadalajara | 2 | 2 | 4
6 | Puebla | 0 | 0 | 0
2 | Cruz Azul | 0 | 4 | 4
4 | Morelia | 2 | 1 | 3

Final
1 | Guadalajara | 1 | 3 | 4
2 | Cruz Azul | 2 | 0 | 2

1986–87 winners

9th title
