= 1985–86 Mexican Primera División season =

44th professional season of the top division of Mexican football

Primera División de México
- Season: 1985–86
- Champions: Prode 1985: América (6th title); México 1986: Monterrey (1st title)
- 1987 CONCACAF Champions' Cup: América; Monterrey
- Matches: 288
- Goals: 785 (2.73 per match)

The 1985–86 season included the 44th and 45th editions of the top professional division of Mexican football, known as Primera División de México. The season was divided into two short tournaments (Prode 1985 and México 1986). It was started on July 12, 1985 and ended on March 1, 1986.

== Clubs ==
=== Stadiums and locations ===
Location of the 1985–86 Primera División teams

Team	City	Stadium
América	Mexico City	Azteca
Ángeles	Puebla, Puebla	Cuauhtémoc
Atlante	Mexico City	Azulgrana
Atlas	Guadalajara, Jalisco	Jalisco
Atlético Potosino	San Luis Potosí, S.L.P.	Plan de San Luis
Cruz Azul	Mexico City	Azteca
Guadalajara	Guadalajara, Jalisco	Jalisco
Irapuato	Irapuato, Guanajuato	Irapuato
León	León, Guanajuato	León
Morelia	Morelia, Michoacán	Venustiano Carranza
Monterrey	Monterrey, Nuevo León	Tecnológico
Necaxa	Mexico City	Azteca
Neza	Nezahualcóyotl, State of Mexico	José López Portillo
Puebla	Puebla, Puebla	Cuauhtémoc
Tampico Madero	Tampico–Madero, Tamaulipas	Tamaulipas
Tecos	Zapopan, Jalisco	Tres de Marzo
Toluca	Toluca, State of Mexico	Toluca 70-86
UANL	Monterrey, Nuevo León	Universitario
UdeG	Guadalajara, Jalisco	Jalisco
UNAM	Mexico City	Olímpico Universitario

== Torneo Prode 1985 ==
Prode 1985 was the 44th edition of the Primera División de México and the first short tournament of the season.

=== Regular phase ===
==== Group 1 ====
Pos	Team	Pld	W	D	L	GF	GA	GD	Pts	Qualification
1	Tampico Madero	8	5	0	3	21	12	+9	10	Playoff
2	Morelia	8	4	0	4	16	10	+6	8	Playoff
3	Toluca	8	3	2	3	8	12	−4	8	
4	UNAM	8	3	1	4	11	15	−4	7	
5	León	8	2	3	3	8	15	−7	7	

==== Group 2 ====
Pos	Team	Pld	W	D	L	GF	GA	GD	Pts	Qualification
1	Puebla	8	5	3	0	21	8	+13	13	Playoff
2	U. de G.	8	3	4	1	13	10	+3	10	Playoff
3	Deportivo Neza	8	2	3	3	12	18	−6	7	
4	Atlas	8	2	1	5	11	11	0	5	
5	Monterrey	8	1	3	4	10	20	−10	5	

==== Group 3 ====
Pos	Team	Pld	W	D	L	GF	GA	GD	Pts	Qualification
1	Atlante	8	4	3	1	11	7	+4	11	Playoff
2	Cruz Azul	8	4	3	1	7	4	+3	11	Playoff
3	Tecos	8	2	3	3	8	7	+1	7	
4	Necaxa	8	2	3	3	6	8	−2	7	
5	Atlético Potosino	8	0	4	4	5	11	−6	4	

==== Group 4 ====
Pos	Team	Pld	W	D	L	GF	GA	GD	Pts	Qualification
1	América	8	5	2	1	17	8	+9	12	Playoff
2	Guadalajara	8	4	2	2	12	10	+2	10	Playoff
3	Angeles	8	3	3	2	13	13	0	9	
4	Irapuato	8	1	3	4	8	14	−6	5	
5	UANL	8	1	2	5	8	13	−5	4	

=== Final phase (Liguilla) ===
Quarter-finals
2	América	2	1	3
6	U. de G.	0	1	1
3	Atlante	2	3	5
8	Morelia	1	0	1
1	Puebla	0	1	1
7	Guadalajara	0	0	0
4	Cruz Azul	1	1	2
5	Tampico Madero	2	2	4

Semi-finals
2	América	2	3	5
3	Atlante	2	1	3
1	Puebla	2	2	4
5	Tampico Madero	4	1	5

Final
2	América	1	4	5
5	Tampico Madero	4	0	4

Champions

6th title

== Torneo México 1986 ==
The tournament started on 11 October 1985 and ended on 1 March 1986.

It was contested by 20 teams divided into two teams of 10 in a round-robin system, with the first four teams of the group qualifying to the playoffs.

Monterrey beat Tampico Madero on aggregate for their first ever title.

=== Regular phase ===
==== Group 1 ====
Pos	Team	Pld	W	D	L	GF	GA	GD	Pts	Qualification
1	Puebla	18	9	6	3	24	15	+9	24	Playoff
2	América	18	5	11	2	21	14	+7	21	Playoff
3	Morelia	18	6	9	3	18	14	+4	21	Playoff
4	Atlante	18	7	5	6	20	17	+3	19	Playoff
5	Deportivo Neza	18	4	9	5	24	21	+3	17	
6	U. de G.	18	5	7	6	25	28	−3	17	
7	Irapuato	18	4	9	5	18	21	−3	17	
8	Atlético Potosino	18	6	5	7	22	26	−4	17	
9	UANL	18	3	8	7	19	25	−6	14	
10	León	18	5	3	10	15	25	−10	13	

==== Group 2 ====
Pos	Team	Pld	W	D	L	GF	GA	GD	Pts	Qualification
1	Monterrey	18	13	3	2	43	18	+25	29	Playoff
2	Tampico Madero	18	11	2	5	45	25	+20	24	Playoff
3	Cruz Azul	18	8	5	5	24	18	+6	21	Playoff
4	Guadalajara	18	6	7	5	30	25	+5	19	Playoff
5	Tecos	18	8	3	7	27	29	−2	19	
6	Atlas	18	5	5	8	28	35	−7	15	
7	Necaxa	18	5	4	9	19	27	−8	14	
8	Toluca	18	5	4	9	19	32	−13	14	
9	UNAM	18	4	5	9	23	39	−16	13	
10	Angeles	18	4	4	10	14	24	−10	12	

=== Final phase (Liguilla) ===
Quarter-finals
1	Monterrey	0	6	6
8	Atlante	0	0	0
2	Puebla	2	1	3
7	Guadalajara	3	1	4
3	Tampico Madero	2	2	4
6	Morelia	2	0	2
4	América	1	1	2
5	Cruz Azul	0	0	0

Semi-finals
1	Monterrey	1	1	2
7	Guadalajara	0	0	0
3	Tampico Madero	2	4	6
4	América	3	0	3

Final
1	Monterrey	1	2	3
3	Tampico Madero	2	0	2

Champions

1st title
