= 1984–85 Mexican Primera División season =

43rd professional season of the top-flight football league in Mexico

Primera División de México
- Season: 1984–85
- Champions: América (5th title)
- Relegated: Zacatepec
- Matches: 394
- Goals: 1,029 (2.61 per match)

Statistics of the Primera División de México for the 1984–85 season.

== Overview ==
It was contested by 20 teams, and América won the championship.

On August 20, 1984, the Mexican Football Federation accepted the request of C.F. Oaxtepec. to move to Puebla, for this reason, the club changed its name to Ángeles de Puebla.

Zacatepec was promoted from Segunda División, also, this team was relegated on this season.

=== Teams ===
Location of the 1984-85 Primera División teams

Team	City	Stadium
América	Mexico City	Azteca
Ángeles	Puebla, Puebla	Cuauhtémoc
Atlante	Mexico City	Azulgrana
Atlas	Guadalajara, Jalisco	Jalisco
Atlético Potosino	San Luis Potosí, S.L.P.	Plan de San Luis
Cruz Azul	Mexico City	Azteca
Guadalajara	Guadalajara, Jalisco	Jalisco
León	León, Guanajuato	León
Morelia	Morelia, Michoacán	Venustiano Carranza
Monterrey	Monterrey, Nuevo León	Tecnológico
Necaxa	Mexico City	Azteca
Neza	Nezahualcóyotl, State of Mexico	José López Portillo
Puebla	Puebla, Puebla	Cuauhtémoc
Tampico Madero	Tampico-Madero, Tamaulipas	Tamaulipas
Tecos	Zapopan, Jalisco	Tres de Marzo
Toluca	Toluca, State of Mexico	Toluca 70
UANL	Monterrey, Nuevo León	Universitario
UdeG	Guadalajara, Jalisco	Jalisco
UNAM	Mexico City	Olímpico Universitario
Zacatepec	Zacatepec, Morelos	Agustín Coruco Díaz

== Group stage ==
=== Group 1 ===
Pos	Team	Pld	W	D	L	GF	GA	GD	Pts	Qualification
1	América	38	17	12	9	53	40	+13	46	Playoff
2	León	38	12	18	8	56	46	+10	42	Playoff
3	UANL	38	13	9	16	41	45	−4	35	
4	Deportivo Neza	38	8	12	18	44	58	−14	28	
5	Necaxa	38	5	15	18	37	59	−22	25	

=== Group 2 ===
Pos	Team	Pld	W	D	L	GF	GA	GD	Pts	Qualification
1	UNAM	38	25	5	8	71	38	+33	55	Playoff
2	Atlas	38	16	11	11	55	51	+4	43	Playoff
3	Tampico Madero	38	17	8	13	65	58	+7	42	
4	Ángeles	38	12	11	15	54	61	−7	35	
5	Morelia	38	6	18	14	37	55	−18	30	

=== Group 3 ===
Pos	Team	Pld	W	D	L	GF	GA	GD	Pts	Qualification
1	UDG	38	16	15	7	60	44	+16	47	Playoff
2	Cruz Azul	38	17	13	8	53	38	+15	47	Playoff
3	Atlante	38	17	10	11	51	44	+7	44	
4	Atlético Potosino	38	10	14	14	49	60	−11	34	
5	Monterrey	38	10	12	16	50	68	−18	32	

=== Group 4 ===
Pos	Team	Pld	W	D	L	GF	GA	GD	Pts	Qualification or relegation
1	Guadalajara	38	16	13	9	49	30	+19	45	Playoff
2	Puebla	38	13	11	14	53	43	+10	37	Playoff
3	Tecos	38	12	12	14	52	50	+2	36	
4	Toluca	38	8	14	16	34	53	−19	30	
5	Zacatepec	38	10	7	21	31	54	−23	27	Relegated

== Results ==
Home \ Away	AME	ANG	ATN	ATL	APO	CRA	GDL	LEO	MTY	MOR	NEC	NEZ	PUE	TAM	TEC	TOL	UNL	UDG	UNM	ZAC
América		2–1	1–1	1–1	1–2	2–2	0–0	3–1	3–2	2–1	3–2	0–1	1–0	3–1	1–0	1–0	1–0	2–2	2–2	3–1
Ángeles	2–2		1–1	4–1	3–0	0–1	3–2	2–1	2–0	1–0	1–1	2–1	1–1	2–1	3–1	0–0	2–0	2–2	0–2	4–2
Atlante	1–2	0–1		0–2	2–1	0–0	2–1	2–1	3–1	1–0	1–0	2–1	3–0	3–1	4–1	0–1	1–1	1–1	0–1	2–0
Atlas	0–0	3–2	0–2		3–1	2–1	0–0	0–2	3–1	3–3	2–0	2–1	0–0	5–2	2–1	4–3	3–1	0–1	1–2	2–1
Atlético Potosino	3–1	1–0	2–0	1–1		4–5	0–0	0–0	1–2	1–0	1–1	1–0	0–3	0–0	5–1	3–1	1–1	2–2	1–4	0–0
Cruz Azul	1–0	4–0	0–1	3–0	1–1		1–0	0–0	1–0	2–0	4–1	0–0	1–0	2–1	2–1	0–2	1–1	0–1	1–1	2–1
Guadalajara	0–0	6–1	1–2	0–0	3–1	1–1		0–1	2–0	1–1	2–0	2–1	1–0	1–1	0–0	2–1	3–1	3–0	0–0	2–0
León	2–1	0–0	2–2	1–1	5–1	3–1	0–1		2–0	1–1	2–2	2–2	2–0	2–2	0–0	1–0	0–0	0–0	3–0	1–0
Monterrey	1–2	1–1	3–2	1–4	1–1	2–2	1–1	3–3		1–1	2–0	2–1	1–1	1–1	3–1	2–1	2–0	2–1	1–3	0–1
Morelia	2–4	3–3	1–1	0–0	0–0	1–1	1–0	2–2	1–1		1–1	0–0	3–2	2–1	2–3	0–1	0–1	0–3	0–4	2–0
Necaxa	0–2	3–1	1–2	2–0	0–0	0–1	1–2	4–2	3–3	2–2		1–3	1–0	1–1	2–2	0–0	1–1	1–3	0–2	0–0
Deportivo Neza	1–4	3–2	0–0	0–2	3–3	2–0	1–2	2–2	1–2	0–0	1–3		3–2	2–1	3–1	1–1	0–0	2–2	0–2	1–1
Puebla	1–1	3–1	3–0	2–1	2–0	2–2	3–0	1–1	2–0	4–1	1–1	2–0		2–0	1–1	2–1	3–1	1–2	2–0	0–0
Tampico Madero	1–0	3–1	3–4	3–2	3–2	2–1	1–0	2–1	4–0	4–0	0–0	2–1	3–2		3–0	1–1	2–1	2–1	4–2	3–1
Tecos	0–1	0–0	1–2	1–1	4–2	0–1	2–2	3–3	5–2	0–0	1–1	3–2	2–1	2–0		3–2	1–0	1–1	2–2	2–1
Toluca	0–0	2–1	1–1	2–0	0–0	1–1	0–0	0–2	1–0	1–1	2–0	3–1	2–1	1–1	2–1		2–0	1–1	0–1	0–0
UANL	2–0	2–1	2–1	1–1	2–1	1–2	0–1	2–0	2–2	3–1	1–0	1–0	0–0	1–2	4–1	2–1		1–2	1–0	2–0
UDG	1–1	2–2	0–0	1–2	1–2	1–1	1–0	3–3	1–1	2–1	2–0	1–1	3–1	3–1	2–0	1–2	2–0		0–4	3–0
UNAM	1–0	2–0	4–1	4–0	1–3	3–2	1–3	2–0	4–2	0–0	2–1	0–1	3–2	3–1	1–0	2–1	2–1	1–2		1–0
Zacatepec	1–0	2–1	2–0	0–1	3–1	0–2	1–4	1–2	0–1	1–3	3–0	1–1	1–0	2–1	0–0	2–1	2–1	0–3	0–2	

Legend: Blue = home team win; Yellow = draw; Red = away team win.

== Relegation playoff ==
- Zacatepec 1-2; 0-1 Necaxa

== Playoff ==
Quarter-finals
1	UNAM (p.)	0	2	2 (7)
10	Puebla	2	0	2 (5)
2	U. de G.	0	2	2 (6)
8	León (p.)	1	1	2 (7)
4	América	2	1	3
5	Guadalajara	0	0	0
3	Cruz Azul	1	0	1
7	Atlas	1	2	3

Semi-finals
1	UNAM	3	2	5
8	León	3	0	3
4	América (p.)	1	0	1 (9)
7	Atlas	1	0	0 (8)

Final
1	UNAM	1	0	1
4	América	1	0	1

=== Championship Playoff Game ===
May 28, 1985	UNAM	1–3	América	Querétaro
	Ricardo Ferreti 73'	Report	Daniel Alberto Brailowsky 11', 51'; Carlos Hermosillo 76'	Stadium: Estadio Corregidora; Referee: Joaquín Urrea

1984–85 winners

5th title
