= Mendiburu =

Mendiburu is a Basque surname. Notable people with this surname include:

- Javier Mendiburu (born 1980), Spanish basketball player
- Manuel de Mendiburu (1805–1885), Peruvian statesman
- Omar Mendiburu (1960–2025), Mexican footballer
- Sandrine Mendiburu (born 1972), French golfer
