= Aarón Gamal =

Mexican footballer (1959–2021)

Personal information
- Full name: Aarón Gamal Aguirre Fimbres
- Date of birth: 8 January 1959
- Place of birth: Suaqui Grande, Mexico
- Date of death: 16 March 2021 (aged 62)
- Position: Defender

Senior career*
Years	Team	Apps	(Gls)
1980–1986	Deportivo Neza	141	(9)
1986–1987	Ángeles de Puebla	39	(3)
1987–1988	Puebla	36	(2)
1988–1991	Tigres	51	(6)
Total		267	(20)

International career
1984–1985	Mexico	2	(0)
- * Club domestic league appearances and goals

Aarón Gamal (8 January 1959 – 16 March 2021) was a Mexican footballer who played in the Liga MX. He also played for the Mexico national team at junior and senior levels.

== Club career ==
Born in Suaqui Grande, Gamal played both baseball and football as a youth. He began his professional footballing career with Deportivo Neza, and in 1981, he became the first person from Hermosillo to play in the Primera División. Gamal joined Ángeles de Puebla before joining Tigres de la UANL, the latter would win the Copa de México and he retiring in 1992.

== International career ==
Gamal made two appearances for the Mexico national football team from 1984 to 1985. His debut with the senior team was a friendly against the United States. He also played for Mexico at the 1981 FIFA World Youth Championship in Australia.

== Personal life ==
After he retired from playing, Gamal became a youth football coach. He has worked with Tigres' youth teams.

Aaron Gamal died on 16 March 2021 from a heart attack. He was 62 years old.
