= 1962–63 Mexican Segunda División season =

Segunda División de México
- Season: 1962–63
- Champions: Zacatepec (2nd Title)
- Matches played: 240
- Goals scored: 737 (3.07 per match)

The 1962–63 Mexican Segunda División was the 13th season of the Mexican Segunda División. The season started on 30 June 1962 and concluded on 20 January 1963. It was won by Zacatepec.

== Changes ==
- UNAM was promoted to Primera División.
- Zacatepec was relegated from Primera División.
- After Week 13 U. de N.L. changed owners and was renamed as Nuevo León.

== Teams ==
1962-63 Season Teams

Club	City	Stadium
Cataluña	Torreón	Estadio San Isidro
Celaya	Celaya	Estadio Miguel Alemán Valdés
Cruz Azul	Jasso	Estadio 10 de Diciembre
La Piedad	La Piedad	Estadio Juan N. López
Laguna	Torreón	Estadio San Isidro
Orizaba	Orizaba	Estadio Socum
Pachuca	Pachuca	Estadio Revolución Mexicana
Poza Rica	Poza Rica	Parque Jaime J. Merino
Refinería Madero	Ciudad Madero	Estadio Tampico
Tepic	Tepic	Estadio Nicolás Álvarez Ortega
Texcoco	Texcoco	Estadio Municipal de Texcoco
U. de N.L.-Nuevo León	Monterrey	Estadio Tecnológico
Veracruz	Veracruz	Parque Deportivo Veracruzano
Ciudad Victoria	Ciudad Victoria	Estadio Marte R. Gómez
Zacatepec	Zacatepec	Campo del Ingenio
Zamora	Zamora	Estadio Moctezuma

== League table ==
Pos	Team	Pld	W	D	L	GF	GA	GAv	Pts	Qualification or relegation
1	Zacatepec (C, P)	30	19	6	5	47	20	2.350	44	Promoted to Primera División
2	Refinería Madero	30	17	9	4	58	30	1.933	43	
3	Poza Rica	30	18	6	6	76	33	2.303	42	
4	Pachuca	30	16	8	6	61	37	1.649	40	
5	Cruz Azul	30	15	5	10	58	41	1.415	35	
6	Orizaba	30	15	5	10	52	42	1.238	35	
7	Laguna	30	12	9	9	55	50	1.100	33	
8	U. de N.L. - Nuevo León	30	13	5	12	53	52	1.019	31	
9	Tepic	30	9	9	12	41	50	0.820	27	
10	Veracruz	30	10	7	13	43	55	0.782	27	
11	Cataluña	30	8	7	15	41	52	0.788	23	
12	Zamora	30	6	11	13	34	56	0.607	23	
13	Celaya	30	5	12	13	29	50	0.580	22	
14	La Piedad	30	7	7	16	28	42	0.667	21	
15	Ciudad Victoria	30	5	9	16	39	64	0.609	19	
16	Texcoco	30	5	5	20	22	63	0.349	15	

Source: RSSSF
(C) Champions; (P) Promoted

== Results ==
Home \ Away	CAT	CEL	CAZ	LPD	LAG	ORI	PAC	PZR	RMA	TEP	TEX	UNL	VER	VIC	ZAC	ZAM
Cataluña	—	5–0	0–1	3–1	0–0	3–2	1–0	0–4	2–3	2–6	3–1	1–1	1–1	3–0	0–1	1–1
Celaya	2–2	—	2–1	0–1	5–1	0–3	2–2	1–1	1–1	1–2	1–1	1–1	0–1	3–0	0–1	1–1
Cruz Azul	2–1	3–0	—	4–2	2–0	3–0	1–1	3–2	1–2	3–1	4–1	2–1	4–1	3–0	1–3	4–0
La Piedad	3–1	0–1	0–0	—	2–1	1–2	0–1	1–2	0–1	1–1	1–0	0–2	0–2	3–1	0–0	0–0
Laguna	2–3	2–0	3–0	4–1	—	3–1	1–1	3–2	2–2	1–1	5–0	1–0	3–0	3–2	1–2	3–0
Orizaba	4–1	2–1	1–1	3–0	2–1	—	0–1	1–0	2–2	2–1	0–0	3–1	2–0	3–2	1–1	1–0
Pachuca	1–0	2–0	2–1	3–1	2–3	3–2	—	3–3	1–1	4–1	4–1	6–1	3–0	3–0	3–1	5–0
Poza Rica	0–2	3–0	2–0	2–1	6–0	5–2	5–2	—	1–2	7–1	6–0	4–1	2–0	3–1	2–1	2–1
Refinería Madero	3–0	2–2	3–1	0–0	1–1	3–1	2–1	1–0	—	1–0	3–0	2–1	7–1	4–1	0–1	3–0
Tepic	1–0	0–0	2–4	1–3	1–1	1–2	0–1	0–0	2–2	—	2–0	1–0	2–1	1–2	1–2	2–1
Texcoco	2–1	1–2	1–2	2–2	1–2	2–1	0–0	0–3	0–1	2–3	—	1–2	2–0	2–1	0–3	0–0
U. de N.L. - Nuevo León	3–0	2–2	3–2	1–0	1–1	1–4	4–2	1–1	2–1	1–2	4–0	—	1–1	4–2	2–0	3–1
Veracruz	1–1	3–1	2–2	0–2	6–2	0–2	1–1	2–2	0–1	3–2	1–0	4–3	—	3–1	0–0	5–2
Ciudad Victoria	1–1	1–1	2–1	1–0	2–2	2–1	2–3	2–2	2–2	1–1	1–2	1–4	1–1	—	1–2	2–2
Zacatepec	2–1	4–0	2–1	0–0	2–1	1–0	3–0	0–2	1–0	1–1	3–0	5–1	1–0	2–0	—	3–0
Zamora	3–2	1–1	1–1	3–2	2–2	2–2	0–0	1–2	3–2	1–1	2–0	0–1	4–2	2–2	1–0	—

Source: RSSSF
Legend: Blue = home team win; Yellow = draw; Red = away team win.
