= Alacrán Jiménez =

Mexican footballer (1950–2025)

Personal information
- Full name: Alfredo Jiménez Ramírez
- Date of birth: 5 September 1951
- Place of birth: Mexico City, Mexico
- Date of death: 27 December 2022 (aged 71)
- Position: Center forward

Youth career
- 196?–1970: Monterrey

Senior career*
Years	Team	Apps	(Gls)
1970–1975	Monterrey		
1973–1974	→ Toluca (loan)		
1975–1976	Tigres UANL	38	(23)
1976–1978	Cruz Azul	55	(23)
1978–1981	Tigres UANL	54	(14)

International career
1971–1977	Mexico	22	(6)
- * Club domestic league appearances and goals

Alfredo Jiménez Ramírez (5 September 1951 – 27 December 2022) was a Mexican footballer. Nicknamed "Alacrán", he played as center forward for Monterrey, Tigres UANL and Cruz Azul throughout the 1970s. He also represented his home country of Mexico internationally for the 1977 CONCACAF Championship.

== Club career ==
Following his integration in their youth sector, he made his senior debut for Monterrey in the 1970–71 season under club manager Ignacio Jáuregui. He found immediate success with his first season, scoring 18 goals and remain with the club until the 1972–73 season. He was then loaned out to 1973–74 season before returning to Monterrey for their 1974–75 season following Toluca signing Ítalo Estupiñán. He arrived at Tigres UANL for their 1975–76 season where he scored 23 goals, battling with Pumas UNAM center forward Cabinho in the season final. He then played for Cruz Azul for two seasons before returning to Tigres for their 1978–79 season where they would win two consecutive titles upon his departure. He played until the 1980–81 season as he retired from professional football.

Despite not winning the Liga MX throughout his tenure with Tigres, he was a part of the winning squad of the 1975-76 Copa México and scored nine goals to become the tournament's top scorer. He also played in the final of the Copa against América during their football dynasty. During the final, he'd man-mark several players by fouling Argentinian central defender Miguel Ángel Cornero as well as injuring Brazilian midfielder Lola, allowing Pájaro Manzotti to score the second goal in the match. He was also part of the runners-up squad for the 1979–80 Mexican Primera División where he played in the finals following the substitution of Roberto Gómez Junco and scored the second goal following a pass from Edu.

== International career ==
Jiménez represented Mexico throughout the 1977 CONCACAF Championship as well as in several friendlies against Argentina following his successful 1970–71 season, making 22 total appearances and scoring 6 goals.

== Early and personal life ==
Jiménez was born on 5 September 1951 at Mexico City and when he was young, he moved to Monterrey with his parents and his brother. He was given the nickname "El hijo del general" by sports journalist Ángel Fernández Rugama. Playing as a central forward, his style was defined with determination and aggression without many flaws, securing complete control of the ball. Following his retirement from professional football, he went into acting such as in the 1983 film Cazador de asesinos in where, following pursuit, his character was killed on the railways. He later played in the 1984 film Los Peseros in where following another chase, he is arrested in the Santa Catarina River. He had also graduated from the Universidad Autónoma de Nuevo León where he later worked as a law firm coordinator.

Jiménez died on 27 December 2022 following kidney complications dating back to 2017.
