= Francisco I. Madero Refinery =

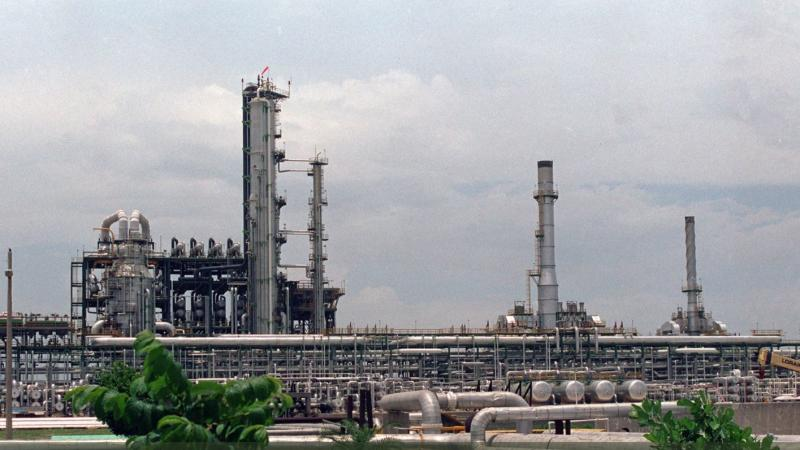
- Francisco I. Madero Refinery

- Location within Mexico
- Location: Ciudad Madero, Tamaulipas, Mexico; 22°16′13″N 97°48′23″W

Refinery details
- Operator: PEMEX
- Owner: PEMEX
- Opened: 1914
- Capacity: 186,000 barrels per day (29,600 m^{3}/d)

The Francisco I. Madero Refinery is an oil refinery located in Ciudad Madero, Tamaulipas, "founded in 1914 by the company El Águila", is currently owned and operated by Pemex, and is one of six refineries of Mexico.
