= Superintendencia Financiera de Colombia =

Colombian government agency

Financial Superintendence of Colombia
- Superintendencia Financiera de Colombia
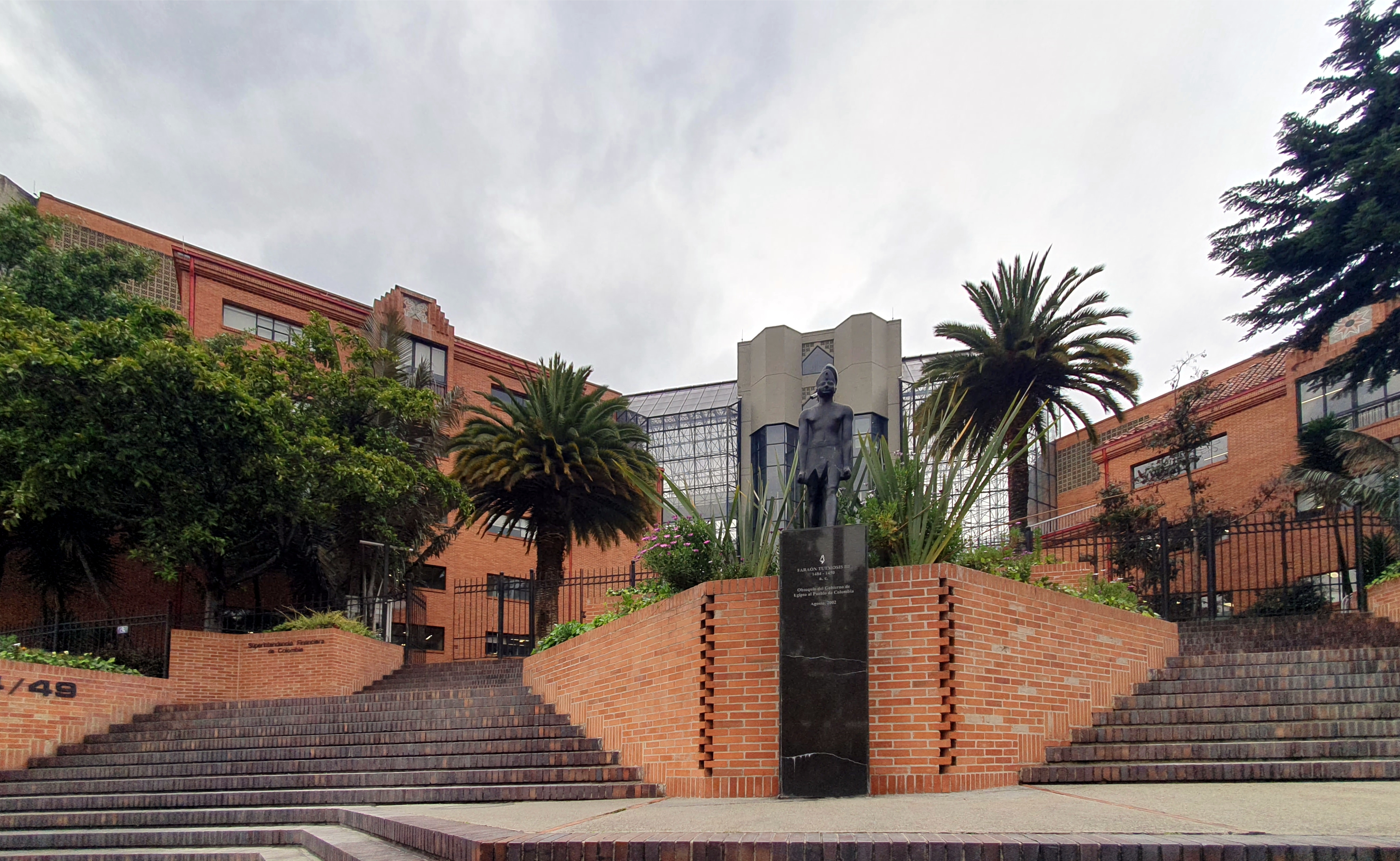
- Building of the Superintendencia in Bogotá

Agency overview
- Formed: 1923
- Jurisdiction: Republic of Colombia
- Headquarters: Bogotá
- Website: www.superfinanciera.gov.co

The Superintendencia Financiera de Colombia (SFC), or Superfinanciera, is the Colombian government agency responsible for overseeing financial regulation and market systems in order to preserve stability, security and confidence, and to promote, organize and develop the securities market. It is also mandated to provide investor protection for depositors and policyholders.

== History ==
The agency was established in 1923 as a banking regulator, by Law 45. Article 19 of this law appointed a Chief Superintendent of Banking to head the agency and charged him with the monitoring of all banking institutions. In 2005, the agency was merged with the securities regulator, with the added functions of inspection, monitoring and control of persons involved in the following sectors: financial, securities, insurance and any other related to the management and investment of resources collected from the public.

== See also ==
- List of financial supervisory authorities by country
