= Roberto Alderete =

Chilean footballer

Personal information
- Full name: Roberto Agustín Alderete Céspedes
- Date of birth: 28 August 1990 (age 36)
- Place of birth: Valdivia, Chile
- Position: Attacking midfielder

Youth career
- San Luis Valdivia

Senior career*
Years	Team	Apps	(Gls)
2008	Huachipato		
2009	Deportes Concepción	4	(0)
2010	O'Higgins		
2010	→ Rengo Unido (loan)		(3)
2011	Fernández Vial		
2012	Sol del Este		
2012	Selección Paranaense		
2013	Deportes Valdivia	6	(0)
- * Club domestic league appearances and goals

Roberto Agustín Alderete Céspedes (born 28 August 1990) is a Chilean former footballer who played as an attacking midfielder. Besides Chile, he played in Paraguay.

== Career ==
An attacking midfielder from Valdivia, Chile, as a youth player Alderete was with club San Luis. In his homeland, he played for Huachipato, Deportes Concepción, O'Higgins, Rengo Unido, Fernández Vial and Deportes Valdivia.

Abroad, he had a stint with Sol del Este in Paraguay, also representing the Selección Paranaense, the team of the local league.

After his retirement, he went on playing football at amateur level for clubs such as Virginio Gómez and Atlético Merino.

== Personal life ==
He graduated as a topographer.
