= 1991–92 Mexican Primera División season =

50th professional season of the top-flight football league in Mexico

Primera División de México
- Season: 1991–92
- Champions: León (5th title)
- Relegated: Cobras
- Champions' Cup: León; Puebla
- Matches: 398
- Goals: 985 (2.47 per match)

The following statistics encompass the 1991–92 Primera División de México season.

== Overview ==
It was contested by 20 teams, and the León won the championship.

Atlante F.C. was promoted from Segunda División.

Starting in 1991–92, there was a change in the system of relegation to the Segunda División. The so-called "relegation table" was implemented, in which the points obtained in the last two seasons were divided between the games played in the current season to obtain a coefficient.

This is the relegation system used by Primera Div./Liga MX to this day. The difference is in that due to the change in the calendar which allowed for shorter tournaments, it encompasses the past five seasons (equivalent to about 2.5 years' worth of league games).

The club that was known at the time as Cobras de Ciudad Juárez was relegated to Segunda División, it was the first team relegated with the relegation table system.

=== Teams ===
Location of the 1991-92 Primera División teams

Team	City	Stadium
América	Mexico City	Azteca
Atlante	Mexico City	Azulgrana
Atlas	Guadalajara, Jalisco	Jalisco
Cobras	Ciudad Juárez, Chihuahua	Olímpico Benito Juárez
Cruz Azul	Mexico City	Azteca
Guadalajara	Guadalajara, Jalisco	Jalisco
León	León, Guanajuato	Nou Camp
Morelia	Morelia, Michoacán	Morelos
Monterrey	Monterrey, Nuevo León	Tecnológico
Necaxa	Mexico City	Azteca
Puebla	Puebla, Puebla	Cuauhtémoc
Querétaro	Querétaro, Querétaro	Corregidora
Santos Laguna	Torreón, Coahuila	Corona
Tecos	Zapopan, Jalisco	Tres de Marzo
Toluca	Toluca, State of Mexico	Toluca 70-86
UANL	Monterrey, Nuevo León	Universitario
UAT	Ciudad Victoria, Tamaulipas	Estadio Marte R. Gómez
UdeG	Guadalajara, Jalisco	Jalisco
UNAM	Mexico City	Olímpico Universitario
Veracruz	Veracruz, Veracruz	Luis "Pirata" Fuente

== Group stage ==
=== Group 1 ===
Pos	Team	Pld	W	D	L	GF	GA	GD	Pts	Qualification or relegation
1	UNAM	38	15	14	9	53	41	+12	44	Playoff
2	Veracruz	38	16	8	14	53	44	+9	40	Playoff
3	Atlas	38	9	17	12	37	38	−1	35	
4	Tecos	38	8	13	17	35	47	−12	29	
5	Cobras	38	5	10	23	33	60	−27	20	Relegated

=== Group 2 ===
Pos	Team	Pld	W	D	L	GF	GA	GD	Pts	Qualification
1	Guadalajara	38	13	19	6	41	31	+10	45	Playoff
2	Puebla	38	13	15	10	44	42	+2	41	Playoff
3	Correcaminos	38	14	12	12	47	43	+4	40	Playoff
4	Monterrey	38	12	13	13	41	49	−8	37	
5	Querétaro	38	9	13	16	37	50	−13	31	

=== Group 3 ===
Pos	Team	Pld	W	D	L	GF	GA	GD	Pts	Qualification
1	Necaxa	38	16	14	8	67	46	+21	46	Playoff
2	León	38	15	15	8	47	38	+9	45	Playoff
3	Cruz Azul	38	15	14	9	60	52	+8	44	Playoff
4	Toluca	38	13	12	13	47	49	−2	38	
5	Santos	38	12	10	16	42	51	−9	34	

=== Group 4 ===
Pos	Team	Pld	W	D	L	GF	GA	GD	Pts	Qualification
1	Atlante	38	19	12	7	65	47	+18	50	Playoff
2	América	38	13	14	11	46	45	+1	40	Playoff
3	UANL	38	14	11	13	53	51	+2	39	
4	Morelia	38	10	15	13	41	47	−6	35	
5	U. de G.	38	8	11	19	42	60	−18	27	

== Results ==
Home \ Away	AME	ATE	ATS	COB	CAZ	GDL	LEO	MTY	MOR	NEC	PUE	QRO	SAN	TEC	TOL	UNL	UAT	UDG	UNM	VER
América	—	1–3	0–0	1–0	1–1	1–1	1–1	2–0	2–2	1–5	2–2	3–1	3–0	2–0	3–2	0–0	1–1	1–0	0–1	2–0
Atlante	1–0	—	1–1	2–0	1–1	1–1	2–2	3–0	1–0	1–3	1–0	2–1	2–2	3–0	1–0	2–0	2–0	0–0	4–2	1–2
Atlas	1–0	2–2	—	1–1	0–1	2–2	0–0	0–1	1–1	0–0	0–0	1–1	0–0	1–1	1–1	2–1	4–1	2–2	1–0	1–2
Cobras	0–1	2–3	1–3	—	1–1	1–1	0–1	2–0	2–3	2–0	0–1	0–0	4–0	0–0	0–1	0–0	0–0	1–5	1–1	1–1
Cruz Azul	1–1	3–1	1–1	2–3	—	2–4	3–1	2–2	1–0	1–4	2–2	3–1	1–0	2–1	2–3	2–1	2–2	1–1	1–2	2–1
Guadalajara	0–0	1–1	1–0	2–1	1–1	—	4–1	0–0	2–0	1–1	1–1	2–0	1–0	1–1	1–0	3–1	1–0	1–1	0–0	2–0
León	1–0	2–0	3–0	1–0	2–2	4–0	—	1–1	2–2	3–1	0–0	1–0	1–1	3–1	1–0	1–1	2–2	3–2	2–1	3–1
Monterrey	2–1	2–2	2–1	3–1	2–1	1–1	2–0	—	1–1	4–0	1–1	1–1	2–1	2–0	0–0	0–1	0–0	4–1	1–4	3–2
Morelia	0–0	2–2	1–0	2–1	0–2	2–0	0–0	2–0	—	0–0	0–0	2–1	2–2	2–1	1–1	1–0	2–3	2–1	2–5	0–0
Necaxa	2–1	1–2	1–1	3–1	0–1	1–1	0–0	5–1	0–0	—	1–0	2–2	4–1	2–1	4–0	3–2	2–0	3–0	1–1	1–1
Puebla	3–1	2–3	1–2	3–1	2–1	1–0	1–0	0–0	1–1	1–0	—	3–0	2–2	1–1	0–3	1–1	1–0	2–0	1–1	1–0
Querétaro	3–3	2–3	0–3	0–1	0–3	0–0	1–0	1–0	2–1	1–0	1–1	—	2–0	1–1	1–0	2–2	0–0	5–2	2–0	2–3
Santos	0–1	0–1	0–0	2–0	1–2	2–1	4–1	2–0	3–1	0–2	1–1	1–0	—	4–1	3–1	2–0	1–0	2–1	0–1	2–1
Tecos	0–1	2–2	1–0	2–0	1–2	0–0	0–1	4–0	3–2	2–2	1–2	0–0	1–0	—	0–1	0–0	0–0	2–1	2–2	1–0
Toluca	2–2	4–2	1–0	3–1	1–1	1–1	1–1	1–0	1–1	3–3	0–2	0–0	1–1	3–1	—	3–0	3–1	1–0	2–2	1–0
UANL	3–2	1–0	2–3	1–0	3–1	1–1	3–1	1–1	0–2	1–2	3–1	3–1	2–2	0–2	2–0	—	2–0	4–1	2–0	2–1
UAT	5–1	2–3	2–1	1–0	1–1	1–0	4–0	1–0	1–0	2–2	3–2	0–1	2–0	0–0	1–0	4–1	—	4–0	3–1	1–3
U. de G.	0–1	1–1	0–1	1–1	1–2	0–1	0–0	2–0	1–0	1–2	2–0	1–0	4–0	1–0	3–2	2–2	2–2	—	0–0	1–1
UNAM	0–2	0–2	2–0	3–1	2–2	1–0	0–0	0–0	2–1	1–1	3–0	2–1	0–0	2–1	3–0	1–3	0–0	4–0	—	2–1
Veracruz	1–1	2–1	1–0	5–2	1–0	0–1	0–1	1–2	2–0	5–3	3–1	0–0	2–0	1–0	3–0	1–1	2–0	2–1	1–1	—

Updated to match(es) played on 10 May 1992. Source: RSSSF
Legend: Blue = home team win; Yellow = draw; Red = away team win.

== Playoff ==
=== Repechaje round ===
- América 2-0; 0-4 Cruz Azul
- UAT 2-1; 1-4 Veracruz

Quarter-finals
4	León	1	1	2
5	UNAM	0	0	0
1	Atlante	3	2	5
6	Cruz Azul (a)	1	4	5
2	Necaxa	2	4	6
8	Veracruz	2	0	2
3	Guadalajara	1	2	3
7	Puebla	3	1	4

Semi-finals
4	León (a)	1	2	3
6	Cruz Azul	3	0	3
2	Necaxa	2	0	2
7	Puebla	3	0	3

Final
4	León	0	2	2
7	Puebla	0	0	0

=== Final ===
June 4, 1992

Puebla	0-0	León
	Report

Estadio Cuauhtémoc, Puebla
June 7, 1992

León	2-0 (a.e.t.)	Puebla
Carlos Turrubiates 105'; Aurelio Rivera 112' (own)	Report

Nou Camp, León

León won 2-0 on aggregate.

1991-92 winners

5th title

== Relegation table ==
Pos.	Team	Pts.	Pld.	Ave.	GD.
16.	U. de G.	70	76	0.9211	-11
17.	Tecos	62	76	0.8158	-20
18.	Querétaro	61	76	0.8026	-21
19.	Santos Laguna	60	76	0.7895	-27
20.	Cobras	52	76	0.6842	-42
