= Carlos Eloir Perucci =

Brazilian footballer

Personal information
- Full name: Carlos Eloir Perucci Riveiro
- Date of birth: 20 May 1951
- Place of birth: Curitiba, Brazil
- Date of death: 26 September 2017 (aged 66)
- Place of death: Curitiba, Brazil
- Position: Forward

Senior career*
Years	Team	Apps	(Gls)
1970–1972	Atlético Paranaense		
1972–1977	Laguna	149	(86)
1977–1980	Atlético Español		
1980	Houston Hurricane	25	(9)
1981	Atlético Español		
1981–1985	Cruz Azul	49	(30)
- * Club domestic league appearances and goals as of 24 March 2024

Carlos Eloir Perucci (born 20 May 1951) was a Brazilian professional footballer who played as a forward.

== Career ==
Started his career at Athletico Paranaense, Perucci became one of the top scorers in the history of Primera Divisíon/Liga MX with 197 goals scored for C.D. Laguna, Atlético Español and Cruz Azul.

He also played for the Houston Hurricane of the NASL in 1980 with 25 appearances and 9 goals.

== Death ==
Perucci died in Curitiba, on 26 September 2017.
