= Roberto Gómez Junco =

Mexican footballer (1950–2025)

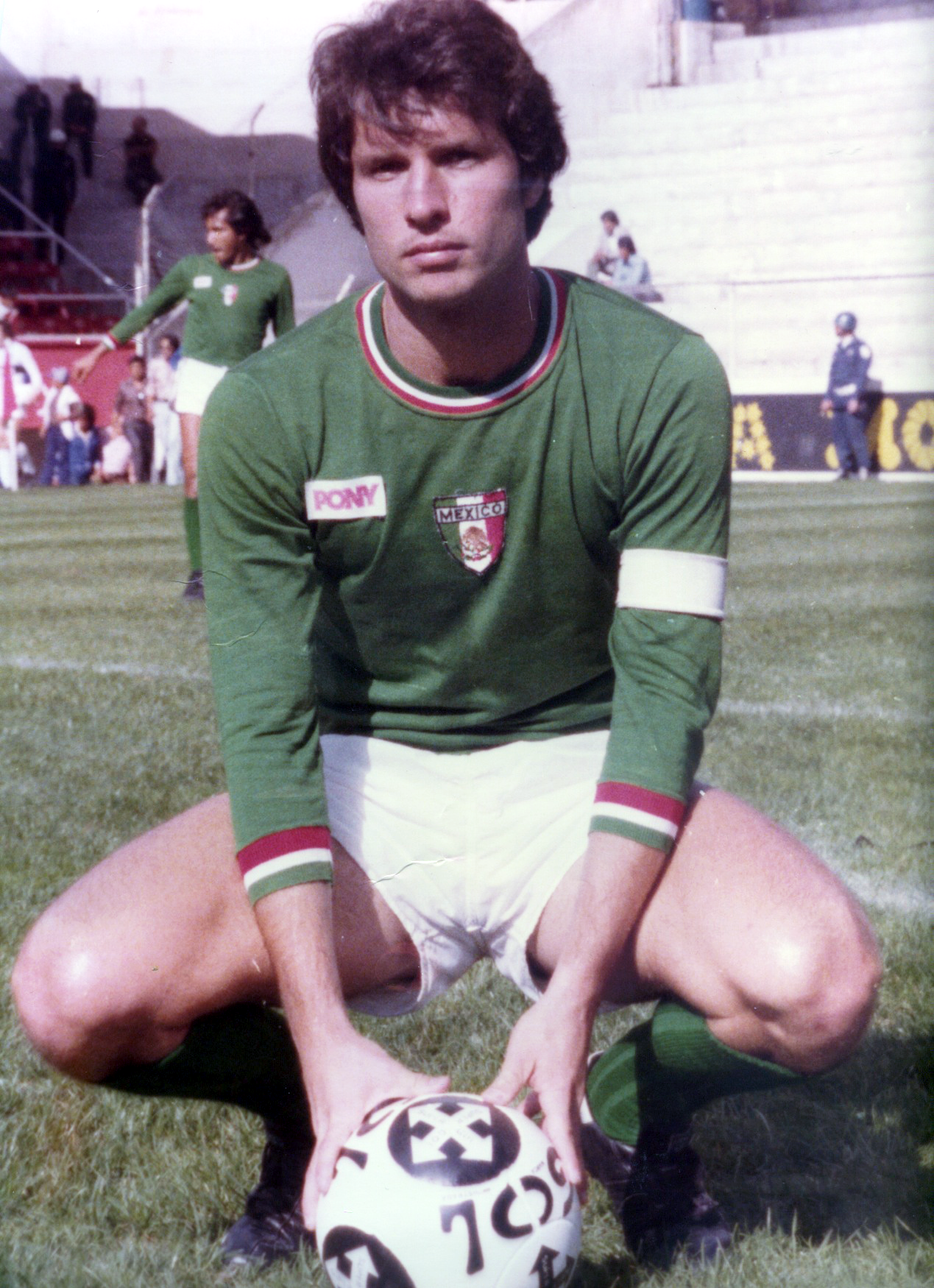
- Gómez Junco in 1980

Personal information
- Full name: Roberto Luis Gómez Junco Livas
- Date of birth: 12 March 1956 (age 70)
- Place of birth: Monterrey, Nuevo León, Mexico
- Position: Midfielder

Senior career*
Years	Team	Apps	(Gls)
1975–1977	Atlético Español	18	(1)
1977–1980	Tigres UANL	100	(12)
1980–1982	Monterrey	69	(9)
1982–1984	Guadalajara	77	(7)
1984–1986	Toluca		
1986–1988	Tigres UANL	45	(0)

International career
1980	Mexico	1	(0)
- * Club domestic league appearances and goals

Roberto Luis Gómez Junco Livas (born 12 March 1956) is a Mexican sports journalist, writer and retired footballer. As a midfielder, he played for various clubs including Tigres UANL, Monterrey and Guadalajara throughout the 1970s and the 1980s. He currently works for ESPN Deportes.

== Club career ==
Gómez Junco began his professional career with Atlético Español, for whom he made his debut in the Mexican Primera División in a home game against Club León in a 3–1 victory on 9 May 1976, in which he came on as a substitute for Saúl Rivero in the 75th minute. He scored his first goal in the top-flight of Mexican football exactly five months later on 9 October 1976 against his future club Tigres UANL, where he scored the goal to make it 2-0 for the visitors in the 73rd minute. After the end of the 1976–77 season, he moved to Tigres, with whom he was under contract for the next three years and with whom he won the first league title in their history during the 1977–78 Mexican Primera División. Over the course of his professional career, Roberto Gómez was sent off ten times. He received his first red card on 5 May 1979 in the match between the Tigres and Atlante that ended in a 0-0 draw with his tenth and last red card occurring on 16 August 1986 in the match between Tigres and Tampico Madero that ended 2-1.

When Gómez left Tigres in the summer of 1980, he moved to their arch-rivals Monterrey, where he was under contract until 1982. In his native city, he also experienced his most accurate season in the 1981–82 season, in which he scored seven goals. He then moved to play for Guadalajara in which his two seasons saw the club reach runners-up twice. He spent the following two seasons with Toluca before returning to Tigres where he ended his career following the 1987–88 season.

== International career ==
Gómez Junco would make his only international appearance in a friendly on 20 March 1980 against South Korea in where El tricolor would lose 1–0.

== Journalist career ==
Following his retirement as a player, Gómez Junco began his career as a sports commentator for state broadcasting company Imevisión which was under José Ramón Fernández. Following the privatization of the company into Televisión Azteca, Gómez Junco continued his tenure until 2004, covering every edition of the FIFA World Cup since 1992 until the 2002 FIFA World Cup. He'd also be invited to the television program Los protagonistas as well as contribute to DeporTV.

Upon his departure of TV Azteca in February 2007, he was contracted by Televisa to join their sports sector, with this decision being a controversial one amongst his fans. He career with the club saw him cover every match of the Liga MX up to that point as well as the 2010 FIFA World Cup. In August 2012, he announced his departure from Televisa following his five years with the company. In September, it was announced that Gómez Junco would work for ESPN Deportes to cover football as well as reunite with José Ramón Fernández. He'd form a part of the Futbol Picante program as well as collaborate with Los Capitanes and ESPN Radio Fórmula. He'd also participate in analyzing Liga MX and UEFA Champions League matches.

Since January 1989, he had also worked as a sports journalist for El Norte of Nuevo León. With the launch of Reforma in Mexico City as well as Mural in Jalisco within the "Cancha" section of the newspaper.

== Writing career ==
In October 2017, he debuted as a writer with the publishing of his first novel, El Ilustre Pigmeo, a literature and football novel about the works of his great-grandfather Celedonio Junco de la Vega as well as the concepts and his personal reflections of football. In June 2018, he published the hendecasyllable Méjico Esdrúxulo which recalled the history of Mexico.[9] In October that same year, Gómez Junco would publish his second novel Los Crimencitos Impunes by Kuna Ediciones. The novel pertains to football and politics with it telling the story of six footballers united by their friendship, their desires to triumph as players and the several murders that occur around them.
