= Mario Medina =

Mexican footballer (born 1952)

Personal information
- Full name: Mario Medina Rojas
- Date of birth: 2 September 1952 (age 74)
- Place of birth: Mexico City, Mexico
- Position: Forward

Senior career*
Years	Team	Apps	(Gls)
1972–1981	Toluca	155	(20)
1981–1982	Cruz Azul	4	(0)
1982–1983	Monterrey	19	(0)

International career
1975–1980	Mexico	18	(2)
- * Club domestic league appearances and goals

Mario Medina Rojas (born 2 September 1952) is a Mexican former football forward who played for Mexico in the 1978 FIFA World Cup. He also played for Deportivo Toluca.
