= Guillermo Huerta =

Mexican footballer and manager (born 1966)

Personal information
- Full name: Guillermo Huerta Huitrón
- Date of birth: 3 July 1966 (age 60)
- Place of birth: Mexico City, Mexico
- Height: 1.80 m (5 ft 11 in)
- Position: Defender

Senior career*
Years	Team	Apps	(Gls)
1984–1992	América	138	(7)
1993–1995	Atlético Morelia	12	(1)

International career
1985	Mexico U20	4	(0)
1988	Mexico	3	(0)

Managerial career
- 2004: Tigrillos Coapa (Assistant)
- 2009–2011: América Reserves and Academy
- 2011: América(Assistant)
- 2011–2013: América Reserves and Academy
- 2013–2014: Zacatepec
- 2017: Puebla
- 2017–2019: América Reserves and Academy
- * Club domestic league appearances and goals

Guillermo Huerta Huitrón (born 3 July 1966) is a Mexican football manager and former player.

He played primarily the technical assist position. He managed Atlético Zacatepec during the 2013–14 Ascenso MX season.

Huerta also played three senior caps with the Mexico national team in the late 1980s.
