= Juan Carlos Czentoriky =

Argentine footballer (1946–2017)

Personal information
- Date of birth: 13 January 1946
- Place of birth: Rosario, Santa Fe, Argentina
- Date of death: 29 May 2017 (aged 71)
- Position: Midfielder

Senior career*
Years	Team	Apps	(Gls)
1968–1971	San Telmo	90	(35)
1971–1972	Jalisco		
1975–1977	Curtidores	69	(13)
1977–1978	Puebla	10	(0)
- * Club domestic league appearances and goals

Juan Carlos Czentoriky (13 January 1946 – 29 May 2017) was an Argentine football player.

== Career ==
Czentoriky began his playing career with Argentine second division club San Telmo. He made his professional debut against Argentino de Quilmes on 9 March 1968, and would make 90 league appearances for the club, scoring 35 goals.

In 1971, Czentoriky joined México Primera División side Club Jalisco. He would later play for Unión de Curtidores, Puebla F.C. and Orinegros from Ciudad Madero in the Mexican league.
