= 1987–88 Mexican Primera División season =

46th professional season of the top-flight football league in Mexico

Primera División de México
- Season: 1987–88
- Champions: América (7th title)
- Relegated: Correcaminos
- Champions' Cup: UNAM; UDG
- Matches: 394
- Goals: 1,176 (2.98 per match)

Statistics of Mexican Primera División in season 1987–88.

== Overview ==
It was contested by 20 teams, and América won the championship.

Correcaminos UAT was promoted from Segunda División.

=== Teams ===
Location of the 1987–88 Primera División teams

Team	City	Stadium
América	Mexico City	Azteca
Ángeles	Puebla, Puebla	Cuauhtémoc
Atlante	Mexico City	Azulgrana
Atlas	Guadalajara, Jalisco	Jalisco
Atlético Potosino	San Luis Potosí, S.L.P.	Plan de San Luis
Cruz Azul	Mexico City	Azteca
Guadalajara	Guadalajara, Jalisco	Jalisco
Irapuato	Irapuato, Guanajuato	Irapuato
Morelia	Morelia, Michoacán	Venustiano Carranza
Monterrey	Monterrey, Nuevo León	Tecnológico
Necaxa	Mexico City	Azteca
Neza	Nezahualcóyotl, State of Mexico	Neza 86
Puebla	Puebla, Puebla	Cuauhtémoc
Tampico Madero	Tampico–Madero, Tamaulipas	Tamaulipas
Tecos	Zapopan, Jalisco	Tres de Marzo
Toluca	Toluca, State of Mexico	Toluca 70-86
UANL	Monterrey, Nuevo León	Universitario
UAT	Ciudad Victoria, Tamaulipas	Estadio Marte R. Gómez
UdeG	Guadalajara, Jalisco	Jalisco
UNAM	Mexico City	Olímpico Universitario

== Moves ==
After the season Correcaminos bought the Deportivo Neza franchise in order to remain in Primera División.

Ángeles was sold and transferred to Torreón and was made into Santos.

== Group stage ==
=== Group 1 ===
Pos	Team	Pld	W	D	L	GF	GA	GD	Pts	Qualification
1	Guadalajara	38	17	12	9	54	35	+19	46	Playoff
2	UNAM	38	15	15	8	82	55	+27	45	Playoff
3	Atlante	38	15	10	13	68	62	+6	40	
4	Tampico Madero	38	7	18	13	50	62	−12	32	
5	Ángeles	38	9	12	17	57	79	−22	30	

Source: rsssf.com

=== Group 2 ===
Pos	Team	Pld	W	D	L	GF	GA	GD	Pts	Qualification
1	U de G.	38	20	10	8	77	48	+29	50	Playoff
2	Tecos	38	18	10	10	59	41	+18	46	Playoff
3	Cruz Azul	38	14	12	12	58	56	+2	40	
4	Atlas	38	11	12	15	62	71	−9	34	
5	Atlético Potosino	38	7	15	16	34	55	−21	29	

Source: rsssf.com

=== Group 3 ===
Pos	Team	Pld	W	D	L	GF	GA	GD	Pts	Qualification
1	América	38	24	7	7	86	39	+47	55	Playoff
2	Puebla	38	13	12	13	58	51	+7	38	Playoff
3	Necaxa	38	12	13	13	49	64	−15	37	
4	Deportivo Neza	38	12	11	15	46	60	−14	35	
5	Irapuato	38	12	7	19	40	67	−27	31	

Source: rsssf.com

=== Group 4 ===
Pos	Team	Pld	W	D	L	GF	GA	GD	Pts	Qualification or relegation
1	Morelia	38	14	13	11	58	43	+15	41	Playoff
2	Toluca	38	16	7	15	49	50	−1	39	Playoff
3	UANL	38	12	8	18	51	65	−14	32	
4	Monterrey	38	9	13	16	55	65	−10	31	
5	Correcaminos	38	10	9	19	39	64	−25	29	Relegated

Source: rsssf.com

== Results ==
Home \ Away	AME	ANG	ATN	ATL	APO	CRA	GDL	IRA	MTY	MOR	NEC	NEZ	PUE	TAM	TEC	TOL	UAT	UNL	UDG	UNM
América		2–2	4–5	3–0	3–0	2–2	1–0	5–0	4–0	4–1	1–1	3–0	2–1	1–0	0–2	2–0	3–0	6–3	1–0	2–2
Ángeles	0–3		1–4	2–1	3–2	1–1	1–1	1–0	2–2	0–2	5–3	1–1	3–3	2–1	3–0	1–3	1–1	3–2	2–0	2–3
Atlante	0–1	0–2		2–1	3–3	2–3	2–1	4–1	1–1	0–0	1–2	3–3	3–0	3–1	2–2	3–0	2–0	4–1	1–0	1–2
Atlas	2–2	5–3	4–1		3–3	2–1	1–1	3–1	1–3	1–0	2–2	4–0	1–0	3–1	2–0	0–2	1–1	3–0	1–3	1–3
Atlético Potosino	1–1	1–1	0–0	1–1		1–2	0–2	1–0	2–0	1–0	0–2	1–2	1–0	1–1	1–0	3–3	1–0	0–0	0–2	0–0
Cruz Azul	2–4	0–0	1–2	3–1	3–1		1–2	4–1	2–0	3–0	2–1	2–2	1–0	1–0	1–2	2–1	0–0	2–1	1–1	1–1
Guadalajara	3–2	2–1	0–0	3–1	2–0	0–2		3–0	4–1	1–1	0–0	1–0	1–0	5–1	0–0	3–3	3–1	2–1	1–2	0–0
Irapuato	1–0	2–2	3–1	3–1	3–1	2–1	0–3		1–0	0–0	1–3	1–1	1–2	2–1	2–0	0–0	2–0	2–1	0–1	0–0
Monterrey	1–2	1–1	1–2	5–2	1–1	3–2	0–1	1–3		1–1	0–0	4–0	3–4	1–1	2–0	2–2	4–2	2–1	1–1	3–1
Morelia	0–2	5–0	3–0	6–0	3–0	2–2	1–1	2–0	0–2		3–4	0–1	2–1	3–0	0–0	0–0	1–0	0–0	2–1	3–2
Necaxa	1–3	4–3	3–2	2–5	2–2	0–0	0–0	2–0	1–1	1–1		1–0	0–1	1–1	0–4	0–2	2–0	2–1	1–3	2–4
Deportivo Neza	0–2	2–1	2–1	0–0	2–1	2–0	1–1	5–0	1–0	3–2	0–0		1–1	3–3	2–0	2–4	2–0	2–4	1–1	0–4
Puebla	0–2	2–0	1–1	4–2	1–1	2–0	4–2	0–0	1–0	3–1	6–1	2–1		1–1	2–2	2–2	2–1	4–0	1–2	2–2
Tampico Madero	1–0	4–2	2–2	1–1	1–1	3–1	2–2	2–1	2–2	2–1	0–0	4–1	2–2		1–2	1–1	0–0	1–4	0–1	1–1
Tecos	1–0	2–0	2–1	2–0	0–0	4–1	1–0	3–1	0–0	0–1	0–1	3–1	2–1	0–1		2–1	4–1	3–0	1–1	3–1
Toluca	1–3	3–1	1–2	2–1	1–0	1–1	0–1	1–1	2–1	0–2	4–1	2–1	1–0	2–0	1–0		2–0	3–0	1–3	3–2
Correcaminos	2–4	2–1	1–3	0–0	0–1	2–2	1–0	2–1	3–2	1–1	3–1	0–1	2–0	1–1	1–0	1–0		4–1	2–5	3–1
UANL	1–1	3–0	2–1	1–1	3–1	1–1	1–2	0–1	2–1	1–1	0–1	1–0	0–0	3–2	2–2	2–0	3–0		1–0	2–1
UDG	2–1	3–0	2–2	1–1	1–0	5–2	1–0	6–2	3–3	3–5	2–0	2–0	2–0	3–3	4–0	2–3	1–1	5–1		1–1
UNAM	1–4	3–3	5–1	3–3	3–0	1–2	1–0	4–1	6–0	2–2	1–1	0–0	2–2	1–1	3–1	2–0	5–0	3–1	5–3	

Source: rsssf.com
Legend: Blue = home team win; Yellow = draw; Red = away team win.

== Playoff ==
Quarter-finals
1	América	2	4	6
10	Puebla	2	0	2
3	Guadalajara	0	1	1
6	Morelia	1	2	3
2	U. de G.	1	1	2
9	Toluca	0	0	0
4	Tecos	1	0	1
5	UNAM	4	2	6

Semi-finals
1	América (p.)	2	3	5 (3)
6	Morelia	2	3	5 (1)
2	U. de G.	2	1	3
5	UNAM	2	2	4

Final
1	América	0	4	4
5	UNAM	1	1	2

1987–88 winners

7th title
