= Omar Mendiburu =

Mexican footballer

Personal information
- Full name: José Omar Mendiburu Cruz
- Date of birth: 24 April 1960
- Place of birth: Mexico City, Mexico
- Date of death: 7 March 2025 (aged 64)
- Place of death: Mexico City, Mexico
- Height: 1.80 m (5 ft 11 in)
- Position: Forward

Senior career*
Years	Team	Apps	(Gls)
1978–1981	Cruz Azul	41	(8)
1981–1983	Neza	28	(7)
1983–1984	Oaxtepec	26	(6)
1984–1986	UANL	30	(4)
1986–1988	Puebla	54	(13)
1988–1989	UANL	7	(2)
1989–1990	Tampico Madero	?	(1)

International career
1979	Mexico U20	3	(0)
- * Club domestic league appearances and goals

José Omar Mendiburu Cruz (24 April 1960 – 7 March 2025) was a Mexican professional footballer who played as forward. He played 13 seasons in the Mexican Primera División with Cruz Azul (where he won the 1979–80 and 1980-81 championships), Deportivo Neza, Oaxtepec, Tigres UANL, Puebla and Tampico Madero. He also represented Mexico at the 1979 FIFA World Youth Championship.

== Early career ==
Mendiburu was born on 24 April 1960 in Colonia Guerrero, Mexico City. He started playing football in the Deportivo Plan Sexenal, a sports center in the Miguel Hidalgo borough. He joined the academy of Cruz Azul in 1972. He won the 1977–78 reserves championship and finished as the top scorer of the tournament with 27 goals.

== Club career ==
Mendiburu made his professional debut with Cruz Azul during the 1978–79 Mexican Primera División season. He won back-to-back championships with Cruz Azul in the 1979–80 and 1980–81 seasons, playing a key role in the team’s attack. In 1981, he transferred to Deportivo Neza, where he played the next two seasons. In 1983, he joined Oaxtepec for the club’s final season, scoring the last goal in the team’s history on 12 May 1984 at the Estadio Olímpico de Oaxtepec against Leones Negros UdeG.

In 1984, he joined Tigres UANL, where he played until 1986. The next season he signed with Puebla, where he played 54 matches, scoring 13 goals and winning the 1987–88 Copa México. In 1988 he returned to Tigres UANL, and he played his last professional season in 1989–90 with Tampico Madero.

== International career ==
Mendiburu was part of the Mexican squad that participated in the 1979 FIFA World Youth Championship played in Japan. He started in two matches, against Algeria and Spain and played as a substitute against Japan.

== Death ==
On 11 November 2024, Mendiburu was hospitalized in the General Hospital of Mexico and required blood donations. He died on 7 March 2025 in Mexico City, aged 64.

== Honours ==
Cruz Azul

- Mexican Primera División: 1979–80, 1980–81

Puebla

- Copa México: 1987–88
