= Ítalo Estupiñán =

Ecuadorian footballer (1952–2016)

Personal information
- Full name: Ítalo Eugenio Estupiñán Martínez
- Date of birth: 1 January 1952
- Place of birth: Esmeraldas, Ecuador
- Date of death: 1 March 2016 (aged 64)
- Place of death: Toluca, State of Mexico, Mexico
- Height: 1.75 m (5 ft 9 in)
- Position: Forward

Senior career*
Years	Team	Apps	(Gls)
1970–1972	Macará		
1972–1974	El Nacional		
1974–1977	Toluca	63	(22)
1977–1979	América	15	(2)
1979–1980	Universidad Católica		
1980–1981	Atletas Campesinos	58	(16)
1981–1983	Puebla	40	(6)
1986	Emelec		
Total		176	(46)

International career
1972–1973	Ecuador	14	(4)
- * Club domestic league appearances and goals

Ítalo Eugenio Estupiñán Martínez (1 January 1952 – 1 March 2016) was an Ecuadorian footballer who played as a forward during his career.

== Club career ==
Born in Esmeraldas, Estupiñán began playing football for Club Social y Deportivo Macará and made his Ecuadorian Serie A debut at age 17. He would also play for Club Deportivo El Nacional and Club Sport Emelec in Ecuador's top division. He played several seasons in the Primera División de México with Deportivo Toluca F.C., Club América, Atlético Campesinos and Puebla F.C., winning the league with Toluca in 1974–75 and with Puebla in 1982–83.

=== Clubs ===
- Year Club App (Gls)*
- 1970–1971 Macara (Ecu)
- 1972–1973 CD El Nacional (Ecu)
- 1975–1976 Deportivo Toluca F.C. (Mex)
- 1977–1979 Club America (Mex)
- 1980 Universidad Católica (Quito)
- 1980–1981 Atletico Campesinos (Mex)
- 1982–1983 Puebla FC (Mex)
- 1986 Emelec (Ecu)

== International career ==
He obtained 14 caps for the Ecuador national football team during the 1980s, scoring 2 goals.

=== Ecuador ===
- 1986–1993 Ecuador 6 (2)

=== Club Titles ===
- Mexico
- Deportivo Toluca F.C.
  - Primera División: 1974/75
- Puebla F.C.
  - Primera División: 1982/83
- Club América
  - Interamerican Cup : 1977

=== Personal Titles ===
"Citlalli Price" for the best player of the year in 1974 (Mexico)

== Video ==
- Italo Estupiñan Video Toluca 1974 on YouTube (Spanish)
- Italo Estupiñan Video Puebla 1982 on YouTube (Spanish)
