= Daniel Bartolotta =

Uruguayan footballer (born 1955)

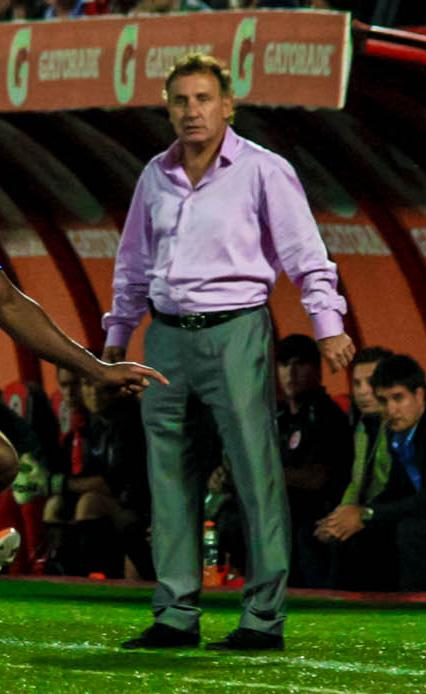

Personal information
- Full name: Daniel Roberto Bartolotta Pereyra
- Date of birth: 9 January 1955 (age 71)
- Place of birth: Montevideo, Uruguay
- Position: Striker

Senior career*
Years	Team	Apps	(Gls)
1972–1975	Defensor Sporting		
1975–1978	Real Oviedo	44	(4)
1978–1980	Deportivo La Coruña	28	(2)
1980	Tampico	16	(1)
1980–1983	Neza	64	(8)
1983–1984	Monterrey	35	(2)
1986–1988	Puebla	72	(16)
1988–1989	Tigres	30	(4)

Managerial career
- 2007–2008: Sinaloa (assistant)
- 2009–2010: FICUMDEP de Xalapa A. C.
- 2011–2012: Puebla Reserves and Academy
- 2012: Puebla (Interim)
- 2013: El Tanque Sisley
- 2014: Ocelotes UNACH
- 2020: Club Veracruzano de Fútbol Tiburón
- 2022: Santa Tecla
- 2025–2026: Belize
- 2026: Tepatitlán
- * Club domestic league appearances and goals

Daniel Bartolotta (born 9 January 1955) is a former Uruguayan football player.

== Career ==
Born in Montevideo, Bartolotta began playing professional football with local side Defensor Sporting at age 17. The central midfielder spent most of his career playing abroad, moving to Spain for five seasons in 1975, before finishing his career playing in Mexico.
