= Mario Hernández (fashion house) =

Colombian clothing accessory business

Mario Hernández SA
- Company type: Fashion
- Industry: Apparels, accessories
- Founded: 1978
- Headquarters: Bogotá
- Area served: Colombia, Panama, Mexico, Russia, Aruba, Costa Rica, United States and Venezuela.
- Key people: Mario Hernández (CEO and chairman of the managing board & Chairman of the supervisory board)
- Products: High fashion clothing, accessories, footwear
- Number of employees: 500 employees.
- Website: www.mariohernandez.com

Mario Hernández is a Colombian fashion house dedicated to the manufacture of luxury leather accessories based in Bogotá D.C. It is named after its founder, Mario Hernandez (born 1941).

== History ==
Mario Hernandez is an old entrepreneur, he started his clothing company in 1978 in Bogota, in a cheap district in the city, where it is still based. However, due to the economic climate in Colombia at the time, Hernandez was forced to borrow money.

By 1979, he reached an agreement with his creditors, which left him with just 3 sewing machines to restart his business.

The same year, he became a sensation in the Sanadresito for the quality of his products. He later in the 28 of march of 1999 stated that he had formed a little globalization within Colombia. After his brands became well known in his country, he moved into neighboring Venezuela and Panama. His sales increase came in North America, opening markets starting with Mexico to United States. In the 2000s, Mario Hernandez was known almost all over America and started to open up the European market, selling in luxury leather goods sales points.

Today Mario is recognized by important companies such as Johnnie Walker, who referred to him as ¨Walking with a Colombian giant¨.

== Locations ==
As of 2008, Hernandez had 16 stores in Colombia, nine in Venezuela, four in Mexico and one in the United States.

As of 2016, the number of locations has expanded to 110 in six countries.

== Product line ==
The fashion house manufactures bags, shoes, clothes, jewelry, etc., primarily using exotic leathers.

== Manufacturing ==
Products are manufactured in Colombia as well as in Brazil by artisans. In the past the original name was Marroquineria SA.
