= Mario Hernández (footballer, born 1957) =

Mexican footballer and manager

Personal information
- Full name: Mario Hernández Calderón
- Date of birth: 20 October 1957 (age 69)
- Place of birth: Mexico City, Mexico
- Position: Forward

Senior career*
Years	Team	Apps	(Gls)
1978–1982	Zacatepec	103	(46)
1982–1985	Atlante	102	(20)
1986–1987	Ángeles de Puebla	34	(2)
1988–1989	Tampico Madero	32	(8)
1989–1992	UANL	107	(2)

Managerial career
- 2007–2016: Selva Cañera
- 2017: Cuautla
- * Club domestic league appearances and goals

Mario Hernández Calderón (born October 20, 1957) is a Mexican football manager and former player.
