= Ciudad Madero =

- City
- Ciudad Madero
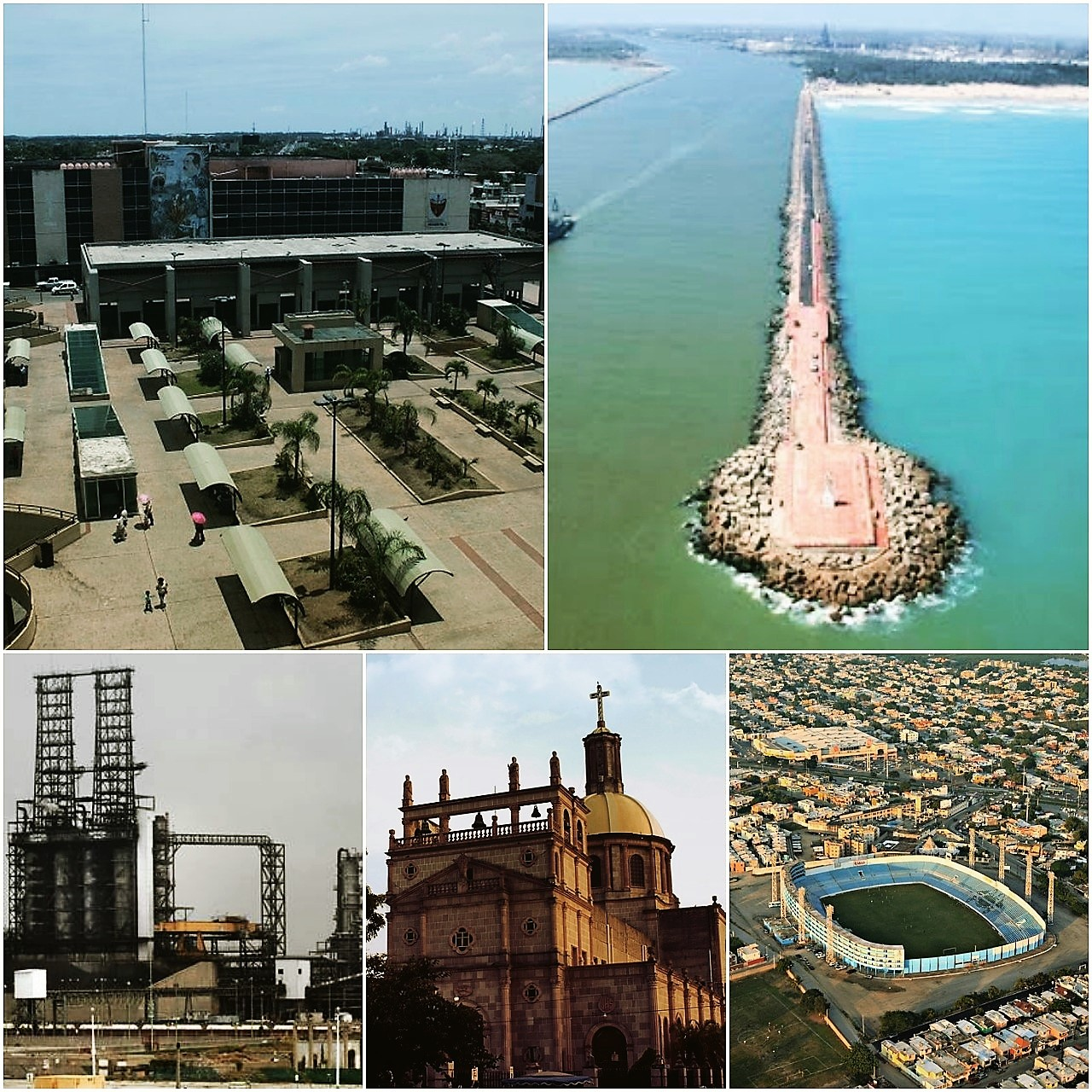
- Top to the left: Downtown, Miramar Beach Breakwater, Francisco I. Madero Refinery, Sagrado Corazón de Jesús Church, and Tamaulipas Stadium.

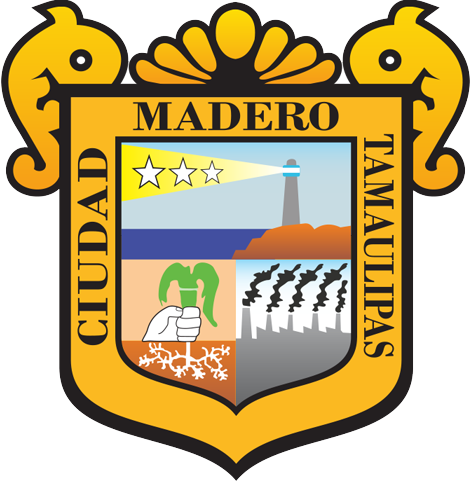
- Coat of arms

- Location within Tamaulipas Location within Mexico
- Coordinates: 22°14′51″N 97°50′15″W
- Country: Mexico
- State: Tamaulipas
- Municipality: Ciudad Madero
- Foundation: 1 May 1924
- Founder: Doña Cecilia Villarreal

Government
  - Mayor: Adrian Oseguera Kernion; MORENA

Area
  - Total: 46.6 km^{2} (18.0 sq mi)
- Elevation: 8 m (26 ft)

Population (2015)
  - Total: 209,175
- Demonym: Maderense
- Time zone: UTC−06:00 (Central)
- Postal code: 89400
- Website: www.ciudadmadero.gob.mx

Ciudad Madero is a coastal city located on the Gulf of Mexico in the southeastern part of the Mexican state of Tamaulipas. Lying within the metropolitan area of Tampico, it is the seventh most populous city in the state, with a census-estimated 2015 population of 209,175 within an area of 18.0 square miles (46.6 km^{2}) the city is the third-largest in the Tampico metropolitan area. It is also an important center for oil refining.

== History ==
The history of this city dates back to the early 19th century when the Villareal family, from Soto la Marina, settled in what is now known as Paso del Zacate. Through the crossing, people, cargo and animals were transported from one side of the river to the other, connecting the two sister states of Tamaulipas and Veracruz.

The first official records date back to the year 1824 and are precisely from Doña Cecilia Villareal, who is considered the first settler and founder of this municipality. The house where Cecilia lived, called the House of Tiles, spacious and comfortable, became an inn for tired muleteers and travelers.

These territories near the river crossings were inhabited until eventually towns were built, among others that of Doña Cecilia, which later acquired the name of Villa Cecilia.

On 1 May 1924, with Professor Candelario Garza as provisional governor, the official status of this town as a Municipality was decided. A decree was issued by which the residents of Barra, Árbol Grande and Doña Cecilia, along with the Miramar and Refinería colonies (which belonged to Tampico and Altamira) were elevated to a municipality with Villa Cecilia, Tamaulipas as its name and municipal capital.

== Buildings ==
Ciudad Madero has a beach named "Playa Miramar", which, in recent years, has been expanding its services with new hotels and restaurants. Near the beach there is a lighthouse, named "Faro de Ciudad Madero" – although this has been replaced by a red beacon light atop a small tower, to guide approaching ships in to the channel of the Río Pánuco. However, in October 2006, the Ciudad Madero Planning Commission signaled its intention to build a new lighthouse because of the cultural and tourist values it would provide.

At the Santa Cruz Church the roof collapsed during a baptism ceremony on 1 October 2023. Ten people were killed and over 60 were injured.
