= Ángeles de Puebla =

- Full name: Club Ángeles de Puebla
- Nickname(s): Angeles
- Founded: 1984
- Dissolved: 2001
- Ground: Cuauhtémoc; Puebla, Puebla, Mexico
- Capacity: 42,684
| Home colours | Away colours |

Club Ángeles de Puebla was a Mexican football team that played in the Primera División de México and the Primera División 'A' de México, it had its home in the city of Puebla, Puebla. The team was founded in the years 1984–85 after the purchase and relocation of the Club de Fútbol Oaxtepec franchise. This team did not have any success, but it was always provided with the support of the people. It was a hardened team that strained to a great extent in its stay in the Primera División. After the 1989–90 season, the franchise was sold and transferred to Torreón, Coahuila and was renamed Club Santos Laguna. The club made a brief comeback in 1999, which ended in 2001.

== History ==
The team was founded in the years 1984 – 85 after the purchase and relocation of the Club de Fútbol Oaxtepec franchise. This team did not have any success, but it was always provided with the support of the people. It was a hardened team that strained to a great extent in its stay in the Primera División de México. After the 1989–90 season, the franchise was sold and transferred to Torreón, Coahuila and was renamed Club Santos Laguna.

The first league game for Ángeles de Puebla was played on August 20, 1984 against Atlas at home. Forward Jorge Marinero scored the first goal for the new team in the tournament, and obtained their first victory that day. In their first season in the Primera Dvisión they ended up in second place. This team was nicknamed the "millionaires" by the press. Of the 24 games played in the league tournament of 1984–85, Angeles de Puebla obtained 14 victories and 2 ties, obtaining 30 points with 53 goals in favor and 30 against. In the Copa México, the team won their first cup, with 10 points from 4 victories, 2 draws and only one defeat.

After 1988-87 tournament having just avoided relegation beating Club Atlante 2–0 in the last round of the tournament, the match took place on June 21, 1988 played in the Estadio Neza 86. After the tournament ended due to lack of supporters having Puebla F.C. playing in the same city, the club was sold and moved to Torreón, Coahuila, where it went on to play under the name Club Santos Laguna.

=== Return and goodbye ===
In 1999, Puebla had the worst relegation percentage and when everyone thought the club was bound to play in the Liga de Ascenso de México, the club's owner Francisco Bernat bought the recently promoted Unión de Curtidores franchise in order to remain in the Primera División. The club that was relegated became Ángeles de Puebla and so returning after almost 15 years of absences. The club played with the Puebla FC white and blue uniform. The club took part in the Invierno 99 tournament under the management of Manuel Álvarez who led the club to the playoffs finishing with 33 points first in group 1. In the playoffs, the club was eliminated by San Luis F.C. with a score of 5–2 after 160 minutes. In the Verano 2000, the club once again had a good tournament finishing with 32 points first in group 1 and 3rd overall, Oswaldo Nartallo was the club leading scorer with 9. This time, in the playoffs, the club managed to eliminate Atletico Yucatán losing 3–1 in the first game and beating them 6–0 at home. In semifinals, the club was eliminated by Club Irapuato with an overall score of 3–2. After the tournament ended, the owners did not want to extend contracts to their best player deciding to sale and promote their best players to the first club. The club played the Invierno 2000 with a squad with an average age of 18 along with a new manager Guillermo Vázquez Mejía who had a bad tournament earning only 10 points. That would be the last tournament the club played after the owners sold and moved the club to the Universidad Cuauhtémoc and played under the name San Sebastián.

== Overall statistics ==
Year by year First division statistic 1984–88

| Year | Pos | GP | W | T | L | GS | GA | PTS |
|---|---|---|---|---|---|---|---|---|
| 1984–85 | 4 G.4 | 38 | 12 | 11 | 15 | 54 | 61 | 35 |
| PRODE-85 | 3 G.3 | 8 | 3 | 3 | 2 | 13 | 13 | 9 |
| Mexico-86 | 10 G.2 | 18 | 4 | 4 | 10 | 14 | 24 | 12 |
| 1986–87 | 5 G.5 | 40 | 9 | 16 | 16 | 40 | 49 | 34 |
| 1987–88 | 5 G.5 | 39 | 9 | 12 | 17 | 57 | 79 | 30 |

After the 1987–88 season, the club franchise was sold and moved to Torreón, Coahuila where it became Club Santos Laguna

=== Goal Scoring Records ===
| Year | Nationality | Player | Goals |
|---|---|---|---|
| 1984–85 | Mexico | Miguel Ángel Gómez | 16 |
| PRODE-85 | | | |
| Mexico-86 | | | |
| 1986–87 | Mexico | Miguel Ángel Gómez | 13 |
| 1987–88 | Chile | Carlos Poblete | 21 |

== Kits ==
The club's original colors consists of a red shirt with red shorts along with white socks. The away kit consists of a white shirt and shorts with red socks. In 1999 the club changed its colors to blue and white, the same as Puebla F.C. club that had bought the club in 1999 and had used it as a reserve squad.

Angles Puebla kit 1984–1989 Violet and white kit.

Badge used in 1999–2001

| 1984 home | 1984 away | 1985 home | 1985 Away | 1986 home | 1987 home | 1987 away | 1988 – Away | 1988 – Home |

Angles Puebla kit 1999–2001 Puebla F.C. kit.

| 1999 – home | 1999 – away |
