= List of Puebla F.C. records and statistics =

Mexican association football team Puebla F.C. has competed in the Primera División de México, Segunda División de México and Liga de Ascenso divisions. This article documents their statistics and club records.

== Year by Year standings ==
=== First division ===
Year	Pos	GP	W	T	L	GS	GA	PTS
1944–45	2	24	14	2	8	53	30	30
1945–46	3	30	17	4	9	85	48	38
1946–47	4	28	13	9	6	55	45	35
1947–48	3	28	15	5	8	40	34	35
1948–49	4	28	14	4	10	53	50	32
1949–50	7	26	11	3	12	51	54	25
1950–51	7	22	9	3	10	38	47	21
1951–52	8	22	6	7	9	30	47	19
1952–53	6	22	8	5	9	34	28	21
1953–54	3	22	8	9	5	31	29	25
1954–55	8	22	7	6	9	29	37	20
1955–56	13	26	6	4	16	35	64	16
Total		300	128	61	111	534	513	317

After the 1955–56 season, Puebla F.C. folded. It was reformed in the 1964-65 season, starting in the second division.

=== Second division ===
Year	Pos	GP	W	T	L	GS	GA	PTS
1964–65	4	30	14	9	7	49	31	37
1965–66	4	30	17	8	5	68	32	42
1966–67	4	30	17	7	6	69	37	41
1967–68	5	34	18	7	9	54	33	43
1968–69	3	34	15	12	7	44	28	42
1969–70	9	34	13	8	13	38	38	34
Total		192	94	51	47	322	199	239

In 1970 the First Division was expanded from 16 to 18 teams; the Second Division champion Zacatepec was promoted and a playoff was held for the remaining place. The teams competing for the place were Nacional, Naucalpan, Puebla and Union de Curtidores. Puebla won the playoff and was promoted.

=== First Division ===
Year	Position	Games played	Won	Tied	Lost	Goals Scored	Goals Against	Points	Postseason place
1970–71	11	34	11	10	13	43	49	32	Didn't qualify
1971–72	6	34	13	9	12	47	42	35	Didn't qualify
1972–73	8	34	12	9	13	46	46	33	Didn't qualify
1973–74	4	34	13	14	7	57	40	40	Semifinals
1974–75	9	38	14	12	12	49	48	40	Didn't qualify
1975–76	18	38	9	10	19	42	61	28	Didn't qualify
1976–77	10	38	13	11	14	49	49	37	Didn't qualify
1977–78	18	38	10	8	20	35	52	28	Didn't qualify
1978–79	7	38	14	14	19	53	49	42	Didn't qualify
1979–80	13	38	11	11	16	56	62	33	Didn't qualify
1980–81	11	38	12	13	13	57	59	37	Didn't qualify
1981–82	8	38	15	11	12	57	56	41	Didn't qualify
1982–83	3	38	15	15	8	53	39	45	CHAMPIONS
1983–84	13	38	12	10	16	53	58	34	Didn't qualify
1984–85	10	38	13	11	14	53	43	37	Quarterfinals
PRODE 85	1	8	5	3	0	??	??	13	Semifinals
Mexico 86	??	18	9	6	3	??	??	24	Quarterfinals
1986–87	6	40	15	12	13	61	48	42	Semifinals
1987–88	10	38	13	12	13	58	51	38	Quarterfinals
1988–89	1	38	20	13	5	73	31	53	Quarterfinals
1989–90	2	38	17	12	9	55	42	46	CHAMPIONS
1990–91	?	38	14	11	13	40	42	39	Semifinals
1991–92	7	38	14	13	11	44	42	41	Final
1992–93	9	38	?	?	?	58	56	43	Didn't qualify
1993–94	14	38	9	16	13	41	49	34	Didn't qualify
1994–95	7	36	12	16	8	45	41	40	Quarterfinals
1995–96	7	34	6	10	18	31	53	22	Didn't qualify
Total		864	335	279	294	1198	1142	897	??

This last total does not include the 92-93 season.

=== Short Tournaments ===
Year	Position	Games played	Won	Tied	Lost	Goals Scored	Goals Against	Points	Postseason place
Invierno 96	4	17	9	4	4	37	29	31	Semifinals
Verano 97	14	17	4	8	5	15	18	20	Didn't qualify
Invierno 97	17	17	5	4	8	20	27	19	Didn't qualify
Verano 98	10	17	4	6	8	25	33	18	Repechaje
Invierno 98	18	17	2	3	12	13	39	9	Didn't qualify
Verano 99	16	17	3	4	10	15	30	15	Didn't qualify
Invierno 99	16	17	3	4	10	15	30	15	Didn't qualify
Verano 2000	8	17	6	6	5	30	28	24	Didn't qualify
Invierno 2000	16	17	4	4	9	18	20	16	Didn't qualify
Verano 2001	5	17	7	6	4	21	17	27	Semifinals
Invierno 2001	10	17	5	8	5	22	22	23	Didn't qualify
Verano 2002	18	17	5	11	24	45	22	11	Didn't qualify
Apertura 2002	16	17	6	4	9	23	29	22	Didn't qualify
Clausura 2003	19	17	4	4	11	15	31	16	Didn't qualify
Apertura 2003	17	17	5	5	9	23	30	20	Didn't qualify
Clausura 2004	16	17	5	5	9	27	29	20	Didn't qualify
Apertura 2004	12	17	5	6	6	17	23	21	Didn't qualify
Clausura 2005	15	17	4	4	9	19	29	16	Didn't qualify

=== Primera A ===
Year	Position	Games played	Won	Tied	Lost	Goals Scored	Goals Against	Points	Postseason place
Apertura 2005	1	19	10	3	6	29	22	33	Champion
Clausura 2006	17	19	3	5	11	16	32	14	Didn't qualify
Apertura 2006	1	17	9	6	2	30	17	33	Champion
Clausura 2007	2	17	11	3	3	42	16	63	Semifinals

=== First Division ===
Year	Position	Games played	Won	Tied	Lost	Goals Scored	Goals Against	Points	Postseason place
Apertura 2007	14	17	4	5	8	16	24	17	Didn't qualify
Clausura 2008	11	17	5	6	6	28	25	21	Didn't qualify
Apertura 2008	18	17	2	9	6	12	21	15	Didn't qualify
Clausura 2009	5	17	7	5	5	21	24	26	Semifinals
Apertura 2009	7	17	6	9	4	24	26	26	Quarterfinals

=== Clubs Records ===
- First goal in the first division (Cup)Guadalupe Velásquez 1944
- First goal in the first division (League) Eladio Aschetto 1944
- Largest win 8-1 against Tampico Madero 1986-87
- Most goals scored Ricardo Alvarez 87 goles
- Most goals score in long tournament Jorge Orlando Aravena 1988-89 (28)
- Most goals scored in short tournament Carlos Muñoz 1996 (15)
- Fastes goal score in a game Nicolás Olivera 2009 (11 sec against Cruz Azul)
- Most titles as manager Manuel Lapuente (5)League 82-83,89-90, Cup Mexico 89-90, cup champions in champions 89-90, League champions concacaf 1991
- Most games won 1945–47 and 1988–89 won 20
- Most game won in short tournament 1996 9
- Most points obtain in a long tournament 1988-89 (69)
- Most points obtain in a short tournament 1996 (31)
- Most games played with the club Arturo Alvarez (346) league games only

== All time top goalscorers ==
Since the 1950s, when Ricardo Alvarez scored his 86th and last goal with the club, no one else has accomplished this feat. It was on May 21, 1959 when Alvarez scored his last goals with Puebla before leaving the club to join Veracruz. Alvarez left a record of 86 goals in 125 games through a career that spanned 5 years. Half a century later, the name of "La Changa" Alvarez is still the best goal scorer ever in the history of Puebla F.C. in first division. Even with the club's constancy in first division, playing a total of 54 championships, no other player has reached Alvarez's number of goals scored and only one player has obtained the league goal scoring title in 1996.

It was the Spanish Carlos Muñoz who gave Puebla F.C. their only one goal scoring title in 1996 with 15 goals. Thanks to 4 good tournaments, Muñoz placed himself in the list of the best goal scorers in the club's history but still far from the 86 scored by Ricardo Alvarez. Two players were close to beat Alvarez's record: Silvio Fogel in The 1970s and Carlos Poblete in the 1980s. Silvio Fogel scored 84 goals and now is the scoring runner-up in Puebla's history. Carlos Poblete scored 83 and now is third place in the all-time scoring list. Carlos Poblete is at the top of the list in goals scored in playoffs with 15 goals scored. Carlos and Silvio scored over 100 goals each one, but this was done playing with different clubs. And Ricardo Alvarez did the same scoring 113 goals in his career playing for Puebla F.C., Moctezuma, and Veracruz.

Position	Player	Goals	Years
*1	Ricardo Álvarez	87	1945–1950
*2	Silvio Fogel	84	1975–1980
*3	Carlos Poblete	83	1986–1996
*4	Álvaro González	75	2006–2010
*5	Jorge Aravena	66	1988–1991
*6	Guadalupe Velásquez	61	1943–1949
*7	Muricy Ramalho	57	1979–1985
*8	Paul Rene Moreno	45	1982–1989
*9	Matias Alustiza	36	2012–present
*10	Carlos Muñoz	33	1996-98

=== Goal scoring titles ===
Year	Player	Goals	Division
Invierno 1996	Carlos Muñoz	15	Primera División de México
Apertura 2006	Álvaro González	19	Primera A
Clausura 2007	Álvaro González	22	Primera A
Clausura 2010	(United States) Herculez Gomez	10	Primera División de México

== Notable managers ==
Year	Manager	Notes
1944–48	(Spain) Eduardo Morilla	won 1945 Copa Mexico
1952–54	(Spain) Isidro Lángara	won 1952-53 Copa Mexico
1964	(Mexico) Donato Alonso	First coached after club folded in 1957
1982–1984	(Mexico) Manuel Lapuente	Won 1982-83 league title
1985–1987	(Uruguay) Hugo Fernández	
1989–1990	(Mexico) Manuel Lapuente	Won 1989-1990 league title
1990	(Brazil) Jorge Viera	Won CONCACAF Champions League 1991
1994	(Mexico) Alfredo Tena	
1999	(Mexico) Mario Carrillo	First of 3 stays with club
2005	(Mexico) René Paul Moreno	Won 2005 primera A title
2006–present	(Mexico) José Luis Sánchez Solá	Won 2006 primera A title and 2007 promotion matched
