= 1944–45 Puebla F.C. season =

Puebla
1944-45 season
- Chairman: Joaquín Diaz Loredo
- Manager: Eduardo Morilla
- Stadium: El Mirador
- 1944–45 Mexican Primera División season: 2nd
Home colours	Away colours

The 1944–45 Puebla season was the first professional season of Mexico's top-flight football league. This was the first season the club played in the Mexican professional league. The club had joined a year after the league began competition in 1943. Puebla finished second in the league to Club Espana and managed to establishment itself as one of the countries powerful clubs.

== League ==
1944–45 season was the first the club played in the First Division after being invited by the league in 1943.

=== Matchday ===
August 27, 1944 1	Puebla	5–2	Club Atlas	Puebla City, Puebla
				Stadium: Parque El Mirador

September 3, 1944 3	Puebla	2–1	Club America	Puebla City, Puebla
19:00				Stadium: Parque El Mirador

September 24, 1944 6	Real Club España	2–1	Puebla	Mexico City, Mexico
				Stadium: Parque España

October 1, 1944 8	Puebla	2–0	Club Leon	Puebla City, Puebla
				Stadium: Parque El Mirador

October 15, 1944 9	Tiburones Rojos	0–0	Puebla	Veracruz City, Veracruz
				Stadium: Deportivo Veracruzano

October 22, 1944 10	Albinegros de Orizaba	3–2	Puebla	Orizaba, Veracruz
				Stadium: Parque Orizaba

October 29, 1944 11	Puebla	1–2	Atlante F.C.	Puebla City, Puebla
				Stadium: Parque El Mirador

November 9, 1944 13	Puebla	4–0	C.D. Marte	Puebla City, Puebla
				Stadium: Parque El Mirador

November 23, 1944 15	C.D. Guadalajara	1–2	Puebla	Guadalajara, Jalisco
				Stadium: Parque El Mirador

November 30, 1944 16	Puebla	0–2	U.D. Moctezuma de Orizaba	Puebla City, Puebla
				Stadium: Parque El Mirador

December 14, 1944 18	Puebla	3–0	C.D. Oro	Puebla City, Puebla
				Stadium: Parque El Mirador

December 28, 1944 20	Asturias F.C.	1–2	Puebla	Mexico City, Mexico
				Stadium: Parque Asturias

January 4, 1945 21	Puebla	0–1	Real Club España	Puebla City, Puebla
				Stadium: Parque El Mirador

January 11, 1945 22	Club Leon	1–5	Puebla	Leon, Guanajuato

January 11, 1945 24	Puebla	5–1	Asturias F.C.	Puebla City, Puebla
				Stadium: Parque El Mirador

February 1, 1945 25	Club Atlas	1–2	Puebla	Guadalajara, Jalisco

February 8, 1945 26	Albinegros de Orizaba	2–1	Puebla	Orizaba, Veracruz
				Stadium: Parque El Mirador

February 18, 1945 27	Puebla	1–2	C.D. Oro	Puebla City, Puebla
				Stadium: Parque El Mirador

March 1, 1945 29	U.D. Moctezuma de Orizaba	4–1	Puebla	Orizaba, Veracruz
				Stadium: Estadio Socum

March 12, 1945 31	Puebla	1–0	Tiburones Rojos	Puebla City, Puebla
				Stadium: Parque El Mirador

March 22, 1945 32	C.D. Marte	4–3	Puebla	Cuernavaca, Morelos
				Stadium: Parque El Mirador

March 29, 1945 33	Atlante F.C.	1–1	Puebla	Mexico City, Mexico
				Stadium: Parque Asturias

April 12, 1945 35	Club America	0–2	Puebla	Mexico City, Mexico
				Stadium: Parque Asturias

April 19, 1945 36	Puebla	3–0	C.D. Guadalajara	Puebla City, Puebla
				Stadium: Parque El Mirador

- Puebla had by weeks in rounds :2,4,5,7,12,14,17,19,23,28,30,34

== Copa Mexico ==
=== Matches ===
April 26, 1945 1	U.D. Moctezuma de Orizaba	2–0	Puebla	Cuernavaca, Morelos

May 3, 1945 2	Puebla	2-2	Tiburones Rojos de Veracruz	Puebla, Puebla
21:00				Stadium: Parque Mirador

May 24, 1945 5	Puebla	6–0	Albinegros de Orizaba	Puebla, Puebla
				Stadium: Parque Mirador

Puebla Had by weeks in rounds 3 and 4th .

=== Final phase ===
First leg:

June 3, 1945
Atlas	4-4	Puebla
Asturias	4-3	Oro
Moctezuma	1-3	América

Second leg:

June 10, 1945
Puebla	4-0	Atlas	agg: 8-4
Oro	5-3	Asturias	agg: 8-7
América	2-3	Moctezuma	agg: 5-4

=== Semi-final ===
June 17, 1945
Puebla	3-1	Oro

América bye to Final

=== Final ===
June 24, 1945
América	4-6	Puebla

Copa México 1944-45 Winners
Puebla
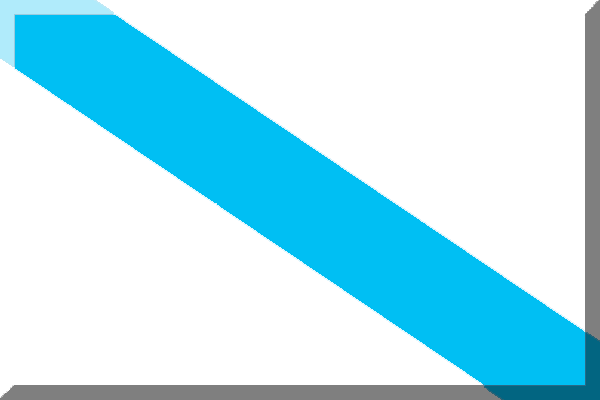
1st Title

=== Goalscorers ===
No.	Pos.	Nation	Name	Liga	Cup	Total
	FW	(Mexico)	Ricardo Alarcón	12	4	16
	FW	(Mexico)	Guadalupe Velásquez	12	2	14
	FW	(Costa Rica)	Walter Meneses	8		8
	MF	(Mexico)	Manuel Alonso	4		4
	MF	(Mexico)	Arturo Chavez	4	15	19
	FW	(Argentina)	Eladio Vaschetto	4	3	7
	FW	(Argentina)	Bruno Rodolfi	2		2
	FW	(Mexico)	Juan José González	2		2
	DF	(Mexico)	Rafael Escalada	1		1
	DF	(Mexico)	Alfonso Escobedo	1		1
	DF	(Mexico)	Miguel López	1		1
	DF	(Mexico)	Filiberto Guerrero	1	2	3

== See also ==
- 1944–45 Mexican Primera División season
- 1944–45 Copa México
- Liga MX
