= Club Futbol Asturias de Puebla =

Mexican football club

Asturias de Puebla
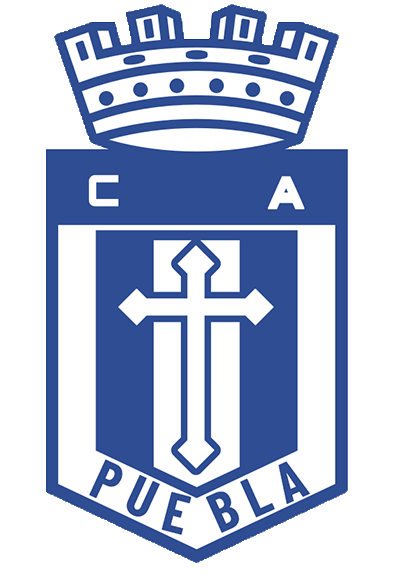
- Full name: Club Futbol Asturias de Puebla
- Nickname: Asturiano
- Founded: 1918
- Dissolved: 1943; 83 years ago
- Ground: Parque Asturias Puebla , Puebla
Home colours	Away colours

Club Futbol Asturias de Puebla was a Mexican club that was one of the pioneers of association football in the state and city of Puebla. The club was founded in 1918 as Asturias de Puebla, by mostly Mexican natives and the Spaniard Asturias community. The club was one of the most successful of the amateur era in Puebla. The club would dissolve in the early 1940s when it merged with España de Puebla, a few years before professional football was established in Mexico.

== History ==
Club Asturias de Puebla was founded on 1918 by Manuel Hill Owner of La Constancia Mexicana a textile factory in the city of Puebla. The club was in some way inspired by Club Asturias from Mexico City who they would go on to use that clubs jersey colors and vertical blue stripes. The first few years the club was made up by the textile factory workers who would quickly picked up the game.

During the 1920s the club would have a fierce rivalry against Club Espana who would go on to win multiple state championships during this decade. During the 1930s the tables would turn having Asturias dominated this decade winning multiple state and national championships.In 1936 Asturias would be invited to play an exhibition game to inaugurate the Parque Asturias against a representative squad of Mexico city.

=== 1939 State and nation Championships ===
During the 1939 tournament Asturias would go on to win the state championship over Club Espana and would go on to face U.D. Moctezuma de Orizaba in Orizaba Veracruz who they would go on to beat .some notable players from this team were Mario Zendejas , Aurelio “El Güero” Alonso, Salvador Lepe, “El Patón”, Julián Ruiz, Manolo Pría, Esteban García, Corona, Lacuz, “Negro” Bernal y “Baterías” Solano.

=== Dissolution and fusion ===
By the early 1940s the club after winning the league in 1939 for the second consecutive year , This all came to an abrupt end in 1942/1943 when the club was forced to join forces with Club Espana, in most part due to economic problems. Club Asturias had a better economic force backing the club with its owner Manuel Hill. The fusion did not last long, being that in Mexico City and around the country club owners and donors were already in plans to form a professional football league in Mexico, which came to be in 1943. During this time former presidents, donors, ex-players of both Club Espana and Club Asturias joined forces and brought to life the new club Puebla F.C., which they both rallied around.

== Honors ==
Torneo Estado de Puebla

- 1930, 1937, 1938, 1939,

Campeonato Nacional

- 1937 ,1939,

== See also ==
- Real Club España
