= Marcelino Bernal =

Mexican footballer (born 1962)

Personal information
- Full name: Marcelino Bernal Pérez
- Date of birth: 27 May 1962 (age 64)
- Place of birth: Tepic, Nayarit, Mexico
- Height: 1.80 m (5 ft 11 in)
- Position: Midfielder

Youth career
- 1979–1983: Cruz Azul

Senior career*
Years	Team	Apps	(Gls)
1983–1987	Cruz Azul	79	(6)
1987–1991	Puebla	148	(24)
1991–1997	Toluca	150	(33)
1997–1998	Monterrey	42	(12)
1999–2000	Pachuca	52	(7)
2001	UNAM	25	(1)
Total		496	(84)

International career
1988–1998	Mexico	65	(5)

Managerial career
- 2006: Santos Laguna (assistant)
- 2010: Guerreros de Hermosillo
- 2011: Tampico Madero
- 2011–2013: Coras reserves
- 2014: Coras reserves
- 2015–2016: Indios UACJ
- * Club domestic league appearances and goals

Marcelino Bernal Pérez (born 27 May 1962) is a Mexican former professional footballer who played as a midfielder.

== Club career ==
A talented all-around midfielder who was able to win possession effectively as well as score goals, Bernal spent most of his club career with Puebla and Toluca. He won two championships: Puebla in 1990 and Pachuca in 1999. He ended his top-flight career with UNAM in 2001.

== International career ==
Bernal got 65 caps and 5 goals for the Mexico national team between 1988 and 1998, and he participated at the World Cups in 1994 and 1998. Bernal's career developed at a relatively late stage, and he earned 58 of his 65 caps at the age of 30 or older. At the 1994 World Cup he scored a goal in the game against Italy, but he was best known for the Mexico-Bulgaria second-round game in which he cleared a shot from Krasimir Balakov, but in doing so, he fell on the net and snapped the post, causing the goal to cave in. An eight-minute delay was needed to install a new net and play resumed. Mexico would eventually lose in a penalty shootout, in which Bulgaria goalkeeper Borislav Mihaylov saved Bernal's attempt.

== Managerial career ==
Bernal managed the Guerreros de Hermosillo in 2010.

== Honours ==
Puebla

- Mexican Primera División: 1989–90
- Copa México: 1987–88, 1989–90
- Campeón de Campeones: 1990

Pachuca

- Mexican Primera División: 1999

== Career statistics ==
=== International goals ===
#	Date	Venue	Opponent	Score	Result	Competition
1	8 March 1992	Estadio Azulgrana, Mexico City, Mexico	CIS	4–0	4–0	Friendly
2	6 December 1992	Estadio Azulgrana, Mexico City, Mexico	Saint Vincent and the Grenadines	4–0	11–0	1994 FIFA World Cup qualification
3	6 December 1992	Estadio Azulgrana, Mexico City, Mexico	Saint Vincent and the Grenadines	7–0	11–0	1994 FIFA World Cup qualification
4	6 December 1992	Estadio Azulgrana, Mexico City, Mexico	Saint Vincent and the Grenadines	8–0	11–0	1994 FIFA World Cup qualification
5	28 June 1994	RFK Stadium, Washington, D.C., United States	Italy	1–1	1–1	1994 FIFA World Cup
