= Álvaro González (footballer, born 1973) =

Uruguayan footballer

Personal information
- Full name: Álvaro Fabián González Pintos
- Date of birth: 12 September 1973 (age 53)
- Place of birth: Canelones, Uruguay
- Height: 1.80 m (5 ft 11 in)
- Position: Forward

Senior career*
Years	Team	Apps	(Gls)
1992–1997	Cerro		
1998	Everton		(10)
1999	Frontera Rivera		
2000–2002	Bella Vista	5	(0)
2002–2004	UNAM	16	(4)
2003–2004	→ Sinaloa (loan)	34	(10)
2004–2006	Tabasco	85	(46)
2006–2009	Puebla	98	(65)
2009	Lobos BUAP	18	(9)
2009–2010	Puebla	15	(7)
2011	Danubio	8	(1)
- * Club domestic league appearances and goals

Álvaro Fabián González Pintos (born 12 September 1973 in Canelones) is a former Uruguayan footballer who played as a forward.

== Club career ==
González began his career playing for Uruguayan side Cerro who back then played at the Primera División Uruguaya. He then moved to Bella Vista of the same league. In 2002, after a spell at Bella Vista and Chilean side Everton, he joined Pumas at age 28. He played two seasons for Pumas and participated in the Copa Libertadores but did not become a regular member of the squad. Instead, he dropped down to play in the Primera A with Dorados de Sinaloa where he played 34 games scoring 10 goals. He was then transferred to another Primera A team, Lagartos de Tabasco where he played in 85 games scoring 46 goals. In 2006 moved to Puebla FC, who did not manage promotion after being relegated in 2005 to the Primera A. At Puebla, 'Bolita' quickly became a fan favorite as he helped the club win the 2006-07 championship. By doing so, he was top scorer of the Primera A two times where he scored 19 goals in the Apertura and then 22 goals in the Clausura. González was fundamental in Puebla's promotion to the Primera División in 2007. In 2009, he was released by Puebla FC and signed with Primera A's club and city rival Lobos de la BUAP where he scored 9 goals in 19 matches, and returning to Puebla FC shortly afterwards. Despite scoring most goals at the Primera A, he currently persists as the fourth all time topscorer for Puebla FC with 72 goals, 11 goals behind one of Puebla's emblems of the 90s, the Chilean Carlos Poblete. On 29 December 2010, with 37 years old, Alvaro González signed a one-year contract with the Uruguayan club Danubio FC.

== Clubes ==
Club	Country	Year	Games Played	Goals
Cerro	Uruguay	1992–1997		
Everton	Chile	1998		
Frontera Rivera	Uruguay	1999		
Bella Vista	Uruguay	2000–2002		
U.N.A.M.	Mexico	2002–2003	9	4
Dorados de Sinaloa	Mexico	2004	34	10
Lagartos	Mexico	2004–2006	85	46
Puebla FC	Mexico	2006–2009	109	65
Lobos BUAP	Mexico	2009	19	9
Puebla FC	Mexico	2009–2010	15	7
Danubio FC	Uruguay	2010 – present		

== Honors ==
- Puebla FC
- Campeonato de Ascenso 2007
- Primera División A Apertura 2006

=== Individual ===
Goal scoring Title

- Puebla FC Apertura 2006(19) Clausura 2007(22)
