= Mario Carrillo =

Mexican footballer and manager (born 1956)

Personal information
- Full name: José Mario Carrillo Zamudio
- Date of birth: 1 February 1956 (age 70)
- Place of birth: Mexico City, Mexico
- Position: Defender

Managerial career
- Years: Team
- 1996–1997: Necaxa (assistant)
- 1997–1999: Cruz Azul (assistant)
- 1999–2001: Puebla
- 2002: América
- 2003: Cruz Azul
- 2003: Puebla
- 2004–2005: América
- 2006–2007: Tigres UANL
- 2008: Puebla
- 2009–2010: Mexico (assistant)
- 2012: UNAM
Medal record
Pan American Games
| Gold medal – first place | 1975 Mexico City | Team competition |

José Mario Carrillo Zamudio (born 1 February 1956) is a Mexican former professional footballer and manager, and a commentator for television sports channel ESPN Deportes.

== Career ==
Born on February 1, 1956, in Mexico City, Carrillo went on to have a distinguished career in Mexican football. He began his professional journey with Atlético Español and later played for several clubs, including Tigres UANL, Neza, Oaxtepec, Puebla, and Ángeles de Puebla. At Tigres, he achieved significant success, helping the team win the Primera División championship in the 1977–78 season.

On the international stage, Carrillo represented the Mexico national team at the 1976 Summer Olympics in Montreal and won a gold medal at the 1975 Pan American Games.

Carrillo transitioned into coaching after his playing days, starting as an assistant coach under Manuel Lapuente at Necaxa and later working in the same capacity for Luis Fernando Tena at Cruz Azul. His first head coaching role came with Puebla in 1999. He later joined Club América in the Apertura 2002, where he set a record for consecutive victories, though he was unable to secure a championship that season. He continued to move between clubs, taking charge of Cruz Azul, before returning to Puebla.

In 2004, Carrillo returned to Club América and led the team to their tenth league title in the Clausura 2005. Afterward, he became the manager of Tigres UANL, and in 2008, he returned to Puebla for a third time.

In 2009, Carrillo was invited by Javier Aguirre to join the technical staff of the Mexico national team as an assistant coach. He held this position until the conclusion of the 2010 FIFA World Cup. His final coaching role to date came with Universidad Nacional in the Apertura 2012.

After retiring from coaching, Carrillo transitioned to broadcasting, providing expert commentary and analysis as a football analyst for a cable television network.

== Honours ==
=== Player ===
Tigres UANL

- Mexican Primera División: 1977–78

=== Manager ===
Club América

- Mexican Primera División: Clausura 2005
- Campeón de Campeones: 2005
