= Mateo Fígoli =

Uruguayan footballer (born 1984)

Mateo Figoli
Personal information
- Full name: Mateo Figoli Martínez
- Date of birth: 3 August 1984 (age 42)
- Place of birth: Maldonado, Uruguay
- Height: 1.71 m (5 ft 7 in)
- Position: Midfielder

Team information
- Current team: Atenas

Senior career*
Years	Team	Apps	(Gls)
2001–2003	Deportivo Maldonado	22	(4)
2003–2004	Atenas	32	(10)
2005	SC Kriens	16	(2)
2005–2006	Rampla Juniors	29	(6)
2006–2007	Querétaro	31	(6)
2007	Puebla	17	(1)
2008	Danubio	11	(0)
2008–2009	Triestina	14	(1)
2009–2012	León	42	(3)
2011–2012	→ Dorados (loan)	29	(6)
2012–2013	Cúcuta Deportivo	34	(3)
2013–2014	Estudiantes Tecos	0	(0)
2014	Dorados	7	(0)
2015	Mineros de Zacatecas	22	(0)
2015–2016	Alianza Petrolera	39	(4)
2016–2017	Atlético Huila	39	(2)
2018–	Atenas	4	(0)
- * Club domestic league appearances and goals as of 3 February 2019

Mateo Figoli Martínez (born 3 August 1984 in Maldonado) is an Italian-Uruguayan footballer playing for Atenas.

== Career ==
Figoli played for Mexican Primera División side Querétaro FC in 2006. In June 2008, he was signed by Triestina, from Hungarian company Rexan for €1,200,000 as third parties ownership (or later accused a false accounting). Triestina also received €400,000 from A.C. ChievoVerona by not excised the option to buy him in 2008–09 season. In December 2009, he was sold for a reported €50,000.
