= Carlos Poblete =

Chilean footballer (born 1963)

Personal information
- Full name: Carlos Alberto Poblete Jofré
- Date of birth: 13 October 1963 (age 63)
- Place of birth: Santiago, Chile
- Height: 1.78 m (5 ft 10 in)
- Position: Striker

Youth career
- Universidad de Chile

Senior career*
Years	Team	Apps	(Gls)
1981–1986	Universidad de Chile	58	(8)
1986–1987	Puebla	35	(8)
1987–1988	Ángeles de Puebla	33	(20)
1988–1992	Puebla	167	(68)
1992–1993	Cruz Azul	35	(14)
1993–1995	Veracruz	64	(15)
1995–1996	Puebla	32	(7)
1996	O'Higgins	17	(4)
1997–1998	Unión de Curtidores		(12)
Total			(156)

International career
1983	Chile (amateur)	1	(0)
1985	Chile XI	5	(3)
1985	Chile A-2	2	(1)

Managerial career
- 2000: Ángeles de Puebla
- 2010: Lobos BUAP
- 2012: Lobos BUAP
- 2012: Puebla
- * Club domestic league appearances and goals

Carlos Alberto Poblete Jofré (born 13 October 1963) is a Chilean former professional footballer who played as a striker. Also, former head coach of Puebla in the Liga MX.

== Club career ==
Poblete began his career with the Chilean club Universidad de Chile in 1980, where he played until 1986 when he transferred to the Mexican club Puebla FC. During his first year he scored eight goals in 35 games, which did not convince the coach or the owners, so he was sent out on loan to crosstown rival Ángeles de Puebla. While playing there he scored 20 goals, which got the attention of Puebla FC's coach, so he was transferred back. In the 1988–89 tournament he scored 23 goals. In 1989–90 he increased his goal scoring further, scoring 22, including two in the 1989 final against Leones Negros.

After the 1992 tournament, with the club in hiatus after losing the 1992 final, he was transferred to Cruz Azul where he managed to score 14 goals. In the 1993 tournament he was sent to Veracruz, where he spent two years scoring 15 goals in 64 games. In 1995, he returned to Puebla where he scored his last seven with the club. He finished with 83, placing himself third all time in the club's records. At the end of the tournament he left for his native Chile where he played with Club Deportivo O'Higgins for the 1996 tournament. In 1997, he again returned to Mexico to play with Unión de Curtidores where he retired.

== International career ==
Poblete represented Chile at the 1983 Pan American Games in Caracas, Venezuela, making an appearance versus Cuba U23. In addition, he made appearances for the Chile B-team in the friendly tournament 1985 Indonesian Independence Cup, where Chile became champion, and the Los Angeles Nations Cup.

== Coaching career ==
Poblete has mainly developed a career with Puebla. He has served as coach for the youth system, interim coach of the first team and sport director.

== Personal life ==
He was nicknamed Búfalo (Buffalo) due to his corpulence.

After his retirement, he has performed as a football commentator.

His son of the same name, Carlos Poblete Aguerrebere, is a Mexican former footballer who played for clubs suchs as Lobos BUAP, Puebla, among others.

In 2026, Government of Puebla erected some commemorative statues in honor of idols for Club Puebla including Poblete, Roberto Ruiz Esparza, José Luis "Chelís" Sánchez, Manuel Lapuente, among others.

== Honours ==
Puebla

- Primera División de México: 1989–90
- Copa México: 1989–90
- Campeón de Campeones: 1989–90
- Copa de Campeones de la Concacaf: 1991

Chile B

- Indonesian Independence Cup (1): 1985
