= España de Puebla =

Club de Fútbol España
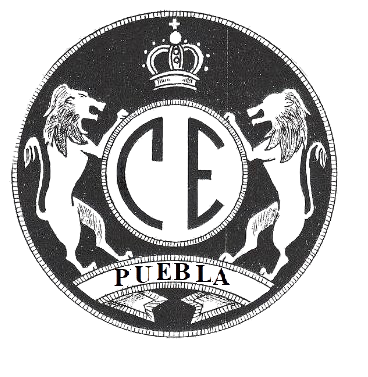
- Full name: Club de Fútbol España de Puebla
- Nickname: Los Blancos (The Whites)
- Founded: 1915; 111 years ago
- Dissolved: 1943; 83 years ago
- Ground: Estadio Velódromo; Puebla, Puebla
- League: Dissolved
Home colours	Away colours

Club de Fútbol España de Puebla was a Mexican club that was one of the pioneers of football in the state and city of Puebla. The club was founded in 1915 as Puebla FC, by mostly Mexican natives and the Spanish community. The club was one of the most successful of the amateur era in Puebla. The club would dissolve in the early 1940s when it was merged with Asturias de Puebla, a few years before professional football was established in Mexico. History would have it that the club would return and form part of Puebla F.C., the same name the club was founded with in 1915.

== History ==
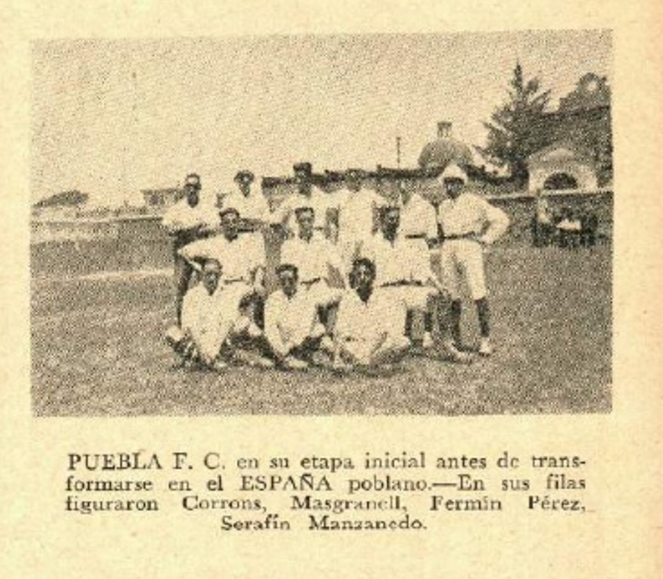
Puebla FC in 1915.

The club was founded in 1915 under the name Puebla FC just 8 years after Puebla A.C., the first football club in the state, was dissolved in 1907. To the contrary of Puebla A.C., Puebla FC was founded by the Mexican and Spanish communities of the city of Puebla. In 1916, the club changed its name to España de Puebla after the club associated itself with Real Club España from Mexico City. During its first years of existence, the club struggled to find opponents in the state of Puebla, finding few in San Martín, which forced the club to travel east to the state of Veracruz where football was more developed. In Orizaba, Veracruz, a town in Mexico where football clubs rivaled in experience and numbers to the ones in the capital, the club had its first real matches against experienced clubs such as Unión Deportiva Río Blanco and Club Cervantes.

=== First rivalry ===
The club's first rivalry was born in 1918 when Club Reforma de Puebla was founded by French-Mexican Enrique Lederman. This became strong during its first years, being that both clubs shared the Estadio Velódromo. The rivalry came to an en in 1921 when Club Reforma folded due to economic problems. From this two more clubs were born – Club Universal and Club México, who were no real rivals to España.

=== Golden years ===
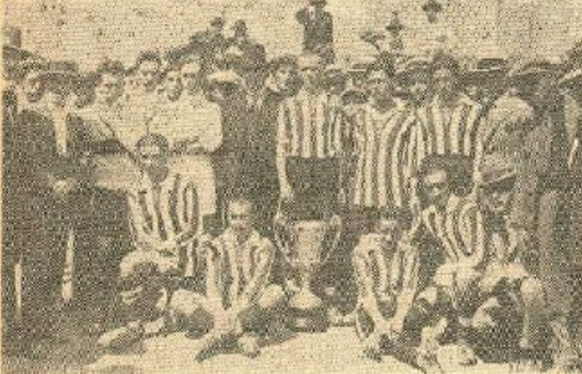
1926 Copa Gallegos Champion.

After its main rival Club Reforma was dissolved in 1921, the club felt the effect and had three years of mediocre play. It was in 1925 when Laureano R. Álvarez took over the presidency of the club which lifted the club back up. During these years, the club started traveling to states like Veracruz, Mexico City, and Hidalgo to play against top-tier opposition such as América, Aurrerá, Germania, Pachuca, and Albinegros de Orizaba – clubs who played in the semi professional Primera Fuerza league. In 1926, the club managed to win the Copa Excelsior which they won for a second time in 1928. In 1927, the club won the Copa Gallegos against Pachuca (the cup was donated by a wealthy man of the city of Pachuca). The club's success was noticed in Mexico City in particular; Real Club España would buy some of the club's players. One of the most successful players and a fan favorite was Joaquín Colubi Rodríguez. In 1930, Antonio Guerra took over in a time where the club was just about to start the biggest rivalry in its history.

=== Dissolution and fusion ===
By the early 1940s the club was still in a heated competition against arch rival Club Asturias, with Asturias winning the league in 1939 for the second consecutive year. This all came to an abrupt end in 1942/1943 when the club was forced to join forces with Club Asturias, in most part due to economic problems. Club Asturias had a better economic force backing the club with its owner Manuel Hill. The fusion did not last long, being that in Mexico City and around the country club owners and donors were already in plans to form a professional football league in Mexico, which came to be in 1943. During this time former presidents, donors, ex-players of both Club España and Club Asturias joined forces and brought to life the new club Puebla F.C., which they both rallied around.

== Honours ==
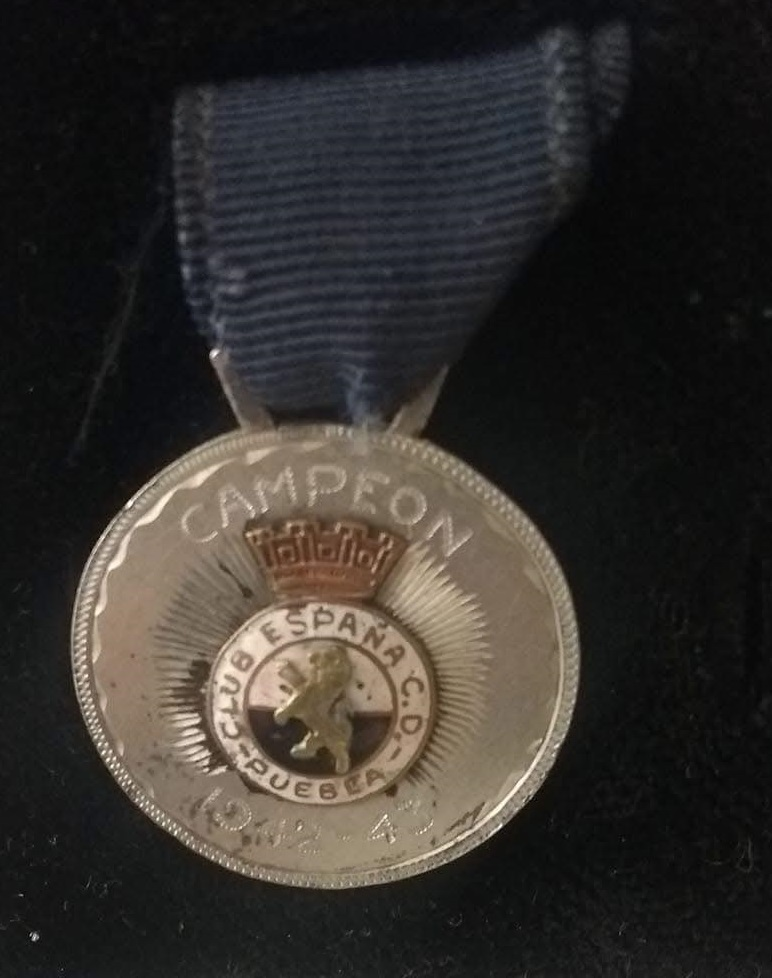
1942-43 League medal

- Liga Amateur de Puebla – 1928, 1929, 1930, 1942, 1943
- Copas Amistosas
- Copa Excelsior – 1926, 1928
- Trofeo Gallegos – 1927

== Notable players ==
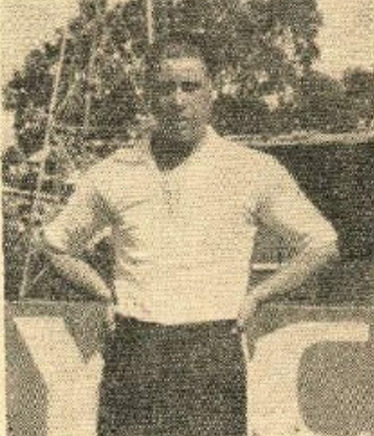
Serafin Manzanedo, first captain of the club in 1915

- (Mexico) Serafín Manzanedo
- (Mexico) Fermín Pérez
- (Mexico) Ángel Díaz
- (Mexico) Corron Masgranell
- (Mexico) Obdulio Fernández
- (Mexico) Joaquín Pérez
- (Mexico) Roberto Lancanda
- (Mexico) Máximo García
- (Mexico) Jesús Ruiz
- (Mexico) Rogelio Rodríguez
- (Mexico) Alberto Sánchez
- (Mexico) Alfonso Sobero
- (Mexico) José Hill
- (Mexico) Ramón Dietsel
- (Mexico) Sergio López
- (Mexico) Ramón Bonet
- (Mexico) Cesareo González

== See also ==
- Real Club España
