= Sergio Almirón (footballer, born 1958) =

Argentine footballer (born 1958)

Personal information
- Full name: Sergio Omar Almirón
- Date of birth: 18 November 1958 (age 67)
- Place of birth: Rosario, Argentina
- Height: 1.76 m (5 ft 9 1/2 in)
- Position: Centre forward

Senior career*
Years	Team	Apps	(Gls)
1977–1986	Newell's Old Boys	(total) 283	(63)
1986–1987	Tours FC	29	(8)
1987–1989	Newell's Old Boys	(see above)	
1991	Tigres	73	(23)
1991–1992	Estudiantes	12	(0)
1992–1994	Central Córdoba	62	(15)
1994	Talleres	3	(0)
Total		462	(109)

International career
1985–1986	Argentina	6	(4)
Medal record
Men's football
Representing Argentina
FIFA World Cup
Winner	1986 Mexico
- * Club domestic league appearances and goals

Sergio Omar Almirón (born 18 November 1958) is an Argentine retired footballer who played as a centre-forward for the Argentine national football team.

During his career (1978–1993), he played for Newell's Old Boys, Tours FC (France), UANL Tigres (Mexico), Estudiantes, Central Córdoba, and Talleres de Córdoba.

Almirón was in the Argentina squad that won the 1986 FIFA World Cup, though he did not play any games during that tournament. Despite playing as a striker, Almirón was allocated the number 1 shirt for the 1986 tournament, traditionally reserved for goalkeepers. This was due to Argentina's policy of the time of numbering their squad alphabetically. He is the father of former footballer Sergio Bernardo Almirón.

== Honours ==
=== Club ===
Newell's Old Boys

- Primera División: 1987–88
- Copa Libertadores runner-up: 1988

Tigres UANL

- Copa MX runner-up: 1989-90

=== International ===
Argentina

- FIFA World Cup: 1986
