= Álvaro de la Rosa =

Mexican footballer (born 2005)

Personal information
- Full name: Álvaro Alejandro de la Rosa Burgos
- Date of birth: 8 April 2005 (age 21)
- Place of birth: Puebla, Mexico
- Height: 1.72 m (5 ft 8 in)
- Position: Full-back

Team information
- Current team: Puebla
- Number: 195

Youth career
- 2021–2026: Puebla

Senior career*
Years	Team	Apps	(Gls)
2025–	Puebla	5	(1)
- * Club domestic league appearances and goals as of 7 October 2026

Álvaro Alejandro de la Rosa Burgos (born 8 April 2005) is a Mexican professional footballer who plays as a full-back for Liga MX club Puebla.

== Club career ==
De la Rosa began his career at the academy of Puebla before making his professional debut on 17 October 2025 against Tijuana, playing the full match and scoring a goal in a 4–3 win.

== Career statistics ==
=== Club ===
As of 7 October 2026

Club	Season	League			Cup		Continental		Club World Cup		Other		Total	
Club	Season	Division	Apps	Goals	Apps	Goals	Apps	Goals	Apps	Goals	Apps	Goals	Apps	Goals
Puebla	2025–26	Liga MX	5	1	—		—		—		—		5	1
Career total			5	1	0	0	0	0	0	0	0	0	5	1
