= Silvio Fogel =

Argentine footballer

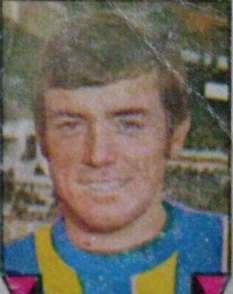
- Fogel in 1972

Personal information
- Full name: Carlos Silvio Fogel
- Date of birth: July 8, 1949
- Place of birth: Corrientes, Argentina
- Date of death: March 27, 2016 (aged 66)
- Place of death: Puebla
- Position: Striker

Senior career*
| Years | Team | Apps | (Gls) |
| 1971–1972 | Rosario Central | ? | |
| 1973–1974 | Torreón | | (12) |
| 1974–1975 | América | | |
| 1975–1983 | Puebla | | (84) |
| 1980–1981 | Cruz Azul | 7 | (1) |
- * Club domestic league appearances and goals

Silvio Fogel (July 8, 1949 – March 27, 2016) was an Argentine football player.

Fogel started his professional career with the Argentine club Rosario Central in 1971. He transferred to Primera División de México side Club de Fútbol Torreón in 1973. In 1974, he was transferred to Puebla FC, where he is still remembered as one of the best foreign players ever to play with the club. From 1974 to 1980 he managed to score 84 goals, placing himself second in the all-time goal-scoring list, just 3 behind Ricardo Alvarez who scored 87.

After he retired he kept a close relation with the clubs, doing numerous jobs inside the institution. He played in numerous commemorative veterans' games with Puebla FC.

Fogel lived in the city of Puebla, where he opened an Argentina restaurant. He died on March 27, 2016, due to a heart attack.
