= Arturo Álvarez (footballer, born 1959) =

Mexican footballer

Personal information
- Full name: Arturo Álvarez Perea
- Date of birth: October 18, 1959 (age 67)
- Place of birth: Mexico City, Mexico
- Position: Defender

Senior career*
Years	Team	Apps	(Gls)
1977–1979	Atlante	9	
1980–1987	Puebla		
1987–1988	→Cruz Azul (loan)	25	
1989–1992	Puebla		
1992–1993	→América(loan)	8	
1993–1996	Puebla	346	(12)

International career
1985–1989	Mexico	3	(0)
- * Club domestic league appearances and goals

Arturo Álvarez Perea (born October 18, 1959) was a Mexican first division player, who played most of his career with Puebla F.C. where he appeared in 346 first division games besides the Copa México and international appearances and also won the 1982–83 and 1989–90 first division titles. He began his career in 1977–78 with Atlante where he spent one year before playing with Puebla F.C. where he played for almost 15 years. He also spent two years out on loan from Puebla F.C. first in 1987–1988 tournament when he played for Cruz Azul and also in 1992–1993 tournament when he played for Club América where he only played in 8 games.

== Achievements ==
Título	Club	País	Año
Primera División	Puebla	Mexico	1982–1983
Primera División	Puebla	Mexico	1989–1990
Copa México	Puebla	Mexico	1989–1990
Campeón de Campeones	Puebla	Mexico	1989–1990
