= Parque El Mirador =

Football stadium in Puebla, Mexico

- Location: Puebla, Puebla
- Owner: Roberto Cortazar
- Operator: Puebla F.C.
- Capacity: 15,000
- Surface: Grass

Construction
- Opened: May 21, 1944
- Closed: 1957

Tenant
- Puebla F.C.

Parque El Mirador was a football stadium in Puebla, Puebla, Mexico (110 kilometres east of Mexico City).

The stadium seated 15,000 and was the home of Puebla F.C., one of the oldest and most important football teams in Mexico. “El Mirador” was constructed under the ownership of Roberto Cortazar in 1944 and was inaugurated in a friendly match against Atlante.

In 1957, Puebla folded due to economic problems, asking to withdraw from the league for what turned out to be eight years. That same year, the wooden stadium caught on fire; half of it burned down, and it was shut down for good.
