= Ricardo Álvarez (Mexican footballer) =

Mexican footballer

Personal information
- Full name: Ricardo Álvarez
- Date of birth: 1911
- Place of birth: Mexico
- Date of death: 1986 (aged 74–75)
- Position: Forward

Senior career*
Years	Team	Apps	(Gls)
1942–1943	Moctezuma de Orizaba		
1945–1950	Puebla	120	(87)
1951	Veracruz		
- * Club domestic league appearances and goals

Ricardo "La Changa" Álvarez (1911–1986) was a Mexican footballer who played as a forward. He was a Primera División (First Division) player who started his career playing in the amateur league in the 1930s with club Moctezuma de Orizaba. He later transferred to Puebla FC where he played 120 games over 5 years and scored 87 goals, and is remembered as a club icon. In 1950 he left to play for Veracruz where he played for a couple months before retiring. He scored 113 goals in his career.

== Club achievements ==
Title	Club	Country	Year
Copa México	Moctezuma de Orizaba	Mexico	1942–1943
Copa México	Puebla	Mexico	1944–1945
