= La Constancia Mexicana =

Museum in Mexico

Coordinates: 19°5′36″N 98°14′5″W

La Constancia Mexicana is a museum and former textile factory located 9 km (5.6 mi) from downtown Puebla, Mexico. The factory was the first textile mill to integrate automatic machinery into the production process.

== Site description ==
The factory was built within Santo Domingo Hacienda, which had an established hydrological infrastructure useful to textile manufacturing. The hacienda's architecture was updated to the 19th-century style, giving it a unique appearance. Thus, the factory introduced a new architectural style along with the new machinery.

== World Heritage status ==
This site was added to the UNESCO World Heritage Tentative List on December 6, 2004 in the Cultural category.

== Gallery ==
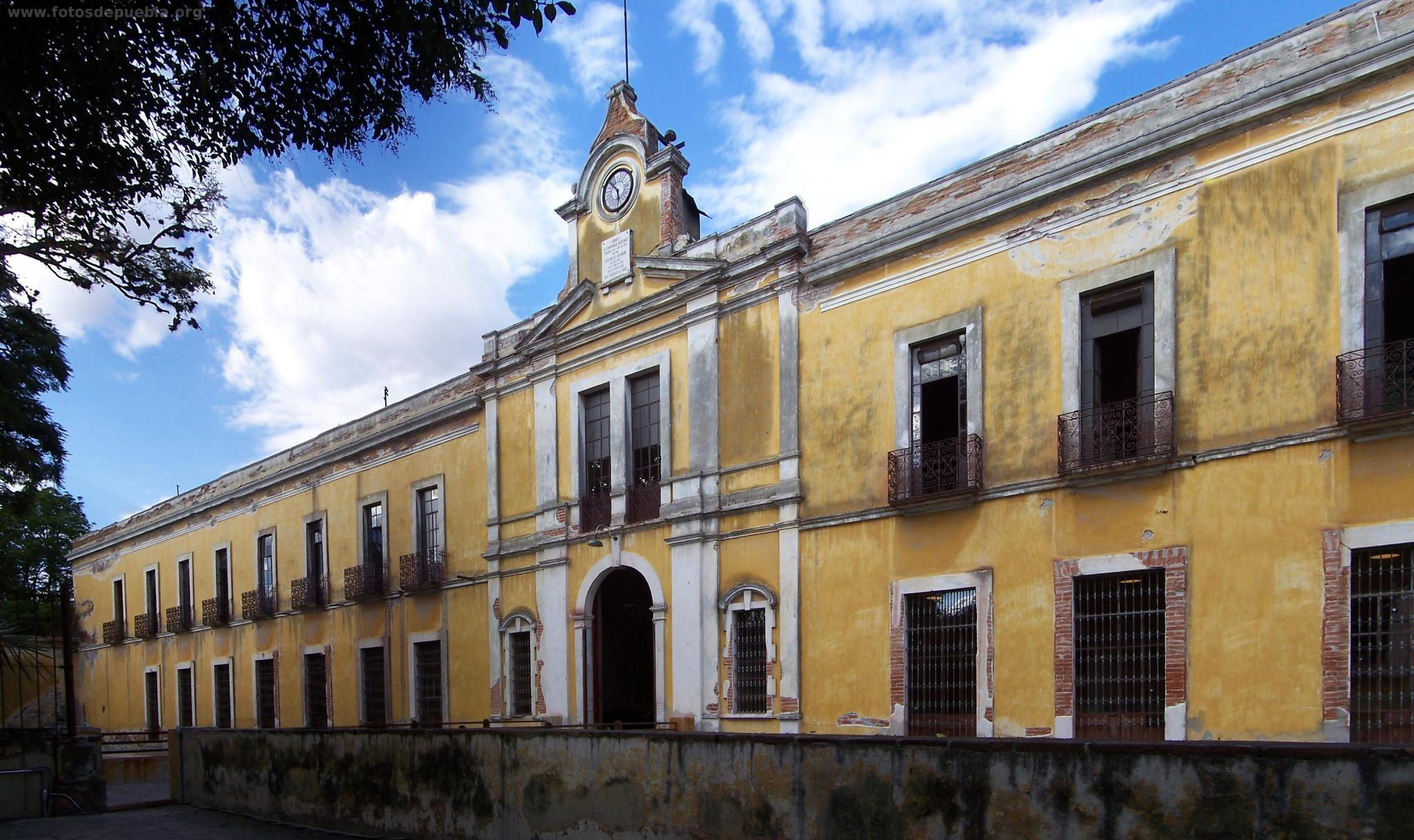
Facade, 2006

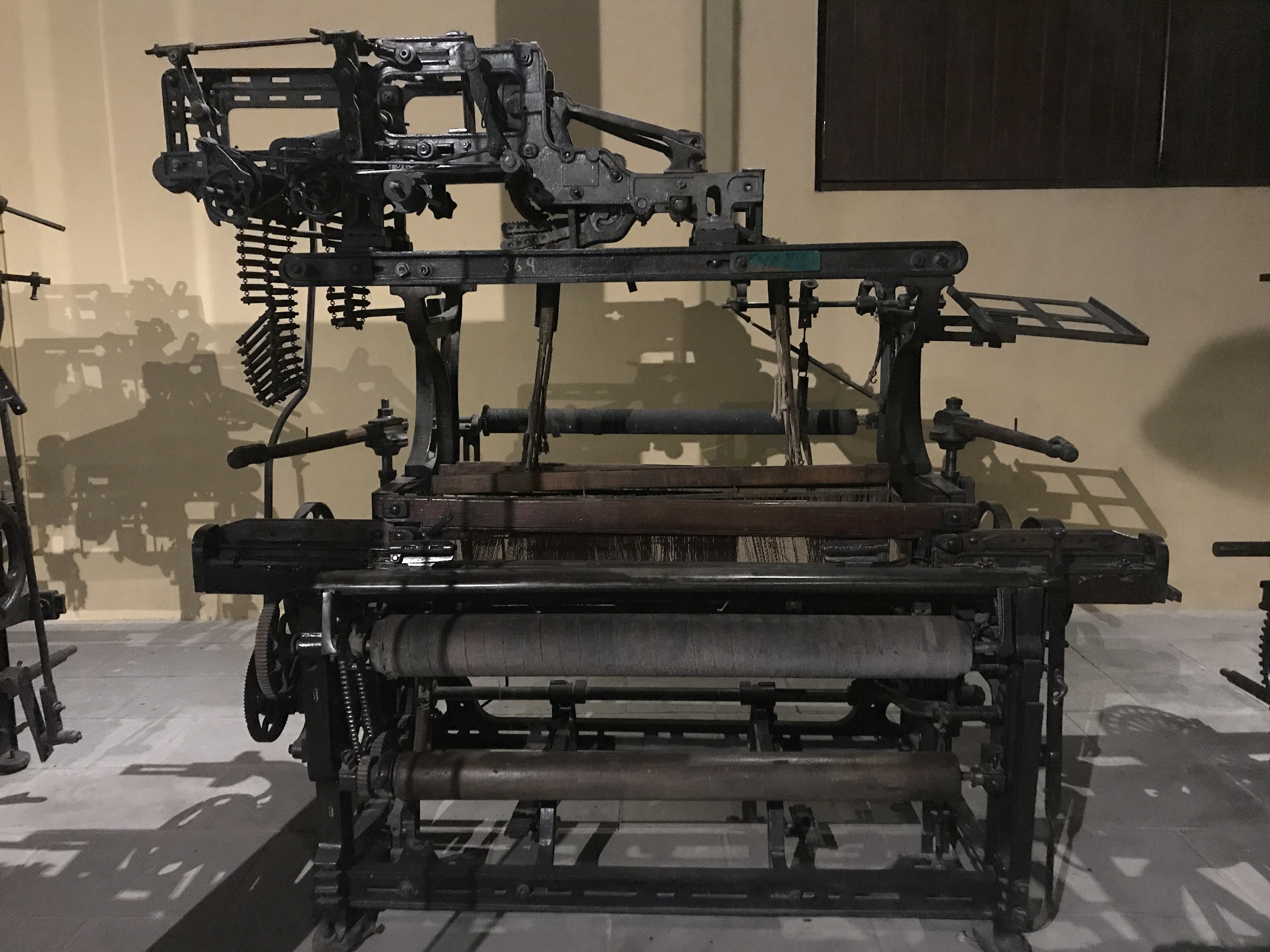
Old loom on display in the museum, 2017

== Externals links ==
- Official website (archived via the Wayback Machine)
