= Parque España =

Parque España may refer to:

- Parque de España
- Parque España (Mexico City)
- Shima Spain Village
