= Manuel Lapuente =

Mexican footballer and manager (1944–2025)

Personal information
- Full name: Manuel Lapuente Díaz
- Date of birth: 15 May 1944
- Place of birth: Teziutlán, Puebla, Mexico
- Date of death: 25 October 2025 (aged 81)
- Place of death: Puebla City, Puebla, Mexico
- Height: 1.70 m (5 ft 7 in)
- Position: Forward

Senior career*
Years	Team	Apps	(Gls)
1964–1966	Monterrey		
1966–1970	Necaxa		
1970–1974	Puebla		
1974–1975	Atlas		

International career
1967–1973	Mexico	13	(5)

Managerial career
- 1978–1984: Puebla
- 1984–1986: Tigres UANL
- 1986–1987: Ángeles de Puebla
- 1987–1988: Atlante
- 1988: Cruz Azul
- 1988–1993: Puebla
- 1991: Mexico (caretaker)
- 1994–1997: Necaxa
- 1997–2000: Mexico
- 2001: Atlante
- 2001–2003: América
- 2006: América
- 2008: Tigres UANL
- 2010–2011: América
- 2013: Puebla
Medal record
Men's football
Representing Mexico (as manager)
CONCACAF Gold Cup
Winner	1998 United States
FIFA Confederations Cup
Winner	1999 Mexico
Copa América
Third place	1999 Paraguay
- * Club domestic league appearances and goals

Manuel Lapuente Díaz (15 May 1944 – 25 October 2025) was a Mexican professional footballer and manager.

Over the course of more than three decades, Lapuente established himself as one of the most successful managers in Mexican football. He took charge of seven different clubs in Mexico and secured five Primera División championships with three of them. He is also remembered as the strategist who guided the Mexico national team to its greatest international triumph: the 1999 FIFA Confederations Cup.

== Career ==
Born in Puebla on 15 May 1944, Lapuente began his professional career with Monterrey in 1964. He later played for Necaxa, Puebla, and Atlas, before retiring in 1975. Although he never won a league title as a player, he did achieve international success with the Mexico national team, earning 13 caps and winning the gold medal at the 1967 Pan American Games in Winnipeg, Canada.

Following his retirement, Lapuente transitioned to coaching. In a managerial journey spanning 35 years, he took charge of iconic Mexican clubs such as Puebla, Tigres UANL, Ángeles de Puebla, Atlante, Cruz Azul, Necaxa, and América. His managerial achievements include five Primera División championships: Puebla (1982–83, 1989–90), Necaxa (1994–95, 1995–96), and América (Verano 2002).

His achievements at the club level earned him two appointments as manager of the Mexico national team. His first tenure, in 1990, was brief, encompassing only 11 matches. His second tenure, from 1997 to 2000, proved more significant, as it was during this period that Lapuente established his lasting legacy.

In 1999, he led Mexico to capture its most prestigious senior international title to date: the FIFA Confederations Cup. In a dramatic final at the Estadio Azteca, Mexico defeated Brazil, etching Lapuente’s name permanently into the annals of Mexican football.

Lapuente also coached Mexico at the 1998 FIFA World Cup in France. The team advanced from the group stage and was knocked out by Germany in the Round of 16.

== Death ==
Lapuente died on the afternoon of 25 October 2025, due to serious complications arising from severe pneumonia, which had been ongoing for several months. He was 81.

== Managerial statistics ==
Team	From	To	Record				
Team	From	To	G	W	D	L	Win %
Mexico	1997	2000	67	33	18	16	49.25
Total			67	33	18	16	49.25

== Honours ==
=== Manager ===
Puebla

- Mexican Primera División: 1982–83, 1989–90
- Copa México: 1989–90
- Campeón de Campeones: 1990
- CONCACAF Champions' Cup: 1991

Necaxa

- Mexican Primera División: 1994–95, 1995–96
- Copa México: 1994–95
- Campeón de Campeones: 1995

América

- Mexican Primera División: Verano 2002
- CONCACAF Champions' Cup: 2006

Mexico

- CONCACAF Gold Cup: 1998
- FIFA Confederations Cup: 1999
