= Club Puebla =

Mexican association football club

Puebla
- Full name: Club Puebla
- Nicknames: Los Camoteros (The Sweet Potatoers); La Franja (The Strip Band)
- Short name: PUE
- Founded: 7 May 1944; 82 years ago (as Puebla Fútbol Club)
- Stadium: Estadio Cuauhtémoc
- Capacity: 51,726
- Owner: Operadora de Escenarios Deportivos S.A. de C.V.
- President: Manuel Jiménez García
- Manager: Gerardo Espinoza
- League: Liga MX
- Clausura 2026: Regular phase: 17th of 18; Final phase: Not qualified
- Website: clubpuebla.com
Home colours	Away colours	Third colours

Club Puebla is a professional football club based in Puebla. The club competes in Liga MX, the highest level of Mexican football, and plays its home matches at Estadio Cuauhtémoc. Founded in 1944 as Puebla Fútbol Club, the club adopted its current name in 2016. Nicknamed La Franja, the team shirt features a diagonal stripe (traditionally blue on white on the home kit) that crosses the chest diagonally from right to left, which is considered a distinctive part of its identity. The club's debut in top-level league was in the 1944–45 season.

In domestic competitions, Club Puebla has won two Liga MX titles, five Copa MX titles, one Campeón de Campeones and one Supercopa MX. In international competitions, the club has won one CONCACAF Champions Cup and also finished as runners-up in the 1992 Copa Interamericana.

The club's first major title was the 1944–45 Copa México, defeating América 6–4 on aggregate, and won their first league title in the 1982–83 season, defeating Guadalajara 7–6 on penalties. Puebla won the 1991 CONCACAF Champions' Cup, defeating Police FC 4–2 on aggregate, which has been their only international title obtained.

== History ==
=== Early years ===
Puebla has competed since 1904, when an English Athletic club Puebla AC joined the Liga Mexicana de Football Amateur Association. The club was founded two years after the first known league was established in Mexico, Puebla along with Reforma, Pachuca, Albinegros de Orizaba, Mexico Cricket Club and British Club were the first teams to play any sort of organized football competition in Mexico. In their first tournament in 1904, the club lost all games and did not score a goal in the 8 games played. In 1905, the club struggled and managed to score its first and only goal in that tournament, finishing last with no wins, 1 draw and 7 losses, and 20 goals against. For the 1906–1907 season, the club finished third, with 3 wins, 3 losses and 2 draws, for a total of 9 points with 8 goals scored and 6 against. After this season, the club folded, and the league dropped to 4 clubs. The club would not see action for 8 years, until 1915 when the First Puebla F.C who later became España de Puebla, that club was founded by the Spaniards living in the city of Puebla. Due to the lack of opponents, having only one with neighboring town San Martín Texmelucan, the club would be forced to go Orizaba, Veracruz to find competition. They participated for a few years in the old Liga Veracruzana de Futbol.In 1918 Club Fútbol Asturias de Puebla was founded by the Spanish from the Asturias in Spain. These two clubs would later merge in the early 1940s and would become the foundation of what would become Club Puebla.

=== Professional Debut ===
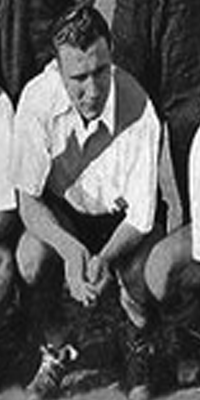
Eladio Vaschetto scored first goal in club's history.

It all came to be on March 28, 1944, when Puebla was admitted to the Primera División de México, their home ground was Parque El Mirador—the first owners, Joaquín Díaz Loredo and Alfonso Sobero were important textile owners in the 1940s. The first official match took place on May 7, 1944, at 4 p.m. in the city of Veracruz in the Copa México tournament. The Tiburones Rojos de Veracruz franchise gave Puebla their first lost in the professional era beating them 5–1. Puebla's first goal was scored by Lupe Velázquez in the 68th minute. Two weeks later at El Mirador the team played a friendly match against Atlante, losing 4–1. On July 4, 1944, Puebla obtained its first victory in El Mirador against Veracruz with a score of 3–4.

On August 20, 1944, Puebla played its first professional league match against Atlas, beating them 5–2. The Argentine forward scored Eladio Vaschetto Puebla's first goal in the professional league era. The first lost in the league was to Real Club España, losing 2–1 in Mexico City. In 24 games played in the 1944–45 league Puebla obtained 14 wins, 2 draws and 8 losses with 53 goals in favor and 30 against. That year Puebla was the league runner-up to Real Club España, but saved the season by winning the Copa México against América in a memorable match winning it 5–3. Ricardo Álvarez was the lead scorer, scoring 4 goals.

=== 1945 Copa México ===
In 1944, Puebla finished runner-up in the league championship and many thought they had been much better than the actual champions España. With a very good league tournament played, they also played the 1944 Copa México in which they showed why they finished second in the league by crowning themselves champions that year. The tournament started when Puebla faced Orizaba beating them 6–0 in both games. Arturo Chávez scored 5 goals in both games and ended as the tournaments lead scorer with 15 goals. In the quarter-finals stage, Puebla faced Atlas, a club that did not put up much of a fight and ended up losing 4–0. Arturo Chávez scored the 4 goals in that series. At semi-finals Puebla faced one of the best clubs in that tournament, Deportivo Oro. However, Puebla was playing better and defeated Oro 3–1 to advance to their first final ever.

At the final game on June 25, 1945, Puebla faced one of the most important clubs in Mexico América. Puebla came out in the first minute with the intention of winning the cup. They found themselves up 3–0 in the 26th minute, with 2 goals by Eladio Vaschetto and one from Arturo Chávez. América scored its first goal at the 43rd minute courtesy of Vial. The first half ended 3–1. In the second half, América came out to prove their status as an important club and went on the offense. With América looking for goals, Puebla found open spaces but they could not take advantage. In the 61st minute Manolo Alarcón scored a goal for América, and 3 minutes later Nicoluau scored another goal, and at the 69th minute Scarone scored yet another, reducing the deficit to a single goal. It seemed that América could achieve a historic comeback, but Puebla was a team with a lot of character and knew how to respond to América's 3 goals. In the 71 minute the legendary forward Miguel López scored for Puebla, giving them a comfortable 5–3 lead. Two minutes later Vial scored América's 4th goal bringing back the deficit to one goal. The last goal in the memorable final came in the 78 minute when Lupe Velázquez scored Puebla's 6th goal, which closed that spectacular game.

=== 1953 Copa México ===
During the 1952–53 season, Don Joaquín Díaz once again was the owner of the club and with "El Gordo", González Gatica, managed to obtain the club's second Copa México, beating León in the final. That off season, they reinforced the club by signing big name players such as "Chepe" Naranjo, Mota y Caserio. The club also played friendly games with European club Austria Wien and also big South American clubs. In the first game Puebla beat Leon 2–0. In the second game Puebla finished them off with a score of 2–1 for an aggregated score of 4–1. This way on 31 May 1953, Puebla was once again the Copa México champion. In the Campeón de Campeones, Puebla lost to the Tamaulipan club Tampico Madero just like they had in 1944. The team's manager (coach) was Spanish Isidro Lángara. The 4 goals scored by Puebla were by Fernández, Cubero, Velázquez, and Cubero. The starting line up were González (goalkeeper), Rivas, Torres Ruiz (defender), Cárdenas, Iturbe (midfielder), Lupe Velázquez, Uceda, Del Toro, Fernández, Cubero (forwards).

In 1953, the club managed to obtain its second Copa México title and the last title they would win for almost 30 years. After the 1955–56 league tournament the club's then-owner Manuel Hidalgo was abandoned by the other owners, and was not able to sustain the club. In 1956, his request to the Federación Mexicana de Fútbol (FMF) for the club to take a year hiatus to better their economic situation was discouraged; Hidalgo was told that if the club took time off, they would have to return in the Segunda División de México. The club folded in 1956 due to the loss of its stadium, the Parque El Mirador, which burned down due to a torch that was thrown into the wooden ramps. The total losses were 300 thousand pesos, which took the club out of action for 8 years.

=== 1960s ===
After numerous attempts, Manuel Sánchez Gómez, Leonardo Ortiz and Rafael Durá succeeded in reforming the stripe club, and Puebla returned to professional football. On February 19, 1964, the federation allowed the club to take part of the 1964–65 second division league tournament. Donato Alonso was coach of that squad and formed it with Segunda División players, amateur Puebla players and veteran 1950s players. The first game was played in the Estadio Ignacio Zaragoza against Correcaminos UAT which ended in a 2–2 draw. Roberto Torres and Francisco Escamilla scored for Puebla. The first victory was against Texcoco with a score of 4–1 and the club remained undefeated for the next 15 rounds, until they fell 1–0 to Correcaminos in Ciudad Victoria, Tamaulipas. Puebla finished in 6th place in this tournament.

Puebla played 6 years in the Segunda División from 1964 to 1970 until a promotional series was held between Unión de Curtidores, Club Deportivo Nacional and Naucalpan. Puebla won their 3 matches played in Olímpico Universitario. The third and final match of the series was played against Naucalpan with a score of 1–0 that granted Puebla the promotion to the Primera División. Gervasio Quiroz score the only goal in that game. The scores of the three games were 2–2 against Unión de Curtidores, 1–0 against Naucalpan, and 1–0 against Club Deportivo Nacional.

=== 1970s ===
The first game played in the Primera División after almost 20 years was against América, coach by Francisco González Gatica puebla felt 2–0 in the Estadio Azteca. The first draw was a 1–1 against Pumas in c.u. Their first victory was against Cruz Azul in Estadio Cuauhtémoc with a score of 2–0. In this tournament, Puebla obtained 11 victories, 10 draws and 13 losses, finishing with 43 points occupying the 11th position of 18 in the leagues competition. With 2 games left, Puebla was in serious trouble of being regulated, so the club replaced coach Francisco González Gatica for the Spanish Ángel Zubieta. He managed to win the last 2 games and maintain the category.

In the 1971–72 tournament, the club finished in 7th place in the standings, but failed to classify for the play-offs because Monterrey and Guadalajara finished with the same points, although they had a greater goal differential.

In the 1972–73 tournament, the club started with a very strong style of playing that had them in second place in the standings with 6 matches left in the tournament, but Puebla lost 5 of the last 6 games, finishing in 10th place overall and failed to qualify once again.

In the 1973–74 tournament, Puebla finally managed to qualify for the quarter-finals, after finishing in 4th place overall with 13 victories, 14 draws and only 7 losses. In the quarters they faced Cruz Azul. The away game ended in a 1–1 draw, but in the second match Cruz Azul beat Puebla with a score of 6–1, which eliminated them. Cruz Azul went on to win the final against Atlético Español.

In the 1975–76 tournament, had a string of 11 games without a victory and the Puebla players received 25 red cards, Puebla was in danger of being relegated or forced to play a relegation match. Puebla avoided that scenario by finishing 18th overall and leaving that scenario to Atlante and San Luis, which was relegated to the Segunda División.

In the 1977–78 tournament, Puebla once against had a terrible time and lost 20 games which once again put them in danger of relegation. But in the last round, they managed to draw with Tigres in Monterrey, Nuevo León and forced Atlas and Unión de Curtidores to contest relegation, with Unión de Curtidores who at the end was regulated to the Segunda División. Silvio Fogel was the club's star player who scored 21 goals and help the club forget its relegation problems. Puebla finished in 7th place overall, but failed to qualify for the play-offs, in the last round the club tied with América and combined with a win by Toluca, they missed the play-offs.

In the 1979–80 tournament, the club finished in 13th place overall with 11 victories and 16 losses. Therefore, they also came to an end a decade where the club played mostly to avoid being relegated.

=== 1980s ===
In the 1980–81 tournament, the club finished in 12th place overall and obtained 37 points by means of 12 victories, 13 draws and 13 losses. The club scored 37 goals that tournament. In this tournament the Brazilian player Muricy Ramalho joined the club and scored 7 goals, becoming a player that would go down in history with the club. In this tournament, the club used the city as its badge.

In the 1981–82 tournament, Puebla was placed in group 1, the club went on to finish in 3rd place overall with 41 points in 38 games played in which the club obtain 15 victories, 11 draws and 12 losses. The club scored 58 goals, but with all these points gained, the club still failed to qualify, finishing 10th in the league. Players who made up this squad were Moisés Camacho, Jesús Llangostera, Jesús Rico, Arturo Alvarez, Héctor Rosete, Miguel Ángel Viveros, Fco. Thomsom, J. Benito Cucula, Carlos Gómez, Ignacio Ramírez (1 Goal), Juan Carlos Contreras, Jorge Saenz, Ángel Ramos (2 goals), José Martínez Pirri (9 goals), Gustavo Béltran (5 goals), Juan

Manuel Rangel, Eusebio Martínez, Juan Manuel Asensi 11 goals, Juan Manuel Borbolla 7 goals, C. S. Idigoras 12 goals, Juan Alvarado 1 goal, Muricy Ramalho 11 goals and coached by Leonel Urbina.

=== 1982–1983 title ===
At the start of the 1982 league championship, the few who believed Puebla could win included new coach Manuel Lapuente. Lapuente had played for Puebla for over five years and now had the chance to manage the club. He qualified the club with a record of 15 victories, 15 draws, and 8 losses, for a total of 45 points with 53 goals for and 39 against. In the play-off they faced three clubs from Jalisco.

Their first opponent was Tecos de la UAG in the quarter-finals. In the first, match Puebla was defeated 2–1 in a game played at Guadalajara, Jalisco. In the second game, Puebla defeated Tecos 5–1 for an aggregated score of 6–3. In the semi-finals, they faced Universidad de Guadalajara. Puebla lost the first match played in the Estadio Jalisco 1–0. In the second match, Puebla was able to overcome the deficit and won 4–2 and advance with an aggregated score of 4–3. In the final, Puebla benefited after a fight in semifinals between América and Guadalajara, leaving Guadalajara with a number of players suspended. In the first match, Guadalajara defeated Puebla 2–1 in the Estadio Jalisco. In the second game, played in a packed Estadio Cuauhtémoc, a goal scored by Alberto Orozco sent the game into overtime and then to a penalty shootout. Luis Enrique Fernández scored the final penalty goal which gave Puebla its first league title in the professional era. The line up in that final game included Toño de la Torre, Rubens Sambueza, Orozco, Luis Enrique Fernández, Pedro Soto, Raúl Arias, Muricy, Ángel Ramos, Arturo Álvarez, Estupiñan and Chaplin Ceballos.

=== 1988 Copa México ===
On May 26, 1988, Emilio Maurer acquired the club and his first action was to substitute coach Luis Enrique Fernández by Hugo Fernández. Hugo led the team to the 1988 league quarter-finals but was eliminated by America with a score of 6–2. For the 1988 Copa México, Puebla reinforced by signing Arturo Castañon, Wana Contreras, the Chilean defender Oscar Rojas and the forward Jorge Aravena. In the quarter-finals Puebla defeated Toluca in the Estadio Cuauhtémoc before more than 40 thousand fans in a night game that had not being played in Puebla for more than 3 years. In semi-finals, Puebla defeated Monterrey to advance to their fifth Copa México final, having won 2 and lost 2. In the final, Puebla faced Cruz Azul. The first match ended with a 1–1 draw. Scoring for Puebla was the midfielder Marcelino Bernal, while Mojica scored the Cruz Azul goal. The second match ended with a 0–0 draw and Puebla was awarded the cup for the goal scored as visitant in the first match played in the Estadio Azteca. Puebla starting line up were Aguilar (goalkeeper), Torres, Gamal, Roberto Ruiz Esparza, Amador (Rosete) (defender), Marcelino Bernal, Cosío, Bartolotta (midfielders), Paúl Moreno, Ramos, Omar Mendiburu and Gustavo Moscoso (forwards).

=== Campeonismo 1989–90 ===
In 1989, Lapuente led the club to a third place, finishing with 46 points by means of 17 victories, 12 draws and 9 losses, with 57 goals in favor and 42 against. In quarter-finals, Puebla faced Correcaminos UAT. The first game was won by Correcaminos by 3–1, while the second game was won by Puebla 3–1. In this way, the series ended even 4–4. However, Puebla advanced to quarter-finals because they had a better league standing than Correcaminos. In semi-finals, Puebla faced Pumas. The first match finished tied 4–4. The second match was won by Puebla 4–2 in the Estadio Olímpico Universitario. In the final, Puebla faced Universidad de Guadalajara. In the first match, Puebla defeated U. de Guadalajara 2–1 with goals by Jorge Aravena and Carlos Poblete, Octavio Mora scored U. de Guadalajara only goal. In the second game, played in Estadio Cuauhtémoc with an attendance of over 60,000 supporters, the stadium was full to over its capacity, stairs and hallways even in the roof people witness that game that set a record in attendance in a professional game ever played in the city of Puebla, Puebla defeated U. de Guadalajara 4–3 with goals by Javier "Chicharo" Hernández, two goals from Jorge Aravena and Carlos Poblete. The visiting club's goals were scored by Daniel Guzmán, Jorge Daválos and an own goal by Roberto Ruiz Esparza.

=== 1990 Copa México ===
In the 1989–90 league, Puebla defeated Universidad de Guadalajara in the finales obtaining their second league title. On April 11, 1990, Puebla obtained the Copa México which would make them the 4th campeonisimo in history. Only 3 other clubs had won the league and the cup the same year: León in 1949, Guadalajara in 1963, and Cruz Azul in 1970. In that final Puebla faced Tigres. The first match was played in Monterrey in the Estadio Universitario and the game ended there with a score of 2–0 in Tigres' favor. Goals were scored by Almirón and Gama. The second game was played in Puebla in a packed Estadio Cuauhtémoc. That game ended 4–1 in favor of Puebla. Puebla's goals were score by Edgardo Fuentes, Carlos Poblete, Jorge Aravena and Marcelino Bernal. Almirón scored Tigres' only goal that day. Puebla line up were Aguilar (goalkeeper), Torres, Gamal, Ruiz Esparza, Amador (Rosete) (defenders), Bernal, Cosío, Bartolotta (midfielders), Paúl Moreno, Ramos (Mendiburu) and Moscoso (forwards).

The 1989–90 squad is well remembered as the best squad ever to wear Puebla FC slash and is remembered by the supporters and media as the Campeonísimo. The starting line up included Pablo Larios as goalkeeper, Arturo Álvarez, Eduardo Fuentes, Roberto Ruiz Esparza, and Arturo "Mango" Orozco as defenders; Marcelino Bernal, José Manuel de la Torre, Jorge Aravena and Javier "Chícharito" Hernández as midfielders, and Carlos Poblete, alongside Julio César Romero forwards With Manuel Lapuente as head coach.

=== Difficult times ===
In the 1991–92 championship, Puebla managed to reach their fourth final in its history. Puebla lost that final against León in overtime with a score of 2–0.

The 1992–93 championship marked the start of a difficult period in the club. The tournament started with problems with the Federación Mexicana de Fútbol. The owner, Emilio Maurer Espinoza, was accused of irregularities in his administration and was stripped of the club and expelled from the league. That year, Puebla finished 4th in group 2, with 43 points, and did not qualify.

In the 1993–94 championship, Puebla finished in 3rd place overall in group 1 with 34 points.

In the 1994–95 championship, Puebla, after an irregular tournament, finishing in 3rd in group 3 with 40 points and managed to qualify to a knockout series against Veracruz. Puebla defeated Veracruz 1–0, but they were eliminated in quarter-finals by América with an overall score of 4–2.

In the 1995–96 championship, Puebla changed owners and the brothers Abed came to power. That year was one of club's worst tournaments in Puebla's history and they finished in last place with 28 points by means of 6 victories, 10 draws, and 18 losses with 29 goals for and 54 against.

In 1997, Puebla welcomed the short tournament era in white an orange home kit. Nonetheless, that tournament was a success and qualified to the quarter-finals after getting 31 points in group 2. In quarter-finals, Puebla eliminated Toluca by a score of 2–1. In semi-finals, however, Puebla was eliminated by Necaxa with an aggregated score of 7–2. In this tournament the Spanish Carlos Muñoz got the first scoring title in Puebla's history with 15 goals scored in 17 games. Carlos also holds the record of most goals scored in one game in the history of the short tournaments, scoring 4 goals against Tecos de la UAG in 1996 and 4 goals against Monarcas Morelia in 1998.

After three years as owners of the club, the brothers Abed dismantled the club and sold it to Francisco Bernad Cid, who along with Francisco Regordosa made up the directors board. They brought back the traditional crest and colors. In that position, the coach Raúl Cárdenas did not ask for any players from the draft and brought five players from Yugoslavia which were a disappointment. This tournament was the worst in the club's history, with only 9 points in 2 victories, 3 draws, and 12 losses, with 13 goals in favor and 41 against. The club's lead scorer was Aleksandar Janjic with a couple of goals.

In the summer of 1999 the story was not different from the prior years. Alfredo Tena took over as coach and brought some reinforcements as Martín Ubaldi, François Omam Biyik, Rubén Ruiz Díaz, and Miguel Pardeza. Puebla did not improve, and Tena was replaced by José Mari Bakero as coach. The team played worse, and in the last round, they tied against Monterrey and were relegated to the Segunda División for the second time since 1964 when the club was formed. The numbers were 3 victories, 4 ties and 10 losses, with 15 goals for and 30 against, for a total of 13 points.

Unión de Curtidores purchase

When everyone thought that Puebla would play in the Segunda División, during the league's draft, the sale was announced of León by Valente Aguirre to Francisco Bernat, who on June 21 announced that León was going to convert into Puebla F.C. Then, Valente Aguirre said that there was no way León would be moving out of its hometown in León, Guanajuato. In response, Francisco Bernat said, "If we bought the club was to move it to Puebla, we're from Puebla and it's our duty to our fans to have a club in the first division... now, if they want the club to remain in León, they'll have to pay us the 9 millions that we paid". That situation gave way to an uproar from the supporters of León who did not want their club disappearing. On June 23, it was announced that Puebla would remain in the Primera División, also that León would remain in León, Guanajuato by purchasing Unión de Curtidores, the other team based in León. Only the players changed teams. Puebla took the players from León, and León took the players from Curtidores. The club that was relegated would be relocated to the city of Puebla and become Lobos BUAP.

=== 21st century ===
Puebla obtained only 20 points in the Verano 1999 tournament, and José Mari Bakero was replaced by Mario Carrillo as coach. In the summer of 2000, Miguel Mejia Barón took over as head coach, and the club qualified for quarter-finals, after beating Atlas 5–1, when they lost 9–0 on aggregate to Toluca. They again reached the quarter-finals the following season, where they beat Tigres 5–3. In the semi-finals against Santos Laguna, Puebla won a dramatic first leg 5–4. The second leg finished 2–1 to Santos, with Puebla being knocked out due to their inferior league-standing.

In 2004, with 115 points in 110 matches in over 3 years, the club's percentage was 1.0454. Having finished bottom of the division, Puebla was relegated for the third time. In the Primera División 'A' tournament, Puebla started with a new board of directors, and Emilio Maurer named Jorge Aravena as head coach. Puebla finished the season in 3rd place, with 33 points, and faced Chivas Coras in the end of season tournament. After defeating Chivas Coras, they drew with Santos Laguna, but advanced, thanks to a superior league finish. In the final, Puebla met Cruz Azul Oaxaca, who had finished top of the table. After drawing the first match 1–1, Puebla won the second leg, in the city of Oaxaca, 1–0, giving them the 2005 Primera A title. Jorge Aravena resigned as head coach, and was succeeded by Paul Moreno.

At the start of the Clausura 2006, once again Puebla fell victim to very poor administration errors. First, they let go of Eudalio Arriaga and brought Leandro Alvez and Carlos María Morales. Second, they changed coaches, provoking the club to fall into last place with 14 points. When they played the promotion match, they brought in as head coach César Luis Menotti, who took the club to Argentina for a short pre-season action and later they named César Luis Menotti as coach. With all this going on, when the day came to face Querétaro, the club was not at 100% and fell in the first match 1–2 in the Estadio Cuauhtémoc and 3–0 in the Estadio La Corregidora.

At the start of the 2006 Apertura, once again they had built a plan in order for the club's promotion to the Primera División. The owners started off first by naming José Luis Sánchez Solá, who was not known and by some was not accepted and criticized harshly. José Luis Sánchez Solá had previously worked with the club's inferior division, with players such as Juan Carlos García, Sergio Rosas, Sergio Pérez, Rodrigo Salinas, Luis Miguel Noriega and the goalkeeper Jorge Villalpando, who he brought up to the first team and were crucial players that year. He also brought in veteran player Álvaro González, who went on to win to scoring titles in 2006 and 2007. He also brought in the unknown at the time, an amateur player Jorge Damián "El Ruso" Zamogilny who quickly became a fan favorite. In the 3rd round of the tournament, the club defeated Tampico Madero 2–0, and snapped a 15-match winless streak. The club qualified to the play-offs after finishing first in the first group, with 33 points. In the play-off, they faced Coatzacoalcos, beating them 5–3. In semi-finals, they faced Cruz Azul Hidalgo, which they ended up drawing a 2–2 tie, which Puebla would advance for better position in the tournament. In the finale, Puebla faced Salamanca who was the leader in the tournament that year. The first match was a 1–1 draw, played in the Estadio Cuauhtémoc, with a little over 40,000 Puebla supporters. In the second game, the clubs once again tied, now with a score of 2–2. That finale was decided in a penalty shoot out which Puebla won, after Jorge Zamogilny scored the fifth goal and Adrián Domínguez missed Salamanca's fifth goal.

In the Clasura 2007, the club had a better tournament than the previous, finishing 1st place in group one, with 36 points and once again Álvaro González winning the goal scoring title with 15. In quarter-finals they would face Pumas Morelos, winning that series with a score of 4–3.

They advanced and faced León in semi-finals. The first match was played in the Nou Camp in León, with a score of 2–0, with Leon taking home advantage. The second match was played in Puebla in the Estadio Cuauhtémoc, with over 45,000 Puebla supporters. That game ended in a 3–3, in a match that is still talked about today, and that some speculate has started a riverbed between these 2 clubs. Puebla waited for the champion of the Clausura 2007 that would be disputed by León and Dorados de Sinaloa. Dorados would be that champion 4–5, and so faced Puebla in a promotional match to determine the club that would be promoted to the Primera División. The first match was played in the Estadio Carlos González in Sinaloa. The game would finish in a 1–1 draw. Scoring for Puebla was the lead scoring champion Álvaro González, and Carlos Casartelli for Dorados. The second game was played on May 26, 2007, in a packed Estadio Cuauhtémoc, with over 50000 fans, which the club later would be cited for being over-capacity. Puebla defeated Dorados with a score of 3–2, Álvaro González scored 2 goals in the '8, and in the '45 Hugo Ruiz scored the second in the '26. Scoring for the Dorados were Mario Padilla and Lucas Silva. The promotion had finally come, after 2 years of being relegated from the Primera División.

Players who took part of this achievement in 2007 were: Orlando Rincón, Sergio Pérez, Luis Miguel Noriega, Sergio Rosas, Jorge Villalpando, Álvaro González, Jorge Damián El Ruso Zamogilny and the captain Joaquín Velázquez.

In the Apertura 2007 tournament, the club hosted América in the first round, after 2 years of absence. The club finished with 17-point by means of 4 wins, 5 draws and lost 8. The squad was mostly formed with players who obtain the promotion and was poorly reinforce with poor reinforcement such as players Mateo Figoli and Juan Quiroga. The starting line up: were Lupe "La Pantera Rosa", Walter Vílchez, "El Ruso" Zalmogilny, Quiroga, Adrián Sánchez, "El Bola", Velázquez, Noriega, Hugo Ruíz, Orlando Rincón and Mateo Figoli.

At the end off the Apertura 2007, Puebla was once again involved in scandal. Then, a Mexican newspaper company stated that the club had been sold to a Brazilian businessman, Aurelio Almeida, owner of the Brazilian club Real Brazil. A day after this came to surface, owner Francisco Bernat held a conference where he stated that the club had not being sold, claiming that his signature had been forged. After weeks of speculations, it was on November 21 when it was decided that the contract and signatures were not valid.

In the Clausura 2008, the club made a complete reconstruction, with 12 new players including: Gilberto Mora, Melvin Brown, Felipe Ayala, Javier Cámpora and Nicolas Olivera. It would seem that the club would not have any problem avoiding relegation, but at mid-tournament, the club had fallen to the bottom. So, manager José Luis Sánchez Solá "El Chelis" was fired. This stirred up problems with the fans and the players, leading to the board of directors reversing the decision. With the manager back in the club, they beat their direct opponent in relegation, Tiburones Rojos de Veracruz in the city of Veracruz. In the 16th round the club officially avoided regulation after Veracruz had lost to Pumas. In the last game played in Puebla, the club faced Atlante and drew 2–2, which kept them out of the play-off that year.

In the Apertura 2008, the club managed 15 points by means of 2 wins, 9 draws and 6 losses. Mario Carrillo took over as coach after José Luis Sánchez Solá was let go. In mid tournament, Mario Carrillo separated long time club players Álvaro González and Joaquín Velázquez from the club, with the excuse of not attending a psychic reading by his personal psychic Mama Tona. At the end of the tournament, both players were released, and weeks later, Mario Carrillo was replaced once again by José Luis Sánchez Solá.

In the Clausura 2009, Puebla started out the off season by signing veteran players Daniel Osorno and Duilio Davino along with foreign players Ramón Núñez and Alejandro Acosta. The club started off the season by first falling 4–0 to Monterrey, in Monterrey, which concerned the fans and the owners. However, the players quickly adapted to their new teammates and went on to lose only one match in their next 10 matches. They finished the tournament with 26 points by means of 7 wins 6 draws and 6 losses. The club qualified to the quarterfinals for the first time since 2001 and faced Monterrey in their first match. Having Monterrey beat 4–0 in the first game of the tournament, no one gave Puebla a chance, but in the first match, Puebla surprised everyone by winning 3–1 goals by Gerardo Galindo 4' (own goal), Alejandro Acosta in the 6' and Sergio Pérez in the 56', Humberto Suazo scored Monterrey's only goal in the 48'. In the second game held in the Estadio Tecnológico in Monterrey, the clubs drew a 2–2 draw, with a final score of 5–3 advancing Puebla to face Pumas in The semi-finals. In the first game played in a jam-packed Estadio Cuauhtémoc in Puebla, Puebla fell 2–1 in a last-minute goal scored by Marco Antonio Palacios. In the second game played in the Estadio Olímpico Universitario, Puebla came out strong scoring the 2 goals that would advance them to the finals but in the minute 89' Darío Verón scored for Pumas. The game ended in a 2–1 victory for Puebla, but the final score was a 3–3 draw, which advance Pumas to the finals where they would eventually defeat Pachuca.

At the end of the tournament, having finished in 5th place overall along with Monterrey, both clubs qualified to the 2009 Copa Sudamericana. Shortly after the Federación Mexicana de Fútbol protested against the CONMEBOL, after clubs Guadalajara and San Luis were being discriminated very badly and about to be disqualified from the Copa Libertadores after the Swine flew had broken out in Mexico, claiming they were a health hazard to the rest of the clubs, some clubs even refuse to play their games in Mexico. With this problem at hand the federation decide to pull out of all CONMEBOL tournament which were the Copa Libertadores, Copa Sudamericana and the Copa América which Mexico had been a part of since the early 1990s. After both sides came to an agreement Mexico decided to return to the competition but this time the CONCACAF decided not to allow Mexico to take part of the Copa Sudamericana claiming that the Mexican clubs should focus more in the CONCACAF Champions League which was its own domestic tournament.

In the Apertura 2009, the club began the tournament by signing players Jared Borgetti, Nicolás Martínez, Nicolás Vigneri, Carlos "El Pescadito" Ruíz and the return of Joaquín Velázquez and Nicolás Olivera, who had been on loan to Tiburones Rojos de Veracruz. The club quickly adapted with the new players and did not see a loss until the 10th round. It was a controversial game were Puebla lost against Monterrey due to bad calls and a disallowed goal that was proven to be legit. The club once again finished with 26 points, by means of 6 wins 9 draws and 4 losses, which qualified them to the quarter-finals. Cruz Azul was the opponent in that series, and the first match was held in Puebla, where the game ended in a 4–4 draw with Puebla scoring 4 goals in the first half. Cruz Azul scored 2 polemic goals which determined to be crucial in the outcome of the series. The second match was held in the Estadio Azul; the game ended in a 3–2 victory for Cruz Azul, where once again controversy occurred, when Cruz Azul scored its first goal that was a clear offside. Cruz Azul advanced and eventually made it to the final, which they lost to Monterrey. And so it came to an end, with Puebla having qualified to 2 consecutive playoffs, not since the 1991–1992 tournament.

At the start of 2010, Puebla along with América, Monterrey, Jaguares de Chiapas, Estudiantes Tecos, Santos Laguna, Tigres and Atlante played the 2010 InterLiga. Puebla finished first in group B with 2 wins no draws and 1 loss, scored 6 goals and allowed 3 for a total of 6 points. The club qualified for the final in which they faced group A second place which was Estudiantes Tecos. That match took place on January 13, 2010 and was played in front of 27,000 in The Home Depot Center. Puebla's Alejandro Acosta scored the first goal in the fourth minute of play followed by Nicolás Olivera goal in the 47'. In the second half, Estudiantes Tecos scored 3 consecutive goals and so qualifying to the 2010 Copa Libertadores.

In the Clausura 2010, the club started off the preseason by signing players Marcelo Palau, Herculez Gómez and Alexandro Álvarez also bringing back players Álvaro Fabián González, Hiber Ruíz and Marco Capetillo who had not played since 2007. The club started the tournament by losing 1–0 to Tigres at home. The club won its sound game 3–2 against Estudiantes Tecos on the road. The club would not fair to good having the 2nd worst defense in the league but tied third for the best offense, finishing 13 overall with a record of 5 wins 4 draws losing 8, a scoring 28 goals allowing 31 for a total of 19 points. Herculez Gómez led the club as well as the league in goals scored with ten. That tally earned him the goal scoring title in a tie with Javier Hernández. However, Herculez Gómez had scored his 10 goals in fewer minutes played than the other two, scoring 6 of his goals coming in as a substitute.

A crisis came into the club with owner Ricardo Henaine, until he resigned, this caused the ninth spell of manager José Luis Sánchez Solá as puebla manager.

== Crest ==
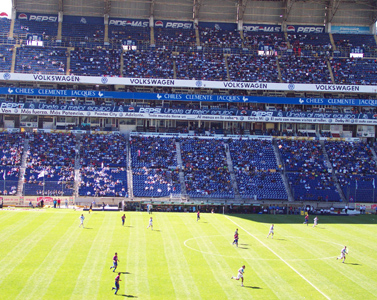
Cuauhtemoc Stadium during a match.

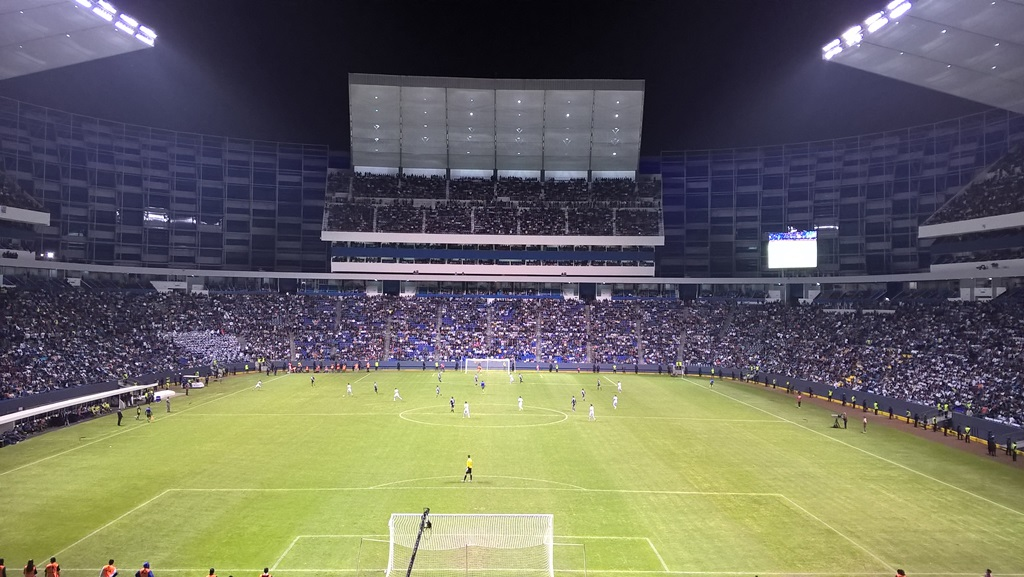
Match against Boca Juniors (Re-opening)

The first crest worn by the club was simply the city's coat of arms, which depicts the image of the Puebla Cathedral surrounded by angels. With this crest, the club obtained its first two titles, the Copa México in 1945 and then in 1953. The club used this crest from 1944 to 1971. In 1972, the club introduced a new crest, the first one specifically designed for the team, featuring the now traditional sash. The club used this crest from 1974 to 1980. In 1981, the club used a commemorative crest celebrating the 450 anniversary of the city's foundation. In 1982, when the club obtained its first league title, the crest featured a simple blue football with the club's name at the top and the country's name at the bottom. In 1983, the club started using the first design of the now traditional crest which has the club's name with a sash running from left to right inside a blue shield. The club used this crest design from 1983 to 1994. Initially it featured one star to represent the 1983 league title, but in 1990 an additional star was added to represent their second league title, obtained that year. In 1995, after the club changed ownership, the new administration changed the club's crest to a more simple design that featured the blue sash, with a new club's name at the top left La Franja (The Sash), a football at the bottom right, and two crowns at the top representing the two league titles. In 1996, the management changed the club's identifying color to orange, changing also the sash color in the crest. In 1998, after another change in ownership, the new administration reverted the color to blue and the crest to the pre-1995 design, although in a more stylized way. In 2016, a new crest was introduced due to legal problems related to the ownership of the brand and crest. The new crest featured a round design with elements taken from the city's coat of arms. In 2018, the current crest design was introduced, which features a modernized look of the 1983 design, after the resolution of the legal troubles that forced the change in 2016. The club has also used various commemorative crests celebrating anniversaries of the club's foundation.

Current manufacturer: Pirma.

Current sponsors: Banco Azteca, Ciudad Maderas, Volkswagen, Caliente.mx, Tamariz, Corona Extra, Nikko Autopartes, Terrawind Global Protection, Flanax, Totalplay, Carl's Jr., Hospital Ángeles, Beriscan PRO, Clínicas Recovery, Nelson Vargas, IKEA, Dairy Queen, Gatorade, Perdura, McCarthy's Irish Pub and Pagaqui.

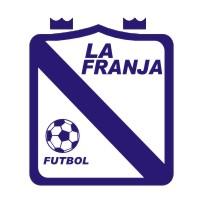
Crest used from 1994 to 1995

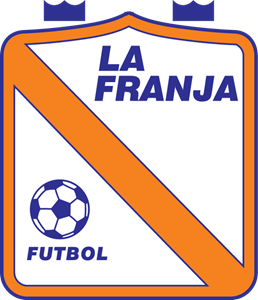
Crest used from 1995 to 1998

Crest used from 2017 to 2018

== Honours ==
Domestic
Type	Competition	Titles	Seasons	Runners-up
Top level FMF	Liga MX	2	1982–83, 1989–90	1944–45, 1991–92
Top level FMF	Copa MX	5	1944–45, 1952–53, 1987–88, 1989–90, Cla–2015	Ape–2014
Top level FMF	Campeón de Campeones	1	1990	1945, 1953, 1988
Top level FMF	Supercopa MX	1^{s}	2015	—
Lower levels FMF	Primera División A	2	Ape–2005, Ape–2006	—
Lower levels FMF	Campeón de Ascenso	1	2007	2006
Lower levels FMF	Segunda División	0	—	Mex–1970
Lower levels FMF	Copa México Segunda División	0	—	1968–69
International
Type	Competition	Titles	Seasons	Runners-up
Intercontinental CONCACAF CONMEBOL	Copa Interamericana	0	—	1992
Continental CONCACAF	CONCACAF Champions Cup	1	1991	—

Notes

- record
- ^{s} shared record

== Rivalries ==
=== El Clásico Del Sur ===
Puebla had a long-standing rivalry with Veracruz, named El Clásico Del Sur, which is Southern Mexico's rivalry series. This regional rivalry dates back to the amateur era from the early 1930s, before both clubs had been admitted into the professional division in 1944.

In all Puebla and Veracruz have played 68 official matches including league and Copa México. Puebla has the best record with 30 wins 15 draws and 23 losses with 108 goals scored and has allowed 97. Jorge Comas has the most goals scored in this derby with 8 followed by Puebla's Silvio Fogel with 7.

In 2019, Veracruz faced economic issues and was later disaffiliated with the Liga MX, effectively dissolving the team and making the rivalry dormant.

=== El Clásico Poblano ===
Puebla has also enjoyed another rivalry, with the other local football team in the city, Lobos BUAP, called El Clasico Poblano. Lobos had been in the second division of Mexico, and for that reason, they have not had that many encounters, until Lobos BUAP got promoted to Liga MX. The first Clasico Poblano in Liga MX was played on November 17, 2017, and was won by Lobos BUAP, which won 1-0 at Puebla. Prior to that, Puebla had not lost a Clasico Poblano. Their last official match was in the Liga MX Spring ‘19 season, at BUAP, which Puebla won 3-0.

In 2019, Lobos BUAP faced financial difficulty, and as a result, the team had to fold. The team which would eventually be known as Bravos de Ciudad Juarez bought the franchise, effectively giving Juarez a spot in Liga MX and leaving Puebla without a rival team.

== Club records and statistics ==
All time statistics from all tournaments and league divisions in which the club has taken part in the Mexican Football Federation and the CONCACAF since 1944.

=== Season to season ===
Season	Division	League	Cup
1943–44	No participation	No participation	K.O Stage
1944–45	1st Division	2	Champion
1945–46	1st Division	3	Quarter-finals
1946–47	1st Division	4	Semi-finals
1947–48	1st Division	3	Quarter-finals
1948–49	1st Division	4	K.O Stage
1949–50	1st Division	7	K.O Stage
1950–51	1st Division	7	K.O Stage
1951–52	1st Division	8	Runner-up
1952–53	1st Division	6	Champion
1953–54	1st Division	3	Quarter-finals
1954–55	1st Division	8	K.O Stage
1955–56	1st Division	13	K.O Stage
1956–1963	no participation	No participation	No participation
1964–65	2nd Division	4	Quarter-finals
1965–66	2nd Division	4	K.O Stage
1966–67	2nd Division	4	K.O Stage
1967–68	2nd Division	5	K.O Stage
1968–69	2nd Division	3	Runner-up
1969–70	2nd Division	9	Runner-up
1970–71	1st Division	11	K.O Stage
1971–72	1st Division	6	Runner-up
1972–73	1st Division	8	not held
1973–74	1st Division	4	not held
1974–75	1st Division	9	not held
1975–76	1st Division	18	not held
1976–77	1st Division	10	not held
1977–78	1st Division	18	not held
1978–79	1st Division	7	not held
1979–80	1st Division	13	not held
1980–81	1st Division	11	not held
1981–82	1st Division	8	not held
1982–83	1st Division	Champion	not held
1983–84	1st Division	13	not held
1984–85	1st Division	10	not held
Mexico 86	1st Division	1	not held
Prode 85	1st Division	2	not held
1986–87	1st Division	6	not held
1987–88	1st Division	10	Champion
1988–89	1st Division	1	K.O Stage
1989–90	1st Division	Champion	Champion
1990–91	1st Division	Semi-finals	K.O Stage
1991–92	1st Division	Final	Quarter-finals
1992–93	1st Division	9	not held
1993–94	1st Division	14	not held
1994–95	1st Division	Quarter-finals	no participation
1995–96	1st Division	18	K.O Stage

Season	Division	Place	Cup
Invierno 96	1st Division	Semi-finals	not held
Verano 97	1st Division	13	not held
Invierno 97	1st Division	13	not held
Verano 98	1st Division	Round of 16	not held
Invierno 98	1st Division	18	not held
Verano 99	1st Division	Relegated	not held
Invierno 99	1st Division	12	not held
Verano 00	1st Division	Quarter-finals	not held
Invierno 00	1st Division	16	not held
Verano 01	1st Division	Semi-finals	not held
Invierno 01	1st Division	10	not held
Verano 02	1st Division	18	not held
Apertura 02	1st Division	16	not held
Clausura 03	1st Division	19	not held
Apertura 03	1st Division	15	not held
Clausura 04	1st Division	16	not held
Apertura 04	1st Division	12	not held
Clausura 05	1st Division	Relegated	not held
Apertura 05	Primera A	Champion	not held
Clausura 06	Primera A	20	not held
Apertura 06	Primera A	Champion	not held
Clausura 07	Primera A	Promoted	not held
Apertura 07	1st Division	14	Not Held
Clausura 08	1st Division	11	Not Held
Apertura 08	1st Division	18	Not Held
Clausura 09	1st Division	Semi-finals	Not Held
Apertura 09	1st Division	Quarter-finals	Not Held
Bicentenario 10	1st Division	13	Not Held
Apertura 10	1st Division	13	Not Held
Clausura 11	1st Division	14	Not Held
Apertura 11	1st Division	12	Not Held
Clausura 12	1st Division	12	Not Held
Apertura 12	1st Division	16	K.O Stage
Clausura 13	1st Division	12	Semi-finals
Apertura 13	1st Division	13	K.O Stage
Clausura 14	1st Division	16	K.O Stage
Apertura 14	1st Division	15	Runner-up
Clausura 15	1st Division	14	Champion
Apertura 15	1st Division	Quarter-finals	K.O Stage
Clausura 16	1st Division	12	*Copa Libertadores
Apertura 16	1st Division	12	K.O Stage
Clausura 17	1st Division	18	Semi-finals
Apertura 17	1st Division	15	K.O Stage
Clausura 18	1st Division	10	K.O Stage
Apertura 18	1st Division	12	Round of 16
Clausura 19	1st Division	10	Quarter-finals
Apertura 19	1st Division	18	Group stage

Season	Division	Place	Cup
Clausura 20	1st Division	10	Group stage
Guardianes 20	1st Division	Quarter-finals	Group stage
Guardianes 21	1st Division	Semi-finals	Not Held
Grita Mexico 21	1st Division	Quarter-finals	Not Held
Grita Mexico 22	1st Division	Quarter-finals	Not Held
Apertura 22	1st Division	Quarter-finals	Not Held
Clausura 23	1st Division	Round of 16	Not Held
Apertura 23	1st Division	Quarter-finals	Not Held
Clausura 24	1st Division	18	Not Held

- During the Clausura 2016, Puebla did not play the Domestic Copa MX instead played the Copa Libertadores .

=== Return of Copa México 2012 ===
Season	Pyramid Level	Apertura Pts	Playoffs 1	Clausura Pts	Playoffs 2	A. Cup 2012	CONCACAF	C. Cup 2013
2012–13	1st Division	13	Did not qualify	12	Did not qualify	Group stage	Did not qualify	Semifinals

Overall Record

Tournament	GP	W	D	L	GS	GA	DIF	PTS	Cups
Mexican Primera División	1708	586	503	619	2368	2436	−68	1778	2
Segunda División de México	192	92	51	47	322	199	+123	239	0
Copa México	136	55	39	42	233	201'	+32	152	5
Supercopa MX	1	1	0	0	1	0	+1	3	1
Primera A	72	33	17	22	117	87	+30	114	2
CONCACAF Champions League	6	3	1	2	8	3	+5	7	1
InterLiga	4	2	0	2	9	6	+3	6	0
Campeón de Campeones	3	0	0	3	2	9	−7	n\a	1
North American SuperLiga	3	2	0	1	5	3	+2	6	0
Copa Interamericana	2	0	0	2	2	7	−5	n\a	0
Leagues Cup	2	0	1	1	1	5	−4	1	0

- Has Played 6 2nd Division Tournaments last in 1969.
- Has Played 4 Primera A Tournaments last in 2007.
- Has Played 65 Mexican Primera División Tournaments last in 2011.

== Player records ==
Since the 1950s, when Ricardo Alvarez scored his 86th and last goal with the club, no one else has accomplished this feat. It was on 21 May 1959 when Alvarez scored his last goals with Puebla before leaving the club to join Veracruz. Ricardo Alvarez left a record of 86 goals in 125 games through a career that spanned 5 years. Half a century later, the name of "La Changa" Alvarez is still the best goal scorer ever in the history of Puebla FC in first division. Even with the club's constancy in first division, playing a total of 54 championships, no other player has reached Alvarez's number of goals scored and only one player has obtained the league goal scoring title in 1996.

It was the Spanish Carlos Muñoz who gave Puebla FC their only one goal scoring title in 1996 with 15 goals. Thanks to 4 good tournaments, Carlos Muñoz placed himself in the list of the best goal scorers in the club's history but still far from the 86 scored by Ricardo Alvarez. Two players were close to beat Alvarez's record: Silvio Fogel in The 1970s and Carlos Poblete in the 1980s. Silvio Fogel scored 84 goals and now is the scoring runner-up in Puebla's history. Carlos Poblete scored 83 and now is third place in the all-time scoring list. Carlos Poblete is at the top of the list in goals scored in playoffs with 15 goals scored. Carlos Poblete and Silvio scored over 100 goals each one, but this was done playing with different clubs. And Ricardo Alvarez did the same scoring 113 goals in his career playing for Puebla FC, Moctezuma, and Veracruz.

=== Goalscorers ===
Position	Player	Goals	Years
*1	Ricardo Álvarez	87	1945–50
*2	Silvio Fogel	84	1975–83
*3	Carlos Poblete	83	1986–96
*4	Álvaro González	75	2006–10
*5	Jorge Aravena	66	1988–91
*6	Guadalupe Velásquez	61	1943–49
*7	Matias Alustiza	64	2012-16
*8	Muricy Ramalho	57	1979–85
*9	Paul Rene Moreno	45	1982-89
*10	Carlos Muñoz	33	1996–98

=== Top goalscorers ===
Year	Player	Goals	Tournament
1944–45	Ricardo Álvarez	15	Copa México
1952–53	Edwin Cubero	10	Copa México
1972–73	Rafael Borja	5	Copa México
1987–88	Daniel Bartolotta	5	Copa México
1987–88	Jorge Aravena	5	Copa México
Invierno 1996	Carlos Muñoz	15	Primera División
Apertura 2006	Álvaro González	19	Primera A
Clausura 2007	Álvaro González	22	Primera A
Clausura 2010	(United States) Herculez Gomez	10	Primera División

== Personnel ==
=== Management ===
Position	Staff
President	(Mexico) Manuel Jiménez García
General Director	(Mexico) Gabriel Saucedo Torres
Director of football	(Mexico) Rafael García
Director of academy	(Spain) Albert Espigares

Source: Liga MX

=== Coaching staff ===
Position	Staff
Manager	(Mexico) Gerardo Espinoza
Assistant managers	(Mexico) José Canales (Mexico) Juan Antonio Torres
Goalkeeper coach	(Mexico) Alan Cruz
Fitness coach	(Argentina) Gustavo Leombruno
Physiotherapist	(Mexico) Jesús Romero
Team doctor	(Mexico) Arturo Alcalde

== Players ==
=== First-team squad ===
As of 10 October 2026

Note: Flags indicate national team as defined under FIFA eligibility rules; some limited exceptions apply. Players may hold more than one non-FIFA nationality.

No.	Pos.	Nation	Player
2	DF	MEX	Ángel Leyva
3	MF	MEX	Alberto Herrera
4	DF	CRC	Juan Pablo Vargas
5	DF	ARG	Facundo Almada
6	DF	MEX	Jair Díaz
7	MF	MEX	Fernando Monárrez (on loan from Tijuana)
8	MF	MEX	Omar Moreno
9	FW	VEN	Luifer Hernández
10	MF	URU	Mathías Tomás
12	DF	MEX	Iker Moreno (on loan from Atlético San Luis)
13	DF	MEX	Eduardo Navarro
14	MF	MEX	Eduardo Armenta
15	DF	MEX	Óscar Villa
16	MF	MEX	Alonso Ramírez

No.	Pos.	Nation	Player
17	MF	MEX	Raúl Castillo
19	FW	ARG	Ignacio Maestro (on loan from Independiente)
20	DF	MEX	Rodrigo Pachuca
21	MF	PAR	Sergio Sanabria
22	MF	MEX	Carlos Baltazar
24	MF	MEX	Alejandro Organista
25	MF	MEX	Heriberto Jurado (on loan from Cercle Brugge)
26	MF	COL	Kevin Velasco
27	MF	MEX	Brayan Garnica
28	GK	MEX	Ricardo Gutiérrez
29	FW	MEX	Eduardo Mustre
33	GK	MEX	Jesús Rodríguez
34	MF	BRA	Lucas Camilo

=== Youth squad ===
Note: Flags indicate national team as defined under FIFA eligibility rules; some limited exceptions apply. Players may hold more than one non-FIFA nationality.

No.	Pos.	Nation	Player
195	DF	MEX	Álvaro de la Rosa

=== Out on loan ===
Note: Flags indicate national team as defined under FIFA eligibility rules; some limited exceptions apply. Players may hold more than one non-FIFA nationality.

No.	Pos.	Nation	Player
—	DF	URU	Emanuel Gularte (at Sporting de Gijón)
—	MF	USA	Fernando Arce Jr. (at Toluca)

No.	Pos.	Nation	Player
—	MF	MEX	Ángel Robles (at Atlético La Paz)

== Managers ==
- (Spain) Isidro Lángara (1952–54)
- (Brazil) Carlito Peters (1977)
- (Uruguay) Juan Ricardo Faccio (1977–78)
- (Mexico) Manuel Lapuente (1978–84)
- (Uruguay) Hugo Fernández (1985–87)
- (Chile) Pedro García Barros (1988–89)
- (Mexico) Manuel Lapuente (1988–93)
- (Mexico) Ignacio Trelles (1990–91)
- (Brazil) Jorge Vieira (1990–92)
- (Brazil) Muricy Ramalho (1993)
- (Mexico) Alfredo Tena (1993–95)
- (Uruguay) Hugo Fernández (1995–96)
- (Uruguay) Aníbal Ruiz (1996–97)
- (Uruguay) Julio González (1997–98)
- (Mexico) Alfredo Tena (1 January 1999 – 5 April 1999)
- (Spain) José Mari Bakero (1 July 1999 – 27 September 1999)
- (Mexico) Miguel Mejía Barón (2000)
- (Mexico) Mario Carrillo (16 September 2000 – 31 December 2001)
- (Mexico) Tomás Boy (1 January 2002 – 25 March 2002)
- (Mexico) Alejandro Domínguez (interim) (6 April 2002 – 12 April 2002)
- (Mexico) Tomás Boy (interim) (25 April 2002 – 30 June 2002)
- (Mexico) Ignacio Ambríz (1 July 2002 – 30 June 2003)
- (Mexico) Víctor Vucetich (16 September 2002 – 3 March 2003)
- (Uruguay) Hugo Fernández (2003)
- (Mexico) Mario Carrillo (1 July 2003 – 31 December 2003)
- (Argentina) Roberto Saporiti (18 March 2005 – 30 June 2005)
- (Chile) Jorge Aravena (1 July 2005 – 31 December 2005)
- (Argentina) César Luis Menotti (2006)
- (Mexico) José Luis Sánchez (1 July 2006 – 16 September 2008)
- (Mexico) Mario Carrillo (17 September 2008 – 31 December 2008)
- (Mexico) José Luis Sánchez (1 January 2009 – 23 August 2010)
- (Mexico) Eduardo Fentanes (24 August 2010 – 13 September 2010)
- (Mexico) José Luis Trejo (14 September 2010 – 15 February 2011)
- (Uruguay) Héctor Hugo Eugui (15 February 2011 – 30 June 2011)
- (Mexico) Sergio Bueno (1 July 2011 – 31 December 2011)
- (Colombia) Juan Carlos Osorio (1 January 2012 – 21 March 2012)
- (Uruguay) Daniel Bartolotta (21 March 2012 – 18 August 2012)
- (Mexico) Daniel Guzman (20 August 2012 – 30 October 2012)
- (Chile) Carlos Poblete (30 October 2012 – 31 December 2012)
- (Mexico) Manuel Lapuente (1 January 2013 – 14 August 2013)
- (Argentina) Rubén Omar Romano (14 August 2013 – 24 August 2014)
- (Mexico) José Luis Sánchez (25 August 2014, 30 June 2014)
- (Mexico) José Guadalupe Cruz (8 December 2014 – 18 May 2015)
- (Argentina) Pablo Marini (30 May 2015 – 18 April 2016)
- (Argentina) Ricardo Valiño (19 April 2016 – 30 January 2017)
- (Paraguay) José Cardozo (30 January 2017 – 30 July 2017)
- (Mexico) Rafael García (1 August 2017 – 18 October 2017)
- (Mexico) Enrique Meza (20 October 2017 – 3 February 2019)
- (Mexico) José Luis Sánchez (6 February 2019 – 17 August 2019)
- (Peru) Juan Reynoso (25 August 2019 – 5 December 2020)
- (Argentina) Nicolás Larcamón (10 December 2020 – 9 November 2022)
- (Mexico) Eduardo Arce (18 November 2022 – 24 August 2023)
- (Mexico) Ricardo Carbajal (25 August 2023 – 24 February 2024)
- (Venezuela) Fernando Aristeguieta (Interim) (25 February 2024 – 11 March 2024)
- (Argentina) Andrés Carevic (12 March 2024 – 8 May 2024)
- (Mexico) José Manuel de la Torre (22 May 2024 – 15 November 2024)
- (Argentina) Pablo Guede (2 December 2024 – 16 August 2025)
- (Argentina) Hernán Cristante (22 August 2025 – 12 November 2025)
- (Spain) Albert Espigares (20 November 2025 – 4 May 2026)
