= 1989–90 Copa México =

Tournament details
- Country: Mexico
- Teams: 20

Final positions
- Champions: Puebla (4th title)
- Runners-up: Tigres UANL

Tournament statistics
- Matches played: 23
- Goals scored: 91 (3.96 per match)

The 1989–90 Copa México was the 62nd staging of the Copa México, the 35th staging in the professional era.

The competition started on January 17, 1990, and concluded on April 18, 1990, with the final, held at the Estadio Cuauhtémoc in Puebla City, in which Puebla lifted the trophy for the fourth time ever with a 4–3 victory over Tigres UANL.

For this edition the teams were seeded 1–20 based on points at the end of the round 19 in the 1989–90 league:

Seeding
Seed	Team	seed	team
1	Puebla	11	Irapuato
2	América	12	Cobras
3	U. de G.	13	Santos Laguna
4	UNAM	14	Tecos
5	Necaxa	15	Correcaminos
6	Morelia	16	Toluca
7	Monterrey	17	Atlante F.C.
8	Tigres UANL	18	Guadalajara
9	Cruz Azul	19	Veracruz
10	Atlas	20	Tampico Madero

== Preliminary round ==
Preliminary; From January 17 to January 31					Qualifiers
20	Tampico Madero (a)	1	1	2
13	Santos Laguna	0	2	2	20	Tampico Madero
14	Tecos	2	1	3	14	Tecos
19	Veracruz	0	0	0

Preliminary; From January 17 to January 31					Qualifiers
18	Guadalajara	2	1	3
15	Correcaminos	0	1	1	18	Guadalajara
17	Atlante F.C.	1	1	2	16	Toluca
16	Toluca	1	2	3

== Knock-out rounds ==
Round of 16; From February 13 to March 1st
18	Guadalajara	4	0	4
3	U. de G.	2	1	3
20	Tampico Madero	1	2	3
1	Puebla	0	4	4
7	Monterrey	3	0	3
9	Cruz Azul	2	0	2
5	Necaxa	3	0	3
11	Irapuato	0	0	0
16	Toluca	0	0	0
2	América	3	0	0
14	Tecos	4	4	5
4	UNAM	1	2	3
12	Cobras	2	2	4
6	Morelia	0	2	2
10	Atlas	3	0	3
8	Tigres UANL	2	2	4

Quarter-finals; From March 7 to March 14
18	Guadalajara	0	1	1
1	Puebla	0	2	2
7	Monterrey	2	1	3
5	Necaxa	1	0	1
2	América (a)	1	0	1
14	Tecos	1	0	1
12	Cobras	2	1	3
8	Tigres UANL	1	3	4

Semi-finals; From March 21 to April 4
1	Puebla	1	1	2
7	Monterrey	1	0	1
2	América	1	2	3
8	Tigres UANL (a)	1	2	3

Finals; April 11 and April 18
1	Puebla	0	4	4
8	Tigres UANL	2	1	3

== Semifinals ==
=== First leg ===
March 21

Monterrey	1–1	Puebla
Francisco Javier Cruz 69'		Sergio Almaguer 54'

Estadio Tecnológico, Monterrey

March 28

Tigres UANL	1–1	América
Sergio Almirón 84' (pen.)		Jesús Eduardo Córdova 91'

Estadio Universitario, San Nicolás de los Garza

=== Second leg ===
March 28

Puebla	1–0	Monterrey
Jorge Aravena 24'

Estadio Cuauhtémoc, Puebla City

Puebla F.C. go to the final 2–1 on aggregate

April 4

América	2–2	Tigres UANL
Raúl Vicente Amarilla 15'; Gonzalo Farfán 71'		Sergio Almirón 47' (pen.); Miguel Ángel Esparza 73'

Estadio Azteca, Mexico DF

Puebla F.C. go to the final 2–1 on aggregate on away goals

== Finals ==
=== First leg ===
April 11

Tigres UANL	2–0	Puebla
Sergio Almirón 28'; Jorge Gama 33'

Estadio Universitario, San Nicolás de los Garza

=== Second leg ===
Jun 8

Puebla	4–1	Tigres UANL
Carlos Poblete 3', 20'; Jorge Aravena 39'; Marcelino Bernal 83'		Sergio Almirón 36'

Estadio Cuauhtémoc, Puebla City

Puebla won the Cup 4-3 on aggregate

Copa México 1989-90 Winners
Puebla
4th Title
