= Hugo Fernández (footballer) =

Uruguayan footballer and manager (1945–2022)

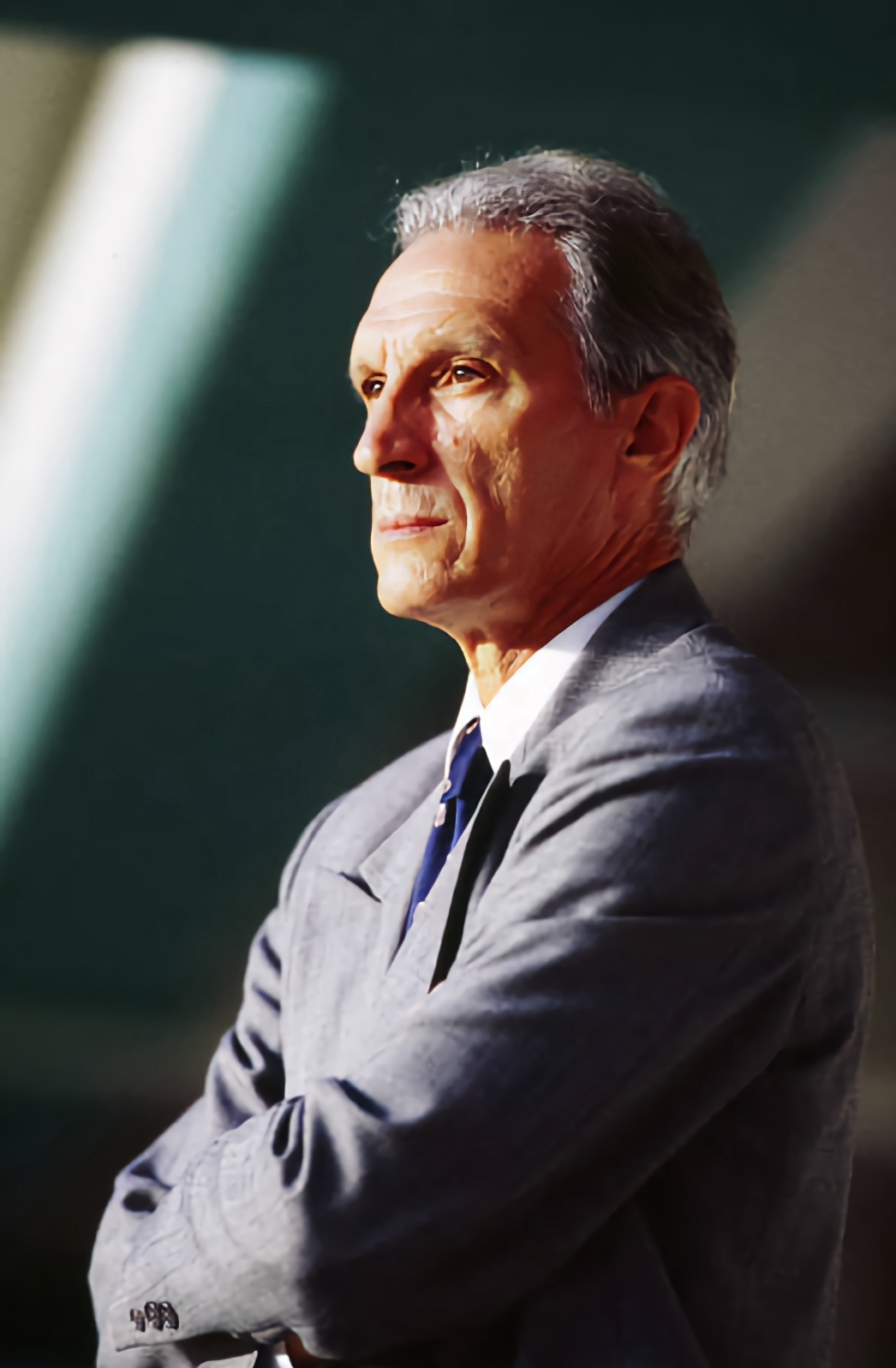

Personal information
- Full name: Hugo Daniel Fernández Vallejo
- Date of birth: 2 February 1945
- Place of birth: Montevideo, Uruguay
- Date of death: 1 August 2022 (aged 77)
- Place of death: Puebla de Zaragoza, Mexico
- Position: Defender

Senior career*
Years	Team	Apps	(Gls)
1961–1966	Nacional		
1967	Racing Montevideo		
1968–1969	Gimnasia LP	7	(0)
1970	Cerro		
1971	Defensor		
1972–1975	Peñarol		
1975–1978	Tenerife		
1979–1980	Puebla	74	(7)
1980–1981	Peñarol		
1981	Atlas	3	(0)

Managerial career
- 1984: Peñarol
- 1985–1987: Puebla
- 1988–1989: Tigres
- 1989–1990: Tampico Madero
- 1994–1995: Nacional
- 1995–1996: Puebla
- 1997–1998: Consadole Sapporo
- 2001: Irapuato
- 2002: Veracruz
- 2003: Puebla
- 2006: Lobos BUAP
- 2006–2008: Dorados de Sinaloa
- * Club domestic league appearances and goals

Hugo Daniel Fernández Vallejo (2 February 1945 – 1 August 2022) was a Uruguayan football player and manager.

Fernández played professional football in Puebla F.C. in 1979, before returning home with CA Peñarol.

After he retired from playing, Fernández became a football coach. He has managed former club, Puebla, on three occasions. He has also managed Consadole Sapporo in Japan.

== Managerial statistics ==
Team	From	To	Record				
Team	From	To	G	W	D	L	Win %
Consadole Sapporo	1998	1998	28	9	0	19	32.14
Total			28	9	0	19	32.14
