= José Velázquez =

Mexican footballer (1923–2012)

Personal information
- Full name: José Guadalupe Velázquez Alarcón
- Date of birth: August 12, 1923
- Place of birth: Jalisco, Mexico
- Date of death: 2012 (aged 88–89)
- Height: 1.62 m (5 ft 4 in)
- Position: Striker

Senior career*
| Years | Team | Apps | (Gls) |
| 1945–1950 | Puebla | | (61) |
| 1951 | Veracruz | | |

International career
| 1950 | Mexico | 5 | (0) |
- * Club domestic league appearances and goals

José Guadalupe Velázquez Alarcón (August 12, 1923 – 2012) was a Mexican footballer who competed primarily in the México Primera División. He spent most of his career with Puebla F.C., for whom he scored 61 goals, and was a member of the 1944 Copa México championship team. Velázquez represented his national team on one occasion in the 1950 FIFA World Cup held in Brazil.

== Personal life ==
Velázquez was born in Jalisco, Mexico.

== Career ==
Velázquez made his professional debut with Puebla F.C. in 1944, the club's first year in existence, and played in the Primera División league championship match against Real Club España later that year. Velázquez was his club's top scorer with 13 goals. Puebla F.C. finished the championship series as runner-up. Velázquez then became a key player in the club's victory at that year's Copa México cup against Club América.

In 1951, at the completion of his contract with Puebla F.C., Velázquez moved to Deportivo Veracruz, where he played for a year before retiring.

== National team ==
Together with Puebla F.C. team-mate, Samuel Canno, Velázquez was required to play in the 1950 FIFA World Cup in Brazil. He was selected as captain and played in all three of the scheduled matches, but failed to score.

| Year | Club | Goals |
|---|---|---|
| 1944-45 | Puebla F.C. | 13 |
| 1945-46 | Puebla F.C. | ? |
| 1946-47 | Puebla F.C. | ? |
| 1947-48 | Puebla F.C. | ? |
| 1948-49 | Puebla F.C. | 13 |
| 1949-50 | Puebla F.C. | ? |
| 1950-51 | Deportivo Veracruz | ? |

== Honors ==
- Copa México: (1) 1945
