= 1989–90 Mexican Primera División season =

48th professional season of the top-flight football league in Mexico

Primera División de México
- Season: 1989–90
- Champions: Puebla (2nd title)
- Relegated: Atlante
- Champions' Cup: Puebla; UdeG
- CONCACAF Cup Winners Cup: UdeG
- Matches: 394
- Goals: 966 (2.45 per match)

Statistics of Primera División de México in season 1989–90.

== Overview ==
It was contested by 20 teams, and Puebla won the championship.

Potros Neza was promoted from Segunda División, however, the team sold its license to Veracruz.

Atlante F.C. was relocated from Mexico City to Querétaro. The same team was relegated to Segunda División.

=== Teams ===
Location of the 1989-90 Primera División teams

Team	City	Stadium
América	Mexico City	Azteca
Atlante	Querétaro, Querétaro	Corregidora
Atlas	Guadalajara, Jalisco	Jalisco
Cobras	Ciudad Juárez, Chihuahua	Olímpico Benito Juárez
Cruz Azul	Mexico City	Azteca
Guadalajara	Guadalajara, Jalisco	Jalisco
Irapuato	Irapuato, Guanajuato	Irapuato
Morelia	Morelia, Michoacán	Morelos
Monterrey	Monterrey, Nuevo León	Tecnológico
Necaxa	Mexico City	Azteca
Puebla	Puebla, Puebla	Cuauhtémoc
Santos Laguna	Torreón, Coahuila	Estadio Corona
Tampico Madero	Tampico-Madero, Tamaulipas	Tamaulipas
Tecos	Zapopan, Jalisco	Tres de Marzo
Toluca	Toluca, State of Mexico	Toluca 70-86
UANL	Monterrey, Nuevo León	Universitario
UAT	Ciudad Victoria, Tamaulipas	Estadio Marte R. Gómez
UdeG	Guadalajara, Jalisco	Jalisco
UNAM	Mexico City	Olímpico Universitario
Veracruz	Veracruz, Veracruz	Luis "Pirata" Fuente

== Group stage ==
=== Group 1 ===
Pos	Team	Pld	W	D	L	GF	GA	GD	Pts	Qualification
1	UNAM	38	15	16	7	59	38	+21	46	Playoff
2	Puebla	38	17	12	9	57	42	+15	46	Playoff
3	Monterrey	38	15	12	11	57	51	+6	42	
4	Morelia	38	14	11	13	44	42	+2	39	
5	Irapuato	38	10	17	11	38	42	−4	37	

=== Group 2 ===
Pos	Team	Pld	W	D	L	GF	GA	GD	Pts	Qualification or relegation
1	UdeG	38	14	12	12	47	45	+2	40	Playoff
2	Toluca	38	11	16	11	42	33	+9	38	Playoff
3	Santos	38	11	12	15	38	49	−11	34	
4	Cruz Azul	38	8	17	13	47	62	−15	33	
5	Atlante	38	9	10	19	36	50	−14	28	Relegated

=== Group 3 ===
Pos	Team	Pld	W	D	L	GF	GA	GD	Pts	Qualification
1	América	38	16	16	6	70	45	+25	48	Playoff
2	Correcaminos	38	14	12	12	34	36	−2	40	Playoff
3	Atlas	38	10	17	11	32	29	+3	37	
4	Tecos	38	9	16	13	45	53	−8	34	
5	Tampico Madero	38	9	11	18	29	48	−19	29	

=== Group 4 ===
Pos	Team	Pld	W	D	L	GF	GA	GD	Pts	Qualification
1	UANL	38	14	12	12	62	64	−2	40	Playoff
2	Necaxa	38	11	17	10	38	34	+4	39	Playoff
3	Guadalajara	38	10	18	10	41	42	−1	38	
4	Cobras	38	12	14	12	43	48	−5	38	
5	Veracruz	38	11	12	15	53	59	−6	34	

== Results ==
Home \ Away	AME	ATE	ATS	COB	CAZ	GDL	IRA	MOR	MTY	NEC	PUE	SAN	TAM	TEC	TOL	UNL	UAT	UDG	UNM	VER
América	—	1–0	1–0	4–0	2–0	2–2	1–1	1–0	1–3	2–2	2–2	4–0	1–0	4–0	1–0	4–1	1–0	2–2	3–3	5–3
Atlante	0–1	—	1–2	1–0	1–1	2–1	1–1	0–1	3–1	0–1	0–2	1–1	1–0	1–1	1–3	1–2	2–2	2–1	0–1	6–3
Atlas	2–2	0–0	—	2–2	1–1	1–1	1–0	2–0	1–1	0–0	1–1	1–1	2–0	2–0	0–2	2–1	3–0	0–1	1–2	1–1
Cobras	1–1	0–0	1–0	—	1–1	0–0	3–2	0–2	3–2	2–0	1–2	0–1	2–1	3–0	1–1	1–0	1–2	2–1	1–1	1–0
Cruz Azul	0–3	1–2	0–3	1–1	—	0–0	2–1	0–2	2–4	0–0	2–1	2–3	3–0	1–1	1–1	2–0	1–3	1–1	0–4	2–2
Guadalajara	2–2	1–0	1–2	3–1	1–1	—	0–0	0–1	1–2	0–1	0–1	2–1	0–0	1–1	0–0	2–1	0–0	1–0	2–1	1–1
Irapuato	1–2	3–1	0–0	2–0	0–0	1–4	—	1–1	1–1	1–0	2–1	1–0	2–0	1–1	0–3	0–0	3–0	0–0	1–1	3–3
Morelia	1–1	1–1	0–0	0–1	1–1	1–1	0–1	—	4–0	1–3	1–2	2–1	1–1	2–0	3–2	3–0	1–1	1–1	1–2	3–1
Monterrey	1–4	1–0	1–0	0–0	3–3	2–0	2–1	3–0	—	1–1	2–3	4–0	4–1	0–0	1–1	0–1	2–0	2–2	1–0	2–1
Necaxa	1–0	0–1	1–0	2–2	2–1	0–0	0–1	1–2	2–2	—	1–1	3–1	1–1	0–0	1–0	3–3	0–1	1–1	0–0	2–0
Puebla	2–2	1–1	1–0	0–2	4–2	0–0	3–0	4–1	1–2	2–1	—	1–3	3–0	2–1	1–2	2–1	0–0	0–0	0–2	3–1
Santos	2–1	2–1	0–0	0–0	0–0	2–2	2–0	1–1	2–2	2–1	2–1	—	2–0	1–2	0–0	0–0	1–1	1–0	1–0	1–1
Tampico Madero	2–0	1–0	1–0	3–2	2–3	1–2	0–0	0–1	1–1	1–0	2–2	2–0	—	1–0	1–0	1–2	0–1	1–1	0–0	1–0
Tecos	1–1	2–1	0–1	1–1	3–3	1–1	4–1	0–0	4–2	0–1	1–2	2–1	1–1	—	0–0	4–3	2–0	1–0	1–1	2–0
Toluca	0–0	1–2	0–0	0–0	2–0	1–2	2–2	1–0	0–0	0–0	0–1	2–0	3–0	1–1	—	4–1	1–0	3–1	3–3	0–0
UANL	2–2	5–1	0–0	4–2	1–2	4–4	1–0	3–1	0–2	2–2	2–2	1–0	1–1	4–3	2–1	—	2–0	2–1	1–1	1–4
UAT	2–1	2–0	0–0	2–1	1–1	1–0	0–0	2–0	1–0	1–1	0–0	1–0	1–0	2–0	2–1	1–2	—	1–1	0–0	1–3
UdeG	3–2	1–0	0–0	3–0	1–3	2–1	0–2	0–1	1–0	2–1	0–2	2–1	3–1	3–2	2–0	2–2	2–1	—	3–2	1–2
UNAM	1–1	1–0	3–0	2–3	4–1	4–0	2–2	1–0	1–0	0–2	1–1	2–1	0–0	1–1	1–1	2–2	2–1	1–2	—	2–0
Veracruz	2–2	1–1	2–1	1–1	0–2	1–2	0–0	2–3	4–0	0–0	1–0	3–1	2–1	3–1	2–0	1–2	1–0	0–0	1–4	—

Updated to match(es) played on 6 May 1990. Source: RSSSF
Legend: Blue = home team win; Yellow = draw; Red = away team win.

== Playoff ==
Quarter-finals
2	UNAM	0	3	3
9	Necaxa	0	1	1
3	Puebla	1	3	4
7	UAT	3	1	4
1	América	1	3	4
10	Toluca	1	0	1
5	U. de G	2	3	5
6	UANL	3	1	4

Semi-finals
2	UNAM	4	2	6
3	Puebla	4	4	8
1	América	0	2	2
5	U. de G.	1	2	3

Final
3	Puebla	2	4	6
5	U. de G.	1	3	4

=== Final ===
May 23, 1990

U. de G.	1-2	Puebla
Octavio Mora 33'	Report	Jorge Aravena 39'; Carlos Poblete 62'

Estadio Jalisco, Guadalajara
May 26, 1990

Puebla	4-3	U. de G.
Javier Hernández 33'; Jorge Aravena 39', 72'; Carlos Poblete 83'	Report	Roberto Ruiz Esparza 25' (o.g.); Daniel Guzmán 32'; Jorge Dávalos 85'

Estadio Cuauhtémoc, Puebla

Puebla won 6-4 on aggregate.

1989-90 winners

2nd title

== Moves ==
After this season Querétaro bought the Tampico Madero franchise in order to come into Primera Division for the 1990-91 season.
