= 1963 CONCACAF Championship squads =

These are the squads for the countries that played in the 1963 CONCACAF Championship.

The age listed for each player is on 23 March 1963, the first day of the tournament. The numbers of caps and goals listed for each player do not include any matches played after the start of the tournament. The club listed is the club for which the player last played a competitive match before the tournament. The nationality for each club reflects the national association (not the league) to which the club is affiliated. A flag is included for coaches who are of a different nationality than their own national team.

== Group A ==
=== El Salvador ===
Head Coach: Luis Comitante

No.	Pos.	Player	Date of birth (age)	Caps	Club
1	GK	Raúl Magaña	24 February 1940 (aged 23)		(El Salvador) Atlético Marte
2	GK	Mario Esteban Medina	26 November 1936 (aged 26)		(El Salvador) FAS
3	GK	Oscar Armando Herrera			(El Salvador) Atlante San Alejo
4	GK	Francisco Francés	8 July 1938 (aged 24)		(El Salvador) Santa Anita
5	DF	Guillermo Castro	25 June 1940 (aged 22)		(El Salvador) Atlético Marte
6	DF	Héctor Núñez Argueta			(El Salvador) Atlante San Alejo
7	DF	César Reynosa			(El Salvador) FAS
8	DF	Rodolfo Fuentes			(El Salvador) Águila
9	DF	Roberto Francisco Hernández			(El Salvador) Atlante San Alejo
10	DF	Edgar Nolasco			(El Salvador) Atlante San Alejo
11	DF	Benjamín Velasco			(El Salvador) Atlante San Alejo
12	DF	René Mauricio Cuéllar			(El Salvador) Atlante San Alejo
13	MF	Mario Monge	27 November 1938 (aged 24)		(El Salvador) FAS
14	MF	Mauricio González	13 May 1942 (aged 20)		(El Salvador) Atlético Marte
15	MF	Manuel Duke			(El Salvador) Atlante San Alejo
16	MF	Armando Chacón Salazar	9 May 1941 (aged 21)		(El Salvador) FAS
17	FW	Pipo Rodríguez	12 September 1941 (aged 21)		(El Salvador) FAS
18	FW	Alfredo Ruano	14 October 1932 (aged 30)		(El Salvador) Atlante San Alejo
19	FW	Maximiliano Cubas	16 October 1934 (aged 28)		(El Salvador) FAS
20	FW	Rodolfo Artiga Ruiz	22 December 1934 (aged 28)		(El Salvador) Atlante San Alejo
21	FW	Eduardo Hernández			(El Salvador) Atlante San Alejo
22	FW	Salvador Rocabruna			(El Salvador) Águila
23	FW	Fernando Antonio Villalobos			(El Salvador) Atlante San Alejo

=== Guatemala ===
Head Coach: Lorenzo Ausina Tur

No.	Pos.	Player	Date of birth (age)	Caps	Club
1	GK	Guillermo Gamboa	6 April 1936 (aged 26)		(Guatemala) Comunicaciones
2	GK	Ignacio González Lam	2 April 1944 (aged 18)		(Guatemala) Municipal
3	GK	Héctor Bolaños			(Guatemala) Municipal
4	DF	Roberto Zúñiga García			(Guatemala) Comunicaciones
5	DF	José Antonio García	5 July 1940 (aged 22)		(Guatemala) Aurora
6	DF	Enrique Wellmann	21 April 1931 (aged 31)		(Guatemala) Comunicaciones
7	DF	Mario Ortega López			(Guatemala) Comunicaciones
8	DF	Rafael Maldonado			(Guatemala) Aurora
9	MF	Francisco López Contreras	17 September 1934 (aged 28)		(Guatemala) Comunicaciones
10	MF	Jorge Roldán	16 December 1940 (aged 22)		(Guatemala) Aurora
11	MF	Ricardo Clark	27 November 1937 (aged 25)		(Guatemala) Municipal
12	MF	Eduardo de León	30 October 1933 (aged 29)		(Guatemala) Tipografía Nacional
13	MF	Rolando Valdez	22 May 1945 (aged 17)		(Guatemala) Municipal
14	MF	Tony Ewing			(Guatemala) Municipal
15	MF	Alberto López Sánchez	3 October 1944 (aged 18)		(Guatemala) Municipal
16	MF	Hugo Filippi			(Guatemala) Free agent
17	MF	Alberto Cazzalli			(Guatemala) Aurora
18	FW	Hugo Peña	6 May 1936 (aged 26)		(Guatemala) Comunicaciones
19	FW	Daniel Salamanca Posadas	20 January 1939 (aged 24)		(Guatemala) USAC
20	FW	Haroldo Juárez	1940 (aged 22–23)		(Guatemala) Xelajú
21	FW	Armando Mazariegos	6 April 1936 (aged 26)		(Guatemala) Municipal
22	FW	Rolando Quiñonez			(Guatemala) Escuintla
23	FW	Jaime García			(Guatemala) Tipografía Nacional

=== Honduras ===
Head Coach: Carlos Padilla Velásquez

No.	Pos.	Player	Date of birth (age)	Caps	Club
1	GK	Arnold Chessman	24 December 1941 (aged 21)		(Honduras) Olimpia
2	GK	José León Najarro			(Honduras) Atlético Independiente
3	GK	Ricardo Cárdenas	1940 (aged 22–23)		(Honduras) Troya
4	DF	Jorge Alberto Solís	1 January 1935 (aged 28)		(Honduras) Olimpia
5	DF	Federico Budde	9 December 1942 (aged 20)		(Honduras) Olimpia
6	DF	Reynaldo Centeno	24 January 1936 (aged 27)		(Honduras) Olimpia
7	DF	Roberto Güity	27 March 1934 (aged 28)		(Honduras) Atlético Indio
8	DF	Nilmo Edwards			(Honduras) Vida
9	DF	Marco Antonio Rosales	1938		(Honduras) Olimpia
10	MF	Carlos Suazo	8 March 1936 (aged 27)		(Honduras) Olimpia
11	MF	Ricardo Taylor	3 October 1941 (aged 21)		(Honduras) Olimpia
12	MF	Víctor Ramos			(Honduras) UNAH
13	MF	Felipe Barahona			(Honduras) Olimpia
14	MF	Domingo Ramos			Honduras Progreso
15	MF	Ramón Oviedo			(Honduras) Real España
16	FW	Raúl Suazo	19 September 1944 (aged 18)		(Honduras) Olimpia
17	FW	Donaldo Rosales	3 March 1939 (aged 24)		(Honduras) Olimpia
18	FW	Félix Guerra Dolores			(Honduras) Platense
19	FW	Carlos Rodney Velázquez			(Honduras) Troya
20	FW	Lolo Cruz			(Honduras) Real España
21	FW	René Reyes Rodríguez			(Honduras) Olimpia
22	FW	Andrés Ávila			Honduras Progreso
23	FW	Óscar Trejo			(Honduras) Atlético Independiente

=== Nicaragua ===
Coach: Francisc Mészáros

No.	Pos.	Player	Date of birth (age)	Caps	Club
1	GK	Roger Mayorga	10 July 1946 (aged 16)		(Nicaragua) Dinamo
2	GK	Roger Páez			(Nicaragua) Diriangén
3	GK	Gilberto López			(Nicaragua)
4	DF	Miguel Buitrago	7 April 1941 (aged 21)		(Nicaragua) Santa Cecilia
5	DF	Ramiro Contreras			(Nicaragua)
6	DF	Vladimir Tapia			(Nicaragua) Diriangén
7	DF	Omar Jirón			(Nicaragua)
8	DF	Chester Guerrero			(Nicaragua)
9	DF	Eddy Bernard			(Nicaragua)
10	MF	Bayardo Gutiérrez			(Nicaragua)
11	MF	Juan Carlos Pacheco			(Nicaragua)
12	MF	Luis Alberto Dávila			(Nicaragua)
13	MF	Eddie Martínez			(Nicaragua)
14	FW	Dámaso Silva	7 December 1937 (aged 25)		(Nicaragua) Santa Cecilia
15	FW	Armando Mendieta	6 June 1941 (aged 21)		(Nicaragua)
16	FW	Carlos González			(Nicaragua)
17	FW	Roger Silva			(Nicaragua)
18	FW	Emilio Gutiérrez Aguirre			(Nicaragua)
19	FW	Rolando Molina			(Nicaragua)

=== Panama ===
Head coach: Raúl Álvarez

No.	Pos.	Player	Date of birth (age)	Caps	Club
1	GK	Roberto Tyrrel	10 April 1936 (aged 26)		(Costa Rica) Alajuelense
2	GK	Luis Alberto Acosta			(Panama)
3	DF	Miguel Davis	2 May 1940 (aged 22)		(Panama) Unión Ibérica
4	DF	Nemesio Zambrano	29 January 1942 (aged 21)		(Panama) Oro
5	DF	Everardo Vega			(Panama)
6	MF	Adolfo Díaz Gáez	20 May 1930 (aged 32)		(Panama) Barraza
7	MF	Luis Alemán Bazán	17 December 1938 (aged 24)		(Panama) Cerveza Balboa
8	MF	Pércival Piggott	16 January 1938 (aged 25)		(Panama) Unión Ibérica
9	MF	Gaspar Romero	14 September 1941 (aged 21)		(Panama) Unión Española
10	MF	Ricuarte Ruiz			(Panama) Plaza Amador
11	FW	Carlos Antonio Valderrama	20 March 1933 (aged 30)		(Panama) La Garantía
12	FW	Luis Ernesto Tapia	21 October 1944 (aged 18)		(Panama) Deportivo El Granillo
13	FW	Guillermo Bounting	21 December 1944 (aged 18)		(Panama) Unión Española
14	FW	Juan Antonio Santamaría	21 April 1938 (aged 24)		(Panama) Unión Española
15	FW	Luis Carlos Ponce	22 August 1932 (aged 30)		(Panama)
16	FW	Cirilo Sánchez	28 March 1939 (aged 23)		(Panama)
17	FW	Luis Goyes			(Panama)
18	FW	Conrado Córdoba			(Panama)
19		Olmedo Acosta			(Panama)
20		Zenobio Ponce			(Panama)
21		Marcos Antonio Valdés			(Panama)

== Group B ==
=== Netherlands Antilles ===
Head coach: Pedro Celestino da Cunha

No.	Pos.	Player	Date of birth (age)	Caps	Club
1	GK	Fritz Meursing			(Netherlands Antilles) Jong Holland
2	GK	Francisco Bernadina			(Netherlands Antilles) Jong Colombia
3	GK	Jubert Richardson	1 January 1942 (aged 21)		(Netherlands Antilles) Dakota
4	DF	Hilario Bertrand			(Netherlands Antilles) Sithoc
5	DF	Juan Maximiliano Pablo	18 November 1938 (aged 24)		(Netherlands Antilles) Dakota
6	DF	Virgilio Constancia			(Netherlands Antilles) Jong Colombia
7	DF	Amador Balentin			(Netherlands Antilles) SUBT
8	MF	Toribio Briezen			(Netherlands Antilles) San Nicolas Juniors
9	MF	Edgar Meulens			(Netherlands Antilles) Jong Holland
10	MF	James Alfonso Richardson			(Netherlands Antilles) Dakota
11	MF	Rudolfo Dirksz			(Netherlands Antilles) Racing Aruba
12	MF	Stanley De Lannoy			(Netherlands Antilles) Veendam
13	MF	Daniel Pablo			(Netherlands Antilles) Dakota
14	MF	Ocando Wernet	2 February 1936 (aged 27)		(Netherlands Antilles) Estrella
15	MF	Franklin Victoria			(Netherlands Antilles) Jong Colombia
16	MF	Pablo Antonio Tromp			(Netherlands Antilles) Scherpenheuvel
17	FW	Ruben Brandborg			(Netherlands Antilles) Jong Holland
18	FW	Hubert Williams			(Netherlands Antilles) Dakota
19	FW	Hubert De Lannoy			(Netherlands Antilles) Dakota
20	FW	Eugene Testing			(Netherlands Antilles) Sithoc
21	FW	George Sillé			(Netherlands Antilles) SUBT
22	FW	Hubert Martina			(Netherlands Antilles) Jong Colombia
23	FW	Rupert Balentien			(Netherlands Antilles) Real Rincon

=== Costa Rica ===
Head coach: Alfredo Piedra

No.	Pos.	Player	Date of birth (age)	Caps	Club
1	GK	Emilio Sagot	26 February 1942 (aged 21)		(Costa Rica) Orión F.C.
2	GK	Mario Pérez Rodríguez	11 April 1936 (aged 26)		(Costa Rica) Saprissa
3	GK	Asdrúbal Meneses	21 June 1936 (aged 26)		(Costa Rica) Cartaginés
4	DF	Mario Cordero	7 April 1930 (aged 32)		(Costa Rica) Saprissa
5	DF	Edgar Zúñiga	16 October 1941 (aged 21)		(Costa Rica) Alajuelense
6	DF	Álvaro Grant	3 February 1938 (aged 25)		(Costa Rica) Herediano
7	DF	Alex Sánchez Cruz	20 July 1930 (aged 32)		(Costa Rica) Alajuelense
8	DF	Giovanni Rodríguez Chavarría	8 January 1936 (aged 27)		(Costa Rica) Saprissa
9	DF	Guillermo Hernández Astorga	11 October 1933 (aged 29)		(Costa Rica) Saprissa
10	MF	Edgar Quesada	16 August 1931 (aged 31)		(Costa Rica) Herediano
11	MF	Juan José Gámez	8 July 1939 (aged 23)		(Costa Rica) Alajuelense
12	MF	Carlos Marín Segura	28 May 1940 (aged 22)		(Costa Rica) Herediano
13	MF	Rodolfo Madriz			(Costa Rica) Cartaginés
14	MF	William Quirós	10 October 1941 (aged 21)		(Costa Rica) Saprissa
15	FW	Enrique Córdoba	1 August 1938 (aged 24)		(Costa Rica) Cartaginés
16	FW	Edgar Marín	22 May 1943 (aged 19)		(Costa Rica) Saprissa
17	FW	Leonel Hernández	3 October 1943 (aged 19)		(Costa Rica) Cartaginés
18	FW	Rubén Jiménez	9 December 1932 (aged 30)		(Costa Rica) Saprissa
19	FW	Walter Pearson Wilson	2 December 1939 (aged 23)		(Costa Rica) Alajuelense
20	FW	Víctor Luis Vázquez	29 March 1939 (aged 23)		(Costa Rica) Saprissa
21	FW	Héctor Coto	22 March 1945 (aged 18)		(Costa Rica) Cartaginés
22	FW	Guillermo Elizondo	28 April 1937 (aged 25)		(Costa Rica) Uruguay de Coronado
23	FW	Juan González Soto	27 December 1941 (aged 21)		(Costa Rica) Alajuelense

=== Jamaica ===
Head coach: Antoine Tassy

No.	Pos.	Player	Date of birth (age)	Caps	Club
1	GK	Danville Clarke	16 February 1943 (aged 20)		(Jamaica) Railway
2	GK	John Fraser			(Jamaica) St. George's Old Boys
3	DF	Winthorpe Bell	7 June 1944 (aged 18)		(Jamaica) St. George´s Old Boys
4	DF	Lorenzo Wynter			(Jamaica) Railway
5	DF	Kenneth Barnes			(Jamaica) Regiment
6	DF	Richard Domville			(Jamaica) St. George´s Old Boys
7	DF	Roy Lee			(Jamaica) St. George´s Old Boys
8	MF	Frank Brown	25 December 1939 (aged 23)		(Jamaica) Railway
9	MF	Elvin Schools			(Jamaica) Y.M.C.A.
10	MF	Denzil Lue			(Jamaica) St. George´s Old Boys
11	MF	Henry Largie	31 December 1940 (aged 22)		(Jamaica) Y.M.C.A.
12	FW	Syd Bartlett	28 October 1938 (aged 24)		(Jamaica) Y.M.C.A.
13	FW	Lascelles Dunkley	10 March 1932 (aged 31)		(Jamaica) Y.M.C.A.
14	FW	Peter Lewin			(Jamaica) Y.M.C.A.
15	FW	Barry Coates			(Jamaica) Railway
16	FW	Billy Griffiths			(Jamaica) Cornwall
17	FW	Jimmy Ross			(Jamaica) Railway
18	FW	Van Goodison			(Jamaica) St. George´s Old Boys

=== Mexico ===
Head coach: Árpád Fekete

No.	Pos.	Player	Date of birth (age)	Caps	Club
1	GK	Antonio Mota	26 January 1939 (aged 24)		(Mexico) Oro
2	GK	Ignacio Martínez	3 December 1939 (aged 23)		(Mexico) UNAM
3	DF	José Vantolrá	30 March 1943 (aged 19)		(Mexico) Toluca
4	DF	Jesús del Muro	30 November 1937 (aged 25)		(Mexico) Atlas
5	DF	Ignacio Jáuregui	30 July 1938 (aged 24)		(Mexico) Atlas
6	DF	Gilberto Vega	21 July 1938 (aged 24)		(Mexico) Toluca
7	DF	Fernando Cuenca	7 April 1939 (aged 23)		(Mexico) América
8	DF	Gustavo Peña	22 November 1942 (aged 20)		(Mexico) Oro
9	MF	Albino Morales	30 May 1942 (aged 20)		(Mexico) Toluca
10	MF	Felipe Ruvalcaba	16 February 1941 (aged 22)		(Mexico) Oro
11	MF	José Luis Sánchez			(Mexico) Nacional
12	FW	Agustín Moreno	5 January 1939 (aged 24)		(Mexico) Guadalajara
13	FW	Isidoro Díaz	14 March 1938 (aged 25)		(Mexico) Guadalajara
14	FW	Guillermo Ortiz Camargo	25 June 1939 (aged 23)		(Mexico) Necaxa
15	FW	Francisco Jara	3 February 1941 (aged 22)		(Mexico) Guadalajara
16	FW	Catarino Tafoya	12 January 1940 (aged 23)		(Mexico) Atlas
17	FW	Vicente Pereda	18 July 1941 (aged 21)		(Mexico) Toluca
18	FW	Raúl Chávez	4 March 1939 (aged 24)		(Mexico) Monterrey
19	FW	Armando Garrido			(Mexico) América
20	FW	Jesús Delgado			(Mexico) Atlas
21	FW	José Rodríguez Sevilla	28 March 1939 (aged 23)		(Mexico) Nacional
21	FW	Carlos Zapata			(Mexico) Nacional
