= Neco (footballer, born 1933) =

Brazilian footballer

Personal information
- Full name: Manoel Tavares
- Date of birth: May 30, 1933
- Place of birth: Bauru, Brazil
- Date of death: 24 November 2020 (aged 87)
- Place of death: Guadalajara, Mexico
- Position: Forward

Youth career
- AA Orlândia

Senior career*
Years	Team	Apps	(Gls)
1950–1957	Botafogo-SP		
1957–1961	São Paulo	70	(36)
1961–1965	CD Oro		
- * Club domestic league appearances and goals as of 13 September 2023

Manoel Tavares (30 May 1933 – 24 November 2020), better known by the nickname Neco (sometimes referred as Necco), was a Brazilian professional footballer who played as a forward.

== Career ==
Neco played most of his career at Botafogo de Ribeirão Preto, where he was champion of the second level of Campeonato Paulista in 1956. He transferred to São Paulo where in 1959 he was the club's top scorer in the season with 31 goals. In 1961 he went to CD Oro, alongside another São Paulo FC players (Amaury Epaminondas, Juracy Gaetan, Carlito Peters), where they won the national title.

== Honours ==
=== Botafogo ===
- Campeonato Paulista Série A2: 1956

=== CD Oro ===
- Mexican Primera División: 1962–63

== Death ==
Neco died in Guadalajara, where he retired and started his family, at the age of 87, victim of a respiratory arrest.
