= Juracy Gaetan =

Brazilian footballer

Juracy
Personal information
- Full name: Juracy Luís Gaetan
- Date of birth: 21 June 1938 (age 88)
- Place of birth: Bady Bassitt, Brazil
- Position: Forward

Youth career
- Matinê (Mirassol)
- América-SP

Senior career*
Years	Team	Apps	(Gls)
1957	América-SP		
1958–1960	São Paulo	62	(10)
1960–1962	Oro		
1968	Houston Stars		
1969–1975	Dallas Tornado		
- * Club domestic league appearances and goals as of 22 November 2023

Juracy Luís Gaetan (born 21 June 1938), mostly known as Juracy, is a Brazilian former professional footballer who played as a forward.

== Career ==
Born in Borboletas, São Paulo (currently Bady Basitt), Juracy began his career at América de São José do Rio Preto. After a great match against São Paulo FC, he was hired by the club at the request of the manager Vicente Feola, where he remained until 1960.

Alongside Paulo Martorano, Amaury Epaminondas, Carlito Peters and Neco, he was part of the group of players who transferred to Mexican football, for CD Oro. He played for other clubs in Mexico and the United States, ending his career there in the 70s. He currently lives in the city of Mirassol, São Paulo.
