= José "Dumbo" Rodríguez =

Mexican footballer (1939–2015)

Personal information
- Full name: José Rodríguez Sevilla
- Date of birth: 28 March 1939
- Place of birth: Guadalajara, Jalisco, Mexico
- Date of death: 1 January 2015 (aged 75)
- Place of death: Colima, Colima, Mexico
- Position: Midfielder

Senior career*
Years	Team	Apps	(Gls)
1960–1963	Nacional		(8)
1963–1970	Atlas		(54)
1970–1975	Monterrey		

International career
1963–1969	Mexico	6	(0)
- * Club domestic league appearances and goals

José Trinidad Rodríguez Sevilla (28 March 1939 – 1 January 2015) was a Mexican football player and manager. Nicknamed "Dumbo", he played as a midfielder for Atlas and Monterrey throughout the 1960s and the mid-1970s. He also represented Mexico internationally for the 1963 and 1969 CONCACAF Championships.

== Club career ==
Rodríguez was born on 28 March 1939 in Guadalajara. He received his nickname of Dumbo due to his strong resemblance to Chivas forward Adalberto López. Seeing his talents, Rodríguez received his first contract with Nacional for the 1960–61 Mexican Segunda División season. His inaugural season would be highly successful as he was part of the winning squad for promotion to the top-flight of Mexican football. He then made his Liga MX debut during a 2–3 defeat against América at the Estadio Olímpico Universitario on 18 June 1961. Following scoring eight goals throughout his entire career with the Pericos, he then began playing for Atlas where throughout the course of his career, he would score 54 goals for the club, be part of the winning squad for the 1967–68 Copa México and become the top goalscorer for the 1970 season. He then played for Monterrey beginning in the 1970–71 season and would be known as a veteran player in an era of younger players emerging in the club such as Ubirajara Chagas, Guarací Barbosa, Magdaleno Cano, Daniel Ernesto Musante and Vicente Álvarez. He remained with the Rayados until his retirement following the 1974–75 season.

== International career ==
Rodríguez was called up to represent Mexico for the 1963 and 1969 CONCACAF Championship where he played as a substitute in the former and more prominently played in all five matches of the latter as well as in the qualification match against Bermuda that same year.

== Managerial career ==
He then became a manager as he continued his career with Monterrey with Ignacio Jáuregui. Notably, he managed Tampico Madero alongside Gustavo Peña to save the club from relegation as well as fully managed Loros UdeC during the 1985–86 Mexican Tercera División season.

== Personal life ==
Rodríguez died on 1 January 2015 at Colima.
