= Juca (disambiguation) =

Juca was a Portuguese football midfielder and coach.

Juca may also refer to:

- Juca (name), many people with the given name or surname
- Jucá River, river in Brazil
- Estádio Juca Ribeiro, stadium in Brazil
- "I-Juca-Pirama", Brazilian poem
