= Ignacio Martinez =

Ignacio Martinez may refer to:

- Ignacio Martínez (footballer) (born 1939), Mexican former football player and manager
- Ignacio Martínez de Pisón (born 1960), Spanish writer
- Ignacio Martinez Suarez (born 1963), Spanish photographer
- Ignacio Martínez (tennis) (born 1972), Mexican former professional tennis player
- Ignacio Martínez Trueba (born 1990), Spanish footballer
- Ignacio Martínez Urrutia (1887–?), Chilean businessman and politician
- Ygnacio Martínez (1774–1848), Mexican soldier and politician, alcalde of Yerba Buena
