= Nicaragua at the CONCACAF Gold Cup =

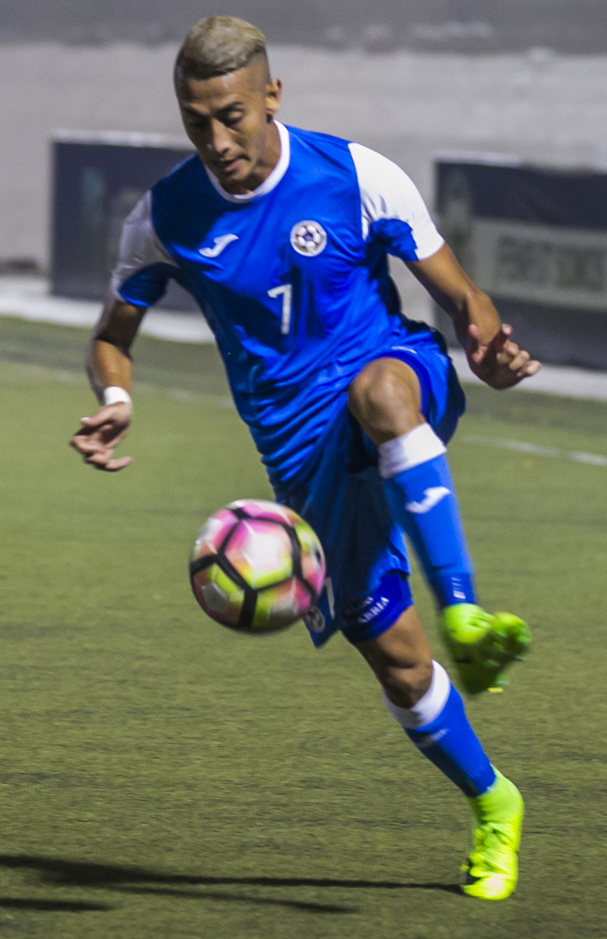
In 2017, Carlos Chavarría scored Nicaragua's only goal in the Gold Cup era, taking the lead against Panama in an eventual 1–2 defeat.

The CONCACAF Gold Cup is North America's major tournament in senior men's football and determines the continental champion. Until 1989, the tournament was known as CONCACAF Championship. It is currently held every two years. From 1996 to 2005, nations from other confederations have regularly joined the tournament as invitees. In earlier editions, the continental championship was held in different countries, but since the inception of the Gold Cup in 1991, the United States are constant hosts or co-hosts.

From 1973 to 1989, the tournament doubled as the confederation's World Cup qualification. CONCACAF's representative team at the FIFA Confederations Cup was decided by a play-off between the winners of the last two tournament editions in 2015 via the CONCACAF Cup, but was then discontinued along with the Confederations Cup.

Since 1963, the Gold Cup was held 27 times and has been won by seven different nations, most often by Mexico (12 titles).

Nicaragua took part in the inaugural CONCACAF Championship in 1963, and in five tournaments total. However, they were never able to make an impact, losing seventeen out of their eighteen matches. In 1967, they drew the host team, Honduras, 1–1.

== Overall record ==
CONCACAF Championship & Gold Cup record										Qualification record					
Year	Result	Position	Pld	W	D*	L	GF	GA	Squad	Pld	W	D	L	GF	GA
(El Salvador) 1963	Group stage	8th	4	0	0	4	2	15	Squad	Qualified automatically					
(Guatemala) 1965	Did not qualify									2	1	0	1	2	4
(Honduras) 1967	Sixth place	6th	5	0	1	4	3	12	Squad	2	1	0	1	4	4
(Costa Rica) 1969	Did not enter									Did not enter					
(Trinidad and Tobago) 1971	Did not qualify									2	0	0	2	2	4
(Haiti) 1973	Did not enter									Did not enter					
(Mexico) 1977	Did not enter									Did not enter					
(Honduras) 1981	Did not enter									Did not enter					
1985	Did not enter									Did not enter					
1989	Did not enter									Did not enter					
(United States) 1991	Did not qualify									2	0	0	2	2	5
(Mexico) (United States) 1993	Did not qualify									2	0	0	2	0	8
(United States) 1996	Did not qualify									2	0	0	2	0	7
(United States) 1998	Did not qualify									2	0	0	2	2	11
(United States) 2000	Did not qualify									2	0	0	2	0	2
(United States) 2002	Did not qualify									3	0	0	3	2	19
(Mexico) (United States) 2003	Did not qualify									5	1	0	4	1	11
(United States) 2005	Did not qualify									3	1	0	2	2	9
(United States) 2007	Did not qualify									4	1	0	3	6	14
(United States) 2009	Group stage	11th	3	0	0	3	0	8	Squad	4	1	2	1	5	6
(United States) 2011	Did not qualify									4	0	1	3	2	7
(United States) 2013	Did not qualify									3	0	1	2	2	5
(Canada) (United States) 2015	Did not qualify									3	0	0	3	0	6
(United States) 2017	Group stage	10th	3	0	0	3	1	7	Squad	7	2	1	4	9	9
(Costa Rica) (Jamaica) (United States) 2019	Group stage	15th	3	0	0	3	0	8	Squad	4	3	0	1	9	2
(United States) 2021	Did not qualify									6	2	1	3	9	11
(Canada) (United States) 2023	Disqualified									6	4	2	0	15	5
(Canada) (United States) 2025	Did not qualify									6	2	1	3	5	7
Total	Sixth place	5/28	18	0	1	17	6	50	—	74	19	9	46	79	154

=== Match overview ===
Tournament	Round	Opponent	Score	Venue
(El Salvador) 1963	First round	El Salvador	1–6	San Salvador
(El Salvador) 1963	First round	Guatemala	1–3	San Salvador
(El Salvador) 1963	First round	Honduras	0–1	San Salvador
(El Salvador) 1963	First round	Panama	0–5	San Salvador
(Honduras) 1967	Final round	Mexico	0–4	Tegucigalpa
(Honduras) 1967	Final round	Honduras	1–1	Tegucigalpa
(Honduras) 1967	Final round	Haiti	1–2	Tegucigalpa
(Honduras) 1967	Final round	Trinidad and Tobago	1–3	Tegucigalpa
(Honduras) 1967	Final round	Guatemala	0–2	Tegucigalpa
(United States) 2009	Group stage	Mexico	0–2	Oakland
(United States) 2009	Group stage	Guadeloupe	0–2	Houston
(United States) 2009	Group stage	Panama	0–4	Glendale
(United States) 2017	Group stage	Martinique	0–2	Nashville
(United States) 2017	Group stage	Panama	1–2	Tampa
(United States) 2017	Group stage	United States	0–3	Cleveland
(United States) (Costa Rica) (Jamaica) 2019	Group stage	Costa Rica	0–4	San José
(United States) (Costa Rica) (Jamaica) 2019	Group stage	Haiti	0–2	Frisco
(United States) (Costa Rica) (Jamaica) 2019	Group stage	Bermuda	0–2	Harrison
