= Andy Mate =

Soccer player (1940–2012)

Personal information
- Full name: Andrew Mate
- Date of birth: March 19, 1940
- Place of birth: Budapest, Hungary
- Date of death: May 13, 2012 (aged 72)
- Place of death: Hungary
- Position: Midfielder

Senior career*
Years	Team	Apps	(Gls)
–1964	New York Hungaria		
1964–1965	Hamburger SV	6	(2)
1967	New York Generals	2	(0)
1967	Philadelphia Spartans		
1968–1970	New York Hungaria		
1971	New York Cosmos	22	(16)
1975	New Jersey Americans		(1)

International career
1964	United States	1	(0)
- * Club domestic league appearances and goals

Andrew Mate (March 19, 1940 – May 13, 2012) was a soccer midfielder who spent most of his career in the German American Soccer League. He also played a season in the Bundesliga, one in the National Professional Soccer League and one in the North American Soccer League. Born in Hungary, he earned one cap with the U.S. national team in 1964.

== Club career ==
Mate spent most of his career with New York Hungaria of the German American Soccer League. In 1962, he won both the league and National Challenge Cup with Hungaria. He scored two of Hungaria's three goals in the win over the San Francisco Scots. In 1963 he scored all five goals in Hungaria's first round aggregate defeat of Mexico's Deportivo Oro in the CONCACAF Champions' Cup. He was the first American to score a hat trick in Concacaf Champions' Cup.

In 1964–65, Mate was in and out of the team with Hamburger SV in Germany where most sources referred to him as "Andreas" Mate (the Hungarian version would be Andras). In 1967, Mate played a single season with the New York Generals of the National Professional Soccer League. When the New York Cosmos entered the North American Soccer League in 1971, it drew much of its initial roster from the GASL. As a result, Mate played the Cosmos first season. In 1975, he played for the New Jersey Americans of the American Soccer League.

== International career ==
Mate earned one cap with the U.S. national team in a 10–0 loss to England on May 27, 1964.

== Death ==
Mate died in his native Hungary on May 13, 2012, at the age of 72.
