= 1963 CONCACAF Champions' Cup =

2nd edition of premier club football tournament organized by CONCACAF

Tournament details
- Dates: 10 March – 18 August 1963
- Teams: 9 (from 8 associations)
- Venue(s): Various (in 8 host cities)

Final positions
- Champions: (Haiti) Racing CH (1st title)
- Runners-up: (Mexico) Guadalajara

Tournament statistics
- Matches played: 17
- Goals scored: 46 (2.71 per match)
- Top scorer(s): Andy Mate (5 Goals)

The 1963 CONCACAF Champions' Cup was the 2nd edition of the top international club competition organized by CONCACAF for clubs from North America, Central America and the Caribbean, the CONCACAF Champions' Cup. It determined the 1963 continental football champions in the CONCACAF region. The tournament was played by 9 clubs from 8 national associations: Costa Rica, El Salvador, Guatemala, Haiti, Honduras, Mexico, Netherlands Antilles, and the United States. The tournament was played from 10 March 1963 till 18 August 1963.

== First round ==
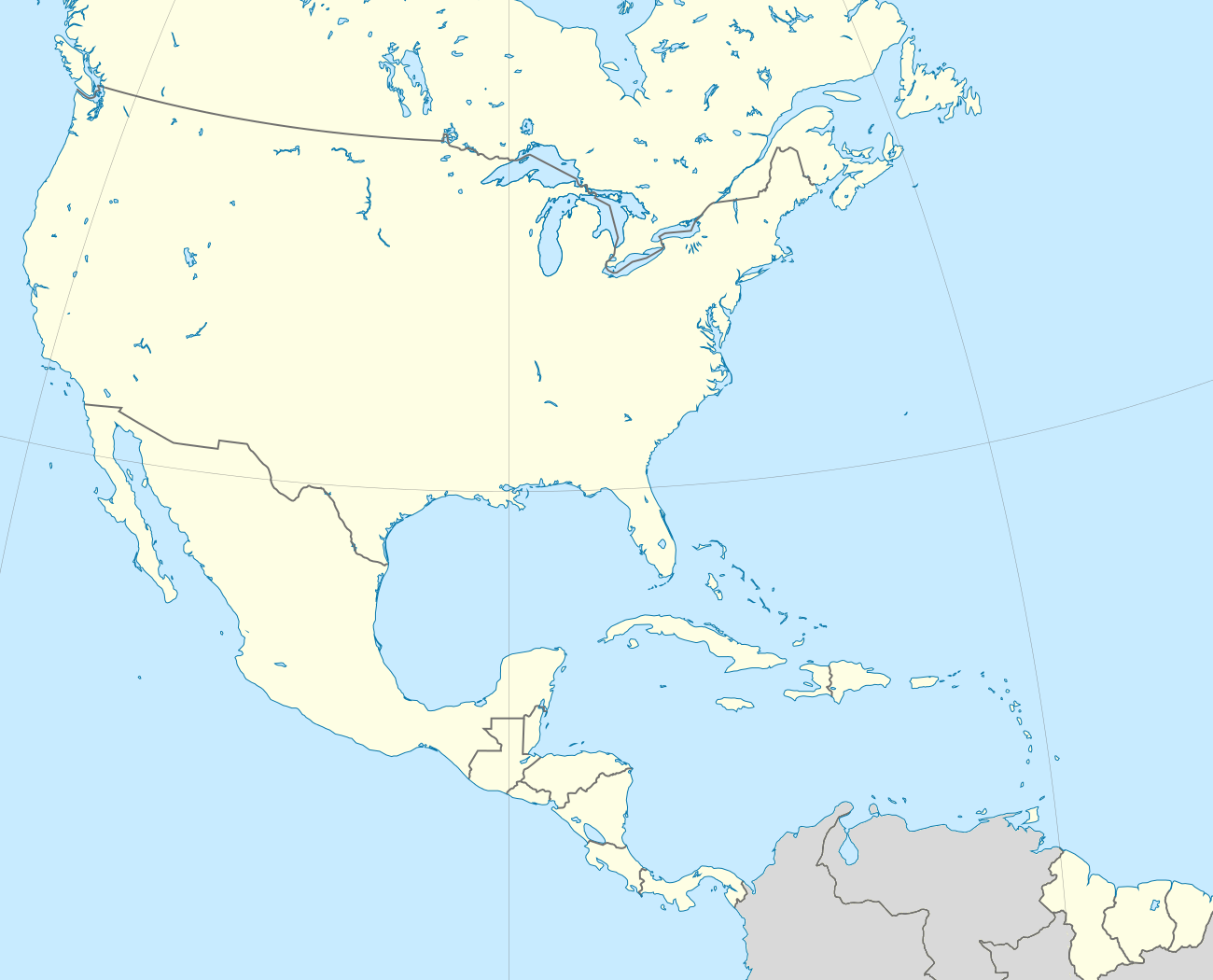
Location of teams of the 1963 CONCACAF Champions' Cup

10 March 1963 Caribbean Zone	Sithoc (Netherlands Antilles)	1–3	(Haiti) Racing CH	Willemstad, Netherlands Antilles
	Romualdo Valeriam 43'		Germain Champagne; Salomón Santvil 69'; Claude Limagree 86'	Stadium: Ergilio Hato Stadium

17 March 1963 Caribbean Zone	Racing CH (Haiti)	1–0 (4–1 agg.)	(Netherlands Antilles) Sithoc	Port-au-Prince, Haiti
	Salomón Santvil 52'			Stadium: Stade Sylvio Cator

- Guadalajara gets bye to second round for winning 1962 tournament.

15 March 1963 North American Zone	Oro (Mexico)	2–3	(United States) New York Hungaria	Guadalajara, Mexico
	Gustavo Peña 10'; Amaury Epaminondas 33'		Andy Mate 18' 53' 85'	Stadium: Estadio Jalisco

17 April 1963 North American Zone	New York Hungaria (United States)	2–2 (5–4 agg.)	(Mexico) Oro	New York City, United States
	Andy Mate 39' 82'		Jorge Rodríguez 34'; Gustavo Peña 49'	Stadium: Eindracht Oval

1963-04-28 Central American Zone	Vida (Honduras)	2–2	(Guatemala) Xelajú	La Ceiba, Honduras
	Israel Juárez 19'; Alberto Amaya 85'		Rufino López 34'; Sergio Anaya 54'	Stadium: Estadio Nilmo Edwards

1963-05-05 Central American Zone	Xelajú (Guatemala)	6–0 (8–2 agg.)	(Honduras) Vida	Quetzaltenango, Guatemala
	Rodolfo Chávez Lizano 25, 83'; Haroldo Juárez Arjona 34, 69'; Sergio Anaya 57'; Rufino López 79'			Stadium: Estadio Mario Camposeco

1963-04-28 Central American Zone	Saprissa (Costa Rica)	1–1	(El Salvador) FAS	San José, Costa Rica
	Rubén Jiménez 81'		Mario Nájera 75'	Stadium: Estadio Nacional

1963-05-05 Central American Zone	Saprissa (Costa Rica)	2–0 (3–1 agg.)	(El Salvador) FAS	San José, Costa Rica
	Rubén Jiménez 52'; Edgar Marín 85'			Stadium: Estadio Nacional

== Second round ==
- Saprissa received a bye to the third round.

1963-05-19 North American Zone playoff	New York Hungaria (United States)	0–0	(Mexico) Guadalajara	New York City, New York, (USA)
	Nil		Nil

1963-06-17 North American Zone playoff	Guadalajara (Mexico)	2–0	(United States) New York Hungaria	Estadio Jalisco; Guadalajara, Jalisco (MEX)
	Salvador Reyes Monteón; Javier Valdivia		Nil

- Guadalajara advanced to the final round 2–0 on aggregate.

== Final round ==
=== Semifinals ===
1963-07-07 Inter–Zone Play-off	Xelajú (Guatemala)	1–4	(Haiti) Racing CH	Quetzaltenango, Guatemala
	Haroldo Juárez 50'		Salomon Saint Vil 32, 72, 82'; Germain Champagne 62'

1963-07-14 Inter–Zone Play-off	Xelajú (Guatemala)	3–1	(Haiti) Racing CH	Guatemala City, Guatemala
	Rufino López 2, 49'; Sergio Anaya 10'		Joseph Obas 67'

==== Playoff rematch ====
Due to each team having won one match, a play-off was needed.

1963-07-17 Inter–Zone Play-off	Xelajú (Guatemala)	1–2	(Haiti) Racing CH	Guatemala City, Guatemala
	Juan Reyes 66'		Joseph Obas 9'; Nelson 26'

1963-08-14	Saprissa (Costa Rica)	0–1	(Mexico) Guadalajara	Estadio Nacional; San José, Costa Rica
	Nil		Salvador Reyes Monteón 43'

1963-08-18	Saprissa (Costa Rica)	0–2	(Mexico) Guadalajara	Estadio Nacional; San José, Costa Rica
	Nil		Salvador Reyes Monteón 35, 70'

- Guadalajara advanced to the final 3–0 on aggregate.

=== Final ===
Difficulties in securing passports for Racing CH players in time for the final match at Guadalajara caused the match to be postponed three times.

After Guadalajara protested to CONCACAF in February 1964, they were declared champions, but after a counter-protest, CONCACAF decided that both legs of the final should be played within two months of 2 April 1964. This decision meant that Guadalajara were forced to withdraw because they were on a tour of Europe during that time: therefore, the final was scratched, and Racing CH were declared CONCACAF champions.

Champions
(Haiti)
Racing CH
1st title
