= 1963 CONCACAF Championship =

Campeonato de Naciones de CONCACAF 1963

Tournament details
- Host country: El Salvador
- Dates: 23 March – 7 April
- Teams: 9 (from 1 confederation)
- Venue: 2 (in 2 host cities)

Final positions
- Champions: Costa Rica (1st title)
- Runners-up: El Salvador
- Third place: Netherlands Antilles
- Fourth place: Honduras

Tournament statistics
- Matches played: 22
- Goals scored: 76 (3.45 per match)
- Top scorer(s): (El Salvador) Eduardo Hernández (8 goals)

The 1963 CONCACAF Championship was the inaugural edition of the CONCACAF Championship, the top continental football tournament organized by CONCACAF for senior national teams from North America, Central America and the Caribbean. The tournament was held between 23 March to 7 April. It had 9 participating teams.

The tournament was hosted by El Salvador in the cities of San Salvador and Santa Ana. The nine teams were broken up into one group of five and one group of four; the top two teams of each group would advance to a final group stage, playing in round-robin format to determine the winner. The tournament was won by Costa Rica, who defeated the hosts El Salvador, Netherlands Antilles and Honduras in the four-team final group.

== Qualifying round ==
25 February 1963

Haiti	1–3	Netherlands Antilles

Jamaica

2 March 1963

Netherlands Antilles	1–0	Haiti

Jamaica

Netherlands Antilles qualifies to the tournament

== Participating teams ==
- Costa Rica
- El Salvador (Hosts)
- Guatemala
- Honduras
- Jamaica
- Mexico
- Netherlands Antilles (Qualifying winners)
- Nicaragua
- Panama

== Venues ==
San Salvador	1963 CONCACAF Championship is located in El Salvador	Santa Ana
Estadio Nacional Flor Blanca	1963 CONCACAF Championship is located in El Salvador	Estadio Santaneco
Capacity: 35,000	1963 CONCACAF Championship is located in El Salvador	Capacity: 15,000

== Final round ==
=== First round ===
==== Group A ====
Pos	Team	Pld	W	D	L	GF	GA	GD	Pts
1	Honduras	4	3	1	0	6	3	+3	7
2	El Salvador	4	1	3	0	10	5	+5	5
3	Panama	4	1	2	1	8	4	+4	4
4	Guatemala	4	1	2	1	7	6	+1	4
5	Nicaragua	4	0	0	4	2	15	−13	0

23 March 1963

Panama	2–2	Guatemala
Vega 73' (pen.); Díaz Gáez 82'		Roldán 48' de León 59'

Estadio Nacional Flor Blanca, San Salvador
Referee: Fernando Buergo (Mexico)
23 March 1963

El Salvador	6–1	Nicaragua
Hernández 4'; Monge 21', 63'; Ruiz 75', 87'; Ruano 81'		Mendieta 89'

Estadio Nacional Flor Blanca, San Salvador
Referee: Juan Soto Paris (Costa Rica)

25 March 1963

Honduras	1–0	Nicaragua
Rodríguez Reyes 31'

Estadio Nacional Flor Blanca, San Salvador
Referee: Ricardo Méndez (El Salvador)
25 March 1963

El Salvador	1–1	Panama
Hernández 87'		Velasco 82' (o.g.)

Estadio Nacional Flor Blanca, San Salvador
Referee: Saúl de la Rosa (Colombia)

27 March 1963

Guatemala	3–1	Nicaragua
de León 14' (pen.); Ewing 71'; Juárez 85'		Silva 39'

Estadio Nacional Flor Blanca, San Salvador
Referee: Fernando Buergo (Mexico)
27 March 1963

El Salvador	2–2	Honduras
Reynosa 30'; Hernández 65'		Guerra 16'; Suazo 27'

Estadio Nacional Flor Blanca, San Salvador
Referee: Saúl de la Rosa (Colombia)

29 March 1963

Panama	5–0	Nicaragua
Góyez 11'; Valderrama 41'; Santamaría 45', 58'; Ponce 71'

Estadio Nacional Flor Blanca, San Salvador
Referee: Saúl de la Rosa (Colombia)
29 March 1963

Honduras	2–1	Guatemala
Barahona 28'; Guerra 42'		López Contreras 9'

Estadio Nacional Flor Blanca, San Salvador
Referee: Juan Soto Paris (Costa Rica)

31 March 1963

Honduras	1–0	Panama
Edwards 46'

Estadio Nacional Flor Blanca, San Salvador
Referee: Carlos Luis Monge (Costa Rica)
31 March 1963

El Salvador	1–1	Guatemala
Hernández 24'		Peña 28'

Estadio Nacional Flor Blanca, San Salvador
Referee: Fernando Buergo (Mexico)

==== Group B ====
Pos	Team	Pld	W	D	L	GF	GA	GD	Pts
1	Costa Rica	3	2	1	0	7	0	+7	5
2	Netherlands Antilles	3	2	0	1	4	3	+1	4
3	Mexico	3	1	1	1	9	2	+7	3
4	Jamaica	3	0	0	3	1	16	−15	0

24 March 1963

Costa Rica	6–0	Jamaica
Marín 29', 35'; Gámez 37', 77'; González 73'; Vázquez 83'

Estadio Santaneco, Santa Ana
Referee: Jorge Méndez Montes de Oca (Guatemala)
24 March 1963

Netherlands Antilles	2–1	Mexico
Delanoy 12' del Muro 80' (o.g.)		Ortiz Camargo 24'

Estadio Santaneco, Santa Ana
Referee: José Isabel Morán (Panama)

28 March 1963

Mexico	8–0	Jamaica
Pereda 4'; Garrido 17'; Ortiz Camargo 27', 35' (pen.); Cuenca 49'; Díaz 77', 88'; Morales 80'

Estadio Santaneco, Santa Ana
Referee: José Urtecho Gutiérrez (Nicaragua)
28 March 1963

Costa Rica	1–0	Netherlands Antilles
Cordero 38' (pen.)

Estadio Santaneco, Santa Ana
Referee: Pedro da Cunha (Brazil)

30 March 1963

Costa Rica	0–0	Mexico

Estadio Santaneco, Santa Ana
Referee: Marco Tulio Cárcamo (Honduras)
30 March 1963

Netherlands Antilles	2–1	Jamaica
Briesen 8'; D. Pablo 73'		Dunkley 24'

Estadio Santaneco, Santa Ana
Referee: Saúl de la Rosa (Colombia)

=== Final round ===
Pos	Team	Pld	W	D	L	GF	GA	GD	Pts
1	Costa Rica	3	3	0	0	7	2	+5	6
2	El Salvador	3	2	0	1	7	6	+1	4
3	Netherlands Antilles	3	1	0	2	6	5	+1	2
4	Honduras	3	0	0	3	2	9	−7	0

3 April 1963

Netherlands Antilles	4–1	Honduras
Testing 2'; Sillie 21'; Brandborg 75', 89'		Suazo 32'

Estadio Nacional Flor Blanca, San Salvador
Attendance: 35,000
Referee: Jorge Méndez Montes de Oca (Guatemala)
3 April 1963

El Salvador	1–4	Costa Rica
Chacón 49'		González 17', 22', 72'; Pearson 76'

Estadio Nacional Flor Blanca, San Salvador
Attendance: 35,000
Referee: Saúl de la Rosa (Colombia)

5 April 1963

Costa Rica	1–0	Netherlands Antilles
Pearson 54'

Estadio Nacional Flor Blanca, San Salvador
Attendance: 35,000
Referee: Jorge Méndez Montes de Oca (Guatemala)
5 April 1963

El Salvador	3–0	Honduras
Monge 10'; Hernández 13', 34'

Estadio Nacional Flor Blanca, San Salvador
Attendance: 35,000
Referee: Saúl de la Rosa (Colombia)

7 April 1963

Costa Rica	2–1	Honduras
Córdoba 52'; Jiménez 59'		Cruz 49'

Estadio Nacional Flor Blanca, San Salvador
Attendance: 35,000
Referee: Jorge Méndez Montes de Oca (Guatemala)
7 April 1963

El Salvador	3–2	Netherlands Antilles
Hernández 14', 80'; González 60'		Testing 7'; J.M. Pablo 78'

Estadio Nacional Flor Blanca, San Salvador
Attendance: 35,000
Referee: Juan José Corado (Guatemala)

1963 CONCACAF Championship winners

Costa Rica
First title

== Statistics ==
=== Goalscorers ===
There were 76 goals scored in 22 matches, for an average of 3.45 goals per match.

8 goals

- (El Salvador) Eduardo Hernández

4 goals

- (Costa Rica) Juan González

3 goals

- (El Salvador) Mario Monge
- (Mexico) Guillermo Ortiz Camargo

2 goals

- (Costa Rica) Juan José Gámez
- (Costa Rica) Edgar Marín
- (Costa Rica) Walter Pearson
- (El Salvador) Rodolfo Ruiz
- (Guatemala) Eduardo de León
- (Honduras) Félix Guerra
- (Honduras) Carlos Suazo
- (Mexico) Isidoro Díaz
- (Netherlands Antilles) Ruben Brandborg
- (Netherlands Antilles) Eugene Testing
- (Panama) Juan Santamaría

1 goal

- (Costa Rica) Mario Cordero
- (Costa Rica) Enrique Córdoba
- (Costa Rica) Rubén Jiménez
- (Costa Rica) Luis Vázquez
- (El Salvador) Armando Chacón
- (El Salvador) Mauricio Ernesto González
- (El Salvador) César Reynosa
- (El Salvador) Alfredo Ruano
- (Guatemala) Antony Ewing
- (Guatemala) Haroldo Juárez
- (Guatemala) Francisco López Contreras
- (Guatemala) Hugo Peña
- (Guatemala) Jorge Roldán
- (Honduras) Felipe Barahona
- (Honduras) Dolores Cruz
- (Honduras) Nilmo Edwards
- (Honduras) René Rodríguez Reyes
- (Jamaica) Locelles Dinckley
- (Mexico) Fernando Cuenca
- (Mexico) Armando Garrido
- (Mexico) Albino Morales
- (Mexico) Vicente Pereda
- (Netherlands Antilles) Toribio Briesen
- (Netherlands Antilles) Ronald Delanoy
- (Netherlands Antilles) Daniel Pablo
- (Netherlands Antilles) Juan Maximiliano Pablo
- (Netherlands Antilles) George Sillie
- (Nicaragua) Armando Mendieta
- (Nicaragua) Dámaso Silva
- (Panama) Adolfo Díaz Gáez
- (Panama) Luis Góyez
- (Panama) Luis Carlos Ponce
- (Panama) Carlos Valderrama
- (Panama) Everardo Vega

1 own goal

- (El Salvador) Benjamín Velasco (against Panama)
- (Mexico) Jesús del Muro (against Netherlands Antilles)

== Team of the Tournament ==
Ideal XI by RSSSF
Goalkeeper	Defenders	Midfielders	Forwards
(Costa Rica) Asdrúbal Meneses	(El Salvador) Benjamín Velasco (Costa Rica) Mario Cordero (Netherlands Antilles) Juan Pablo (Honduras) Federico Budde	(El Salvador) César Reynosa (Netherlands Antilles) Ruben Brandborg (El Salvador) Mario Monge	(Costa Rica) Juan Gonzalez (El Salvador) Eduardo Hernández (Mexico) Guillermo Ortiz
