= Juca (name) =

Juca or Jucá is a nickname, given name or surname that may refer to the following people

== Nickname ==
- Juca nickname for Júlio Cernadas Pereira (1929–2007), Portuguese footballer
- Juca (footballer, born 1979) nickname for Juliano Roberto Antonello, Brazilian footballer
- Juca Baleia (born 1959), Brazilian footballer and manager
- Juca Chaves (1938–2023), Brazilian entertainer
- Juca de Oliveira (1935–2026), Brazilian actor, playwright and theatre director
- Juca Kfouri (born 1950), Brazilian sports journalist

== Surname ==
- Marcelo Jucá (born 1963), Brazilian swimmer
- Romero Jucá (born 1954), Brazilian politician

== See also ==
- Juca (disambiguation)
