= Sergio Anaya =

Mexican footballer (born 1942)

Personal information
- Full name: Sergio Enrique Anaya Basave
- Date of birth: 22 May 1942 (age 84)
- Place of birth: Mexico City, Mexico
- Position: Central midfielder

Youth career
- 1952–1953: Loreto
- 1952–1953: Xelajú

Senior career*
Years	Team	Apps	(Gls)
1959–1966	Xelajú		(51)
1966–1971	León		(55)
1971–1973	Pumas UNAM		
1973–1974	Unión de Curtidores		

International career
1967–1968	Mexico	2	(0)

Managerial career
- 1982–1983: León
- * Club domestic league appearances and goals

Sergio Enrique Anaya Basave (born 22 May 1942) is a retired Mexican football player and manager. Nicknamed "Xelajú", he played in Guatemala for Xelajú as the first Mexican to play in the Liga Nacional as well as playing in Mexico for León and Pumas UNAM throughout the 1960s and early 1970s. He also represented Mexico internationally in the late 1960s.

== Youth career ==
Sergio was born on 22 May 1942 at Mexico City before shortly moving to Guatemala with his three brothers and four sisters. He initially didn't care much about football but was later inspired by a goal scored by his older brother whilst he was playing for a local club known as Real Santa María. Later on when he was between the ages of 12 and 13, Anaya played in the amateur leagues of Mexico City with many clubs wanting to sign him due to his speed and talents. He later played for Loreto alongside other players such as Agustín Peniche, Francisco Noriega and Mario Velarde. He later transferred to the amateur leagues of Venustiano Carranza for both Ferretera Tacuba and Xelajú, mainly playing as a forward but also playing as an emergency goalkeeper if none were available at the moment.

== Club career ==
Anaya made his debut at 17 years of age for Xelajú in 1959. He contributed to the club's golden age throughout the 1960s, winning both the 1961–62 and 1961–62 under club manager Arnoldo Camposeco. He also participated in various editions of the CONCACAF Champions' Cup, notably playing in the tense games against Haitan club Racing CH in the 1963 CONCACAF Champions' Cup alongside Chacatay López. Throughout his career with the club, he often had great chemistry with central defender Humberto Vanderkam as the two corroborated each other's movements and choices. His career with Xelajú would allow him to demonstrate a freer style of play not seen back in Mexico throughout his eight seasons with 51 goals. Soon enough, he had managed to catch the interest of other clubs in Central America as following the 1964–65 season, FAS and Águila of El Salvador expressed interest in signing him following Xelajú wanting to sell him. However, recent León manager Luis Grill Prieto traveled to Guatemala City to sign Anaya for the club.

He made his debut in the inaugural match against Monterrey but despite the signing, Anaya had desired to return to Guatemala with this being extensively discussed amongst the local press to the point of catching the attention of club president Alfonso Sánchez. During the match against América on 27 March 1966 for the 1965–66 Copa México, he played a significant role in the Esmeraldas triumphing and reaching the final against Necaxa. The following loss in the final convinced the upper management that the foreign players they had signed held the team back and, in the following, 1966–67 season, only Mexican players were allowed to play and for a brief time, the club had some modicum of success as they won the 1966–67 Copa México following successes over Deportivo Toluca and Nexaca. Throughout this generation, he developed a sense of comradery with goalkeeper Tongolele Muñoz, Olegario Montalvo Roberto López, Efraín, and Gil Loza, Pachuco López, Salvador Enríquez, Carlos Barajas, Gabriel Mata and Luis Estrada with Anaya especially typically playing alongside Estrada as he helped Estrada be the top goal scorer of the 1968–69 Mexican Primera División. Anaya himself would later achieve this feat during the 1970 Mexican Primera División.

With the arrival of Antonio Carbajal as club manager in 1970, he had decided to abolish the pure-Mexican policy held by the club as he signed some Argentinian players for the club with Anaya largely being absent for the 1970–71 season due to injury during training and wouldn't play for another six months. Alongside players such as Rafael Albrecht, Jorge Davino and Juan José Valiente, las Esmeraldas once again achieved victory in the 1970–71 Copa México. Despite this success however, the 1970s marked the beginning of internal conflict between Anaya and Carbajal with his traditional number of "10" being given to Davino being a major turning point of this. Eventually, Anaya chose to retire from the club after scoring 55 goals with offers from Nexaca and Pumas UNAM available to him. He ultimately chose UNAM as the club still had a similar policy of only allowing Mexicans on their team as well as his former Loreto teammate Velarde and Miguel Mejía Barón. Despite this, he wasn't content with his tenure in the second-tier of Mexican football and resigned after the 1972–73 season.

He was then approached with offers from Pachuca and Zacatepec with the latter even giving him training regiments. Ultimately, he returned to León to be loaned out to Unión de Curtidores. The Curtidores were in the top of their group stage to qualify for the promotional playoffs against Tigres UANL but ultimately lost 3–2. Despite this however, the number of clubs for the Primera División would increase from 18 to 20 for the 1974–75 Mexican Primera División. However, Anaya prematurely retired at the age of 32 after he found out that Carbajal would be the new club manager for the following season.

== International career ==
Anaya was first called up to represent Mexico in a friendly against Colombia on 8 January 1967 with his second appearance being in another friendly against Colombia on 30 January 1968.

== Managerial career ==
In 1975, he returned to Club León as an auxiliary manager to José Gomes Nogueira following the suspension of Washington Etchamendi. Anaya briefly went to Brazil to study the physical plays there so that he could return more knowledgeable of Gomes Nogueira's style of training. He became full-time manager of León for the 1982–83 season following the departure of Luis Grill with Gabriel Mata serving as his auxiliary manager until Árpád Fekete returned the following season.

== Personal life ==
Alongside his former teammate Luis Estrada, Anaya attended the funeral of León president Primo Quiroz Durán on 3 February 2025.
