= 1959 São Paulo FC season =

São Paulo
1959 season
- Chairman: Laudo Natel
- Manager: Armando Renganeschi; Vicente Feola
- Torneio Rio-São Paulo: 5th
- Campeonato Paulista: 4th

The 1959 football season was São Paulo's 30th season since club's existence.

== Overall ==
Games played	78 (9 Torneio Rio-São Paulo, 38 Campeonato Paulista, 31 Friendly match)
Games won	41 (4 Torneio Rio-São Paulo, 22 Campeonato Paulista, 15 Friendly match)
Games drawn	20 (2 Torneio Rio-São Paulo, 9 Campeonato Paulista, 9 Friendly match)
Games lost	17 (3 Torneio Rio-São Paulo, 7 Campeonato Paulista, 7 Friendly match)
Goals scored	160
Goals conceded	101
Goal difference	+59
Best result	6–0 (H) v Jabaquara - Campeonato Paulista - 1959.07.30
Worst result	1–4 (A) v Santos - Friendly match - 1959.04.05
Most appearances	
Top scorer	

Source: São Paulo FC

== Friendlies ==
February 1 National	Londrina	2–3	São Paulo	Londrina
	Goal		Goal	Stadium: Estádio Vitorino Gonçalves Dias

February 15 National	Jaboticabal	0–3	São Paulo	Jaboticabal
			Goal

February 17 National	Grêmio	1–0	São Paulo	Porto Alegre
	Goal

February 19 National	Internacional	0–0	São Paulo	Porto Alegre
				Stadium: Estádio Ildo Meneghetti (dos Eucaliptos)

February 22 National	Juventude	2–3	São Paulo	Caxias do Sul
	Goal		Goal	Stadium: Quinta dos Pinheiros

March 12 National	EC São Bernardo	1–1	São Paulo	São Bernardo do Campo
	Goal		Goal

March 15 National	São Paulo	1–1	Portuguesa	São Paulo
	Goal		Goal	Stadium: Estádio Independência (Canindé)

March 22 Troféu Roberto Ugolini	Juventus	0–3	São Paulo	São Paulo
			Goal	Stadium: Estádio Conde Rodolfo Crespi (Rua Javari)

March 26 National	Portuguesa	0–1	São Paulo	São Paulo
			Goal	Stadium: Estádio Independência (Canindé)

April 1 Troféu Roberto Ugolini	São Paulo	2–1	Corinthians	São Paulo
	Goal		Goal	Stadium: Estádio Municipal Paulo Machado de Carvalho (Pacaembu)

April 3 Troféu Roberto Ugolini	Palmeiras	3–0	São Paulo	São Paulo
	Goal			Stadium: Estádio Municipal Paulo Machado de Carvalho (Pacaembu)

April 5 National	Santos	4–1	São Paulo	Santos
	Goal		Goal	Stadium: Estádio Urbano Caldeira (Vila Belmiro)

May 24 International	Alianza Lima (Peru)	3–4	(Brazil) São Paulo	Lima
	Goal		Goal	Stadium: Estadio Nacional

May 28 International	Sporting Cristal (Peru)	2–4	(Brazil) São Paulo	Lima
	Goal		Goal	Stadium: Estadio Nacional

May 31 International	Deportivo Municipal (Peru)	0–0	(Brazil) São Paulo	Lima
				Stadium: Estadio Nacional

June 3 International	Alianza Lima (Peru)	1–2	(Brazil) São Paulo	Lima
	Goal		Goal	Stadium: Estadio Nacional

June 5 International	Millonarios (Colombia)	2–2	(Brazil) São Paulo	Bogotá
	Goal		Goal	Stadium: Estadio Nemesio Camacho (El Campín)

June 7 International	Santa Fe (Colombia)	2–1	(Brazil) São Paulo	Bogotá
	Goal		Goal	Stadium: Estadio Nemesio Camacho (El Campín)

June 9 International	Deportivo Cali (Colombia)	1–0	(Brazil) São Paulo	Cali
	Goal

June 11 International	Independiente Medellín (Colombia)	1–5	(Brazil) São Paulo	Medellín
	Goal		Goal

June 17 International	Atlético Nacional (Colombia)	0–5	(Brazil) São Paulo	Medellín
			Goal

June 18 International	América de Cali (Colombia)	0–2	(Brazil) São Paulo	Cali
			Goal

June 21 International	España (Ecuador)	2–1	(Brazil) São Paulo	Quito
	Goal		Goal

June 24 International	Barcelona (Ecuador)	1–4	(Brazil) São Paulo	Guayaquil
	Goal		Goal

June 29 International	Universitario (Peru)	2–2	(Brazil) São Paulo	Lima
	Goal		Goal	Stadium: Estadio Nacional

August 25 National	Bahia	1–1	São Paulo	Salvador
	Goal		Goal	Stadium: Estádio Octávio Mangabeira (Fonte Nova)

August 27 National	Vitória	2–2	São Paulo	Salvador
	Goal		Goal

August 30 Taça Federação Sergipana	Vitória	1–1	São Paulo	Aracaju
	Goal		Goal

December 6 National	Uberlândia	2–3	São Paulo	Uberlândia
	Goal		Goal	Stadium: Estádio Juca Ribeiro

December 8 National	Uberaba	1–2	São Paulo	Uberaba
	Goal		Goal	Stadium: Estádio Doutor Boulanger Pucci

== Official competitions ==
=== Torneio Rio-São Paulo ===
April 8 1	São Paulo	2–3	America-RJ	São Paulo
	Goal		Goal	Stadium: Estádio Municipal Paulo Machado de Carvalho (Pacaembu)

April 12 2	Vasco da Gama	0–0	São Paulo	Rio de Janeiro
				Stadium: Estádio Municipal do Rio de Janeiro (Maracanã)

April 16 3	São Paulo	4–3	Portuguesa	São Paulo
	Goal		Goal	Stadium: Estádio Municipal Paulo Machado de Carvalho (Pacaembu)

April 19 4	Botafogo	3–1	São Paulo	Rio de Janeiro
	Goal		Goal	Stadium: Estádio Municipal do Rio de Janeiro (Maracanã)

April 23 5	São Paulo	4–3	Palmeiras	São Paulo
	Goal		Goal	Stadium: Estádio Municipal Paulo Machado de Carvalho (Pacaembu)

April 26 6	Santos	4–3	São Paulo	São Paulo
	Goal		Goal	Stadium: Estádio Municipal Paulo Machado de Carvalho (Pacaembu)

May 2 7	São Paulo	3–2	Fluminense	São Paulo
	Goal		Goal	Stadium: Estádio Municipal Paulo Machado de Carvalho (Pacaembu)

May 7 8	São Paulo	2–2	Corinthians	São Paulo
	Goal		Goal	Stadium: Estádio Municipal Paulo Machado de Carvalho (Pacaembu)

May 16 9	São Paulo	4–2	Flamengo	São Paulo
	Goal		Goal	Stadium: Estádio Municipal Paulo Machado de Carvalho (Pacaembu)

==== Record ====
Final Position	Points	Matches	Wins	Draws	Losses	Goals For	Goals Away	Win%
5th	10	9	4	2	3	23	22	45%

=== Campeonato Paulista ===
July 15 1	Nacional	0–3	São Paulo	São Paulo
			Goal	Stadium: Estádio Nicolau Alayon (Estádio Comendador Sousa)

July 18 2	São Paulo	5–0	XV de Piracicaba	São Paulo
	Goal			Stadium: Estádio Municipal Paulo Machado de Carvalho (Pacaembu)

July 22 3	São Paulo	2–0	Comercial	São Paulo
	Goal			Stadium: Estádio Municipal Paulo Machado de Carvalho (Pacaembu)

July 26 4	Taubaté	1–1	São Paulo	Taubaté
	Goal		Goal	Stadium: Campo do Bosque

July 30 5	São Paulo	6–0	Jabaquara	São Paulo
	Goal			Stadium: Estádio Municipal Paulo Machado de Carvalho (Pacaembu)

August 2 6	São Paulo	2–2	Ferroviária	São Paulo
	Goal		Goal	Stadium: Estádio Municipal Paulo Machado de Carvalho (Pacaembu)

August 6 7	São Paulo	1–0	Juventus	São Paulo
	Goal			Stadium: Estádio Municipal Paulo Machado de Carvalho (Pacaembu)

August 9 8	Noroeste	1–0	São Paulo	Bauru
	Goal			Stadium: Campo do Bauru

August 12 9	São Paulo	5–0	XV de Jaú	São Paulo
	Goal			Stadium: Estádio Municipal Paulo Machado de Carvalho (Pacaembu)

August 16 10	América-SP	0–2	São Paulo	São José do Rio Preto
			Goal	Stadium: Estádio Mário Alves de Mendonça

August 19 11	São Paulo	4–2	Guarani	São Paulo
	Goal		Goal	Stadium: Estádio Municipal Paulo Machado de Carvalho (Pacaembu)

August 23 12	São Paulo	0–0	Portuguesa	São Paulo
				Stadium: Estádio Municipal Paulo Machado de Carvalho (Pacaembu)

September 6 13	Botafogo-SP	1–0	São Paulo	Ribeirão Preto
	Goal			Stadium: Estádio Luís Pereira (Vila Tibério)

September 9 14	Palmeiras	2–0	São Paulo	São Paulo
	Goal			Stadium: Estádio Municipal Paulo Machado de Carvalho (Pacaembu)

September 13 15	Ponte Preta	1–1	São Paulo	Campinas
	Goal		Goal	Stadium: Estádio Moisés Lucarelli

September 24 16	São Paulo	3–0	Comercial	São Paulo
	Goal			Stadium: Estádio Conde Rodolfo Crespi (Rua Javari)

September 27 17	Santos	1–2	São Paulo	São Paulo
	Goal		Goal	Stadium: Estádio Municipal Paulo Machado de Carvalho (Pacaembu)

September 30 18	Portuguesa Santista	1–2	São Paulo	Santos
	Goal		Goal	Stadium: Estádio Ulrico Mursa

October 3 19	Corinthians	0–1	São Paulo	São Paulo
			Goal	Stadium: Estádio Municipal Paulo Machado de Carvalho (Pacaembu)

October 10 20	São Paulo	1–2	Noroeste	São Paulo
	Goal		Goal	Stadium: Estádio Municipal Paulo Machado de Carvalho (Pacaembu)

October 15 21	São Paulo	3–0	Botafogo-SP	São Paulo
	Goal			Stadium: Estádio Municipal Paulo Machado de Carvalho (Pacaembu)

October 18 22	XV de Piracicaba	2–2	São Paulo	Piracicaba
	Goal		Goal	Stadium: Estádio Roberto Gomes Pedroza

October 24 23	Jabaquara	1–2	São Paulo	Santos
	Goal		Goal	Stadium: Estádio Urbano Caldeira (Vila Belmiro)

October 28 24	São Paulo	2–1	América-SP	São Paulo
	Goal		Goal	Stadium: Estádio Municipal Paulo Machado de Carvalho (Pacaembu)

November 1 25	XV de Jaú	0–0	São Paulo	Jaú
				Stadium: Estádio Artur Simões

November 5 26	São Paulo	4–0	Corinthians	São Paulo
	Goal			Stadium: Estádio Municipal Paulo Machado de Carvalho (Pacaembu)

November 8 27	São Paulo	3–2	Portuguesa	São Paulo
	Goal		Goal	Stadium: Estádio Municipal Paulo Machado de Carvalho (Pacaembu)

November 12 28	São Paulo	4–2	Portuguesa Santista	São Paulo
	Goal		Goal	Stadium: Estádio Municipal Paulo Machado de Carvalho (Pacaembu)

November 15 29	Comercial	4–4	São Paulo	Ribeirão Preto
	Goal		Goal	Stadium: Rua Tibiriçá

November 18 30	Juventus	2–2	São Paulo	São Paulo
	Goal		Goal	Stadium: Estádio Conde Rodolfo Crespi (Rua Javari)

November 22 31	Guarani	0–2	São Paulo	Campinas
			Goal	Stadium: Estádio Brinco de Ouro da Princesa

November 28 32	Comercial	2–0	São Paulo	São Paulo
	Goal			Stadium: Estádio Palestra Itália (Parque Antártica)

December 2 33	São Paulo	2–1	Nacional	São Paulo
	Goal		Goal	Stadium: Estádio Palestra Itália (Parque Antártica)

December 10 34	São Paulo	1–1	Ponte Preta	São Paulo
	Goal		Goal	Stadium: Estádio Municipal Paulo Machado de Carvalho (Pacaembu)

December 13 35	Santos	4–3	São Paulo	Santos
	Goal		Goal	Stadium: Estádio Urbano Caldeira (Vila Belmiro)

December 16 36	São Paulo	1–2	Taubaté	São Paulo
	Goal		Goal	Stadium: Estádio Palestra Itália (Parque Antártica)

December 20 37	São Paulo	2–0	Palmeiras	São Paulo
	Goal			Stadium: Estádio Municipal Paulo Machado de Carvalho (Pacaembu)

December 27 38	Ferroviária	0–1	São Paulo	Araraquara
			Goal	Stadium: Estádio Doutor Adhemar de Barros (Fonte Luminosa)

==== Record ====
Final Position	Points	Matches	Wins	Draws	Losses	Goals For	Goals Away	Win%
4th	53	38	22	9	7	79	38	69%
