= Roberto Tyrrel =

Panamanian footballer (1936–1999)

Personal information
- Full name: Roberto Evans Tyrrel Jessamy
- Date of birth: April 10, 1936
- Place of birth: Panama City, Panama
- Date of death: April 25, 1999 (aged 63)
- Place of death: Panama City, Panama
- Position: Goalkeeper

Senior career*
Years	Team	Apps	(Gls)
1950–	Don Bosco		
- Ancón
- Unión Española
1961–1974	Alajuelense	189	

International career^{‡}
	Panama	6	(0)
- * Club domestic league appearances and goals ‡ National team caps and goals as of 15 August 2015

Roberto Evans Tyrrel Jessamy (April 10, 1936 – April 25, 1999) was a Panamanian footballer who played 24 years as a professional goalkeeper in both the Panamanian football league and Costa Rica football league.

== Club career ==
Roberto Tyrrel debut came when he was 14 years old with Panamanian team Don Bosco, and also played for local sides Ancon and Union Española, until finally landing in 1961 in Costa Rican professional team Alajuelense, where he became the first foreigner contracted by such team. There he won three Primera Division championships (1966, 1970 and 1971) and in 1967 he was crowned Campeon de Campeones still with Alajuelense. It is said his most notable game was against Ramonense in 1970 where he played midfield and scored two goals against los poetas. He played 189 league games for Liga. He retired in 1974.

== International career ==
In his natal Panama he is considered one of the best goalkeepers who has ever defended the Panamanian goal, although he played very little on their national team. His debut with the Panama national team followed when he played in the I Campeonato Centroamericano y del Caribe in San José, Costa Rica in December 1954 as a member of the youth team. Tyrrel later played at the 1963 CONCACAF Championship and totaled 6 games with the national team until his retirement in 1974.

== Personal life and death ==
He was born in 1936 in barrio El Cangrejo, Panama City one of five children of Carlos Ricardo Tyrell and Olga Amanda Jessamy de Tyrel. Tyrrel was married to Costa Rican national Ana Cecilia Marín Alfaro for 37 years and the couple had three children. He worked for a Panamanian beer company and for a wire and cable company.

He suffered from prostate cancer and died in April 1999 of a heart attack while playing with one of his grandchildren.
