= Liceo de Varones =

Club Liceo
- Full name: Club Liceo de Guadalajara
- Nickname(s): Seminaristas
- Founded: 1906
- Ground: Ciudad Blanca; Guadalajara, Jalisco
- League: Defunct
Home colours	Away colours

Club Liceo was a former Mexican football club that played in the Liga Occidental De Jalisco. This club along with Guadalajara, Atlético Occidental, Excelsior, Cuauhtémoc and Iturbide were the first clubs to be founded in the state of Jalisco in 1906. The club folded in 1915 when the tournament wasn't held and decided not to come back in 1917 when the tournament came back.

== History ==
The club's history dates back to 1906 and was one of the first clubs to be established in the state of Jalisco along with Guadalajara, Excelsior, Liceo de Varones, Cuauhtémoc and Iturbide who were also established that same year. Most of the other clubs were private schools that had taken up the sport, as in the case of Liceo de Varones. The club was mostly made up of seminarians who had brought the sport from Europe. The Liga Occidental De Jalisco was established in 1908 with a great success that first year Guadalajara took the title. The following year the club would finish runner up to Guadalajara who would take the cup for the second year. In that short period of time a great rivalry started with Guadalajara and was the first Derby in the league. The club would go on to win the next two championships and in both years Guadalajara would finish runner up makings the matches between these two clubs even more intense, with several violent incidents in the matches.

The league did not held the tournament in 1914 or 1915 and once the league came back in 1916 the club did not return due to the dismantling of the Institution of Liceo de Varones.

== Players ==
=== Goal Scores Champions ===
- 1912-13 - Agustín Valenzuela 6 goals

=== All time goal scorer ===
- (Mexico) José "Chepe" Naranjo 6 goals

== Honors ==
=== Amateur Era ===
- Liga Occidental De Jalisco (3): 1910–11, 1912–13, 1913–14.
- Runner-up 1909-10 y 1911–12.
