= Liga Occidental de Jalisco =

Former football league in Mexico

Liga Amateur de Jalisco
- Founded: 1908
- Folded: 1943
- Country: Mexico
- Divisions: 3
- Level on pyramid: 3
- Most championships: Guadalajara (13)
- Website: www.femexfut.org.mx

Liga Amateur de Jalisco was a football league in Mexico founded by Federación Deportiva de Occidente de Aficionados, where clubs from the city of Guadalajara played from 1908 to 1943. The league folded in 1943, when the Primera División de México, the first professional league in Mexico was founded. Important clubs came out of this league, such as Guadalajara, Atlas, Nacional and Oro.

== History ==
As early as 1906 clubs around the city of Guadalajara had been founded, and they began playing friendly matches. The first clubs to be established in 1906 were Guadalajara, Atlético Occidental, Excelsior, Liceo de Varones, Cuauhtémoc and Iturbide. Most of the players who played for these clubs were workers and miners from the factories and mines around the city. These first clubs faced problems, such as learning the rules of this new sport, as well as learning how to make the ball which they needed to play. The balls they had been introduced to had been brought by wealthy men returning from Europe.

In 1908 Rafael Orozco, President of Club Guadalajara pitched an idea to create a league, and so in that same year the Liga Tapatía de fútbol was founded with Rafael Orozco as president, Alberto de la Mora as secretary, and Agustín Arce as treasurer.

The two first tournaments were played in various fields and amateur styles, and thus the two first titles went to Guadalajara. By 1910, due to the Mexican Revolution, most of the fields had been affected by fighting, making it difficult for the tournament to be played. Nonetheless, the tournament went on, with Liceo de Varones taking the cup that year. That club was mostly made up by seminarians. Guadalajara and Liceo de Varones became the first derby in the league.

In 1916 Atlas was founded by young returning students that had studied in England, and they brought a different style to Mexico. This club represented the high-class society in the city of Guadalajara, and became rivals with Guadalajara, therefore quickly becoming a Derby, considered the oldest in Mexico, and is referred to as the Clásico Tapatío.

The following years, from 1917 to 1921, Atlas due to the experience they had gained playing in England—went on to win four consecutive leagues. That all came to and end in 1922 when Guadalajara, with new and experienced players, managed to with the next four titles, from 1922 to 1925, once again claiming supremacy in the league.

In 1926 the Primera Fuerza invited a club from the league to play, and so the Selección Jalisco was formed, made up with the best players from Guadalajara, Atlas, Oro, Nacional and Morelos. With good performance by the Selección Jalisco, many players did return to their clubs, signed by the top clubs in Mexico City. This had an effect on the Tapatio League, but would also encourage other players to take their spot, which helped the league to continue.

== Amateur Era Occidental League Champions (1908–1943) ==
Season	Champion	Runner-Up
1908–09	Guadalajara	Atlético Occidental
1909–10	Guadalajara	Liceo de Varones
1910–11	Liceo de Varones	Guadalajara
1911–12	Guadalajara	Liceo de Varones
1912–13	Liceo de Varones	Guadalajara
1913–14	Liceo de Varones	Guadalajara
1914–15	Not Played
1915–16	Not Played
1916–17	Colón	Guadalajara
1917–18	Atlas	Colón
1918–19	Atlas	Guadalajara
1919–20	Atlas	Colón
1920–21	Atlas	Guadalajara
1921–22	Guadalajara	Atlas
1922–23	Guadalajara	Atlas
1923–24	Guadalajara	Atlas
1924–25	Guadalajara	Nacional
1925–26	Nacional	Guadalajara
1926–27	Nacional	Atlas
1927–28	Guadalajara	Nacional
1928–29	Guadalajara	Nacional
1929–30	Guadalajara	Nacional
1930–31	Nacional	Atlas
1931–32	Nacional	Guadalajara
1932–33	Guadalajara	Latino
1933–34	Nacional	Atlas
1934–35	Guadalajara	Atlas
1935–36	Atlas	Nacional
1936–37	Nacional	Atlas
1937–38	Guadalajara	Nacional
1938–39	Nacional	Oro
1939–40	Oro	Nacional
1940–41	S.U.T.A.J.	Nacional
1941–42	Rastro	Oro
1942–43	Oro	Rastro

=== Champions ===
The total championships by each club are summarized in the following chart.

Team	Championships
Guadalajara	13
Nacional	7
Atlas	5
Liceo de Varones	3
Oro	2
Colón	1
S.U.T.A.J.	1
Rastro	1

=== Top scorer ===
Year	Name	Club	Goals
1908-09	Eugenio Cherpenel	Guadalajara	
1909-10	Guillermo Simoni	Guadalajara	
1910-11	Salvador Palafox	Guadalajara	
1912-13	Agustín Valenzuela	Liceo de Varones	6
1913-14	Daniel Benítez	Liceo de Varones	6
1918-19	Pedro Fernández del Valle	Atlas	7
1921-22	Anastasio Prieto	Guadalajara	4
1922-23	Anastasio Prieto	Guadalajara	9
1923-24	Daniel Gómez	Nacional	6
1937-38	Salvador Suárez	Guadalajara	
