= Rafael Valek =

Colombian footballer (1932-2013)

Personal information
- Full name: Rafael Valek Moure
- Date of birth: 18 December 1932
- Place of birth: Bogotá, Colombia
- Date of death: 17 June 2013 (aged 80)
- Place of death: Pasto, Colombia
- Position: Winger

Senior career*
Years	Team	Apps	(Gls)
1948	Santa Fe	0	(0)
1948–1952	Millonarios	19	(1)
1951	→ Universidad Bogotá (loan)	14	(7)
1953	Genoa		
1955–1956	Oro		
- Celaya
1956–1957	Irapuato		
1958	Cúcuta Deportivo		
- * Club domestic league appearances and goals

Rafael Valek Moure (18 December 1932 – 17 June 2013) was a Colombian footballer who played professionally in the Colombian Professional Football League, Serie A and Mexican Primera División.

== Club career ==
Valek signed for Independiente Santa Fe as the club won the first Fútbol Profesional Colombiano title in 1948. He joined rivals Millonarios where he played mostly as a reserve from 1948 to 1952. He would win four more Colombian league titles with Millonarios.

In 1953, Valek became the first Colombian to play professional football in Europe, although he signed as a Czechoslovak player through his parents' ancestry, with Italian Serie A side Genoa. Then, he would move to Mexico where he played for Oro, Celaya and Irapuato. In 1958, he finished his playing career with Cúcuta Deportivo.

== Personal life ==
Valek was born in Bogotá on 18 December 1932. He was one of 9 children of Czech father Jan Válek and Colombian María Cristina Moure Bello. He was brother of Colombian Captain Vladimir Valek Moure, who died during the Korean War on the 22 May 1951. While Valek, as the rest of his siblings, was born in Colombia, later in his life he reclaimed his Czech nationality. He was married three times and had nine children. For unknown reasons and a supposedly jealousy incident by his wife in Mexico and some political comments he made, he was deported from Mexico and banned for life. Valek died in Pasto, Colombia on 17 June 2013.
