= Fernando Cuenca (footballer) =

Mexican footballer (1939–2015)

Personal information
- Full name: Fernando Ernesto Cuenca Friederichsen
- Date of birth: 7 April 1939
- Place of birth: Mexico City, Mexico
- Date of death: 7 April 2015 (aged 76)
- Place of death: Mexico City, Mexico
- Position: Defender

Youth career
- ???–1959: América

Senior career*
Years	Team	Apps	(Gls)
1959–1971	América		

International career
1963–1967	Mexico	3	(1)
- * Club domestic league appearances and goals

Fernando Ernesto Cuenca Friederichsen (7 April 1939 – 7 April 2015) was a Mexican footballer. Nicknamed "Perro", he only played for América as a defender throughout the 1960s and early 1970s. He also represented Mexico internationally for the 1963 and 1967 CONCACAF Championship.

== Club career ==
Cuenca began playing for América for the 1959–60 season after playing in their youth sector. Playing under club manager Fernando Marcos González. He found his first success with the club with back-to-back titles with the 1963–64 and the 1964–65 Copa México titles with those being the 3rd and 4th titles for the club in that tournament. His career highlight came during the 1965–66 Mexican Primera División where the Azulcremas would win their first national title. Cuenca would find further success by the dawn of the 1970s as the club won their second national title in the 1970–71 season under manager José Antonio Roca before his retirement that season.

== International career ==
Guerrero briefly represented his home country of Mexico for the 1963 CONCACAF Championship in two games as well as a goal scored in the 8–0 victory over Jamaica on 28 March 1963. He later returned for the 1967 CONCACAF Championship where he made a single appearance in the 0–1 defeat against Honduras on 19 March 1967.
