= Luis Comitante =

Uruguayan-Brazilian footballer and manager (born 1912)

Personal information
- Date of birth: 16 June 1912
- Place of birth: Uruguay

Managerial career
- Years: Team
- 1945–1950: Moto Club
- 1951–1952: Santos FC
- 1958–1961: ABC
- 1962–1963: El Salvador
- 1963–1965: Marathón
- 1965–1967: Broncos UNAH
- 1967: Juventud Olímpica
- 1967–1970: Deportivo Vida

Luis Comitante (born 16 June 1912, date of death unknown) was a Uruguayan-Brazilian football player and manager. Teams that he has managed include ABC in Brazil and the El Salvador national team.
