= Guarací Barbosa =

Brazilian footballer (1950–2025)

Personal information
- Full name: Guarací Barbosa da Silva
- Date of birth: 18 March 1948 (age 78)
- Place of birth: São João de Meriti, Rio de Janeiro, Brazil
- Height: 1.70 m (5 ft 7 in)
- Position: Central defender

Youth career
- 1963–1965: Olaria

Senior career*
| Years | Team | Apps | (Gls) |
| 1966–1969 | Olaria | | |
| 1969–1976 | Monterrey | 269 | (0) |
| 1976–1977 | Tigres | | |
| 1977–1979 | Veracruz | | |
| 1979–1980 | Canto do Rio | | |
- * Club domestic league appearances and goals

Guarací Barbosa da Silva (born 18 March 1948), known simply as just Guarací Barbosa is a retired Brazilian footballer. He played as a defender for various clubs in Mexico throughout the 1970s, notably playing for Monterrey throughout the first half of the decade.

== Career ==
Guarací Barbosa began his career with Olaria in at 15 years of age. Around the time of his inaugural season, Mexican club Monterrey would sign fellow Brazilian footballer Dário Alegria. Whilst his career with the club would be short-lived due to an injury in 1968 and Olaria would express interest in signing Alegria in exchange for Barbosa as the former was currently on loan with Fluminense in 1969. Monterrey representatives Adolfo Riverón and Alejandro Rodríguez later convinced Olaria to send Barbosa to Mexico for a month-long trial alongside his teammate Amilton Pereira. During his initial season with the club, he played as a relief midfielder with his debut being on 3 August that year at the Estadio Revolución Mexicana in a 4–2 loss against Pachuca with Guarací coming in as a substitute for Alberto Guerra in the 74th minute. In the following 2–0 victory against Pumas UNAM, this would be the first match in where Guarací would be a part of the Starting XI alongside goalkeeper Javier Quintero Morones. New club manager Carlos Alberto Etcheverry would later make Guarací a central defender after seeing how he was the most qualified for the position amongst the roster.

He'd define himself as an important player of the team following his individual technique and speed to counter the era of Mexican football in where central defenders weren't prominently defined yet. He was also rarely sent out of a match and would serve as a major contributor towards the club reaching three semifinals in four seasons. He was often considered to be one of the best defenders of Mexican football in the 1970s alongside Daniel Ernesto Musante and Gustavo Peña as well as being a frequent disruptor of established forwards such as Enrique Borja. By the time of his departure from the club following the 1975–76 season, he had made 269 official appearances with 247 domestic appearances, 17 the Copa MX and 4 in the CONCACAF Champions' Cup.

He spent the next season with Tigres, being one of the few players to have the distinguishment to play for both clubs. Like with Monterrey, Guarací would be an icon within the Tigres defense, named alongside other players such as Guillermo Muñoz, Alacrán Jiménez, Francisco Javier Cruz and Luis Hernández. He'd spend the next two seasons with Veracruz before returning to Rio de Janeiro. He'd spend the last seasons of his career in Niterói with Canto do Rio following the club's return to professional play with Guarací retiring in 1980 at 32 years of age.

== Later life ==
He later returned to Mexico to unite with his family there as well as because his wife sought to return to her native country. His son, David followed his father's footsteps and sign with Monterrey and despite never making his debut with the club, later played for Monterrey La Raza until the club closed in 2001. He currently works as a trainer for children between the ages of 4 to 11 at a football academy at the neighborhood of Humberto Lobo following coaching two other schools within his career in youth football.
