= Ignacio Martínez (footballer) =

Mexican footballer and manager (born 1939)

Personal information
- Full name: Ignacio Martínez Valdivia
- Date of birth: 3 December 1939 (age 86)
- Place of birth: La Piedad, Michoacán, Mexico
- Height: 1.81 m (5 ft 11 in)
- Position: Goalkeeper

Senior career*
Years	Team	Apps	(Gls)
?–1961	La Piedad		(0)
1961–1962	Ciudad Madero		(0)
1962–1964	UNAM		(0)
1964–?	Celaya		(0)
?	Atlético Morelia		(0)

Managerial career
- 1974–?: La Piedad
- * Club domestic league appearances and goals

Ignacio Martínez (born 3 December 1939) is a Mexican former footballer and manager. Martínez played as goalkeeper for La Piedad, Ciudad Madero, Club Universidad Nacional, Celaya and Atlético Morelia. As manager, Martínez spent most of his career at La Piedad. The last team he managed was Jaral del Progreso from the Tercera División in 2017.

== Career ==
Born in La Piedad, Michoacán, Martínez worked as a car mechanic before starting a career as a footballer. Originally, during his youth career with local teams from La Piedad, Martínez played as a forward, but due to his height, 1.81 meters, he switched to goalkeeper.

He was invited to join to La Piedad and made his professional debut as a replacement for the legendary goalkeeper Enrique "Tarzán" Aguilar. He later played one season (1961–62) for Ciudad Madero, where the team won the Segunda División Cup. He played with UNAM until 1964.

Martínez was part of the UNAM squad that debuted in Primera División in the 1962–63 season.

Martínez later played for Celaya and Atlético Morelia.

== Managerial career ==
In 1974, Martínez was invited by La Piedad president Francisco Mares Rodríguez to work as head coach for the team. In 1985, Martínez led La Piedad to won a Segunda División B, then the third level of Mexican professional football.

Martínez's last team as manager was Jaral del Progreso from Mexican Tercera División in 2017.
