= Eduardo Hernández (forward) =

Salvadoran footballer

Eduardo "Volkswagen" Hernández
Personal information
- Full name: Eduardo Hernández Martínez
- Place of birth: El Salvador
- Position: Forward

Senior career*
Years	Team	Apps	(Gls)
- Alianza
1962	Atlante San Alejo		
- Juventud Olímpica

International career
1961–1965	El Salvador	12	(11)
- * Club domestic league appearances and goals

Eduardo "Volkswagen" Hernández Martínez is a retired footballer from El Salvador who played as a forward.

He holds a record for being one of the top 10 goalscorers for the El Salvador national team with 11 goals. "Volkswagen" Hernández participated at the 1961 CCCF Championship, 1963 CONCACAF Championship and the 1965 CONCACAF Championship. Hernández also played at Alianza F.C. of the Salvadoran Premier League in the 1960s.

== International career ==
Nicknamed Volkswagen, Hernández played only one game at the 1961 CCCF Championship against Nicaragua where El Salvador won by a score of 10–2. He scored 2 goals at the 69th and 74th minute. At the 1963 CONCACAF Championship, hosted in El Salvador, Hernández started in all 7 games, scoring in 6. He played against Nicaragua (6–1) and scored at the 1st minute; against Panama (1–1) and scored at the 87th minute; against Honduras (2–2) and scored at the 65th minute; against Guatemala (1–1) and scored at the 24th minute; against Costa Rica (1–4) but did not score; against Honduras (3–0) and scored 2 goals at the 13th and 34th minute; against Curaçao (3–2) and scored 2 goals at the 15th and 80th minute. El Salvador were runner-up in the competition. At the 1965 CONCACAF Championship, Hernández played only one game against Curaçao (1–1) and scored one goal at the 8th minute.
