= Carlito Peters =

Brazilian footballer (1932–2003)

Carlito
Personal information
- Full name: Luis Carlos Peters
- Date of birth: 17 November 1932
- Place of birth: Penápolis, Brazil
- Date of death: 15 February 2003 (aged 70)
- Place of death: São Paulo, Brazil
- Positions: Defender; forward

Youth career
- 1944–1948: Penapolense

Senior career*
Years	Team	Apps	(Gls)
1948–1950	Penapolense		
1950–1952	Bandeirante		
1952–1953	Ferroviária		
1954–1958	Portuguesa Santista		
1958–1961	São Paulo	20	(0)
1959	→ Portuguesa Santista (loan)	14	(0)
1961	CD Oro		
1962–1964	Pumas UNAM		

Managerial career
- 1960: CD Oro (caretaker)
- 1963: Pumas UNAM (caretaker)
- 1965–1973: Penapolense (various functions)
- 1974: Pumas UNAM
- 1975: Operário-MS
- 1975–1976: Toluca
- 1977: América-SP
- 1977: Puebla
- 1979: Tigres UANL
- 1980–1981: Tampico Madero
- * Club domestic league appearances and goals

Luis Carlos Peters (17 November 1932 – 15 February 2003), better known as Carlito or Carlito Peters, was a Brazilian professional footballer and manager who played as a defender in Brazilian football, and as a forward in the last years of career, when acted in Mexican football.

== Playing career ==
Carlito began his football journey at the recently created club in his city, CA Penapolense, alongside his older brothers Dirceu and Nena. He played for the club in countryside competitions until 1950, when he transferred to Bandeirante de Birigui, his first professional club. He played for Portuguesa Santista until joining São Paulo FC in 1958, a club where he played 20 matches. Returned to Portuguesa Santista in 1959, he won the "Blue Ribbon" for the club. He was traded to CD Oro in Mexico as a defender, but there he changed his style of play and became a forward.

== Managerial career ==
Carlito began his managerial career while still active, being a caretaker at CD Oro and UNAM. Back in Brazil, he worked as a coach and in several other roles at CA Penapolense during the 1960s. In 1974 he would return to coaching UNAM, this time on a full-time basis, among other clubs in Brazil and Mexico until 1981.

== Personal life and death ==
Calirto graduated in physical education at Faculdade Marechal Rondon, in the city of Araçatuba, in 1975. He also worked as a sports commentator in Mexico on several occasions in the 70s and 80s, especially in the FIFA World Cup periods. In the late 80s he became a representant for several football players and boxers. Was also a councilor in the city of Penápolis and president of CA Penapolense from 1997 to 2002.

Carlito died on 15 February 2003, in the city of São Paulo, at the age of 70.

== Honours ==
=== Player ===
Portuguesa Santista

- Fita Azul: 1959
