= Ignacio Jáuregui =

Mexican footballer and manager (born 1938)

Personal information
- Full name: Ignacio Jáuregui Díaz
- Date of birth: 31 July 1938 (age 88)
- Place of birth: Guadalajara, Jalisco, Mexico
- Position: Defender

Senior career*
Years	Team	Apps	(Gls)
1957–1963	Atlas		
1963–1970	Monterrey		

International career
1959–1967	Mexico	32	(1)

Managerial career
- 1970–1975: Monterrey
- 1975–1976: León
- 1976–1978: Leones Negros
- 1979–1980: Tampico Madero
- 1982–1985: Coyotes Neza
- 1987–1988: Toluca
- 1988–1989: Cobras
- 1989–1991: Correcaminos
- 1992: Santos Laguna
- 1993: Pachuca
- * Club domestic league appearances and goals

Ignacio Jáuregui Díaz (born 31 July 1938) is a Mexican former professional footballer and manager.

== Life and career ==
Jauregui was born in Mexico. He played for Selección de fútbol de México (Mexico national team) in two FIFA World Cup tournaments(1962 and 1966). He also played for Club Atlas and C.F. Monterrey.

After he retired from playing, Jáuregui became a manager. He led Monterrey from 1970 to 1975.
