= Albino Morales =

Mexican footballer (1940–2020)

Personal information
- Date of birth: 30 May 1940
- Place of birth: Mexico City, Mexico
- Date of death: 11 March 2020 (aged 79)
- Place of death: Toluca, Mexico
- Position: Midfielder

Senior career*
Years	Team	Apps	(Gls)
1962–1972	Toluca		
1972–1973	Club América		
1974	Guadalajara		
1974–1975	Toluca		

International career
1963–1969	Mexico	21	(1)
- * Club domestic league appearances and goals

Albino Morales Pérez (30 May 1940 – 11 March 2020) was a Mexican professional footballer.

Born in Mexico City, Morales played club football with Toluca, América and Guadalajara. He competed at the 1968 Summer Olympics in Mexico City, where the Mexico national football team placed fourth. He also competed at the 1964 Summer Olympics in Tokyo.

On 11 March 2020, he died in Toluca.
