= Jesús del Muro =

Mexican footballer and coach (1937–2022)

Personal information
- Full name: José de Jesús del Muro López
- Date of birth: 30 November 1937
- Place of birth: Guadalajara, Jalisco, Mexico
- Date of death: 4 October 2022 (aged 84)
- Height: 1.81 m (5 ft 11 in)
- Position: Defender

Senior career*
Years	Team	Apps	(Gls)
1954–1965	CD Atlas		
1965	Veracruz		
1966	Cruz Azul		
1969	Toluca		
1971	Cruz Azul		
1973	Toluca		

International career
1958–1968	Mexico	40	(0)

Managerial career
- 1972–1973: Toluca
- 1973: Pachuca
- 1974–75: Jalisco
- 1977–78: Mexico youth team
- 1980: Mexico youth team
- 1984–86: Mexico U20
- 1987–88: Mexico U17
- 1995: Mexico U20
- 1995–97: Mexico U17
- 1997: Cruz Azul (caretaker)
- 1998–2000: Mexico U20
- * Club domestic league appearances and goals

José de Jesús del Muro López (30 November 1937 – 4 October 2022) was a Mexican football coach and player.

During his career he played as a defender for Atlas (1954–1965), Veracruz (1965), Cruz Azul (1966 and 1971) and Toluca (1969 and 1973).

In 1958 he became a member of the Mexico national team, and went on to three FIFA World Cup tournaments: 1958, 1962, and 1966, appearing in seven final tournament matches as well as two qualification matches. His 40th and last international match was in 1968.

Del Muro retired in 1973 and became a coach, managing Toluca (1972–1973), Pachuca (1973), Jalisco (1974–75) and Cruz Azul, coaching the latter for the last time in 1997. He was an assistant coach for Mexico national team at 1978 World Cup, and coach of the FIFA U-20 World Cup (FIFA World Youth Championship) (1977–78 and 1980), the Mexico U17 (1987–88 and 1995–97) and the U20 national teams (1984–86, 1995 and 1998–2000).
