= Juan José Gámez =

Costa Rican footballer and manager (1939-1997)

Personal information
- Full name: Juan José Gámez Rivera
- Date of birth: 8 July 1939
- Place of birth: Puntarenas, Costa Rica
- Date of death: 25 September 1997 (aged 58)
- Place of death: Pérez Zeledón, Costa Rica
- Position: Midfielder

Youth career
- 1958: Unión Deportiva Tibaseña

Senior career*
Years	Team	Apps	(Gls)
1959–1974	Alajuelense		

International career
1959–1970	Costa Rica	45	(7)

Managerial career
- 1974–1976: Alajuelense
- 1976: Costa Rica
- 1979–1981: Alajuelense (assistant)
- 1982–1986: Cartaginés
- 1987: Curridabat
- 1987–1989: Costa Rica U20
- 1989–1991: Alajuelense
- 1991: Generaleña
- 1992–1996: Pérez Zeledón
- 1993: Costa Rica
- 1996–1997: Cartaginés
- * Club domestic league appearances and goals

Juan José Gámez Rivera (8 July 1939 — 25 September 1997) was a Costa Rican football player and manager.

== Club career ==
Nicknamed La Hormiguita Manuda, Gámez played with the juniors of Unión Deportiva Tibaseña and spent his entire senior career playing for Alajuelense, where he won 4 league titles. He played over 200 league matches for Liga and in 121 international matches.

== International career ==
Gámez was capped by Costa Rica, playing 45 games and scoring 7 goals. He represented his country in 7 FIFA World Cup qualification matches.

== Managerial career ==
After retiring, Gámez managed Alajuelense, Cartaginés and the Costa Rica national football team all on two occasions.

== Personal life ==
A son of Juan Gámez Solano and Ernestina Rivera Montenegro, Gámez was married to Telly García Montiel and they had five children. He died in September 1997 of cardiac arrest.
