= 1962–63 Mexican Primera División season =

20th professional season of the top-flight football league in Mexico

Primera División de México
- Season: 1962–63
- Champions: Oro (1st title)
- Relegated: Tampico
- Champions' Cup: Oro; Guadalajara
- Matches: 182
- Goals: 533 (2.93 per match)

Statistics of Primera División de México in the 1962–63 season.

== Overview ==
UNAM was promoted to Primera División.

The season was contested by 14 teams, and Oro won the championship.

Tampico was relegated to Segunda División.

=== Teams ===
Location of the 1962-63 Primera División teams

Team	City	Stadium
América	Mexico City	Olímpico Universitario
Atlante	Mexico City	Olímpico Universitario
Atlas	Guadalajara, Jalisco	Jalisco
Guadalajara	Guadalajara, Jalisco	Jalisco
Irapuato	Irapuato, Guanajuato	Revolución
León	León, Guanajuato	La Martinica
Morelia	Morelia, Michoacán	Campo Independiente
Monterrey	Monterrey, Nuevo León	Tecnológico
Nacional	Guadalajara, Jalisco	Jalisco
Necaxa	Mexico City	Olímpico Universitario
Oro	Guadalajara, Jalisco	Jalisco
Tampico	Tampico, Tamaulipas	Tampico
Toluca	Toluca, State of Mexico	Luis Gutiérrez Dosal
UNAM	Mexico City	Olímpico Universitario

== League standings ==
Pos	Team	Pld	W	D	L	GF	GA	GD	Pts	Qualification or relegation
1	Oro	26	15	6	5	55	35	+20	36	Champions
2	Guadalajara	26	12	11	3	39	25	+14	35	
3	América	26	11	9	6	42	24	+18	31	
4	Atlas	26	11	9	6	38	31	+7	31	
5	Monterrey	26	8	12	6	42	38	+4	28	
6	Nacional	26	9	9	8	37	33	+4	27	
7	Toluca	26	8	10	8	32	31	+1	26	
8	Necaxa	26	9	7	10	47	51	−4	25	
9	León	26	6	13	7	35	41	−6	25	
10	Atlante	26	6	10	10	34	38	−4	22	
11	Irapuato	26	8	6	12	32	48	−16	22	
12	UNAM	26	6	9	11	32	41	−9	21	
13	Morelia	26	5	8	13	29	47	−18	18	
14	Tampico	26	5	7	14	39	50	−11	17	Relegated

1963–63 winners

1st title

== Results ==
Home \ Away	AME	ATE	ATS	GDL	IRA	LEO	MTY	MOR	NAL	NEC	ORO	TAM	TOL	UNM
América	—	1–1	0–0	0–0	1–0	0–1	4–1	5–1	2–0	4–1	1–0	1–1	1–1	2–0
Atlante	0–1	—	1–1	1–1	1–0	2–3	2–2	4–1	1–1	4–0	1–0	2–3	2–1	0–4
Atlas	2–1	3–1	—	4–2	1–2	1–1	1–1	1–1	2–1	1–1	1–2	2–2	2–1	1–0
Guadalajara	2–2	0–0	0–0	—	2–0	3–1	1–1	2–1	1–1	4–0	2–1	1–0	2–1	3–2
Irapuato	2–1	1–1	0–1	1–1	—	3–1	2–0	2–1	0–2	1–5	2–4	3–2	2–0	1–1
León	2–4	1–1	3–3	2–2	2–0	—	2–2	4–0	1–1	0–2	0–2	1–0	2–1	1–1
Monterrey	1–5	0–0	1–2	1–1	4–0	1–1	—	2–0	4–2	1–1	2–1	2–1	1–1	4–1
Morelia	1–0	0–2	2–1	0–1	2–2	1–1	2–2	—	1–2	1–1	0–3	3–1	0–0	4–1
Nacional	1–2	1–0	0–1	3–1	4–2	4–0	1–1	2–2	—	2–1	0–2	2–2	2–0	1–3
Necaxa	2–1	2–2	2–1	0–3	4–4	3–1	0–1	2–0	1–0	—	3–4	5–2	5–3	0–1
Oro	1–1	3–2	3–1	1–0	3–0	0–0	3–2	3–2	1–1	3–3	—	2–2	1–1	4–2
Tampico	2–1	4–3	0–1	0–1	0–1	2–2	1–3	2–0	2–2	4–1	2–3	—	1–2	2–2
Toluca	0–0	3–0	2–1	2–2	3–0	0–0	2–1	0–0	0–0	2–1	3–2	2–1	—	0–1
UNAM	1–1	1–0	1–3	0–1	1–1	2–2	1–1	1–3	0–1	1–1	1–3	2–0	1–1	—

Updated to match(es) played on 23 December 1962. Source: RSSSF
Legend: Blue = home team win; Yellow = draw; Red = away team win.
