= Amaury Epaminondas =

Brazilian footballer (1935-2016)

Personal information
- Full name: Amaury Epaminondas Junqueira
- Date of birth: 25 December 1935
- Place of birth: Barretos, Brazil
- Date of death: 31 March 2016 (aged 80)
- Position: Forward

Senior career*
Years	Team	Apps	(Gls)
1957–1960	São Paulo	112	(68)
1961–1965	Oro de Jalisco	26+	(68)
1965–1968	Toluca	30+	(47)
1968–1974	Atlas	?	(24+)
- * Club domestic league appearances and goals

Amaury Epaminondas Junqueira (25 December 1935 – 31 March 2016) was a Brazilian football forward who played for Brazilian club San Paolo and for several Mexicans clubs.

== Honours ==
=== Club ===
São Paulo

- Campeonato Paulista: 1957

Oro de Jalisco

- Liga MX: 1962-63

Toluca

- Liga MX: 1966-67, 1967-68
- CONCACAF Champions Cup: 1968

=== Individual ===
- Liga MX top scorer: 1962-63, 1964–65, 1966–67
