= Guillermo Ortiz (Mexican footballer) =

Mexican footballer (1939-2009)

Personal information
- Full name: Guillermo Ortiz Camargo
- Date of birth: 25 June 1939
- Place of birth: Mexico City, Mexico
- Date of death: 17 December 2009 (aged 70)
- Place of death: Mexico
- Position: Forward

Senior career*
Years	Team	Apps	(Gls)
1952–1963	Club Necaxa		

International career
1961–1963	Mexico	11	(5)
- * Club domestic league appearances and goals

Guillermo Ortiz Camargo (25 June 1939 – 17 December 2009) was a Mexican football forward who played for Mexico in the 1962 FIFA World Cup. He also played for Club Necaxa.

== Biography ==
Guillermo Ortiz started as a child on the position of the full-back, played in youth as the midfielder and later acted as a half-bladed striker. He joined his club at the age of 13, because his father, Marcial "El Ranchero" Ortiz, who also played for Necaxa, was placed in its junior department. His debut in the Mexican Primera División gave Chato Ortiz 1957 in a game against Atlas. In the 2–1 win over the Netherlands on 19 April 1961 Ortiz ran for the first time for the national team. His first goal was the "golden goal" of the 1–0 win against Colombia on April 1, 1962. Ortiz was also called in the Mexican World Cup squad in 1962, but was not used due to injuries. He scored his only "double" in the national team's match against Jamaica on 28 March 1963. He finished his last international game two days later in a goalless encounter with Costa Rica. After hitting the football boots, he discovered his love for American football and was also active in this sport. He also worked as a turner and started studying engineering sciences. In December 2009, Guillermo Ortiz died of laryngeal cancer.

== Honours ==
Club Necaxa

- Cup of Mexico winner: 1959–60
- Supercup of Mexico finalist: 1960
