= Estádio Juca Ribeiro =

Brazilian stadium

Coordinates: 18°54′44″S 48°16′20″W

- Estádio Juca Ribeiro
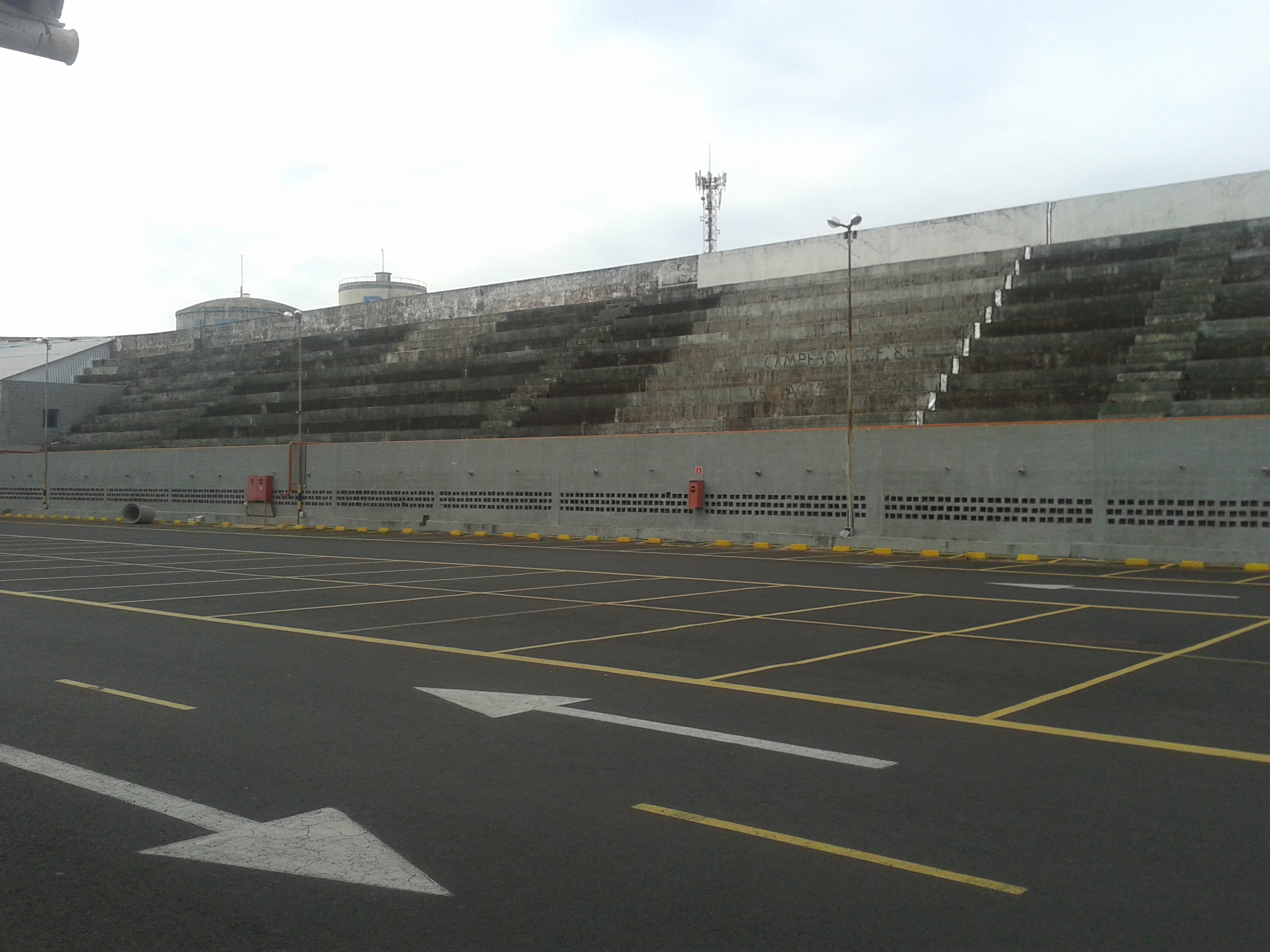
- Interactive map of Estádio Juca Ribeiro
- Full name: Estádio Juca Ribeiro
- Location: Uberlândia, Minas Gerais, Brazil
- Capacity: 20,000
- Surface: Grass

Construction
- Opened: 1933

Tenant
- Uberlândia Esporte Clube

Estádio Juca Ribeiro was a stadium in Uberlândia, Brazil. It had a capacity of 20,000 spectators. It was the home of Uberlândia Esporte Clube until the Estádio Parque do Sabiá opened in 1982.
