= C.D. Oro =

Oro
- Full name: Club Deportivo Oro
- Nickname: Mulos
- Short name: ORO, CDO
- Founded: 1 May 1923; 103 years ago
- Ground: Unidad Deportiva Revolución Mexicana; Tonalá, Jalisco
- Capacity: 3,000
- Chairman: Víctor Torres
- Manager: César Fernando Campos
- League: Liga TDP
- 2024–25: Regular phase: 12th (Group XIV); Final phase: Did not qualify
Home colours	Away colours	Third colours

Club Deportivo Oro, simplified as CD Oro, is a Mexican professional football club based in Tonalá, Jalisco. It competes in Liga TDP, the fourth level division of Mexican football, and plays its home matches at the Unidad Deportiva Revolución Mexicana. Founded in 1923, it was one of five clubs from the state of Jalisco to play in the Primera División de México.

Domestically, CD Oro has won one Primera División title and one Campeón de Campeones.

== History ==
=== Origins ===
The club's history dates back to 1923, when a group of jewelers got together and founded the club to promote their company. The club joined the old Liga Occidental De Jalisco. Albino Ruvalcaba and Felipe Martínez Sandoval were the ones that really took on the idea of making this club worthy of playing in the first division.

Back then there was no national league, but instead numerous amateur leagues across Mexico. Liga Amateur de Jalisco was one of the best at the time. It consisted of clubs such as Club Deportivo Guadalajara, Atlas de Guadalajara, Club Nacional de Guadalajara, Club Marte, Club Latino, Club Colón and Club Oriente. It took Club Oro a few years to establish a higher level of play, thus it was considered a weak team in the early 1930s. On 20 July 1930 the club inaugurated its new field Parque Oro, o Parque Oblatos in a friendly match against Mexico City club Necaxa. This new football field was used by most of the clubs at that time and was considered to be the best field in the state of Jalisco.

By 1933 there were nine clubs in the league and different categories were formed. There was an "A" and a "B" Division that were similar to a first and second division. The "A" was composed by Club Deportivo Guadalajara, Atlas de Guadalajara, Club Nacional de Guadalajara, Club Marte and Club Latino, The "B" by Club Colón, Oriente, Imperio and CD Oro due to the inferior level of these teams compared to those in the "A" Division.

=== Professional era ===
In 1943 when the professional football era began in Mexico, CD Oro missed the opportunity to join the league, however other teams in the Guadalajara metropolitan area region such as Club Deportivo Guadalajara, Atlas de Guadalajara did get an invitation that year. CD Oro saw this events as a wake-up call to get an invitation into the professionalism. CD Oro was finally invited to take part of the 1944–45 tournament along with Puebla FC and Club León, both teams had been taking part in other amateur leagues in Mexico. At the end of the 1948 tournament the club finished tied in first place along with Club León and so a series was played in order to determine the 1948 champion. The first match ended up in a 0–0 draw, the second match was won by Club León who took their first league title with a 2–0 victory.

1948 runner-up squad under player/coach "Pablotas" González: Luis Bernabé Heredia, Agapito Perales, "Negro" Barba, Manuel "Molestias" Núñez, Santiago Piola Mendoza, Florentino Palma, Antonio "Roque" Ruiz Pizano, Chepe Naranjo, Roberto "Chango" Zárate, Delfino Vázquez, and Benjamín "Bailarina" Méndez; also playing with the during the season were Benito Heredia and Jesus "Pelon" Silva.

At the end of the 1956 tournament CD Oro and Club León finished tied once again at first place and so a championship series was played. CD Oro kicked off the game by scoring a goal in the 2nd minute of play by Vigo but Leon's Marcos Aurelio tied the game. CD Oro took a 2–1 lead before half-time when Chepe Naranjo scored. The second half was dominated by Club León; they scored 3 goals and won the title once again.

CD Oro 1956 runner-up squad: Raúl Córdoba, Narciso "Chicho" López, Ramón "Cepillo" Soto, Jesús "Tejón" García, Sabino "Sabú" Morales, Evelio Alpizar, Luis "Negro" Vázquez, José "Chepe" Naranjo, Walter Meneses, José Vigo and Rafael Valek.

=== First title 1962 ===
The club won its first and only league title in the 1962–63 tournament over Club Deportivo Guadalajara and snapped a four-year streak of winning the league title. In the final game of the tournament it would be as if it was set up to be with this two clubs to meet each other. Club Deportivo Guadalajara would only have to tie in order to take that title having a one-point advantage on Oro. The final and decisive match was played on 20 December 1962 at Estadio Jalisco which was inaugurated just a few years before. The game ended-up 0–0 at half time. The second half continued tough until the minute 70 when the Brazilian player "Neco" from Club Oro scored the only goal in the match, giving CD Oro its first title. It was celebrated by the younger CD Oro team who had tied earlier that night led by Malaciaz Castilo and Mario Garcia (both were young developing players).

1962 Championship squad: Antonio "Piolín" Mota; Germán "Tamal" Ascensio, Luis Llamas, Adhemar Barsellos, Víctor Chavira, Rogelio González Navarro, Felipe "El Pipis" Ruvalcaba, Jorge "Tepo" Rodríguez, Amaury Epaminondas, Manoel Tavares "Neco", Nicola Gravina y José Luis "Zurdo" Pérez. Raul Orozco (center defense number 4)

=== Relegation 1970s ===
In 1969 the club finished last in the league tied with Jabatos de Nuevo León. A two-game series was played and after 180 minutes the score stayed at 0–0 and so a final third game was played to untie relegation. In that third games the clubs seemed tired and it was until the end of the match when Bernardino Brambila scored the only game in the match for Oro, thus Oro avoided relegation.

The following year the club once again finished last this time avoiding relegation because the Mexican Football Federation decided to increase the number of clubs in the first division from 18 to 20 and so Club Oro was spared, Puebla FC and Zacatepec were promoted from the second division.

In 1970 the club was sold due to financial problems and the new owners changed the name of the club to Club Social y Deportivo Jalisco but kept the club yellow and blue colors. The club began activities in 1970 playing its first game under the name Club Social y Deportivo Jalisco. The club finished 2nd, 5 points behind the eventual champions Deportivo Toluca F.C. In the 1971–72 tournament the club failed to qualify to the playoffs with 9 points in 8th place. In the 1972–73 the club finished last in its group. In the 1973–74 and 1975–76 seasons the club finished last in the table.

In the 1976–1977 season the club finished 12th overall 7 points behind Club de Fútbol Laguna who earned the last playoffs spot. The club won 10 games tied 14 and lost 14 out of 38, scoring 58 and allowing 59, finishing with 44 points. The Chilean Osvaldo Castro led the club with 17 goals score.

In 1977–1978 the club once again failed to qualify finishing 12th overall just 4 points behind Atlético Español who earned the last playoff spot. The club had a record of 5–29–4, scoring only 19 goals and allowing only 18.

In 1978–79 the club finished 17th overall with 39 points 6 more than the last place Toros Neza with a record of 5 wins 24 draws and 9 losses scoring 25 goals and allowing 34.

In the 1979–80 tournament the club finished tied in the last place along with Unión de Curtidores and so the clubs had to play a relegation series; Unión de Curtidores came out with a 4–3 victory keeping its place in the Mexican First Division CD Oro ended relegated and hasn't been able to come back to the Mexican First Division ever since.

=== 1980s–2011 ===
The club played in the second division during most of the 1980s coming close to promotion in 1984 when they lost the final to Zacatepec.

During 1995–1998 Arq. Rodríguez along with the support of syndicate of cañeros de Jalisco revived the club once again in the second division renaming the team to Oro Jalisco coming close to promotion after losing the final to Cachorros de la UdeG.

In 2004 the club once again was revived in the second division playing under the name Club Deportivo Oro but was later sold to Jorge Vergara who moved to club to San Rafael where they played under the name Chivas San Rafael.

In 2008 the club rejoined the second division after ex-Oros players Sergio Villalobos and Ariel Villalobos Domínguez bought the club.

There were rumors that CD Oro would join the Liga de Ascenso in 2011 or 2012.

=== 2012–2013 ===
During the Clausura 2012 of the Second Division league, the club gained much media attention after signing Mexican soccer player Ramón Morales as the team manager. Despite having great success he left the club in good terms after six months to coach the C.D. Guadalajara U-17 team. Arriving to fill the manager position during the Apertura 2013 season was former Chilean international and Club América Reinaldo Navia. While also having successful season, Navia left the manager position with 3 games left in the season due to differences with the ownership group.

==== 2012–013 roster ====
Player name	Position
Erick Alejandro Alcaraz Diaz	Goalkeeper
Efrain Israel Baeza Cruz	Goalkeeper
Erick Cirilo Bautista Aguilar	Goalkeeper
Librado Briseno Salcedo	Goalkeeper
Andres Alvarado Guillen	Defender
Ulises Rueda Reyes	Defender
Allan Enrique Valencia Avila	Defender
Roberto Carlos de Luna Ortiz	Defender
Rene Reyes Burgueno	Defender
Juan Hiram Martinez	Defender
Hector Eduardo Gomez Bustamante	Defender
Guillermo Davila Placencia	Defender
Jose Guillermo Sanchez Retenaga	Midfielder
Jose Alfredo Almaraz Dominguez	Midfielder
Eddy Hernandez	Midfielder
Gerardo Candelario Rodriguez	Midfielder
Mauricio Campos Cerda	Midfielder
Ramon Higinio Rodriguez Mora	Midfielder
Josué Daniel Quezada Bonilla	Midfielder
Luis Daniel Espindola Trujillo	Forward
Jorge Isaac Romo Romo	Forward
Eduardo Tena Marquez	Forward
Cesar Ramirez Gomez	Forward
Ricardo Jared Razo Reyes	Forward
Diego Cesar Garcia Ortega	Forward

=== 2013 – today ===
At the end of the 2012–13 season, the Second Division team disappears, maintaining the Third Division franchise, known as Mulos del Club Deportivo Oro, which continues to participate in Mexican football. This team was founded in 2008 as a reserve team of the Second Division club.

== Past kits ==
The club's colors are yellow which represents gold, white which represents silver and blue which represents the state of Jalisco. These colors have been in use since 1923 even though the clubs have had several owners and has despaired several times but has always maintained the main colors.

First kit evolution

1923 Home	1923 away	1970 Home

== Year by year statistics ==
These are the year by year statistics the club played in the first division from 1944 to 1980. In 1970 the club changed its name to Club Jalisco.

=== First division ===
Year	Pos	GP	W	T	L	GS	GA	PTS
1944–45	13	24	4	4	16	38	71	12
1945–46	3	30	17	4	9	83	61	38
1946–47	8	28	10	6	12	51	62	26
1947–48	1	28	16	4	8	80	49	36
1948–49	12	28	8	7	13	45	58	23
1949–50	11	26	8	7	11	64	72	23
1950–51	8	22	10	0	12	40	53	20
1951–52	8	22	6	7	9	30	47	19
1952–53	8	22	7	5	10	30	41	19
1953–54	2	22	12	1	9	57	45	25
1954–55	8	22	8	4	10	42	41	20
1955–56	1	26	17	3	6	49	32	37
1956–57	7	24	9	5	10	38	49	23
1957–58	9	26	8	6	12	41	53	22
1958–59	8	26	10	4	12	48	57	24
1959–60	7	26	9	7	10	44	53	25
1960–61	2	26	14	4	8	37	24	32
1961–62	4	26	13	5	8	41	32	31
1962–63	1	26	15	6	5	55	35	36
1963–64	7	26	9	7	10	53	49	25
1964–65	2	30	16	6	8	60	40	38
1965–66	14	30	6	12	12	36	50	24
1966–67	11	30	9	9	13	38	44	27
1967–68	14	30	5	11	14	35	57	21
1968–69	15	30	7	7	16	33	44	23
1969–70	11	30	7	13	41	58	54	27
Mexico 1970/1	5	14	6	2	6	15	18	14
Mexico 1970/2	8	14	2	3	9	10	21	7

== Players ==
=== Goal Scores Champions ===
- 1951–52 : (Mexico) Adalberto López (16 goals)
- 1953–54 : (Mexico) Juan Carlos Carrera (21 goals)
- 1955–56 : (Mexico) Héctor Hernández (25 goals)
- 1962–63 : (Brazil) Amaury Epaminondas (19 goals)
- 1964–65 : (Brazil) Amaury Epaminondas (21 goals)

=== All time goal scorer ===
- (Mexico) José "Chepe" Naranjo (96 goals)

== Honours ==
=== Domestic ===
Type	Competition	Titles	Winning years	Runners-up
Top division	Liga Mayor/Primera División	1	1962–63	1947–48, 1953–54, 1955–56, 1960–61, 1964–65
Top division	Copa México	0	–	1946–47
Top division	Campeón de Campeones	1	1963	–

=== Amateur ===
- Liga Occidental De Jalisco: 1939–40, 1942–43

=== Friendly ===
- Trofeo Oro-La Piedad: 1930
- Trofeo Serie Latino-Atlas-Oro: 1936
- Copa Río Blanco Cuarta Fuerza: 1936
- Trofeo Polillas: 1938
- Copa Jalisco: 1949
- Copa de Oro de Occidente: 1958

== International record ==
Season	Competition	Round	Club	Home	Away	Aggregate
1963	CONCACAF Champions' Cup	First round	(United States) New York Hungaria	2–3	2–2	4–5
